= St. Louis Stars all-time roster =

The following is the list of players on the St. Louis Stars all-time roster. These are St. Louis Stars players who appeared in at least one game for the Stars or, as they were previously named, the Giants, from 1906 to 1931.

On-going research continuously discovers unreported or misreported games (and the affected players), while some games and players may be lost forever. Therefore, some Negro league players' affiliations will likely remain incomplete and possibly disputed.

‡ Bold player inducted as a member of the National Baseball Hall of Fame and Museum.

== A–D ==
| Player | Year(s) | Position(s) | Ref |
|---|---|---|---|
| Newt Allen | 1931 | 2B | |
| John Barnes | 1925–1926 | C | |
| Harry Bauchman | 1920 | 2B | |
| Cool Papa Bell‡ | 1922–1931 | OF | |
| Fred Bell | 1923–1925 | P | |
| Sam Bennett | 1911–1913, 1915–1917, 1919–1923, 1925 | OF | |
| Charlie Blackwell | 1916–1917, 1919–1925 | OF | |
| Willie Bobo | 1924–1928 | 1B | |
| Robert Bonner | 1923 | 1B | |
| Slim Branham | 1925 | P | |
| Sidney Brooks | 1919–1923 | OF / IF | |
| George W. Brown | 1917 | 2B | |
| George Brown | 1925–1927 | P | |
| Richard Cannon | 1928–1929 | P | |
| Wayne Carr | 1920–1922 | P | |
| Kid Cary | 1915–1917, 1919 | 3B | |
| Joe Casey | 1920 | P | |
| Oscar Charleston‡ | 1920–1922 | OF | |
| Dell Clark | 1921 | 2B | |
| Ralph Cleage | 1924 | OF | |
| Lorenza Cobb | 1915–1917, 1919–1920 | C | |
| Dewey Creacy | 1924–1931 | 3B | |
| John Cunningham | 1917 | SS | |
| Lunie Danage | 1920 | 2B | |
| Fred Daniels | 1919 | P | |
| Rosey Davis | 1924–1931 | P | |
| Connie Day | 1920 | 2B | |
| Steel Arm Dickey | 1922 | P | |
| Johnnie Bob Dixon | 1926 | P | |
| Bill Drake | 1916, 1918–1922, 1930 | P | |
| Ralph Ducy | 1924 | 3B | |
| Doc Dudley | 1920–1923 | OF | |

== E–L ==
| Player | Year(s) | Position(s) | Ref |
|---|---|---|---|
| Bob Fagan | 1923 | 2B | |
| Luther Farrell | 1920 | P | |
| James Field | 1921 | P | |
| John Finner | 1919–1924 | P | |
| Bill Gatewood | 1915–1917, 1919–1920, 1922 | P | |
| George Giles | 1930–1931 | 1B | |
| Arthur Gilliard | 1911 | P | |
| Herman Gordon | 1923 | P | |
| Earl Gurley | 1922–1923 | P | |
| Perry Hall | 1921–1922 | P / 2B | |
| Ted Hamilton | 1924 | P | |
| Charlie Hancock | 1921 | C | |
| Bill Handy | 1915–1916 | 2B | |
| Henry Hannon | 1911, 1913 | C / OF | |
| Earl Harrison | 1927 | P | |
| Lefty Harvey | 1912 | P | |
| Buddy Hayes | 1916 | C | |
| Rats Henderson | 1931 | P | |
| Logan Hensley | 1922–1931 | P | |
| Mose Herring | 1920 | 3B | |
| Joe Hewitt | 1911–1913, 1915–1916, 1920–1923 | SS / OF | |
| Lee Hill | 1920 | 2B | |
| Eddie Holtz | 1919–1924 | 2B / SS | |
| Bertrum Hunter | 1931 | P | |
| Oscar Hutt | 1920 | OF | |
| Tom Jackson | 1926–1927 | P | |
| Heavy Johnson | 1920 | C | |
| Arthur Jones | 1926 | 2B | |
| Will Jones | 1919 | 3B | |
| Dan Kennard | 1916, 1919–1923 | C | |
| Ted Kimbro | 1915–1916 | 3B | |
| Ad Lankford | 1912 | P | |
| Jimmie Lyons | 1911–1912, 1915–1917, 1919–1920 | OF | |

== M–R ==
| Player | Year(s) | Position(s) | Ref |
|---|---|---|---|
| Biz Mackey‡ | 1920 | C | |
| Leroy Matlock | 1929–1931 | P | |
| Tullie McAdoo | 1911–1913, 1915–1917, 1919–1923 | 1B | |
| Luther McDonald | 1927–1929 | P | |
| Deacon Meyers | 1921–1925 | P | |
| Hub Miller | 1915–1916 | P | |
| Percy Miller | 1922–1923, 1925–1926 | P / OF | |
| George Mitchell | 1924 | OF / P | |
| Robert Mitchell | 1924 | C | |
| Sam Mongin | 1911–1913, 1921 | 3B | |
| Eugene Moore | 1911, 1913, 1920 | OF | |
| Mitchell Murray | 1923–1928 | C | |
| Jimmy Oldham | 1920–1923 | P | |
| Clarence Palm | 1928–1929 | C | |
| Salvador Poree | 1921 | P | |
| Robert Prior | 1916–1917 | P | |
| Wesley Pryor | 1912 | 3B | |
| Ted Radcliffe | 1930 | C / P | |
| Otto Ray | 1922–1923 | C | |
| Wilson Redus | 1924–1931 | OF | |
| Andrew Reed | 1919 | 3B | |
| John Reese | 1923–1926, 1928, 1930–1931 | OF | |
| Lefty Robinson | 1924 | P | |
| Carl Rolling | 1920 | OF | |
| Dick Ross | 1925–1926 | OF | |
| William Ross | 1924–1926 | P | |
| Branch Russell | 1922–1931 | OF | |
| John Henry Russell | 1926–1930 | 2B | |

== S–Z ==
| Player | Year(s) | Position(s) | Ref |
|---|---|---|---|
| Bob Scott | 1919–1920 | OF | |
| Herbert Smith | 1921 | P | |
| Joe Smith | 1913, 1915 | P | |
| Milton Smith | 1925, 1927 | C | |
| Otis Starks | 1921 | P | |
| Frank Stevens | 1927 | P | |
| Archie Stewart | 1923 | P | |
| Joe Strong | 1930–1931 | P | |
| Mule Suttles‡ | 1926–1931 | 1B / OF | |
| Ben Taylor‡ | 1911 | P / 1B | |
| Candy Jim Taylor | 1911, 1923–1925, 1927–1929 | 3B | |
| Steel Arm Johnny Taylor | 1911 | P | |
| Ewell Thomas | 1923–1924 | 2B / SS | |
| Jules Thomas | 1912 | OF | |
| Lonnie Torian | 1920 | P | |
| Ted Trent | 1927–1931 | P | |
| Quincy Trouppe | 1930–1931 | C | |
| Roy Tyler | 1925 | OF | |
| Johnnie Vivens | 1929 | P | |
| Lee Wade | 1912, 1916 | P | |
| Dick Wallace | 1911–1913, 1915–1916, 1919–1921 | SS / 3B / 2B | |
| Frank Warfield | 1916, 1922 | SS / OF | |
| H. P. Warmack | 1911 | 1B | |
| Charlie Watts | 1924–1926 | 2B | |
| Pearl Webster | 1912, 1915 | C | |
| William Webster | 1915–1916 | C | |
| Willie Wells‡ | 1924–1931 | SS | |
| Charles Wesley | 1922 | OF | |
| James White | 1922 | 2B | |
| Henry Williams | 1926–1930 | C | |
| John Williams | 1927–1930 | P / OF | |
| String Bean Williams | 1915–1916 | P | |
| Elmer Wilson | 1925 | 2B | |
| Noble Wilson | 1919 | OF | |
| George Womack | 1924 | C | |
| John Young | 1923–1924 | P | |
| Tom Young | 1931 | C | |
| Charles Zomphier | 1927, 1931 | 2B / OF | |
