= List of Major League Baseball annual runs batted in leaders =

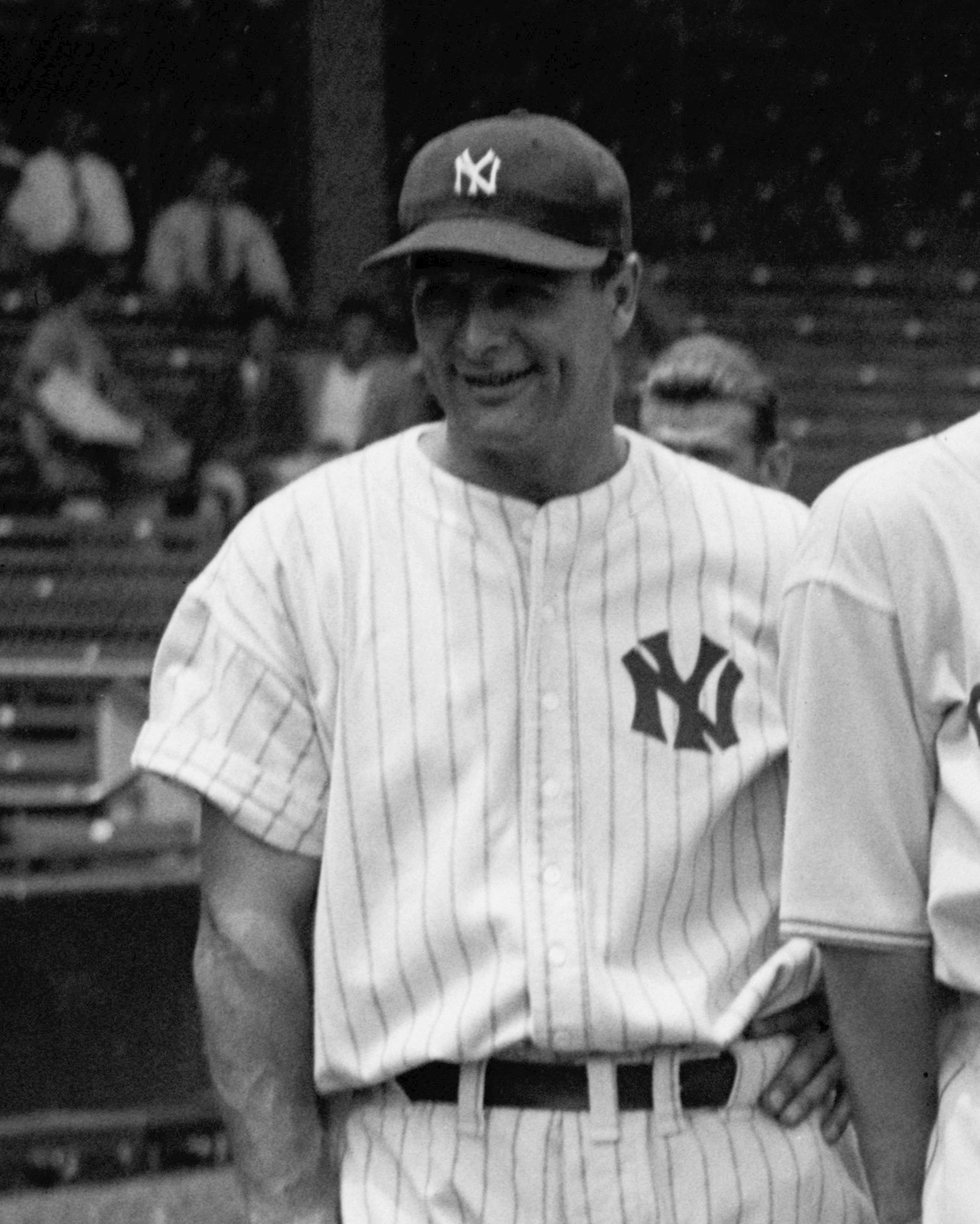
Lou Gehrig briefly held the single-season RBI record with his 175 in 1927 before Hack Wilson topped this total with 191 in 1930. In total Gehrig was responsible for three of the seven seasons in which a player hit 170 or more RBI.

In baseball, a run batted in (RBI) is awarded to a batter for each runner who scores as a direct result of the batter's action, including a hit, fielder's choice, sacrifice fly, or a walk or hit by pitch with the bases loaded. A batter is also awarded an RBI for scoring himself upon hitting a home run. However, if a run scores because of an error that the defense commits on a batted ball, the batter does not (in most cases) receive an RBI; the exception is when the official scorer deems the run would've scored with or without an error, such as when an error occurs on a fielder's choice.

In Major League Baseball (MLB), a player in each league (Note: Recognized "major leagues" include the current American and National Leagues and several defunct leagues – the American Association, the Federal League, the Players' League, and the Union Association (however, RBI statistics are not available for the Union Association). Seven negro league baseball leagues are also recognized as major leagues between 1920 and 1948: Negro National League I (1920–1931); Eastern Colored League (1923–1928); American Negro League (1929); East–West League (1932); Negro Southern League (1932); Negro National League II (1933–1948); and Negro American League (1937–1948).) wins the "RBI crown" or "RBI title" each season by hitting the most runs batted in that year. The first RBI champion in the National League (NL) was Deacon White; in the league's inaugural 1876 season, White hit 60 RBIs for the Chicago White Stockings. The American League (AL) was established in 1901, and Hall of Fame second baseman Nap Lajoie led that league with 125 RBIs for the Philadelphia Athletics. Over the course of his 27-season career, Cap Anson led the NL in RBI eight times. Babe Ruth and Honus Wagner have the second- and third-most RBI titles, respectively: Ruth with six, and Wagner with five. Several players are tied for the most consecutive seasons led with three: Anson (twice), Ty Cobb, Rogers Hornsby, Ruth, Joe Medwick, George Foster, and Cecil Fielder. Notably, Matt Holliday won the NL title in 2007 by one RBI over Ryan Howard, only overtaking Howard due to his performance in the 2007 National League Wild Card tie-breaker game. Had Howard won the 2007 title, he would have led the NL in a record four consecutive seasons from 2006 to 2009. The most recent champions are Pete Alonso in the American League, and Alec Burleson in the National League. Alonso became the first player to win the RBI title in both the American and National League.

Sam Thompson was the first to set a single-season RBI record that stood for more than three seasons, hitting 166 in 1887. Thompson's title that season also represented the widest margin of victory for an RBI champion as he topped the next highest total by 62 RBIs. The single-season mark of 166 stood for over thirty years until Babe Ruth hit 171 in 1921. Ruth's mark was then broken by teammate Lou Gehrig six seasons later in 1927 when Gehrig hit 175 RBI. Finally, Hack Wilson set the current record mark of 191 RBI in 1930 with the Chicago Cubs. The all-time career RBI record holder is Hank Aaron with 2,297, 84 more than Ruth in second place. Aaron led the National League in RBI four times, never consecutively. The 1930 season when Wilson set the record saw four players hit more than 160 RBI: Wilson, Gehrig, Chuck Klein, and Al Simmons. A player has batted in 160 or more runs 21 times, with 14 of these seasons occurring during the 1930s and only twice since 1940. The lowest RBI total to ever lead a major league was 49, by Deacon White in the National League's second season.

The league lead in RBI was shared by two players of the same team twice in history, both times by players for the Boston Red Sox: in 1949 shortstop Vern Stephens and left fielder Ted Williams each had 159 RBI, then again in 1950, Stephens and first baseman Walt Dropo each had 144. As of 2026, 1950 was also the last year a shortstop won the title.

== Key ==
Winner(s)	Player(s) with the most runs batted in (RBI) in the league
RBI	The winner's total number of runs batted in
Runner(s)-up	Player(s) with the second-most RBIs in the league
2nd RBI	The runner-up total number of runs batted in
League	Denoted only for players outside of the modern major leagues
†	Member of the National Baseball Hall of Fame and Museum

== American League ==
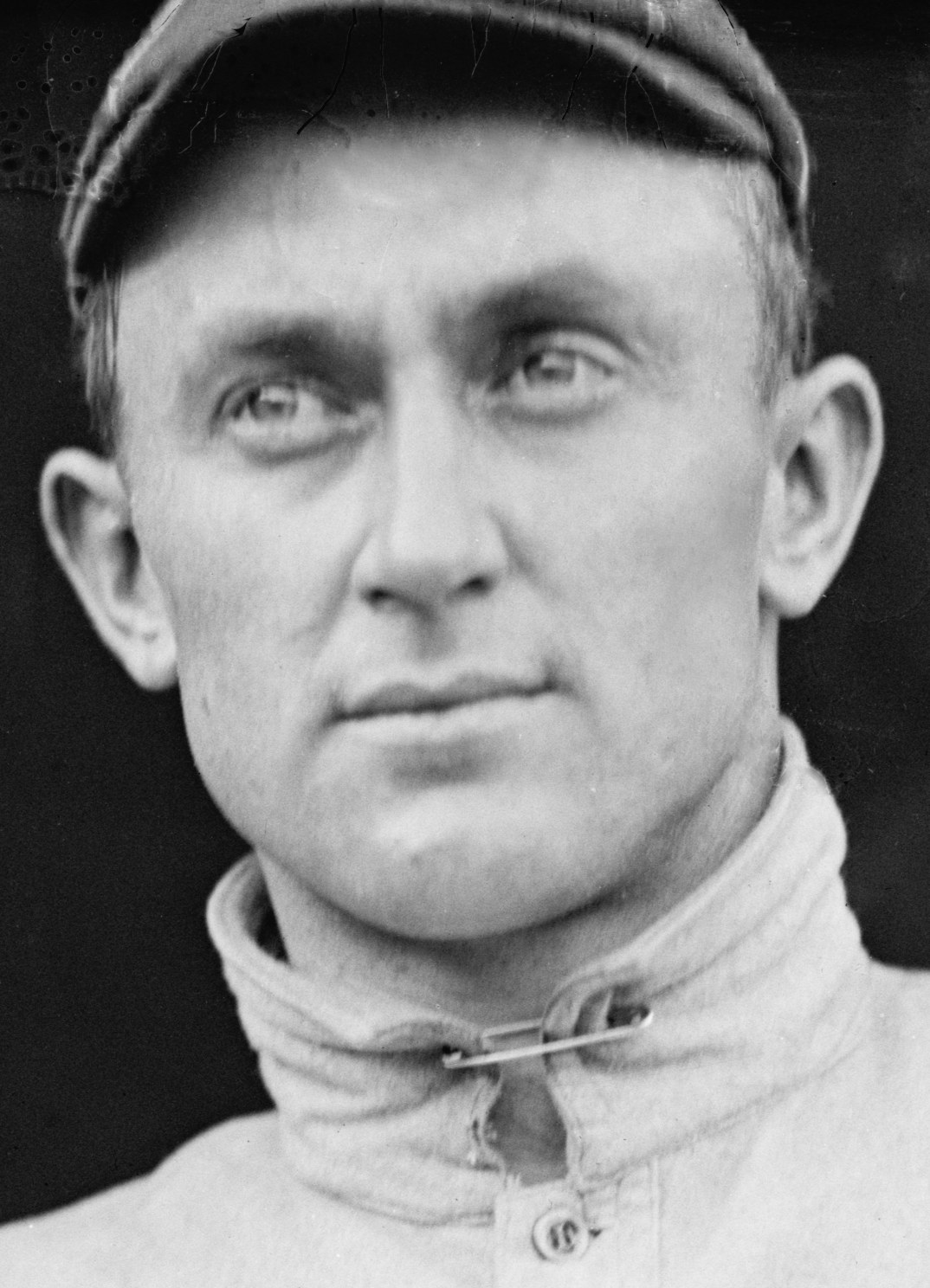
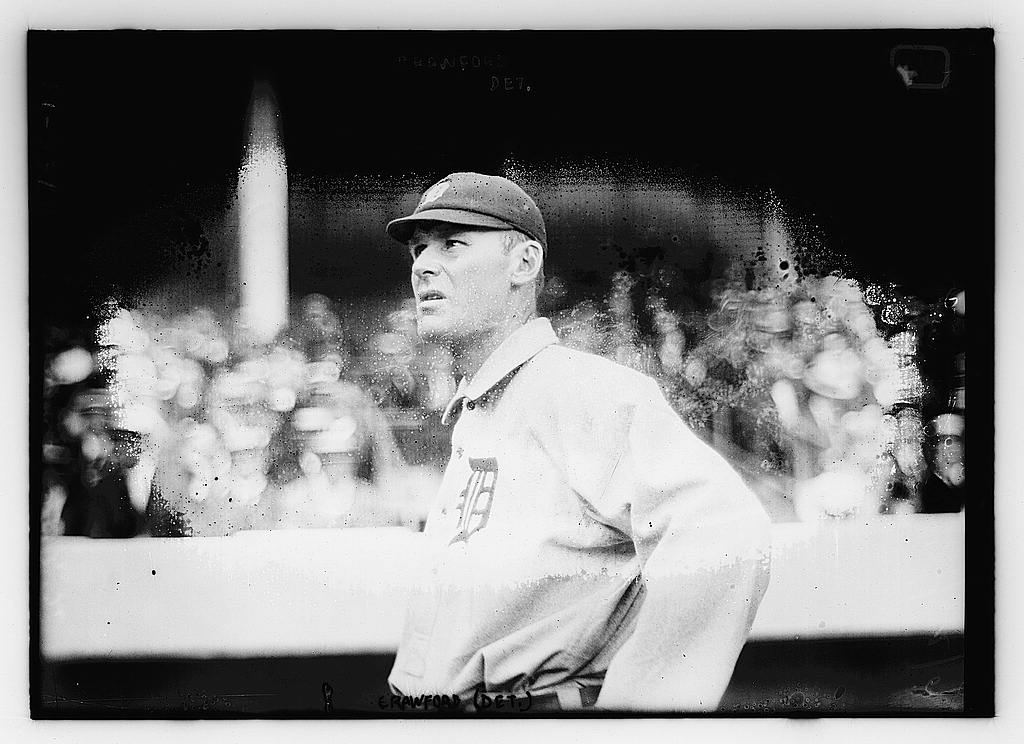
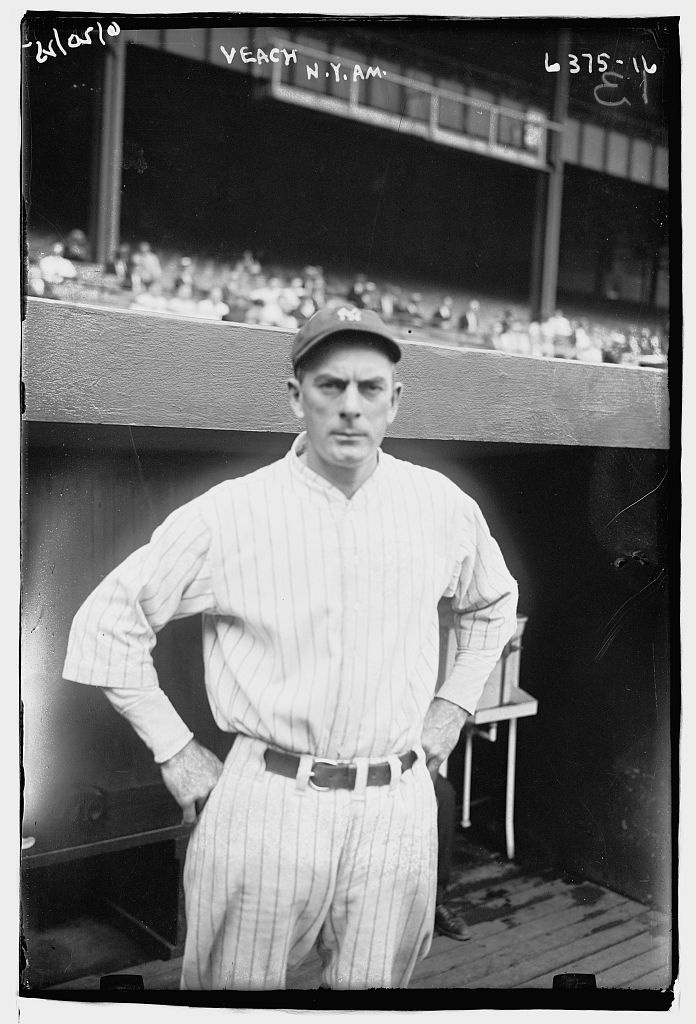
Detroit Tigers teammates Ty Cobb, Sam Crawford, and Bobby Veach won nine of the twelve American League RBI titles from 1907 to 1918.

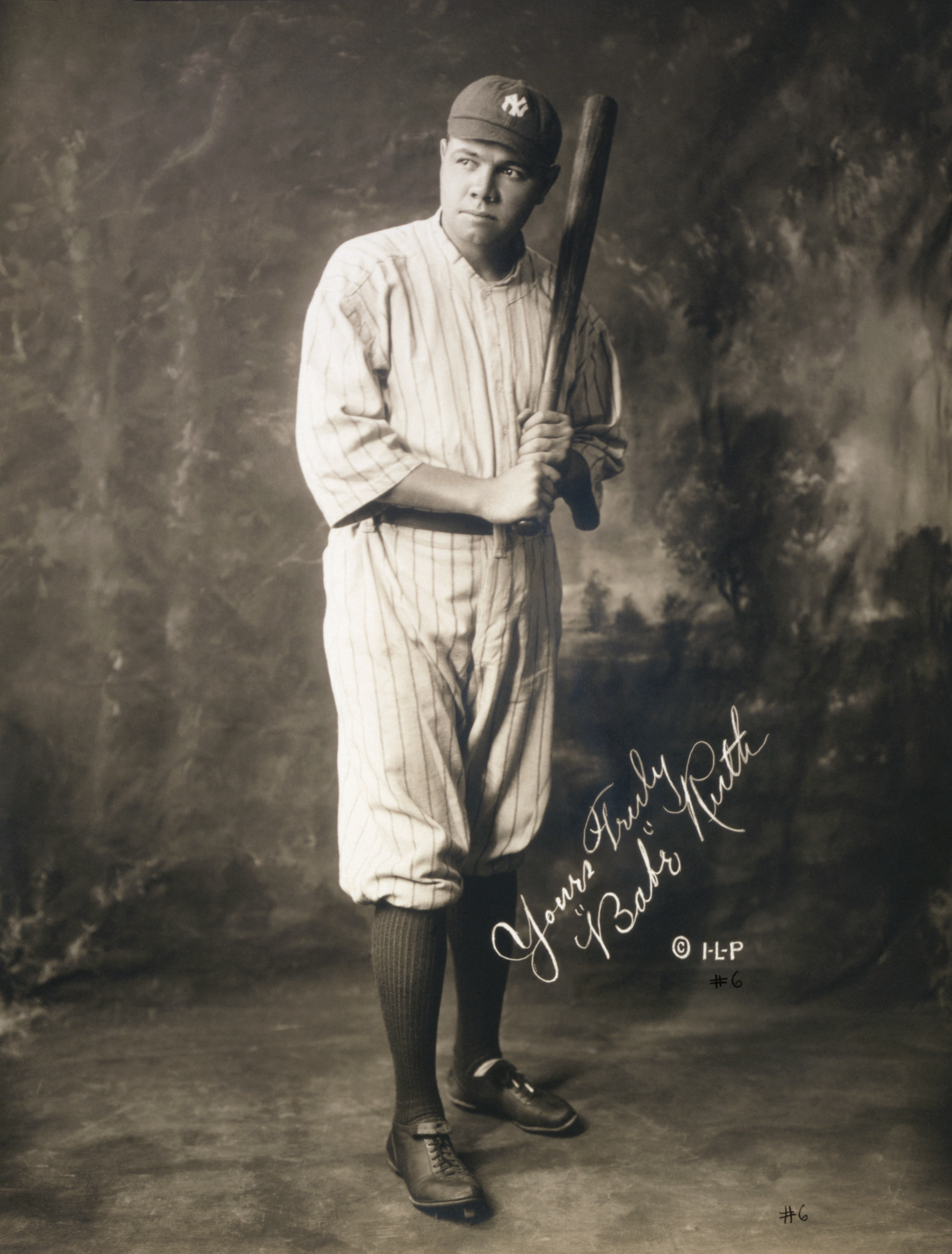
Babe Ruth held the single-season RBI record from 1921 to 1927, holds the second-most RBI titles with five, and has the second-most career RBI.

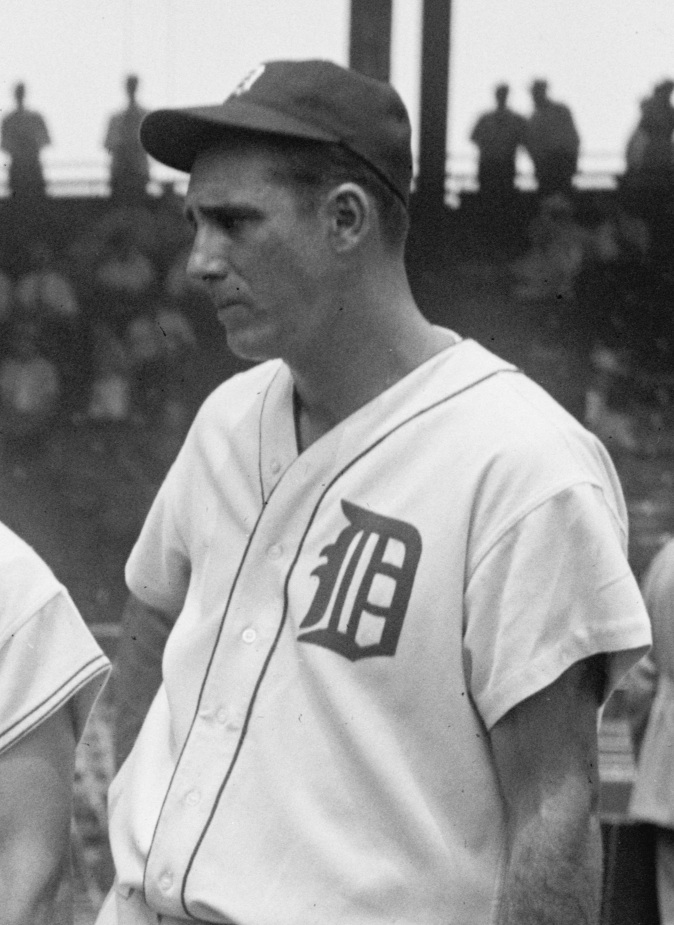
Hank Greenberg, Hall of Famer and 4-time RBI leader

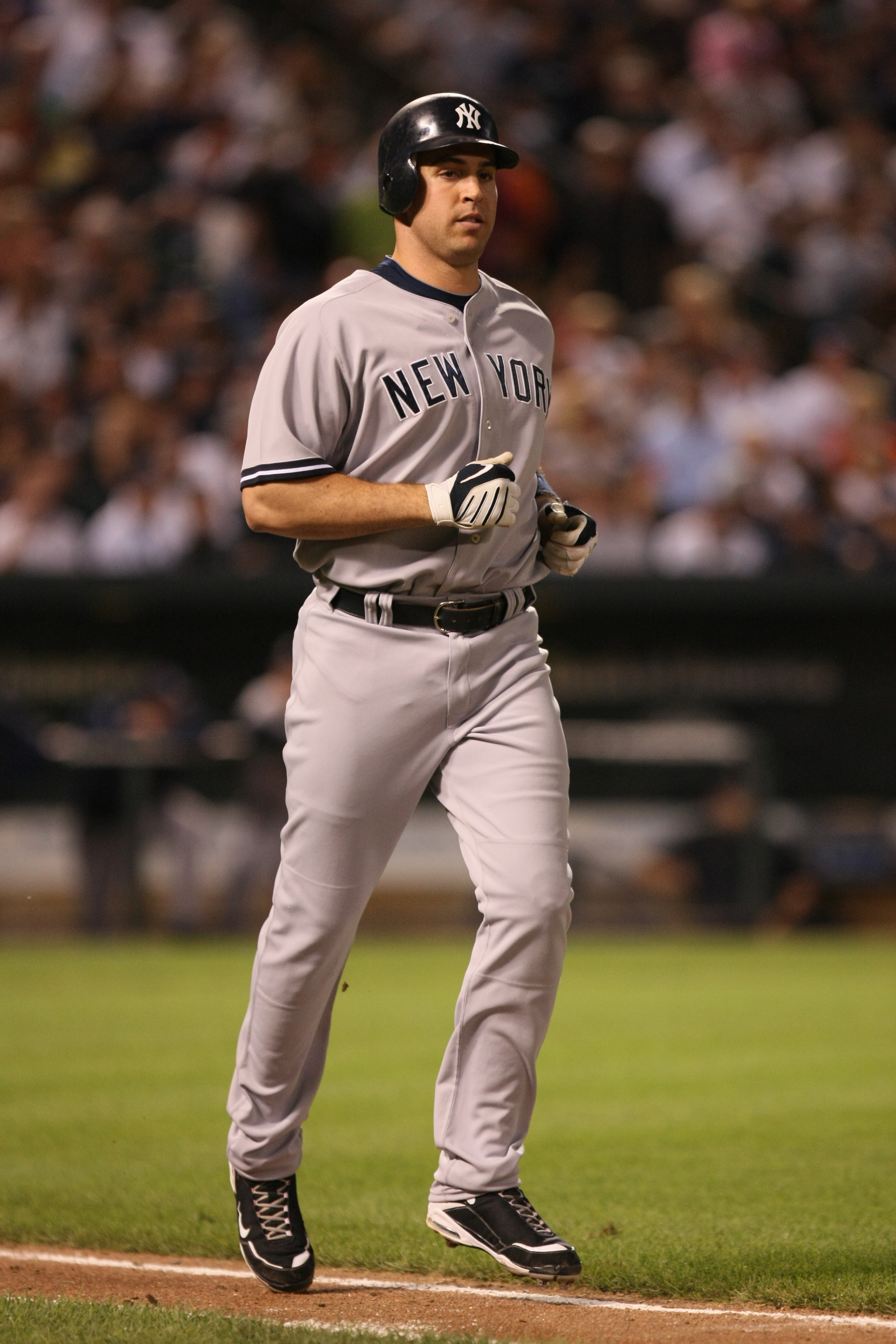
Mark Teixeira led the American League in RBI in 2009.

Year	Winner(s)	RBI	Team(s)	Runner(s)-up	2nd RBI	Ref
1901	Nap Lajoie^{†}	125	Philadelphia Athletics	Buck Freeman	114	
1902	Buck Freeman	121	Boston Americans	Charlie Hickman	110	
1903	Buck Freeman	104	Boston Americans	Charlie Hickman	97	
1904	Nap Lajoie^{†}	102	Cleveland Naps	Buck Freeman	84	
1905	Harry Davis	83	Philadelphia Athletics	Lave Cross	77	
1906	Harry Davis	96	Philadelphia Athletics	Nap Lajoie^{†}	91	
1907	Ty Cobb^{†}	119	Detroit Tigers	Socks Seybold	92	
1908	Ty Cobb^{†}	108	Detroit Tigers	Sam Crawford^{†}	80	
1909	Ty Cobb^{†}	107	Detroit Tigers	Sam Crawford^{†}	97	
1910	Sam Crawford^{†}	120	Detroit Tigers	Ty Cobb^{†}	91	
1911	Ty Cobb^{†}	127	Detroit Tigers	Sam Crawford^{†}	115	
1912	Frank Baker^{†}	130	Philadelphia Athletics	Duffy Lewis	109	
1913	Frank Baker^{†}	117	Philadelphia Athletics	Stuffy McInnis	90	
1914	Sam Crawford^{†}	104	Detroit Tigers	Stuffy McInnis	95	
1915	Bobby Veach; Sam Crawford^{†}	112	Detroit Tigers	Ty Cobb^{†}	99	
1916	Del Pratt	103	St. Louis Browns	Wally Pipp	93	
1917	Bobby Veach	103	Detroit Tigers	Happy Felsch	102	
1918	Bobby Veach	78	Detroit Tigers	George Burns	70	
1919	Babe Ruth^{†}	113	Boston Red Sox	Bobby Veach	101	
1920	Babe Ruth^{†}	135	New York Yankees	George Sisler^{†}	122	
1921	Babe Ruth^{†}	168	New York Yankees	Harry Heilmann^{†}	139	
1922	Ken Williams	155	St. Louis Browns	Bobby Veach	126	
1923	Babe Ruth^{†}	130	New York Yankees	Tris Speaker^{†}	130	
1924	Goose Goslin^{†}	129	Washington Senators	Babe Ruth^{†}	124	
1925	Bob Meusel	138	New York Yankees	Harry Heilmann^{†}	134	
1926	Babe Ruth^{†}	153	New York Yankees	Tony Lazzeri^{†}	117	
1927	Lou Gehrig^{†}	173	New York Yankees	Babe Ruth^{†}	165	
1928	Lou Gehrig^{†} Babe Ruth^{†}	142	St. Louis Cardinals	Jim Bottomley	136	
1929	Al Simmons^{†}	157	Philadelphia Athletics	Babe Ruth^{†}	154	
1930	Lou Gehrig^{†}	173	New York Yankees	Al Simmons^{†}	165	
1931	Lou Gehrig^{†}	185	New York Yankees	Babe Ruth^{†}	162	
1932	Jimmie Foxx^{†}	169	Philadelphia Athletics	Lou Gehrig^{†} Al Simmons^{†}	151	
1933	Jimmie Foxx^{†}	163	Philadelphia Athletics	Lou Gehrig^{†}	139	
1934	Lou Gehrig^{†}	165	New York Yankees	Hal Trosky	142	
1935	Hank Greenberg^{†}	168	Detroit Tigers	Lou Gehrig^{†}	119	
1936	Hal Trosky	162	Cleveland Indians	Lou Gehrig^{†}	152	
1937	Hank Greenberg^{†}	184	Detroit Tigers	Joe DiMaggio^{†}	167	
1938	Jimmie Foxx^{†}	175	Boston Red Sox	Hank Greenberg^{†}	146	
1939	Ted Williams^{†}	145	Boston Red Sox	Joe DiMaggio^{†}	126	
1940	Hank Greenberg^{†}	150	Detroit Tigers	Rudy York	134	
1941	Joe DiMaggio^{†}	125	New York Yankees	Jeff Heath	123	
1942	Ted Williams^{†}	137	Boston Red Sox	Joe DiMaggio^{†}	114	
1943	Rudy York	118	Detroit Tigers	Nick Etten	107	
1944	Vern Stephens	109	St. Louis Browns	Bob Johnson	106	
1945	Nick Etten	111	New York Yankees	Roy Cullenbine	93	
1946	Hank Greenberg^{†}	127	Detroit Tigers	Ted Williams^{†}	123	
1947	Ted Williams^{†}	114	Boston Red Sox	Tommy Henrich	98	
1948	Joe DiMaggio^{†}	155	New York Yankees	Vern Stephens	137	
1949	Ted Williams^{†} Vern Stephens	159	Boston Red Sox	Vic Wertz	133	
1950	Walt Dropo; Vern Stephens	144	Boston Red Sox	Yogi Berra^{†}	124	
1951	Gus Zernial	129	Chicago White Sox; Philadelphia Athletics	Ted Williams^{†}	126	
1952	Al Rosen	105	Cleveland Indians	Larry Doby^{†} Eddie Robinson	104	
1953	Al Rosen	145	Cleveland Indians	Mickey Vernon	115	
1954	Larry Doby^{†}	126	Cleveland Indians	Yogi Berra^{†}	125	
1955	Ray Boone; Jackie Jensen	116	Detroit Tigers; Boston Red Sox	Yogi Berra^{†}	108	
1956	Mickey Mantle^{†}	130	New York Yankees	Al Kaline^{†}	128	
1957	Roy Sievers	114	Washington Senators	Vic Wertz	105	
1958	Jackie Jensen	122	Boston Red Sox	Rocky Colavito	113	
1959	Jackie Jensen	112	Boston Red Sox	Rocky Colavito	111	
1960	Roger Maris	112	New York Yankees	Minnie Miñoso^{†}	105	
1961	Jim Gentile; Roger Maris	141	Baltimore Orioles; New York Yankees	Rocky Colavito	140	
1962	Harmon Killebrew^{†}	126	Minnesota Twins	Norm Siebern	117	
1963	Dick Stuart	118	Boston Red Sox	Al Kaline^{†}	101	
1964	Brooks Robinson^{†}	118	Baltimore Orioles	Dick Stuart	114	
1965	Rocky Colavito	108	Cleveland Indians	Willie Horton	104	
1966	Frank Robinson^{†}	122	Baltimore Orioles	Harmon Killebrew^{†}	110	
1967	Carl Yastrzemski^{†}	121	Boston Red Sox	Harmon Killebrew^{†}	113	
1968	Ken Harrelson	109	Boston Red Sox	Frank Howard	106	
1969	Harmon Killebrew^{†}	140	Minnesota Twins	Boog Powell	121	
1970	Frank Howard	126	Washington Senators	Tony Conigliaro	116	
1971	Harmon Killebrew^{†}	119	Minnesota Twins	Frank Robinson^{†}	99	
1972	Dick Allen^{†}	113	Chicago White Sox	John Mayberry	100	
1973	Reggie Jackson^{†}	117	Oakland Athletics	George Scott	107	
1974	Jeff Burroughs	118	Texas Rangers	Sal Bando	103	
1975	George Scott	109	Milwaukee Brewers	John Mayberry	106	
1976	Lee May	109	Baltimore Orioles	Thurman Munson	105	
1977	Larry Hisle	119	Minnesota Twins	Bobby Bonds	115	
1978	Jim Rice^{†}	139	Boston Red Sox	Rusty Staub	121	
1979	Don Baylor	139	California Angels	Jim Rice^{†}	130	
1980	Cecil Cooper	122	Milwaukee Brewers	George Brett^{†} Ben Oglivie	118	
1981	Eddie Murray^{†}	78	Baltimore Orioles	Tony Armas	76	
1982	Hal McRae	133	Kansas City Royals	Cecil Cooper	121	
1983	Jim Rice^{†} Cecil Cooper	126	Boston Red Sox; Milwaukee Brewers	Dave Winfield^{†}	116	
1984	Tony Armas	123	Boston Red Sox	Jim Rice^{†}	122	
1985	Don Mattingly	145	New York Yankees	Eddie Murray^{†}	124	
1986	Joe Carter	121	Cleveland Indians	José Canseco	117	
1987	George Bell	134	Toronto Blue Jays	Dwight Evans	123	
1988	José Canseco	124	Oakland Athletics	Kirby Puckett^{†}	121	
1989	Rubén Sierra	119	Texas Rangers	Don Mattingly	113	
1990	Cecil Fielder	132	Detroit Tigers	Kelly Gruber	118	
1991	Cecil Fielder	133	Detroit Tigers	José Canseco	122	
1992	Cecil Fielder	124	Detroit Tigers	Joe Carter	119	
1993	Albert Belle	129	Cleveland Indians	Frank Thomas^{†}	128	
1994	Kirby Puckett^{†}	112	Minnesota Twins	Joe Carter	103	
1995	Albert Belle; Mo Vaughn	126	Cleveland Indians; Boston Red Sox	Jay Buhner	121	
1996	Albert Belle	148	Cleveland Indians	Juan González	144	
1997	Ken Griffey Jr.^{†}	147	Seattle Mariners	Tino Martinez	141	
1998	Juan González	157	Texas Rangers	Albert Belle	152	
1999	Manny Ramirez	165	Cleveland Indians	Rafael Palmeiro	148	
2000	Edgar Martínez^{†}	145	Seattle Mariners	Mike Sweeney	144	
2001	Bret Boone	141	Seattle Mariners	Juan González	140	
2002	Alex Rodriguez	142	Texas Rangers	Magglio Ordóñez	135	
2003	Carlos Delgado	145	Toronto Blue Jays	Alex Rodriguez	118	
2004	Miguel Tejada	150	Baltimore Orioles	David Ortiz^{†}	139	
2005	David Ortiz^{†}	148	Boston Red Sox	Manny Ramirez; Mark Teixeira	144	
2006	David Ortiz^{†}	137	Boston Red Sox	Justin Morneau	130	
2007	Alex Rodriguez	156	New York Yankees	Magglio Ordóñez	139	
2008	Josh Hamilton	130	Texas Rangers	Justin Morneau	129	
2009	Mark Teixeira	122	New York Yankees	Jason Bay	119	
2010	Miguel Cabrera	126	Detroit Tigers	Alex Rodriguez	125	
2011	Curtis Granderson	119	New York Yankees	Robinson Canó	118	
2012	Miguel Cabrera	139	Detroit Tigers	Josh Hamilton	128	
2013	Chris Davis	138	Baltimore Orioles	Miguel Cabrera	137	
2014	Mike Trout	111	Los Angeles Angels of Anaheim	Miguel Cabrera	109	
2015	Josh Donaldson	123	Toronto Blue Jays	Chris Davis	117	
2016	Edwin Encarnación; David Ortiz^{†}	127	Toronto Blue Jays; Boston Red Sox	Albert Pujols	119	
2017	Nelson Cruz	119	Seattle Mariners	Aaron Judge	114	
2018	J. D. Martinez	130	Boston Red Sox	Khris Davis	123	
2019	José Abreu	123	Chicago White Sox	Xander Bogaerts; Jorge Soler	117	
2020	José Abreu	60	Chicago White Sox	Luke Voit	52	
2021	Salvador Perez	121	Kansas City Royals	José Abreu	117	
2022	Aaron Judge	131	New York Yankees	José Ramírez	126	
2023	Kyle Tucker	112	Houston Astros	Adolis García	107	
2024	Aaron Judge	144	New York Yankees	José Ramírez	118	
2025	Cal Raleigh	125	Seattle Mariners	Aaron Judge	114	
2026	Pete Alonso	113	Baltimore Orioles	Yordan Álvarez	106	

== National League ==
Cap Anson led the National League in a record eight seasons including two streaks of three consecutive titles.

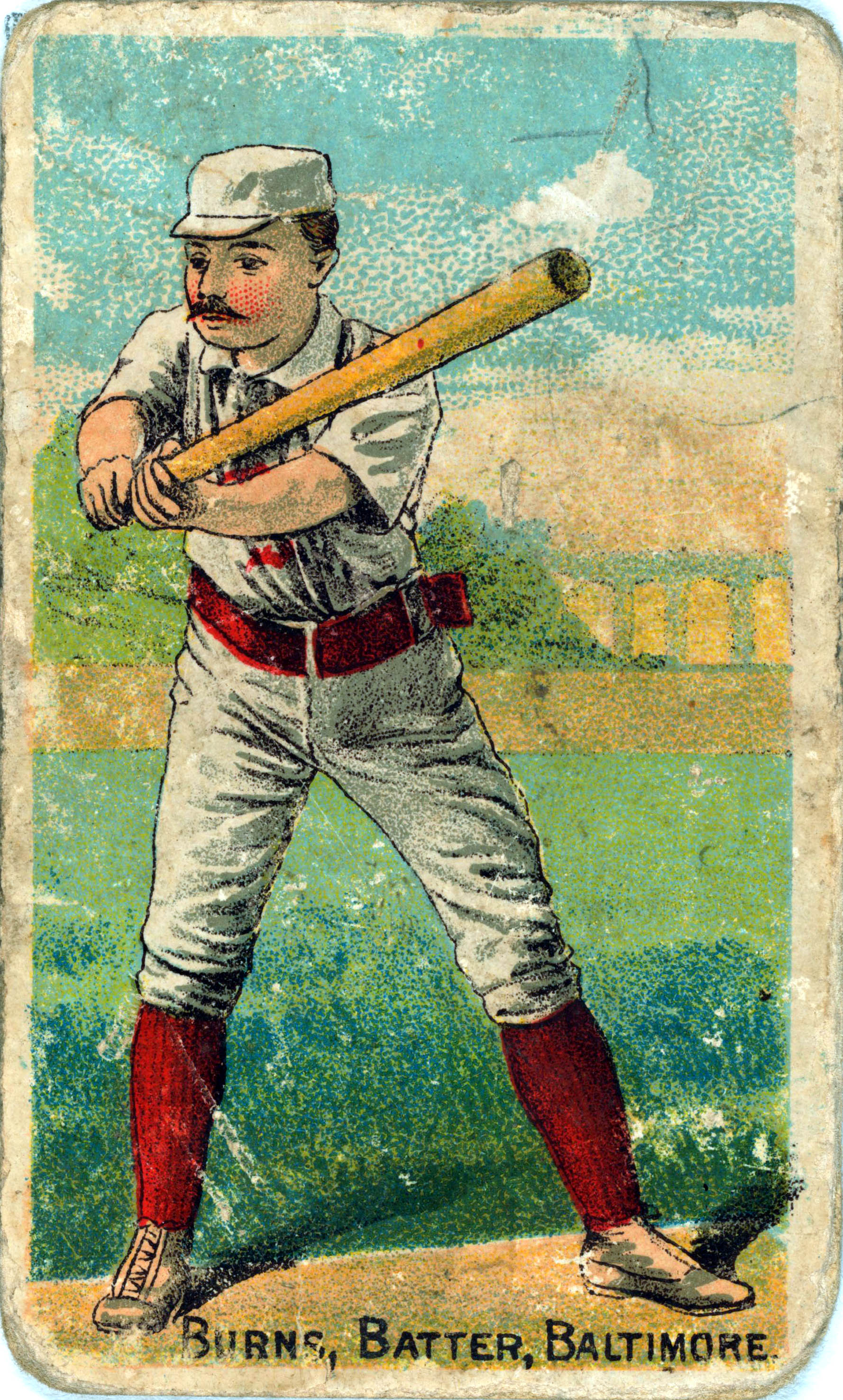
Oyster Burns is the only National League RBI champion from 1880 to 1902 not elected to the Hall of Fame.

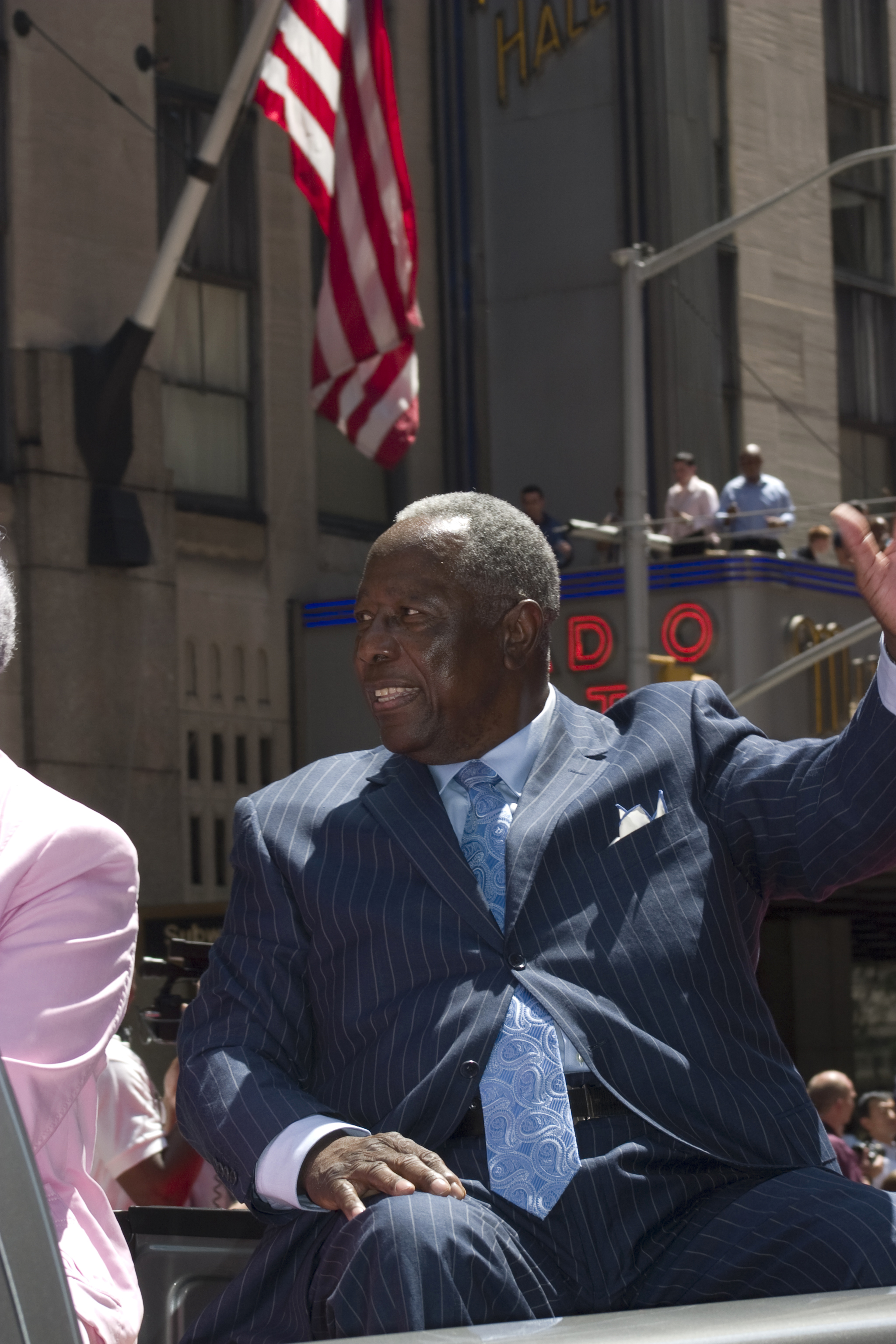
Hank Aaron holds the most career RBI and led the National League in four non-consecutive seasons.

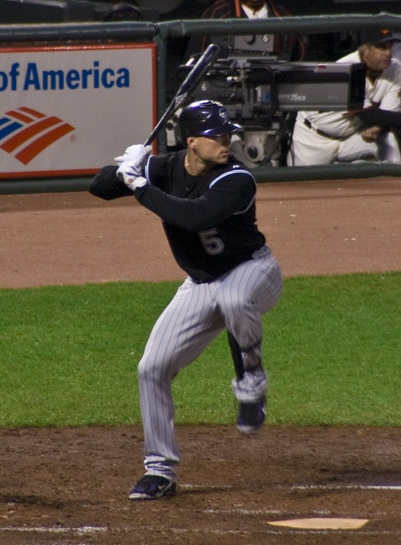
Matt Holliday won the RBI title in 2007, breaking a potential record-breaking streak of four consecutive championships for Ryan Howard.

Year	Winner(s)	RBI	Team(s)	Runner(s)-up	2nd RBI	Ref
1876	Deacon White^{†}	60	Chicago White Stockings	Paul Hines; Cap Anson^{†} Ross Barnes	59	
1877	Deacon White^{†}	49	Boston Red Caps	John Peters	41	
1878	Paul Hines	50	Providence Grays	Lew Brown	43	
1879	John O'Rourke; Charley Jones	62	Boston Red Caps	Buttercup Dickerson	57	
1880	Cap Anson^{†}	74	Chicago White Stockings	King Kelly^{†}	60	
1881	Cap Anson^{†}	82	Chicago White Stockings	Charlie Bennett	64	
1882	Cap Anson^{†}	83	Chicago White Stockings	Dan Brouthers^{†}	63	
1883	Dan Brouthers^{†}	97	Buffalo Bisons	Jack Burdock	88	
1884	Cap Anson^{†}	102	Chicago White Stockings	Fred Pfeffer	101	
1885	Cap Anson^{†}	108	Chicago White Stockings	King Kelly^{†}	75	
1886	Cap Anson^{†}	147	Chicago White Stockings	Fred Pfeffer	95	
1887	Sam Thompson^{†}	166	Detroit Wolverines	Roger Connor^{†}	104	
1888	Cap Anson^{†}	84	Chicago White Stockings	Billy Nash	75	
1889	Roger Connor^{†}	130	New York Giants	Dan Brouthers^{†}	118	
1890	Oyster Burns	128	Brooklyn Bridegrooms	Cap Anson^{†}	107	
1891	Cap Anson^{†}	120	Chicago Colts	Harry Stovey	95	
1892	Dan Brouthers^{†}	124	Brooklyn Grooms	Sam Thompson^{†}	104	
1893	Ed Delahanty^{†}	146	Philadelphia Phillies	Ed McKean	133	
1894	Sam Thompson^{†}	147	Philadelphia Phillies	Hugh Duffy^{†}	145	
1895	Sam Thompson^{†}	165	Philadelphia Phillies	Joe Kelley^{†}	134	
1896	Ed Delahanty^{†}	126	Philadelphia Phillies	Hughie Jennings^{†}	121	
1897	George Davis^{†}	135	New York Giants	Jimmy Collins^{†}	132	
1898	Nap Lajoie^{†}	127	Philadelphia Phillies	Jimmy Collins^{†}	111	
1899	Ed Delahanty^{†}	137	Philadelphia Phillies	Buck Freeman	122	
1900	Elmer Flick^{†}	110	Philadelphia Phillies	Ed Delahanty^{†}	109	
1901	Honus Wagner^{†}	126	Pittsburgh Pirates	Ed Delahanty^{†}	108	
1902	Honus Wagner^{†}	91	Pittsburgh Pirates	Tommy Leach	85	
1903	Sam Mertes	104	New York Giants	Honus Wagner^{†}	101	
1904	Bill Dahlen	80	New York Giants	Sam Mertes; Harry Lumley	78	
1905	Cy Seymour	121	Cincinnati Reds	Sam Mertes	108	
1906	Harry Steinfeldt; Jim Nealon	83	Chicago Cubs; Pittsburgh Pirates	Cy Seymour	80	
1907	Sherry Magee	85	Philadelphia Phillies	Ed Abbaticchio; Honus Wagner^{†}	82	
1908	Honus Wagner^{†}	109	Pittsburgh Pirates	Mike Donlin	106	
1909	Honus Wagner^{†}	100	Pittsburgh Pirates	Red Murray	91	
1910	Sherry Magee	123	Philadelphia Phillies	Mike Mitchell	88	
1911	Chief Wilson; Frank Schulte	107	Pittsburgh Pirates; Chicago Cubs	Fred Luderus	99	
1912	Honus Wagner^{†}	102	Pittsburgh Pirates	Bill Sweeney	100	
1913	Gavvy Cravath	128	Philadelphia Phillies	Heinie Zimmerman	95	
1914	Sherry Magee	103	Philadelphia Phillies	Gavvy Cravath	100	
1915	Gavvy Cravath	115	Philadelphia Phillies	Sherry Magee	87	
1916	Heinie Zimmerman	83	Chicago Cubs; New York Giants	Hal Chase	82	
1917	Heinie Zimmerman	102	New York Giants	Hal Chase	86	
1918	Sherry Magee	76	Cincinnati Reds	George Cutshaw	68	
1919	Hy Myers	73	Brooklyn Robins	Edd Roush^{†} Rogers Hornsby^{†}	71	
1920	Rogers Hornsby^{†} George Kelly^{†}	94	St. Louis Cardinals; New York Giants	Edd Roush^{†}	90	
1921	Rogers Hornsby^{†}	126	St. Louis Cardinals	George Kelly^{†}	122	
1922	Rogers Hornsby^{†}	152	St. Louis Cardinals	Irish Meusel	132	
1923	Irish Meusel	125	New York Giants	Cy Williams	114	
1924	George Kelly^{†}	136	New York Giants	Jack Fournier	116	
1925	Rogers Hornsby^{†}	143	St. Louis Cardinals	Jack Fournier	130	
1926	Jim Bottomley^{†}	120	St. Louis Cardinals	Hack Wilson^{†}	109	
1927	Paul Waner^{†}	131	Pittsburgh Pirates	Hack Wilson^{†}	129	
1928	Jim Bottomley^{†}	136	St. Louis Cardinals	Pie Traynor^{†}	124	
1929	Hack Wilson^{†}	159	Chicago Cubs	Mel Ott^{†}	151	
1930	Hack Wilson^{†}	191	Chicago Cubs	Chuck Klein^{†}	170	
1931	Chuck Klein^{†}	121	Philadelphia Phillies	Mel Ott^{†}	115	
1932	Don Hurst	143	Philadelphia Phillies	Chuck Klein^{†}	137	
1933	Chuck Klein^{†}	120	Philadelphia Phillies	Wally Berger	106	
1934	Mel Ott^{†}	135	New York Giants	Ripper Collins	128	
1935	Wally Berger	130	Boston Braves	Joe Medwick^{†}	126	
1936	Joe Medwick^{†}	138	St. Louis Cardinals	Mel Ott^{†}	135	
1937	Joe Medwick^{†}	154	St. Louis Cardinals	Frank Demaree	115	
1938	Joe Medwick^{†}	122	St. Louis Cardinals	Mel Ott^{†}	116	
1939	Frank McCormick	128	Cincinnati Reds	Joe Medwick^{†}	117	
1940	Johnny Mize^{†}	137	St. Louis Cardinals	Frank McCormick	127	
1941	Dolph Camilli	120	Brooklyn Dodgers	Babe Young	104	
1942	Johnny Mize^{†}	110	New York Giants	Dolph Camilli	109	
1943	Bill Nicholson	128	Chicago Cubs	Bob Elliott	101	
1944	Bill Nicholson	122	Chicago Cubs	Bob Elliott	108	
1945	Dixie Walker	124	Brooklyn Dodgers	Tommy Holmes	117	
1946	Enos Slaughter^{†}	130	St. Louis Cardinals	Dixie Walker	116	
1947	Johnny Mize^{†}	138	New York Giants	Ralph Kiner^{†}	127	
1948	Stan Musial^{†}	131	St. Louis Cardinals	Johnny Mize^{†}	125	
1949	Ralph Kiner^{†}	127	Pittsburgh Pirates	Jackie Robinson^{†}	124	
1950	Del Ennis	126	Philadelphia Phillies	Ralph Kiner^{†}	118	
1951	Monte Irvin^{†}	121	New York Giants	Ralph Kiner^{†} Sid Gordon	109	
1952	Hank Sauer	121	Chicago Cubs	Bobby Thomson	108	
1953	Roy Campanella^{†}	142	Brooklyn Dodgers	Eddie Mathews^{†}	135	
1954	Ted Kluszewski	141	Cincinnati Reds	Duke Snider^{†}	130	
1955	Duke Snider^{†}	136	Brooklyn Dodgers	Willie Mays^{†}	127	
1956	Stan Musial^{†}	109	St. Louis Cardinals	Joe Adcock	103	
1957	Hank Aaron^{†}	132	Milwaukee Braves	Del Ennis	105	
1958	Ernie Banks^{†}	129	Chicago Cubs	Frank Thomas	109	
1959	Ernie Banks^{†}	143	Chicago Cubs	Frank Robinson^{†}	125	
1960	Hank Aaron^{†}	126	Milwaukee Braves	Eddie Mathews^{†}	124	
1961	Orlando Cepeda^{†}	142	San Francisco Giants	Frank Robinson^{†}	124	
1962	Tommy Davis	153	Los Angeles Dodgers	Willie Mays^{†}	141	
1963	Hank Aaron^{†}	130	Milwaukee Braves	Ken Boyer	111	
1964	Ken Boyer	119	St. Louis Cardinals	Ron Santo^{†}	114	
1965	Deron Johnson	130	Cincinnati Reds	Frank Robinson^{†}	113	
1966	Hank Aaron^{†}	127	Atlanta Braves	Roberto Clemente^{†}	119	
1967	Orlando Cepeda^{†}	111	St. Louis Cardinals	Roberto Clemente^{†}	110	
1968	Willie McCovey^{†}	105	San Francisco Giants	Ron Santo^{†} Billy Williams^{†}	98	
1969	Willie McCovey^{†}	126	San Francisco Giants	Ron Santo^{†}	123	
1970	Johnny Bench^{†}	148	Cincinnati Reds	Tony Perez^{†} Billy Williams^{†}	129	
1971	Joe Torre^{†}	137	St. Louis Cardinals	Willie Stargell^{†}	125	
1972	Johnny Bench^{†}	125	Cincinnati Reds	Billy Williams^{†}	122	
1973	Willie Stargell^{†}	119	Pittsburgh Pirates	Lee May	105	
1974	Johnny Bench^{†}	129	Cincinnati Reds	Mike Schmidt^{†}	116	
1975	Greg Luzinski	120	Philadelphia Phillies	Johnny Bench^{†}	110	
1976	George Foster	121	Cincinnati Reds	Joe Morgan^{†}	111	
1977	George Foster	149	Cincinnati Reds	Greg Luzinski	130	
1978	George Foster	120	Cincinnati Reds	Dave Parker^{†}	117	
1979	Dave Winfield^{†}	118	San Diego Padres	Dave Kingman	115	
1980	Mike Schmidt^{†}	121	Philadelphia Phillies	George Hendrick	109	
1981	Mike Schmidt^{†}	91	Philadelphia Phillies	George Foster	90	
1982	Dale Murphy; Al Oliver	109	Atlanta Braves; Montreal Expos	Bill Buckner	105	
1983	Dale Murphy	121	Atlanta Braves	Andre Dawson^{†}	113	
1984	Mike Schmidt^{†} Gary Carter^{†}	106	Philadelphia Phillies; Montreal Expos	Dale Murphy	100	
1985	Dave Parker^{†}	125	Cincinnati Reds	Dale Murphy	111	
1986	Mike Schmidt^{†}	119	Philadelphia Phillies	Dave Parker^{†}	116	
1987	Andre Dawson^{†}	137	Chicago Cubs	Tim Wallach	123	
1988	Will Clark	109	San Francisco Giants	Darryl Strawberry	101	
1989	Kevin Mitchell	125	San Francisco Giants	Pedro Guerrero	117	
1990	Matt Williams	122	San Francisco Giants	Bobby Bonilla	120	
1991	Howard Johnson	117	New York Mets	Will Clark	116	
1992	Darren Daulton	109	Philadelphia Phillies	Terry Pendleton	105	
1993	Barry Bonds	123	San Francisco Giants	David Justice	120	
1994	Jeff Bagwell^{†}	116	Houston Astros	Matt Williams	96	
1995	Dante Bichette	128	Colorado Rockies	Sammy Sosa	119	
1996	Andrés Galarraga	150	Colorado Rockies	Dante Bichette	141	
1997	Andrés Galarraga	140	Colorado Rockies	Jeff Bagwell^{†}	135	
1998	Sammy Sosa	158	Chicago Cubs	Mark McGwire	147	
1999	Mark McGwire	147	St. Louis Cardinals	Matt Williams	142	
2000	Todd Helton^{†}	147	Colorado Rockies	Sammy Sosa	138	
2001	Sammy Sosa	160	Chicago Cubs	Todd Helton^{†}	146	
2002	Lance Berkman	128	Houston Astros	Albert Pujols	127	
2003	Preston Wilson	141	Colorado Rockies	Gary Sheffield	132	
2004	Vinny Castilla	131	Colorado Rockies	Scott Rolen^{†}	124	
2005	Andruw Jones^{†}	128	Atlanta Braves	Albert Pujols	117	
2006	Ryan Howard	149	Philadelphia Phillies	Albert Pujols	137	
2007	Matt Holliday	137	Colorado Rockies	Ryan Howard	136	
2008	Ryan Howard	146	Philadelphia Phillies	David Wright	124	
2009	Prince Fielder; Ryan Howard	141	Milwaukee Brewers; Philadelphia Phillies	Albert Pujols	135	
2010	Albert Pujols	118	St. Louis Cardinals	Carlos Gonzalez	117	
2011	Matt Kemp	126	Los Angeles Dodgers	Prince Fielder	120	
2012	Chase Headley	115	San Diego Padres	Ryan Braun	112	
2013	Paul Goldschmidt	125	Arizona Diamondbacks	Freddie Freeman; Jay Bruce	109	
2014	Adrián González	116	Los Angeles Dodgers	Giancarlo Stanton	105	
2015	Nolan Arenado	130	Colorado Rockies	Paul Goldschmidt	110	
2016	Nolan Arenado	133	Colorado Rockies	Anthony Rizzo	109	
2017	Giancarlo Stanton	132	Miami Marlins	Nolan Arenado	130	
2018	Javier Báez	111	Chicago Cubs	Nolan Arenado; Christian Yelich	110	
2019	Anthony Rendon	126	Washington Nationals	Freddie Freeman	121	
2020	Marcell Ozuna	56	Atlanta Braves	Freddie Freeman	53	
2021	Adam Duvall	113	Atlanta Braves	Austin Riley	107	
2022	Pete Alonso	131	New York Mets	Paul Goldschmidt	115	
2023	Matt Olson	139	Atlanta Braves	Pete Alonso	118	
2024	Shohei Ohtani	130	Los Angeles Dodgers	Willy Adames	112	
2025	Kyle Schwarber	132	Philadelphia Phillies	Pete Alonso	126	
2026	Alec Burleson	116	St. Louis Cardinals	Sal Stewart	111	

== Other major leagues ==
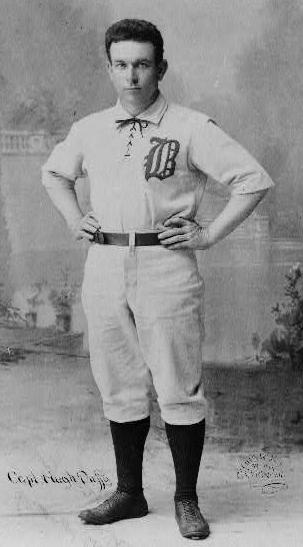
Hugh Duffy tied for the 1891 American Association RBI title and lost the 1894 National League title by two RBI.

Year	Winner(s)	RBI	Team(s)	League	Runner(s)-up	2nd RBI	Ref
1882	Hick Carpenter	67	Cincinnati Red Stockings	American Association	Pop Snyder	50	
1883	Charley Jones	80	Cincinnati Red Stockings	American Association	John Reilly^{†}	79	
1884	Dave Orr	112	New York Metropolitans	American Association	John Reilly^{†}	91	
1885	Frank Fennelly	89	Cincinnati Red Stockings	American Association	Henry Larkin	88	
1886	Tip O'Neill	107	St. Louis Browns	American Association	Pop Corkhill	97	
1887	Tip O'Neill	123	St. Louis Browns	American Association	Pete Browning	118	
1888	John Reilly	103	Cincinnati Red Stockings	American Association	Henry Larkin	101	
1889	Harry Stovey	119	Philadelphia Athletics	American Association	Dave Foutz	113	
1890	Spud Johnson	113	Columbus Solons	American Association	Chicken Wolf	98	
1890	Hardy Richardson	146	Brooklyn Ward's Wonders	Players' League	Dave Orr	124	
1891	Duke Farrell; Hugh Duffy^{†}	110	Boston Reds	American Association	Dan Brouthers^{†}	109	
1914	Frank LaPorte	107	Indianapolis Hoosiers	Federal League	Steve Evans	96	
1915	Dutch Zwilling	94	Pittsburgh Rebels	Federal League	Ed Konetchy	93	

== Negro Major Leagues ==
=== Negro National League I ===
Year	Leader	RBI	Team	Runner-up	RBI	Ref
1920	Ben Taylor^{†}	64	Indianapolis ABCs	Cristóbal Torriente^{†}	60	
1921	Oscar Charleston^{†}	91	St. Louis Giants	Ben Taylor^{†}, Charlie Blackwell	89	
1922	Oscar Charleston^{†}	102	Indianapolis ABCs	Biz Mackey^{†}	83	
1923	Heavy Johnson	120	Kansas City Monarchs	Oscar Charleston^{†}	94	
1924	Cristóbal Torriente^{†}	81	Chicago American Giants	Newt Joseph	68	
1925	Turkey Stearnes^{†}	126	Detroit Stars	Willie Bobo	84	
1926	Mule Suttles^{†}	130	Stars	Dewey Creacy	107	
1927	Turkey Stearnes^{†}	114	Detroit Stars	Willie Wells^{†}	108	
1928	Wilson Redus	82	St. Louis Stars	Willie Wells^{†}	81	
1929	Willie Wells^{†}	128	St. Louis Stars / Chicago American Giants	Mule Suttles^{†}	110	
1930	Willie Wells^{†}	114	St. Louis Stars	Dewey Creacy	73	
1931	Mule Suttles^{†}	36	St. Louis Stars	Turkey Stearnes^{†}	33	

=== Eastern Colored League ===
Year	Leader	RBI	Team	Runner-up	RBI	Ref
1923	George Johnson	46	Hilldale Club	Jud Wilson^{†}, Biz Mackey^{†}	44	
1924	Oscar Charleston^{†}	63	Harrisburg Giants	Jud Wilson^{†}	53	
1925	Oscar Charleston^{†}	97	Harrisburg Giants	Walter Cannady	86	
1926	Clint Thomas	78	Hilldale Club	Biz Mackey^{†}	76	
1927	Dick Lundy	76	Atlantic City Bacharach Giants	Oscar Charleston^{†}	74	
1928	Rap Dixon	58	Baltimore Black Sox	George Carr	53	

=== American Negro League ===
Year	Leader	RBI	Team	Runner-up	RBI	Ref
1929	Rap Dixon	92	Baltimore Black Sox	Chino Smith	81	

=== East–West League ===
Year	Leader	RBI	Team	Runner-up	RBI	Ref
1932	Mule Suttles^{†}	48	Detroit Wolves / Washington Pilots	Tom Finley	43	

=== Negro Southern League ===
Year	Leader	RBI	Team	Runner-up	RBI	Ref
1932	Red Parnell	50	Monroe Monarchs	Steel Arm Davis	29	

=== Negro National League II ===
Year	Leader	RBI	Team	Runner-up	RBI	Ref
1933	Josh Gibson^{†}	74	Pittsburgh Crawfords	Oscar Charleston^{†}	66	
1934	Josh Gibson^{†}	59	Pittsburgh Crawfords	Jake Dunn	43	
1935	Josh Gibson^{†}	57	Pittsburgh Crawfords	Turkey Stearnes^{†}, Jud Wilson^{†}	52	
1936	Josh Gibson^{†}	66	Pittsburgh Crawfords	Turkey Stearnes^{†}	43	
1937	Josh Gibson^{†}	73	Homestead Grays	Buck Leonard^{†}	55	
1938	Josh Gibson^{†}	54	Homestead Grays	Buck Leonard^{†}	53	
1939	Buck Leonard^{†}	48	Homestead Grays	Josh Gibson^{†}	46	
1940	Howard Easterling	45	Homestead Grays	Buck Leonard^{†}	41	
1941	Bill Hoskins	50	Baltimore Elite Giants / New York Black Yankees	Monte Irvin^{†}	48	
1942	Lennie Pearson	56	Newark Eagles / Homestead Grays	Josh Gibson^{†}	52	
1943	Josh Gibson^{†}	109	Homestead Grays	Buck Leonard^{†}	63	
1944	Marvin Williams	50	Philadelphia Stars	Josh Gibson^{†}	49	
1945	Roy Campanella^{†}	47	Baltimore Elite Giants	Bill Hoskins	42	
1946	Lennie Pearson	61	Newark Eagles	Monte Irvin^{†}	54	
1947	Butch Davis, Henry Kimbro	52	Baltimore Elite Giants	Monte Irvin^{†}	47	
1948	Lester Lockett	53	Baltimore Elite Giants	Luke Easter, Frank Russell	37	

=== Negro American League ===
Year	Leader	RBI	Team	Runner-up	RBI	Ref
1937	Willard Brown^{†}	60	Kansas City Monarchs	Newt Allen	50	
1938	Willard Brown^{†}	48	Kansas City Monarchs	Donald Reeves	34	
1939	Willard Brown^{†}	42	Kansas City Monarchs	Turkey Stearnes^{†}	39	
1940	Turkey Stearnes^{†}	33	Kansas City Monarchs	Bill Williams	28	
1941	Willard Brown^{†}	32	Kansas City Monarchs	Ted Strong	27	
1942	Ted Strong	32	Kansas City Monarchs	Willard Brown^{†}	26	
1943	Willard Brown^{†}	31	Kansas City Monarchs	Lester Lockett, Barney Serrell	25	
1944	Lee Moody	26	Kansas City Monarchs	Ed Steele, Barney Serrell	23	
1945	Herb Souell	33	Kansas City Monarchs	Johnny Smith, Johnie Scott	31	
1946	Willard Brown^{†}	27	Kansas City Monarchs	Ted Strong	23	
1947	Willard Brown^{†}	64	Kansas City Monarchs	Buck O'Neil^{†} (Note: Inducted into the Hall of Fame as a baseball pioneer/executive, not as a player.)	37	
1948	Willard Brown^{†}	54	Kansas City Monarchs	Hank Thompson	29	
