= Bunny Downs =

American baseball player (1894–1973)

- Infielder / Manager
- Born: March 7, 1894; Chattanooga, Tennessee, U.S.
- Died: June 30, 1973 (aged 79); Winston-Salem, North Carolina, U.S.
- Batted: Right Threw: Right

debut
- 1914, for the West Baden Sprudels

Last appearance
- 1929, for the Hilldale Club
- Stats at Baseball Reference
- Managerial record at Baseball Reference

Teams
- West Baden Sprudels (1914, 1915); Louisville White Sox (1915); St. Louis Giants (1916); Philadelphia All Stars (1917); Victory's All Stars (1917); Bacharach Giants (1917–1918, 1923); Hilldale Club (1917–1922, 1929); Brooklyn Royal Giants (1923–1925); Harrisburg Giants (1925); Wilmington Potomacs (1925); Philadelphia Tigers (1928); Indianapolis Clowns (1943, 1951-1955) (Manager)

McKinley "Bunny" Downs (March 7, 1894 - June 30, 1973) was an American Negro league baseball infielder and manager for several years before the founding of the first Negro National League, and in its first several seasons. While working for the Indianapolis Clowns in 1951, Downs scouted Hank Aaron, leading to a brief stint with the team in 1952.

A native of Chattanooga, Tennessee, Downs attended Morris Brown College in Atlanta, Georgia. He made his Negro leagues debut in 1914 with the West Baden Sprudels, and went on to play for several teams, including a six-year stretch from 1917 to 1922 with the Hilldale Club. His career continued as a field manager and scout for the Indianapolis Clowns (at the time located in Miami) in their early years. He returned to manage them in their championship years with players such as Hank Aaron, Goose Tatum, and Toni Stone. At age 56, Downs received votes listing him on the 1952 Pittsburgh Courier player-voted poll of the Negro leagues' best players ever. He died in Winston-Salem, North Carolina in 1973 at age 79.
