= Eugene Moore (baseball) =

- Outfielder
- Born: August 1888
- Died: Unknown

debut
- 1909, for the Birmingham Giants

Last appearance
- 1921, for the Detroit Stars

Teams
- Birmingham Giants (1909); West Baden Sprudels (1910, 1914); St. Louis Giants (1911, 1913, 1920); French Lick Plutos (1912); Lincoln Giants (1912–1914); Indianapolis ABCs (1914, 1919); Louisville White Sox (1915); Chicago Black Sox (1915); Detroit Stars (1920–1921)

Eugene Moore (August 1888 - death date unknown) was a Negro leagues outfielder for several years before the founding of the first Negro National League, and in its first couple seasons.
