= Henry Hannon =

American baseball player and manager

Henry H. Hannon, Jr.
- Outfielder / Manager
- Born: August 21, 1882; Montgomery, Alabama, U.S.
- Died: December 10, 1958 (aged 76); Montgomery, Alabama, U.S.
- Batted: Right Threw: Right

debut
- 1908, for the Cuban Giants

Last appearance
- 1914, for the French Lick Plutos

Teams
- As player: Cuban Giants (1908–1909); Philadelphia Giants (1909); St. Louis Giants (1911, 1913); Chicago Giants (1912); French Lick Plutos (1913–1914); Louisville White Sox (1914); As manager: Montgomery Grey Sox (1920, 1932)

Henry H. Hannon Jr. (August 21, 1882 – December 10, 1958) was an American Negro leagues outfielder and manager who played from 1908 to 1914 and later managed the Montgomery Grey Sox.
