= Luther O'Neal =

American baseball player (born 1889)

- Catcher
- Born: May 15, 1889; Lincoln County, Tennessee, U.S.
- Threw: Right

Negro league baseball debut
- 1910, for the West Baden Sprudels

Last appearance
- 1914, for the Indianapolis ABCs

Teams
- West Baden Sprudels (1910–1914); Louisville White Sox (1914); Indianapolis ABCs (1914)

Luther O'Neal (May 15, 1889 – death unknown) was an American Negro league catcher in the 1910s.

A native of Lincoln County, Tennessee, O'Neal made his Negro leagues debut in 1910 with the West Baden Sprudels. He played five seasons with the Sprudels, and also played for the Louisville White Sox and Indianapolis ABCs in 1914.
