= George Dandy =

- Pitcher
- Born: December 3, 1890; Columbus, Georgia, U.S.
- Died: October 6, 1946 (aged 55); Pittsburgh, Pennsylvania, U.S.
- Batted: Unknown Threw: Left

debut
- 1912, for the Chicago American Giants

Last appearance
- 1917, for the Lincoln Giants

Teams
- Chicago American Giants (1912); Chicago Royal Giants (1914); West Baden Sprudels (1915); Louisville White Sox (1915); Lincoln Giants (1917)

George Dandy (December 3, 1890 – October 6, 1946) was an American Negro leagues pitcher for several years before the founding of the first Negro National League.

He was a left-handed pitcher who pitched for the Chicago American Giants, West Baden Sprudels, and Lincoln Giants.

Dandy is buried in the Allegheny Cemetery in Pittsburgh.
