= James Lynch (baseball) =

American baseball player (1888–??)

- Outfielder
- Born: December 25, 1888; San Antonio, Texas, U.S.
- Batted: Right Threw: Right

Negro league baseball debut
- 1912, for the French Lick Plutos

Last appearance
- 1926, for the Dayton Marcos

Teams
- French Lick Plutos (1912–1914); West Baden Sprudels (1914); Indianapolis ABCs (1917); Dayton Marcos (1918, 1926)

James Lynch (December 25, 1888 – death unknown) was an American Negro league outfielder in the 1910s and 1920s.

A native of San Antonio, Texas, Lynch made his Negro leagues debut in 1912 with the French Lick Plutos. He went on to play for the West Baden Sprudels, Indianapolis ABCs, and Dayton Marcos through 1918, and briefly played for the Marcos again in 1926 when they joined the Negro National League.
