= Wesley Pryor =

- Third baseman
- Batted: Left Threw: Right

Negro league baseball debut
- 1908, for the Chicago Union Giants

Last appearance
- 1914, for the Louisville White Sox

Teams
- Chicago Union Giants (1908); Cuban Stars (West) (1909); Leland Giants (1910–1911); Chicago American Giants (1911); St. Louis Giants (1912); Brooklyn Royal Giants (1913); New York Lincoln Stars (1914); Schenectady Mohawk Giants (1914); Louisville White Sox (1914)

Wesley Pryor was an American professional baseball third baseman in the pre-Negro leagues. He played mostly from 1908 to 1914 with several teams.
