= Steel Arm Johnny Taylor =

American baseball player (1879–1956)

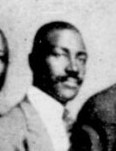
- Pitcher / Manager
- Born: August 12, 1879; Anderson, South Carolina, U.S.
- Died: March 25, 1956 (aged 76); Peoria, Illinois, U.S.
- Batted: Right Threw: Right

Teams
- Greenwood, South Carolina Red Stockings (1898); Greenville, South Carolina (1898); Anderson, South Carolina (1899–1900); Birmingham Giants (1903–1909); St. Paul Colored Gophers (1909); Chicago Giants (1910); West Baden Sprudels (1910); St. Louis Giants (1911); West Baden Sprudels (1912–1913); St. Louis Giants (1913); Chicago American Giants (1913); Indianapolis ABCs (1914); Louisville White Sox (1915); Indianapolis ABCs (1916); Bowser's ABCs (1916); Hilldale Daisies (1917); Bacharach Giants (1919); Peoria, IL Black Devils (1920); Indianapolis ABCs (1920); Washington Potomacs (1924)

Career highlights and awards
- Pitched a no-hitter June 5, 1910 in Chicago

John Boyce Taylor (August 12, 1879 – March 25, 1956) was an American pitcher and played in professional pre-league and Negro league baseball from 1903 to 1925. He was the second-oldest of four baseball-playing brothers, the others being Charles, Benjamin, and James.

== Early life ==
Taylor was the seventh of ten children born to Isham and Madeline Taylor just outside of Anderson, South Carolina. It is likely both of his parents were born enslaved. Isham was a farm laborer who also served as a pastor.

== Baseball career ==
Taylor was given his baseball nickname, "Steel-Arm Johnnie," by a white sportswriter for the Charlotte Observer (a predominantly white paper during the time) wrote about Taylor's great speed, when he pitched for Biddle University in Charlotte, North Carolina in 1898. In the summer of 1898, he played two months for the Greenwood, South Carolina Red Stockings, and finished the season with the Greenville, South Carolina team.

In 1899 and 1900, Taylor pitched for his home club in Anderson, South Carolina where he reportedly won 90 percent of his games.

During the spring months of 1899 and later in 1905, he coached the Biddle University team.

He pitched the 1903 season for the Birmingham Giants where he pitched from thirty to forty games per season. He also reportedly never lost over seven games per season while at Birmingham. All four brothers were on that team by 1908, and he beat Hall of Famer Joe Williams 1–0 in San Antonio, striking out the side with the bases loaded in the ninth inning.

In the Spring of 1908, Taylor coached the M. and I College team of Holly Springs, Mississippi, developing players like Cobb and Pinson, who both went on to become the battery for the Birmingham Giants.

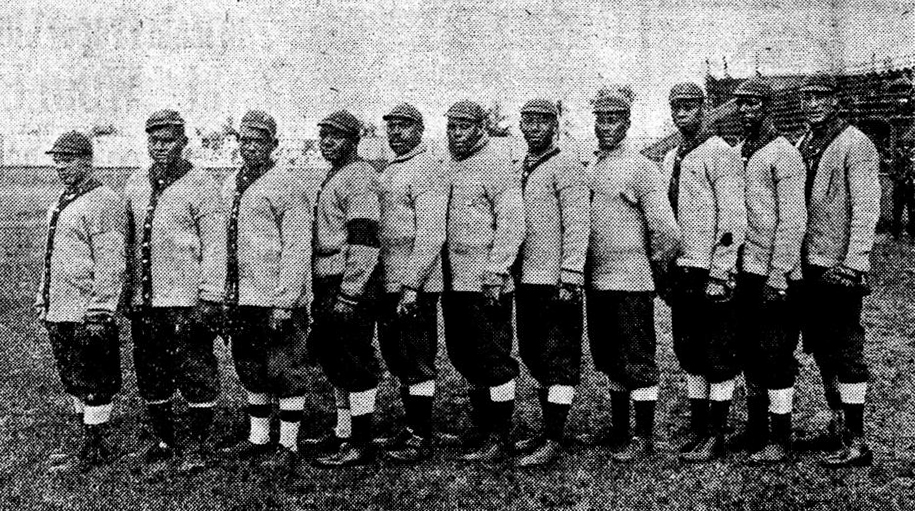
1910 St. Paul Gophers

Taylor pitched for the St. Paul Colored Gophers in 1909, helping them claim a share of the western championship that year, posting a combined record of 37-6 between Birmingham and St. Paul. He pitched for the Chicago Giants in 1910, the St. Louis Giants in 1911, the West Baden Sprudels in 1912, and the Chicago American Giants in 1913 before reuniting with his brothers in 1914 on the Indianapolis ABCs. He also pitched in an 1912 exhibition game against the Cincinnati Reds.

When the Negro Leagues started in 1920, Taylor managed the Peoria, Illinois Black Devils for half a season, joining the Indianapolis ABCs again on June 21, 1920. Then 40-year-old Taylor pitched at least 3 known games that year.

Taylor pitched professionally until 1925.

During his years of coaching college baseball, it was said he reportedly never used tobacco, and did not drink alcohol and often emphasized to his players the virtues of clean living and hard work.

Taylor's grave was unmarked for 51 years, until researchers with the Negro Leagues Baseball Grave Marker Project put a proper gravestone on his grave in 2007.
