= Tick Houston =

American professional baseball player

- Infielder
- Threw: Right

Negro league baseball debut
- 1909, for the Birmingham Giants

Last appearance
- 1920, for the Kansas City Monarchs
- Stats at Baseball Reference

Teams
- Birmingham Giants (1909); West Baden Sprudels (1910); Louisville White Sox (1914–1915); Indianapolis ABCs (1919–1920); Kansas City Monarchs (1920)

W. E. "Tick" Houston was a Negro league infielder between 1909 and 1920.

Houston made his Negro leagues debut in 1909 with the Birmingham Giants. He went on to play for several teams through 1920, including the West Baden Sprudels, Louisville White Sox, Indianapolis ABCs, and Kansas City Monarchs.
