= Ted Kimbro =

American baseball player

- Infielder
- Born: September 8, 1895; St. Louis, Missouri, U.S.
- Died: September 29, 1918 (aged 23); Fort Dix, New Jersey, U.S.
- Threw: Right

Negro league baseball debut
- 1914, for the West Baden Sprudels

Last appearance
- 1918, for the Hilldale Club

Teams
- West Baden Sprudels (1914–1915); Louisville White Sox (1915); St. Louis Giants (1915–1916); Lincoln Giants (1917–1918); Hilldale Club (1918)

Ted Kimbro (September 8, 1895 – September 29, 1918) was an American Negro league baseball infielder in the 1910s.

== Early life and career ==
A native of St. Louis, Missouri, Kimbro made his Negro leagues debut in 1914 for the West Baden Sprudels. He went on to play for the Louisville White Sox, St. Louis Giants, and Lincoln Giants, and finished his career in 1918 with the Hilldale Club. Kimbro served in the US Army during World War I, and died in 1918 at age 23 at Camp Dix as a result of the flu pandemic.
