= Bruce Hocker =

American baseball player (1894–1975)

- First baseman
- Born: August 6, 1894; Jeffersonville, Indiana, U.S.
- Died: August 1, 1975 (aged 80); Baltimore, Maryland, U.S.

debut
- 1913, for the West Baden Sprudels

Last appearance
- 1920, for the Dayton Marcos
- Stats at Baseball Reference

Teams
- West Baden Sprudels (1913–1914); Louisville White Sox (1915); Chicago Black Sox (1915); Indianapolis ABCs (1916, 1919); Lincoln Stars (1916); Pennsylvania Red Caps of New York (1917); Hilldale Club (1918); Dayton Marcos (1920)

Bruce William Hocker (August 6, 1894 – August 1, 1975) was an American Negro leagues first baseman for several years before the founding of the first Negro National League.

Hocker registered for the World War I draft on June 5, 1917, showing his current occupation as a "musician" at the Kipps Parkway Hotel on "South Boulevard in Bronx Park." He is listed as single and no exemptions from the draft.
