= Ben Lyons (disambiguation) =

Ben Lyons is a critic.

Benjamin, Ben, or Bennie Lyons may also refer to:

- Bennie Lyons (1882–?), American baseball player
- Ben Lyons, character in The Lyons

== See also ==
- Ben Lyon
