= Henry McLaughlin =

American baseball player

- Pitcher
- Born: August 24, 1886; Brookhaven, Mississippi, U.S.
- Died: March 18, 1922 (aged 35); Los Angeles, California, U.S.

Negro league baseball debut
- 1912, for the French Lick Plutos

Last appearance
- 1919, for the Lincoln Giants

Teams
- French Lick Plutos (1912–1914); West Baden Sprudels (1915); Lincoln Giants (1917–1919)

Henry Mack McLaughlin (August 24, 1886 – March 18, 1922) was an American Negro league pitcher in the 1910s.

A native of Brookhaven, Mississippi, McLaughlin made his Negro leagues debut in 1912 with the French Lick Plutos. He later played for the West Baden Sprudels, and finished his career with the Lincoln Giants from 1917 to 1919. McLaughlin died in Los Angeles, California in 1922 at age 35.
