= String Bean Williams =

American baseball player (1873–1929)

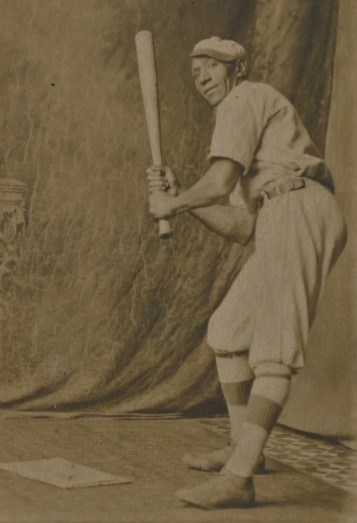
- Pitcher / Manager
- Born: 1873; Cairo, Illinois, U.S.
- Died: October 28, 1929; The Bronx, New York U.S.
- Batted: Right Threw: Right

Teams
- West Baden Sprudels (1909–1911, 1913–1914); Indianapolis ABCs (1911–1914, 1917–1918); Louisville White Sox (1914); San Francisco Park (1915); St. Louis Giants (1915–1916); Brooklyn Royal Giants (1916–1917, 1923, 1928); Pennsylvania Red Caps of New York (1918); Dayton Marcos (1919); Chicago American Giants (1919); Bacharach Giants (1920–1922, 1924); Washington Potomacs (1923–1924); Lincoln Giants (1925); Colored Athletics (1926); Ewing's All Stars (1928)

Andrew Williams (1873 – October 28, 1929), nicknamed "String Bean", was an American Negro leagues pitcher and manager, playing for many teams, including the Indianapolis ABCs and the Brooklyn Royal Giants.

At age 50 in 1923, Williams made his major league debut for the Brooklyn Royal Giants; to this day, this makes him the oldest debutant in major league history. By 1926, in Williams's later years, one paper appears to list Williams as a submarine pitcher.

Williams received votes listing him on the 1952 Pittsburgh Courier player-voted poll of the Negro Leagues' best players ever.
