= Oscar Goines =

American baseball player

- Third baseman
- Born: July 4, 1893; Seattle, Washington, U.S.
- Threw: Right

Negro league baseball debut
- 1915, for the West Baden Sprudels

Last appearance
- 1917, for the Jewell's ABCs

Teams
- West Baden Sprudels (1915); Louisville White Sox (1915); Jewell's ABCs (1917)

Oscar Goines (July 4, 1893 – death date unknown) was an American Negro league third baseman in the 1910s.

A native of Seattle, Washington, Goines played for the West Baden Sprudels and the Louisville White Sox in 1915, and went on to play for the Jewell's ABCs club in 1917. In eight recorded games, he posted six hits in 33 plate appearances.
