= Lorenza Cobb =

American baseball player (1888–1953)

- Catcher
- Born: February 10, 1888; Hernando, Mississippi, U.S.
- Died: January 21, 1953 (aged 64)
- Batted: Unknown Threw: Right

debut
- 1914, for the Indianapolis ABCs

Last appearance
- 1920, for the St. Louis Giants
- Stats at Baseball Reference

Teams
- Indianapolis ABCs (1914, 1917); West Baden Sprudels (1914); St. Louis Giants (1915–1917, 1919–1920); Lincoln Giants (1918)

Lorenza Samuel Nathaniel Cobb (February 10, 1888 – January 21, 1953) was an American professional baseball catcher in the Negro leagues. He played from 1914 to 1920, playing mostly with the St. Louis Giants. After his playing career, he became secretary of the Negro National League. He served in the 804th Pioneer Infantry during World War I.
