= George Brown (1910s outfielder) =

- Outfielder
- Born: October 24, 1885; Aurora, Illinois, U.S.
- Died: September 16, 1955 (aged 69); Dayton, Ohio, U.S.
- Batted: Unknown Threw: Right

debut
- 1909, for the West Baden Sprudels

Last appearance
- 1921, for the Detroit Stars
- Stats at Baseball Reference

Teams
- West Baden Sprudels (1909–1915); Indianapolis ABCs (1914, 1916); St. Louis Giants (1917); Dayton Marcos (1918–1920); Columbus Buckeyes (1921); Cleveland Tate Stars (1921); Detroit Stars (1921)

George W. Brown (October 24, 1885 – September 16, 1955) was an American Negro leagues outfielder for several years before the founding of the first Negro National League, and in its first two seasons.
