= Salvador Poree =

American baseball player (1903–1979)

- Pitcher
- Born: February 21, 1903; New Orleans, Louisiana, U.S.
- Died: January, 1979; Roselle, Illinois, U.S.
- Batted: Unknown Threw: Unknown

Negro league baseball debut
- 1921, for the St. Louis Giants

Last appearance
- 1921, for the St. Louis Giants

Teams
- St. Louis Giants (1921)

Salvador Joseph Poree (February 21, 1903 - January 1979) was an American professional baseball pitcher in the Negro leagues. He played with the St. Louis Giants in 1921. He is also listed as Porsee in some sources.
