= Candy Jim Taylor =

American baseball player (1884–1948)

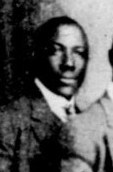
- Third baseman / Manager
- Born: February 1, 1884; Anderson, South Carolina, U.S.
- Died: April 3, 1948 (aged 64); Chicago, Illinois, U.S. buried: Burr Oak Cemetery
- Batted: Right Threw: Right

Career statistics
- Managerial record: 955–991–21
- Winning percentage: .491
- Batting average: .297
- Home runs: 26
- Managerial record at Baseball Reference

Teams
- Birmingham Giants (1904–1909); Leland Giants (1909); St. Paul Colored Gophers (1909–1910); Chicago Giants (1910); St. Louis Giants (1911); West Baden Sprudels (1912); Chicago American Giants (1912–1913); Indianapolis ABCs (1914–1919); Louisville White Sox (1915); Royal Poinciana Team (1916); Bowser's ABCs (1916); Dayton Marcos (1919–1921); Cleveland Tate Stars (1922); Toledo Tigers (1923); St. Louis Stars (1923–1929); Cleveland Elites (1926); Detroit Stars (1926); Memphis Red Sox (1930); Indianapolis ABCs/Detroit Stars (1931–1933); Richmond All-Stars (1933); Nashville Elite Giants (1933–1934); Columbus Elite Giants (1935); Washington Elite Giants (1936); Chicago American Giants (1937–1939); Birmingham Black Barons (1940); Chicago American Giants (1941–1942); Homestead Grays (1943–1944); Chicago American Giants (1945–1947); Baltimore Elite Giants (1948)

Career highlights and awards
- 2x Negro World Series champion (1943, 1944); Negro National League pennant (1928)

James Allen "Candy Jim" Taylor (February 1, 1884 – April 3, 1948) was an American third baseman and manager in Negro league baseball. In a career that spanned forty years, he played as an infielder in the early years of the 20th century for over a dozen black baseball teams; by the mid-1920s, he would play less regularly (doing so as a pinch hitter), with his final game came at 58. In 1920, the same year of the start of the golden era of Negro league baseball, he would take on the responsibilities of manager, where he would manage 1,967 games for twelve teams. Described as one of the great strategists of his era, Taylor is the all-time winningest manager in the Negro league era, having 955 wins along with two Negro World Series titles and one additional pennant in 27 seasons as manager. He has the most seasons managed by an African American manager along with having the seventh most for a manager in the history of baseball.

== Biography ==
Born in Anderson, South Carolina, Taylor was one of four brothers who played in the Negro leagues, along with Ben, C. I. and "Steel Arm" Johnny.

Taylor began playing ball with an amateur club in Anderson, South Carolina in 1901, starting as a catcher.

He played with several different clubs in 1902 and 1903, finally landing a position with the Birmingham Giants in 1904 where he played third base. That year, he played in 55 regular season games and only made three errors.

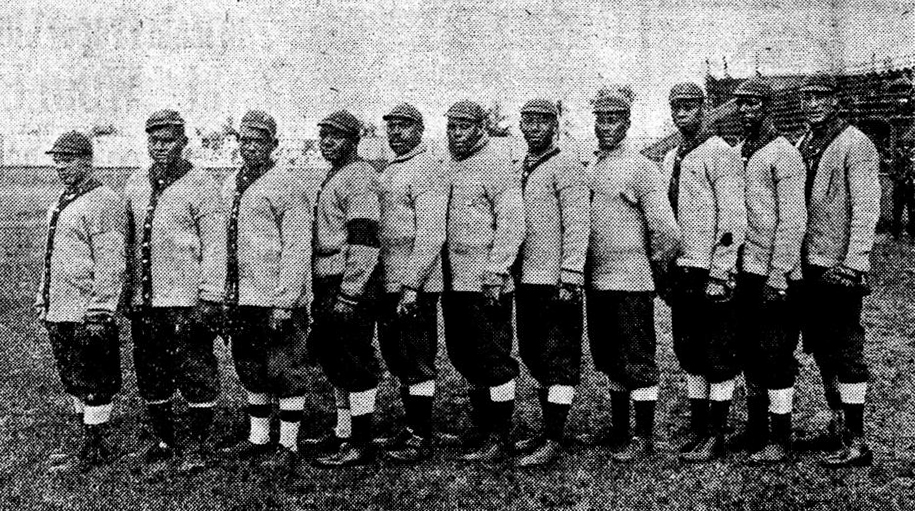
1910 St. Paul Gophers

Taylor continued with Birmingham until 1909, and moved to the St. Paul Colored Gophers for part of a season in 1910. He was named the captain of the team. Later in 1910, he was asked to play for the Chicago Giants, but played instead for the West Baden Sprudels as a player/manager until 1913.

In 1914, he moved to the Indianapolis ABC's as a player/manager, and by 1916, he helped the Indianapolis ABC's to win the Black World Championship. During the War, Taylor seemed to rotate between three teams, the Indianapolis ABCs, Dayton Marcos, and the Detroit Stars.

In 1918, 34 year-old Taylor registered for the WWI Draft. He lists his current occupation as a "Laborer" for the Penn Freight House at Dela and Georgia Street in Indianapolis, Indiana. Taylor lists his current address as 645 Blackford Street in Indianapolis. He does not list any dependents and lists his closest relative as Charles Isaac Taylor at 446 Indiana Avenue.

When the newly formed Negro National League started in 1920, Candy Jim worked as a player-manager for the Dayton Marcos. But he moved on to the Cleveland Tate Stars in the next season. He also served as a vice chairman for the league during its tenure (his brother C.I. also served as one of the co-founders of the league and vice president).

A disciplinarian and a master strategist, as manager Taylor led the St. Louis Stars to contention in the Negro National League, which coincided with the decision to match first half and second half champions for a Championship Series, starting in 1925 (his third and final season in his first stint). That year, his team won the second half of the season and won the right to be matched against the Kansas City Monarchs. They lost that series four to three. Taylor returned in 1927 to St. Louis and managed them to their first championship in 1928, doing so over the Chicago American Giants five games to four in the Championship Series.

The Great Depression took its toll on the economics of the game, and while managing the 1933 Richmond All-Stars, Taylor was forced to sell the team bus, and later had to send the players home.

In 1943 Taylor took over as manager for the Homestead Grays, which had been led by player-manager Vic Harris. After having won the NNL title for the previous three seasons, the Grays were tasked to try and win it again for the right to advance to the newly created second incarnation of the Negro World Series title. They succeeded in winning the pennant and the World Series, for which they would repeat their success again the following year. Taylor managed in baseball until his death, which involved another stint as manager of the Chicago American Giants from 1945 to 1947. In 27 seasons, he managed eleven teams to a winning record, which saw him win three pennants and finish in second four times. He went 17–17 in postseason games.

== Death and legacy ==
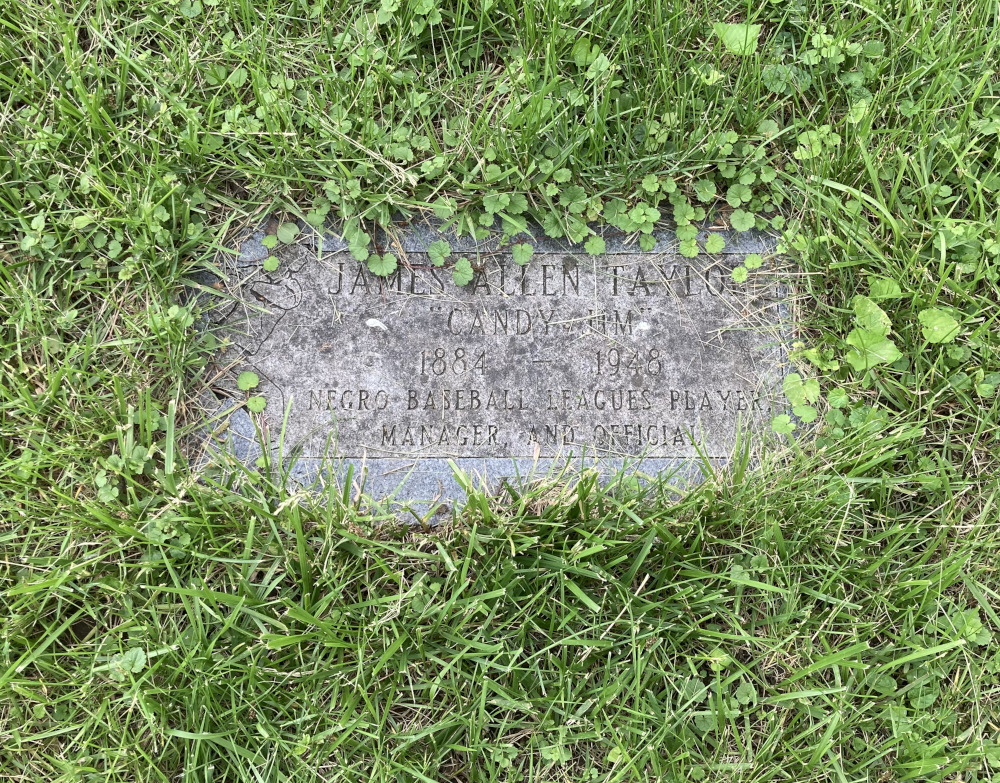
Taylor's grave at Burr Oak Cemetery

Taylor died at age 64 of a heart attack in Chicago and was interred in the Burr Oak Cemetery, Alsip, Illinois. He was buried in an unmarked grave which remained that way for nearly 54 years, until the Negro Leagues Baseball Grave Marker Project raised funds for a proper headstone in 2004.

Taylor managed a variety of black baseball legends in four decades that ranged from Cool Papa Bell to Josh Gibson to Vic Harris while being selected to coach in the East-West All Star Game four times. He has the most wins for all managers in the Negro League era.

== Managerial record ==
| Team | Year | Regular season | | | | | Postseason | | | |
| Team | Year | Games | Won | Lost | Win % | Finish | Won | Lost | Win % | Result |
|---|---|---|---|---|---|---|---|---|---|---|
| DAY | 1920 | 52 | 16 | 36 | .308 | 7th in NNL | – | – | – | – |
| CLE | 1922 | 62 | 25 | 35 | .417 | 7th in NNL | – | – | – | – |
| TOL | 1923 | 14 | 7 | 7 | .500 | 8th in NNL (interim) | – | – | – | – |
| STL | 1923 | 41 | 15 | 25 | .375 | 10th in NNL (interim) | – | – | – | – |
| STL | 1924 | 84 | 43 | 41 | .512 | 4th in NNL | – | – | – | – |
| STL | 1925 | 91 | 59 | 30 | .663 | 2nd in NNL | 3 | 4 | .429 | Lost Championship Series (KC) |
| CLE | 1926 | 48 | 7 | 40 | .149 | 8th in NNL | – | – | – | – |
| DET | 1926 | 21 | 8 | 13 | .381 | 4th in NNL | – | – | – | – |
| STL | 1927 | 99 | 62 | 37 | .626 | 2nd in NNL | – | – | – | – |
| STL | 1928 | 93 | 67 | 26 | .720 | 1st in NNL | 5 | 4 | .556 | Won Championship Series (CHI) |
| STL | 1929 | 107 | 63 | 42 | .600 | 2nd in NNL | – | – | – | – |
| MEM | 1930 | 86 | 30 | 55 | .353 | 8th in NNL | – | – | – | – |
| IND | 1931 | 67 | 32 | 34 | .485 | 3rd in NNL | – | – | – | – |
| IND | 1932 | 61 | 25 | 32 | .439 | 8th in NSL | – | – | – | – |
| IND | 1933 | 48 | 17 | 31 | .354 | 9th in NNL 2 | – | – | – | – |
| NEG | 1934 | 55 | 22 | 32 | .407 | 6th in NNL 2 | – | – | – | – |
| CEG | 1935 | 57 | 30 | 25 | .545 | 4th in NNL 2 | – | – | – | – |
| WEG | 1936 | 65 | 30 | 34 | .469 | 6th in NNL 2 | – | – | – | – |
| CHI | 1937 | 77 | 39 | 37 | .513 | 3rd in NAL | – | – | – | – |
| CHI | 1938 | 82 | 40 | 39 | .506 | 3rd in NAL | – | – | – | – |
| CHI | 1939 | 75 | 39 | 36 | .520 | 2nd in NAL | – | – | – | – |
| BIR | 1940 | 36 | 12 | 24 | .333 | 6th in NAL | – | – | – | – |
| CHI | 1941 | 37 | 13 | 22 | .371 | 6th in NAL | – | – | – | – |
| CHI | 1942 | 43 | 7 | 36 | .163 | 6th in NAL | – | – | – | – |
| WSH | 1943 | 102 | 78 | 23 | .772 | 1st in NNL 2 | 4 | 1 | .571 | Won Negro World Series (BIR) |
| WSH | 1944 | 85 | 63 | 29 | .685 | 1st in NNL 2 | 4 | 3 | .800 | Won Negro World Series (BIR) |
| CHI | 1945 | 101 | 47 | 53 | .470 | 4th in NAL | – | – | – | – |
| CHI | 1946 | 89 | 31 | 56 | .356 | 6th in NAL | – | – | – | – |
| CHI | 1947 | 89 | 28 | 61 | .315 | 6th in NAL | – | – | – | – |
| Total | | 1,967 (Note: Taylor also managed in 21 games that ended in ties) | 955 | 991 | .491 | | 17 | 17 | .500 | |
