= Morten Clark =

- Shortstop
- Born: December 19, 1889; Bristol, Tennessee, U.S.
- Died: November 17, 1943 (aged 53); Los Angeles, California, U.S.
- Batted: Left Threw: Left

debut
- 1908, for the Birmingham Giants

Last appearance
- 1923, for the Baltimore Black Sox
- Stats at Baseball Reference

Teams
- Birmingham Giants (1908); West Baden Sprudels (1910, 1912–1913); Philadelphia Giants (1911); Schenectady Mohawk Giants (1914); Brooklyn Royal Giants (1914); New York Lincoln Stars (1914–1915); Indianapolis ABCs (1915–1922); Lincoln Giants (1919, 1921); Washington Potomacs (1923); Baltimore Black Sox (1923)

Morten Avery "Specs" Clark (December 19, 1889 – November 17, 1943) was an American professional baseball shortstop in the pre-Negro leagues.

He was born December 19, 1889, in Bristol, Tennessee, and played professional baseball for the Birmingham Giants in 1908. He would play a large part of his career for the Indianapolis ABCs.

Clark died in Los Angeles on November 17, 1943, and is buried at the National Cemetery in Los Angeles, California. His World War I draft registration card showed him single, as of 1917.

Almost a decade after his death, Clark received votes listing him on the 1952 Pittsburgh Courier player-voted poll of the Negro Leagues' best players ever. (Some papers have him listed as "Martin" Clark.)
