= Frank Casey =

American baseball player

- Pitcher
- Threw: Left

Negro league baseball debut
- 1915, for the West Baden Sprudels

Last appearance
- 1915, for the West Baden Sprudels

Teams
- West Baden Sprudels (1915)

Frank Casey was an American Negro league pitcher in the 1910s.

Casey played for the West Baden Sprudels in 1915. In six recorded appearances on the mound, he posted a 3.30 ERA over 46.1 innings.
