= Mose Herring =

American baseball player

- Third baseman
- Born: August 24, 1895; Abbeville, South Carolina, U.S.
- Died: January 12, 1931 (aged 35); St. Louis, Missouri, U.S.
- Batted: Left Threw: Right

Negro league baseball debut
- 1920, for the St. Louis Giants

Last appearance
- 1920, for the St. Louis Giants
- Stats at Baseball Reference

Teams
- St. Louis Giants (1920)

Moses L. Herring (August 24, 1895 – January 12, 1931) was an American professional baseball third baseman in the Negro leagues. He played with the St. Louis Giants in 1920.
