= Carl Rolling =

American baseball player

- Outfielder
- Born: September 25, 1893; Springfield, Missouri, U.S.
- Died: November 8, 1954 (aged 61); Kansas City, Missouri, U.S.

Negro league baseball debut
- 1920, for the St. Louis Giants

Last appearance
- 1920, for the St. Louis Giants

Teams
- St. Louis Giants (1920)

Carl E. Rolling (September 25, 1893 – November 8, 1954) was an American Negro league outfielder in the 1920s.

A native of Springfield, Missouri, Rolling played for the St. Louis Giants in 1920. He died in Kansas City, Missouri in 1954 at age 61.
