= Lee Hill (baseball) =

American baseball player

- Infielder
- Born: 1895; Virginia, U.S.
- Threw: Right

Negro league baseball debut
- 1915, for the West Baden Sprudels

Last appearance
- 1920, for the St. Louis Giants
- Stats at Baseball Reference

Teams
- West Baden Sprudels (1915); Dayton Marcos (1919); St. Louis Giants (1920)

Lee Hill (1895 – death unknown) was an American Negro league infielder between 1915 and 1920.

A native of Virginia, Hill made his Negro leagues debut in 1915 with the West Baden Sprudels. He went on to play for the Dayton Marcos and St. Louis Giants.
