= Andrew Reed (baseball) =

American baseball player

- Third baseman

Negro league baseball debut
- 1919, for the Detroit Stars

Last appearance
- 1919, for the St. Louis Giants

Teams
- Detroit Stars (1919); St. Louis Giants (1919)

Andrew Reed was an American Negro league third baseman in the 1910s.

Reed played for the Detroit Stars and the St. Louis Giants in 1919. In three recorded games, he posted three hits in 12 plate appearances.
