= Bennie Lyons =

American baseball player (1882–??)

- First baseman
- Born: April 1, 1882; Indianapolis, Indiana, U.S.

Negro leagues debut
- 1911, for the West Baden Sprudels

Last Negro leagues appearance
- 1913, for the Indianapolis ABCs

Teams
- West Baden Sprudels (1911); French Lick Plutos (1912); Indianapolis ABCs (1912–1913)

Benjamin Jester Lyons (April 1, 1882 – death date unknown) was an American Negro league first baseman in the 1910s.

A native of Indianapolis, Indiana, Lyons was the brother of fellow Negro leaguer Jimmie Lyons. Older brother Bennie made his Negro leagues debut in 1911 with the West Baden Sprudels. He went on to play for the French Lick Plutos and Indianapolis ABCs in 1912 and 1913.
