= Dan Kennard =

- Catcher
- Born: September 3, 1883; Unknown
- Died: May 21, 1947 (aged 63); St. Louis, Missouri, U.S.
- Batted: Right Threw: Right

debut
- 1913, for the French Lick Plutos

Last appearance
- 1925, for the Detroit Stars

Teams
- French Lick Plutos (1913–1914); West Baden Sprudels (1914–1915); Chicago American Giants (1914); Indianapolis ABCs (1915–1916); Chicago Black Sox (1915); St. Louis Giants (1916, 1919–1921); St. Louis Stars (1922–1923); St. Louis Giants (1924); Detroit Stars (1925)

Daniel Kennard (September 3, 1883 – May 21, 1947) was an American Negro leagues catcher for several years before the founding of the first Negro National League, and in its first few seasons.

On July 28, 1915, 31 year-old Kennard moved from the West Baden Sprudels to become the catcher for the Indianapolis ABCs. He started his first game for the A.B.C.s by pitching.

Kennard died at the age of 63 in St. Louis, Missouri and is buried at St. Peter's Cemetery in Hillsdale, MO.
