= Ewell Thomas =

Professional baseball player

- Infielder
- Batted: Right Threw: Right

Negro league baseball debut
- 1922, for the Kansas City Monarchs

Last appearance
- 1924, for the St. Louis Stars

Teams
- Kansas City Monarchs (1922); St. Louis Stars (1923–1924)

Ewell Thomas was a Negro league infielder in the 1920s.

Thomas made his Negro leagues debut in 1922 with the Kansas City Monarchs. He went on to play for the St. Louis Stars in 1923 and 1924, his final professional season.
