= Jack Sutton (baseball) =

American baseball player

- Third baseman

Negro league baseball debut
- 1911, for the West Baden Sprudels

Last appearance
- 1911, for the West Baden Sprudels

Teams
- West Baden Sprudels (1911)

Jack Sutton was an American Negro League third baseman in the 1910s.

Sutton played for the West Baden Sprudels in 1911. In three recorded games, he posted one hit in ten plate appearances.
