= John Meredith (baseball) =

American baseball player

- Third baseman

Negro league baseball debut
- 1914, for the West Baden Sprudels

Last appearance
- 1914, for the West Baden Sprudels

Teams
- West Baden Sprudels (1914)

John Meredith was an American Negro league third baseman in the 1910s.

Meredith played for the West Baden Sprudels in 1914. In three recorded games, he posted five hits in 14 plate appearances.
