= Joe Smith (1910s pitcher) =

American baseball player

- Pitcher
- Threw: Right

Negro league baseball debut
- 1913, for the St. Louis Giants

Last appearance
- 1915, for the St. Louis Giants

Teams
- St. Louis Giants (1913, 1915)

Joe Smith was an American Negro league pitcher in the 1910s.

Smith played for the St. Louis Giants in 1913 and again in 1915. In five recorded career appearances on the mound, Smith posted a 4.03 ERA over 38 innings.
