= Hub Miller =

- Pitcher
- Born: March 24, 1888; Bethpage, Tennessee, U.S.
- Batted: Unknown Threw: Unknown

debut
- 1912, for the West Baden Sprudels

Last appearance
- 1916, for the St. Louis Giants

Teams
- West Baden Sprudels (1912–1915); St. Louis Giants (1915–1916)

Pleas C. "Hub" Miller (born March 24, 1888) was an American Negro leagues pitcher for several years before the founding of the first Negro National League. He pitched for the West Baden Sprudels where papers called him "Spitball Miller" and he pitched for the St. Louis Giants.
