= Bingo Bingham =

- Outfielder
- Born: April 16, 1885; Unknown
- Batted: Unknown Threw: Unknown

Negro leagues debut
- 1909, for the West Baden Sprudels

Last Negro leagues appearance
- 1921, for the Chicago Giants

Negro leagues (Note: On December 16, 2020, Major League Baseball declared certain Negro leagues, from the span of 1920–1948, to be "major" leagues. Bingham's statistics reflect his time in the Negro leagues durning the 1921 season.) statistics
- Batting average: .152
- Hits: 5
- Runs batted in: 2
- Stats at Baseball Reference

Teams
- Birmingham Giants (1909); West Baden Sprudels (1909–1913); French Lick Plutos (1914); Chicago Union Giants (1914, 1916–1917, 1919); Chicago Giants (1921)

William Horace "Bingo" Bingham (born April 16, 1885) was an American professional baseball player. He was a Negro leagues outfielder for several years before the founding of the first Negro National League, and in its first couple seasons.
