= Ed Harrison (baseball) =

American baseball player

- Infielder

Negro league baseball debut
- 1914, for the West Baden Sprudels

Last appearance
- 1919, for the Jewell's ABCs

Teams
- West Baden Sprudels (1914–1915); Bowser's ABCs (1916); Jewell's ABCs (1919)

Ed Harrison was an American Negro league infielder in the 1910s.

Harrison played for the West Baden Sprudels in 1914 and 1915. In 20 recorded games for the Sprudels, he posted nine hits and five RBI in 76 plate appearances. He also played for Bowser's ABCs and Jewell's ABCs.
