= Doc Zeigler =

American baseball player

- Outfielder
- Born: June 30, 1896; Thomaston, Georgia
- Died: August 6, 1989 (aged 93); Chicago, Illinois

Negro league baseball debut
- 1914, for the West Baden Sprudels

Last appearance
- 1914, for the West Baden Sprudels

Teams
- West Baden Sprudels (1914)

William James "Doc" Zeigler (June 30, 1896 – August 6, 1989) was an American Negro league outfielder in the 1910s.

A native of Thomaston, Georgia, Zeigler played for the West Baden Sprudels in 1914. He died in Chicago, Illinois in 1989 at age 93.
