= Jimmie Lyons =

- Pitcher / Utility / Manager
- Born: October 9, 1889; Indianapolis, Indiana, U.S.
- Died: February 8, 1961 (aged 71); Chicago, Illinois, U.S.
- Batted: Left Threw: Left

Negro leagues debut
- 1909, for the Chicago Leland Giants

Last Negro leagues appearance
- 1932, for the Chicago American Giants

Negro leagues (Note: On December 16, 2020, Major League Baseball declared certain Negro leagues, from the span of 1920–1948, to be "major" leagues. Lyons' statistics reflect his time in the Negro leagues from 1920 until the end of his career.) statistics
- Batting average: .301
- Home runs: 16
- Runs batted in: 145
- Win–loss record: 1–2
- Earned run average: 3.49
- Strikeouts: 12
- Managerial record: 0–8

Teams
- Chicago Leland Giants (1909); St. Louis Giants (1910–1912); New York Lincoln Giants (1911); Brooklyn Royal Giants (1914); Chicago Giants (1914, 1917); St. Louis Giants (1915–1917); Indianapolis ABCs (1915–1918); Bowser's ABCs (1916); Jewell's ABCs (1917); St. Louis Giants (1919); Detroit Stars (1920); Atlantic City Bacharach Giants (1920); Chicago American Giants (1921–1925); Washington Potomacs (1924); Cleveland Browns (1924); Louisville Black Caps (1932); Chicago American Giants (1932)

James Henry Lyons (October 9, 1889 – February 8, 1961) was an American professional baseball player in the Negro leagues. He pitched and played outfield between 1910 and 1925. He played for the Brooklyn Royal Giants, Chicago Giants, Lincoln Giants, St. Louis Giants, and Detroit Stars. He is the brother of Bennie Lyons, another baseball player who played for the West Baden Sprudels and Indianapolis ABCs.

When the Negro National League formed in 1920, Lyons signed himself to the Detroit Stars. He played there for one year, then went back to play for the Chicago American Giants.

While many baseball researchers list Lyons as a right-handed hitter or even a right-handed thrower, most newspaper accounts show he was a southpaw.

Lyons served in the military during World War I.

== Death ==
Lyons died in Chicago on February 8, 1961.
