= George Shively =

American baseball player (1893–1962)

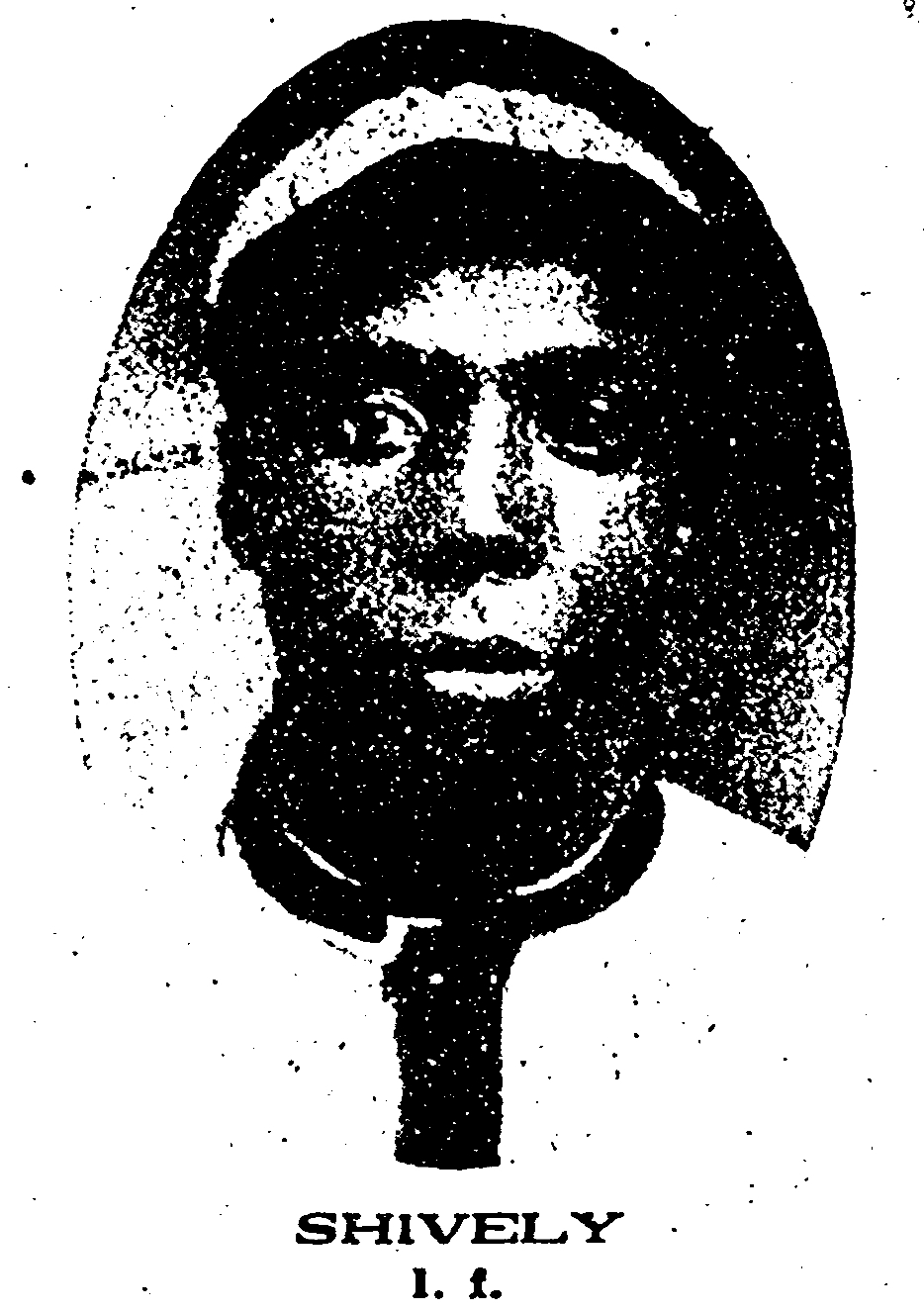
- Left fielder
- Born: January 3, 1893; Lebanon, Kentucky, U.S.
- Died: June 7, 1962 (aged 69); Bloomington, Indiana, U.S.
- Batted: Left Threw: Left

Negro league baseball debut
- 1910, for the West Baden Sprudels

Last appearance
- 1924, for the Washington Potomacs

Teams
- Leland Giants (1911); West Baden Sprudels (1911–1913); Indianapolis ABCs (1914–1918, 1920–1921, 1923); Kokomo, Indiana Black Devils (1919); Atlantic City Bacharach Giants (1919–1922, 1924–1925); Brooklyn Royal Giants (1924); Washington Potomacs (1924)

George "Rabbit" Shively (January 3, 1893 – June 7, 1962) was an American professional baseball left fielder in the Negro leagues. He played from 1910 to 1924 with various teams. He played mostly with the Indianapolis ABCs.

He was asked to leave the Indianapolis ABCs to Captain the "Lyon's Black Devils" baseball team of Kokomo, Indiana for part of the 1919 season, then later that year left for the East Coast where he appears to have played the rest of his career.

Shively died in 1962 and was buried in an unmarked grave in Bloomington, Indiana. A limestone monument was dedicated on his gravesite in the Rosehill Cemetery on April 4, 2015, in a community ceremony memorializing Shively and 10 other African Americans also buried in unmarked graves.
