= Archie Stewart =

American baseball player

- Pitcher
- Batted: Right Threw: Right

Negro league baseball debut
- 1923, for the St. Louis Stars

Last appearance
- 1923, for the St. Louis Stars
- Stats at Baseball Reference

Teams
- St. Louis Stars (1923)

Archie Stewart, nicknamed "Tank", was an American Negro league pitcher in the 1920s.

Stewart played for the St. Louis Stars in 1923. In 26 recorded games on the mound, he posted a 5–6 record with a 5.16 ERA over 118.2 innings.
