= Lawrence Simpson =

- Pitcher
- Born: August 13, 1890; Cumberland, Ohio, U.S.
- Died: June 25, 1921 (aged 30); Fort Bayard, New Mexico, U.S.
- Batted: Unknown Threw: Unknown

debut
- 1913, for the West Baden Sprudels

Last appearance
- 1917, for the Chicago Union Giants

Teams
- West Baden Sprudels (1913–1915); Indianapolis ABCs (1914); Leland Giants (1917)

Lawrence Simpson (August 13, 1890 – June 25, 1921) was an American Negro leagues pitcher for several years before the founding of the first Negro National League. He pitched for the West Baden Sprudels, the Indianapolis ABCs, and the Chicago Union Giants.

Simpson attended Wilberforce University in Wilberforce, Ohio.

He died in 1921 and is buried in Lincoln Cemetery in Blue Island, Illinois.
