= George Womack =

American baseball player (1898-1928)

- Catcher
- Born: April 27, 1898; Tennessee, U.S.
- Died: June 7, 1928 (aged 30); St. Louis, Missouri, U.S.

Negro league baseball debut
- 1924, for the St. Louis Stars

Last appearance
- 1924, for the St. Louis Stars

Teams
- St. Louis Stars (1924)

George Edmund Womack (April 27, 1898 – June 7, 1928) was an American Negro league catcher in the 1920s.

A native of Tennessee, Womack played for the St. Louis Stars in 1924. He died in St. Louis, Missouri in 1928 at age 30.
