= Noble Wilson =

American baseball player

- Outfielder
- Threw: Left

Negro league baseball debut
- 1918, for the Dayton Marcos

Last appearance
- 1919, for the St. Louis Giants

Teams
- Dayton Marcos (1918); St. Louis Giants (1919)

Noble Wilson was an American Negro league outfielder in the 1910s.

Wilson made his Negro leagues debut in 1918 with the Dayton Marcos. He went on to play for the St. Louis Giants the following season.
