= Arthur Jones (baseball) =

American baseball player

- Infielder

Negro league baseball debut
- 1925, for the Birmingham Black Barons

Last appearance
- 1926, for the St. Louis Stars

Teams
- Birmingham Black Barons (1925); St. Louis Stars (1926)

Arthur Brown Jones was an American Negro league infielder in the 1920s.

Jones played for the Birmingham Black Barons in 1925, and for the St. Louis Stars the following season. In six recorded career games, he posted one hit in seven plate appearances.
