= Jerome Lewis =

American baseball player

- Infielder
- Born: January 14, 1890; Memphis, Tennessee, U.S.
- Died: October 25, 1962 (aged 72); French Lick, Indiana, U.S.
- Threw: Right

Negro league baseball debut
- 1910, for the West Baden Sprudels

Last appearance
- 1913, for the Leland Giants

Teams
- West Baden Sprudels (1910–1913); Leland Giants (1913)

Jerome Ambrose Lewis (January 14, 1890 – October 25, 1962) was an American Negro league infielder who played in the 1910s.

A native of Memphis, Tennessee, Lewis attended Talladega College. He made his Negro leagues debut in 1910 with the West Baden Sprudels. He went on to play four seasons with the Sprudels, and also played for the Leland Giants in 1913. Lewis died in French Lick, Indiana in 1962 at age 72.
