= Dewey Creacy =

American baseball player

- Third baseman
- Born: April 13, 1899; Fort Worth, Texas, U.S.
- Died: November 17, 1984 (aged 85); Los Angeles, California, U.S.
- Batted: Right Threw: Right

Negro league baseball debut
- 1924, for the St. Louis Stars

Last appearance
- 1938, for the Philadelphia Stars
- Stats at Baseball Reference

Teams
- St. Louis Stars (1924–1931); Washington Pilots (1932); Detroit Wolves (1932); Columbus Blue Birds (1933); Cleveland Giants (1933); Philadelphia Stars (1934–1938)

Albert Dewey Creacy (April 13, 1899 – November 17, 1984) was an American Negro league third baseman in the 1920s and 1930s.

A native of Fort Worth, Texas, Creacy made his Negro leagues debut in 1924 with the St. Louis Stars. He knocked a home run for St. Louis in both the team's 1925 Negro National League championship series loss, and in the team's 1928 championship series victory, and was a mainstay with the club through the 1931 season. After bouncing around with several teams in 1932 and 1933, Creacy caught on with the Philadelphia Stars in 1934, and remained in Philadelphia for five seasons to finish his career. He died in Los Angeles, California in 1984 at age 85.
