= West Baden Sprudels =

Negro League Baseball team (1910–1915)

Information
- League: Independent
- Location: French Lick Township, Indiana
- Established: c.1907/8
- Disbanded: late 1910s

The West Baden Sprudels were an early Negro league baseball team that played as an independent club owned by the Burnett-Pollard-Rogers Baseball Club Company, where Edward Rogers was the Chief Officer.

== Founding ==
The Sprudels appear to have been from Springs Valley, Indiana, but they often frequented baseball diamonds near the West Baden Springs Hotel in West Baden Springs, Indiana, and the French Lick Springs Hotel in French Lick, Indiana. Games started between the teams between 1907 and 1908. The team was managed by C. I. Taylor from 1910 to 1913.

Their name derived from a bottled water produced at the Hotel. The hotel bordered on a local salt lick and mineral spring and the minerals from the spring made the water act as an effective and marketable natural laxative. The product was labeled as "Sprudel Water" (from German "Sprudelwasser" meaning "sparkling water"). Their frequent rivals, the French Lick Plutos, came from a hotel on the same spring that had also bottled the water and sold it as "Pluto Water".

== Competition ==
The West Baden Sprudels played long before the Negro National League formed in 1920, but still against many of the great pre-Negro league baseball teams of the day, including the Chicago American Giants, Indianapolis ABCs, Cuban Stars, Louisville White Sox, Chicago Union Giants, Chicago Giants, French Lick Plutos, and the Brooklyn All Stars.

== Rosters ==
=== 1910 ===
- Bingo Bingham
- George Brown
- Carson
- Morten Clark
- Tick Houston
- Jerome Lewis
- Eugene Moore
- Luther O'Neal
- Ben Taylor
- C. I. Taylor
- Steel Arm Johnny Taylor
- Doc Wiley
- String Bean Williams

=== 1911 ===
- Bingo Bingham
- Dizzy Dismukes
- Ellis
- Jerome Lewis
- Bennie Lyons
- Hub Miller
- Luther O'Neal
- George Shively
- Jack Sutton
- C. I. Taylor

=== 1912 ===
- Bingo Bingham
- George Brown
- Morten Clark
- Bingo DeMoss
- Jerome Lewis
- Will McMurray
- Hub Miller
- Luther O'Neal
- George Shively
- Ben Taylor
- C. I. Taylor
- Steel Arm Johnny Taylor
- String Bean Williams

=== 1913 ===
- Bingo Bingham
- George Brown
- Morten Clark
- Bruce Hocker
- Bill Kindle
- Jerome Lewis
- Will McMurray
- Hub Miller
- Luther O'Neal
- George Shively
- Lawrence Simpson
- Ben Taylor
- C. I. Taylor
- Steel Arm Johnny Taylor
- String Bean Williams

=== 1914 ===
- George Brown
- Lorenza Cobb
- Bingo DeMoss
- Bunny Downs
- Ed Harrison
- Bruce Hocker
- Alex Jones
- Dan Kennard
- Ted Kimbro
- Lee
- James Lynch
- Will McMurray
- John Meredith
- Hub Miller
- Eugene Moore
- Luther O'Neal
- Lawrence Simpson
- String Bean Williams
- Doc Zeigler

=== 1915 ===
- Charlie Blackwell
- Branch
- Otto Briggs
- George Brown
- Frank Casey
- George Dandy
- Bingo DeMoss
- Bunny Downs
- Gotriel "Oscar" Goines
- John Gillard
- Hainey
- Ed Harrison
- Ernest Hill
- Lee Hill
- Tick Houston
- Chappie Johnson
- Keene
- Dan Kennard
- Ted Kimbro
- Mahoney
- McKinley Downs
- Henry McLaughlin
- Will McMurray
- Hub Miller
- Lawrence Simpson
- Candy Jim Taylor
- Henry Ward
- Jack Watts
- Burlin White
