= Ben Taylor (first baseman, born 1888) =

American baseball player (1888–1953)

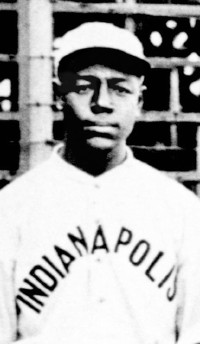
- Taylor in 1915
- First baseman / Manager
- Born: July 1, 1888; Anderson, South Carolina, U.S.
- Died: January 24, 1953 (aged 64); Baltimore, Maryland, U.S.
- Batted: Left Threw: Left

Negro leagues debut
- 1908, for the Birmingham Giants

Last Negro leagues appearance
- 1929, for the Bacharach Giants

Negro leagues (Note: On December 16, 2020, Major League Baseball declared certain Negro leagues, from the span of 1920–1948, to be "Major League". Taylor's statistics reflect his time in the Negro leagues from 1920 to 1929, 1935, and 1938.) statistics
- Batting average: .337
- Home runs: 26
- Runs batted in: 449
- Managerial record: 197–258–11
- Winning %: .433
- Stats at Baseball Reference
- Managerial record at Baseball Reference

Teams
- As player: Birmingham Giants (1908–1909); West Baden Sprudels (1910–1913); St. Louis Giants (1911–1912); New York Lincoln Giants (1912); Chicago American Giants (1913–1914); Indianapolis ABCs (1914–1918, 1920–1922); Jewell's ABCs of Indianapolis (1919); Atlantic City Bacharach Giants (1919, 1929); Washington Potomacs (1923–1924); Harrisburg Giants (1925); Baltimore Black Sox (1926–1928); As manager: Washington Potomacs (1923–1924); Baltimore Black Sox (1926–1928); Washington Pilots (1932); Brooklyn Eagles (1935); Washington Black Senators (1938)

Member of the National

Baseball Hall of Fame
- Induction: 2006
- Election method: Committee on African-American Baseball

Benjamin Harrison Taylor (July 1, 1888 – January 24, 1953) was an American first baseman and manager in baseball's Negro leagues. Taylor played for the Birmingham Giants, Chicago American Giants, Indianapolis ABC's, St. Louis Giants, Bacharach Giants, Washington Potomacs, Harrisburg Giants, and Baltimore Black Sox. His playing career lasted from 1908 to 1929. He was elected to the Baseball Hall of Fame in 2006.

== Early life ==
Taylor was born in Anderson, South Carolina. He was the youngest of four brothers who all became famous in baseball, including C.I., Candy Jim and Johnny "Steel Arm".

== Negro league career ==
Taylor initiated his career as a pitcher for the Birmingham Giants in 1908. After playing for the St. Louis Giants (1911–12), New York Lincoln Giants (1912) and Rube Foster's Chicago American Giants (1913–14), Taylor made his name playing for the team one of his brothers, C.I. Taylor, managed and owned, the Indianapolis ABCs.

Following a 1915 season in which he hit .308, he set Cuba ablaze, hitting .500 in winter league play. He took that hot bat into the 1916 championship season. Ben went 11-for-18 in the World Series, stealing three bases in five games.

Other than a 1919 season split between Hilldale and a managerial stint with the Bacharach Giants, Ben played with the ABCs from 1914 to 1922. In that final season, he replaced C.I. as manager, following his death.

In 1923, Taylor organized the Washington Potomacs, bringing brother Johnny along as pitching coach. The team joined the new Eastern Colored League in its inaugural season the following year.

Ben continued as a player/manager, joining Harrisburg in 1925 and the Baltimore Black Sox from 1926 to 1928. He was then traded to the Bacharach Giants in exchange for their manager Dick Lundy prior to the 1929 campaign, the final season of his playing career. In all but one of his first 16 seasons, Taylor batted over .300. During his career, he was also a manager and excellent teacher of young players. It was from him that Buck Leonard learned to polish and refine his skills as a first baseman. He continued to coach and manage until 1940.

== Later life ==
After retiring, Taylor was an active businessman, operating a poolroom and acquiring the rights to print and sell game programs at Baltimore Elite Giants games. In a 1949 Philadelphia Evening Bulletin article, Oscar Charleston selected Ben Taylor as his first baseman on his all-time All-Star team. In 1952, as the Negro league's decline was in rapid motion, the Pittsburgh Courier polled its readers to name the greatest players of the Negro leagues. They eventually named 5 teams plus honorable mentions. Among those honored, Taylor was awarded 2nd team, first base.

He died at age 64 in Baltimore, Maryland.
