= Charlie Blackwell =

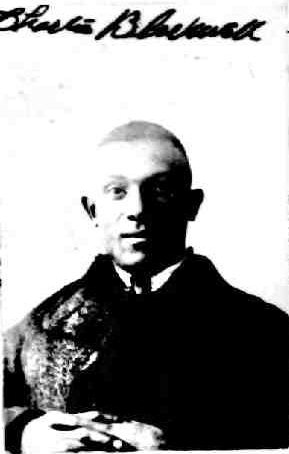
- Outfielder
- Born: December 12, 1894; Brandenburg, Kentucky, US
- Died: April 22, 1935 (aged 40); Proviso, Illinois, US
- Batted: Left Threw: Left

debut
- 1915, for the West Baden Sprudels

Last appearance
- 1929, for the Nashville Elite Giants
- Stats at Baseball Reference

Teams
- West Baden Sprudels (1915); St. Louis Giants/Stars (1916-1917, 1919-1925, 1928); Indianapolis ABCs (1917); St. Louis Giants (1924); Birmingham Black Barons (1925); Detroit Stars (1926); Bacharach Giants (1928); Nashville Elite Giants (1929)

Charles H. "Rucker" Blackwell (December 12, 1894 – April 22, 1935) was an American professional baseball outfielder in the Negro leagues. He played from 1915 to 1929 with several teams, playing mostly with the St. Louis Giants/Stars.
