= French Lick Plutos =

Negro League Baseball team (1912–1914)

Information
- League: Independent
- Location: French Lick, Indiana
- Established: 1912
- Disbanded: 1914

The French Lick Plutos were an early independent Negro league baseball club, which was based in French Lick, Indiana, from 1912 to 1914. They were alternately known as the Red Devils.

== Founding ==
The Plutos were based in French Lick, Indiana, at the French Lick Springs Hotel and frequented the West Baden Springs Hotel in nearby West Baden Springs.

Their name derived from a bottled water produced at the Hotel. The Hotel bordered on a local salt lick and mineral spring and the minerals from the spring made the water act as an effective and marketable natural laxative. The product was branded as "Pluto Water" with an image of a red devil on the label. Their frequent rivals, the West Baden Sprudels, came from a hotel that took water from the very same spring, and sold it as "Sprudel Water".

== Players ==
Throughout their history, the Plutos' roster included players such as Todd Allen, Mule Armstrong, Bingo Bingham, Sam Crow, Dizzy Dismukes, Bingo DeMoss, Henry Hannon, Dan Kennard and Harry Moore, among many others who would go on to become members of the Negro National League.

== Sources ==
- Riley, James A (1994). The Biographical Encyclopedia of the Negro Baseball Leagues. Carroll & Graf. ISBN 0-7867-0959-6
