= Louisville White Sox (1914–1915) =

Negro league baseball team

Information
- League: Western Independent Clubs, 1914-1915
- Location: Louisville, Kentucky
- Established: 1914
- Disbanded: 1915

The Louisville White Sox were a Negro league baseball team in the Western Independent Clubs in 1914 and 1915, based in Louisville, Kentucky. They played their home games at Spring Bank Park in 1914 and 1915 and at Eclipse Park in 1915.

They were of no connection to the later Louisville White Sox of the Negro National League.
