= St. Louis Stars (baseball) =

Negro League baseball team (1906-1931)

Information
- League: Independent (1906–1919); Negro National League (I) (1920–1931)
- Location: St. Louis, Missouri
- Ballpark: Kuebler's Park (1906–1919); Athletic Park (1910–1913); Giants Park (1920–1921); Handlan's Park (1920–1922); Stars Park (1922–1931)
- Established: 1906
- Disbanded: 1931
- Nicknames: St. Louis Giants (1906–1921); St. Louis Stars (1922–1931)
- League titles: 1931; 1930; 1928

The St. Louis Stars, originally the St. Louis Giants, were a Negro league baseball team that competed independently from as early as 1906 to 1919, and then joined the Negro National League (NNL) for the duration of their existence. After the 1921 season, the Giants were sold by African-American promoter Charlie Mills to Dick Kent and Dr. Sam Sheppard, who built a new park and renamed the club the Stars. As the Stars, they eventually built one of the great dynasties in Negro league history, winning three pennants in four years from 1928 to 1931.

== St. Louis Giants ==
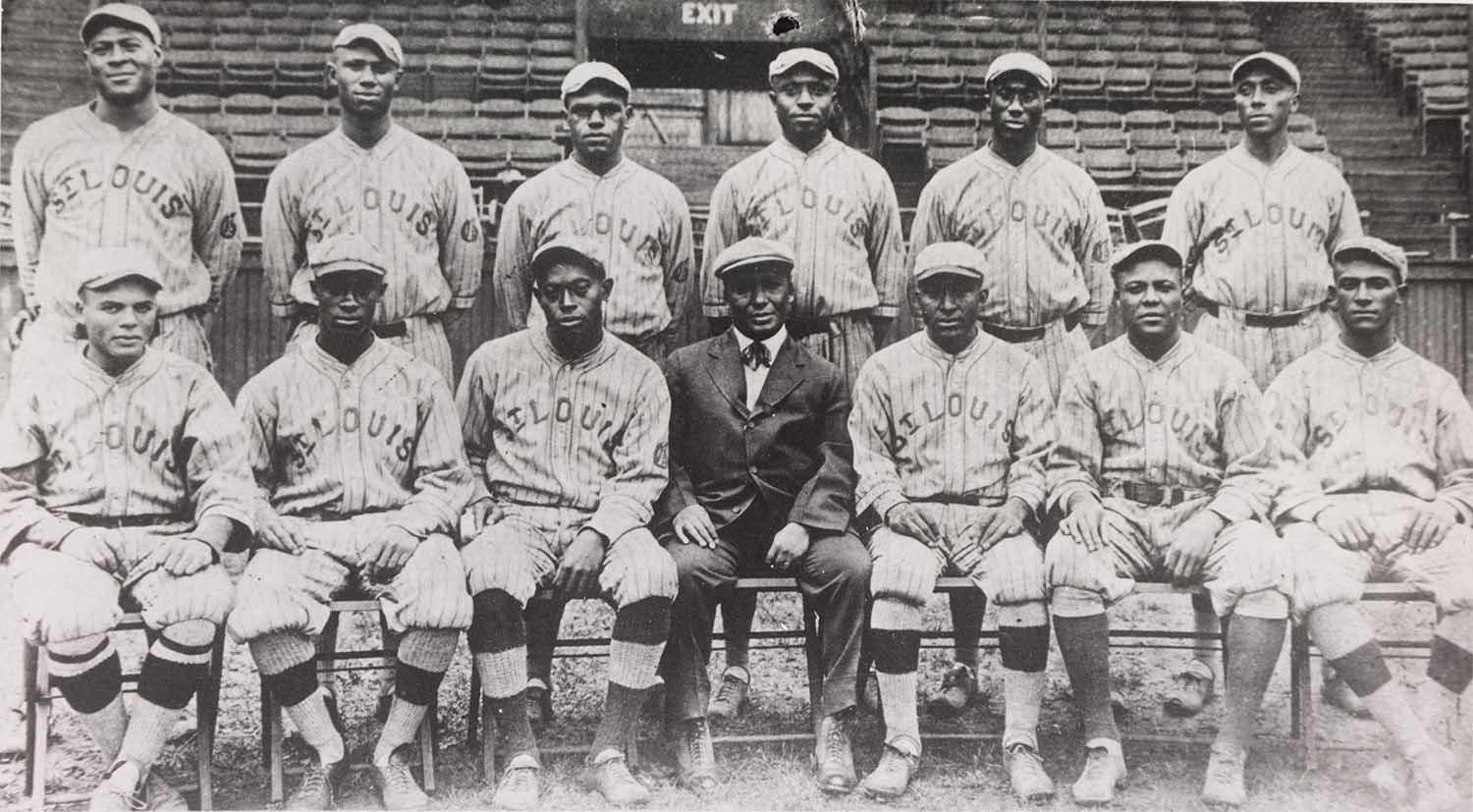
1916 team photo

In 1906, Charles A. Mills, an African-American bank messenger and baseball fan who wanted to upgrade the team, approached Conrad Kuebler, a white man who owned a ballpark, and convinced him to invest in the team. He then persuaded the Leland Giants to visit St. Louis to play against his team. Mills discovered that the Leland Giants' star third baseman, Dick Wallace wanted a change of scenery, and persuaded him to join the St. Louis Giants as the team's playing manager. Wallace stayed with the team for most of its existence and assembled a core of veterans, including Ben Taylor, shortstop Joe Hewitt, first baseman Tullie McAdoo, catcher/outfielder Sam Bennett, pitchers Bill Drake and Bill Gatewood, and outfielders Jimmie Lyons and Charles Blackwell. Though they were a good club, winning the St. Louis City League championship in 1912 and 1913, they couldn't break the grip of the Chicago American Giants and, later, the Indianapolis ABCs on the unofficial western championship of black baseball.

=== Negro National League ===
In 1920, the Giants finished sixth in the eight-team NNL with a 25–32 record. For the next season, St. Louis acquired center fielder Oscar Charleston from Indianapolis. Led by a historic season by Charleston (the latest research shows him batting .436, with 12 home runs and a league-leading 32 stolen bases in 62 games), who was nearly matched by Blackwell (.430), and with Bill Drake contributing 16 wins, the Giants surged to second place with a 40–28 record. In October, they played a best-of-seven series with the second-place St. Louis Cardinals in Sportsman's Park, and lost four games to one, even though Cardinals' star Rogers Hornsby did not participate. That would be both the club's high point and its swan song, as Mills gave up the NNL's St. Louis franchise that winter. In 1922, most of the Giants' roster would play for the new St. Louis Stars.

=== Barnstorming ===
Mills organized new, independent teams using the St. Louis Giants moniker, frequently signing old Giants' players. That team toured the east coast in both 1924 and 1928. An African-American industrial league team used the name in the late 1930s (it was also known as the St. Louis Titanium Giants), counting eventual major leaguer Luke Easter among its players.

== St. Louis Stars ==
The Stars inherited almost the entire roster of the 1921 Giants (who had finished in second place), with the exception of Hall of Fame center fielder Oscar Charleston. Without Charleston, the Stars dropped to fourth place in 1922, though with a creditable 35–26 record. In 1923, they slipped badly, finishing with 28 wins and 44 losses, good for only sixth place. Midway through the year, they acquired several players from the Toledo Tigers when that team folded, including new manager Candy Jim Taylor. A 37-year-old third baseman, Taylor tied for the 1923 league lead with 20 home runs (19 hit while with St. Louis).

In the years that followed, Taylor assembled a roster of some of the most prominent players in Negro league history, including Cool Papa Bell, whom Taylor converted from a left-handed pitcher into a defensive center fielder and leadoff man; Mule Suttles, first baseman known for his powerful hitting ; Willie Wells, considered by many historians to be John Henry Lloyd's only serious rival as greatest shortstop in Negro league history; and pitcher Ted Trent, noted for his curveball.

=== Championship years ===
In 1924, the Stars improved to 42–34 and a fourth-place finish. The next year, they won the second-half title with a 38–12 record after only narrowly losing the first half (69–27 overall) but lost the playoff series to Bullet Rogan and the Kansas City Monarchs. When Taylor left to manage the Detroit Stars and Cleveland Elites in 1926, the Stars slumped to 49–30, good for third place overall, though Mule Suttles enjoyed a historic season at bat. According to John Holway's Complete Book of the Negro Leagues, he hit .498 and led the NNL in doubles (27), triples (21), and home runs (27, the all-time Negro league single-season record). He returned in 1927, and in 1928 the Stars took over the league, winning the first half going away, and compiling the best overall record (66–26). They defeated the Chicago American Giants, second-half winners (and Negro league world champions for two years running) in an exciting playoff series, 5 games to 4.

The Stars continued their winning ways in 1929, but were just edged out in both halves of the season by the Kansas City Monarchs, despite Willie Wells's 27 home runs (tying Suttles's 1926 record). The following year they took their second NNL pennant, defeating the Detroit Stars in the playoff. In 1931, the Stars were awarded the pennant when the league disintegrated partway through the season. The club folded along with the league.

== Home fields ==
The Giants originally played at Giants Park, and occasionally played some games in the 1920s at four nearby parks: Vandeventer Lot II, Easton Street Park, Market Street Park, and Handlan's Park.

After the Giants were re-named the Stars, they continued to use Handlan's Park as their home field until their new ball park was completed. Stars Park, located at the southeast corner of Compton and Laclede avenues (38.632193°N 90.226014°W), was completed in July 1922 and was the primary home baseball park of the Stars from 1922 to 1931. It had a capacity of 10,000 people. It was one of the few ballparks built expressly for the Negro leagues. The park became famous for its 269-foot left field wall, built to accommodate a trolley car barn. Despite special rules that in some seasons counted home runs hit over the car barn as ground-rule doubles, the park proved very friendly to power hitters over the years.

== Hall of Fame players ==
Below are the players for St. Louis that were later inducted into the National Baseball Hall of Fame. After each player's name is his primary position, years played with the Giants/Stars, and year inducted into the Hall of Fame. An asterisk denotes St. Louis as his primary team.

St. Louis Stars Hall of Famers
Inductee	Position	Tenure	Inducted
Cool Papa Bell*	CF	1922–1931	1974
Oscar Charleston	CF	1920–1921	1997
Biz Mackey	C	1920	2006
Mule Suttles	1B	1926–1930	2006
Ben Taylor	P / 1B	1911	2006
Willie Wells*	SS	1924–1931	1997

== MLB throwback jerseys ==
The St. Louis Cardinals have honored the Stars by wearing replica uniforms during regular-season baseball games on several occasions, including July 4, 1997 (at home vs. Pittsburgh), August 1 and 2, 1998 (at Atlanta), June 29, 2003 (at Kansas City), August 12, 2006 (at Pittsburgh), August 14, 2007 (at Washington), July 23, 2011 (at Pittsburgh), September 22, 2020 (at Kansas City), September 9, 2022 (at Pittsburgh), and June 20, 2024 (at Rickwood Field in Birmingham, Alabama).
