= 1932 Detroit Wolves season =

1932 Detroit Wolves
- League: East–West League
- Ballpark: Hamtramck Stadium
- City: Hamtramck, Michigan
- Record: Total: 28–9 (.757) vs. East–West League opponents: 26–5 (.839)
- League place: 1st
- Owners: Cumberland Posey
- Managers: Dizzy Dismukes

The 1932 Detroit Wolves baseball team was a Negro league baseball team that competed in the East–West League (EWL) during the 1932 baseball season. The team compiled a 28–9 (.757) record (26–5 (.839) against EWL opponents) and won the EWL pennant, finishing six-and-a-half games ahead of the second-place team. The Wolves played their home games at Hamtramck Stadium in Hamtramck, Michigan.

The team included on its roster five players who were later inducted into the Baseball Hall of Fame: center fielder Cool Papa Bell, first baseman Mule Suttles, shortstop Willie "The Devil" Wells, and pitchers Ray Brown and Smokey Joe Williams.

The teams winning percentage (.839) vs. teams in its league is the highest by a team in a season in the Negro Major Leagues.

== Formation and management ==
After the 1931 season, the Negro National League (NNL) disbanded. The Detroit Stars, which had represented the City of Detroit in the NNL since 1920, were also disbanded at that time.

The Detroit Wolves were organized prior to the 1932 season as part of the newly formed East–West League (EWL). Cumberland Posey was a leader behind the formation of the EWL and the owner of the Wolves. Described by one sportswriter as "the smartest man in Negro baseball," he was posthumously inducted into the Baseball Hall of Fame in 2006.

Dizzy Dismukes, an Alabama native and right-handed pitcher, was hired as the team's manager.

In an effort to build a roster, the Wolves signed players from the recently disbanded Negro National League. In particular, the Wolves signed seven players from the 1931 St. Louis Stars team. The former St. Louis players were: Cool Papa Bell; Willie Wells; Mule Suttles; right fielder Quincy Trouppe; third baseman Dewey Creacy; and pitchers Ted Trent and Nate Hunter.

In early June, the Wolves sent Suttles, John Henry Russell, and Creacy to the Homestead Grays in exchange for Giles (first baseman), Allen (second baseman), and Jud Wilson (third baseman).

== Position players ==
The team featured a powerful lineup of batters, scoring an average of 5.5 runs per game against EWL opponents.

Center fielder Cool Papa Bell, a native of Mississippi, ranked second in the league with a .340 batting average and also ranked among the league's leaders with 40 runs scored (fourth) and nine stolen bases (tied for second). Bell was one of the first Negro league players inducted into the Baseball Hall of Fame, receiving the honor in 1974.

First baseman Mule Suttles, an Alabama native, was the team's leading slugger and led the league with 48 RBIs and 22 doubles and ranked second in the league with 30 bases on balls and a .524 slugging percentage. Suttles also led the EWL with 468 putouts. He was inducted into the Baseball Hall of Fame in 2006.

Third baseman Dewey Creacy led the EWL by appearing in 63 games and playing 538 innings. Creacy also led the league's third basemen with 72 putouts and 92 assists.

Shortstop Willie Wells, a Texas native, ranked first among the league's shortstops with 87 putouts and second with 111 assists. Considered one of the best defensive shortstops of his era, Wells was inducted into the Baseball Hall of Fame in 1997.

== Pitchers ==
The Wolves' pitching staff compiled a 2.77 earned run average (ERA) that was the best in the EWL.

Bertrum Hunter, a right-handed pitcher from Arizona, led the league in both wins (10) and strikeouts (72). He appeared in 16 games for the Wolves, 10 as a starter, and compiled a 10–2 record with a 2.93 ERA.

William Bell, a right-handed pitcher from Texas, ranked second in the league with a 2.47 ERA. He compiled a 4–2 win–loss record.

Smokey Joe Williams, another right-hander from Texas, compiled a 5–1 record and a 2.72 ERA. Williams was inducted into the Baseball Hall of Fame in 1999.

Ray Brown compiled a 7–7 record in 16 games with a 3.67 ERA. He went on to fame with the Homestead Grays and was inducted into the Baseball Hall of Fame in 2006.

== Roster ==
The following players participated in games for the 1932 Detroit Wolves.

Name	Image	Position	Height	Weight	Bats/Throws	Place of birth	Year of birth
Cool Papa Bell		CF	5'11"	157	Both/Left	Starkville, Mississippi	1903
William Bell		RF	5'7"	170	Right/Right	Hallettsville, Texas	1897
Ray Brown		LF	6'1"	195	Both/Right	McDonald Township, Ohio	1908
Albert Dewey Creacy		3B	5'9"	160	Right/Right	Fort Worth, Texas	1899
Dizzy Dismukes		P	6'0"	180	Right/Right	Birmingham, Alabama	1890
Vic Harris		LF	5'10"	168	Left/Right	Calhoun, Alabama	1905
Nate Hunter		P	5'9"	175	Right/Right	Phoenix, Arizona	1910
John Henry Russell		2B	5'9"	148	Right/Right	Dolcito, Alabama	1898
Ray Sheppard		2B					
Mule Suttles		1B	6'1"	200	Right/Right	Blocton, Alabama	1901
Ted Trent		P	6'3"	185	Right/Right	Jacksonville, Florida	1903
Quincy Trouppe		RF	6'2"	225	Both/Right	Dublin, Georgia	1912
Willie Wells		SS	5'9"	170	Right/Right	Shawnee, Oklahoma	1904
Smokey Joe Williams		P	6'3"	190	Right/Right	Seguin, Texas	1886
Charles Williams		P	5'6"	165	Left/Left	Tanners, Virginia	1894
Tom Young		C	6'1"	210	Left/Right	Wetumpka, Alabama	1902

== Game log ==
Date	Opponent	Site	Result	Source
April 14	Homestead Grays	Charleston, West Virginia	W 3–2	
April 16	Homestead Grays	Forbes Field, Pittsburgh	W 5-4	
April 24	Baltimore Black Sox	Baltimore	W 4-1	
April 24	Baltimore Black Sox	Baltimore	W 3-1	
April 27	Dayton	Dayton, Ohio	W 9-5	
April 28	Dayton	Dayton, Ohio	W 7-6	
April 29	Fort Wayne	Fort Wayne, Indiana	W 11-5	
April 30	Chicago American Giants	Chicago	W 9-4	
May 1	Chicago American Giants	Chicago	L 3-5	
May 2	Chicago American Giants	Chicago	L 1-2	
May 3	Chicago American Giants	Chicago	W 7-6	
May 7	Cuban Stars	Hamtramck Stadium	L 1-4	
May 8	Cuban Stars	Hamtramck Stadium	W 13-3	
May 8	Cuban Stars	Hamtramck Stadium	L 2-4	
May 9	Cuban Stars	Hamtramck Stadium	Rain	
May 11	Cleveland	Hamtramck Stadium	Rain	
May 13	Homestead Grays	Hamtramck Stadium	W 13-1	
May 14	Homestead Grays	Hamtramck Stadium	W 5-4	
May 16	Homestead Grays	Hamtramck Stadium	W 5-4	
May 16	Homestead Grays	Hamtramck Stadium	L 2-5	
May 17	Cleveland Stars	Cleveland	W 5-0	
May 18	Cleveland Stars	Cleveland	W 3-0	
May 21	Cleveland Stars	Hamtramck Stadium	W 5-2	
May 21	Cleveland Stars	Hamtramck Stadium	W 3-0	
May 22	Hilldale Club	Hamtramck Stadium	W 8-3	
May 22	Hilldale Club	Hamtramck Stadium	W 6-5	
May 27	Washington Pilots	Hamtramck Stadium	W 6-0	
May 29	Washington Pilots	Hamtramck Stadium	W 11-7	
May 29	Washington Pilots	Hamtramck Stadium	W 7-0	
May 30	Washington Pilots	Griffith Stadium, Washington, D.C.	W 5-4	
May 30	Washington Pilots	Griffith Stadium, Washington, D.C.	W 9-4	
May 31	Washington Pilots	Washington, D.C.	W 4-1	
June 2	Hilldale Club	Philadelphia	W 6-5	
June 6	Pittsburgh Crawfords	Island Park, Harrisburg, PA		
June 11	Baltimore Black Sox	Hamtramck Stadium	W 15-3	
June 13	Baltimore Black Sox	Hamtramck Stadium	L 5-9	
June 13	Baltimore Black Sox	Hamtramck Stadium	L 2-8	
June 19	Cuban Stars	Hamtramck Stadium	W 5-2	
June 19	Cuban Stars	Hamtramck Stadium	L 0-2	
July 3	Washington	Hamtramck Stadium	W 16-1	
