= List of Major League Baseball annual wins leaders =

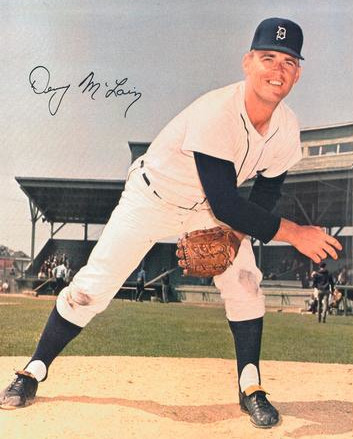
Dennis McLain, 1968 American League wins leader, with 31; this was the last time a pitcher has won thirty.

Major League Baseball recognizes the player or players in each league^{[a]} with the most wins each season.^{[b]} In baseball, wins are a statistic used to evaluate pitchers. Credit for a win is given by the official scorer to the pitcher whose team takes and maintains the lead while he is the pitcher of record. If a game is tied or if the lead changes to the other team, all pitchers who have participated and exited the game to that point are unable to receive credit for the victory. A starting pitcher is ineligible for the win unless he pitches at least five innings; if he doesn't, but nevertheless leaves his team with a lead that it never relinquishes (a rather uncommon combination), the scorer awards the victory to the relief pitcher who was "most effective... in the official scorer's judgment".

== History ==
The National League's first win champion was Albert Spalding, who led the senior circuit with 47 wins after leading the semi-professional National Association in each of its five seasons. Hall of Fame pitcher Cy Young led the American League in wins in each of its first three years (1901–1903), amassing 33, 32, and 28 victories in those seasons for the Boston Americans. Warren Spahn leads all players with 8 win championships in his 21 seasons for the Boston and Milwaukee Braves.

=== Six titles ===
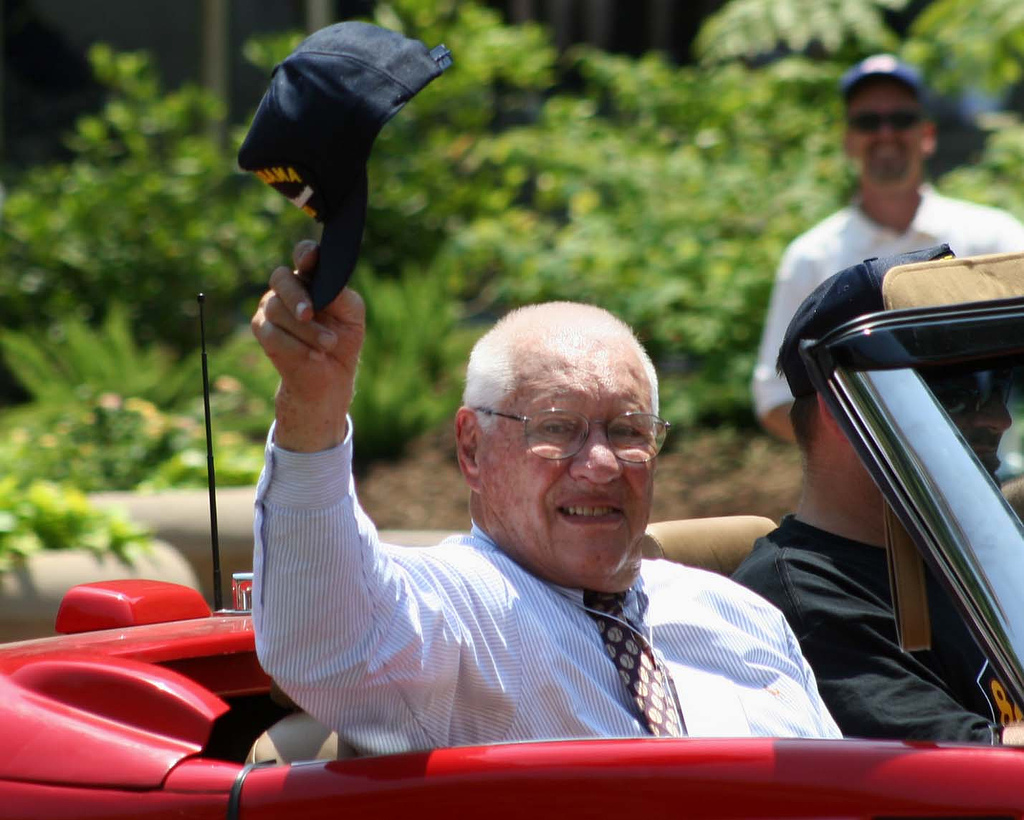
Bob Feller: six time AL Wins Champion

Three players have led their league in wins six times during their careers. Grover Cleveland Alexander led the National League in victories six times, with a single-season career-high 33 wins in 1916. In the American League, two pitchers have accomplished the same feat: Walter Johnson, whose 36 wins in 1913—his first season leading the league—were a single-season career high, and Bob Feller.

=== Five and four titles ===
In addition to his three American League wins, Young also led the National League twice (1892, 1895) to amass the third-highest total of win championships in major league history. Joe McGinnity and Tom Glavine also captured five wins titles in the National League. Pitchers who have led their league four times include Steve Carlton, Roger Clemens, Christy Mathewson, Hal Newhouser, and Robin Roberts.

=== Most wins in a Major League season ===
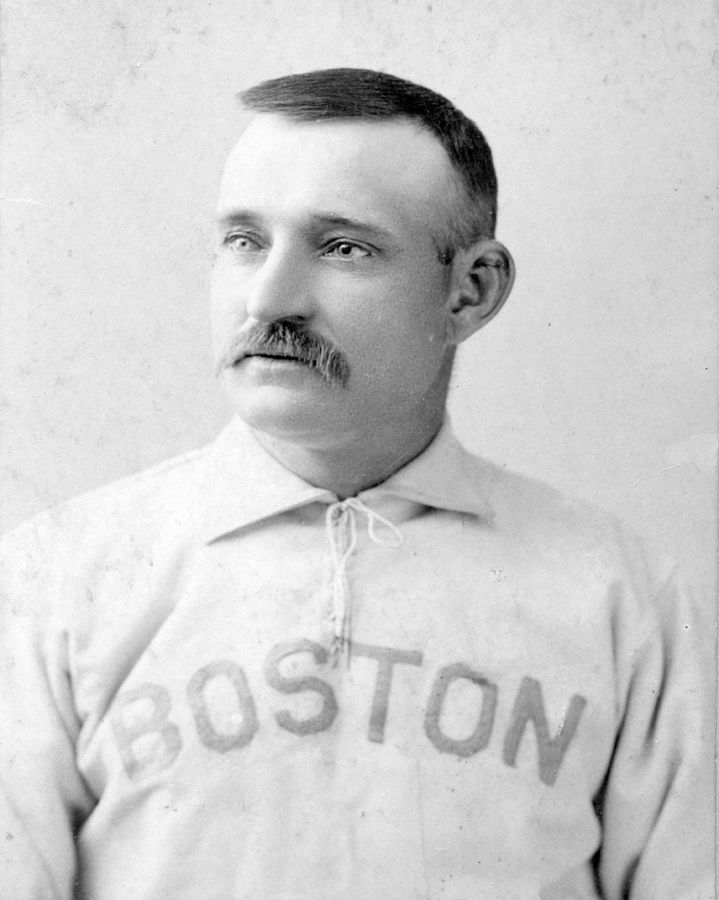
Charles Radbourn holds the Major League single-season record for most games won.

Charles "Old Hoss" Radbourn holds the single-season record for the most games won in a major league season; he notched 59 victories in 1884. There is a discrepancy in Radbourn's victory total in 1884. The classic MacMillan Baseball Encyclopedia, as well as other sources, credit Radbourn with 60 wins (against 12 losses), while other sources place his win total as high as 62. He and John Clarkson (53 wins in 1885) are the only pitchers to exceed 50 wins in a single season in the current major leagues; Guy Hecker also accomplished the feat in the American Association. The American League leader is Jack Chesbro, who won 41 games for the New York Highlanders in 1904; his total is the highest since 1901. The highest total in the National League since 1901 is Mathewson's 37 victories in 1908. The largest margin of victory for the title is 21 wins, achieved by Clarkson in 1889; he won 49 games, while his closest competitors (Charlie Buffinton and Tim Keefe) won 28 each. The American League title's largest margin of victory is 16 wins: Ed Walsh notched 40 wins in 1908, followed by Addie Joss and Ed Summers with 24 victories.

The number of wins required to lead the league each season has gone down significantly over the last century. For example, from 1900 to 1920, the average number of wins for the AL league leader was 30.8, while from 2004 to 2026 (the COVID-shortened 2020 season, a 60-game season, was statistically calculated as based on a 162 game season rounded down, is included), it was 19.7.

=== Ties ===
Ties for the win championship are common. The most recent tie in the American League was in 2023, when Chris Bassitt and Zach Eflin tied for the lead with 16 wins each, and the most recent tie in the National League was in 2018, when Jon Lester, Miles Mikolas and Max Scherzer tied with 18 wins each. The most pitchers to share the title in a single season is six, accomplished in 2006 when Aaron Harang, Derek Lowe, Brad Penny, John Smoltz, Brandon Webb, and Carlos Zambrano each won 16 games in the National League. In the American League, four pitchers shared the award in the strike-shortened 1981 season.

== Key ==
Year	Links to the corresponding "year in baseball" or "Major League Baseball season" article
Champion(s)	Player or players with the highest win total in the league
W	Number of wins
Runner(s)-up	Player or players with the second-best win total in the league
League	Denoted only for players outside of the modern major leagues
†	Member of the National Baseball Hall of Fame and Museum

== National League ==
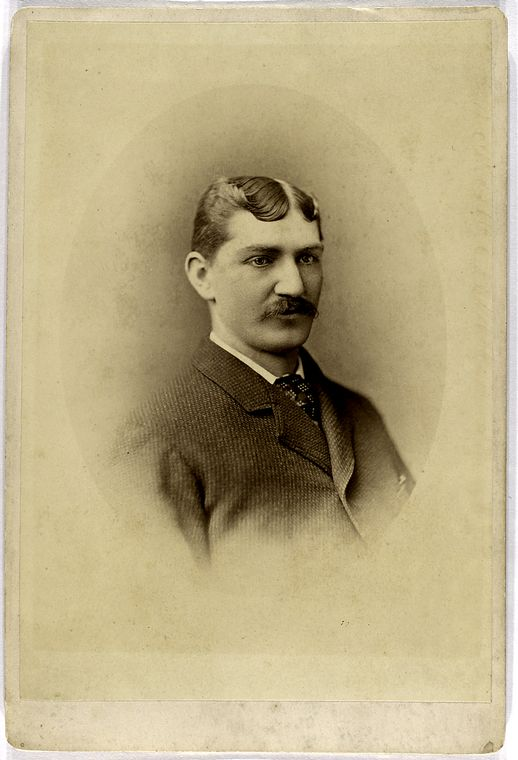
Tommy Bond won the triple crown in 1877, leading the National League in wins, strikeouts, and earned run average.

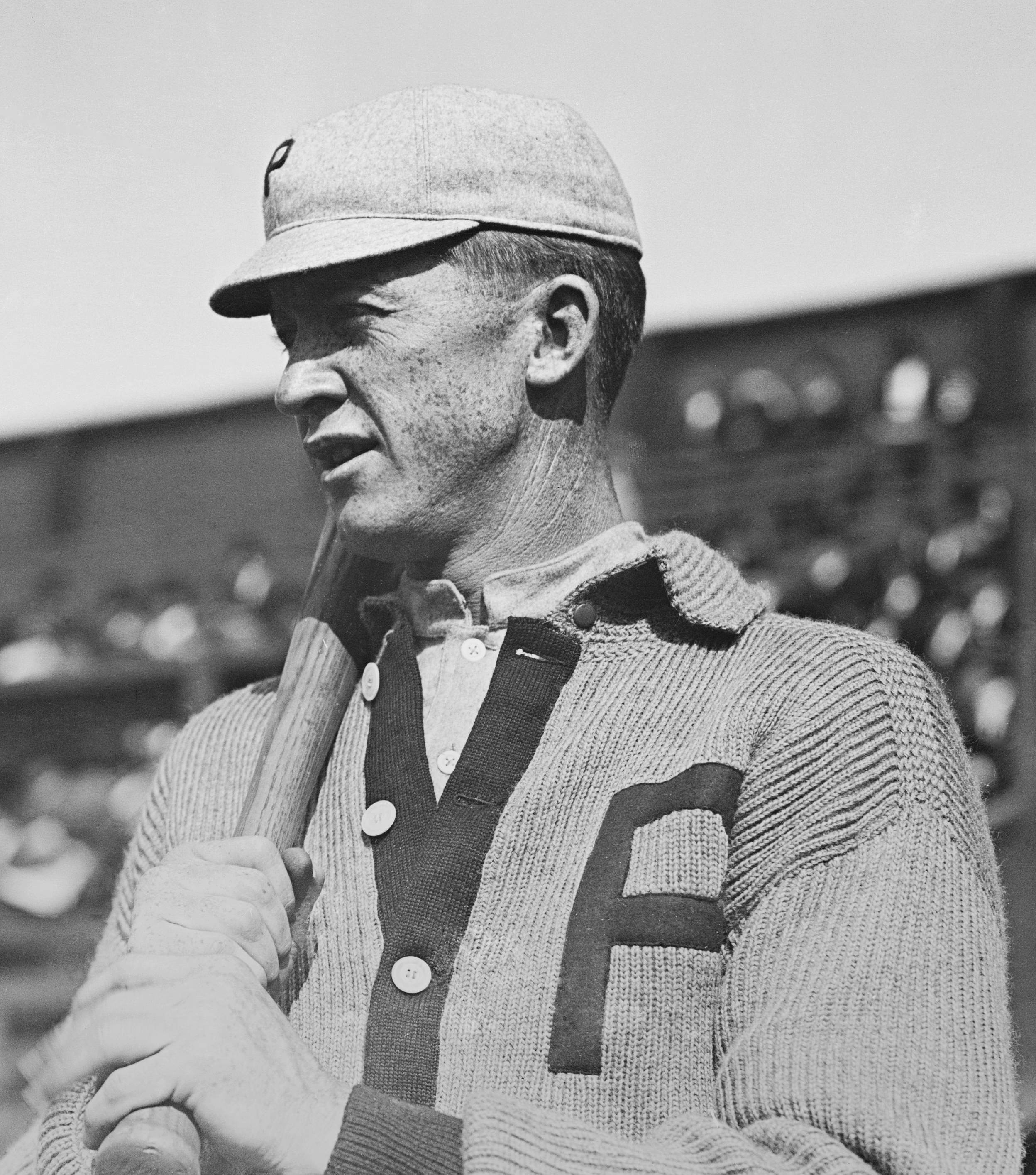
Grover Cleveland Alexander led the National League in wins six times in ten seasons.

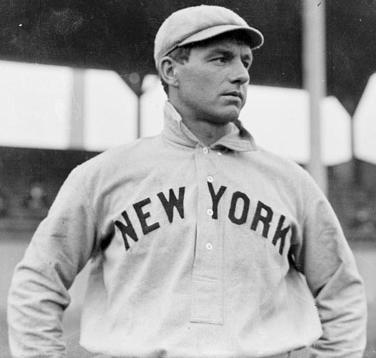
Hall of Famer Joe McGinnity captured the National League win championship five times.

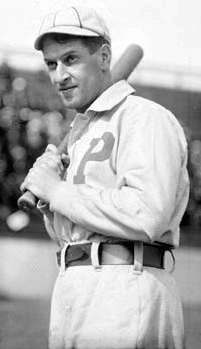
Kid Nichols led the National League in wins three consecutive seasons (1896–1898).

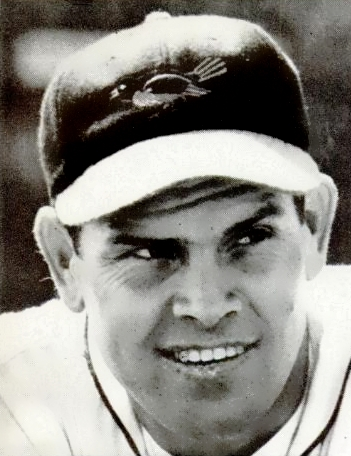
Robin Roberts led the National League in wins four years in a row (1952–1955).

Hall of Famer Sandy Koufax led the NL in wins three times before retiring at the age of 30.

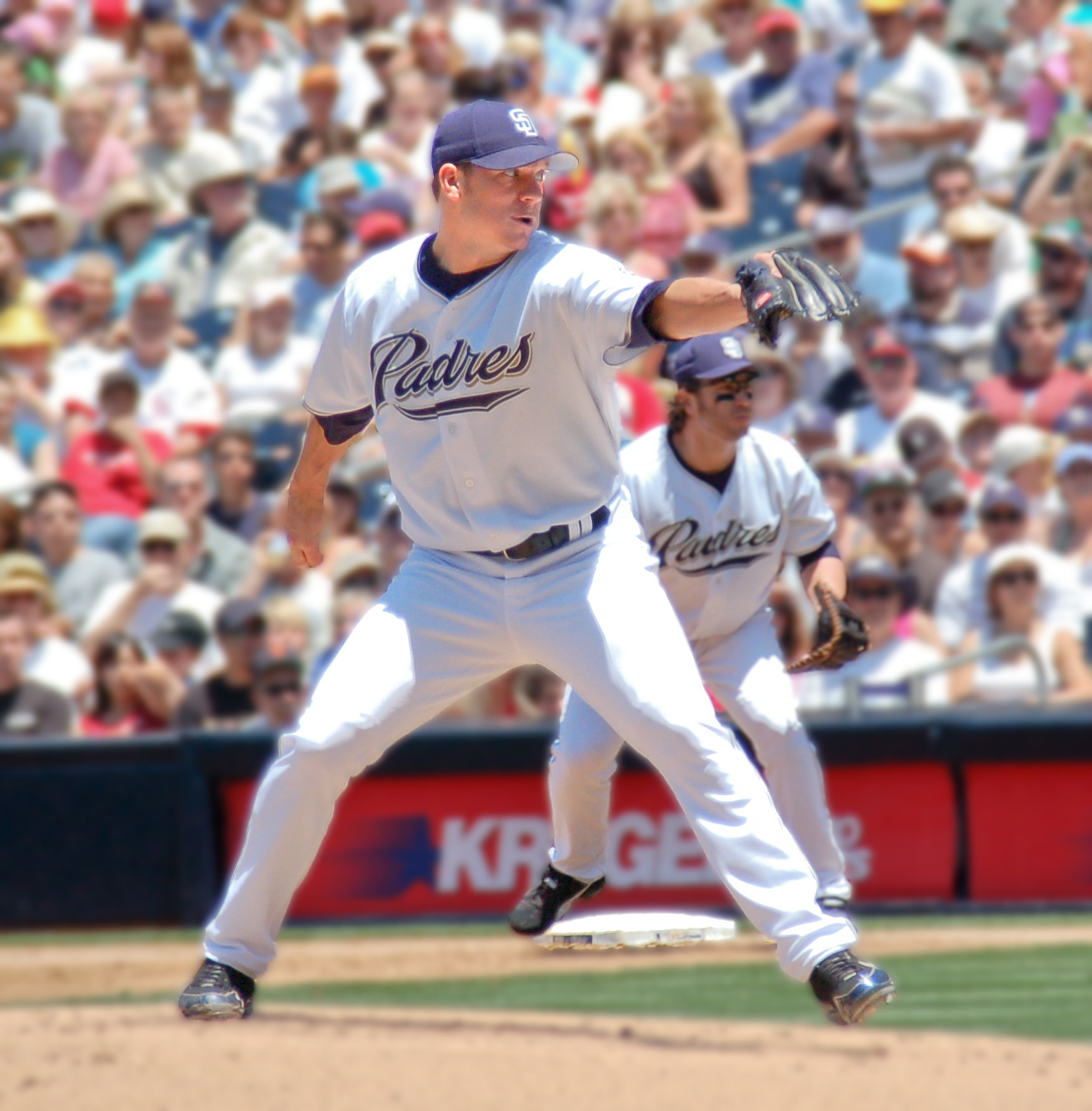
Jake Peavy's 19 wins in 2007 led all National League pitchers.

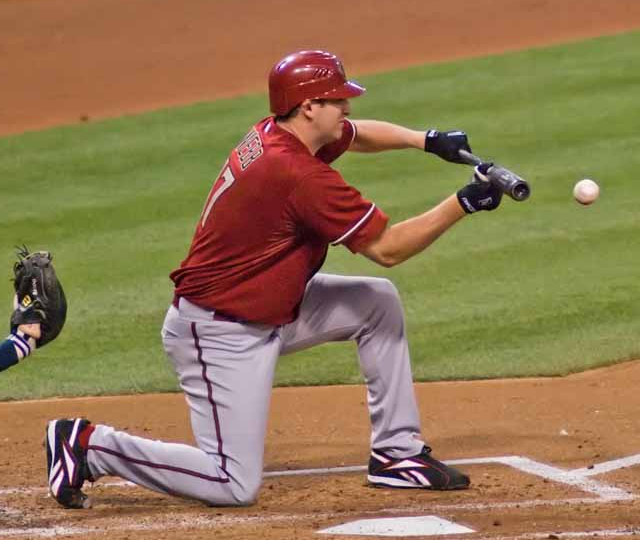
2006 Cy Young Award winner Brandon Webb led the National League with 22 wins in 2008.

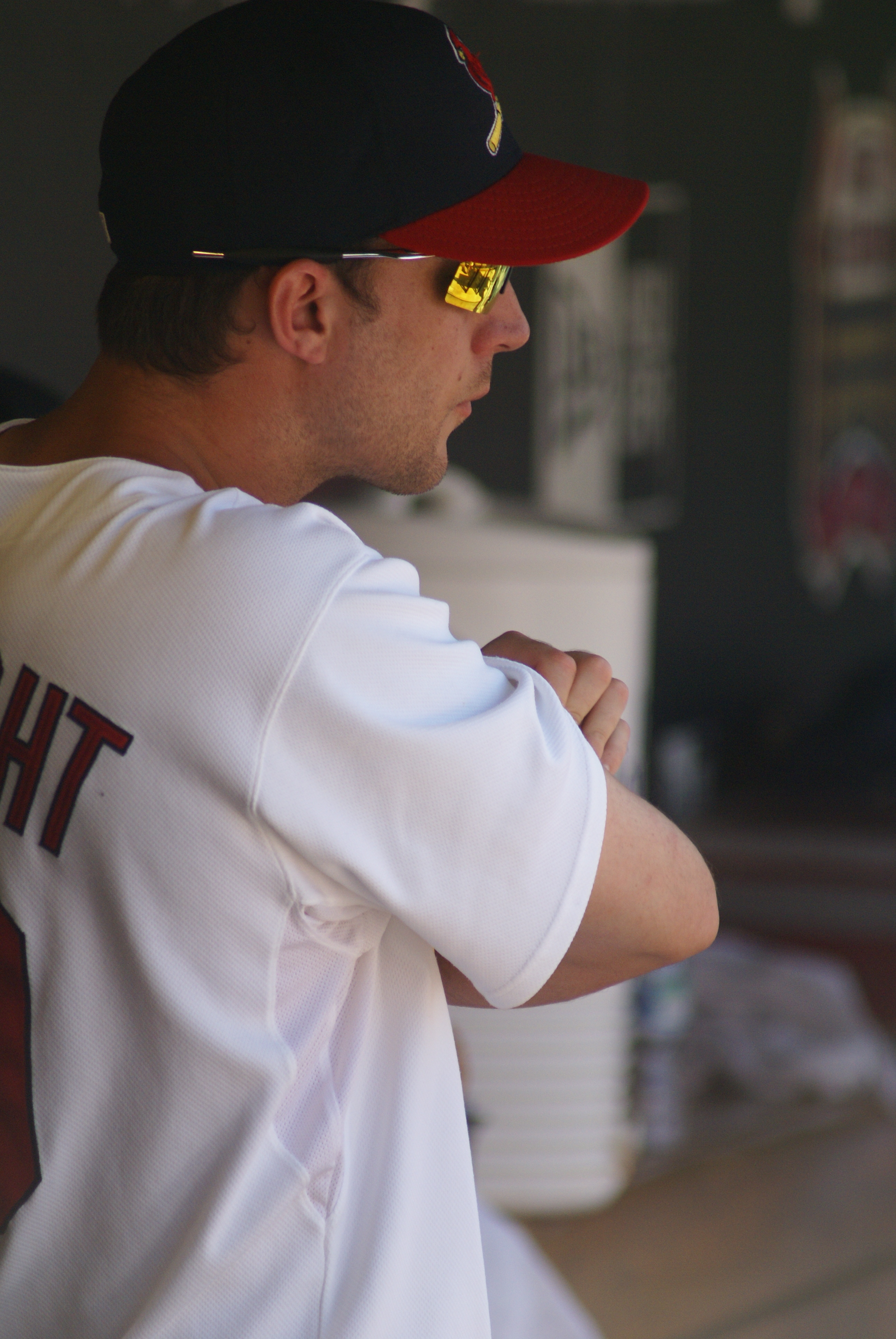
Adam Wainwright (19 wins) and St. Louis Cardinals teammate Chris Carpenter (17 wins) were first and second in the 2009 win table, respectively.

Year	Champion(s)	W	Team	Runner(s)-up	W	Ref
1876	Albert Spalding^{†}	47	Chicago White Stockings	George Bradley	45	
1877	Tommy Bond	40	Boston Red Caps	Jim Devlin	35	
1878	Tommy Bond	40	Boston Red Caps	Will White	30	
1879	John Montgomery Ward^{†}	47	Providence Grays	Tommy Bond; Will White	43	
1880	Jim McCormick	45	Cleveland Blues	Larry Corcoran	43	
1881	Larry Corcoran; Jim Whitney	31	Chicago White Stockings; Boston Red Caps	George Derby	29	
1882	Jim McCormick	36	Cleveland Blues	Charles Radbourn^{†}	33	
1883	Charles Radbourn^{†}	48	Providence Grays	Pud Galvin^{†}	46	
1884	Charles Radbourn^{†}	60	Providence Grays	Charlie Buffinton	46	
1885	John Clarkson^{†}	53	Chicago White Stockings	Mickey Welch^{†}	44	
1886	Lady Baldwin; Tim Keefe^{†}	42	Detroit Wolverines; New York Giants	John Clarkson^{†}	36	
1887	John Clarkson^{†}	38	Chicago White Stockings	Tim Keefe^{†}	35	
1888	Tim Keefe^{†}	35	New York Giants	John Clarkson^{†}	33	
1889	John Clarkson^{†}	49	Boston Beaneaters	Bob Caruthers	40	
1890	Bill Hutchison	41	Chicago White Stockings	Kid Gleason	38	
1891	Bill Hutchison	44	Chicago White Stockings	John Clarkson^{†} Amos Rusie^{†}	33	
1892	Bill Hutchison; Cy Young^{†}	36	Chicago White Stockings; Cleveland Spiders	Kid Nichols^{†} Jack Stivetts	35	
1893	Frank Killen	36	Pittsburgh Pirates	Kid Nichols^{†} Cy Young^{†}	34	
1894	Amos Rusie^{†}	36	New York Giants	Jouett Meekin	33	
1895	Cy Young^{†}	35	Cleveland Spiders	Bill Hoffer; Pink Hawley	31	
1896	Frank Killen; Kid Nichols^{†}	30	Pittsburgh Pirates; Boston Beaneaters	Cy Young^{†}	28	
1897	Kid Nichols^{†}	31	Boston Beaneaters	Amos Rusie^{†}	28	
1898	Kid Nichols^{†}	31	Boston Beaneaters	Bert Cunningham	28	
1899	Jay Hughes; Joe McGinnity^{†}	28	Baltimore Orioles; Brooklyn Superbas	Vic Willis^{†}	27	
1900	Joe McGinnity^{†}	28	Brooklyn Superbas	Bill Dinneen; Brickyard Kennedy; Deacon Phillippe; Jesse Tannehill	20	
1901	Bill Donovan	25	Brooklyn Superbas	Jack Harper	23	
1902	Jack Chesbro^{†}	28	Pittsburgh Pirates	Togie Pittinger; Vic Willis^{†}	27	
1903	Joe McGinnity^{†}	31	New York Giants	Christy Mathewson^{†}	30	
1904	Joe McGinnity^{†}	35	New York Giants	Christy Mathewson^{†}	33	
1905	Christy Mathewson^{†}	31	New York Giants	Togie Pittinger	23	
1906	Joe McGinnity^{†}	27	New York Giants	Mordecai Brown^{†}	26	
1907	Christy Mathewson^{†}	24	New York Giants	Orval Overall	23	
1908	Christy Mathewson^{†}	37	New York Giants	Mordecai Brown^{†}	29	
1909	Mordecai Brown^{†}	27	Chicago Cubs	Howie Camnitz; Christy Mathewson^{†}	25	
1910	Christy Mathewson^{†}	27	New York Giants	Mordecai Brown^{†}	25	
1911	Grover Cleveland Alexander^{†}	28	Philadelphia Phillies	Christy Mathewson^{†}	26	
1912	Larry Cheney; Rube Marquard^{†}	26	Chicago Cubs; New York Giants	Claude Hendrix	24	
1913	Tom Seaton	27	Philadelphia Phillies	Christy Mathewson^{†}	25	
1914	Grover Cleveland Alexander^{†}	27	Philadelphia Phillies	Bill James; Dick Rudolph; Jeff Tesreau	26	
1915	Grover Cleveland Alexander^{†}	31	Philadelphia Phillies	Dick Rudolph	22	
1916	Grover Cleveland Alexander^{†}	33	Philadelphia Phillies	Jeff Pfeffer	25	
1917	Grover Cleveland Alexander^{†}	30	Philadelphia Phillies	Fred Toney	24	
1918	Hippo Vaughn	22	Chicago Cubs	Claude Hendrix	20	
1919	Jesse Barnes	25	New York Giants	Slim Sallee; Hippo Vaughn	21	
1920	Grover Cleveland Alexander^{†}	27	Chicago Cubs	Wilbur Cooper	24	
1921	Wilbur Cooper; Burleigh Grimes^{†}	22	Pittsburgh Pirates; Brooklyn Robins	Art Nehf; Joe Oeschger	20	
1922	Eppa Rixey^{†}	25	Cincinnati Reds	Wilbur Cooper	23	
1923	Dolf Luque	27	Cincinnati Reds	Johnny Morrison	25	
1924	Dazzy Vance^{†}	28	Brooklyn Robins	Burleigh Grimes^{†}	22	
1925	Dazzy Vance^{†}	22	Brooklyn Robins	Pete Donohue; Eppa Rixey^{†}	21	
1926	Pete Donohue; Ray Kremer; Lee Meadows; Flint Rhem	20	Cincinnati Reds; Pittsburgh Pirates; Pittsburgh Pirates; St. Louis Cardinals	Carl Mays	19	
1927	Charlie Root	26	Chicago Cubs	Jesse Haines^{†}	24	
1928	Larry Benton; Burleigh Grimes^{†}	25	New York Giants; Pittsburgh Pirates	Dazzy Vance^{†}	22	
1929	Pat Malone	22	Chicago Cubs	Red Lucas; Charlie Root	19	
1930	Ray Kremer; Pat Malone	20	Pittsburgh Pirates; Chicago Cubs	Freddie Fitzsimmons	19	
1931	Jumbo Elliott; Bill Hallahan; Heinie Meine	19	Philadelphia Phillies; St. Louis Cardinals; Pittsburgh Pirates	Ed Brandt; Paul Derringer; Freddie Fitzsimmons	18	
1932	Lon Warneke	22	Chicago Cubs	Watty Clark	20	
1933	Carl Hubbell^{†}	23	New York Giants	Guy Bush; Ben Cantwell; Dizzy Dean^{†}	20	
1934	Dizzy Dean^{†}	30	St. Louis Cardinals	Hal Schumacher	23	
1935	Dizzy Dean^{†}	28	St. Louis Cardinals	Carl Hubbell^{†}	23	
1936	Carl Hubbell^{†}	26	New York Giants	Dizzy Dean^{†}	24	
1937	Carl Hubbell^{†}	22	New York Giants	Lou Fette; Cliff Melton; Jim Turner	20	
1938	Bill Lee	22	Chicago Cubs	Paul Derringer	21	
1939	Bucky Walters	27	Cincinnati Reds	Paul Derringer	25	
1940	Bucky Walters	22	Cincinnati Reds	Paul Derringer; Claude Passeau	20	
1941	Kirby Higbe; Whit Wyatt	22	Brooklyn Dodgers; Brooklyn Dodgers	Elmer Riddle; Bucky Walters	19	
1942	Mort Cooper	22	St. Louis Cardinals	Johnny Beazley	21	
1943	Mort Cooper; Elmer Riddle; Rip Sewell	21	St. Louis Cardinals; Cincinnati Reds; Pittsburgh Pirates	Hiram Bithorn	18	
1944	Bucky Walters	23	Cincinnati Reds	Mort Cooper	22	
1945	Red Barrett	23	Boston Braves; St. Louis Cardinals	Hank Wyse	22	
1946	Howie Pollet	21	St. Louis Cardinals	Johnny Sain	20	
1947	Ewell Blackwell	22	Cincinnati Reds	Ralph Branca; Larry Jansen; Johnny Sain; Warren Spahn^{†}	21	
1948	Johnny Sain	24	Boston Braves	Harry Brecheen	20	
1949	Warren Spahn^{†}	21	Boston Braves	Howie Pollet	20	
1950	Warren Spahn^{†}	21	Boston Braves	Robin Roberts^{†} Johnny Sain	20	
1951	Larry Jansen; Sal Maglie	23	New York Giants; New York Giants	Preacher Roe; Warren Spahn^{†}	22	
1952	Robin Roberts^{†}	28	Philadelphia Phillies	Sal Maglie	18	
1953	Robin Roberts^{†} Warren Spahn^{†}	23	Philadelphia Phillies; Milwaukee Braves	Carl Erskine; Harvey Haddix	20	
1954	Robin Roberts^{†}	23	Philadelphia Phillies	Johnny Antonelli; Warren Spahn^{†}	21	
1955	Robin Roberts^{†}	23	Philadelphia Phillies	Don Newcombe	20	
1956	Don Newcombe	27	Brooklyn Dodgers	Johnny Antonelli; Warren Spahn^{†}	20	
1957	Warren Spahn^{†}	21	Milwaukee Braves	Jack Sanford	19	
1958	Bob Friend; Warren Spahn^{†}	22	Pittsburgh Pirates; Milwaukee Braves	Lew Burdette	20	
1959	Lew Burdette; Sam Jones; Warren Spahn^{†}	21	Milwaukee Braves; San Francisco Giants; Milwaukee Braves	Johnny Antonelli	19	
1960	Ernie Broglio; Warren Spahn^{†}	21	St. Louis Cardinals; Milwaukee Braves	Vern Law	20	
1961	Joey Jay; Warren Spahn^{†}	21	Cincinnati Reds; Milwaukee Braves	Jim O'Toole	19	
1962	Don Drysdale^{†}	25	Los Angeles Dodgers	Jack Sanford	24	
1963	Sandy Koufax^{†} Juan Marichal^{†}	25	Los Angeles Dodgers; San Francisco Giants	Jim Maloney; Warren Spahn^{†}	23	
1964	Larry Jackson	24	Chicago Cubs	Juan Marichal^{†}	21	
1965	Sandy Koufax^{†}	26	Los Angeles Dodgers	Tony Cloninger	24	
1966	Sandy Koufax^{†}	27	Los Angeles Dodgers	Juan Marichal^{†}	25	
1967	Mike McCormick	22	San Francisco Giants	Ferguson Jenkins^{†}	20	
1968	Juan Marichal^{†}	26	San Francisco Giants	Bob Gibson^{†}	22	
1969	Tom Seaver^{†}	25	New York Mets	Phil Niekro^{†}	23	
1970	Bob Gibson^{†} Gaylord Perry^{†}	23	St. Louis Cardinals; San Francisco Giants	Ferguson Jenkins^{†}	22	
1971	Ferguson Jenkins^{†}	24	Chicago Cubs	Steve Carlton^{†} Al Downing; Tom Seaver^{†}	20	
1972	Steve Carlton^{†}	27	Philadelphia Phillies	Tom Seaver^{†}	21	
1973	Ron Bryant	24	San Francisco Giants	Jack Billingham; Tom Seaver^{†}	19	
1974	Andy Messersmith; Phil Niekro^{†}	20	Los Angeles Dodgers; Atlanta Braves	Jack Billingham; Don Sutton^{†}	19	
1975	Tom Seaver^{†}	22	New York Mets	Randy Jones	20	
1976	Randy Jones	22	San Diego Padres	Jerry Koosman; Don Sutton^{†}	21	
1977	Steve Carlton^{†}	23	Philadelphia Phillies	Tom Seaver^{†}	21	
1978	Gaylord Perry^{†}	21	San Diego Padres	Ross Grimsley	20	
1979	Joe Niekro; Phil Niekro^{†}	21	Houston Astros; Atlanta Braves	Steve Carlton^{†} J. R. Richard; Rick Reuschel	18	
1980	Steve Carlton^{†}	24	Philadelphia Phillies	Joe Niekro	20	
1981	Tom Seaver^{†}	14	Cincinnati Reds	Steve Carlton^{†} Fernando Valenzuela	13	
1982	Steve Carlton^{†}	23	Philadelphia Phillies	Steve Rogers; Fernando Valenzuela	19	
1983	John Denny	19	Philadelphia Phillies	Bill Gullickson; Steve Rogers; Mario Soto	17	
1984	Joaquín Andújar	20	St. Louis Cardinals	Mario Soto	18	
1985	Dwight Gooden	24	New York Mets	Joaquín Andújar; John Tudor	21	
1986	Fernando Valenzuela	21	Los Angeles Dodgers	Mike Krukow	20	
1987	Rick Sutcliffe	18	Chicago Cubs	Shane Rawley	17	
1988	Orel Hershiser; Danny Jackson	23	Los Angeles Dodgers; Cincinnati Reds	David Cone	20	
1989	Mike Scott	20	Houston Astros	Greg Maddux^{†}	19	
1990	Doug Drabek	22	Pittsburgh Pirates	Ramón Martínez; Frank Viola	20	
1991	Tom Glavine^{†} John Smiley	20	Atlanta Braves; Pittsburgh Pirates	Steve Avery	18	
1992	Tom Glavine^{†} Greg Maddux^{†}	20	Atlanta Braves; Chicago Cubs	Ken Hill; Pedro Martínez^{†} Mike Morgan; Bob Tewksbury	16	
1993	John Burkett; Tom Glavine^{†}	22	San Francisco Giants; Atlanta Braves	Bill Swift	21	
1994	Ken Hill; Greg Maddux^{†}	16	Montreal Expos; Atlanta Braves	Danny Jackson; Bret Saberhagen	14	
1995	Greg Maddux^{†}	19	Atlanta Braves	Pete Schourek	18	
1996	John Smoltz^{†}	24	Atlanta Braves	Andy Benes	18	
1997	Denny Neagle	20	Atlanta Braves	Shawn Estes; Darryl Kile; Greg Maddux^{†}	19	
1998	Tom Glavine^{†}	20	Atlanta Braves	Shane Reynolds; Kevin Tapani	19	
1999	Mike Hampton	22	Houston Astros	José Lima	21	
2000	Tom Glavine^{†}	21	Atlanta Braves	Darryl Kile	20	
2001	Matt Morris; Curt Schilling	22	St. Louis Cardinals; Arizona Diamondbacks	Randy Johnson^{†}	21	
2002	Randy Johnson^{†}	24	Arizona Diamondbacks	Curt Schilling	23	
2003	Russ Ortiz	21	Atlanta Braves	Mark Prior; Woody Williams	18	
2004	Roy Oswalt	20	Houston Astros	Roger Clemens; Carl Pavano; Jason Schmidt	18	
2005	Dontrelle Willis	22	Florida Marlins	Chris Carpenter	21	
2006	Aaron Harang; Derek Lowe; Brad Penny; John Smoltz^{†} Brandon Webb; Carlos Zambrano	16	Cincinnati Reds; Los Angeles Dodgers; Los Angeles Dodgers; Atlanta Braves; Arizona Diamondbacks; Chicago Cubs	Chris Carpenter; Tom Glavine^{†} Greg Maddux^{†} Roy Oswalt; Steve Trachsel	15	
2007	Jake Peavy	19	San Diego Padres	Brandon Webb; Carlos Zambrano	18	
2008	Brandon Webb	22	Arizona Diamondbacks	Tim Lincecum	18	
2009	Adam Wainwright	19	St. Louis Cardinals	Chris Carpenter	17	
2010	Roy Halladay^{†}	21	Philadelphia Phillies	Adam Wainwright	20	
2011	Ian Kennedy; Clayton Kershaw	21	Arizona Diamondbacks; Los Angeles Dodgers	Roy Halladay^{†}	19	
2012	Gio González	21	Washington Nationals	R. A. Dickey	20	
2013	Adam Wainwright; Jordan Zimmermann	19	St. Louis Cardinals; Washington Nationals	Clayton Kershaw	16	
2014	Clayton Kershaw	21	Los Angeles Dodgers	Johnny Cueto; Adam Wainwright	20	
2015	Jake Arrieta	22	Chicago Cubs	Gerrit Cole; Zack Greinke	19	
2016	Max Scherzer	20	Washington Nationals	Jon Lester	19	
2017	Clayton Kershaw	18	Los Angeles Dodgers	Zach Davies; Zack Greinke	17	
2018	Jon Lester; Miles Mikolas; Max Scherzer	18	Chicago Cubs; St. Louis Cardinals; Washington Nationals	Kyle Freeland; Aaron Nola	17	
2019	Stephen Strasburg	18	Washington Nationals	Max Fried	17	
2020	Yu Darvish	8	Chicago Cubs	Zach Davies; Max Fried	7	
2021	Julio Urías	20	Los Angeles Dodgers	Adam Wainwright	17	
2022	Kyle Wright	21	Atlanta Braves	Julio Urías	17	
2023	Spencer Strider	20	Atlanta Braves	Zac Gallen	17	
2024	Chris Sale	18	Atlanta Braves	Zack Wheeler	16	
2025	Freddy Peralta	17	Milwaukee Brewers	Jesús Luzardo; Logan Webb	15	
2026	Cristopher Sánchez	18	Philadelphia Phillies	Jacob Misiorowski; Eduardo Rodríguez	16	

== American League ==
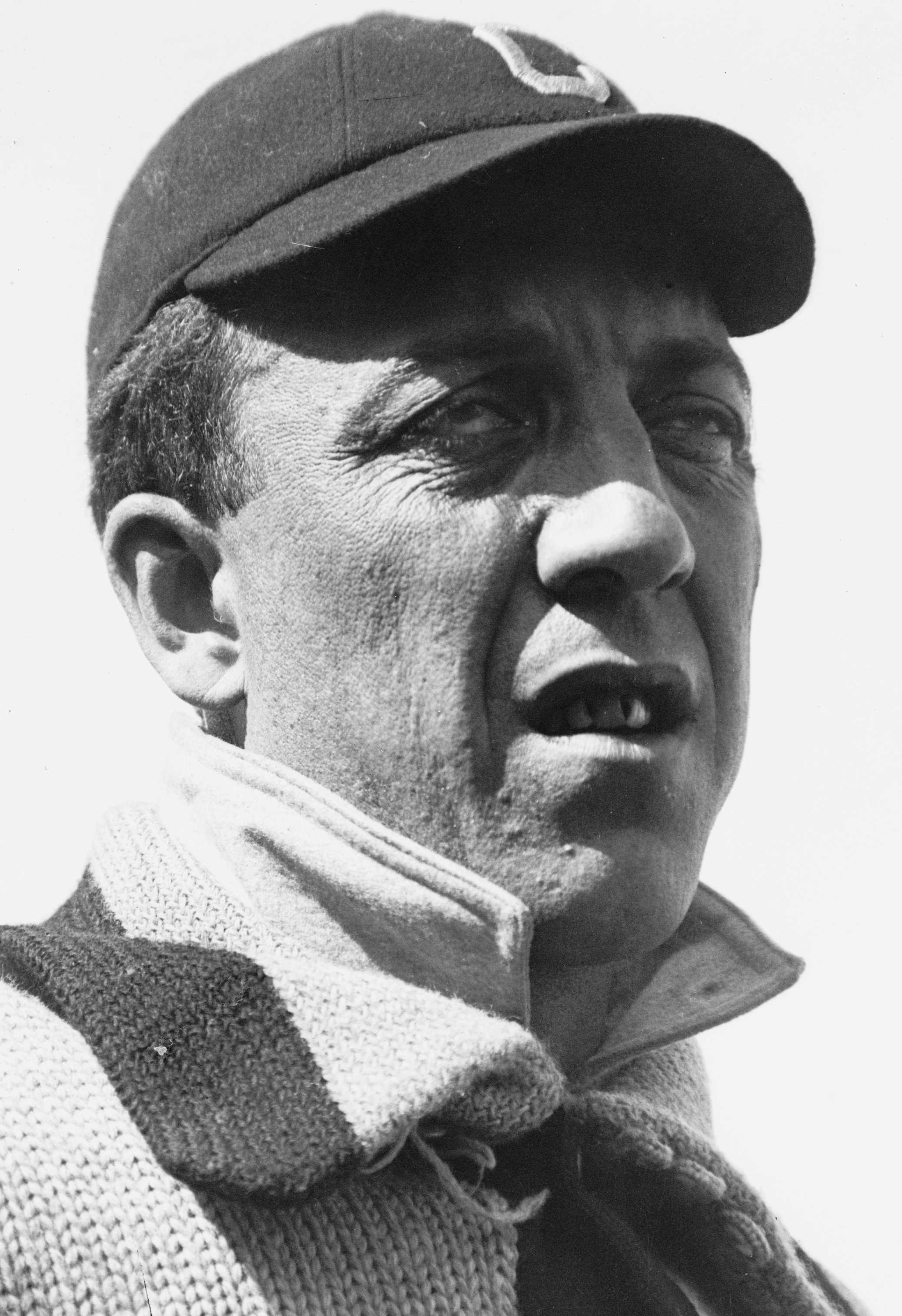
Addie Joss led the American League in wins in 1907.

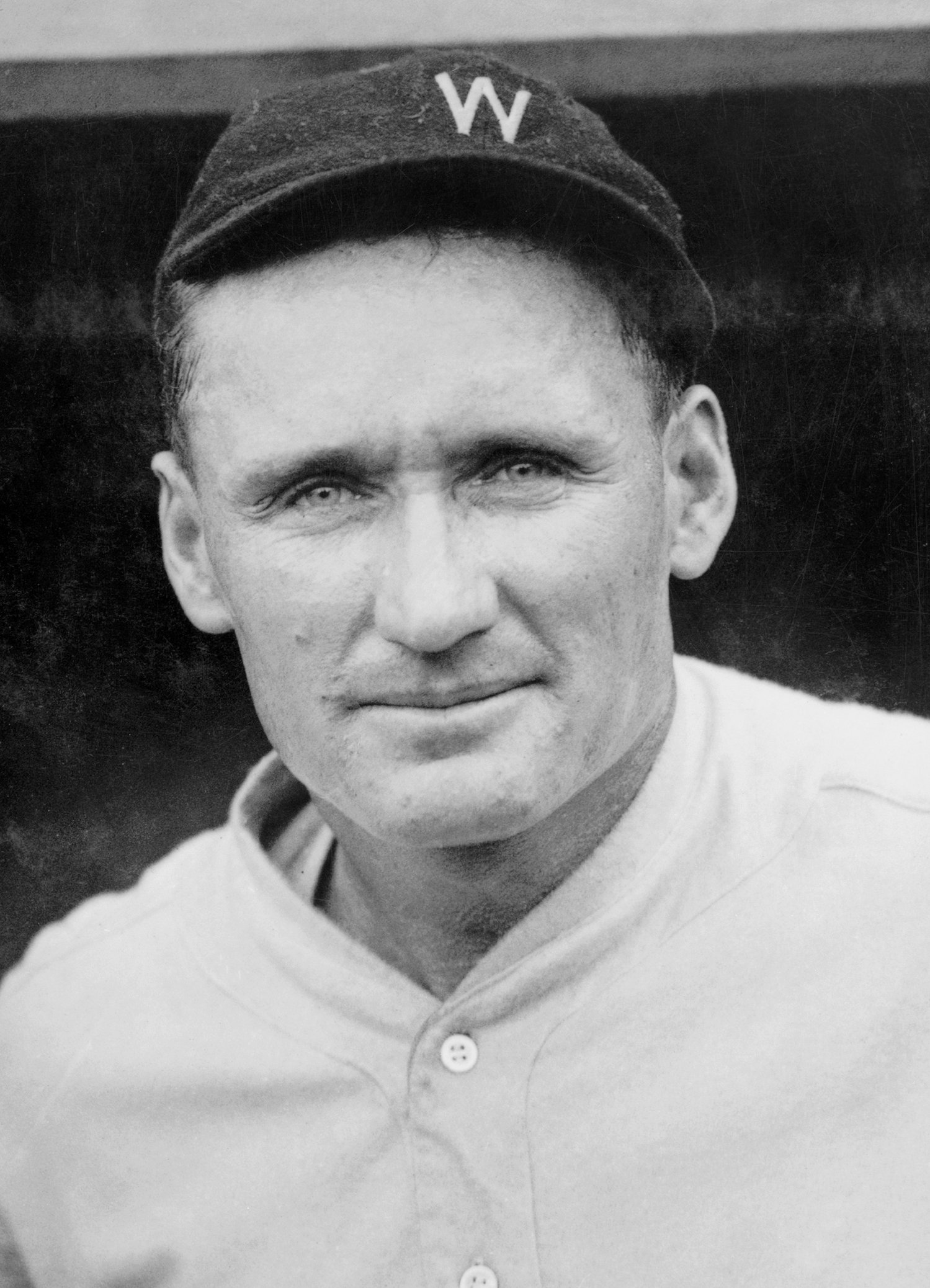
In addition to leading the American League in wins six times in his career and winning three triple crowns, Walter Johnson was one of the five charter members of the Baseball Hall of Fame.

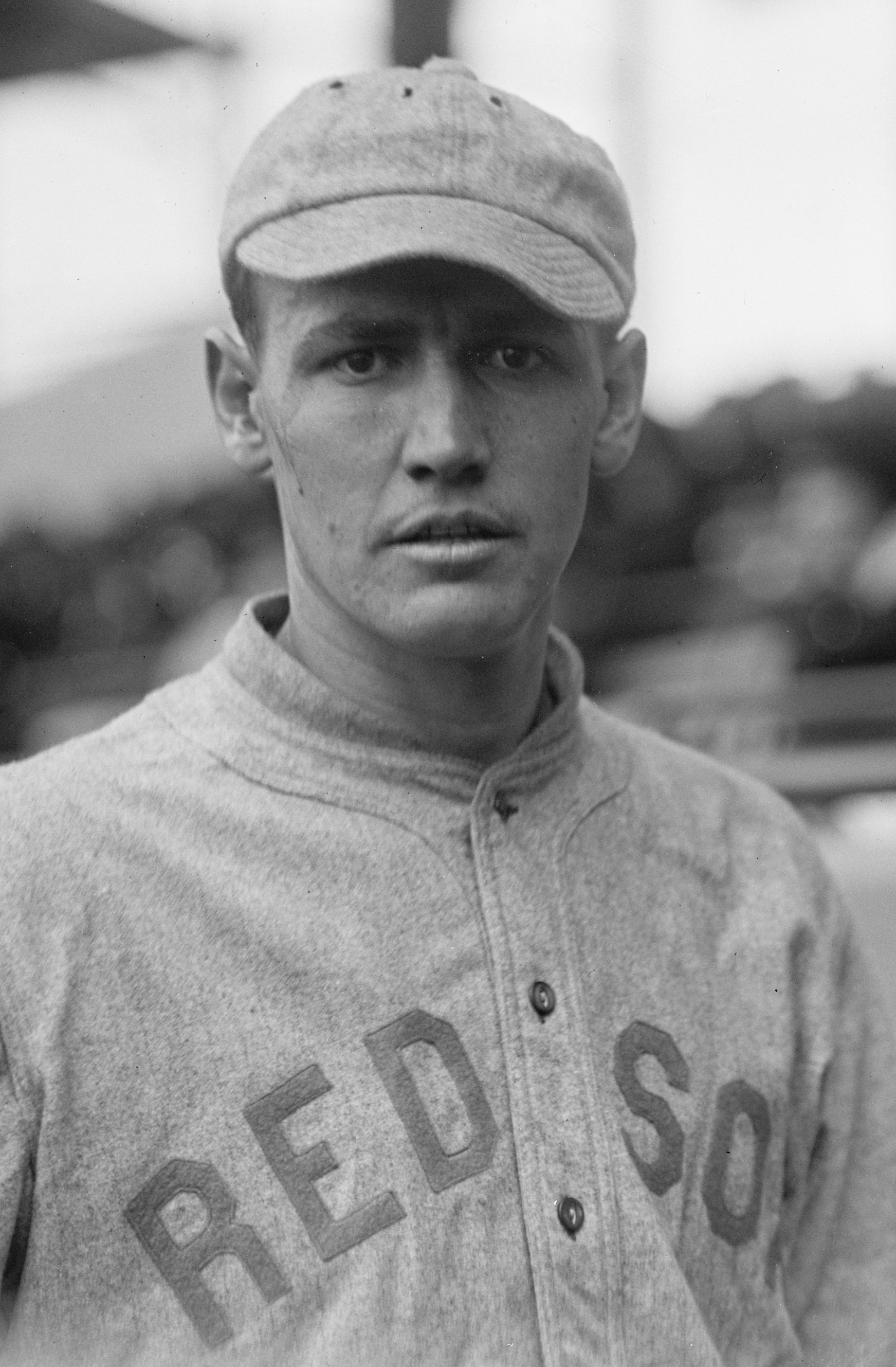
Joe Wood's 34 wins in 1912 were a career-high.

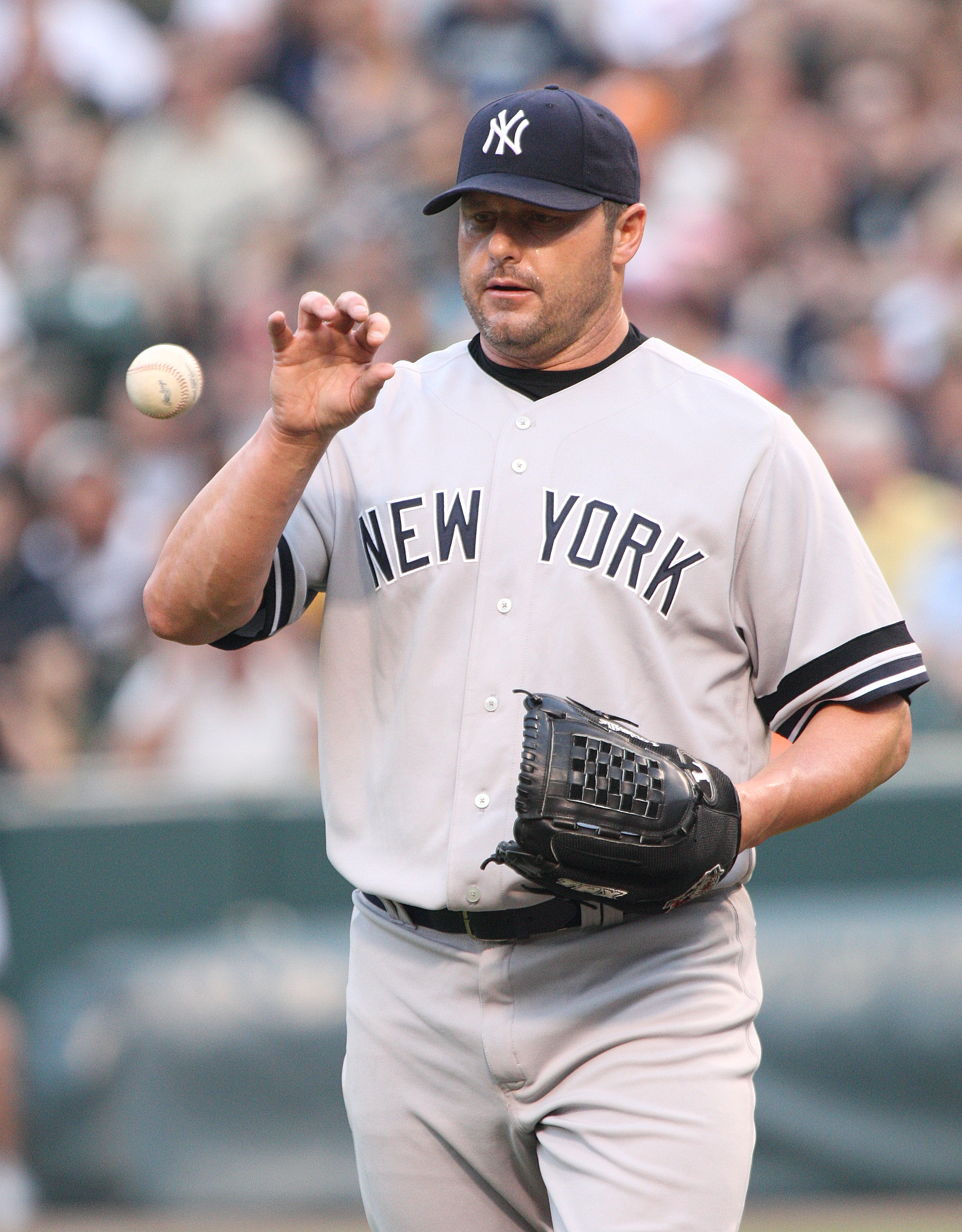
Roger Clemens won the most American League games in 1986 & 1987 for the Red Sox and 1997 & 1998 for the Blue Jays.

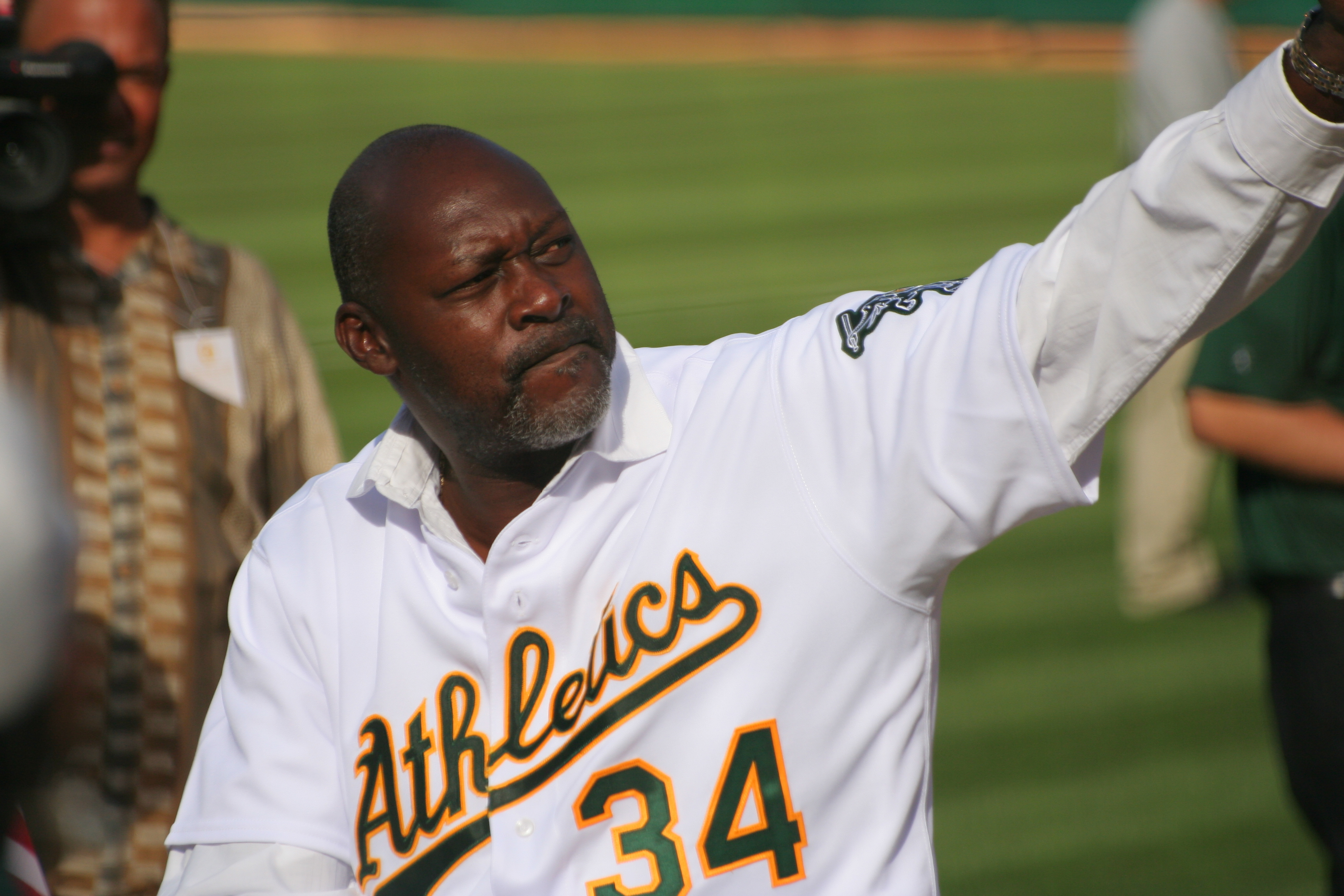
Dave Stewart won 20 games in 1987, finishing second in AL wins the following three seasons.

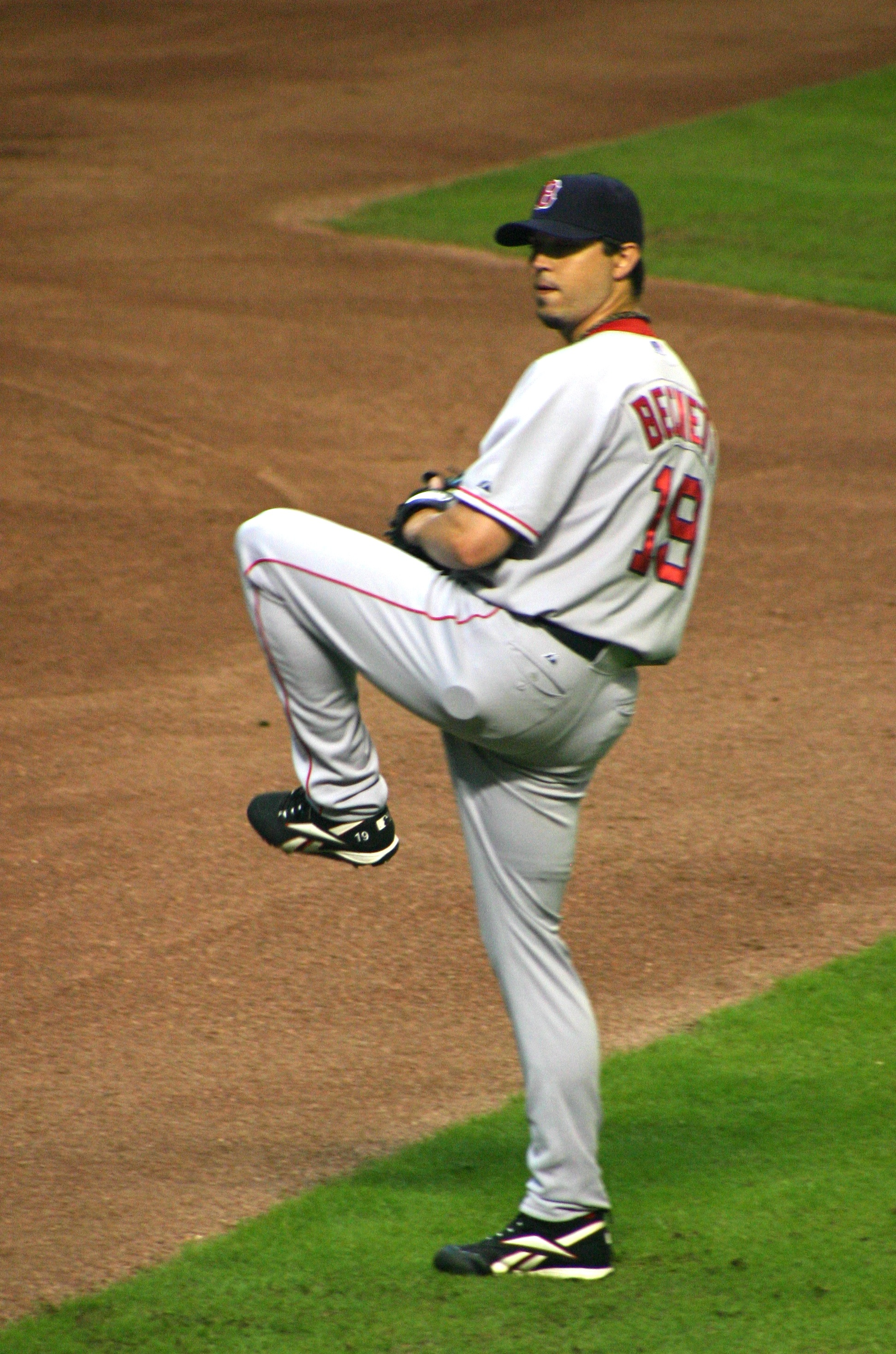
Josh Beckett's 20 wins in 2007 were best in the American League.

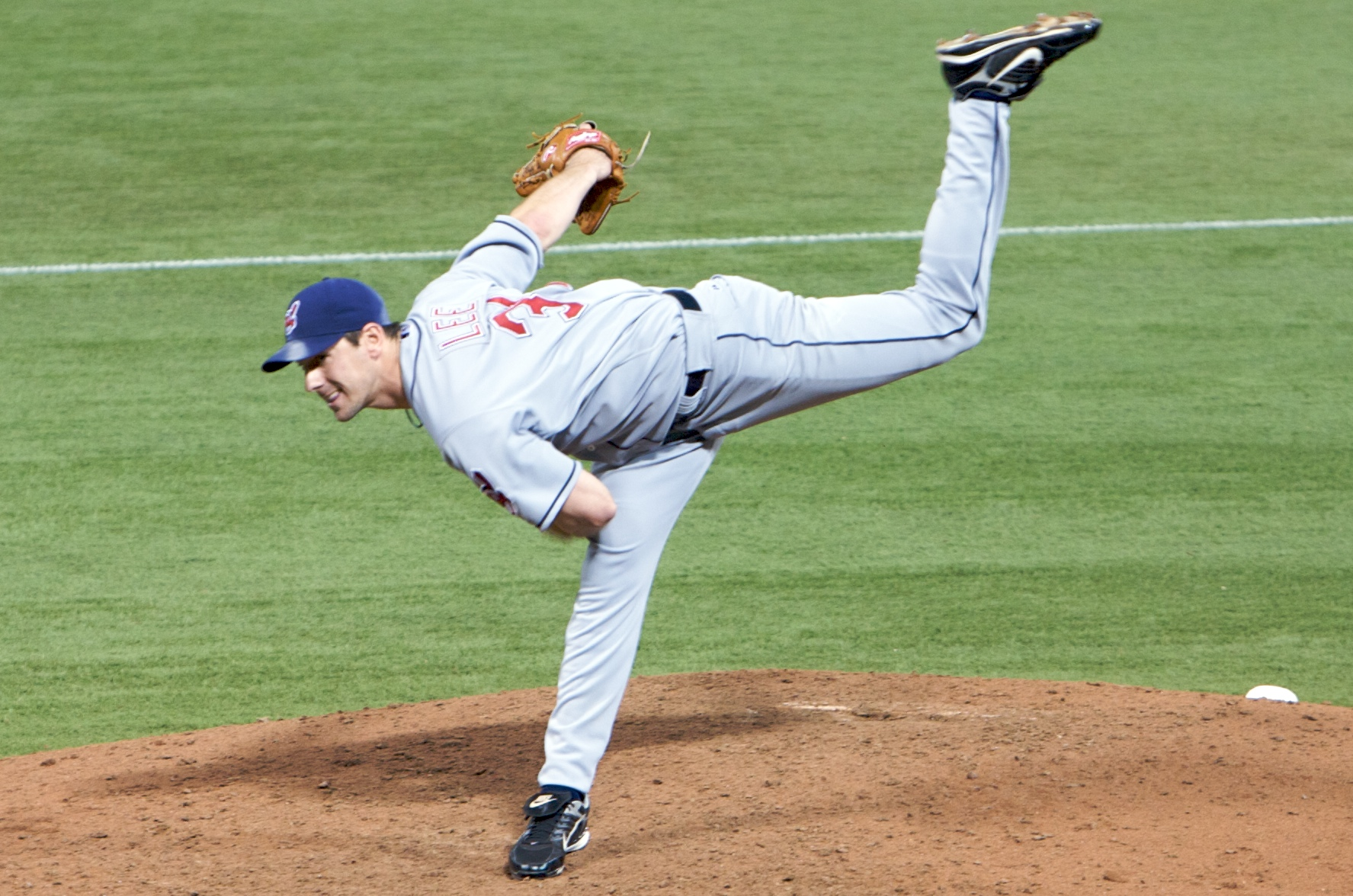
Cliff Lee captured the Cy Young Award in 2008 in addition to winning 22 games.

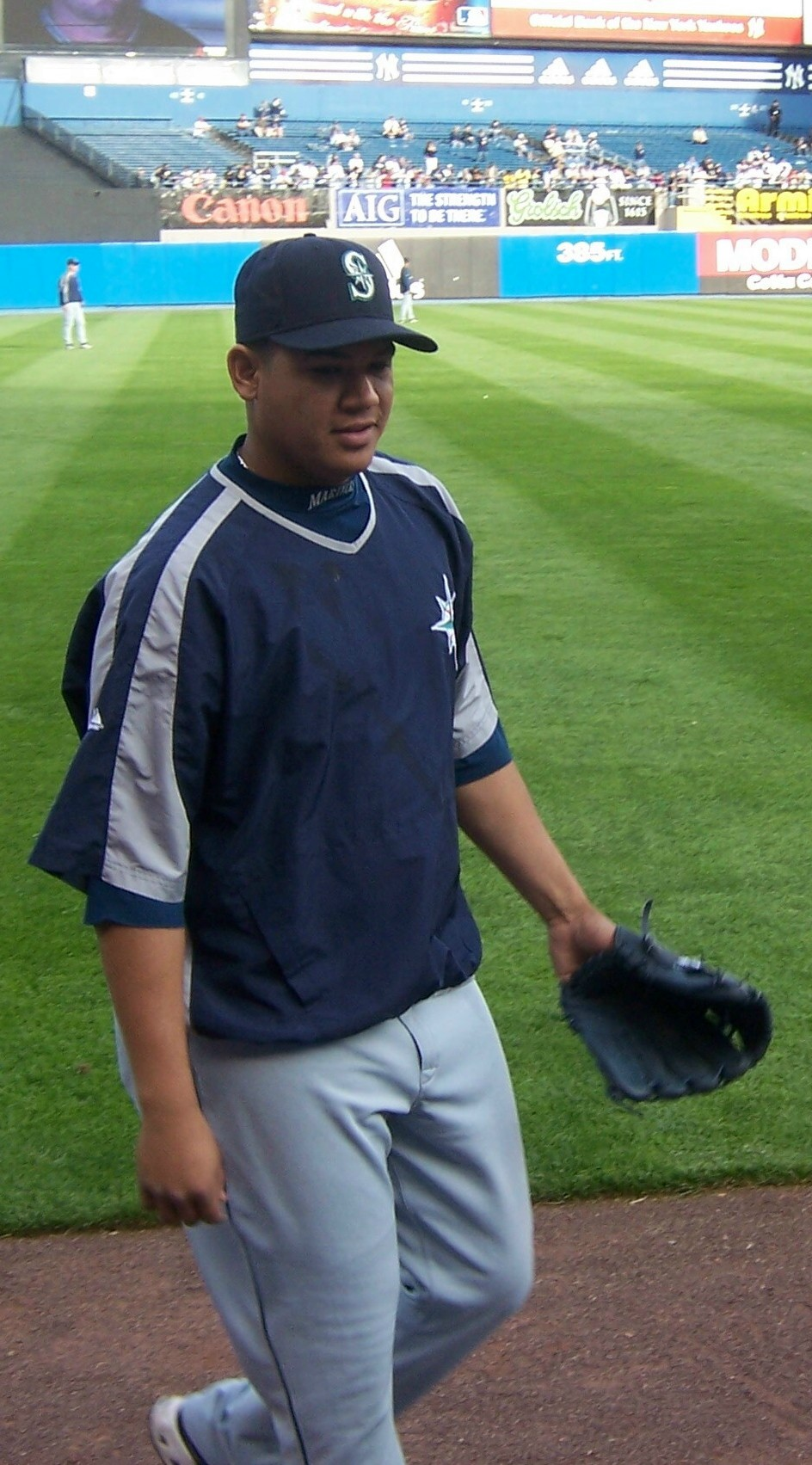
Félix Hernández won 19 games in 2009, one of three pitchers to do so.

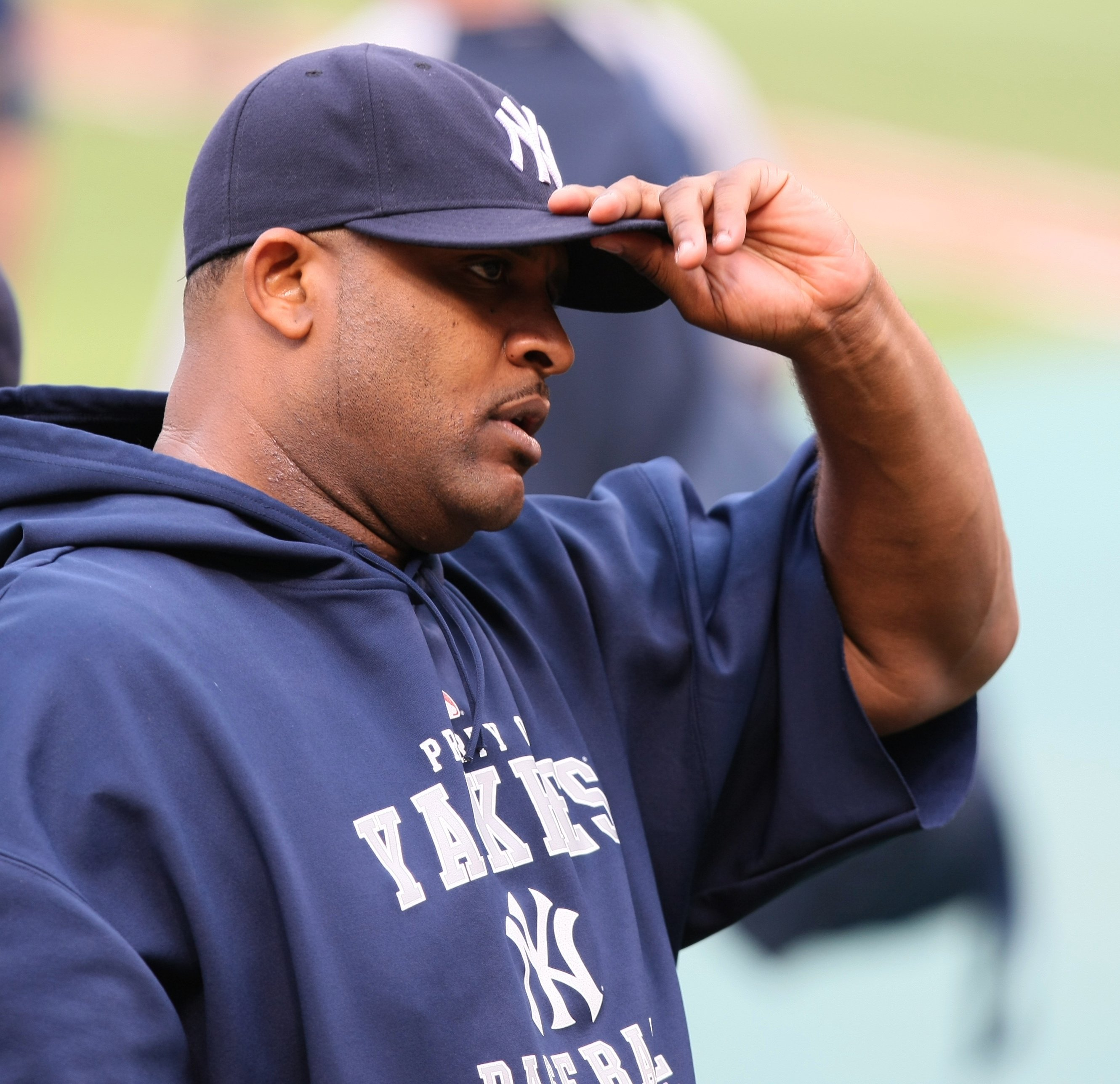
CC Sabathia started Game 1 of the 2009 World Series after winning 19 games for the Yankees that season.

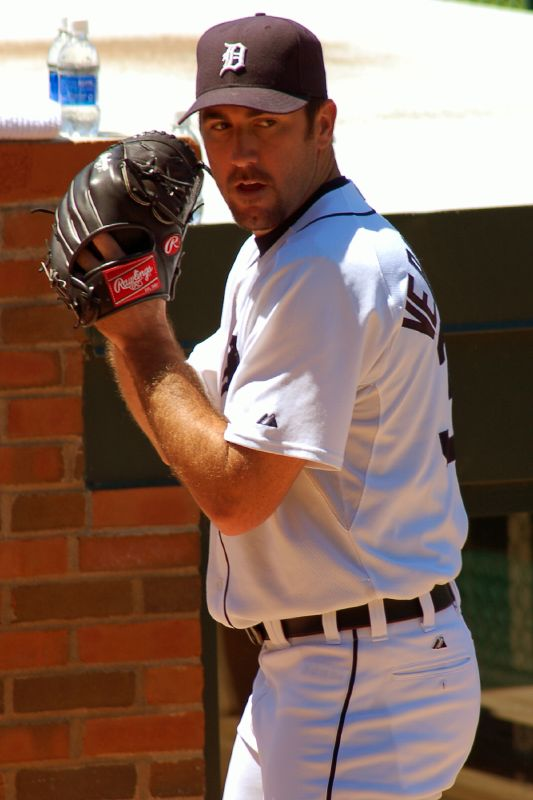
Justin Verlander also led the American League in strikeouts and innings pitched in 2009.

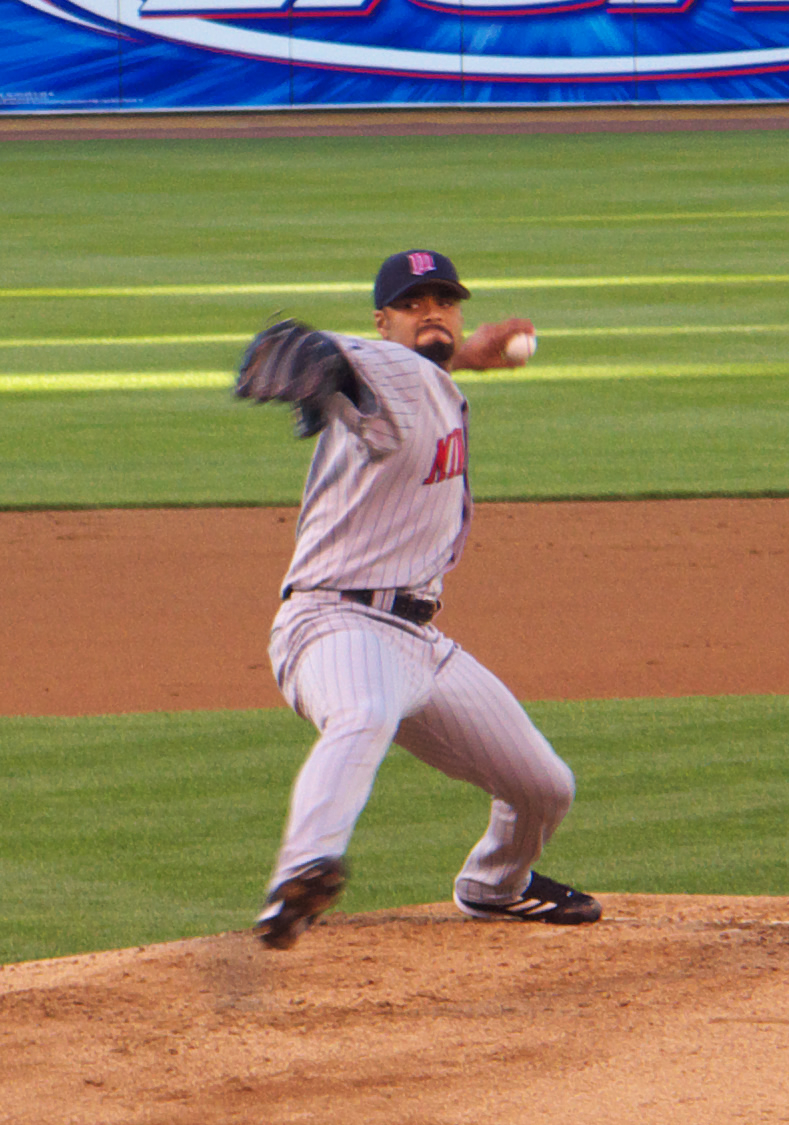
Johan Santana, 2006 AL Triple Crown winner

Year	Leader	W	Team	Runner-up	W	Ref
1901	Cy Young^{†}	33	Boston Americans	Joe McGinnity^{†}	26	
1902	Cy Young^{†}	32	Boston Americans	Rube Waddell^{†}	24	
1903	Cy Young^{†}	28	Boston Americans	Eddie Plank^{†}	23	
1904	Jack Chesbro^{†}	41	New York Highlanders	Eddie Plank^{†} Cy Young^{†}	26	
1905	Rube Waddell^{†}	27	Philadelphia Athletics	Eddie Plank^{†}	24	
1906	Al Orth	27	New York Highlanders	Jack Chesbro^{†}	23	
1907	Addie Joss^{†} Doc White	27	Cleveland Naps; Chicago White Sox	Bill Donovan; Ed Killian	25	
1908	Ed Walsh^{†}	40	Chicago White Sox	Addie Joss^{†} Ed Summers	24	
1909	George Mullin	29	Detroit Tigers	Frank Smith	25	
1910	Jack Coombs	31	Philadelphia Athletics	Russ Ford	26	
1911	Jack Coombs	28	Philadelphia Athletics	Ed Walsh^{†}	27	
1912	Joe Wood	34	Boston Red Sox	Walter Johnson^{†}	33	
1913	Walter Johnson^{†}	36	Washington Senators	Cy Falkenberg	23	
1914	Walter Johnson^{†}	28	Washington Senators	Stan Coveleski^{†}	22	
1915	Walter Johnson^{†}	27	Washington Senators	Hooks Dauss; Red Faber^{†} Jim Scott	24	
1916	Walter Johnson^{†}	25	Washington Senators	Bob Shawkey	24	
1917	Eddie Cicotte	28	Chicago White Sox	Babe Ruth^{†}	24	
1918	Walter Johnson^{†}	23	Washington Senators	Stan Coveleski^{†}	22	
1919	Eddie Cicotte	29	Chicago White Sox	Stan Coveleski^{†}	24	
1920	Jim Bagby	31	Cleveland Indians	Carl Mays	26	
1921	Carl Mays; Urban Shocker	27	New York Yankees; St. Louis Browns	Red Faber^{†}	25	
1922	Eddie Rommel	27	Philadelphia Athletics	Joe Bush	26	
1923	George Uhle	26	Cleveland Indians	Hooks Dauss; Sam Jones	21	
1924	Walter Johnson^{†}	23	Washington Senators	Herb Pennock^{†}	21	
1925	Ted Lyons^{†} Eddie Rommel	21	Chicago White Sox; Philadelphia Athletics	Stan Coveleski^{†} Walter Johnson^{†}	20	
1926	George Uhle	27	Cleveland Indians	Herb Pennock^{†}	23	
1927	Waite Hoyt^{†} Ted Lyons^{†}	22	New York Yankees; Chicago White Sox	Lefty Grove^{†}	20	
1928	Lefty Grove^{†} George Pipgras	24	Philadelphia Athletics; New York Yankees	Waite Hoyt^{†}	23	
1929	George Earnshaw	24	Philadelphia Athletics	Wes Ferrell	21	
1930	Lefty Grove^{†}	28	Philadelphia Athletics	Wes Ferrell	25	
1931	Lefty Grove^{†}	31	Philadelphia Athletics	Wes Ferrell	22	
1932	Alvin Crowder	26	Washington Senators	Lefty Grove^{†}	25	
1933	Alvin Crowder; Lefty Grove^{†}	24	Washington Senators; Philadelphia Athletics	Earl Whitehill	22	
1934	Lefty Gomez^{†}	26	New York Yankees	Schoolboy Rowe	24	
1935	Wes Ferrell	25	Boston Red Sox	Mel Harder	22	
1936	Tommy Bridges	23	Detroit Tigers	Vern Kennedy	21	
1937	Lefty Gomez^{†}	21	New York Yankees	Red Ruffing^{†}	20	
1938	Red Ruffing^{†}	21	New York Yankees	Bobo Newsom	20	
1939	Bob Feller^{†}	24	Cleveland Indians	Red Ruffing^{†}	21	
1940	Bob Feller^{†}	27	Cleveland Indians	Bobo Newsom	21	
1941	Bob Feller^{†}	25	Cleveland Indians	Thornton Lee	22	
1942	Tex Hughson	22	Boston Red Sox	Tiny Bonham	21	
1943	Spud Chandler; Dizzy Trout	20	New York Yankees; Detroit Tigers	Early Wynn^{†}	18	
1944	Hal Newhouser^{†}	29	Detroit Tigers	Dizzy Trout	27	
1945	Hal Newhouser^{†}	25	Detroit Tigers	Dave Ferriss	21	
1946	Bob Feller^{†} Hal Newhouser^{†}	26	Cleveland Indians; Detroit Tigers	Dave Ferriss	25	
1947	Bob Feller^{†}	20	Cleveland Indians	Phil Marchildon; Allie Reynolds	19	
1948	Hal Newhouser^{†}	21	Detroit Tigers	Gene Bearden; Bob Lemon^{†}	20	
1949	Mel Parnell	25	Boston Red Sox	Ellis Kinder	23	
1950	Bob Lemon^{†}	23	Cleveland Indians	Vic Raschi	21	
1951	Bob Feller^{†}	22	Cleveland Indians	Ed Lopat; Vic Raschi	21	
1952	Bobby Shantz	24	Philadelphia Athletics	Early Wynn^{†}	23	
1953	Bob Porterfield	22	Washington Senators	Bob Lemon^{†} Mel Parnell	21	
1954	Bob Lemon^{†} Early Wynn^{†}	23	Cleveland Indians; Cleveland Indians	Bob Grim	20	
1955	Whitey Ford^{†} Bob Lemon^{†} Frank Sullivan	18	New York Yankees; Cleveland Indians; Boston Red Sox	Bob Turley; Early Wynn^{†}	17	
1956	Frank Lary	21	Detroit Tigers	Billy Hoeft; Bob Lemon^{†} Billy Pierce; Herb Score; Early Wynn^{†}	20	
1957	Jim Bunning^{†} Billy Pierce	20	Detroit Tigers; Chicago White Sox	Tom Brewer; Dick Donovan; Tom Sturdivant	16	
1958	Bob Turley	21	New York Yankees	Billy Pierce	17	
1959	Early Wynn^{†}	22	Chicago White Sox	Cal McLish	19	
1960	Chuck Estrada; Jim Perry	18	Baltimore Orioles; Cleveland Indians	Bud Daley	16	
1961	Whitey Ford^{†}	25	New York Yankees	Frank Lary	23	
1962	Ralph Terry	23	New York Yankees	Dick Donovan; Ray Herbert; Camilo Pascual	20	
1963	Whitey Ford^{†}	24	New York Yankees	Jim Bouton; Camilo Pascual	21	
1964	Dean Chance; Gary Peters	20	Los Angeles Angels; Chicago White Sox	Wally Bunker; Juan Pizarro; Dave Wickersham	19	
1965	Mudcat Grant	21	Minnesota Twins	Mel Stottlemyre	20	
1966	Jim Kaat^{†}	25	Minnesota Twins	Denny McLain	20	
1967	Jim Lonborg; Earl Wilson	22	Boston Red Sox; Detroit Tigers	Dean Chance	20	
1968	Denny McLain	31	Detroit Tigers	Dave McNally	22	
1969	Denny McLain	24	Detroit Tigers	Mike Cuellar	23	
1970	Mike Cuellar; Dave McNally; Jim Perry	24	Baltimore Orioles; Baltimore Orioles; Minnesota Twins	Clyde Wright	22	
1971	Mickey Lolich	25	Detroit Tigers	Vida Blue	24	
1972	Gaylord Perry^{†} Wilbur Wood	24	Cleveland Indians; Chicago White Sox	Mickey Lolich	22	
1973	Wilbur Wood	24	Chicago White Sox	Joe Coleman	23	
1974	Catfish Hunter^{†} Ferguson Jenkins^{†}	25	Oakland Athletics; Texas Rangers	Steve Busby; Mike Cuellar; Nolan Ryan^{†} Luis Tiant	22	
1975	Catfish Hunter^{†} Jim Palmer^{†}	23	New York Yankees; Baltimore Orioles	Vida Blue	22	
1976	Jim Palmer^{†}	22	Baltimore Orioles	Luis Tiant	21	
1977	Dave Goltz; Dennis Leonard; Jim Palmer^{†}	20	Minnesota Twins; Kansas City Royals; Baltimore Orioles	Nolan Ryan^{†}	19	
1978	Ron Guidry	25	New York Yankees	Mike Caldwell	22	
1979	Mike Flanagan	23	Baltimore Orioles	Tommy John	21	
1980	Steve Stone	25	Baltimore Orioles	Tommy John; Mike Norris	22	
1981	Dennis Martínez; Steve McCatty; Jack Morris^{†} Pete Vuckovich	14	Baltimore Orioles; Oakland Athletics; Detroit Tigers; Milwaukee Brewers	Dennis Leonard; Scott McGregor	13	
1982	LaMarr Hoyt	19	Chicago White Sox	Larry Gura; Pete Vuckovich; Geoff Zahn	18	
1983	LaMarr Hoyt	24	Chicago White Sox	Richard Dotson	22	
1984	Mike Boddicker	20	Baltimore Orioles	Bert Blyleven^{†} Jack Morris^{†}	19	
1985	Ron Guidry	22	New York Yankees	Bret Saberhagen	20	
1986	Roger Clemens	24	Boston Red Sox	Jack Morris^{†}	21	
1987	Roger Clemens; Dave Stewart	20	Boston Red Sox; Oakland Athletics	Mark Langston	19	
1988	Frank Viola	24	Minnesota Twins	Dave Stewart	21	
1989	Bret Saberhagen	23	Kansas City Royals	Dave Stewart	21	
1990	Bob Welch	27	Oakland Athletics	Dave Stewart	22	
1991	Scott Erickson; Bill Gullickson	20	Minnesota Twins; Detroit Tigers	Mark Langston	19	
1992	Kevin Brown; Jack Morris^{†}	21	Texas Rangers; Toronto Blue Jays	Jack McDowell	20	
1993	Jack McDowell	22	Chicago White Sox	Pat Hentgen; Randy Johnson^{†}	19	
1994	Jimmy Key	17	New York Yankees	David Cone; Mike Mussina^{†}	16	
1995	Mike Mussina^{†}	19	Baltimore Orioles	David Cone; Randy Johnson^{†}	18	
1996	Andy Pettitte	21	New York Yankees	Pat Hentgen	20	
1997	Roger Clemens	21	Toronto Blue Jays	Randy Johnson^{†} Brad Radke	20	
1998	Roger Clemens; David Cone; Rick Helling	20	Toronto Blue Jays; New York Yankees; Texas Rangers	Pedro Martínez^{†} Aaron Sele	19	
1999	Pedro Martínez^{†}	23	Boston Red Sox	Bartolo Colón; Mike Mussina^{†} Aaron Sele	18	
2000	Tim Hudson; David Wells	20	Oakland Athletics; Toronto Blue Jays	Andy Pettitte	19	
2001	Mark Mulder	21	Oakland Athletics	Roger Clemens; Jamie Moyer	20	
2002	Barry Zito	23	Oakland Athletics	Derek Lowe	21	
2003	Roy Halladay^{†}	22	Toronto Blue Jays	Esteban Loaiza; Jamie Moyer; Andy Pettitte	21	
2004	Curt Schilling	21	Boston Red Sox	Johan Santana	20	
2005	Bartolo Colón	21	Los Angeles Angels of Anaheim	Jon Garland; Cliff Lee	18	
2006	Johan Santana; Chien-Ming Wang	19	Minnesota Twins; New York Yankees	Jon Garland	18	
2007	Josh Beckett	20	Boston Red Sox	Fausto Carmona; John Lackey; CC Sabathia^{†} Chien-Ming Wang	19	
2008	Cliff Lee	22	Cleveland Indians	Roy Halladay^{†} Mike Mussina^{†}	20	
2009	Félix Hernández; CC Sabathia^{†} Justin Verlander	19	Seattle Mariners; New York Yankees; Detroit Tigers	Josh Beckett; Scott Feldman; Roy Halladay^{†}	17	
2010	CC Sabathia^{†}	21	New York Yankees	Jon Lester; David Price	19	
2011	Justin Verlander	24	Detroit Tigers	CC Sabathia^{†}	19	
2012	David Price; Jered Weaver	20	Tampa Bay Rays; Los Angeles Angels of Anaheim	Matt Harrison	18	
2013	Max Scherzer	21	Detroit Tigers	Bartolo Colón	18	
2014	Corey Kluber; Max Scherzer; Jered Weaver	18	Cleveland Indians; Detroit Tigers; Los Angeles Angels of Anaheim	Wei-Yin Chen; Phil Hughes; Jon Lester; Matt Shoemaker	16	
2015	Dallas Keuchel	20	Houston Astros	Collin McHugh	19	
2016	Rick Porcello	22	Boston Red Sox	J. A. Happ	20	
2017	Carlos Carrasco; Corey Kluber; Jason Vargas	18	Cleveland Indians; Cleveland Indians; Kansas City Royals	Trevor Bauer; Drew Pomeranz; Chris Sale	17	
2018	Blake Snell	21	Tampa Bay Rays	Corey Kluber	20	
2019	Justin Verlander	21	Houston Astros	Gerrit Cole	20	
2020	Shane Bieber	8	Cleveland Indians	Gerrit Cole; Marco Gonzales	7	
2021	Gerrit Cole	16	New York Yankees	Chris Flexen; Steven Matz; Hyun-jin Ryu	14	
2022	Justin Verlander	18	Houston Astros	Framber Valdez	17	
2023	Chris Bassitt; Zach Eflin	16	Toronto Blue Jays; Tampa Bay Rays	Gerrit Cole; Kyle Gibson	15	
2024	Tarik Skubal	18	Detroit Tigers	José Berríos; Seth Lugo; Carlos Rodón	16	
2025	Max Fried	19	New York Yankees	Garrett Crochet; Carlos Rodón	18	
2026	Sonny Gray	18	Boston Red Sox	Drew Rasmussen	16	

== Other major leagues ==
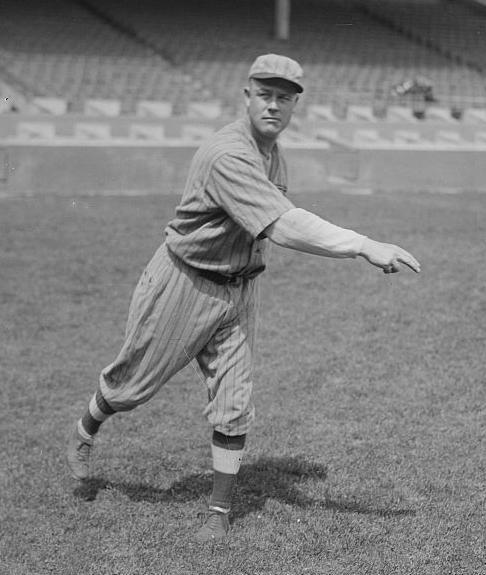
Claude Hendrix led the Federal League with 29 wins in its inaugural season.

Year	Leader	W	Team	League	Runner-up	W	Ref
1882	Will White	40	Cincinnati Red Stockings	American Association	Tony Mullane	30	
1883	Will White	43	Cincinnati Red Stockings	American Association	Tim Keefe^{†}	41	
1884	Guy Hecker	52	Louisville Eclipse	American Association	Tim Keefe^{†} Jack Lynch	37	
1884	Bill Sweeney	40	Baltimore Monumentals	Union Association	Hugh Daily	28	
1885	Bob Caruthers	40	St. Louis Browns	American Association	Ed Morris	39	
1886	Dave Foutz; Ed Morris	41	St. Louis Browns; Pittsburgh Alleghenys	American Association	Toad Ramsey	38	
1887	Matt Kilroy	46	Baltimore Orioles	American Association	Toad Ramsey	37	
1888	Silver King	45	St. Louis Browns	American Association	Ed Seward	35	
1889	Bob Caruthers	40	Brooklyn Bridegrooms	American Association	Silver King	35	
1890	Sadie McMahon	36	Philadelphia Athletics; Baltimore Orioles	American Association	Scott Stratton	34	
1890	Mark Baldwin	33	Chicago Pirates	Players' League	Silver King; Gus Weyhing	30	
1891	Sadie McMahon	35	Baltimore Orioles	American Association	George Haddock	34	
1914	Claude Hendrix	29	Chicago Chi-Feds	Federal League	Jack Quinn	26	
1915	George McConnell	25	Chicago Chi-Feds	Federal League	Frank Allen	23	

== Negro Major Leagues ==
=== Negro National League I ===
Year	Leader	W	Team	Runner-up	W	Ref
1920	Bill Gatewood	15	Detroit Stars	Sam Crawford; Dizzy Dismukes	14	
1921	Dave Brown; Bill Drake	17	Chicago American Giants; St. Louis Giants	Bullet Rogan^{†}	16	
1922	Jim Jeffries	21	Indianapolis ABCs	Bullet Rogan^{†}	14	
1923	Bullet Rogan^{†}	16	Kansas City Monarchs	Andy Cooper^{†} Rube Curry; Ed Rile	15	
1924	Bullet Rogan^{†}	16	Kansas City Monarchs	Sam Streeter	14	
1925	Rosey Davis	16	St. Louis Stars	Bullet Rogan^{†}	15	
1926	Logan Hensley	18	St. Louis Stars	William Bell	15	
1927	Bill Foster^{†}	21	Chicago American Giants	Harry Salmon; Ted Trent	15	
1928	Ted Trent	19	St. Louis Stars	Bill Foster^{†} George Mitchell	13	
1929	John Williams	19	St. Louis Stars	Chet Brewer; Andy Cooper^{†}	15	
1930	Logan Hensley	16	St. Louis Stars	Rosey Davis (baseball); Bill Foster^{†}	11	
1931	Ray Brown^{†} Nelson Dean; George Mitchell	7	Indianapolis ABCs; Detroit Stars; Indianapolis ABCs	Lefty Capers; Luther McDonald	6	

=== Eastern Colored League ===
Year	Leader	W	Team	Runner-up	W	Ref
1923	Rats Henderson; Nip Winters	10	Atlantic City Bacharach Giants; Hilldale Club	Red Ryan	9	
1924	Nip Winters	20	Hilldale Club	Dave Brown; Red Ryan	13	
1925	Nip Winters	17	Hilldale Club	Rats Henderson; Bob McClure	15	
1926	Nip Winters	17	Hilldale Club	Claude Grier	13	
1927	Darltie Cooper; Luther Farrell	16	Harrisburg Giants; Atlantic City Bacharach Giants	Cliff Carter; Nip Winters	13	
1928	Laymon Yokely	12	Baltimore Black Sox	Luther Farrell	9	

=== American Negro League ===
Year	Leader	W	Team	Runner-up	W	Ref
1929	Connie Rector	18	New York Lincoln Giants	Laymon Yokely	17	

=== East–West League ===
Year	Leader	W	Team	Runner-up	W	Ref
1932	Bertrum Hunter	10	Detroit Wolves / Homestead Grays	Ray Brown^{†} Harry Salmon; Ted Trent	7	

=== Negro Southern League ===
Year	Leader	W	Team	Runner-up	W	Ref
1932	Dick Matthews	11	Monroe Monarchs	Barney Morris	10	

=== Negro National League II ===
Year	Leader	W	Team	Runner-up	W	Ref
1933	Bertrum Hunter	11	Akron Grays / Pittsburgh Crawfords	Leroy Matlock; Sam Streeter	10	
1934	Slim Jones	20	Philadelphia Stars	Satchel Paige^{†}	13	
1935	Ray Brown^{†} Leroy Matlock; Webster McDonald	8	Homestead Grays; Pittsburgh Crawfords; Philadelphia Stars	Leon Day^{†} Rocky Ellis; Bertrum Hunter; Bill Jackman	7	
1936	Leroy Matlock	10	Pittsburgh Crawfords	Bill Byrd	9	
1937	Ray Brown^{†}	11	Homestead Grays	Tom Parker; Edsall Walker	7	
1938	Ray Brown^{†}	14	Homestead Grays	Edsall Walker	10	
1939	Henry McHenry	11	Philadelphia Stars	Bill Byrd; Leon Day^{†}	7	
1940	Ray Brown^{†}	17	Homestead Grays	Edsall Walker	13	
1941	Terris McDuffie	11	Homestead Grays	Dave Barnhill; Bill Byrd	9	
1942	Ray Brown^{†} Bill Byrd	10	Homestead Grays; Baltimore Elite Giants	Barney Brown; Leon Day^{†} Eugene Smith	8	
1943	Johnny Wright	18	Homestead Grays	Spoon Carter	14	
1944	Bill Ricks	11	Philadelphia Stars	Ray Brown^{†}	10	
1945	Bill Byrd; Roy Welmaker	11	Baltimore Elite Giants; Homestead Grays	Roy Partlow; Andrew Porter	8	
1946	Leon Day^{†}	13	Newark Eagles	Max Manning	11	
1947	Max Manning	12	Newark Eagles	Bob Romby	10	
1948	Bill Byrd	10	Baltimore Elite Giants	Max Manning	9	

=== Negro American League ===
Year	Leader	W	Team	Runner-up	W	Ref
1937	Hilton Smith^{†}	11	Chicago American Giants / Kansas City Monarchs	Vet Barnes; Jesse Houston	9	
1938	Willie Cornelius; Hilton Smith^{†}	9	Chicago American Giants; Kansas City Monarchs	Felix Evans; Tommy Johnson; Bo Mitchell	6	
1939	Smoky Owens; George Walker	8	Cleveland Bears; Kansas City Monarchs	Frank Bradley	7	
1940	Frank Bradley; Lefty Calhoun; Jack Matchett	6	Kansas City Monarchs; St. Louis–New Orleans Stars; Kansas City Monarchs	Preacher Henry Preacher Henry; Andy Sarvis	5	
1941	Hilton Smith^{†}	9	Kansas City Monarchs	Dan Bankhead; Satchel Paige^{†}	7	
1942	Diamond Pipkins	7	Birmingham Black Barons	Gene Bremer; Bill Jefferson; Jack Matchett; Booker McDaniel; Hilton Smith^{†}	5	
1943	Satchel Paige^{†}	10	Kansas City Monarchs / Memphis Red Sox	Booker McDaniel	8	
1944	Verdell Mathis	7	Memphis Red Sox	Satchel Paige^{†}	6	
1945	Booker McDaniel	9	Kansas City Monarchs	Gene Bremer; Jim LaMarque	7	
1946	Connie Johnson (baseball); Steve Wylie	5	Kansas City Monarchs	Jim LaMarque; Satchel Paige^{†} Hilton Smith^{†}	4	
1947	Jim LaMarque	10	Kansas City Monarchs	Hilton Smith^{†}	7	
1948	Jim LaMarque	9	Kansas City Monarchs	Jimmy Newberry	6	

== Footnotes ==
- ^{a} Recognized "major leagues" include the current American and National Leagues and several defunct leagues—the American Association, the Federal League, the Players' League, and the Union Association.
- ^{b} A pitcher must throw a minimum of one inning per game scheduled for his team during the season (typically 162 innings; shortened by the COVID pandemic to 60 innings in 2020) to qualify for the win title.
