= East–West League =

American Negro baseball league

- Classification: Major league
- Sport: Negro league baseball
- First season: 1932
- Folded: 1932
- No. of teams: ~8
- Country: United States
- Most titles: Detroit Wolves

The East–West League was an American Negro baseball league that operated during the period when professional baseball in the United States was segregated. Cum Posey organized the league in 1932, but it did not last the full year and folded in June of that year. It was the first Negro league to include teams from both the Eastern and Midwestern United States.

Although the league lasted less than one season, it featured one of the strongest teams in the history of Negro league baseball, the 1932 Detroit Wolves. The league provided a foundation for the development of the second Negro National League, which would become the premier league for African American baseball players.

== League history ==
By early 1932, facing the severe financial problems associated with the Great Depression, the nation no longer had any functioning major Negro leagues. The first Negro National League, which operated primarily in the American Midwest, limped through the 1931 season following the death of its founder, Rube Foster, but formally disbanded in March 1932. In the Eastern states, the Eastern Colored League folded in 1928, and its successor, the American Negro League, folded after the 1929 season.

In this environment, Cum Posey, the owner of the Homestead Grays, undertook an ambitious plan to create a single league that encompassed teams in the East and Midwest. Posey was facing a strong local competitor, Gus Greenlee's Pittsburgh Crawfords, and hoped that a new league would bolster the Grays and isolate the Crawfords. In January 1932, Posey organized the East–West League. The league featured eight teams located in the East and Midwest, at least two of which (Homestead and Detroit) were owned by Posey. The plans for the new league were ambitious relative to the previous Negro leagues. The Al Munro Elias Bureau was hired to compile statistics, and the league would hire salaried, traveling umpires.

The league began play in May, but attendance was poor because of the severe financial conditions of the Depression. Teams soon abandoned the planned schedule and turned to better paying bookings with white semipro teams. Within a month, it was clear that the league could not continue. In June the Detroit Wolves folded, and by early July the league had ceased operations.

The poor financial performance of the league weakened Posey's Grays in their competition against Greenlee's Crawfords. Greenlee recruited a number of Grays star players, including Josh Gibson, Cool Papa Bell, and Oscar Charleston, who joined a Crawfords team anchored by the great pitcher Satchel Paige. In the face of dismal league attendance, by late May Posey invited the Crawfords to join the league and allowed the Grays and other East–West League teams to schedule games with the Crawfords. By the end of the year, Posey's new league was defunct and his Grays were severely weakened.

In the following year, 1933, Greenlee organized a second Negro National League (1933–1948). The Homestead Grays and Baltimore Black Sox of the old East–West League were franchises of the new league, though Homestead was expelled part-way through the season after a dispute. Because initially the new Negro National League operated in both the Eastern and Midwestern regions in many of the same cities as the East–West League, it was sometimes also referred to as the "East–West League." Beginning in 1937, the Negro American League was organized in the Midwest, and the Negro National League was concentrated in the East.

== East–West League franchises and notable players ==
East–West League (1932)
Team	Notable players
Baltimore Black Sox	Dick Lundy (MGR/SS)
Cleveland Stars
Pollock's Cuban Stars
Detroit Wolves	Cool Papa Bell (CF) · William Bell (P) · Ray Brown (P) · Vic Harris (LF) · Mule Suttles (1B) · Quincy Trouppe (RF/C/P) · Willie Wells (SS) · Cyclone Joe Williams (P)
Hilldale Club
Homestead Grays	Newt Allen (2B) · Cool Papa Bell (CF) · Ray Brown (P) · Vic Harris (LF) · Willie Wells (SS) · Cyclone Joe Williams (P) · Jud Wilson (3B)
Newark Browns
Washington Pilots	Chet Brewer (P) · Rap Dixon (RF) · Mule Suttles (1B)

== Playing results ==
=== Standings ===
vs. East–West League						vs. Major Black teams			
East–West League	W	L	T	Pct.	GB	W	L	T	Pct.
Detroit Wolves	20	5	0	.800	—	28	9	0	.757
Homestead Grays	19	11	1	.629	3½	44	33	1	.571
Baltimore Black Sox	24	17	0	.585	4	36	33	0	.522
Pollock's Cuban Stars	11	13	0	.458	8½	22	21	0	.512
Hilldale Club	11	16	0	.407	10	11	21	0	.344
Washington Pilots	13	22	0	.371	12	24	41	0	.369
Cleveland Stars	5	13	1	.289	11½	11	16	1	.411
Newark Browns	0	6	0	.000	10½	0	6	0	.000

Locations of teams for the 1932 East–West League season
East–West League
Traveling team: Pollock's Cuban Stars

=== Team and individual performances ===
Because the league folded before the end of the season, no team was declared a champion. Statistics compiled by John B. Holway, which include some non-league games, show the Detroit Wolves with the best record in the league.

The Wolves, owned by Posey who also owned the Homestead Grays, drew many of their players from the Kansas City Monarchs and the St. Louis Stars. Their roster included Cool Papa Bell, Ray Brown, Mule Suttles, Willie Wells, and Cyclone Joe Williams, while their pitcher/manager was Dizzy Dismukes. Despite a strong winning record, the Wolves were disbanded due to poor attendance. As a result, many of the players were reassigned to the Homestead Grays.

According to Holway, the batting champion was catcher Bill Perkins, who hit .449 for Homestead and .408 overall, including his games played for the non-league Pittsburgh. Besides, Suttles led the league teams with 9 home runs, though three players with non-league Pittsburgh hit more (Rap Dixon with 11 HR and Josh Gibson and Oscar Charleston each with 10). In addition, Suttles led in home run rate with 31 HR per 550 AB.

The top league pitchers were Harry Salmon (14–6 with Homestead) and Bertrum Hunter (12–4 with Detroit), with Satchel Paige of non-league Pittsburgh holding the overall lead in wins with a 21–9 record.
