= Provine Bradley =

American baseball player

- Pitcher / Second baseman / Left fielder
- Born: October 22, 1907; Sibley, Louisiana, U.S.
- Died: December 31, 1986 (aged 79); Greenwood, Mississippi, U.S.
- Batted: Unknown Threw: Right

Negro league baseball debut
- 1937, for the Cincinnati Tigers

Last appearance
- 1938, for the Memphis Red Sox
- Stats at Baseball Reference

Teams
- Cincinnati Tigers (1937); Memphis Red Sox (1938)

Provine Bradley (October 22, 1907 – December 31, 1986) was an American professional baseball player in the Negro leagues. He played with the Cincinnati Tigers in 1937 and the Memphis Red Sox in 1938. In some sources, his career is combined with that of Frank Bradley.
