= Charles Williams (baseball) =

American baseball player

- Pitcher
- Born: September 24, 1894; Tanners, Virginia, U.S.
- Died: April 26, 1952 (aged 57); Homestead, Pennsylvania, U.S.
- Batted: Left Threw: Left

Negro league baseball debut
- 1921, for the Homestead Grays

Last appearance
- 1935, for the Homestead Grays

Teams
- Homestead Grays (1921–1922, 1924, 1926–1935); Detroit Wolves (1932)

Charles Henry Williams (September 24, 1894 – April 26, 1952), nicknamed "Lefty", was an American Negro league pitcher in the 1920s and 1930s.

A native of Tanners, Virginia, Williams made his Negro leagues debut in 1921 for the Homestead Grays. Except for a short stint with the Detroit Wolves in 1932, he played his entire career with the Grays, with his final appearance coming in the 1935 season. Williams died in Homestead, Pennsylvania in 1952 at age 57.
