= Bertrum Hunter =

American baseball player (1910–1948)

Bertram Hunter
- Pitcher
- Born: October 20, 1910; Phoenix, Arizona, U.S.
- Died: April 25, 1948 (aged 37); Villahermosa, Tabasco, Mexico
- Batted: Right Threw: Right

Negro league baseball debut
- 1931, for the St. Louis Stars

Last appearance
- 1936, for the Philadelphia Stars
- Stats at Baseball Reference

Teams
- St. Louis Stars (1931); Homestead Grays (1932); Detroit Wolves (1932); Kansas City Monarchs (1932); Akron Grays (1933); Pittsburgh Crawfords (1933–1936); New York Cubans (1936); Philadelphia Stars (1936); Gallos de Santa Rosa (1941); Rojos del Aguila de Veracruz (1941); Angeles de Puebla (1942); Alijadores de Tampico (1943); Azules de Veracruz (1943); Angeles de Puebla (1943); Diablos Rojos del Mexico (1944)

Career highlights and awards
- East–West League wins leader (1932); Negro National League wins leader (1933); East–West League strikeout leader (1932)

Bertrum "Nate" Hunter (October 20, 1910 – April 25, 1948) was an American professional baseball pitcher in the Negro leagues and the Mexican League. He played professionally from 1931 to 1936 with several teams. He pitched for the East in the inaugural East-West All-Star Game in 1933. Hunter played in Mexico, after his negro league career, until 1944.
