= John Henry Russell (baseball) =

American baseball player

- Second baseman
- Born: February 24, 1898; Dolcito, Alabama, U.S.
- Died: December 4, 1972 (aged 74); Cleveland, Ohio, U.S.
- Batted: Right Threw: Right

Negro league baseball debut
- 1923, for the Memphis Red Sox

Last appearance
- 1934, for the Homestead Grays

Teams
- Memphis Red Sox (1923–1925); St. Louis Stars (1926–1930); Indianapolis ABCs (1931); Pittsburgh Crawfords (1931–1933); Cleveland Red Sox (1934); Homestead Grays (1934)

John Henry Russell (February 24, 1898 – December 4, 1972), nicknamed "Pistol", was an American Negro league second baseman in the 1920s and 1930s.

A native of Dolcito, Alabama (a former community in Jefferson County), Russell made his Negro leagues debut in 1923 with the Memphis Red Sox. After three years with Memphis, he spent the following five seasons with the St. Louis Stars, and contributed six hits and two RBIs in the Stars' 1928 Negro National League championship series victory over the Chicago American Giants. While representing the Pittsburgh Crawfords, Russell laid down a successful suicide squeeze bunt in the 1933 East–West All-Star Game. He died in Cleveland, Ohio in 1972 at age 74.
