= Smokey Joe Williams =

American baseball player (1886–1951)

Joe Williams
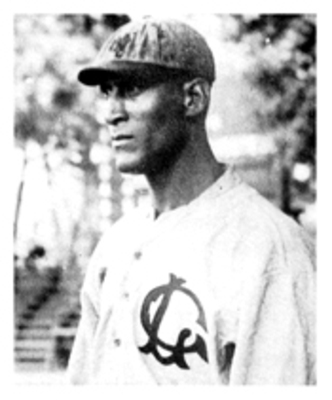
- Williams in 1917
- Pitcher / Manager
- Born: April 6, 1886; Seguin, Texas, U.S.
- Died: February 25, 1951 (aged 64); New York City, New York, U.S.
- Batted: Right Threw: Right

Negro leagues debut
- 1907, for the San Antonio Black Bronchos

Last Negro leagues appearance
- 1932, for the Detroit Wolves

Negro leagues (Note: On December 16, 2020, Major League Baseball declared certain Negro leagues, from the span of 1920–1948, to be "Major League". Williams's statistics reflect his time in the Negro leagues from 1923 to 1924, 1929, and 1932.) statistics
- Win–loss record: 16–19
- Earned run average: 3.51
- Strikeouts: 201
- Managerial record: 18–23
- Winning percentage: .439
- Managerial record at Baseball Reference

Teams
- As player: San Antonio Black Bronchos (1907–1909); Chicago Giants (1910); New York Lincoln Giants (1911–1923); Schenectady Mohawk Giants (1913); Chicago American Giants (1914); Breakers Hotel (1915–1916); Atlantic City Bacharach Giants (1916); Hilldale Club (1917); Brooklyn Royal Giants (1924); Homestead Grays (1925–1932); Detroit Wolves (1932); As manager: New York Lincoln Giants (1923)

Career highlights and awards
- Pitched a no-hitter on May 4, 1919 in Harlem

Member of the National

Baseball Hall of Fame
- Induction: 1999
- Election method: Veterans Committee

Joseph Williams (April 6, 1886 – February 25, 1951), nicknamed "Cyclone Joe" and "Smokey Joe", was an American right-handed pitcher in Negro league baseball. He is considered one of the greatest pitchers of all-time and was elected to the National Baseball Hall of Fame in 1999.

== Baseball career ==
Williams was born in Seguin, Texas. One of his parents was African American, and the other was a Comanche Native American. Williams grew up to become an outstanding pitcher, but as his path to the major leagues was barred by the color line, he spent his entire 27-year career (1905–1932) pitching in the Negro leagues, Mexico, and the Caribbean.

Williams entered professional baseball in 1907 with the San Antonio Black Bronchos and was an immediate star, posting records of 28-4, 15-9, 20-8, 20-2, and 32-8. After that, the Chicago Giants, a team higher in the pecking order of black baseball, acquired him. In 1910, the Giants owner Frank Leland pronounced him the best pitcher in baseball, in any league.

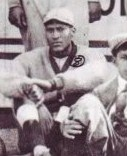
Williams in 1912

In 1911, Williams joined the Lincoln Giants of New York, helping that club become one of the premier African-American teams of the era. In 1913, he took part in a "Championship Series" that matched up them against the team considered the best of the West in the Chicago American Giants. From July 18 to August 13, the two teams played fourteen games with each other. He had a decision in Games 1, 3, 4, 5, 8, 10, 11, winning five of the eight appearances as the Lincoln Giants won eight of fourteen games in the Series. In Game 5, he hit a home run. When manager John Henry Lloyd departed in 1914, Williams took over as player-manager, a post he held through the 1923 season. After the Lincolns finished an ignominious fifth (out of six teams) in the Eastern Colored League's inaugural season, Williams was released in the spring of 1924.

Williams joined the Brooklyn Royal Giants for a season, then signed with the independent Homestead Grays, where, except for a brief turn with the Detroit Wolves in 1932, he spent the rest of his career in top-level black baseball. In 1929, playing for the Grays in the American Negro League at the age of 43, Williams won 12 games and lost seven.

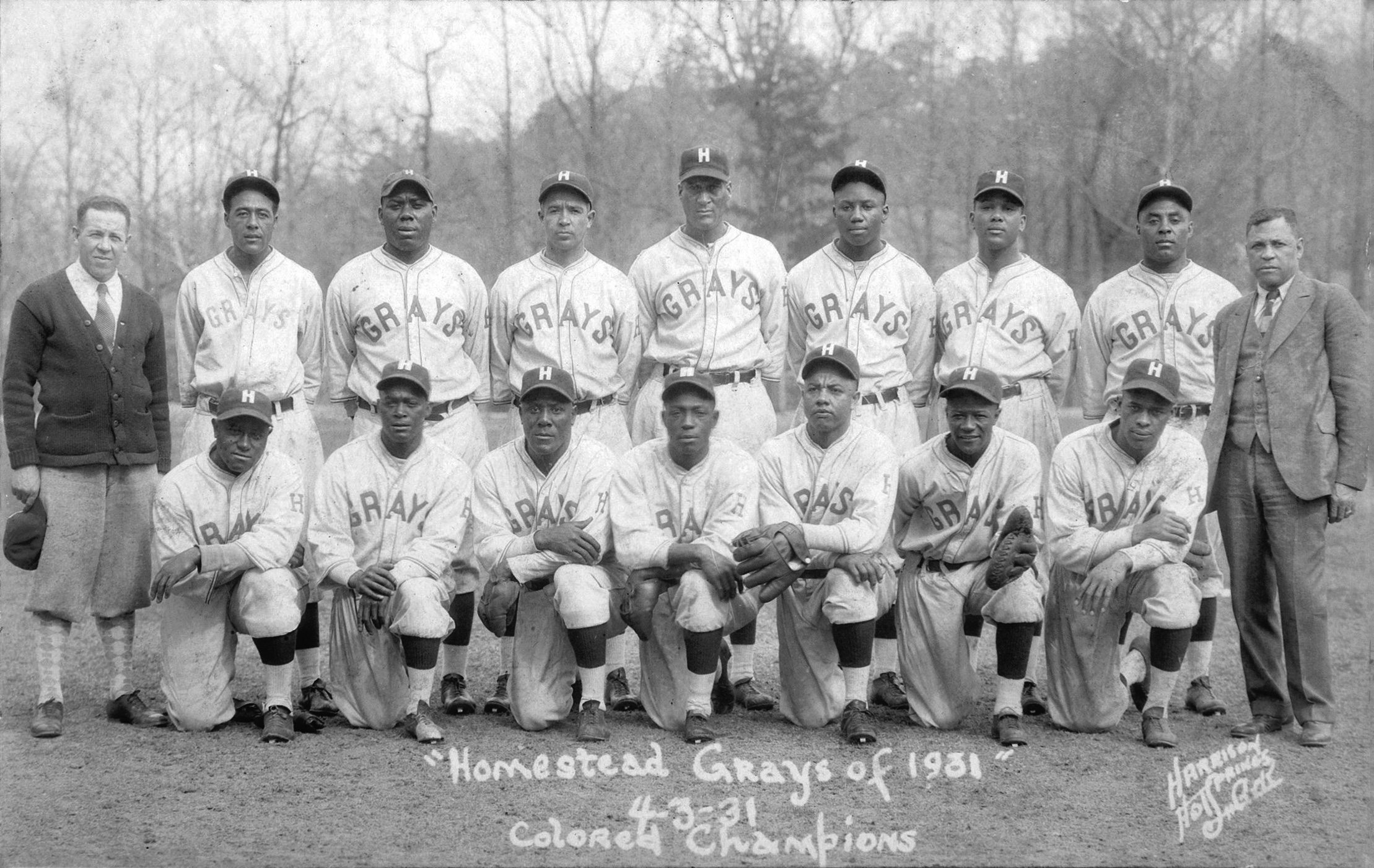
Williams (standing, center) with the 1931 Homestead Grays

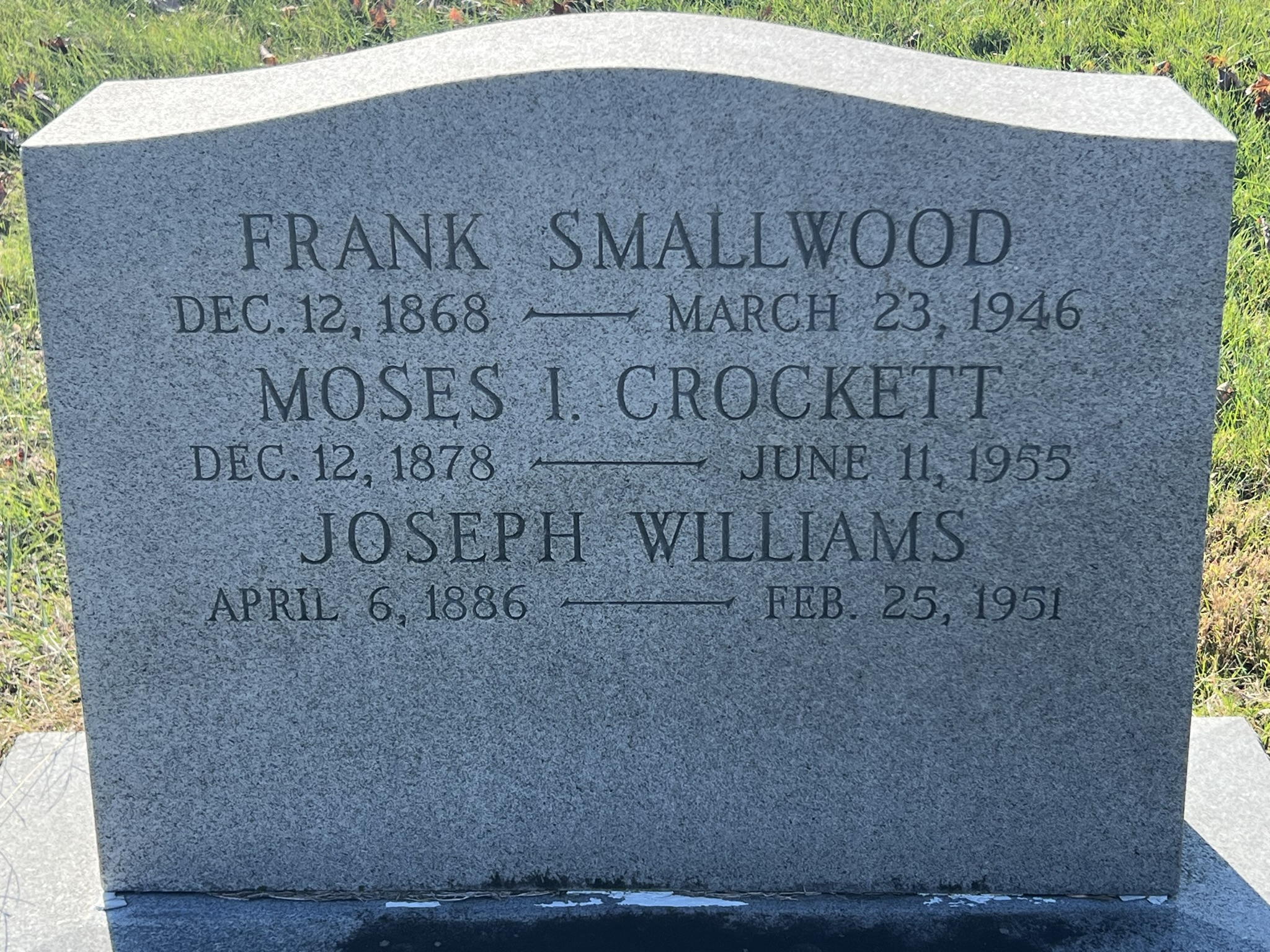
Joseph Williams grave marker

On August 2, 1930, at age 44, Williams struck out 27 Kansas City Monarchs in a 1–0, 12-inning, one-hit night game victory. His mound opponent, Chet Brewer, struck out 19 men. That same year, he beat a younger Negro league star who was just bursting into superstardom, Satchel Paige, also by 1–0, in their only meeting against each other. Williams retired from baseball two years later.

Although barred from the major leagues, Williams pitched many games against major league stars in postseason barnstorming exhibitions. He proved to be as tough against them as he was against the Negro leaguers, posting a 20–7 record in these games. Among his victims were Hall of Famers Grover Cleveland Alexander, Walter Johnson, Chief Bender, Rube Marquard, and Waite Hoyt. Three different times, he faced the eventual National League champions. He won two of those games and lost the third, 1-0 to the 1917 New York Giants despite throwing a no-hitter. Ty Cobb stated Williams was “a sure 30-game winner in the major leagues”.

During Williams' years in New York, he acquired the nickname "Cyclone Joe", or simply "Cyclone", frequently being listed in box scores solely by that name. After joining the Homestead Grays in the late 1920s, his nickname became "Smokey Joe", and the older "Cyclone" appellation was rarely used after that.

Williams played winter baseball with a Palm Beach, Florida team for more than 20 years during his active career.

== Family ==
Williams married Beatrice A. Johnson on March 22, 1922, in New York City. Upon retiring from baseball in the late 1930s, Williams became a bartender and continued this until his death from a heart ailment. Beatrice Williams survived him.

Williams is interred at Lincoln Memorial Cemetery, a historic African American cemetery in Suitland, Maryland. He is buried in a grave shared with his wife's mother and step-father.

== Legacy ==
In 1950, there was a "Smokey Joe Williams Day" at the Polo Grounds. The following year, Williams died at age 64 in New York City.

Considerable debate existed and still exists over whether Williams or Paige was the greatest of the Negro league pitchers. Most modern sources lean toward Paige, but in 1952, a poll taken by the Pittsburgh Courier named Williams the greatest pitcher in Negro league history.

In 1999, after extensive research on the early years of black baseball revealed his outstanding record, Williams was elected to the National Baseball Hall of Fame. In the 2001 book The New Bill James Historical Baseball Abstract, writer Bill James ranked Williams as the 52nd greatest player in baseball history, behind Sandy Koufax and ahead of Roy Campanella. This would rank Williams as the 12th greatest pitcher, behind Koufax and ahead of Bob Feller.

== Quotes ==
“The important thing is that the long fight against the ban has been lifted. I praise the Lord I’ve lived to see the day.”
