= Frank Bradley (baseball) =

American baseball player (1918–2002)

- Pitcher
- Born: February 3, 1918; Benton, Louisiana, U.S.
- Died: December 2, 2002 (aged 84); Benton, Louisiana, U.S.
- Batted: Right Threw: Right

Negro league baseball debut
- 1937, for the Kansas City Monarchs

Last appearance
- 1942, for the Kansas City Monarchs
- Stats at Baseball Reference

Teams
- Kansas City Monarchs (1937–1942)

Frank E. Bradley (February 3, 1918 – December 2, 2002) was an American Negro league pitcher between 1937 and 1942.

A native of Benton, Louisiana, Bradley made his Negro leagues debut in 1937 with the Kansas City Monarchs. He played six seasons with Kansas City through 1942. Bradley died in Benton in 2002 at age 84. In some sources, his career is combined with that of Provine Bradley.
