= Mule Suttles =

American baseball player (1901–1966)

- First baseman / Left fielder / Manager
- Born: March 31, 1901; Edgewater, Alabama, U.S.
- Died: July 9, 1966 (aged 65); Newark, New Jersey, U.S.
- Batted: Right Threw: Right

Negro leagues debut
- 1921, for the Atlantic City Bacharach Giants

Last Negro leagues appearance
- 1944, for the Newark Eagles

Negro leagues (Note: On December 16, 2020, Major League Baseball declared certain Negro leagues, from the span of 1920–1948, to be "Major League". Suttles' statistics reflect his time in the Negro leagues from 1924 until the end of his career.) statistics
- Batting average: .339
- Home runs: 180
- Runs batted in: 883
- Managerial record: 58–67
- Winning %: .464
- Stats at Baseball Reference
- Managerial record at Baseball Reference

Teams
- As player: Atlantic City Bacharach Giants (1921); Birmingham Black Barons (1923–1925); St. Louis Stars (1926–1931); Chicago American Giants (1929); Baltimore Black Sox (1930); Detroit Wolves (1932); Washington Pilots (1932); Chicago American Giants (1933–1935); Newark Eagles (1936–1940); New York Black Yankees (1941); Newark Eagles (1942–1944); As manager: Newark Eagles (1943–1944)

Career highlights and awards
- 5× All-Star (1933, 1934, 1935, 1937, 1939); 2× Negro National League batting champion (1926, 1928); Triple Crown (1926)

Member of the National

Baseball Hall of Fame
- Induction: 2006
- Election method: Committee on African-American Baseball

George "Mule" Suttles (March 31, 1901 – July 9, 1966) was an American first baseman, left fielder and player-manager in Negro league baseball, most prominently with the Birmingham Black Barons, St. Louis Stars and Newark Eagles. Best known for his power hitting, Suttles was elected to the Baseball Hall of Fame in 2006.

== Negro league career ==
Born in Edgewater, Alabama, Suttles played one game for the Atlantic City Bacharach Giants in 1921, and broke into the Negro National League in 1923 with the Birmingham Black Barons. Suttles was renowned for hitting for power as well as batting average. In five years with the Stars (1926–1930), he led the league in home runs twice and in doubles, triples, and batting average once each. His 1926 season was the fifth time in league history that a player won the batting Triple Crown.

Suttles' final seasons were spent playing first base for the Newark Eagles' "Million Dollar Infield" with Dick Seay at second, Willie Wells at shortstop, and Ray Dandridge at third. He also managed, and was highly respected. He is one of nine players to have won multiple league batting titles.

== East–West games ==
In five East–West All-Star Games, he batted .412 with an .883 slugging percentage. He also hit the first ever home run in the history of the east–west game.

== Career totals ==
In 26 documented exhibition games against white competition, Suttles hit .374 with five home runs. He hit .329 with 179 home runs in Negro League competition, the latter number second on the all-time list in Negro League play, behind only Turkey Stearnes.

== Legacy ==
Suttles, who stood 5 ft 11 in (1.80 m), weighed in at 195 lbs, and used a 50-ounce bat, was known for his power, including several 500+ foot homers; a game against the Memphis Red Sox in which he blasted three homers in a single inning, and a home run at Havana, Cuba's Tropicana Park that flew over a 60-foot (18 m) high center field fence and landed in the ocean. Willie Wells saw the homer and remarked, "He hit this damn ball so far it looked like we were playing in a lot; it didn't look like no ball park." It was because of Suttles' strength that he got his nickname, and late in games when a big hit was needed his teammates would encourage him with cries of, "Kick, Mule!"

Clarence Isreal, an Eagles player, was quoted as saying, "He was considered my dad. Suttles was the most gentle person I ever saw."

In 2001, writer Bill James ranked Suttles as the 43rd-greatest baseball player of all-time and the second-best left fielder in the Negro leagues.

In 2024, Suttles was officially recognized as the 4th greatest all-time slugger when the Negro League statistics were incorporated into the MLB records, far surpassing Mark McGwire and also relegating Barry Bonds to 8th place.

== Death ==
Suttles died of cancer in Newark, New Jersey, at age 65. Lenny Pearson, who played with and for Suttles, recalled in John Holway's book Blackball Stars: "He told us, 'When I die, have a little thought for my memory, but don't mourn me too much.'"

Suttles was interred in Glendale Cemetery in Bloomfield, New Jersey.
