= Dizzy Dismukes =

American baseball player (born 1890-1861)

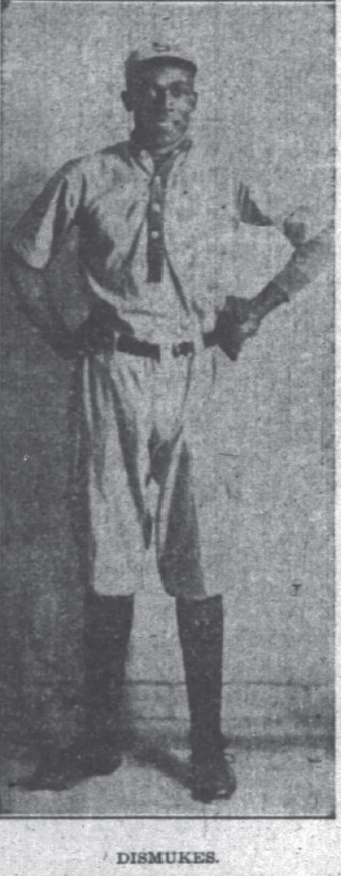
- Pitcher / Manager
- Born: March 15, 1890; Birmingham, Alabama, U.S.
- Died: June 30, 1961 (aged 71); Campbell, Ohio, U.S.
- Batted: Right Threw: Right

Negro leagues debut
- 1909, for the Indianapolis ABCs

Last Negro leagues appearance
- 1932, for the Detroit Wolves

Negro leagues (Note: On December 16, 2020, Major League Baseball declared certain Negro leagues, from the span of 1920–1948, to be "Major League". Dismukes' statistics reflect his time in the Negro leagues from 1920–1927, 1932–1933, and 1937–1938.) statistics
- Win–loss record: 32–29
- Earned run average: 4.32
- Strikeouts: 186
- Managerial record: 199–280–6
- Winning percentage: .415
- Stats at Baseball Reference
- Managerial record at Baseball Reference

Teams
- As player: Indianapolis ABCs (1909); West Baden Sprudels (1910–1911); St. Louis Giants (1912–1913); Brooklyn Royal Giants (1913–1914); Lincoln Stars (1914); Indianapolis ABCs (1915–1918); Dayton Marcos (1918–1919); Indianapolis ABCs (1920–1921); Pittsburgh Keystones (1921–1922); Indianapolis ABCs (1923–1924); Homestead Grays (1924); Birmingham Black Barons (1924); Memphis Red Sox (1925); St. Louis Stars (1926–1927); Detroit Wolves (1932); As manager: Dayton Marcos (1918); Pittsburgh Keystones (1922); Indianapolis ABCs (1923–1924); Birmingham Black Barons (1924); Memphis Red Sox (1925); St. Louis Stars (1926); Detroit Wolves (1932); Columbus Blue Birds (1933); St. Louis Stars (1937); Birmingham Black Barons (1938)

Career highlights and awards
- Pitched a No-Hitter May 9, 1915 in Indianapolis, Indiana

William "Dizzy" Dismukes (March 15, 1890 – June 30, 1961) was an American pitcher and manager in Negro league baseball and during the pre-Negro league years. He was born in Birmingham, Alabama, where his father Isaac Lee Dismukes was a deacon in a Baptist church, and his mother Sallie taught Sunday School. He knew from the time he was a youth that baseball was his first love, and he dropped out of school to follow his dream of becoming a baseball player.

== Career ==
Dismukes was a right-handed submariner, who is considered by many historians to be one of the best pitchers in the Negro leagues.

Born and raised in Birmingham, Alabama, he began his baseball career at age 17.

Among his achievements as a pitcher, he defeated the then-major league champion Pittsburgh Pirates 2–1, in an exhibition game in 1911.

While a player, he periodically wrote about baseball for such black newspapers as the Pittsburgh Courier, beginning in the 1920s.

Among the teams he played for were the Brooklyn (NY) Royal Giants, Indianapolis ABCs and the St. Louis Stars.

During his managing years, Dismukes became known for his excellent memory during his playing and managing, and became known as a strategist. He is credited with teaching Webster McDonald and Carl Mays the tricks of submarine-style pitching.

He spent a number of years with the Kansas City Monarchs, in such roles as traveling secretary and business manager. Later in his career, after major league baseball was integrated, he was a scout for the Chicago Cubs and then the New York Yankees.

He joined the Yankees as a scout in 1953, having resigned his position as secretary of the Kansas City Monarchs.

He died in 1961, at age 71, at the home of his sister in Campbell, Ohio; the cause of death was hardening of the arteries.

At age 62, Dismukes received votes listing him on the 1952 Pittsburgh Courier player-voted poll of the Negro leagues' best players ever.
