= Ted Trent =

- Pitcher
- Born: December 17, 1903; Jacksonville, Florida, U.S.
- Died: January 10, 1944 (aged 40); Chicago, Illinois, U.S.
- Batted: Right Threw: Right

Negro league baseball debut
- 1927, for the St. Louis Stars

Last appearance
- 1939, for the Chicago American Giants

Teams
- San Antonio Black Bears (1920); St. Louis Stars (1927–1931); Cuban Stars (West) (1930); Homestead Grays (1932); Detroit Wolves (1932); Washington Pilots (1932); New York Black Yankees (1933–1934); Chicago American Giants (1934–1939)

Theodore Trent (December 17, 1903 – January 10, 1944) was an American professional baseball pitcher in the Negro leagues. He played from 1927 to 1939 with several teams, playing mostly for the St. Louis Stars and Chicago American Giants. Trent was considered the best pitcher on the St. Louis Stars, when the team won three pennants from 1927 to 1931. He was nicknamed Highpockets, Stringbean, and Big Florida, because he was one of the tallest players in the Negro leagues.

Little is known of Trent after his playing career, except for that he died in or near Chicago five years after his playing career ended.
