= William Bell (baseball) =

American baseball player (1897–1969)

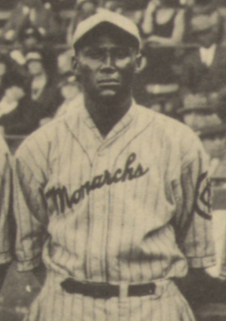
- Bell at the 1924 Colored World Series.
- Pitcher / Outfielder / Manager
- Born: August 31, 1897; Galveston, Texas, U.S.
- Died: March 16, 1969 (aged 71); El Campo, Texas, U.S.
- Batted: Right Threw: Right

debut
- 1923, for the Kansas City Monarchs

Last appearance
- 1948, for the Newark Eagles

Career statistics
- Win–loss record: 124–48
- Winning percentage: .721
- Stats at Baseball Reference

Teams
- As player: Kansas City Monarchs (1923–1930); Harlem Stars (1931); Detroit Wolves (1932); Homestead Grays (1932); Pittsburgh Crawfords (1932–1935); Newark Dodgers (1935); As manager: Newark Eagles (1936–1937, 1948)

Career highlights and awards
- Negro World Series champion (1924)

William Bell (August 31, 1897 – March 16, 1969) was an American professional baseball pitcher, outfielder and manager in the Negro leagues.

Born in Galveston, Texas, Bell played for the Kansas City Monarchs for the first eight seasons of his career. Often overshadowed by star teammates such as "Bullet" Joe Rogan and José Méndez, Bell was described as quiet and well-liked, known for pitching complete games. (Bell completed 74 percent of the games he started.) Bell had a 10–2 record for the 1924 Kansas City Monarchs, compiling a 2.63 ERA. The following year, Bell went 9–3 in the regular season, pitching 2 games in the World Series to a 1.13 ERA. Bell recorded a 16–3 record the next year, followed by a 13–6 record in 1927 and a 10–7 record in 1928. Bell spent the 1928-1929 winter with Havana in the Cuban League, where he was tied for the league lead in wins with nine. Bell then returned to the United States and pitched to a 14–4 record with the Monarchs, followed by a 9–3 record the next year. Bell joined the Detroit Wolves in 1932 after the demise of the Negro National League. He then signed with the Pittsburgh Crawfords, where he compiled a 16–4 record for the 1932 season. Bell then moved to the Newark Dodgers, and when the Dodgers were merged with the Brooklyn Eagles to form the Newark Eagles, he became the Eagles' manager in 1936–1937. Bell's last season in baseball was as Eagles manager in 1948.

Baseball historian Dick Clark estimated that Bell would have averaged an 18–7 record had he played the 154-game schedule that was used in the Major Leagues at the time. He died at age 71 in El Campo, Texas.
