= Harry Salmon (baseball) =

- Pitcher
- Born: May 30, 1895; Warrior, Alabama, U.S.
- Died: April 1983 (aged 87); Pittsburgh, Pennsylvania, U.S.
- Batted: Left Threw: Right

Negro league baseball debut
- 1920, for the Birmingham Black Barons

Last appearance
- 1935, for the Homestead Grays

Teams
- Birmingham Black Barons (1920, 1923–1925, 1927–1932); Pittsburgh Keystones (1921); Memphis Red Sox (1924, 1930); Homestead Grays (1932, 1934–1935)

Harry Lee "Beans" Salmon (May 30, 1895 – April, 1983) was an American professional baseball pitcher in the Negro leagues. He played from 1920 to 1935 with several teams, playing mostly with the Birmingham Black Barons.
