= Detroit Wolves =

- Logo

Information
- League: East-West League
- Location: Hamtramck, Michigan
- Ballpark: Hamtramck Stadium
- Established: 1932

The Detroit Wolves were a Negro league baseball club that played for the 1932 season only.

== Founding ==
In 1931 the Negro National League collapsed. It reformed in 1933, but in the interim Detroit was left without a Negro league team, as the Detroit Stars had been members of the NNL. In 1932, the city placed the Wolves in the new East-West League. They played in Hamtramck Stadium, where the Stars had played.

The team was owned by Cum Posey, who also owned the Homestead Grays and shuffled players between the two teams. Posey was the founder of the East-West League.

== League play ==
The Wolves posted the best record in the league, behind the play of stars like Willie Wells, Cool Papa Bell, Mule Suttles, Quincy Trouppe, Ted Trent, Ray Brown and Judy Johnson.

== Demise ==
By May 1932 the Wolves were about to collapse, but Posey kept pumping money into the club. By June, however, not only the Wolves but all the other teams except the Grays were going broke, so Posey shut down the league.
