= 1940 in baseball =

The following are the baseball events of the year 1940 throughout the world.

== Champions ==
=== Major League Baseball ===
- World Series: Cincinnati Reds over Detroit Tigers (4–3)
- All-Star Game, July 9 at Sportsman's Park: National League, 4–0

=== Other champions ===
- Amateur World Series: Cuba
- Negro League Baseball All-Star Game: East, 11–0
- Mexican League: Azules de Veracruz

== Awards and honors ==
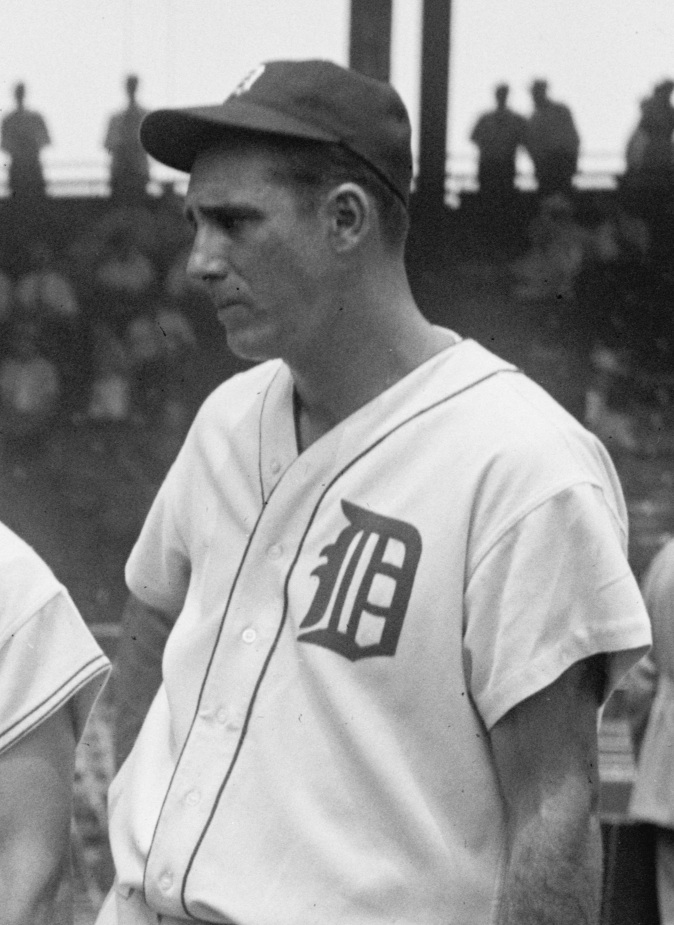
Hank Greenberg, Hall of Famer and 2-time MVP

- Most Valuable Player
  - Hank Greenberg (AL) – OF, Detroit Tigers
  - Frank McCormick (NL) – 1B, Cincinnati Reds
- The Sporting News Player of the Year Award
  - Bob Feller – P, Cleveland Indians
- The Sporting News Most Valuable Player Award
  - Hank Greenberg (AL) – OF, Detroit Tigers
  - Frank McCormick (NL) – 1B, Cincinnati Reds
- The Sporting News Manager of the Year Award
  - Bill McKechnie – Cincinnati Reds

== Statistical leaders ==
	American League		National League		Negro American League		Negro National League	
Stat	Player	Total	Player	Total	Player	Total	Player	Total
AVG	Joe DiMaggio (NYY)	.352	Debs Garms (PIT)	.355	Ed Mayweather (SNS)	.376	Monte Irvin (NE)	.380
HR	Hank Greenberg (DET)	41	Johnny Mize (STL)	43	Turkey Stearnes (KCM)	5	Buster Clarkson (NE); Bill Hoskins (BEG); Buck Leonard (HOM); Henry McHenry (PHS); Lennie Pearson (NE)	8
RBI	Hank Greenberg (DET)	150	Johnny Mize (STL)	137	Turkey Stearnes (KCM)	33	Howard Easterling (HOM)	45
W	Bob Feller^{1} (CLE)	27	Bucky Walters (CIN)	22	Frank Bradley (KCM); Lefty Calhoun (SNS); Jack Matchett (KCM)	6	Ray Brown (HOM)	17
ERA	Bob Feller^{1} (CLE)	2.61	Bucky Walters (CIN)	2.48	George Walker (KCM)	1.29	Ray Brown (HOM)	2.07
K	Bob Feller^{1} (CLE)	261	Kirby Higbe (PHI)	137	Preacher Henry (CBR)	63	Henry McHenry (PHS)	86

^{1} American League Triple Crown pitching winner

== Major league baseball final standings ==
=== American League final standings ===
American League
Team	W	L	Pct.	GB	Home	Road
Detroit Tigers	90	64	.584	—	50‍–‍29	40‍–‍35
Cleveland Indians	89	65	.578	1	51‍–‍30	38‍–‍35
New York Yankees	88	66	.571	2	52‍–‍24	36‍–‍42
Boston Red Sox	82	72	.532	8	45‍–‍34	37‍–‍38
Chicago White Sox	82	72	.532	8	41‍–‍36	41‍–‍36
St. Louis Browns	67	87	.435	23	37‍–‍39	30‍–‍48
Washington Senators	64	90	.416	26	36‍–‍41	28‍–‍49
Philadelphia Athletics	54	100	.351	36	29‍–‍42	25‍–‍58

Locations of teams for the 1940 American League season
American League

=== National League final standings ===
National League
Team	W	L	Pct.	GB	Home	Road
Cincinnati Reds	100	53	.654	—	55‍–‍21	45‍–‍32
Brooklyn Dodgers	88	65	.575	12	41‍–‍37	47‍–‍28
St. Louis Cardinals	84	69	.549	16	41‍–‍36	43‍–‍33
Pittsburgh Pirates	78	76	.506	22½	40‍–‍34	38‍–‍42
Chicago Cubs	75	79	.487	25½	40‍–‍37	35‍–‍42
New York Giants	72	80	.474	27½	33‍–‍43	39‍–‍37
Boston Bees	65	87	.428	34½	35‍–‍40	30‍–‍47
Philadelphia Phillies	50	103	.327	50	24‍–‍55	26‍–‍48

Locations of teams for the 1938–1940 National League seasons
National League

== Negro league baseball final standings ==
All Negro leagues standings below are per MLB and Seamheads.

=== Negro American League final standings ===
vs. Negro American League						vs. Major Black teams			
Negro American League	W	L	T	Pct.	GB	W	L	T	Pct.
Kansas City Monarchs	38	13	1	.740	—	43	21	3	.664
Memphis Red Sox	31	26	0	.544	10	45	43	0	.511
Cleveland Bears	18	18	1	.500	12½	22	21	1	.511
St. Louis–New Orleans Stars	24	25	1	.490	13	30	35	3	.463
Chicago American Giants	22	26	2	.460	14½	25	33	2	.433
Birmingham Black Barons	16	29	0	.356	19	20	39	0	.339
Toledo–Indianapolis Crawfords	9	21	1	.306	18½	12	25	1	.329

Locations of teams for the 1940 Negro American League season
Negro American League
Notes: The Crawfords split time between Toledo and Indianapolis.
*The Stars split time between St. Louis and New Orleans.

=== Negro National League final standings ===
vs. Negro National League						vs. Major Black teams			
Negro National League	W	L	T	Pct.	GB	W	L	T	Pct.
Homestead Grays	28	13	0	.683	—	53	23	2	.692
Baltimore Elite Giants	25	14	0	.641	2	44	29	0	.603
Newark Eagles	25	16	1	.607	3	30	24	2	.554
Philadelphia Stars	17	30	0	.362	14	31	40	0	.437
New York Black Yankees	9	19	0	.321	12½	26	27	0	.491
New York Cubans	8	20	1	.293	13½	15	34	2	.314

Locations of teams for the 1940 Negro National League season
Negro National League
Traveling team: New York Cubans
Note: Homestead Grays play their games equally between Washington, D.C. and Pittsburgh.

=== Independent teams final standings ===
Several All Star teams played against individual teams of established leagues.

vs. All Teams
Independent Clubs	W	L	T	Pct.	GB
North All Stars	1	0	0	1.000	—
Taylor's All Stars	0	1	0	.000	1
Satchel Paige All Stars	0	2	0	.000	1½

== Events ==
=== January ===
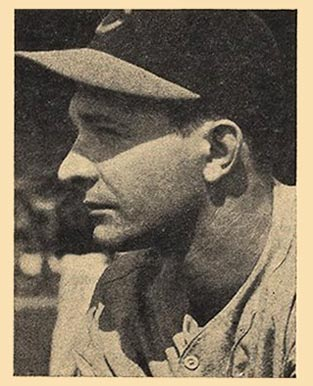
Joe Beggs

- January 4
  - The contestants in last year's World Series, the Cincinnati Reds and champion New York Yankees, make an all-pitcher trade when Cincinnati obtains right-hander Joe Beggs from the Bombers for left-hander Lee Grissom. Beggs, 29, spent all of last season in the minors as a starting pitcher; converted to a reliever in 1940, he'll help the Reds to another National League pennant, winning 12 games and saving seven others.
  - The St. Louis Browns claim side-arming knuckleball hurler Johnny Niggeling on waivers from the Reds. Meanwhile, general manager Bill DeWitt says his Browns, who lost 111 games last year to finish in the American League basement, would welcome assistance in the form of surplus players from other AL clubs to strengthen his bedraggled outfit.
- January 6 – The Yankees place Lou Gehrig on the "voluntarily retired" list. In addition, they retire Gehrig's #4 uniform, worn by the Hall-of-Fame first baseman since they began using numbers to identify players in 1929, and announce that Gehrig's locker in the Bombers' clubhouse will never be assigned to another player. The number retirement is the first ever in Major League Baseball.
- January 10
  - The Chicago White Sox obtain shortstop/second baseman Skeeter Webb from the Cleveland Indians for middle infielders Ollie Bejma and Johnny Gerlach.
  - The Brooklyn Dodgers sign pitcher Wes Ferrell as a free agent. Ferrell, 31, has gone 191–127 (4.03) with six 20-or-more-victory seasons during his 13-year American League career, which ended when the Yankees released him on May 28, 1939; he'll make only one official appearance as a Dodger (on May 10) before drawing his release on May 14, 1940.
- January 14
  - Commissioner of Baseball Kenesaw Mountain Landis voids the Detroit Tigers' December 1939 trade that would have sent pitcher George Coffman and second baseman Benny McCoy to the Philadelphia Athletics for outfielder Wally Moses, because the Tigers—via "fake agreements [and] cover-up deals"—had illegally impeded the careers of McCoy and 90 other "farmhands" through secret working agreements with minor-league teams. McCoy and the other 90 men are declared free agents, and Coffman and Moses are sent back to their former clubs. On January 16, Landis issues new rules intended to eliminate secret agreements and covert player transfers between major- and minor-league teams.
  - Detroit major- and minor-leaguers granted freedom today by the ruling also include Roy Cullenbine, Guy Curtright, Dutch Dietz, Danny Gardella, Paul Gillespie, Catfish Metkovich, Dee Phillips, Johnny Sain, Bryan Stephens and Tommy Tatum.
  - The Landis decision leaves only 78 players in the entire Detroit organization, including 35 on the Tigers' MLB roster, 30 with the team-owned Beaumont Exporters of the high-level Texas League, and 13 with the Henderson Oilers of the Class C East Texas League.
- January 20 – The Cleveland Indians swap outfielders with the Tigers, acquiring outfielder Beau Bell from Detroit for Bruce Campbell. Former All-Star Bell, 32, led the American League in hits (218) and doubles (51) in 1937.
- January 23 – The Boston Bees release veteran right-hander Fred Frankhouse, 35, ending the hurler's 13-year National League career.
- January 29 – Benny McCoy, liberated from the Detroit Tigers 15 days ago, signs with the Philadelphia Athletics as a free agent after a multi-team bidding war. The Athletics, who had tried to trade for McCoy last month, ultimately "get their man," but it costs Connie Mack a record $45,000 bonus. McCoy, 24, hit.302 in 55 games after Detroit recalled him from Toledo in July 1939.
- January 30
  - The Tigers keep dealing, obtaining lefty-swinging catcher Billy Sullivan Jr. from the St. Louis Browns for pitcher George Coffman, whose earlier trade, with McCoy, to Philadelphia had been voided by Commissioner Landis.
  - The Browns make a second deal, purchasing the contract of outfielder Wally Judnich, 24, from the Newark Bears, one of the New York Yankees' top minor-league affiliates.

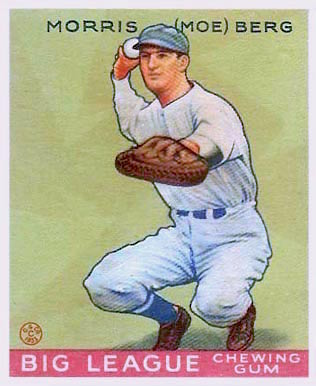
Moe Berg

- January 31
  - Eight of the 14 MLB stadia will host night baseball in 1940, with today's announcement that St. Louis' Sportsman's Park will install lights by May. Yesterday, the Pittsburgh Pirates revealed that Forbes Field will be illuminated this season, and the New York Giants earlier announced plans to bring lights to the Polo Grounds.
  - The Boston Red Sox release catcher Moe Berg, ending his playing career after 15 MLB seasons and 663 games played. In the short term, Berg, 37, joins manager Joe Cronin's staff as a coach, but beginning in 1942, the master linguist will take up a new occupation as an espionage agent for the United States and its Allies, working against the Axis powers.
  - The Brooklyn Dodgers purchase the contract of veteran right-hander Tex Carleton from Milwaukee of the American Association. Carleton, 33, won 94 games and was a member of three NL champions between 1932 and 1938 as a member of the St. Louis Cardinals and Chicago Cubs.

=== February ===
- February 1 – Speaking at Boston's annual baseball writers' dinner, Larry MacPhail, president and general manager of the Brooklyn Dodgers, attacks Commissioner of Baseball Kenesaw Mountain Landis' recently released 3,000-word plan to reform minor league baseball by "abolishing all farm systems." MacPhail claims that the presidents of 15 minor leagues have contacted him, worried that their circuits will have to shut down for the coming season if Landis' plan becomes reality.
  - On February 6, at their late-winter confab, National League owners will vote unanimously to establish a four-man subcommittee to study Landis' reforms, but to delay any changes in the major-minor league agreement until the current pact expires in January 1942.
- February 2 – The election of a Negro National League president ends in a deadlock, with three owners voting for incumbent Tom Wilson and three voting for New York City businessman C. B. Powell.
- February 5 – The Brooklyn Dodgers sign outfielder Roy Cullenbine, 26, who appeared in 75 games for the 1939 Detroit Tigers. Cullenbine, granted free agency January 14 by Commissioner Landis in his ruling that punished the Tigers for manipulation of players' contracts in their farm system, will get a reported $25,000 for signing with Brooklyn.
- February 8 – The St. Louis Browns purchase the contract of right-hander Elden Auker from the Boston Red Sox. Auker, 29, will win 16 games for the 1940 Brownies.
- February 11 – Minor-league czar William G. Bramham expels for life the manager of the 1939 Lenoir Indians of the Class D Tar Heel League for forging signatures on players' contracts. The club's president and five directors are fined and suspended for the same offense.
- February 12 – The Red Sox sell the contract of last season's regular left-fielder, Joe Vosmik, to the Dodgers. A former All-Star who has batted.311 with 1,550 hits in ten American League seasons, the 29-year-old veteran is dealt so that the Red Sox can move sophomore slugging star Ted Williams from right field to Vosmik's old left-field position.
- February 13
  - After only one season, MLB's Rules Committee again eliminates the "sacrifice fly" rule, deciding that batters who hit run-scoring fly balls will be charged with an official at bat in 1940. The contemporary SF rule, which credits the hitter with a sacrifice and does not cost him an at bat, won't return for good until 1954.
  - Major- and minor-league owners and officials and Kenesaw Mountain Landis reach a compromise that preserves the farm system model while preventing abuses such as those committed by the Detroit Tigers and St. Louis Cardinals in recent seasons that ultimately led to the free agency of over 150 players.
- February 15 – The Philadelphia Athletics sign catcher Buddy Hancken as a free agent. Hancken will appear in just one game in the majors, this May 14, as a defensive replacement for Earle Brucker, catching one inning in a 9–7 win over the Cleveland Indians.
- February 20 – The Brooklyn Dodgers acquire a "substantial" ownership interest in their top farm system affiliate, the Montreal Royals of the International League.
- February 23 – A compromise by Alex Pompez ends a three-week stalemate among Negro National League clubs over the election of a league president and the role of promoter Eddie Gottlieb. League president Tom Wilson, vice president Ed Bolden, and secretary Cumberland Posey are all reelected for the 1940 season. Newark Eagles owner Abe Manley, who opposed Wilson's reelection, becomes league treasurer. Gottlieb is allowed to continue promoting the majority of games at Yankee Stadium, but the New York Black Yankees are empowered to promote a double-header at their own home field.
- February 29 – A federal judge rules in favor of Grace Comiskey, widow of J. Louis Comiskey, and awards her ownership of the Chicago White Sox. The First National Bank of Chicago, intent on selling the team, had contested the will, arguing that it contained no specific language granting her the team upon her husband's death.

=== March ===
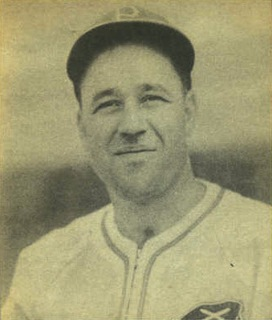
Debs Garms

- March 3 – The Boston Bees sell the contract of outfielder Debs Garms to the Pittsburgh Pirates. Although he records only 385 plate appearances, Garms, 32, will breeze to the National League batting crown (127-for-358, .355) in the season to come.
- March 13 – Vowing that his arm feels "swell," erstwhile holdout Dizzy Dean signs his 1940 contract and leaves for the Chicago Cubs' Catalina training camp. Dean, 30 years old and a future Hall of Famer, has been struggling with a sore arm since a broken toe suffered in the 1937 MLB All-Star Game caused him to alter his pitching motion. He was 6–4 (3.36) in only 19 games and 961/3 innings pitched for the 1939 Cubs.
- March 17 – In Tampa, the National League defeats the American League, 2–1, in a special, charity exhibition game organized by former President Herbert Hoover to benefit the Finnish Relief Fund. The contest, broadcast on the Mutual radio network, raises more than $20,000 to help citizens of Finland whose homes and businesses were destroyed in 1939's attack from the Soviet Union. Tampa native Al López scores the winning run in the bottom of the ninth off losing hurler Bob Feller before 13,180 fans.
- March 23
  - Seeking to entice the major leagues to Southern California, a consortium of unidentified—but wealthy—local sportsmen offer a $5 million financial package to the owners of the financially struggling Boston Bees, Philadelphia Phillies and St. Louis Browns to transfer one of their teams to Los Angeles. MLB officials reject the bid, which would require traveling by air, rather than exclusively by rail.
  - The Detroit Tigers acquire outfielder Jimmy Outlaw from the Bees in a cash transaction.

=== April ===
- April 7 – The New York Yankees, four-times-running World Series champions, are prohibitive favorites (7–20) to win their fifth straight American League pennant in 1940, according to annual odds issued by New York's betting commissioner. The defending Senior Circuit champ Cincinnati Reds and St. Louis Cardinals, both 11–5, are co-favorites in the National League. Later this week, an Associated Press poll will anoint the Yankees and Cardinals as pennant favorites.
- April 16
  - On Opening Day across the major leagues, the Cleveland Indians' Bob Feller fires a 1–0 no-hitter, the first of three he will throw in his Hall-of-Fame career, against the Chicago White Sox at Comiskey Park—as of 2026, MLB's only no-hitter in a season inaugural. Feller, 21, walks five and strikes out eight. Second baseman Ray Mack's brilliant defensive play on Taffy Wright's grounder preserves the no-no, and secures the 27th out in the ninth.
  - At Crosley Field, Paul Derringer limits the Chicago Cubs to six hits and one run, and the Cincinnati Reds begin defense of their NL title by taking their opening game, 2–1. Solo homers account for all three tallies, with Ival Goodman's eighth inning blow off Bill Lee the game-winner for Cincinnati.
  - Before the day's largest crowd, 49,417 at Briggs Stadium, the Detroit Tigers can muster only seven hits against the second-division St. Louis Browns and fall, 5–1. Wracked by its off-season farm-system scandal, Detroit was picked to finish fourth in the AL by odds-makers and sportswriters earlier this week.
  - At Shibe Park, the New York Yankees, favored to win their fifth straight AL flag, drop a ten-inning, 2–1 decision to the lowly Philadelphia Athletics. Chubby Dean pitches a complete game and knocks in the winning run himself with a run-scoring fly ball.

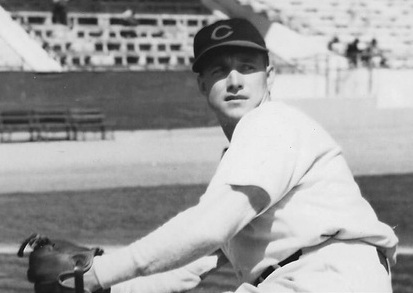
Bucky Walters

- April 22 – With heavy rains and cold temperatures wreaking havoc with the opening week of the MLB season, the rising floodwaters of the Ohio River and its tributaries threaten the opening contest of a three-game series between the Cincinnati Reds and St. Louis Cardinals at Crosley Field. Players sit on benches at field level, because the dugouts are inundated with one foot of water. With rain still falling, Cincinnati wins its third straight, 6–1, behind Bucky Walters' complete game and three runs batted in. The final two games of the series will be postponed when Crosley's playing surface itself is submerged during peak flood stage.
- April 23 – Future Hall of Famer Pee Wee Reese makes his major league debut for the Brooklyn Dodgers at Ebbets Field. Playing shortstop (in place of Leo Durocher, his manager) and batting eighth, Reese, 21, singles in three at bats, scores two runs and drives in another, and commits an error in the field in an 8–3 win over the Boston Bees.
- April 26 – The Washington Senators reacquire hard-hitting Zeke Bonura from the New York Giants for $20,000. The first baseman, 31, batted.321 in 123 games for the 1939 Giants. Bonura had spent 1938 with Washington, knocking in 114 runs, before his contract was sold to the Giants that November.
- April 30 – Rescued from the minor leagues on January 31, veteran righty Tex Carleton no-hits the Cincinnati Reds, 3–0, at postdiluvial Crosley Field for the Dodgers' ninth straight win to start the 1940 season. Carleton walks two, fans four, and survives three Brooklyn errors committed behind him. Tomorrow, the Reds halt the Dodgers' streak, scoring eight runs in the fourth inning and running away with a 9–2 victory.

=== May ===
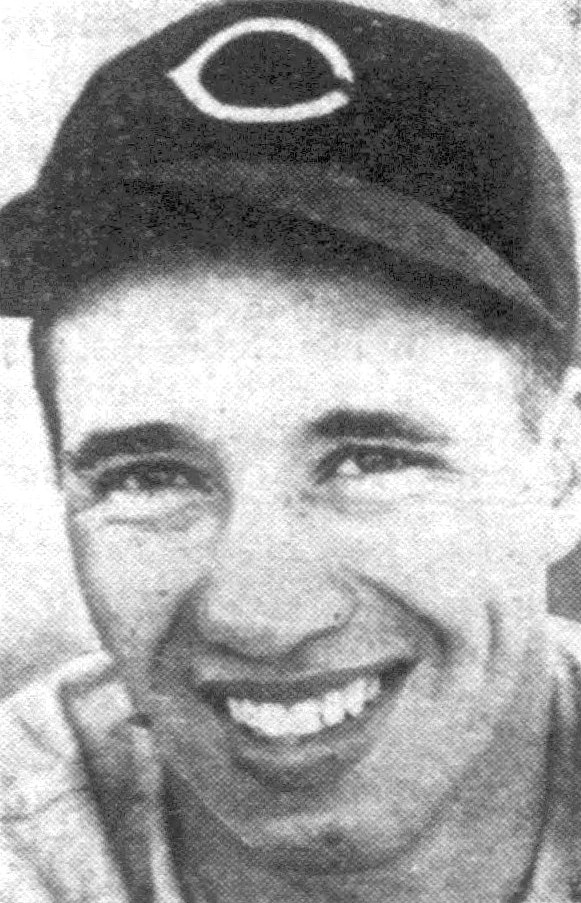
Bob Feller

- May 7
  - Joe DiMaggio appears in the New York Yankees' lineup for the first time since the 1940 American League season began over three weeks ago, going one-for-five in a 4–2 loss to the Detroit Tigers in the Bronx. The Yanks won only six of the 15 games DiMaggio missed due to his injured knee.
  - The St. Louis Cardinals overwhelm the Brooklyn Dodgers, 18–2, at Sportsman's Park. The Cards rack up 49 total bases on 20 hits, with 13 for extra bases, including seven home runs—tying a National League record for homers in a game, and the most by any MLB team in a contest this season. Eddie Lake, who drives in five, and Johnny Mize each slug two long-balls. Brooklyn manager Leo Durocher leaves starter Hugh Casey in the game for seven innings; he surrenders 13 runs, all earned.
    - In the ninth inning, St. Louis catcher Bill DeLancey, 28, appears in a major-league box score for the first time since September 29, 1935. A key part of the 1934 "Gashouse Gang" as a rookie and on a path to stardom, DeLancey was stricken with tuberculosis at age 23 in 1935, and has been battling to regain his health ever since. He'll play in only 15 games this season, catching 371/3 innings, in his final major-league campaign.
- May 8 – The Cincinnati Reds trade outfielder Vince DiMaggio to the Pittsburgh Pirates for outfielder Johnny Rizzo.
- May 9 – An estimated 10,000 fans greet the Dodgers when their chartered airplane lands at Brooklyn's Floyd Bennett Field. Although their first-place team is returning from a successful (8–2) road trip, the event's excitement is generated by its pioneering of air travel, introduced by club president Larry MacPhail. Tonight's flight from Chicago is the Dodgers' second of the week. Catcher Babe Phelps declines the airborne journey, boarding an eastbound train instead.
- May 11 – The first-place Boston Red Sox (16–5) score two runs in the visitors' 11th inning to break a seven-all tie, then hold on during the home half of the frame to defeat the host New York Yankees, 9–8. Boston wins its sixth straight, and pins the eighth consecutive defeat on the Yankees, now 6–14. Heavy, if not prohibitive, favorites to win their fifth straight AL pennant in 1940, the Bombers are now eighth and last in the Junior Circuit, 9½ games behind the Red Sox and two full games out of seventh.
- May 13 – In a blunder committed by the National League office, no umpires are assigned to the St. Louis Cardinals–Cincinnati Reds contest at Crosley Field. Veteran NL arbiter and Cincinnati resident Larry Goetz, who had a scheduled day off, is hastily summoned to the park to officiate behind the plate; Reds' coach Jimmie Wilson and Cardinals' pitcher Lon Warneke (a future NL umpire) are stationed at first and third bases.
  - The game, delayed 29 minutes while the situation is resolved, features three homers by Redbird slugger Johnny Mize, and the teams play to an 8–8 tie in 14 innings over three hours and 35 minutes before a curfew halts matters. Mize's achievement and all statistics will count, but the game will be replayed in its entirety on August 11.
- May 17 – At League Park, the host Cleveland Indians score ten runs in the first inning and cruise to an 18–1 rout of the Washington Senators. Cleveland capitalizes on the wildness of Washington starting pitcher Sid Hudson, who walks five of the six hitters he faces, without recording an out. The victory enables the 15–8 Indians to move within 2½ games of first place.
- May 20
  - Detroit Tigers third baseman Pinky Higgins belts three home runs, hitting them in the fourth, fifth, and seventh innings in the Tigers' 10–7 win over the Red Sox at Fenway Park. Detroit is 14–11, in third place and four games behind Boston.
  - The Chicago White Sox, who have lost their first nine home games of 1940, finally win at Comiskey Park, defeating the Senators, 5–4. The White Sox, now 10–16, have stayed afloat by winning nine of their 16 road games thus far.
- May 22 – The Brooklyn Dodgers sign infielder and future front-office executive Al Campanis as a free agent. Campanis, 23, turns professional after graduating from New York University, where he was a multi-sport athlete.
- May 24 – Two major league ballparks introduce night baseball.
  - The American League's St. Louis Browns play their first home game under artificial lights, but their fans—24,827 strong—leave Sportsman's Park unhappy when the home side fall to Bob Feller and the Cleveland Indians, 3–2.
  - In the National League, 22,260 witness the first night contest at the Polo Grounds, where the New York Giants defeat the Boston Bees, 8–1.
- May 25 – Larry MacPhail picks up another useful former American Leaguer when he purchases the contract of outfielder Jimmy Wasdell from the Washington Senators. Since becoming general manager of the Dodgers in 1938, MacPhail has acquired hidden stars like Dixie Walker and Whit Wyatt from AL teams. Wasdell's impact will not be as great, but he'll be a valuable platoon outfielder and left-handed bat for Brooklyn this season and in 1941.
  - Continuing to shake up the Dodger outfield over the next four days, MacPhail will exchange Roy Cullenbine for the right-handed-swinging Joe Gallagher of the St. Louis Browns, then sell the contract of Gene Moore to the left-handed hitter's former club, the Boston Bees.
- May 30 – Only Johnny Hudson stands between Carl Hubbell and a perfect game at Ebbets Field. The Brooklyn second baseman's third-inning single is the only baserunner the Giants' Hall-of-Fame southpaw will allow in today's 7–0, one-hit victory. When Hudson is promptly erased by a double play, Hubbell faces the minimum of 27 batters. He fans seven.

=== June ===
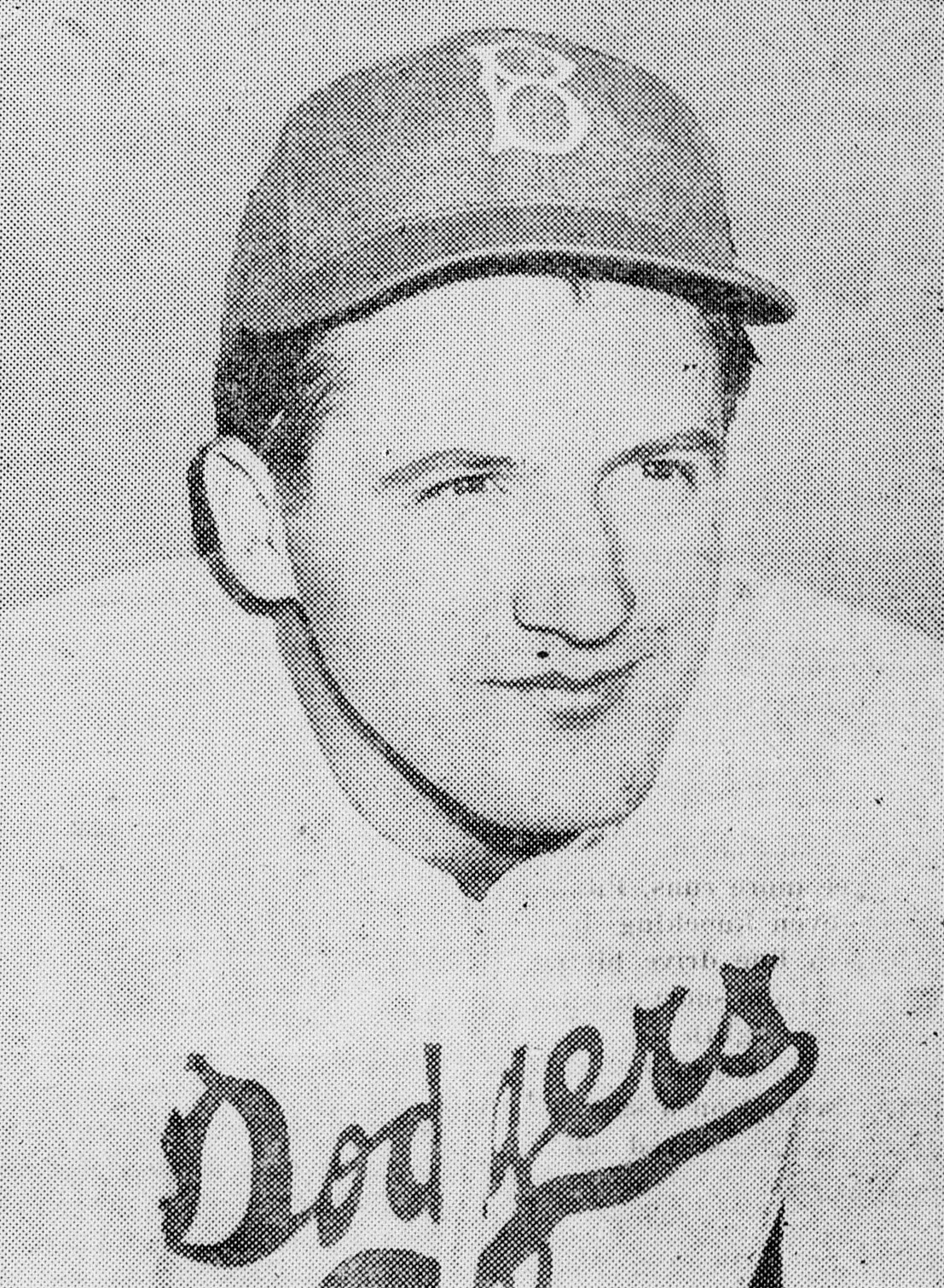
Joe Medwick in Brooklyn flannels

- June 4 – Sportsman's Park hosts the St. Louis Cardinals' first home night game. Joe Medwick goes five for five, hitting three doubles, yet fails to score a single run and his Redbirds fall to the Brooklyn Dodgers, 10–1. Official attendance is 23,500.
- June 6
  - The struggling Cardinals, projected to contend but now 14–24, in sixth place in the National League and 13½ games behind, fire second-year manager Ray Blades. To replace him, owner Sam Breadon selects Billy Southworth, 47, whose Rochester Red Wings are 29–13 and dominating the International League. His hiring gives Southworth a second chance to manage the Cardinals; he had been fired after only 88 games as the rookie pilot of the 1929 Redbirds. After the team turns around to post a 69–40 record under him this season and 97 wins in 1941, Southworth will lead the Cardinals to three straight NL pennants (1942–1944) and two World Series titles through 1945, and be elected to the National Baseball Hall of Fame.
  - The Boston Bees sign 19-year-old left-handed pitcher Warren Spahn, a recent high school graduate from Buffalo who will become MLB's winningest southpaw of all time (363 career victories), winner of the 1957 Cy Young Award, and a first-ballot Hall of Famer.
- June 8 – At Crosley Field, the Cincinnati Reds' Harry Craft hits for the cycle and goes five-for-five with six runs batted in in a 23–2 romp over the Brooklyn Dodgers. It's the first "cycle" of 1940, with five other big-leaguers eventually equalling Craft's feat. The Reds' 27 hits are the most of an MLB team in a 1940 game, and—in addition to Craft's perfect, five-hit day—three other Cincinnati players (Lonny Frey, Ernie Lombardi and Frank McCormick) lash four hits themselves.
- June 12 – The Dodgers and Cardinals pull off a blockbuster trade when Brooklyn acquires slugging outfielder Joe Medwick and pitcher Curt Davis from St. Louis for pitchers Carl Doyle and Sam Nahem, infielder Bert Haas, outfielder Ernie Koy and $125,000. Medwick, 28, is a future Hall of Famer who has already won a batting Triple Crown and National League MVP Award (in 1937), and led the NL in runs batted in three times. But he has worn out his welcome in St. Louis this season after a lengthy contract dispute and inconsistency at the plate: mired in a one-for-12 slump, he was booed by Sportsman's Park fans during the Cardinals' recent five-game losing skid.
- June 13 – The Cleveland Indians, embroiled in a four-team American League pennant race and only 1½ games out of first place, mutiny when a delegation of veteran players meets with owner Alva Bradley to demand the firing of caustic, old-school manager Ossie Vitt. In what will become famous as the "Crybaby Rebellion," players charge Vitt with multiple offenses ranging from his abusive treatment of them to his "wild man" and "jittery" behavior on the bench. They claim that Vitt is sabotaging the team's chances in the AL race.
  - In today's standings, the four main contenders—Boston (27–16), Cleveland (29–21), Detroit (26–20), and New York (25–22)—are separated by four games.
  - The rebellion will not immediately cost Vitt his job. Opposing bench jockeys and fans will heckle the Indians all season long as "crybabies"—with some spectators in enemy cities dressing up as babies to rub in the insult.
- June 15
  - In a 12–1 victory over the Pittsburgh Pirates at the Polo Grounds, the New York Giants' Harry Danning hits for the cycle, capped by a ninth-inning, inside-the-park home run. Danning's blow becomes lodged behind the Eddie Grant memorial, erected below the Giants' center-field clubhouse, 483 feet (147 m) from home plate.
  - The defending NL champion Cincinnati Reds, two games behind Dodgers in the standings, swap outfielders with the sixth-place Philadelphia Phillies, sending recently acquired Johnny Rizzo to the Phils for 1939 All-Star Morrie Arnovich.
  - Another contender, the Giants—also two games out of first place and in the midst of an eight-game winning streak—obtain veteran second baseman Tony Cuccinello, 32, from the last-place Boston Bees for pitcher Manny Salvo and infielder Al Glossop.
- June 18 – Joe Medwick, recently acquired by the Brooklyn Dodgers from the St. Louis Cardinals, is beaned by former teammate Bob Bowman in the first inning of today's 7–5 St. Louis victory at Ebbets Field. As Medwick is carried off on a stretcher, enraged Brooklyn club president Larry MacPhail charges onto the field, demanding criminal charges be brought against Bowman, who had exchanged taunts with Dodger manager Leo Durocher before the game.
- June 22 – Casey Stengel's hapless Boston Bees (17–32) commit eight errors—seven by their four infielders and one by hurler Bill Posedel—and drop a 9–2 decision to the Cardinals at "the Beehive."
- June 23
  - The Cleveland Indians win their eighth game in a row, downing the Boston Red Sox in the first game of a doubleheader before 56,569 at massive Cleveland Stadium. The Indians are 10–1 since news broke of a player rebellion against manager Ossie Vitt. Their win streak propels them into first place in the Junior Circuit, two games ahead of the Detroit Tigers.
  - New York Giants shortstop Billy Jurges suffers a severe concussion when he's accidentally struck in the head by a Bucky Walters fastball in the seventh inning of the Cincinnati Reds' 7–4 victory at the Polo Grounds. Jurges will be able to appear in only ten more games during the season. The Giants, 33–21 and today only three games out of first place, will go only 39–59 for the remainder of the year and finish a distant sixth.

=== July ===
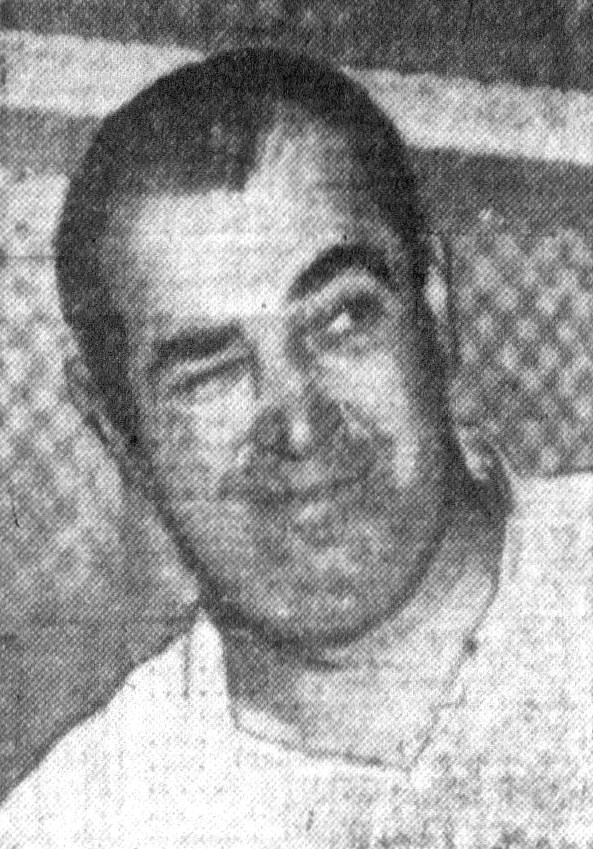
Bobo Newsom

- July 1 – Detroit Tigers right-hander Bobo Newsom wins his 11th straight decision and throws his 11th complete game of 1940 with today's 3–1 victory over the Chicago White Sox at Briggs Stadium. Gunning for his third straight season of 20 or more wins, the colorful Newsom, 32, has not lost since Opening Day on April 16.
- July 2 – The White Sox "lose" again—without throwing a pitch—when American League president Will Harridge upholds the New York Yankees' protest of Chicago's 1–0 victory that took place June 20 at Comiskey Park. The dispute centered on whether Chicago outfielder Moose Solters held Bill Dickey's fly ball long enough to record an out before dropping it. Harridge today rules the game a "no-decision," it goes into the books as a tie, and individual statistics will stand: Johnny Rigney gains credit for an 11-inning, complete game shutout—but no victory.
  - The game will be replayed in full on September 18, when the ChiSox and Bombers split a doubleheader.
- July 5 – In the longest game, by innings, of 1940, the first-place Brooklyn Dodgers defeat the seventh-place Boston Bees, 6–2, scoring four runs in the top of the 20th inning. Shoddy fielding again dooms Boston, which commits two errors in the decisive frame. Rookie Pee Wee Reese delivers a clutch, two-RBI single to put the game out of the Bees' reach.
- July 7 – In a front-page story, The New York Times reports—ultimately erroneously—that James Farley, chairman of the Democratic National Committee and Postmaster General, is leaving politics to purchase the New York Yankees from the estate of the late Jacob Ruppert for between $3.5 and $4 million. Farley will indeed abandon politics, but economic conditions and the looming threat of war discourage would-be investors and his bid for the Bombers collapses.
- July 9
  - Boston Bees outfielder Max West hits a three-run home run off Red Ruffing in the first inning, as the host National League defeats the American League, 4–0, in the All-Star Game at Sportsman's Park. Five NL pitchers hurl the Midsummer Classic's first shutout and narrow the AL's series edge to five victories against three losses.
  - This year's All-Star break sees tight races in each league. In the American, the Detroit Tigers (44–27) lead the Cleveland Indians (45–29) by a half game, with the Boston Red Sox (41–31) 3½ out. In the National, the defending champion Cincinnati Reds (46–23) are just a half-game in front of the Brooklyn Dodgers (45–23). The "second half" of the year will see busier schedules, as games postponed by the early season's cold and rainy weather are made up.
- July 13 – St. Louis Cardinals slugger Johnny Mize hits for the cycle in a 7–6 triumph over the visiting New York Giants. His triple, which completes the "cycle," comes in the bottom of the ninth, and results in Mize scoring the winning run on an error by catcher Harry Danning, who himself notched a cycle on June 15 of this season.
- July 19
  - Catcher Buddy Rosar, who normally backs up hard-hitting, Hall of Famer Bill Dickey in the New York Yankees' lineup, hits for the cycle in a 15–6 drubbing of the Cleveland Indians in the Bronx. The loss, Cleveland's sixth in a row, drops the Indians to 1½ games behind the Detroit Tigers, who shut out the Boston Red Sox, 4–0, behind Tommy Bridges.
  - In a battle of AL tail-enders, the St. Louis Browns break a club-record, 14-game losing streak by holding off the Philadelphia Athletics, 9–7, at Shibe Park. Future actor Johnny Berardino, who'll become famous as a longtime star of General Hospital, seals the Brownie win with a ninth-inning home run.
  - The Brooklyn Dodgers and Chicago Cubs brawl at Wrigley Field after Brooklyn's Hugh Casey throws two pitches at batter Claude Passeau's head, then hits him in the back with another offering. Passeau fires his bat at Casey, the benches clear, and ultimately Brooklyn's Joe Gallagher and Passeau are ejected by umpire Ziggy Sears. Casey, however, stays in the game, which Chicago wins, 11–4.
- July 21 – The American League front-runners each sweep doubleheaders, on the road, separating themselves—for now—from would-be competitors.
  - The second-place Cleveland Indians (51–35) tame the hard-hitting, third-place Boston Red Sox twice at Fenway Park, 3–2 and 2–0, behind Bob Feller and Joe Dobson.
  - In the Bronx, the first-place Detroit Tigers (52–33) maintain their 1½-game lead over Cleveland, edging the fourth-place New York Yankees twice, 4–3 and 3–2. The Yankee Stadium crowd of 68,590 showers home plate umpire Joe Rue with pop bottles, fruit, and other debris after Rue's controversial call in the fifth inning of Game 2 foils a Bomber rally; the outburst is quelled only when uniformed police enter the stadium and restore order.
- July 23 – The defending NL champion Cincinnati Reds continue their midsummer hot streak, sweeping a twin bill against the Brooklyn Dodgers at Ebbets Field, 4–3 and 9–2, to extend their lead to seven full games over the Dodgers. Cincinnati has won 11 of 13 since the All-Star Game.
  - The opener is marred by an eighth-inning brawl, when Cincinnati's Lonny Frey slides with spikes high into Dodger second baseman Pete Coscarart, successfully disrupting a potential double play and enabling the Reds to tie the score, three-all. Coscarart comes up swinging and players from each club swarm the combatants, with Brooklyn pitcher Whit Wyatt slapping Frey in the face with his glove. Frey and Coscarart are ejected by umpire Bick Campbell. Reds starting pitcher Junior Thompson leaves the game with spike wounds inflicted during the fight. Cincinnati wins in 11 innings on rookie Mike McCormick's RBI single.
  - Highly touted Dodger rookie "Pistol Pete" Reiser, 21, is recalled from Montreal and debuts as Brooklyn's right-fielder in Game 1; he goes 0-for-3.
- July 26 – Ernie Lombardi, the Reds' five-time NL All-Star and future Hall-of-Fame catcher, badly sprains an ankle during a pinch-hitting appearance in Cincinnati's seventh straight victory, a 9–5 decision over the Philadelphia Phillies at Shibe Park. Back-up catcher Willard Hershberger, hitting a robust .354 in 42 games so far in 1940, becomes Cincinnati's primary backstop while Lombardi recovers.
- July 29 – After the Pittsburgh Pirates score six ninth-inning runs to erase the Brooklyn Dodgers' 6–0 lead in a sweltering afternoon game at Ebbets Field, the Bucs' Arky Vaughan and the Dodgers' Babe Phelps engage in a spirited fist-fight at first base in the bottom of the frame. Both are ejected by arbiter Lou Jorda, then the Dodgers pull out a 7–6 win four batters later. It's Brooklyn's third on-field fight in the last ten days.

=== August ===
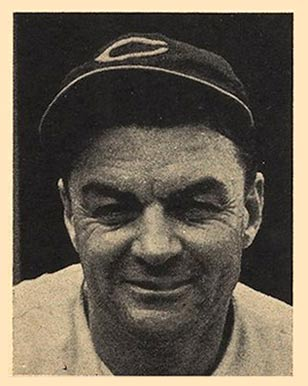
Jimmie Wilson

- August 1 – The Detroit Tigers release infielder Red Kress, a 13-year MLB veteran, and add him to their coaching staff.
- August 2 – Player–manager Joe Cronin registers the major leagues' fifth "cycle" of 1940, enabling his third-place Boston Red Sox to down the league-leading Tigers, 12–9, at Briggs Stadium. It's also the second cycle of Cronin's career (his first coming against the Red Sox on September 2, 1929). The Bosox are now 5½ games behind Detroit.
- August 3
  - Distraught by what he viewed as his poor performance as the Cincinnati Reds' emergency first-string catcher, Willard Hershberger fails to report for a Saturday doubleheader against the Boston Bees at National League Park and takes his own life in his hotel room. The Reds (61–31) have lost five of the nine games Hershberger has started during a grueling, East Coast road trip since July 23, but they remain six games ahead in the NL race. Manager Bill McKechnie tells his shaken team: "We must now win the pennant and give his widowed mother a full share of the World Series money."
  - Veteran right-hander Willis Hudlin continues his major-league odyssey, joining his fourth team of the 1940 season, the St. Louis Browns, as a free agent. Hudlin, 34, had won 157 games over 15 years with the Cleveland Indians until they released him May 13. He has since toiled for the Washington Senators (released mid-July) and New York Giants (released July 28) before signing with the Browns, who will release him on September 10.
- August 5 – The Browns' "Silent" John Whitehead holds the Detroit Tigers hitless over six full innings at Sportsman's Park before the game is stopped by rain. He fans two, walks one and allows a second baserunner on an error. Whitehead's only MLB victory of 1940 lowers his earned run average from 8.44 to 6.59.
- August 12
  - With the Cleveland Indians and Detroit Tigers both 64–44 and in a dead heat at the top of the American League, Bob Feller wins his 20th game of 1940, defeating another future Hall of Famer, Hal Newhouser, 8–5, at League Park. Feller (who has lost six) goes the distance, and is supported by first-inning homers from Hal Trosky and Beau Bell. The Indians now lead the Tigers by a game in the topsy-turvy AL pennant race.
  - The Cincinnati Reds activate coach Jimmie Wilson to serve as backup catcher to starter Ernie Lombardi. Wilson, 40, a former NL All-Star, has appeared in only 46 games since 1937, devoting his time to managing and coaching in the meantime. Still reeling from Willard Hershberger's August 3 suicide, the Reds are seeking to improve their depth at catcher.
- August 15 – Pee Wee Reese, rookie shortstop of the NL's second-place Brooklyn Dodgers, breaks a bone in his left heel during a slide; the injury ends his season after 84 games and hampers his team's pennant chances. The Dodgers will go 25–21 the rest of the way and finish second.
- August 18
  - The New York Daily News publishes a detailed article by Jimmy Cannon in which the columnist falsely claims that the 1940 Yankees are struggling in the standings because key players have been "infected" by poliomyelitis spread by former teammate Lou Gehrig—who in truth is gravely ill from ALS, a non-infectious disease. The story enrages Gehrig, who sues Cannon and his newspaper for $1 million. The Daily News will settle out of court. Barely nine months after the story appears, Gehrig dies at age 37.
  - At Comiskey Park, the East routs the West, 11–0, in the East–West All-Star Game, which features the greatest players in the Negro leagues. Buck Leonard and Marvin Barker lead a 12-hit attack; Henry McHenry gets the victory.
- August 23 – The Cincinnati Reds, now 71–43 and 6½ games up on the Dodgers, acquire veteran outfielder Jimmy Ripple, 30, on waivers from Brooklyn's Montreal farm club. It's a "steal" for general manager Warren Giles: Ripple starts 30 of Cincinnati's last 33 games and bats .307 with 31 hits to help win the NL pennant—then starts all seven games of the 1940 World Series in left field, bats .333, and scores the clinching run in Game 7 to win the world championship.
- August 24 – With the second-place Detroit Tigers boasting an 11–1 lead in the eighth inning at Fenway Park, Boston Red Sox manager Joe Cronin calls sophomore hitting sensation Ted Williams in from left field to "mop up" and pitch the last two frames of the contest. Williams, 21, a former San Diego high-school mound star, enters today batting .345 with 18 homers and 85 runs batted in. In Williams' only pitching appearance in the majors, he faces nine men, allowing three hits, one walk, and one earned run, and strikes out Detroit slugger Rudy York, looking.

=== September ===
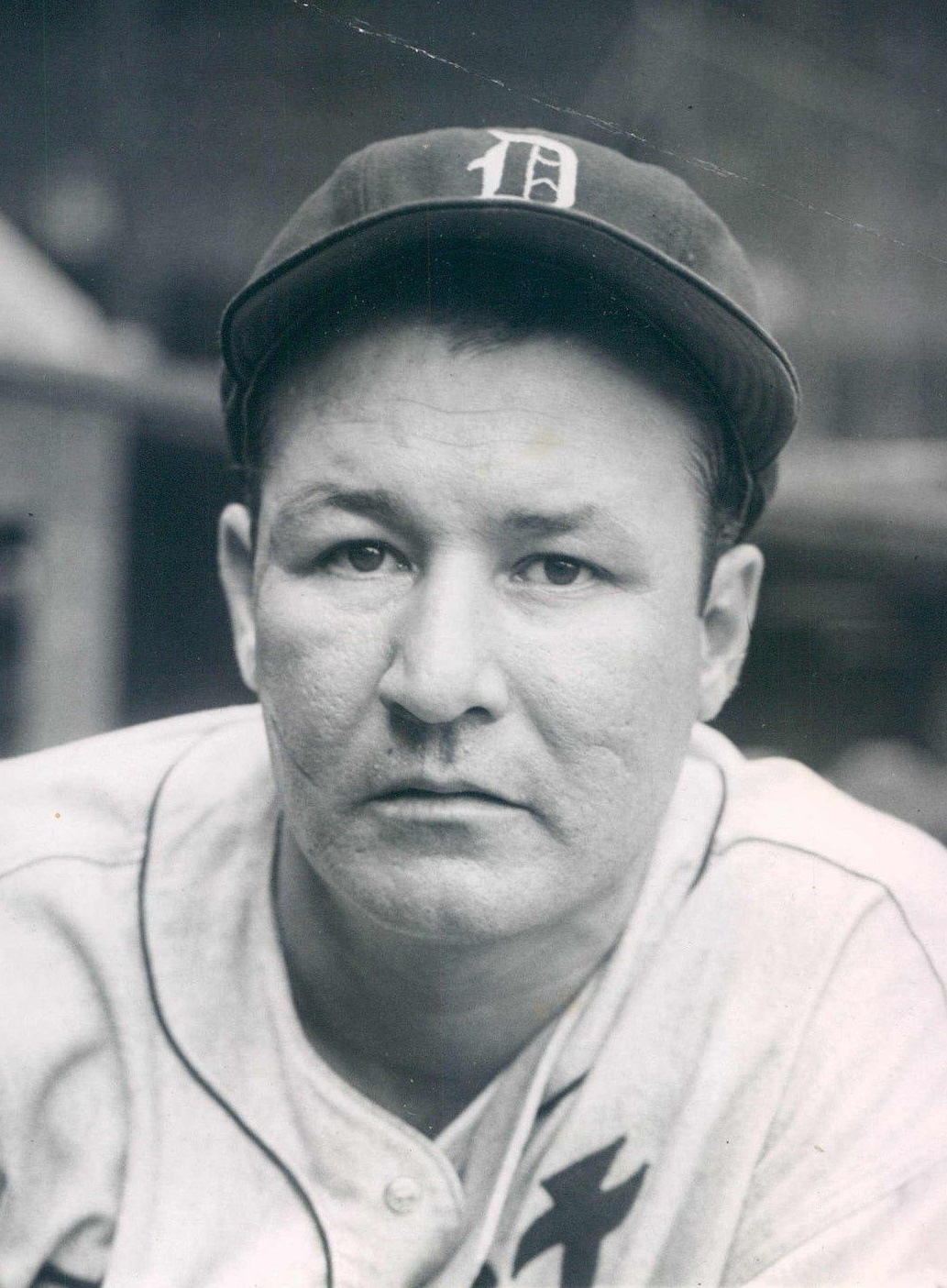
Rudy York

- September 2 – Labor Day sees the American League pennant race welcome a new contender, the four-time defending champion New York Yankees, now 71–55 and virtually tied with the 72–56 Detroit Tigers; both are 3½ games behind the Cleveland Indians (75–52). The Yankees, below .500 as recently as August 8, split their holiday doubleheader with the Philadelphia Athletics today, while Cleveland falls twice to the St. Louis Browns and Detroit is swept by the Chicago White Sox.
  - In the National League, the Cincinnati Reds (80–56) split their twin bill with the onrushing St. Louis Cardinals to remain 7½ lengths ahead of the Brooklyn Dodgers.
- September 4–6 – The American League race takes another wild turn when the host Tigers sweep the first-place Indians in a critical three-game series at Briggs Stadium to slash Cleveland's lead from four games to a single contest. The one-sided scores are 7–2, 11–3 and 10–5; Detroit out-homers (7–1) and out-hits (35–26) Cleveland, and extends the Indians' losing streak to five games.
- September 5 – The St. Louis Cardinals acquire left-hander Al Brazle from the Boston Red Sox for righty Mike Ryba. Brazle will post a sterling 97–64 (3.31) record in his ten-year Cardinal career, starting as a "swing man" before focusing mainly on relief; he'll lead the NL in saves in both 1952 and 1953.
- September 8
  - Johnny Mize belts three home runs in a game for the second time this season, but his Redbirds fall, 16–14, to the Pittsburgh Pirates at Sportsman's Park. Maurice Van Robays stars for Pittsburgh, with four hits (including a homer) and four runs batted in.
  - Joe Gordon of the rampaging Yankees hits for the cycle and scores three runs in a 9–4 romp over the Boston Red Sox at Fenway Park. Gordon's is the sixth "cycle" in the big leagues this season. He reaches base in all six plate appearances, going four-for-four and drawing two walks. New York, which has posted a 25–6 record over the past month, remains a game behind the virtually tied AL-leading Cleveland Indians and Detroit Tigers.
- September 16
  - A 21-year-old Ebbets Field fan, enraged by an umpire's reversed call that went against his Brooklyn Dodgers, jumps onto the playing field and punches arbiter George Magerkurth; the two men trade multiple blows but are not seriously injured. The man is arrested for third-degree assault and Brooklyn loses, 4–3, to fall further behind in the NL pennant chase.
  - With brutal wars raging in both Europe and China, and the Empire of Japan signing an alliance with the Axis Powers, President Franklin Delano Roosevelt signs the Selective Service Act of 1940 into law, creating a peacetime military draft for the first time in U.S. history. By the end of 1941, two million American men will be in uniform.
- September 18 – Famed for his consecutive no-hitters in 1938, Johnny Vander Meer adds another line to his résumé, lasting 12 innings on the mound, then scoring the winning run in the Cincinnati Reds' pennant-clinching, 4–3 victory over the Philadelphia Phillies at Shibe Park. Joe Beggs works the 13th to nail down the save. Vander Meer spent part of 1940 in the minor leagues to improve his command of the strike zone. The Reds, wrapping up their second straight NL flag, third overall, are in the midst of an 11-game winning streak.
- September 20–22 – The Cleveland Indians and Detroit Tigers, both now 85–61 and deadlocked at the top of the AL standings, meet for a three-game series at Briggs Stadium for the second time this month. In this confrontation, the Tigers take two out of three to secure a one-game lead. Detroit grabs the first two contests, 6–5 and 5–0, with wins going to Hal Newhouser and Schoolboy Rowe; in the third, Bob Feller wins his 27th game of the season and helps his own cause with a home run to salvage the finale, 10–5.
- September 24 – Jimmie Foxx of the Boston Red Sox slugs the 500th home run of his MLB career; it happens in a familiar ballyard (Shibe Park) against his original team (the Philadelphia Athletics). Foxx's blow comes off right-hander George Caster in the sixth inning of Boston's 16–8 victory in the first game of a twin bill, and is part of a five-batter sequence in which Ted Williams, Foxx, and Joe Cronin homer, Bobby Doerr triples, and Jim Tabor homers.
- September 25 – The host Detroit Tigers sweep their nemesis, the Chicago White Sox, in a doubleheader, 10–9 and 3–2, to dramatically improve their pennant chances. Bobo Newsom wins both games, his 20th and 21st victories of 1940, closing the opener with two innings of scoreless relief, then starting the nightcap and firing a complete game. The Tigers had entered today only 7–13 against the fourth-place Pale Hose; by day's end, at 89–62, they hold a two-game advantage over Cleveland (87–64).
- September 27
  - Needing one victory in his club's final three-game series against the rival Indians at Cleveland Stadium to win the pennant, Tigers' manager Del Baker chooses obscure Floyd Giebell as his starter to oppose Cleveland's 27-game winner and future Hall of Famer Bob Feller in today's opener. Giebell, 30, has made only one previous appearance for Detroit in 1940. He proceeds to go the distance and shut out the Indians on six hits; Detroit gets only three safeties off Feller, but one of them is Rudy York's two-run homer. Giebell's 2–0 win seals the Tigers' sixth American League championship, and their first since 1935.
    - The third-place New York Yankees, a half game behind the Indians, are also eliminated from contention by Giebell's feat.
    - Feller's defeat mars an exceptional season for the 21-year-old fireballer: he wins a "pitching Triple Crown," topping AL hurlers in games won, earned run average (2.61) and strikeouts (261). What's more, his 31 complete games, four shutouts, 3201/3 innings pitched and 9.8 bWAR also are league-bests.
  - The also-ran Boston Red Sox, 77–72 and fifth in the AL, thrash the Washington Senators, 24–4, in the opener of a Fenway Park doubleheader. Rookie Dominic DiMaggio scores five runs, and pitcher Fritz Ostermueller tallies four times. The 24 runs are the most scored by a team in an MLB game this year. The Red Sox will win their final five games to squeak into the first division, tying the Chicago White Sox for fourth place, eight games behind the Tigers.
- September 29 — Cleveland wins its anticlimactic two final contests to ultimately finish one game behind Detroit, disappointing baseball fans rooting for what would have been the only "All-Ohio" World Series in baseball history; Cincinnati had already breezed to the 1940's NL title by 12 games.

=== October ===
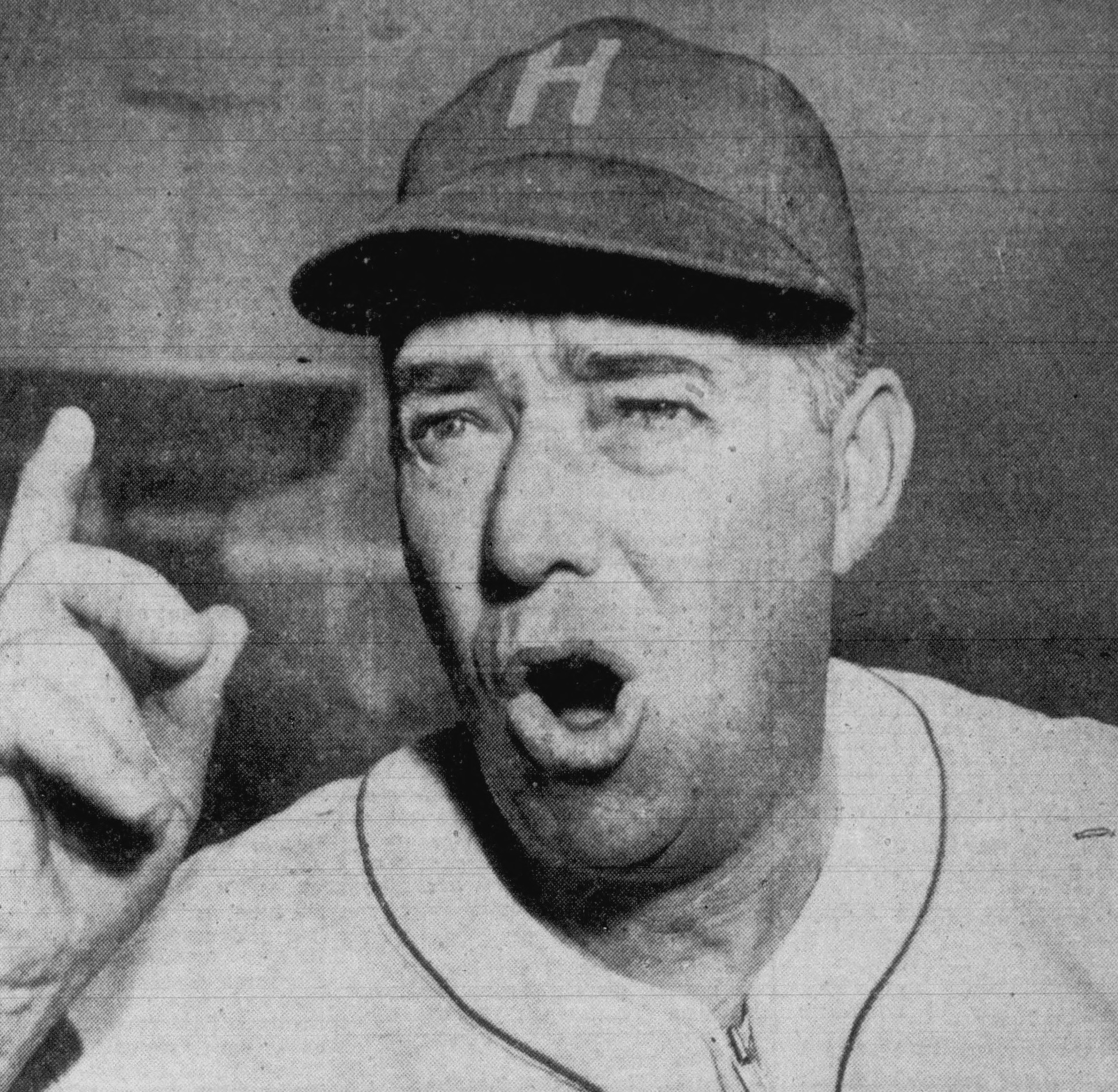
Ossie Vitt

- October 2 – The 37th World Series opens at Crosley Field. With his proud father, Henry, in the stands, Bobo Newsom, the Detroit Tigers' 21-game winner, scatters eight hits over nine innings, while Paul Derringer, the Cincinnati Reds' 20-game winner, is driven from the mound during the Tigers' five-run, second-inning uprising, and Detroit takes Game 1, 7–2. Pinky Higgins and Dick Bartell deliver two-run singles to help chase Derringer.
  - Ernie Lombardi, Cincinnati's future Hall-of-Fame catcher, is unable to play today because of his chronic ankle injury; Jimmie Wilson, a 40-year-old former full-time coach, is the starter behind the plate. Lombardi will start only one game and catch only seven innings of this year's seven-game Fall Classic.
  - Early the next morning, Newsom's father, a 68-year-old retired farmer, suffers a fatal heart attack in his Cincinnati hotel room. The devastated pitcher forsakes traveling to Hartsville, South Carolina, for the funeral to remain with the Tigers. On October 6, he will start Game 5 in Detroit and allow only three hits in an 8–0 complete-game victory, giving the Tigers a three-games-to-two series lead.
- October 8 – In the decisive Game 7, the host Cincinnati Reds defeat the Detroit Tigers, 2–1, to win their second World Series, four games to three. Bobo Newsom—pitching on one day's rest—goes eight innings and surrenders only two runs and seven hits, but he's out-dueled by Paul Derringer.
  - Cincinnati captures its first Fall Classic victory since the infamous Black Sox scandal in 1919. Bill McKechnie becomes the first skipper to win a World Series with two different teams, after capturing the 1925 Series with the Pittsburgh Pirates. On the field, the Reds' triumph is led by Billy Werber (ten hits and four walks in 31 plate appearances), Jimmy Ripple (seven hits, including a homer, and four walks in 25 PAs), and the unsung Jimmie Wilson (six games caught and a .353 batting average, plus a stolen base); Derringer and Bucky Walters each win two games.
- October 18 – MLB officials pledge full support and cooperation with the U.S. military draft as it begins to take effect. "Baseball will do its part," vows Warren Giles, general manager of the world-champion Reds and a World War I veteran. The Selective Service Act currently requires all American men between the ages of 21 and 35 to register with local draft boards for potential induction, training and service in the armed forces. Of current big-league stars, Bob Feller and Hank Greenberg are cited as more vulnerable to calls to service because they are not yet married.
- October 28 – Ossie Vitt, embattled manager of the "crybaby" Cleveland Indians, is fired by the club's board of directors. Known for motivating his team through ridicule, and nervous behavior on the bench, Vitt barely survived a mass player mutiny in June and has sharply criticized his front office and individual players—including Bob Feller—for lack of support and disloyalty since the season ended. The 1940 Indians ultimately came within one game of the American League pennant and Vitt compiled a 262–198 (.570) record with three first-division finishes in his three years at the helm. But the talkative, 50-year-old ex-third baseman will never again manage in the major leagues.

=== November ===
Frank McCormick

- November 6 – The BBWAA elects Hank Greenberg of the pennant-winning Detroit Tigers the American League's Most Valuable Player for the second time in his career. With 16 of 24 first-place votes and 292 points, he outdistances Bob Feller (222 points with six first-place votes) of the league-runnerup Cleveland Indians. Greenberg led the AL in home runs (41) and runs batted in (150) this past season. His previous MVP Award came in 1935.
- November 8 – Clark Griffith, patriarch of the Washington Senators and known as an outspoken opponent of night baseball, changes course and announces that he's investing $130,000 to equip his club's home ballpark with lights. The Senators plan to host seven night contests in 1941.
- November 11 – Brooklyn Dodgers general manager Larry MacPhail acquires starting pitcher Kirby Higbe from the Philadelphia Phillies in exchange for pitchers Bill Crouch and Vito Tamulis, catcher Mickey Livingston and $100,000. Higbe won 14 games this past season for the financially struggling Phillies; in 1941, his 22 victories as a Dodger will lead National League pitchers.
- November 12 – Roger Peckinpaugh gets a second chance to manage the Cleveland Indians, signing a two-year contract to return to the team that fired him on June 8, 1933. The 49-year-old ex-shortstop, a Cleveland native, compiled a 415–402 mark during his first term, which lasted 5½ seasons. He takes over a dissension-riddled club that openly rebelled against ex-skipper Ossie Vitt, yet finished second in 1940.
- November 13
  - Frank McCormick, hard-hitting first baseman of the World Series-champion Cincinnati Reds, is chosen by baseball writers as the National League's Most Valuable Player of 1940. McCormick's 16 first place votes and 274 points eclipse Johnny Mize of the third-place St. Louis Cardinals' 209 points (and six first-place nods). McCormick led the NL in hits (191) and finished second to Mize in runs batted in (127), as his Reds ran away with the pennant by a 12-game margin.
  - After a fifth-place, 75–79 season, owner Philip K. Wrigley shocks Chicago Cubs fans by firing Gabby Hartnett as player–manager and handing the 19-year veteran and future Hall-of-Fame catcher his unconditional release. In 1938, Hartnett had led Chicago to the NL pennant; then, this past August 27, Wrigley had announced he was retaining Hartnett for 1941. As a player, Hartnett, 39, has so far slugged 231 home runs—setting a record for MLB catchers—and appeared in 1,926 games, all as a Cub.
    - Tomorrow, Wrigley will spring a second surprise when he appoints a leading critic of his franchise, sportswriter James T. Gallagher, 36, to replace Charles Weber as the Cubs' general manager.
- November 18 – The Chicago Cubs' major off-season announcements come in threes when Wrigley and Gallagher hire World Series hero Jimmie Wilson as field manager, succeeding Gabby Hartnett. Wilson, 40, came off the Cincinnati Reds' coaching lines to bat .353 and catch all four of the team's victories during October's Fall Classic. Wilson previously managed the woeful 1934–1938 Philadelphia Phillies to a 280–477 (.370) record.
- November 19 – The St. Louis Cardinals purchase the contract of right-hander Tot Pressnell from the Brooklyn Dodgers.
- November 25 – The New York Giants acquire second baseman Joe Orengo from the St. Louis Cardinals in a cash transaction.

=== December ===
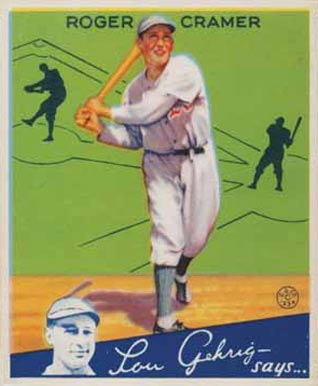
Doc Cramer

- December 3
  - The St. Louis Cardinals sell the contract of third baseman/second baseman Stu Martin, a former National League All-Star, to the Pittsburgh Pirates.
  - The pitching-poor Boston Red Sox deal right-hander Denny Galehouse and southpaw Fritz Ostermueller to the St. Louis Browns in a cash-only transaction. The pair started a total of 36 games for Boston in 1940.
  - At their annual winter meeting, owners of minor-league teams blame radio broadcasts for the marked decline in fan attendance experienced during 1940.
- December 4
  - The Cardinals and their emerging-rival Brooklyn Dodgers make their second major trade of 1940 when Brooklyn acquires starting catcher Mickey Owen from St. Louis for fellow backstop Gus Mancuso, minor-league pitcher John Pintar, and $65,000. Owen, 24, will make four All-Star teams as a Dodger. Although Mancuso, 34, is a popular former Cardinal, the cash payment is key to the trade; says St. Louis owner Sam Breadon: "We had to have money. You can't run a big organization like ours on a home gate of 332,000 admissions."
  - The World Series-champion Cincinnati Reds trade their former starting shortstop and team captain, Billy Myers, 30, to the Chicago Cubs for shortstop Bobby Mattick, 24, and outfielder Jim Gleeson.
- December 5
  - The Pittsburgh Pirates release "Big Poison"—future Hall of Famer and three-time NL batting champion Paul Waner. The 37-year-old outfielder has appeared in 2,154 games over 15 seasons in a Pirate uniform, batting .340 with 2,868 hits, and starring with younger brother Lloyd, nicknamed "Little Poison."
  - The New York Yankees sell the contract of reserve outfielder Jake Powell to the San Francisco Seals of the Pacific Coast League. Powell, 31, played in only 12 games in 1940 after suffering a severe brain concussion when he struck his head on an outfield wall during an April 10 exhibition game in Ashland, Kentucky.
- December 9 – The Brooklyn Dodgers acquire the Cincinnati Reds' former starting third baseman, Lew Riggs, a 1936 NL All-Star, for veteran second baseman Pep Young.
- December 10
  - Major-league owners re-elect Kenesaw Mountain Landis, 74, to a fourth term as Commissioner of Baseball. Landis' contract runs for four years at a salary of $65,000 (equivalent to about $1.5 million in 2026).
  - The New York Giants sign free agent Gabby Hartnett as a player-coach and purchase the contract of outfielder Morrie Arnovich from the champion Cincinnati Reds. Hartnett, a Hall-of-Fame catcher and former skipper of the Chicago Cubs, will bat .300 in limited duty for the 1941 Giants in his final big-league season.
- December 12
  - The Boston Red Sox send five-time All-Star outfielder Doc Cramer, who led the American League in base hits (200) in 1940, to the Washington Senators for Gee Walker, another outfielder; then, they package Walker with pitcher Jim Bagby Jr. and catcher Gene Desautels and deal the trio to the Cleveland Indians for young right-hander Joe Dobson, catcher Frankie Pytlak and infielder Odell Hale. Dobson will win 106 games for Boston.
  - The Bosox also purchase veteran outfielder Pete Fox's contract from the Detroit Tigers.
- December 16
  - The Chicago White Sox acquire third baseman Dario Lodigiani from the Philadelphia Athletics for pitcher Jack Knott.
  - The St. Louis Cardinals deal right-hander Tot Pressnell, whom they acquired from the Brooklyn Dodgers less than a month ago, to the Cincinnati Reds for cash.
- December 18 – The AL champion Detroit Tigers obtain infielder Eric McNair on waivers from the White Sox. In so doing, they comply with the "Yankee Law" imposed by the Junior Circuit a year ago to thwart the "perennial" champ New York Yankees by forbidding its pennant-winner to acquire any player—except through the waiver process. The prohibition was renewed by a vote of league owners at this month's winter meetings. The Bombers finished third in 1940, and the Tigers suffer the consequences.
- December 24 – The Cleveland Indians make a pair of Christmas Eve deals, trading away two alleged ring-leaders of the "Crybaby Rebellion." In one, they sell the contract of veteran pitcher Johnny Allen to the St. Louis Browns for $20,000. In the other, they trade outfielder Ben Chapman to the Washington Senators for left-hander Joe Krakauskas.
- December 28 – The National Baseball Congress, umbrella organization for U.S. semi-professional baseball, will experiment with replacing pitchers in the batting order with an early form of the designated hitter in 1941. The announcement is made by J. G. Taylor Spink, editor and publisher of The Sporting News and an advocate of a rule change that, 32 years later, will be introduced into the American League.
- December 30 – The New York Yankees trade veteran righty Monte Pearson to the Cincinnati Reds for third baseman Don Lang and $20,000. Pearson, 32, was a 1940 AL All-Star; coincidentally, he and Johnny Allen had been traded for each other on December 11, 1935.

== Births ==
=== January ===
- January 4 – Bart Shirley
- January 6 – Elvio Jiménez
- January 7 – Jim Hannan
- January 8 – Dick Kelley
- January 10 – Dave Skaugstad
- January 11 – Hank Fischer
- January 12 – George Kernek
- January 13 – Ron Brand
- January 16
  - Bob Baird
  - Rod Miller
- January 21 – Rich Beck
- January 23 – Dick Burwell

=== February ===
- February 14 – Len Gabrielson
- February 19 – Bill Kelso
- February 21 – Doug Gallagher
- February 25
  - Danny Cater
  - Ron Santo

=== March ===
- March 1 – Larry Brown
- March 6 – Willie Stargell
- March 10 – Mitsuhiro Adachi
- March 13 – Gary Kolb
- March 18 – Tony Martínez
- March 19 – Pete Smith
- March 22 – Dick Ellsworth

=== April ===
- April 3 – José Vidal
- April 5 – Ron Campbell
- April 11 – Dick Wantz
- April 12 – Woodie Fryman
- April 15 – Willie Davis
- April 16 – Garry Roggenburk
- April 21 – Bill Faul
- April 24 – Terry Tata

=== May ===
- May 6 – Bill Hands
- May 10 – John R. Keennan
- May 11 – Harry Fanok
- May 12 – Tom Timmermann
- May 18 – Jim Hicks
- May 20 – Sadaharu Oh

=== June ===
- June 2
  - Horace Clarke
  - Jim Maloney
- June 12 – Del Bates
- June 19 – Isao Harimoto
- June 28 – Gary Wagner

=== July ===
- July 3
  - Coco Laboy
  - César Tovar
- July 8 – Bucky Brandon
- July 10
  - Gene Alley
  - Pete Craig
- July 12
  - Mike Page
  - Jack Warner
- July 13
  - Jack Aker
  - Frank Bork
- July 16 – Tom Metcalf
- July 18 – Joe Torre
- July 21
  - John Bateman
  - Denis Menke
- July 23 – Hank Allen
- July 24 – Ethan Blackaby

=== August ===
- August 3 – Roger Repoz
- August 5 – Ossie Chavarría
- August 13 – Tony Cloninger
- August 15
  - Arlo Brunsberg
  - José Santiago
- August 18 – Paul Popovich
- August 25 – Don Wallace
- August 28 – Tom Satriano
- August 31
  - Ramón Hernández
  - Cleo James

=== September ===
- September 1 – Pat House
- September 10 – Bob Chance
- September 11 – Jackie Hernández
- September 12
  - Rich Barry
  - Mickey Lolich
- September 15 – Frank Linzy
- September 17 – Cisco Carlos
- September 21 – Jerry Fosnow
- September 24 – Curt Motton

=== October ===
- October 1 – John Schuerholz
- October 7 – Morrie Steevens
- October 9 – Joe Pepitone
- October 10
  - Larry Maxie
  - Grover Powell
- October 12 – Glenn Beckert
- October 14
  - Tommy Harper
  - Billy Sorrell
- October 16 – Dave DeBusschere
- October 27 – Héctor Valle

=== November ===
- November 8 – Joe Nossek
- November 9 – Don Loun
- November 16 – Buster Narum
- November 18 – Cal Koonce
- November 20 – Jeffrey Loria
- November 21 – Tommy McCraw
- November 23
  - Billy Ott
  - Luis Tiant
- November 25 – Dennis Aust

=== December ===
- December 1 – Cecil Perkins
- December 3 – Chico Salmon
- December 5 – John Papa
- December 8 – Brant Alyea
- December 10 – Weldon Bowlin
- December 12 – Tom Brown
- December 13 – Nate Oliver
- December 20 – Thad Tillotson
- December 22 – Elrod Hendricks
- December 26 – Ray Sadecki

== Deaths ==
=== January ===
- January 3
  - Mike Mahoney, 88, first baseman who played from 1897 to 1898 for the Boston Beaneaters and St. Louis Browns.
  - Parke Swartzel, 74, pitcher for the 1889 Kansas City Cowboys of the American Association (AA), then a major league.
- January 5 – Charlie Kelly, 77, third baseman/shortstop who briefly appeared for the 1883 Philadelphia Quakers of the National League and the 1886 Philadelphia Athletics of the AA.
- January 12 – Ed Keas, 77, pitcher for the 1888 Cleveland Blues (AA) .
- January 20 – Wally Andrews, 60, infielder who played with the American Association's Louisville Eclipse in 1884 and Louisville Colonels in 1888.
- January 22 – Charlie Berry, 79, second baseman who played for three teams in the Union Association in 1884, the UA's only season of existence as a major league.
- January 31 – Red Fisher, 52, left fielder who played in 1910 with the St. Louis Browns of the American League.

=== February ===
- February 5
  - Frank Decker, 83, catcher/infielder who played with the Syracuse Stars (National League) in 1879 and for the St. Louis Brown Stockings (American Association) in 1882.
  - Byrd Lynn, 50, Chicago White Sox catcher from 1916 through 1920 who served as a backup for Hall of Famer Ray Schalk; member of 1917 World Series champions.
- February 6 – Hiram White, 75, catcher for Washington (NL) in 1887.
- February 13 – Walter Barnes, 79, sports editor for several Boston newspapers from 1891 to 1933 who was that city's first regular sports columnist.
- February 15
  - Chick Fulmer, 89, shortstop who played for eight teams in three different leagues during 11 seasons from 1871 to 1884.
  - Ray Morgan, 50, second baseman who was part of a stellar double play combo along with shortstop George McBride for the Washington Senators from 1911 through 1918.
- February 16 – Alex Albritton, 48, pitcher who hurled in the Negro leagues between 1918 and 1925.
- February 21 – John Taber, 71, pitcher for the 1890 Boston Beaneaters (NL).
- February 26 – Matt Broderick, 62, second baseman for the Brooklyn Superbas (NL) in 1903.

=== March ===
- March 2 – Matt Kilroy, 73, pitcher for six teams in ten seasons (1886–1894, 1898), who won 46 games in 1887 for the Baltimore Orioles (American Association); in 1886, he hurled a no-hitter in 1886 and struck out 513 batters, most ever in a single season and 72 ahead of second-place Charles Radbourn, who fanned 441 in 1884.
- March 6 – Marshall Locke, 82, outfielder for the 1884 Indianapolis Hoosiers (AA).
- March 7 – Johnny Johnston, 49, left fielder who played with the St. Louis Browns in 1913.
- March 13 – Ira Flagstead, 46, outfielder with a strong arm and a reliable glove who played for the Detroit Tigers, Boston Red Sox, Washington Senators and Pittsburgh Pirates in a span of 14 seasons from 1917 to 1930, hitting .290 with 40 home runs and 450 RBI in 1,218 career games; led all American League outfielders in assists in 1923 (31) and 1925 (24), and best fielding average in 1927 (.986).
- March 22 – Libe Washburn, 29, outfielder and pitcher who played from 1902 to 1903 with the New York Giants and Philadelphia Phillies.
- March 30
  - Roy Crabb, 49, pitcher for the Chicago White Sox and Philadelphia Athletics during the 1912 season.
  - George McQuillan, 55, pitcher for the Philadelphia Phillies, Cincinnati Reds, Pittsburgh Pirates and Cleveland Indians during ten seasons from 1907 to 1918, who in 1907 set one of the longest-lived records in Major League history when he pitched 25 innings before giving up the first earned run of his career, a feat broken by Brad Ziegler in 2008.

=== April ===
- April 8
  - Bill Abstein, 57, first baseman who played for the Pittsburgh Pirates and St. Louis Browns in part of three seasons spanning 1906–1910.
  - Dave Murphy, 63, shortstop for the 1905 Boston Beaneaters.
- April 10 – Tom Seaton, 52, pitcher for the Philadelphia Phillies, Brooklyn Tip-Tops, Newark Pepper and Chicago Cubs in six seasons from 1912 to 1917, who posted a record of 93–63 and a 3.14 ERA in 231 career games; led the National League in wins and strikeouts during the 1913 season.
- April 12 – Fred Klobedanz, 68, pitcher for the Boston Beaneaters in a span of five seasons from 1896 to 1902, who was a member of the Boston team that clinched the National League pennant in 1897 and 1898 and led the league in winning percentage in 1897.
- April 22 – Alex Hardy, 62, Canadian-born pitcher who played for the Chicago Cubs/Orphans (NL) in 1902 and 1903.
- April 28 – Henry Cote, 76, pitcher for the Louisville Colonels (NL) in 1894 and 1895.
- April 30 – Patsy Dougherty, 63, outfielder for the Boston Americans and Chicago White Sox clubs that won the World Series in 1903 and 1906 respectively; the first player to hit two home runs in a single World Series game with a pair in 1903; led American League with 47 stolen bases in 1908.

=== May ===
- May 5
  - Otis "Cat" Francis, 49, second baseman who played in Black baseball and the Negro leagues between 1901 and 1920.
  - Bill Wise, 79, pitcher/outfielder who played for the Baltimore Orioles (American Association) in 1882, Washington Nationals (Union Association) in 1884, and the Washington Nationals (National League) in 1886.
- May 8 – Chick Fraser, 66, pitcher for seven teams in 14 seasons from 1896 through 1909, most prominently for the 1907 and 1908 Chicago Cubs clubs that won the World Series; hurled a no-hitter in 1903 and ranks second on the all-time list of most hit batsmen by a Major League Baseball pitcher.
- May 14 – Harry Gaspar, 57, pitcher who played from 1909 through 1912 for the Cincinnati Reds.
- May 16 – Spike Shannon, 62, outfielder over parts of five seasons from 1904 to 1908 with the St. Louis Cardinals, New York Giants and Pittsburgh Pirates, who led the NL for the most runs scored in 1907.

=== June ===
- June 1 – Logan Drake, 40, pitcher who made ten total appearances for 1922–1924 Cleveland Indians.
- June 3
  - Robert Griffin, 27, pitcher who appeared in three games for the 1931 Chicago American Giants of the Negro National League.
  - Billy Kelly, 54, catcher who worked in 104 career games for the St. Louis Cardinals and Pittsburgh Pirates between 1910 and 1913.
- June 4 – Phil Baker, 83, first baseman/catcher for the 19th-century Baltimore Orioles (1883) and Washington Nationals (1884, 1886).
- June 6 – Marty Simpson, 84, second baseman who as a teenager played four games for the Baltimore Marylands of the National Association between May 14 and July 11, 1873.
- June 16 – Bill Hawes, 86, outfielder/first baseman for Boston (National League) in 1879 and Cincinnati (Union Association) in 1884.
- June 19 – Ed Pabst, 72, outfielder for the 1890 Philadelphia Athletics and St. Louis Browns (the original, MLB-level American Association).
- June 24
  - Bert Adams, 49, reserve catcher for the 1910–1912 Cleveland Naps and 1915–1919 Philadelphia Phillies.
  - Axel Lindstrom, 44, pitcher who appeared in one game on October 3, 1916, for the Philadelphia Athletics; one of five natives of Sweden to play in the major leagues.
- June 26
  - Billy Reid, 83, Canadian second baseman who played for Baltimore (1883) and Allegheny City (1884) of the American Association.
  - Jimmie Savage, 56, outfielder for the 1912 Philadelphia Phillies and the "outlaw" Federal League's 1914–1915 Pittsburgh Rebels.
- June 27 – Frank Thompson, 44, third baseman who appeared in 22 games for the 1920 St. Louis Browns.

=== July ===
- July 3 – John Stafford, 70, pitcher who appeared in two games for the 1893 Cleveland Spiders.
- July 5 – George Yeager, 66, catcher and all-around utilityman who played in 168 games for five big-league teams, primarily the Boston Beaneaters, between 1896 and 1902.
- July 13 – Ollie Tucker, 38, outfielder for the 1927 Washington Senators and 1928 Cleveland Indians who appeared in 34 MLB games; minor-league star who batted .335 lifetime with 2,496 hits in 2,067 games between 1921 and 1935.
- July 16 – Bill Leith, 67, pitcher who hurled one game in the majors for Washington (National League) on September 25, 1899.
- July 19 – John Heileman, 67, third baseman who played in five games for the 1901 Cincinnati Reds.
- July 22 – Charlie Swindells, 61, catcher and Stanford University grad who played in three games for the St. Louis Cardinals in September 1904.
- July 27 – Tom Williams, 69, pitcher/outfielder for the 1892–1893 Cleveland Spiders.
- July 28
  - Red Ehret, 71, pitcher for five MLB teams between 1888 and 1898; bounced back from losing 29 games in 1889 to winning 25 in 1890 during his time with the Louisville Colonels (American Association).
  - Stan Yerkes, 65, right-hander who appeared in 45 total games for the Baltimore of (American League) in 1901 and St. Louis of (National League) from 1901–1903; led NL hurlers in games lost (21) in 1902.

=== August ===
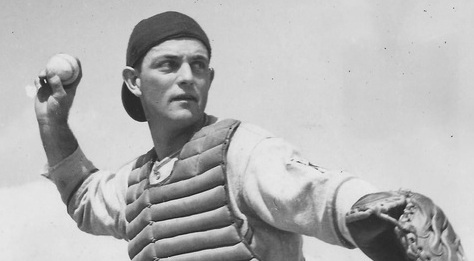
Willard Hershberger

- August 3 – Willard Hershberger, 30, Cincinnati Reds' reserve catcher who appeared in 160 games backing up Ernie Lombardi between April 19, 1938, and his death; committed suicide in his hotel room as the Reds were visiting the Boston Bees during a weekend series; he was hitting .309 in 48 games, and .316 lifetime, when he died; the Reds dedicated the 1940 season to his memory, then won NL pennant by 12 games and the seven-game 1940 World Series. (See Events for this day above.)
- August 4 – George Dixon, 44, catcher whose career in Black baseball and the Negro National League spanned 1916 to 1934.
- August 5 – Ed Bruyette, 65, who appeared in 26 games, most of them as a center fielder, for the 1901 Milwaukee Brewers of the American League.
- August 6 – George Johnson, 50, center fielder who played primarily for the Hilldale Club (Eastern Colored League) between 1918 and 1927.
- August 12 – Mitchell Murray, 44, catcher who played for a dozen seasons in the Negro National League, primarily with the St. Louis Stars and Chicago American Giants, between 1920 and 1932.
- August 13 – Buck Stanley, 50, left-handed pitcher who worked in four games for the 1911 Philadelphia Phillies.
- August 14 – Charlie Hollocher, 44, shortstop for the 1918–1924 Chicago Cubs, appearing in 760 career games; member of 1918 NL champs who batted .304 lifetime with 894 career hits.
- August 17 – Bock Baker, 62, pitcher who worked in four total games for Philadelphia and Cleveland during the American League's inaugural 1901 season. (Exact date of death unconfirmed.)
- August 21 – Ernest Lawrence Thayer, 77, newspaper editor whose poem "Casey at the Bat" became a staple of baseball culture almost immediately upon its publishing in the San Francisco Examiner in June 1888.
- August 23 – Sylvester "Hooks" Foreman, 45, catcher for six Negro leagues teams, notably the Kansas City Monarchs, between 1921 and 1932.
- August 24 – Ed Hallinan, 52, shortstop/second baseman who played in 80 total games for the 1911–1912 St. Louis Browns.
- August 28 – Charlie Johnson, 55, outfielder for the 1908 Philadelphia Phillies.

=== September ===
- September 1 – Gus Dundon, 66, second baseman for the 1904–1906 Chicago White Sox who batted only .202 lifetime; a member of the 1906 "Hitless Wonders," he appeared in 33 regular-season games (and batted only .135) as the ChiSox captured the AL pennant; he did not appear in the "All-Chicago" 1906 World Series, famously won by the underdog Pale Hose.
- September 2 – Johnny Welch, 33, right-handed pitcher who worked in 172 games for the Chicago Cubs, Boston Red Sox and Pittsburgh Pirates between 1926 and 1936.
- September 10 – Bill Shipke, 57, third baseman for the 1906 Cleveland Naps and the 1907–1909 Washington Senators.
- September 14 – Andy Knox, 76, first baseman for the 1890 Philadelphia Athletics (American Association).
- September 15 – Ed Yewell, 78, outfielder/infielder for the 1884 Washington Nationals.
- September 21 – Billy Otterson, 78, shortstop who appeared in 30 games for Brooklyn (AA) in 1887.
- September 25 – Mike Jordan, 77, outfielder for "Allegheny City" (Pittsburgh) of the National League in 1890.

=== October ===
- October 5 – Crazy Schmit, 74, pitcher/outfielder who hurled in 54 games for five teams over five seasons (1890, 1892–1893, 1899, 1902); posted horrific 7–36 lifetime record, including a 2–17 season for the 1899 Cleveland Spiders, the consensus worst team (at 20–134) in MLB history.
- October 9 – Bill Massey, 70, first baseman for the 1894 Cincinnati Reds who appeared in 23 games.
- October 17 – George Davis, 70, Hall of Fame shortstop for the Cleveland Spiders, New York Giants and Chicago White Sox in 20 seasons spanning 1890–1909, who hit over .300 in nine consecutive seasons from 1893 to 1901, fashioned a then-record 33-game hitting streak in 1893, and set Major League records for the most career hits (2,665) and RBI (1,437) by a switch-hitter, while leading the "Hitless Wonder" White Sox in their victory over the Chicago Cubs in the 1906 World Series.
- October 18 – Mack Heller, 30, first baseman for Monroe (Negro Southern League) in 1932.
- October 22 – Ed Pryor, 44, second baseman for the New York Lincoln Giants (Eastern Colored League) in 1925.
- October 23 – Harry Krause, 52, left-handed pitcher who posted an 18–8 won–lost mark, with an American League-best 1.39 earned run average, for the 1909 Philadelphia Athletics, then was a member of Connie Mack's 1910 and 1911 World Series champions.
- October 27 – Blanchett Moody, 28, pitcher who hurled for the 1940 Birmingham Black Barons (Negro American League).

=== November ===
- November 3 – Joe Burke, 72, third baseman for the St. Louis (1890) and Cincinnati (1891) of the American Association.
- November 5 – Bill Mellor, 66, first baseman for Baltimore (American League) in 1902.
- November 8 – James Womack, 39, first baseman/outfielder who played in the Negro National League and East–West League in 1928 and 1932–1933.
- November 9 – George Bird, 90, outfielder for Rockford of the National Association (predecessor of the National League) in 1871.

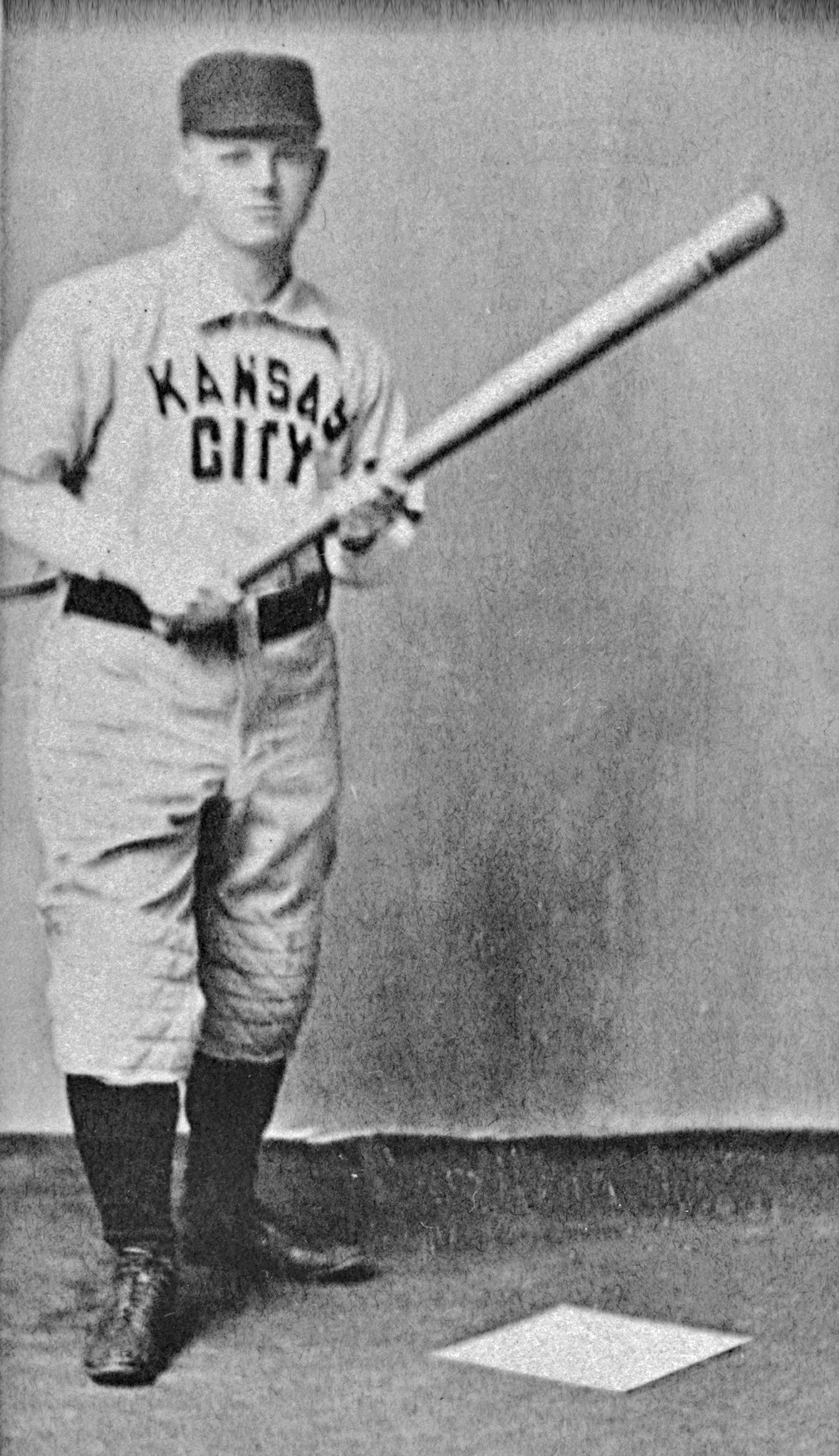
Billy Hamilton

- November 12 – Joe Quinn, 75, second baseman and the first native of Australia to play in the majors; appeared in 1,772 games over 17 seasons (1884–1886, 1888–1901) for eight different clubs, primarily the St. Louis Browns and Boston Beaneaters of the National League.
- November 14 – George Clark, 49, left-handed pitcher for the 1913 New York Yankees.
- November 18 – John Harkins, 81, pitcher and occasional outfielder for Cleveland (NL) and Baltimore (AA) between 1884 and 1888; led NL in games lost (32) in 1884.

=== December ===
- December 7 – Harry Eells, 60, pitcher who worked in 14 games for the 1906 Cleveland Naps.
- December 15 – "Sliding Billy" Hamilton, 74, Hall of Fame center fielder and a prolific batsman who hit better than .300 in 12 successive seasons en route to a career mark of .344, including two batting crowns; collected eleven 100-run seasons with a record 192 in 1894, 914 career stolen bases, a single-season total of 111 steals in 1891 and a single-game of seven in 1894; ended his career as one of only three big leaguers whose runs scored (1,691) exceeded his games played (1,578).
- December 18 – John Kiley, 81, left fielder/pitcher who played for Washington (American Association) in 1884 and Boston (National League) in 1891.
- December 22:
  - Patsy McGaffigan, 52, infielder who played in 73 games for the 1917–1918 Philadelphia Phillies.
  - Bill Schwartz, 76, catcher/outfielder for Columbus (AA) in 1883 and Cincinnati (Union Association) in 1884.
- December 30 – Bill Childress, 73, pitcher who worked in one game for Louisville (NL) on July 27, 1895.
