= 2006 Baseball Hall of Fame balloting =

Elections to the Baseball Hall of Fame

National Baseball

Hall of Fame and Museum
- New inductees: 18
- via BBWAA: 1
- via Committee on African-American Baseball: 17
- Total inductees: 278
- Induction date: July 30, 2006

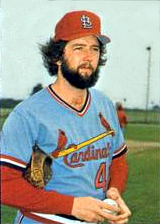
2006 BBWAA inductee Bruce Sutter

Elections to the Baseball Hall of Fame for 2006 proceeded in keeping with rules enacted in 2001, augmented by a special election; the result was the largest class of inductees (18) in the Hall's history, including the first woman elected, Effa Manley.

The Baseball Writers' Association of America (BBWAA) held an election to select from among recent players, voting Bruce Sutter into the Hall. On July 26, 2005, the Hall announced that its board of directors had approved a special election to be held in 2006, by the Committee on African-American Baseball, of Negro leagues and pre-Negro leagues candidates. The Committee selected 17 players and executives for induction.

The Veterans Committee did not hold an election; the 2001 rules changes provided that elections for players retired over 20 years would be held every other year, with elections of non-players (managers, umpires and executives) held every fourth year. The Committee voted in 2005 on players who were active no later than 1983; there was no 2005 election for non-players. Elections in both categories were held in 2007.

Induction ceremonies in Cooperstown were held July 30 with Commissioner Bud Selig presiding.

== BBWAA election ==
The BBWAA was again authorized to elect players active in 1986 or later, but not after 2000; the ballot, announced on November 28, 2005, included candidates from the 2005 ballot who received at least 5% of the vote but were not elected, along with selected players, chosen by a screening committee, whose last appearance was in 2000. All 10-year members of the BBWAA were eligible to vote.

Voters were instructed to cast votes for up to 10 candidates; any candidate receiving votes on at least 75% of the ballots would be honored with induction to the Hall. Results of the 2006 election by the BBWAA were announced on January 10. The ballot consisted of 29 players; 520 ballots were cast, with 390 votes required for election. A total of 2933 individual votes were cast, an average of 5.64 per ballot. Those candidates receiving less than 5% of the vote will not appear on future BBWAA ballots, but may eventually be considered by the Veterans Committee.

Pete Rose, who last played in 1986, was again not included on the ballot due to his banishment from baseball in what was theoretically his final opportunity, as players retired over 20 years can not be considered by the BBWAA under current rules; however, Hall of Fame chair Jane Forbes Clark indicated prior to the ballot announcement that if Rose is ever reinstated by Major League Baseball, the Hall's board of directors might review the rules in light of the fact that Rose never had an opportunity to appear on a BBWAA ballot.

Candidates who were eligible for the first time are indicated here with a dagger (†). The candidate who received at least 75% of the vote and was elected is indicated in bold italics; candidates who have since been selected in subsequent elections are indicated in italics. The candidates who received less than 5% of the vote, thus becoming ineligible for future BBWAA consideration, are indicated with an asterisk (*).

Player	Votes	Percent	Change	Year
**Bruce Sutter**	**400**	**76.9**	▲10.3%	13th
Jim Rice	337	64.8	▲5.4%	12th
Goose Gossage	336	64.6	▲9.4%	7th
Andre Dawson	317	61.0	▲8.7%	5th
Bert Blyleven	277	53.3	▲12.5%	9th
Lee Smith	234	45.0	▲6.8%	4th
Jack Morris	214	41.2	▲7.9%	7th
Tommy John	154	29.6	▲5.8%	12th
Steve Garvey	135	26.0	▲5.5%	14th
Alan Trammell	92	17.7	▲0.8%	5th
Dave Parker	76	14.6	▲2.1%	10th
Dave Concepción	65	12.5	▲1.9%	13th
Don Mattingly	64	12.3	▲0.9%	6th
Orel Hershiser†	58	11.2	-	1st
Dale Murphy	56	10.8	▲0.4%	8th
Albert Belle†	40	7.7	-	1st
Will Clark†*	23	4.4	-	1st
Dwight Gooden†*	17	3.3	-	1st
Willie McGee*	12	2.3	▼2.7%	2nd
Ozzie Guillén†*	5	1.0	-	1st
Hal Morris†*	5	1.0	-	1st
Gary Gaetti†*	4	0.8	-	1st
John Wetteland†*	4	0.8	-	1st
Rick Aguilera†*	3	0.6	-	1st
Gregg Jefferies†*	2	0.4	-	1st
Doug Jones†*	2	0.4	-	1st
Walt Weiss†*	1	0.2	-	1st
Gary DiSarcina†*	0	0.0	-	1st
Alex Fernandez†*	0	0.0	-	1st

Key
	Elected to the Hall of Fame on this ballot (named in **bold italics**).
	Elected subsequently, as of 2026 (named in plain italics).
	Renominated for the 2007 BBWAA election by adequate performance on this ballot and has not been elected, as of 2026.
	Eliminated from annual BBWAA consideration by poor performance or expiration on this ballot and has not been elected, as of 2026.
†	First time on the BBWAA ballot.
*	Eliminated from annual BBWAA consideration by poor performance or expiration on this ballot.

The newly eligible candidates included 18 All-Stars, six of whom were not on the ballot, representing 46 selections. Only two players were named to five or more All-Star Games: Will Clark (six times) and Albert Belle (five). Included in the class were three Rookie of the Year Award winners (Dwight Gooden, Ozzie Guillén and Walt Weiss) and two Cy Young Award winners (Orel Hershiser and Dwight Gooden).

Players eligible for the first time who were not included on the ballot were: Rich Amaral, Tim Belcher, Stan Belinda, Gerónimo Berroa, Sean Berry, Mark Clark, Dave Eiland, Kevin Elster, Eric Gunderson, Juan Guzmán, Carlos Hernández, Thomas Howard, Jeff Huson, Lance Johnson, Scott Kamieniecki, Roberto Kelly, Jim Leyritz, Mike Maddux, Mickey Morandini, Mike Munoz, Jaime Navarro, Charlie O'Brien, Steve Ontiveros, Luis Polonia, Jim Poole, Jeff Reed, Heathcliff Slocumb, Mike Stanley, Lenny Webster, and Mark Whiten.

== The Committee on African-American Baseball ==
In July 2000, the Hall was given a $250,000 grant from Major League Baseball to begin a comprehensive study on African Americans in baseball from 1860–1960, with the hope of enhancing the Hall's collections in these areas. In February 2001, the Hall selected three historians – Dr. Larry Hogan, Dick Clark and Larry Lester – to conduct the study, which involved over 50 other researchers and authors. The resulting study was a narrative, bibliography, and statistical database, including 3,000 day-by-day records, league leaders and all-time leaders, collected from box scores in 128 newspapers of sanctioned Negro league games played from 1920–1954. The box scores reflect almost 100% of games of the 1920s, over 90% of the games played in the 1930s, and 50-70% of games in the 1940s and 1950s. In February 2006, National Geographic published a book featuring material from the study, in conjunction with the Hall, called Shades of Glory; it covers not only the development of the game, but also its impact within the African American community. Pride and Passion, an exhibit focusing on the history of African American baseball, debuted at the Hall's museum in April 2006.

=== Screening process ===
In July 2005 the Hall's board of directors appointed two expert committees, a screening committee of five and a voting committee of twelve. Former Commissioner of Baseball Fay Vincent served as the non-voting chairman of both committees and Hall of Famer Frank Robinson served as an advisor and assistant to Vincent and the committees. Written recommendations from fans and non-committee members were accepted through October 2005 (stage one). From the many candidates recommended, 94 were selected for consideration by the screening committee. These second-stage nominations were the first ones published (stage two).

Newt Allen – Walter Ball – Sam Bankhead – Bernardo Baró – John Beckwith – William Bell – Ed Bolden – Chet Brewer – Chester Brooks – Dave Brown – Larry Brown – Ray Brown – Willard Brown – Bill Byrd – Walter Cannady – Bill Cash – Phil Cockrell – Pancho Coimbre – Andy Cooper – Bingo DeMoss – Rap Dixon – John Donaldson – Frank Duncan – José Fernández – Bud Fowler – Jelly Gardner – Charlie Grant – Frank Grant – Gus Greenlee – Vic Harris – Pete Hill – Bill Holland – Sammy T. Hughes – Fats Jenkins – Sam Jethroe – Home Run Johnson – Heavy Johnson – Henry Kimbro – Frank Leland – Dick Lundy – Jimmie Lyons – Biz Mackey – Dave Malarcher – Abe Manley – Effa Manley – Max Manning – Oliver Marcell – J. B. Martin – Horacio Martínez – Verdell Mathis – Dan McClellan – Hurley McNair – José Méndez – Minnie Miñoso – Bill Monroe – Dobie Moore – Alejandro Oms – Buck O'Neil – Red Parnell – John Patterson – Jap Payne – Bruce Petway – Spottswood Poles – Alex Pompez – Cumberland Posey – Alex Radcliffe – Ted Radcliffe – Dick Redding – Neal Robinson – Nat Rogers – Louis Santop – George Scales – Chino Smith – Clarence Smith – George Stovey – Mule Suttles – Ben Taylor – C. I. Taylor – Candy Jim Taylor – Cristóbal Torriente – Juan Vargas – Moses Walker – Frank Warfield – Chaney White – Sol White – Frank Wickware – Wabishaw Wiley – J. L. Wilkinson – Clarence Williams – George Williams – George Wilson – Jud Wilson – Nip Winters – Bill Wright

Using statistics and other historical material from the Hall's earlier study, the screening committee met in November at Dodgertown in Vero Beach, Florida to create two ballots – one for Negro league players, managers, umpires and executives, and another for candidates whose careers mainly preceded the leagues—this is, before 1920. The committee members and listed areas of expertise were Adrian Burgos (Latin America), Dick Clark (Negro leagues), Larry Hogan (overall history), Larry Lester (Negro leagues) and Jim Overmyer (eastern teams and 19th century). They cut the 94 nominees to ten pre-Negro leagues and 29 Negro leagues candidates (stage three).

The following candidates appeared on the two final ballots:

Negro leagues:

Newt Allen – John Beckwith – William Bell – Chet Brewer – Ray Brown – Willard Brown – Bill Byrd – Andy Cooper – Rap Dixon – John Donaldson – Sammy T. Hughes – Fats Jenkins – Dick Lundy – Biz Mackey – Effa Manley – Oliver Marcelle – Minnie Miñoso – Dobie Moore – Alejandro Oms – Buck O'Neil – Red Parnell – Alex Pompez – Cumberland Posey – George Scales – Mule Suttles – Candy Jim Taylor – C. I. Taylor – Cristóbal Torriente – J. L. Wilkinson – Jud Wilson

Pre-Negro leagues:

Frank Grant – Pete Hill – Home Run Johnson – José Méndez – Spottswood Poles – Dick Redding – Louis Santop – Ben Taylor – Sol White

According to Hall president Dale Petroskey, "The screening committee did a great job of handling the first step of narrowing the list of candidates to those who should be seriously considered for election to the Hall of Fame." Vincent added, "I'm very satisfied with the work done by the screening committee. The committee members had some difficult choices to make, but because they are extremely knowledgeable, had strong research at their disposal and spent a great deal of time reviewing all candidates thoroughly, they did a tremendous job. The final ballots represent players, managers, executives and builders who are top-tier candidates and worthy of review for consideration for election to the Hall of Fame."

=== Final ballots ===
The 39 candidates on the final ballots were announced on November 21. The voting committee met in Tampa, Florida on February 25 for two days of discussion, after which they cast paper ballots with a "yes" or "no" for every candidate. Those who received "yes" votes on at least 75% of the ballots would be elected. The seven additional voting committee members and listed areas of expertise were Todd Bolton (Latin America), Greg Bond (19th century), Ray Doswell (overall history), Leslie Heaphy (women's history, Negro leagues), Rob Ruck (Negro leagues eastern teams), Sammy Miller (eastern and western teams), and Robert W. Peterson (overall history). Ruck replaced Neil Lanctot, author of two books on Negro league baseball. Peterson died on February 11, but he had submitted an absentee ballot two days earlier and the other committee members voted unanimously to accept it.

The results were announced February 27: seventeen new members had been elected to the Hall. All were deceased. The Newark-based executive Effa Manley would be the first woman in the Hall of Fame.

- Ray Brown, pitcher for the Homestead Grays from 1932 to 1945 who had a career .704 winning percentage and a one-hitter in the 1944 Negro League World Series.
- Willard Brown, right fielder for the Kansas City Monarchs from 1936 to 1950 who won several home run titles and was the first black player to hit a home run in the American League.
- Andy Cooper, pitcher with the Detroit Stars and Monarchs from 1920 to 1941 who had a career .671 winning percentage and held the Negro leagues' career record for saves.
- Frank Grant, second baseman in integrated minor leagues and with all-black teams from 1886 to 1903.
- Pete Hill, center fielder from 1899 to 1926 who batted over .300 ten times.
- Biz Mackey, catcher from 1920 to 1947 who batted .322 lifetime and managed the Newark Eagles to the 1946 Negro League World Series title.
- Effa Manley, owner of the Newark Eagles from 1935 to 1948.
- José Méndez, pitcher with the Cuban Stars (West), All Nations, and Monarchs teams from 1908 to 1926 who also managed the Monarchs from 1920 to 1926, winning three pennants.
- Alex Pompez, owner of the Cuban Stars (East) and New York Cubans from 1916 to 1950.
- Cum Posey, owner of the Homestead Grays from 1920 to 1946.
- Louis Santop, catcher from 1909 to 1926 who was one of the sport's earliest home run sluggers.
- Mule Suttles, first baseman from 1923 to 1944 who batted over .300 thirteen times and was known for his home run power.
- Ben Taylor, first baseman from 1908 to 1929, notably with the Indianapolis ABCs, who batted .300 ten times and also managed several teams.
- Cristóbal Torriente, center fielder from 1913 to 1928 who batted .339 in the Negro leagues and was the Cuban League's all-time leading hitter with a .350 average.
- Sol White, pioneer who played as an infielder for over 20 years, wrote the first significant history of black baseball, and later helped found the Negro National League.
- J. L. Wilkinson, owner of the All Nations and Kansas City Monarchs teams from 1912 to 1948.
- Jud Wilson, third baseman for the Baltimore Black Sox, Homestead Grays and Philadelphia Stars from 1922 to 1945 who batted .351 lifetime.

Vote counts were not announced but the twelve-person committee evidently cast at least 153 "yes" votes (seventeen times nine) or at least 13 per voter on average. The inductees brought to 35 the number of Negro leagues and pre-leagues figures elected to the Hall, the first being Satchel Paige in 1971.

According to the contemporary press release by the Hall of Fame ["Seventeen ..."], its chairwoman Jane Forbes Clark stated, "The Board of Directors is extremely pleased with how this project has evolved over the last five years – culminating in today's vote. Over the last two days, this committee has held discussions in great detail, utilizing the research and statistics now available to determine who deserves baseball's highest honor – a plaque in the Hall of Fame Gallery in Cooperstown." Major League Baseball had funded the prior scholarly study. Its commissioner Bud Selig said, "I applaud the National Baseball Hall of Fame for conducting this special election of former Negro league stars, and I heartily congratulate those who were elected. ... Eighteen Negro league stars had been elected prior to today's vote, but previous committees had overlooked many who were deserving. Major League Baseball is proud to have played a part in a process that has corrected some of those omissions."

== J. G. Taylor Spink Award ==
Tracy Ringolsby received the J. G. Taylor Spink Award honoring a baseball writer. (The award was voted at the December 2005 meeting of the BBWAA, dated 2005, and conferred in the summer 2006 ceremonies.)

The Spink Award has been presented by the BBWAA at the annual summer induction ceremonies since 1962. It recognizes a sportswriter "for meritorious contributions to baseball writing". The recipients are not members of the Hall of the Fame, merely featured in a permanent exhibit at the National Baseball Museum, but writers and broadcasters commonly call them "Hall of Fame writers" or words to that effect. Living recipients were members of the Veterans Committee for elections in odd years 2003 to 2007.

Three final candidates, selected by a BBWAA committee, were named on July 12, 2005 in Detroit in conjunction with All-Star Game activities; the finalists were: Joe Goddard of the Chicago Sun-Times; the late Vern Plagenhoef, who covered the Detroit Tigers for Michigan's Booth Newspaper Group; and Tracy Ringolsby, who has covered the Colorado Rockies for the Rocky Mountain News since 1993 and has written on baseball for 30 years. All 10-year members of the BBWAA were eligible to cast ballots in voting conducted by mail in November.

On December 7, Tracy Ringolsby was announced as the recipient, having received 225 votes out of the 429 ballots cast, with Goddard receiving 128 votes and Plagenhoef receiving 76.

== Ford C. Frick Award ==
Gene Elston received the Ford C. Frick Award honoring a baseball broadcaster.

The Frick Award has been presented at the annual summer induction ceremonies since 1978. It recognizes a broadcaster for "major contributions to baseball". The recipients are not members of the Hall of the Fame, merely featured in a permanent exhibit at the National Baseball Museum, but writers and broadcasters commonly call them "Hall of Fame broadcaster" or words to that effect. Living honorees were members of the Veterans Committee for elections in odd years 2003 to 2007.

On December 6, 2005, the ten finalists were announced. In accordance with guidelines established in 2003, seven were chosen by a research committee at the museum: Tom Cheek, Ken Coleman, Dizzy Dean, Gene Elston, Tony Kubek, Denny Matthews, and Graham McNamee. Three additional candidates – Bill King, Dave Niehaus, and Jacques Doucet – were selected through results of voting by fans conducted throughout November at the Hall's official website; more than 105,000 votes were cast. Photos and profiles of the ten candidates can be found at the Hall's website.

On February 21, Gene Elston was announced as the 2006 recipient ; best known for his 25 years of broadcasting Houston Astros games from 1962 to 1986, he was selected in a January vote by a committee composed of the 14 living recipients, along with six additional broadcasting historians or columnists: Bob Costas (NBC), Barry Horn (The Dallas Morning News), Stan Isaacs (formerly of New York Newsday), Ted Patterson (historian), Curt Smith (historian) and Larry Stewart (Los Angeles Times). The ballots were cast prior to the death of Curt Gowdy on February 20. The members voted by mail, and based the selection on the following criteria: longevity; continuity with a club; honors, including national assignments such as the World Series and All-Star Games; and popularity with fans.
