= Effa Manley =

American baseball executive (1897-1981)

- Born: March 27, 1897; Philadelphia, Pennsylvania, U.S.
- Died: April 16, 1981 (aged 84); Los Angeles, California, U.S.
- Occupation: Owner of the Newark Eagles of the Negro leagues
- Spouses: George Bush (m. 1920, divorced); Abraham Lincoln Manley (m. 1933; died 1952); Henry Moton Clinton (m. 1953; div. 1954); Charles Wesley Alexander (m. 1956; div. 1957)
- Baseball career

Career highlights and awards
- Negro World Series champion (1946)

Member of the National

Baseball Hall of Fame
- Induction: 2006
- Election method: Committee on African-American Baseball

Effa Louise Manley (née Brooks; March 27, 1897 – April 16, 1981) was an American sports executive. She co-owned the Newark Eagles baseball franchise in the Negro leagues with her husband Abe Manley from 1935 to 1948. Throughout that time, she served as the team's business manager and fulfilled many of her husband's duties as treasurer of the Negro National League. In 2006, she posthumously became the first (and, as of August 2026, only) woman inducted into the National Baseball Hall of Fame, chosen by the Special Committee on Negro Leagues for her work as an executive.

== Early life ==
Manley was born in Philadelphia, Pennsylvania, where she attended school. In 1916, she graduated from Penn Central High School, completing vocational training there in cooking, oral expression and sewing. She entered the hatmaking business.

Manley's racial background is not completely known. Her biological parents may have been white but she was raised by her black stepfather and her mother.

The racial background of Manley's mother Bertha Cole Brooks (née Ford) is contested. Most books say Bertha was German. Effa claimed her maternal grandfather was Native American, but her maternal grandfather was German. Bertha is listed as black on many censuses and documents, however, this could have been due to census takers and biases. No African ancestry has been proven conclusively.

Most assumed Manley's stepfather was her biological father and therefore classify her as black. However, according to the book The Most Famous Woman in Baseball by Bob Luke, Manley was born through an extramarital union between her seamstress mother and Bertha's white employer, Philadelphia stockbroker John Marcus Bishop. Daryl Russell Grigsby wrote, "...some insist she was a white woman exposed to black culture, who identified as black. Regardless of her ethnic origins, Effa Manley thought of herself as a black woman and was perceived by all who knew her as just that." Author Ted Schwarz wrote, "She was a white woman who passed as a black...She could stay in any hotel she desired."

In an interview she gave, she seemed to enjoy the confusion her skin color created. She related a story of when her husband, Abe Manley took her to Tiffany's in New York for an engagement ring. She picked out a huge five-carat stone. She remarked at how every salesgirl in the store was on hand to get a glimpse of this "old Negro man buying this young white girl a five-carat ring" and how she got a kick out of it. In 1977, Manley was interviewed for an oral history project archived at the Louie B. Nunn Center for Oral History at the University of Kentucky Libraries.

== Newark Eagles ==
She married Abe Manley in 1935 after meeting him at a New York Yankees game, and he involved her extensively in the operation of his own club, the Newark Eagles in Newark, New Jersey. She displayed particular skill in the area of marketing and often scheduled promotions that advanced the Civil Rights Movement. Her most noteworthy success was the Eagles' victory in the Negro World Series in 1946. She worked to improve the condition of the players in the entire league. She advocated better scheduling, pay, and accommodations. Her players traveled in an air-conditioned Flxible Clipper bus, considered extravagant for the Negro leagues.

She took over day-to-day business operations of the team, arranged playing schedules, planned the team's travel, managed and met the payroll, bought the equipment, negotiated contracts, and handled publicity and promotions. Thanks to her rallying efforts, more than 185 VIPs—including New York City Mayor Fiorello La Guardia, who threw out the first pitch, and Charles C. Lockwood, justice of the Supreme Court of the State of New York—were on hand to watch the Eagles' inaugural game in 1935.

Among the Eagles players during her ownership were future major league stars such as Larry Doby, who in 1947 was the first player to integrate the American League, Monte Irvin, and Don Newcombe. Manley was critical of Brooklyn Dodgers executive Branch Rickey, who signed Jackie Robinson to a minor league contract in 1945. She felt Negro league teams were justified in requesting compensation for players who were signed to major league contracts (Cleveland Indians owner Bill Veeck did pay her $10,000 compensation for Doby's contract, with another $5,000 when he stayed on the Indians roster). Manley was also critical of Negro league fans who supported Rickey because they felt he was integrating the major leagues due to civil rights causes rather than her summation of Rickey seeking business opportunity for his motivation. She also was critical of Robinson when he talked of the disorganization of the Negro leagues, asking him to not forget his beginnings and the contributions the Negro leagues had made to the game.

== Activism ==
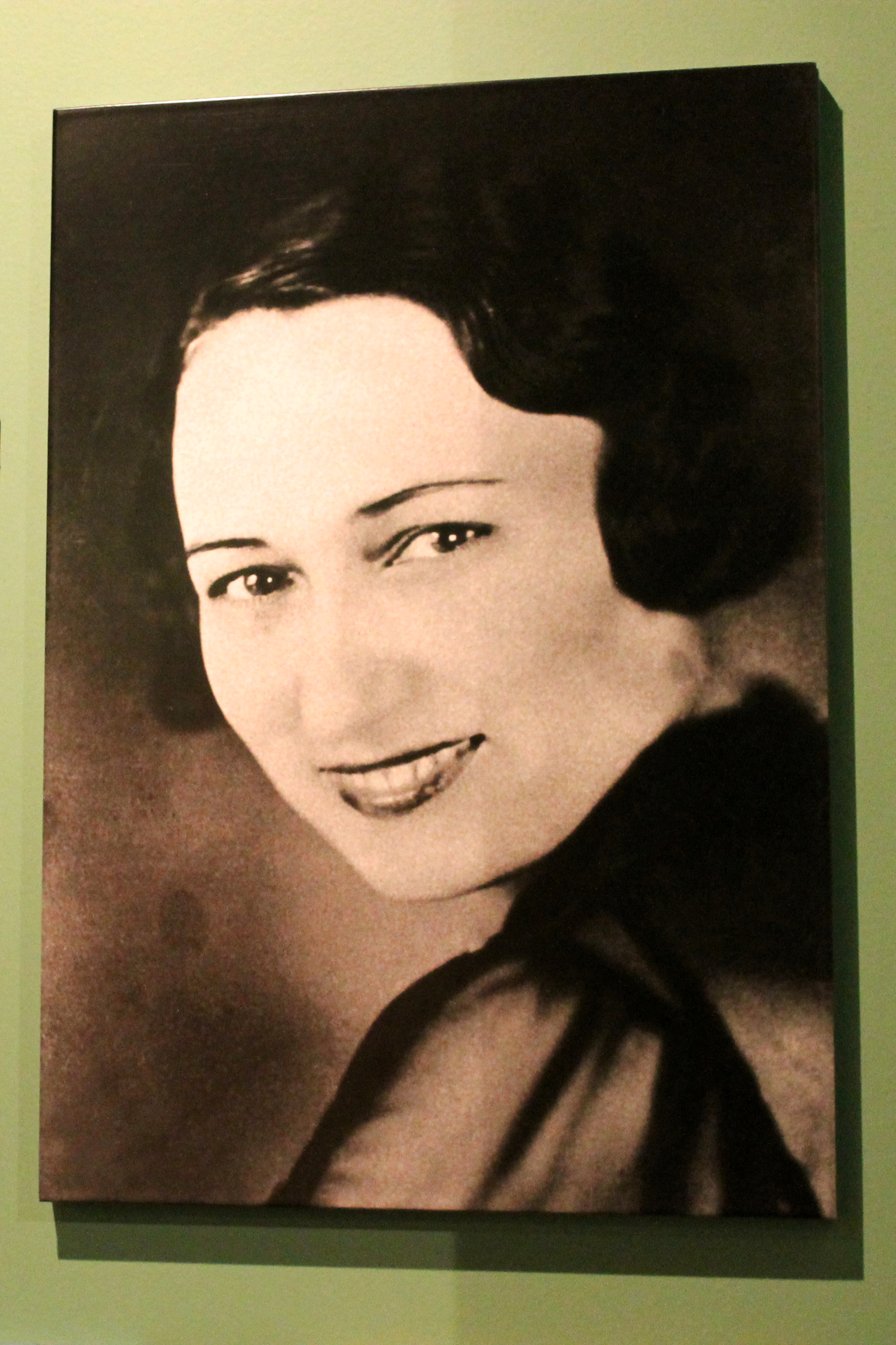
Tribute to Manley at the Baseball Hall of Fame (2014)

Her influence extended beyond baseball; she was active in the Civil Rights Movement and a social activist. Before the civil rights movement, Manley supported "Don't Buy Where You Can't Work" boycotts. As part of her work for the Citizens' League for Fair Play, Manley organized a 1934 boycott of stores that refused to hire black salesclerks. After six weeks, the owners of the store (Blumstein's Department Store) gave in, and by the end of 1935 some 300 stores on 125th Street employed black clerks. Manley was the treasurer of the Newark chapter of the National Association for the Advancement of Colored People (NAACP) and often used Eagles games to promote civic causes.

In 1939 she held an "Anti-Lynching Day" at Ruppert Stadium, selling buttons that read “Stop Lynching” to support efforts to pass federal anti-lynching legislation. During World War II she arranged for entertainers to perform for segregated Black troops stationed at Fort Dix in New Jersey when they were barred from segregated USO clubs and canteens.

At this time most blacks were barred from practicing medicine. The Booker T. Washington Community Hospital, which offered training for black doctors and nurses, opened due in a large part to money raised from the Newark Eagles. They played numerous benefit games to raise money for new medical equipment. They also raised money for Improved Benevolent and Protective Order of Elks of the World lodges, a major part of urban black social life. The Eagles worked especially hard for groups that promoted the welfare of Newark's black population. In an exhibit honoring the Negro leagues at the Baseball Hall of Fame in Cooperstown, there is a banner given to the team by the Newark Student Camp Fund in recognition of their efforts to help the community.

Another example of the relationship Effa helped forge with the community was copying a practice of another team which allowed the city's youth to attend games for free. Some children could afford the ten-cent fare for the bus ride while others jump on the back of a moving bus to take advantage of the free ballgames. Because of Effa Manley, the Newark Eagles were as important to black Newark as the Dodgers were to Brooklyn.

Manley and Leon Hardwick wrote Negro Baseball ... Before Integration. In addition to covering the Negro leagues from 1935 to 1960, parts of the book are autobiographical.

== Legacy ==
She was elected to the Baseball Hall of Fame in February 2006. She was the first woman named to the Hall of Fame.

In 2010, her life was the subject of a children's book, She Loved Baseball: The Effa Manley Story, written by Audrey Vernick and illustrated by Don Tate.

== Personal life ==
Manley was married four times and had no children. Her first husband was George Bush, a chauffeur whom she had met in Atlantic City, New Jersey, and married in 1920; they later divorced. Her second husband was Abe Manley to whom she was married from 1933 till his death in 1952. She was married to Henry Moton Clinton from December 1953 to August 1954, and to Charles Wesley Alexander from 1956 to 1957. Manley stated that she regretted both her marriages after her second one.

=== Death ===
By the spring of 1981, Manley's health had deteriorated to the point that she could no longer live in her apartment. She moved into a rest home run by former Negro league player Quincy Trouppe. Manley told Trouppe that she would go to the hospital to get checked out. She had colon cancer, which progressed into peritonitis after surgery. Manley had a heart attack and died on April 16, 1981, having never returned to the rest home. She died just four days after boxer Joe Louis, her sports idol, who had been one of the most influential black athletes of that time. Manley was buried in Culver City at the Holy Cross Cemetery.

== See also ==
- Women in baseball
