= Rob Ruck =

American historian

Rob Ruck is an American historian and author. He is a professor of history at the University of Pittsburgh. He was a member of the 2006 Baseball Hall of Fame balloting Committee on African-American Baseball to select a large number of Negro League players for inclusion into the National Baseball Hall of Fame and Museum.

== Books ==
- Tropic of Football: The Long and Perilous Journey of Samoans to the NFL (The New Press, 2018)
- Raceball: How the Major Leagues Colonized the Black and Latin Game (Beacon Press, 2011)
- Rooney: A Sporting Life (with Maggie Jones Patterson and Michael Weber) (University of Nebraska Press, 2010)
- The Tropic of Baseball: Baseball in the Dominican Republic (University of Nebraska Press, 1999)
- Sandlot Seasons: Sport in Black Pittsburgh (University of Illinois Press, 1993)
- Steve Nelson, American Radical (University of Pittsburgh Press, 1981) with Steve Nelson and James Barrett

== Television ==
- The Republic of Baseball: Dominican Giants of the American Game (with Dan Manatt) (PBS: 2006–2008)
