= Alex Pompez =

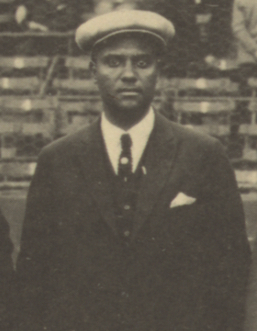
- Owner
- Born: May 3, 1890; Key West, Florida, U.S.
- Died: March 14, 1974 (aged 83); New York City, New York, U.S.

Teams
- New York Cubans (1916–1950)

Member of the National

Baseball Hall of Fame
- Induction: 2006
- Election method: Committee on African-American Baseball

Alejandro "Alex" Pompez (May 3, 1890 – March 14, 1974) was an American executive in Negro league baseball who owned the Cuban Stars (East) and New York Cubans franchises from 1916 to 1950. His family had emigrated from Cuba, where his father was a lawyer. Outside baseball and numbers (illegal gambling), he owned and operated a cigar shop in downtown Manhattan. He later served as a scout and director of international scouting for the Giants franchise in Major League Baseball. He was posthumously inducted into the Baseball Hall of Fame in 2006.

== Biography ==
Pompez was born on May 3, 1890, in Key West, Florida, the oldest of four children born to Cuban immigrants Jose and Loretta Pompez. His father was a lawyer and cigar manufacturer who had connections to Cuban author and dissident Jose Marti. Jose Pompez was on the board of directors for the Key West chapter of the Cuban Revolutionary Party; he was elected to the Florida House of Representatives as a Republican in 1892. He was a state representative until his death until 1897. Alex and his family struggled financially after his father willed his estate to the insurgency.

Alex Pompez owned the Cuban Stars of the Eastern Colored League between 1923 and 1928 and the New York Cubans of the Negro National League from 1935 to 1951. He also helped organize the first Negro League World Series in 1924. He signed numerous Latin American players for his Negro league teams, including Martín Dihigo, Minnie Miñoso and Alejandro Oms.

Several owners in the Negro National League, including Pompez, were numbers bankers. Pompez was one of New York's leading numbers bankers during the 1920s but was forced to join Dutch Schultz in 1932. His connections with Schultz's organization led to his indictment in 1936 for involvement in policy rackets when New York County District Attorney Thomas Dewey selected him as one of the targets in a crackdown on New York City racketeering. Pompez fled to Mexico after being tipped off to his arrest; he was eventually arrested by Mexican authorities, but Mexican officials refused to extradite him. Pompez decided to return to the U.S. as a state witness in the investigation. He is considered the only man who survived after turning informant against another racketeer.

In 1948, sensing that baseball's integration would change the Negro leagues, Pompez arranged for the New York Cubans to become a minor league affiliate of the New York Giants. Pompez scouted Latin America for the Giants, and they signed several players through Pompez, including Camilo Pascual, Tony Oliva and Orlando Cepeda. In 1950, Pompez submitted a favorable scouting report to the Giants on Fidel Castro. He was hired by the New York Giants to oversee their Latin American operations in 1950.

On April 17, 1960, Pompez appeared as a contestant on What's My Line? with Jonathan Winters.

Pompez served on the Baseball Hall of Fame's special Committee on Negro League Baseball in the early 1970s. He died in 1974 at age 83 in New York City. Pompez is buried at Woodlawn Cemetery in the Bronx, New York City. He was elected to the Hall of Fame in 2006.

== See also ==
- List of members of the Baseball Hall of Fame
