= Abe Manley =

- Owner
- Born: December 22, 1885; Hertford, North Carolina, U.S.
- Died: December 9, 1952 (aged 66); Germantown, Pennsylvania, U.S.

Abraham Lincoln Manley (December 22, 1885 – December 9, 1952) was an American Negro league baseball executive. He co-owned the Newark Eagles baseball franchise in the Negro leagues with his wife, Effa Manley, from 1935 to 1946.

== Biography ==
Manley was born in Hertford, North Carolina on December 22, 1885.

He met his wife, Effa, at a New York Yankees game in 1935, and involved her in the operation of his club.

Manley bought the Brooklyn Eagles and Newark Dodgers and merged them into the Newark Eagles in 1936. An active owner, Manley also served as vice president and treasurer of the Negro National League at one point and also managed the Eagles in 1936 and 1938.

He died in Germantown, Pennsylvania on December 9, 1952, roughly two weeks before what would have been his 67th birthday. He was buried at St. Madeleine Sophie Catholic Church there in the city.

== Legacy ==
Manley was among the 94 Negro league figures on the Baseball Hall of Fame ballot in 2006, but was not selected, although his wife Effa became the first woman to be inducted into the Baseball Hall of Fame.
