= Mike Mahoney (first baseman) =

American baseball player (1873–1940)

- First baseman
- Born: December 15, 1873; Boston, Massachusetts, U.S.
- Died: January 3, 1940 (aged 66); Boston, Massachusetts, U.S.
- Batted: Right Threw: Unknown

MLB debut
- May 18, 1897, for the Boston Beaneaters

Last MLB appearance
- April 17, 1898, for the St. Louis Browns

MLB statistics
- Games played: 4
- At bats: 9
- Hits: 1
- Stats at Baseball Reference

Teams
- Boston Beaneaters (1897); St. Louis Browns (1898)

George W. "Big Mike" Mahoney (December 5, 1873 – January 3, 1940) was an American first baseman in Major League Baseball. He played for the Boston Beaneaters and St. Louis Browns.
