= Robert Griffin (baseball) =

American baseball player

- Pitcher
- Threw: Left

Negro league baseball debut
- 1931, for the Chicago American Giants

Last appearance
- 1931, for the Chicago American Giants
- Stats at Baseball Reference

Teams
- Chicago American Giants (1931)

Robert Griffin was an American Negro league baseball pitcher in the 1930s.

Griffin played for the Chicago American Giants in 1931. In three recorded appearances on the mound, he posted an 8.25 ERA over 12 innings.
