= Bick Campbell =

American baseball umpire (1898–1961)

- Born: William Michael Campbell; May 1, 1898; Memphis, Tennessee, U.S.
- Died: September 27, 1961 (aged 63); Detroit, Michigan, U.S.
- Occupation: Umpire
- Years active: 1926–1931 (AL), 1939–1940 (NL)
- Employer(s): American League, National League

William Michael "Bick" Campbell (May 1, 1898 – September 27, 1961) was an American professional baseball umpire who worked in the American League from 1928 to 1931 and in the National League in 1939 and 1940. Campbell umpired 936 major league games in his seven-year career.

Campbell died of pneumonia on September 27, 1961, in Detroit, Michigan. His son, Mike Campbell, was a college football coach.

== See also ==
- List of Major League Baseball umpires (disambiguation)
