= John R. Keennan =

John R. Keenan
- Baseball Scout
- Born: May 10, 1940; Great Bend, Kansas
- Died: March 5, 2015 (aged 74); Riley, Kansas

Teams
- Los Angeles Dodgers (1962–1998)

Career highlights and awards
- Halls of Fame Inductions; Kansas Baseball Hall of Fame (1988) Greater Midwest Professional Baseball Scouts Association Hall of Fame (1998)

John Robert Keennan (May 10, 1940 – March 5, 2015) was an American baseball scout who worked from 1962 through 1998 for the Los Angeles Dodgers organization.

Born in Great Bend, Kansas, Keenan was a longtime Dodgers scout. He was originally hired as a part-time scout in 1962 by scouting director Al Campanis, became a full-time scout the next year, then by 1986 was the Dodgers midwest scouting supervisor and national crosschecker, before retiring in 1998.

Keenan was instrumental in the signing of future Hall of Fame pitcher Don Sutton and infielders Davey Lopes, Bill Russell and Mickey Hatcher, all of them members of World Series champion Dodgers teams.

In addition, Keenan signed pitcher Rick Sutcliffe, a National League Rookie of the Year winner and later a National League Cy Young Award winner with the Chicago Cubs, as well as outfielder Mitch Webster, among many others. Webster, who as a scout in 2008, represented the Dodgers when Keenan was inducted into the Greater Midwest Professional Baseball Scouts Association Hall of Fame. Previously, Keenan gained induction in the Kansas Baseball Hall of Fame in 1988.

Besides, Keenan was a member of Prince of Peace Parish at St. Patrick Catholic Church, where he was an usher for many years, Knights of Columbus Council #862 life member, B. P. O. Elks Lodge #1127, Kansas Baseball Hall of Fame, Greater Midwest Scout Association, Professional Baseball Scouts Association, and Past President of the Cougar Booster Club.

Keenan died in 2015 in Riley, Kansas, at the age of 74.
