= Dan McClellan (baseball) =

- Pitcher / Manager
- Born: July 1, 1878; Norfolk, Virginia, U.S.
- Died: March 10, 1962 (aged 83); Philadelphia, Pennsylvania, U.S.
- Batted: Left Threw: Left

debut
- 1903, for the Cuban X-Giants

Last appearance
- 1913, for the Paterson Smart Set

Teams
- Cuban X-Giants (1903–1906); Philadelphia Giants (1905–1910); Habana (1906–1907); New York Lincoln Giants (1911); Paterson Smart Set (1912–1913)

Daniel J. McClellan (July 1, 1878 – March 10, 1962) was an American professional baseball pitcher and manager who starred for top-tier independent black teams before the Negro National League was founded. His career began about 1903, and he continued as a playing manager and organizer of lesser teams well into the 1920s.

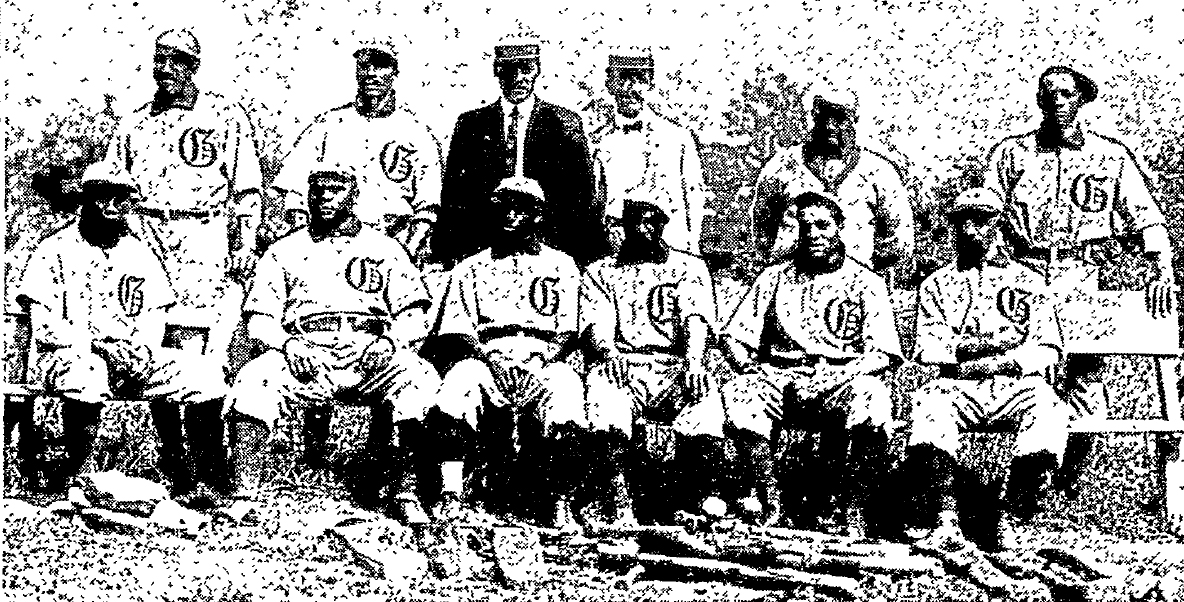
1904 Cuban X-Giants

With the Cuban X-Giants in 1903, he pitched the earliest known perfect game in black baseball against a semi-pro team. He switched to the Philadelphia Giants during the 1904 season and pitched for them through 1906. The X-Giants were arguably the best black team in 1903, and the Philadelphia Giants were also arguably the best black team in those three years while McClellan and Rube Foster were regular pitchers. McClellan was described as a "smart pitcher ... to offset his lack of a substantial fastball" by blackball historian Jame Riley.

Sportswriters Harry Daniels and Jimmy Smith both named McClellan to their 1909 "All American Team."

McClellan was named as "Dream Team" coach in the 1952 Pittsburgh Courier poll of outstanding black baseball players.

== Sources ==
- Riley, James A. (1994). "McClellan, Dan (Danny)". The Biographical Encyclopedia of the Negro Baseball Leagues. Carroll & Graf. pp. 528. ISBN 0-7867-0959-6.
