= Blanch Moody =

American baseball player

- Pitcher
- Born: March 17, 1912; Boyce, Louisiana, U.S.
- Died: October 27, 1940 (aged 28); Eloy, Arizona, U.S.

Negro league baseball debut
- 1940, for the Birmingham Black Barons

Last appearance
- 1940, for the Birmingham Black Barons
- Stats at Baseball Reference

Teams
- Birmingham Black Barons (1940)

Blanchett Lovan Moody (March 17, 1912 – October 27, 1940) was an American Negro league pitcher who played in 1940.

A native of Boyce, Louisiana, Moody played for the Birmingham Black Barons in 1940. In nine recorded appearances on the mound, he posted a 5.75 ERA over 36 innings. He was run over by a train while working as a cotton laborer in Eloy, Arizona later that year.
