= Mack Heller =

American baseball player

- First baseman
- Born: 1910
- Died: October 18, 1940 (aged 29–30); Caddo Parish, Louisiana, U.S.

Negro league baseball debut
- 1932, for the Monroe Monarchs

Last appearance
- 1932, for the Monroe Monarchs

Teams
- Monroe Monarchs (1932)

Mack Heller (1910 – October 18, 1940) was an American Negro league first baseman in the 1930s.

Heller played for the Monroe Monarchs in 1932. He died in Caddo Parish, Louisiana in 1940 at age 29 or 30.
