= Alejandro Oms =

Cuban baseball player (1896–1946)

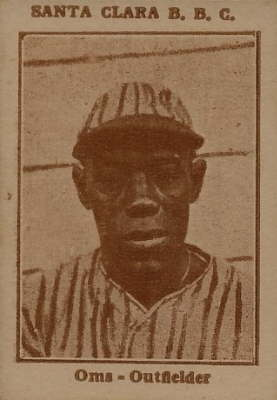
- Outfielder
- Born: March 13, 1896; Santa Clara, Cuba
- Died: November 5, 1946 (aged 50); La Habana, Cuba
- Batted: Left Threw: Left

Negro leagues debut
- 1917, for the New York Cuban Stars

Last Negro leagues appearance
- 1935, for the New York Cubans

Negro leagues (Note: On December 16, 2020, Major League Baseball declared the Negro leagues, from the span of 1920–1948, to be a "Major League". Oms' statistics reflect his time in the Negro leagues from 1923 to 1928 and his final season in 1935.) statistics
- Batting average: .329
- Home runs: 31
- Runs batted in: 216
- Stats at Baseball Reference

Teams
- New York Cuban Stars / Cuban Stars (East) (1917, 1921–1928, 1930–1932); Cuban House of David (1931); Cuban Stars (West) (1933); New York Cubans (1935)

Member of the Cuban

Baseball Hall of Fame
- Induction: 1944

Alejandro Oms Cosme (March 13, 1896 – November 5, 1946) was a Cuban professional baseball outfielder in the Negro leagues and Cuban League, most notably with the Cuban Stars (East). Born in Santa Clara, Las Villas, he died at age 50 in Havana.

Oms played winter ball in the Cuban League from 1922 to 1946. He led the league in batting average three times, in 1924/25 (.393), 1928/29 (.432), and 1929/30 (.380), and won the Cuban League's Most Valuable Player Award in 1928/29. He ranks second all-time for career batting average in the Cuban League (behind Cristóbal Torriente) with an average of .345. He was elected to the Cuban Baseball Hall of Fame in 1944.
