= 1920 Dayton Marcos season =

1920 Dayton Marcos
- League: Negro National League
- Ballpark: Westwood Field
- City: Dayton, Ohio
- Record: 16-36
- Divisional place: 7th Place
- Owners: John Matthews
- Managers: Candy Jim Taylor

The 1920 Dayton Marcos season was the first season for the franchise in the Negro National League, also in its first season.

== Founding and offseason ==
The Marcos predated the formation of the Negro National League in 1920, playing independent ball since 1909. When Rube Foster founded the league, the team was invited as a charter member. The Chicago Defender reported that owner John Matthews had scouts "covering near all the territory between Norfolk, Virginia, and Texas." 36-year-old Candy Jim Taylor, infielder on the 1918 and 1919 squads, was named manager, his first job in a career that would span more than 45 seasons and end with him as the winningest manager in Negro league history.

== Home fields ==
Though they played mostly at Westwood Field in Dayton, the Marcos called three different parks home in 1920: Westwood Field, Ducks Park in Dayton, and Stein Park in Piqua, Ohio.

== Regular season summary ==
Note: As negro league teams often moved between both league play and exhibition games throughout the season, headlines from both are included in this regular season summary.

=== April ===
- April 14: Previously postponed by rain, the Marcos began exhibition play with a 14-1 win over the semi-pro Dayton Norwoods at Westwood Field.
- April 25: The pitching tandem of George Britt and Charley Wilson held the Dayton Gyms to 4 hits in a 5-0 victory at Westwood Field.

=== May ===
- May 4: Behind another performance on the mound by Britt, the Marcos defeated the Cincinnati All-Italians 4-1 in another exhibition at Westwood Field.
- May 9: In the last exhibition game before the regular season got underway, the Marcos defeated the Cincinnati Weidemans, a semi-pro team sponsored by a local brewery. Britt starred in relief, striking out six and leaning heavily on the defense, who pulled off a key double play to hold the visitors at bay.
- May 14: The Marcos opened the regular season on the road against the Chicago American Giants at Schorling Park in Chicago. In a game "of few hits but many bases on balls and errors," Dayton edged out a win 6-5.
- May 24: In the first ever meeting of brothers Candy Jim and C. I. Taylor as opposing managers, the Indianapolis ABCs gathered a three-game sweep of the Marcos at Washington Park in Indianapolis.

=== June ===
- June 2: Opposing pitcher Bill Drake "was easy to hit" as the Marcos defeated the St. Louis Giants 6-2, snapping a five-game losing streak.
- June 3: Jimmie Oldham of the St. Louis Giants took a no-hitter into the ninth inning when it was broken up by a George Brown base hit. The rally would not be enough as the Giants won 2-1.
- June 8: The Marcos wrapped up a long road trip with a 12-inning marathon at Mack Park in Detroit against the Detroit Stars. Alonzo Longware knocked in the game winning two-run base hit for the Stars.
- June 12: Welcomed home by a parade, the Marcos beat the Chicago Giants 5-4 in their regular season home opener at Westwood Field. Giants catcher John Beckwith hit a long home run over the left field fence, the first player to do so. With the club firmly in second place, several hundred additional seats were installed at Westwood to accommodate the growing fan base.
- June 13: Behind the arm of Britt and the bat of local hero Koke Alexander, the Marcos shut out the Chicago Giants 7-0 at Westwood Field. Alexander stole the show with a flashy catch in the outfield and three hits including a home run. Newspaper accounts reported that when Alexander rounded the bases after hitting the ball over the fence, jubilant fans showered him with money.
- June 16: Marcos rookie pitcher Steel Arm Davis was chased from the mound early by the Chicago Giants' bats in his only appearance with the team. The Marcos stormed back to win 12-8, and Davis found a second career as an all-star outfielder for 15 more years.
- June 27: The Marcos fast start began to cool off and Dayton ended the month in fifth place.

=== July ===
- July 4: The Marcos made a stop at Mack Park to sweep the semi-pro Detroit Alconas in an exhibition doubleheader. The Alconas featured former big league pitcher Harry Coveleski.
- July 17: Starting first baseman Bruce Hocker and pitcher Britt both suffered from undisclosed injuries while playing against the American Giants in Gary, Indiana. The injuries were serious enough to sideline both players for "weeks."
- July 18: Devastated by the injuries to their stars and operating with a "makeshift team", the Marcos were blown out by the American Giants 8-1 in Chicago. The game was characterized by Herlen Ragland's erratic pitching and the American Giant's swift feet on the base paths. Future American Giants star Jelly Gardner played in left field, one of only two appearances he would make in a Dayton uniform.
- July 25: Behind the clutch hitting of Britt and Taylor, the Marcos hang on to win a 14 inning marathon 7-5 over the Cuban Stars (West).
- July 31: By the end of the month, the Marcos had fallen to seventh place in the league, ahead of only the Chicago Giants.

=== August ===
- August 7: The Marcos played spoilers in the Kansas City Monarchs's quest for the pennant, coming back from a five-run deficit to defeat the Monarchs 13-8.
- August 8: 11,000 fans filled Association Park in Kansas City to watch the Monarchs defeat the Marcos 4-1.
- August 15: With the Marcos firmly entrenched in the second division with a 15-32 record midway through August, the press all but declared the American Giants league champions. Newspaper accounts reported that Foster's team had "a comfortable lead and will probably endure until the end of the season."
- August 21: The Marcos lost a game by forfeit to the Detroit Stars at Mack Park. The game was delayed for rain in the bottom of the fourth inning, and when play resumed, the Stars knocked in three runs off of three base hits and an error. Declaring the field too wet to continue play, the Marcos left the field and umpires declared the Stars victors by forfeit.
- August 28: Slim Branham allowed only three hits as he pitched an 11 inning shutout over the Chicago Giants in Detroit.

=== September ===
- September 17: The Marcos suffered a 6-1 loss to the St. Louis Giants in Piqua, Ohio. League play ended on September 20, and with exhibition games advertised shortly after the series with St. Louis, it appears league play ended there with the Marcos finishing in seventh place. Following the end of the NNL season, the Marcos played exhibition games into October, taking on such teams as the Cincinnati All-Italians,
- September 19: With league play over, Matthews signed American Giants star shortstop Bobby Williams and Detroit Stars catcher Mack Eggleston. Eggleston spent 1919 with the Marcos when they were an independent team.
- September 26: Britt and the Marcos defeated the Dayton Rubbers 8-2 in game 1 of what was previously described as a city championship series.

=== October ===
- October 13: The final and deciding game of a three-game series between the Marcos and the Dayton Triangles was cancelled as the team could not field their full side on the previously scheduled Saturday. The Marcos then announced a three-game series with the Delco Federals, champions of the local semi-pro Triangle League. Matthews publicly offered to continue the series with the Triangles on any Sunday.
- October 17: The Marcos finished out their home schedule on a high note with 11-1 and 10-3 victories over the Delco Federals at Westwood Field. The Marcos finished the season on the road the following weekend at Lockland, Ohio.

=== Opening Day starters ===
The Marcos set the following lineup in their regular season opener against the Chicago American Giants on May 14.

Position	Name
CF	George Brown
2B	David Wingfield
3B	Isaac Lane
SS	Candy Jim Taylor
1B	Bruce Hocker
LF	Koke Alexander
RF	Tompkins
C	George Britt
P	Charley Wilson

=== Final standings ===
Negro National League	W	L	T	Pct.	GB
Chicago American Giants	43	17	2	.717	-
Detroit Stars	37	27	0	.578	8.0
Kansas City Monarchs	44	33	2	17.	7.5
Indianapolis ABCs	44	38	4	.537	10.0
Cuban Stars West	35	34	0	.507	12.5
St. Louis Giants	32	40	0	.444	17.0
Dayton Marcos	16	36	0	.308	23.0
Chicago Giants	5	31	0	.139	26.0

=== Roster ===
1920 Dayton Marcos
Roster
Pitchers: Slim Branham; George Britt; Arthur Coleman; Steel Arm Davis; Willie Gray; Herlen Ragland; Charley Wilson	Catchers: Sam Bennett; Mack Eggleston*; Don Jefferson; Albert McNeal; Mitchell Murray; William Webster; Infielders: John Cunningham; Samuel Dewitt; Isaac Lane; Boots McClain; Candy Jim Taylor; Bobby Williams*; David Wingfield	Outfielders: Koke Alexander; George Brown; Johnny Carr; Jelly Gardner; Bill Johnson; Thompkins (First name unknown)	Manager: Candy Jim Taylor

*Mack Eggleston and Bobby Williams joined the team after league play concluded and only participated in postseason exhibitions with the Marcos.
