= National Register of Historic Places listings in Meigs County, Ohio =

Location of Meigs County in Ohio

This is a list of the National Register of Historic Places listings in Meigs County, Ohio.

This is intended to be a complete list of the properties and districts on the National Register of Historic Places in Meigs County, Ohio, United States. The locations of National Register properties and districts for which the latitude and longitude coordinates are included below, may be seen in a Google map.

There are 9 properties and districts listed on the National Register in the county.

This National Park Service list is complete through NPS recent listings posted March 27, 2026.

== Current listings ==
| | Name on the Register | Image | Date listed | Location | City or town | Description |
|---|---|---|---|---|---|---|
| 1 | Buffington Island | Buffington Island | November 10, 1970 (#70000508) | 20 miles southeast of Pomeroy on State Route 124; 39°00′09″N 81°46′30″W | Lebanon Township | Site of a Civil War battle |
| 2 | John Downing Jr. House | John Downing Jr. House | May 6, 1993 (#93000403) | 220-232 N. 2nd Ave. 39°00′12″N 82°02′51″W | Middleport | Home of a prominent riverboat captain |
| 3 | William H. Grant House | William H. Grant House | March 30, 1978 (#78002136) | 453 Grant St. 38°59′59″N 82°03′27″W | Middleport | A very early concrete house, built in 1855 |
| 4 | Meigs County Fairgrounds, Grandstand and Racetrack | Meigs County Fairgrounds, Grandstand and Racetrack | November 29, 1982 (#82001473) | State Route 124; 39°03′44″N 82°00′53″W | Salisbury Township | A fairgrounds complex important especially for its racetrack and grandstand |
| 5 | Middleport Public Library | Middleport Public Library | January 6, 1986 (#86000033) | 178 S. 3rd St. 39°00′02″N 82°02′59″W | Middleport | A small Carnegie library |
| 6 | Mound Cemetery Mound | Mound Cemetery Mound | May 2, 1974 (#74001575) | North of Chester in Mound Cemetery; 39°06′49″N 81°55′26″W | Chester Township | An Adena burial mound |
| 7 | Old Meigs County Courthouse and Chester Academy | Old Meigs County Courthouse and Chester Academy | June 30, 1975 (#75001488) | State Route 248; 39°05′18″N 81°55′19″W | Chester | Ohio's oldest standing courthouse, and an associated early school |
| 8 | Pomeroy Historic District | Pomeroy Historic District | November 14, 1978 (#78003551) | 2nd and Main Sts.; also 2nd St. 39°01′39″N 82°02′00″W | Pomeroy | Second set of boundaries represents a boundary increase |
| 9 | Reeves Mound | | July 15, 1974 (#74001574) | North of Alfred | Orange Township | An Adena burial mound |

== See also ==
- List of National Historic Landmarks in Ohio
- Listings in neighboring counties: Athens, Gallia, Jackson (WV), Mason (WV), Vinton, Wood (WV)
- National Register of Historic Places listings in Ohio
