= John Downing (disambiguation) =

John Downing (born 1936) is a Canadian writer.

John Downing may also refer to:

- John Downing (educational psychologist) (1922–1987)
- John D. H. Downing (fl. 1960s–2010s), communications scholar
- John Downing (photographer), (1940–2020), British photographer
- John F. Downing (fl. 1910s–1920s), American architect
- Jack Downing (footballer) (John Westness Downing, 1913–1962), English footballer
- John Downing (bowls), (1904–1987), Northern Irish bowls player

== See also ==
- John Downing Jr. House, a historic house in Middleport, Ohio
- Jack Downing (disambiguation)
