= 2020 in Wales =

- Centuries: 19th; 20th; 21st
- Decades: 2000s; 2010s; 2020s
- See also: List of years in Wales; Timeline of Welsh history 2020 in The United Kingdom England Scotland Elsewhere

Events from the year 2020 in Wales.

== Incumbents ==
- First Minister – Mark Drakeford
- Secretary of State for Wales – Simon Hart
- Archbishop of Wales – John Davies, Bishop of Swansea and Brecon
- Archdruid of the National Eisteddfod of Wales – Myrddin ap Dafydd
- National Poet of Wales – Ifor ap Glyn

== Events ==
=== January ===
- 1 January
  - The mystery runner at the annual Nos Galan races in Rhondda Cynon Taf is Nigel Owens.
  - Assembly member Nick Ramsay is arrested by police after an incident at his home in Raglan, but is subsequently released without charge.
- 8 January – It is revealed that Plas Glynllifon, a mansion near Caernarfon, purchased in 2016 for conversion to a hotel, is now in the hands of receivers.
- 9 January – The rape victim in the Ross England case says in an interview with Victoria Derbyshire that the official inquiry into the conduct of former Welsh Secretary Alun Cairns was "a sham".
- 12 January – Dafydd Iwan's protest song "Yma o Hyd", originally recorded in 1981, reaches the top of the iTunes chart following a campaign by the Welsh independence movement YesCymru.
- 13 January – The Welsh Government approves the construction of a new bridge across the river Dyfi at Machynlleth, at a cost of £46 million.
- 14 January – It is revealed that a new rapid diagnosis centre at Neath Port Talbot Hospital has been effective in reducing waiting times and could result in savings of more than £150,000 per 1,000 patients.
- 24 January – The Slate Landscape of North West Wales is nominated by the UK government for consideration as a UNESCO World Heritage Site.
- 25 January – Cherry Vann is consecrated as a bishop at Brecon Cathedral and on 1 February will be enthroned as Bishop of Monmouth at Newport Cathedral.

=== February ===
- 5 February – Dyfed-Powys Police announce that they have been successful in using DNA profiling to confirm the ownership of a stolen cow worth £3,000; they are the first police authority in the UK to employ the technique in such circumstances.
- 9 February
  - At the 92nd Academy Awards, nominees include Welsh actors Jonathan Pryce (nominated for Best Actor) and Anthony Hopkins (nominated for Best Supporting Actor).
  - Storm Ciara sweeps across Wales, causing severe flooding in Llanrwst, Nantgarw and other towns and villages.
- 13 February – Nick Ramsay, AM confirms that he had been reinstated as a member of the Welsh Conservative Party Group in the Senedd and has dropped his legal challenge against the decision by group leader Paul Davies to suspend him.
- 16–17 February – Storm Dennis causes further floods and other damage in Wales, with at least one resultant death. Among the places worst hit are Pontypridd, Aberdulais and Crickhowell. Residents in Nantgarw and Pentre are affected for the second time in two weeks.
- 20 February – Natural Resources Wales admits that recent tree-felling activities in the Pentre area caused a blocked culvert that resulted in the second round of flooding to hit the local area during the month.
- 21 February – The Prince of Wales visits flood victims in the Pontypridd area.
- 28 February – COVID-19 pandemic in Wales: Authorities confirm the first case of COVID-19 in Wales, an individual who recently returned from holiday in Italy.

=== March ===
- 2 March - Price of cheap high-strength increases as the Public Health (Minimum Price for Alcohol) (Wales) Act 2018 comes into force.
- 8 March – The Welsh Government publishes plans to allow some prisoners to vote in local elections.
- 11 March – COVID-19 pandemic in Wales: Wales has its first case of "community transmission", when a patient in Caerphilly with no travel history tests positive for COVID-19.
- 12 March – COVID-19 pandemic in Wales: A patient at Wrexham Maelor Hospital tests positive for COVID-19 – the first case in North Wales.
- 13 March
  - COVID-19 pandemic in Wales: Health Minister Vaughan Gething announces that all non-urgent outpatient appointments and operations will be suspended at hospitals in Wales in a bid to delay the spread of the COVID-19 pandemic.
  - COVID-19 pandemic in Wales: Elections including those for four police and crime commissioners in Wales, scheduled for May 2020, are postponed for a year because of the pandemic.
- 16 March – COVID-19 pandemic in Wales: Authorities report the first coronavirus-related death in Wales.
- 18 March – COVID-19 pandemic in Wales: The Welsh Government announces that all schools in Wales will close from the end of the week.
- 22 March – COVID-19 pandemic in Wales: The Welsh Government advises Wales' "most vulnerable people" to stay indoors for a period of 12–16 weeks.
- 24 March – COVID-19 pandemic in Wales: It is announced that the Prince of Wales has tested positive for COVID-19.

=== April ===
- 1 April – COVID-19 pandemic in Wales: Multinational pharmaceutical company Roche denies the existence of a deal to supply Wales with COVID-19 tests after First Minister Mark Drakeford and Health Minister Vaughan Gething blame the collapse of a deal for a shortage of testing kits.
- 3 April – COVID-19 pandemic in Wales: The Welsh Government announces the funding arrangements necessary to keep Cardiff Airport solvent during the crisis.
- 12 April – COVID-19 pandemic in Wales: The new, temporary, Dragon's Heart Hospital, opens at Cardiff's Principality Stadium to admit its first patients.
- 21 April – The Welsh Government cancels the planned independent inquiry into the circumstances surrounding the dismissal of Carl Sargeant from the cabinet of former First Minister Carwyn Jones and agrees to pay legal fees incurred by the Sargeant family.

=== May ===
- 6 May – The National Assembly for Wales becomes Senedd Cymru – Welsh Parliament; its members become Members of the Senedd (MS) – Aelodau o'r Senedd (AS).
- 7 May – COVID-19 pandemic in Wales: Tracey Cooper, the chief executive of Public Health Wales, admits to the Senedd's health committee that she did not know about the Welsh Government's goal of carrying out 9000 COVID-19 tests a day.
- 8 May – COVID-19 pandemic in Wales: First Minister Mark Drakeford announces that the COVID-19 lockdown in Wales will be extended for a further three weeks.
- 12 May – The organisers of the National Eisteddfod, which was due to be held in Tregaron in the first week of August, announce an alternative event, the Eisteddfod "AmGen".
- 15 May – COVID-19 pandemic in Wales: The Welsh Government's plan for exiting the lockdown is announced by the First Minister.

=== June ===
- 3 June – The Welsh Government announces that schools in Wales will reopen on 29 June.
- 12 June – COVID-19 pandemic in Wales: First Minister Mark Drakeford announces that the R number for Wales is the lowest in the United Kingdom, at 0.7.
- 18 June – COVID-19 pandemic in Wales: 96 workers at two North Wales food production factories test positive for COVID-19.
- 19 June – COVID-19 pandemic in Wales: First Minister Mark Drakeford announces changes to lockdown restrictions with effect from 6 July.
- 20 June – Builders' merchant Travis Perkins announces the closure of three North Wales outlets.
- 26 June – After police are called to further incidents at Ogmore-by-Sea, due to over a thousand people gathering on the beach during lockdown. the First Minister warns that lockdown restrictions will not be eased if people fail to observe rules on travel and social distancing.

=== July ===
- 2 July – Airbus confirms that 1,435 jobs will be lost at Broughton in Flintshire.
- 3 July – COVID-19 pandemic in Wales: The Welsh government confirms that travel restrictions resulting from the pandemic will be relaxed from 6 July.
- 15 July – The Welsh Government agrees to debate Welsh independence for the first time since the Welsh Assembly was created in 1999. The debate is at the request of Plaid Cymru, following poll results that show a high level of approval for the devolved government's handling of the COVID-19 pandemic in Wales.
- 31 July – HM Coastguard announce the deployment of unmanned aircraft for search and rescue purposes over North Wales during the coming weekend.

=== August ===
- 3 August – CP Pharmaceuticals in Wrexham, a subsidiary of Wockhardt, is announced as having won a contract to supply COVID-19 vaccine for the COVID-19 vaccination programme in the United Kingdom.
- 10 August – Flash flooding affects Aberystwyth and thunderstorms occur throughout North Wales.
- 17 August – It is revealed that Wales's only golden eagle living in the wild has been found dead, probably from natural causes.
- 26 August – A major fire breaks out near Llangennech when a freight train loaded with diesel fuel is derailed on a journey from Milford Haven. No one is seriously injured, but diesel oil spills into the River Loughor. Local residents are evacuated.

=== September ===
- 7 September – COVID-19 pandemic in Wales: The first local lockdown in Wales is announced, as the county of Caerphilly is placed under restrictions that will last at least a month. It follows the discovery that 98 people have tested positive in a week, giving the county the highest infection rate in Wales.
- 21 September – Right-wing extremists from all over the UK are blamed by the police and First Minister for blocking the entrance to a former army camp at Penally in Pembrokeshire being used temporarily to house asylum seekers from Iran and Iraq.
- 25 September
  - Swansea, Llanelli and Cardiff go into local lockdown, joining Caerphilly, Newport, Bridgend, Merthyr, Blaenau Gwent and Rhondda Cynon Taf.
  - Ford Bridgend Engine Plant closes.
- 30 September – It is confirmed that eight patients have died in an outbreak of COVID-19 at the Royal Glamorgan Hospital, Llantrisant, and that 60 patients have been infected from a source at the hospital. All surgery at the hospital is suspended. Pontypridd MP Alex Davies-Jones and AM Mick Antoniw issue a joint statement expressing their concern.

=== October ===
- 9 October
  - In the postponed Queen's Birthday Honours 2020, Welsh recipients include Warren Gatland, former Wales rugby head coach, and opera singer Rebecca Evans (CBE), Wales rugby captain Alun Wyn Jones (OBE) and artist Glenys Cour (MBE).
  - Death of Kaylea Titford - Kaylea Titford, a 16-year-old Welsh girl with spina bifida and hydrocephalus, is found dead in squalid conditions.
- 10 October – Bangor, Gwynedd, goes into a local lockdown, joining other North Wales counties: Conwy, Denbighshire, Flintshire and Wrexham.
- 23 October – A 'firebreak' lockdown is imposed by the Welsh government for a 16-day period. Supermarkets and other large stores are prohibited from selling 'non-essential goods', because many smaller retailers are forced to close.
- 27 October – After a petition is submitted to the Senedd, requesting it remove the ban on selling non-essential goods, the government reviews the policy and issues clarification.

=== November ===
- 17 November – There are calls for an inquiry into the handling of COVID-19 cases in hospitals and care homes after it is revealed that 53 people were discharged from hospital into Welsh care homes within days of testing positive during the early stages of the pandemic.
- 20 November – The Welsh government announces that the 17-day Wales firebreak lockdown had an impact on coronavirus figures but warns that restrictions might be re-imposed before Christmas if the downturn does not last.
- 26 November – New COVID restrictions, to come into force on 4 December, are provisionally announced.

=== December ===
- 20 December – COVID restrictions are amended, and the previously announced relaxation of rules over the Christmas break is rescinded. The Welsh government announces a complete lockdown in Wales with effect from midnight, with a relaxation of only a few hours on Christmas Day.
- 29 December – Police impose fines on visitors from England who have broken COVID restrictions in order to visit Pen y Fan.
- 31 December – Welsh people honoured in the Queen's New Year Honours list include Professor Anthony Keith Campbell (CBE), surgeon Farah Batti (OBE), footballer Alan Curtis (MBE), and Carol Doggett, matron of Morriston Hospital (MBE).

== Arts and culture ==
=== National Eisteddfod of Wales ===
Gŵyl AmGen prizes:

- Cystadleuaeth y Stôl Farddoniaeth (Poetry Competition) – Terwyn Tomos
- Cystadleuaeth y Stôl Ryddiaith (Prose Competition) – Llŷr Gwyn Lewis

=== Awards ===
- Wales Book of the Year 2020:
  - English language: Niall Griffiths, Broken Ghost
  - Welsh language: Ifan Morgan Jones, Babel
- Dylan Thomas Prize: Bryan Washington

=== New books ===
==== English language ====
- Peter Finch – The Machineries of Joy
- Michael Franklin (ed.) – Writers of Wales: Hester Lynch Thrale Piozzi
- Euron Griffith – Miriam, Daniel and Me
- Richard Owain Roberts – Hello Friend We Missed You
- Eloise Williams – Wilde

==== Welsh language ====
- Hazel Walford Davies – O.M. – Cofiant Syr Owen Morgan Edwards
- Huw Jones – Dwi Isio Bod Yn...

=== Music ===
==== New albums ====
- Shirley Bassey – I Owe It All to You
- Georgia Ruth – Mai

==== New compositions ====
- Paul Mealor – Piano Concerto

=== Film ===
- Dream Horse, directed by Euros Lyn, starring Damian Lewis, Owen Teale, Joanna Page, Karl Johnson and Steffan Rhodri

=== Broadcasting ===
==== English language ====
- Hidden Wales, series 2, presented by Will Millard
- Memory Lane, presented by Jennifer Saunders, features Michael Sheen, with footage from Port Talbot and Hay-on-Wye.
- Richard Parks: Can I Be Welsh and Black? (documentary by ITV Cymru)
- Tudur's TV Flashback, series 4, presented by Tudur Owen

==== Welsh language ====
- Am Dro!
- Pandemig: 1918 / 2020, directed by Eirlys Bellin
- Waliau'n Siarad

== Sport ==
- Horse Racing
  - 27 December – the 2020 Welsh Grand National is abandoned due to waterlogging caused by Storm Bella and postponed to 9 January 2021.
- Rugby Union
  - 1 February – Wales defeat Italy 42–0 at the Millennium Stadium in Cardiff, in the opening match of the 2020 Six Nations Championship. Wales's under-20 team and women's team are both defeated by the corresponding Italian teams.

== Deaths ==
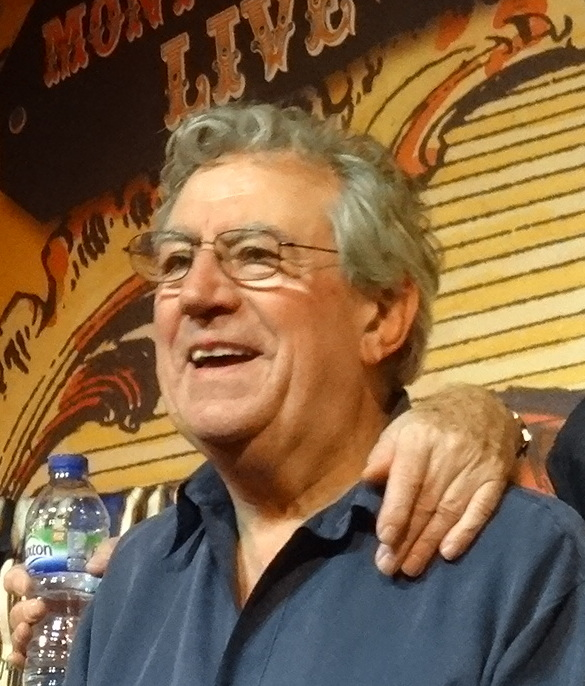
Terry Jones

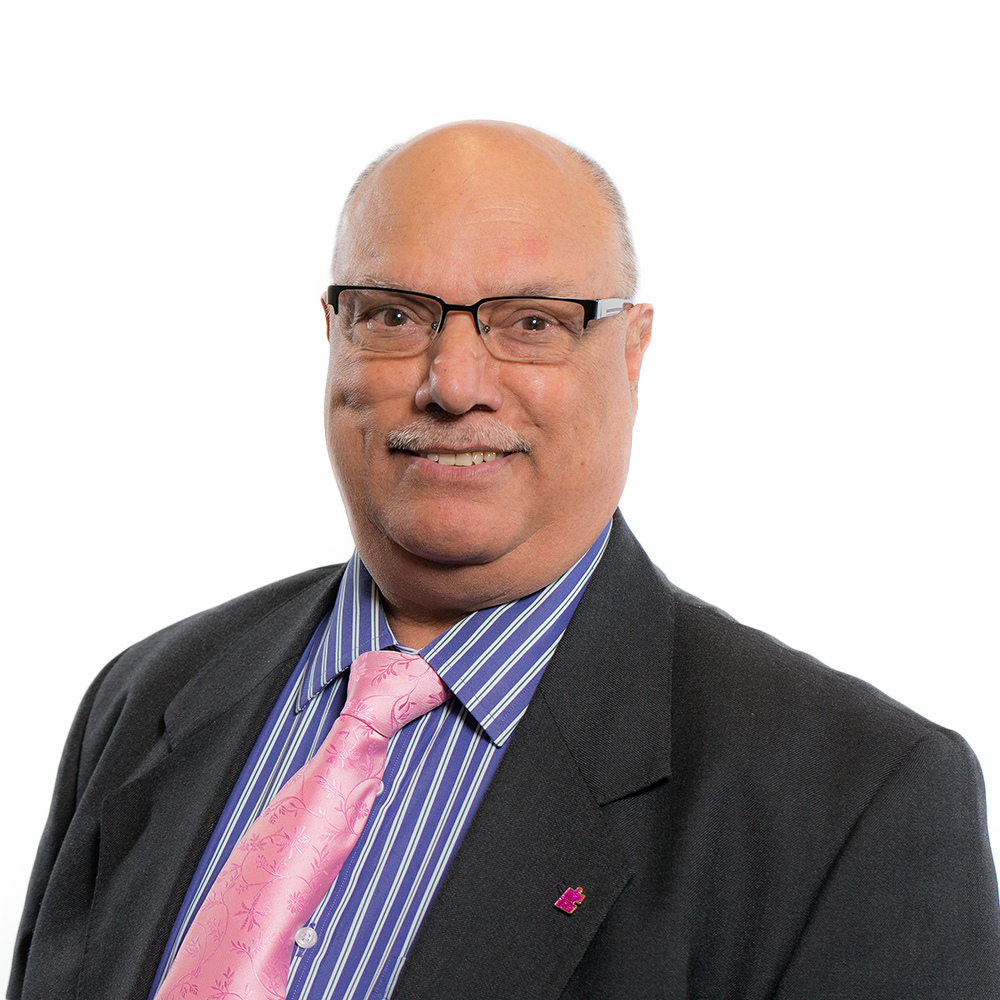
Mohammad Asghar

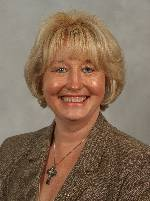
Denise Idris Jones

- 10 January – Alun Gwynne Jones, Baron Chalfont, 100
- 21 January – Terry Jones, comedian, actor, writer, director and historian, 77
- 4 February – Terry Hands, theatre director, former artistic director of Theatr Clwyd, 79
- 9 February – Sir John Cadogan, organic chemist, 89
- 15 February – Cavan Grogan, lead singer of Crazy Cavan and the Rhythm Rockers, 70
- 29 February – Ceri Morgan, darts player, 72
- 7 March – Matthew Watkins, rugby player, 41 (cancer)
- 19 March – Peter Whittingham, footballer with Cardiff City F.C., 35 (head injury)
- 23 March – Tristan Garel-Jones, politician, 79
- 27 March – Aneurin Hughes, diplomat, 83
- 3 April – C. W. Nicol, writer, singer, actor and environmentalist, 79
- 5 April – Peter Walker, Glamorgan cricketer, 84
- 8 April – John Downing, photographer, 79
- 14 April
  - John Collins, footballer, 71
  - Cyril Lawrence, English footballer, former Wrexham player, 99 (COVID-19)
- 15 April – John T. Houghton, physicist and climate scientist, 88 (COVID-19)
- 22 April – Jimmy Goodfellow, former Cardiff FC manager and physiotherapist, 76
- 25 April – Liz Edgar, showjumper, 76
- May – Steve Blackmore, rugby player, 58 (brain tumour)
- 13 May – Keith Lyons, sports scientist, 68
- 14 May – Ken Rees, television journalist, 76
- 9 June – Paul Chapman, rock guitarist, 66
- 12 June – Ricky Valance, singer, first Welshman to have a UK number one solo hit, 84
- 16 June – Mohammad Asghar, politician, 74
- 24 July – Denise Idris Jones, politician, 69
- 26 July
  - Chris Needs, radio presenter, 68
  - Keith Pontin, footballer, 64
- 28 July – Clive Ponting, former civil servant and academic at the University of Wales, Swansea, 74
- 2 August – Mark Ormrod, historian, 62 (bowel cancer)
- 22 August – Ted Grace, Swansea-born politician in Australia, 89
- 26 August – David Mercer, sports presenter, 70
- 4 September – Sir Simon Boyle, former British Steel executive and Lord Lieutenant of Gwent 2001–2016, 79
- 9 September – Tony Villars, footballer, 69
- 21 September – John Meirion Morris, sculptor, 84
- 24 September – John Walter Jones, first Chief Executive of the Welsh Language Board, 74
- 30 September – Emyr Humphreys, writer, 101
- 19 October – Spencer Davis, musician, 81
- 26 October – Tony Wyn-Jones, DJ, 77
- 29 October – J. J. Williams, rugby player, 72
- 13 November
  - Gwyn Jones, footballer, 85
  - Sir John Meurig Thomas, scientist, 87
- 19 November – Helen Morgan, hockey international, 54 (cancer)
- 20 November – Jan Morris, writer, 94
- 22 November – Ray Prosser, rugby union player and coach, 93
- 17 December – John Barnard Jenkins, nationalist activist, 87
