= List of inmates at the United States Penitentiary, Leavenworth =

This is a list of notable current and former inmates at the United States Penitentiary, Leavenworth.

== Bank robbers ==
Inmate Name	Register Number	Photo	Status	Details
Duane Earl Pope	85021-132		Served a life sentence. Was released in 2016. Now serving life sentence at Nebraska State Penitentiary.	Bank robber and former FBI Ten Most Wanted fugitive; killed three bank employees and wounded a fourth while robbing a Nebraska bank of $1600 in 1965.
Christopher Jeburk	09029-021		Serving a life sentence. Was transferred to Atlanta after trying to escape a third time by hanging onto a laundry truck, but was caught before the truck got to the front gate. Currently at USP Allenwood.	Bank robber and former FBI Ten Most Wanted fugitive; kidnapped bank teller Amy Shaw and her family, then escaped from prison twice before he could be sentenced for his crimes.
Thomas Holden	Unlisted		Deceased; Holden died in prison in 1953.	Bank robbery team known as the Holden-Keating Gang who stole millions of dollars in cash and securities from banks in the 1920s and 1930s; escaped from USP Leavenworth in 1930; apprehended and returned to USP Leavenworth in 1932.
Francis Keating	Unlisted		Deceased; Keating died in 1978 after being released.	Bank robbery team known as the Holden-Keating Gang who stole millions of dollars in cash and securities from banks in the 1920s and 1930s; escaped from USP Leavenworth in 1930; apprehended and returned to USP Leavenworth in 1932.
Troy Deon Reddick	87145-011		Released from custody in 1996; served 4 years.	Rap-artist known as Da' Unda' Dogg and former member of the Romper Room Crew, a criminal gang in Vallejo, California; Reddick and other gang members were convicted of bank robbery in 1992.

== Espionage ==
Inmate Name	Register Number	Photo	Status	Details
Fritz Duquesne	Unlisted		In 1945, Duquesne was transferred to the United States Medical Center for Federal Prisoners in Springfield, Missouri, due to his failing physical and mental health. In 1954, he was released owing to ill health, having served 14 years.	Convicted in 1941 of leading the Duquesne Spy Ring, a group of spies for the Nazis which operated in the US from 1939 to 1941 and aimed to obtain information regarding military and industrial sabotage targets; all ring members were convicted in what was the largest espionage case in US history.
Herman W. Lang	Unlisted		Lang received a sentence of 18 years in prison. He was deported to Germany in September 1950.	A member of the Duquesne Spy Ring, Lang was convicted in 1941 on espionage charges and a two-year concurrent sentence under the Registration Act. Before his arrest, Lang had provided the German Abwehr highly confidential materials essential to the national defense of the United States including the top secret Norden bombsight.

== Fraudsters and corrupt officials ==
Inmate Name	Register Number	Photo	Status	Details
Charles R. Forbes	Unlisted		Released from custody in 1927 after serving 2 years.	Appointed by President Warren G. Harding, Forbes was the first director of the Veterans' Bureau; convicted of conspiracy to defraud the U.S. government in 1923. Forbes was a cellmate of Frederick Cook.
Frederick Cook	Unlisted		Released from custody in 1930 after serving 8 years.	American explorer and physician; served as a surgeon on Robert Peary's 1891 Arctic expedition; convicted in 1922 of mail fraud.
Tom Petters	14170-041		Serving a 50-year sentence; scheduled for release in 2050.	Former Minnesota CEO; convicted in 2009 of conspiracy, wire fraud, mail fraud and money laundering for orchestrating a $3.65 billion Ponzi scheme, the second largest fraud case in US history; featured on the CNBC television show American Greed.
Tom Pendergast	Unlisted		Held at USP Leavenworth from 1939 to 1940.	Political boss in Kansas City, Missouri who engaged in bribery and voter intimidation; discovered and supported Harry Truman in the 1934 United States Senate election in Missouri; convicted of tax evasion in 1939.

== Gangsters ==
Inmate Name	Register Number	Photo	Status	Details
Dillard Morrison Sr.	69133-012		Held at USP Leavenworth from 1950 to 1955.	Harlem organized crime figure of the 1940s & 1950s; battled/befriended Bumpy Johnson for control of Harlem's criminal underworld; convicted of drug possession in 1950.
Rosario "Russell" Bufalino	04891-054		Held at USP Leavenworth from 1981 to 1989.	Boss Bufalino crime family. In November 1981, Bufalino was sentenced to 10 years in prison for conspiring to kill the witness, Jack Napoli.
James J. Bulger	02182-748		Held at USP Leavenworth from 1962 to 1963. Murdered in prison in October 2018 at USP Hazelton.	Boss of the Winter Hill Gang in Boston and former FBI informant; fled in 1994 after being indicted for violations of the Racketeer Influenced and Corrupt Organizations Act, including murder, extortion, drug trafficking and money laundering; placed on the FBI Ten Most Wanted List in 1999 and apprehended in 2011.
George Kelly	Unlisted		Held at USP Leavenworth from 1933 to 1934 and again from 1951 to his death in 1954.	Prohibition era gangster known as "Machine Gun Kelly;" engaged in bootlegging and armed robbery; best known for the 1933 kidnapping of Texas oilman Charles F. Urschel; Kelly was apprehended less than two months later and sentenced to life in prison.
George Moran	Unlisted		Died at USP Leavenworth in 1957 while serving a 10-year sentence.	Prohibition era gangster; battled Al Capone for the control of Chicago's criminal underworld; convicted of bank robbery in 1957; also known as "Bugs."
Luis Hernando Gómez	04173-748		Serving a 25-year sentence; scheduled for release 2032. Currently at FCI Mendota.	Colombian Drug Lord; known as "Rasguño", member of the Norte Del Valle Cartel. On October 18, 2008, Gomez pleaded guilty to racketeering charges in a Washington court. He also admitted sending over 500,000 kilograms of cocaine to America through Mexico between 1990 and 2004 as well as conspiracy to make and distribute more than 10,000 kilograms of cocaine destined for the US.
Benny Binion	Unlisted		Sentenced in 1953 to serve five years for tax evasion.	A gangster who operated bootlegging and gambling rackets in Texas, even suspected of murdering several competitors. Known to style himself as a gunslinging cowboy. Binion fled to Las Vegas in 1946, and eventually founded the Binion's Horseshoe casino in 1951.
John Franzese Sr.	70022-158		Released from custody in 1978 after serving 8 years	American Mafia figure former Underboss of the Colombo Crime Family in New York City; convicted in 1970 of bank robbery; sentenced to 8 years in prison in 2011 for racketeering and extortion.
Anthony Corallo	08341-016		Deceased; died in 2000 at the US Medical Center for Federal Prisoners in Springfield, Missouri while serving a 100-year sentence.	Boss of the Lucchese Crime Family in New York City; Corallo and other crime bosses were defendants in the 1986 Mafia Commission Trial, which resulted in Corallo being convicted of racketeering.
Felix Mitchell	76769-012		Deceased; fatally stabbed at USP Leavenworth in 1986 while serving a life sentence.	Leader of the "69 Mob" gang, which sold millions of dollars' worth of heroin throughout California in the early 1980s and protected its turf through violence; convicted in 1985 of murder, murder conspiracy and drug trafficking conspiracy; Mitchell is credited with creating the country's first large-scale, gang-controlled drug operation.
Antonio Fernandez	38475-054		Released from custody in 2009 after serving ten years.	Leader of the Latin Kings gang in New York and New Jersey from 1996 to 1999; pleaded guilty to conspiracy to distribute heroin and cocaine; also known as "King Tone."
Thomas Silverstein	14634-116		Went to prison in 1977. Died due to complications from heart surgery in May 2019.	Prison authorities describe him as a brutal killer and a former leader of the Aryan Brotherhood prison gang. He had been incarcerated continuously from 1977 till 2019 and has been convicted of four separate murders while imprisoned, one of which was overturned

== Political prisoners ==
Inmate Name	Register Number	Photo	Status	Details
Samuel R. Caldwell	Unlisted		Released from custody in 1940 after serving 3 years.	First person in the United States to be arrested and convicted for selling marijuana under the Marijuana Tax Act of 1937.
Frank S. Emi	Unlisted		Released in 1945 after serving 18 months of a 4-year sentence.	Founding member of the Fair Play Committee at Heart Mountain concentration camp for Japanese Americans evicted from the West Coast during World War II; Emi and six other FPC leaders were convicted of conspiracy to violate the Selective Service Act after protesting the incarceration and encouraging internees to resist the draft unless they and their families were released from camp. The charges were eventually overturned by a Federal Appeals court.
Ricardo Flores Magón	Unlisted		Deceased; died in 1922 of natural causes at USP Leavenworth while serving a 20-year sentence.	Mexican anarchist and founder of the Mexican Liberal Party; arrested during the Palmer Raids under President Woodrow Wilson and Attorney General A. Mitchell Palmer, an operation which aimed to detain and deport people who were seen as radical leftists; Magón was convicted of "obstructing the war-effort" under the Espionage Act of 1917 for protesting the United States' involvement in World War I.
Gus Hall	Unlisted		Held at USP Leavenworth from 1951 to 1957.	Leader of the Communist Party USA from 1959 until his death in 2000; Hall and 11 party leaders were tried under the Smith Act, which was used to charge and incarcerate perceived enemies of the US government; Hall was convicted in 1948 and sentenced to five years in prison. Hall was subsequently sentenced to an extra three years for jumping bail.
Gordon Wendell Kahl	unlisted		Served eight months in 1977 for non-payment of his 1973 and 1974 income taxes.	One time member of the anti-tax Posse Comitatus, father of Yorie von Kahl. Murdered federal law enforcement officers in two shootouts in 1983.
Yorie von Kahl	04565-059		Serving a life sentence for his supporting role in tax protester related shootings. He was transferred to the maximum security prison at USP Terre Haute, Indiana when USP Leavenworth was downgraded to medium security. Currently at FCI Pekin.	Son of Gordon Wendell Kahl, who shot and killed two U.S. Marshals near Medina, North Dakota in February 1983.
Leonard Peltier	89637-132		Transferred to USP Lewisburg in 2005. Sentence commuted to home confinement in 2025.	Leader of the American Indian Movement, a Native American activist group; convicted in 1977 of murdering FBI Agents Ronald A. Williams and Jack R. Coler during a shootout at Pine Ridge Indian Reservation in 1975.

== Sports figures ==
Inmate Name	Register Number	Photo	Status	Details
Roy Evans			Sentenced to two years, served approximately 19 months, released on June 26, 1922.	Baseball player, pleaded guilty to violating the Mann Act.
Joe Fleet			Sentenced to ten years in prison, paroled in 1930.	Negro league baseball player; charged with housebreaking and larceny.
Randy Lanier	04961-069		Sentenced to life in prison in 1988, released October 15, 2014.	Racecar driver, 1984 IMSA Camel GT champion and 1986 Indy 500 Rookie of the Year; indicted in 1988 for conspiring to distribute more than 1,000 pounds of marijuana and of being principal administrators of a Continuing Criminal Enterprise between 1982 and 1986.
Byron "Bam" Morris	13184-045		Released from custody in 2002 after serving 30 months.	Former NFL running back; pleaded guilty in 2000 to drug trafficking and money laundering for operating a marijuana distribution ring in Kansas City, Missouri between 1998 and 2000.
John Paul Sr.	06818-018		Released from custody in 1999 after serving 13 years.	Racecar driver, 1979 Trans-Am champion; indicted for drug trafficking in 1983; subsequently pleaded guilty to attempted murder for the shooting of Steven Carson, who provided testimony to a federal grand jury which led to his indictment.
Saousoalii "Junior" Siavii	34304-045		Died in custody on January 13, 2022 while awaiting trial.	American football player, arrested and charged with drug trafficking in 2019.
Scott Tucker	06133-045		Sentenced to 1 year in prison in 1991, released 1992	Racecar driver and payday lender; indicted in 1991 for three felony charges, including mail fraud and making false statements to a bank.
Roy Tyler			Sentenced to life in prison in 1917, paroled in 1924. Reincarcerated around 1932 for violating parole and released in 1936.	Negro league baseball player; convicted of mutiny for participating in the Houston riot of 1917.
Michael Vick	33765-183		Released from custody in 2009 after serving 23 months.	National Football League quarterback; pleaded guilty to operating an interstate dog fighting ring known as "Bad Newz Kennels."
David Wingfield			Sentenced to ten years in prison, released in 1919.	Negro league baseball player; convicted for the shooting death of a fellow soldier in the 10th Cavalry Regiment.

== Violent criminals ==
Inmate Name	Register Number	Photo	Status	Details
James Earl Ray	Unlisted		Released from custody in 1958 after serving 3 years.	Held at USP Leavenworth from 1955 to 1958 after being convicted of forgery; assassinated Martin Luther King Jr. in 1968.
Carl Panzram	Unlisted		Executed by hanging at USP Leavenworth in 1930.	Serial killer, rapist, arsonist and burglar; confessed to 22 murders; executed for the murder of Institution Laundry Foreman Robert G. Warnke, which Panzram committed while serving a 25-year sentence at USP Leavenworth.
Phillip Garrido	36377-136		Released from federal custody in 1988 after serving 11 years; currently serving a life sentence in California State Prison, Corcoran.	Pleaded guilty of kidnapping Jaycee Lee Dugard in 1991; his wife, Nancy, was also sentenced to 36 years.
Robert Stroud	Unlisted		Held at USP Leavenworth from 1912 to 1942; transferred to the federal prison on Alcatraz Island in 1942.	Convicted of manslaughter in 1909 and murdering a correction officer in 1916; raised and studied birds in his cell at USP Leavenworth and became a leading ornithologist; wrote two books and made significant contributions to the field of ornithology.
Joseph Jesse Vaccaro	02723-010		Died in prison on January 22, 2008.	Pleaded guilty along with Robert Lee Willie in 1980 to kidnapping a young couple in Louisiana, repeatedly raping the female victim. The two were also convicted of an unrelated state murder charge. Vaccaro was sentenced to life in prison and Willie was executed in 1984.
Isaac Jackson Hurt	Unlisted		Paroled in 1977. Died in 1984.	Raped and murdered 6-year-old Yumiko Nagayama in Kadena, Okinawa, in a crime which became known as the Yumiko-chan incident. Hurt was initially sentenced to death, but this was commuted to 45 years in prison without parole. He was paroled in 1977, after another commutation made him eligible for parole.

== See also ==
- Federal Bureau of Prisons
- Incarceration in the United States
- List of lists of people from Kansas
- List of people from Leavenworth County, Kansas
- List of U.S. federal prisons
