= Isaac Lane (baseball) =

American baseball player

- Third baseman
- Born: November 27, 1888; Screven, Georgia, U.S.
- Died: September 18, 1979 (aged 90); Xenia, Ohio, U.S.
- Batted: Left Threw: Right

Negro league baseball debut
- 1918, for the Dayton Marcos

Last appearance
- 1922, for the Detroit Stars

Teams
- Dayton Marcos (1918, 1920); Columbus Buckeyes (1921); Detroit Stars (1922)

Isaac Sappe Lane (November 27, 1888 – September 18, 1979) was an American Negro league third baseman from 1918 to 1922.

A native of Screven, Georgia, Lane attended Wilberforce University. He made his major league debut with the Dayton Marcos in 1918, and went on to play for the Columbus Buckeyes in 1921, and Detroit Stars in 1922. Lane died in Xenia, Ohio in 1979 at age 90.
