= Herlen Ragland =

American baseball player

- Pitcher
- Born: February 2, 1896; Buffalo Valley, Tennessee, U.S.
- Died: August 12, 1960 (aged 64); Kansas City, Missouri, U.S.
- Threw: Left

Negro league baseball debut
- 1920, for the Dayton Marcos

Last appearance
- 1921, for the Columbus Buckeyes

Teams
- Dayton Marcos (1920); Indianapolis ABCs (1920); Columbus Buckeyes (1921)

Herlen Ragland (February 2, 1896 – August 12, 1960) was an American Negro league pitcher in the 1920s.

A native of Buffalo Valley, Tennessee, Ragland made his Negro leagues debut in 1920 with the Dayton Marcos and Indianapolis ABCs. The following season, he played for the Columbus Buckeyes during the team's only season in the Negro National League. Ragland died in Kansas City, Missouri in 1960 at age 64. He is also listed in some sources as "Clifton Ragland."
