= Mack Eggleston =

American baseball player (1896–1980)

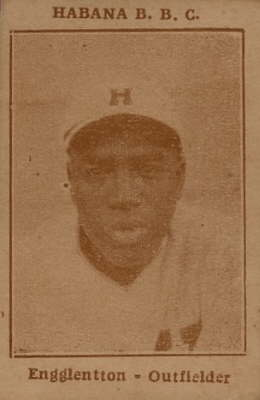
- Catcher / Outfielder / Manager
- Born: September 16, 1896; Roanoke, Virginia, U.S.
- Died: September 1980 (aged 83–84); Baltimore, Maryland, U.S.
- Batted: Right Threw: Right

debut
- 1919, for the Dayton Marcos

Last appearance
- 1934, for the Bacharach Giants
- Stats at Baseball Reference
- Managerial record at Baseball Reference

Teams
- As player: Dayton Marcos (1919); Detroit Stars (1920); Columbus Buckeyes (1921); Indianapolis ABCs (1922); Washington/Wilmington Potomacs (1923–1925); Harrisburg Giants (1925–1926); Lincoln Giants (1926); Baltimore Black Sox (1926–1928, 1930, 1933); Bacharach Giants (1929, 1934); New York Black Yankees (1931); Homestead Grays (1932); Washington Pilots (1932); Nashville Elite Giants (1934); As manager: Wilmington Potomacs (1925)

Macajah Marchand "Mack" Eggleston Jr. (September 16, 1896 – September, 1980) was an American professional baseball catcher and outfielder in the Negro leagues. He played from 1919 to 1934 with over a dozen teams. He also served as manager of the Wilmington Potomacs in 1925.
