= Samuel Dewitt =

American baseball player

- Infielder
- Born: December 17, 1893; Bristol, Tennessee, U.S.
- Batted: Right Threw: Right

Negro league baseball debut
- 1919, for the Dayton Marcos

Last appearance
- 1926, for the Dayton Marcos
- Stats at Baseball Reference

Teams
- Dayton Marcos (1919–1920); Indianapolis ABCs (1920); Columbus Buckeyes (1921); Toledo Tigers (1923); Dayton Marcos (1926)

Samuel Dewitt (December 17, 1893 – death unknown) was an American Negro league infielder between 1919 and 1926.

A native of Bristol, Tennessee, Dewitt made his Negro leagues debut in 1919 with the Dayton Marcos. He went on to play for the Indianapolis ABCs, Columbus Buckeyes, Toledo Tigers, and finished his career back in Dayton in 1926.
