= Charley Wilson =

American baseball player

- Pitcher
- Born: June 26, 1895; Roanoke, Virginia, U.S.
- Died: December 15, 1965 (aged 70); Salem, Virginia, U.S.

Negro league baseball debut
- 1920, for the Dayton Marcos

Last appearance
- 1926, for the Dayton Marcos

Teams
- Dayton Marcos (1920); Columbus Buckeyes (1921); Detroit Stars (1921–1922); Dayton Marcos (1926)

Charles Wilson Jr. (June 26, 1895 – December 15, 1965) was an American Negro league pitcher in the 1920s.

A native of Roanoke, Virginia, Wilson made his Negro leagues debut in 1920 with the Dayton Marcos. He went on to play for the Columbus Buckeyes and Detroit Stars, and finished his career with a short return stint in Dayton in 1926. Wilson died in Salem, Virginia in 1965 at age 70.
