= Columbus Buckeyes =

Columbus Buckeyes may refer to:

- Columbus Buckeyes (minor league) A minor league team in the International Association in 1877
- Columbus Buckeyes (AA), a baseball team in the American Association from 1883 to 1884
- Columbus Buckeyes (Negro leagues), a Negro National League team in 1921

== See also ==
- Ohio State Buckeyes, Columbus, Ohio
