= Marion Cunningham =

Marion Cunningham may refer to:

- Marion Cunningham (author) (1922–2012), American cookbook author
- Marion Cunningham (baseball) (1895–1982), American Negro leagues baseball player
- Marion Cunningham (Happy Days), a fictional character on the 1970s television series Happy Days, played by Marion Ross
- Marion Osborn Cunningham (1908–1948), American artist
