= Jack Downing =

Jack Downing may refer to:

- Jack Downing (footballer) (fl. 1930s), Darlington F.C. footballer
- Jack Downing (sculptor) (1920–1993), British sculptor
- Jack G. Downing (1940–2021), Deputy Director for Operations for the CIA from 1997 until July 1999
- Major Jack Downing, American writer Seba Smith's popular series character

== See also ==
- John Downing (disambiguation)
