= Boots McClain =

American baseball player

- Infielder
- Born: March 2, 1927; Louisville, Kentucky, U.S.
- Died: July 31, 2006 (aged 79); Columbus, Ohio, U.S.
- Batted: Right Threw: Right

Negro league baseball debut
- 1920, for the Dayton Marcos

Last appearance
- 1926, for the Dayton Marcos

Teams
- Dayton Marcos (1920); Indianapolis ABCs (1920); Columbus Buckeyes (1921); Cleveland Tate Stars (1921–1922); Toledo Tigers (1923); Detroit Stars (1923); Cleveland Browns (1924); Dayton Marcos (1926)

Edward McClain (March 7, 1899 – August 24, 1985), nicknamed "Boots", was an American Negro league infielder in the 1920s.

A native of Louisville, Kentucky, McClain made his Negro leagues debut in 1920 with the Dayton Marcos and Indianapolis ABCs. He went on to play for several teams, finishing his career back in Dayton in 1926. McClain died in Columbus, Ohio in 1985 at age 86.
