= Shock humour =

Style of comedy intended to shock the audience

Shock humour is a style of comedy intended to shock the audience. This can be achieved through excessively foul toilet humour, pop cultural references, overt violent and sexual themes, profanity, mocking of serious themes (otherwise known as black comedy), or through tactlessness in the aftermath of a crisis.

In radio, shock jocks use this type of humor. Such risque broadcasting can cause controversy, as demonstrated by Jim Quinn and Don Jefferson's "Stupid Human Tricks" segment of their late-1980s WBZZ-FM show.

Practitioners of shock humour include Andrew Dice Clay, Andy Kaufman, Tom Green, Bill Hicks, George Carlin, Bill Maher, Bill Burr, Louis C.K., and Eric André. The movie Fritz the Cat, the video game series Saints Row, and television shows such as The Ren & Stimpy Show, Robot Chicken, South Park, Family Guy, Superjail!, Jackass, Space Ghost: Coast to Coast, Drawn Together, Panty & Stocking with Garterbelt, Rick and Morty, Beavis and Butt-Head, It's Always Sunny in Philadelphia, and The Filthy Frank Show have also been described as shock humour.

== See also ==
- Low culture
- Shock value
- Off-color humor
- Shock site
