= Koke Alexander =

American baseball player

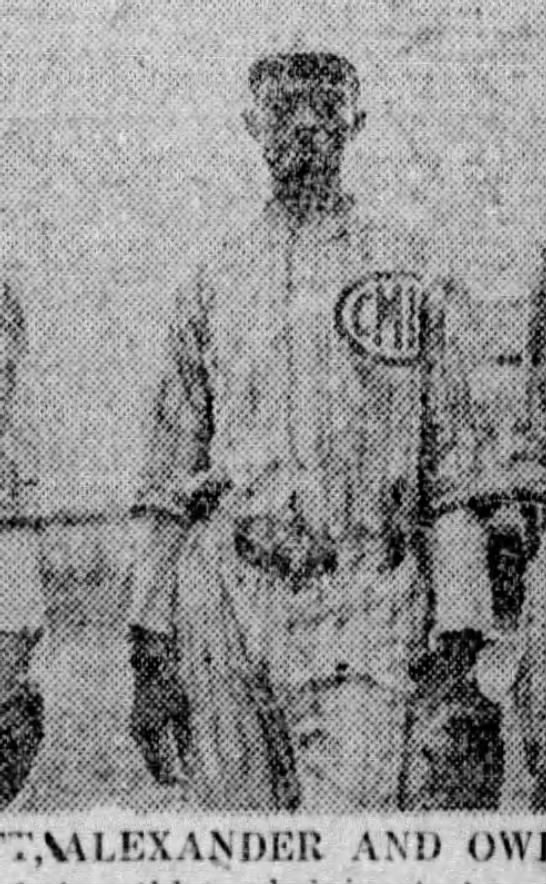
- Alexander in 1922
- Outfielder
- Born: February 1, 1888; Winston-Salem, North Carolina, US
- Threw: Right

debut
- 1918, for the Dayton Marcos

Last appearance
- 1921, for the Chicago Giants
- Stats at Baseball Reference

Teams
- Dayton Marcos (1918–1920); Columbus Buckeyes (1921); Chicago Giants (1921)

Alfred "Koke" Alexander (February 1, 1888 - death date unknown) was an American Negro leagues outfielder who played with several teams from 1918 to 1921. He played with the Dayton Marcos from 1918 to 1920 before splitting the 1921 season with both the Columbus Buckeyes and Chicago Giants. In 1922, he played for the Colored Men's Improvement team based in Dayton, Ohio.
