= Johnny Carr =

American baseball player (born 1887)

- First baseman
- Born: January 1, 1887; Kentucky
- Died: April 7, 1939 (aged 52); Dayton, Ohio

Negro league baseball debut
- 1918, for the Dayton Marcos

Last appearance
- 1920, for the Dayton Marcos
- Stats at Baseball Reference

Teams
- Dayton Marcos (1918, 1920)

John W. Carr (January 1, 1887 – April 7, 1939) was an American Negro league first baseman between 1918 and 1920.

A native of Kentucky, Carr played for the Dayton Marcos in 1918 and again in 1920. In three recorded games, he was hitless with one walk in seven plate appearances.
