= William H. Grant House (Middleport, Ohio) =

Historic house in Ohio, United States

- U.S. National Register of Historic Places
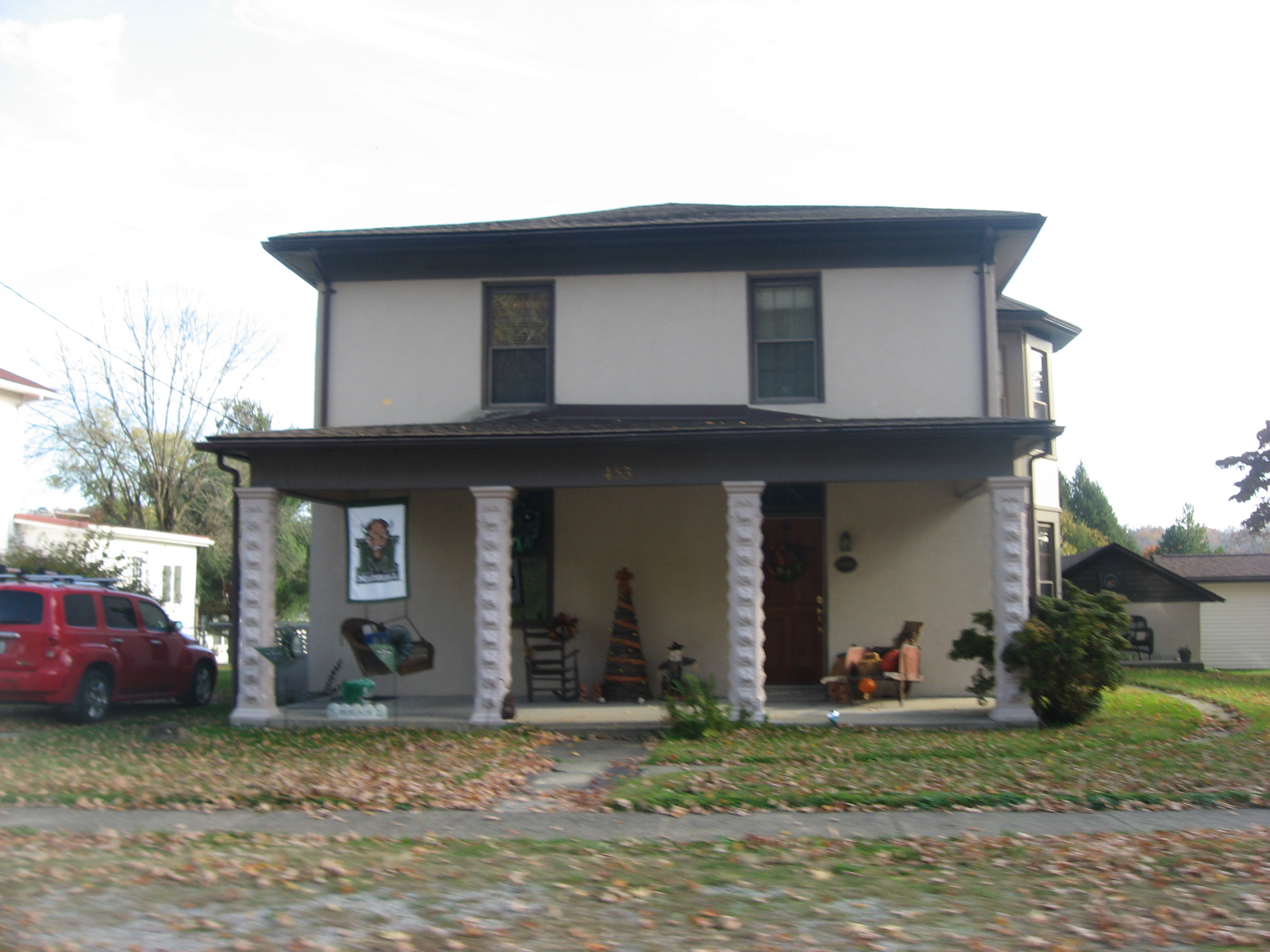
- Front of the house

- Location within Ohio Location within the United States
- Location: 453 Grant St., Middleport, Ohio
- Coordinates: 38°59′59″N 82°3′25″W
- Area: Less than 1 acre (0.40 ha)
- Built: 1852
- NRHP reference No.: 78002136
- Added to NRHP: March 30, 1978

The William H. Grant House is a historic house in Middleport, Ohio, United States. One of the area's earliest concrete houses, it has been designated a historic site.

Built in 1852, the house is constructed of concrete on a foundation of sandstone. Two stories tall, the house is rectangular with a small frame addition to the rear, which was built about ten years after the original part of the house. Born in 1820, William H. Grant pioneered concrete architecture in Meigs County: a small experimental house (no longer in existence) was the first concrete building in the county, and the present house, near the experimental building, was the second.

Besides serving as a residence, the house is a local religious landmark. Before dying in 1845, Johnny Appleseed visited Middleport and converted the Grants to Swedenborgianism. Several other Middleport residents also joined the new religion, and after building the present house, the Grants used it as a meeting place for their coreligionists. In recognition of its place in local history and its distinctive method of construction, the house was listed on the National Register of Historic Places in 1978. It is one of three places in Middleport on the National Register, along with the John Downing Jr. House and the Middleport Public Library.
