= Roy Roberts (baseball) =

American baseball player (1894–1964)

- Pitcher
- Born: June 21, 1894
- Died: January 1, 1964 (aged 69); New York, U.S.
- Batted: Right Threw: Right

debut
- 1916, for the Bacharach Giants

Last appearance
- 1934, for the Cleveland Red Sox

Teams
- Bacharach Giants (1916–1919, 1922–1926); Brooklyn Royal Giants (1920); Columbus Buckeyes (1921); Cleveland Red Sox (1934)

Leroy "Everready" Roberts (June 21, 1894 - January 1, 1964) was an American pitcher in baseball's Negro leagues from 1916 to 1934. He played for several teams, but was mostly associated with the Bacharach Giants. In 1921 he spent a season as the ace pitcher of the Columbus Buckeyes, leading the Negro National League in innings pitched and several other categories while compiling a 7-15 record. His primary pitch was the fastball.
