= Mitchell Murray =

American baseball player (1896-1940)

- Catcher
- Born: January 28, 1896; Wyoming, Ohio, U.S.
- Died: August 12, 1940 (aged 44); Dayton, Ohio, U.S.
- Batted: Right Threw: Right

Negro league baseball debut
- 1919, for the Dayton Marcos

Last appearance
- 1932, for the Indianapolis ABCs

Teams
- Dayton Marcos (1919–1920); Indianapolis ABCs (1920); Cleveland Tate Stars (1922); Toledo Tigers (1923); St. Louis Stars (1923–1928); Chicago American Giants (1928–1930); Indianapolis ABCs (1931–1932)

Mitchell Murray (January 28, 1896 – August 12, 1940), sometimes listed as "Mitchell Murphy", was an American Negro league catcher between 1919 and 1932.

A native of Wyoming, Ohio, Murray made his Negro leagues debut in 1919 with the Dayton Marcos. He enjoyed a long career with several teams, including the St. Louis Stars and Chicago American Giants, and finished his career with the Indianapolis ABCs in 1931 and 1932. Murray died in Dayton, Ohio in 1940 at age 44.
