= National Register of Historic Places listings in Gallia County, Ohio =

Location of Gallia County in Ohio

This is a list of the National Register of Historic Places listings in Gallia County, Ohio.

This is intended to be a complete list of the properties and districts on the National Register of Historic Places in Gallia County, Ohio, United States. The locations of National Register properties and districts for which the latitude and longitude coordinates are included below, may be seen in a Google map.

There are 8 properties and districts listed on the National Register in the county.

This National Park Service list is complete through NPS recent listings posted May 1, 2026.

== Current listings ==
	Name on the Register	Image	Date listed	Location	City or town	Description
1	Davis Mill	Davis Mill	November 28, 1980 (#80003028)	Northeast of Patriot on Cora Mill Rd. 38°49′29″N 82°22′10″W	Perry Township	
2	Evans House	Evans House	July 19, 1984 (#84003692)	Coal Valley Rd., southwest of Vinton; 38°57′59″N 82°26′02″W	Huntington Township	
3	Ewington Academy	Ewington Academy	September 30, 1982 (#82003572)	Ewington Rd. at Ewington; 39°00′36″N 82°21′16″W	Huntington Township	
4	Gallipolis Historic District	Gallipolis Historic District	January 8, 1980 (#80003027)	Roughly bounded by 3rd Ave., Vine and Spruce Sts., and the Ohio River; 38°48′24″N 82°12′20″W	Gallipolis	Originally listed on January 8, 1980 as the "Gallipolis Public Square and Garden Lots Historic District", with boundaries of 1st and 2nd Aves. and Court and State Sts.; boundaries increased and name changed on August 22, 2001
5	Gatewood	Gatewood	October 16, 1986 (#86002877)	76 State St. 38°48′33″N 82°12′23″W	Gallipolis	
6	Ohio Hospital For Epileptics Stone Water Towers	Ohio Hospital For Epileptics Stone Water Towers	September 13, 1978 (#78002069)	Mill Creek Rd. 38°49′17″N 82°11′13″W	Gallipolis	
7	Our House	Our House	November 10, 1970 (#70000494)	434 1st Ave. 38°48′28″N 82°12′13″W	Gallipolis	
8	Wood Old Homestead	Wood Old Homestead	December 14, 1987 (#87002144)	1253 Jackson Pike east of Rio Grande; 38°52′57″N 82°22′03″W	Raccoon Township	

== See also ==
- List of National Historic Landmarks in Ohio
- Listings in neighboring counties: Cabell (WV), Jackson, Lawrence, Mason (WV), Meigs, Vinton
- National Register of Historic Places listings in Ohio
