= Slim Branham =

American baseball player

- Pitcher
- Born: April 7, 1900; Castalian Springs, Tennessee, U.S.
- Died: January 19, 1957 (aged 56); Cleveland, Ohio, U.S.
- Batted: Right Threw: Right

Negro league baseball debut
- 1920, for the Dayton Marcos

Last appearance
- 1932, for the New York Black Yankees
- Stats at Baseball Reference

Teams
- Dayton Marcos (1920); Cleveland Tate Stars (1921–1923); Chicago American Giants (1923); Harrisburg Giants (1924); Homestead Grays (1924); Detroit Stars (1925); St. Louis Stars (1925); Cleveland Elites (1926); Cleveland Hornets (1927); Indianapolis ABCs (1931); New York Black Yankees (1932)

Finis Ernest Branham (April 7, 1900 – January 19, 1957), nicknamed "Slim", was an American Negro league baseball pitcher between 1920 and 1932.

A native of Castalian Springs, Tennessee, Branham made his Negro leagues debut in 1920 with the Dayton Marcos. He went on to play for several teams, and finished his career in 1932 with the New York Black Yankees. Branham died in Cleveland, Ohio in 1957 at age 56.
