= List of people from Leavenworth County, Kansas =

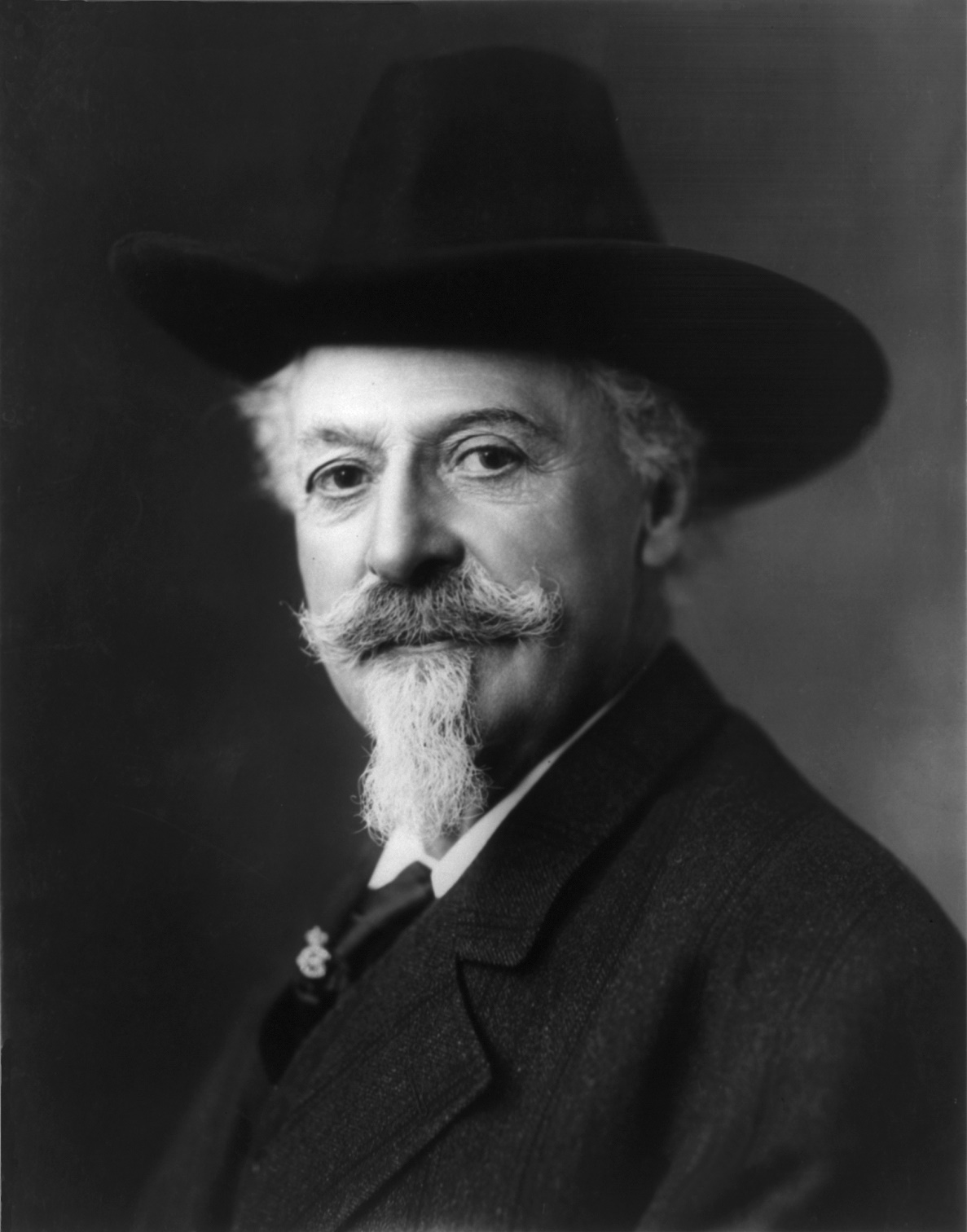
As a young boy, William Frederick "Buffalo Bill" Cody and his family moved to Fort Leavenworth in Kansas Territory.

The following is a list of people from Leavenworth County, Kansas. The area includes Leavenworth, Kansas, Fort Leavenworth, Lansing, and rural areas in the county. Inclusion on the list should be reserved for notable people past and present who have resided in the county, either in cities or rural areas.

== Academia ==
- Donn B. Murphy, instructor of theatre and speech courses at Georgetown University from 1954 to 2000. At the invitation of Jacqueline Kennedy and Letitia Baldrige, he became a theatrical advisor to the John F. Kennedy and Lyndon B. Johnson Administrations for White House dramatic and music presentations in the East Room
- Ernest Fox Nichols, physicist awarded the Rumford Prize by the American Academy of Arts and Sciences in 1905 for his proof that light exerts pressure

== Arts and entertainment ==
- Ashley Aull, competitor in the Miss USA pageant
- Danni Boatwright, sole survivor of the CBS series Survivor: Guatemala; Miss Kansas USA 1996
- Hilda Clark, actress and model
- Buffalo Bill Cody, soldier, buffalo hunter and wild west showman
- Harold Coyle, author
- Charles N. Daniels
- Melissa Etheridge, musician
- Adam Gnade, "talking songs" artist
- Fred Meyers, actor
- Brock Pemberton, theatrical producer, director and founder of the Tony Awards
- N. Clark Smith, music educator and composer
- Randy Sparks, musician, entertainer (New Christy Minstrels)

== Aviation ==
- Paul Poberezny, founder of the Experimental Aircraft Association

== Business ==
- Joseph W. Bettendorf, businessman
- Fred Harvey, prolific restaurateur
- Ron Logan, former Executive Vice President of Walt Disney Entertainment

== Crime and law enforcement ==
- Wild Bill Hickok, soldier, lawman, gunfighter

== Journalism ==
- Elizabeth Vargas, television journalist (ABC)

== Military ==
- Robert Arter, retired United States Army Lieutenant General and former commanding general of the Sixth United States Army.
- Joseph Henderson, United States Army Sergeant, recipient of Medal of Honor
- David G. Perkins, current Commander of the United States Army Combined Arms Center
- Russell Reeder, United States Army officer
- David C. Schilling, U.S. Air Force officer, fighter ace, and leading advocate of long-range jet fighter operations
- John A. Seitz, commanding general of the 1st Infantry Division and the XVIII Airborne Corps
- Richard J. Seitz, Army officer and Paratrooper who commanded the 2nd Battalion, 517th Parachute Infantry Regiment during World War II, the 82nd Airborne Division and the XVIII Airborne Corps

== Politics and government ==
- Daniel Read Anthony, abolitionist, newspaper publisher, mayor in 1863, brother of suffragist Susan B. Anthony
- Daniel Read Anthony, Jr., American Republican politician and a nephew of suffragist and political leader Susan B. Anthony
- Lucien Baker, United States Senator
- Lloyd Llewellyn Black, United States Federal Judge
- William Patterson Borland, United States Representative from Missouri
- William M. Boyle, Democratic political activist
- Thomas Carney, second Governor of Kansas
- Marti Crow, member of the Kansas House of Representatives
- Robert Crozier, United States Senator for Kansas
- Robert E. Davis, Kansas Supreme Court Justice
- Dwight D. Eisenhower, 34th President of the United States, served at Fort Leavenworth
- Thomas Ewing III, 33rd Commissioner of the U.S. Patent Office
- Thomas Ewing, Jr., attorney, the first chief justice of Kansas and leading free state advocate, Union Army general during the American Civil War, and two-term United States Congressman from Ohio
- Henry W. Green, judge on the Kansas Court of Appeals since 1993
- Paul Ranous Greever, United States Representative from Wyoming
- Doug Lamborn, United States Representative from Colorado
- Walter Nelles, co-founder and first chief legal counsel of the National Civil Liberties Bureau and its successor, the American Civil Liberties Union; achieved public notice for his legal work on behalf of pacifists charged with violating the Espionage Act during World War I and in other politically charged civil rights and constitutional law cases in later years
- Andrew Nisbet, Jr., member of the Washington House of Representatives and United States Army officer
- Edward Stillings, lawyer and member of the Kansas Legislature
- Samuel Hanson Stone, politician
- Edward T. Taylor, United States Representative from Colorado
- Van H. Wanggaard, member of the Wisconsin State Senate

== Religion ==
- Sherwood Eddy, Protestant missionary
- William Merrell Vories, educator and missionary

== Sports ==
- Chet Brewer, pitcher in baseball's Negro leagues; played for the Kansas City Monarchs; from 1957 to 1974 he scouted for the Pittsburgh Pirates
- Bill Burwell, relief pitcher in Major League Baseball for the St. Louis Browns and Pittsburgh Pirates
- Duff Cooley, professional baseball player for St. Louis Browns and Detroit Tigers
- Neil Dougherty, basketball coach
- Amy Hastings, track and field long distance running athlete, 2012 American champion in the 10,000 metres, a qualifier for the 2012 Summer Olympics
- Johnny Hetki, Major League baseball player
- Lance Hinson, head coach Saint Mary Spires football team
- Jack Killilay, Major League Baseball player
- Sean Malto, professional skateboarder
- Fred Raymer, major league baseball player
- John Shirreffs, Thoroughbred racehorse trainer
- Wayne Simien, basketball player
- Roy Zimmerman

== See also ==
- Commandant of the United States Army Command and General Staff College
- List of inmates of United States Penitentiary, Leavenworth
- List of Saint Mary Spires head football coaches
- Lists of people from Kansas
