= George Britt =

American baseball player (1895–1981)

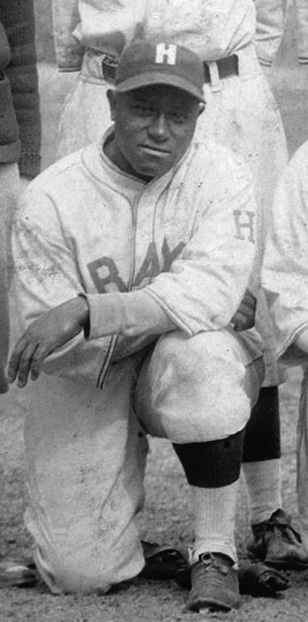
- Pitcher / Utility player
- Born: July 6, 1895; Lexington, Kentucky, U.S.
- Died: January 1981; Erie, Pennsylvania, U.S.
- Batted: Right Threw: Right

Negro league baseball debut
- 1917, for the Indianapolis ABCs

Last appearance
- 1945, for the New Orleans Black Pelicans
- Stats at Baseball Reference

Teams
- Indianapolis ABCs (1917); Dayton Marcos (1919–1920); Columbus Buckeyes (1921); Harrisburg Giants (1922); Baltimore Black Sox (1923–1926); Wilmington Potomacs (1925); Homestead Grays (1928–1933, 1940); Philadelphia Hilldale Giants (1929); Newark Dodgers (1934); Washington Black Senators (1938); Baltimore Elite Giants (1939); Brooklyn Royal Giants (1940); Chicago American Giants (1942); Jacksonville Red Caps (1942); Cleveland Buckeyes (1943–1944); New Orleans Black Pelicans (1945)

Career highlights and awards
- Eastern Colored League ERA leader (1925)

George "Chippy" Britt, also listed as George Britton and George Brittain (July 6, 1895 – January 1981) was an American professional baseball pitcher and utility player in the Negro leagues. He played with several teams from 1917 to 1945. He played every position.
