= John Cunningham (baseball) =

American baseball player

- Shortstop
- Born: August 9, 1892; Montgomery, Alabama, U.S.
- Died: November 16, 1922 (aged 30); Montgomery, Alabama, U.S.
- Batted: Right Threw: Right

debut
- 1912, for the French Lick Plutos

Last appearance
- 1920, for the Dayton Marcos
- Stats at Baseball Reference

Teams
- French Lick Plutos (1912–1913); St. Louis Giants (1917); Dayton Marcos (1918–1920)

John C. Cunningham (August 9, 1892 - November 16, 1922) was an American Negro leagues shortstop and for several years before the founding of the first Negro National League, and in its first season.

A native of Montgomery, Alabama, Cunningham was the older brother of fellow-Negro leaguer Marion Cunningham. He made his Negro leagues debut in 1912 with the French Lick Plutos, and went on to play for the St. Louis Giants and Dayton Marcos.
