= Edward A. Bennett =

United States Army Medal of Honor recipient (1920–1983)

Edward A. Bennett, Jr.
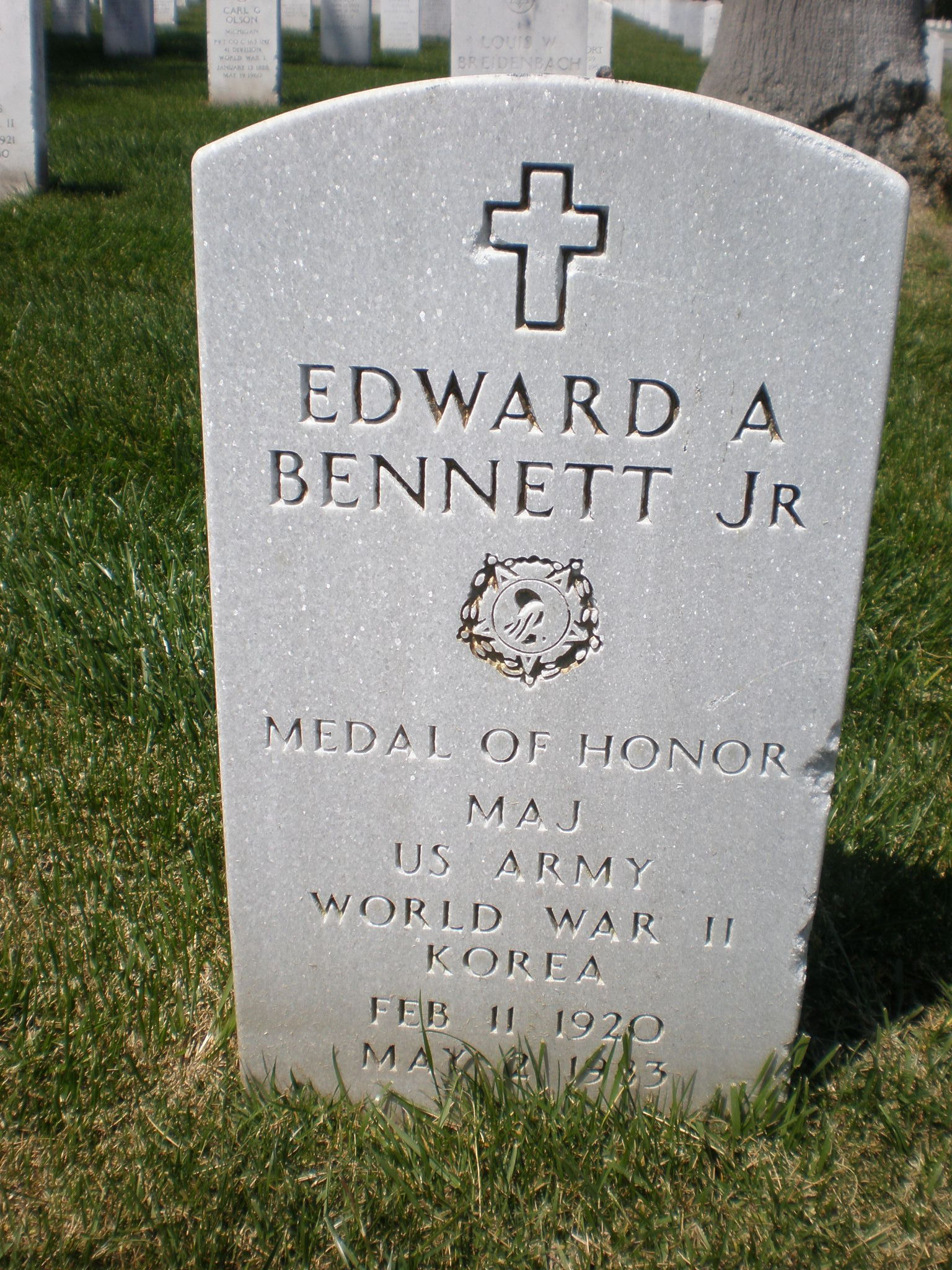
- Bennett's grave marker at Golden Gate National Cemetery
- Born: February 11, 1920; Middleport, Ohio, US
- Died: May 2, 1983 (aged 63); Paradise, Butte County, California, US
- Burial place: Golden Gate National Cemetery; San Bruno, California
- Military career
- Allegiance: United States of America
- Branch: United States Army
- Service years: 1944 – 1962
- Rank: Major
- Units: 1st Battalion, 358th Infantry Regiment, 90th Infantry Division
- Conflicts: World War II; Korean War
- Awards: Medal of Honor; Silver Star; Bronze Star; Purple Heart (4)

Edward Andrew Bennett, Jr. (February 11, 1920 – May 2, 1983) was a United States Army soldier and a recipient of the United States military's highest decoration—the Medal of Honor—for his actions in World War II.

== Biography ==
Bennett was born on February 11, 1920, in Middleport, Ohio. He was drafted into the U.S. Army in January 1944 from Middleport and by February 1, 1945, was serving as a corporal in Company B, 358th Infantry Regiment, 90th Infantry Division. On that day, in Heckhuscheid, Germany, he single-handedly charged a house held by German soldiers, who were firing on his company, and killed the occupants in hand-to-hand combat. For these actions, he was awarded the Medal of Honor eight months later, on October 30, 1945. During his service, he also received the Silver Star, Bronze Star, and four Purple Hearts.

In June 1951, after the start of the Korean War, Bennett became a commissioned officer. He served in Korea and eventually reached the rank of major before his retirement in October 1962 following a heart attack. He died at age 63 on May 2, 1983, and was buried at Golden Gate National Cemetery in San Bruno, California.

== Medal of Honor citation ==
Bennett's official Medal of Honor citation reads:

He was advancing with Company B across open ground to assault Heckhuscheid, Germany, just after dark when vicious enemy machinegun fire from a house on the outskirts of the town pinned down the group and caused several casualties. He began crawling to the edge of the field in an effort to flank the house, persisting in this maneuver even when the hostile machinegunners located him by the light of burning buildings and attempted to cut him down as he made for the protection of some trees. Reaching safety, he stealthily made his way by a circuitous route to the rear of the building occupied by the German gunners. With his trench knife he killed a sentry on guard there and then charged into the darkened house. In a furious hand-to-hand struggle he stormed about a single room which harbored 7 Germans. Three he killed with rifle fire, another he clubbed to death with the butt of his gun, and the 3 others he dispatched with his .45 caliber pistol. The fearless initiative, stalwart combat ability, and outstanding gallantry of Cpl. Bennett eliminated the enemy fire which was decimating his company's ranks and made it possible for the Americans to sweep all resistance from the town.

== See also ==
- List of Medal of Honor recipients for World War II
