= Middleport Public Library =

- U.S. National Register of Historic Places
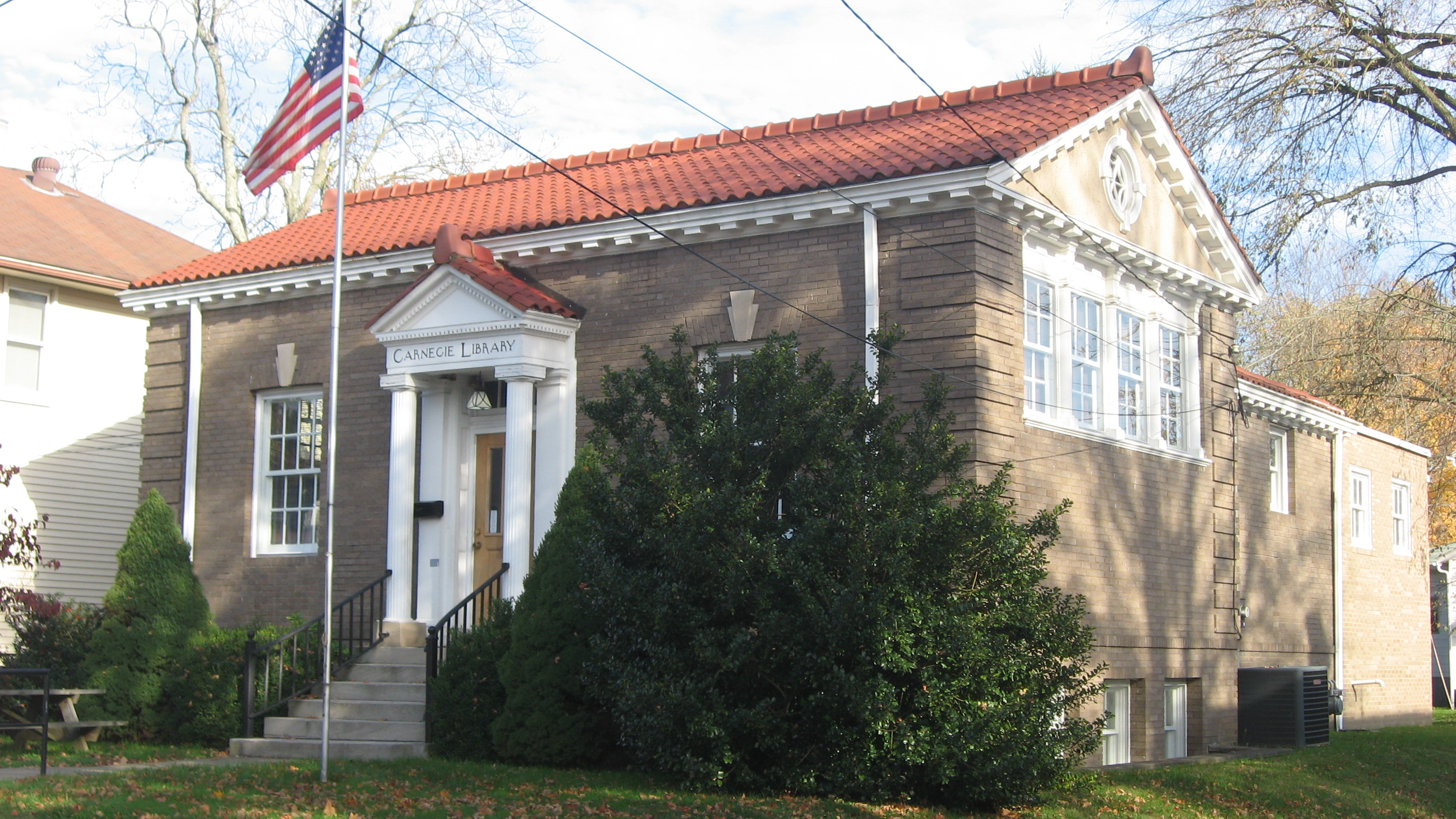
- Front and southern side

- Location within Ohio Location within the United States
- Location: 178 S. Third St., Middleport, Ohio
- Coordinates: 39°0′2″N 82°2′59″W
- Area: Less than 1 acre (0.40 ha)
- Built: 1912
- Architect: Charles P. Kircher
- NRHP reference No.: 86000033
- Added to NRHP: January 6, 1986

The Middleport Public Library is a historic Carnegie library in the Ohio River village of Middleport, Ohio, United States. Built in the early twentieth century, it has been named a historic site.

Middleport was founded as "Sheffield" during the 1820s, a time of great prosperity and rapidly increasing commerce in Meigs County. Among its earliest industries was a cotton mill, built despite the lack of cotton production in the vicinity. Local residents formed the village's first public library in 1908, but its initial location on the second floor of a commercial building soon proved unsatisfactory. One year later, the library's board contacted Andrew Carnegie's Carnegie Corporation in order to begin participating in its library construction program. Negotiations ultimately resulted in the foundation agreeing to provide the village with construction money, and the building was completed in 1912 under the direction of Athens contractor Charles Kirchner.

The Middleport library is a brick building with a tiled roof and a brick foundation. Its architecture is generally simple, although some details of the facade display a Georgian Revival architectural flavor; some of the more ornate examples are the pediment above the portico, the quoins, and the dentils underneath the pediment and the cornice. In January 1986, the library was listed on the National Register of Historic Places. It qualified for inclusion under two different criteria: its architecture, which makes the library Middleport's most distinctive public building, and for its place in local history — besides its status as an example of small-town Carnegie libraries, it remained an icon of Middleport's early twentieth-century community activities. The library is one of three Middleport locations on the National Register, along with the John Downing Jr. House and the William H. Grant House.

The Middleport library currently is operated as a branch of Meigs County District Public Library system.
