= Roy Tyler =

American baseball player (1899–1984)

- Outfielder
- Born: December 5, 1899; Olmstead, Kentucky, U.S.
- Died: August 22, 1984 (aged 84); Kalamazoo, Michigan, U.S.
- Batted: Right Threw: Right

Negro league baseball debut
- 1925, for the Chicago American Giants

Last appearance
- 1926, for the Cleveland Elites

Career statistics
- Batting average: .301
- Home runs: 0
- Runs batted in: 20

Teams
- Chicago American Giants (1925); St. Louis Stars (1925); Cleveland Elites (1926)

Roy Tyler (December 5, 1899 – August 22, 1984) was an American Negro league outfielder in 1925 and 1926.

A native of Olmstead, Kentucky, Tyler was one of 63 soldiers of the 24th Infantry Regiment convicted of mutiny in the Houston riot of 1917. While serving time at Leavenworth Federal Penitentiary, Tyler honed his baseball skills. He played for the prison's African American team, known as the "Booker T's", a team that produced three other future Negro leaguers: David Wingfield, Albert Street, and Joe Fleet. In 1924, Tyler was paroled to the custody of Rube Foster for the purpose of playing for Foster's Chicago American Giants. He played for the Giants during the 1925 season, and then spent 1926 with the Cleveland Elites. Tyler was convicted of violating parole in 1929, and spent the next three years at Indiana Reformatory before being returned to Leavenworth until his release in 1936. He died in Kalamazoo, Michigan in 1984 at age 84.

Prior to 2024, Tyler was credited by historians with playing a game for the Columbus Red Birds in 1933 until it was noted that he was incarcerated in Leavenworth at that time. Further research revealed that he also played for the 1925 St. Louis Stars but was miscredited as "Eddie Tyler" by historians.
