= Keith Lyons =

Australian sports scientist (1952–2020)

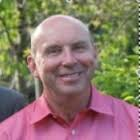
- Born: 7 May 1952; Buckley, Wales
- Died: 13 May 2020 (aged 68); Canberra, Australian Capital Territory, Australia

Keith Lyons (7 May 1952 – 13 May 2020) was an educator and sport scientist who specialized in the observation and analysis of performance in sport. He was the author of the first book on the use of video in sport. Lyons founded the Centre for Notational Analysis at the Cardiff Institute of Higher Education in 1992 with the help of John Pugh, Peter Treadwell, David Cobner and Sean Power. He moved to Australia in 2002 to take up a position as the founding Coordinator of Performance Analysis at the Australian Institute of Sport. He was the founding Director of the Institute of Sport Studies at the University of Canberra in 2009. Lyons blogged about his work in teaching, coaching and performance on the "Clyde Street" blog from 2008 onwards.

== Personal ==
Lyons was born in Buckley, Flintshire, Wales on 7 May 1952. His parents were Donald and Joan Lyons. His siblings were footballer John and Judith. His brother committed suicide in 1982.

Keith Lyons attended the Alun School, Mold (1963–70), the University of York (1970–73), Loughborough College (1974–75), the London School of Economics and Political Science (1980-82) and the University of Surrey (1983–89). His PhD at the University of Surrey was titled 'A sociological analysis of the teaching of boys' physical education in the secondary school'.

He played rugby for Ruthin RFC, University of York, Loughborough College, London Welsh RFC and Rosslyn Park FC. He represented North Wales at rugby union and played against three international touring teams, Tonga national rugby union team, Romania and the Welsh President's XV. After his retirement from rugby union, Lyons coached St Mary's College and Exeter University rugby union teams. He coached women's lacrosse and was an assistant coach to the Welsh team at the 1997 Lacrosse World Cup in Japan. He was the national coach for whitewater slalom (canoe slalom) in Wales 1998–2002. Lyons was a physical education teacher at Whitton Comprehensive School, Richmond-upon-Thames (1975–78), a lecturer in human movement studies at St. Mary's College.

Lyons lived in Braidwood, New South Wales and was a volunteer member of the NSW Rural Fire Service. He was married to Sue and they had two children, Beth and Sam.

Lyons died on 13 May 2020 in Canberra Hospital of cerebral lymphoma.

== Analysing performance ==
=== Early years ===
Lyons' experience of sport and physical education led him to think about the systematic observation and analysis of player, teacher and coach behaviour. At Loughborough College, he was introduced to a range of ideas that informed his interest in the observation and analysis of performance. These included Rudolf Laban's effort notation and teaching games for understanding.

At this time he met three leaders in the coaching of rugby union Ray Williams, Tony Gray and Jim Greenwood. This combination of experiences in teacher education and coaching framed Lyons' professional practice in notation and performance analysis. He started notating real-time performance in rugby union games in 1978 when he was appointed coach of the St Mary's College rugby union team. He qualified as a Welsh Rugby Union coach that year. By 1980, he was teaching courses in match analysis to students in the Human Movement Studies degree at St Mary's College. These courses used some of the early literature in notational analysis.

At that time Lyons formed a close working relationship with the head of the audio-visual department at the College, Mike Murnane, and was able to use some of the early domestic video cameras to record rugby union games for lapsed-time analysis. Lyons and Murnane worked with women's hockey and lacrosse to support coach education courses. In 1982 they recorded all games played at the inaugural Women's Lacrosse World Cup at the Trent Bridge cricket ground, Nottingham.

At that time (the early 1980s) there was an emerging interest in the United Kingdom in the analysis of performance in sport and physical education. Celia Brackenridge and John Alderson reported on some of this work. The first workshop to discuss the role of video in sport was organised by Les Burwitz in 1986. Lyons' book provided an overview of the emerging use of video in the analysis of performance. His PhD thesis extended that work to share a qualitative account of teaching physical education that drew upon systematic observation protocols.

=== Working with sporting organizations ===
Throughout the 1980s, Lyons provided analyses of performance to club and international rugby union teams. In 1991, he was appointed as the notational analyst for the Welsh Rugby Union and attended the Rugby World Cup. A year later, with the help of colleagues in the School of Sport at the Cardiff Institute of Higher Education he established the Centre for Notational Analysis. The Centre was planned as a service to sport with the explicit aim of working with sport organizations to adopt real-time and lapsed-time analyses of performance in training and competition environments. During the 1990s, the clients of the Centre included The Welsh Rugby Union, the Football Association of Wales, the Football Association, Great Britain Hockey, the Welsh Lacrosse Association and the Welsh Canoeing Association. The Centre worked to support the British Lions rugby union tour of South Africa in 1997, provided a video service for the International Federation of Women's Lacrosse Associations at the 1997 World Cup in Japan and serviced the South African football team at the 1998 FIFA World Cup in France.

Lyons was a member of the Welsh Rugby Union's Senior, A and Under 21 management team from 1995 to 1998 and was one of the first officially recognized performance analysts in world rugby union.

The centre was renamed the Centre for Performance Analysis in 1997. This name change marked an important epistemological shift in the work of the Centre. Thereafter work with sporting organizations focused on performance in applied contexts and staff at the centre developed expertise in educational technology. Lyons left his role of director of the centre in 1998 but continued to work with the centre up until his departure for Australia in 2002 to take up a position at the inaugural co-ordinator of the Performance Analysis Unit at the Australian Institute of Sport (AIS). In 2006, he was appointed head of biomechanics and performance analysis at the AIS.

He was appointed professor of sport studies at the University of Canberra in 2009. He retired from the university in 2013. During his time at the university, he supervised PhD candidates in numerous disciplines, including nursing, sports, biomechanics and sports management.

From 2013 to 2017, the Rugby Football Union and England Wales Cricket Board engaged Lyons on a ‘learning journey’ project with some of their ten of the top professional coaches.

During his time in Australia, Lyons made a significant contribution to paddling as a Paddle Australia director (2009-2013) as well as a volunteer, coach, parent and sports scientist in slalom canoeing.

=== Open sharing ===
In 2011, the International Journal of Computer Science in Sport published Lyons' paper Sport Coaches' Use of Cloud Computing: From Here to Ubiquity. In it he explained his interest in open sharing and the use of cloud computing resources so to do. The abstract of his paper:

Cloud computing is providing sport coaches with opportunities to transform their work with athletes. This paper identifies characteristics of cloud computing and discusses sport coaches' use of the 'Cloud'. Examples are presented of this use in the sport of canoeing in Australia. The paper examines some of the risks inherent in a move to cloud computing whilst acknowledging the dynamic possibilities available from new ways of communicating. The paper concludes with a discussion of the use of iterative 'good enough' approaches to digital repositories.

The curation and aggregation of digital resources has been one of Lyons' primary concerns in his career. He was an early adopter of social media resources, particularly microblogging services, as they emerged in digital computing.

=== Anti-apartheid activities ===
Whilst at the University of York, Lyons specialized in the study of the politics of Southern Africa. Under the supervision of Christopher Hill and Adrian Leftwich, he used his interest in sport to investigate the impact of South Africa's apartheid policy on sport opportunity. His undergraduate thesis was titled Sanctions against Apartheid Sport. During that time he was introduced to Dennis Brutus and was given access to the archived papers of the Capricorn Africa Society held at York as a primary source for his research. Years later he met Sam Ramsamy and Peter Hain. He became involved in the activities of South Africa non-racial Olympic Committee (SAN-ROC) and spoke out as a rugby union player about the impact of apartheid on sport. As a result of these activities he was placed on a list of sportsmen excluded from traveling to South Africa. He was able to visit South Africa in 1995 as a member of the management team for the Welsh rugby union team participating in the World Cup.
