= Killing of Kaylea Titford =

2020 death in Wales

- Location: Newtown, Powys, Wales
- Victim: Kaylea Louise Titford
- Charges: Manslaughter by gross negligence
- Verdict: Guilty
- Convictions: Alun Titford (7 years and 6 months, 10 years after review); Sarah Lloyd-Jones (6 years, eight years after review)
- Convicted: Alun Titford; Sarah Lloyd-Jones
- Judge: Martin Griffiths

On 10 October 2020, Kaylea Louise Titford (27 September 2004–10 October 2020) was found dead in her house in Newtown, Powys, Wales. She was born with spina bifida, leaving her reliant on a wheelchair. When her death was discovered, she had been "left to die" in unsanitary conditions found by the court to be "unfit for any animal".

== Abuse and death ==
During the COVID-19 lockdown, between March 2020 and the date of her death, she was bedridden and reliant on her parents for help. During this period, she was largely left on her own, going without showering for several months and defecating in her bed. She was fed a diet largely made of fast food which contributed to her obesity. She and her sister called for help dealing with the flies and the general filth and toileting assistance in multiple text messages in the weeks before her death. There were also numerous calls from her secondary school regarding her welfare in which her mother repeatedly lied as to why Kaylea could not attend her lessons. In addition, the parents had repeatedly refused help from services such as the Birmingham Children's Hospital and a youth intervention service.

Her parents "caused her death by shocking and prolonged neglect" during the COVID-19 lockdown between March 2020 and the date of her death. The medical cause of death was recorded as "inflammation and infection in extensive areas of ulceration arising from obesity and its complications, and immobility in a girl with spina bifida and hydrocephalus". Her mother, Sarah Lloyd-Jones, pleaded guilty to manslaughter by gross negligence in December 2022, and, following a three-week trial at Mold Crown Court, her father Alun Titford was found guilty of the same charge in January 2023.

When Kaylea Titford was discovered, her room was full of rubbish and fly faeces surrounded by soiled housetraining pads for dogs and uncollected bottles of urine from her catheter. When police officers moved her body, there were flies and maggots where she had once been lying and in her bedding. The night of her death, she had repeatedly called her parents for help, only to be told to "stop screeching". At her death, she weighed 22 stone 13 pounds (321 lb; 146 kg) and had a body mass index of 70, making her morbidly obese. The court found that her death was caused by gross negligence from her parents.

== Conviction and sentencing ==
It was the first time in the UK that parents have been prosecuted for manslaughter for not managing their child's weight, as most cases dealing with childhood obesity are dealt with in family courts. However, failing to manage Kaylea's weight was only one of several prosecutable failures in their parental duty of care. The others listed by the court were: ensuring that Kaylea did not stay immobile for periods detrimental to her health and wellbeing, ensuring that she was living in a safe and hygienic environment, ensuring that her person was maintained to a hygienic physical standard, ensuring that her physical health needs were met, and ensuring that needed medical assistance was sought. The pair was sentenced at Swansea Crown Court on 7 March before judge Martin Griffiths, whose remarks were televised. It was the first hearing in Wales to be televised after the law was changed the past year for cameras to be allowed in court.

Alun Titford was sentenced to 7 years and 6 months, while Sarah Lloyd-Jones was sentenced to 6 years. Judge Martin Griffiths held that both parents were "both equally responsible and were both equally culpable".

The Solicitor General referred the conviction to the Court of Appeal under the Unduly Lenient Sentences Scheme for review. On 19 May 2023, the Court of Appeal increased their sentences after a full hearing. Sarah Lloyd-Jones's sentence was increased to 8 years, and Alun Titford's sentence was increased to 10 years. Solicitor General, Michael Tomlinson KC MP, stated: "This was a deeply distressing and upsetting case, and my thoughts today are with all of those who loved Kaylea. Kaylea was subjected to horrific neglect by her parents and the court's decision to extend Alun Titford and Sarah Lloyd Jones' sentences sends a clear message that child abuse will never be tolerated."
