= Middleport, Ohio =

- Village
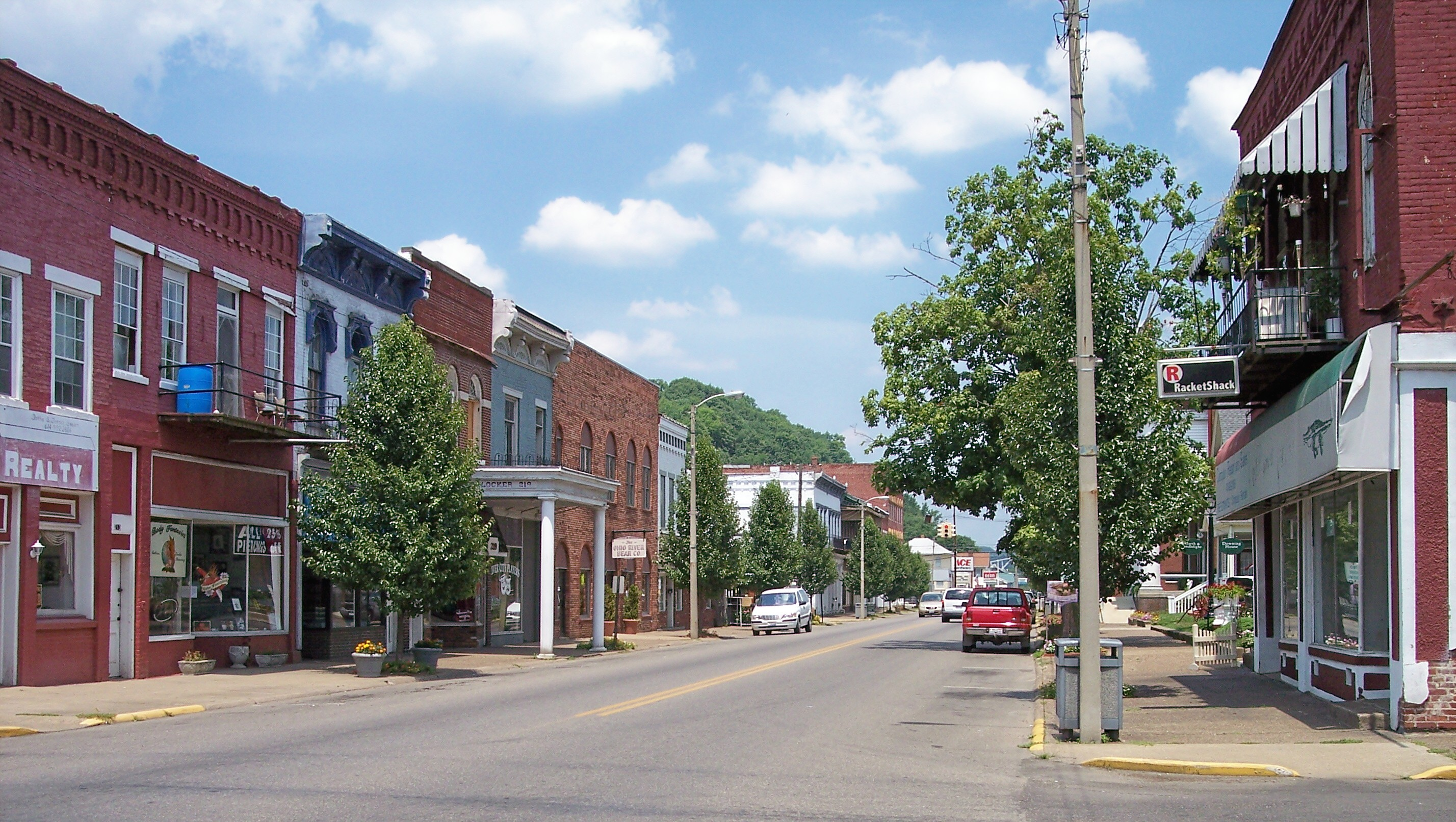
- North 2nd Avenue in downtown Middleport in 2007

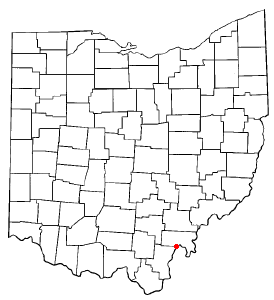
- Location of Middleport, Ohio

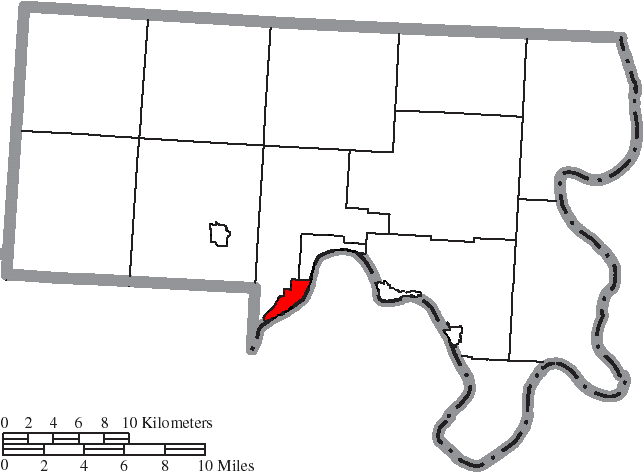
- Location of Middleport in Meigs County
- Coordinates: 38°00′05″N 82°03′30″W
- Country: United States
- State: Ohio
- County: Meigs
- Township: Salisbury

Area
  - Total: 1.90 sq mi (4.91 km^{2})
  - Land: 1.80 sq mi (4.66 km^{2})
  - Water: 0.097 sq mi (0.25 km^{2})
- Elevation: 568 ft (173 m)

Population (2020)
  - Total: 2,208
  - Density: 1,227.8/sq mi (474.07/km^{2})
- Time zone: UTC-5 (Eastern (EST))
  - Summer (DST): UTC-4 (EDT)
- ZIP code: 45760
- Area code: 740
- FIPS code: 39-49756
- GNIS feature ID: 2399333
- Website: Village website

Middleport is the largest village in Meigs County, Ohio, along the Ohio River. The population was 2,208 at the time of the 2020 census.

== History ==
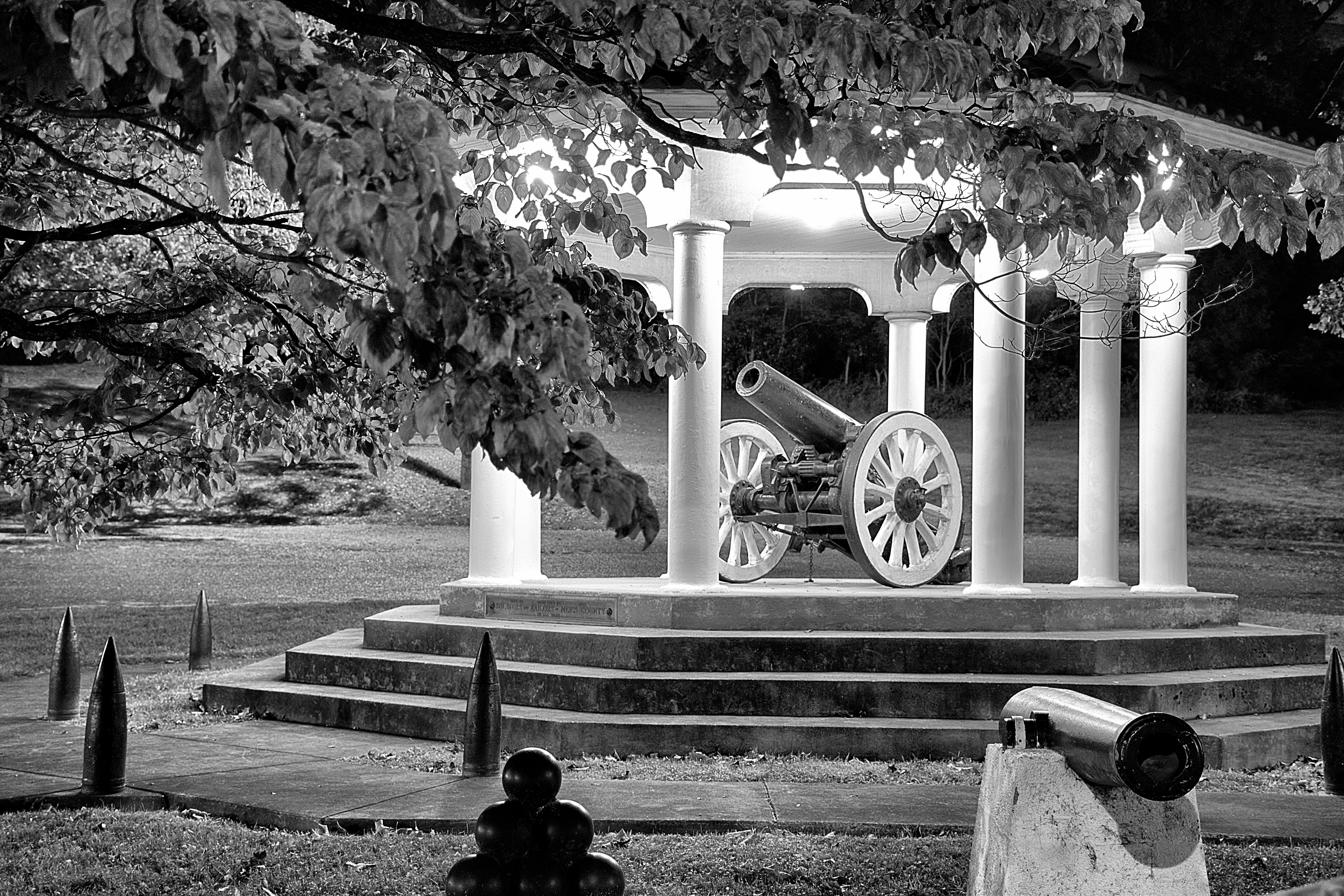
Soldiers and Sailors Monument

Middleport was founded during the 1820s, a time of great prosperity and rapidly increasing commerce in Meigs County. Among its earliest industries was a cotton mill, built despite the lack of cotton production in the vicinity. The village was founded as "Sheffield", and throughout its history it has also used the names of "Coalport" and "Salisbury". The name Middleport refers to the city's location on the Ohio River halfway between Pittsburgh and Cincinnati. Three Middleport buildings, the John Downing Jr. House, the William H. Grant House, and the Middleport Public Library, are listed on the National Register of Historic Places.

== Geography ==
Middleport is located along the Ohio River at the mouth of Leading Creek.

According to the United States Census Bureau, the village has a total area of 1.90 square miles (4.92 km^{2}), of which 1.80 square miles (4.66 km^{2}) is land and 0.10 square miles (0.26 km^{2}) is water.

== Demographics ==
Historical population
Census	Pop.	Note	%±
1870	2,236		—
1880	3,032		35.6%
1890	3,211		5.9%
1900	2,799		−12.8%
1910	3,194		14.1%
1920	3,772		18.1%
1930	3,505		−7.1%
1940	3,356		−4.3%
1950	3,446		2.7%
1960	3,373		−2.1%
1970	2,784		−17.5%
1980	2,971		6.7%
1990	2,725		−8.3%
2000	2,525		−7.3%
2010	2,530		0.2%
2020	2,208		−12.7%
U.S. Decennial Census

=== 2010 census ===
As of the census of 2010, there were 2,530 people, 1,089 households, and 649 families living in the village. The population density was 1,405.6 inhabitants per square mile (542.7/km^{2}). There were 1,299 housing units at an average density of 721.7 per square mile (278.6/km^{2}). The racial makeup of the village was 94.5% White, 3.0% African American, 0.4% Native American, 0.2% Asian, 0.2% from other races, and 1.6% from two or more races. Hispanic or Latino of any race were 0.6% of the population.

There were 1,089 households, of which 28.9% had children under the age of 18 living with them, 36.4% were married couples living together, 16.5% had a female householder with no husband present, 6.7% had a male householder with no wife present, and 40.4% were non-families. 35.9% of all households were made up of individuals, and 16.1% had someone living alone who was 65 years of age or older. The average household size was 2.23 and the average family size was 2.84.

The median age in the village was 42.5 years. 21.3% of residents were under the age of 18; 8.2% were between the ages of 18 and 24; 23.4% were from 25 to 44; 26.6% were from 45 to 64; and 20.4% were 65 years of age or older. The gender makeup of the village was 46.1% male and 53.9% female.

=== 2000 census ===
As of the census of 2000, there were 2,525 people, 1,103 households, and 659 families living in the village. The population density was 1,396.1 inhabitants per square mile (539.0/km^{2}). There were 1,243 housing units at an average density of 687.3 per square mile (265.4/km^{2}). The racial makeup of the village was 95.64% White, 2.38% African American, 0.36% Native American, 0.16% Asian, 0.12% from other races, and 1.35% from two or more races. Hispanic or Latino of any race were 0.55% of the population.

There were 1,103 households, out of which 27.1% had children under the age of 18 living with them, 41.5% were married couples living together, 14.0% had a female householder with no husband present, and 40.2% were non-families. 35.7% of all households were made up of individuals, and 17.6% had someone living alone who was 65 years of age or older. The average household size was 2.23 and the average family size was 2.89.

In the village, the population was spread out, with 22.9% under the age of 18, 9.2% from 18 to 24, 24.5% from 25 to 44, 23.3% from 45 to 64, and 20.1% who were 65 years of age or older. The median age was 40 years. For every 100 females, there were 81.7 males. For every 100 females age 18 and over, there were 77.6 males.

The median income for a household in the village was $22,532, and the median income for a family was $29,349. Males had a median income of $27,264 versus $21,875 for females. The per capita income for the village was $13,138. About 16.3% of families and 24.1% of the population were below the poverty line, including 30.4% of those under age 18 and 17.6% of those age 65 or over.

== Education ==
Public education in the village of Middleport is provided by the Meigs Local School District. Campuses serving the village include Meigs Primary School (Grades K-2), Meigs Intermediate School (Grades 3–5), Meigs Middle School (Grades 6–8), and Meigs High School (Grades 9-12).

Middleport has a public library, a branch of the Meigs County District Public Library.

== Notable people ==
- Sam Allen, jazz pianist
- Edward A. Bennett, United States Army soldier
- Dave Diles, sportscaster and journalist
- James V. Hartinger, United States Air Force general
- Don Jefferson, pitcher in Negro league baseball
- Wade Johnston, baseball player
- Art Lewis, football player and coach
- William W. Outerbridge, United States Navy officer
- Mother Watson, MLB player
