= David Wingfield =

American baseball player (1894–??)

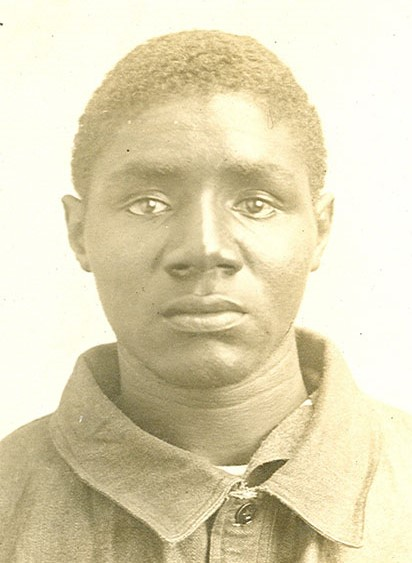
- Second baseman
- Born: April 21, 1894; Washington, Georgia, U.S.
- Died: Unknown; Unknown
- Batted: Right Threw: Right

Negro league baseball debut
- 1920, for the Dayton Marcos

Last appearance
- 1923, for the Toledo Tigers

Career statistics
- Batting average: .259
- Home runs: 2
- Runs batted in: 36

Teams
- Dayton Marcos (1920); Detroit Stars (1921); Toledo Tigers (1923)

David Wingfield (April 21, 1894 – date of death unknown) was an American Negro league second baseman between 1920 and 1923.

A native of Washington, Georgia, Wingfield was court-martialed for a fatal gun fight on December 5, 1915, that left an officer dead, while serving in the 10th Cavalry Regiment. He was found guilty and sentenced to 10 years in prison. Wingfield arrived at Leavenworth, Kansas on May 24, 1916, at the age of twenty-two. At Leavenworth Federal Penitentiary, Wingfield honed his baseball skills. He played for the prison's African American team, known as the "Booker T's", a team that produced three other future Negro leaguers: Roy Tyler, Albert Street, and Joe Fleet. He was released from Leavenworth in 1919, and quickly found work in professional baseball. His Negro leagues debut came in 1920 for the Dayton Marcos, and he went on to play for the Detroit Stars and Toledo Tigers.
