= Alonzo Longware =

American baseball player

- Third baseman
- Born: March 27, 1891; Shreveport, Louisiana, U.S.
- Died: March 30, 1961 (aged 70); Los Angeles, California, U.S.
- Threw: Right

debut
- 1920, for the Indianapolis ABCs

Last appearance
- 1920, for the Detroit Stars

Teams
- Indianapolis ABCs (1920); Detroit Stars (1920)

Alonzo Longware (March 27, 1891 - March 30, 1961) was an American Negro leagues third baseman at the founding of the first Negro National League. He started the 1920 season playing for the Indianapolis ABCs and was traded during the first week of May to the Detroit Stars.
