= Don Jefferson =

American baseball player

- Catcher
- Born: August 15, 1895; Middleport, Ohio
- Died: April 17, 1994 (aged 98); Pittsburgh, Pennsylvania

Negro league baseball debut
- 1920, for the Dayton Marcos

Last appearance
- 1921, for the Pittsburgh Keystones

Teams
- Dayton Marcos (1920); Pittsburgh Keystones (1921)

Donald C. Jefferson (August 15, 1895 – April 17, 1994) was an American Negro league catcher in the 1920s.

A native of Middleport, Ohio, Jefferson attended Ohio State University. He played for the Dayton Marcos in 1920, and for the Pittsburgh Keystones the following season. Jefferson died in Pittsburgh, Pennsylvania in 1994 at age 98.
