= Marion Cunningham (baseball) =

American baseball player

- First baseman
- Born: December 30, 1895; Montgomery, Alabama, U.S.
- Died: January 28, 1982 (aged 86); Montgomery, Alabama, U.S.

Negro league baseball debut
- 1921, for the Montgomery Grey Sox

Last appearance
- 1925, for the Memphis Red Sox
- Stats at Baseball Reference

Teams
- Montgomery Grey Sox (1921); Memphis Red Sox (1924–1925)

Marion Cunningham (December 30, 1895 – January 28, 1982), nicknamed "Daddy", was an American Negro league first baseman in the 1920s.

A native of Montgomery, Alabama, Cunningham was the younger brother of fellow-Negro leaguer John Cunningham. He made his Negro leagues debut in 1921 with the Montgomery Grey Sox, and went on to play for the Memphis Red Sox in 1924 and 1925. Cunningham died in Montgomery in 1982 at age 86.
