= Joe Fleet =

American baseball player (1903/04–??)

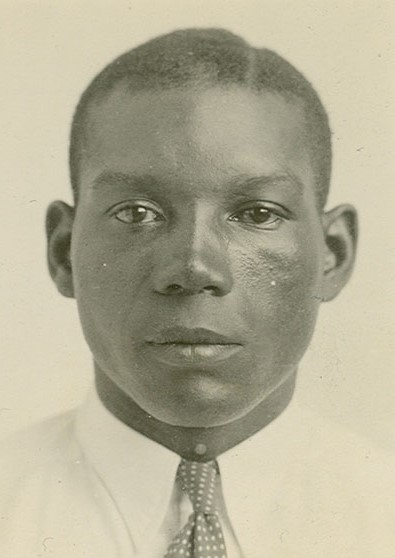
- Pitcher
- Born: 1903 or 1904

Negro league baseball debut
- 1930, for the Chicago American Giants

Last appearance
- 1930, for the Chicago American Giants

Career statistics
- Win–loss record: 0–1
- Earned run average: 8.31
- Strikeouts: 2
- Stats at Baseball Reference

Teams
- Chicago American Giants (1930)

Joe Fleet (1903 or 1904 – death date unknown) was an American Negro league pitcher.

Fleet honed his baseball skills at Leavenworth Federal Penitentiary in the 1920s. He played for the prison's African American team, known as the "Booker T's", a team that produced three other future Negro leaguers: Roy Tyler, Albert Street, and David Wingfield. Fleet was paroled to the Chicago American Giants in 1930, and pitched in one game for manager Jim Brown, and may have also played briefly for the Memphis Red Sox that season.
