= Jack Downing (footballer) =

English footballer (1913–1962)

Personal information
- Full name: John Westness Downing
- Date of birth: 8 May 1913
- Place of birth: Darlington, Durham, England
- Date of death: 7 February 1962 (aged 48)
- Place of death: Darlington, Durham
- Positions: Inside left; centre forward

Senior career*
Years	Team	Apps	(Gls)
- Evenwood Town
193?–1933	Darlington	2	(3)
- Spennymoor United
- Stockton
193?–194?	Shildon		
- * Club domestic league appearances and goals

John Westness Downing (8 May 1913 – 7 February 1962) was an English amateur footballer who played in the Football League for Darlington. He played non-league football for Evenwood Town, Spennymoor United, Stockton and Shildon. He played either at inside left or centre forward.

== Family ==
Downing, who was also an amateur cricketer, was the younger son of Mr. and Mrs. J. Downing of Cartmell Terrace, Darlington. He had a sister, Doris. In 1940, he married Elsie Wilson in Darlington.

== Football career ==
Downing joined Football League club Darlington from Evenwood Town. While still a Darlington reserve, in February 1933, he was selected for a Football Association Amateur XI to play against a Universities Athletic Union team. The students scored five times in the first twenty minutes of the second half, but the FA Amateurs nearly caught up, Downing scoring their fourth as the game ended 5–4. He made his debut for Darlington in the Third Division North in the penultimate match of the 1932–33 Football League season, at home to Carlisle United. Darlington won 5–2, and Downing scored a hat-trick. He kept his place for the final game of the season, but that was the end of his League career. Darlington finished bottom of the division, so had to apply for re-election to the League for the following season, and the directors chose to retain the services of only five players.

He moved into non-league football, going via Spennymoor United to Stockton. While a Stockton player, he was selected for the Northern League representative side to play the Yorkshire League in April 1935. His next club was Shildon. Playing at centre forward, he contributed 61 goals in league and cup competition in the 1936–37 season. as Shildon won their fourth consecutive Northern League title. In 1938, he was again selected for an FA Amateur XI to play the Universities, and was still a Shildon player in 1940 when normal competition had been abandoned for the duration of the Second World War.
