= John Downing (photographer) =

British photographer (1940–2020)

- Born: 17 April 1940; Llanelli, Wales
- Died: 8 April 2020 (aged 79)
- Occupation: Photographer

John Downing (17 April 1940 – 8 April 2020) was a British photographer.

== Biography ==
Downing was born on 17 April 1940 in Llanelli, Wales. He began his career as an apprentice photographer in 1956 for the Daily Mail, staying until 1961. He then worked for the Daily Express as a freelancer from 1962 to 1964, and then as a full-time photographer until 2001. He became head of the photography department in 1985.

Significant events covered by Downing include the Vietnam War, the Bosnian Genocide, the Rwandan Genocide, the War in Afghanistan, and the Chernobyl disaster. He was the only photographer present at the Grand Brighton Hotel during an assassination attempt on Margaret Thatcher on 12 October 1984.

He was honored in the World Press Photo of the Year contest three times: 1972, 1978, and 1981. He was awarded British Press Photographer of the Year in 1977, 1979, 1980, 1981, 1984, 1988, and 1989. He was inducted into the Order of the British Empire in 1992 for his "service to journalism".

Downing founded the British Press Photographers Association in 1984. In 2001, he retired from the Daily Express and became a freelance photographer. He died on 8 April 2020 at the age of 79.
