= John Downing Jr. House =

Historic house in Ohio, United States

- U.S. National Register of Historic Places
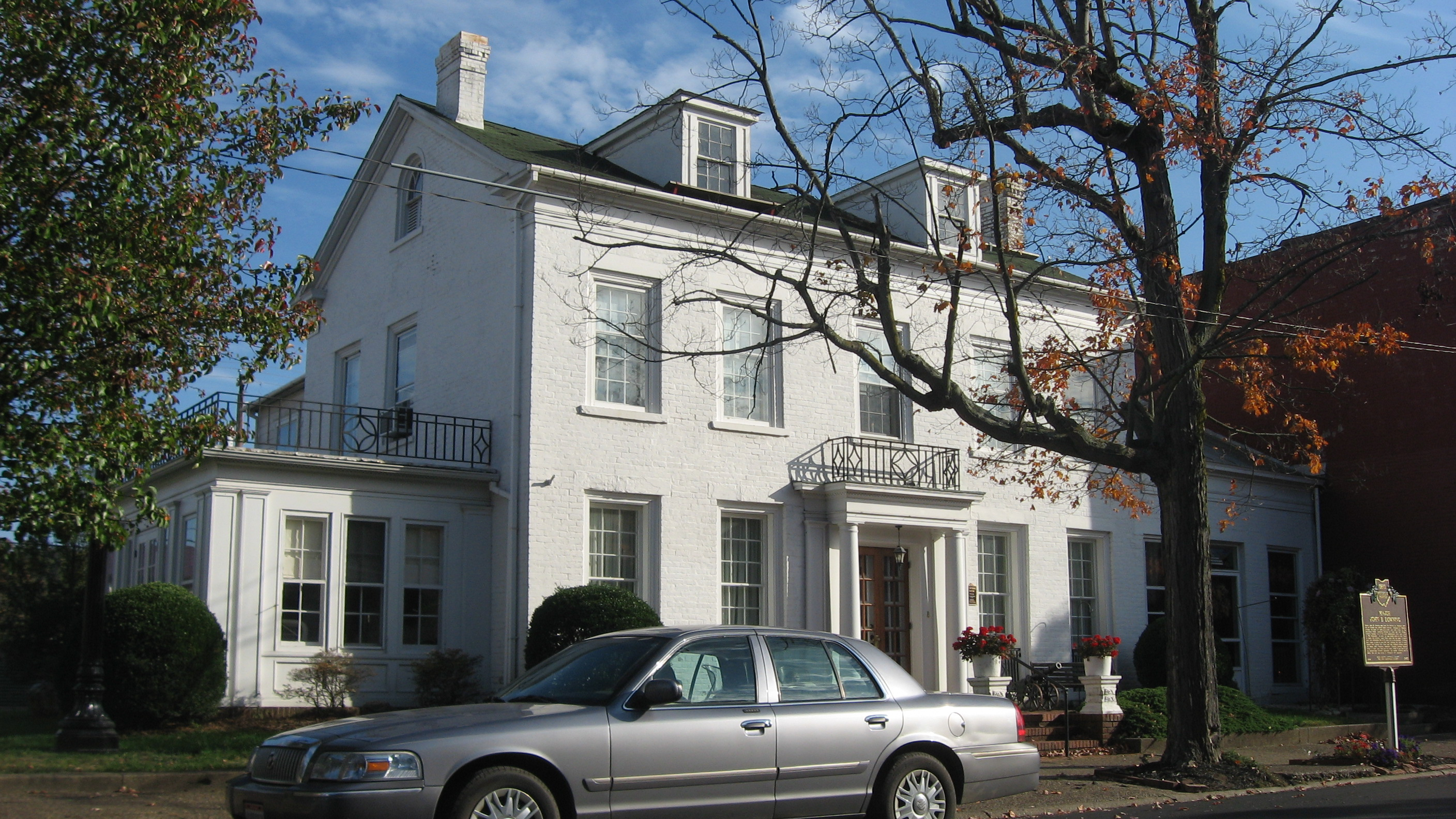
- Front of the house

- Location within Ohio Location within the United States
- Location: 220-232 N. Second Ave., Middleport, Ohio
- Coordinates: 39°0′12″N 82°2′51″W
- Area: Less than 1 acre (0.40 ha)
- Built: 1859
- Architect: Frederick Crowther, R.A. Miller
- Architectural style: Colonial Revival
- NRHP reference No.: 93000403
- Added to NRHP: May 6, 1993

The John Downing Jr. House is a historic house in downtown Middleport, a village located on the banks of the Ohio River in the southeastern part of the U.S. state of Ohio. Built in 1859, it was the home of prominent Middleport resident John B. Downing. Known to his intimates as "Major" Downing, he worked for much of his life as a pilot for riverboats on the Mississippi River. Notably, his work with the young Samuel Clemens led to a literary appearance years later: writing under the name of "Mark Twain", Clemens portrayed him in the book Life on the Mississippi. One of his two sons, John B. Jr., was the house's namesake

Downing's house in Middleport is a brick building with a foundation of sandstone, an asphalt roof, and elements of wood and various types of metal. Designed by R.A. Miller and Frederick Crowther, it includes architectural elements that later became known as components of the Colonial Revival style. Two stories tall with an attic in the gables, the house has single-story wings whose flat roofs are enclosed by railings.

In 1993, the Downing House was listed on the National Register of Historic Places, qualifying both because of its historically significant architecture and because of its place as the home of John Downing. The last Downing to live in the house died in the same year. Ten years later, after approximately five years of restoration, Downing's residence opened as a bed and breakfast, the Downing House Bed and Breakfast.
