= Columbus Buckeyes (Negro National League) =

1921 Negro league baseball team

Information
- League: Negro National League (I) (1921)
- Location: Columbus, Ohio
- Established: 1921
- Disbanded: 1921

The Columbus Buckeyes were a Negro league baseball team that played for a single season, 1921, in the Negro National League.

== Founding ==
Following the 1920 season, the Dayton Marcos' franchise slot was sold to two Columbus businessmen, Harry St. Clair and Dr. Howard Smith. They immediately moved the club to Columbus and renamed them the Buckeyes. Hall-of-Fame shortstop John Henry Lloyd was hired as playing manager of the Negro league team and Sol White, a manager, player and journalist in African-American baseball history, served as coach and general adviser to the team. A young Clint Thomas, who later became a successful outfielder, was the team's second baseman; fastballer Roy Roberts was the workhorse of the pitching staff.

== Demise ==
The team was not very successful, either on the field or at the box office, causing Lloyd to constantly adjust the lineup and seek new players. Eventually the club finished seventh out of eight teams with a 25-38 record. At season's end the Columbus Buckeyes were dissolved, and Lloyd moved east to manage the Bacharach Giants.
