= Dayton Marcos =

Information
- League: Independent (1909–1919, 1921, 1921–1926, 1927–1950 ); Negro National League (1920, 1926)
- Location: Dayton, Ohio
- Ballpark: Westwood Field (Dayton, OH); Ducks Park (Dayton, OH); Hudson Field (Dayton, OH)
- Founded: 1909
- Disbanded: 1950

The Dayton Marcos were a Negro league baseball team based from Dayton, Ohio that played during the early twentieth century.

== Founding and early years ==
The Dayton Marcos history predates the formal organized leagues of Negro league baseball. As an independent team, and also as the only black team in the Ohio-Indiana League they played black and white teams all over the country throughout the 1910s. Early newspaper accounts mention the team as early as 1909, billing them as "one of the strongest Dayton semi-professional teams."

The team was started by Daytonian Moses Moore, a real estate agent. Moore owned the New Marco Hotel and apparently named his team after that enterprise. The team was to be entertainment for Dahomey Park, the first black-owned and operated amusement park in the United States. They set up shop in West Side Park, later renamed Westwood Field and located 2 blocks west of Dahomey Park. Local newspapers sometimes referred to the team as "Moses Moore's Marcos."

=== The flood of 1913 ===
The region suffered a devastating flood in the spring of 1913. Marcos star pitcher Bill Sloan leapt to action, commandeering a boat and rescuing as many as 317 Dayton citizens. In 2013, an anonymous Good Samaritan donated a headstone memorializing Sloan's heroic act.

== Negro National League years ==
=== 1920 ===
The Marcos were founding members of the Negro National League when it was founded on February 13, 1920. They were managed by Candy Jim Taylor, who also played Third Base. With his managerial career spanning three decades, Taylor would go on to be the winningest manager in Negro League history, including winning two Negro League World Series with the Homestead Grays. The Marcos National Negro League home opener was on June 12, 1920 at Westwood Field (present day James H. McGee Blvd. and Rosedale), a 5-4 victory over the Chicago Giants. Local Koke Alexander led the team in hitting with a .350 batting average, while rookie George "Chippy" Britt was the Marcos' workhorse on the mound. Britt would play for 21 more seasons. The Marcos finished the 1920 campaign in seventh place with a 16-36 record, 23 games behind the pennant winning Chicago American Giants.

=== "Sale" and franchise split ===
The league's winter meetings kicked off on December 4 with owner John Matthews present as representative of the Marcos. Early accounts announced the sale of the Marcos to businessmen in Columbus, Ohio, where it was rechristened as the Columbus Buckeyes. However, a 1943 column in The Pittsburgh Courier written by Hall of Fame player, manager, and executive Cum Posey detailed the true story: "Mathews[sic] of the Dayton Marcos went to sleep in the league meeting. When he awoke "Rube" had taken his franchise and divided his players among the other clubs." While the press billed the move as a transfer and several former Marcos joined the Buckeyes, Matthews continued to operate the Marcos as an independent team. In April, the club hosted the Buckeyes in a 10-5 loss at Westwood Field.

=== 1926 ===
John Matthews, still owner of the Marcos, was present at NNL winter meetings and the Marcos were slated to rejoin the NNL in 1923. However, the team would not rejoin league play until 1926. The Marcos made agreements with local clubs to once again use Westwood Field with plans to renovate their old home including additional seating. Local star catcher Eddie Huff was signed as field manager. The 1926 Marcos were a revolving door of names and faces, with as many as 43 different men wearing a Dayton uniform in league play. In June the Marcos made headlines by grabbing former star shortstop Joe Hewitt from the St. Louis Stars, purchasing him outright along with 4 other players. Hewitt struggled in his new home, hitting .079 in league play. Hewitt was briefly backed up by 20 year old rookie shortstop Alex Radcliff, who would later garner 11 All-Star selections with the Chicago American Giants. On July 13, the Marcos travelled to Schorling Park in Chicago to face the American Giants. The day ended in the Marcos landing on the wrong side of a 13-0 no-hitter by Rube Currie in the second game of a doubleheader. Just six days later, the team withdrew from league play. The Marcos ended the year in last place with a 6-36 record.

== Independent ==
After leaving the NNL, the Marcos returned to independent play and participated in the integrated Indiana-Ohio League, winning the championship in 1932. Pitcher Ray Brown got his start with the team in 1930 before embarking on a career that led to the Hall of Fame.

== Final years ==
Long time owner Matthews died at home in Dayton in spring of 1942, and his Marcos were remembered as "the means of keeping semi pro ball alive" in Dayton. By 1943, the Marcos had rebranded at least twice as the independent Dayton Monarchs and Dayton Elks. By 1947, the Marcos name had returned and the team was a member of the minor Western American Association. Newspaper coverage of the Marcos fades after 1950, and in 1952 Westwood Field (then known as Sucher's Park) was sold for redevelopment.

== Legacy ==
In 2011, the entire Marcos franchise was honored with a permanently installed marker in the Dayton Walk of Fame, located in the historic Wright-Dunbar Business District in the city. From 2016-2019, Sinclair Community College honored the Negro Leagues by wearing replicas of Marcos and other jerseys for several games. On June 12, 2021, the City of Dayton celebrated "Dayton Marcos Day."

== Notable players ==
- Chippy Britt
- Ray Brown
- Joe Dewitt
- Dizzy Dismukes
- Alex Radcliffe
- Candy Jim Taylor

== See also ==
- Category:Dayton Marcos players
- 1920 Dayton Marcos season
