= List of Major League Baseball career batting average leaders =

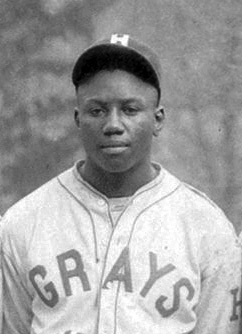
Josh Gibson has the highest career batting average (.371) in major-league history.

In baseball, the batting average (BA) is defined by the number of hits divided by at bats. It is usually reported to three decimal places and pronounced as if it were multiplied by 1,000: a player with a batting average of .300 is "batting three hundred." A point (or percentage point) is understood to be .001. If necessary to break ties, batting averages could be taken to more than three decimal places.

Catcher Josh Gibson, whose career ended in 1946, has the highest batting average in major-league history. (Note: The list presented includes players and statistics from defunct leagues considered "major" by Major League Baseball, not only the National League and American League. See Major League Baseball#Other recognized leagues.) He batted .371 over 14 seasons, mostly with the Homestead Grays. In addition, he also holds the single-season record for highest batting average in major league history at .466 in 1943. Gibson never recorded a batting average of under .316 in any qualifying season. Ty Cobb is second all-time with a career batting average of .367. He won a record 11 batting titles in the American League from 1907–1909, 1911–1915, and 1917–1919. Oscar Charleston is third with a career batting average of .363. Charleston and Gibson are the only players to have won consecutive Triple Crowns, having done so in 1924 and 1925 and 1936 and 1937, respectively.

== Career batting average leaders ==
Different sources of baseball records present somewhat differing lists of career batting average leaders. (Note: For example, Baseball Reference requires a player to have had at least 3,000 plate appearances in their major-league career to qualify, while Baseball Almanac requires 1,000 career games played and 1,000 career at bats; both exclude Josh Gibson, who had 2526 plate appearances in 602 games.) Until the incorporation of statistics from Negro league baseball into major-league records in 2024, Ty Cobb was the consensus leader; subsequently, he was supplanted by Josh Gibson. The below table presents the 100 players with the highest qualified batting averages for their major-league careers, as published on MLB.com. A player must have a minimum of 5,000 at bats to qualify for the list. (Note: The 5,000 at bat minimum used by MLB.com results in the omission of Shoeless Joe Jackson, who had 4,981 at bats during his major-league career.) For Negro League players, the minimum is set at 1,800 at bats, or 5,000 at bats combining their Negro league, National League, and American League statistics.

As of September 20, 2026, no active player appears in the list below; the active player ranking highest is Jose Altuve, 171st with a .300 career batting average.

=== Key ===
**Rank**	Rank among leaders in career batting average
**Player**	Name of the player
**BA**	Major-league career batting average
*	Denotes a player elected to the National Baseball Hall of Fame
**Bold**	Denotes an active player (Note: A player is considered inactive if he has announced his retirement or has not played professionally for a full season.)

=== List ===
Rank	Player	BA
1	Josh Gibson*	.371
2	Ty Cobb*	.367
3	Oscar Charleston*	.363
4	Rogers Hornsby*	.358
5	Jud Wilson*	.351
6	Turkey Stearnes*	.349
7	Ed Delahanty*	.346
8	Tris Speaker*	.345
9	Ted Williams*	.344
10	Billy Hamilton*	.344
11	Buck Leonard*	.344
12	Dan Brouthers*	.342
13	Babe Ruth*	.342
14	Harry Heilmann*	.342
15	Willie Keeler*	.341
16	Bill Terry*	.341
17	Lou Gehrig*	.340
18	George Sisler*	.340
19	Mule Suttles*	.340
20	Nap Lajoie*	.339
21	Jesse Burkett*	.338
22	Tony Gwynn*	.338
23	Bullet Rogan*	.337
24	Cristóbal Torriente*	.335
25	Ben Taylor*	.335

Rank	Player	BA
26	Al Simmons*	.334
27	Paul Waner*	.333
28	Fats Jenkins	.333
29	Eddie Collins*	.333
30	Dick Lundy	.332
31	Cap Anson*	.331
32	Stan Musial*	.331
33	Sam Thompson*	.331
34	Heinie Manush*	.330
34	Red Parnell	.330
36	Honus Wagner*	.329
37	Willie Wells*	.328
38	Wade Boggs*	.328
39	Rod Carew*	.328
40	Hugh Duffy*	.325
41	Biz Mackey*	.325
42	Jimmie Foxx*	.325
43	Cool Papa Bell*	.325
44	Earle Combs*	.325
45	Joe DiMaggio*	.325
46	Babe Herman	.324
47	Joe Medwick*	.324
48	Hurley McNair	.323
49	George Scales	.323
50	Edd Roush*	.323

Rank	Player	BA
51	Sam Rice*	.322
52	Chaney White	.322
53	Clarence Smith	.321
54	Kiki Cuyler*	.321
55	Charlie Gehringer*	.320
56	Chuck Klein*	.320
57	Pie Traynor*	.320
58	Mickey Cochrane*	.320
59	Kirby Puckett*	.318
60	Earl Averill*	.318
61	Vladimir Guerrero*	.318
62	Arky Vaughan*	.318
63	Roberto Clemente*	.317
64	Joe Kelley*	.317
65	Zack Wheat*	.317
66	George Van Haltren	.317
67	Roger Connor*	.317
68	Lloyd Waner*	.316
69	Todd Helton*	.316
70	George Carr	.316
71	Frankie Frisch*	.316
72	Goose Goslin*	.316
73	Hank Greenberg*	.313
74	Jackie Robinson*	.313
75	Jack Fournier	.313

Rank	Player	BA
76	Elmer Flick*	.313
77	Nomar Garciaparra	.313
78	Larry Walker*	.313
79	Bill Dickey*	.313
80	Manny Ramirez	.312
81	Johnny Mize*	.312
82	Joe Sewell*	.312
83	Fred Clarke*	.312
84	Edgar Martínez*	.312
85	Freddie Lindstrom*	.311
86	Bing Miller	.311
87	Baby Doll Jacobson	.311
88	Ichiro Suzuki*	.311
89	Ginger Beaumont	.311
90	Mike Tiernan	.311
91	Luke Appling*	.310
92	Bobby Veach	.310
93	Jim O'Rourke*	.310
94	Jim Bottomley*	.310
95	Derek Jeter*	.310
96	Sam Crawford*	.309
97	Bob Meusel	.309
98	Magglio Ordóñez*	.309
99	Jack Tobin	.309
100	Branch Russell	.308

=== Gallery ===
Players ranked 2nd through 9th per MLB.com
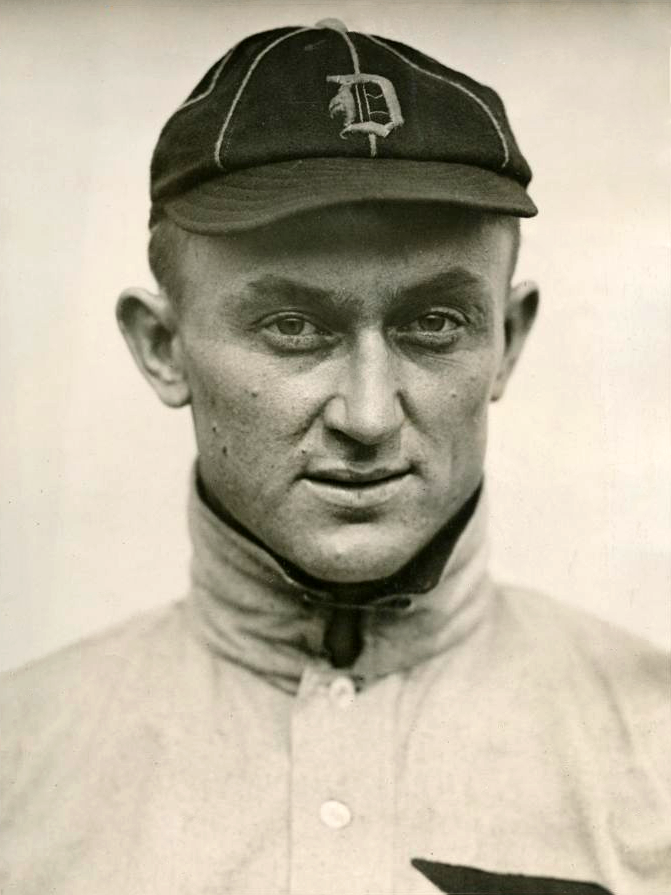
(2) Ty Cobb: .367

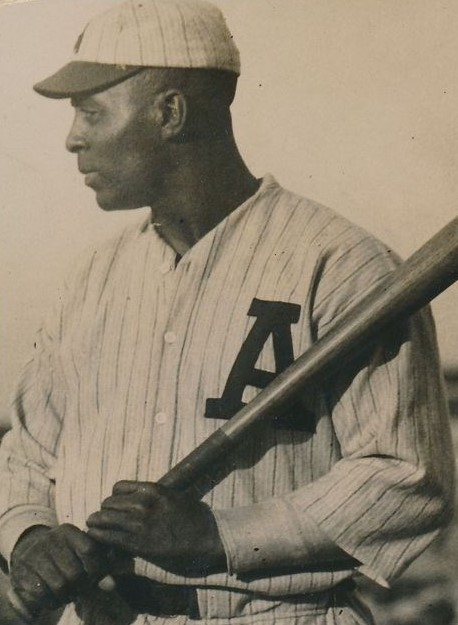
(3) Oscar Charleston: .363

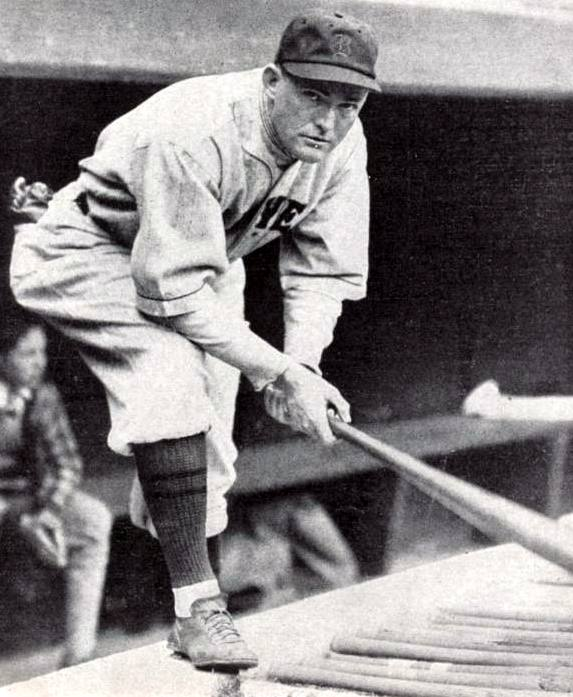
(4) Rogers Hornsby: .358

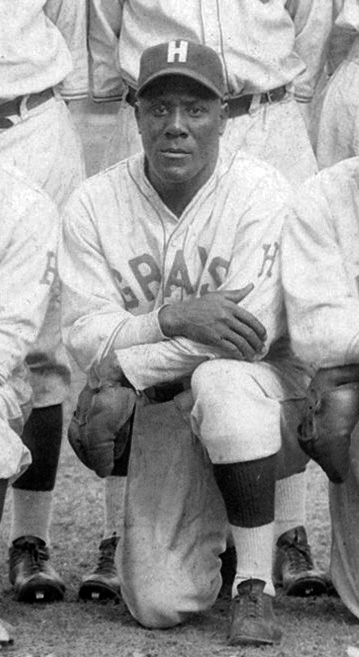
(5) Jud Wilson: .351

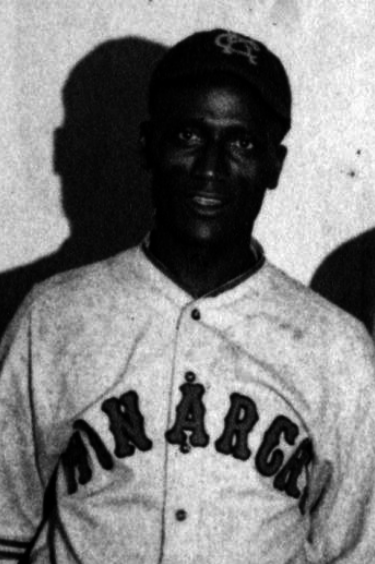
(6) Turkey Stearnes: .349

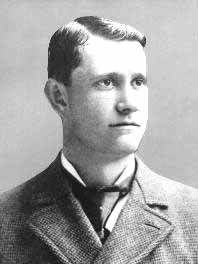
(7) Ed Delahanty: .346

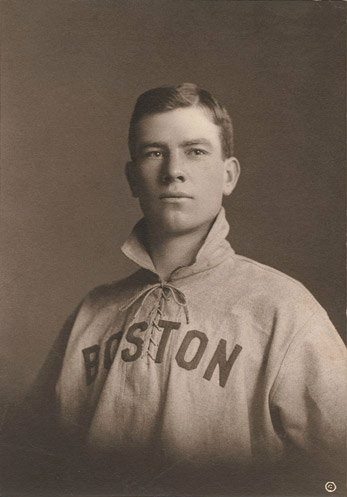
(8) Tris Speaker .345

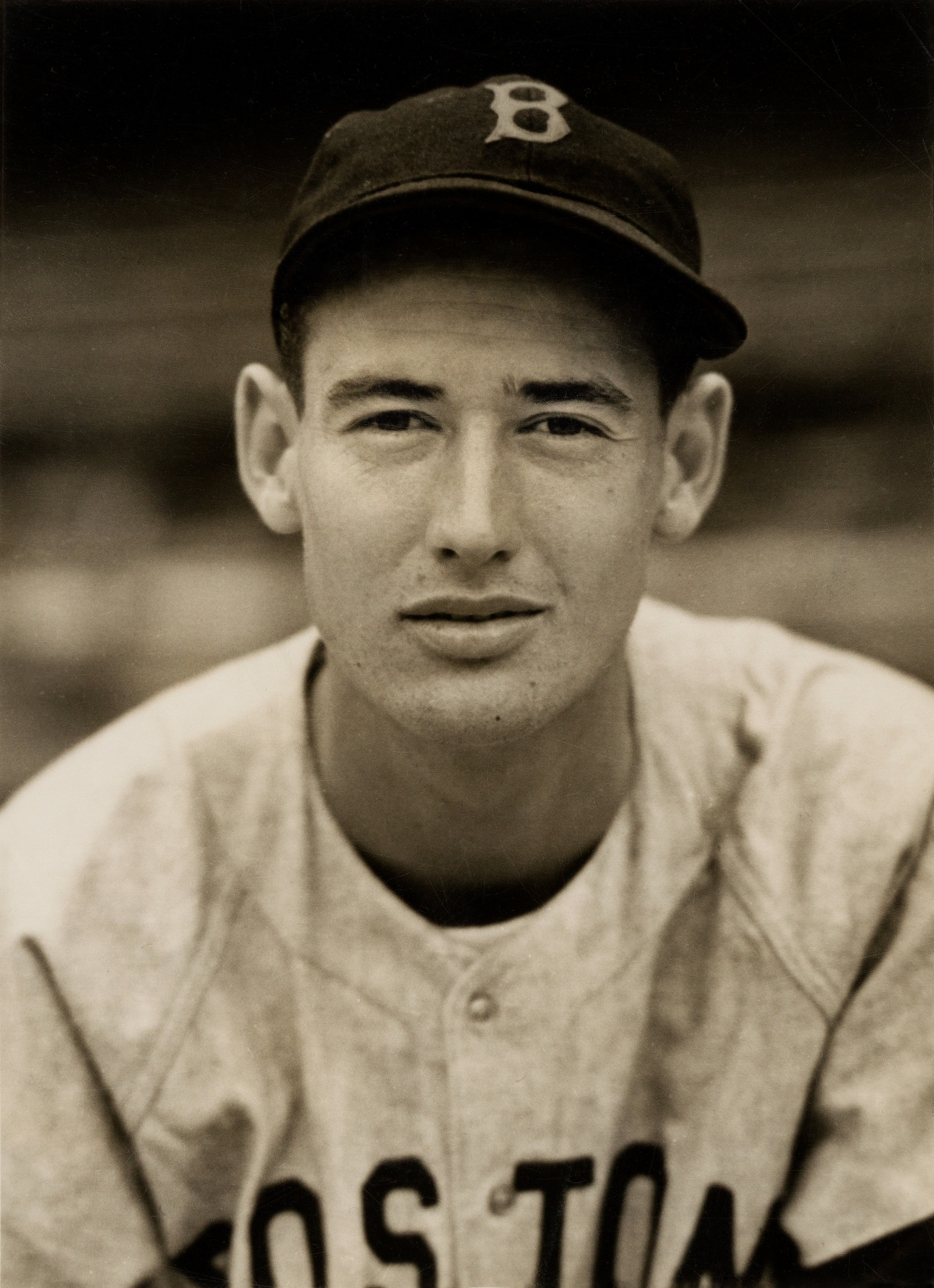
(9) Ted Williams .344

== Top ten rankings per different sources ==
Different sources of baseball records present somewhat differing lists of career batting average leaders, primarily due to differences in minimums needed to qualify (number of games played or plate appearances), or differences in early baseball records. Baseball Reference includes the Negro League teams considered major leagues by Major League Baseball, while such players do not appear in the lists presented by Baseball Almanac or ESPN. The criteria used by Baseball Reference—a minimum of 3,000 plate appearances—results in Josh Gibson being omitted. In sources where Gibson is omitted, Ty Cobb leads this category.

None of the players listed below are still living; each is an inductee of the Baseball Hall of Fame, except for Lefty O'Doul, Pete Browning, and Shoeless Joe Jackson (who was ineligible due to his alleged role in the Black Sox Scandal of 1919 until his eligibility was reinstated in 2025).

Baseball Reference			Baseball Almanac			ESPN			MLB.com		
Rank	Player	Average	Rank	Player	Average	Rank	Player	Average	Rank	Player	Average
1	Ty Cobb	.3662	1	Ty Cobb	.36636	1	Ty Cobb	.366	1	Josh Gibson	.371
2	Oscar Charleston	.3648	2	Rogers Hornsby	.35850	2	Rogers Hornsby	.358	2	Ty Cobb	.367
3	Rogers Hornsby	.3585	3	Shoeless Joe Jackson	.35575	3	Shoeless Joe Jackson	.356	3	Oscar Charleston	.363
4	Shoeless Joe Jackson	.3558	4	Ed Delahanty	.34590	4	Ed Delahanty	.346	4	Rogers Hornsby	.358
5	Jud Wilson	.3504	5	Tris Speaker	.34468	5	Tris Speaker	.345	5	Jud Wilson	.351
6	Lefty O'Doul	.3493	6	Ted Williams	.34441	6	Billy Hamilton	.344	6	Turkey Stearnes	.349
7	Turkey Stearnes	.3483	7	Billy Hamilton	.34429	6	Ted Williams	.344	7	Ed Delahanty	.346
8	Ed Delahanty	.3458	8	Babe Ruth	.34206	8	Dan Brouthers	.342	8	Buck Leonard	.345
9	Tris Speaker	.3447	9	Harry Heilmann	.34159	8	Harry Heilmann	.342	9	Ted Williams	.344
10	Billy Hamilton	.3444	10	Pete Browning	.34149	8	Babe Ruth	.342	9	Billy Hamilton	.344
10	Ted Williams	.3444							9	Buck Leonard	.344

== See also ==
- List of Major League Baseball players with a .400 batting average in a season
- List of Major League Baseball career on-base percentage leaders
- List of Major League Baseball career slugging percentage leaders
- List of Major League Baseball career OPS leaders
