= List of Major League Baseball annual triples leaders =

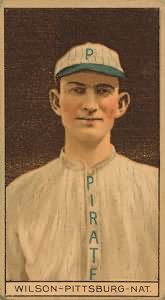
Chief Wilson of the Pittsburgh Pirates set the all-time record for triples in a season with 36 in 1912.

In baseball, a triple is recorded when the ball is hit so that the batter is able to advance all the way to third base, scoring any runners who were already on base, with no errors by the defensive team on the play. In Major League Baseball (MLB), a player in each league (Note: Recognized "major leagues" include the existing American and National Leagues and several defunct leagues – the American Association, the Federal League, the Players' League, and the Union Association.) is recognized for leading the league in triples. Only triples hit in a particular league count toward that league's seasonal lead.

The first triples champion in the National League was Ross Barnes; in the league's inaugural 1876 season, Barnes hit fourteen triples for the Chicago White Stockings. In 1901, the American League was established and led by two members of the Baltimore Orioles: Bill Keister and Jimmy Williams each had 21. Sam Crawford and Turkey Stearnes each led their respective leagues (the American League and Negro league baseball) six times, which is the most for any player.

== American League ==
Year	Leader	Team	Triples	Ref
1901	Bill Keister; Jimmy Williams	Baltimore Orioles	21	
1902	Jimmy Williams	Baltimore Orioles	21	
1903	Sam Crawford	Detroit Tigers	25	
1904	Joe Cassidy; Buck Freeman; Chick Stahl	Washington Senators; Boston Americans; Boston Americans	19	
1905	Elmer Flick	Cleveland Naps	18	
1906	Elmer Flick	Cleveland Naps	22	
1907	Elmer Flick	Cleveland Naps	18	
1908	Ty Cobb	Detroit Tigers	20	
1909	Frank Baker	Philadelphia Athletics	19	
1910	Sam Crawford	Detroit Tigers	19	
1911	Ty Cobb	Detroit Tigers	24	
1912	Joe Jackson	Cleveland Naps	26 (Note: American League single-season record (tied with Sam Crawford in 1914).)	
1913	Sam Crawford	Detroit Tigers	23	
1914	Sam Crawford	Detroit Tigers	26 (Note: American League single-season record (tied with Joe Jackson in 1912).)	
1915	Sam Crawford	Detroit Tigers	19	
1916	Joe Jackson	Chicago White Sox	21	
1917	Ty Cobb	Detroit Tigers	24	
1918	Ty Cobb	Detroit Tigers	14	
1919	Bobby Veach	Detroit Tigers	17	
1920	Joe Jackson	Chicago White Sox	20	
1921	Howie Shanks; George Sisler; Jack Tobin	Washington Senators; St. Louis Browns; St. Louis Browns	18	
1922	George Sisler	St. Louis Browns	18	
1923	Goose Goslin; Sam Rice	Washington Senators	18	
1924	Wally Pipp	New York Yankees	19	
1925	Goose Goslin	Washington Senators	20	
1926	Lou Gehrig	New York Yankees	20	
1927	Earle Combs	New York Yankees	23	
1928	Lou Gehrig	New York Yankees	21	
1929	Charlie Gehringer	Detroit Tigers	19	
1930	Earle Combs	New York Yankees	22	
1931	Roy Johnson	Detroit Tigers	19	
1932	Joe Cronin	Washington Senators	18	
1933	Heinie Manush	Washington Senators	17	
1934	Ben Chapman	New York Yankees	13	
1935	Joe Vosmik	Cleveland Indians	20	
1936	Earl Averill; Joe DiMaggio; Red Rolfe	Cleveland Indians; New York Yankees; New York Yankees	15	
1937	Mike Kreevich; Dixie Walker	Chicago White Sox	16	
1938	Jeff Heath	Cleveland Indians	18	
1939	Buddy Lewis	Washington Senators	16	
1940	Barney McCosky	Detroit Tigers	19	
1941	Jeff Heath	Cleveland Indians	20	
1942	Stan Spence	Washington Senators	15	
1943	Johnny Lindell; Wally Moses	New York Yankees; Chicago White Sox	12	
1944	Johnny Lindell; Snuffy Stirnweiss	New York Yankees	16	
1945	Snuffy Stirnweiss	New York Yankees	22	
1946	Hank Edwards	Cleveland Indians	16	
1947	Tommy Henrich	New York Yankees	13	
1948	Tommy Henrich	New York Yankees	14	
1949	Dale Mitchell	Cleveland Indians	23	
1950	Dom DiMaggio; Bobby Doerr; Hoot Evers	Boston Red Sox; Boston Red Sox; Detroit Tigers	11	
1951	Minnie Miñoso	Cleveland Indians; Chicago White Sox	14	
1952	Bobby Ávila	Cleveland Indians	11	
1953	Jim Rivera	Chicago White Sox	16	
1954	Minnie Miñoso	Chicago White Sox	18	
1955	Andy Carey; Mickey Mantle	New York Yankees; New York Yankees	11	
1956	Jackie Jensen; Jim Lemon; Minnie Miñoso; Harry Simpson	Boston Red Sox; Washington Senators; Chicago White Sox; Kansas City Athletics	11	
1957	Hank Bauer; Gil McDougald; Harry Simpson	New York Yankees; New York Yankees; Kansas City/New York	9	
1958	Vic Power	Kansas City Athletics; Cleveland Indians	10	
1959	Bob Allison	Washington Senators	9	
1960	Nellie Fox	Chicago White Sox	10	
1961	Jake Wood	Detroit Tigers	14	
1962	Gino Cimoli	Kansas City Athletics	15	
1963	Zoilo Versalles	Minnesota Twins	13	
1964	Rich Rollins; Zoilo Versalles	Minnesota Twins	10	
1965	Bert Campaneris; Zoilo Versalles	Kansas City Athletics; Minnesota Twins	12	
1966	Bobby Knoop	California Angels	11	
1967	Paul Blair	Baltimore Orioles	12	
1968	Jim Fregosi	California Angels	13	
1969	Del Unser	Washington Senators	8	
1970	César Tovar	Minnesota Twins	13	
1971	Freddie Patek	Kansas City Royals	11	
1972	Carlton Fisk; Joe Rudi	Boston Red Sox; Oakland Athletics	9	
1973	Al Bumbry; Rod Carew	Baltimore Orioles; Minnesota Twins	11	
1974	Mickey Rivers	California Angels	11	
1975	George Brett; Mickey Rivers	Kansas City Royals; California Angels	13	
1976	George Brett	Kansas City Royals	14	
1977	Rod Carew	Minnesota Twins	16	
1978	Jim Rice	Boston Red Sox	15	
1979	George Brett	Kansas City Royals	20	
1980	Alfredo Griffin; Willie Wilson	Toronto Blue Jays; Kansas City Royals	15	
1981	John Castino	Minnesota Twins	9	
1982	Willie Wilson	Kansas City Royals	15	
1983	Robin Yount	Milwaukee Brewers	10	
1984	Dave Collins; Lloyd Moseby	Toronto Blue Jays	15	
1985	Willie Wilson	Kansas City Royals	21	
1986	Brett Butler	Cleveland Indians	14	
1987	Willie Wilson	Kansas City Royals	15	
1988	Harold Reynolds; Willie Wilson; Robin Yount	Seattle Mariners; Kansas City Royals; Milwaukee Brewers	11	
1989	Rubén Sierra	Texas Rangers	14	
1990	Tony Fernández	Toronto Blue Jays	17	
1991	Lance Johnson; Paul Molitor	Chicago White Sox; Milwaukee Brewers	13	
1992	Lance Johnson	Chicago White Sox	12	
1993	Lance Johnson	Chicago White Sox	14	
1994	Lance Johnson	Chicago White Sox	14	
1995	Kenny Lofton	Cleveland Indians	13	
1996	Chuck Knoblauch	Minnesota Twins	14	
1997	Nomar Garciaparra	Boston Red Sox	11	
1998	José Offerman	Kansas City Royals	13	
1999	José Offerman	Boston Red Sox	11	
2000	Cristian Guzmán	Minnesota Twins	20	
2001	Cristian Guzmán	Minnesota Twins	14	
2002	Johnny Damon	Boston Red Sox	11	
2003	Cristian Guzmán	Minnesota Twins	14	
2004	Carl Crawford	Tampa Bay Devil Rays	19	
2005	Carl Crawford	Tampa Bay Devil Rays	15	
2006	Carl Crawford	Tampa Bay Devil Rays	16	
2007	Curtis Granderson	Detroit Tigers	23	
2008	Curtis Granderson	Detroit Tigers	13	
2009	Jacoby Ellsbury; Denard Span	Boston Red Sox; Minnesota Twins	10	
2010	Carl Crawford	Tampa Bay Rays	13	
2011	Austin Jackson; Peter Bourjos	Detroit Tigers; Los Angeles Angels of Anaheim	11	
2012	Austin Jackson	Detroit Tigers	10	
2013	Brett Gardner	New York Yankees	10	
2014	Adam Eaton	Chicago White Sox	10	
2015	Eddie Rosario	Minnesota Twins	15	
2016	Adam Eaton	Chicago White Sox	9	
2017	Nicholas Castellanos	Detroit Tigers	10	
2018	Yolmer Sánchez; Mallex Smith	Chicago White Sox; Tampa Bay Rays	10	
2019	Hunter Dozier; Whit Merrifield; Adalberto Mondesí	Kansas City Royals	10	
2020	Kyle Tucker	Houston Astros	6	
2021	Shohei Ohtani	Los Angeles Angels	8	
2022	Amed Rosario	Cleveland Guardians	9	
2023	Bobby Witt Jr.	Kansas City Royals	11	
2024	Jarren Duran	Boston Red Sox	14	
2025	Jarren Duran	Boston Red Sox	13	
2026	Kody Clemens	Minnesota Twins	7	

== National League ==
Year	Leader	Team	Triples	Ref
1876	Ross Barnes	Chicago White Stockings	14	
1877	Deacon White	Boston Red Caps	11	
1878	Tom York	Providence Grays	10	
1879	Buttercup Dickerson	Cincinnati Reds	14	
1880	Harry Stovey	Worcester Ruby Legs	14	
1881	Jack Rowe	Buffalo Bisons	11	
1882	Roger Connor	Troy Trojans	18	
1883	Dan Brouthers	Buffalo Bisons	17	
1884	Buck Ewing	New York Giants	20	
1885	Jim O'Rourke	New York Giants	16	
1886	Roger Connor	New York Giants	20	
1887	Sam Thompson	Detroit Wolverines	23	
1888	Dick Johnston	Boston Beaneaters	18	
1889	Walt Wilmot	Washington Nationals	19	
1890	John Reilly	Cincinnati Reds	26	
1891	Harry Stovey	Boston Beaneaters	20	
1892	Ed Delahanty	Philadelphia Phillies	21	
1893	Perry Werden	St. Louis Browns	29	
1894	Heinie Reitz	Baltimore Orioles	31	
1895	Kip Selbach	Washington Senators	22	
1896	Tom McCreery; George Van Haltren	Louisville Colonels; New York Giants	21	
1897	Harry Davis	Pittsburgh Pirates	28	
1898	John Anderson	Brooklyn Bridegrooms; Washington Senators	22	
1899	Jimmy Williams	Pittsburgh Pirates	28	
1900	Honus Wagner	Pittsburgh Pirates	22	
1901	Jimmy Sheckard	Brooklyn Superbas	19	
1902	Sam Crawford; Tommy Leach	Cincinnati Reds; Pittsburgh Pirates	22	
1903	Honus Wagner	Pittsburgh Pirates	19	
1904	Harry Lumley	Brooklyn Superbas	18	
1905	Cy Seymour	Cincinnati Reds	21	
1906	Fred Clarke; Frank Schulte	Pittsburgh Pirates; Chicago Cubs	13	
1907	Whitey Alperman; John Ganzel	Brooklyn Superbas; Cincinnati Reds	16	
1908	Honus Wagner	Pittsburgh Pirates	19	
1909	Mike Mitchell	Cincinnati Reds	17	
1910	Mike Mitchell	Cincinnati Reds	18	
1911	Larry Doyle	New York Giants	25	
1912	Chief Wilson	Pittsburgh Pirates	36 (Note: MLB and National League single-season record.)	
1913	Vic Saier	Chicago Cubs	21	
1914	Max Carey	Pittsburgh Pirates	17	
1915	Tom Long	St. Louis Cardinals	25	
1916	Bill Hinchman	Pittsburgh Pirates	16	
1917	Rogers Hornsby	St. Louis Cardinals	17	
1918	Jake Daubert	Brooklyn Robins	15	
1919	Hy Myers; Billy Southworth	Brooklyn Robins; Pittsburgh Pirates	14	
1920	Hy Myers	Brooklyn Robins	22	
1921	Rogers Hornsby; Ray Powell	St. Louis Cardinals; Boston Braves	18	
1922	Jake Daubert	Cincinnati Reds	22	
1923	Max Carey; Pie Traynor	Pittsburgh Pirates	19	
1924	Edd Roush	Cincinnati Reds	21	
1925	Kiki Cuyler	Pittsburgh Pirates	26	
1926	Paul Waner	Pittsburgh Pirates	22	
1927	Paul Waner	Pittsburgh Pirates	18	
1928	Jim Bottomley	St. Louis Cardinals	20	
1929	Lloyd Waner	Pittsburgh Pirates	20	
1930	Adam Comorosky	Pittsburgh Pirates	23	
1931	Bill Terry	New York Giants	20	
1932	Babe Herman	Cincinnati Reds	19	
1933	Arky Vaughan	Pittsburgh Pirates	19	
1934	Joe Medwick	St. Louis Cardinals	18	
1935	Ival Goodman	Cincinnati Reds	18	
1936	Ival Goodman	Cincinnati Reds	14	
1937	Arky Vaughan	Pittsburgh Pirates	17	
1938	Johnny Mize	St. Louis Cardinals	16	
1939	Billy Herman	Chicago Cubs	18	
1940	Arky Vaughan	Pittsburgh Pirates	15	
1941	Pete Reiser	Brooklyn Dodgers	17	
1942	Enos Slaughter	St. Louis Cardinals	17	
1943	Stan Musial	St. Louis Cardinals	20	
1944	Johnny Barrett	Pittsburgh Pirates	19	
1945	Luis Olmo	Brooklyn Dodgers	13	
1946	Stan Musial	St. Louis Cardinals	20	
1947	Harry Walker	St. Louis Cardinals; Philadelphia Phillies	16	
1948	Stan Musial	St. Louis Cardinals	18	
1949	Stan Musial; Enos Slaughter	St. Louis Cardinals	13	
1950	Richie Ashburn	Philadelphia Phillies	14	
1951	Gus Bell; Stan Musial	Pittsburgh Pirates; St. Louis Cardinals	12	
1952	Bobby Thomson	New York Giants	14	
1953	Jim Gilliam	Brooklyn Dodgers	17	
1954	Willie Mays	New York Giants	13	
1955	Dale Long; Willie Mays	Pittsburgh Pirates; New York Giants	13	
1956	Bill Bruton	Milwaukee Braves	15	
1957	Willie Mays	New York Giants	20	
1958	Richie Ashburn	Philadelphia Phillies	13	
1959	Wally Moon; Charlie Neal	Los Angeles Dodgers	11	
1960	Bill Bruton	Milwaukee Braves	13	
1961	George Altman	Chicago Cubs	12	
1962	Johnny Callison; Willie Davis; Bill Virdon; Maury Wills	Philadelphia Phillies; Los Angeles Dodgers; Pittsburgh Pirates; Los Angeles Dodgers	10	
1963	Vada Pinson	Cincinnati Reds	14	
1964	Dick Allen; Ron Santo	Philadelphia Phillies; Chicago Cubs	13	
1965	Johnny Callison	Philadelphia Phillies	16	
1966	Tim McCarver	St. Louis Cardinals	13	
1967	Vada Pinson	Cincinnati Reds	13	
1968	Lou Brock	St. Louis Cardinals	14	
1969	Roberto Clemente	Pittsburgh Pirates	12	
1970	Willie Davis	Los Angeles Dodgers	16	
1971	Roger Metzger; Joe Morgan	Houston Astros	11	
1972	Larry Bowa	Philadelphia Phillies	13	
1973	Roger Metzger	Houston Astros	14	
1974	Ralph Garr	Atlanta Braves	17	
1975	Ralph Garr	Atlanta Braves	11	
1976	Dave Cash	Philadelphia Phillies	12	
1977	Garry Templeton	St. Louis Cardinals	18	
1978	Garry Templeton	St. Louis Cardinals	13	
1979	Garry Templeton	St. Louis Cardinals	19	
1980	Omar Moreno; Rodney Scott	Pittsburgh Pirates; Montreal Expos	13	
1981	Craig Reynolds; Gene Richards	Houston Astros; San Diego Padres	12	
1982	Dickie Thon	Houston Astros	10	
1983	Brett Butler	Atlanta Braves	13	
1984	Juan Samuel; Ryne Sandberg	Philadelphia Phillies; Chicago Cubs	19	
1985	Willie McGee	St. Louis Cardinals	18	
1986	Mitch Webster	Montreal Expos	13	
1987	Juan Samuel	Philadelphia Phillies	15	
1988	Andy Van Slyke	Pittsburgh Pirates	15	
1989	Robby Thompson	San Francisco Giants	11	
1990	Mariano Duncan	Cincinnati Reds	11	
1991	Ray Lankford	St. Louis Cardinals	15	
1992	Deion Sanders	Atlanta Braves	14	
1993	Steve Finley	Houston Astros	13	
1994	Brett Butler; Darren Lewis	Los Angeles Dodgers; San Francisco Giants	9	
1995	Brett Butler; Eric Young	New York/Los Angeles; Colorado Rockies	9	
1996	Lance Johnson	New York Mets	21	
1997	Delino DeShields	St. Louis Cardinals	14	
1998	David Dellucci	Arizona Diamondbacks	12	
1999	Bobby Abreu; Neifi Pérez	Philadelphia Phillies; Colorado Rockies	11	
2000	Tony Womack	Arizona Diamondbacks	14	
2001	Jimmy Rollins	Philadelphia Phillies	12	
2002	Jimmy Rollins	Philadelphia Phillies	10	
2003	Steve Finley; Rafael Furcal	Arizona Diamondbacks; Atlanta Braves	10	
2004	Juan Pierre; Jimmy Rollins; Jack Wilson	Florida Marlins; Philadelphia Phillies; Pittsburgh Pirates	12	
2005	José Reyes	New York Mets	17	
2006	José Reyes	New York Mets	17	
2007	Jimmy Rollins	Philadelphia Phillies	20	
2008	José Reyes	New York Mets	19	
2009	Shane Victorino	Philadelphia Phillies	13	
2010	Dexter Fowler	Colorado Rockies	14	
2011	José Reyes; Shane Victorino	New York Mets; Philadelphia Phillies	16	
2012	Ángel Pagán	San Francisco Giants	15	
2013	Denard Span	Washington Nationals	11	
2014	Dee Gordon	Los Angeles Dodgers	12	
2015	David Peralta	Arizona Diamondbacks	10	
2016	Brandon Crawford; César Hernández; Chris Owings	San Francisco Giants; Philadelphia Phillies; Arizona Diamondbacks	11	
2017	Charlie Blackmon	Colorado Rockies	14	
2018	Ketel Marte	Arizona Diamondbacks	12	
2019	Eduardo Escobar	Arizona Diamondbacks	10	
2020	Trevor Story; Trea Turner; Mike Yastrzemski	Colorado Rockies; Washington Nationals; San Francisco Giants	4	
2021	David Peralta; Bryan Reynolds	Arizona Diamondbacks; Pittsburgh Pirates	8	
2022	Gavin Lux; Brandon Nimmo	Los Angeles Dodgers; New York Mets	7	
2023	Corbin Carroll	Arizona Diamondbacks	10	
2024	Corbin Carroll	Arizona Diamondbacks	14	
2025	Corbin Carroll	Arizona Diamondbacks	17	
2026	Corbin Carroll	Arizona Diamondbacks	17	

== Other major leagues ==
=== American Association ===
Year	Player	Team(s)	Triples
1882	Mike Mansell	Pittsburgh Alleghenys	16
1883	Pop Smith	Columbus Buckeyes	17
1884	Harry Stovey	Philadelphia Athletics	23
1885	Dave Orr	New York Metropolitans	21
1886	Dave Orr	New York Metropolitans	31 (Note: American Association single-season record.)
1887	Oyster Burns; Jumbo Davis; John Kerins; Bid McPhee; Tip O'Neill; Tom Poorman	Baltimore Orioles; Baltimore Orioles; Louisville Colonels; Cincinnati Red Stockings; St. Louis Browns; Philadelphia Athletics	19
1888	Harry Stovey	Philadelphia Athletics	20
1889	Lefty Marr	Columbus Solons	15
1890	Perry Werden	Toledo Maumees	20
1891	Tom Brown	Boston Reds	21

=== National Association of Professional Base Ball Players ===
Year	Player	Team(s)	Triples	Ref
1871	John Bass	Cleveland Forest Citys	10	
1872	Charlie Gould	Boston Red Stockings	8	
1873	Ross Barnes	Boston Red Stockings	11	
1874	George Wright	Boston Red Stockings	15 (Note: National Association of Professional Base Ball Players single-season record.)	
1875	Bill Craver	Philadelphia Athletics / Philadelphia Centennials	13	

=== Federal League ===
Year	Player	Team(s)	Triples
1914	Jimmy Esmond; Steve Evans	Indianapolis Hoosiers; Brooklyn Tip-Tops	15
1915	Les Mann	Chicago Whales	19

=== Player's League ===
Year	Player	Team(s)	Triples
1890	Jake Beckley; Joe Visner	Pittsburgh Burghers	22

=== Union Association ===
Year	Player	Team(s)	Triples
1884	Dick Burns	Cincinnati Outlaw Reds	12

== Negro Major Leagues ==
=== Negro National League I ===
Year	Leader	Triples	Team	Runner-up	Triples	Ref
1920	Oscar Charleston	11	Indianapolis ABCs	Cristóbal Torriente	9	
1921	Clint Thomas	18	Columbus Buckeyes	Cristóbal Torriente	13	
1922	Oscar Charleston	18	Indianapolis ABCs	Biz Mackey	17	
1923	Turkey Stearnes	14	Detroit Stars	Heavy Johnson	13	
1924	Turkey Stearnes, Bill Pierce	12	Detroit Stars	Dobie Moore	11	
1925	Turkey Stearnes	14	Detroit Stars	Hurley McNair	13	
1926	Mule Suttles	19 (Note: Negro Major League single-season record.)	St. Louis Stars	Branch Russell	28	
1927	Dewey Creacy, Turkey Stearnes	12	St. Louis Stars (Creacy), Detroit Stars (Stearnes)	Wilson Redus, Red Parnell	10	
1928	Babe Melton	13	Cleveland Tigers	Mule Suttles, Branch Russell	12	
1929	L. D. Livingston	12	Kansas City Monarchs	Pythias Russ	11	
1930	Wade Johnston	10	Detroit Stars	Jimmie Crutchfield, Crush Holloway, Ed Rile, Chester Williams	9	
1931	Jimmy Binder, Jimmie Crutchfield, Jim Williams, Lou Dials, Mule Suttles	4	Indianapolis ABCs (Binder, Crutchfield, and Williams), Detroit Stars (Dials), St. Louis Stars (Suttles)	Jabbo Andrews, George Mitchell, Newt Allen, Willie Wells	3	

=== Eastern Colored League ===
Year	Leader	Triples	Team	Runner-up	Triples	Ref
1923	Cleo Smith	6	Baltimore Black Sox	Bennie Wilson, Robert Hudspeth, George Johnson, Ed Poles	5	
1924	Dick Jackson	8	Harrisburg Giants	Clint Thomas, Wade Johnston	7	
1925	George Carr	11	Hilldale Club	Judy Johnson	8	
1926	Clint Thomas	8	Hilldale Club	Judy Johnson	6	
1927	Otto Briggs	9	Hilldale Club	Walter Cannady, Clarence Smith	8	
1928	Chaney White, Rap Dixon	7	Atlantic City Bacharach Giants (White), Baltimore Black Sox (Dixon)	Crush Holloway	4	

=== American Negro League ===
Year	Leader	Triples	Team	Runner-up	Triples	Ref
1929	Chaney White	10	Atlantic City Bacharach Giants / Hilldale Club	Oscar Charleston, Rap Dixon	7	

=== East–West League ===
Year	Leader	Triples	Team	Runner-up	Triples	Ref
1932	Buddy Burbage, Bert Johnson	6	Baltimore Black Sox (Burbage), Washington Pilots (Johnson)	Dewey Creacy, Vic Harris, Eppie Hamilton	5	

=== Negro Southern League ===
Year	Leader	Triples	Team	Runner-up	Triples	Ref
1932	Red Parnell	11	Monroe Monarchs	Leroy Morney	7	

=== Negro National League II ===
Year	Leader	Triples	Team	Runner-up	Triples	Ref
1933	Josh Gibson, Oscar Charleston	7	Pittsburgh Crawfords	Chester Williams, Turkey Stearnes, John Henry Russell, Steel Arm Davis	5	
1934	Jake Dunn,,Turkey Stearnes	7	Philadelphia Stars (Dunn), Chicago American Giants (Stearnes)	Buddy Burbage, Chester Williams	5	
1935	Matt Carlisle	11	Homestead Grays	Sam Bankhead	8	
1936	Jerry Benjamin, Bill Wright, Sammy Hughes, Ed Stone, Johnny Washington, Turkey Stearnes, Clyde Spearman	5	Homestead Grays (Benjamin), Washington Elite Giants (Wright and Hughes), Newark Eagles / Pittsburgh Crawfords (Stone), Pittsburgh Crawfords (Washington), Philadelphia Stars (Stearnes), New York Cubans (Spearman)	Jud Wilson, Buck Leonard, Josh Gibson, Sam Bankhead, Fats Jenkins	4	
1937	Bill Wright	11	Washington Elite Giants	Josh Gibson	7	
1938	Chester Williams, Clyde Spearman, Buck Leonard, Vic Harris, Jerry Benjamin	5	Pittsburgh Crawfords (Williams), Philadelphia Stars (Spearman), Homestead Grays (Leonard, Harris and Benjamin)	Sammy Hughes, Harry Williams, Red Parnell, Gene Benson, Josh Gibson	4	
1939	Pat Patterson, Jelly Jackson, Henry Spearman	4	Philadelphia Stars (Patterson), Homestead Grays (Jackson and Spearman)	Josh Gibson, Vic Harris, Chester Williams, David Whatley	3	
1940	Howard Easterling	9	Homestead Grays	Larnie Jordan, Vic Harris, Matt Carlisle	6	
1941	Buck Leonard, Bill Hoskins, Johnny Washington	7	Homestead Grays (Leonard), Baltimore Elite Giants / New York Black Yankees (Hoskins), Baltimore Elite Giants (Washington)	Tetelo Vargas	6	
1942	Felton Snow	7	Baltimore Elite Giants	Bill Hoskins	6	
1943	Howard Easterling	10	Homestead Grays	Josh Gibson	9	
1944	Buck Leonard	7	Homestead Grays	Ed Stone, Josh Gibson	6	
1945	Henry Kimbro	9	Baltimore Elite Giants	Bill Hoskins	7	
1946	Larry Doby	10	Newark Eagles	Henry Kimbro, Pee Wee Butts	7	
1947	Butch Davis	12	Baltimore Elite Giants	Pee Wee Butts	7	
1948	Minnie Miñoso, Bill Cash	6	New York Cubans (Miñoso), Philadelphia Stars (Cash)	Jimmy Wilkes, Cleveland Clark, Frank Russell	5	

=== Negro American League ===
Year	Leader	Doubles	Team	Runner-up	Doubles	Ref
1937	Willard Brown	10	Kansas City Monarchs	Henry Turner	9	
1938	Henry Milton	6	Kansas City Monarchs	Babe Davis,	10	
1939	Willard Brown	7	Kansas City Monarchs	Alex Radcliff, Roosevelt Cox, Babe Davis	5	
1940	Marlin Carter, Joe Greene	4	Memphis Red Sox (Carter), Kansas City Monarchs (Greene)	Jesse Williams, Parnell Woods, Junius Bibbs, Marshall Riddle, Buck O'Neil, Tommy Sampson, Ted Bond	3	
