= List of Major League Baseball career on-base percentage leaders =

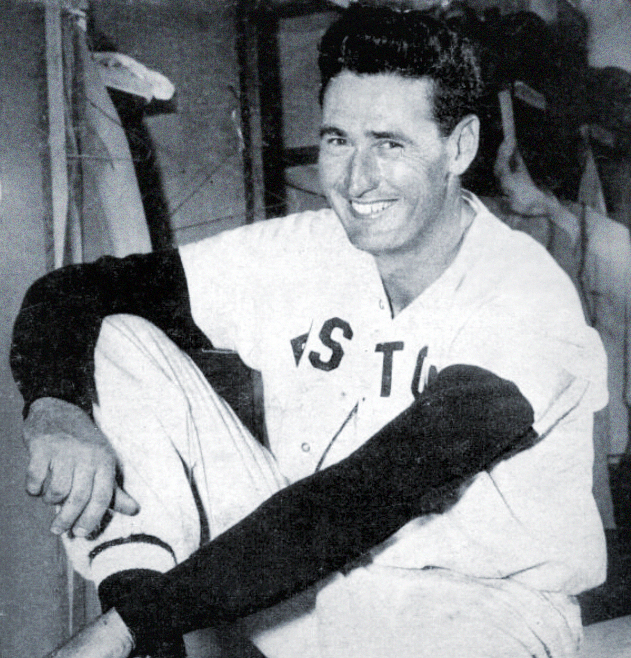
Ted Williams has the highest career on-base percentage in MLB history, led the American League in 12 seasons (also a record), and held the single-season on-base percentage record for 61 years.

In baseball statistics, on-base percentage (OBP) is a measure of how often a batter reaches base for any reason other than a fielding error, fielder's choice, dropped or uncaught third strike, fielder's obstruction, or catcher's interference. OBP is calculated in Major League Baseball (MLB) by dividing the sum of hits, walks, and times hit by a pitch by the sum of at-bats, walks, times hit by pitch and sacrifice flies. A hitter with a .400 on-base percentage is considered to be great and rare; only 61 players in MLB history with at least 3,000 career plate appearances (PA) have maintained such an OBP. Left fielder Ted Williams, who played 19 seasons for the Boston Red Sox, has the highest career on-base percentage, .4817, in MLB history. Williams led the American League (AL) in on-base percentage in twelve seasons, the most such seasons for any player in the major leagues. Barry Bonds led the National League (NL) in ten seasons, a NL record. Williams also posted the then-highest single-season on-base percentage of .5528 in 1941, a record that stood for 61 years until Bonds broke it with a .5817 OBP in 2002. Bonds broke his own record in 2004, setting the current single-season mark of .6094.

Players are eligible for the Hall of Fame if they have played at least 10 major league seasons, have been either retired for five seasons or deceased for six months, and have not been banned from MLB. These requirements leave 6 living players ineligible who have played in the past 5 seasons and 5 players (Bill Joyce, Ferris Fain, Jake Stenzel, Bill Lange, and George Selkirk) who did not play 10 seasons in MLB.

== Key ==
Rank	Rank amongst leaders in career on-base percentage. A blank field indicates a tie.
Player	Name of the player.
OBP	Total career on-base percentage.
*	Denotes elected to National Baseball Hall of Fame.
**Bold**	Denotes active player. (Note: A player is considered inactive if he has announced his retirement or not played for a full season.)

== List ==
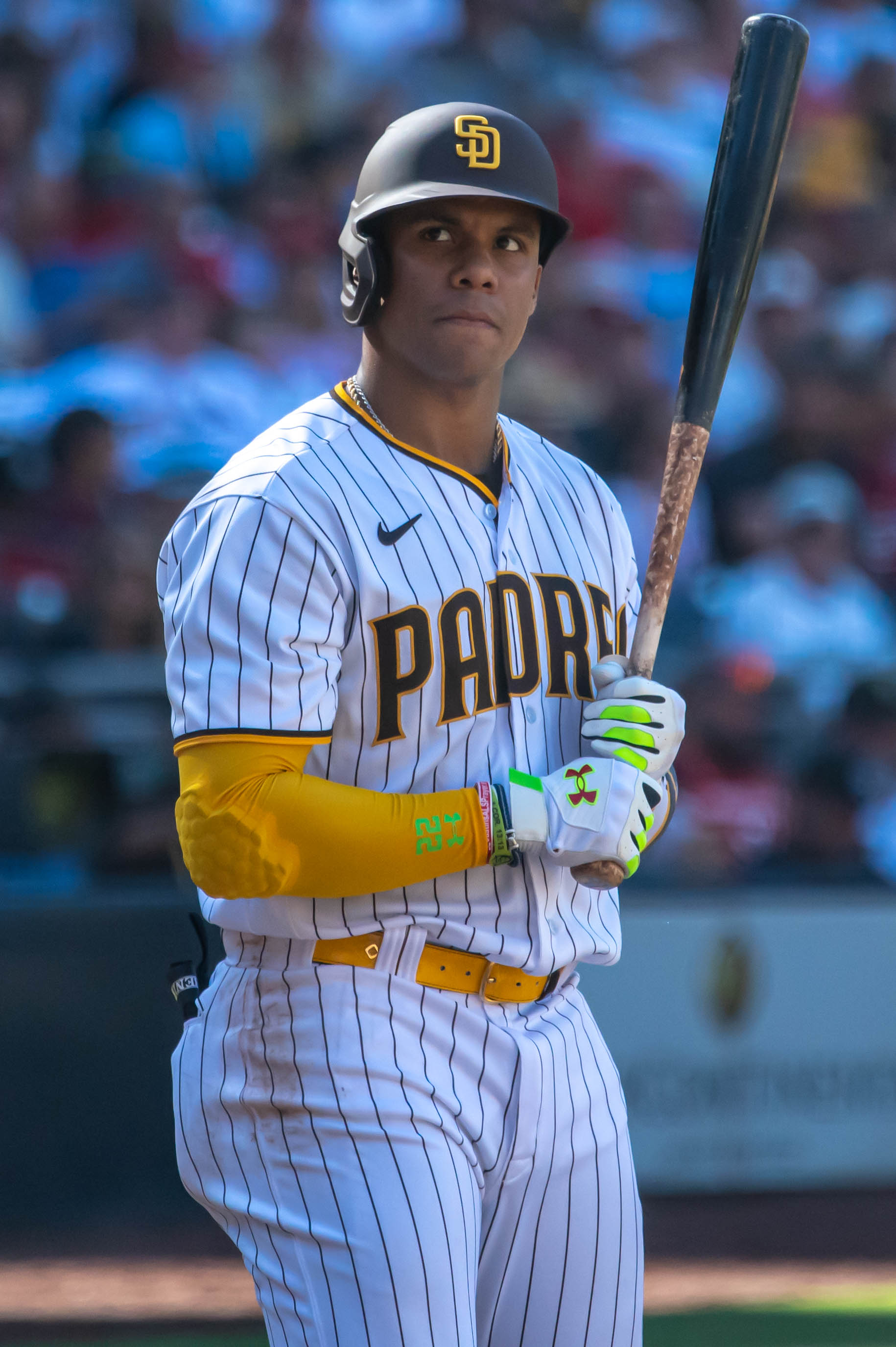
Juan Soto, the active leader and tied for 27th all-time in career on-base percentage.

- Stats updated as of September 27, 2026.

Rank	Player	OBP
1	Ted Williams*	.4817
2	Babe Ruth*	.4739
3	John McGraw*	.4657
4	Billy Hamilton*	.4552
5	Oscar Charleston*	.4487
6	Lou Gehrig*	.4474
7	Barry Bonds	.4443
8	Jud Wilson*	.4351
9	Bill Joyce	.4349
10	Rogers Hornsby*	.4337
11	Ty Cobb*	.4330
12	Jimmie Foxx*	.4283
13	Tris Speaker*	.4279
14	Eddie Collins*	.4244
15	Ferris Fain	.4241
16	Dan Brouthers*	.4234
17	Max Bishop	.4230
18	Shoeless Joe Jackson	.4227
19	Mickey Mantle*	.4205
20	Mickey Cochrane*	.4192
21	Frank Thomas*	.4191
22	Edgar Martínez*	.4178
23	Turkey Stearnes*	.4168
24	Stan Musial*	.4167
25	Cupid Childs	.4157
26	Wade Boggs*	.4150
27	Jesse Burkett*	.4149
	**Juan Soto**	.4149
29	Todd Helton*	.4140
	Mel Ott*	.4140
31	Roy Thomas	.4135
32	Lefty O'Doul	.4133
33	Hank Greenberg*	.4118
34	Ed Delahanty*	.4113
35	Manny Ramirez	.4106
36	**Aaron Judge**	.4100
37	Charlie Keller	.4099
	Jackie Robinson*	.4099
39	Eddie Stanky	.4098
	Mule Suttles*	.4098
41	Harry Heilmann*	.4095
42	Joey Votto	.4094
43	Roy Cullenbine	.4082
44	Jake Stenzel	.4078
45	Jeff Bagwell*	.4076
46	Denny Lyons	.4074
	Willie Wells*	.4074
48	Riggs Stephenson	.4065
49	Lance Berkman	.4060
50	Arky Vaughan*	.4058

Rank	Player	OBP
51	**Mike Trout**	.4045
52	Joe Harris	.4044
53	Paul Waner*	.4043
54	Charlie Gehringer*	.4036
55	Joe Cunningham	.4035
56	Pete Browning	.4028
57	Lu Blue	.4022
58	Jim Thome*	.4019
59	Joe Kelley*	.4017
60	Rickey Henderson*	.4012
61	Chipper Jones*	.4011
62	Larry Walker*	.4002
63	Bill Lange	.4001
64	Brian Giles	.3998
	George Selkirk	.3998
66	Luke Appling*	.3994
67	Jason Giambi	.3993
68	Nick Johnson	.3989
69	Ross Youngs*	.3985
70	Joe DiMaggio*	.3983
	Elmer Valo	.3983
72	Ralph Kiner*	.3980
	John Olerud	.3980
	Mike Smith	.3977
75	Ed Morgan	.3975
76	Johnny Mize*	.3971
77	**Yordan Alvarez**	.3970
78	Earle Combs*	.3969
	Roger Connor*	.3969
80	John Kruk	.3966
	Hurley McNair	.3966
82	Richie Ashburn*	.3964
83	Cool Papa Bell*	.3961
84	Mike Hargrove	.3958
85	Branch Russell	.3955
86	Hack Wilson*	.3951
87	Bobby Abreu	.3950
88	Earl Averill*	.3947
89	Johnny Pesky	.3943
90	Mark McGwire	.3941
91	Cap Anson*	.3940
	Frank Chance*	.3940
	Stan Hack	.3940
	Eddie Yost	.3940
95	Ken Williams	.3933
96	Wally Schang	.3931
97	Rod Carew*	.3930
	Gary Sheffield	.3930
99	Bob Johnson	.3928
100	Bill Terry*	.3927

== See also ==
- List of Major League Baseball career batting average leaders
- List of Major League Baseball career slugging percentage leaders
- List of Major League Baseball career OPS leaders
