= List of Major League Baseball career OPS leaders =

Baseball sabermetric statistic

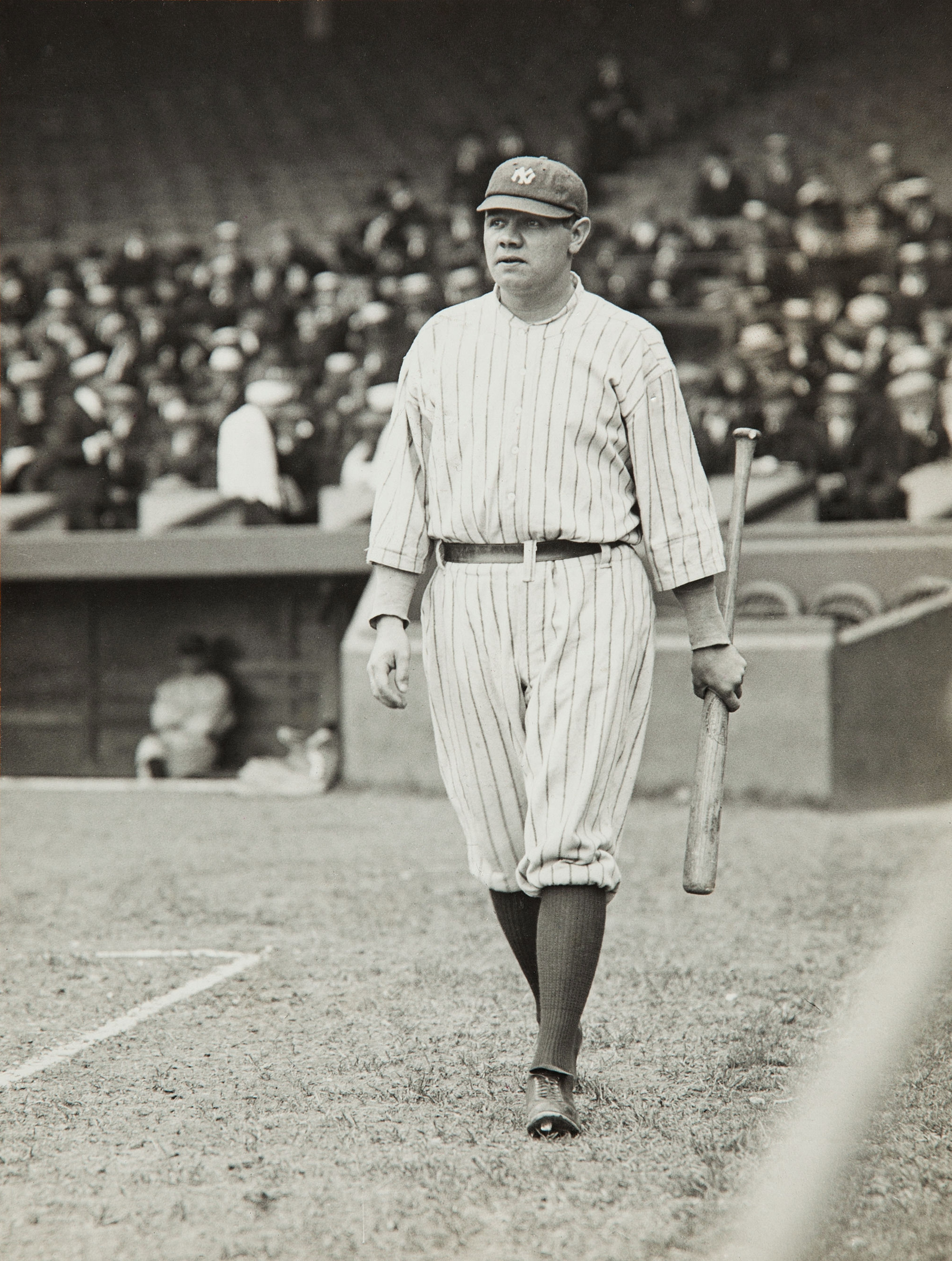
Babe Ruth, the all-time leader in OPS.

On-base plus slugging (OPS) is a sabermetric baseball statistic calculated as the sum of a player's on-base percentage and slugging average. The statistic reflects two important offensive skills: the ability of a player to get on base and to hit for power.

Babe Ruth is the all-time leader with a career 1.1636 OPS. Ted Williams (1.1155), Lou Gehrig (1.0798), Oscar Charleston (1.0632), Barry Bonds (1.0512), Jimmie Foxx (1.0376), Turkey Stearnes (1.0340), Mule Suttles (1.0176), Hank Greenberg (1.0169), and Rogers Hornsby (1.0103) are the only other players with a career OPS over 1.000.

== Key ==
**Rank**	Among leaders in career OPS. A blank field indicates a tie.
**Player**	Name of the player.
**OPS**	Career OPS.
*	Denotes elected to National Baseball Hall of Fame.
**Bold**	Active player. (Note: A player is considered inactive if he has announced his retirement or not played for a full season.)

== List ==
The top 100 Major League Baseball players in career OPS with at least 3,000 career plate appearances, as of September 27, 2026, are below. Names highlighted in green are active.

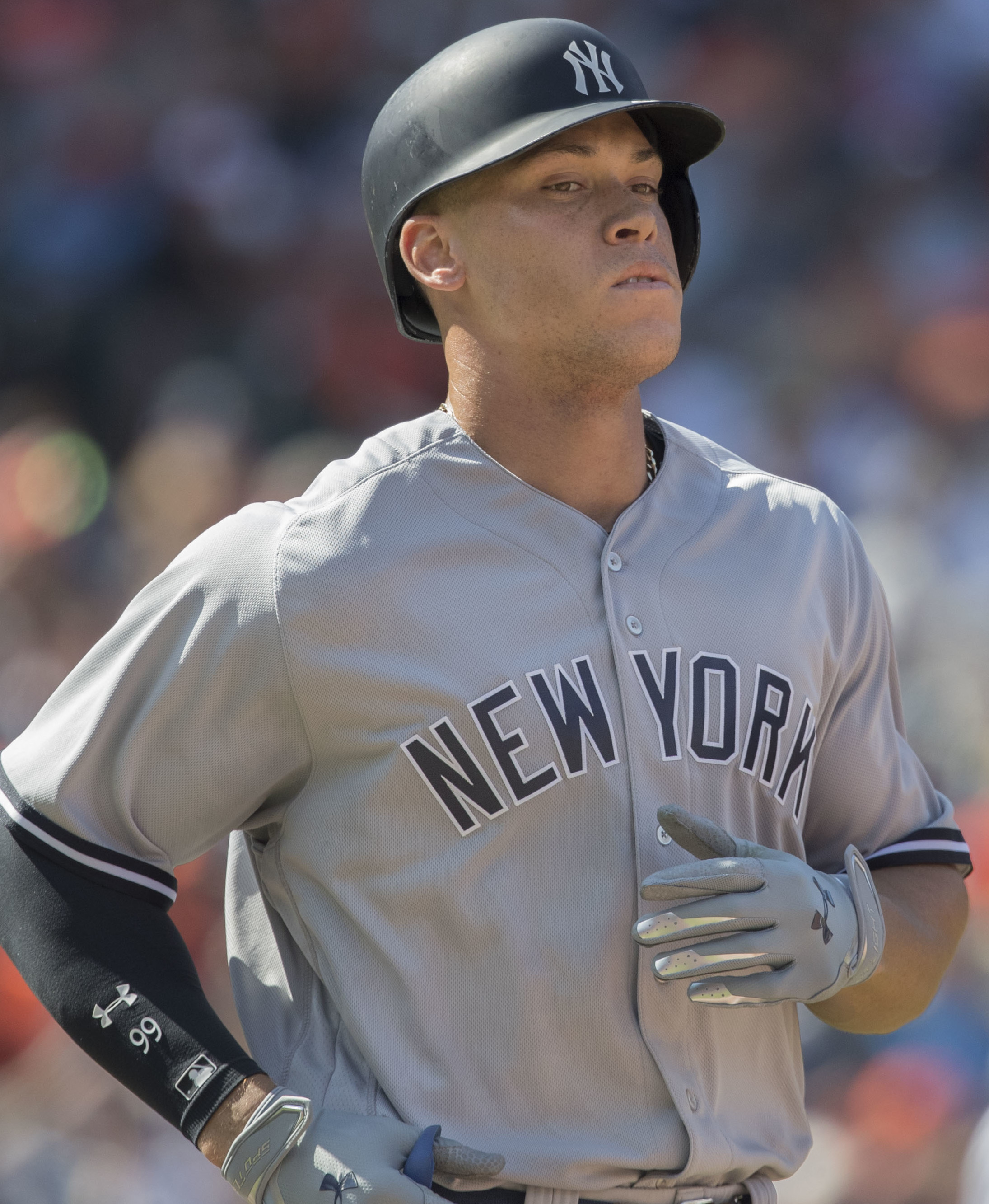
Aaron Judge, the active leader and 9th all-time in career OPS.

Rank	Player	OPS
1	Babe Ruth*	1.1636
2	Ted Williams*	1.1155
3	Lou Gehrig*	1.0798
4	Oscar Charleston*	1.0632
5	Barry Bonds	1.0512
6	Jimmie Foxx*	1.0376
7	Turkey Stearnes*	1.0340
8	Mule Suttles*	1.0299
9	**Aaron Judge**	1.0196
10	Hank Greenberg*	1.0169
11	Rogers Hornsby*	1.0103
12	Manny Ramirez	.9960
13	Mark McGwire	.9823
14	Mickey Mantle*	.9773
15	Joe DiMaggio*	.9771
16	Stan Musial*	.9757
17	**Yordan Alvarez**	.9751
18	Frank Thomas*	.9740
19	Larry Walker*	.9654
20	**Mike Trout**	.9627
21	Johnny Mize*	.9591
22	Jud Wilson*	.9588
23	Jim Thome*	.9560
24	Todd Helton*	.9531
25	**Shohei Ohtani**	.9484
26	Jeff Bagwell*	.9480
27	Mel Ott*	.9471
28	Willie Wells*	.9467
29	Ralph Kiner*	.9459
30	Lefty O'Doul	.9451
31	**Juan Soto**	.9446
32	Ty Cobb*	.9445
33	Dan Brouthers*	.9435
34	Lance Berkman	.9429
35	Willie Mays*	.9402
36	Shoeless Joe Jackson	.9401
37	Hack Wilson*	.9399
38	Albert Belle	.9333
	Edgar Martínez*	.9333
40	Vladimir Guerrero*	.9312
41	David Ortiz*	.9310
42	Chipper Jones*	.9304
43	Harry Heilmann*	.9300
44	Alex Rodriguez	.9299
45	Carlos Delgado	.9293
46	Hank Aaron*	.9285
47	Earl Averill*	.9283
	Tris Speaker*	.9283
49	Charlie Keller	.9276
50	Frank Robinson*	.9259

Rank	Player	OPS
51	Ken Williams	.9238
52	Chuck Klein*	.9218
53	Mike Piazza*	.9217
54	Joey Votto	.9205
55	Duke Snider*	.9194
56	Albert Pujols	.9181
57	Ed Delahanty*	.9165
58	Jason Giambi	.9157
59	Babe Herman	.9148
60	Al Simmons*	.9147
61	Dick Allen*	.9117
62	Mike Schmidt*	.9075
63	Ken Griffey Jr.*	.9073
64	Gary Sheffield	.9070
65	Mo Vaughn	.9058
66	Juan González	.9039
67	Jim Edmonds	.9030
68	Brian Giles	.9022
69	**Bryce Harper**	.9021
70	Bill Joyce	.9020
71	Miguel Cabrera	.9005
72	Bob Johnson	.8987
	Bill Terry*	.8987
74	Chick Hafey*	.8980
75	Mickey Cochrane*	.8970
76	**Ronald Acuña Jr.**	.8949
77	Hal Trosky	.8925
78	Ryan Braun	.8906
79	**Freddie Freeman**	.8899
80	Sam Thompson*	.8896
81	Willie McCovey*	.8891
82	Matt Holliday	.8889
83	Willie Stargell*	.8887
84	Larry Doby*	.8882
85	Billy Hamilton*	.8875
86	Prince Fielder	.8873
87	Jake Stenzel	.8868
88	Goose Goslin*	.8867
89	Jackie Robinson*	.8865
90	Fred McGriff*	.8860
91	Eddie Mathews*	.8855
92	Rafael Palmeiro	.8852
93	Moisés Alou	.8850
94	Harmon Killebrew*	.8842
95	Charlie Gehringer*	.8841
96	Tim Salmon	.8836
97	Monte Irvin*	.8833
98	Roger Connor*	.8828
99	George Selkirk	.8826
100	Nomar Garciaparra	.8821
