= Nomar Garciaparra =

American baseball player (born 1973)

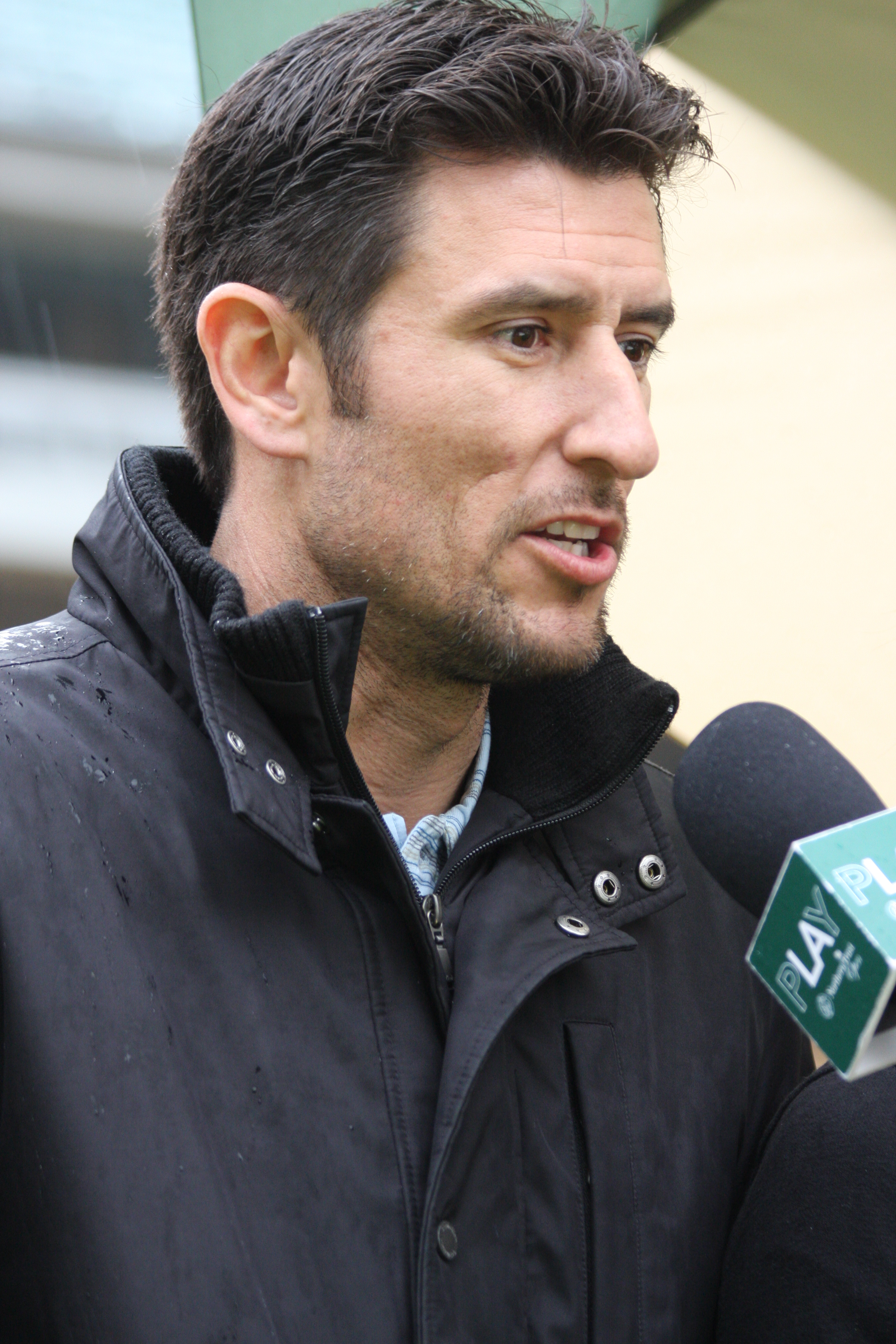
- Garciaparra in 2010
- Shortstop
- Born: July 23, 1973 (age 53); Whittier, California, U.S.
- Batted: Right Threw: Right

MLB debut
- August 31, 1996, for the Boston Red Sox

Last MLB appearance
- October 4, 2009, for the Oakland Athletics

MLB statistics
- Batting average: .313
- Home runs: 229
- Runs batted in: 936
- Stats at Baseball Reference

Teams
- Boston Red Sox (1996–2004); Chicago Cubs (2004–2005); Los Angeles Dodgers (2006–2008); Oakland Athletics (2009)

Career highlights and awards
- 6× All-Star (1997, 1999, 2000, 2002, 2003, 2006); AL Rookie of the Year (1997); Silver Slugger Award (1997); NL Comeback Player of the Year (2006); 2× AL batting champion (1999, 2000); Boston Red Sox Hall of Fame

Anthony Nomar Garciaparra (/ˈnoʊmɑːr ɡɑːrˌsiːəˈpɑːrə/; born July 23, 1973) is an American former professional baseball player and current SportsNet LA analyst. He retired after fourteen seasons in Major League Baseball (MLB), spending most of his career as a shortstop for the Boston Red Sox and later playing third and first base with the Chicago Cubs, Los Angeles Dodgers, and Oakland Athletics. Garciaparra is one of 13 players in MLB history to hit two grand slams during a single game, and the only player to achieve the feat at his home stadium.

Garciaparra is a six-time All-Star (1997, 1999, 2000, 2002, 2003, 2006), and was the American League (AL) Rookie of the Year and AL Silver Slugger Award winner at shortstop in 1997. In 2001, he suffered a wrist injury, the first in a series of significant injuries that plagued the remainder of his career. Known for his ability to hit for a high batting average, Garciaparra had a career .313 average. He had the highest single-season batting average by a right-handed batter in the post-war era, batting .372 in 2000, and won the AL Batting Title in 1999 and 2000, the first right-handed batter to accomplish this in consecutive seasons since Joe DiMaggio.

Garciaparra was also famed for his long and quirky batting stance, which he claimed helped him focus and get comfortable before each pitch.

== Early years ==
Garciaparra, who is of Mexican-American descent, was born in Whittier, California, and attended St. John Bosco High School in Bellflower, California. His middle name comes from his father, Ramon; Nomar is "Ramon" spelled backwards. When Nomar was a young boy, his father stressed the importance of not striking out, offering him 25 cents for each hit in tee ball and fining him 50 cents for every strikeout. When Nomar was 13, Ramon once put him in a batting cage against a college pitcher who could throw 90 miles per hour (140 km/h). After missing the first pitch, Nomar proceeded to hit solid line drives on the next two pitches. As a boy, Nomar was nicknamed "No Nonsense Nomar" for his methodical and tireless preparation as an athlete.

The Milwaukee Brewers selected Garciaparra in the fifth round of the 1991 draft, however, he did not sign. Instead, he enrolled at the Georgia Institute of Technology, where he played college baseball for the Georgia Tech Yellow Jackets. Garciaparra helped the Yellow Jackets reach the College World Series title game in 1994; they lost to Oklahoma. Garciaparra was an Atlantic Coast Conference All-Star and a first team All-American twice in 1993–94. He batted .427 in his final season at Georgia Tech. In 1992 Garciaparra played on the United States Olympic Baseball team in the Summer Olympics in Barcelona. In 1993, he played collegiate summer baseball for the Orleans Cardinals of the Cape Cod Baseball League (CCBL). Garciaparra batted .321 and led Orleans to the league championship. He was inducted into the CCBL Hall of Fame in 2002.

== Professional career ==
=== Minor leagues ===
Following his career at Georgia Tech, Garciaparra was a first-round draft pick of the Red Sox in 1994, and entered the Red Sox farm system. He began his professional career in Class A Advanced, as a member of the Sarasota Red Sox following his NCAA season. Since the season was already well underway by the point Garciaparra joined the team, he only appeared in 28 games. However, he batted .295 and hit his first professional home run. In 1995, Garciaparra moved up to join the Double-A Trenton Thunder. In 125 games, he batted .267 with eight home runs and again walked more than he struck out. He also showcased his speed, stealing 35 bases, and continued gathering experience at shortstop. After the 1995 season, rather than go home, Garciaparra embarked on an ambitious off-season training regimen to add 15 pounds of muscle. In 1996, he found himself at the highest level of the minors playing for the Triple-A Pawtucket Red Sox. That season, Garciaparra batted .343 with 16 home runs and 46 RBI in just 43 games and earned a late-season call up to the Major Leagues.

=== Boston Red Sox (1996–2004) ===
==== 1996–1997 ====
Garciaparra made his Major League debut on August 31, 1996, as a defensive replacement against Oakland, going 0-for-1. His first Major League hit was a home run off Oakland pitcher John Wasdin on September 1, a game in which Garciaparra recorded three hits. Garciaparra batted .241 with four home runs, 16 RBI, and five stolen bases in his initial stint with the club at the end of 1996. On September 18, 1996, Garciaparra stole his first major league base against the Tigers, which happened on the same night where Roger Clemens tied his own MLB record for striking out 20 batters in a game.

When he returned in 1997, Garciaparra set the league on fire in his rookie season. He hit 30 home runs among his 209 base hits (a Red Sox rookie record), and drove in 98 runs, setting a new MLB record for RBIs by a leadoff hitter and most homers by a rookie shortstop. He also batted .306, and his 30-game hitting streak set an A.L. rookie record. Garciaparra also stole 22 bases, and his 11 triples led the league. He was named Rookie of the Year in a unanimous vote, competed in the Home Run Derby as well as his first MLB All-Star Game, finished eighth in MVP voting, and captured the Silver Slugger Award for AL Shortstop. He also won the immediate admiration of Red Sox fans, who referred to him in Boston accents as "NO-mah!".

==== 1998–2000 ====
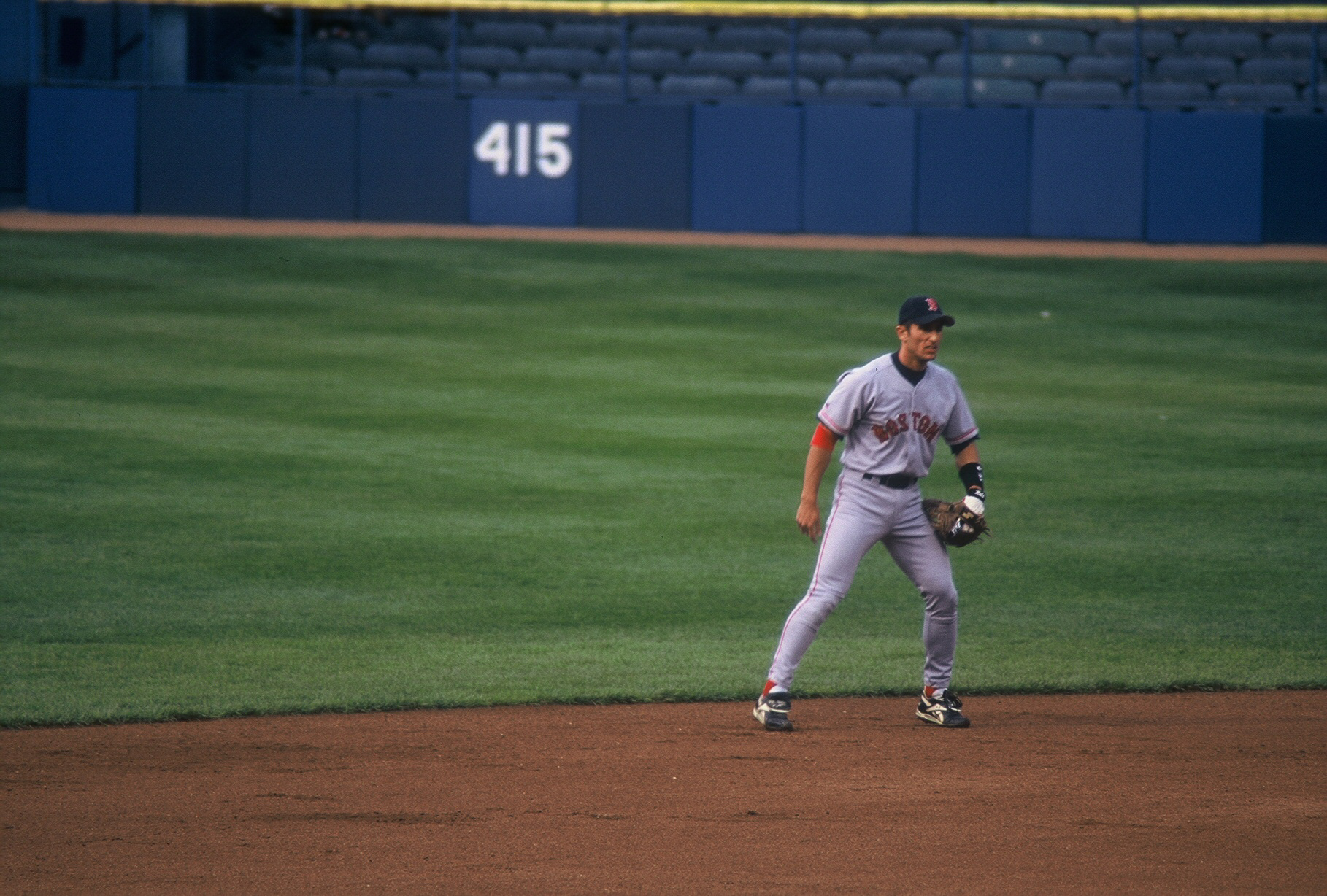
Garciaparra as a member of the Red Sox

In the spring of 1998, Garciaparra and the Red Sox signed a five-year contract worth $23.25 million. The deal also included two team options (for 2003 and 2004) that, if exercised, would boost the deal to $44.25 million. At the time, it was unprecedented for a team to sign a player who had just completed his rookie season to a long-term contract. Once the 1998 season started, Garciaparra moved down in the batting order, typically batting third or cleanup. He finished with 35 home runs and 122 RBI in 1998, and was the runner-up for AL MVP. His batting average of .323 was good for sixth in the AL among qualifiers.

Both he and teammate Pedro Martínez were instrumental in leading the Red Sox to the postseason. Though the team lost to the Cleveland Indians in the 1998 American League Division Series, Garciaparra had an outstanding postseason debut in the series, batting .333 with 3 homers and 11 RBI in the four-game loss. He hit a memorable three-run home run in the fifth inning of Game 1, the only game in the series the Red Sox won.

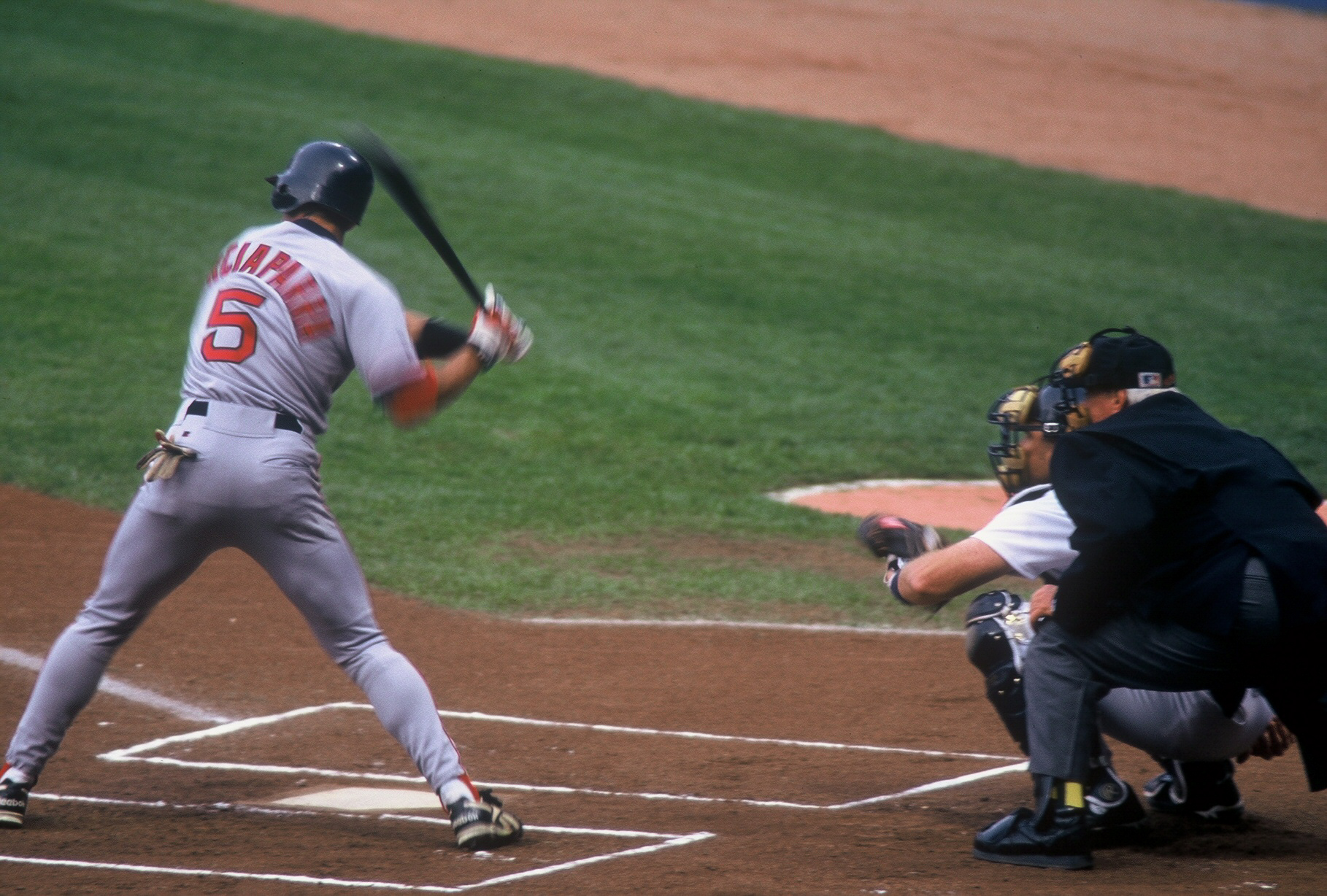
Garciaparra batting with the Red Sox

Garciaparra then continued to come into his own in 1999, winning the batting title by hitting .357 (including .400 against left-handed pitchers). He reached the century mark in RBIs once again, with 27 home runs and 104 batted in over the course of only 135 games. On May 10, he hit three home runs, including two grand slams, and drove in 10 RBI in a game against the Seattle Mariners. He was named an MLB All-Star in 1999, earning the right to start at shortstop and bat second for the game which took place in front of his hometown fans at Boston's Fenway Park. Again, he led the Red Sox to the postseason, where they defeated the Indians in five games in the 1999 American League Division Series, and Nomar was again a key cog, despite battling injury as he hit .417 in the four games he was able to appear in. Garciaparra became the first player in MLB history to hit safely and score a run in the first five games of his post-season career (1998–99), a feat completed in Game 1 of the 1999 ALDS. He is since joined by Ian Kinsler (2010) as the only other player to start his post-season career in that manner. Against the New York Yankees in the 1999 American League Championship Series, Garciaparra was again at his finest, hitting .400 with two home runs, but the team lost in five games. After the season, he finished seventh in MVP voting.

The year 2000 was a year of transition for the Red Sox, but very little changed for Nomar. By the end of June, his average was sitting at .396, prompting some to speculate he might be the first batter to hit .400 since Ted Williams. Indeed, Garciaparra did reach the mark, batting .403 as late in the season as July 20. However, as the summer went on, Garciaparra's batting average slipped from those lofty heights. He finished the season with a .372 batting average, which was the highest batting average by a right-handed batter in the post-war era. Garciaparra also easily won the American League batting title, becoming the first right-handed batter to win consecutive titles in the American League since Joe DiMaggio. He also homered 21 times and drove in 96 runs. Despite the strong individual play, the Red Sox missed the postseason in 2000.

==== 2001 ====
In February 2001, a shirtless and muscular Garciaparra appeared on the cover of Sports Illustrated, with the headline "A Cut Above... baseball's toughest out". Sports Illustrated later described the cover photo as "controversial", adding that it "forever fueled the inevitable speculation of steroid usage". Baseball fans looked forward to see if he might challenge the .400 mark, and Red Sox fans hoped he would lead them back to the postseason with new acquisition Manny Ramirez. However, the week after the issue hit newsstands, Garciaparra aggravated an old wrist injury and had to start the season on the disabled list.

He did not play in his first game during 2001 until July 29, though he hit a memorable home run on his return in that game. However, by the end of August, the wrist acted up yet again, and Garciaparra missed the rest of the season due to the injury. He only saw action in 21 games, batting .289 with 4 homers and 8 RBI during the shortened campaign. Many believe that the wrist injury not only ruined his season, but altered the trajectory of his career. Before the 2001 season, Scott Boras had run a statistical study of Garciaparra for his own client (Alex Rodriguez) predicting that by age 40, Nomar would hit 513 home runs, have 3,581 hits, and have .336 career batting average.

==== 2002–03 ====
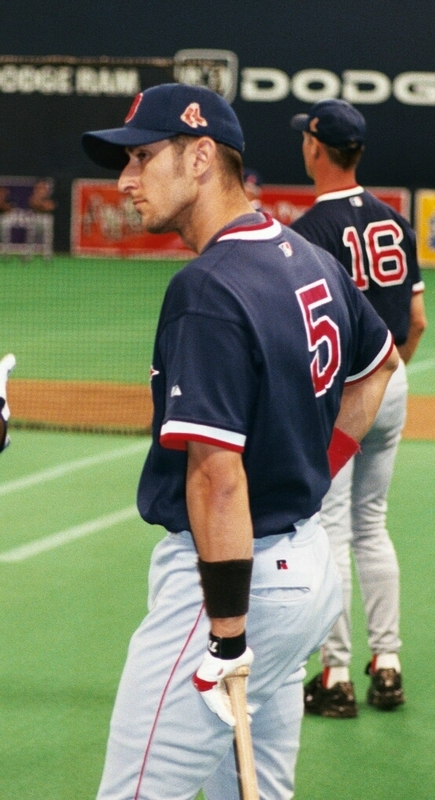
Garciaparra with the Red Sox in 2002

By the start of the 2002 season, Garciaparra had recovered from his wrist injury. He posted a .310 mark in 2002, homering 24 times, and driving in 120 runs. His 56 doubles led the league. On July 23 (his 29th birthday), he homered three times and drove in eight runs in the first game of a doubleheader against the Tampa Bay Devil Rays. On September 2, Garciaparra recorded his 1,000th hit in his 745th game, becoming the fastest Red Sox player to the milestone, in a game against the New York Yankees. Garciaparra was recognized by baseball in making his fourth MLB All-Star Game, and he finished 11th in AL MVP voting at the end of the season. That season, Garciaparra played in 156 games, the highest single season total of his career. However, even with Nomar helping the team win 93 games during the season, the Red Sox did not qualify for the postseason.

Before the 2002 season, a new ownership group led by John W. Henry purchased the Red Sox. Contract extension negotiations between Garciaparra's agent (Arn Tellem) and Red Sox brass went on during the offseason, but an agreement could not be reached. Though the sides agreed on a four-year, $60 million deal, the sticking point was the $8 million signing bonus Garciaparra requested. Garciaparra entered the 2003 season without a new pact. In 2003, Garciaparra had another productive All-Star season. On April 20, he hit a walk-off home run to give the Red Sox a 6–5 win over the Toronto Blue Jays. He batted .319 over the season's first half, earning yet another All-Star selection, but a late season slump caused him to finish at .301. His 28 home runs were the most he had hit in a single season since 1998, and he drove in 105 runs. He appeared in 156 games again, tying his career high from the previous year. The Red Sox returned to MLB's postseason for the first time since 1999, largely due to a potent lineup that featured Garciaparra, Manny Ramirez, and David Ortiz.

Additionally, new stars and cult heroes, led by Kevin Millar, began to emerge in Boston. Garciaparra's September slump (he batted .170 during the month) followed him into the postseason. While he hit .300 in the 2003 American League Division Series against the Oakland Athletics, he did not drive in a run. The Red Sox won the series in five games to face the rival Yankees in the ALCS, where Garciaparra fared even worse. In the tense seven-game series, Garciaparra batted only .241 with just one RBI and an uncharacteristic eight strikeouts. However, he did record a memorable hit in Game 6, tripling and scoring on an error in the top of the seventh inning. At the time, Boston was down 6–4 and facing elimination, but the hit started a rally that saw the Red Sox come back and win 9–6 to force a Game 7. However, the Red Sox lost that game and the series on Aaron Boone's infamous extra-inning walk-off home run.

With Garciaparra's contract situation still not settled, Red Sox management explored trading Manny Ramírez to the Texas Rangers for shortstop Alex Rodriguez after the 2003 season. Simultaneously, the team had exploratory talks with the Chicago White Sox about trading Garciaparra for Magglio Ordóñez if the Alex Rodriguez trade was finalized. The Nomar talks had been intended to be covert but quickly leaked out, angering Garciaparra and his agent. In the end, the MLB Players Association objected to Rodriguez' willingness to sacrifice a huge amount of his $250 million contract to facilitate a deal to Boston, so both deals were shut down. After Aaron Boone injured his knee playing off-season basketball, it was the rival Yankees who instead acquired Rodriguez. Garciaparra thus returned to Boston for the start of the 2004 season in the final year of the old contract from March 1998, without an extension, and it quickly became clear that he was displeased with the team's handling of the situation. It was believed by Red Sox brass that Nomar would not return to Boston when his contract expired after the 2004 season.

==== 2004 ====
The 2004 season began with Garciaparra's future in Boston unresolved. Complicating matters was an Achilles' injury that kept him out until June. When he returned, Garciaparra continued to hit well, batting .321 with five home runs and 21 RBI in 38 games. On July 10, 2004, in a 14–6 win over the Rangers, Garciaparra went 4-for-5 with three runs batted in and fell a triple shy of the cycle. However, his defense saw a significant decline, primarily in his fielding range, which was believed to be due to the effects of his injury. General Manager Theo Epstein believed defense was the team's weak point, and felt he needed to improve it for Boston to have any shot at winning a World Series. Additionally, the nature of Garciaparra's injury required him to get frequent days off, which meant his bat was not even guaranteed to be in the lineup every day (and thus the weaker bats of the backup players would be during a pennant race). Finally, at the July 31, 2004, trading deadline, Boston decided to trade away Garciaparra. Garciaparra finished his Red Sox career with a .323 average, 178 home runs, and 690 RBI over parts of nine seasons. Boston would go on to win the 2004 World Series.

=== Chicago Cubs (2004–05) ===
==== 2004–05 ====
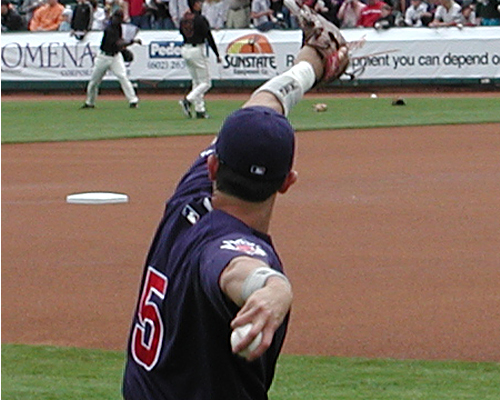
Garciaparra with the Cubs in 2005 spring training

On July 31, 2004 (the MLB trading deadline), Garciaparra was the key player involved in a four-team deal that sent him and Matt Murton to the wild-card-leading Chicago Cubs. The Red Sox received shortstop Orlando Cabrera from the Montreal Expos and first baseman Doug Mientkiewicz from the Minnesota Twins. Nomar expressed his appreciation to Red Sox fans in a speech to the media and left for Chicago. At first, Garciaparra was assigned jersey number 8, because Cub catcher Michael Barrett wore number 5, but a few days later, they switched numbers. Garciaparra drove in three runs in his first three games as a Cub. However, he continued to battle his Achilles' injury down the stretch, and in 43 games after the trade, he hit .297 with 4 home runs and 20 RBI in Chicago. Combined, his 2004 totals were a .308 average, nine home runs, and 41 RBI.

The Cubs led the wild card until mid-September, but finished the 2004 season with 89 wins and out of the playoffs. Meanwhile, the Red Sox finally overcame the Yankees en route to a World Series sweep of the St. Louis Cardinals, after which Garciaparra's former teammates voted to give him a World Series ring and three-fourths of a playoff share ($167,715). Curt Schilling noted that if not for Garciaparra, the Red Sox might not have been in a position to win at all, clearly referencing the role Garciaparra's ascension as a player had in drawing talent like Pedro Martínez, Manny Ramirez, and even himself to Boston.

After the season, Garciaparra was unable to get the long-term contract he had hoped for. His injury was the most significant reason why, as it was apparent he could still hit when healthy. So in the offseason, Garciaparra signed a 1-year deal worth $8.25 million to remain with the Cubs. Once the 2005 season began, a torn left groin forced him onto the disabled list in late April for more than three months. At the time of the injury, Garciaparra was hitting just .157. On April 23, 2005, following the publication of an op-ed in which Boston Globe columnist Bob Ryan speculated that Garciaparra's many injuries might be caused by steroid use, Garciaparra "flatly denied" having used steroids and called the speculation "ridiculous". Garciaparra resumed play on August 5, 2005, and almost immediately began raising his batting average. In late August, when Cubs regular third baseman Aramis Ramírez went on the disabled list for the remainder of the 2005 season, Garciaparra volunteered to play third base, and Cubs manager Dusty Baker agreed. Aside from his first game in the Majors, where he played second base, Nomar had played shortstop in all of his other Major League games up to that point in his career. Garciaparra finished 2005 with a .283 average, nine homers, and 30 RBI, and again became a free agent.

=== Los Angeles Dodgers (2006–08) ===
==== 2006 ====
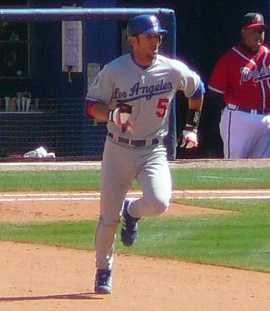
Garciaparra with the Dodgers in 2008

In 2006, Garciaparra returned to his hometown, signing with the Los Angeles Dodgers, near Garciaparra's childhood home in Whittier. The contract was again a one-year deal that Garciaparra hoped would lead to a multi-year offer following a strong season. The contract was worth $6 million, with another $2.5 million in performance bonuses. Also part of the lure of the Dodgers was that former Red Sox players Bill Mueller and Derek Lowe, and former manager Grady Little, were already with the team. Though he was able to retain his original jersey number (5), he moved to first base, as the Dodgers had also signed Rafael Furcal from the Atlanta Braves to step in for the recovering César Izturis at shortstop.

Healthy for the first extended period of time since 2003, Garciaparra regained his offensive stroke. On June 6, while facing the New York Mets Nomar hit a two-run home run on the first pitch he ever saw against former teammate and fellow Boston icon Pedro Martínez. Coincidentally, Derek Lowe was the starting pitcher for the Dodgers that day. Just days later, on June 9, Garciaparra's batting average stood at .370. On June 25, he hit his 200th career home run against the Pittsburgh Pirates. By the MLB All-Star Break, Nomar was tied with Pittsburgh's Freddy Sanchez for the lead in batting average among all MLB infielders and all NL batters with a .358 batting average, to go along with 11 home runs and 53 RBIs, and carrying a 21-game hitting streak into the break. It was the second highest batting average entering the All-Star Break by a Dodger since they moved into Dodger Stadium in 1962, with the only higher mark being held by Mike Piazza (.363 in 1996). Garciaparra was rewarded for his strong first half with his sixth All-Star selection. The selection came as the National League All-Star Final Vote winner, as he received about six million fan votes to earn the honor. It was his first All-Star appearance since 2003, and his first selection at any position other than shortstop.

Nomar adjusted well to playing first base, only committing one error through his first 588.2 innings played, and finishing with four for the entire season. However, his lofty batting average steadily declined to .303 by the end of the season as nagging injuries returned. Despite this, he prevailed in the clutch for the Dodgers during their playoff race with two game-winning home runs. The first capped off one of the most remarkable games of the season on September 18, as the Dodgers hit four consecutive home runs in the ninth inning against the San Diego Padres to tie the game. After the Padres scored a run in the tenth inning, Garciaparra hit a game-winning, two-run walk-off home run in the bottom of the 10th inning to win the game 11–10. Six days later on September 24, Garciaparra hit a game-winning grand slam against the Arizona Diamondbacks to give the Dodgers a 5–1 victory with one week left in the regular season. The Dodgers went on to win their last seven games of the regular season, qualifying for the postseason. For the season, Garciaparra batted .303 with 20 home runs and 93 RBI, and struck out only 30 times, in 122 games. On October 7, Garciaparra was named the National League's Comeback Player of the Year for 2006. He received 72,054 votes. Ultimately, the Dodgers were swept by the New York Mets in the 2006 NLDS. Garciaparra batted only .222 in the series, but did drive in 2 runs. On November 20, 2006, the Dodgers re-signed Garciaparra to a two-year contract worth $18.5 million, keeping him with the team through the 2008 season.

==== 2007–08 ====
Garciaparra got off to a strong start in 2007, batting .307 in April, but did not hit for power as he usually did, with only 1 home run during the first two and a half months of the season. On June 25, 2007, Garciaparra volunteered to move from first to third base in order to make room for rookie James Loney. He missed time in August and September due to injury, but still appeared in 121 games. His numbers were down, however, as he batted .283 with just 7 home runs and 59 RBI.

During 2008 spring training Garciaparra suffered a microfracture to his hand after a hit-by-pitch. That forced him to start the 2008 MLB season on the Disabled List. Rookie Blake DeWitt played third base in the meantime. On April 16, he started his first game against the Pittsburgh Pirates, only to suffer a strained left calf muscle nine days later, resulting in another trip to the DL. He returned July 4, playing at shortstop for the first time since 2005 due to an injury to Rafael Furcal. On August 1, Garciaparra was placed on the DL to make room for Manny Ramirez, who had been acquired in a trade. Garciaparra had sprained his knee in a July 27 contest against the Washington Nationals after being slid into spikes-first at third base as Garciaparra had attempted to field a throw and tag the runner, Lastings Milledge.

He returned on August 12, and continued seeing time at shortstop through the end of the month. On August 13, he hit a walk-off home run against the Philadelphia Phillies, giving the Dodgers a 7–6 win. Garciaparra actually saw more time at shortstop during 2008 than any other position to accommodate other players on the Dodgers. But by September, he was back to seeing time at first base and third base, and being used as a pinch hitter. Despite the return to the position he enjoyed the most success in his career, it was a difficult season for Nomar. He hit .264 for the year, with 8 home runs and 28 RBI, as he appeared in only 55 games. The Dodgers met the Phillies in the 2008 NLCS once the postseason started, and Garciaparra hit well, going 3-for-7 (.429) with 1 RBI in the series. However, he did not appear in Game 1, and subsequently did not play the entirety of any game in the series, as he was either used as a substitute, or was replaced as the game went on in Games 2–5. The Dodgers were defeated in the fifth game by the Phillies, who eventually moved on to win the 2008 World Series.

=== Oakland Athletics ===
==== 2009 ====
On March 6, 2009, Garciaparra signed a one-year deal with the Oakland Athletics. With the acquisition of Matt Holliday from the Colorado Rockies in the off-season, Garciaparra was not granted his accustomed number 5, instead wearing number 1. Immediately after Holliday's trade to the St. Louis Cardinals, Eric Patterson was called up and given number 5. Garciaparra and Patterson subsequently switched numbers. In his final season, Garciaparra batted .281 with three home runs and 16 RBI in 65 games with Oakland.

==== Career statistics ====
In 1,434 games over 14 seasons, Garciaparra posted a .313 batting average (1,747-for-5,586) with 927 runs, 370 doubles, 52 triples, 229 home runs, 936 RBI, 95 stolen bases, 403 bases on balls, .361 on-base percentage, and .521 slugging percentage. He finished his career with an overall .975 fielding percentage. In 32 postseason games, he was productive, batting .321 (36-for-112) with seven home runs and 24 RBI.

== Retirement ==
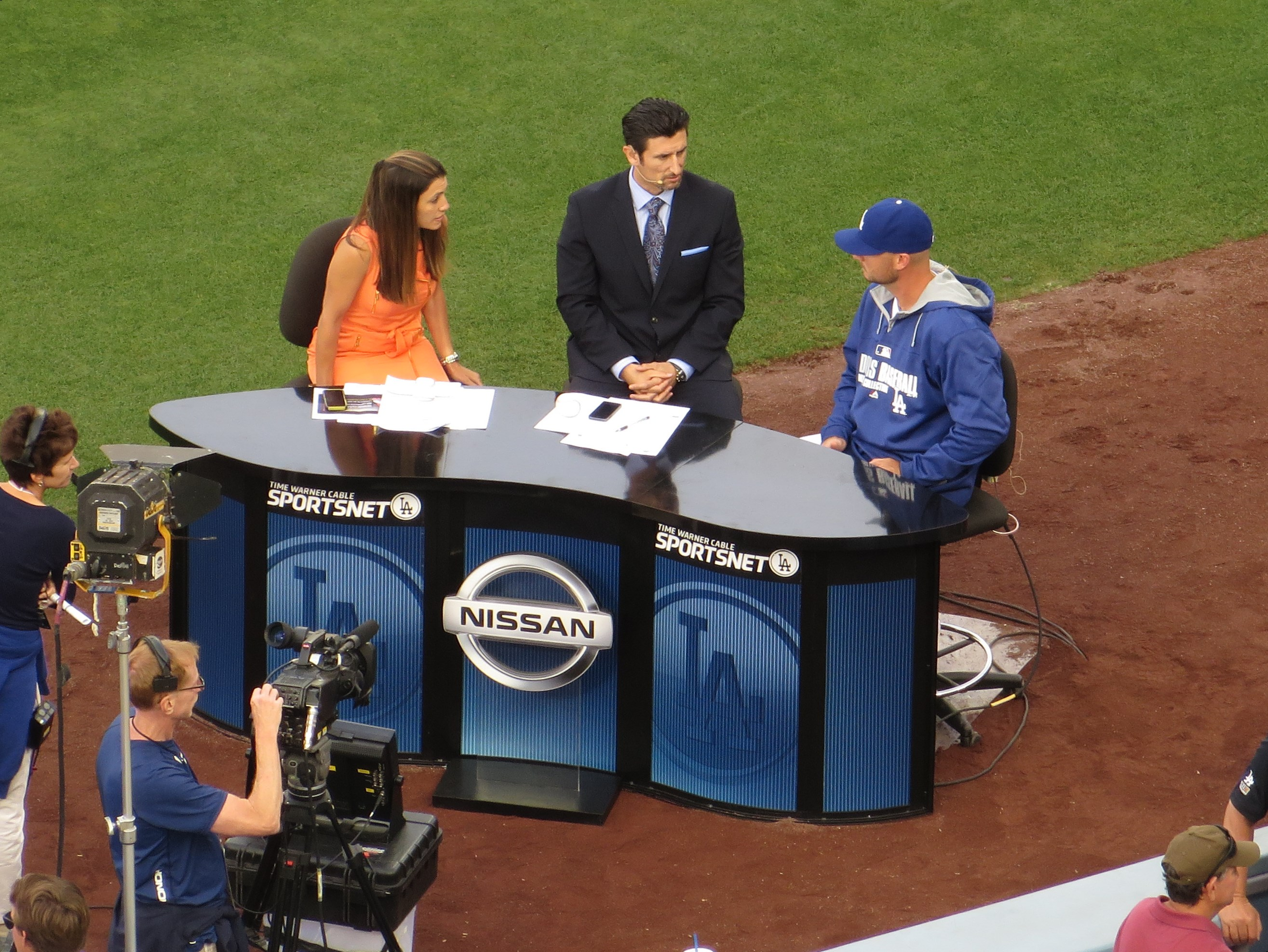
Garciaparra (center) with Alanna Rizzo (left) conducting a pregame interview at Dodger Stadium in 2014

On March 10, 2010, Garciaparra signed a one-day contract with the Boston Red Sox to enable him to retire as a member of the Red Sox. Garciaparra took a position at ESPN, contributing analysis for the program Baseball Tonight as well as select Wednesday Night Baseball telecasts. He has also been one of the lead analysts on ESPN's coverage of the College World Series.

On May 5, 2010, the Red Sox hosted "Nomar Garciaparra Night," honoring Garciaparra before a game against the Los Angeles Angels of Anaheim. He was given two official seats from Fenway by Johnny Pesky, one bearing Garciaparra's own number 5, and the other bearing Pesky's number 6.

Garciaparra threw out the first pitch on Nomar Day, with his signature off-balance sidearm throw, to his former teammate, Jason Varitek.

On December 2, 2013, the Los Angeles Dodgers announced that Garciaparra would be part of their broadcast team beginning with the 2014 season. He served as a pre-and-post game analyst for the Dodgers' telecasts on SportsNet LA, and also teamed with Rick Monday to call most of the team's road games on KLAC and the Dodgers Radio Network. However, a few months into the season he was promoted from the radio broadcasts and added to the television crew, working with Charley Steiner and Orel Hershiser on road games.

On Wednesday, February 5, 2014, it was announced that Garciaparra would be inducted into the Boston Red Sox Hall of Fame, along with former pitchers Pedro Martínez and Roger Clemens, as well as longtime radio announcer Joe Castiglione.

In a rare non-sports appearance, he had a gag cameo as himself on the October 14, 2000 episode of Saturday Night Live. The show itself had referenced Garciaparra during 14 sketches called The Boston Teens starring Jimmy Fallon and Rachel Dratch who played a pair of Lexington, Massachusetts teenagers. The duo were avid fans of the Boston Red Sox; in particular their favorite player, who they called: "Nomah" and sported team shirts.

In 2016, he still lived in Whittier with his family, and was doing commentary for local Los Angeles Dodgers broadcasts. By 2020, he and his family were based out of Manhattan Beach in California.

== Personal life ==
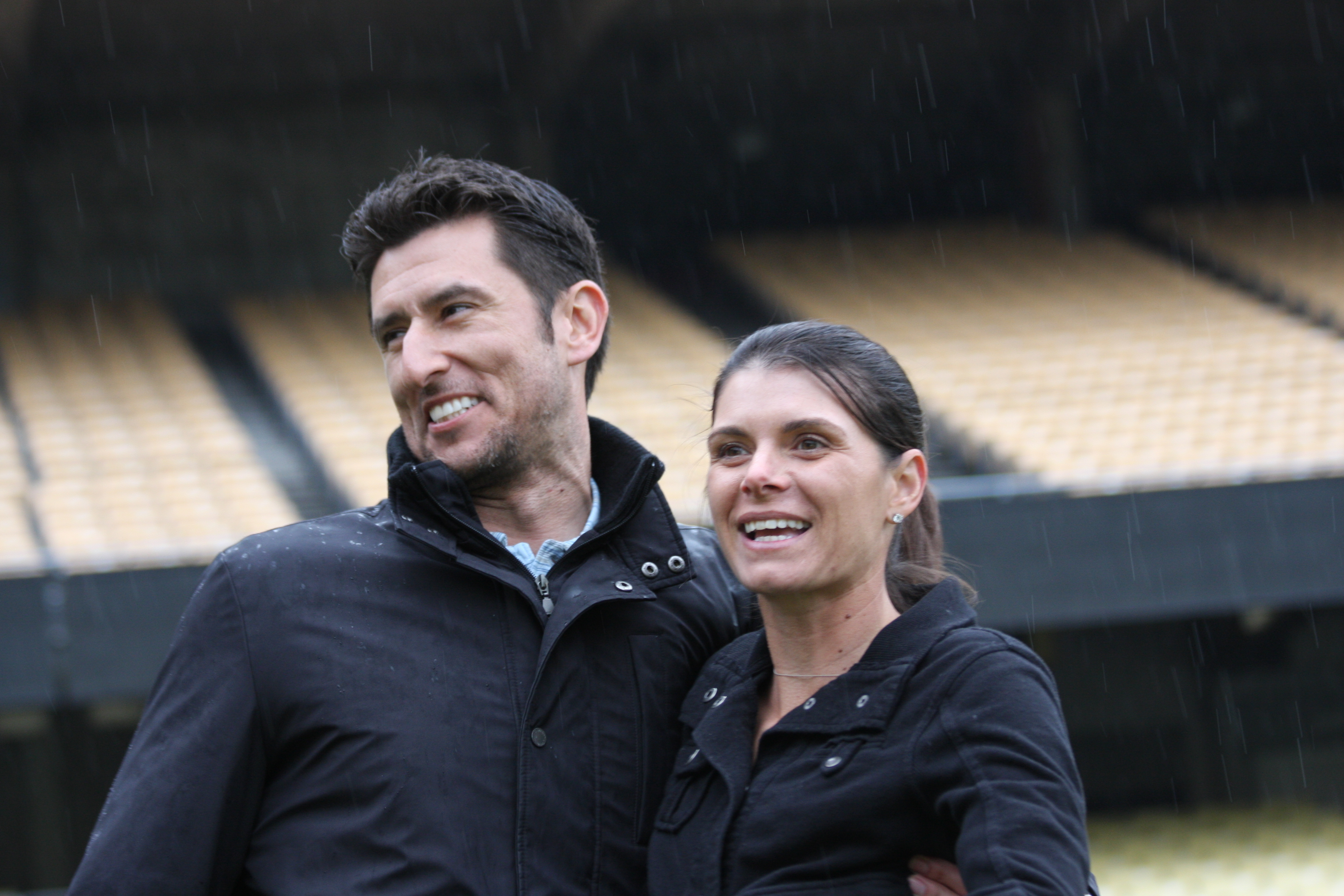
Garciaparra and wife Mia Hamm

Garciaparra's younger brother, Michael, was selected by the Seattle Mariners in the first round of the 2001 MLB draft and played in Minor League Baseball until 2010.

On November 22, 2003, Garciaparra married Olympian and World Cup Champion soccer star Mia Hamm. The couple has twin girls, Grace Isabella and Ava Caroline, born on March 27, 2007, in Los Angeles. The couple also welcomed their son, named Garrett Anthony, in January 2012. Hamm and Garciaparra originally met at a 1998 promotional event in Boston, where Hamm defeated Garciaparra in a soccer shootout. Hamm, married at the time, later stated that she was impressed with Garciaparra's passion for the game, and the two kept in touch as friends. Sometime after Hamm's 2001 divorce, the two began dating.

Garciaparra is known for his elaborate routine between pitches when batting. This includes batting glove adjustments and alternating toe taps on the ground prior to an ensuing pitch.

On October 7, 2005, Garciaparra and his uncle Victor Garciaparra were alerted to the screams of two women who fell into Boston Harbor outside his condominium. One woman sustained injuries to her head after hitting the pier on her way in. Garciaparra quickly jumped into the harbor and saved both women who were later taken to the hospital.

In November 2014, Garciaparra became a minority investor in Los Angeles F.C. of Major League Soccer (MLS), In 2022, LAFC won the MLS Cup, thus making Garciaparra an MLS champion as part owner.

== See also ==
- List of Boston Red Sox award winners
- List of Boston Red Sox team records
- List of Major League Baseball annual doubles leaders
- List of Major League Baseball annual fielding errors leaders
- List of Major League Baseball annual triples leaders
- List of Major League Baseball batting champions
- List of Major League Baseball career batting average leaders
- List of Major League Baseball career home run leaders
- List of Major League Baseball career OPS leaders
- List of Major League Baseball career slugging percentage leaders
- List of Major League Baseball doubles records
- List of Major League Baseball hit records
- List of Major League Baseball hitters with two grand slams in one game
- List of Major League Baseball home run records
- List of Major League Baseball runs batted in records
- List of Major League Baseball single-game grand slam leaders
- List of Major League Baseball single-game hits leaders
- List of Major League Baseball single-inning home run leaders
- List of Major League Baseball single-game runs batted in leaders
- Los Angeles Dodgers award winners and league leaders

Awards and achievements
Preceded by Derek Jeter	Baseball America Rookie of the Year; 1997	Succeeded by Kerry Wood
Preceded by Derek Jeter	Sporting News AL Rookie of the Year; 1997	Succeeded by Ben Grieve
Preceded by Derek Jeter	Players Choice AL Most Outstanding Rookie; 1997	Succeeded by Ben Grieve
Preceded by Derek Jeter	Baseball Prospectus Internet Baseball AL Rookie of the Year; 1997	Succeeded by Ben Grieve
Preceded by Manny Ramírez	American League Player of the Month; May, 1999	Succeeded by Rafael Palmeiro
