= Babe Davis =

American baseball player (1908–1981)

- Left fielder
- Born: September 10, 1908; Athens, Georgia, U.S.
- Died: July 18, 1981 (aged 72); Athens, Georgia, U.S.
- Batted: Right Threw: Right

Negro league baseball debut
- 1937, for the Atlanta Black Crackers

Last appearance
- 1940, for the Memphis Red Sox
- Stats at Baseball Reference

Teams
- Atlanta Black Crackers/Indianapolis ABCs (1937-1939); Homestead Grays 1939; Memphis Red Sox 1940

William Lyndon "Babe" Davis (September 10, 1908 – July 18, 1981) was an American professional baseball left fielder in the Negro leagues. He played from 1937 to 1940 with the Atlanta Black Crackers/Indianapolis ABCs, Homestead Grays, and Memphis Red Sox.
