= Babe Herman =

American baseball player (1903–1987)

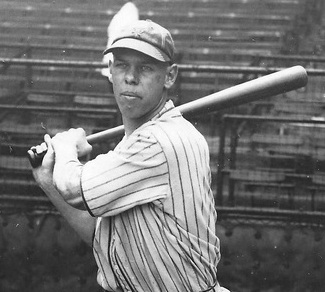
- Herman with the Brooklyn Robins in 1929
- Right fielder
- Born: June 26, 1903; Buffalo, New York, U.S.
- Died: November 27, 1987 (aged 84); Glendale, California, U.S.
- Batted: Left Threw: Left

MLB debut
- April 14, 1926, for the Brooklyn Robins

Last MLB appearance
- September 16, 1945, for the Brooklyn Dodgers

MLB statistics
- Batting average: .324
- Home runs: 181
- Runs batted in: 997
- Stats at Baseball Reference

Teams
- Brooklyn Robins (1926–1931); Cincinnati Reds (1932); Chicago Cubs (1933–1934); Pittsburgh Pirates (1935); Cincinnati Reds (1935–1936); Detroit Tigers (1937); Brooklyn Dodgers (1945)

Floyd Caves "Babe" Herman (June 26, 1903 – November 27, 1987) was an American professional baseball player and scout. He played in Major League Baseball (MLB) as a right fielder between 1926 and 1945, most prominently as a member of the Brooklyn Dodgers who were known as the Robins at that time. After his most productive years with the Robins, he ended his playing career playing for the Cincinnati Reds, Chicago Cubs, Pittsburgh Pirates and the Detroit Tigers.

Herman was one of the most impressive power hitters of the late 1920s and early 1930s, accumulating a career batting average of .324 and a number of Dodger franchise season records still in effect. At the time of his retirement in 1945, his .532 career slugging percentage ranked fourth among National League (NL) hitters with at least 5,000 at bats. His .393 batting average, .678 slugging percentage, 241 hits and 416 total bases produced during the 1930 season remain Dodgers franchise records, with his 143 runs being the post-1900 team record; he also set team records (since broken) that year with 35 home runs and 130 runs batted in. He hit for the cycle a record three times in his career, a record he shares with Bob Meusel, Adrián Beltré, Trea Turner, and Christian Yelich. He also hit two cycles in a single season (1931), a feat matched only by Aaron Hill in 2012 and Yelich in 2018.

Along with his hitting ability, Herman was one of baseball’s most colorful characters whose occasional baserunning mishaps and defensive lapses infuriated, and later endeared him to Brooklyn fans. His reputation went beyond the playing field with his penchant for malapropisms. After his playing career, he served as a scout for the Pirates, Phillies, Mets, Yankees and Giants organizations.

== Career ==
Born in Buffalo, New York and raised in Glendale, California, Herman signed with a minor league team in Edmonton, Alberta at age 18, and spent five years playing for six different teams, including tours in the farm systems of the Boston Red Sox and Detroit Tigers. In a 1922 spring training game, he was used as a pinch hitter for Ty Cobb; but the Tigers, with no outfield vacancies, returned him to the minors, where he hit .416. He was signed for Brooklyn in 1925 by a scout who said of him, "He's kind of funny in the field, but when I see a guy go 6-for-6, I've got to go for him." Herman made his major league debut as a first baseman with the Brooklyn Robins in 1926, hitting .319 as a rookie; he finished fourth in the National League in doubles (35), and seventh in home runs (11) and slugging (.500). In 1928, he placed fifth in the National League with a .340 batting mark.

Herman enjoyed an outstanding year in 1929, setting team records with a .381 batting average and a .612 slugging average (breaking club marks of .379 by Willie Keeler and .588 by Jack Fournier) while collecting 217 hits, 105 runs and 113 runs batted in (RBIs); but the National League was in the middle of an offensive explosion, and he finished behind Lefty O'Doul (.398) for the batting title and was only seventh in the league in slugging. He had two doubles and two triples on June 5, and came in eighth in the 1929 MVP voting.

He followed up in 1930 with his most spectacular year, improving his own batting and slugging records. His .393 batting average again placed him at second in the league behind Bill Terry, who hit .401 – as of 2025, the last .400 season in the NL. Herman was also third in the National League in slugging, behind Hack Wilson and Chuck Klein; the league as a whole batted .303 in 1930, and while Herman's 241 hits were only third in the National League behind Terry and Klein, it was then the fifth-highest total ever in the league. Herman hit 35 home runs, breaking Fournier's 1924 club record of 27 – in the process, becoming the last known player to hit a "bounce" home run – and tied his 1925 total of 130 RBIs. Gil Hodges would go on to break his team record with 40 home runs in 1951, and Roy Campanella would go on to post 142 runs batted in during 1953; Duke Snider was the first left-handed Dodger to break Herman's home run and runs batted in records. There was no MVP award given in 1930.

Herman was an outstanding hitter, but a markedly below-average fielder who led the National League in errors in 1927 as a first baseman and in each of the next two years playing in right field. Fresco Thompson, a 1931 teammate, observed: "He wore a glove for one reason: because it was a league custom." Herman developed a self-deprecating attitude about his shortcomings; when informed by a local bank that someone had been impersonating him and cashing bad checks, he said, "Hit him a few flyballs. If he catches any, it ain't me." He also claimed that he'd immediately quit if a flyball ever hit him on the head, and when someone asked if that included the shoulders, Herman replied, "No, only the head. Shoulders don't count." His style of play, along with that of the entire team, led to Brooklyn being dubbed "The Daffiness Boys", with sportswriter Frank Graham noting, "They were not normally of a clownish nature, and some of them were very good ballplayers, indeed, but they were overcome by the atmosphere in which they found themselves as soon as they had put on Brooklyn uniforms."

In the seventh inning of a game on August 15, 1926, against the Boston Braves at Ebbets Field, Herman tried to stretch a double off the right-field wall into a triple with one out and the bases loaded. Chick Fewster, who had been on first base, advanced to third base – which was already occupied by Dazzy Vance, who had started on second base but became caught in a rundown between third and home and was dashing back to third. All three men ended up on third base, with Herman not having watched the play in front of him. The Braves third baseman, Eddie Taylor, tagged all three just to be sure of getting as many outs as possible. The slow-footed Vance had been a major contributor to the situation, but according to the rules, because he was the lead runner and not forced to advance, he was entitled to third base, so umpire Beans Reardon called Herman and Fewster out. Thus, Herman "doubled into a double play," although Hank DeBerry also scored the game's winning run on the play before the daffiness started. Herman later complained that no one remembered that he drove in the winning run on the play. The incident led to the popular joke:

- "The Dodgers have three men on base!"
- "Oh, yeah? Which base?"

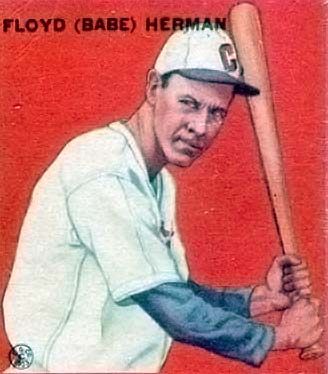
1933 Goudey Baseball Card of Babe Herman of the Chicago Cubs

On two occasions in 1930 – May 30 and September 15 – Herman stopped to watch a home run while running the bases and was passed by the hitter, in each case causing the home run to count only as a single. And on September 20 of the following year, he was thrown out trying to steal a base against the St. Louis Cardinals, even though the opposing catcher was 48-year-old Cardinals manager Gabby Street, appearing in his first game (as an emergency substitute) since 1912. Pitcher Vance dubbed him "the Headless Horseman of Ebbets Field" for his various mistakes.

In 1931, Herman's batting average fell to .313, and although he led the National League with 77 extra base hits, was third in total bases, and hit for the cycle on both May 18 and July 24, he was traded to the Cincinnati Reds before the 1932 season. He bounced back with a solid year, leading the National League with 19 triples and tying Sam Crawford's 1901 Reds' team record for left-handed hitters of 16 home runs, which was broken in 1936 by Ival Goodman with 17. Herman played for the Chicago Cubs in 1933–34, batting .304 in the latter season. On July 20, 1933, he hit three home runs, and on September 30 he hit for the cycle for the third time, a feat only he and Bob Meusel accomplished in the 20th century. (In 2015, Adrián Beltré also hit for the cycle a third time). After a brief stint with the Pittsburgh Pirates in 1935, Herman was traded back to the Reds, staying with them through 1936. On July 10, 1935, he hit the first home run ever in a major league night game. He played briefly for the Tigers in 1937, hitting .300 in 17 games, and then returned to the minor leagues. Nine years later in 1945, Herman was re-signed by Brooklyn at age 42 and played his 37 final big league games with the team. He received a strong ovation from the Ebbets Field crowd in his first turn at bat and tripped over the first base after hitting a single. After retiring, he worked as a scout for several teams until 1964. Herman ended his major league career with a .324 batting average, 1,818 hits, 181 home runs, 997 RBIs, 882 runs, 399 doubles, 110 triples, and 94 stolen bases in 1552 games. Herman hit better than .300 in eight full major league seasons.

His son was a mathematics teacher at Herbert Hoover High School, the cross-town rival of his high school Glendale High School, from the late 1960s through the early 1980s.

Herman was among the subjects interviewed for the 1966 book The Glory of Their Times. Herman died in Glendale, California at age 84 following a bout with pneumonia and a series of strokes. He is interred there in the Forest Lawn Memorial Park Cemetery.

== See also ==
- List of Major League Baseball career triples leaders
- List of Major League Baseball annual triples leaders
- List of Major League Baseball players to hit for the cycle

Achievements
Preceded by Chick Hafey; Chuck Klein; Earl Averill	Hitting for the cycle May 18, 1931; July 24, 1931; September 30, 1933	Succeeded by Chuck Klein; Tony Lazzeri; Doc Cramer
