= Lefty O'Doul =

American baseball player and manager (1897–1969)

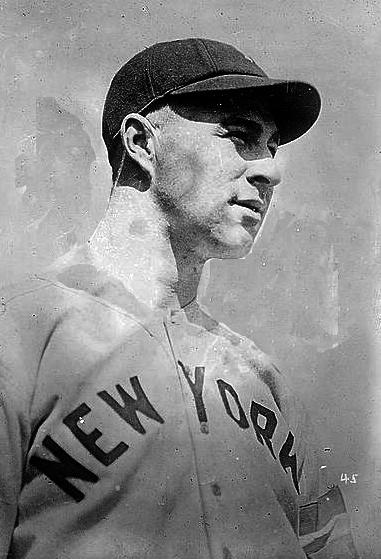
- O'Doul in 1919
- Left fielder
- Born: March 4, 1897; San Francisco, California, U.S.
- Died: December 7, 1969 (aged 72); San Francisco, California, U.S.
- Batted: Left Threw: Left

MLB debut
- April 29, 1919, for the New York Yankees

Last MLB appearance
- September 30, 1934, for the New York Giants

Career statistics
- Batting average: .349
- Home runs: 113
- Runs batted in: 542
- Stats at Baseball Reference

Teams
- New York Yankees (1919–1922); Boston Red Sox (1923); New York Giants (1928); Philadelphia Phillies (1929–1930); Brooklyn Robins / Dodgers (1931–1933); New York Giants (1933–1934)

Career highlights and awards
- All-Star (1933); World Series champion (1933); 2× NL batting champion (1929, 1932)

Member of the Japanese

Baseball Hall of Fame
- Induction: 2002

Francis Joseph "Lefty" O'Doul (March 4, 1897 – December 7, 1969) was an American professional baseball player and manager. Though he spent eleven seasons in Major League Baseball, most notably for the New York Giants and Philadelphia Phillies, he is best known for his career in the Pacific Coast League, where he was a star player and a successful manager. His .349 career batting average is the sixth highest in the history of Major League Baseball (MLB).

Born in San Francisco, California, O'Doul began his professional career as a left-handed pitcher with the minor-league San Francisco Seals of the Pacific Coast League. He served in the United States Navy from 1917-1919. His final duty station was Mare Island, and according to his obituary in the San Francisco Examiner, he separated from the Navy as a Seaman First Class (E-3).

He had some major-league success with the New York Yankees and Boston Red Sox from 1919 to 1923 as a relief pitcher. After developing a sore arm which forced him to give up pitching, he returned to the Pacific Coast League and transitioned into becoming a power-hitting outfielder. He returned to the majors in 1928, playing for the New York Giants. With the Philadelphia Phillies and the Brooklyn Robins, he won two batting titles. Traded back to the Giants in 1933, O'Doul became a World Series champion.

After his career ended, O'Doul returned to the Pacific Coast League, managing the San Francisco Seals from 1935 to 1951, as well as other Pacific Coast teams. What is considered by many to be his greatest contributions to baseball were the exhibition tours he undertook to Japan during which he helped with the training of Japanese baseball players both before and after World War II, contributed to the popularity and success of professional baseball in Japan. For his efforts, O'Doul became the second American elected to the Japanese Baseball Hall of Fame after Wally Yonamine. O'Doul and Joe DiMaggio went to Japan with their wives.

Long after his death in 1969, O'Doul remains one of the most popular figures in his hometown of San Francisco. He was elected to the Bay Area Sports Hall of Fame in 1981 and the Lefty O'Doul Bridge, connecting the China Basin and Mission Bay neighborhoods, was named in his honor. The gate entrance of Oracle Park adjacent to the bridge was named the "Lefty O'Doul Gate" by the San Francisco Giants.

== Professional career ==
=== Player ===
O'Doul began his professional career as a left-handed pitcher with the minor-league San Francisco Seals of the Triple-A Pacific Coast League. He had some major-league success with the New York Yankees and Boston Red Sox from 1919 to 1923 as a reliever. He pitched for the Red Sox in one notable game at Cleveland on July 7, 1923, that would go down in the record books. Relieving for starter Curt Fullerton, O'Doul gave up 16 runs over 3 innings of relief, with 14 of those runs coming in the 6th inning alone. Although errors committed by Red Sox fielders meant that only 3 of the 16 runs were earned, O'Doul set the major league record for most runs allowed by a reliever in one appearance, a record later equaled by St. Louis Cardinals pitcher Johnny Stuart in 1925 and Philadelphia Phillies pitcher Dutch Schesler in 1931 (although both needed 8 innings to allow 16 runs). Following the season, O'Doul developed a sore arm, which forced him to give up pitching.

After the 1923 season, the New York Giants returned O'Doul to the Pacific Coast League, where he was converted to a power-hitting outfielder. In 1927, he became the second of only four Pacific Coast League hitters to have hit 30 home runs and stolen 30 bases in a season (with the other three being Tony Lazzeri (1925), Frank Demaree (1934), and Joc Pederson (2014)).

O'Doul returned to the majors in 1928, where he batted .319 as a platoon player. In 1929, he was traded to the Philadelphia Phillies and, teaming up with Chuck Klein, had one of the best offensive years in baseball history, leading the league in batting at .398 with 254 hits, 32 home runs, 122 runs batted in, and 152 runs scored. His hit total broke the previous National League record of 250 by Rogers Hornsby of the 1922 St. Louis Cardinals. The record was tied by Bill Terry in 1930.

After batting .383 with 22 homers during the 1930 season, O'Doul was traded to the Brooklyn Robins (now the Los Angeles Dodgers). In 1932, he batted .368 for Brooklyn to win another league batting title. After a slow start in 1933, when he batted just .252 through 43 games, O'Doul was again traded, this time back to the Giants. He rallied to hit .306 the rest of the way that season, but played just one more year before ending his career in 1934.

In an 11-year major league career, he played in 970 games, 34 as a relief pitcher and the rest as an outfielder, posting a .349 batting average with 624 runs scored, 175 doubles, 41 triples, 113 home runs, and 542 runs batted in. His on-base percentage was .413 and slugging percentage was .532. In seven seasons between 1928 and 1934, when he became a regular outfielder, he hit .353. O'Doul hit over .300 six times, missing only in 1933 when he hit .284 playing with the Dodgers and Giants. He had 200+ hit seasons in 1929, 1930 and 1932. He had 6 five-hit games between 1929 and 1933, recording two each in 1929 and 1930 with the Phillies and one each in 1931 and 1933 with the Dodgers.

As a pinch hitter, he batted .303 (36-for-119) with 4 home runs and 36 RBI in his MLB career. In 1934, he had 21 RBI in a pinch hitting role in his final season in the majors.

=== Manager ===
O'Doul then returned to the Pacific Coast League as manager of the San Francisco Seals from 1935 to 1951, later managing several other teams in the circuit and becoming the most successful manager in PCL history. One of his outstanding accomplishments while managing the Seals was developing the young Joe DiMaggio, who went on to a Hall of Fame career with the New York Yankees. O'Doul refused to take credit for DiMaggio's success, saying, "I was just smart enough to leave [him] alone."

In addition to the Seals, O'Doul also managed the San Diego Padres (1952–1954), the Oakland Oaks, the Vancouver Mounties (1956), and the Seattle Rainiers (1957). He also made his final appearance as a player with Vancouver, appearing in one game.

== Legacy ==
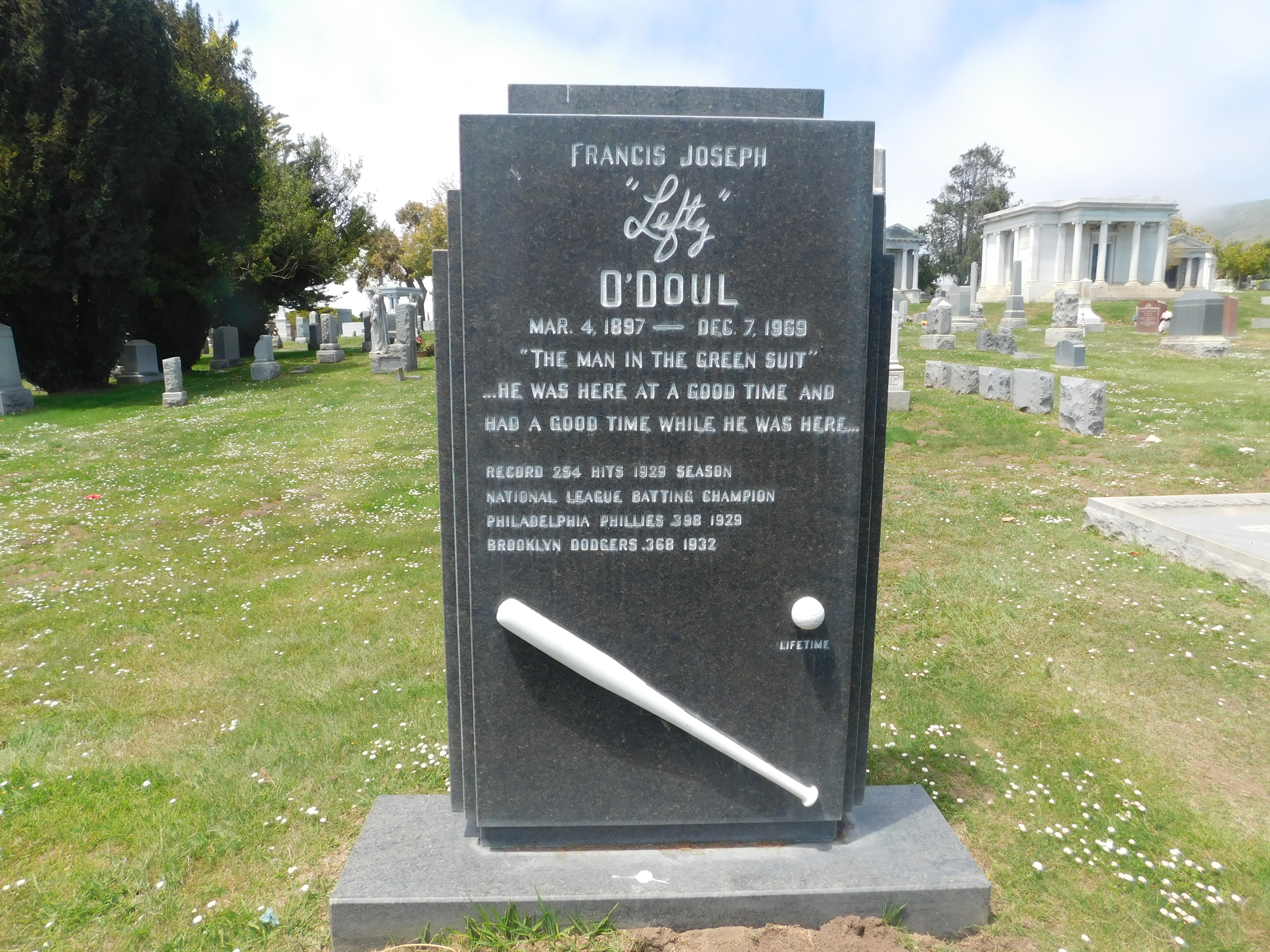
O'Doul's grave at Cypress Lawn Memorial Park in Colma, California

O'Doul was instrumental in spreading baseball's popularity in Japan, serving as the sport's goodwill ambassador before and after World War II. The Tokyo Giants, sometimes considered "Japan's Baseball Team", was named by him in 1935 in honor of his longtime association with the New York Giants; the logo and uniform of the Giants in Japan strongly resemble their North American counterparts.

O'Doul was inducted into the San Francisco Bay Area Sports Hall of Fame in 1981 and the Japanese Baseball Hall of Fame in 2002. He is also in the Pacific Coast League Hall of Fame. O’Doul was inducted into the Baseball Reliquary's Shrine of the Eternals in 2013.

O'Doul's fame and popularity live on in his hometown of San Francisco and are enhanced by the fact that his former team now thrives as the San Francisco Giants. The popular hofbrau-style restaurant and bar he founded in 1958 operated for years after his death as Lefty O'Doul's Restaurant and Cocktail Lounge on Geary Street, still serving his original recipe for Bloody Mary (although one news account says it was modified in the 1960s by O'Doul's bartender Chuck Davis). However, a landlord-tenant dispute caused the restaurant to close its doors in early 2017. In November 2018, the restaurant reopened in a new location at Fisherman's Wharf. However, the new location closed in 2020 during the COVID-19 pandemic and the owner's bankruptcy following a federal indictment on corruption charges.

A bridge over McCovey Cove, near the Giants' home field of Oracle Park, is named the Lefty O'Doul Bridge in his honor. Accordingly, the ballpark plaza and gate entrance adjacent to the bridge are also named after O'Doul.

Besides Shoeless Joe Jackson, O'Doul has the highest career batting average of any player eligible for the National Baseball Hall of Fame who is not enshrined. Further, O’Doul has the highest career OPS of any player eligible for the Hall of Fame who is not enshrined aside from players kept out due to their association with steroids (Barry Bonds, Manny Ramirez, Mark McGwire). On November 5, 2021, he was selected to the final ballot for the Baseball Hall of Fame's Early Days Committee for consideration in the Class of 2022. He received five of the necessary twelve votes.

== See also ==
- List of Major League Baseball batting champions
- List of Major League Baseball career batting average leaders
- List of Major League Baseball career on-base percentage leaders
