= Chester Williams (baseball) =

American baseball player

- Shortstop
- Born: May 25, 1906; Beaumont, Texas, U.S.
- Died: December 25, 1952 (aged 46); Lake Charles, Louisiana, U.S.
- Batted: Right Threw: Right

debut
- 1930, for the Memphis Red Sox

Last appearance
- 1942, for the Homestead Grays

Career statistics
- Batting average: .281
- Home runs: 10
- Runs batted in: 270

Teams
- Memphis Red Sox (1930); Chicago American Giants (1930); Indianapolis ABCs (1931); Homestead Grays (1932); Indianapolis ABCs (1932); Homestead Grays (1933); Pittsburgh Crawfords (1933–1938); Philadelphia Stars (1939); Homestead Grays (1941–1942)

Chester Arthur Williams (May 25, 1906 – December 25, 1952) was an American Negro league baseball shortstop for several teams between 1931 and 1943.

A native of Beaumont, Texas, Williams was selected for the East–West All-Star Game in each season from 1934 to 1937, and went 3-for-4 with a double in the 1934 game. He died in Lake Charles, Louisiana in 1952 at age 46. Williams was shot five times and killed at a nightclub he owned in the city.
