= Baseball Almanac =

Baseball history and statistics website

- Baseball Almanac logo
- Website type: Baseball history
- Available in: English
- Founder: Sean Holtz
- Website: www.baseball-almanac.com
- Commercial: No
- Registration: None
- Launched: April 24, 1999; 27 years ago
- Current status: Online
- Content license: All rights reserved

Baseball Almanac is an interactive baseball encyclopedia with over 500,000 pages of baseball facts, research, awards, records, feats, lists, notable quotations, baseball movie ratings, and statistics. Its goal is to preserve the history of baseball.

It serves, in turn, as a source for a number of books and publications about baseball, and/or is mentioned by them as a reference, such as Baseball Digest, Understanding Sabermetrics: An Introduction to the Science of Baseball Statistics, and Baseball's Top 100: The Game's Greatest Records. Dan Zachofsky described it in Collecting Baseball Memorabilia: A Handbook as having the most current information regarding members of the Hall of Fame.

David Maraniss, author of Clemente, the Passion and Grace of Baseball's Last Hero, described it as "an absolutely reliable and first-rate bountiful source, that supplied accurate schedules and box scores". Glenn Guzo, in The New Ballgame: Baseball Statistics for the Casual Fan, described it as having "a rich supply of contemporary and historic information". Film critic Richard Roeper described it in Sox and the City: A Fan's Love Affair with the White Sox from the Heartbreak of '67 to the Wizards of Oz as "one of the beauteous wonders of the Internet". Harvey Frommer, Dartmouth College Professor and sports author, said of Baseball Almanac: "Definitive, vast in its reach and scope, Baseball Almanac is a mother lode of facts, figures, anecdotes, quotations and essays focused on the national pastime.... It has been an indispensable research tool for me."
