= Buddy Burbage =

American baseball player (1907–1989)

- Outfielder
- Born: June 23, 1907; Salisbury, Maryland, U.S.
- Died: August 30, 1989 (aged 82); Philadelphia, Pennsylvania, U.S.
- Batted: Left Threw: Right

Negro league baseball debut
- 1928, for the Ewing's All-stars

Last appearance
- 1943, for the Philadelphia Stars

Career statistics
- Batting average: .300
- Hits: 232
- Home runs: 10
- Runs batted in: 113
- Stolen bases: 19
- Stats at Baseball Reference

Teams
- Ewing's All-stars (1928); Baltimore Black Sox (1929, 1932); Hilldale Club (1930); Pittsburgh Crawfords (1931, 1937); Baltimore Black Sox (1932); Bacharach Giants (1933); Newark Dodgers (1934); Homestead Grays (1934-1935); Washington Black Senators (1938); Philadelphia Stars (1940, 1943); Brooklyn Royal Giants (1940); New York Black Yankees (1941)

Career highlights and awards
- Negro National League batting champion (1934)

Knowlington Ottoway "Buddy" Burbage (June 23, 1907 – August 30, 1989) was an American professional baseball outfielder in the Negro leagues. He played from 1928 to 1943 with multiple clubs.
