= Branch Russell =

American baseball player

Russell Branch
- Outfielder
- Born: October 9, 1895; South Boston, Virginia, U.S.
- Died: May 1, 1959 (aged 63); St. Louis, Missouri, U.S.
- Batted: Left Threw: Right

Negro league baseball debut
- 1922, for the Kansas City Monarchs

Last appearance
- 1932, for the Cleveland Stars
- Stats at Baseball Reference

Teams
- As player: Kansas City Monarchs (1922); St. Louis Stars (1922–1931); Cleveland Stars (1932); As manager: St. Louis Stars (1926)

Branch Lee Russell (October 9, 1895 – May 1, 1959) was an American Negro league outfielder in the 1920s and 1930s.

A native of South Boston, Virginia, Russell grew up in Winchester, Massachusetts, and attended Henderson Institute in Henderson, North Carolina. He served in the United States Army during World War I, advancing to the rank of corporal. Russell made his Negro leagues debut in 1922 for the Kansas City Monarchs. Known as "a good contact hitter", he went on to spend the majority of his career with the St. Louis Stars, where he played for 10 years, and served as manager for part of the 1926 season. Russell died in St. Louis, Missouri in 1959 at age 63.
