= Earl Averill =

American baseball player (1902–1983)

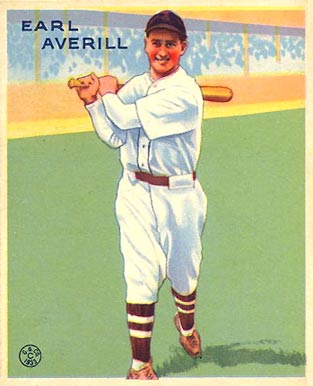
- Averill c. 1933
- Center fielder
- Born: May 21, 1902; Snohomish, Washington, U.S.
- Died: August 16, 1983 (aged 81); Everett, Washington, U.S.
- Batted: Left Threw: Right

MLB debut
- April 16, 1929, for the Cleveland Indians

Last MLB appearance
- April 25, 1941, for the Boston Braves

MLB statistics
- Batting average: .318
- Hits: 2,019
- Home runs: 238
- Runs batted in: 1,164
- Stats at Baseball Reference

Teams
- Cleveland Indians (1929–1939); Detroit Tigers (1939–1940); Boston Braves (1941)

Career highlights and awards
- 6× All-Star (1933–1938); Cleveland Guardians No. 3 retired; Cleveland Guardians Hall of Fame

Member of the National

Baseball Hall of Fame
- Induction: 1975
- Election method: Veterans Committee

Howard Earl Averill (May 21, 1902 – August 16, 1983), nicknamed "the Rock", was an American professional baseball player. He played in Major League Baseball (MLB) as a center fielder from 1929 to 1941, including 11 seasons for the Cleveland Indians. He was a six-time All-Star (1933–1938) and was elected to the Baseball Hall of Fame in 1975.

== Major League Baseball career ==
Born in Snohomish, Washington, Averill played for the San Francisco Seals in the Pacific Coast League. He broke into the Major Leagues in 1929 (at the age of 26) with the Cleveland Indians. He played for Cleveland for over ten years, and remains the all-time Indians leader in total bases, runs batted in (RBIs), runs, and triples. He also remains third in all-time Indians hits and doubles, and fourth in all-time Indians home runs and walks. During his time in Cleveland, the team never finished higher than third. His nickname was "the Earl of Snohomish". He famously hit the line drive that broke Dizzy Dean's toe in the 1937 All-Star Game. Dizzy, who had averaged 24 wins a season up to then, and only 4 wins a season after, changed his delivery due to the broken toe, damaged his arm, which led to his retiring in 1941 at the age of 31.

Averill was the first major league player to hit four home runs in a doubleheader (three home runs in the first game, one in the second game) on September 17, 1930; he was also one of the first players to hit a home run in his first Major League at-bat (April 16, 1929, opening day). Averill batted .378 in 1936, leading the American League in hits with 232, but finishing second to Luke Appling in the batting race (Appling batted .388 for the White Sox).

During a July 1 incident in 1935, Averill was lighting firecrackers with his four children as part of a pre-July 4 celebration. One exploded while he was holding it, and he suffered lacerations on the fingers of his right hand, as well as burns on his face and chest. After several weeks, he made a full recovery.

In 1937, Averill experienced temporary paralysis in his legs and was diagnosed with a congenital spine condition. This caused him to alter his batting style and become less of a power hitter.

Averill was traded to the Detroit Tigers in the middle of the 1939 season (June 14). The following season, his playing time was limited, but the Tigers reached the World Series. In the seven-game series against the Cincinnati Reds, the 38-year-old Averill went 0-for-3 in three pinch-hit attempts. The Reds won the series 4 games to 3.

In 1941, Averill struggled with the Boston Braves, batting just .118 (2-for-17) in 8 games and was released on April 29. He wound down his pro career by returning to the Pacific Coast League and playing for the Seattle Rainiers.

In a 13-year career, Averill was in 1,669 games played, compiling a .318 batting average (2,019-for-6,353) with 1,224 runs scored, 401 doubles, 128 triples, 238 home runs, 1,164 RBIs, 774 bases on balls, .395 on-base percentage and .534 slugging percentage. Defensively, he recorded a .970 fielding percentage. He hit better than .300 eight times. He recorded five 100+ RBI seasons in his major league career. Averill recorded five 5-hit games in his MLB career.

== After baseball ==
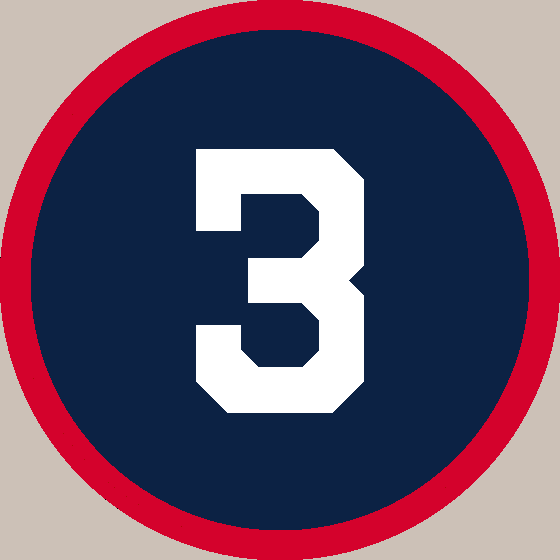
Earl Averill's number 3 was retired by the Cleveland Indians in 1975.

Averill detested the Hall of Fame's selection process. At his 1975 induction, he advocated for Ernie Lombardi and Joe Sewell to be added to the Hall. After the ceremony, Averill also issued a statement, "My disagreements with how the Hall of Fame elections are held, and who is elected, is not based on bitterness that I had to wait 34 years after retirement to receive this honor. But it is based on the fact that statistics alone are not enough to gain a player admittance...Had I been elected after my death, I had made arrangements that my name never be placed in the Hall of Fame."

He made news of a different sort, according to Baseball Digest, in the early 1960s when he was boarding an airplane to fly to a site for an old-timers' game, insisting on bringing his own bat in a gun case. He died in Washington in 1983 at 81 years old.

His son, Earl D. Averill, also played in the majors from 1956 through 1963. He was mainly a catcher but also played left field and a few games at infield.

== See also ==
- List of players with a home run in first major league at-bat
- List of Major League Baseball career home run leaders
- List of Major League Baseball career hits leaders
- List of Major League Baseball career doubles leaders
- List of Major League Baseball career triples leaders
- List of Major League Baseball career runs scored leaders
- List of Major League Baseball career runs batted in leaders
- List of Major League Baseball annual triples leaders
- List of Major League Baseball players to hit for the cycle
- List of athletes on Wheaties boxes

Preceded by Jimmie Foxx	Hitting for the cycle August 17, 1933	Succeeded by Babe Herman
