= Henry Rodríguez (outfielder) =

Dominican baseball player (born 1967)

- Left fielder
- Born: November 8, 1967 (age 58); Santo Domingo, Dominican Republic
- Batted: Left Threw: Left

MLB debut
- July 5, 1992, for the Los Angeles Dodgers

Last MLB appearance
- May 7, 2002, for the Montreal Expos

MLB statistics
- Batting average: .259
- Home runs: 160
- Runs batted in: 523
- Stats at Baseball Reference

Teams
- Los Angeles Dodgers (1992–1995); Montreal Expos (1995–1997); Chicago Cubs (1998–2000); Florida Marlins (2000); New York Yankees (2001); Montreal Expos (2002)

Career highlights and awards
- All-Star (1996)

Henry Anderson Rodríguez Lorenzo (born November 8, 1967) is a Dominican former professional baseball outfielder, who played in Major League Baseball (MLB) for the Montreal Expos, Chicago Cubs, Los Angeles Dodgers, New York Yankees, and Florida Marlins from 1992 to 2002.

Rodríguez was a member of the 1996 National League (NL) All-Star team as a member of the Expos, hitting a career high 36 home runs that year; which was the Expos team record at the time. He was voted the Montreal Expos Player of the Year in 1996.

Rodríguez was a key player on the Cubs 1998 Wild Card winning team, and the addition of his bat into the cleanup slot in the Cub lineup helped give slugger Sammy Sosa, who hit third, an advantage, as Sosa slugged 66 home runs in 1998.

In Montreal, it became a tradition to throw Oh Henry! bars onto the field after a Rodriguez home run. "Oh Henry" was a popular home run call from Expos broadcaster Rodger Brulotte.

In 2005, while playing for the Long Island Ducks of the independent Atlantic League, Rodriguez led the league with a .322 batting average.

Rodríguez's son, Anderson Rodríguez is an outfielder in the Los Angeles Angels organization.
