= List of National League annual slugging percentage leaders =

List of National League Slugging Percentage Leaders

The National League slugging percentage Leader is the Major League Baseball player in the National League who has the highest slugging percentage in a particular season.

In baseball statistics, slugging percentage' (abbreviated SLG) is a measure of the power of a hitter. It is calculated as total bases divided by at bats:

$SLG = \frac{(\mathit{1B}) + (2 \times \mathit{2B}) + (3 \times \mathit{3B}) + (4 \times \mathit{HR})}{AB}$

where AB is the number of at-bats for a given player, and 1B, 2B, 3B, and HR are the number of singles, doubles, triples, and home runs, respectively. Walks are specifically excluded from this calculation.

Currently, a player needs to accrue an average of at least 3.1 plate appearances for each game his team plays in order to qualify for the title. An exception to this qualification rule is that if a player falls short of 3.1 plate appearances per game, but would still have the highest batting average if enough hitless at-bats were added to reach the 3.1 average mark, the player still wins the slugging percentage championship.

The latest example of this exception being employed was in 2007, when Ryan Braun had a .634 slugging percentage, but only 492 plate appearances – 10 short of the 502 necessary. The addition of 10 hitless at-bats would have lowered his slugging percentage to a value that was still better than anyone else in the league, so Braun was the National League slugging percentage champion. A similar situation occurred when Tony Gwynn won the NL batting title in 1996.

Year-by-Year National League Slugging Percentage Leaders

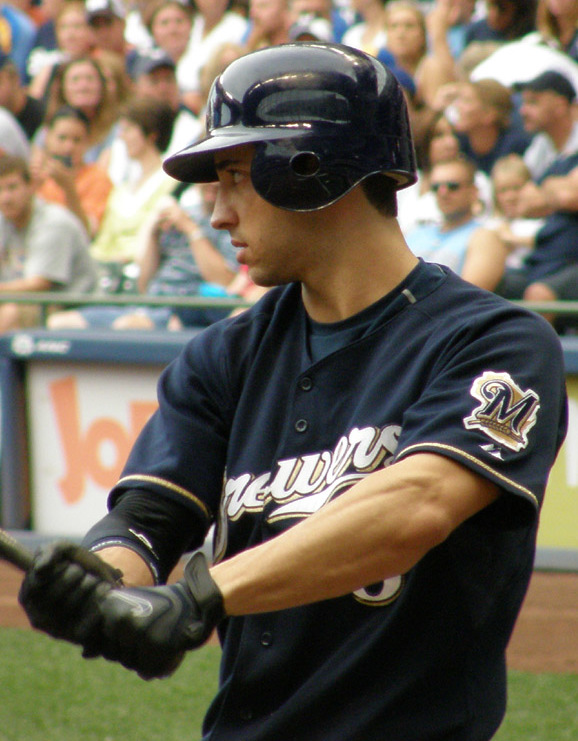
Ryan Braun

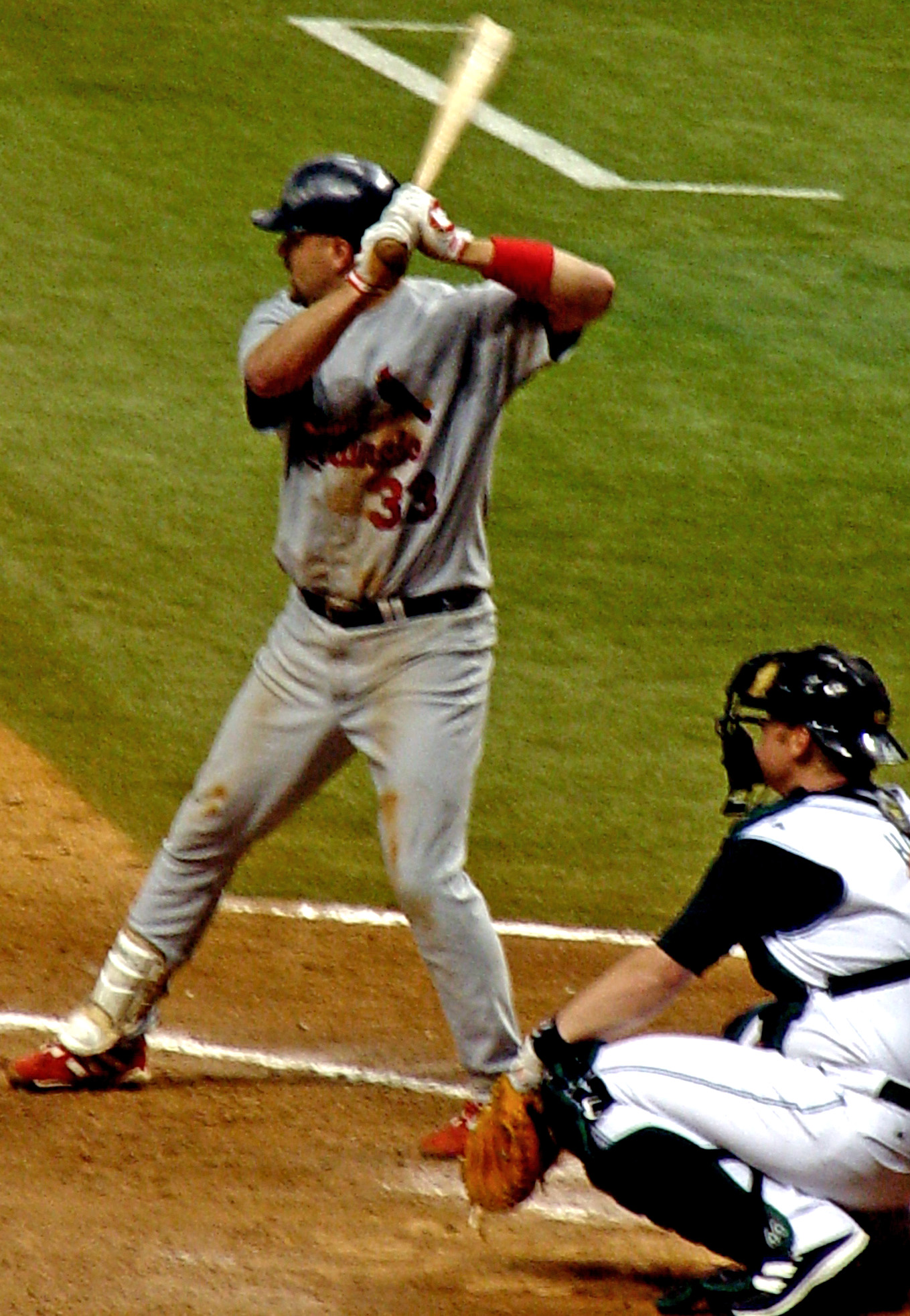
Larry Walker

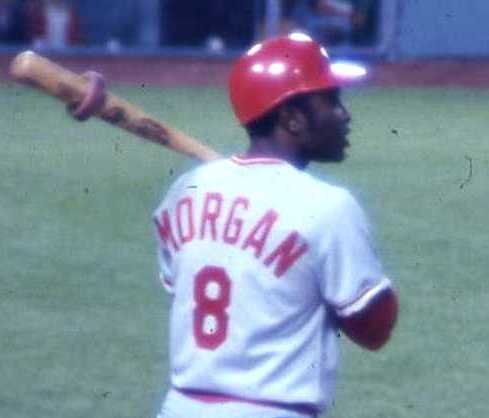
Joe Morgan

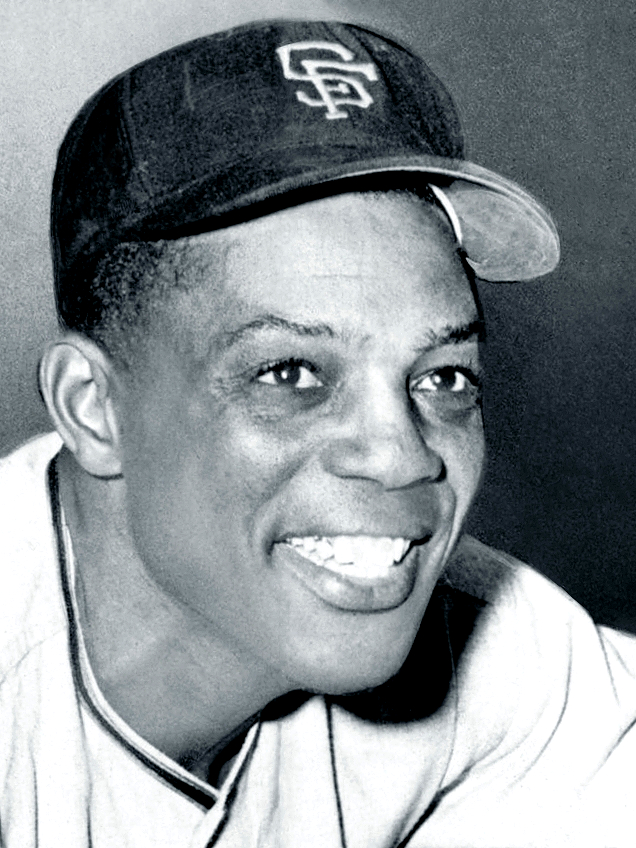
Willie Mays

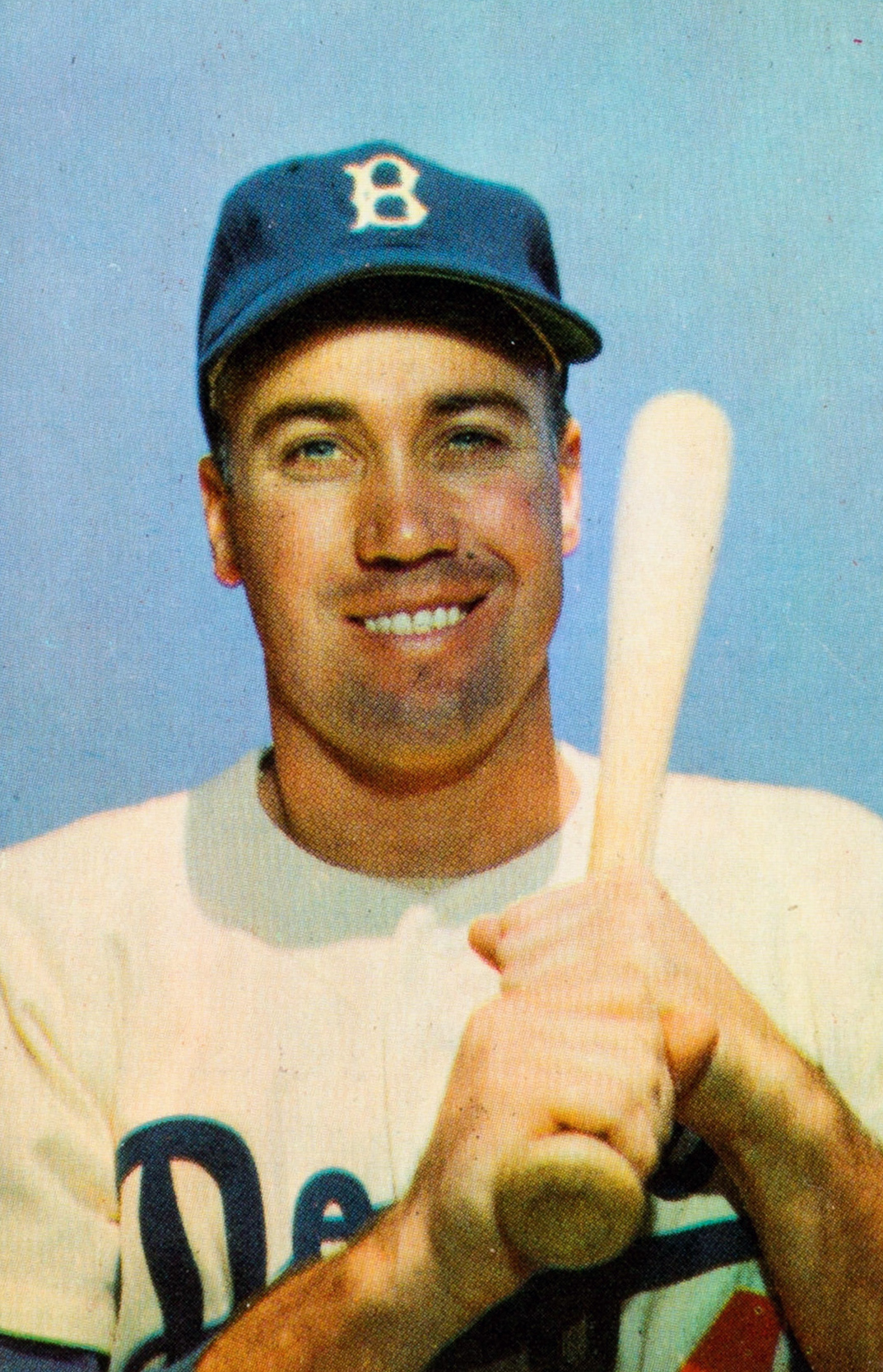
Duke Snider

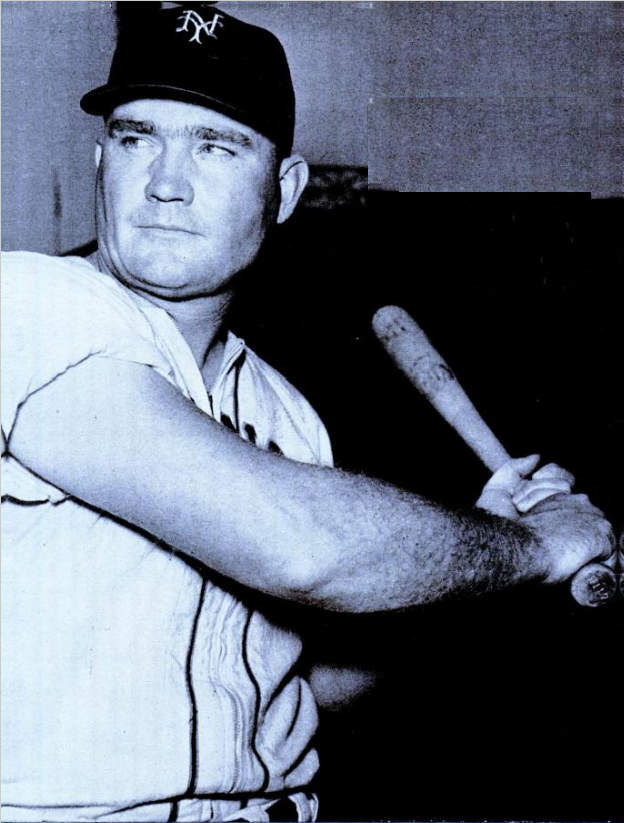
Johnny Mize

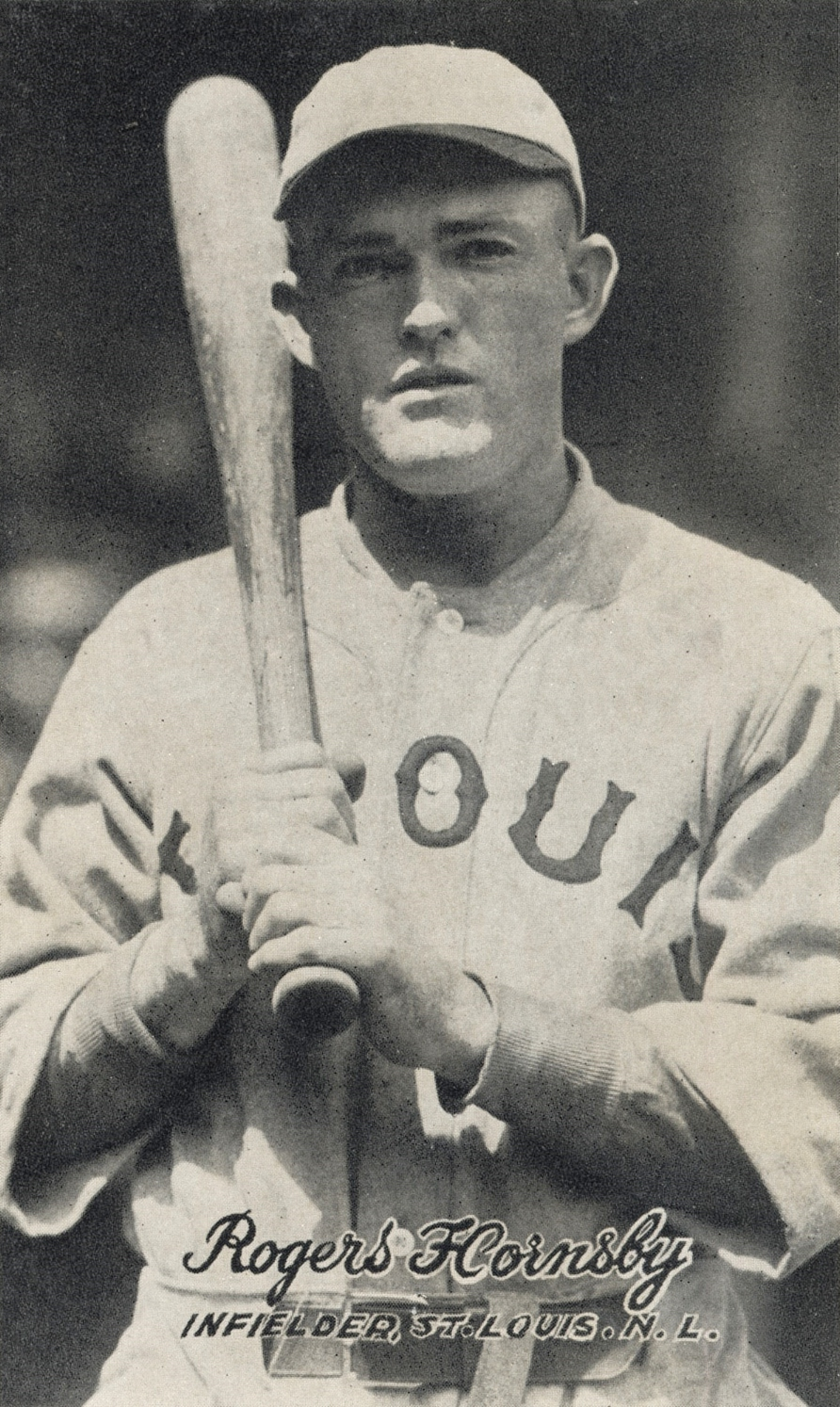
Rogers Hornsby

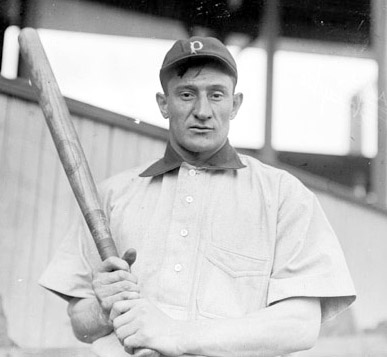
Honus Wagner

- 2024 Shohei Ohtani (LAD) .649
- 2023 Matt Olson (ATL) .604
- 2022 Paul Goldschmidt (STL) .578
- 2021 Bryce Harper (PHI) .615
- 2020 Juan Soto (WSN) .695
- 2019 Christian Yelich (MIL) .671
- 2018 Christian Yelich (MIL) .598
- 2017 Giancarlo Stanton (MIA) .631
- 2016 Daniel Murphy (WSN) .595
- 2015 Bryce Harper (WSN) .649
- 2014 Giancarlo Stanton (MIA) .555
- 2013 Paul Goldschmidt (ARI) .551
- 2012 Giancarlo Stanton (MIA) .608
- 2011 Ryan Braun (MIL) .597
- 2010 Joey Votto (CIN) .600
- 2009 Albert Pujols (STL) .658
- 2008 Albert Pujols (STL) .653
- 2007 Ryan Braun (MIL) **.634
- 2006 Albert Pujols (STL) .671
- 2005 Derrek Lee (CHC) .662
- 2004 Barry Bonds (SFG) .812
- 2003 Barry Bonds (SFG) .749
- 2002 Barry Bonds (SFG) .799
- 2001 Barry Bonds (SFG) .863
- 2000 Todd Helton (COL) .698
- 1999 Larry Walker (COL) .710
- 1998 Mark McGwire (STL) .752
- 1997 Larry Walker (COL) .720
- 1996 Ellis Burks (COL) .639
- 1995 Dante Bichette (COL) .620
- 1994 Jeff Bagwell (HOU) .750
- 1993 Barry Bonds (SFG) .677
- 1992 Barry Bonds (PIT) .624
- 1991 Will Clark (SFG) .536
- 1990 Barry Bonds (PIT) .565
- 1989 Kevin Mitchell (SFG) .635
- 1988 Darryl Strawberry (NYM) .545
- 1987 Jack Clark (STL) .597
- 1986 Mike Schmidt+ (PHI) .547
- 1985 Pedro Guerrero (LAD) .577
- 1984 Dale Murphy (ATL) .547
- 1983 Dale Murphy (ATL) .540
- 1982 Mike Schmidt+ (PHI) .547
- 1981 Mike Schmidt+ (PHI) .644
- 1980 Mike Schmidt+ (PHI) .624
- 1979 Dave Kingman (CHC) .613
- 1978 Dave Parker (PIT) .585
- 1977 George Foster (CIN) .631
- 1976 Joe Morgan+ (CIN) .576
- 1975 Dave Parker (PIT) .541
- 1974 Mike Schmidt+ (PHI) .546
- 1973 Willie Stargell+ (PIT) .646
- 1972 Billy Williams+ (CHC) .606
- 1971 Hank Aaron+ (ATL) .669
- 1970 Willie McCovey+ (SFG) .612
- 1969 Willie McCovey+ (SFG) .656
- 1968 Willie McCovey+ (SFG) .545
- 1967 Hank Aaron+ (ATL) .573
- 1966 Dick Allen (PHI) .632
- 1965 Willie Mays+ (SFG) .645
- 1964 Willie Mays+ (SFG) .607
- 1963 Hank Aaron+ (MLN) .586
- 1962 Frank Robinson+ (CIN) .624
- 1961 Frank Robinson+ (CIN) .611
- 1960 Frank Robinson+ (CIN) .595
- 1959 Hank Aaron+ (MLN) .636
- 1958 Ernie Banks+ (CHC) .614
- 1957 Willie Mays+ (NYG) .626
- 1956 Duke Snider+ (BRO) .598
- 1955 Willie Mays+ (NYG) .659
- 1954 Willie Mays+ (NYG) .667
- 1953 Duke Snider+ (BRO) .627
- 1952 Stan Musial+ (STL) .538
- 1951 Ralph Kiner+ (PIT) .627
- 1950 Stan Musial+ (STL) .596
- 1949 Ralph Kiner+ (PIT) .658
- 1948 Stan Musial+ (STL) .702
- 1947 Ralph Kiner+ (PIT) .639
- 1946 Stan Musial+ (STL) .587
- 1945 Tommy Holmes (BSN) .577
- 1944 Stan Musial+ (STL) .549
- 1943 Stan Musial+ (STL) .562
- 1942 Johnny Mize+ (NYG) .521
- 1941 Pete Reiser (BRO) .558
- 1940 Johnny Mize+ (STL) .636
- 1939 Johnny Mize+ (STL) .626
- 1938 Johnny Mize+ (STL) .614
- 1937 Joe Medwick+ (STL) .641
- 1936 Mel Ott+ (NYG) .588
- 1935 Arky Vaughan+ (PIT).607
- 1934 Ripper Collins (STL) .615
- 1933 Chuck Klein+ (PHI) .602
- 1932 Chuck Klein+ (PHI) .646
- 1931 Chuck Klein+ (PHI) .584
- 1930 Hack Wilson+ (CHC) .723
- 1929 Rogers Hornsby+ (CHC) .679
- 1928 Rogers Hornsby+ (BSN) .632
- 1927 Chick Hafey+ (STL) .590
- 1926 Cy Williams (PHI) .568
- 1925 Rogers Hornsby+ (STL) .756
- 1924 Rogers Hornsby+ (STL) .696
- 1923 Rogers Hornsby+ (STL) .627
- 1922 Rogers Hornsby+ (STL) .722
- 1921 Rogers Hornsby+ (STL) .639
- 1920 Rogers Hornsby+ (STL) .559
- 1919 Hy Myers (BRO) .436
- 1918 Edd Roush+ (CIN) .455
- 1917 Rogers Hornsby+ (STL) .484
- 1916 Zack Wheat+ (BRO) .461
- 1915 Gavvy Cravath (PHI) .510
- 1914 Sherry Magee (PHI) .509
- 1913 Gavvy Cravath (PHI) .568
- 1912 Heinie Zimmerman (CHC) .571
- 1911 Frank Schulte (CHC) .534
- 1910 Sherry Magee (PHI) .507
- 1909 Honus Wagner+ (PIT) .489
- 1908 Honus Wagner+ (PIT) .542
- 1907 Honus Wagner+ (PIT) .513
- 1906 Harry Lumley (BRO) .477
- 1905 Cy Seymour (CIN) .559
- 1904 Honus Wagner+ (PIT) .520
- 1903 Fred Clarke+ (PIT) .532
- 1902 Honus Wagner+ (PIT) .463
- 1901 Jimmy Sheckard (BRO) .534

+ Hall of Famer

A ** by the stat's value indicates the player had fewer than the required number of plate appearances for the SLG title that year. In order to rank the player, the necessary number of hitless at bats were added to the player's season total. The value here is their actual value, and not the value used to rank them.
