= Larry Walker =

Canadian baseball player (born 1966)

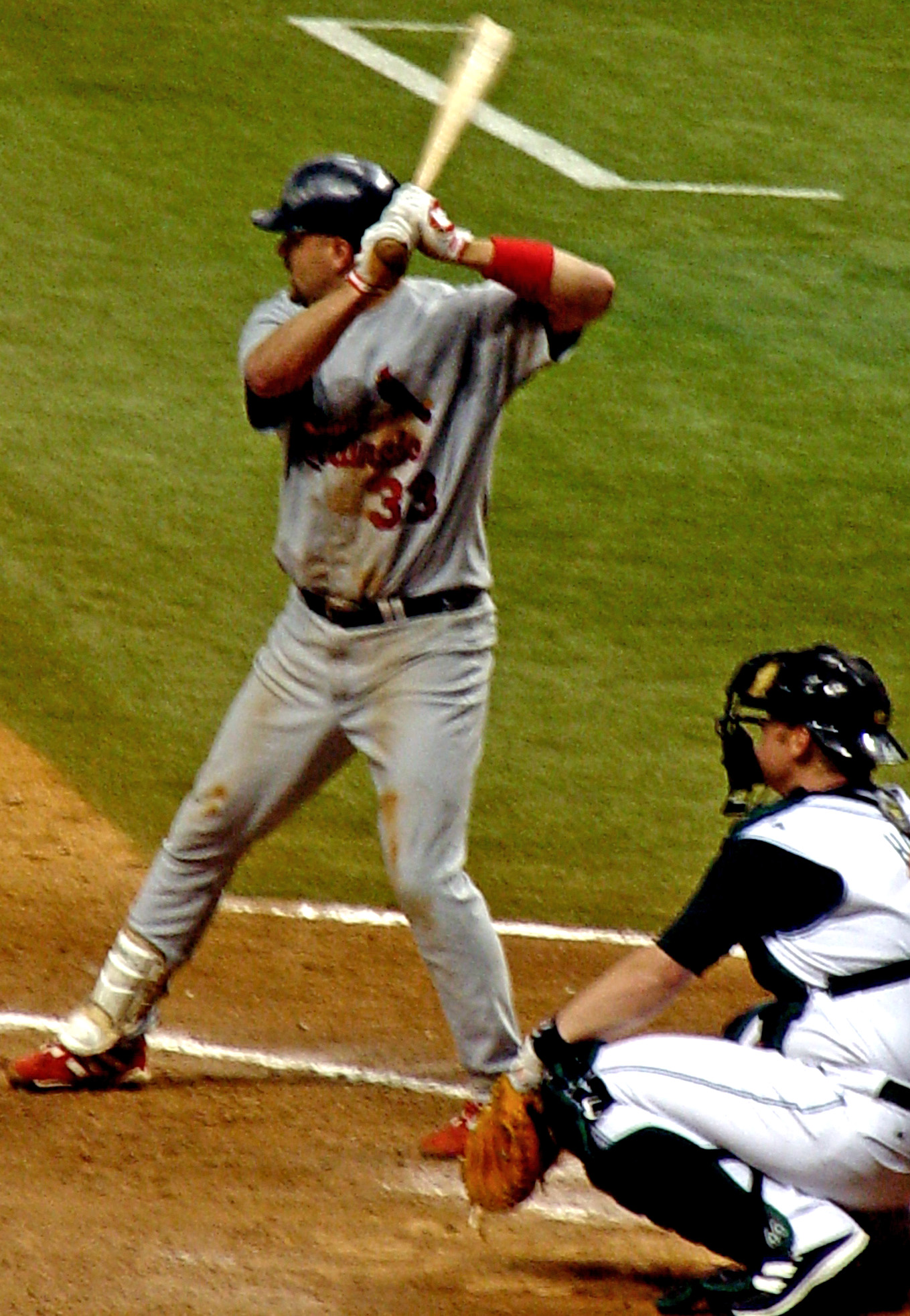
- Walker with the St. Louis Cardinals in 2005
- Right fielder
- Born: December 1, 1966 (age 59); Maple Ridge, British Columbia, Canada
- Batted: Left Threw: Right

MLB debut
- August 16, 1989, for the Montreal Expos

Last MLB appearance
- October 2, 2005, for the St. Louis Cardinals

MLB statistics
- Batting average: .313
- Hits: 2,160
- Home runs: 383
- Runs batted in: 1,311
- Stats at Baseball Reference

Teams
- Montreal Expos (1989–1994); Colorado Rockies (1995–2004); St. Louis Cardinals (2004–2005)

Career highlights and awards
- 5× All-Star (1992, 1997–1999, 2001); NL MVP (1997); 7× Gold Glove Award (1992, 1993, 1997–1999, 2001, 2002); 3× Silver Slugger Award (1992, 1997, 1999); 3× NL batting champion (1998, 1999, 2001); NL home run leader (1997); Colorado Rockies No. 33 retired

Member of the National

Baseball Hall of Fame
- Induction: 2020
- Vote: 76.6% (tenth ballot)

Larry Kenneth Robert Walker (born December 1, 1966) is a Canadian former professional baseball right fielder. During his 17-year Major League Baseball (MLB) career, he played with the Montreal Expos, Colorado Rockies, and St. Louis Cardinals. In 1997, he became the only player in major league history to register both a .700 slugging percentage (SLG) and 30 stolen bases in the same season, on his way to winning the National League (NL) Most Valuable Player Award (MVP). The first player in more than 60 years to record a batting average of .360 in three consecutive seasons from 1997 to 1999, Walker also won three NL batting championships. He was inducted into Canada's Sports Hall of Fame in 2007, and the Canadian Baseball Hall of Fame in the Class of 2009, and was named the 13th-greatest sporting figure from Canada by Sports Illustrated in 1999. In 2020, Walker was elected to the Baseball Hall of Fame.

Widely considered a five-tool player of prodigious athleticism and instincts, Walker hit for both average and power, combined with well-above-average speed, defense and throwing strength and accuracy. He was recognized as the top Canadian athlete in 1998 with the Lou Marsh Trophy. Other honors include five MLB All-Star selections, seven Gold Glove Awards, three Silver Slugger Awards, and nine Tip O'Neill Awards. His career SLG of .565 ranks 12th all time. Walker is one of only 19 hitters in history to accomplish a .300 batting average, .400 on-base percentage (OBP), and .500 SLG with at least 5,000 plate appearances, and one of six whose career began after 1960. Considering advanced metrics, he is one of only three players in history to rank within the top 100 of each of batting runs, base-running runs, and defensive runs saved; the others are Barry Bonds and Willie Mays.

Raised in Maple Ridge, British Columbia, Walker spent his youth playing street hockey with aspirations of becoming a NHL goaltender. That dream never materialized; however, the Expos saw his baseball potential and signed him in 1984. By 1990, Walker became their starting right fielder, propelling them to the majors' best record in 1994 when that year's strike stopped their first serious World Series run. He signed with the Rockies as a free agent following the season, and, during a six-year period starting in 1997, was the major league batting leader three times while finishing second in the NL twice. In 1997, he also led the league in home runs, OBP, and SLG, while joining the 30–30 club, registering 12 outfield assists and leading his position with four double plays turned; he won the NL MVP Award that year. Desiring a trade to a contending team, Walker was sent by the Rockies to St. Louis in the middle of their 105-win season of 2004 where he made his first World Series appearance while tying or setting three Cardinals postseason records. He announced his retirement from playing baseball after game six of the 2005 NL Championship Series.

Following his playing career, Walker has served as a guest instructor for the Cardinals, and, since 2009, has coached the Canadian national team. In that time, Team Canada has competed in three World Baseball Classic (WBC) tournaments, and twice at the Pan American Games, winning consecutive gold medals in 2011 and 2015.

== Early life and amateur career ==
I'm just thrilled to have kids come up to me and tell me my son is their idol. He deserves everything he's got.

— Larry Walker Sr., on Walker's baseball success, per his Canadian Sports Hall of Fame profile

Walker was born on December 1, 1966, in Maple Ridge, a suburb of Greater Vancouver in British Columbia, to Larry Sr., and Mary Walker, both of Scottish descent. Walker had three older brothers. The five men often played together in a fastpitch softball league, frequently all in the same starting lineup. Walker grew up passing much of his free time playing street hockey, especially as part of a group of boys in the backyard and driveway of another boy. In that group was future Hockey Hall of Famer Cam Neely, who became one of Walker's close friends. Walker dreamed of a career in the National Hockey League (NHL) as a goaltender, only casually playing an occasional baseball game during the summer.

Walker played hockey and volleyball at Maple Ridge Secondary School; baseball was not offered. One of his boyhood idols was NHL goalie Billy Smith, who won four consecutive Stanley Cups from 1980−83, during Walker's teenage years. Walker sharpened his skills by blocking shots against Neely. Walker's brother Carey, also a goaltender, was drafted by the Montreal Canadiens in the 12th round of the 1977 NHL draft.

=== Junior hockey ===
At the age of 16, Walker was offered tryouts with Junior A teams in Regina, Saskatchewan, and Kelowna, British Columbia, however, he was cut from both teams, while Herbert made the Regina Pats. Other offers Walker received were from Western Hockey League teams, including Swift Current, which he toured. After seeing substandard conditions there, he decided that he no longer wanted to pursue hockey once he arrived at the rink, and subsequently focused his athletic aspirations on baseball.

=== Baseball ===
The popularity of baseball in Canada during Walker's youth was small compared to the following he would help spawn related to his later success with the Montreal Expos. Previously, Canadian baseball luminaries included Tip O'Neill, the first Canadian to win a Triple Crown in 1887, and Ferguson Jenkins, Canada's first selectee to the American Baseball Hall of Fame in 1991. Walker would help dramatically increase the profile of the sport in a hockey-mad nation. Part of the factor are Canada's short summers, which make it more challenging to play outdoors than in the United States. Walker later said regarding his youth career, "I'd never seen a forkball, never seen a slider. I didn't know they existed. I had never really seen a good curveball. In Canada, as a kid, we'd play 10 baseball games a year. Fifteen, tops. Some pitchers had a thing they'd call a spinner, but nothing like this. Baseball just wasn't big. The weather was against it. Nobody ever played baseball thinking about making the major leagues." He was also unaware of many of the rules, attesting to his lack of experience playing when he turned a professional.

In 1984, Walker played for the Coquitlam Reds of the British Columbia Premier Baseball League. He was selected to join the Canadian team at the 1984 World Youth Championships in Kindersley, Saskatchewan. At that tournament, he caught the eye of Expos scouting director Jim Fanning after hitting a home run with a wooden bat, in contrast to all the other players who were using metal bats. Fanning signed Walker for $1,500 (equivalent to US$4,648 in 2025) as an amateur free agent owing to his relative lack of experience playing organized baseball. At that time, Canadians were not eligible to be selected through the Major League Baseball draft. While the Expos perceived Walker to be very athletic, they decided that he was very raw, and that he did not initially warrant rating as a top prospect.

== Professional career ==
=== Minor leagues ===
Walker attended Expos minor league spring training camp in 1985 and it was clear from the outset that pitching was a complete mystery to him. He swung indiscriminately, expecting every pitch to be a fastball, including at ones that bounced 10 feet in front of, or on, home plate. When the camp ended, there was still about one and a half months remaining until the start of the season, so he returned home, seeking additional preparation. He joined a fast-pitch softball team sponsored by a bowling alley, but this brought little relief. The Expos assigned Walker to the Utica Blue Sox of the New York–Penn League, a Class A Short Season league, for his first season of professional baseball. He played third base and first base. Although he could hit fastballs well, he continued to have difficulties with strike zone judgment and the more sophisticated pitches, finishing with a .223 batting average and two home runs. Manager Ken Brett, who was less preoccupied with fielding a winning team than giving the athletic players the opportunity to experiment, allowed Walker to stay in the lineup as a regular in part because of his willingness to learn. Walker heard that he would be released, but Brett recalled that "he was just so tough," and marveled at his "outstanding athleticism, freakish hand-eye coordination and mental approach;" he also had 12 stolen bases. Expos hitting coach Ralph Rowe successfully lobbied for him to be sent to the Florida Instructional League (FIL). With further tutelage, relentless preparation, and sheer hard work, Walker soon developed into one of the Expos' best young prospects. He continued to make annual off-season returns to FIL in West Palm Beach to calibrate and refine his approach, and eventually made his home there.

In his second professional season in 1986, Walker achieved his breakthrough while playing for two A-level clubs, the Burlington Expos and West Palm Beach Expos. His combined totals in 133 games included a .288 average, .397 on-base percentage (OBP), .602 slugging percentage (SLG), 87 runs scored, 19 doubles, 11 triples, 33 home runs, 90 runs batted in (RBI) and 18 stolen bases. Walker caught the eye of his fellow Canadians, and, as a 19-year-old minor leaguer, had acquired an entourage of Canadian reporters. "I know now I can hit the ball. I have a lot of confidence even though I still strike out a lot. I swing at too many bad pitches," he contemplated. Asserted West Palm Beach manager Felipe Alou, "If he keeps improving the way he has the last 12 months, there's no telling what he could do. You have a kid with his kind of potential, they don't last long in the minor leagues." Meanwhile, the club clinched the Florida State League South division, winning by two games over the Fort Lauderdale Yankees.

After promotion to Jacksonville Expos of the Southern League in 1987, Walker totaled a .287 average, .383 OBP, .534 SLG, 91 runs, 26 home runs, 24 stolen bases and three times caught stealing. He won his first Tip O'Neill Award that year as the top Canadian baseball player. He missed the 1988 season after undergoing reconstructive knee surgery for an injury while playing in the Mexican Pacific League. The Expos moved him up to Indianapolis Indians of the Triple-A International League in 1989. There, he played in 114 games and batted .270 with 68 runs scored, 12 home runs, 36 stolen bases and six times caught stealing.

=== Montreal Expos ===
==== Major league debut (1989) ====
Walker made his debut with the Montreal Expos on August 16, 1989. He walked twice in the game while hitting a single in his first at bat, off Mike LaCoss of the San Francisco Giants. He struggled in his debut, batting .170 with a .264 OBP and .170 SLG in 56 plate appearances. Montreal fans gave him the nickname "Booger."

==== Early major league career (1990−1992) ====
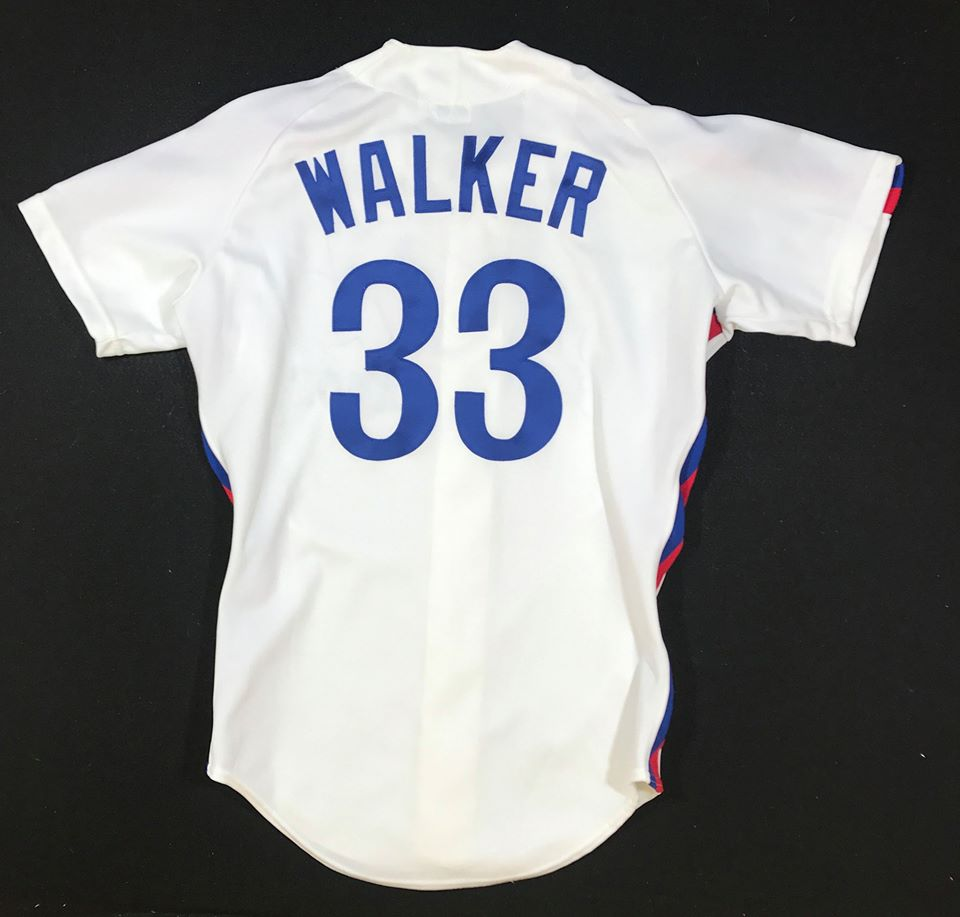
1989−1991 Montreal Expos #33 Larry Walker home jersey

Ranked No. 42 on Baseball America's list of top prospects in advance of the 1990 season, Walker became the Expos' regular right fielder following Hubie Brooks' departure via free agency, patrolling an outfield which featured Tim Raines and Marquis Grissom, both accomplished base stealers and hitters. Walker batted .241/.326 /.434 for a 112 OPS+ in his first full season. He also hit 19 home runs with 21 stolen bases and produced 3.4 Wins Above Replacement (WAR). He placed seventh in the National League (NL) Rookie of the Year balloting. As the top native Canadian to ever play for the Expos, Walker became a role model for young Canadian baseball players.

Over the next four seasons, Walker hit a combined .293/.366/.501 for a 134 OPS+, with an average of 20 home runs, 19 stolen bases, excellent defense (+10 runs per year) and 4.2 WAR. He became another in the succession of Montreal's great outfielders. He appeared in 133 to 143 games per season, spending significant time on the disabled list (DL) in 1991 and 1993 while playing on Olympic Stadium's notorious artificial turf, a product perceived to create excessive stress on knees, accelerating injuries to players like former Expos star outfielder Andre Dawson. In 1991, Walker appeared in 39 games at first base, including Dennis Martínez's perfect game on July 28, a 2−0 victory over the Los Angeles Dodgers. In that game, Walker hit the only RBI, driving in Dave Martinez on a triple, and scored the second run on an error. He was involved in 17 of 27 outs: 16 putouts and one assist.

In late May 1992, the Expos made Alou manager at the major league level, touching off a period of heightened success lasting the rest of Walker's time in Montreal. On July 4 against the San Diego Padres, he fielded a ground ball to right field and threw out speedy shortstop Tony Fernández at first base. Walker was named to his first All-Star Game, debuting as a pinch hitter in the fourth inning for Greg Maddux and hitting a single. Walker was also selected to his first Home Run Derby, hitting four home runs. In 1992, Walker batted .301/.353/.506 and rated 10 runs above average while fielding, with 16 outfield assists, for a total value of 5.4 WAR. He won his first Gold Glove and Silver Slugger awards and became the only Canadian to win the Expos Player of the Year award. Walker received consideration for the Most Valuable Player Award (MVP) for the first time in 1992, finishing fifth in the NL.

==== 1993−94 seasons ====
The 1993 Expos reached a rare watermark, winning 94 games. A core of young talent propelled the club, including Grissom and a rising Moisés Alou (son of manager Felipe) complementing Walker in the outfield, starters Ken Hill and Jeff Fassero, and relievers John Wetteland and Mel Rojas. An improbable finish to the regular season including a record of 30−9 catapulted Montreal to a second-place standing with a 94−68 record, just shy of the club-record 95 wins set in 1979. Excitement in Canada began to crescendo over the prospect of the first-ever all-Canadian World Series, as the Toronto Blue Jays were defending champions in 1993, and repeated that October. Walker batted .265 with 22 home runs and 86 RBI, setting then-career highs with 80 walks, 20 intentional walks, 29 stolen bases, and .371 OBP. He won his second Gold Glove Award.

Before the start of the 1994 season, the Expos, seeking to replace departed ace Dennis Martínez in the starting rotation, acquired a young reliever in Pedro Martínez, who the Los Angeles Dodgers had cast doubt over his potential as starter and pitched him out of the bullpen. One amusing moment happened on April 24 while playing the Dodgers in Los Angeles and Martínez starting. With one out in the third inning, Walker caught a Mike Piazza fly ball and innocently handed it to a young fan, six-year-old Sebastian Napier, thinking it was the third out of the inning. He then quickly noticed that José Offerman, already on base, was running at full speed. Walker managed to retrieve the ball from Napier and throw it back in, but Offerman was held at third base because the ball had gone out of play. Embarrassed, Walker admitted that he "told the little kid that maybe next time I'll give him a ball when there are three outs instead of two. Everybody around him was laughing." Where Offerman was stationed made little difference, as Tim Wallach homered on the next pitch from Martínez for two runs. True to his word, when the Expos assumed the field in the bottom half of the fourth inning, Walker gave Napier a signed ball, inducing a standing ovation.

From June 1 forward, Montreal transformed into the dominant club in the NL, going 46−18 until the players' strike halted the season on August 11. In turn, they produced the most successful season in franchise history in terms of winning percentage (.649) with a major league-best 74−40 record. Walker was suspended four games starting June 24 for inciting a bench-clearing brawl by charging the mound in a game against Pittsburgh. He paced for new levels production in spite of a shoulder injury in late June that confined him to first base for the remainder of the season. He easily accelerated past his previous career highs set in 1992 with a .322 batting average, .394 OBP, and .587 SLG, including what could have been his first 100-RBI year. He finished with 86 RBI, 151 OPS+, and a league-leading 44 doubles; the latter two figures were also new career-highs. He was sixth in the league in RBI, seventh in WAR (4.7), offensive win % (.739) and OPS+, and eighth in batting and SLG. He placed 11th in the NL MVP voting.

Perhaps the most remarkable aspect of the Expos' transcendent season was that they did so with the second-lowest payroll in baseball. However, as the team lost millions of dollars in revenue from 29 canceled home games and playoffs, general manager Kevin Malone was given orders to drastically reduce payroll. The club dealt away their young stars and did not offer Walker salary arbitration. As such, he was granted free agency.

=== Colorado Rockies ===
Walker signed a four-year contract with the Colorado Rockies worth nearly $22.5 million USD (equivalent to $47,500,000 in 2025), the largest agreement since the strike. The average annual value equated to more than $5.6 million ($11.8 million today), up from the $4 million ($8.7 million today) the Expos had paid him the year prior. From Olympic Stadium to Coors Field, Walker transitioned into the most benevolent hitting environment since World War II. Nonetheless, even after mathematically adjusting for stadium and altitude advantages, his production during his Rockies years consistently rivaled other hitters whose accomplishments came in settings of greater difficulty.

==== 1995−96 seasons ====
In his Rockies debut and inaugural game of Coors Field on April 26 against the New York Mets, Walker doubled three times, including one that tied the score with two outs in the ninth resulting in an 11−9 extra innings win. On May 7, 1995, he hit his 100th career home run off Hideo Nomo of Los Angeles.

Walker attained new career-highs with 36 home runs and 101 RBI, reaching both 30 home runs and 100 RBI for the first time in his career, in spite of missing 13 games of a season shortened by the strike that had begun the year before. His rate numbers were .306/.381/.607, and as the average club scored 5.4 runs per game, his OPS+ fell about 20 percent from the year before to 131. Walker ranked second in the NL in home runs (tied with Sammy Sosa), slugging, extra base hits (72), total bases (300), at bats per home run (13.7) and hits by pitch (14), third in OPS (.988), and seventh in runs scored (96) and RBI. He placed seventh in the NL MVP voting, his second time in the top ten.

One of a quartet of Rockies players who became known as The Blake Street Bombers, Walker, Dante Bichette, Vinny Castilla and former Expos teammate Andrés Galarraga each contributed at least 30 home runs in 1995. The Rockies simultaneously won the first-ever NL wild card berth under the new postseason format and first playoff appearance in franchise history in just their third season of play. Walker collected three hits in 14 at bats in the NL Division Series (NLDS) versus the Atlanta Braves. He hit his first career postseason home run off Tom Glavine in the sixth inning of a 7−4 game two loss. The Braves defeated the Rockies in four games.

Walker primarily played center field in 1996 (54 out of 83 games) in a season cut short by injury. On May 21 against the Pittsburgh Pirates, he doubled, tripled, and hit a pair of two-run home runs to drive in a career-best six runs in a 12–10 win. He set a club record with 13 total bases in a game. The next day, also against the Pirates, he set an MLB record with six consecutive extra base hits. On May 26, he won his first MLB Player of the Week Award. He missed more than two months of the 1996 season due to a fractured clavicle that occurred in a collision with an outfield fence. He hit .393 at Coors Field and .142 on the road.

==== Most Valuable Player Award (1997) ====
The Rockies commenced the 1997 season on the road, and thus Walker started a reversal of his poor fortunes away from Coors. He hit two home runs in the season-opening series against the Reds in Cincinnati, and, on April 5, hit three more in Montreal, his first career three-home-run game. The second landed near a home-made sign reading "Boogerville." After the third, fans cheered Walker for the hat-trick in recognition of his former dream of playing hockey professionally. He hit .440 with six home runs in 25 at bats in his first week, winning the NL Player of the Week Award for the second time. He ended April batting .456 with 41 hits, 29 runs scored, 11 home runs, 29 RBI, 7 stolen bases, a .538 OBP, and .911 SLG. He set major league records for March–April for both OPS (later surpassed by Barry Bonds in 2004) and runs scored (later surpassed by Bryce Harper in 2017). Walker won his first NL Player of the Month award.

Walker sat out an interleague game on June 12 versus the Seattle Mariners. Former Expos teammate Randy Johnson, a left-handed pitcher standing 6 feet 10 inches (2.08 m) and one of the most intimidating players in sports history, was scheduled as the starter. "I faced Randy one time in spring training and he almost killed me," Walker explained of the rationale. He collected his 1,000th career hit and 108th of the season on June 20 against Andy Ashby of San Diego.

However, the decision to not bat against Johnson instigated a debacle as one of the indelible moments of Walker's career one month later in the All-Star Game. This time, Walker faced Johnson, who theatrically threw over his head. Ever adaptable, Walker placed his batting helmet backwards and switched sides in the batters' box to stand right-handed for one pitch. He ended the at bat by drawing a walk. The incident momentarily drew mirth and laughter from players in both dugouts, fans and announcers, and comparisons to Johnson pitching against John Kruk in the 1993 All-Star Game, in which he also threw over his head. In spite of garnering a reputation of avoiding Johnson, Walker batted .393 (11 hits in 28 at bats) against him in his career, nearly double the rate of all left-handed batters at .199.

During the All-Star break, Walker participated in the Home Run Derby, placing second with 19 home runs. Both he and Tony Gwynn of the Padres, also a selectee that year's All-Star Game, were batting near .400, and right fielders for teams in the NL West division. They were jointly interviewed, as batting .400 is one of the most difficult achievements in all of sports. Asked just how challenging it is, Gwynn, known to be a very studious hitter, elaborated with what he later termed a "complete dissertation." Walker responded, "I don't know anything about that stuff. I just hit the ball." While neither player wound up achieving the statistic over any full season, Gwynn won that year's NL batting championship and Walker finished second.

Continuing his remarkable season, Walker was batting .402 as late as July 17. On September 12, Walker was batting a league-leading .371 with 43 home runs; no NL player had ever simultaneously marshaled those totals. He then experienced another power surge, hitting home runs in four consecutive games – a total of five in that span – including the 199th and 200th of his career in San Diego on September 17. He injured his right elbow while swinging at the pitch that was thrown just prior to his 49th home run during the Rockies' 160th game, forcing him out of the final two games. In spite of Walker's magnificent season, the Rockies were unable to capitalize, missing the playoffs with an 83–79 record.

Walker's 1997 was a career season, when he hit .366 with 49 home runs, 130 RBI, 208 hits, 143 runs scored, 33 stolen bases, .720 slugging percentage, 1.172 OPS, 409 total bases and 9.8 WAR. He won the NL MVP Award, thus becoming the first Canadian player to win the MVP. The home run and stolen base totals placed him in the 30–30 club. He became and remains the only player to have reached at least 30 stolen bases and a slugging percentage of .700 in the same season, the second with at least 45 home runs and 30 stolen bases, and the fifth with 40−30. The 9.8 WAR produced is tied for the 67th-highest single-season total among position players in MLB history, per Baseball Reference. Walker's production slotted within four hits and 10 RBI of winning the first batting Triple Crown in 60 years. He led the major leagues in WAR, slugging, OPS, total bases, runs created (187), adjusted batting runs (71), adjusted batting wins (6.7), extra base hits (99), and offensive win % (.857); and the NL in on-base percentage (.452), and at bats per home run (11.6).

Also, Walker's 409 total bases were the most in an NL season since Stan Musial gained 429 in 1948, and is tied with Lou Gehrig and Rogers Hornsby for the 18th-highest in MLB history. Walker's season marked the 23rd occasion in MLB history a batter reached 400 total bases and the first time in the NL since Hank Aaron's 400 in 1959. Combined with 12 outfield assists, and a league-leading of both a .992 fielding percentage and four double plays turned, Walker's 1997 season remains one of the finest all-around performances in recent baseball history. Further, he won a series of other awards, including the Players Choice Award for NL Outstanding Player, the Baseball Digest Player of the Year Award, his seventh Tip O'Neill Award, third Gold Glove, second Silver Slugger, and first Rockies Player of the Year Award. In honor of Canada's 150th anniversary of Confederation on July 1, 2017, The Sports Network named Walker's achievement of the MVP award among the nation's most iconic sports moments.

The 49 home runs set a single-season club record for Colorado. Walker's production held up well on the road, including nine more home runs than at Coors Field: .346 average, 29 home runs and 62 RBI in 75 games. Other single-season franchise records Walker set in 1997 were WAR, slugging percentage, OPS, runs scored, total bases, adjusted OPS+, offensive win percentage, and at bats per home run.

==== First batting title (1998) ====
Although he rested the right elbow in the off-season, Walker aggravated the injury while playing golf the following January. The elbow soreness kept him at one home run through April of the 1998 season. He produced a season-high 20-game hitting streak from May 4−25, and the second-longest in the NL, batting .342 in that span, which was actually worse than his average at season's end. In that streak, Walker hit a pinch-hit grand slam on May 6 off Jerry Spradlin of the Philadelphia Philles. The Rockies placed Walker on the DL for two weeks in June due to the elbow soreness, and he managed to hit .331 through the first half of the season. Walker started in the All-Star Game for the second consecutive season, playing center field and batting seventh. He drew a walk and scored a run.

One of the most amazing things I've seen Larry accomplish, was during those two seasons after '97, when, hurt as he was, he hit for a high average. He had to take daily inventory of what was going good and come up with a stroke that would work within the parameters of his health. It was never dramatic–a layman's eye would never notice. But he'd raise his hands on the bat or open his stance, just to have a stroke that was pain-free. It was different every night for two years.

— former Rockies manager and hitting coach Clint Hurdle

Immediately following the All-Star break, Walker collected six hits in his first 32 at bats (.188), dropping his average to .314, its lowest since April 5. During a seven-game homestand spanning July 23−28, he produced 15 hits in 27 at bats (.556) with three doubles, two triples, four home runs and nine RBI, raising his average from .319 to .340. He surged from tenth to second place for the batting crown. From August 19 to the end of the season, he hit .440 (78-for-177). He endured back spasms toward the end of the season, starting in nine of the team's final 17 games.

Walker produced a .402 second-half batting average. After 1997, he never reached 500 at bats again as various injuries cut short each season. With a .363 batting average, he became the first Canadian-born player to win a major league batting title in the 20th century, the first to do so in the NL,^{[a]} and broke Gwynn's streak of four consecutive NL batting championships.

Walker won the prestigious Lou Marsh Trophy in 1998 as Canadian athlete of the year, one year after finishing runner-up to Formula One champion Jacques Villeneuve, of which he remarked at the time that he lost "to a car." Walker also attained the Lionel Conacher Award as the top male Canadian athlete, the ESPY Award for Best Major League Player, and a Tip O'Neill Award. He also received his fourth Gold Glove.

==== 1999 season ====
Plagued by injuries for the last several years of his career, Walker nevertheless continued to produce. He missed the first week of the 1999 season with a strained rib cage. On April 28, he hit three home runs against the St. Louis Cardinals for his second career three home run game while contributing eight RBI in a 9–7 win. Walker hit safely in 21 consecutive games from April 25−May 19, making that the second occasion since 1987 a reigning batting champion had achieved a hit streak of at least 20 games. On May 19, Walker collected four hits versus the Cincinnati Reds to raise his season average to .431, but the Rockies were on the losing end of a 24−12 final, tied for the fourth-highest run-scoring output in MLB history. For the month of May, Walker batted .392, .647 slugging, and 40 hits in 102 at bats.

From June 18−23, Walker tied Bichette's club record by homering in five consecutive games. The following day, Walker tied another club record, held by Galarraga, with his sixth consecutive multi-hit game. In June, Walker played in 25 games, and batted .385, .813 SLG, 10 home runs, 30 RBI, 25 scored, 35 hits, 10 walks, and nine strikeouts. On July 8, Walker hit his 250th career home run versus Chan Ho Park of the Dodgers. Walker batted .326 in July with 15 walks and 10 home runs.

Carrying a .382 first-half average, Walker had batted .390 (189 hits in 484 at bats) from the 1998 All-Star break to the same point in 1999, the equivalent of a full season. He was named to his third consecutive All-Star team. Played at Fenway Park in Boston, he started in right field and batted second. He was one of the strikeout victims of former Expos teammate Pedro Martínez, who became the first to strike out the first three batters in an All-Star Game. In the July 19 contest versus the Oakland Athletics, Walker became the second player to homer into the plaza reserve seating of one of the upper decks in the Oakland Coliseum, following Mark McGwire, who had done so three seasons earlier. On July 27, Walker recorded his 100th and 101st career outfield assists. He hit the game-winning home run August 18 versus John Rocker of Atlanta for his 1,400th career hit. Walker closed his season by hitting safely in 12 consecutive starts, including multiple hits in the final six. Limited to 15 games and 49 plate appearances in September, Walker batted .513 with 20 hits in 39 at bats, 10 runs scored, five doubles, four home runs, 13 RBI, nine walks and two strikeouts.

For the season, Walker batted .379 − setting a Rockies record and the fourth-highest since Ted Williams hit .406 in 1941 − while leading the major leagues in batting for a second time. Walker also led the major leagues in offensive win % (.838), on-base percentage (.458), slugging percentage (.710), and OPS (1.168). Sometimes referred to as the "Slash Stat Triple Crown," he became the seventh player within the previous 60 years to lead the league in each of average, OBP and SLG in the same season, and first since George Brett in 1980. The last NL player to lead the majors in each of the three slash stat categories was Musial in 1943. Walker also hit 37 home runs and 115 RBI in just 438 at bats, stole 11 bases in 15 attempts, and registered 12 outfield assists.

Per the Elias Sports Bureau (ESB), Walker's .461 average at Coors is the highest home batting average since ESB began tracking home/road splits in 1974, and 43 points higher than any other player's in that span. In 66 games at Coors, Walker also hit .531 OBP, .879 SLG, 26 home runs, 70 RBI, 107 hits, 72 runs, nine stolen bases, 31 walks, and 17 strikeouts in 273 plate appearances. On the road, he batted .286, .894 OPS, 11 home runs and 35 strikeouts. He won his fifth Gold Glove and was selected as Rockies Player of the Year for the second time. He placed 10th in the NL MVP balloting. Following the season, he underwent knee surgery.

Walker produced 10.8 WAR combined in 1998−99 while missing at least 30 games in both seasons, and from 1997 to 1999, he hit .314/.410/.592 ... away from Coors Field. His aggregate batting average at .369 in that same time, he became the first player since Al Simmons from 1929–31 to hit at least .360 in each of three consecutive seasons. Walker signed a six-year, $75 million ($145 million today) contract extension after the 1999 season. He was named as the ninth top male athlete of Canada's Athletes of the 20th Century list compiled in 1999, trailing only Ferguson Jenkins (number seven) among baseball players. Sports Illustrated listed Walker as the 13th greatest sporting figure in Canadian history in 1999.

==== 2000−01 seasons ====
While missing a major portion of 2000 with a stress fracture in the right elbow, Walker spent two stints on the DL. He recorded an outfield fielder's choice on April 16 versus St. Louis, leading to a forceout at second base. On April 19 versus the Arizona Diamondbacks, he collected his 1,448th career hit to pass Jeff Heath as the major's all-time hits leader for Canadian-born players. Walker completed his longest hitting streak of the season, at eight games, from April 21−May 1. In that time, he batted .471 (16-for-34) with three home runs and nine RBI. On May 13, the team received diagnostic results revealing he had a stress reaction irritation in his right elbow, and placed him on the DL, in which he missed 23 games. To that point, he was batting .347.

Walker returned from the DL notably weakened, batting .286 over his final 57 games of the season. He homered to drive in his 888th career run on July 1 versus the Oakland Athletics, passing Heath for the all-time lead among Canadian-born players. He also collected his 1,500th career hit in that game. On the August 10−17 road trip, he collected five outfield assists. On September 8, he had surgery on the elbow after it was revealed to be troubled with soreness. Walker appeared in 87 games and batted .309 with nine home runs and 51 RBI. He led the club with 10 outfield assists, eight from right field and two from left field. He ended the season as Canada's all-time leader in hits, doubles, home runs, RBI, and runs scored in the major leagues. First baseman Todd Helton, Walker's teammate on the Rockies from 1998 until his trade to the Cardinals in 2004, won the MLB Slash Stat Triple Crown in 2000, making them the first teammates in history to accomplish the feat in consecutive years. It also gave the Rockies four consecutive MLB batting champions in 1998−2001. Helton eventually succeeded Walker as the Rockies' career franchise leader in a number of statistical categories.

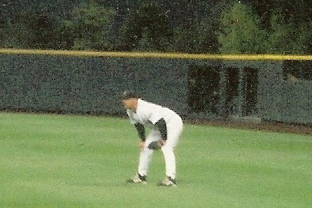
Walker in the outfield at Coors Field in 2001

Prior the 2001 season, Walker committed to a new fitness regimen, including using a personal trainer. He displayed restored health in his right arm on Opening Day, throwing out Fernando Viña of the Cardinals at home plate. Walker opened the season with a 10-game hit streak, from April 4−13, batting .425 with six home runs and 16 RBI. From April 17 to May 23, Walker safely reached base in 31 consecutive games. He batted .375, 11 home runs, 30 RBI during the month of April, becoming the first player in NL history to hit at least 11 home runs in the month of April twice. On May 22, he swiped his 200th career base. He scored his 1,000th career run on June 3 versus San Francisco.

Walker was selected to play in the 2001 All-Star Game, starting as the designated hitter and batting fifth. On August 5, he hit his 300th career home run, coming against the Pittsburgh Pirates in a 5−4 loss. He hit his 204th home run for Colorado on August, passing Castilla for the franchise record. On September 5, he took the lead for good for the batting title from former Expos teammate Moisés Alou. By scoring five runs on September 24 versus San Diego, Walker tied his career-high and the Rockies franchise record.

On the season, Walker tied Ichiro Suzuki for the major league lead in batting at .350 for his third batting title, with 38 homers and 123 RBI in 497 at bats. He did not reach his personal goal of 150 games, but did play in 142 and managed 601 plate appearances, his highest totals since 1997. Also he finished in the top ten in numerous other categories, including second in OBP (.449), third in offensive win % (.831), fifth in SLG (.663), sixth in OPS (1.111), adjusted OPS+ (160), at bats per home run (13.1), and WAR (7.8), and ninth in home runs. He led the majors with a .406 home batting average and in left-hander versus left-hander batting average at .378. He won another Gold Glove that year.

==== 2002−2004 seasons ====
The Rockies struggled to play well in 2002, including a franchise-worst 6−16 start, and ended the season 25 games out of first place. Walker played his 1,532nd game on April 6, surpassing Terry Puhl for most games played by a Canadian-born player in MLB history. Walker's 74th outfield assist with Colorado on May 23 gave him the franchise record, passing Bichette. Walker raised his average from .310 to a season-high .368 in June and July. His June totals included .410, seven doubles, seven home runs and 21 RBI. He hit safely in 20 of 24 games. In July, he was the NL Player of the Month for the second time, batting .438/.505./742, five home runs, and 17 RBI. He became the first player since Paul O'Neill in April and May of 1994 to hit at least .400 in successive months.

Overall, Walker batted .338 in 2002, second in the NL to Bonds' .370 average, and reached 100 RBI for the second consecutive year. Walker also hit 26 home runs and led the team with 40 doubles. He played in 136 games, and hit for a .421 OBP and .602 SLG. He won his seventh Gold Glove Award and was 20th in the MVP voting. His .452 average in interleague play led the major leagues. Throughout his age-36 season of 2003, Walker battled knee, shoulder, hamstring, groin and hip ailments. The knee injury occurred in a collision with Preston Wilson on August 2. In spite of all the injuries, Walker never missed more than three consecutive games and made 143 appearances. He hit 16 home runs and 79 RBI while batting .284, just the second time since 1993 his average had slipped below .300. He drew a career-high 98 bases on balls, resulting in a .422 on-base percentage, the seventh time in his career he reached .400. He was fifth in the NL in OBP, sixth in IBB (16), eighth in BB, and ninth in HBP (11). Commented manager Don Baylor, "Even with the injuries and the lack of numbers from what they used to be in the past, Larry is still pitched to very carefully and fearfully throughout the league. He's played beaten up and bruised." Walker underwent surgery to repair the labrum in the left shoulder and meniscus in the right knee following the season.

A groin strain caused Walker to miss the first 68 games, or two and one-half months, of the 2004 season. His first three home runs of the season came on June 25, 2004, versus the Cleveland Indians, including one off José Jiménez which won the game in the 10th inning for a 10−8 margin. Walker totaled four hits and five RBI on the day, and it was his third career three-home run game. He reached 2,000 career hits on June 30, 2004, becoming the 234th player in major league history to do so. Having already achieved 400 doubles, 300 home runs, 1,000 runs scored, and 1,000 RBI, Walker became the 40th player to reach all five totals. The milestone hit was a double off Ben Sheets in the fourth inning versus the Milwaukee Brewers. Through that point, Walker was the Rockies' career leader in 12 categories.

With the Rockies struggling to make the playoffs—which they had not accomplished since his first year in Colorado in 1995—Walker indicated a desire to be traded to a contender. The Texas Rangers agreed to send to the Rockies two of their prospects then-minor leaguer Ian Kinsler and prospect right-hander Erik Thompson in exchange for Walker in July, but he vetoed the trade.

=== St. Louis Cardinals ===
==== World Series appearance (2004) ====
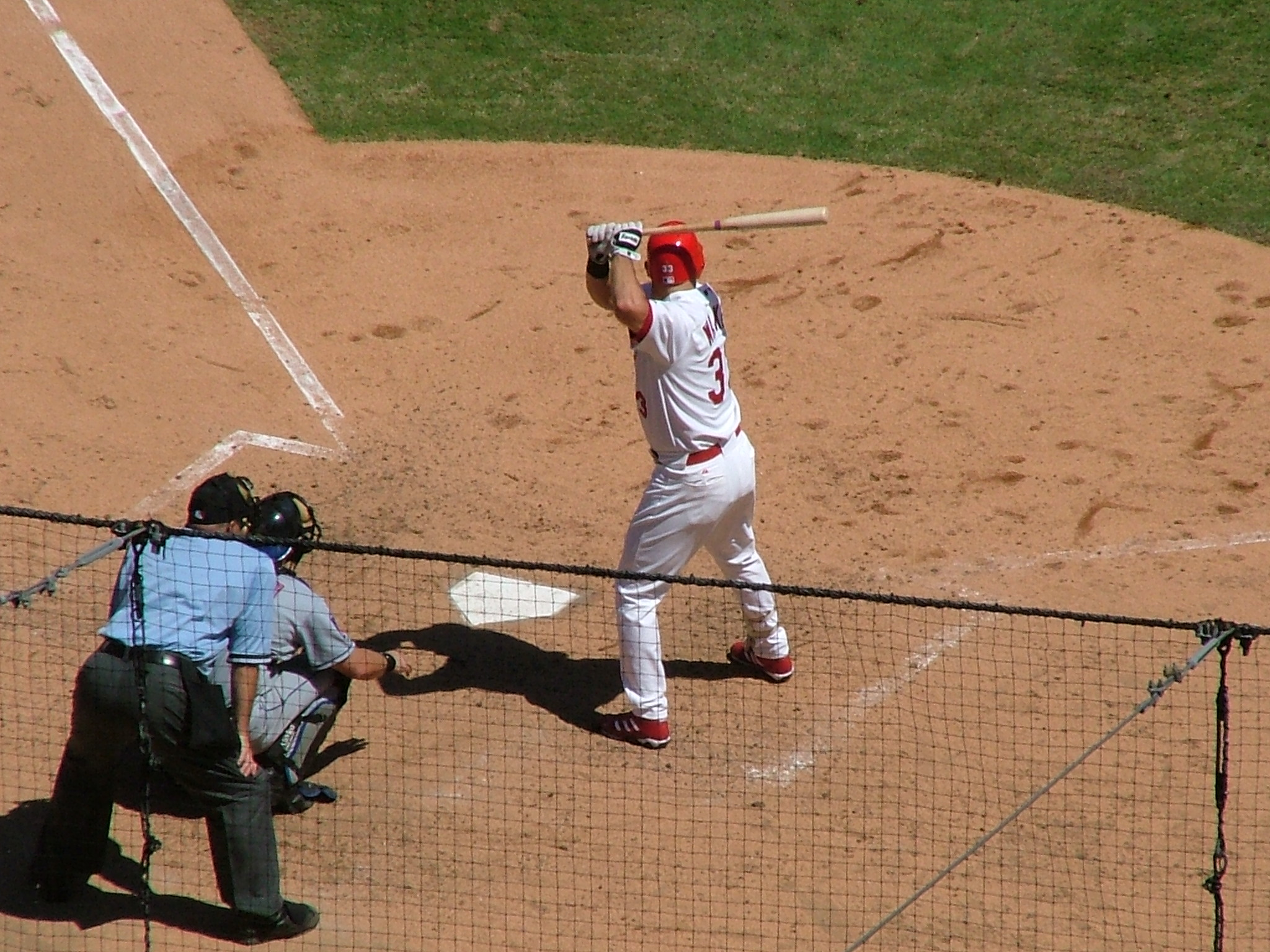
Walker at bat during his first game with St. Louis in 2004

On August 6, 2004, Colorado sent Walker, who was batting .324 in 38 games, to the St. Louis Cardinals for minor league pitcher Jason Burch and two players to be named later. On August 11, those players were identified as Chris Narveson and Luis Martínez. Customarily the Rockies' number three hitter, Walker became the Cardinals' number two hitter. He hit behind a speedy Tony Womack and in front of the 3−4−5 hitters of Jim Edmonds, Albert Pujols and Scott Rolen, who combined for 122 home runs and 358 RBI that year. Walker made his Cardinals debut on August 8, playing the New York Mets, and appeared as a pinch-hitter and struck out in the seventh inning. He drew a walk from Mike Stanton in the ninth inning and scored the game-winning run on a Yadier Molina single. Walker appeared in 44 games for the Cardinal powerhouse that won a major league-best 105 games, batting .280, .393 OBP, .560 SLG and 11 home runs.

In three playoff rounds in 2004, Walker combined to hit .293/.379/.707 with a pair of home runs in each series, setting a franchise record for home runs hit by a left-handed batter in one postseason. Walker made his playoff debut with the Cardinals in game one of the NLDS versus the Dodgers, homering twice and scoring four runs in an 8−3 Cardinals win. He became the first Cardinal with a multi-home run game in LDS play. In game one of the NL Championship Series (NLCS) against the Houston Astros, he was a home run short of hitting for the cycle.

St. Louis advanced to face the Boston Red Sox in the World Series, the first and only of Walker's playing career. In his debut game, he collected four hits in five at bats with a home run and two doubles. His four-hit outing tied a Cardinals World Series record, becoming the seventh overall and first since Lou Brock in 1967. Boston won the Series by sweeping St. Louis. The Cardinals struggled to hit, batting .190 with a .562 OPS, while Walker batted .357 with a 1.366 OPS. His two home runs were the only ones hit by the Cardinals. In the 2004 postseason, Walker scored 21 percent (14 of 68) of Cardinals runs.

==== Final season (2005) ====
Larry Walker ... he's a walking bag of ice.

— Cardinals coach Dave McKay, on Walker's late-career heroic hitting and fielding brilliance, per his Canadian Sports Hall of Fame profile

Walker also contributed to the 2005 NL Central division champions, winners of 100 games. A herniated disc in his neck prevented him from turning his head to the left, and on June 27, 2005, he received a second cortisone shot to alleviate the pain. With eight previous surgeries and now playing in pain that impeded his ability to continue to produce at a high level, Walker signaled that he would retire from playing after the season. He had $12 million team option for 2006.

In 100 regular-season games, Walker batted .289/.384/.502, good for a 130 OPS+. His playoff effort yielded much less success than the year prior, combining to collect three hits in 28 at bats in two rounds. The Astros defeated the Cardinals in the NLCS in the last game ever played at Busch Memorial Stadium, the second iteration of Busch Stadium. Walker doubled in the sixth inning in elimination game six versus Roy Oswalt for his final major league hit, but struck out in the ninth inning versus Dan Wheeler, his final at bat. He retired shortly after the game.

Walker ended his career 50th on Major League Baseball's all-time home run list with 383.

== Playing style ==
Walker began playing baseball seriously later than nearly all other players, but soon excelled at all aspects of the game, including hitting for both average and power, plate discipline, speed, defense, and throwing strength and accuracy, almost seamlessly translating the smoothness and agility of his hockey game to the diamond. Famously distinguished as "the accidental ballplayer" by a Sports Illustrated article in 1993, he displayed all skills of the ideal five-tool player. The transition was a feat even more impressive considering he only began playing organized baseball after graduating high school and did not attend college, and maintained staggering productivity over the course of his career in spite of myriad injuries. Baseball Reference's advanced metrics of the three major areas of the game (excluding pitching) −batting, baserunning and fielding−, echo a multitude of observations of Walker's overall excellence. He produced 420 runs above average in batting, or batting runs (Rbat), 94 fielding runs (Rfield), 40 baserunning runs (Rbase), and 10 runs above average avoiding grounding into double plays (Rdp). In every season following his short debut campaign of 1989, his adjusted OPS+ graded at minimum at 110; in just four seasons did he rate below average in fielding runs and twice in baserunning runs.

Former hitting coach Charley Lau wrote in Lau's Laws on Hitting that Walker had "a beautiful, one-piece swing" with "an exceptionally balanced stance," "excellent weight transfer" and "admirable...hip rotation"—everything needed for success at the plate.

Rival right fielder and long-time San Diego Padre Tony Gwynn epitomized Walker as "the most complete player in the National League," and "best baserunner in the game" in a 2002 profile for ESPN. He observed that, in addition to his obvious athletic gifts, Walker approaches the game very cerebrally and is always thinking ahead, unearthing a wide array of advantages that he applied to the game. Said one sportswriter, "His hand-eye co-ordination was off the charts, and his instincts as an outfielder and baserunner were unmatched." To Denver Post sports writer Tony Renck, "Walker is the most talented player I have ever covered. His 1997 NL MVP season was breathtaking in every way from baserunning to defense to his rifle arm and 49 home runs." Quipped his former manager with the Rockies Don Baylor, "He's a six-tool guy. Most talented player I've ever had." Former manager Bobby Cox remarked, "He's better than one of the best. He is the best."

On defense, Walker combined uncanny awareness and competence with the aplomb of an expert actor. By tapping into extensive knowledge of where to play for each hitter with what the pitcher was going to throw, he recognized where to position himself accordingly. He understood how to read the path and angle of the ball and anticipate how it would ricochet off the wall. His arm strength and accuracy often made it intimidating for baserunners to seize extra bases. Adept at mimicking catching long fly balls and line drives that he was actually unable to apprehend, he often fooled hitters into settling for singles when they could have taken extra bases.

== Post-playing career ==
=== Impact on baseball in Canada ===
Although Walker was not the first Canadian to become a star player in the major leagues, his influence in Canada and native British Columbia is far-reaching. "He was the standard for the height of baseball in Canada," commented Jeff Francis, a former major league pitcher from North Delta, British Columbia. "If you went to a provincial championship, his picture was on your T-shirt. Or if you went to play in Maple Ridge, you were playing at Larry Walker Field. The fact that he played for the Montreal Expos helped, too, so even people who weren't baseball fans knew who he was. He was that unreachable dream for kids who let you know it was reachable, that a Canadian could go do it."

=== Coaching ===
==== St. Louis Cardinals ====
In 2008, Walker was an instructor on the St. Louis Cardinals' spring training staff under manager Tony La Russa and did fill-in training with the Cardinals staff. He was offered a full-time role but chose to remain in his part-time position.

==== Canada national baseball team ====
Since 2009, Walker has served as a hitting coach and first base coach for the Canadian national team. He has coached for Team Canada in World Baseball Classic (WBC) tournaments in 2009, 2013, 2017, and 2023. In 2011, he served as hitting and first base coach for Canada at the Pan Am Games in Guadalajara, Mexico, where Canada won their first major international baseball championship. In the semifinal, Canada defeated host Mexico, 5–3. Next, Canada bested the United States 2–1 in the final, to win the gold medal. Walker reprised his coaching role at the 2015 Pan Am Games in Toronto. In a rematch of 2011, Canada defeated the United States in extra innings, 7–6, to claim their second consecutive gold medal at the Pan Am Games. Walker did not return for the 2019 Pan Am Games.

=== Recognition, awards, and halls of fame election and consideration ===
==== Post-career awards ====
During the 2006 season, MLB and DHL Express announced a promotion, DHL Hometown Heroes, for fans to vote for the most outstanding player in each franchise's history among five nominees each. Nominees for the Rockies included Walker, Bichette, Castilla, Galarraga, and Helton. On October 1, 2006, Walker was announced as the winner for the Rockies franchise.

Walker was elected to the BC Sports Hall of Fame and inducted May 13, 2009. CTV Vancouver called him "perhaps the greatest Canadian-born ballplayer of all time".

On June 20, 2009, it was announced that Walker and former major league catcher Ernie Whitt were inducted into the Canadian Baseball Hall of Fame. Walker was elected on his first ballot.

Of 33 MLB players and employees surveyed in 2012 to solicit the opinion of the greatest Canadian baseball player, Walker led with 16 votes, Jenkins was second with 10, and Joey Votto, Justin Morneau and Stubby Clapp each received two.

Fellow British Columbia native Justin Morneau signed with the Rockies prior to the 2014 season and requested and wore uniform number 33 in honor of Walker. Morneau had previously won an MVP in the American League. At the end of the 2014 season, he won the NL batting title, joining Walker as the second Canadian to win a batting title with the Rockies.

MLB held a contest dubbed "The Franchise Four" in 2015 for fans to select the four most influential players in the history of each franchise. On July 14, it was announced that Walker was selected along with Galarraga, Helton, and Troy Tulowitzki for the Rockies.

==== National Baseball Hall of Fame ====
Walker became eligible for induction into the National Baseball Hall of Fame in 2011. During his first year of eligibility, he received 118 votes, or 20.3 percent of all ballots cast; the threshold for entry is 75 percent. With a 34.1% of voters supporting enshrinement in 2018 — Walker's personal high at that point — he had previously yet to receive more than 22.9% of the vote. As Jay Jaffe noted, Walker has had difficulty gaining more support for election as he is "in something of a perfect storm" — low counting statistics relative to already-elected Hall of Famers, playing a large part of his career during the "steroid era," and taking more turns at the plate at Coors Field than anywhere else. One perception of Coors Field is that it inflates batting statistics far beyond a hitter's true ability.

Jaffe wrote that he found Walker to be well-qualified for induction into the Hall of Fame, contending that even though "his counting stats were low for the era, ... his all-round greatness added a considerable amount of hidden value that made up for lost time."

Of all who played right field as their primary position, Walker's 72.7 career Baseball Reference WAR ranks 11th all-time, and all 10 ahead of him are in the National Baseball Hall of Fame. A top-heavy list highlights five achievers of over 100 WAR and another two who accumulated at least 90. Three of the most accomplished hitters in history are there − Ruth (162.2), Aaron, (143.2), and Musial (128.6). The next two retired players below Walker, including Gwynn, were also elected to the Hall of Fame.

Wrote Tom Verducci of Walker's Hall of Fame credentials, the difference between playing in Denver and all other locations, including producing a 98-point in difference in average (.380 vs. .282), and a 49% higher home run rate, were "bothersome." Further, the lack of longevity kept him from election, as no right fielder with fewer than 2,500 games played or 2,500 hits has been selected. John Brattain wrote for Baseball Prospectus in 2002 that Walker had "Hall of Fame talent" and named him "among the elite National League outfielders, Coors Field or not," but without Hall of Fame credentials, due to a lack of longevity from injury. Brattain compared him to a number of failed hopefuls with similar statistics, including Dick Allen, who accrued impressive rate statistics adjusted for era and an MVP award. However, the comparisons only extended to batting accomplishments, leaving out defense and baserunning.

Noted of Walker's proper swing balance by the authors of Lau's Laws on Hitting, "don't be fooled into thinking that all of his glowing statistics are the result of playing at Coors Field. He posted some superb numbers in Montreal, too." Former AL batting champion George Brett offered on playing at Coors that "you have to adjust to what the ballpark offers you. The reason I hit the way I do is [Kauffman] Stadium — the big outfield and the turf. You play half your games there." Mike Piazza, who finished second to Walker in the 1997 NL MVP voting, commented the same year that "Walker is a great player having a great year. He plays in a great hitter's park, and I think it's unfortunate that some of their players don't get the credit they deserve because of that."

Walker was elected into the Baseball Hall of Fame in 2020 in his 10th and final year of eligibility; he was named on 304 of the 397 ballots (76.57%) cast by the writers. He became only the second Canadian elected into the Baseball Hall of Fame after Ferguson Jenkins was elected in 1991. Walker is also the first Hall of Fame player to wear a Rockies cap on his plaque. He created a sensation by wearing a NASCAR-style SpongeBob SquarePants shirt during the video interviews to commemorate the announcement of his election, citing that he was not optimistic he would be elected to the Hall of Fame. Both Amazon and Walmart in its online apparatus were found to have sold out of the shirt shortly after the interview aired. The SpongeBob shirt that Larry Walker wore on the day he was elected was itself put in the Hall of Fame as part of an exhibit in 2021.

== Accomplishments ==
Over his career, Walker produced a .313 batting average, .400 on-base percentage, and .565 slugging percentage for a 141 adjusted OPS+. One of only 19 hitters in history with a .300/.400/.500 batting line with at least 5,000 career plate appearances, his is one of only six whose careers began after 1960. Injuries forced him to miss 375 games from 1996 to 2004 as he appeared in 1,083 of 1,458 possible games. He hit over .300 nine times, hit at least 30 home runs four times and drove in 100 RBI five times. Defensively, he ranks eighth all-time among right fielders with 94 runs above average, per Baseball Reference. He was the 40th player in history to reach 2,000 hits, 400 doubles, 300 home runs, 1,000 runs scored, and 1,000 RBI.

Per Baseball Reference's advanced metrics, Walker produced 420 runs above average in batting, or batting runs (Rbat), 94 fielding runs (Rfield), and 40 base-running runs (Rbase). According to sports journalist Joe Posnanski, of all players who rank within the top 100 of either Rbat, Rfield, and defensive runs saved, 34 are in the top 100 in two of the categories, and three are in the top 100 in all three: Barry Bonds, Willie Mays, and Walker. His 94 Bfield ranks eighth all-time among right fielders, and Rbase are third all-time among right fielders and 32nd among all outfielders. Considering players of all positions in MLB history, just 13 others achieved a combination of 94 Rfield and 40 Rbase. When also considering Walker's 420 Rbat (which are park-adjusted), just three others met or exceeded all three levels: Hank Aaron, Bonds, and Mays.

With 72.7 career WAR according to Baseball Reference, Walker ranks 11th all-time among right fielders as of April 2025, including a top-heavy class where five achieved over 100 WAR and another two accumulated 90 WAR. All nine ahead of him are in the National Hall of Fame, and eight of nine played at least 2,400 games, compared to Walker's 1,988. There are 24 right fielders in the Hall of Fame. Populating the list are two of the top three home run hitters in history (Babe Ruth, 162.2; and Hank Aaron, 143.2), Musial (128.6), Mel Ott (110), Frank Robinson (107.3), Roberto Clemente (94.9) and Al Kaline (92.7). The next two after Walker, including Gwynn, are also in the Hall of Fame.^{[b]}

Walker is the only player in MLB history with at least a .310 batting average, 380 home runs, 1,300 RBI, a .965 OPS, 471 doubles, and 230 stolen bases. Just four others players reached all levels other than the stolen base category: Musial, Ruth, Ted Williams, and Lou Gehrig. Among all players with at least 8,000 plate appearances as of 2015, Walker is tied with Chipper Jones for 36th all-time with a 141 OPS+. Walker's slugging percentage ranks 12th all-time. His 140 wRC+ ranks 37th in history among players with at least 8,000 plate appearances. He is one of 30 players to win at least three batting titles.

Remarkably, Walker maintained superior longevity in right field despite persistent injuries during his career. Never having to permanently move off the position, he made significant contributions there every season of his career, while at times covering for significant stretches at first base (1991 and 1994), center field (1996) and left field (2000). He ranks 17th in games played in right field, with 1,718, 20th in assists (150), 11th in double plays turned (40), ninth in defensive zone runs (100), and 44th in fielding percentage (.986). Among all outfielders, he is 22nd in defensive zone runs (101), 77th in double plays turned (40), and 93rd in games played (1,804).

Over his general peak seasons covering 1992−2002, Walker ranked sixth among all MLB position players in WAR with 53.9, while batting .327, .410 OBP, .602 SLG, with 300 home runs. Among all players with at least 4,000 at bats in that span, the average ranked second to Gwynn, weighted on-base average (wOBA, .428) and slugging third to McGwire and Bonds, and OBP 11th. During his five highest peak seasons spanning 1997−2001, he batted .357/.445/.658.

In Colorado, Walker batted .382/.462/.710 and 229 of his career home runs in 2,501 PA. In all other ballparks, he batted .282/.372/.501 and 154 of career home runs in 5,529 PA. His road OPS in nine full seasons playing for the Rockies was .890, and his career road OPS was .865, just ahead of Ken Griffey Jr. at .860. Of all players with at least 1,000 road games played, Walker's OPS ranked 39th as of 2015. As of 2016, the number of Hall of Famers who had exceeded his road totals followed as thus: 35 hit more than his 168 home runs, 63 drove in more than his 564 RBI, 32 stole more than his 109 bases, 33 hit for a higher OPS than his .865, and 56 hit more than his 203 doubles.

Walker is the Rockies' career leader in batting average (.334), on-base percentage (.426), slugging percentage (.618), OPS (1.044), and OPS+ (147). He remains in the top ten in many cumulative offensive categories for the Rockies, many of which he trails only Todd Helton or Charlie Blackmon, who both played many more games for Colorado than Walker. Walker holds many Rockies' single-season records, many of them set during his 1997 MVP season.

Walker and pitcher Ferguson Jenkins are often considered the greatest Canadian-born baseball players. Jenkins was, prior to Walker's election, the only native Canadian to be elected to the National Baseball Hall of Fame, and the first of only two Canadians to win the Cy Young Award (the second is Éric Gagné in 2003). Since Walker won the MVP Award in 1997, Justin Morneau (2006) and Joey Votto (2010) became the second and third Canadians win the award. Only Walker and Votto (six) have won the Tip O'Neill Award more than three times in their career.

=== Commendations ===
Honors received
Title	Date	Ref
BC Sports Hall of Fame inductee	2009	
Canada's Athletes of the 20th Century #9 Greatest Male Athlete	1999	
Canada's Sports Hall of Fame inductee	2007	
Canadian Baseball Hall of Fame inductee	2009	
Colorado Sports Hall of Fame inductee	2011	
National Baseball Hall of Fame inductee	2020	

Awards and exhibition team selections
Name of award	Times	Dates	Ref
Baseball Digest Player of the Year	1	1997	
Colorado Rockies Player of the Year	2	1997, 1999	
DHL Hometown Hero for Colorado Rockies franchise	1	2006	
ESPY Award for Best Major League Player	1	1998	
Home Run Derby participant	3	1992, 1997, 1999	
Lionel Conacher Award	1	1998	
Lou Marsh Trophy	1	1998	
MLB All-Star	5	1992, 1997–99, 2001	
MLB Franchise Four selection for Colorado Rockies	1	2015	
Montreal Expos Player of the Year	1	1992	
National League (NL) Most Valuable Player	1	1997 4× Top-10 MVP (1992 − 5th; 1995 − 7th; 1997 − Won; 1999 − 10th)	
NL Player of the Month	2	April 1997, July 2002	
NL Player of the Week	4	May 26, 1996; Apr. 6, 1997; Sep. 21, 1997; May 2, 1999	
Players Choice Award for NL Outstanding Player	1	1997	
Rawlings Gold Glove Award at outfield	7	1992, 1993, 1997–99, 2001, 2002	
Silver Slugger Award at outfield	3	1992, 1997, 1999	
Tip O'Neill Award	9	1987, 1990, 1992, 1994, 1995, 1997, 1998, 2001 – with Corey Koskie, 2002 – with Éric Gagné	

=== Statistical achievements ===
Career offensive totals
Category	G	PA	AB	R	H	2B	3B	HR	RBI	SB	BB	SO	AVG	OBP	SLG	OPS	OPS+	TB	RC	P−S	Off%
Totals	1,988	8,030	6,907	1,355	2,160	471	62	383	1,311	230	913	1,231	.313	.400	.565	.965	141	3,904	1,619	287.4	.746
Top 10	—	—	—	3	1	4	2	5	5	1	2	1	6	6	8	8	7	4	5	5	8
All-time	—	—	—	107	199	88	—	66	105	—	165	162	78	55	12	14	74	103	66	31	29

Career defensive totals
Category	G	Innings	TC	PO	A	E	DP	Fld	RF/9	Rtot
Right field	1,718	14,987	3,322	3,125	150	47	40	.986	2.07	96
First base	81	691.2	729	661	59	9	53	.988	9.37	−2
Center field	69	490.2	133	129	3	1	0	.992	2.42	−4
Left field	33	261	68	66	2	0	0	1.000	2.34	5
Designated hitter	27									
Second base	1	0.0	0	0	0	0	0			
Third base	1	0.0	0	0	0	0	0			
Top 5 as RF	4	—	—	3	7	1	11	7	2	8

National League statistical leader
Category	Times	Seasons
All players
Wins Above Replacement (WAR) leader	1	1997
Offensive statistics
Batting champion	3	1998, 1999, 2001
Doubles leader	1	1994
Extra base hits leader	1	1997
Home run leader	1	1997
On-base percentage leader	2	1997, 1999
On-base plus slugging leader	2	1997, 1999
Slugging percentage leader	2	1997, 1999
Total bases leader	1	1997
Defensive statistics as RF
Assists	3	1992, 1995, 2002
Double plays turned	5	1991, 1992, 1997, 2000, 2002
Fielding percentage	1	1997
Total zone runs	1	1993

Records and distinctions
- MLB
  - Only player to reach .700 slugging percentage and 30 stolen bases in same season (1997)
  - Fifth player in history to join 40–30 club (1997)
  - Record 6 consecutive extra base hits (May 21–22, 1996)
  - Former record of 29 runs scored in month of April (held from 1997 to 2017)

Colorado Rockies single-season records
Category	Record	Date
Adjusted OPS+	178	1997
At bats per home run	11.6	1997
Batting average	.379	1999
Home runs (tied)	49	1997
Offensive win %	.857	1997
On-base plus slugging	1.172	1997
Slugging percentage	.720	1997
Runs scored	143	1997
Total bases	409	1997
Wins Above Replacement	9.8	1997
Reference:. Through 2024 season.

Colorado Rockies career rankings
Category	Rank	Total
Adjusted OPS+	1st	147
Bases on balls	2nd	589
Batting average	1st	.334
Doubles	2nd	297
Extra base hits	3rd	599
Games played	4th	1170
Home runs	2nd	258
Offensive win %	1st	.789
On-base percentage	1st	.426
On-base plus slugging	1st	1.044
Power−speed number	2nd	169.3
Runs batted in	2nd	848
Runs scored	3rd	892
Slugging percentage	1st	.618
Stolen bases	3rd	126
Strikeouts	9th	659
Triples	4th	44
Reference:. Through 2024 season.

== Personal life ==
Walker resides in West Palm Beach, Florida. He is married and has three children, including one from a previous marriage.

Walker is an avid bowler. He bowled a 300 game on April 10, 2014.

Superstitious about the number three, Walker wore number 33 during his playing career and had his marriage to his first wife on November 3, 1990, at 3:33. His in-game rituals all involved the number three, including taking three swings, or any multiple thereof, in the batter's box before each at bat. His superstition continued after his career, as Walker was the 333rd person to be inducted into the National Baseball Hall of Fame.

A donor to the Rockies Youth Field of Dreams program, Walker donated up to $250,000 in total to open multiple baseball facilities across Colorado.

== See also ==
- List of Canadian sports personalities
- List of Colorado Rockies team records
- List of Major League Baseball annual doubles leaders
- List of Major League Baseball career assists as a right fielder leaders
- List of Major League Baseball career batting average leaders
- List of Major League Baseball career doubles leaders
- List of Major League Baseball career extra base hits leaders
- List of Major League Baseball career hits leaders
- List of Major League Baseball career home run leaders
- List of Major League Baseball career on-base percentage leaders
- List of Major League Baseball career OPS leaders
- List of Major League Baseball career putouts as a right fielder leaders
- List of Major League Baseball career runs scored leaders
- List of Major League Baseball career runs batted in leaders
- List of Major League Baseball career slugging percentage leaders
- List of Major League Baseball players from Canada
- List of members of Canada's Sports Hall of Fame
- List of National League annual slugging percentage leaders

== Bibliography ==
- Lau, Charley Jr.; Flanagan, Jeffrey (2000). Lau's Laws on Hitting: The Art of Hitting .400 for the Next Generation. Lanham, Maryland: First Taylor Trade Publishing. ISBN 978-1886110953. OCLC 45731499.

Awards and achievements
Preceded by Tony Gwynn; Todd Helton	Major League Baseball batting leader 1998−1999; 2001	Succeeded by Todd Helton; Barry Bonds
Preceded by Gary Sheffield; Mark McGwire	National League on-base percentage leader 1997; 1999	Succeeded by Mark McGwire; Todd Helton
Preceded by Ellis Burks; Mark McGwire	National League slugging percentage leader 1997; 1999	Succeeded by Mark McGwire; Todd Helton
Preceded by Ken Caminiti; Jeff Kent	National League Player of the Month; April 1997; July 2002	Succeeded by Tony Gwynn; Barry Bonds
