= Montreal Expos Player of the Year =

- Awarded for: The top player for the Montreal Expos, as voted by the Montreal chapter of the Baseball Writers' Association of America
- Location: Montreal, Quebec
- Country: Canada
- Presented by: Montreal chapter of the Baseball Writers' Association of America (1969–2004)

The Montreal Expos Player of the Year award was voted by the Montreal chapter of the Baseball Writers' Association of America (BBWAA) at the end of each season, until the Montreal Expos moved to Washington, D.C., US, following the 2004 season.

== Winners ==
- 1969- Rusty Staub
- 1970- Carl Morton
- 1971- Ron Hunt
- 1972- Mike Marshall
- 1973- Mike Marshall
- 1974- Willie Davis
- 1975- Gary Carter
- 1976- Woodie Fryman
- 1977- Gary Carter
- 1978- Ross Grimsley
- 1979- Larry Parrish
- 1980- Gary Carter
- 1981- Andre Dawson
- 1982- Al Oliver
- 1983- Tim Raines & Andre Dawson
- 1984- Gary Carter
- 1985- Tim Raines
- 1986- Tim Raines
- 1987- Tim Wallach
- 1988- Andrés Galarraga
- 1989- Tim Wallach
- 1990- Tim Wallach
- 1991- Dennis Martínez
- 1992- Larry Walker
- 1993- Marquis Grissom
- 1994- Moisés Alou
- 1995- David Segui
- 1996- Henry Rodriguez
- 1997- Pedro Martínez
- 1998- Vladimir Guerrero
- 1999- Vladimir Guerrero
- 2000- Vladimir Guerrero
- 2001- Orlando Cabrera
- 2002- Vladimir Guerrero
- 2003- Orlando Cabrera
- 2004- Brad Wilkerson

== See also ==
- Montreal Expos § Players
- Montreal Expos Hall of Fame
- Baseball awards § Awards given to members of specific teams
