= List of Major League Baseball career doubles leaders =

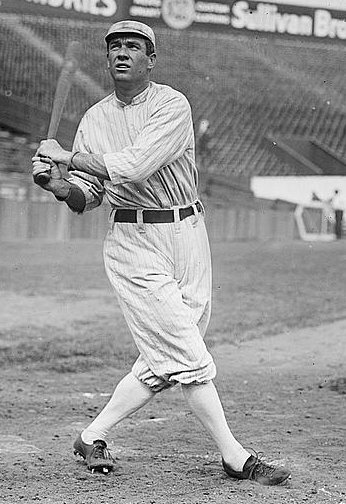
Tris Speaker is the all-time leader in doubles, with 792.

In baseball, a double is a hit in which the batter advances to second base in one play, without the benefit of a fielding error, advancing to second on a throw to another base, or another runner being put out on a fielder's choice. A batter may also be credited with a ground-rule double when a fair ball, after touching the ground, bounds into the stands or becomes lodged in a fence or scoreboard. This list includes the top 100 doubles hitters in baseball.

Hall of Fame center fielder Tris Speaker holds the Major League Baseball career doubles record with 792. Pete Rose is second with 746, the National League record. Speaker, Rose, Stan Musial (725), and Ty Cobb (724) are the only players with more than 700 doubles. Albert Pujols has the most career doubles by a right-handed hitter with 686. Only doubles hit during the regular season are included in the totals (Derek Jeter holds the record in post-season doubles, with 32).

== Key ==
**Rank**	Rank amongst leaders in career doubles. A blank field indicates a tie.
**Player (2026 2Bs)**	Number of doubles hit during the 2026 Major League Baseball season
**2B**	Total career doubles hit
*	Denotes elected to National Baseball Hall of Fame.
**Bold**	Denotes active player. (Note: A player is considered inactive if he has announced his retirement or has not played for a full season.)

== List ==
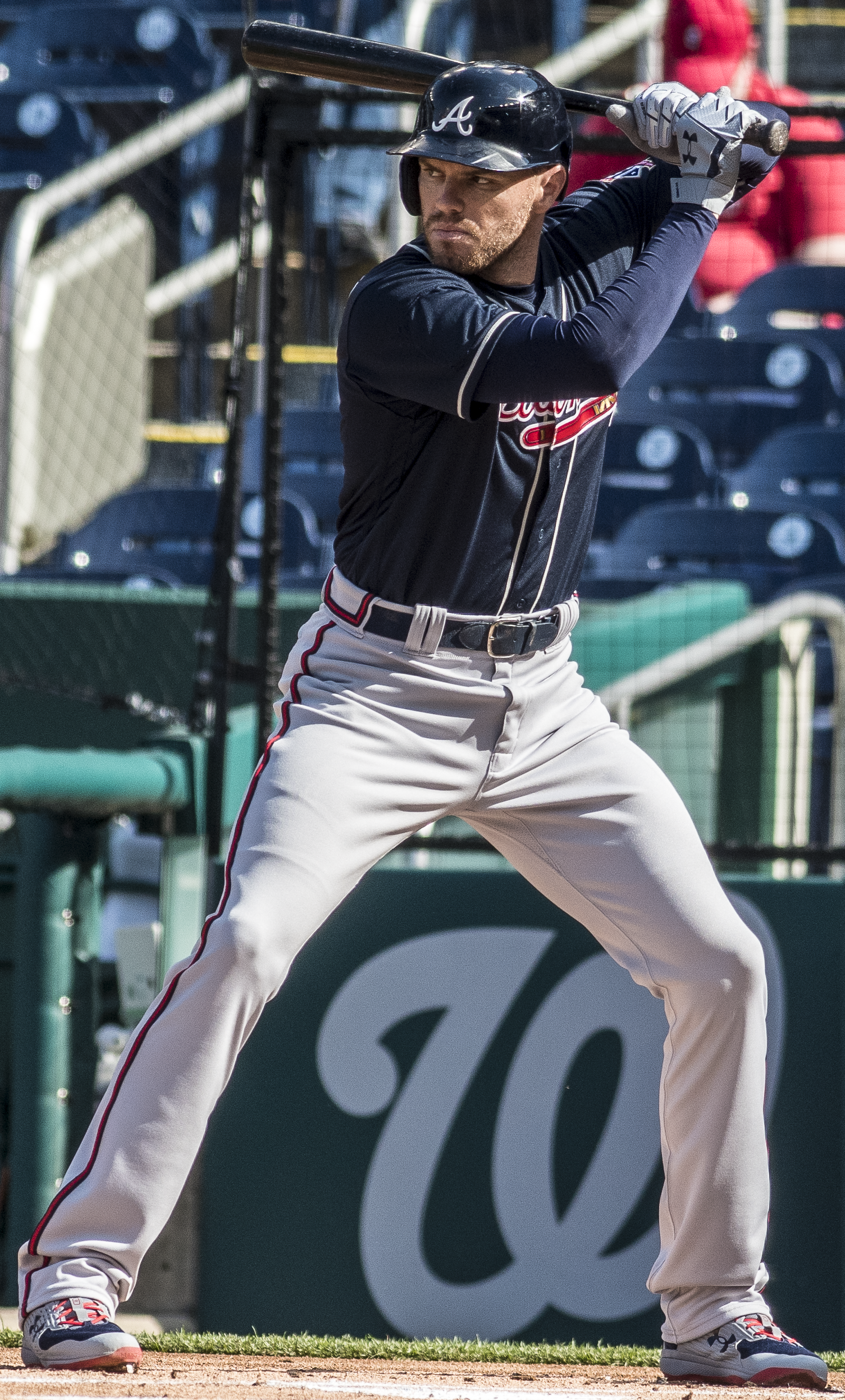
Freddie Freeman, the active leader in doubles and 24th all-time.

- Stats updated as of September 24, 2026.

Rank	Player (2026 2Bs)	2B
1	Tris Speaker*	792
2	Pete Rose	746
3	Stan Musial*	725
4	Ty Cobb*	724
5	Albert Pujols	686
6	Craig Biggio*	668
7	George Brett*	665
8	Nap Lajoie*	657
9	Carl Yastrzemski*	646
10	Honus Wagner*	643
11	Adrián Beltré*	636
12	David Ortiz*	632
13	Miguel Cabrera	627
14	Hank Aaron*	624
15	Paul Molitor*	605
	Paul Waner*	605
17	Cal Ripken Jr.*	603
18	Barry Bonds	601
19	Luis Gonzalez	596
20	Todd Helton*	592
21	Rafael Palmeiro	585
22	Robin Yount*	583
23	Cap Anson*	582
24	**Freddie Freeman (32)**	579
25	Wade Boggs*	578
26	Bobby Abreu	574
	Charlie Gehringer*	574
28	Robinson Canó	572
	Iván Rodríguez*	572
30	Carlos Beltrán*	565
31	Jeff Kent*	560
	Eddie Murray*	560
33	Chipper Jones*	549
34	Alex Rodriguez	548
35	Manny Ramirez	547
36	Derek Jeter*	544
37	Tony Gwynn*	543
38	Harry Heilmann*	542
39	Rogers Hornsby*	541
40	Joe Medwick*	540
	Dave Winfield*	540
42	Al Simmons*	539
43	Lou Gehrig*	534
44	Al Oliver	529
45	Frank Robinson*	528
46	Dave Parker*	526
47	Ted Williams*	525
48	Ken Griffey Jr.*	524
49	Willie Mays*	523
50	Garret Anderson	522

Rank	Player (2026 2Bs)	2B
	Johnny Damon	522
	Ed Delahanty*	522
53	Scott Rolen*	517
54	Joe Cronin*	515
55	Nick Markakis	514
	Edgar Martínez*	514
57	Mark Grace	511
	Jimmy Rollins	511
59	Rickey Henderson*	510
60	Babe Ruth*	506
61	Tony Pérez*	505
62	Roberto Alomar*	504
63	Andre Dawson*	503
64	Goose Goslin*	500
	John Olerud	500
66	Rusty Staub	499
67	Bill Buckner	498
	Torii Hunter	498
	Al Kaline*	498
	Sam Rice*	498
71	Aramis Ramírez	495
	Frank Thomas*	495
73	Heinie Manush*	491
74	**Paul Goldschmidt (13)**	490
	Mickey Vernon	490
76	Jeff Bagwell*	488
	Harold Baines*	488
	Mel Ott*	488
79	Lou Brock*	486
	Billy Herman*	486
81	Vada Pinson	485
82	Hal McRae	484
83	Carlos Delgado	483
	Dwight Evans	483
	Ted Simmons*	483
86	Brooks Robinson*	482
87	Alfonso Soriano	481
88	**Jose Altuve** **(24)**	479
89	Vladimir Guerrero*	477
90	Zach Wheat*	476
91	Jake Beckley*	473
92	Larry Walker*	471
93	Carlos Lee	469
94	Matt Holliday	468
	Jim O'Rourke*	468
	Miguel Tejada	468
97	Gary Sheffield	467
98	Frankie Frisch*	466
99	Jim Bottomley*	465
100	Reggie Jackson*	463

== See also ==
- List of Major League Baseball career triples leaders
- List of Major League Baseball career home run leaders
