= Todd Helton =

American baseball player (born 1973)

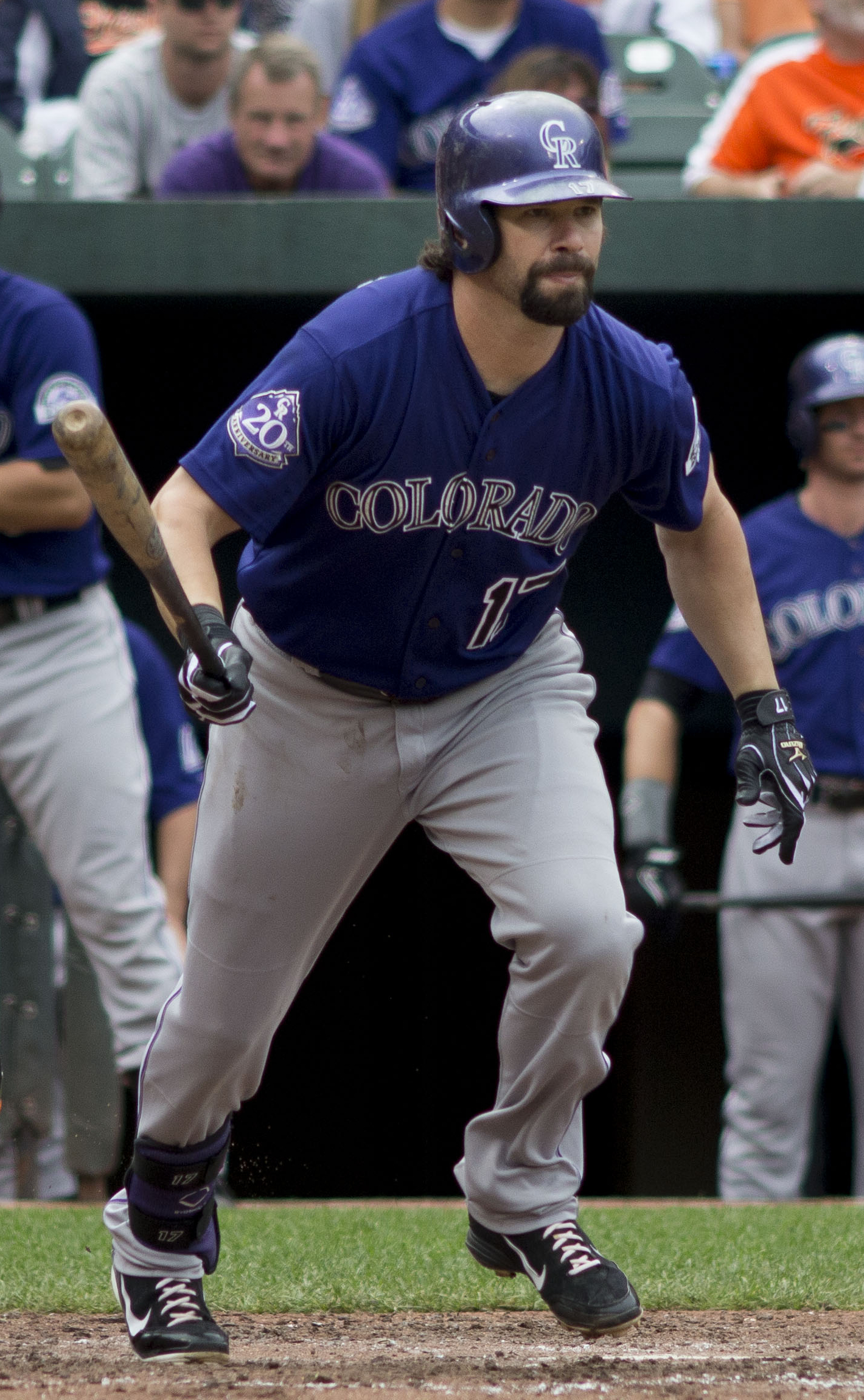
- Helton with the Colorado Rockies in 2013
- First baseman
- Born: August 20, 1973 (age 53); Knoxville, Tennessee, U.S.
- Batted: Left Threw: Left

MLB debut
- August 2, 1997, for the Colorado Rockies

Last MLB appearance
- September 29, 2013, for the Colorado Rockies

MLB statistics
- Batting average: .316
- Hits: 2,519
- Home runs: 369
- Runs batted in: 1,406
- Stats at Baseball Reference

Teams
- Colorado Rockies (1997–2013)

Career highlights and awards
- 5× All-Star (2000–2004); 3× Gold Glove Award (2001, 2002, 2004); 4× Silver Slugger Award (2000–2003); NL Hank Aaron Award (2000); MLB batting champion (2000); MLB RBI leader (2000); Dick Howser Trophy (1995); Colorado Rockies No. 17 retired

Member of the National

Baseball Hall of Fame
- Induction: 2024
- Vote: 79.7% (sixth ballot)

Todd Lynn Helton (born August 20, 1973) is an American former professional baseball first baseman who played his entire 17-year Major League Baseball (MLB) career for the Colorado Rockies. A five-time All-Star, four-time Silver Slugger, and three-time Gold Glove Award winner, Helton holds the Rockies' club records for hits (2,519), home runs (369), doubles (592), walks (1,335), runs scored (1,401), runs batted in (RBIs, with 1,406), games played (2,247), and total bases (4,292), among others.

Helton grew up in Tennessee and played college baseball and football for the Tennessee Volunteers. The Rockies drafted him in the first round of the 1995 MLB draft, and he debuted in the majors in 1997.

During his peak from 1999 to 2004, Helton met or topped these benchmarks each season: .320 batting average, 39 doubles, 30 home runs, 107 runs scored, 96 RBI, .577 slugging percentage and .981 on-base plus slugging. In 2000, he won the batting title with a .372 average and also led MLB with a .698 slugging percentage, 59 doubles, and 147 RBI and the National League (NL) with 216 hits. Helton helped the Rockies win the NL pennant in 2007 before being swept in the World Series. He collected his 2,000th career hit on May 19, 2009 and his 2,500th on September 1, 2013. He retired at the end of that season, homering in his final game at Coors Field.

Helton was inducted into the Baseball Hall of Fame in 2024, his sixth year on the ballot. Helton is one of only two Hall-of-Famers to have played for the Rockies (the other being Larry Walker, who was in the class of 2020), and is the only MLB Hall-of-Famer to have played his entire career for the Rockies.

== Amateur career ==
Helton attended Central High School in Knoxville, Tennessee and was a letterman in football and baseball. In football, he posted 2,772 total yards as a quarterback. In baseball, as a senior, Helton had a .655 batting average and 12 home runs and was named the Regional Player of the Year. Baseball America named him an All-American his senior season. He was named the Gatorade Player of the Year for football and baseball in Tennessee.

Helton was drafted in the second round (55th overall) by the San Diego Padres in the 1992 MLB draft. He did not sign, instead choosing to attend college.

=== University of Tennessee ===
Helton received an athletic scholarship from the University of Tennessee to play both football and baseball. As a freshman and sophomore, he backed up Heath Shuler at quarterback. Entering his junior season in 1994, he was the backup to senior Jerry Colquitt and ahead of Peyton Manning, who was then a true freshman. After Colquitt tore knee ligaments in the season opener at UCLA, Helton took over as the starter. Three weeks later against Mississippi State, he suffered a knee injury and was replaced by Manning, who went on to break several records. Helton appeared in 12 games during his career with the Volunteers football team, completing 41 of 75 passes for 484 yards, four touchdowns, and three interceptions.

In baseball, Helton was awarded the Dick Howser Trophy as the national college baseball player of the year, following his junior baseball season in 1995. During his career at Tennessee (1993–1995), he recorded a .370 batting average with 38 home runs and 238 RBI (both school records), while also pitching 193 innings, registering an ERA of 2.24, with 172 strikeouts and 23 saves. In 1995, he set the Tennessee saves record with 11, while posting a 0.89 ERA. Helton also has the second-longest streak of consecutive scoreless innings in NCAA Division I, with 47 in 1994.

Helton spent the summer of 1994 playing for the Orleans Cardinals of the Cape Cod Baseball League (CCBL), where he was named a league all-star. He was inducted into the CCBL Hall of Fame in 2024.

== MLB career ==
=== Draft and debut ===
The Colorado Rockies selected Helton with the eighth overall pick of the 1995 Major League Baseball draft. He signed on August 1, 1995. He spent the next two years in the minor leagues, playing for the Class-A Asheville Tourists, Double-A New Haven Ravens, and Triple-A Colorado Springs Sky Sox before moving up to the majors. He made his major-league debut on August 2, 1997, a 6–5 road loss to the Pittsburgh Pirates. He started in left field, flied out in his first at-bat, singled in his next time up off Francisco Córdova, and hit a solo home run off Marc Wilkins.

=== 1997–1999: Early career ===
During the 1997 season, Helton hit for a .280/.337/.484 slash line, with five home runs, in 35 games. After the season, the Rockies were left facing a major dilemma. Incumbent first baseman Andrés Galarraga was still highly productive and tremendously popular among the fan base, while Helton had shown that he was clearly ready to replace him as the team's first baseman. The Rockies controversially opted to let the 36 year old Galarraga go; he signed a three year deal with the Atlanta Braves and had a monster year, although he missed the entire season thereafter after being diagnosed with non-Hodgkin's lymphoma, before returning in year three to post another highly successful season. Meanwhile, Helton replaced him as the full-time starter at first base, thus beginning his 15 year tenure as the team's regular first baseman, starting with that 1998 season. The Rockies named Helton their club representative in 1998, the first time the team had ever given that role to a rookie. (Helton's 1997 playing time was sufficiently limited so that he retained rookie status in 1998.) Helton slashed .315/.380/.530, with 25 home runs and 97 RBI, in 152 games. He led all rookies in average (.315), home runs (25), RBI (97), multi-hit games (49), total bases (281), slugging percentage (SLG) (.530) and extra base hits (63). He also led all National League (NL) rookies in runs (78), hits (167) and on-base percentage (.380). At the time, only Mike Piazza (35), David Justice (28), and Darryl Strawberry (26) had hit more home runs as an NL rookie since 1972, and only Piazza had more RBI (112). Helton finished second to Kerry Wood of the Chicago Cubs in the voting for NL Rookie of the Year. The Tennessee Sports Hall of Fame named Helton its 1998 Professional Athlete of the Year.

In 1999, Helton put up a slash line of .320/.395/.587. He slugged 35 home runs and drove in 113 RBI, while also drawing 68 walks. On June 19, in a 10–2 home win over the Florida Marlins, Helton hit for the cycle. He fell one hit shy of hitting for a second cycle on four occasions during the 1999 season. Had he managed to repeat the performance that season, he would have become only the second player since 1900 to pull it off, the other being Babe Herman in 1931.

=== 2000–2006: Mid-career ===
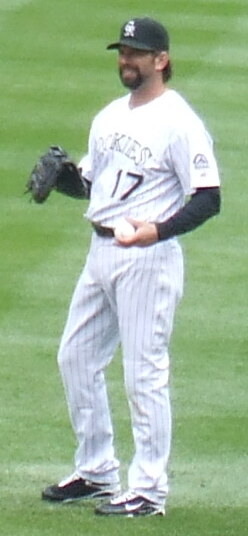
Helton fielding with the Rockies, c. 2005

Helton enjoyed arguably his best season in 2000, leading the major leagues in batting average (.372), RBI (147), doubles (59), total bases (405), extra base hits (103), slugging percentage (.698) and OPS (1.162). He led the NL in hits (216) and on-base percentage (.463). Helton hit a league-leading home batting average of .391 and was third in the NL in road batting average (.353). Helton's MLB-leading 103 extra base hits tied for the fourth most in MLB history and the second most in NL history. His league-leading numbers in on-base percentage, slugging percentage and batting average gave him the "percentage triple crown." Helton became the second Rockies player, after Larry Walker in 1999, to accomplish that feat. Helton and Walker made the Rockies the first team in MLB history to record percentage triple crowns in consecutive seasons with different players. Helton became only the fourth player in NL history to lead the league in both batting average and RBI. He became the first player in NL history and the fifth player in MLB history (Babe Ruth, Lou Gehrig, Jimmie Foxx and Hank Greenberg are the others) to have at least 200 hits, 40 home runs, 100 RBI, 100 runs, 100 extra base hits, and 100 walks in one season.

Helton was invited to his first career MLB All-Star Game in 2000. He also received NL Player of the Month honors for May and August. He finished fifth in voting for the MVP award. However, the Associated Press, Sporting News, USA Baseball Alumni, and Baseball Digest all named Helton the MLB Player of the Year. Buck O'Neil and the Negro Leagues Baseball Museum presented Helton with the Walter Fenner "Buck" Leonard Legacy Award. Helton was also given the team-honored version of the Roberto Clemente Award, for his community contributions to eastern Tennessee. Furthermore, he was the NL winner of the second annual Hank Aaron Award. Each season from 2000 to 2003, he was named the Rockies Player of the Year.

Capitalizing on his success, Helton signed a nine-year, $141.5 million contract in April 2001, which took effect after his then-contract expired after 2002. That season, Helton hit a career-high 49 home runs (22 of them occurred away from hitter-friendly Coors Field). He tied Walker for the most home runs ever by a Rockies player in one season. Additionally, Helton had a .336/.432/.685 slash line. He had 105 extra base hits, making him the first player in MLB history to have at least 100 total extra base hits in back-to-back seasons. Furthermore, Helton attained 402 total bases, making him only the fourth player in MLB history to do so in consecutive seasons (Chuck Klein, Gehrig and Foxx are the others). Helton appeared in his second consecutive All-Star Game in 2001 — his first as a starter. He won his first Gold Glove at first base and was once again a top candidate for MVP, but was beaten in balloting by Sammy Sosa and Barry Bonds.

In 2002, Helton had a .329 batting average, 30 home runs, 109 RBI, 98 walks, 107 runs, .577 SLG and 319 total bases. He became the first player in Rockies history to score at least 100 runs in four consecutive seasons. He was named NL Player of the Month for May, when he hit .347 with six doubles, one triple, 10 home runs and 28 RBI. Helton was named to his third consecutive All-Star Game — his second straight as a starter. He also received his second consecutive Gold Glove.

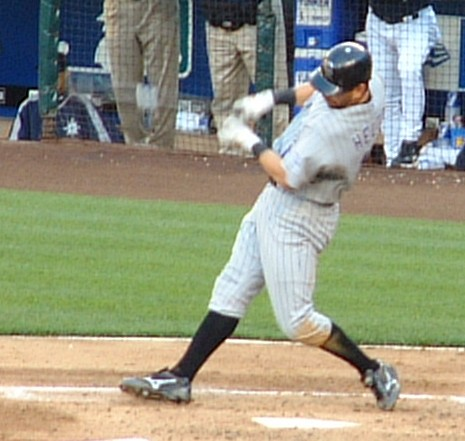
Helton swinging at a pitch during a game against the Seattle Mariners in 2006.

2003 saw Helton involved in the closest NL batting race in history, as he hit .35849, while St. Louis Cardinals first baseman Albert Pujols edged him out by posting a .35871 batting average to win the batting crown. Helton also had 33 home runs, 117 RBI, 135 runs, 49 doubles and five triples. He won his fourth Player of the Month honor for April, when he hit .337 with six home runs, 27 RBI, 28 runs, 11 doubles and 24 walks. He also appeared in his fourth consecutive All-Star Game.

During the 2004 season, Helton again finished second in the NL batting race, as he hit .347, while San Francisco Giants left fielder Barry Bonds hit .362. Helton also had 32 home runs and 96 RBI on the season. He became the first player in MLB history to hit at least .315 with 25 home runs and 95 RBI in each of his first seven full seasons in the majors. He became only the third player in MLB history to accomplish that feat during any seven-year stretch in a career (Lou Gehrig and Babe Ruth are the others). He set a franchise record by hitting at least 30 home runs in six consecutive seasons. Helton was named to his team-record fifth consecutive All-Star Game and won his third Gold Glove during the season.

In 2005, Helton was placed on the disabled list (July 26 – August 9) for the first time in his career, missing time with a strained left calf muscle. He hit .320 with 20 home runs, 79 RBI, 92 runs, and 45 doubles for the season. He was under 1.000 in OPS (finished with .979 OPS) for the first time since 1999, and was also left off the NL All-Star roster for the first time since that same year. At the same time, he joined Gehrig and Bill Terry as the only first basemen in MLB history to have at least a .315 batting average in eight consecutive seasons. Also in 2005, St. Louis Cardinals radio broadcaster Wayne Hagin claimed manager Don Baylor said that Helton had "tried the juice" in the 1990s, implying steroid use. Helton vehemently denied the allegation and considered legal action against Hagin. Hagin later apologized, claiming that his comments were "referring to supplements, creatine, not steroids", when he said "juiced". Baylor said of his conversation with Hagin, "We discussed creatine and that was the end of the conversation. Steroid use was never even a question with me in regards to Todd Helton. [Hagin] has his facts wrong."

The following season, Helton again missed some time with an injury. He was on the disabled list from April 20 to May 4, having been diagnosed with acute terminal ileitis. For the season, he hit .302 with 15 home runs, 81 RBI, 40 doubles, 91 walks, to go with a .404 on-base percentage. He ended the season below .900 in OPS (with a .880 OPS) for the first time since entering the league in 1997, which was a year in which he had he only 35 games. Helton finished third on the team in runs (94), hits (165), doubles (40), total bases (260), and multi-hit games (42).

=== 2007–2013 ===
Helton's power and RBI production stayed relatively level to his previous year's stats during the 2007 season, as he managed 17 home runs and 91 RBI. These numbers were well below his career norms, yet Helton kept up his string of seven consecutive seasons with an on-base percentage higher than .400, nine consecutive seasons with a batting average above .300, and also walked more times than he struck out (a feat he accomplished in seven of his first ten full seasons). Helton recorded his 1,000th career hit at Coors Field on June 20, in a 6–1 home win over the New York Yankees, becoming only the fifth active player to have 1,000 career hits in one ballpark. On September 9, in 4–2 home victory over the San Diego Padres, Helton hit his 35th double of the season. This made him the only player in MLB history to have hit 35 or more doubles in at least 10 consecutive seasons (1998–2007). Helton hit his 300th career home run on September 16 in a 13–0 home win over the Florida Marlins. He became the first player to hit 300 home runs for the Rockies.

The 2007 season was a wild see-saw affair for the Rockies. After they began the season with a 13-1 record, threatening to run away with the division, they underwent multiple red hot and ice cold streaks, leaving them in a desperate spot in September, as they tried to earn a playoff spot for the first time since their brief October appearance of 1995.

On September 18, during the second game of doubleheader against their division rivals, the Los Angeles Dodgers, with the Rockies down to their last out, trailing by a run, Helton hit a clutch two-run walk-off home run off Dodgers closer Takashi Saito, producing what may have been the most emotional moment of the regular season, turning what seemed like an imminent loss into an improbable victory, and helping propel the team toward an October run. The miracle home run kept the Rockies alive in the bid to win the wild card or perhaps even NL West title. The Rockies eventually clinched the NL wild card, in a 9–8 extra innings victory over the Padres in a wild card tie-breaker game, allowing Helton to appear in the playoffs for the first time in his career. The Rockies kept their run going into October. Having never won a playoff series in their history, the Rockies went on a rampage through the National League, winning every game they played in the NL playoffs, as they marched into the World Series. The team's first playoff opponent was the Philadelphia Phillies, who the Rockies swept in three games in the NL Division Series. Helton hit a triple on the first postseason pitch he ever faced, during the opening game of the NLDS in Philadelphia. In the second round of the playoffs, the Rockies faced the Arizona Diamondbacks, who they swept in four games of the NL Championship Series, sending the Rockies on their first trip to the World Series in franchise history. The Rockies' miracle run ended there, as they went on to lose the World Series to the Boston Red Sox in a four-game sweep.

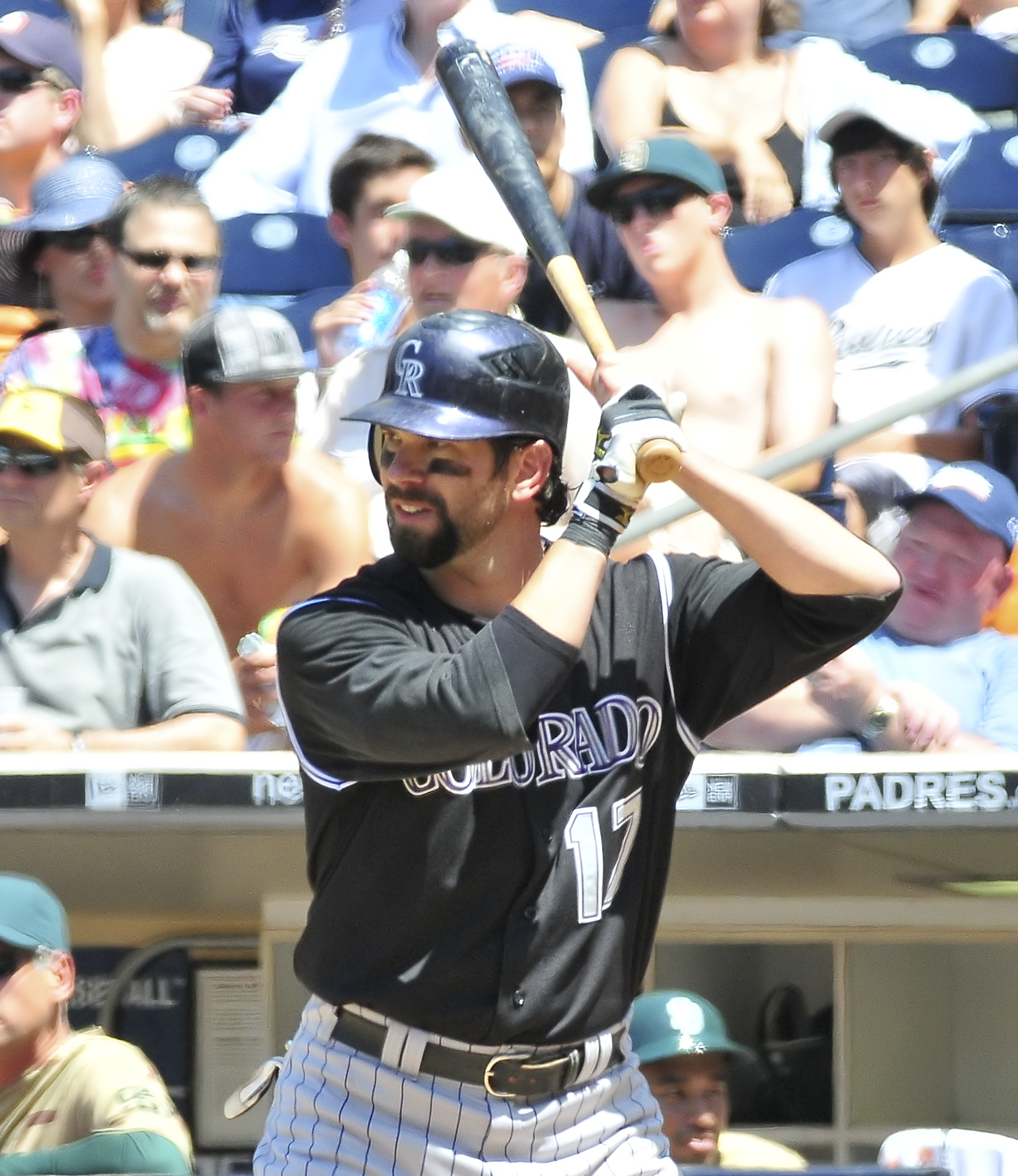
Helton at bat during a game against the San Diego Padres in 2009.

In August 2008, Helton was diagnosed with a degenerative back condition, putting his health and ability to continue play in question. On May 19, 2009, Helton got his 2,000th hit, a single, during an 8–1 road loss to the Atlanta Braves. On July 22, Helton hit his 500th career double in a 4–3 home victory over the Arizona Diamondbacks. He became the 50th player in MLB history to hit 500 career doubles and the fastest to do since 1954. Helton also joined Babe Ruth, Stan Musial, Lou Gehrig and Ted Williams as the only players in MLB history to have at least 500 doubles, 320 home runs and a .325 batting average for a career.

On March 11, 2010, Helton signed a two-year, $9.9 million contract extension, which ran through the 2013 season. Helton's degenerative back condition sent him back to the disabled list in July. He returned from the DL in August and hit .256 with 8 home runs and 37 RBI for the season. After the season, Helton said he would return to the Rockies in 2011, dispelling rumors of a possible retirement. On February 15, 2011, Helton announced his intention to play baseball for three more years, preferably for the Rockies. On June 30 he played his 2,000th career game.

In 2012, Helton continued to deal with what was by now a chronic health issue. On April 14, he drove a 2-run walk-off home run through heavy rain, the seventh walk-off of his career. On July 13, Helton was placed on the 15-day disabled list due to inflammation in his right hip. He had played 63 games to that point, and was batting .235. After returning from the DL, Helton played only 6 games before announcing that he would have season-ending hip surgery in order to prepare for the 2013 season. Helton was healthier in 2013, playing in 124 games, while hitting 15 home runs with 61 RBIs.

On September 14, 2013, Helton announced that he would be retiring at the conclusion of the 2013 season. On September 25, before his last game at Coors Field, Helton was honored by the Rockies in a pre-game ceremony. In the game, Helton hit a home run and drove in three runs versus the Boston Red Sox.

On August 17, 2014, the Rockies retired Helton's number 17 before a game at Coors Field. He was the first Rockies player to have his number retired in the franchise's history.

=== Accomplishments ===
Todd Helton's number 17 was retired by the Colorado Rockies in 2014.

Awards received
Name of award	Times	Dates	Ref
Associated Press Major League Baseball (MLB) Player of the Year	1	2000	
Baseball America All-Rookie team	1	1998	
Colorado Rockies Player of the Year	4	2000−03	
Rockies' Roberto Clemente Man of the Year	2	2000, 2002	
Dick Howser Trophy	1	1995	
Hank Aaron Award	1	2000	
Major League Baseball All-Star	5	2000–2004	
National League (NL) Player of the Month	4	May 2000, August 2000, May 2002, August 2003	
NL Player of the Week	6	June 20, 1999; May 14, 2000; July 23, 2000; August 20, 2000; July 10, 2005; September 25, 2005	
Players Choice Award for National League Outstanding Player	1	2000	
Gold Glove Award at first base	3	2001, 2002, 2004	
Silver Slugger Award at first base	4	2000−03	
Sporting News NL Player of the Year	1	2000	
Sporting News Rookie of the Year	1	1998	
Topps All-Star Rookie team	1	1998	
Walter Fenner "Buck" Leonard Legacy Award	1	2000	

- Baseball Digest All-Star Rookie Team (1998)
- Associated Press MLB All-Star Team (2000)
- Baseball Digest MLB Player of the Year (2000)
- USA Baseball Alumni Player of the Year (2000)

Achievements

- National League (NL) Batting Champion (2000)
- NL slugging percentage leader (2000)
- NL RBI leader (2000)
- NL Doubles leader (2000, Helton hit 59 doubles during the season, which tied Chuck Klein for the third-highest single-season doubles total in NL history.)
- Hit for the cycle (June 19, 1999)
- Percentage triple crown (2000)
- NL hits leader (2000)
- NL on-base percentage leader (2000, 2005, 2007)
- NL total bases leader (2000)
- NL extra base hits leader (2000)
- Colorado Rockies career leader in games played (2,247), at bats (7,962), runs (1,401), hits (2,519), total bases (4,292), doubles (592), home runs (369), RBI (1,406), walks (1,335), and intentional walks (185).
- Colorado Rockies retired Helton's number 17 on August 17, 2014.

Helton first appeared on the National Baseball Hall of Fame ballot in 2019, when he received 16.5% of the vote, well short of the 75% required for election, but above the 5% minimum required to remain on the ballot.

On January 23, 2024, Helton was elected to the Hall of Fame, receiving 79.7% of the vote. He is the second Rockies player, after Larry Walker, to be elected. Helton was formally inducted on July 21, 2024.

== Post-playing career ==
On April 9, 2022, the Colorado Rockies hired Helton as a special assistant to the general manager, joining Vinny Castilla and Clint Hurdle in the role. They and Charlie Blackmon held that role in 2025.

== Personal life ==
Helton came up as a major fan of Chicago Cubs' first baseman Mark Grace, himself a left-handed first baseman who was both a highly successful hitter and also excelled with the glove. Grace was nearing retirement as a player when Helton reached the major leagues. Helton took jersey number 17 as a tribute to Grace, and wore that uniform number for the rest of his career.

Helton, his wife, and their two daughters reside in Knoxville, Tennessee. They previously lived in Brighton, Colorado, but sold their house in 2018. Helton and his family are good friends with Helton's former Tennessee Volunteers football teammate, Hall of Fame quarterback Peyton Manning.

In 2013, Helton was arrested in Colorado for driving under the influence (DUI) of alcohol. He was fined $400, received a year of probation, and was ordered to perform 24 hours of community service. In 2019, Helton was cited for another DUI after crashing his car in Tennessee. He subsequently entered a treatment program. He was sentenced to two days in jail in 2020 after pleading guilty to the DUI.

== See also ==
- List of Colorado Rockies team records
- List of Major League Baseball annual doubles leaders
- List of Major League Baseball annual putouts leaders
- List of Major League Baseball career assists as a first baseman leaders
- List of Major League Baseball career bases on balls leaders
- List of Major League Baseball career batting average leaders
- List of Major League Baseball career doubles leaders
- List of Major League Baseball career hits leaders
- List of Major League Baseball career home run leaders
- List of Major League Baseball career on-base percentage leaders
- List of Major League Baseball career OPS leaders
- List of Major League Baseball career putouts as a first baseman leaders
- List of Major League Baseball career runs batted in leaders
- List of Major League Baseball career runs scored leaders
- List of Major League Baseball career slugging percentage leaders
- List of Major League Baseball career total bases leaders
- List of Major League Baseball doubles records
- List of Major League Baseball players to hit for the cycle
- List of Major League Baseball players who spent their entire career with one franchise
- List of National League annual slugging percentage leaders
- List of people from Knoxville, Tennessee
- List of University of Tennessee people

Awards and achievements
Preceded by Jerry Colquitt	Tennessee Volunteers Starting Quarterbacks; 1994	Succeeded by Peyton Manning
Preceded by Scott Rolen	Sporting News NL Rookie of the Year; 1998	Succeeded by Preston Wilson
Preceded by Dmitri Young	Topps All-Star Rookie First Baseman; 1998	Succeeded by Brian Daubach
Preceded by Vladimir Guerrero; Sammy Sosa; Vladimir Guerrero; Brian Jordan	National League Player of the Month; May 2000; August 2000; May 2002; April 2003	Succeeded by Jeff Kent; Richard Hidalgo; Jeff Kent; Albert Pujols
Preceded by Larry Walker	National League slugging percentage leader 2000	Succeeded by Barry Bonds
Preceded by Jeff Kent	Hitting for the cycle June 19, 1999	Succeeded by Chris Singleton
