= List of Major League Baseball career slugging percentage leaders =

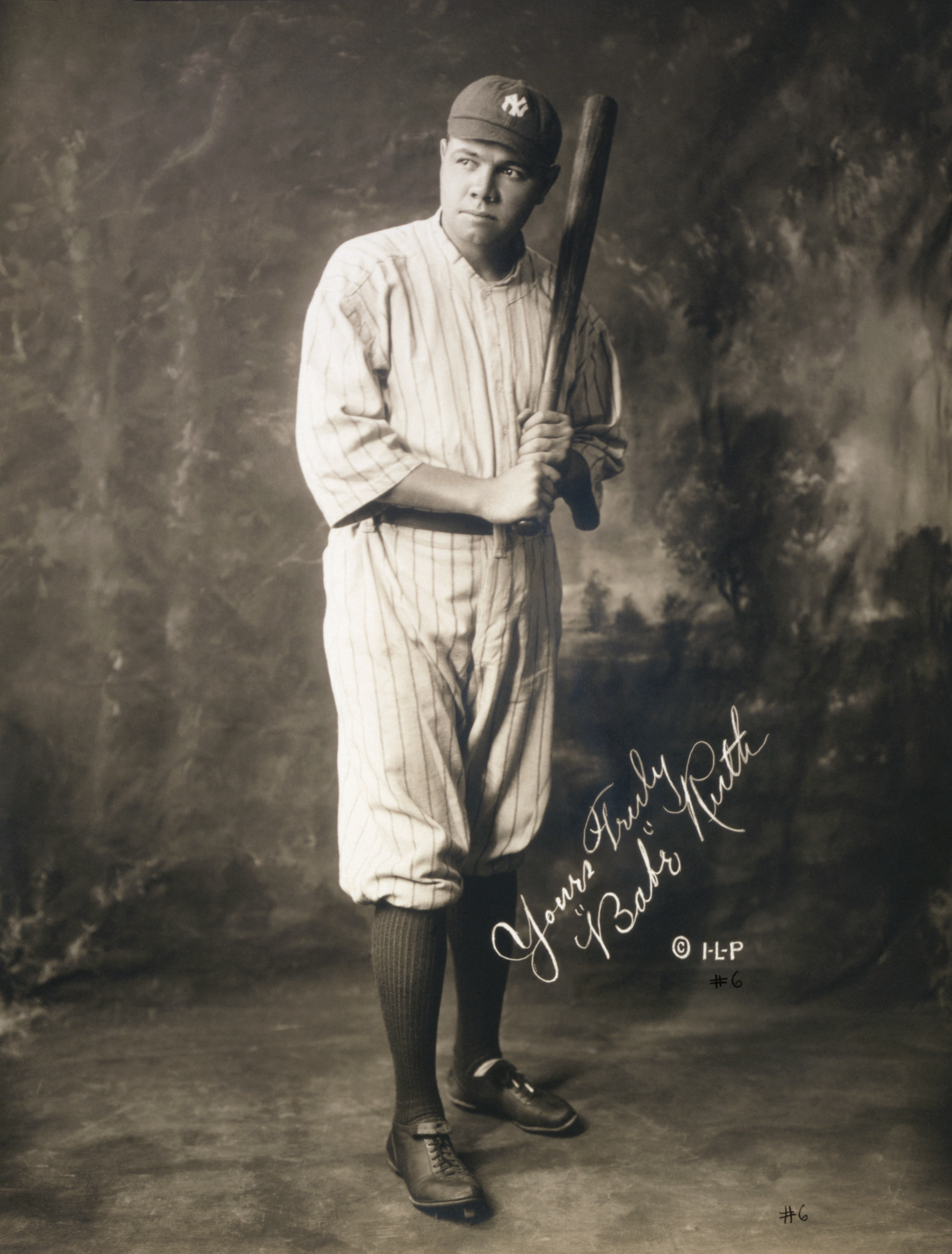
Babe Ruth, the all-time leader in career slugging percentage.

In baseball statistics, slugging percentage (SLG) is a measure of the batting productivity of a hitter. It is calculated as total bases divided by at bats. Unlike batting average, slugging percentage gives more weight to extra-base hits with doubles, triples, and home runs, relative to singles. Plate appearances ending in walks are specifically excluded from this calculation, as an appearance that ends in a walk is not counted as an at-bat.

Among players with at least 3,000 plate appearances, Babe Ruth is the all-time leader with a career slugging percentage of .6897. Ted Williams (.6338), Lou Gehrig (.6324), Mule Suttles (.6179), Turkey Stearnes (.6165), Oscar Charleston (.6145), Jimmie Foxx (.6093), Aaron Judge (.6113), Barry Bonds (.6069), and Hank Greenberg (.6050) are the only other players with a career slugging percentage over .600.

== Key ==
**Rank**	Rank amongst leaders in career slugging percentage. A blank field indicates a tie.
**Player**	Name of the player.
**SLG**	Total career slugging percentage.
*	Denotes elected to National Baseball Hall of Fame.
**Bold**	Denotes active player. (Note: A player is considered inactive if he has announced his retirement or has not played for a full season.)

== List ==
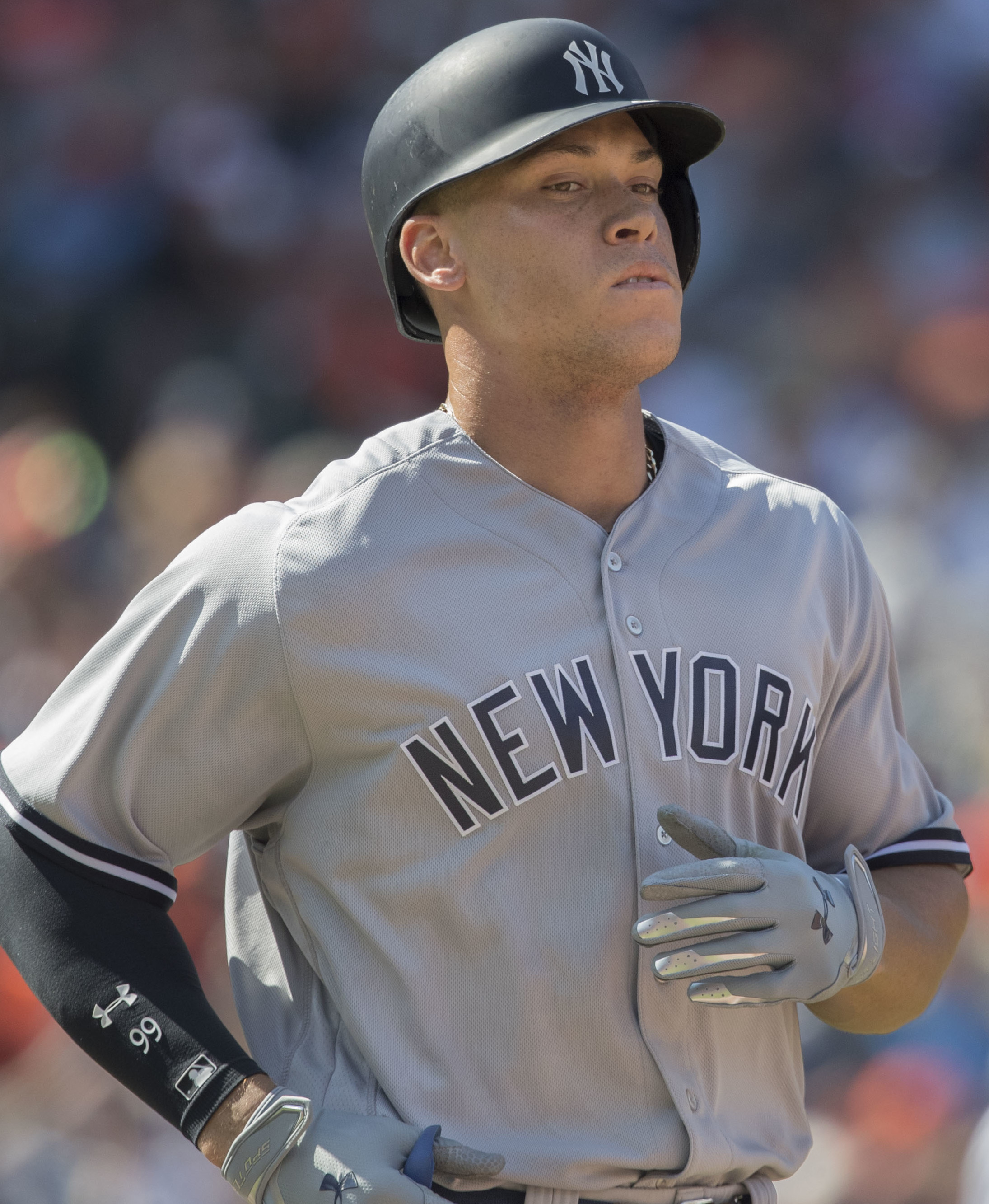
Aaron Judge, the active leader and 7th all-time in career slugging percentage.

- Stats updated as of September 27, 2026.

Rank	Player	SLG
1	Babe Ruth*	.6897
2	Ted Williams*	.6338
3	Lou Gehrig*	.6324
4	Mule Suttles*	.6179
5	Turkey Stearnes*	.6157
6	Oscar Charleston*	.6106
7	**Aaron Judge**	.6096
8	Jimmie Foxx*	.6093
9	Barry Bonds	.6069
10	Hank Greenberg*	.6050
11	Mark McGwire	.5882
12	Manny Ramirez	.5854
13	Joe DiMaggio*	.5788
14	**Yordan Alvarez**	.5781
15	Rogers Hornsby*	.5765
16	**Shohei Ohtani**	.5737
17	Larry Walker*	.5652
18	Albert Belle	.5638
19	Johnny Mize*	.5620
20	Juan González	.5607
21	Stan Musial*	.5591
22	**Mike Trout**	.5582
23	Mickey Mantle*	.5568
24	Willie Mays*	.5566
25	Frank Thomas*	.5549
26	Hank Aaron*	.5545
27	Jim Thome*	.5541
28	Vladimir Guerrero*	.5525
29	David Ortiz*	.5515
30	Alex Rodriguez	.5502
31	Ralph Kiner*	.5479
32	Carlos Delgado	.5459
33	Mike Piazza*	.5452
34	Hack Wilson*	.5447
35	Albert Pujols	.5438
36	Chuck Klein*	.5430
37	Jeff Bagwell*	.5403
38	Duke Snider*	.5397
39	Todd Helton*	.5391
40	Ken Griffey Jr.*	.5378
41	Frank Robinson*	.5370
42	Lance Berkman	.5369
43	Willie Wells*	.5355
44	Al Simmons*	.5349
45	Sammy Sosa	.5338
46	Dick Allen*	.5336
	Earl Averill*	.5336
48	Mel Ott*	.5331
49	Ryan Braun	.5323
50	Babe Herman	.5319

Rank	Player	SLG
	Lefty O'Doul	.5319
52	Ken Williams	.5304
53	**Juan Soto**	.5297
54	Chipper Jones*	.5293
55	Willie Stargell*	.5286
56	Mike Schmidt*	.5273
57	Jim Edmonds	.5271
58	**Giancarlo Stanton**	.5266
59	Chick Hafey*	.5261
60	Jud Wilson*	.5237
61	Mo Vaughn	.5231
62	Wally Berger	.5216
	Hal Trosky	.5216
64	Nomar Garciaparra	.5206
65	Harry Heilmann*	.5205
66	Dan Brouthers*	.5201
67	Kevin Mitchell	.5198
68	Miguel Cabrera	.5183
69	Charlie Keller	.5177
70	Shoeless Joe Jackson	.5174
71	**Pete Alonso**	.5168
72	Jason Giambi	.5164
73	**Bryce Harper**	.5161
74	**Ronald Acuña Jr.**	.5157
	Moisés Alou	.5157
	Josh Hamilton	.5157
77	**J. D. Martinez**	.5156
78	Edgar Martínez*	.5155
79	Ryan Howard	.5152
80	Willie McCovey*	.5147
81	José Canseco	.5145
	Rafael Palmeiro	.5145
83	Gary Sheffield	.5139
84	Nelson Cruz	.5129
85	Ty Cobb*	.5117
86	Joey Votto	.5110
87	Ellis Burks	.5104
88	Matt Holliday	.5102
89	Eddie Mathews*	.5094
	Mark Teixeira	.5094
91	Fred McGriff*	.5091
92	Jeff Heath	.5088
93	Harmon Killebrew*	.5085
94	**Rafael Devers**	.5084
95	**Mookie Betts**	.5080
96	**Matt Olson**	.5071
97	Richie Sexson	.5069
98	Bob Johnson	.5059
	Bill Terry*	.5059
100	Prince Fielder	.5056

== Sources ==
- "Career Leaders & Records for Slugging %". Baseball-Reference.com.
