= Vargas (surname) =

- Place of origin: Spain

Vargas is a noble Spanish surname of Castilian origin. The founder of the house was Iván de Martin who fought as a knight in the reconquest of Madrid, in 1083, in the service of Alfonso VI of León and Castile. Descendants of this family now live across Spain and the Americas. The ancestral home is found in Riocorvo, Cantabria.

== Geographical distribution ==
As of 2014, 22.2% of all known bearers of the surname Vargas were residents of Mexico. Listing of frequency:

- Mexico 22.2% (frequency 1:260)
- Colombia 15.6% (1:142)
- Peru, 7.5% (1:196)
- United States, 6.7% (1:2,502)
- Bolivia, 6.4% (1:77)
- Venezuela, 6.2% (1:225)
- Chile, 4.5% (1:183)
- Costa Rica, 4.3% (1:51)
- Brazil, 4.2% (1:2,249)
- Argentina, 3.9% (1:511)
- Philippines, 3.2% (1:1,457)
- Dominican Republic, 2.7% (1:182)
- Spain, 2.5% (1:863)
- Ecuador, 2.5% (1:295)
- Guatemala, 1.5% (1:498)
- Nicaragua, 1.2% (1:237).

In Spain, the frequency of the surname was higher than national average (1:863) in the following autonomous communities:

1. Andalusia (1:419)
2. Extremadura (1:445)
3. Balearic Islands (1:781)
4. Canary Islands (1:812)
5. Community of Madrid (1:850)

In Costa Rica, the frequency of the surname was higher than national average (1:51) in the following provinces:

1. Heredia Province (1:40)
2. Alajuela Province (1:41)
3. San José Province (1:49)

== Acting ==
- Alfred Vargas (born 1979), Filipino actor
- Elizabeth Vargas (born 1962), ABC News anchor
- Iêda Maria Vargas (1944–2025), Brazilian actress and beauty queen
- Jacob Vargas (born 1971), Mexican-American actor
- Sibila Vargas (born 1968), CNN reporter
- Taliana Vargas (born 1987), Colombian First Runner up in Miss Universe 2008
- Tuesday Vargas (born 1980), Filipino actress, singer and comedian
- Valentina Vargas (born 1964), Chilean actress
- Vic Vargas (1939–2003), Filipino film actor

== Finance ==
- Victor Vargas (born 1952), lawyer and owner of the Banco Occidental de Descuento
- Marie Marguerite, Duchess of Anjou (born 1983), born María Margarita de Vargas y Santaella

== Music and arts ==
- Alberto Vargas (1896–1982), Peruvian painter of pin-up girls and erotica
- Álvaro Vargas Llosa (born 1966), Peruvian writer, son of Mario Vargas Llosa
- Andrés de Vargas (c. 1610–1674), Spanish painter
- Carlos Vargas (singer) (born 1984), American Dominican bachata singer
- Chavela Vargas (1919–2012), Costa Rican singer
- Eugenia Vargas, Chilean artist
- Fred Vargas (born 1957), French writer
- Gabriel Vargas (disambiguation), list of people with the name
- Jose Antonio Vargas (born 1981), Filipino-American journalist
- José María Vargas (historian) (1902–1988), Ecuadorian friar and writer
- Luis de Vargas (1502–1568), Spanish painter of the late-Renaissance period
- Mario Vargas Llosa (1936–2025), Peruvian writer, politician and Nobel Prize laureate
- Mary Belle de Vargas (1902–1946), American artist
- Mónica Vargas Celis, Mexican film and television producer
- Pedro Vargas (1906–1989), Mexican singer
- Vania Vargas (born 1978), Guatemalan poet, narrator, editor, and journalist
- Wilfrido Vargas (born 1949), Dominican musician
- Antonio Vargas Cortés, Spanish male flamenco singer

== Politics ==
- Alfred Vargas (born 1979), Filipino politician and congressman of 5th district, Quezon City from 2013 to 2022
- Antonio Vargas (1958–2025), Ecuadorian politician and indigenous Quechua leader
- Carlos Ayala Vargas (born 1980), Spanish politician
- Cortés Vargas (1883–1954), Colombian general
- Danny Vargas Serrano (born 1979), member of the Legislative Assembly of Costa Rica
- Diego Vargas Castillo (born 2000), Chilean politician
- Diego de Vargas (1603–1704), Spanish viceroy of New Spain
- Dior Vargas American Latina feminist mental health activist
- Francisco de Vargas, Paraguayan lawyer and minister
- Getúlio Vargas (1882–1954), Brazilian president
- Gloria Maira Vargas (born 1958), Chilean economist and politician
- José Augusto Vargas (born 1962), Peruvian congressman
- José María Vargas (1786–1854), Venezuelan president
- Juan Vargas (born 1961), American politician from California
- Julián García Vargas, Spanish politician
- Lammis Vargas, American politician from Rhode Island
- Miguel Vargas Maldonado (born 1950), Dominican politician
- Patrick Michael Vargas (born 1982), Filipino politician and congressman of 5th district, Quezon City since 2022
- Rafael Rodríguez Vargas, Puerto Rican politician
- Tony Vargas (born 1984), American politician from Nebraska
- Virgilio Barco Vargas (1921–1997), Colombian president

== Religion ==
- Juan Vargas Aruquipa (born 1947), Bolivian Roman Catholic bishop

== Sciences ==
- Mario Vargas Vidal (born 1963), Chilean biologist
- Virginia Vargas (born 1945), Peruvian sociologist and women's movement leader

== Sports ==
- Akeem Vargas (born 1990), German basketball player
- Annerys Vargas (born 1981), Dominican Republic volleyball player
- Antonio Vargas (born 1996), American professional boxer
- Carlos Vargas (baseball) (born 1999), Dominican baseball player
- Carlos Vargas (cyclist) (born 1997), Colombian para-cyclist
- Carlos Vargas (footballer) (born 1999), Mexican footballer
- Claudio Vargas (born 1978), Vaqueros Laguna pitcher
- Claudio David Vargas Villalba (born 1985), Paraguayan footballer
- Debbie Green-Vargas (born 1958), women's volleyball setter
- Eduardo Vargas (born 1989), Chilean footballer
- Eleucadia Vargas (born 1970), Dominican Republic judoka
- Emiliana Vargas (born 2009), Colombian rhythmic gymnast
- Fabián Andrés Vargas (born 1980), Colombian footballer
- Fernando Vargas (born 1977), boxer
- Freddy Vargas (born 1982), Venezuelan road cyclist
- Gonzalo Vargas (born 1981), Uruguayan footballer
- Gregorio Vargas (born 1970), Mexican boxer
- Gregory Vargas (born 1986), Venezuelan basketball player
- Ildemaro Vargas (born 1991), Venezuelan baseball player
- Jason Vargas (born 1983), American baseball player
- Juan Manuel Vargas (born 1983), Peruvian footballer
- Jefferson Vargas (born 1984), Colombian road cyclist
- Jorge Francisco Vargas (born 1976), Chilean footballer
- Kennys Vargas (born 1990), Puerto Rican professional baseball player
- Melissa Vargas (born 1999), Cuban-born, Turkish volleyballer
- Miguel Vargas (baseball) (born 1999), Cuban baseball player
- Miguel Rodrigo Vargas (born 1978), Portuguese footballer
- Orestes Rodríguez Vargas (1943–2024), Peruvian and Spanish chess grandmaster
- Óscar Vargas (cyclist) (born 1964), Colombian road cyclist
- Nélson Vargas (born 1974), Colombian road cyclist
- Rodrigo Vargas (disambiguation)
- Ronald Vargas (born 1986), Venezuelan footballer
- Rubén Vargas (born 1998), Swiss footballer
- Ryan Vargas (born 2000), American racing driver
- Tetelo Vargas (1906–1971), Dominican Republic baseball player

== Crime ==
- Dorángel Vargas (born 1957), Venezuelan serial killer and cannibal
- Leonidas Vargas (1949–2009), Colombian drug lord
- Nabor Vargas García (born 1976), Mexican drug lord

== See also ==
- Vargas (disambiguation)
