= Vargas =

Vargas may refer to:

== People ==
- Vargas (surname), including a list of people with this surname
- Getúlio Vargas, 14th and 17th President of Brazil
  - Getúlio Vargas, Rio Grande do Sul, a Brazilian municipality
- "Vargas", also "Varga", signature on works by Peruvian painter of pin-ups Alberto Vargas
- Vargas and Lagola, a Swedish songwriting, production and artist duo
  - Vincent Pontare, professionally known as Vargas; Swedish songwriter, producer, and singer

== Places ==
- Vargas, Cantabria, Spain
- Vargas, former name of La Guaira State, Venezuela
  - Vargas Municipality
  - Vargas tragedy, a natural disaster in 1999

== Fictional characters ==
- Miguel Vargas, 1958 film Touch of Evil character
- Rocco Vargas, 1986 science-fiction comic-book series by Daniel Torres
- Vargas, 1994 boss from video game Final Fantasy VI
- Edgar Vargas, 1995 character in Johnny the Homicidal Maniac
- Vargas (comics), 2001 Marvel Comics character
- Vargas, a vampire from the 2025 Disney Channel film Zombies 4: Dawn of the Vampires
- Vargas, 2016 character from game Uncharted 4: A Thief's End
- Feliciano Vargas and Romano Vargas, personifications of Italy in the 2009 anime Hetalia

== See also ==
- Varga (disambiguation)
- Varda (disambiguation)
- de Vargas (family named)
