= List of Major League Baseball batting champions =

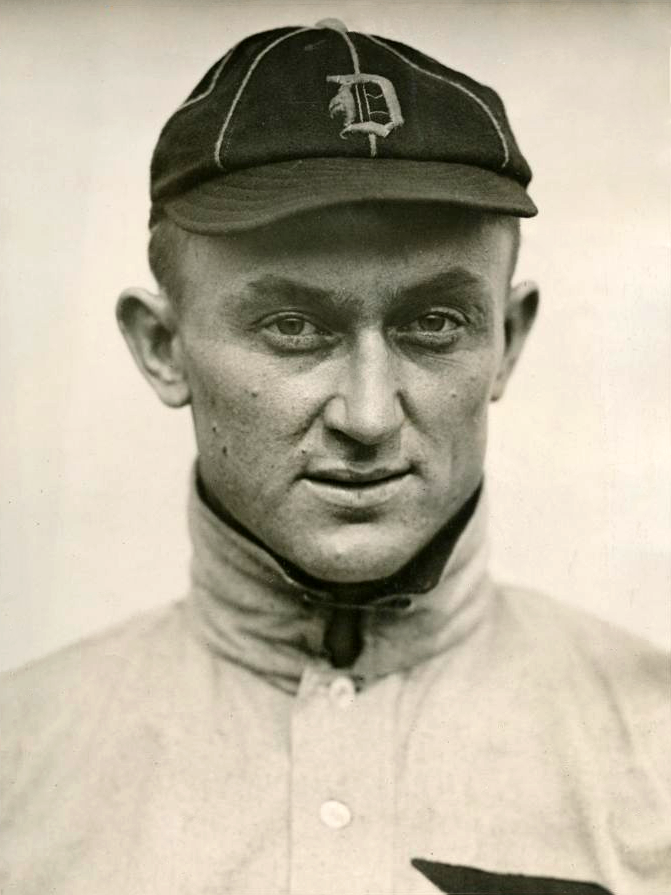
Ty Cobb won more batting titles than any other player, 11 or 12; the precise number is unclear because of a dispute about the 1910 title.

In the sport of baseball, batting average is a measure of a batter's success rate in achieving a hit during an at bat. A batting average is calculated by dividing a player's hits by his at bats. In Major League Baseball, a player in each league^{[L]} wins the batting title for having the highest batting average each season. This article presents a list of players who have been so recognized as "batting champions".

== Background ==
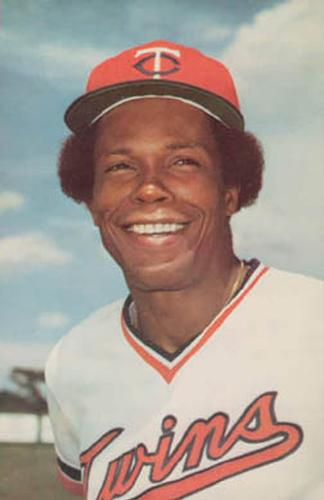
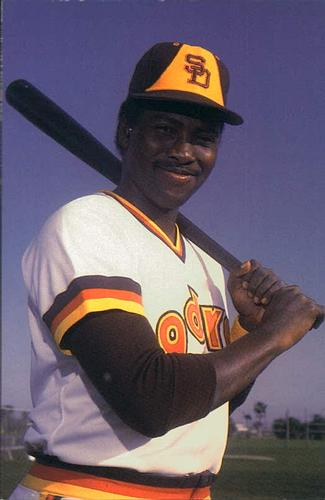
Rod Carew (left) and Tony Gwynn

=== Awards ===
The American League (AL) winner is known as the "Rod Carew American League Batting Champion", while the National League (NL) leader is designated the "Tony Gwynn National League Batting Champion". At the 2016 MLB All-Star Game, MLB announced that the AL and NL batting champions would henceforth be named in honor of Rod Carew and Tony Gwynn, respectively. Gwynn won all eight titles in the NL with the San Diego Padres, while Carew was a seven-time AL batting champion, all with the Minnesota Twins.

=== Criteria ===
Since 1957, a player must have 3.1 plate appearances (PA) per scheduled game in that league (for a total of 502 over the current 162-game season) to qualify for the batting title in Major League Baseball (MLB).

If a player's lead in average (AVG) is sufficiently large that enough hitless at bats (ABs) can be added to reach this requirement and the player still would have the highest batting average, he wins the title. Tony Gwynn, for example, had 159 hits in 451 ABs in 1996 (.353 average) but only 498 PAs. Gwynn's batting average would have dropped to .349 (159 hits in 455 ABs) with four hitless ABs added to reach the 502 PA requirement—as such, Gwynn's average would still have been higher than other eligible players (Ellis Burks finished second, with a .344 average), thus Gwynn was awarded the 1996 batting title for the National League.

=== Other recognized leagues ===
There are several other historical leagues that are also considered to have had "major" status by MLB, and their statistics are recognized as such. Three such leagues operated in the late 19th century: the American Association (1882–1891), Union Association (1884), and Players' League (1890). A fourth, the Federal League, operated during 1914 and 1915.

In December 2020, MLB announced that the records of Negro league baseball from 1920 to 1948 would be designated as major-league status. From 2020 to 2024, MLB and the Elias Sports Bureau completed a comprehensive review of the Seamheads.com database in coordination with Retrosheet. The MLB database combines statistics from the Negro leagues with existing data from the AL, NL, and other historical major leagues. MLB officially incorporated relevant Negro league statistics into its record book in 2024.

== History ==
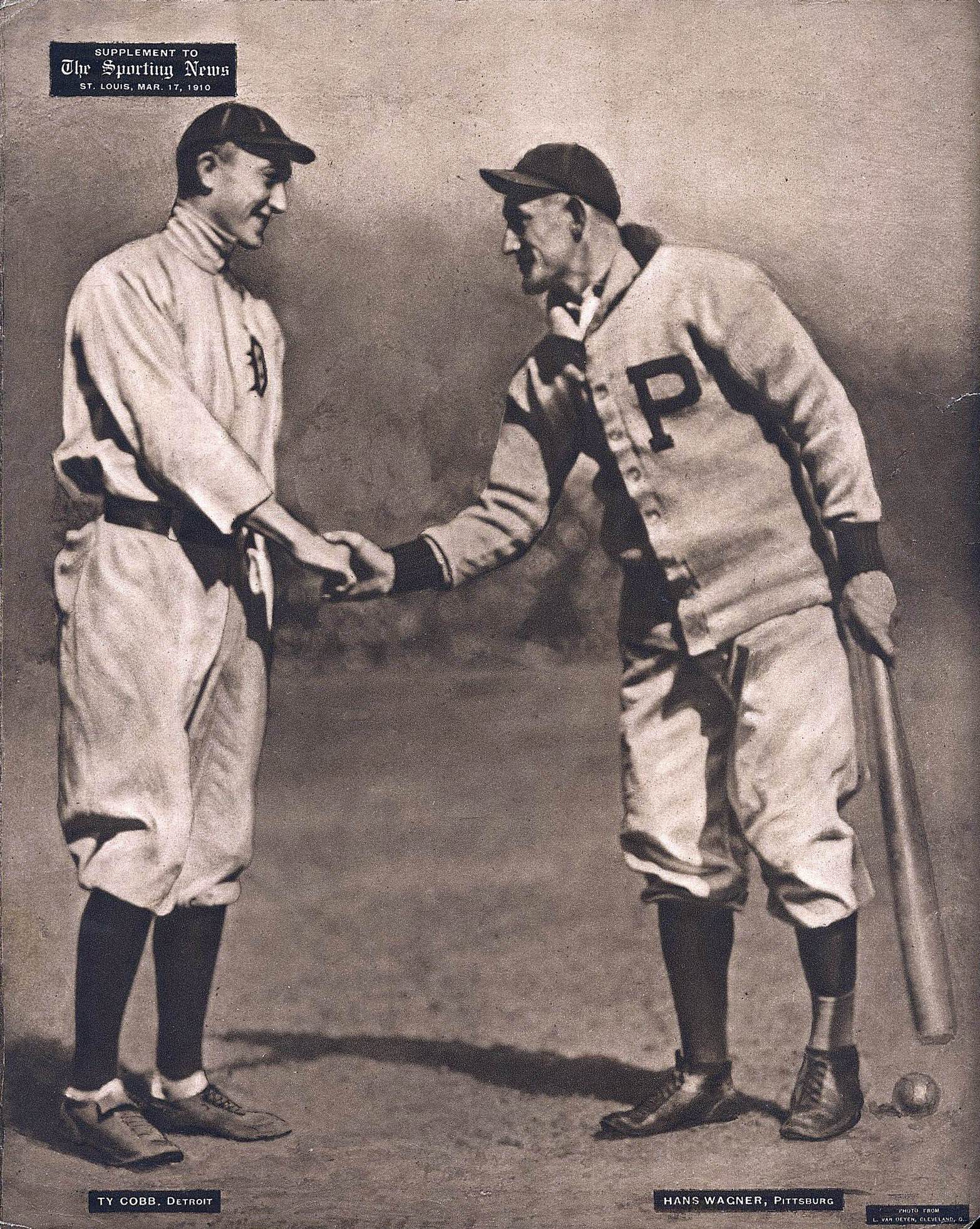
Ty Cobb (left) and Honus Wagner in 1909

The first batting average champion in the NL was Ross Barnes; in the league's inaugural 1876 season, Barnes batted .429 for the Chicago White Stockings. The AL was established in 1901, and Hall of Fame second baseman Nap Lajoie led that league with a .426 average for the Philadelphia Athletics.

Ty Cobb of the Detroit Tigers led the AL in average in 11 (or 12) seasons. Honus Wagner and Gwynn are tied for the second-most titles, with eight apiece in the NL. It is unclear whether Lajoie or Cobb won the 1910 AL title, with some sources attributing the title to each man.^{[1910]} If Cobb is credited with the 1910 title, he won 9 consecutive titles from 1907 to 1915 and 12 total titles for his career. Otherwise, Rogers Hornsby won the most consecutive titles, with six from 1920 to 1925. Without the 1910 title, Cobb still led the league in five consecutive seasons from 1911 to 1915. Cobb holds the record for highest average in two and three consecutive seasons (.414 from 1911 to 1912 and .408 from 1911 to 1913), but Hornsby holds the record for four and five consecutive seasons (.404 from 1922 to 1925 and .402 from 1921 to 1925). Wagner, Rod Carew, Wade Boggs, and Gwynn each won four consecutive titles. Lajoie also had a streak of four league-leading seasons from 1901 to 1904, if he is credited with the contested AL title in 1902.^{[1902]}

Under the current 3.1 PA qualification, players have posted a .400 batting average for a season 28 times. Ted Williams' .4057 in 1941 is the most recent such season, one of 13 to occur since 1900. George Brett in 1980 is the only player to maintain a .400 average into September since 1941. Additionally, only Brett and John Olerud in 1993 maintained such an average into August. With the modern scarcity of .400 hitters, recent players who have been above .400 early in the season, such as Chipper Jones in 2008, have drawn significant attention in the media. Brett's .390 in 1980 and Gwynn's .394 in 1994 are the only seasons in which a player reached .390 since 1941.

Carl Yastrzemski's .301 in the 1968 American League was the lowest batting average ever to lead a league. In 2025, Trea Turner of the Philadelphia Phillies captured the National League batting title with a .304 average – the lowest mark ever for an NL champion. Turner edged out Tony Gwynn’s previous NL low of .313 in 1988. Only three batting champions accomplished the feat without hitting a home run: Willie Keeler in 1897, Zack Wheat in 1918, and Rod Carew in 1972. Joe Mauer's 2006 title made him the first catcher to ever win an AL batting title, and his third title in 2009 surpassed Ernie Lombardi's previous record of two titles for a catcher in any league.

=== Winning margins ===
The closest finish in a batting race came in 1945 when Snuffy Stirnweiss batted .309, topping Tony Cuccinello's .308 average for the American League title by .00008. George Kell beat out Williams in 1949 by .00015. The closest race in the National League came in 2003 when Albert Pujols held off Todd Helton on the last day of the season by .00022. The closest National League race before that was in 1931 with Chick Hafey edging out Bill Terry by .00028.

Lajoie's .426 average in 1901 was 86 points higher than runner-up Mike Donlin's .340, the largest margin of victory for a batting champion. Cap Anson's .399 in 1881 was 71 points higher than Joe Start in 1881, the widest margin in the National League.

=== Champions of two leagues ===
In 2020, D.J. LeMahieu of the New York Yankees won the AL batting title, thereby becoming the first player to definitively win batting titles in both the American and National Leagues; he had also won the NL batting title in 2016 as a member of the Colorado Rockies. However, Ed Delahanty would have that distinction if he is credited with the disputed 1902 American League title, as he was also the 1899 National League champion.

The only other player to win titles in multiple leagues was Pete Browning, who won American Association titles in 1882 and 1885, along with the lone Players' League championship in 1890. Barnes and Deacon White each won National Association and National League titles, but the National Association is not regarded as an official league.^{[L]} In addition, Oscar Charleston won batting championships in the Negro National League and Eastern Colored League. In 1921, Charleston posted a career-best batting average of .434 with the St. Louis Giants.

=== Champions with multiple teams ===
In 1990, Willie McGee posted a .335 average over 542 at-bats in the NL for the St. Louis Cardinals before being traded to the Oakland Athletics of the AL on August 29. Although McGee finished the season in the AL, he had enough PA's in the NL to qualify for the NL batting title, which he won narrowly over Eddie Murray's .330. However, McGee batted .274 that season in the AL, bringing down his overall average to .324; this allowed Murray to lead the major leagues in batting average, yet he did not win a batting title.

In 2024, Luis Arráez became the first player in major-league history to win a batting title with three different teams, and in three consecutive seasons: Minnesota Twins (AL) in 2022; Miami Marlins (NL) in 2023; and San Diego Padres (NL) in 2024. Arráez played 33 games with the Miami Marlins and 117 games with the San Diego Padres in 2024, resulting in a .314 average, with a combined 200 hits in 637 at-bats.

== List of batting champions ==
=== Key ===
Winner	Player with the highest batting average (AVG) in the league
AVG	The winner's batting average
Runner-up	Player with the second-highest batting average in the league
2nd AVG	The runner-up's batting average
League	Denoted for players in the Negro leagues table
†	Member of the National Baseball Hall of Fame and Museum

=== National League ===
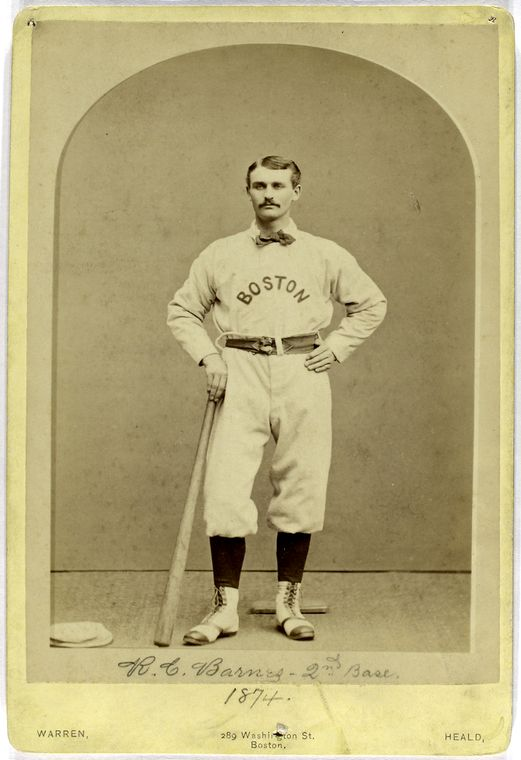
Ross Barnes' .429 in 1876 set a single-season record that stood for a decade.

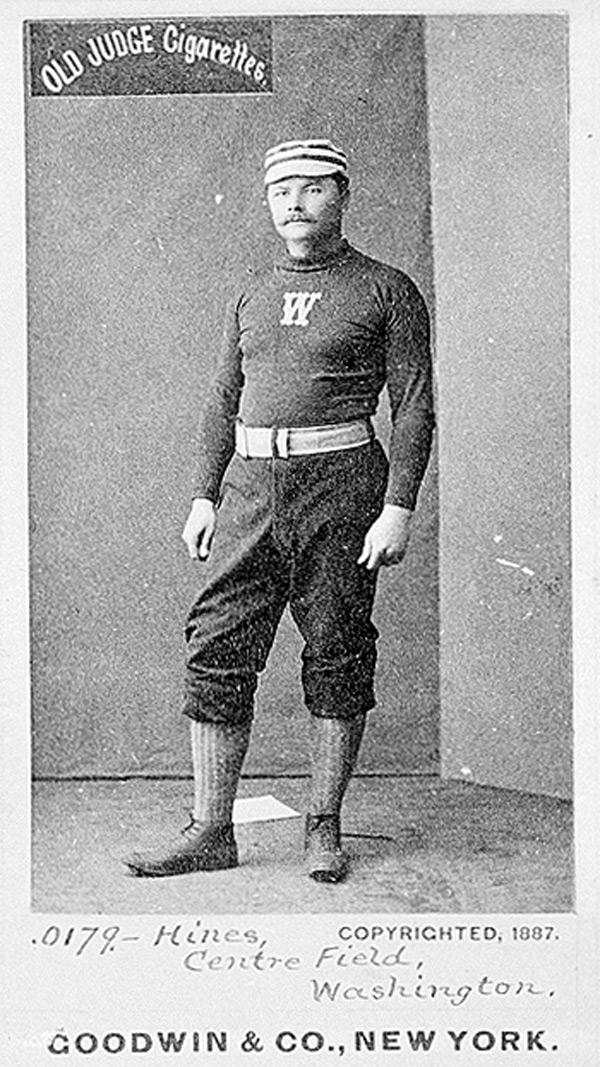
Paul Hines won two consecutive NL batting titles in 1878 and 1879.

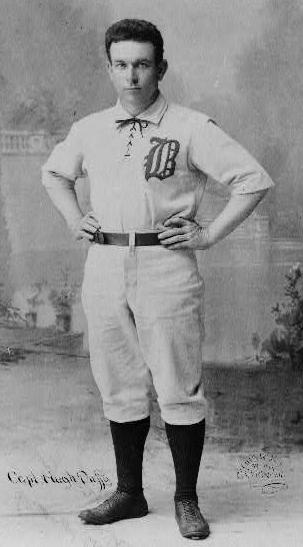
Hugh Duffy set the current single-season record when he batted .440 in 1894.

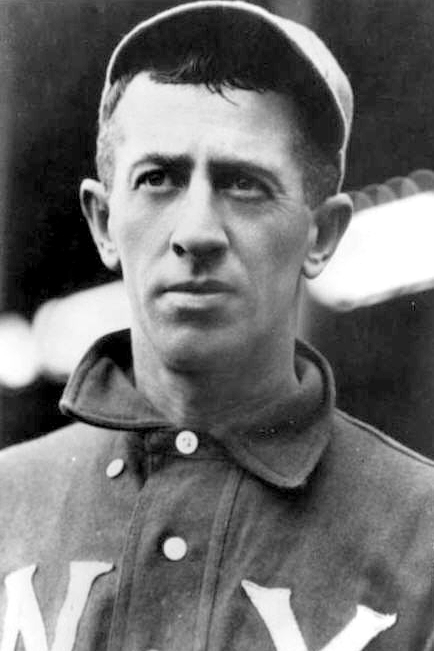
Willie Keeler won two consecutive NL batting titles in 1897 and 1898.

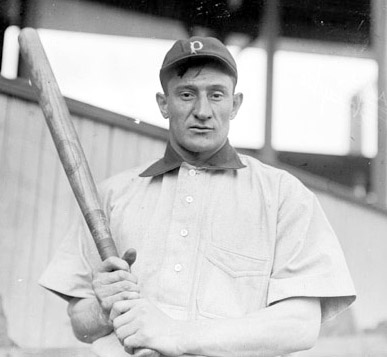
Honus Wagner was the first batter to win eight NL batting titles and won four consecutive titles during that run.

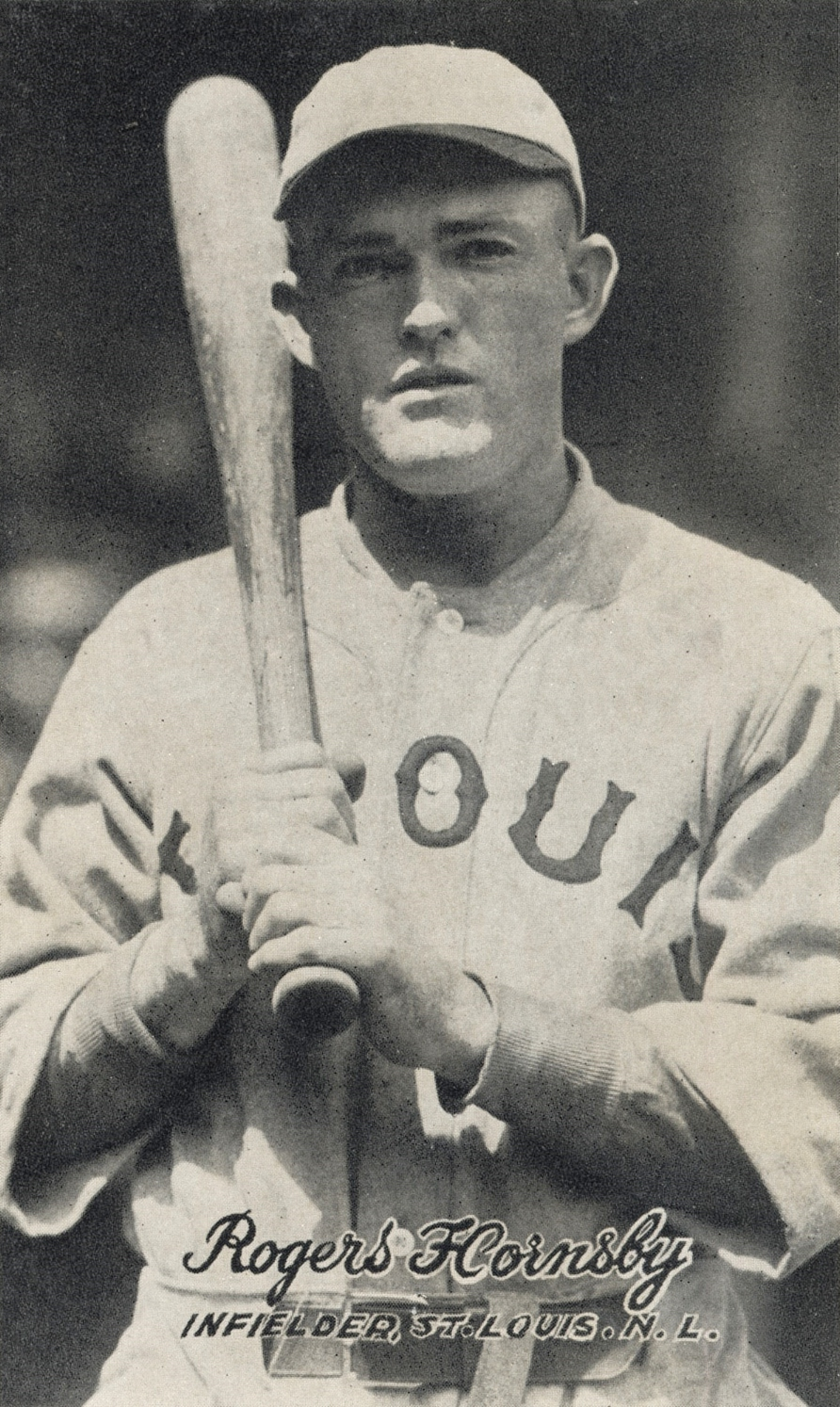
Rogers Hornsby won seven NL batting titles, including six consecutively from 1920 to 1925.

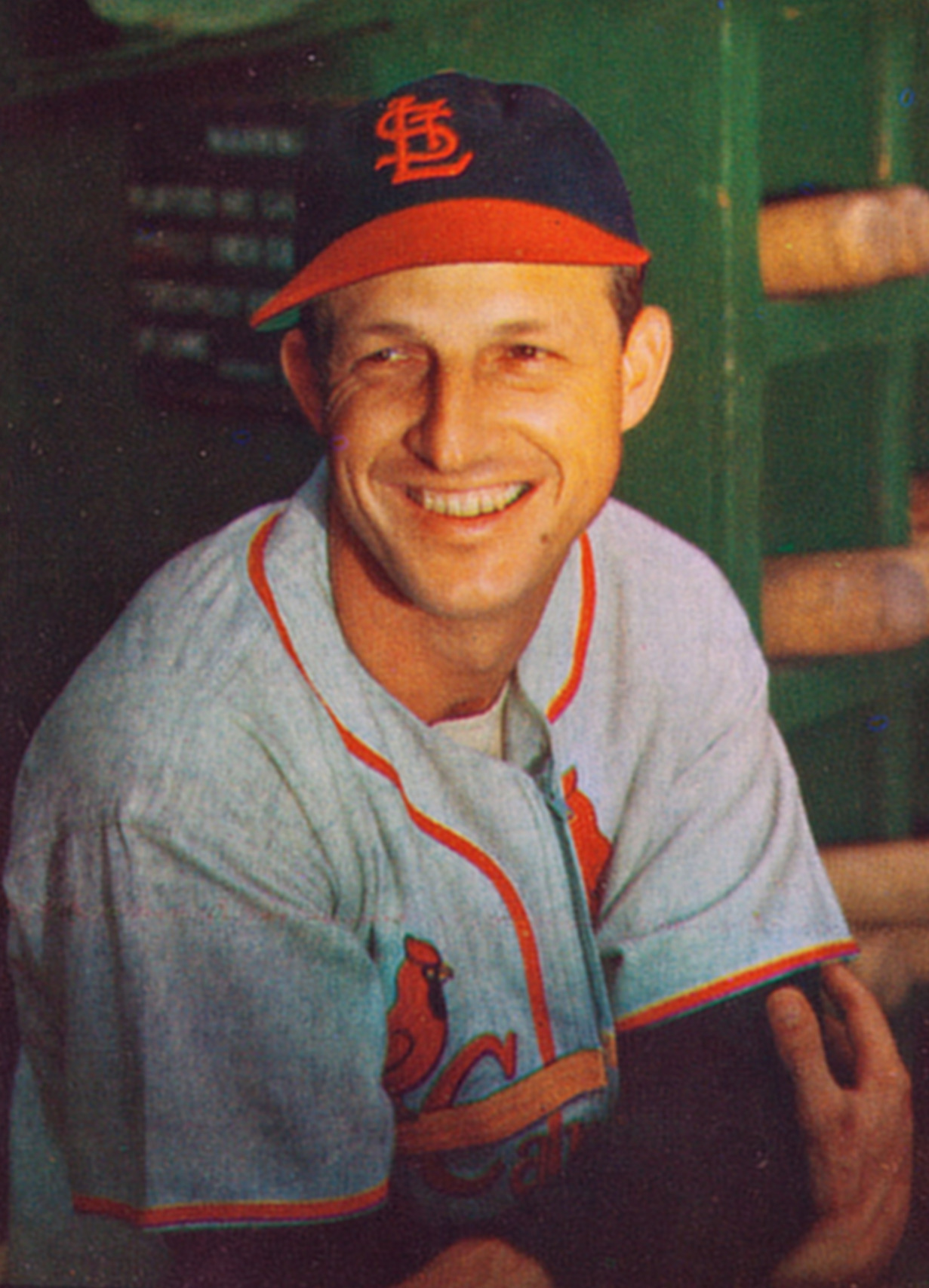
Stan Musial won seven NL batting titles from 1943 to 1957.

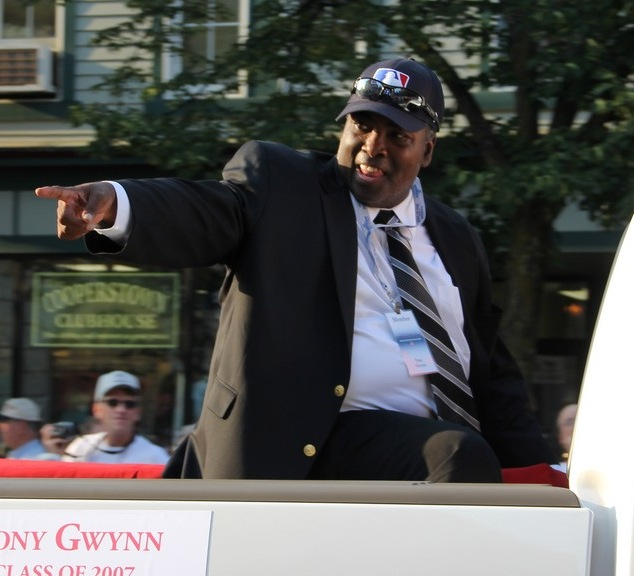
Tony Gwynn won a record-tying eight NL batting titles from 1984 to 1997.

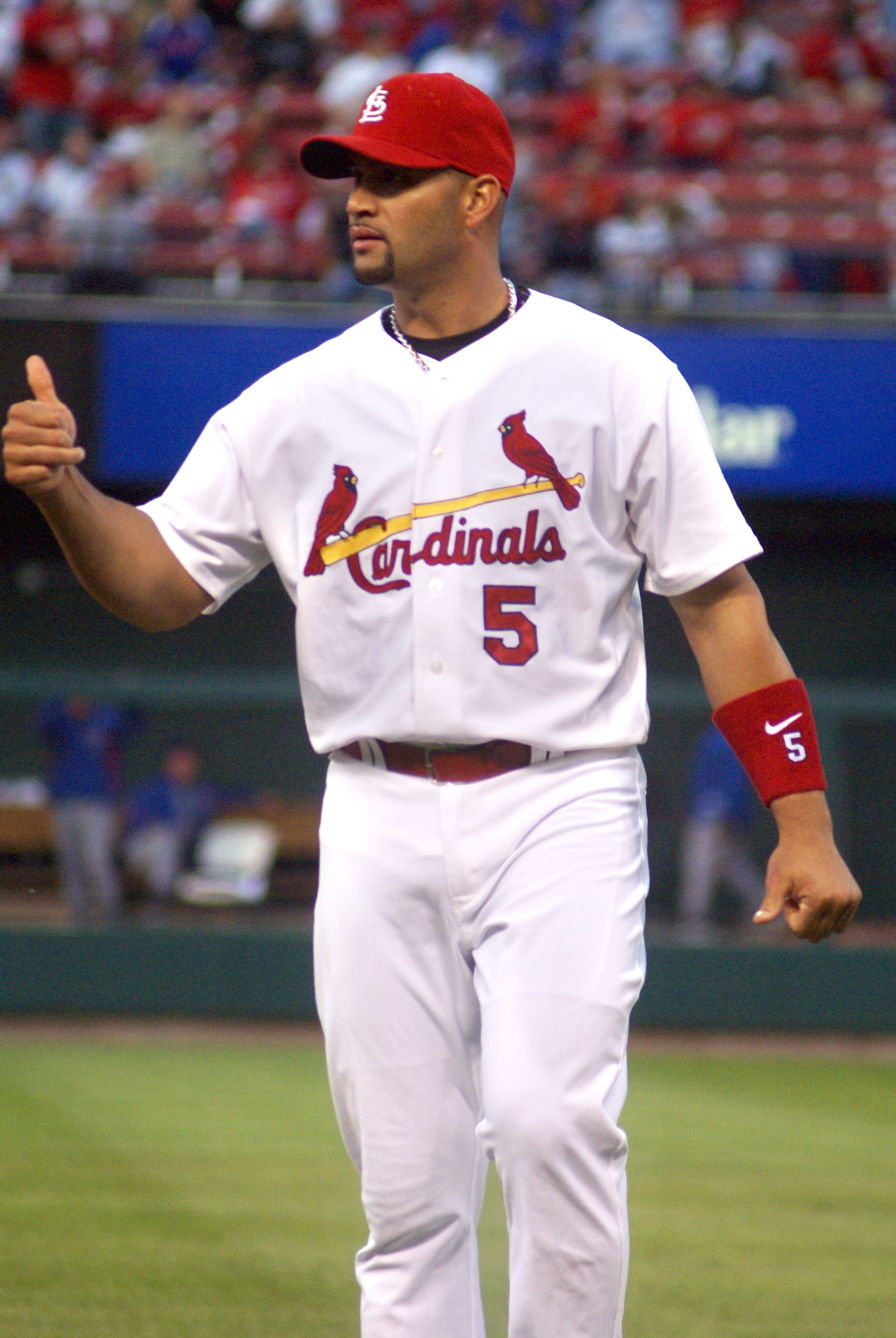
Albert Pujols won the closest NL batting race in 2003.

Year	Winner	AVG	Team(s)	Runner-up	2nd AVG	Ref
1876	Ross Barnes	.429	Chicago White Stockings	George Hall	.366	
1877	Deacon White^{†}	.387	Boston Red Caps	John Cassidy	.378	
1878	Paul Hines	.358	Providence Grays	Abner Dalrymple	.354	
1879	Paul Hines	.357	Providence Grays	Jim O'Rourke^{†}	.348	
1880	George Gore	.360	Chicago White Stockings	Cap Anson^{†}	.337	
1881	Cap Anson^{†}	.399	Chicago White Stockings	Martin Powell	.338	
1882	Dan Brouthers^{†}	.368	Buffalo Bisons	Cap Anson^{†}	.362	
1883	Dan Brouthers^{†}	.374	Buffalo Bisons	Roger Connor^{†}	.357	
1884	King Kelly^{†}	.354	Chicago White Stockings	Jim O'Rourke^{†}	.347	
1885	Roger Connor^{†}	.371	New York Giants	Dan Brouthers^{†}	.359	
1886	King Kelly^{†}	.388	Chicago White Stockings	Cap Anson^{†}	.371	
1887	Sam Thompson^{†}	.372	Detroit Wolverines	Cap Anson^{†}	.347	
1888	Cap Anson^{†}	.344	Chicago White Stockings	Jimmy Ryan	.332	
1889	Dan Brouthers^{†}	.373	Boston Beaneaters	Jack Glasscock	.352	
1890	Jack Glasscock	.336	New York Giants	Billy Hamilton^{†}	.325	
1891	Billy Hamilton^{†}	.340	Philadelphia Phillies	Bug Holliday	.319	
1892	Dan Brouthers^{†}	.335	Brooklyn Grooms	Billy Hamilton^{†}	.330	
1893	Billy Hamilton^{†}	.380	Philadelphia Phillies	Sam Thompson^{†}	.370	
1894	Hugh Duffy^{†}	.440	Boston Beaneaters	Tuck Turner	.418	
1895	Jesse Burkett^{†}	.405	Cleveland Spiders	Ed Delahanty^{†}	.404	
1896	Jesse Burkett^{†}	.410	Cleveland Spiders	Hughie Jennings^{†}	.401	
1897	Willie Keeler^{†}	.424	Baltimore Orioles	Fred Clarke^{†}	.390	
1898	Willie Keeler^{†}	.385	Baltimore Orioles	Billy Hamilton^{†}	.369	
1899	Ed Delahanty^{†}	.410	Philadelphia Phillies	Jesse Burkett^{†}	.396	
1900	Honus Wagner^{†}	.381	Pittsburgh Pirates	Elmer Flick^{†}	.367	
1901	Jesse Burkett^{†}	.376	St. Louis Cardinals	Ed Delahanty^{†}	.354	
1902	Ginger Beaumont	.357	Pittsburgh Pirates	Sam Crawford^{†}	.333	
1903	Honus Wagner^{†}	.355	Pittsburgh Pirates	Fred Clarke^{†}	.351	
1904	Honus Wagner^{†}	.349	Pittsburgh Pirates	Mike Donlin	.329	
1905	Cy Seymour	.377	Cincinnati Reds	Honus Wagner^{†}	.363	
1906	Honus Wagner^{†}	.339	Pittsburgh Pirates	Harry Steinfeldt	.327	
1907	Honus Wagner^{†}	.350	Pittsburgh Pirates	Sherry Magee	.328	
1908	Honus Wagner^{†}	.354	Pittsburgh Pirates	Mike Donlin	.334	
1909	Honus Wagner^{†}	.339	Pittsburgh Pirates	Mike Mitchell	.310	
1910	Sherry Magee	.331	Philadelphia Phillies	Vin Campbell	.326	
1911	Honus Wagner^{†}	.334	Pittsburgh Pirates	Doc Miller	.333	
1912	Heinie Zimmerman	.372	Chicago Cubs	Chief Meyers	.358	
1913	Jake Daubert	.350	Brooklyn Superbas	Gavvy Cravath	.341	
1914	Jake Daubert	.329	Brooklyn Robins	Beals Becker	.325	
1915	Larry Doyle	.320	New York Giants	Fred Luderus	.315	
1916	Hal Chase	.339	Cincinnati Reds	Jake Daubert	.316	
1917	Edd Roush^{†}	.341	Cincinnati Reds	Rogers Hornsby^{†}	.327	
1918	Zack Wheat^{†}	.335	Brooklyn Robins	Edd Roush^{†}	.333	
1919	Edd Roush^{†}	.321	Cincinnati Reds	Rogers Hornsby^{†}	.318	
1920	Rogers Hornsby^{†}	.370	St. Louis Cardinals	Ross Youngs^{†}	.351	
1921	Rogers Hornsby^{†}	.397	St. Louis Cardinals	Edd Roush^{†}	.352	
1922	Rogers Hornsby^{†}	.401	St. Louis Cardinals	Ray Grimes	.354	
1923	Rogers Hornsby^{†}	.384	St. Louis Cardinals	Jim Bottomley^{†}	.371	
1924	Rogers Hornsby^{†}	.424	St. Louis Cardinals	Zack Wheat^{†}	.375	
1925	Rogers Hornsby^{†}	.403	St. Louis Cardinals	Jim Bottomley^{†}	.367	
1926	Bubbles Hargrave	.353	Cincinnati Reds	Cuckoo Christensen	.350	
1927	Paul Waner^{†}	.380	Pittsburgh Pirates	Rogers Hornsby^{†}	.361	
1928	Rogers Hornsby^{†}	.387	Boston Braves	Paul Waner^{†}	.370	
1929	Lefty O'Doul	.398	Philadelphia Phillies	Babe Herman	.381	
1930	Bill Terry^{†}	.401	New York Giants	Babe Herman	.393	
1931	Chick Hafey^{†}	.349	St. Louis Cardinals	Bill Terry^{†}	.349	
1932	Lefty O'Doul	.368	Brooklyn Dodgers	Bill Terry^{†}	.350	
1933	Chuck Klein^{†}	.368	Philadelphia Phillies	Spud Davis	.349	
1934	Paul Waner^{†}	.362	Pittsburgh Pirates	Bill Terry^{†}	.354	
1935	Arky Vaughan^{†}	.385	Pittsburgh Pirates	Joe Medwick^{†}	.353	
1936	Paul Waner^{†}	.373	Pittsburgh Pirates	Babe Phelps	.367	
1937	Joe Medwick^{†}	.374	St. Louis Cardinals	Johnny Mize^{†}	.364	
1938	Ernie Lombardi^{†}	.342	Cincinnati Reds	Johnny Mize^{†}	.337	
1939	Johnny Mize^{†}	.349	St. Louis Cardinals	Frank McCormick	.332	
1940	Debs Garms	.355	Pittsburgh Pirates	Ernie Lombardi^{†}	.319	
1941	Pete Reiser	.343	Brooklyn Dodgers	Johnny Cooney	.319	
1942	Ernie Lombardi^{†}	.330	Boston Braves	Enos Slaughter^{†}	.318	
1943	Stan Musial^{†}	.357	St. Louis Cardinals	Billy Herman^{†}	.330	
1944	Dixie Walker	.357	Brooklyn Dodgers	Stan Musial^{†}	.347	
1945	Phil Cavarretta	.355	Chicago Cubs	Tommy Holmes	.352	
1946	Stan Musial^{†}	.365	St. Louis Cardinals	Johnny Hopp	.333	
1947	Harry Walker	.363	St. Louis Cardinals; Philadelphia Phillies	Bob Elliott	.317	
1948	Stan Musial^{†}	.376	St. Louis Cardinals	Richie Ashburn^{†}	.333	
1949	Jackie Robinson^{†}	.342	Brooklyn Dodgers	Stan Musial^{†}	.338	
1950	Stan Musial^{†}	.346	St. Louis Cardinals	Jackie Robinson^{†}	.328	
1951	Stan Musial^{†}	.355	St. Louis Cardinals	Richie Ashburn^{†}	.344	
1952	Stan Musial^{†}	.336	St. Louis Cardinals	Frank Baumholtz	.325	
1953	Carl Furillo	.344	Brooklyn Dodgers	Red Schoendienst^{†}	.342	
1954	Willie Mays^{†}	.345	New York Giants	Don Mueller	.342	
1955	Richie Ashburn^{†}	.338	Philadelphia Phillies	Willie Mays^{†}	.319	
1956	Hank Aaron^{†}	.328	Milwaukee Braves	Bill Virdon	.319	
1957	Stan Musial^{†}	.351	St. Louis Cardinals	Willie Mays^{†}	.333	
1958	Richie Ashburn^{†}	.350	Philadelphia Phillies	Willie Mays^{†}	.347	
1959	Hank Aaron^{†}	.355	Milwaukee Braves	Joe Cunningham	.345	
1960	Dick Groat	.325	Pittsburgh Pirates	Norm Larker	.323	
1961	Roberto Clemente^{†}	.351	Pittsburgh Pirates	Vada Pinson	.343	
1962	Tommy Davis	.346	Los Angeles Dodgers	Frank Robinson^{†}	.342	
1963	Tommy Davis	.326	Los Angeles Dodgers	Roberto Clemente^{†}	.320	
1964	Roberto Clemente^{†}	.339	Pittsburgh Pirates	Rico Carty	.330	
1965	Roberto Clemente^{†}	.329	Pittsburgh Pirates	Hank Aaron^{†}	.318	
1966	Matty Alou	.342	Pittsburgh Pirates	Felipe Alou	.327	
1967	Roberto Clemente^{†}	.357	Pittsburgh Pirates	Tony González	.339	
1968	Pete Rose	.335	Cincinnati Reds	Matty Alou	.332	
1969	Pete Rose	.348	Cincinnati Reds	Roberto Clemente^{†}	.345	
1970	Rico Carty	.366	Atlanta Braves	Joe Torre^{†}	.325	
1971	Joe Torre^{†}	.363	St. Louis Cardinals	Ralph Garr	.343	
1972	Billy Williams^{†}	.333	Chicago Cubs	Ralph Garr	.325	
1973	Pete Rose	.338	Cincinnati Reds	César Cedeño	.320	
1974	Ralph Garr	.353	Atlanta Braves	Al Oliver	.321	
1975	Bill Madlock	.354	Chicago Cubs	Ted Simmons^{†}	.332	
1976	Bill Madlock	.339	Chicago Cubs	Ken Griffey Sr.	.336	
1977	Dave Parker^{†}	.338	Pittsburgh Pirates	Rennie Stennett	.336	
1978	Dave Parker^{†}	.334	Pittsburgh Pirates	Steve Garvey	.316	
1979	Keith Hernandez	.344	St. Louis Cardinals	Pete Rose	.331	
1980	Bill Buckner	.324	Chicago Cubs	Keith Hernandez	.321	
1981	Bill Madlock	.341	Pittsburgh Pirates	Pete Rose	.325	
1982	Al Oliver	.331	Montreal Expos	Bill Madlock	.319	
1983	Bill Madlock	.323	Pittsburgh Pirates	Lonnie Smith	.321	
1984	Tony Gwynn^{†}	.351	San Diego Padres	Lee Lacy	.321	
1985	Willie McGee	.353	St. Louis Cardinals	Pedro Guerrero	.320	
1986	Tim Raines^{†}	.334	Montreal Expos	Steve Sax	.332	
1987	Tony Gwynn^{†}	.370	San Diego Padres	Pedro Guerrero	.338	
1988	Tony Gwynn^{†}	.313	San Diego Padres	Rafael Palmeiro	.307	
1989	Tony Gwynn^{†}	.336	San Diego Padres	Will Clark	.333	
1990	Willie McGee	.335	St. Louis Cardinals	Eddie Murray^{†}	.330	
1991	Terry Pendleton	.319	Atlanta Braves	Hal Morris	.318	
1992	Gary Sheffield	.330	San Diego Padres	Andy Van Slyke	.324	
1993	Andrés Galarraga	.370	Colorado Rockies	Tony Gwynn^{†}	.358	
1994	Tony Gwynn^{†}	.394	San Diego Padres	Jeff Bagwell^{†}	.368	
1995	Tony Gwynn^{†}	.368	San Diego Padres	Mike Piazza^{†}	.346	
1996	Tony Gwynn^{†}	.353	San Diego Padres	Ellis Burks	.344	
1997	Tony Gwynn^{†}	.372	San Diego Padres	Larry Walker^{†}	.366	
1998	Larry Walker^{†}	.363	Colorado Rockies	John Olerud	.354	
1999	Larry Walker^{†}	.379	Colorado Rockies	Luis Gonzalez	.336	
2000	Todd Helton^{†}	.372	Colorado Rockies	Moisés Alou	.355	
2001	Larry Walker^{†}	.350	Colorado Rockies	Todd Helton^{†}	.336	
2002	Barry Bonds	.370	San Francisco Giants	Larry Walker^{†}	.338	
2003	Albert Pujols	.359	St. Louis Cardinals	Todd Helton^{†}	.358	
2004	Barry Bonds	.362	San Francisco Giants	Todd Helton^{†}	.347	
2005	Derrek Lee	.335	Chicago Cubs	Albert Pujols	.330	
2006	Freddy Sanchez	.344	Pittsburgh Pirates	Miguel Cabrera	.339	
2007	Matt Holliday	.340	Colorado Rockies	Chipper Jones^{†}	.337	
2008	Chipper Jones^{†}	.364	Atlanta Braves	Albert Pujols	.357	
2009	Hanley Ramírez	.342	Florida Marlins	Pablo Sandoval	.330	
2010	Carlos González	.336	Colorado Rockies	Joey Votto	.324	
2011	José Reyes	.337	New York Mets	Ryan Braun	.332	
2012	Buster Posey	.336	San Francisco Giants	Andrew McCutchen	.327	
2013	Michael Cuddyer	.331	Colorado Rockies	Chris Johnson	.321	
2014	Justin Morneau	.319	Colorado Rockies	Josh Harrison	.315	
2015	Dee Gordon	.333	Miami Marlins	Bryce Harper	.330	
2016	DJ LeMahieu	.348	Colorado Rockies	Daniel Murphy	.347	
2017	Charlie Blackmon	.331	Colorado Rockies	Daniel Murphy	.322	
2018	Christian Yelich	.326	Milwaukee Brewers	Scooter Gennett	.310	
2019	Christian Yelich	.329^{[a]}	Milwaukee Brewers	Ketel Marte	.329	
2020^{[b]}	Juan Soto	.351	Washington Nationals	Freddie Freeman	.341	
2021	Trea Turner	.328	Washington Nationals; Los Angeles Dodgers	Juan Soto	.313	
2022	Jeff McNeil	.326	New York Mets	Freddie Freeman	.325	
2023	Luis Arráez	.354	Miami Marlins	Ronald Acuña Jr.	.337	
2024	Luis Arráez	.314	Miami Marlins; San Diego Padres	Shohei Ohtani	.310	
2025	Trea Turner	.304	Philadelphia Phillies	Nico Hoerner	.297	
2026	Gabriel Moreno	.311	Arizona Diamondbacks	Luis Arráez	.310	

=== American League ===
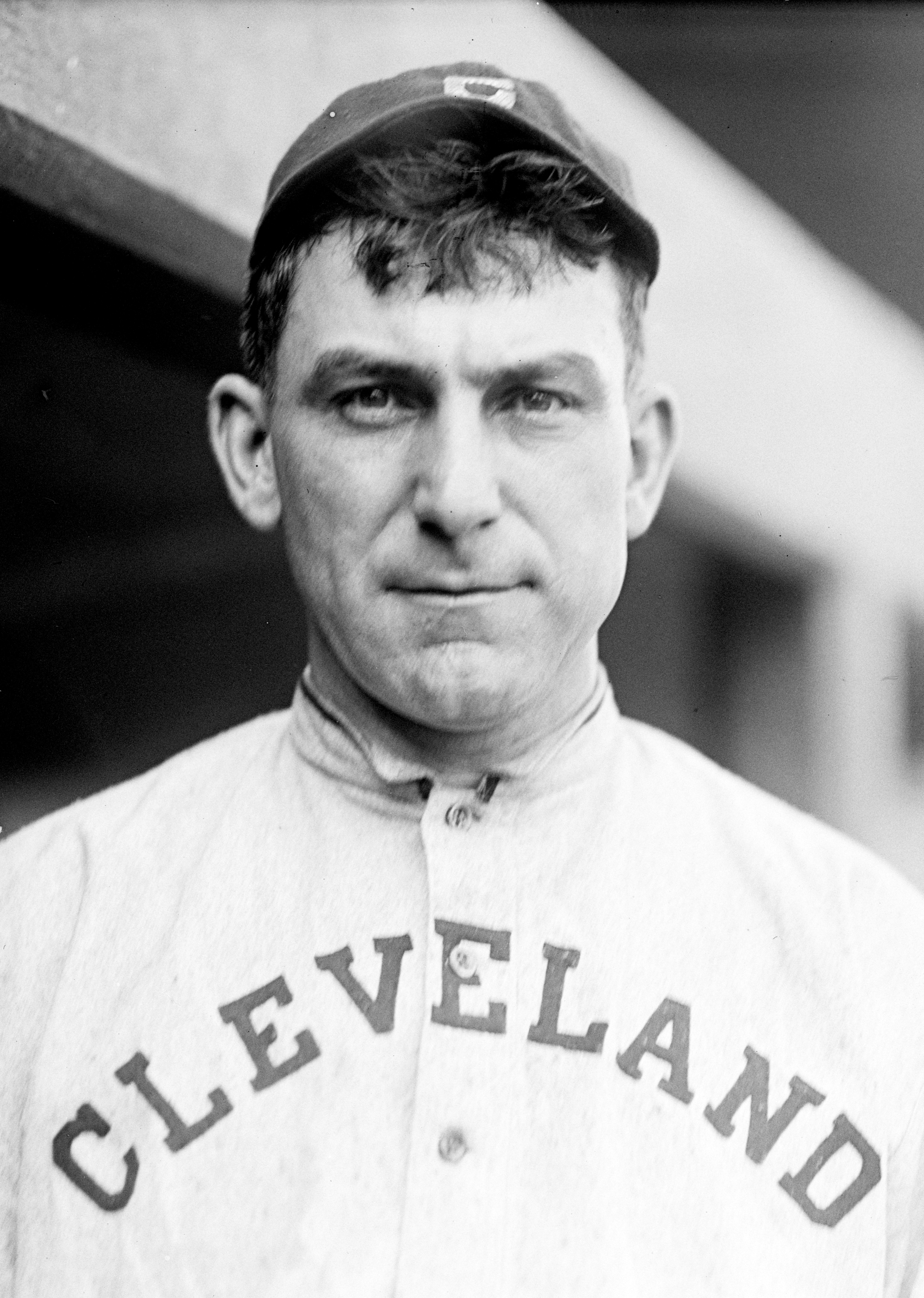
Nap Lajoie led the American League in its inaugural season with a .426 batting average, one of just 13 seasons of a .400+ average in the 20th century. He also won the 1903 and 1904 AL batting titles. In addition, Lajoie was a part of contested batting average races in 1902 and 1910.

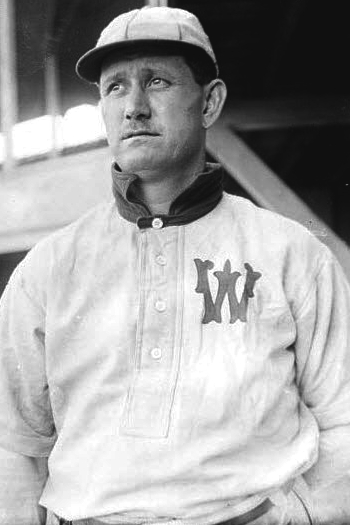
Ed Delahanty won the 1899 NL batting title and the 1902 AL batting title, though his 1902 title is disputed.

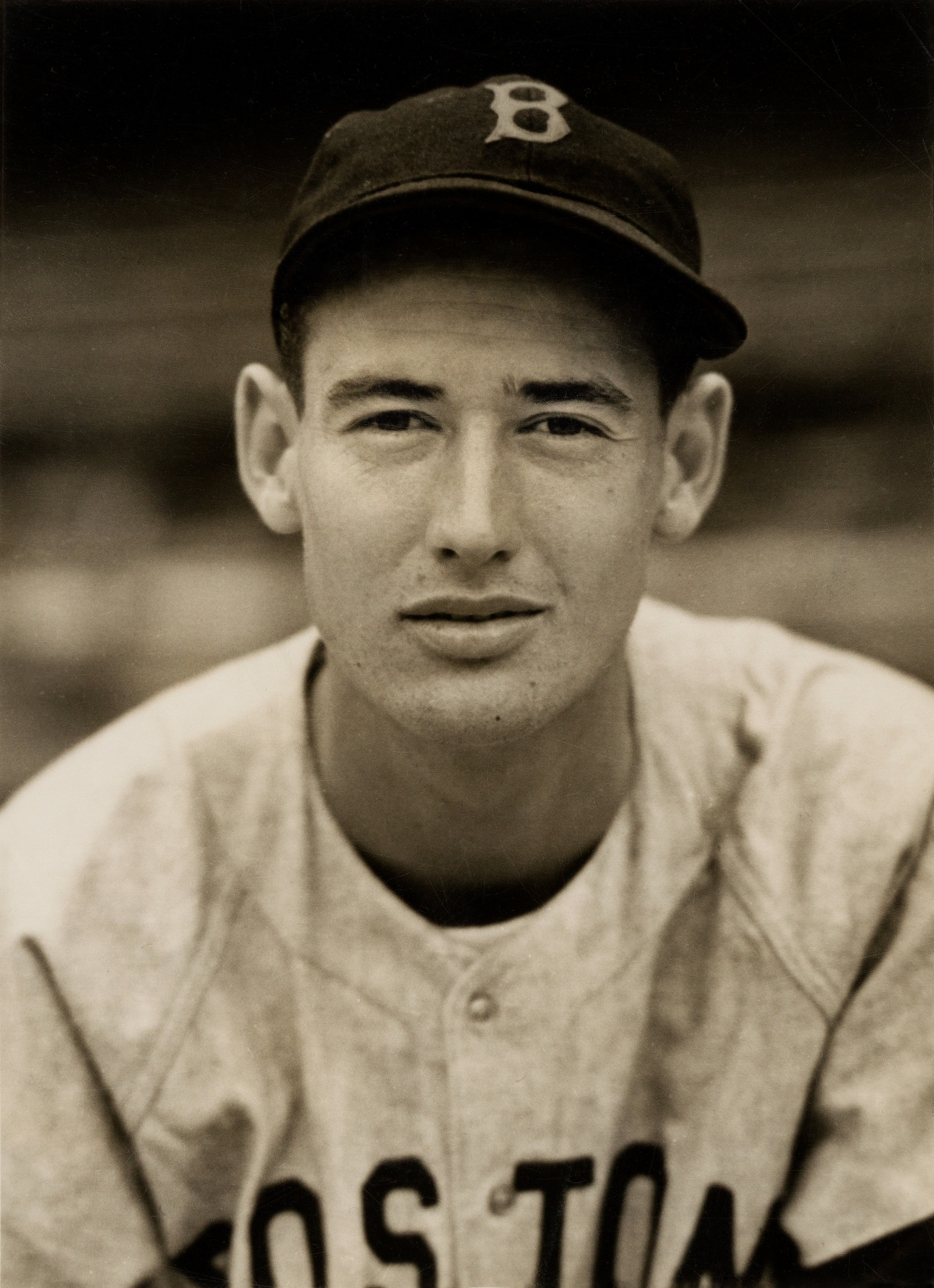
Ted Williams won six AL batting titles. He hit .406 in 1941, and that is the last time a player has hit over .400.

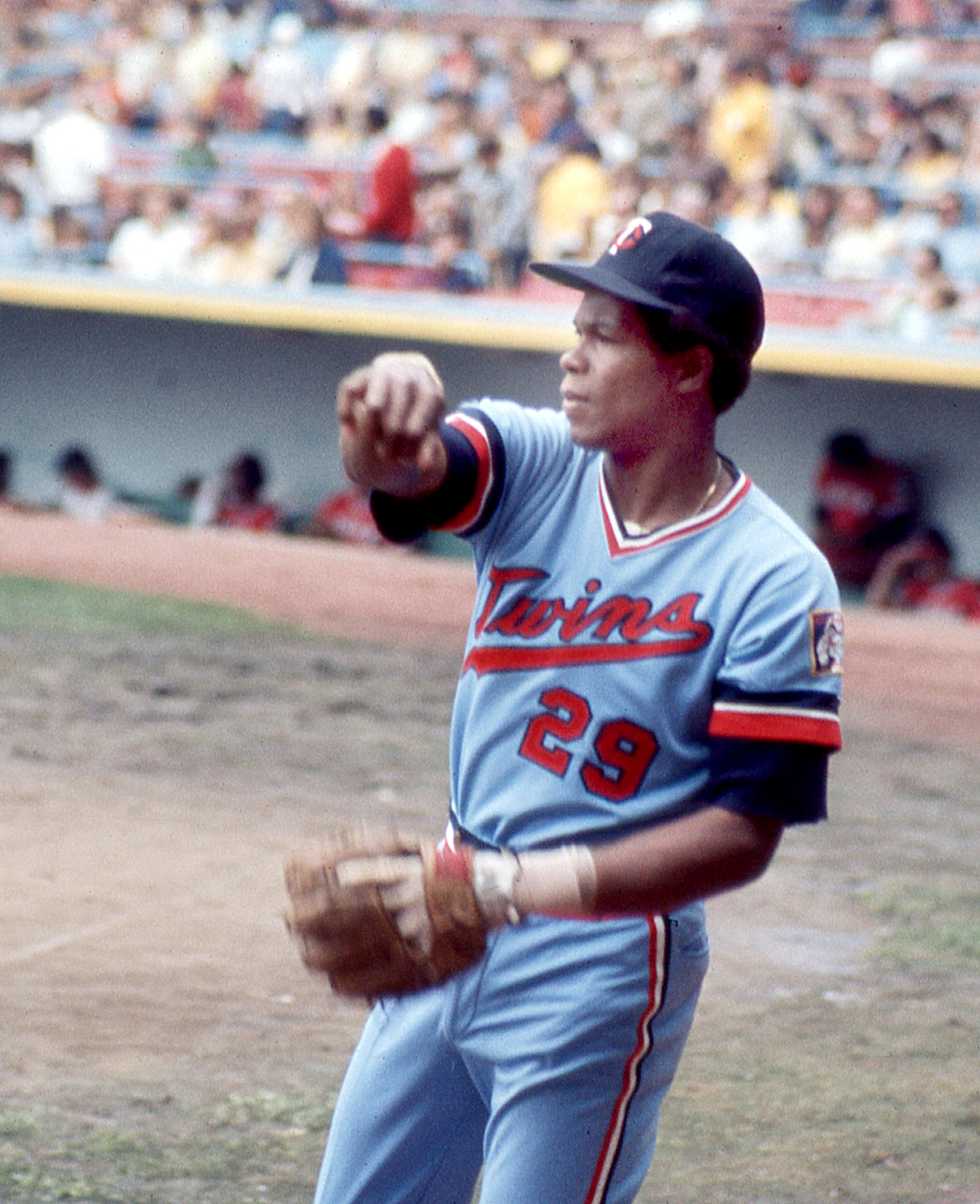
Rod Carew won seven AL batting titles between 1969 and 1978.

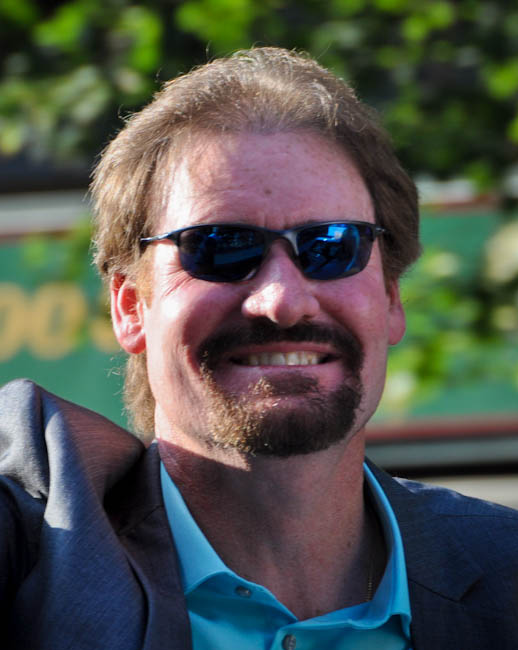
Wade Boggs won five batting titles in six years. He owns the highest career batting average by an AL player who debuted after World War II.

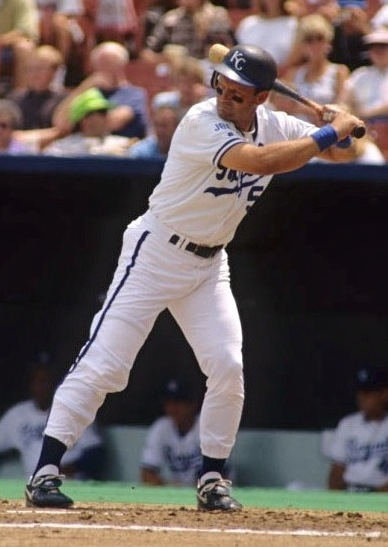
George Brett's .390 batting average in 1980 is the second-highest since 1941.

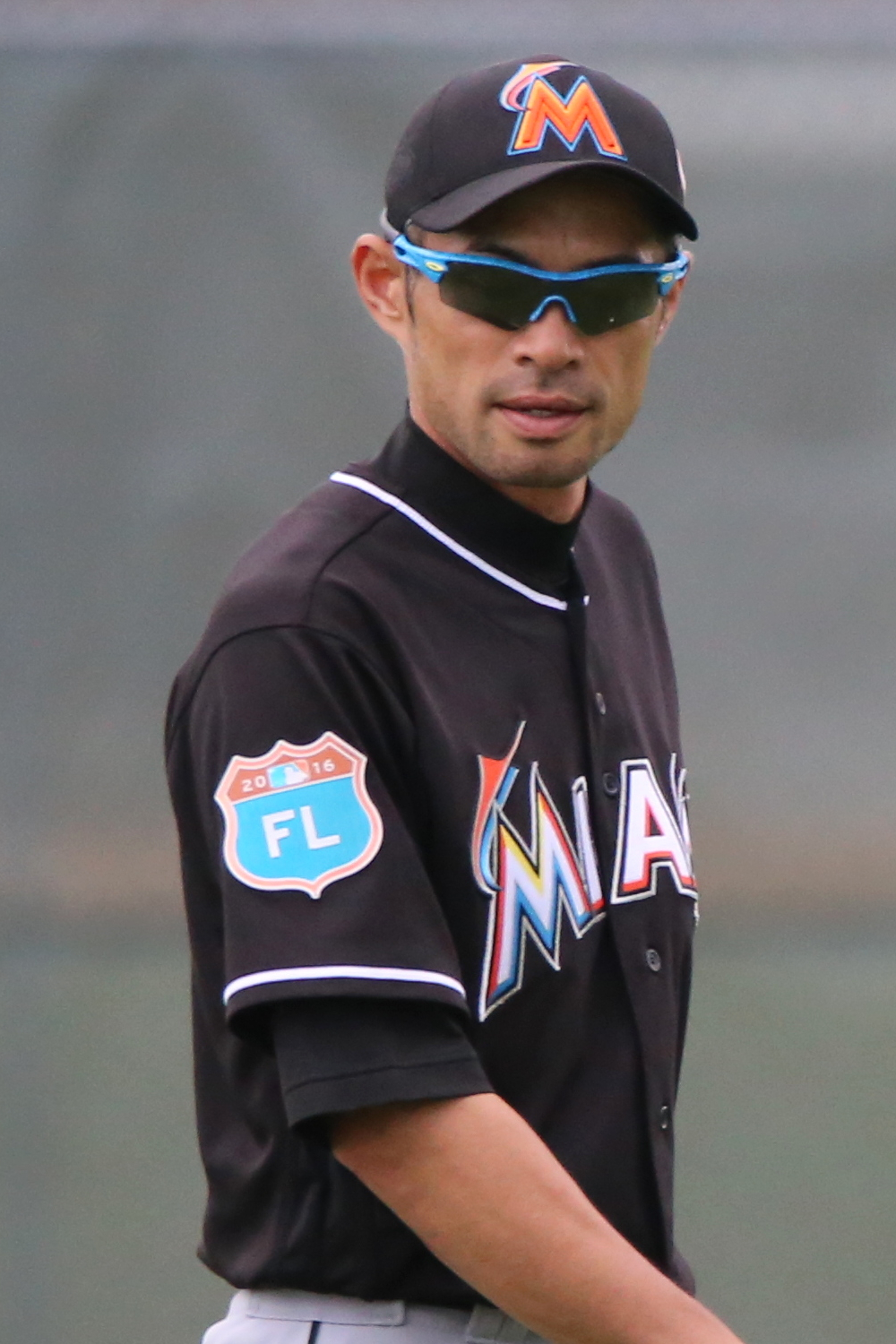
Ichiro Suzuki won AL batting titles in 2001 and 2004.

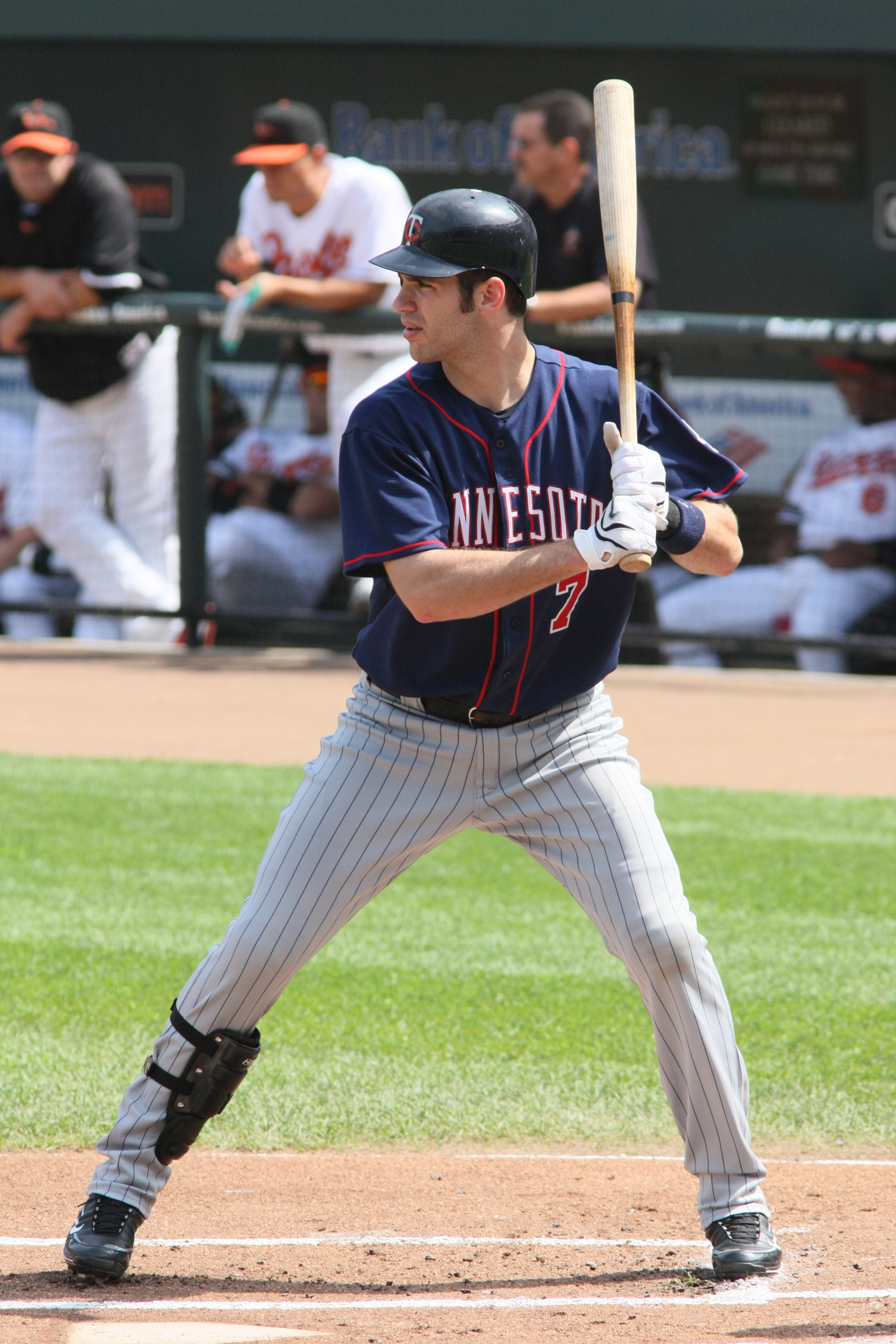
Joe Mauer won the 2006, 2008, and 2009 batting titles, becoming the first catcher to win three batting titles and the only catcher ever to win in the AL.

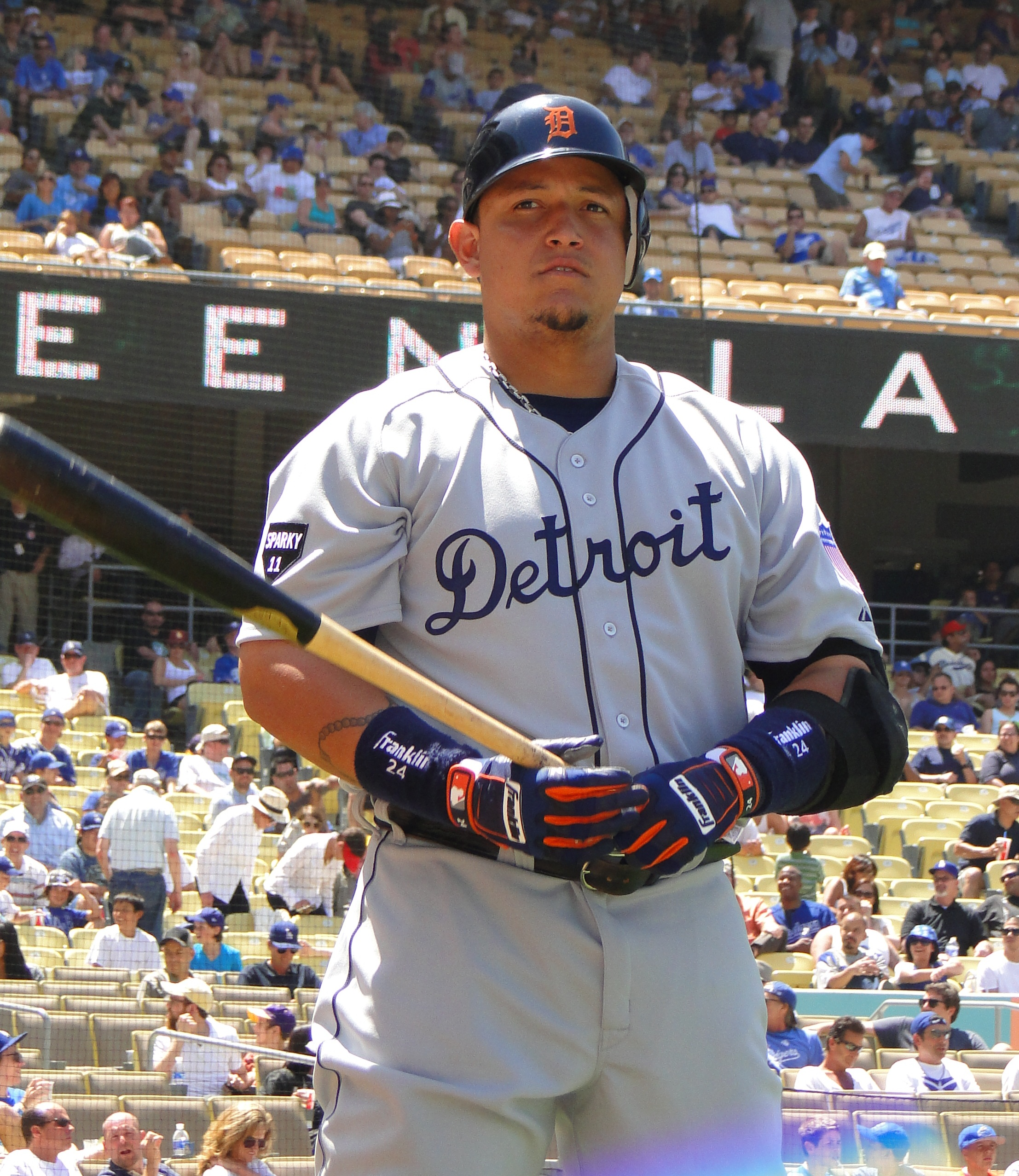
Miguel Cabrera won four batting titles in five years. He remains the most recent player to win the Triple Crown, doing so in 2012.

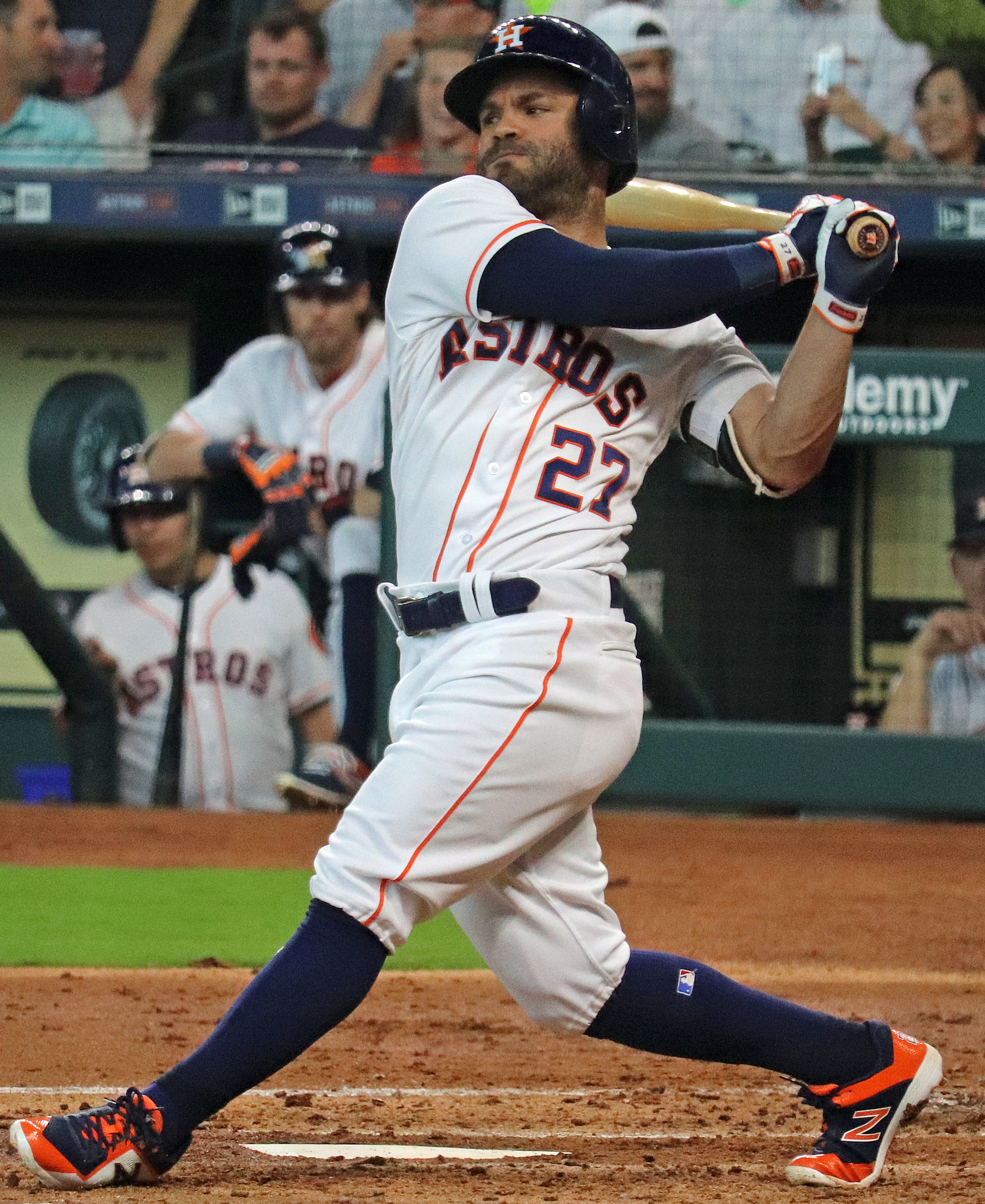
Jose Altuve won three batting titles in 2014, 2016, and 2017. Standing 5 feet 6 inches (1.68m), he is the shortest AL batting champion.

Year	Winner	AVG	Team(s)	Runner-up	2nd AVG	Ref
1901	Nap Lajoie^{†}	.426	Philadelphia Athletics	Mike Donlin	.340	
1902	Ed Delahanty^{†}	.376	Washington Senators	Charlie Hickman^{†}	.361	
1903	Nap Lajoie^{†}	.344	Cleveland Naps	Sam Crawford^{†}	.335	
1904	Nap Lajoie^{†}	.376	Cleveland Naps	Willie Keeler^{†}	.343	
1905	Elmer Flick^{†}	.308	Cleveland Naps	Willie Keeler^{†}	.302	
1906	George Stone	.358	St. Louis Browns	Nap Lajoie^{†}	.355	
1907	Ty Cobb^{†}	.350	Detroit Tigers	Sam Crawford^{†}	.323	
1908	Ty Cobb^{†}	.324	Detroit Tigers	Sam Crawford^{†}	.311	
1909	Ty Cobb^{†}	.377	Detroit Tigers	Eddie Collins^{†}	.347	
1910	Ty Cobb^{†}	.385	Detroit Tigers	Nap Lajoie^{†}	.384	
1911	Ty Cobb^{†}	.420	Detroit Tigers	Shoeless Joe Jackson	.408	
1912	Ty Cobb^{†}	.409	Detroit Tigers	Shoeless Joe Jackson	.395	
1913	Ty Cobb^{†}	.390	Detroit Tigers	Shoeless Joe Jackson	.373	
1914	Ty Cobb^{†}	.368	Detroit Tigers	Eddie Collins^{†}	.344	
1915	Ty Cobb^{†}	.369	Detroit Tigers	Eddie Collins^{†}	.332	
1916	Tris Speaker^{†}	.386	Cleveland Indians	Ty Cobb^{†}	.371	
1917	Ty Cobb^{†}	.383	Detroit Tigers	George Sisler^{†}	.353	
1918	Ty Cobb^{†}	.382	Detroit Tigers	George Burns	.352	
1919	Ty Cobb^{†}	.384	Detroit Tigers	Bobby Veach	.355	
1920	George Sisler^{†}	.407	St. Louis Browns	Tris Speaker^{†}	.388	
1921	Harry Heilmann^{†}	.394	Detroit Tigers	Ty Cobb^{†}	.389	
1922	George Sisler^{†}	.420	St. Louis Browns	Ty Cobb^{†}	.401	
1923	Harry Heilmann^{†}	.403	Detroit Tigers	Babe Ruth^{†}	.393	
1924	Babe Ruth^{†}	.378	New York Yankees	Charlie Jamieson	.359	
1925	Harry Heilmann^{†}	.393	Detroit Tigers	Tris Speaker^{†}	.389	
1926	Heinie Manush^{†}	.378	Detroit Tigers	Babe Ruth^{†}	.372	
1927	Harry Heilmann^{†}	.398	Detroit Tigers	Al Simmons^{†}	.392	
1928	Goose Goslin^{†}	.379	Washington Senators	Heinie Manush^{†}	.378	
1929	Lew Fonseca	.369	Cleveland Indians	Al Simmons^{†}	.365	
1930	Al Simmons^{†}	.381	Philadelphia Athletics	Lou Gehrig^{†}	.379	
1931	Al Simmons^{†}	.390	Philadelphia Athletics	Babe Ruth^{†}	.373	
1932	Dale Alexander	.367	Detroit Tigers; Boston Red Sox	Jimmie Foxx^{†}	.364	
1933	Jimmie Foxx^{†}	.356	Philadelphia Athletics	Heinie Manush^{†}	.336	
1934	Lou Gehrig^{†}	.363	New York Yankees	Charlie Gehringer^{†}	.356	
1935	Buddy Myer	.349	Washington Senators	Joe Vosmik	.348	
1936	Luke Appling^{†}	.388	Chicago White Sox	Earl Averill^{†}	.378	
1937	Charlie Gehringer^{†}	.371	Detroit Tigers	Lou Gehrig^{†}	.351	
1938	Jimmie Foxx^{†}	.349	Boston Red Sox	Jeff Heath	.343	
1939	Joe DiMaggio^{†}	.381	New York Yankees	Jimmie Foxx^{†}	.360	
1940	Joe DiMaggio^{†}	.352	New York Yankees	Luke Appling^{†}	.348	
1941	Ted Williams^{†}	.406	Boston Red Sox	Cecil Travis	.359	
1942	Ted Williams^{†}	.356	Boston Red Sox	Johnny Pesky	.331	
1943	Luke Appling^{†}	.328	Chicago White Sox	Dick Wakefield	.316	
1944	Lou Boudreau^{†}	.327	Cleveland Indians	Bobby Doerr^{†}	.325	
1945	Snuffy Stirnweiss	.309	New York Yankees	Tony Cuccinello	.308	
1946	Mickey Vernon	.353	Washington Senators	Ted Williams^{†}	.342	
1947	Ted Williams^{†}	.343	Boston Red Sox	Barney McCosky	.328	
1948	Ted Williams^{†}	.369	Boston Red Sox	Lou Boudreau^{†}	.355	
1949	George Kell^{†}	.343	Detroit Tigers	Ted Williams^{†}	.343	
1950	Billy Goodman	.354	Boston Red Sox	George Kell^{†}	.340	
1951	Ferris Fain	.344	Philadelphia Athletics	Minnie Miñoso^{†}	.326	
1952	Ferris Fain	.327	Philadelphia Athletics	Dale Mitchell	.323	
1953	Mickey Vernon	.337	Washington Senators	Al Rosen	.336	
1954	Bobby Ávila	.341	Cleveland Indians	Ted Williams^{†}	.345^{[1954]}	
1955	Al Kaline^{†}	.340	Detroit Tigers	Vic Power	.319	
1956	Mickey Mantle^{†}	.353	New York Yankees	Ted Williams^{†}	.345	
1957	Ted Williams^{†}	.388	Boston Red Sox	Mickey Mantle^{†}	.365	
1958	Ted Williams^{†}	.328	Boston Red Sox	Pete Runnels	.322	
1959	Harvey Kuenn	.353	Detroit Tigers	Al Kaline^{†}	.327	
1960	Pete Runnels	.320	Boston Red Sox	Al Smith	.315	
1961	Norm Cash	.361	Detroit Tigers	Al Kaline^{†}	.324	
1962	Pete Runnels	.326	Boston Red Sox	Mickey Mantle^{†}	.321	
1963	Carl Yastrzemski^{†}	.321	Boston Red Sox	Al Kaline^{†}	.312	
1964	Tony Oliva^{†}	.323	Minnesota Twins	Brooks Robinson^{†}	.317	
1965	Tony Oliva^{†}	.321	Minnesota Twins	Carl Yastrzemski^{†}	.312	
1966	Frank Robinson^{†}	.316	Baltimore Orioles	Tony Oliva^{†}	.307	
1967	Carl Yastrzemski^{†}	.326	Boston Red Sox	Frank Robinson^{†}	.311	
1968	Carl Yastrzemski^{†}	.301	Boston Red Sox	Danny Cater	.290	
1969	Rod Carew^{†}	.332	Minnesota Twins	Reggie Smith	.309	
1970	Alex Johnson	.329	California Angels	Carl Yastrzemski^{†}	.329	
1971	Tony Oliva^{†}	.337	Minnesota Twins	Bobby Murcer	.331	
1972	Rod Carew^{†}	.318	Minnesota Twins	Lou Piniella	.312	
1973	Rod Carew^{†}	.350	Minnesota Twins	George Scott	.306	
1974	Rod Carew^{†}	.364	Minnesota Twins	Jorge Orta	.316	
1975	Rod Carew^{†}	.359	Minnesota Twins	Fred Lynn	.331	
1976	George Brett^{†}	.333	Kansas City Royals	Hal McRae	.332	
1977	Rod Carew^{†}	.388	Minnesota Twins	Lyman Bostock	.336	
1978	Rod Carew^{†}	.333	Minnesota Twins	Al Oliver	.324	
1979	Fred Lynn	.333	Boston Red Sox	George Brett^{†}	.329	
1980	George Brett^{†}	.390	Kansas City Royals	Cecil Cooper	.352	
1981	Carney Lansford	.336	Boston Red Sox	Tom Paciorek	.326	
1982	Willie Wilson	.332	Kansas City Royals	Robin Yount^{†}	.331	
1983	Wade Boggs^{†}	.361	Boston Red Sox	Rod Carew^{†}	.339	
1984	Don Mattingly	.343	New York Yankees	Dave Winfield^{†}	.340	
1985	Wade Boggs^{†}	.368	Boston Red Sox	George Brett^{†}	.335	
1986	Wade Boggs^{†}	.357	Boston Red Sox	Don Mattingly	.352	
1987	Wade Boggs^{†}	.363	Boston Red Sox	Paul Molitor^{†}	.353	
1988	Wade Boggs^{†}	.366	Boston Red Sox	Kirby Puckett^{†}	.356	
1989	Kirby Puckett^{†}	.339	Minnesota Twins	Carney Lansford	.336	
1990	George Brett^{†}	.329	Kansas City Royals	Rickey Henderson^{†}	.325	
1991	Julio Franco	.341	Texas Rangers	Wade Boggs^{†}	.332	
1992	Edgar Martínez^{†}	.343	Seattle Mariners	Kirby Puckett^{†}	.329	
1993	John Olerud	.363	Toronto Blue Jays	Paul Molitor^{†}	.332	
1994	Paul O'Neill	.359	New York Yankees	Albert Belle	.357	
1995	Edgar Martínez^{†}	.356	Seattle Mariners	Chuck Knoblauch	.333	
1996	Alex Rodriguez	.358	Seattle Mariners	Frank Thomas^{†}	.349	
1997	Frank Thomas^{†}	.347	Chicago White Sox	Edgar Martínez^{†}	.330	
1998	Bernie Williams	.339	New York Yankees	Mo Vaughn	.337	
1999	Nomar Garciaparra	.357	Boston Red Sox	Derek Jeter^{†}	.349	
2000	Nomar Garciaparra	.372	Boston Red Sox	Darin Erstad	.355	
2001	Ichiro Suzuki^{†}	.350	Seattle Mariners	Jason Giambi	.342	
2002	Manny Ramirez	.349	Boston Red Sox	Mike Sweeney	.340	
2003	Bill Mueller	.326	Boston Red Sox	Manny Ramirez	.325	
2004	Ichiro Suzuki^{†}	.372	Seattle Mariners	Melvin Mora	.340	
2005	Michael Young	.331	Texas Rangers	Alex Rodriguez	.321	
2006	Joe Mauer^{†}	.347	Minnesota Twins	Derek Jeter^{†}	.344	
2007	Magglio Ordóñez	.363	Detroit Tigers	Ichiro Suzuki^{†}	.351	
2008	Joe Mauer^{†}	.328	Minnesota Twins	Dustin Pedroia	.326	
2009	Joe Mauer^{†}	.365	Minnesota Twins	Ichiro Suzuki^{†}	.352	
2010	Josh Hamilton	.359	Texas Rangers	Miguel Cabrera	.328	
2011	Miguel Cabrera	.344	Detroit Tigers	Adrián González	.338	
2012	Miguel Cabrera	.330	Detroit Tigers	Mike Trout	.326	
2013	Miguel Cabrera	.348	Detroit Tigers	Joe Mauer^{†}	.324	
2014	Jose Altuve	.341	Houston Astros	Victor Martinez	.335	
2015	Miguel Cabrera	.338	Detroit Tigers	Xander Bogaerts	.320	
2016	Jose Altuve	.338	Houston Astros	Mookie Betts	.318	
2017	Jose Altuve	.346	Houston Astros	Avisaíl García	.330	
2018	Mookie Betts	.346	Boston Red Sox	J. D. Martinez	.330	
2019	Tim Anderson	.335	Chicago White Sox	DJ LeMahieu	.327	
2020^{[b]}	DJ LeMahieu	.364	New York Yankees	Tim Anderson	.322	
2021	Yuli Gurriel	.319	Houston Astros	Michael Brantley	.311	
2022	Luis Arráez	.316	Minnesota Twins	Aaron Judge	.311	
2023	Yandy Díaz	.330	Tampa Bay Rays	Corey Seager	.327	
2024	Bobby Witt Jr.	.332	Kansas City Royals	Vladimir Guerrero Jr.	.323	
2025	Aaron Judge	.331	New York Yankees	Bo Bichette	.311	
2026	Yordan Álvarez	.316	Houston Astros	Chandler Simpson	.306	

=== Other recognized leagues ===
==== American Association ====
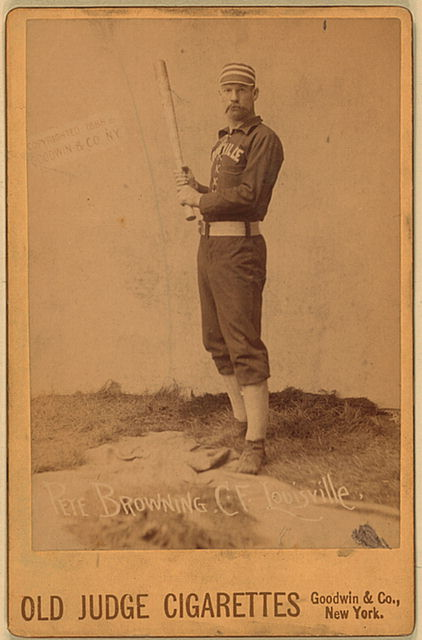
Pete Browning was the American Association batting champion twice and runner-up three times.

Year	Winner	AVG	Team	Runner-up	2nd AVG	Ref
1882	Pete Browning	.378	Louisville Eclipse	Hick Carpenter	.342	
1883	Ed Swartwood	.357	Pittsburgh Alleghenys	Pete Browning	.338	
1884	Dave Orr	.354	New York Metropolitans	John Reilly	.339	
1885	Pete Browning	.362	Louisville Colonels	Dave Orr	.342	
1886	Guy Hecker	.341	Louisville Colonels	Pete Browning	.340	
1887	Tip O'Neill	.435	St. Louis Browns	Pete Browning	.402	
1888	Tip O'Neill	.335	St. Louis Browns	John Reilly	.321	
1889	Tommy Tucker	.372	Baltimore Orioles	Tip O'Neill	.335	
1890	Chicken Wolf	.363	Louisville Colonels	Denny Lyons	.354	
1891	Dan Brouthers^{†}	.350	Boston Reds	Hugh Duffy^{†}	.336	

==== Union Association ====
Year	Winner	AVG	Team	Runner-up	2nd AVG	Ref
1884	Fred Dunlap	.412	St. Louis Maroons	Orator Shafer	.360	

==== Players' League ====
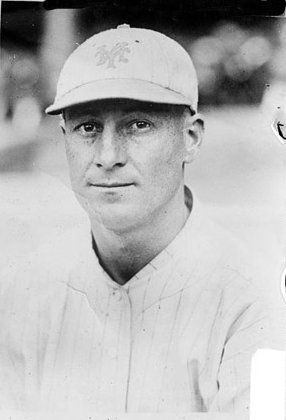
Benny Kauff won the only two Federal League batting titles.

Year	Winner	AVG	Team	Runner-up	2nd AVG	Ref
1890	Pete Browning	.373	Cleveland Infants	Dave Orr	.371	

==== Federal League ====
Year	Winner	AVG	Team	Runner-up	2nd AVG	Ref
1914	Benny Kauff	.370	Indianapolis Hoosiers	Steve Evans	.348	
1915	Benny Kauff	.342	Brooklyn Tip-Tops	William Fischer	.329	

==== Negro leagues ====
In the 28-year major-league history, nine players won a league batting title multiple times: Oscar Charleston (3), Josh Gibson (3), Monte Irvin (3), Heavy Johnson (2), Buck Leonard (2), Jud Wilson (2), Mule Suttles (2), Ted Strong (2) and Turkey Stearnes (2).

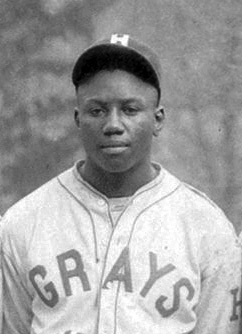
Josh Gibson won three batting titles and is tied with Oscar Charleston and Monte Irvin for the most among the Negro Leagues in history. Gibson and Willard Brown are the only players to have finished in the top two in batting average in five different seasons.

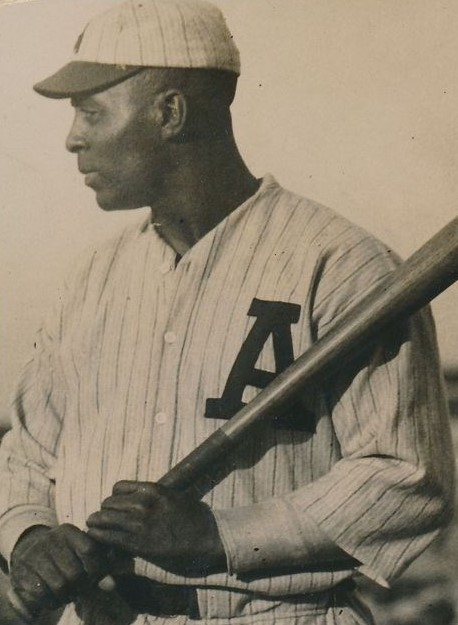
Oscar Charleston won batting championships in the Negro National League and Eastern Colored League, and holds the third all-time highest career batting average of .363 during a span of 21 years (1920–1941).

Year	Winner	AVG	Team	League	Runner-up	2nd AVG	Ref
1920	Cristóbal Torriente†	.411	Chicago American Giants	Negro National League	Jimmie Lyons	.379	
1921	Oscar Charleston†	.433	St. Louis Giants	Negro National League	Charlie Blackwell	.405	
1922	Heavy Johnson	.406	Kansas City Monarchs	Negro National League	Dobie Moore	.386	
1923	Heavy Johnson	.406	Kansas City Monarchs	Negro National League	Cristobal Torriente†	.387	
1923	Biz Mackey†	.423	Hilldale Club	Eastern Colored League	Robert Hudspeth	.367	
1924	Valentín Dreke	.389	Cuban Stars (West)	Negro National League	Newt Joseph	.375	
1924	Oscar Charleston†	.405	Harrisburg Giants	Eastern Colored League	Jud Wilson†	.385	
1925	Edgar Wesley	.404	Detroit Stars	Negro National League	Wilson Redus	.372	
1925	Oscar Charleston†	.427	Harrisburg Giants	Eastern Colored League	John Beckwith	.404	
1926	Mule Suttles†	.425	St. Louis Stars	Negro National League	Turkey Stearnes†	.383	
1926	Martin Dihigo†	.375	Cuban Stars (East)	Eastern Colored League	Jud Wilson†	.373	
1927	Red Parnell	.422	Birmingham Black Barons	Negro National League	Steel Arm Davis	.396	
1927	Jud Wilson†	.422	Baltimore Black Sox; New York Lincoln Giants	Eastern Colored League	Oscar Charleston†	.399	
1928	Mule Suttles†	.359^{s}	St. Louis Stars	Negro National League	Willie Wells†	.359	
1928	Jud Wilson†	.399	Baltimore Black Sox	Eastern Colored League	Rap Dixon	.398	
1929	Charlie Smith	.451	New York Lincoln Giants	American Negro League	Rap Dixon	.415	
1929	Turkey Stearnes†	.390	Detroit Stars	Negro National League	Pythias Russ	.369	
1930	Willie Wells†	.411	St. Louis Stars	Negro National League	Mule Suttles†	.409	
1931	Turkey Stearnes†	.376	Detroit Stars	Negro National League	Jim Williams	.354	
1932	Dick Lundy	.381	Baltimore Black Sox	East-West League	Eppie Hamilton	.368	
1932	Leroy Morney	.378	Monroe Monarchs	Negro Southern League	Ernest Scott	.362	
1933^{a}	Jabbo Andrews	.398	Columbus Blue Birds	Negro National League II	Josh Gibson†	.395	
1934	Buddy Burbage	.438	Newark Dodgers	Negro National League II	Ray Dandridge†	.432	
1935	Buck Leonard†	.389	Homestead Grays	Negro National League II	Turkey Stearnes†	.388	
1936	Josh Gibson†	.389	Pittsburgh Crawfords	Negro National League II	Roy Parnell	.367	
1937	Josh Gibson†	.417	Homestead Grays	Negro National League II	Jim West	.394	
1937	Bill Carter	.390	St. Louis Stars; Birmingham Black Barons	Negro American League	Willard Brown†	.379	
1938	Buck Leonard†	.420	Homestead Grays	Negro National League II	Harry Williams	.393	
1938	David Whatley ^{b}	.396	Birmingham Black Barons; Memphis Red Sox	Negro American League	Donald Reeves	.384	
1939	Josh Gibson†	.402	Homestead Grays	Negro National League II	Buck Leonard†	.385	
1939	Henry Turner	.393	Cleveland Bears	Negro American League	Willard Brown†	.368	
1940	Monte Irvin†* ^{c}	.380	Newark Eagles	Negro National League II	Buck Leonard	.378	
1940	Ed Mayweather ^{d}	.376	St. Louis-New Orleans Stars	Negro American League	Jesse Williams	.366	
1941	Monte Irvin†	.387	Newark Eagles	Negro National League II	Tetelo Vargas	.349	
1941	Lyman Bostock ^{e}	.466	Birmingham Black Barons	Negro American League	Cowan Hyde	.387	
1942	Lennie Pearson	.347	Newark Eagles; Homestead Grays	Negro National League II	Willie Wells†	.343	
1942	Ted Strong	.364	Kansas City Monarchs	Negro American League	Barney Serrell	.360	
1943	Tetelo Vargas	.471	New York Cubans	Negro National League II	Josh Gibson†	.466	
1943	Alex Radcliffe	.369	Chicago American Giants	Negro American League	Willard Brown†	.340	
1944	Roy Campanella† ^{f}	.388	Baltimore Elite Giants; Philadelphia Stars	Negro National League II	Bill Hoskins	.388	
1944	Jesse Douglas ^{g}	.400	Chicago American Giants	Negro American League	Artie Wilson	.379	
1945	Frankie Austin ^{h}	.375	Philadelphia Stars	Negro National League II	Roy Campanella†	.369	
1945	Ed Steele	.394	Birmingham Black Barons	Negro American League	Jackie Robinson†	.375	
1946	Monte Irvin†	.369	Newark Eagles	Negro National League II	Larry Doby	.365	
1946	Ted Strong ^{i}	.364	Cleveland Buckeyes	Negro American League	Clyde Nelson	.361	
1947	Henry Kimbro	.385	Baltimore Elite Giants	Negro National League II	Johnny Washington	.375	
1947	Willard Brown†	.377	Kansas City Monarchs	Negro American League	Archie Ware	.370	
1948	Artie Wilson	.433	Birmingham Black Barons	Negro American League	Willard Brown†	.408	
1948	Lester Lockett	.362	Baltimore Elite Giants	Negro National League II	Frankie Austin	.356	

== Footnotes ==
- ^{L} Recognized "major leagues" include the current American League and National League and several defunct leagues—the American Association, the Federal League, the Players' League, the Union Association—along with seven leagues of Negro league baseball: the Negro National League (1920–1931), the Eastern Colored League (1923–1928), American Negro League (1929), East-West League (1932), Negro Southern League (1932), Negro National League (1933–1948), and Negro American League (1937–1948).
- ^{1902} Sources differ whether Nap Lajoie or Ed Delahanty won the American League batting title in 1902 and differ slightly over Lajoie's precise statistics that season. The Hall of Fame credits Lajoie with 129 hits in 352 at bats (.368) while MLB and Baseball-Reference.com show 133 hits in 352 at bats (.378). According to Baseball-Reference, a player qualified for a batting title prior to 1920 by appearing in 60% of his team's games—82 games in the 136 game schedule in 1902—and Lajoie appeared in 87 team games. As such, Baseball-Reference credits Lajoie with the 1902 title, with Delahanty's .376 batting average placing second. MLB's historical statistics leaderboards, however, use the modern standard of 3.1 plate appearances per team game (422 in that season) which Lajoie fell 37 short of. Thus, MLB credits Delahanty with the 1902 title with his .376 average. Similarly, the Hall of Fame lists the 1902 title on Delahanty's plaque and not Lajoie's.
- ^{1910} See 1910 Chalmers Award.
- ^{1954} Rules in 1954 required 2.6 at bats per team game, 400 for a 154-game schedule (the rule was changed in 1957 to the current requirement of 3.1 plate appearances per team game), to qualify for the title and hitless at bats could be added to reach this total. Ted Williams posted a .345 average in 1954 over only 386 at bats, and the required 14 hitless at bats dropped him to .3325, below Avila's league-leading .341 average.
- ^{a} While Baseball-Reference.com lists both Yelich and Marte with a batting average of .329 in 2019, Yelich's average is higher (.3292) than Marte's (.3286) if extended to four decimal places.
- ^{b} The 2020 Major League Baseball season was less than half the length of a typical season, starting in late July and condensed into 60 games due to the COVID-19 pandemic.
- ^{s} Suttles had 108 hits in 301 at-bats (.35880), while Wells had 113 hits in 315 at-bats (.35873)
- ^{a} Andrews played in 22 games and batted .398. However, among players with a minimum of 3.1 plate appearances / games, Baseball Reference lists Josh Gibson, who had batted .395 in 68 games in 1933, as leader among minimum qualifiers. In 2024, the MLB database lists Josh Gibson's 1933 season as having played 69 games with the Pittsburgh Crawfords.
- ^{b} David Whatley hit .396 in 27 games while Donald Reeves hit .384 in 40 games. Baseball Reference credits Whatley as having won the batting title.
- ^{c} Formerly, Johnny Washington was thought to have won the batting title. Further research has moved Irvin up from .371 to .380 while moving Washington from .377 to .367
- ^{d} Formerly, Marshall Riddle was thought to have batted .377 and won the batting title. Further research has found that Ed Mayweather batted .376 while Riddle batted .329
- ^{e} Cowan Hyde was once deemed the batting leader. Bostock has been found to have batted .466 in 23 games while Cowan Hyde batted .387 in 15 games. Third place was Ted Strong, who batted .348 in 35 games. Baseball Reference considers Bostock to have won the batting title as of 2025.
- ^{f} Due to ongoing research, Baseball Reference labeled that Bob Harvey did not qualify for the batting title, having played 27 games and batted .430. Instead, Roy Campanella (34 games) and Bill Hoskins (30 games) were the top two finishers. Campanella collected 54 hits on 139 at-bats (.3884) that edged out Hoskins, who had 45 hits on 116 at-bats (.3879)
- ^{g} Wilson was formerly believed to have hit .421 in 22 games. However, he has now been found to have batted .379 in 31 games.
- ^{h} Austin was thought to have batted .377 (in 47 games) while Campanella was at .385 (in 52 games). However now Austin is thought to have batted .375 (in 50 games) while Campanella is now tabbed at having batted .369 (in 56 games)
- ^{i} At one point in time, Archie Ware was thought to be the batting champion with a .423 batting average. Further research reveals Ted Strong batted .364 in 34 games, Clyde Nelson batted .361 in 19 games, and Ware batted .358 in 18 games.
