= Warg (disambiguation) =

A warg (an anglicised form of Old Norse vargr) is a fictional demonic species of wolves created by J.R.R. Tolkien.

Warg or WARG may also refer to:

- Warg, Afghanistan, a village
- WARG, a radio station from Argo Community High School in Summit, Illinois
- Warg, a person able to enter the mind of an animal and control their actions, synonymous with skinchanger in the A Song of Ice and Fire / Game of Thrones franchise

== People with the surname ==
- Cajsa Warg (1703–1769), Swedish cookbook author
- Fredrik Warg (born 1979), Swedish ice hockey player
- Gottfrid Svartholm (born 1984), Swedish computer specialist and co-founder of The Pirate Bay
- Stefan Warg (born 1990), Swedish ice hockey player

== See also ==
- Varg (disambiguation)
- WORG (disambiguation)
