= Ed Mayweather =

American baseball player (1909–1966)

- First baseman / Right fielder
- Born: November 26, 1909; Shreveport, Louisiana, U.S.
- Died: February 19, 1966 (aged 56); Kansas City, Missouri, U.S.
- Batted: Left Threw: Left

Negro league baseball debut
- 1935, for the Kansas City Monarchs

Last appearance
- 1942, for the New York Black Yankees

Teams
- Kansas City Monarchs (1935, 1937–1938); St. Louis Stars/St. Louis–New Orleans Stars (1939–1941); New York Black Yankees (1942)

Career highlights and awards
- Negro American League batting champion (1940)

Eldridge Everett Mayweather (November 26, 1909 – February 19, 1966) was an American professional baseball first baseman and right fielder in the Negro leagues between 1935 and 1942.

== Biography ==
A native of Shreveport, Louisiana, Mayweather made his Negro leagues debut in 1935 with the Kansas City Monarchs, and played with the Monarchs through 1938. He spent the following three seasons with the St. Louis–New Orleans Stars, and finished his career in 1942 with the New York Black Yankees. Mayweather was selected to play in the East–West All-Star Game in 1937 and 1940. He died in Kansas City, Missouri in 1966 at age 56.
