= Jesse Douglas (baseball) =

American baseball player (1916–1979)

- Infielder
- Born: March 27, 1916; Longview, Texas, U.S.
- Died: January 6, 1979 (aged 62); Los Angeles, California, U.S.
- Batted: Left Threw: Right

debut
- 1940, for the Kansas City Monarchs

Last appearance
- 1945, for the Chicago American Giants

Career statistics
- Batting average: .290
- Home runs: 1
- Runs batted in: 46
- Stats at Baseball Reference

Teams
- Kansas City Monarchs (1940); Birmingham Black Barons (1941–1942); Chicago American Giants (1944–1945)

Career highlights and awards
- Negro American League batting champion (1944)

Jesse Warren Douglas (March 27, 1916 – January 6, 1979) was an American Negro league infielder between 1937 and 1951.

A native of Longview, Texas, Douglas broke into the Negro leagues in 1937 with the Kansas City Monarchs. He batted .400 in 1944 to lead the Negro American League that year. He played on several teams through the 1951 season, and was selected to play in the East–West All-Star Game in 1950. Douglas also played in the Mexican League, and from 1951 to 1958 played minor league baseball. He died in Los Angeles, California in 1979 at age 62. He was interred at Rose Hills Memorial Park.
