= Varg =

Varg may most commonly refer to:

- Warg, a fictional demonic wolf created by author J. R. R. Tolkien
- An anglicised form of Old Norse vargr, relating to wolves in Germanic mythology

Varg or VARG may also refer to:

== People with the name ==
- Bert-Åke Varg, Swedish actor and singer
- Inga Varg (born 1952), Swedish architect
- Paul A. Varg (1912–1994), American historian
- Varg Støvland, Norwegian footballer
- Varg Vikernes (born 1973), Norwegian musician
- Varg²™, a Swedish electronic musician

== Fictional characters ==
- Detective Varg, a character created by Alexander McCall Smith
- Varg Veum, a character created by the Norwegian author Gunnar Staalesen

== Other ==
- Varg (band), a German heavy metal band
- Varg, Iran, a village in Shirvan County, Iran
- VARG, ICAO code for Ratnagiri Airport, India

== See also ==
- Varga (disambiguation)
- Warg (disambiguation)
