= Johnny Washington (first baseman) =

American baseball player (1916–1984)

- First baseman
- Born: January 9, 1916; Montgomery, Alabama, U.S.
- Died: July 22, 1984 (aged 68); Detroit, Michigan, U.S.
- Batted: Left Threw: Right

Negro league baseball debut
- 1936, for the Pittsburgh Crawfords

Last appearance
- 1948, for the Baltimore Elite Giants

Career statistics
- Batting average: .313
- Hits: 462
- Home runs: 13
- Runs batted in: 257
- Stolen bases: 33

Teams
- Montgomery Grey Sox (1933); Birmingham Black Barons (1934); Pittsburgh Crawfords (1936–1938); New York Black Yankees (1938–1940); Almendares (Winter 1939−1940); Baltimore Elite Giants (1941, 1946–1948)

Career highlights and awards
- 3× All-Star (1936, 1947, 1947²); Negro National League batting champion (1940)
Military career
Allegiance	United States
Branch	United States Army
Service years	1942–1945
Conflicts	World War II

John G. Washington (January 9, 1916 – July 22, 1984) was an American Negro league first baseman in the 1930s and 1940s.

A native of Montgomery, Alabama, Washington made his Negro leagues debut in 1933 with the Montgomery Grey Sox and the following year with the Birmingham Black Barons in the minor league Negro Southern League. In 1936 he moved up to the major league Pittsburgh Crawfords. Washington played three seasons for Pittsburgh, then went on to play several seasons with the New York Black Yankees and the Baltimore Elite Giants through 1948.

In 1940, he batted .377 in 29 games, which was the best among all Negro National League batters to make him a batting champion. The following year, he batted .301, his fourth of six seasons where he batted .300. Washington served in the United States Army from 1942 to 1945. He batted .283 for Baltimore in 63 games (a career high) before batting .375 in 1947 and closing his career out in 1948 by batting .298 in 56 games. His final appearance in the Negro leagues on the national stage was with the Negro National League Championship Series that year. Facing the Homestead Grays, he went 7-for-17 (.412) before the Elite Giants lost in four games.

He died in Detroit, Michigan in 1984 at age 68.
