= Varga =

Varga may refer to:

- Varga (surname), a Hungarian surname, includes a list of people with the name
- Varga, Hungary, a village in Hungary
- Varga (astrology), a technical division in Indian astrology
- Varga (band), a Canadian metal band
- Varga (comics), a Filipino comic book character
  - Komiks Presents: Varga, a Philippines TV series
- Varga girls, World War-II era pin-ups by Alberto Vargas
- Varga Studio, a Hungarian animation studio
- Varga 2150 Kachina, an American-made single-engine airplane
- Varga, a character in the Doctor Who serial The Ice Warriors
- Varga Plants, a poisonous plant from Doctor Who

== See also ==
- Varg (disambiguation)
- Vargas (disambiguation)
- Wergea
