= Bill Carter (baseball) =

American baseball player

- Infielder
- Bats: Unknown Throws: Unknown

Career statistics
- Batting average: .322
- Hits: 64
- Runs batted in: 24
- Stolen bases: 3
- Stats at Baseball Reference

Teams
- Birmingham Black Barons (1930, 1932, 1937-1938); Little Rock Grays (1932); St. Louis Stars (1937)

Career highlights and awards
- Negro American League batting champion (1937)

William Carter was a Negro league baseball player in the 1930s.

He played for the Birmingham Black Barons from 1930 to 1932 and again from 1937 to 1938. He also played for the Little Rock Grays in 1932 and the St. Louis Stars in 1937.
