= Dior Vargas =

Dior Vargas is an American Latina feminist mental health activist and the instigator of a project focused on creating a community to eradicate the stigma of mental illness for people of color. She is based in her native New York City.

== Background and education ==
Dior Vargas was born in New York City. She graduated from Smith College in 2009 with a Bachelor of Arts in Women and Gender Studies. She went on to earn a Master's degree in Publishing from Pace University in 2011. Her thesis was on the publishing industry's changing landscape from print to digital and its impact on The Feminist Press. She went to New York University to earn her Master's in Public Health and graduated in 2019.

== Activist work ==
Dior Vargas began her career as an activist while studying at Smith College, while interning for STEPS to End Family Violence, a holistic program of services for victims of gender-based violence. She was an editorial intern at The Feminist Press - an educational nonprofit organization founded to advance women's rights and amplify feminist perspectives. She worked as a marketing intern for Gloria Feldt, former CEO and president of Planned Parenthood. She was a CrisisTextLine crisis counselor and a facilitator for the Young Adult Support Group at NAMI-NYC Metro.

== People of Color and Mental Illness Photo Project ==
Dior Vargas is the creator of the "People of Color and Mental Illness Photo Project". The project focuses on the lack of representation of people of color who deal with mental illnesses. "The project, so far, includes over 60 photos of men and women of color. These individuals submitted photos of themselves to Vargas holding signs that identify their name, the mental health issue they battle and, if they wished to share, an important message they want to express." Illnesses such as PTSD, depression, obsessive compulsive disorder, anxiety disorder and more, are all represented by photos sent in and posted on the project's website. The idea is to address and overcome the belief, which is strongly set by the media, that mental illness is a "white persons disease." Vargas has stated the project stemmed from her own experiences as a person of color battling mental illness. "'Mental health awareness is extremely personal and important to me, because I identify as a person of color and I live with depression and anxiety,' she said. “[This project] is a response to the exclusion of people of color in the media's representation of mental illness.'" Her strong role as an activist and personal experience led her to launch the project and create a resource and sense of community for people who share a similar experience.

The project utilizes the tools of social media and has taken advantage of the hashtags #NoStigma and #NoDiscrimination in order to encourage people to submit their own photos as well as provide a community of support for other people of color. An exhibit and panel discussion was held at La Casa Azu bookstore in Harlem as a way to begin discussions in diverse neighborhoods. The panel was made up of Imade Nibokun ( "Depressed While Black"); Terrell Jermaine Starr (AlterNet); Ingrid Gomez, a licensed clinical social worker; and Allie Hill (National Alliance on Mental Illness, Mid-Hudson). On June 18 Vargas launched a Kickstarter campaign to raise money to hire photographers and studio space in order to take higher quality photos of participants. After a month of the campaign Vargas raised $500 over her goal of $6,000 in order to support the next phase of her project which is currently underway.

== Participation and honors ==
- Participant in "Out in Front New York", a training and community-building program aimed at preparing LGBTQ people to be the next generation of Movement leaders.
- Participant in "Progressive Women’s Voices", a media and leadership training program for women in the country
- Champion of Change for Disability Advocacy Across Generations at The White House.
- Advisory Board Member for Suzanne Lacy for "Between the Door and the Street"
- Crisis Counselor on the Crisis Text Line
- Young Adult Support Group Facilitator NAMI-NYC Metro
- Voices of the Year Honoree for Impact
- Cookie Gant and Bill Compton LGBT Leadership Award at the Alternatives Conference
