= David Whatley (baseball) =

American baseball player

Speed Whatley
- Outfielder
- Born: November 10, 1914; Griffin, Georgia, U.S.
- Died: March 13, 1961 (aged 46); Oakland, California, U.S.
- Batted: Left Threw: Right

Negro league baseball debut
- 1937, for the Birmingham Black Barons

Last appearance
- 1944, for the New York Black Yankees

Negro leagues (Note: On December 16, 2020, Major League Baseball declared that seven Negro leagues, from the span of 1920–1948, were to be recognized as major leagues. Whatley's statistics reflect his time in the Negro leagues.) statistics
- Batting average: .330
- Home runs: 12
- Runs batted in: 105

Teams
- Birmingham Black Barons (1937–1938); Memphis Red Sox (1938); Cleveland Bears (1939); Homestead Grays (1939–1942, 1944); New York Black Yankees (1944)

Career highlights and awards
- Negro American League batting champion (1938)

David Samuel Whatley (November 10, 1914 – March 13, 1961), nicknamed "Speed" and "Hammer Man", was an American Negro league outfielder in the 1930s and 1940s.

A native of Griffin, Georgia, Whatley made his Negro leagues debut with the Birmingham Black Barons in 1937. He batted .396 and led the Negro American League in batting average in his second season in 1938. He played for the Homestead Grays from 1939 to 1942, being on the roster for three consecutive Negro National League II pennants. He then served in the United States Army during World War II. He returned to the Grays during their 1944 Negro World Series championship season, but finished the season with the New York Black Yankees. Whatley died in Oakland, California in 1961 at age 46.
