= WORG (disambiguation) =

WORG is a radio station (100.3 FM) licensed to Elloree, South Carolina.

WORG may also refer to:

- Warg, a wolf in Norse mythology that is sometimes anglicized as worg
- WHXT, a radio station (103.9 FM) licensed to Orangeburg, South Carolina, which held the call sign WORG-FM from 1976 to 1985
- WPJK, a radio station (1580 AM) licensed to Orangeburg, South Carolina, which held the call sign WORG from 1984 to 1985
