= Tetelo Vargas =

Dominican baseball player (born 1906)

- Outfielder / Shortstop / First baseman
- Born: April 11, 1906; Santo Domingo, Dominican Republic
- Died: December 30, 1971 (aged 65); Guayama, Puerto Rico
- Batted: Right Threw: Right

Negro leagues debut
- 1927, for the Cuban Stars (East)

Last Negro leagues appearance
- 1944, for the New York Cubans

Negro leagues (Note: On December 16, 2020, Major League Baseball declared certain Negro leagues, from the span of 1920–1948, to be "major" leagues. Vargas' statistics reflect his time in the Negro leagues from 1927, 1929 and 1941–1943.) statistics
- Batting average: .363
- Hits: 186
- Home runs: 3
- Runs batted in: 86
- Stolen bases: 9

Teams
- Cuban Stars (East) (1927, 1929); New York Cubans (1941–1943)

Career highlights and awards
- 3× All-Star (1942, 1943); Negro National League batting champion (1943); Negro league baseball records: Single-season Batting average: .471 (1943) (Note: Minimum 3.1 plate appearances per team game.)

Juan Esteban Vargas Marcano (April 11, 1906 – December 30, 1971), better known as Tetelo Vargas, and nicknamed "El Gamo Dominicano" or "the Dominican Deer", was a Dominican professional baseball outfielder, shortstop and first baseman in the Negro leagues.

== Baseball career ==
An athletic teenager, Vargas spent his early years playing pick-up baseball games, which helped him develop ability and strength.

By 1927, when Vargas was 21, scouts from the United States and the Dominican Republic had noticed him. Vargas was Black, however, and he became a member of the Negro leagues' famed New York Cubans. Meanwhile, at home, he was signed by the Leones del Escogido, one of the four original Dominican Republic winter baseball league teams that remain in competition.

Vargas gained recognition around the Caribbean and in New York City, establishing a Negro league record by hitting home runs in seven consecutive at bats. In 1932, Vargas went to play in Venezuela, where he became a star and remained until 1938, when the New York Cubans re-signed him.

In 1940, Vargas played in the Puerto Rican Winter League. He eventually became an established resident of Puerto Rico. Vargas was once again signed by the New York Cubans from 1941 to 1944, his last year as an active player in the Negro leagues. Meanwhile, in Caguas, Puerto Rico, Vargas established himself as an All-Star, playing in the Puerto Rican All-Star game multiple times during the 1940s. At the time, a series of different sports competitions preceded the All-Star game in Puerto Rico, all of them involving baseball players and for the All-Star game's public's enjoyment. Vargas, who won various stolen base titles through his career, won a number of sprint races as an All-Star player in Puerto Rico. He went on to play with the Guayama Witches and the Santurce Crabbers before heading to the Mexican Pacific Winter League in 1952. Vargas, in the twilight of his career, returned to the Dominican Republic's winter league also in 1952, this time with the Estrellas Orientales team. At the age of 46, he led the Dominican Republic league with a batting average of .350.

Vargas managed the Dominican Republic national baseball team at the 1952 Amateur World Series.

Vargas retired from baseball in 1953, after having played 27 seasons in five countries.

== Statistics ==
Vargas hit .472 while playing for the New York Cubans in the Negro National League in 1943. While Baseball Reference recognizes this (listed as .471) as the highest single-season batting average in MLB history, MLB.com instead recognizes Josh Gibson's .466 average, hit during the same season.

Apart from hitting .350 in 1952 in the Dominican Republic's winter league, Vargas also led the Puerto Rican winter league in batting average three times, hitting .410 in 1943, and winning back to back titles in 1946 and 1947, when he hit .382 and .362, respectively. Vargas played a number of exhibition games against Major League Baseball's New York Yankees, averaging .500 against Yankees pitchers.

== Positions ==
Vargas played a number of positions on the baseball field, including right field, left field, center field, shortstop and second base.

== After baseball ==
Vargas was idolized both in the Dominican Republic and in Puerto Rico, but he decided to settle in the Puerto Rican city of Guayama, where he had previously starred for the local team. He remarried in 1954 in Puerto Rico and lived a rather quiet, humble life in Guayama with his wife, Violeta Enchautegui de Vargas and three daughters Carmen, Ana and Iris and son Juan Esteban Vargas Jr.

Vargas died on December 30, 1971, after battling lung cancer, and is buried next to his wife in Guayama's main cemetery (Cementerio Municipal de Guayama).

Vargas was elected to the Puerto Rican baseball Hall of Fame. Because of his involvement as a player with the New York Cubans, Vargas is also a member of the Cuban Baseball Hall of Fame.

The stadium in San Pedro de Macorís, home of the Estrellas Orientales team, is named in his honor.
