= Rodrigo Vargas =

Rodrigo Vargas may refer to:

- Rodrigo Vargas (fighter) (born 1985), Mexican professional mixed martial artist
- Rodrigo Vargas (soccer, born 1978), Australian soccer centre-back
- Rodrigo Vargas (footballer, born 1989), Bolivian football midfielder
- Rodrigo Vargas (footballer, born 1994), Bolivian football forward

== See also ==
- Miguel Rodrigo Vargas (born 1978), Portuguese footballer
