= Gloria Maira Vargas =

Chilean economist and politician

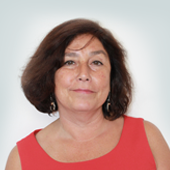
Gloria Maira Vargas in 2014

Gloria Andrea Maira Vargas (Concepción, May 4, 1958) is a Chilean economist and politician, former member of the Citizen Left party (IC) and current member of the Democratic Revolution (RD). She served as deputy director of the National Women's Service (Sernam) of Chile, during the second government of Michelle Bachelet, from 2014 to 2015.

== Family and studies ==
Gloria Maira Vargas was born in Concepción, Chile, and is the daughter of politician Octavio Víctor Maira Lamas and Inés Lucy Vargas Delaunnoy. Her mother served as an undersecretary of Justice during the government of Salvador Allende. She is married to Miguel Luna García and they have a daughter named Laura.

She holds a degree in economics and a master's degree in social sciences with a mention in gender from the Latin American Faculty of Social Sciences (Flacso).

== Public career ==
Maira Vargas specializes in human rights and women's rights, carrying out research, consultancy, training, and project development and evaluation in these areas, both in Chile and in United Nations institutions. She has worked as a researcher and consultant for entities such as the World Bank (WB) and the Pan American Health Organization (PAHO). She is also the author and co-author of several publications on violence against women, femicide, and women's rights.

Between 2014 and 2016, she served as a member of the Political Commission for the political party Citizen Left (IC). In 2016, she joined the founding team of Democratic Revolution (RD). Since March 2022, she has been serving as the Head of the Regional Unit of the Undersecretary of Regional and Administrative Development (URS) in the Valparaíso region.
