= Varda =

Varda may refer to:

== People ==
- Agnès Varda (1928–2019), French film director and professor
- Danielle Varda, American politician
- Jean Varda (1893–1971), Greek artist
- Ratko Varda (born 1979), Bosnian basketball player
- Rosalie Varda (born 1958), French costume designer, producer, writer and actress; daughter of Agnès

== Places ==
- Mount Varda, a mountain in the Golan Heights
- Varda, Greece, a town in Elis, Greece
- Várda, a village in Somogy, Hungary
- Varda, Slovenia, a settlement
- Varda, Kosjerić, a village in Serbia
- Varda Viaduct, a railway viaduct in southern Turkey
- 174567 Varda, a possible dwarf planet named after Tolkien's Varda

== Other uses ==
- Varda (Middle-earth), a character in J. R. R. Tolkien's legendarium
- Varda Space Industries, an American space research company
- Voice Activated Radio Dispatched Alarm, a type of alarm system
- 174567 Varda, a possible dwarf planet named after Tolkien's Varda

== See also ==
- Vardan, a name
- Vardar (disambiguation)
