= List of Colorado Rockies Opening Day starting pitchers =

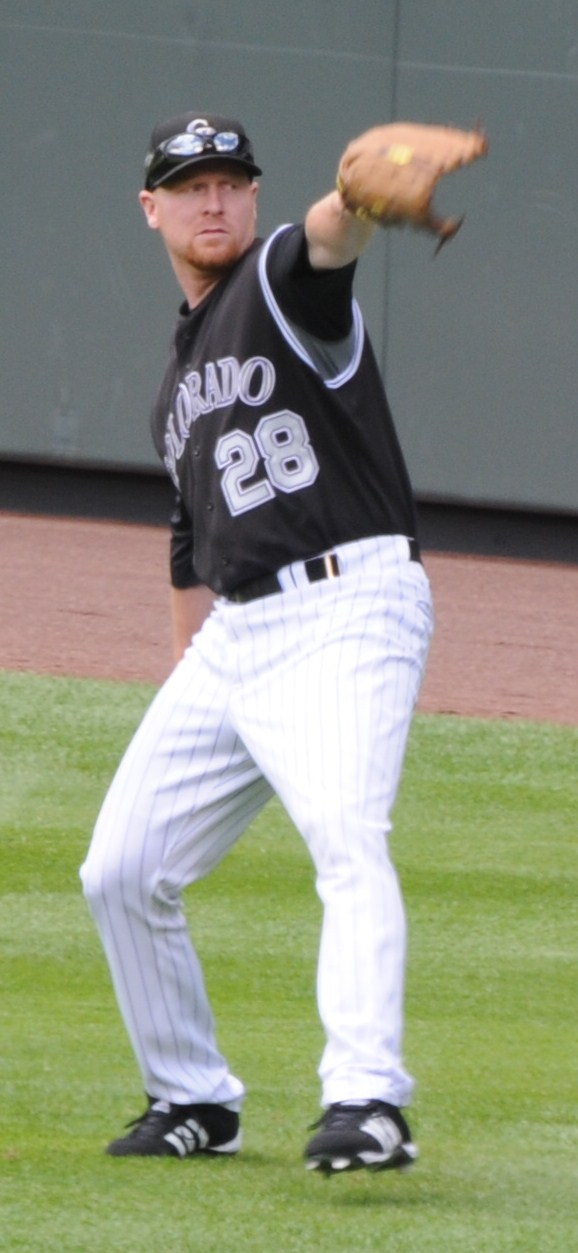
Aaron Cook, the 2007 Opening Day starter

The Colorado Rockies are a Major League Baseball (MLB) franchise based in Denver, Colorado. They play in the National League West division. The first game of the new baseball season for a team is played on Opening Day, and being named the Opening Day starter is an honor, which is often given to the player who is expected to lead the pitching staff that season, though there are various strategic reasons why a team's best pitcher might not start on Opening Day. The Rockies have used 20 different Opening Day starting pitchers in their 28 seasons. Since the Rockies' first season in 1993, the 20 starters have a combined Opening Day record of eleven wins, nine losses (11–9), and eight no decisions. No decisions are only awarded to the starting pitcher if the game is won or lost after the starting pitcher has left the game.

Eight Rockies pitchers have started on two Opening Days: Kevin Ritz, Darryl Kile, Mike Hampton, Jason Jennings, Aaron Cook, Ubaldo Jiménez, Jorge de la Rosa, and Jon Gray. Kile has the best Opening Day record with two wins and no losses. Armando Reynoso is the only Rockies pitcher to start on Opening Day in Colorado's former home of Mile High Stadium. Rockies starting pitchers have an Opening Day record of four wins, two losses, and one no decision when at home. With the exception of one lost game at Mile High Stadium, the other games were played at Colorado's current home stadium of Coors Field. On the road for Opening Day, Colorado starting pitchers have accumulated a record of seven wins, seven losses, and seven no decisions. The Rockies have a record of two wins and three losses on Opening Day for seasons in which they would later go on to participate in post-season play.

The longest Opening Day winning streak for Rockies starting pitchers is three years, when Colorado won in 2004, 2005, and 2006, under three different pitchers, Shawn Estes, Joe Kennedy, and Jason Jennings. Rockies starters have lost twice in two consecutive years, once in 1993 and 1994, and once from 2002 to 2003.

== Key ==
Season	Each year is linked to an article about that particular Rockies season.
W	Win
L	Loss
ND (W)	No decision by starting pitcher; Rockies won game
ND (L)	No decision by starting pitcher; Rockies lost game
Pitcher (#)	Number of appearances as Opening Day starter with the Rockies
*	Advanced to the post-season
**	NL Champions

== Pitchers ==
Season	Pitcher	Decision	Opponent	Location	Ref(s)
1993	David Nied	L	New York Mets	Shea Stadium	
1994	Armando Reynoso	L	Philadelphia Phillies	Mile High Stadium	
1995*	Bill Swift	W	New York Mets	Coors Field	
1996	Kevin Ritz	ND (W)	Philadelphia Phillies	Veterans Stadium	
1997	Kevin Ritz (2)	ND (L)	Cincinnati Reds	Riverfront Stadium	
1998	Darryl Kile	W	Arizona Diamondbacks	Bank One Ballpark	
1999	Darryl Kile (2)	W	San Diego Padres	Qualcomm Stadium	
2000	Pedro Astacio	L	Atlanta Braves	Turner Field	
2001	Mike Hampton	W	St. Louis Cardinals	Coors Field	
2002	Mike Hampton (2)	L	St. Louis Cardinals	Busch Memorial Stadium	
2003	Jason Jennings	L	Houston Astros	Minute Maid Park	
2004	Shawn Estes	W	Arizona Diamondbacks	Bank One Ballpark	
2005	Joe Kennedy	W	San Diego Padres	Coors Field	
2006	Jason Jennings (2)	W	Arizona Diamondbacks	Coors Field	
2007**	Aaron Cook	L	Arizona Diamondbacks	Coors Field	
2008	Kip Wells	ND (W)	St. Louis Cardinals	Busch Stadium	
2009*	Aaron Cook (2)	ND (L)	Arizona Diamondbacks	Chase Field	
2010	Ubaldo Jiménez	W	Milwaukee Brewers	Miller Park	
2011	Ubaldo Jiménez (2)	ND (L)	Arizona Diamondbacks	Coors Field	
2012	Jeremy Guthrie	W	Houston Astros	Minute Maid Park	
2013	Jhoulys Chacín	ND (L)	Milwaukee Brewers	Miller Park	
2014	Jorge De La Rosa	L	Miami Marlins	Marlins Park	
2015	Kyle Kendrick	W	Milwaukee Brewers	Miller Park	
2016	Jorge De La Rosa (2)	ND (W)	Arizona Diamondbacks	Chase Field	
2017*	Jon Gray	ND (W)	Milwaukee Brewers	Miller Park	
2018*	Jon Gray (2)	L	Arizona Diamondbacks	Chase Field	
2019	Kyle Freeland	W	Miami Marlins	Marlins Park	
2020	German Marquez	L	Texas Rangers	Globe Life Field	
2021	German Marquez (2)	ND (W)	Los Angeles Dodgers	Coors Field	
2022	Kyle Freeland (2)	L	Los Angeles Dodgers	Coors Field	
2023	German Marquez (3)	W	San Diego Padres	Petco Park	
2024	Kyle Freeland (3)	L	Arizona Diamondbacks	Chase Field	
2025	Kyle Freeland (4)	ND (L)	Tampa Bay Rays	George M. Steinbrenner Field	
2026	Kyle Freeland (5)	L	Miami Marlins	LoanDepot Park	
