= Charlie Blackmon =

American former baseball player (born 1986)

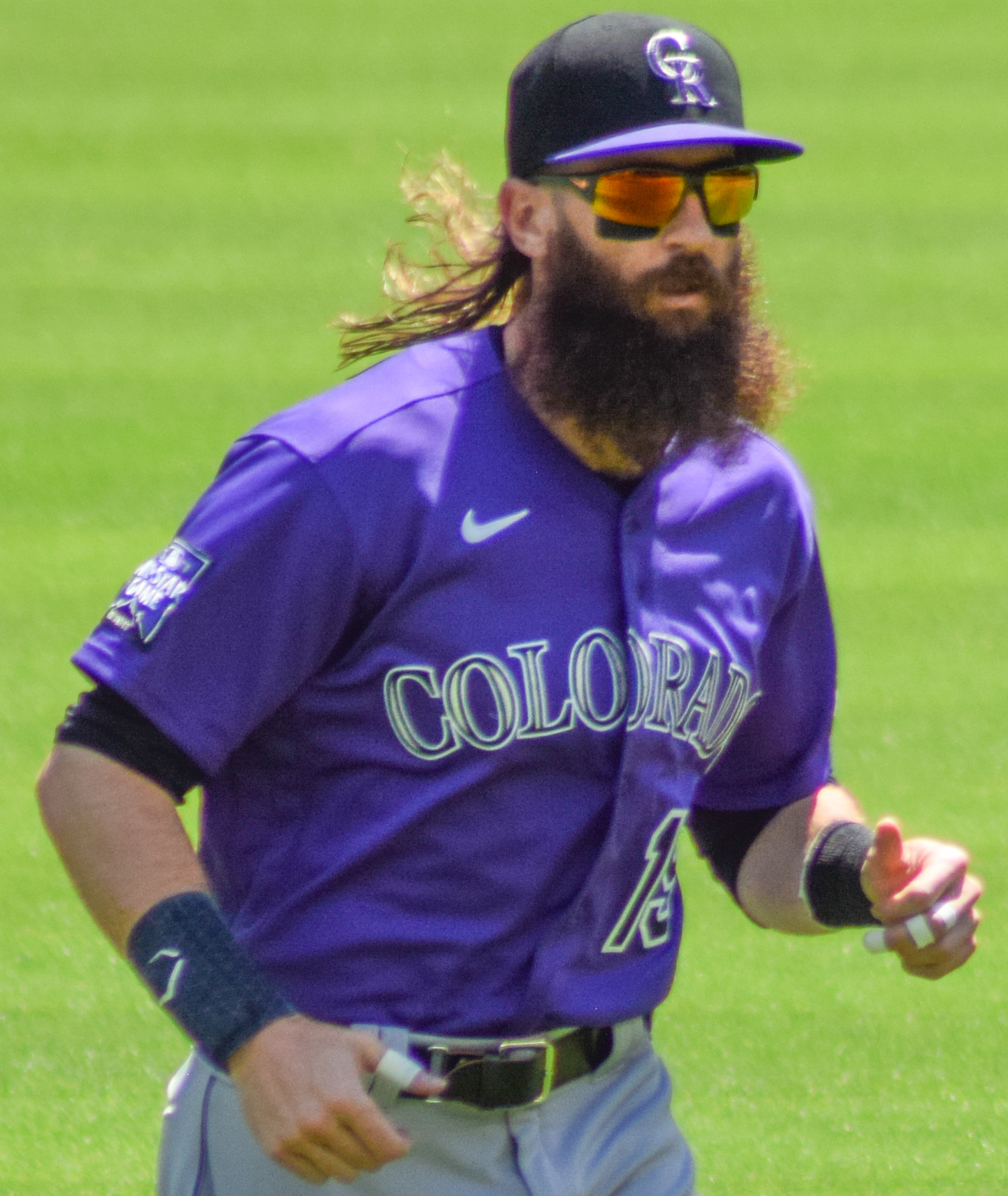
- Blackmon with the Colorado Rockies in 2021
- Outfielder
- Born: July 1, 1986 (age 40); Dallas, Texas, U.S.
- Batted: Left Threw: Left

MLB debut
- June 7, 2011, for the Colorado Rockies

Last MLB appearance
- September 29, 2024, for the Colorado Rockies

MLB statistics
- Batting average: .293
- Home runs: 227
- Runs batted in: 801
- Stats at Baseball Reference

Teams
- Colorado Rockies (2011–2024)

Career highlights and awards
- 4× All-Star (2014, 2017–2019); 2× Silver Slugger Award (2016, 2017); NL batting champion (2017)

Charles Cobb Blackmon (born July 1, 1986), nicknamed "Chuck Nazty", is an American former professional baseball outfielder who spent his entire 14-year Major League Baseball (MLB) career with the Colorado Rockies. He made his MLB debut in 2011. Blackmon throws and bats left-handed, stands 6 feet 3 inches (1.91 m), and weighs 220.4 pounds (100.0 kg).

A native of Dallas, Texas, Blackmon attended the Georgia Institute of Technology and played college baseball for the Yellow Jackets. The Rockies selected him in the second round of the 2008 amateur draft. Blackmon is a four-time MLB All-Star, a two-time Silver Slugger Award winner, and the 2017 National League batting champion.

== Amateur career ==
Born in Dallas, Texas, Blackmon is of partial English ancestry. Raised in Suwanee, Georgia, Blackmon was an outstanding baseball player at North Gwinnett High School, as a left-handed pitcher and outfielder. Aside from baseball, Blackmon also competed in basketball and football, and was named Academic Player of the Year three times.

Blackmon enrolled at Young Harris College and played college baseball for the school as a pitcher for two years. At Young Harris, Blackmon won 15 games and had 138 strikeouts in 127 innings for the school, and was drafted for the first time after his freshman season. In 2005, he played collegiate summer baseball in the Cape Cod Baseball League for the Cotuit Kettleers.

Blackmon received a scholarship to Georgia Tech and transferred in the fall of 2006. Blackmon had been recruited by Georgia Tech after his freshman season but returned to Young Harris for his sophomore season as he had promised the team he would play for two seasons. Blackmon continued to pitch until his fourth and final year at Georgia Tech, after redshirting due to elbow tendinitis. As a fourth-year junior outfielder for Georgia Tech, Blackmon hit .396, hit eight home runs, and stole 25 bases as the leadoff hitter. Blackmon also excelled academically, receiving various honors including being named to the 2008 ESPN The Magazine Academic All-America Second Team.

== Professional career ==
=== Draft and minor leagues ===
The Colorado Rockies selected Blackmon in the second round of the 2008 Major League Baseball draft. Blackmon had previously been drafted in the 28th round in the 2004 draft by the Florida Marlins as a pitcher and in the 20th round of the 2005 draft by the Boston Red Sox, declining to sign both times. He spent 2008 with the Tri-City Dust Devils, hitting .338 in 68 games. In 2009, he was promoted to the Modesto Nuts, and hit .307 with 30 stolen bases in 133 games. In 2010, he played for the Tulsa Drillers and started 2011 with the Colorado Springs Sky Sox.

=== Colorado Rockies ===
==== 2011–2016 ====
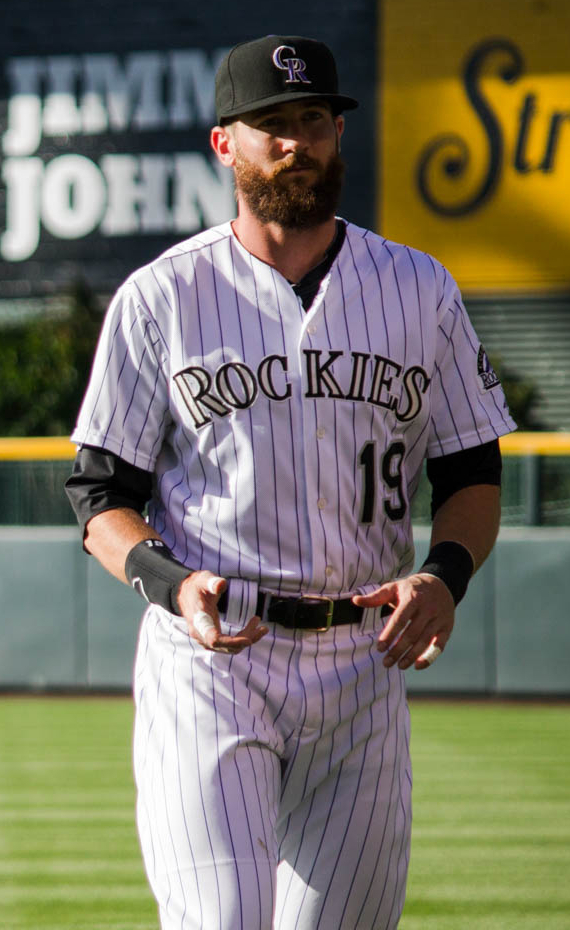
Blackmon with the Rockies in 2014

The Colorado Rockies called Blackmon up to the majors for the first time on June 6, 2011. Blackmon recorded his first MLB hit on June 8 against Dustin Moseley of the San Diego Padres with a one-out single to right field. He recorded his first MLB RBI on June 11 against Matt Guerrier of the Los Angeles Dodgers, driving in Seth Smith with a single. Blackmon hit his first MLB home run on July 1, his 25th birthday, as a pinch hitter against Joakim Soria. He broke his left foot while baserunning on July 7 and missed the rest of the season. He finished 2011 with a .255 batting average in 27 games.

Blackmon split the next two seasons between the Rockies and Triple-A. Combined in 2012 and 2013, Blackmon hit .301 with 8 home runs and 31 RBI in 124 games for the Rockies. After the 2013 season, the Rockies traded Dexter Fowler to the Houston Astros, creating an opening for Blackmon to win the center field job in 2014.

Entering the 2014 season, Blackmon competed for playing time in center field with Brandon Barnes, Corey Dickerson and Drew Stubbs. In the Rockies' home opener on April 4, Blackmon notched six hits from the leadoff spot in a 12–2 win over Arizona Diamondbacks. He homered, doubled three times, and tallied five RBI. He joined Ty Cobb, Jimmie Foxx, Edgardo Alfonzo, and Shawn Green as the only players in MLB history to have six hits, five RBI, and four extra-base hits in one game, a feat since matched by Anthony Rendon and Shohei Ohtani. Blackmon was named to the 2014 MLB All-Star Game, the first selection of his career. In his first full season in the majors, Blackmon finished with a .288 batting average, 28 stolen bases, and 19 home runs. In 2015, Blackmon stole a career-high 43 bases and hit .287.

On April 14, 2016, the Rockies placed Blackmon on the disabled list with turf toe. He returned to the lineup two weeks later. Blackmon was named the NL Player of the Week for the weeks of June 20 and August 15. At the conclusion of the 2016 season, Blackmon won a Silver Slugger Award for the first time in his career. He batted a slash line of .324/.381/.552, which were all the career highs up to that point. This went along with 29 home runs and 82 runs batted in.

==== 2017–2024 ====
Blackmon had a career year in 2017. For May 2017, Blackmon won his first NL Player of the Month Award. He led the NL with 42 hits and 5 triples, was second with a .359 batting average, fourth with 24 in runs scored, tied for fifth with RBI, and tied for seventh with a 1.037 on-base plus slugging (OPS). He was the starting center fielder in the 2017 MLB All-Star Game, batting leadoff. Blackmon set an MLB record for the most RBI by a leadoff hitter when he homered versus Hyun-Jin Ryu of the Dodgers on September 29 to reach 102 RBI, surpassing Darin Erstad's record set in 2000.

In 159 games played during 2017, Blackmon hit .331/.399/.601, winning the NL batting title. All three slash line statistics were the highest in his career. He became the first player in history to lead the major leagues in hits (213), runs scored (137), triples (14), and total bases (383) in the same season. He had the most total bases in a season since Derrek Lee in 2005. The Rockies finished the year with an 87–75 record, clinching an NL Wild Card spot. Blackmon was fifth in 2017 NL MVP voting.

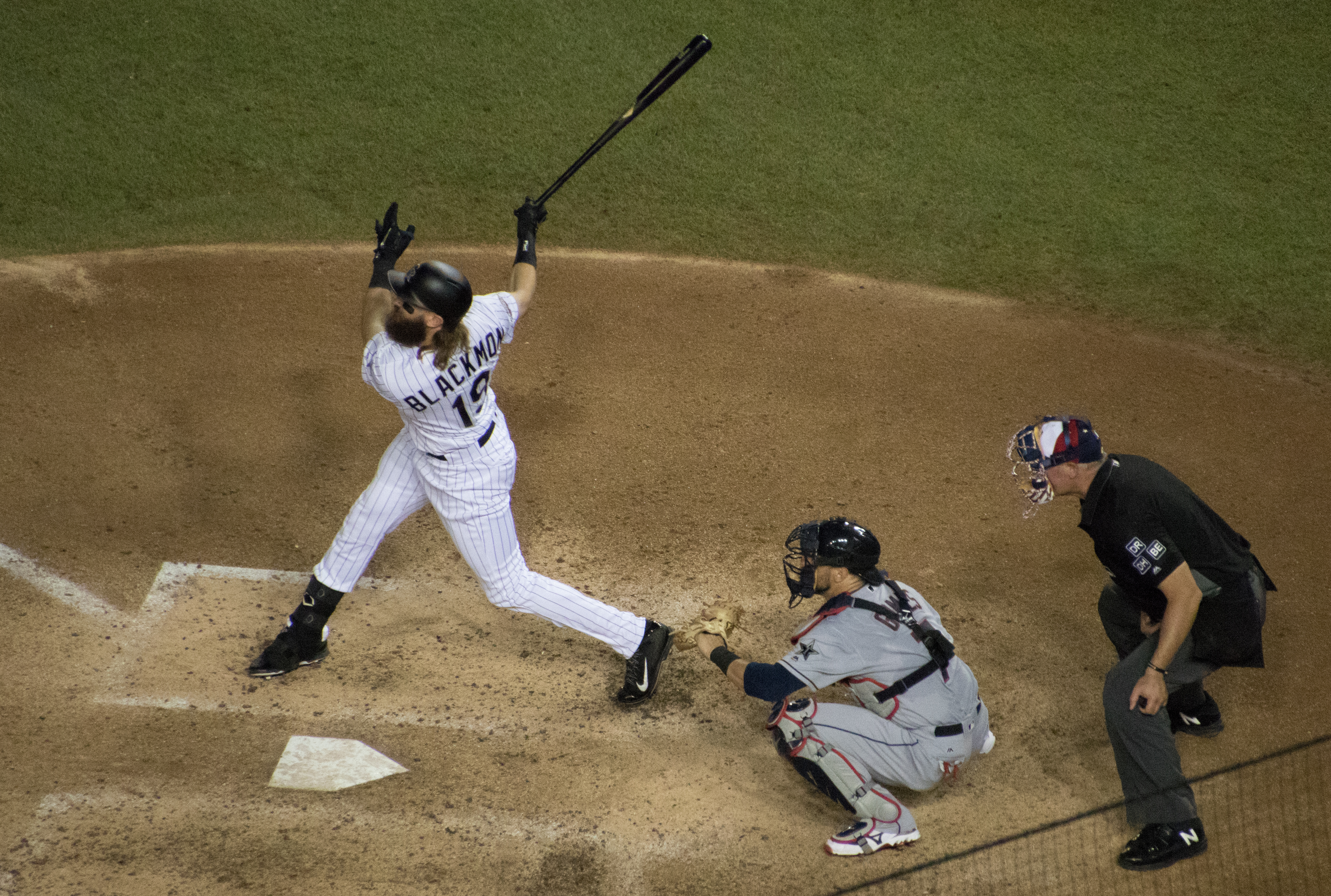
Blackmon at bat in the 2018 Major League Baseball All-Star Game

On April 4, 2018, Blackmon signed a six-year contract extension worth $108 million. Batting .276 with 17 home runs and 40 RBIs, he was named to the 2018 MLB All-Star Game. On September 30, he hit for the cycle against the Washington Nationals. He finished the 2018 season hitting .291/.358/.502 and led the National League with 119 runs scored. He had a hit, a walk and a run in the Rockies' Wild Card Game win over the Chicago Cubs, but hit only 1-for-12 as his team was swept by the Milwaukee Brewers in the National League Division Series.

In 2019, he batted .314/.364/.576 with 32 home runs and 112 runs scored. He was named to his fourth All-Star Game. In the shortened 2020 season, Blackmon hit .405 in his first 28 games, but regressed towards the tail end of the season, finishing with a .303 batting average and 6 home runs in 59 games. He led the Rockies with 42 RBI. In 2021, Blackmon batted .270/.351/.411 with 13 home runs and 78 RBIs. He led all National League outfielders with 14 assists.

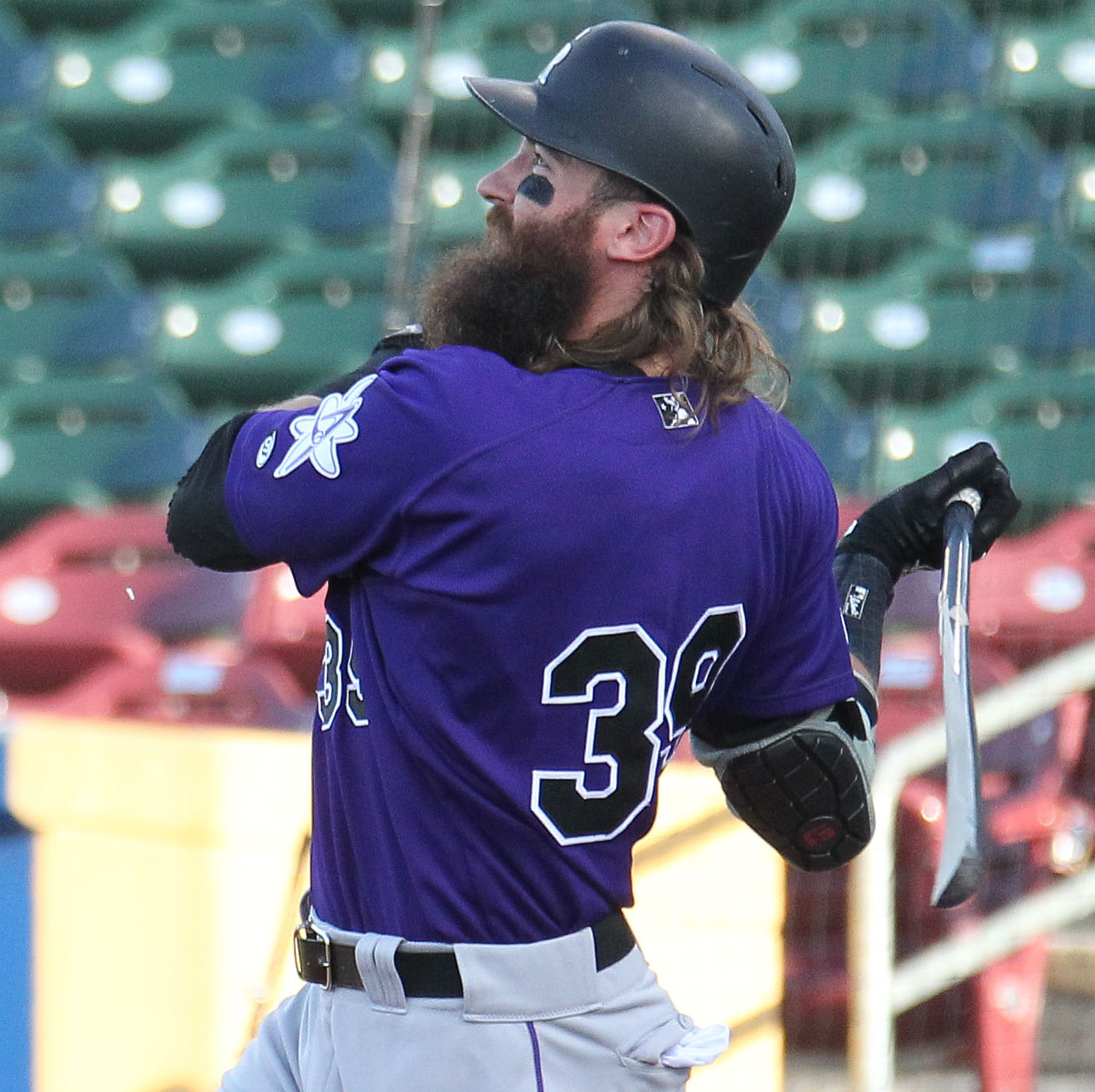
Blackmon with the Albuquerque Isotopes in 2019

For the 2022 season, Blackmon played in 135 games for Colorado, hitting .264/.314/.419 with 16 home runs and 78 RBI. On September 28, the Rockies announced that Blackmon would undergo arthroscopic surgery to repair a torn meniscus in his left knee, prematurely ending his season. Following the season, Blackmon exercised an $18 million player option to remain with the Rockies in 2023.

In 96 games for Colorado in 2023, he batted .279/.363/.440 with 8 home runs and 40 RBI. On September 29, 2023, Blackmon signed a one-year, $13 million extension with the Rockies.

On September 23, 2024, Blackmon announced his retirement at the conclusion of the 2024 season. In 124 games for the Rockies in 2024, he slashed .256/.329/.412 with 12 home runs and 52 RBI. When he retired, Blackmon led the Rockies in career triples and hit by pitches and was second to Todd Helton in games played, runs scored, hits, doubles, extra base hits, total bases, and strikeouts. He also ranked second in stolen bases and caught stealing behind Eric Young Sr.

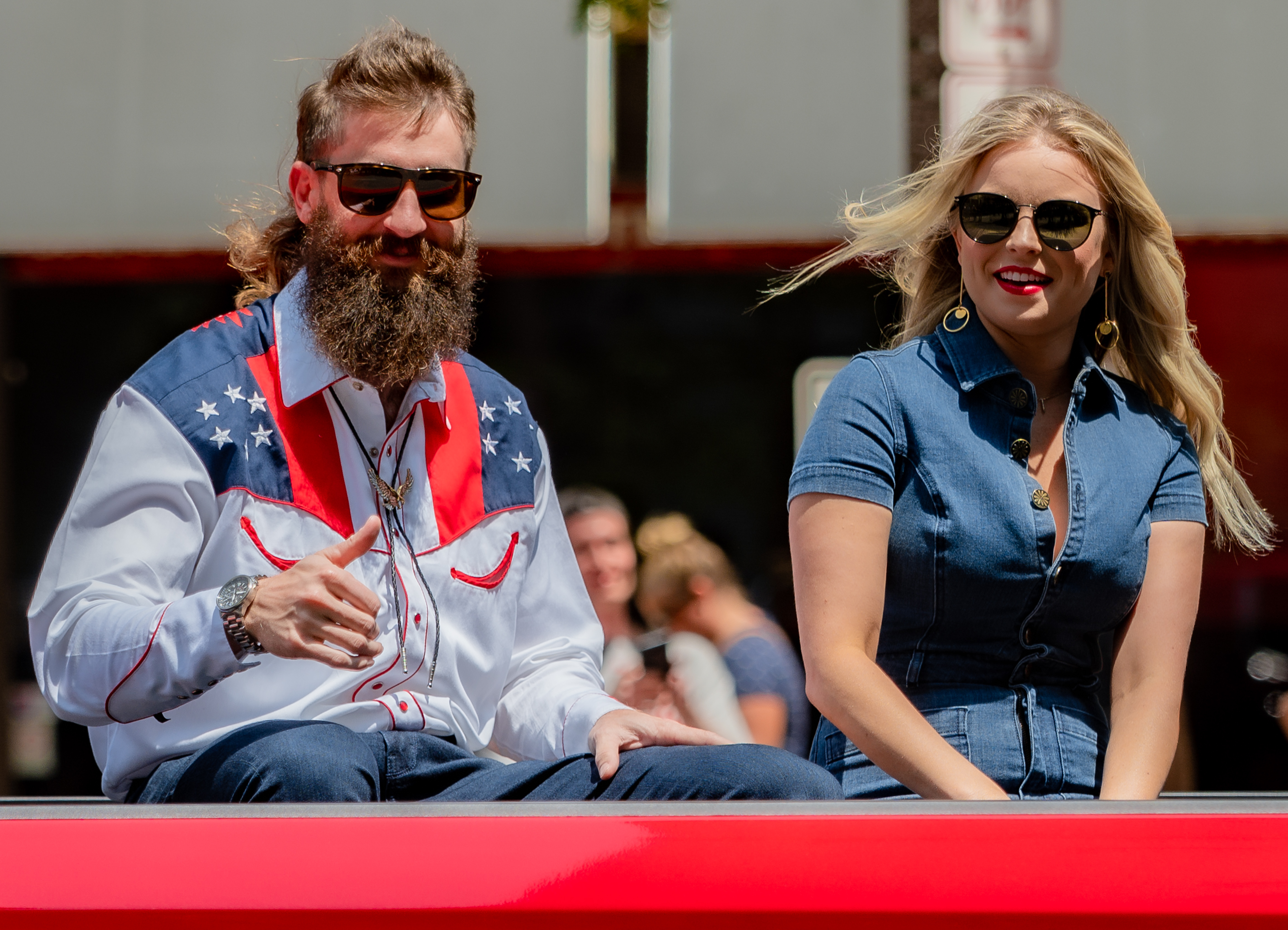
Blackmon and his wife Ashley in 2019

== Career statistics ==
In 1624 games over 14 seasons, Blackmon compiled a .293 batting average (1805-for-6165) with 996 runs, 334 doubles, 68 triples, 227 home runs, 801 runs batted in, 148 stolen bases, 485 walks, .353 on-base percentage and .479 slugging percentage. Defensively, he posted a .987 fielding percentage playing at all three outfield positions.

== Post-playing career ==
On January 25, 2025, Blackmon was hired by the Colorado Rockies to serve as a special assistant to general manager Bill Schmidt.

== Personal life ==
Blackmon is a Christian. He was in a Bible study group with the Rockies.

Blackmon and his wife, Ashley, were married in 2018. They have two children, Josie and Wyatt. Blackmon resided in the Belcaro neighborhood of Denver during the season.

Blackmon grew up as a fan of the Atlanta Braves. Blackmon's father, Myron, was a track and field athlete at Georgia Tech. Blackmon graduated from Georgia Tech in 2011 with a bachelor's degree in finance.

In 2016, Denver 7 reported that Blackmon, despite his Major League salary, drove the same 2004 Jeep Grand Cherokee to spring training every day that he had as a high school senior.

Blackmon used "Your Love" by The Outfield as his walkup song, with Rockies fans regularly singing the word "tonight" in the chorus.

== See also ==
- Colorado Rockies individual awards
- List of Georgia Institute of Technology alumni
- List of Major League Baseball annual runs scored leaders
- List of Major League Baseball annual triples leaders
- List of Major League Baseball players to hit for the cycle
- List of Major League Baseball single-game hits leaders
- List of Major League Baseball players who spent their entire career with one franchise
- List of people from Dallas

Awards and achievements
Preceded by Ryan Zimmerman; Josh Bell	National League Player of the Month; May 2017; June 2019	Succeeded by Andrew McCutchen; Paul Goldschmidt
Preceded by Christian Yelich	Hitting for the cycle September 30, 2018	Succeeded by Brock Holt
