= Pedro Astacio =

Dominican baseball player (born 1968)

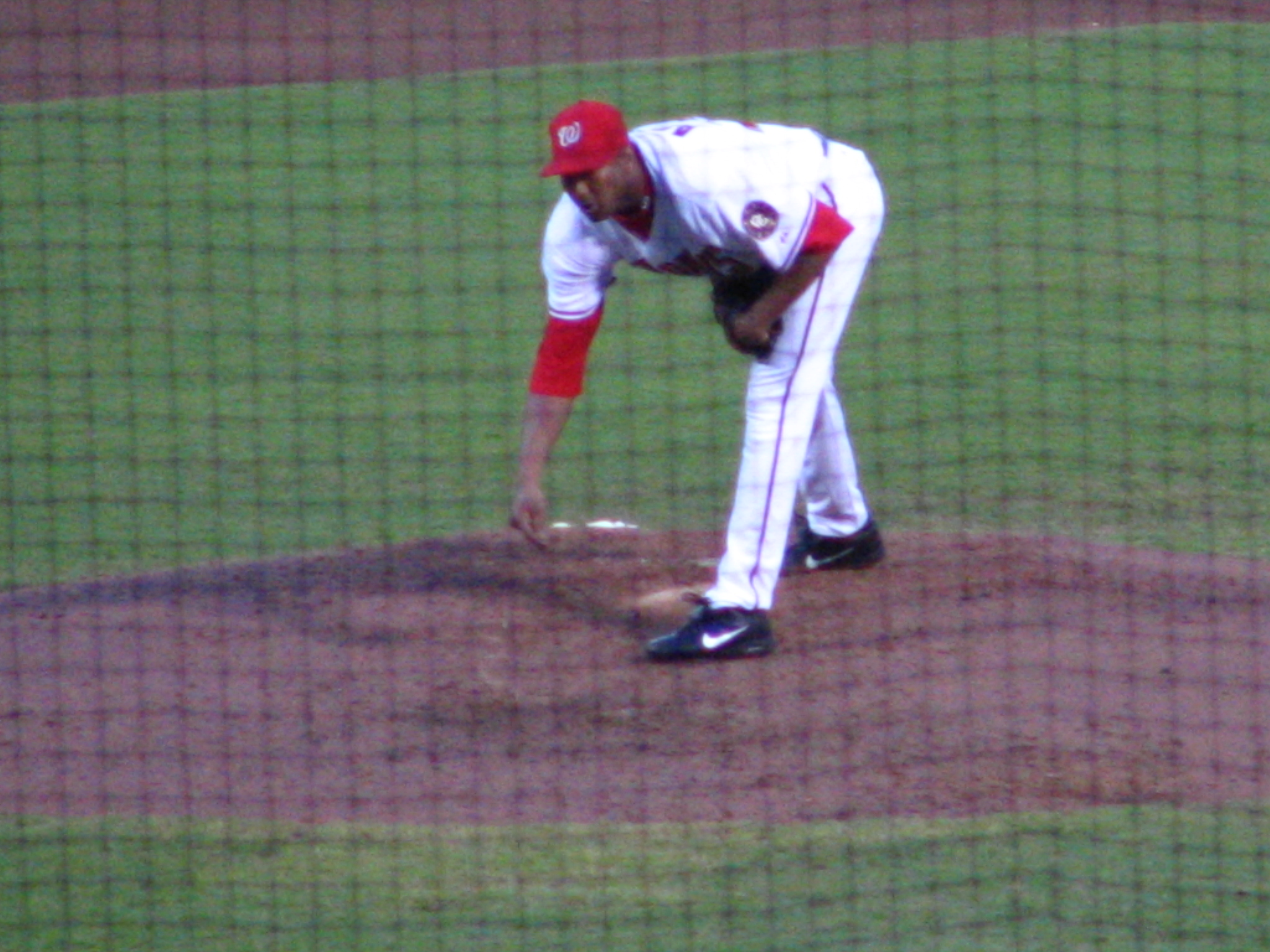
- Astacio in 2006
- Pitcher
- Born: November 28, 1968 (age 57); Hato Mayor del Rey, Dominican Republic
- Batted: Right Threw: Right

MLB debut
- July 3, 1992, for the Los Angeles Dodgers

Last MLB appearance
- September 27, 2006, for the Washington Nationals

MLB statistics
- Win–loss record: 129–124
- Earned run average: 4.67
- Strikeouts: 1,664
- Stats at Baseball Reference

Teams
- Los Angeles Dodgers (1992–1997); Colorado Rockies (1997–2001); Houston Astros (2001); New York Mets (2002–2003); Boston Red Sox (2004); Texas Rangers (2005); San Diego Padres (2005); Washington Nationals (2006)

Pedro Julio Astacio (born November 28, 1968) is a Dominican former Major League Baseball (MLB) pitcher. He has played for the Los Angeles Dodgers (1992–1997), Colorado Rockies (1997–2001), Houston Astros (2001), New York Mets (2002–2003), Boston Red Sox (2004), Texas Rangers (2005), the San Diego Padres (2005) and the Washington Nationals (2006). In 2007, Astacio signed a contract with the Nationals' Triple-A affiliate, the Columbus Clippers, but they released him in May.

== Biography ==
Astacio made national news when he tossed a shutout and fanned 10 in his major-league debut. Through 2021, he was the last pitcher to do this on his debut, and the first since Luis Tiant in 1964.

He proceeded to record four shutouts in just 11 starts as a midseason call-up for the Los Angeles Dodgers in 1992. Since 1992, no pitcher has had four shutouts in his rookie season.

Astacio held the record for the most career strikeouts by a member of the Colorado Rockies for nearly 10 years, recording 749 strikeouts between 1997 and 2001. The record was broken by Ubaldo Jimenez in 2011. As of the 2026 season, he stands sixth on the Rockies' career strikeout list behind German Marquez, Kyle Freeland, Jorge de la Rosa, Jon Gray, and Ubaldo Jimenez.

He was also a member of the 2004 Boston Red Sox team that won the team's first World Series since 1918, although he did not play in the 2004 postseason.

== See also ==
- List of Colorado Rockies team records
- List of Major League Baseball career hit batsmen leaders

== Sources ==
- Center, Bill, "Padres, Astacio at odds", Union-Tribune, December 20, 2005. accessed December 26, 2006.
