= Eric Young Sr. =

American baseball player & coach (born 1967)

Eric Young
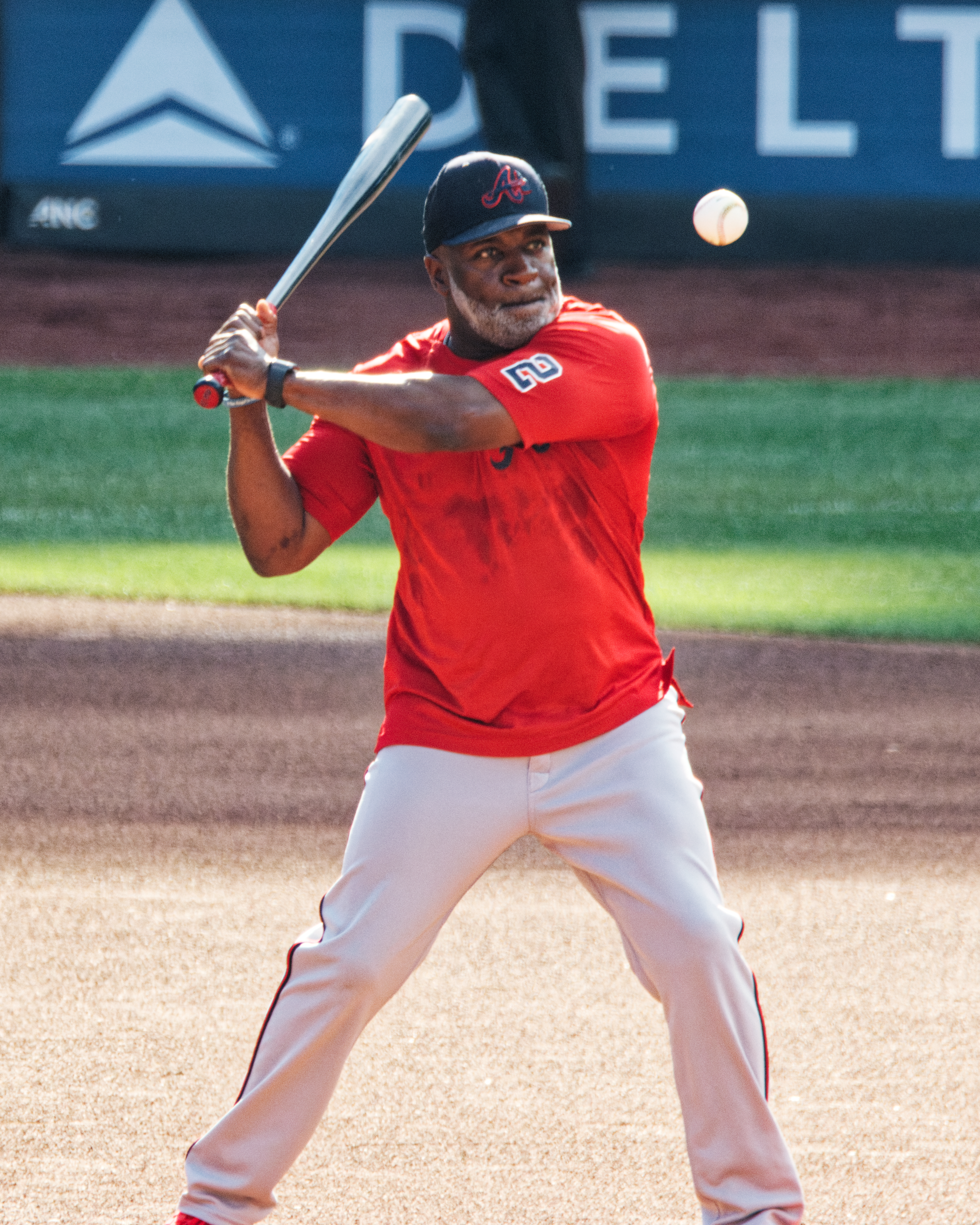
- Young with the Braves in 2022

Los Angeles Queens
- Second baseman
- Born: May 18, 1967 (age 59); New Brunswick, New Jersey, U.S.
- Batted: Right Threw: Right

MLB debut
- July 30, 1992, for the Los Angeles Dodgers

Last MLB appearance
- September 19, 2006, for the Texas Rangers

MLB statistics
- Batting average: .283
- Home runs: 79
- Runs batted in: 543
- Stolen bases: 465
- Stats at Baseball Reference

Teams
- As player: Los Angeles Dodgers (1992); Colorado Rockies (1993–1997); Los Angeles Dodgers (1997–1999); Chicago Cubs (2000–2001); Milwaukee Brewers (2002–2003); San Francisco Giants (2003); Texas Rangers (2004); San Diego Padres (2005–2006); Texas Rangers (2006); As coach: Arizona Diamondbacks (2010–2012); Colorado Rockies (2014–2016); Atlanta Braves (2018–2023); Los Angeles Angels (2024–2025)

Career highlights and awards
- All-Star (1996); World Series champion (2021); Silver Slugger Award (1996); NL stolen base leader (1996)

Eric Orlando Young Sr. (born May 18, 1967) is an American former professional baseball second baseman and left fielder, who played in Major League Baseball (MLB) for the Los Angeles Dodgers, Colorado Rockies, Chicago Cubs, Milwaukee Brewers, San Francisco Giants, Texas Rangers, and San Diego Padres. He is currently the manager of the Los Angeles Queens of the Women's Pro Baseball League (WPBL). He previously served as the first base coach for the Atlanta Braves. He played college baseball and college football for Rutgers University.

Raised in New Brunswick, New Jersey, Young attended New Brunswick High School, where he played basketball and football, in addition to baseball.

== Baseball career ==
=== 1990s ===
Young began his MLB career with the Los Angeles Dodgers in 1992, but soon became one of the original Colorado Rockies in 1993. He hit a home run in the Rockies' first-ever home at bat on April 9, 1993, as part of an 11-4 home win over the Montreal Expos. He helped Colorado to its first postseason series appearance in 1995, which they lost to the Atlanta Braves, three games to one. His best seasons came with the Rockies, where he was an All-Star and a Silver Slugger Award winner in 1996 at second base. In 1996, he hit .324, with 8 home runs, 74 RBI and 53 stolen bases.

During the 1990s, Young was one of the top base stealers in the major leagues. He is the Rockies career leader in stolen bases and is in the top 10 in many other offensive categories. On June 30, 1996, he managed to steal second base, third base, and home plate in one inning in a game against the Los Angeles Dodgers. In 1997, fan favorite Young was traded back to Los Angeles for pitcher Pedro Astacio. While in Los Angeles during 1998–1999, Young continued his consistency by stealing bases and hitting for solid averages.

=== 2000s ===
Young was traded by the Dodgers to the Chicago Cubs in 1999. In 2000, while a member of the Cubs, he hit .297, with 6 home runs, 98 runs and 54 steals. In 2001, he enjoyed a similar season. In January 2002, Young signed as a free agent with the Milwaukee Brewers. In 2003, he hit 15 home runs, a career-high that almost doubled his previous best of 8 home runs. Young went on to play with the Texas Rangers and the San Diego Padres, where he was mainly used as a pinch runner. On August 1, 2006, Young was released by the Padres. He was subsequently reacquired by the Rangers and joined the team later that month. In late October, he declared free agency, but did not end up playing in the Majors again. Young officially retired as a member of the Colorado Rockies on September 12, 2008. He was honored during a pregame ceremony that same day at Coors Field before the Rockies took on the Los Angeles Dodgers.

== Post-playing career ==
In 2008, Young was an analyst on the sports program Baseball Tonight.

Young served as a running instructor for the Houston Astros and helped with their outfield and base running. He was named the Arizona Diamondbacks first base coach on October 17, 2010. On October 17, 2012, Young was fired from the position. He joined the Colorado Rockies as the first base coach for the 2014 season. He was fired after the 2016 season. He was hired to be the first base coach of the Atlanta Braves for the 2018 season. Young opted out of traveling with the Braves during the 2020 season, due to the COVID-19 pandemic. On November 12, 2023, Young confirmed that he would be leaving the Braves to join the Los Angeles Angels coaching staff as their new third base coach under newly appointed manager Ron Washington. He was later moved to first base in 2025 before exiting the organization after the hiring of Perry Minasian as manager. Young was then hired as the manager of the Los Angeles Queens in the inaugural 2026 season of the Women's Pro Baseball League.

== Personal life ==
As a high school student, Young welcomed his oldest son and namesake, Eric Young Jr., with high-school sweetheart Paula Robinson. Eric Jr. followed him into professional baseball and made his major league debut with the Colorado Rockies on August 25, 2009 and is now the first base coach for the Seattle Mariners. On December 10, 2005, he married Beyonka Jackson and they welcomed their son Dallas Dupree Young, who is an actor.

== See also ==
- List of Colorado Rockies team records
- List of Major League Baseball annual stolen base leaders
- List of Major League Baseball annual triples leaders
- List of Major League Baseball career stolen bases leaders

| Preceded by Matt Williams | Arizona Diamondbacks First Base Coach; 2011–2012 | Succeeded by Steve Sax |
