= List of Colorado Rockies team records =

These are lists of Colorado Rockies records from their inception in 1993 until the 2025 season.

== Single season records ==
=== Batting ===
- Games: Vinny Castilla, 162 (1998), Neifi Pérez, 162 (1998), Neifi Pérez, 162 (2000)
- Batting Average: Larry Walker, .379 (1999)
- On-base percentage: Todd Helton, .469 (2004)
- Slugging Percentage: Larry Walker, .720 (1997)
- OPS: Larry Walker, 1.172 (1997)
- At Bats: Neifi Pérez, 690 (1999)
- Runs: Larry Walker, 143 (1997)
- Hits: Dante Bichette, 219 (1998)
- Total Bases: Larry Walker, 409 (1997)
- Doubles: Todd Helton, 59 (2000)
- Triples: Dexter Fowler, 15 (2011)
- Home Runs: Larry Walker, 49 (1997), Todd Helton, 49 (2001)
- RBI: Andrés Galarraga, 150 (1996)
- Walks: Todd Helton, 127 (2004)
- Strikeouts: Ezequiel Tovar, 200 (2024)
- Stolen Bases: Willy Taveras, 68 (2008)
- Singles: Juan Pierre, 163 (2001)
- Runs Created: Todd Helton, 192 (2000)
- Extra-Base Hits: Todd Helton, 105 (2001)
- Times on Base: Todd Helton, 323 (2000)
- Hit by Pitch: Eric Young, 21 (1996)
- Sacrifice Hits: Royce Clayton, 24 (2004)
- Sacrifice Flies: Jeff Cirillo, 12 (2000)
- At Bats per Strikeout: Juan Pierre, 21.3 (2001)
- At Bats per Home Run: Larry Walker, 11.6 (1997)

=== Pitching ===
- Earned Run Average: Kyle Freeland, 2.85 (2018)
- Won-Loss percentage: Jorge de la Rosa, .727 (2013)
- WHIP: Ubaldo Jiménez, 1.12 (2010)
- Hits Allowed per 9 innings pitched: Ubaldo Jiménez, 6.66 (2010)
- Walks Allowed per 9 innings pitched: Aaron Cook, 2.04 (2008)
- Strikeouts per 9 innings pitched: Germán Márquez, 10.5 (2018)
- Games: Matt Belisle, 80 (2012)
- Saves: Wade Davis, 43 (2018)
- Innings: Pedro Astacio, 232 (1999)
- Strikeouts: Germán Márquez, 230 (2018)
- Complete Games: Pedro Astacio, 7 (1999)

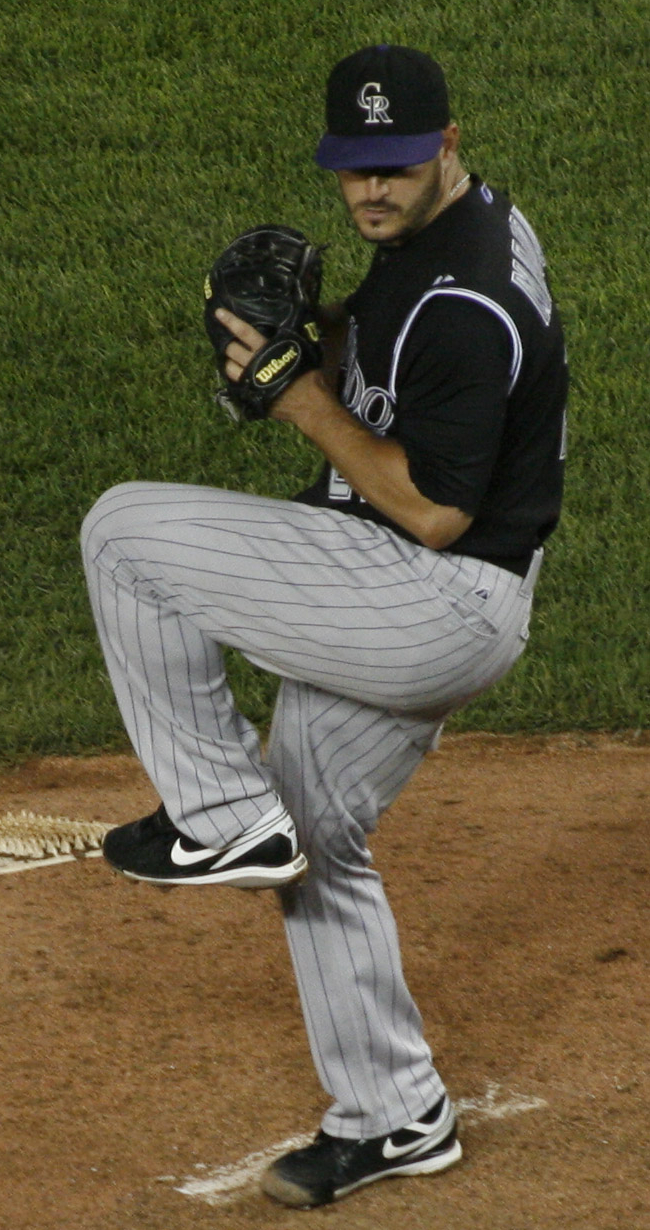
Jason Marquis

- Shutouts: Roger Bailey, 2 (1997), Jason Marquis, 2 (2009), Ubaldo Jiménez, 2 (2010)
- Home Runs Allowed: Pedro Astacio, 39 (1998)
- Walks Allowed: Darryl Kile, 109 (1999)
- Hits Allowed: Pedro Astacio, 258 (1999)
- Strikeout to Walk: Germán Márquez, 4.04 (2018)
- Wins: Ubaldo Jiménez, 19 (2010)
- Losses: Darryl Kile, 17 (1998) Kyle Freeland, 17 (2025)
- Earned Runs Allowed: Pedro Astacio, 145 (1998)
- Hit Batsmen: Pedro Astacio, 17 (1998)
- Batters Faced: Darryl Kile, 1,020 (1998)
- Games Finished: José Jiménez, 69 (2002)

=== Fielding Records ===
- Most Putouts: Andrés Galarraga, 1,528 (1996)
- Most Assists: Troy Tulowitzki, 561 (2007)
- Highest fielding percentage by an infielder: Todd Helton, .999 (2001)
- Highest fielding percentage by an outfielder: Charlie Blackmon, 1.000 (2020)
- Highest fielding percentage by a catcher: Chris Iannetta, 1.000 (2008)
- Most Errors: Walt Weiss, 30 (1996)

== Career records ==
=== Batting ===
- Batting Average: Larry Walker, .334
- On-base percentage: Larry Walker, .426
- Slugging Percentage: Larry Walker, .618
- OPS: Larry Walker, 1.044
- Games: Todd Helton, 2,247
- At Bats: Todd Helton, 7,962
- Runs: Todd Helton, 1,401
- Hits: Todd Helton, 2,519
- Total Bases: Todd Helton, 4,292
- Doubles: Todd Helton, 592
- Triples: Charlie Blackmon, 68
- Home Runs: Todd Helton, 369
- RBI: Todd Helton, 1,406
- Walks: Todd Helton, 1,335
- Strikeouts: Todd Helton, 1,175
- Stolen Bases: Eric Young, 180
- Singles: Todd Helton, 1,879
- Runs Created: Todd Helton, 1,759
- Extra-Base Hits: Todd Helton, 998
- Total Plate Appearances: Todd Helton, 9,453
- Times on Base: Todd Helton, 3,675
- Hit by Pitch: Charlie Blackmon, 110
- Sacrifice Flies: Todd Helton, 93
- Sacrifice Hits: Aaron Cook, 67
- Intentional Walks: Todd Helton, 185
- Grounded into Double Plays: Todd Helton, 186
- At Bats per Strikeout: Juan Pierre, 14.7
- At Bats per Home Run: Andrés Galarraga, 15.5

=== Pitching ===
- Earned Run Average: Brian Fuentes, 3.38
- Wins: Jorge de la Rosa, 86
- Win–loss percentage: Scott Oberg, .692 (minimum 25 decisions), Curt Leskanic, .608 (minimum 50 decisions)
- WHIP: Brian Fuentes, 1.24 (reliever, minimum 300 innings pitched), Ubaldo Jiménez, 1.28 (minimum 750 innings pitched)
- Hits Allowed per 9 innings pitched: Ubaldo Jiménez, 7.47
- Walks Allowed per 9 innings pitched: Austin Gomber, 2.59
- Strikeouts per 9 innings pitched: Jon Gray, 9.21
- Games: Steve Reed, 461
- Saves: Brian Fuentes, 115
- Innings: Aaron Cook, 1312 1/3
- Strikeouts: German Marquez, 1,069
- Games Started: Kyle Freeland, 231
- Complete Games: Pedro Astacio, 14
- Shutouts: Jason Jennings and Ubaldo Jiménez, 3
- Home Runs Allowed: Kyle Freeland, 180
- Walks Allowed: Jorge de la Rosa, 481
- Hits Allowed: Aaron Cook, 1,519
- Strikeout-to-Walk ratio: Jon Gray, 3.03
- Losses: Kyle Freeland, 90
- Earned Runs Allowed: Aaron Cook, 660
- Wild Pitches: Ubaldo Jiménez, 49
- Hit Batsmen: Pedro Astacio, 58
- Batters Faced: Aaron Cook, 5,630
- Games Finished: Brian Fuentes, 243

== Team records ==
- Games: 163 (2007), 163 (2018)
- Wins: 92 (2009)
- Losses: 119 (2025)
- Highest Winning Percentage: .568 (2009)
- Lowest Winning Percentage: .265 (2025)

=== Batting records ===
- Batting Average: .294 (2000)
- Hits: 1,664 (2000)
- Runs: 968 (2000)
- Singles: 1,130 (2000)
- Doubles: 333 (1998)
- Triples: 61 (2001)
- Stolen Bases: 201 (1996)
- Home Runs: 239 (1997)
- Grand Slams: 5 (1994), 5 (1998), 5 (2000), 5 (2002)
- Pinch-Homers: 11 (1995), 11 (2004)
- RBI: 909 (1996)
- Total Bases: 2,748 (2001)
- Extra-Base Hits: 598 (2001)
- Slugging Percent: .483 (2001)
- On-Base Percent: .362 (2000)
- Hit by Pitch: 82 (1996)
- Left On Base: 1,198 (2000)
- Walks: 660 (2009)
- Intentional Bases on Balls: 64 (2000)
- Most Strikeouts: 1,617 (2024)

=== Pitching records ===
- Saves: 51 (2018)
- Fewest Saves 16 (2020, 60-game season), 26 (2001)
- Most Blown Saves 34 (2001)
- Complete Games: 12 (1999)
- Most Runs Allowed: 1,028 (1999)
- Fewest Runs Allowed: 353 (2020, 60-game season) 638 (1994, 117-game season), 715 (2009, 162-game season)
- Most Earned Runs Allowed: 955 (1999)
- Fewest Earned Runs Allowed: 327 (2020, 60-game season), 590 (1994, 117-game season), 663 (2010, 162-game season)
- Most Hits Allowed: 1,700 (1999)
- Most Walks Allowed: 737 (1999)
- Most Strikeouts: 1,409 (2018)
- Most Shutouts: 12 (2010)
- Lowest ERA: 4.14 (2010)
- Most Wild Pitches: 82 (1993)
- Most Home Runs Allowed: 239 (2001)
- Fewest Home Runs Allowed: 83 (2020, 60-game season), 120 (1994, 117-game season), 136 (2013, 162-game season)
- Most Hit Batters: 86 (2023)
- Most Balks: 22 (1993)
- Most Pickoffs: 28 (1993)

=== Fielding records ===
- Highest Fielding Percent: .98925 (2007, MLB Record)
- Most Assists: 1,946 (1997)
- Most Errors: 167 (1993)
- Fewest Errors: 42 (2020, 60-game season), 68 (2007)
- Most Double Plays: 202 (1997)
- Most Passed Balls: 22 (2012)
- Most Consecutive Games with at least One Error: 9 (June 18–27, 1996)
- Most Consecutive Errorless Games: 13 (June 12–24, 1998)
