= Aaron Cook (baseball) =

American baseball player (born 1979)

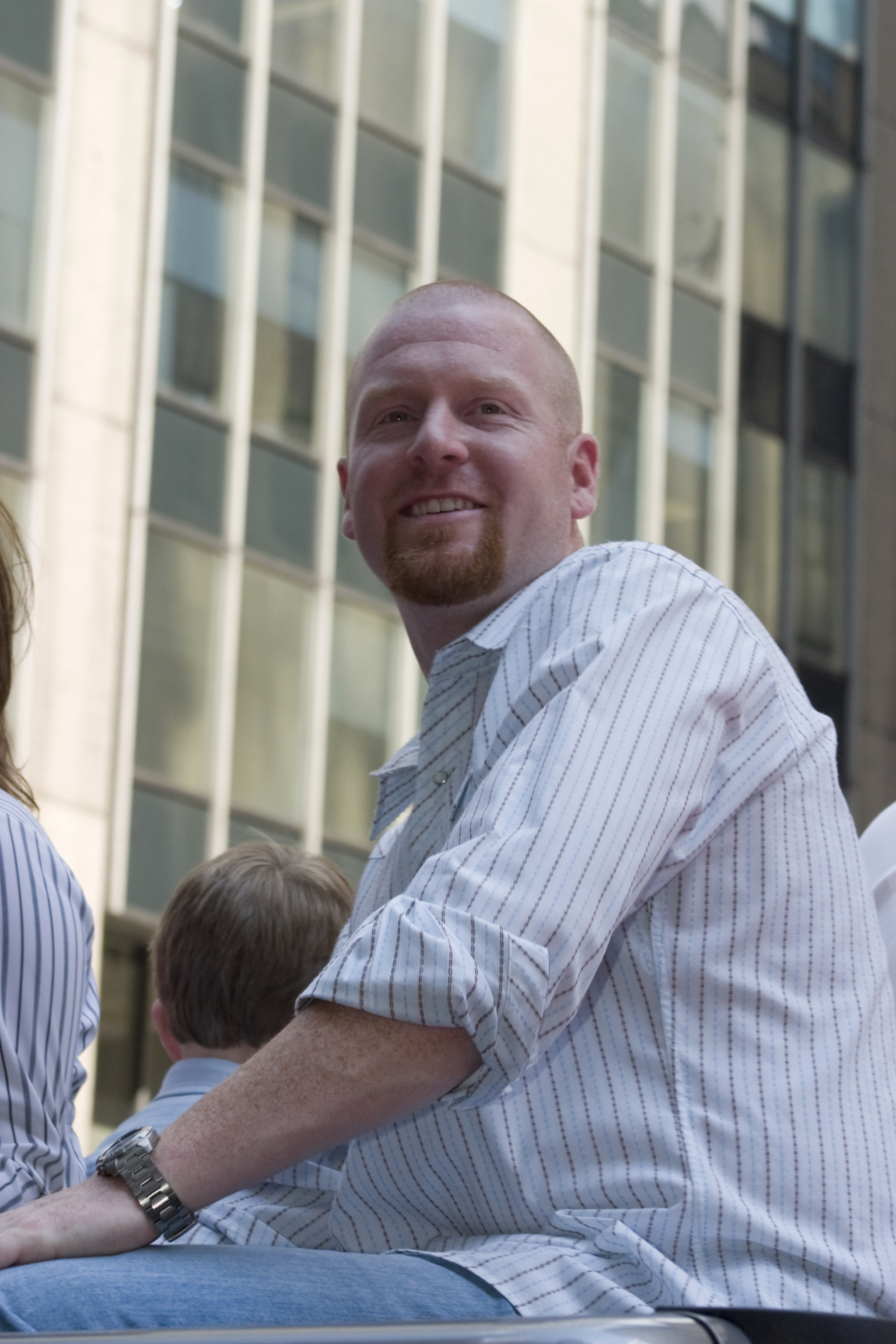
- Pitcher
- Born: February 8, 1979 (age 47); Fort Campbell, Kentucky, U.S.
- Batted: Right Threw: Right

MLB debut
- August 10, 2002, for the Colorado Rockies

Last MLB appearance
- September 28, 2012, for the Boston Red Sox

MLB statistics
- Win–loss record: 76–79
- Earned run average: 4.60
- Strikeouts: 578
- Stats at Baseball Reference

Teams
- Colorado Rockies (2002–2011); Boston Red Sox (2012)

Career highlights and awards
- All-Star (2008)

Aaron Lane Cook (born February 8, 1979) is an American former professional baseball pitcher. He played in Major League Baseball (MLB) for the Colorado Rockies and Boston Red Sox. He won the Tony Conigliaro Award in 2005 and was an All-Star in 2008 with the Rockies.

== High school ==
In high school, while playing for Hamilton High School in Hamilton, Ohio, Cook allowed only one home run, to fellow future major leaguer Kevin Youkilis, who was playing for Sycamore High School in suburban Cincinnati.

== Colorado Rockies ==
Cook was drafted by the Colorado Rockies in the second round of the 1997 MLB draft and made his major league debut in 2002.

=== 2002–2003: MLB debut and demotion ===
Cook made his major league debut on August 10, 2002, against the Chicago Cubs, pitching two innings and allowing a home run. He made his first start on August 26 against the San Francisco Giants, pitching six innings while allowing 3 runs and 13 base runners in a no decision. Cook finished the season appearing in nine games (five starts) in the majors with a 4.54 ERA in 35 innings.

Cook made the 2003 opening day roster after pitching a solid spring training and was named the Rockies' #2 starter, beginning his season against the Houston Astros.

After posting an ERA of over 5.00 through 14 starts, Cook was demoted to Triple-A, replaced by Denny Neagle, who had finished a rehabilitation assignment. Cook returned to the majors in July, mostly pitching as a reliever. Cook finished his rookie season 4–6 with a 6.02 ERA in 124 innings. His 57 walks allowed topped his 43 strikeouts.

=== 2004–2005: injury and recovery ===
Cook's 2004 season came to an abrupt end when he suffered a pulmonary embolism in his throwing shoulder. During an August 7 start against the Cincinnati Reds, he complained of dizziness and shortness of breath. After he was taken to a hospital, doctors discovered blood clots had formed in his right shoulder and spread to his lungs. On September 10, Cook underwent extensive surgery at a St. Louis hospital, during which the first rib on his right side was removed to relieve compression on a major blood vein. The injury ended his season, finishing with a 6–4 record in 16 starts.

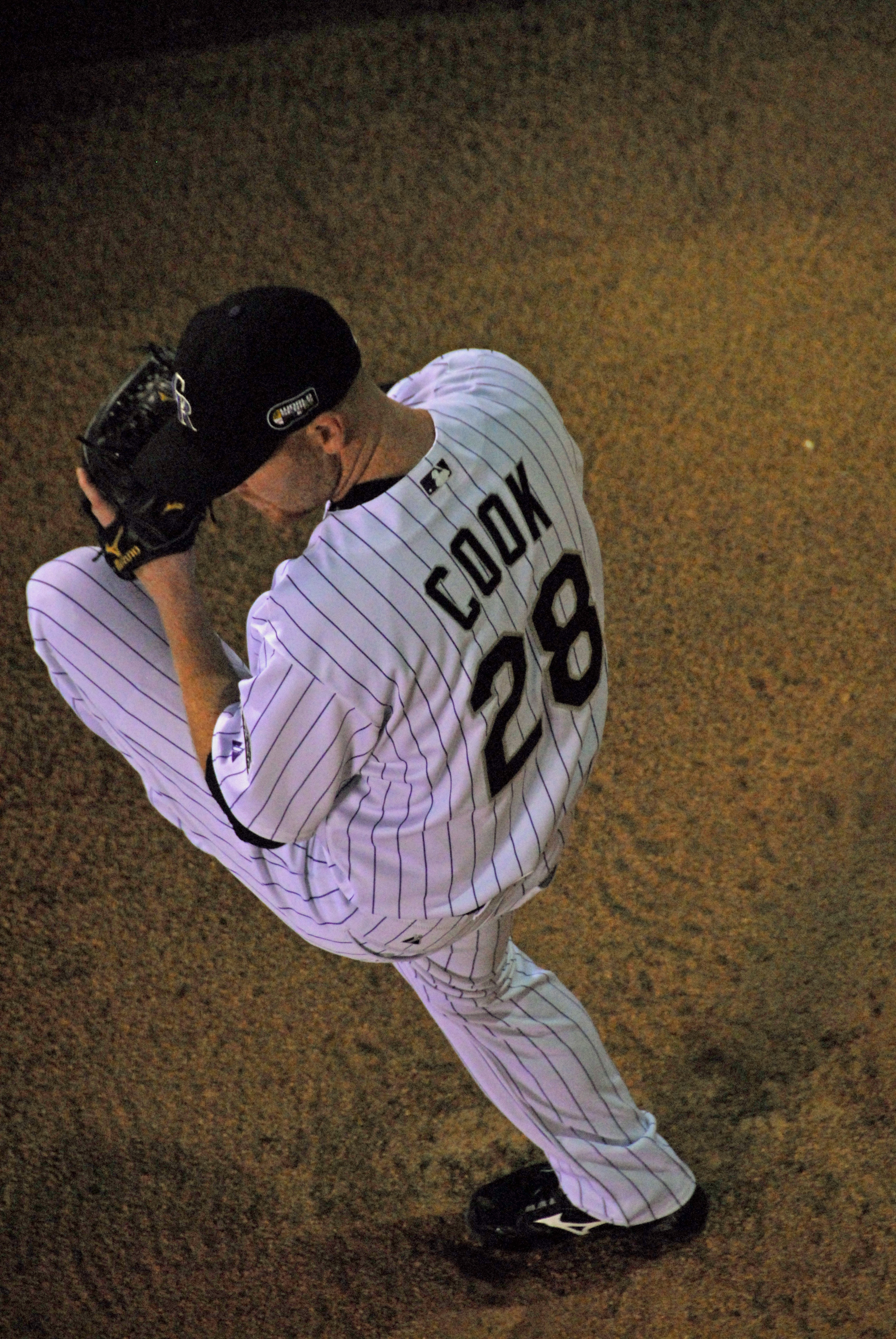
Cook winds up

Cook returned from the disabled list on July 30, 2005, when he gave up seven runs and 11 hits in 4 1/3 innings of a 9–2 loss to the Philadelphia Phillies at Coors Field. His first 2005 victory came in an 11–2 decision over the Milwaukee Brewers on August 15, when he pitched six innings and gave up two runs and nine hits. In his final 12 starts of 2005, Cook went 7–1 with a 3.07 ERA. For this outstanding recovery from his injury, he was awarded the 2005 Tony Conigliaro Award.

=== 2006 season ===
After battling injuries and inconsistency during his first three years, Cook stayed in the rotation throughout the 2006 season, with an ERA of 4.23 in 32 starts and a 9–15 record and 92 strikeouts in a career-high 212 2/3 innings.

Despite pitching half his games at hitter-friendly Coors Field, Cook's ERA was higher on the road (4.62) than at home (3.96).

=== 2007: World Series start ===
Cook was the Rockies opening day starter in 2007. On June 28, he allowed Craig Biggio's 3,000th hit in Minute Maid Park.

Cook missed nearly two months with a strained side muscle starting in August, aggravating the injury in early September. He missed the first two rounds of the playoffs, throwing a simulated game for the Rockies after they won the National League (NL) pennant. Cook returned, starting Game 4 of the World Series against the Boston Red Sox, pitching six innings while allowing three runs and having two strikeouts. The Rockies lost the game 4–3, sealing a series sweep.

Cook finished the season with an 8–7 record in 25 starts. After the season, $4.5 million next year under an option the Rockies exercised and Cook signed a three-year contract extension worth a guaranteed $30 million and a team option for the 2012 season.

=== 2008: All-Star ===
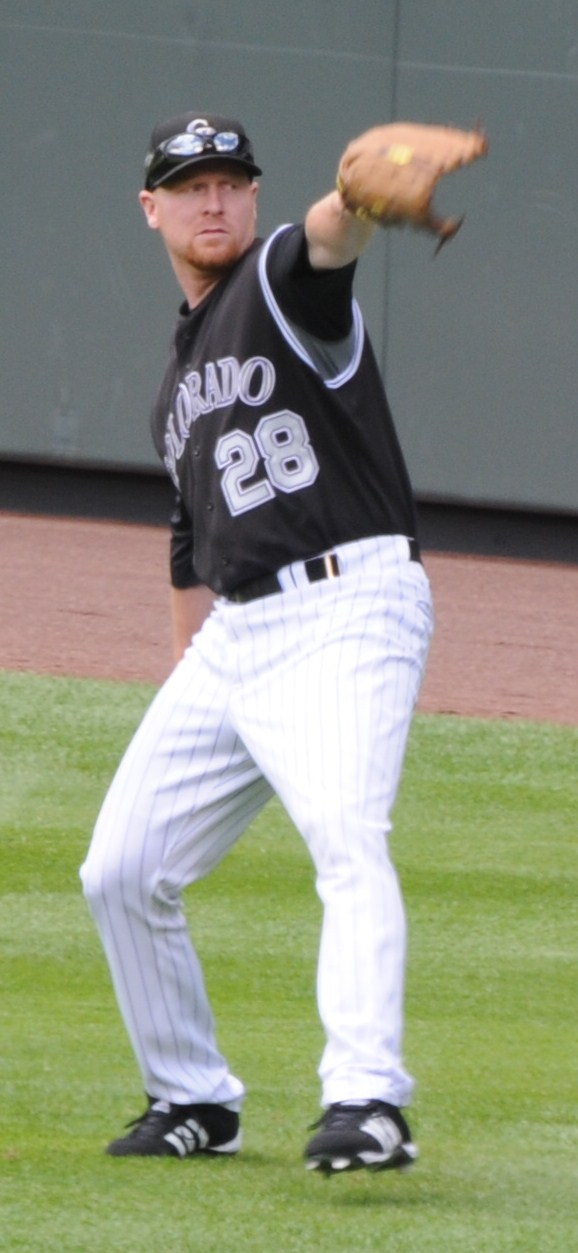
Cook, with the Rockies, warming up before a game in 2008

Cook began 2008 winning six consecutive starts from April 13 to May 9. On July 6, Cook was selected for the MLB All-Star Game, his only career All-Star appearance. He pitched three scoreless innings in the All-Star Game, including escaping a no-out, bases loaded jam after two errors and an intentional walk, avoiding the loss. Cook was considered a potential All-Star Game MVP, had the NL won the game.

On July 1, Cook threw a complete-game shutout against the San Diego Padres, hurling just 79 pitches.

Cook finished the season with a career-high 16 wins and 96 strikeouts. He gave up 20 hits on 0–2 counts, more than any other pitcher in baseball. He also led the NL in hits allowed, with 236.

=== 2009 season ===
Cook began his follow-up to his All-Star season strong, with a 10–6 record through late August, when a shoulder injury caused him a month. He returned for two starts, including pitching eight innings in a win over Milwaukee on October 1 to clinch Colorado's return to the postseason. At the plate, Cook walked three times in that game, twice with the bases loaded.

Cook started Game 2 of the NL Division Series against the Phillies, pitching five innings and allowing three runs in a 5–4 victory. The Rockies lost the next two games and the series.

=== 2010–2011: more injuries ===
Cook's 2010 season was filled with inconsistency and injuries, as he twice wound up on the DL. First, in August, Cook landed on the 15‑day disabled list with a sprained toe.

Cook came back in September; after pitching in just his second start off the disabled list, Cook suffered a non-displaced fracture in his leg, ending his season. He finished with a 6–8 record and 5.08 ERA in 23 starts.

Cook's 2011 season started late, as he broke his ring finger on his throwing hand in spring training while also nursing a sore elbow. He debuted in June and put up some of the worst results of his career as injuries cut short his season for the third straight time. He finished with a 3–10 record and a 6.03 ERA in 18 games (17 starts). After the season, the Rockies declined Cook's $11 million option.

Cook ended his 10-year tenure with the Rockies leading the franchise in wins, losses, and starts. He is still the team's leader in innings pitched and earned runs allowed and is in the top 10 in other categories, as of 2025.

== Boston Red Sox ==
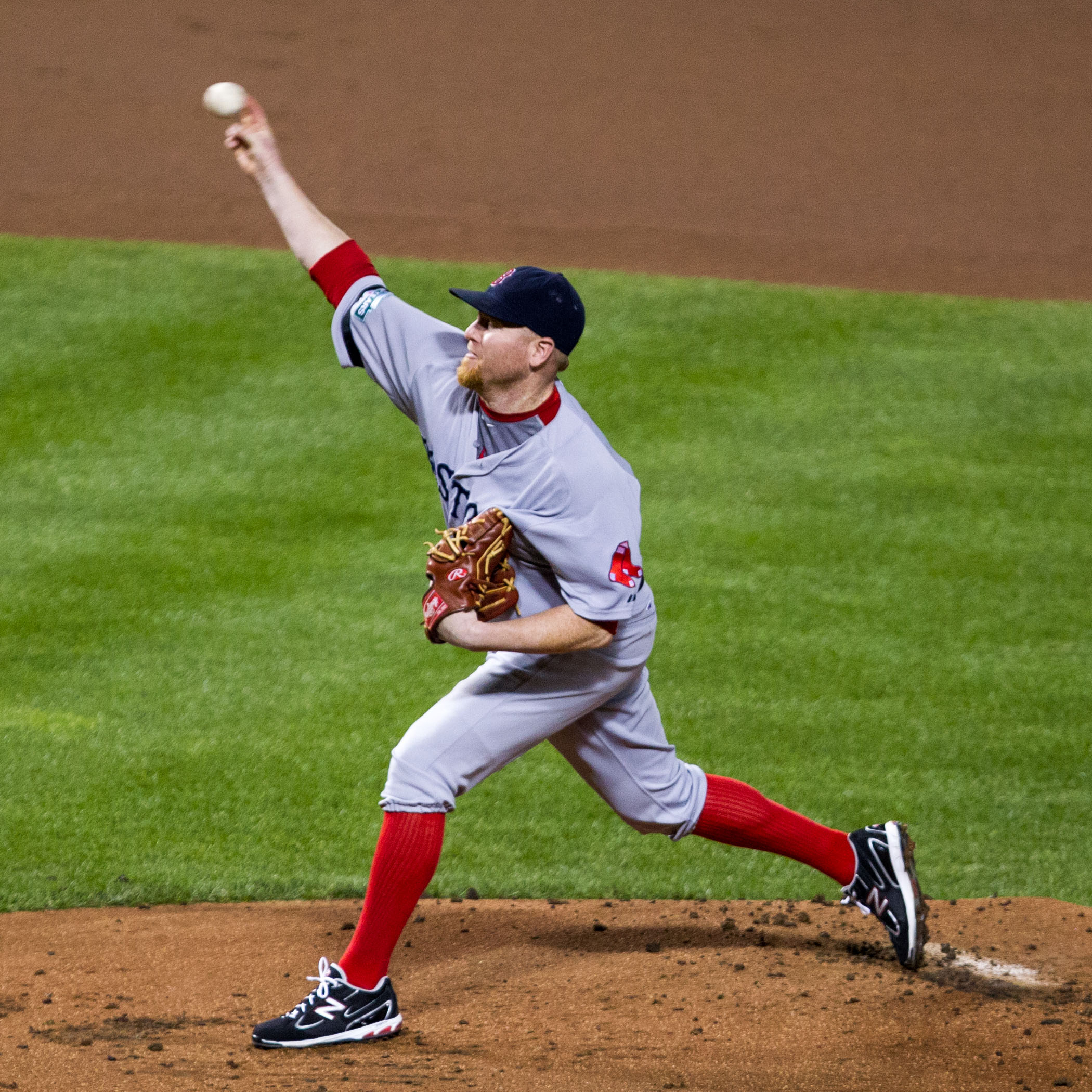
Cook with the Red Sox on September 28, 2012

On January 14, 2012, Cook signed a minor league deal with the Boston Red Sox that included an opt-out clause if he did not make the Red Sox by May 1. Cook was recovering from shoulder and knee injuries that plagued him in 2010 and 2011. In five games with Triple-A Pawtucket, he went 3–0 with two complete games. On May 1, the day he chose to exercise his opt-out clause, Boston promoted him to start in place of the injured Josh Beckett. Cook received a prorated salary of $1.5 million plus incentives. He also had a second opt-out clause for June 1.

On May 5, Cook made his Red Sox debut against the Baltimore Orioles. He pitched only 2 2/3 innings, as a result of an injured knee off the spikes of Orioles first baseman Chris Davis. After getting treatment in the clubhouse, Cook returned, only to then allow a two-run home run to Adam Jones. He was placed on the disabled list the next day. He returned on June 24.

On June 29, against the Seattle Mariners, Cook threw a complete-game shutout, allowing just two hits and no walks over 81 pitches.

Cook struggled for the rest of the season, finishing with a 4–11 record and a 5.65 ERA. It was his third consecutive season with an ERA over 5.00, following five seasons with a sub-4.25 ERA. He also had 1.9 strikeouts per 9 innings, the lowest of any starter with at least 85 innings in the majors. He tied for the American League lead with 5 errors as a pitcher.

== Later career: return to the Rockies ==
On January 16, 2013, Cook signed a minor league deal with an invitation to spring training with the Phillies. Philadelphia released him on March 26, as he did not make the big league roster.

On March 29, Cook re-signed with the Rockies. He played with the Colorado Springs Sky Sox, the Rockies' Triple-A affiliate. After posting a 0–5 record with an 8.15 ERA, Cook told the team on July 19 that he would not pitch for them again in 2013 and was released. It was later revealed Cook had severe inflammation in his elbow and decided to end his season.

In January 2014, Cook expressed a desire to return to pitching. He later decided to take time to recover from an elbow injury and return in 2015, but he did not sign with another team.

== Pitching style ==
Cook was a sinkerballer. He relied on a heavy sinker, which he threw more than 70% of the time and induced ground balls at an average 64% of the time. His sinker was considered by many hitters like trying to hit an anvil falling, as it bottomed out at the end. His response to his style of pitching had always been: "I'm a pitch to contact guy, I may not be a flashy pitcher because I don't get the K's. I work quick and I make hitters make contact on my sinker and induce the ground ball". His repertoire also included a curveball, a changeup, and a cutter he added in 2010.

== Personal life ==
Cook is married and has three children. They live in Ardmore, Oklahoma and have 30 horses. It is his second marriage.

Cook was hospitalized in July 2018 after suffering delirium tremens after returning from a trip to the Bahamas. He said the incident was due to his alcohol use and that he subsequently has been sober.

== See also ==
- List of Colorado Rockies team records
