= Kyle Freeland =

American baseball player (born 1993)

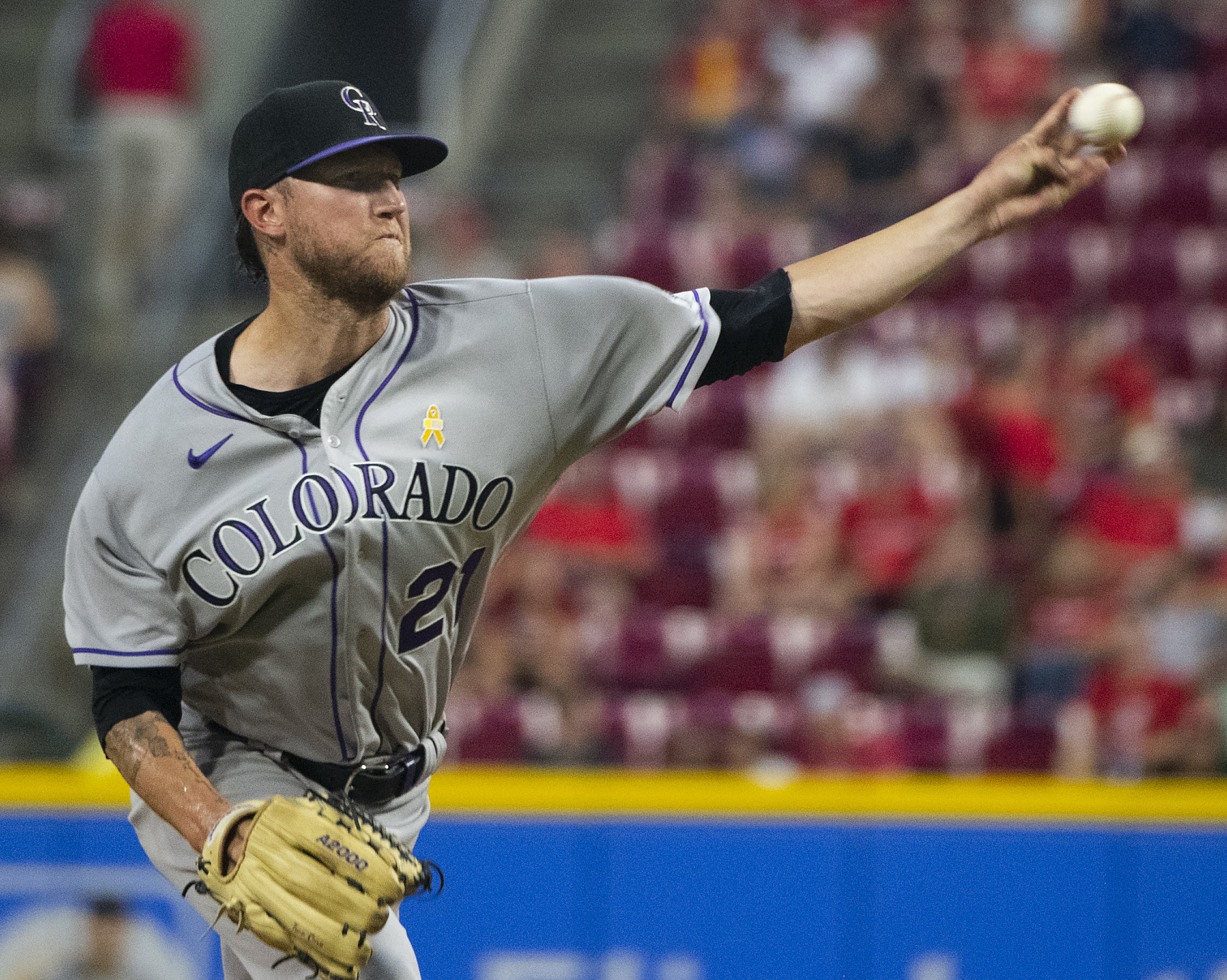
- Freeland with the Colorado Rockies in 2022

Free agent
- Pitcher
- Born: May 14, 1993 (age 33); Denver, Colorado, U.S.
- Bats: Left Throws: Left

MLB debut
- April 7, 2017, for the Colorado Rockies

MLB statistics (through 2026 season)
- Win–loss record: 69–102
- Earned run average: 4.75
- Strikeouts: 1,052
- Stats at Baseball Reference

Teams
- Colorado Rockies (2017–2026)
Medals
Men's baseball
Representing United States
World Baseball Classic
Silver medal – second place	2023 Miami	Team

Kyle Richard Freeland (born May 14, 1993) is an American professional baseball pitcher who is a free agent. He has played in Major League Baseball (MLB) for the Colorado Rockies. He played college baseball at Evansville and was drafted by the Rockies with the eighth pick in the first round of the 2014 MLB draft. He made his MLB debut in 2017.

== Amateur career ==
=== High school ===
Freeland attended Thomas Jefferson High School in Denver, Colorado. He lettered in baseball three years. In his senior season in 2011, he set a state record with 145 strikeouts, was named an all-state player, and had an 8–2 win–loss record, 1.39 ERA, and 17 walks in 65 innings.

=== College ===
The Philadelphia Phillies selected Freeland in the 35th round of the 2011 Major League Baseball draft. He did not sign and attended the University of Evansville, playing college baseball for the Evansville Purple Aces.

As a freshman in 2012, Freeland had a 4–5 record with a 4.55 earned run average (ERA) and 70 strikeouts in 91 innings across 14 games started. He threw two complete game shutouts. As a sophomore in 2013, he again started 14 games, going 4–8 with a 4.34 ERA and 84 strikeouts in 93 1/3 innings. That summer, he played in the Cape Cod League with the Hyannis Harbor Hawks, where he had a 2.25 ERA and a league-leading 48 strikeouts. He was named a league all-star. As a junior, he was 10–2 with a 1.90 ERA and 128 strikeouts over 99 2/3 innings, again starting 14 games. He was named a first-team All-American by Baseball America and Perfect Game.

== Professional career ==
=== Draft and minor leagues ===
Considered a top prospect for the 2014 Major League Baseball draft, the Colorado Rockies selected Freeland in the first round, with the eighth overall pick of the draft. Freeland debuted professionally that summer with the Grand Junction Rockies and was promoted in August to the Asheville Tourists. He started five games for both clubs, with a combined 3–0 record and a 1.15 ERA.

Freeland did not start pitching in 2015 until July, due to shoulder fatigue and surgery to remove bone chips in his elbow. He started twice for Grand Junction before advancing to the Modesto Nuts. He had a combined 4.05 ERA in seven starts. After the regular season, Freeland started six games for the Salt River Rafters of the Arizona Fall League, with a 2.84 ERA and just 13 strikeouts in 26 1/3 innings. In 2016, Freeland began the season with the Hartford Yard Goats and was promoted to the Albuquerque Isotopes in June. Freeland posted an 11–10 record with a 3.89 ERA between the two clubs, starting 26 games.

=== Major leagues ===
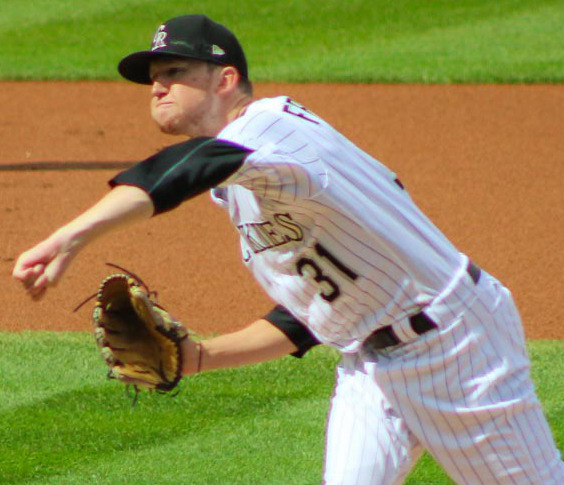
Freeland with the Rockies in 2017

==== 2017: Rookie of the Year consideration ====
Freeland made his major league debut with the Rockies on April 7, 2017, against the Los Angeles Dodgers and earned his first MLB win. He also had his first major league hit, a single. It was the first time in 51 years that a starting pitcher made his MLB debut in his team's home opener in the state where he was born. Chuck Dobson last did so for the Kansas City Athletics in 1966. Freeland hit his first major league home run on May 21, off Cincinnati Reds pitcher Bronson Arroyo. On July 9, Freeland took a no-hitter into the 9th inning against the Chicago White Sox before allowing a one-out a single to Melky Cabrera. He pitched five games in relief, the only relief appearances in the first 9 years of his career. He finished the season with an 11–11 record and 4.10 ERA in 156 innings, tying for the team lead in wins and hit batsmen with fellow rookie Germán Márquez. Both Rockies rookies received National League (NL) Rookie of the Year votes, with Freeland finishing seventh, two spots below Márquez.

==== 2018: Breakout and playoffs ====
Freeland had a career year in 2018. He broke Ubaldo Jimenez's single-season Rockies record with a 2.85 ERA and ended the year with a 17–7 record in 33 starts. He struggled badly in his first four starts, going 0–3 with a 5.85 ERA, but went 17–4 with a 2.52 ERA the rest of the season. Unlike most pitchers, Freeland excelled at the hitter-friendly Coors Field, setting the single-season Rockies record for home ERA at 2.40. He pitched 202 1/3 innings, striking out 173 batters against 70 walks and 182 hits and holding opponents to a .240 batting average. Additionally, 24 of his 33 starts were quality starts, including 11 consecutive quality starts from August 6 through the end of the season. Freeland finished fourth in Cy Young Award voting.

In his only postseason appearance, Freeland started the NL Wild Card Game. He pitched 6 2/3 scoreless innings, striking out six while allowing four singles and one walk as the Rockies defeated the Chicago Cubs 2–1 in 13 innings. Freeland also became the first Rockies pitcher to have a scoreless postseason start.

==== 2019–2021 ====
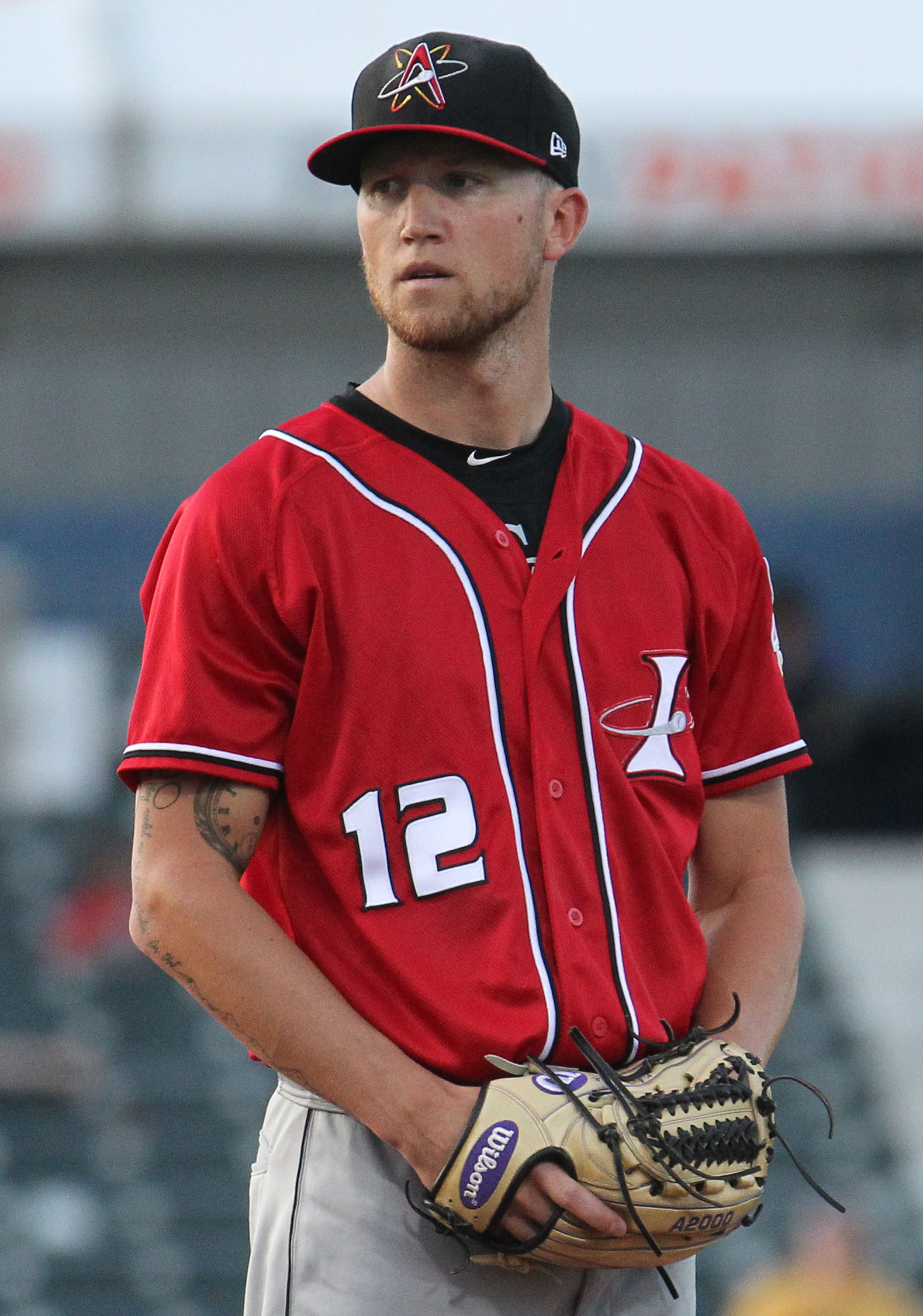
Freeland with the Isotopes in 2019

Freeland followed up his best season with one of his worst. He was the Rockies Opening Day starter, but went 2–6 with a 7.13 ERA through his first 12 starts before being demoted to Triple-A on May 31. He also missed a week with a blister on his finger. He returned to pitch for Colorado in July, but his performance was only slightly better, going 1–5 with a 6.20 ERA in 10 starts. He also missed a month with a left groin strain. He tied with Antonio Senzatela for the most losses on the team, which tied for the 10th most in the NL.

Freeland had a bounce-back season in 2020. He was one of the Rockies most dependable starters in the shortened 60-game season. Despite a poor final outing, in 13 starts, he went 2–3 with a 4.33 ERA, led the NL with 9 quality starts, and led all pitchers in inducing 15 double plays. His 2.0 strikeout-to-walk ratio was the lowest among NL qualified pitchers, but he finished 14th in wins above replacement among NL pitchers at 1.9, as calculated by Baseball Reference.

Freeland began the 2021 season on the injured list with a shoulder strain, missing the first month and a half of the season. He started slow, with two losses and 9.58 ERA after his first five starts, but ended the season with a 7–8 record and 4.33 ERA in 23 starts. He struck out 105 batters in 120 2/3 innings.

==== 2022–2025: extension and injuries ====
The Rockies named Freeland their starting pitcher for Opening Day in 2022. On April 19, Freeland agreed to a five-year, $64.5 million contract extension with the Rockies. On the year, Freeland went 9–11 with a 4.63 ERA in 31 starts covering 174 2/3 innings. Batters had a .342 on-base percentage against Freeland, the highest of any qualified pitcher. He led MLB with 9 sacrifice flies allowed and 8 triples allowed.

Freeland was 6–14 with a 5.03 ERA in 2023. While he had a losing record, he led the depleted Rockies rotation in ERA, innings pitched, starts, strikeouts, and home runs and hits allowed. His 29 home runs allowed were fourth-most in the NL.

Freeland was the Rockies' Opening Day starter for the third time in his career to begin 2024 but allowed 10 runs while getting only 8 outs in a blowout loss to the reigning NL champion Arizona Diamondbacks. He struggled to an 0–3 record and 13.21 ERA across his four starts, after which the Rockies placed him on the injured list with a left elbow strain on April 19. The team transferred him to the 60-day injured list on May 24. Freeland was activated on June 23. He was effective for the last-place Rockies in his return, going 5–5 with a 3.96 ERA in 17 starts from late June until the end the season.

In 2024, Freeland had the lowest walk rate of his career, walking only 5.3 percent of batters faced, which was in the top 10 percent of qualified pitchers. However, he ranked in the bottom 10 percent of many advanced metrics, including strikeout percentage, whiff percentage, and expected opponents' batting average and slugging percentage. Freeland led the majors with 17 losses in 2025, also getting five wins for the 119-loss Rockies. He again led the team in many pitching statistics, including innings pitched, starts, and strikeouts, and his 4.98 ERA was the lowest among starters.

==== 2026–present ====
On August 2, 2026, Freeland pitched his first career complete game in an 8–1 victory over the Kansas City Royals.

== International career ==
Freeland pitched for the United States in the 2023 World Baseball Classic. He pitched in two games, allowing 2 runs and striking out 5 batters in 6 innings, including a solo home run to Kazuma Okamoto in the championship game loss to Japan.

== Personal life ==
Freeland and his wife married in 2021. They live in Scottsdale, Arizona. He has an older brother. Their mother teaches at the Denver elementary school that Freeland attended.

Freeland lettered in golf four years in high school.

Freeland and his wife donated $3 million to the Evansville baseball program in 2024 for a new clubhouse. In January 2025, the Purple Aces retired Freeland's number 21.
