= Ubaldo Jiménez =

Dominican baseball player (born 1984)

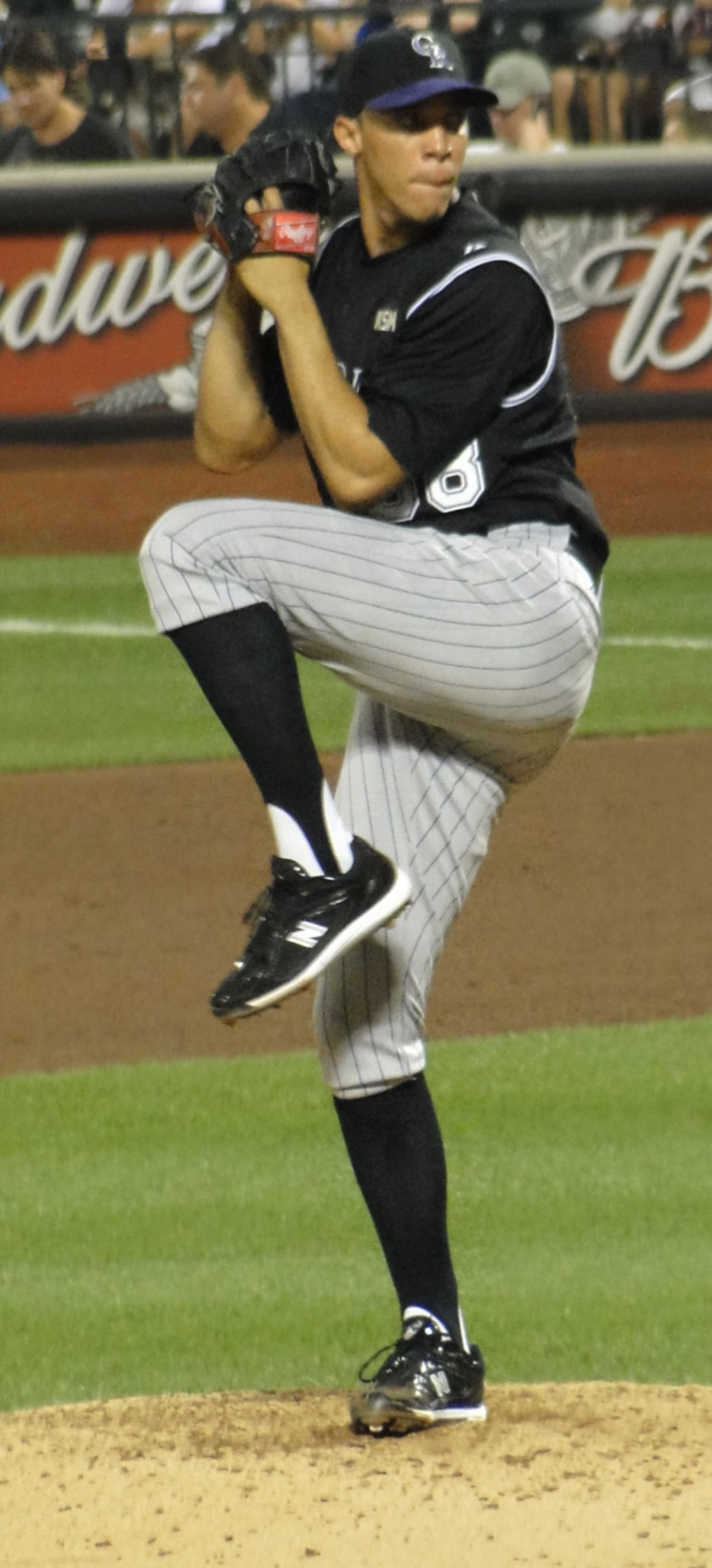
- Jiménez with the Colorado Rockies in 2010
- Pitcher
- Born: January 22, 1984 (age 42); Nagua, Dominican Republic
- Batted: Right Threw: Right

MLB debut
- September 26, 2006, for the Colorado Rockies

Last MLB appearance
- September 22, 2017, for the Baltimore Orioles

MLB statistics
- Win–loss record: 114–117
- Earned run average: 4.34
- Strikeouts: 1,720
- Stats at Baseball Reference

Teams
- Colorado Rockies (2006–2011); Cleveland Indians (2011–2013); Baltimore Orioles (2014–2017)

Career highlights and awards
- All-Star (2010); Pitched a no-hitter on April 17, 2010

Ubaldo Jiménez García (born January 22, 1984) is a Dominican-American former professional baseball pitcher. He played in Major League Baseball (MLB) for the Colorado Rockies, Cleveland Indians and Baltimore Orioles. Jiménez started the 2010 MLB All-Star Game. That year, he pitched the first no-hitter in Rockies' franchise history.

Jimenez earned his 100th MLB victory on September 22, 2015, as a member of the Orioles, while pitching against the Washington Nationals.

== Early life ==
Ubaldo Jiménez García was born on January 22, 1984, in Nagua, Dominican Republic. His father, Ubaldo, served in the Dominican Army. At 16 years old, he was offered a contract by the New York Mets, but his mother said that he could not sign because he needed to finish high school.

== Professional career ==
=== Minor leagues ===
Jiménez signed with the Colorado Rockies on April 25, 2001, for $50,000 in part because they allowed him to skip training to finish high school. Jiménez made his professional debut in 2002 with the Casper Rockies. He missed most of the 2004 season with a stress reaction in his throwing shoulder.

=== Colorado Rockies (2006–2011) ===
==== 2006–2008 ====
Jiménez made his MLB debut on September 26, 2006. He came in as a relief pitcher for the Colorado Rockies during the eighth inning of an 11–4 home loss to the Los Angeles Dodgers. He allowed two hits and no runs. He made his first MLB start on October 1, the last game of the regular season, against the Chicago Cubs at Wrigley Field. Jiménez allowed three hits and three earned runs over 6 2/3 innings in an 8–5 loss. He didn't receive a decision for the game.

Jiménez started the 2007 season back in the minors but was promoted to the Rockies in July. He earned his first MLB win on July 29, at home against the Dodgers. He pitched six innings, giving up four hits and two earned runs. The Rockies won, 9–6. On September 5, he gave up Barry Bonds's 762nd and final career home run. Jiménez made his MLB postseason debut on October 6 during Game 3 of the National League (NL) Division Series in Colorado against the Philadelphia Phillies. He started the game and pitched six innings, allowing three hits and one earned run, as part of a 2–1 victory, finishing off a series sweep. However, Jiménez didn't receive a decision for the game. He started his second postseason game on October 12, in Game 2 of the NL Championship Series against the Arizona Diamondbacks on the road. He pitched five innings, giving up one hit and one earned run. The Rockies would eventually win the game, 3–2, but Jiménez received his second consecutive postseason no-decision. Colorado swept Arizona and faced the Boston Red Sox in the World Series. Jiménez started Game 2, suffering a 2–1 loss in Boston. He allowed three hits and two earned runs in 4 2/3 innings. Boston went on to sweep Colorado.

In 2008, Jiménez went 12–12 with a 3.99 earned run average. His 34 starts led the National League. He threw the fastest fastball among starters in the majors, averaging 94.9 mph.

==== 2009–2011 ====
In January 2009, Jiménez signed a four-year, $10 million contract with club options for 2013 and 2014. Before the regular season, Jiménez pitched for the Dominican Republic in the 2009 World Baseball Classic. On March 10, he set a tournament single-start strikeout record, fanning 10 of the 13 batters he faced during his 65-pitch, four-inning performance in the first round against the Netherlands.

In his second full season in the majors, he went 15–12 with a 3.47 ERA. Jiménez pitched at least six innings in a franchise-record 25 consecutive starts from May 1 to September 7.

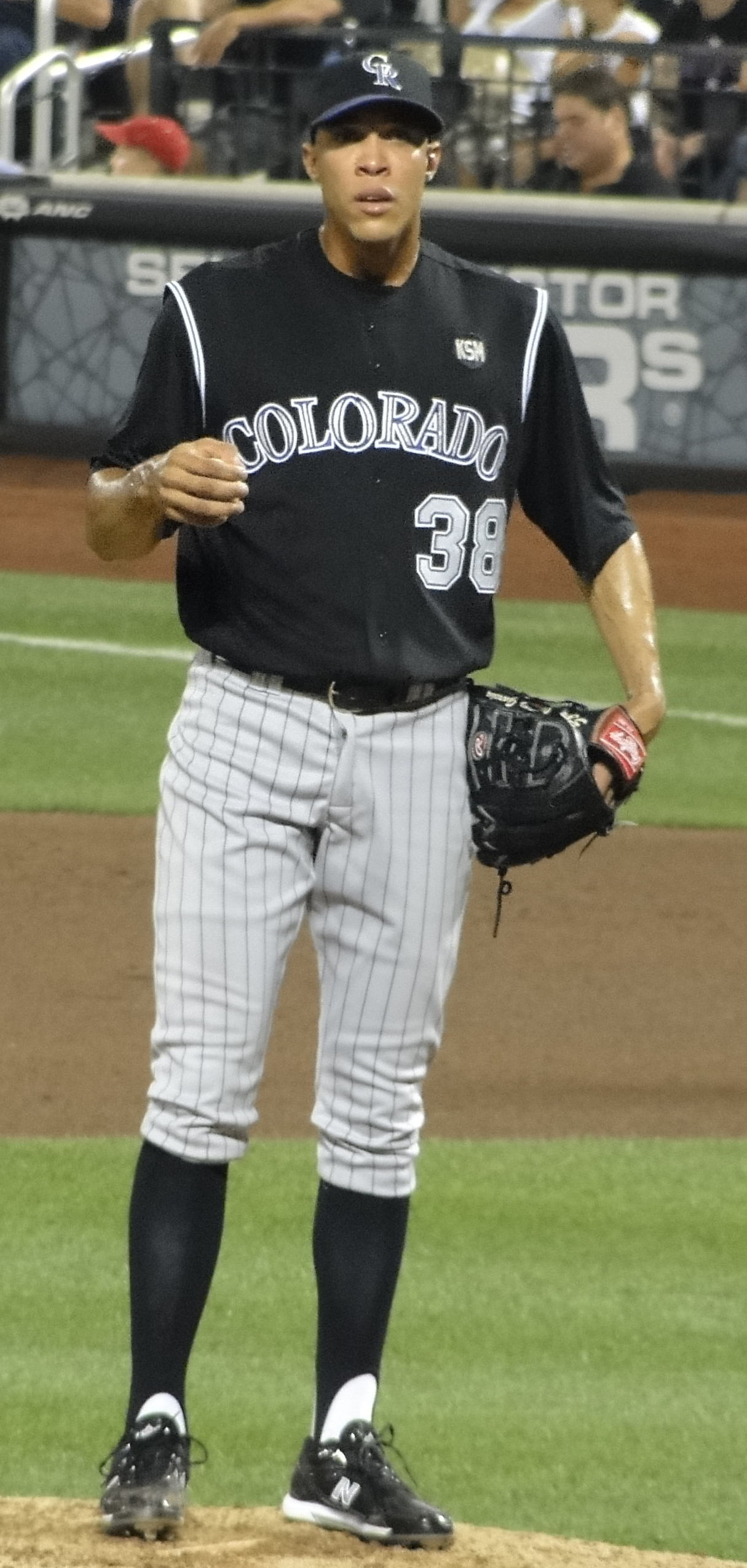
Jiménez with the Rockies in 2010

Jiménez started twice in the NL Division Series, a rematch of the 2007 series against the Phillies. He lost Game 1, allowing five runs in five innings in a 5–1 loss. He pitched better in Game 4, allowing two solo home runs and striking out 7 in seven innings but the Rockies lost the game and the series.

On April 17, 2010, Jiménez no-hit the Atlanta Braves 4–0 at Turner Field, the first no-hitter in the history of the franchise. He walked 6 batters, while striking out 7, and throwing a career-high 128 pitches (72 for strikes). He faced 31 batters in the game. The no-hitter was preserved by a diving catch in center field by Dexter Fowler in the bottom of the seventh inning. Jiménez's fastball reached 100 mph three times during the game, and it averaged 96.8 mph. During the no-hitter, Jiménez switched from the windup to the stretch delivery after issuing a lead-off walk in the fifth inning (his sixth walk of the game). Following the switch, he didn't allow a walk for the rest of the game. Jiménez also helped his cause offensively, scoring Brad Hawpe with a fourth-inning single; he himself scored on a Carlos González double one batter later.

Jiménez was named the NL Pitcher of the Month for April, becoming the second pitcher in Rockies history to win the award. Jiménez was only the second pitcher in MLB history to throw a no-hitter and notch five wins in the month of April. He also set a franchise record for consecutive scoreless innings (22 1/3) for a starting pitcher (the streak was eventually snapped on May 3 after 25 1/3 straight scoreless innings). He broke that mark shortly thereafter, as he went 33 straight scoreless innings from May to June, which was a franchise record for all pitchers (Gabe White previously held the team record of 29 consecutive scoreless innings). Jiménez became the first pitcher since Jack Morris in 1986 to have two streaks of at least 25 consecutive scoreless innings in one season. He was again named NL Pitcher of the Month for May. He became the first pitcher in Rockies history to win the award more than once and the first pitcher since Pedro Martínez in 1999 to win the award in April and May.

Jiménez was the third pitcher in MLB history to win 11 out of his first 12 games and have an ERA below 1.00 (0.93). He had the lowest ERA (0.78) in MLB history through 11 starts. In his one loss, he went seven innings, giving up two hits and one earned run in a 2–0 road loss against the Dodgers. On July 4, Jiménez was one of two Rockies, along with shortstop Troy Tulowitzki, selected to play in the MLB All-Star Game at Angel Stadium in Anaheim, California. He entered the game leading the majors with a 15–1 record and 2.20 ERA. On July 12, Jiménez was named the starting pitcher for the NL All-Star team ahead Tim Lincecum, Roy Halladay, and Adam Wainwright. In two scoreless innings, he threw 25 pitches with two hits, one strikeout, and one walk. The NL won their first All-Star Game since 1996. Jiménez finished the season on a rough note, going 4–7 after the All-Star break. Jiménez finished 19–8 with 214 strikeouts an ERA of 2.88 in 221 2/3 innings pitched for the Rockies. His 19 wins set a single-season Rockies record.

The following season, Jiménez through 21 starts was 6–9 for the Rockies, who at the time were considering trading Ubaldo.

=== Cleveland Indians (2011–2013) ===
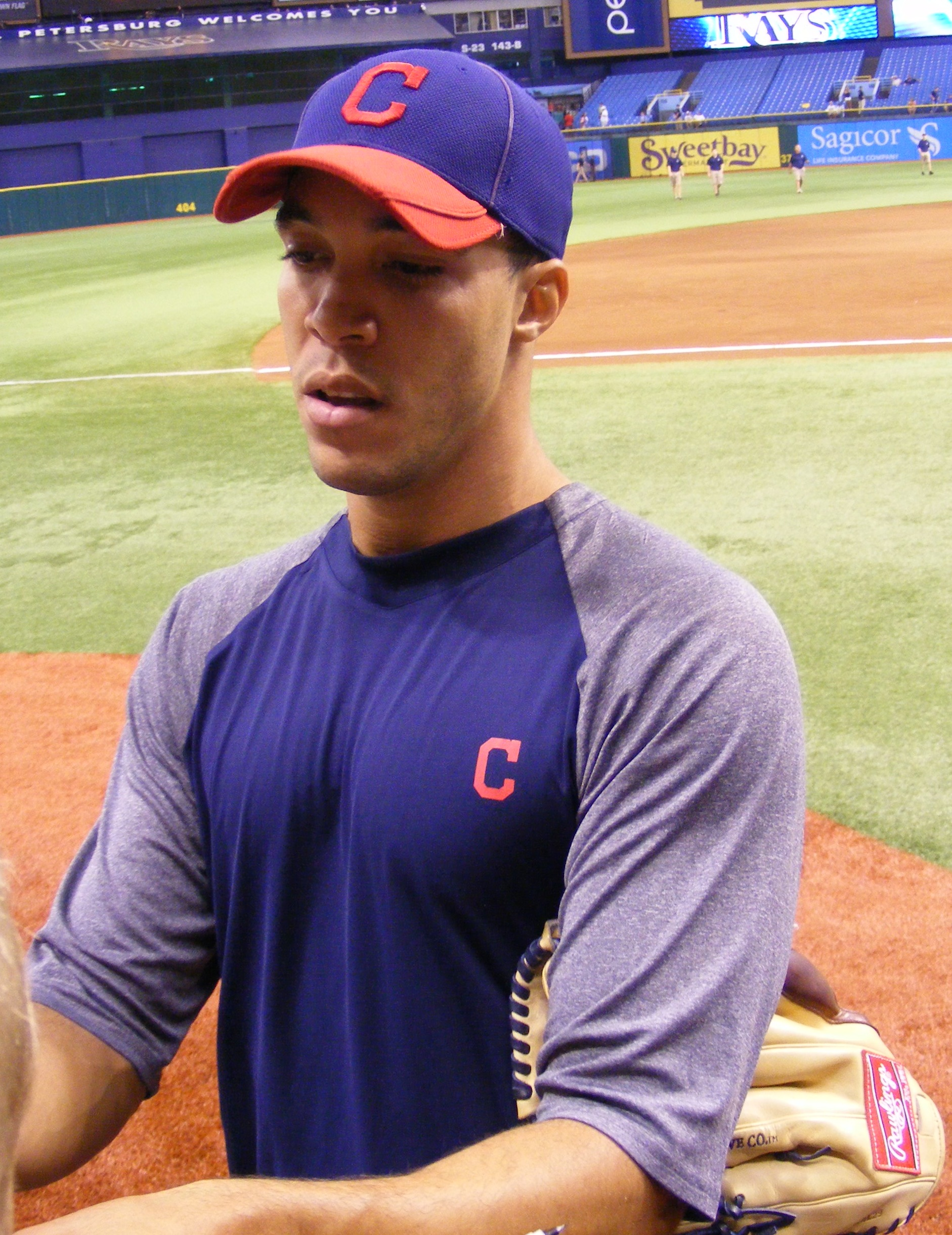
Jiménez signs autographs for fans prior to a game against the Tampa Bay Rays.

On July 31, 2011, the Rockies traded Jiménez to the Cleveland Indians for Alex White, Joe Gardner, Matt McBride, and Drew Pomeranz. Tom Verducci wrote in Sports Illustrated shortly before the trade "Jimenez has terrific stuff, a powerful frame and the work ethic of a blast furnace" but was working an alarming number of innings in high altitude conditions and putting strain on the Rockies' ace. Jiménez would later recount the difficult days he had with the Rockies organization in a 2012 interview during spring training. "It was kind of hard being with the Rockies. I went through a lot of things people outside the organization don't know. But me and the people in the front office know."

On April 2, 2012, Jiménez was suspended five games for hitting former teammate Tulowitzki with a pitch on the elbow the previous day. They walked toward each other and were separated, but neither player was ejected. Jiménez was in conflict with Tulowitzki after he and former teammate Carlos González got lucrative contract extensions after the 2010 season, while Jiménez did not. He originally intended to appeal the suspension but later decided against doing so. In a start against the Toronto Blue Jays on July 14, Jiménez struggled with his command and had his shortest outing on the season, being pulled after 2 1/3 innings, and matched a career-high 8 earned runs. In his previous games his ERA was 2.14 but after the loss, his record fell to 8–8 and ERA rose to 5.09. Jiménez finished with a career worst 17 losses while winning 9 games for the Indians. He led the American League (AL) in losses and wild pitches, with 16.

Jiménez rebounded in 2013, finishing with a 13–9 record in 32 starts for the Indians. He also dropped his ERA to 3.30, two runs lower than the previous season. Jiménez opted out of the final year of his contract with the Indians and became a free agent on November 1.

=== Baltimore Orioles (2014–2017) ===
==== 2014 ====
On February 19, 2014, Jiménez signed a 4-year $50 million contract with the Baltimore Orioles.

In his first start with the Orioles, Jiménez threw six innings against the Red Sox, getting tagged for four runs and a loss. He would go on to lose his next three decisions, as the Orioles lost in his first five starts. He pitched to a 6.59 ERA and went 0–4 in his first month with the O's. His first win with Baltimore came on May 2, when he tossed 7 1/3 scoreless innings against the Minnesota Twins. On July 11, Jiménez was placed on the 15-day DL due to a right ankle sprain.

In his first season with Baltimore, Jiménez was 6–9 with a 4.81 ERA in 25 games (22 starts). He was included on the team's AL Division Series (ALDS) roster, but did not pitch in the series. Despite being on the ALDS roster, Jiménez was left off of the O's AL Championship Series roster against the Kansas City Royals.

==== 2015 ====
On April 11, 2015, in his first start of the season, Jiménez pitched 7 shutout innings, against the Toronto Blue Jays. He allowed only two base runners, a single by José Reyes in the 4th, and a walk to him in 6th, and struck out 8. On April 17, in a start against the Boston Red Sox, Jiménez was ejected for the first time in his career. Jiménez had hit Pablo Sandoval in the right shoulder. Home plate umpire Jordan Baker deemed the hit by pitch intentional, after Sandoval had slid into second baseman Jonathan Schoop to break up a double play.

After starting the first half of the season going 7–4 with a 2.81 ERA in 17 starts, Jiménez had a disappointing second half, as he pitched to a 5.63 ERA with a 5–6 record after the All-Star break. He finished 2015 with a moderate 4.11 ERA in 32 starts. He went 12–10 with a 1.32 WHIP and 168 strikeouts in 184 innings pitched.

==== 2016 ====
Heading into the 2016 season, Jiménez looked to carry on the success from the previous season but struggled mightily in the first half, registering an ERA of 7.38 through 18 appearances. On September 5, Jimenez pitched his first complete game since 2011 and the final one of his career. After allowing a three-run home run in the first inning to the Tampa Bay Rays, Jiménez retired 25 of the final 26 batters he faced, including the final 17 batters of the game. It was also the Orioles' first complete game since September 3, 2014. In his next start, Jiménez lowered his ERA to below six for the first time since May 17. He pitched seven innings of two-run ball, earning his fourth straight quality start and fifth straight start allowing three or fewer runs. Jiménez would finish the season with an 8–12 record and an ERA of 5.44 in 29 games, 25 starts.

In the Wild Card Game, Jimenez entered the game in the bottom of the 11th inning with 1 out and the bases empty. He gave up 3 consecutive hits, with his last career postseason pitch resulting in a game- and season-ending walk-off home run to Edwin Encarnación.

==== 2017 ====
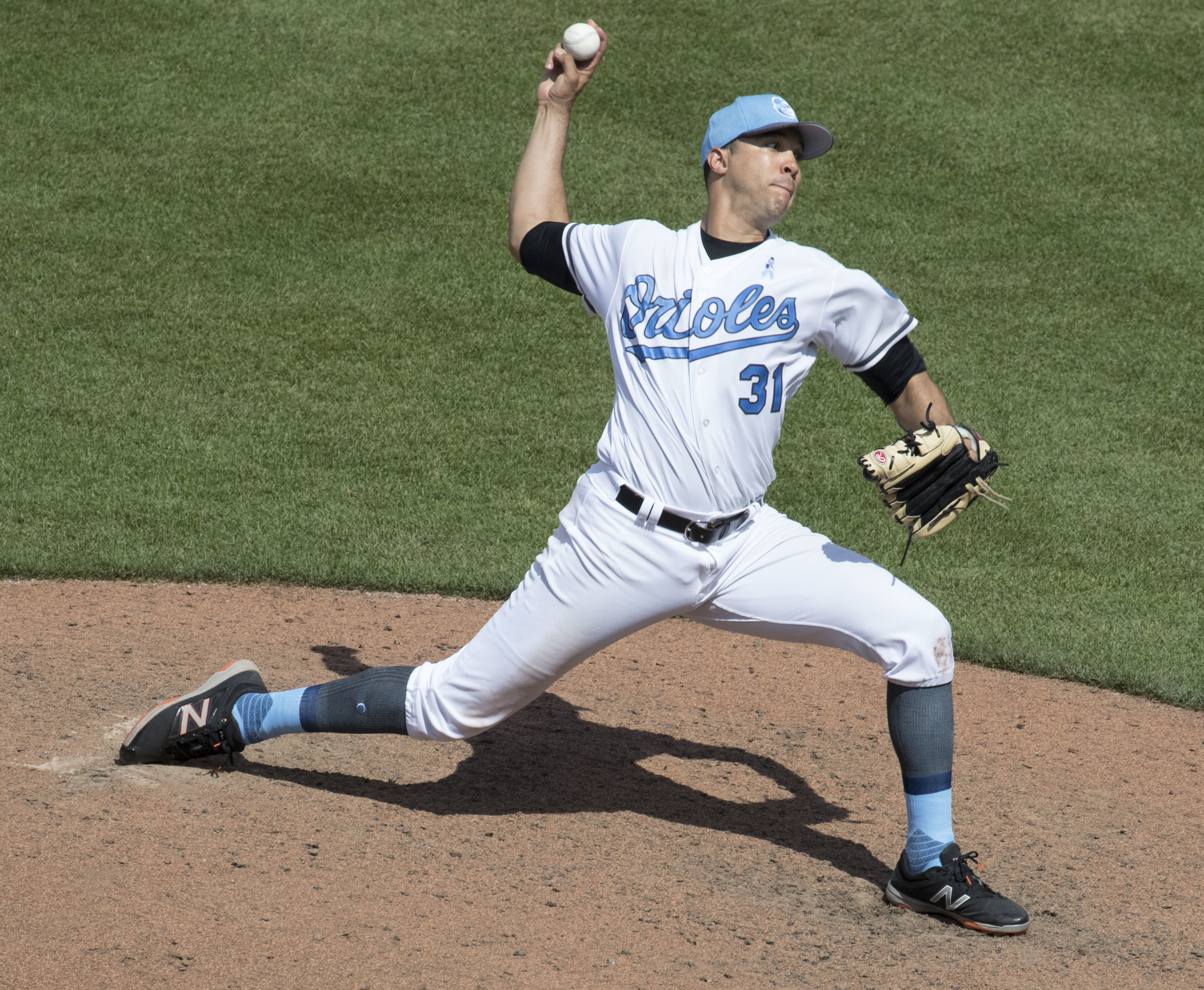
Jiménez with the Baltimore Orioles in 2017

Jiménez opened the season as the Orioles' fourth starter. Jiménez endured his career-worst season, setting career highs in ERA (6.81), earned runs (108), and home runs allowed (33). The 2017 season marked Jiménez's final season in the majors, ending his four-year run in Baltimore with a record of 32–42 and an ERA of 5.22.

=== Colorado Rockies (second stint) and retirement ===
Jiménez did not pitch professionally in 2018 or 2019, coming back in the Dominican Winter League before the 2020 season. On February 5, 2020, Jiménez signed a minor league deal with the Colorado Rockies and was invited to spring training. Jimenez was released by the Rockies organization on July 20, before the start of the season.

Jimenez announced his retirement from professional baseball on September 17, 2020.

== Scouting report ==
Jiménez's four-seam fastball was frequently clocked as high as 96 mph, although later in his career, his average four-seam fastball typically registered between 90 and 93 mph. No one threw more pitches over 95 mph (1,342) than did Jiménez during the 2008 season. In 2010, he was one of only three starting pitchers, along with Justin Verlander and Stephen Strasburg, to have pitched 20 or more pitches of over 100 mph.

Jiménez's two-seam fastball exhibited strong "tailing" action (moving inside on a right-handed batter and away from a left-handed batter), as well as good "sinking" action, though not always by design. His velocity ranged from 89 to 93 mph, though sometimes reaching 94–96 mph. In 2008, Jiménez posted a very robust ground-ball percentage of 54.4%, a testament to this pitch's effectiveness and making him an ideal pitcher for Coors Field, a ballpark known for extra-base hits.

Jiménez was known to throw a split-finger fastball and an occasional forkball, having deceptive downward movement in the 85–88 mph range.

The changeup thrown by Jiménez also exhibited strong "sinking" action, so much so that television commentators unfamiliar with Jiménez often had trouble distinguishing his change-up from a sinking fastball or a split-finger fastball. Jiménez varied the pitch by using both a circle changeup and traditional straight changeup grip. Typically thrown between 85 and 90 mph, the pitch would dive down and away from left-handed batters.

Jiménez's slider was usually thrown between 83 and 85 mph. This pitch fooled batters with an unusually sharp, late break and was used second most in frequency behind his four-seam fastball. Batters often confused this pitch with a fastball (the major league average for a fastball is approximately 91 mph) and due to the tight, late-breaking movement of the pitch, were often unable to hit it.

The final pitch in Jiménez's arsenal was a looping curveball. Used infrequently, it was thrown anywhere between 75 and 82 mph and exhibited a traditional "12–6" break.

== Honors and awards ==
- National League All-Star starting roster in the 2010 Major League Baseball All-Star Game
- 2× National League Pitcher of the Month (April – May 2010)
- No. 24 of Baseball's Best Minor League Players – MLN FAB50 Baseball 2006.
- No. 30 of Baseball's Best Minor League Players – MLN FAB50 Baseball 2005.
- No. 32 of Baseball's Best Minor League Players – MLN FAB50 Baseball 2004.
- The cap Jiménez wore in his 10-strikeout start in the 2009 World Baseball Classic and the cap he wore during his 2010 no-hitter are held by the National Baseball Hall of Fame.

== Personal life ==
In the span of one year, from 2015 to 2016, Jiménez was married, had his first child, and became a U.S. citizen. He and his wife have three children.

== See also ==
- List of Colorado Rockies team records
- List of Major League Baseball no-hitters

Preceded by Mark Buehrle	No-hitter pitcher April 17, 2010	Succeeded by Dallas Braden
Preceded by Tim Lincecum	National League All-Star Game Starting Pitcher; 2010	Succeeded by Roy Halladay
