= 1955 Caribbean Series =

1955 baseball tournament

Tournament details
- Country: Venezuela
- City: Caracas
- Venue(s): 1 (in 1 host city)
- Dates: 10–15 February
- Teams: 4

Final positions
- Champions: (Puerto Rico) Cangrejeros de Santurce (3rd title)
- Runners-up: (Venezuela) Navegantes del Magallanes

Awards
- MVP: (United States) Don Zimmer

The seventh edition of the Caribbean Series (Serie del Caribe) was played in 1955. It was held from February 10 through February 15, featuring the champion baseball teams from Cuba, Alacranes de Almendares; Panama, Carta Vieja Yankees; Puerto Rico, Cangrejeros de Santurce, and Venezuela, Navegantes del Magallanes. The format consisted of 12 games, each team facing the other teams twice. The games were played at Estadio Universitario in Caracas, the capital city of Venezuela, which boosted capacity to 22,690 seats, while the ceremonial first pitch was thrown by Marcos Pérez Jiménez, by then the President of Venezuela.

== Summary ==
Puerto Rico won the Series with a 5–1 record en route for a third straight championship. The Cangrejeros club was managed by Herman Franks and led by the dynamic shortstop Don Zimmer, who posted a .400 batting average (8-for-20) with a .950 slugging and led the hitters with three home runs. Santurce also received a considerable support from outfielders Willie Mays (two HR, nine RBI, six runs, 885 SLG), Roberto Clemente (one HR, .577 SLG, seven runs) and Bob Thurman (.318). Also helping out were catcher Harry Chiti (.333, one HR, .667 SLG) and third baseman Buster Clarkson (.313). Bill Greason (2–0, 2.00 ERA), Sad Sam Jones (1–0, 1.50) and Rubén Gómez (1–0) led the pitching staff, while Zimmer claimed Most Valuable Player honors. Puerto Rico also had veteran OF Luis Rodríguez Olmo in addition to Tite Arroyo (P) and George Crowe (1B). Mays, after going 0-for-13 in the Series, hit a two-out, two-run walk-off homer in the 11th inning of Game 6. Then, he went 11-for-13 in the next three games to finish with a second-best average of .462 (12-for-26) and leading the series in RBI.

The Venezuelan team finished in second place with a 4–2 record and was managed by Lázaro Salazar. Magallanes was responsible for the only defeat suffered by Santurce, 7–2 in the closing game, and previously had been beaten by Cuba 1–0 in a pitching duel and by Puerto Rico, 4–2 in an extra-inning game. It was the best performance by a Venezuelan team to that point. The offensive was led by part-time OF Pablo García, who hit .500 (6-for-12), including three runs, six RBI and a .917 SLG. Other contributions came from 2B Jack Lohrke (.348, four runs, .478 SLG), 1B Bob Skinner (.280. two HR, four RBI), RF George Wilson (.381, five RBI, .762 SLG), 3B Luis García (6-for-21, two runs, two RBI) and Chico Carrasquel (five runs, four RBI). José Bracho (2–0, 0.53 ERA) led a pitching staff that included Emilio Cueche (1–1, 2.00), Joe Margoneri (1–0, 2.00), Ramón Monzant (0–1, 3.27) and reliever Bill Kennedy (1–0), 0.00). Also in the roster were outfielders Bob Lennon (5-for-19) and Dalmiro Finol (2-for-13).

Guided by Bobby Bragan, Almendares finished 2–4 for the worst record ever by a Cuban team in the Series. A one-man offensive attack, 1B Rocky Nelson led the Series hitters with a .471 average (8-for-18) and collected a .647 SLG. Other support came from C Gus Triandos (.263, two HRs, seven RBI, .579 SLG). The starting staff was composed by Cholly Naranjo (1–0, 2.00 ERA), Joe Hatten (1–1, 3.00), Red Munger (0–1, 7.50) and Roger Bowman (0–1, 5.00). Other players for Cuba included Ps Lino Donoso, Al Lyons and Conrado Marrero; IFs Willy Miranda, Héctor Rodríguez and José Valdivielso, as well as OFs Román Mejías, Carlos Paula, Earl Rapp and Lee Walls.

For last place Panama, managed by Al Kubski, the top player was LF Guilford Dickens, who batted .364 with a .682 SLG and hit both of the team's home runs. SP Humberto Robinson (1–0, 12 SO, 1.64 ERA) recorded the only victory for Carta Vieja, while Bill Harris and Ernie Lawrence both finished 0–2. Other players included Milt Graff (IF), John Fitzgerald (P), Fred Marolewski (IF) and Spider Wilhelm (IF)

== Participating teams ==
Team	Manager
(Cuba) Alacranes del Almendares	(United States) Bobby Bragan
(Puerto Rico) Cangrejeros de Santurce	(United States) Herman Franks
(Panama) Carta Vieja Yankees	(United States) Al Kubski
(Venezuela) Navegantes del Magallanes	(Cuba) Lázaro Salazar

== Final standings ==
Pos	Team	Pld	W	L	RF	RA	RD	PCT	GB
1	(Puerto Rico) Cangrejeros de Santurce	6	5	1	32	21	+11	.833	—
2	(Venezuela) Navegantes del Magallanes (H)	6	4	2	30	12	+18	.667	1
3	(Cuba) Alacranes del Almendares	6	2	4	18	24	−6	.333	3
4	(Panama) Carta Vieja Yankees	6	1	5	10	33	−23	.167	4

Source: CBPC
(H) Hosts

== Scoreboards ==
=== Game 1, February 10 ===
Team	1	2	3	4	5	6	7	8	9	R	H	E
Puerto Rico	0	1	0	4	0	0	1	0	0	6	8	2
Cuba	0	0	0	1	0	1	0	0	0	2	3	1
WP: Rubén Gómez (1-0) LP: Red Munger (0-1); Home runs: PUR: Don Zimmer (1); CUB: None

=== Game 2, February 10 ===
Team	1	2	3	4	5	6	7	8	9	R	H	E
Panama	0	0	0	0	0	0	0	0	0	0	7	3
Venezuela	3	1	1	0	1	1	0	2	X	9	14	2
WP: José Bracho (1-0) LP: Bill Harris (0-1); Notes: Bracho hurled a complete game shutout.

=== Game 3, February 11 ===
Team	1	2	3	4	5	6	7	8	9	R	H	E
Panama	0	0	0	0	0	0	1	0	0	1	5	3
Puerto Rico	1	0	0	0	1	0	0	0	X	2	5	2
WP: Bill Greason (1-0) LP: Ernie Lawrence (0-1); Home runs: PAN: None; PUR: Don Zimmer (2), Bill Greason (1)

=== Game 4, February 11 ===
Team	1	2	3	4	5	6	7	8	9	R	H	E
Venezuela	0	0	0	0	0	0	0	0	0	0	4	0
Cuba	0	0	0	0	0	0	1	0	X	1	2	2
WP: Joe Hatten (1-0) LP: Emilio Cueche (0-1); Notes: Both pitchers went all the way despite a 45-minute delay in the top of the 7th inning.

=== Game 5, February 12 ===
Team	1	2	3	4	5	6	7	8	9	R	H	E
Panama	1	0	0	0	0	1	0	0	1	3	9	2
Cuba	0	0	2	0	0	0	0	0	0	2	8	2
WP: Humberto Robinson (1-0) LP: Lino Donoso (0-1) Sv: Ray Dabek (1)

=== Game 6, February 12 ===
Team	1	2	3	4	5	6	7	8	9	10	11	R	H	E
Venezuela	1	1	0	0	0	0	0	0	0	0	0	2	3	0
Puerto Rico	1	1	0	0	0	0	0	0	0	0	2	4	10	1
WP: Sad Sam Jones (1-0) LP: Ramón Monzant (0-1); Home runs: VEN: None; PUR: Roberto Clemente (1), Willie Mays (1); Notes: Both pitchers went all the way. The two-run, walk off homer by Mays, was his first hit in 14 Series at bat.

=== Game 7, February 13 ===
Team	1	2	3	4	5	6	7	8	9	R	H	E
Cuba	0	0	0	1	4	1	0	0	0	6	9	1
Puerto Rico	0	0	0	0	0	3	0	1	3	7	13	1
WP: Jorge Sackie (1-0) LP: Roger Bowman (0-1); Home runs: CUB: None; PUR: Don Zimmer (3)

=== Game 8, February 13 ===
Team	1	2	3	4	5	6	7	8	9	R	H	E
Venezuela	0	2	0	1	0	0	1	0	2	6	11	0
Panama	0	0	0	0	1	0	0	0	0	1	7	1
WP: Bill Kennedy (1-0) LP: Alberto Osorio (0-1); Notes: Bracho allowed an earned run in four-plus innings and Kennedy earned the victory in 5⅔ scoreless innings of relief.

=== Game 9, February 14 ===
Team	1	2	3	4	5	6	7	8	9	R	H	E
Puerto Rico	0	5	4	0	0	0	0	0	4	11	16	1
Panama	0	0	0	3	0	0	0	0	0	3	4	1
WP: Bill Greason (2-0) LP: Bill Harris (0-2); Home runs: PUR: Harry Chiti (1); PAN: None; Notes: Greason threw his second complete win in the Series.

=== Game 10, February 14 ===
Team	1	2	3	4	5	6	7	8	9	R	H	E
Cuba	0	1	0	3	0	0	0	0	0	4	9	2
Venezuela	0	0	1	1	3	1	0	0	X	6	11	1
WP: Emilio Cueche (1-1) LP: Joe Hatten (1-1); Home runs: CUB: Gus Triandos (1); VEN: None; Notes: Cueche completed his second start of the Series.

=== Game 11, February 15 ===
Team	1	2	3	4	5	6	7	8	9	R	H	E
Cuba	0	1	0	1	0	0	1	0	0	3	5	0
Panama	1	0	0	0	0	0	0	0	1	2	11	1
WP: Cholly Naranjo (1-0) LP: Ernie Lawrence (0-2); Home runs: CUB: Gus Triandos (2); PAN: None

=== Game 12, February 15 ===
Team	1	2	3	4	5	6	7	8	9	R	H	E
Puerto Rico	1	0	0	0	1	0	0	0	0	2	9	2
Venezuela	4	0	1	0	0	1	1	0	X	7	10	0
WP: Joe Margoneri (1-0) LP: Jorge Sackle (1-1); Home runs: PUR: Willie Mays (2); VEN: None

== Statistics leaders ==
Statistic	Player	Team	Total
Batting average	(United States) Rocky Nelson	(Cuba) Alacranes del Almendares	.471
Home runs	(United States) Don Zimmer	(Puerto Rico) Cangrejeros de Santurce	3
Runs batted in	(United States) Willie Mays	(Puerto Rico) Cangrejeros de Santurce	9
Runs	(Puerto Rico) Roberto Clemente	(Puerto Rico) Cangrejeros de Santurce	8
Hits	(United States) Willie Mays	(Puerto Rico) Cangrejeros de Santurce	11
Doubles	(United States) Don Zimmer	(Puerto Rico) Cangrejeros de Santurce	3
Triples	(Cuba) Pablo García	(Venezuela) Navegantes del Magallanes	2
Triples	(United States) George Wilson	(Venezuela) Navegantes del Magallanes	2
Stolen bases	(United States) Jack Lohrke	(Venezuela) Navegantes del Magallanes	2
Wins	(United States) Bill Greason	(Puerto Rico) Cangrejeros de Santurce	2
Earned run average	(Venezuela) José Bracho	(Venezuela) Navegantes del Magallanes	0.69
Strikeouts	(United States) Joe Hatten	(Cuba) Alacranes del Almendares	12
Saves	(United States) Ray Dabek	(Panama) Carta Vieja Yankees	1
Innings pitched	(Venezuela) Emilio Cueche	(Venezuela) Navegantes del Magallanes	18.0
Innings pitched	(United States) Bill Greason	(Puerto Rico) Cangrejeros de Santurce	18.0

== Awards ==
Tournament Awards
Award	Player	Team
MVP	(United States) Don Zimmer	(Puerto Rico) Cangrejeros de Santurce
Best manager	(United States) Herman Franks	(Puerto Rico) Cangrejeros de Santurce

All Star Team
Position	Player	Team
First base	(United States) Rocky Nelson	(Cuba) Alacranes del Almendares
Second base	(United States) Jack Lohrke	(Venezuela) Navegantes del Magallanes
Third base	(United States) Buster Clarkson	(Puerto Rico) Cangrejeros de Santurce
Shortstop	(United States) Don Zimmer	(Puerto Rico) Cangrejeros de Santurce
Left field	(United States) Guilford Dickens	(Panama) Carta Vieja Yankees
Center field	(United States) Willie Mays	(Puerto Rico) Cangrejeros de Santurce
Right field	(United States) George Wilson	(Venezuela) Navegantes del Magallanes
Catcher	(United States) Harry Chiti	(Puerto Rico) Cangrejeros de Santurce
Pitcher	(United States) Bill Greason	(Puerto Rico) Cangrejeros de Santurce

== See also ==
- Ballplayers who have played in the Series

== Sources ==
- Antero Núñez, José. Series del Caribe. Jefferson, Caracas, Venezuela: Impresos Urbina, C.A., 1987.
- Gutiérrez, Daniel. Enciclopedia del Béisbol en Venezuela – 1895-2006 . Caracas, Venezuela: Impresión Arte, C.A., 2007.
