= Joe Margoneri =

American baseball player (born 1930)

- Pitcher
- Born: January 13, 1930 (age 96); Somerset, Pennsylvania, U.S.
- Batted: Left Threw: Left

MLB debut
- April 25, 1956, for the New York Giants

Last MLB appearance
- June 3, 1957, for the New York Giants

MLB statistics
- Win–loss record: 7–7
- Earned run average: 4.29
- Strikeouts: 67
- Stats at Baseball Reference

Teams
- New York Giants (1956–1957)

Joseph Emanuel Margoneri (born January 13, 1930) is an American former pitcher who played in Major League Baseball in the 1956 and 1957 seasons. Listed at 6 ft 0 in (1.83 m), 185 lb (84 kg), he batted and threw left-handed.

== Career ==
A native of Somerset, Pennsylvania, Margoneri was signed by the New York Giants in 1950, but he saw his baseball career interrupted by a stint in the Army. Upon being drafted, Margoneri served at Brooke Army Medical Center in San Antonio, Texas from 1952 to 1953.

After being discharged from military service, Margoneri pitched for the Navegantes del Magallanes club of the Venezuelan Winter League, and was responsible for the only defeat suffered by the Puerto Rican Cangrejeros de Santurce champion team, 7–2, in the closing game of the 1955 Caribbean Series. Margoneri pitched a complete game against a lineup that included future Hall of Famers Roberto Clemente and Willie Mays, as well as Harry Chiti, Buster Clarkson, George Crowe, Luis Olmo and Don Zimmer.

Margoneri was 26 years old when he entered the majors in 1956 with the Giants, playing for them two years. In 1956 he had a 6–6 record with a 3.93 earned run average in a pitching rotation that included Johnny Antonelli (20–13), Rubén Gómez (7–17), Al Worthington (7–14) and Jim Hearn (5–11). The next year he worked almost exclusively as a left-handed specialist out of the bullpen. In a two-season major league career, Margoneri posted a 7–7 record with a 4.29 ERA in 36 pitching appearances, including 15 starts and three complete games, giving up 60 earned runs on 132 hits and 70 walks while striking out 67 in 126 innings of work.

After baseball, Margoneri worked from 1962 through 1991 in the corrugated paper business as a supervisor for the International Paper Company and the St. Regis Paper Company in the city of Pittsburgh.

== See also ==
- 1956 New York Giants season
- 1957 New York Giants season
