= Pablo García (baseball) =

Cuban baseball player (1923–1997)

- Outfielder / Third baseman
- Born: June 23, 1923; Ranchuelo, Villa Clara, Cuba
- Died: December 30, 1997 (aged 74); Ranchuelo, Villa Clara, Cuba
- Batted: Right Threw: Right

Teams
- Cuban Winter League: Leones del Habana (1946–1950); Elefantes de Cienfuegos (1950–1954); Alacranes de Almendares (1956); Mexican League: Industriales de Monterrey (1947–1948); Sultanes de Monterrey (1949–1953); Leones de Yucatán (1956); Triple-A American Association: Charleston Senators (1955); Venezuelan Winter League: Navegantes del Magallanes (1946; 1954–55); Santa Marta BBC (1954–55)

Career highlights and awards
- VWL Champion Bat (1946); Led Caribbean Series in triples and slugging (1955)

Pablo García Álvarez (June 23, 1923 – December 30, 1997) was a Cuban professional baseball player. Born in Ranchuelo, Villa Clara Province, he batted and threw right-handed.

== Career ==
A line drive hitter, García was also an aggressive baserunner with range, hands, and arm strength at third base and corner outfield spots.

García played sandlot ball during his childhood, starting in the early 1940s in a semi-professional baseball club based in Trinidad, a tiny town in the province of Sancti Spíritus, central Cuba.

At 23, García debuted professionally with the legendary Habana BBC of the Cuban Winter League in 1946, playing with them for five and a half seasons, before joining the Elefantes de Cienfuegos (1950–1954) and Alacranes del Almendares (1956). In a ten-season career, he posted a batting average of .261 (301-for-1,153) with 12 home runs and 135 runs batted in in 388 games. Additionally, he amassed 44 doubles, nine triples, 132 runs scored, and 16 stolen bases.

In 1946, García was used sparingly by Habana in his rookie season, appearing in just 13 games while hitting 083 (1-for-12) with one RBI. Late in the year, he found an opportunity to play regularly with the Navegantes del Magallanes in the Venezuelan Winter League, where he batted .403 (31-for-77) and slugged .523 in 21 games, becoming the first batting average champion in the league's inaugural 1946 season.

García returned to winter ball in Venezuela during the 1954–1955 season, dividing his playing time between Santa Marta BBC and Magallanes. He hit a combined .350 with 29 runs driven in and slugged .496 in 38 games during the two trips. As the league champion, Magallanes represented Venezuela in the 1955 Caribbean Series. The Venezuelan team finished in second place with a 4-2 record and was responsible for the only defeat suffered by Puerto Rico's champion Cangrejeros de Santurce, a team which featured players such as Roberto Clemente, Buster Clarkson, Willie Mays, Bob Thurman, and Series' MVP Don Zimmer. For his part, García led the Magallanes offensively in the tournament, hitting .500 (6-for-12), including one double, a pair of triples, six RBI, three runs and a .917 slugging in part-time duties, while leading the Series in slugging and tying with teammate George Wilson for the most triples.

In between, García played nine Minor League Baseball seasons spanning 1947–1956, all of them in the Mexican League, where he performed for the Industriales/Sultanes de Monterrey and the Leones de Yucatán, except for a brief appearance at Triple-A Charleston Senators in 1955.

His most productive season came in 1950 with Monterrey, when he hit a career-high .345 (112-for-325) and topped the league with 27 doubles. He also enjoyed a good season in 1951, hitting .320 (103-for-326), while leading the league in doubles (28) and triples (11). Overall, García sported a .306/.417/.446 slash line with 556 runs, 467 RBI, and 114 stolen bases in 778 games.

A long time resident of Monterrey, Mexico, García retired in 1956 and returned to Cuba three years later. He died in 1997 in his homeland of Ranchuelo, at the age of 74, after suffering a heart attack.
