= 1993 Caribbean Series =

1993 baseball tournament

The thirty-fifth edition of the Caribbean Series (Serie del Caribe) was played in 1993. It was held from February 4 through February 9 with the champions teams from the Dominican Republic, Águilas Cibaeñas; Mexico, Venados de Mazatlán; Puerto Rico, Cangrejeros de Santurce, and Venezuela, Águilas del Zulia. The format consisted of 12 games, each team facing the other teams twice, and was played at Estadio Teodoro Mariscal in Mazatlán, Mexico.

== Summary ==
It was the second straight Caribbean Series held in Mexico, as an attempt to keep high attendance after the disappointing revenues from the previous two editions played at Miami.

The Series had to go more than the scheduled 12 games when both Dominican Republic and Puerto Rico teams ended with a similar 4–2 record. The Cangrejeros de Santurce of Puerto Rico clinched the title after beating the Águilas Cibaeñas in a tiebreaker game. In the decisive match, Santurce got revenge for two round-robin defeats to the Dominican squad. The Mexico and Venezuela clubs would finish round robin tied for third place, with a 2–4 record.

With Mako Oliveras at the helm, the Cangrejeros won the final game behind a strong effort from Kevin Brown, who pitched 5 1/3 scoreless innings of relief to get the win, highlighted by a three-hit performance from DH Dickie Thon, which included a two-run home run. Santurce 1B Hector Villanueva earned MVP honors, as he led the hitters with a .533 batting average and nine runs batted in, adding two homers to share the Series lead. The pitching staff was led by Mike Cook, who posted a 2–0 record and a perfect 0.00 ERA in 11 innings of work. Other contributions came from relievers Darryl Scott (one save, 0.00 ERA, 10 strikeouts, five innings) and Willie Fraser (0–1, 0.90 ERA). Also in the roster was veteran catcher Junior Ortiz (.375 BA), as well as outfielders Eric Fox and Gerald Williams.

The Cibao club was managed by Julián Javier and featured players such as IF Andújar Cedeño (.381 BA), C Tony Peña (.300 BA) and OF Moisés Alou (.273, two HR), as well as pitchers José Martínez (1–0, 0.77) and Dave Johnson (1–0, 1.29).

The Venados of Mazatlán were managed by Ramón Montoya and received support from OF Matías Carrillo, who belted two homers and slugged .600, and from pitchers Mike García (no hits in five innings) and Earnie Johnson (no runs in eight innings). Fernando Valenzuela hurled one gem against Dominican Republic and did not have a decision, but his performance earned him a comeback to the Major Leagues with the Baltimore Orioles in the upcoming season.

The Águilas del Zulia were guided by Pompeyo Davalillo, and included big leaguers Jay Baller, Pedro Castellano, Cris Colón, Jason Grimsley, Urbano Lugo, Julio Machado and Eduardo Zambrano, among others.

== Final standings ==
Country	Club	W	L	W/L %	Managers
Puerto Rico (*)	Cangrejeros de Santurce	5	2	.714	Mako Oliveras
Dominican Republic	Águilas Cibaeñas	4	3	.571	Julián Javier
Mexico	Venados de Mazatlán	2	4	.333	Ramón Montoya
Venezuela	Águilas del Zulia	2	4	.333	Pompeyo Davalillo
* Won the championship game

== Individual leaders ==
Player	Statistic
Batting
Héctor Villanueva (PUR)	Batting average	.533
José Muñoz (PUR)	Runs	6
Andújar Cedeño (DOM); Héctor Villanueva (PUR)	Hits	8
Six tied	Doubles	2
Three tied	Triples	1
Moisés Alou (DOM); Matías Carrillo (MEX); Héctor Villanueva (PUR)	Home runs	2
Héctor Villanueva (PUR)	RBI	9
Moisés Alou (DOM)	Stolen bases	3
Pitching
Mike Cook (PUR)	Wins	2
Five tied	Strikeouts	7
Mike Cook (PUR)	ERA	0.00
Four tied	Saves	1
Mike Cook (PUR)	Innings pitched	11.0

== All-Star Team ==
Name	Position
Tony Peña (DOM)	Catcher
Héctor Villanueva (PUR)	First baseman
José Muñoz (PUR)	Second baseman
Andújar Cedeño (DOM)	Third baseman
Cristóbal Colón (VEN)	Shortstop
Edwin Alicea (PUR)	Left fielder
Moisés Alou (DOM)	Center fielder
Matías Carrillo (MEX)	Right fielder
Dickie Thon (PUR)	Designated hitter
Mike Cook (PUR)	Right-handed pitcher
Earnie Johnson (MEX)	Left-handed pitcher
Mike Garcia (MEX)	Relief pitcher
Awards
Héctor Villanueva (PUR)	Most Valuable Player
Mako Oliveras (PR)	Manager

== See also ==
- Ballplayers who have played in the Series

== Sources ==
- Nuñez, José Antero (1994). Serie del Caribe de la Habana a Puerto la Cruz. JAN Editor. ISBN 980-07-2389-7
