= Bob Thurman =

American baseball player (1917-1998)

- Outfielder / Pitcher
- Born: May 14, 1917; Kellyville, Oklahoma, U.S.
- Died: October 31, 1998 (aged 81); Wichita, Kansas, U.S.
- Batted: Left Threw: Left

Professional debut
- NgL: 1946, for the Homestead Grays
- MLB: April 14, 1955, for the Cincinnati Redlegs

Last MLB appearance
- April 21, 1959, for the Cincinnati Redlegs

MLB statistics
- Batting average: .246
- Home runs: 35
- Runs batted in: 106
- Stats at Baseball Reference

Teams
- Homestead Grays (1946–1948); Kansas City Monarchs (1949); Cincinnati Redlegs (1955–1959)

Member of the Caribbean

Baseball Hall of Fame
- Induction: 2020
Military career
Allegiance	United States
Branch	United States Army
Service years	1942–1945
Conflicts	World War II (Pacific Theater)

Robert Burns Thurman (May 14, 1917 – October 31, 1998) was an American professional baseball pitcher, outfielder and pinch-hitter. He played in the Negro leagues, the Puerto Rican winter league (where he was a star), and for a few years at the end of his career, in Major League Baseball with the Cincinnati Reds. He is a member of the Puerto Rican Baseball Hall of Fame.

== Background ==
Several baseball reference books give Thurman's date of birth as 1921. However, like so many Negro leaguers, Thurman took some years off his age in order to interest scouts in developing him as a prospect. 1917 is the correct year of his birth, as he admitted after his playing career was over. He made his major league debut at the age of 38, and was still in the big leagues at 42.

A left-hander, he was listed at 6 ft 1 in (185 cm) and 205 pounds (93 kg).

Thurman played semipro ball with various teams in the Wichita area before entering the U.S. Army at the beginning of World War II. He was stationed in New Guinea and Luzon and saw combat action in the Pacific Theater. When he was discharged in 1945, the Homestead Grays in the Negro National League offered him a contract.

== Negro leagues ==
He started with the Grays in 1946, playing alongside such greats as catcher Josh Gibson, first baseman Buck Leonard and outfielder Cool Papa Bell. His pitching was not impressive, but he played in the outfield as well. He hit .408 for the season. The following year he hit .338 with 6 home runs in 157 at-bats.

In 1948 he posted a 6–4 win–loss record as a starting pitcher, and also hit .345 to help the Grays win the last Negro National League pennant. They went on to defeat the Birmingham Black Barons in the World Series, but after this season the powerhouse Grays were dismantled, along with the league. With the fall of the color barrier in the major leagues in 1947, Negro leagues teams began to lose their star players and also their fan support.

Thurman also played winter ball in Puerto Rico for twelve seasons, eleven with the Cangrejeros de Santurce and one with the Leones de Ponce. With Santurce he was a great fan favorite. Thurman led the league in homers in the 1947–48 season with 9, and the following season he had 18. At the end of his career in Puerto Rico he was and still is the All-Time Home Run leader with 120.

In 1949 he reported to the Kansas City Monarchs of the newly reorganized Negro American League. The Monarchs were managed by Buck O'Neil and their roster included stars and future stars like Willard Brown, Booker McDaniels, Nat Peeples and Elston Howard.

== Minor leagues ==
Thurman's big year in Puerto Rico had not gone unnoticed in the major leagues. On July 29, 1949, it was announced that the New York Yankees had purchased his contract from the Monarchs. He was assigned to the Newark Bears of the International League, where he hit three homers in his first week. For the season, he hit .317 for the Bears in 59 games, before a hand injury sidelined him.

The Yankees transferred him to the Chicago Cubs and he spent the 1950 season with Springfield in the International League. There his batting average fell to .269. The next two years he was with the San Francisco Seals of the Pacific Coast League, where he hit .274 and .280. The Cubs still had not integrated at the major league level.

== Dominican Summer League ==
Thurman had continued playing with Santurce in the Puerto Rican league. He was one of the biggest names in Latin American baseball. The Dominican Summer League was founded in the early 1950s. It was an "outlaw" league (not affiliated with major league baseball), and tried to lure big-name minor leaguers with generous salary offers. Thurman signed with Escogido in the new league and was suspended from organized baseball. He played in the Dominican Republic for two years, leading the league in homers and RBI in 1954 and also pitching occasionally.

== Puerto Rican winter league ==
When the Dominican League joined organized baseball in 1955, Thurman was in limbo. He was still under contract to the Cubs, but they showed no interest. He was still playing winter ball in Puerto Rico, and his 1954–55 season got him noticed again. He hit .323 with 14 homers for the Santurce Crabbers, a team that Don Zimmer called "the best winter league baseball club ever assembled", or as baseball historian Jorge Colón Delgado called them, "The Perfect Machine."

Zimmer played shortstop, Ron Samford was the second baseman, Valmy Thomas and Harry Chiti were the catchers, and Thurman was in right field. Willie Mays played center field and led the league in batting. Left fielder, Roberto Clemente, hit .344 for fourth place in the league. George Crowe played first base, and former Negro leagues star Buster Clarkson was at third. Rubén Gómez, Sam Jones (MVP and Triple Crown winner) and Bill Greason were the pitching staff. Thurman still continued to pitch occasionally.

== Cincinnati Reds ==
Impressed with his winter season, the Cincinnati Reds bought his contract from the Cubs, for a reported $2,000. He made his major league debut on April 14, 1955, the same day Elston Howard became the first black man to play for the New York Yankees. Thurman hit 7 homers in only 152 at-bats, although his average fell to .217. The following year he hit .295 in only 139 chances, with 8 homers. On August 18, 1956, he hit three consecutive homers and a double against the Milwaukee Braves.

Back with the Reds in 1957, he was hitting .351, but by the end of June his average had dropped to .259. On August 2 he was sent down to the Seattle Rainiers of the Pacific Coast League. He hit 8 home runs in the Pacific Coast League before being recalled by the Reds later in August. For the 1957 Reds Thurman hit 16 home runs in 190 at bats. His home run per at-bat percentage of 8.4% was better than Duke Snider who led the league at 7.9%, although Thurman lacked the plate appearances to qualify officially.

== Return to the minor leagues ==
Thurman played the entire 1958 season with the Reds and had a few pinch-hitting appearances with them in 1959. His final game was April 21, 1959. He was sent back to the minor leagues that year, but failed to hit well with Seattle or with Omaha of the American Association. In 1960 he hit .274 with Charleston, also of the American Association. He was now 43 years old. In 1961 he retired as a player, after 21 games with Charlotte in the South Atlantic League.

== After his playing career ==
Thurman had a career .246 average in 334 major league games. He hit 35 homers and drove in 106 runs in 663 at-bats. He played 12 seasons in the Puerto Rican winter league. He is the league's all-time home run hitter, and a member of the Puerto Rican Baseball Hall of Fame.

He joined the Minnesota Twins as a scout after his playing career ended, and later scouted for the Reds and the Royals. He died in Wichita, Kansas in 1998, aged 81.

== See also ==
- List of Negro league baseball players who played in Major League Baseball
- List of Major League Baseball players from Puerto Rico
