= Cangrejeros de Santurce =

Cangrejeros de Santurce, Spanish for "Santurce Crabbers", refers to several teams based in San Juan, Puerto Rico:

- Cangrejeros de Santurce (baseball), baseball team of the Puerto Rico Baseball League
- Cangrejeros de Santurce (basketball), basketball team of the Baloncesto Superior Nacional league
