= Don Zimmer =

American baseball player and manager (1931–2014)

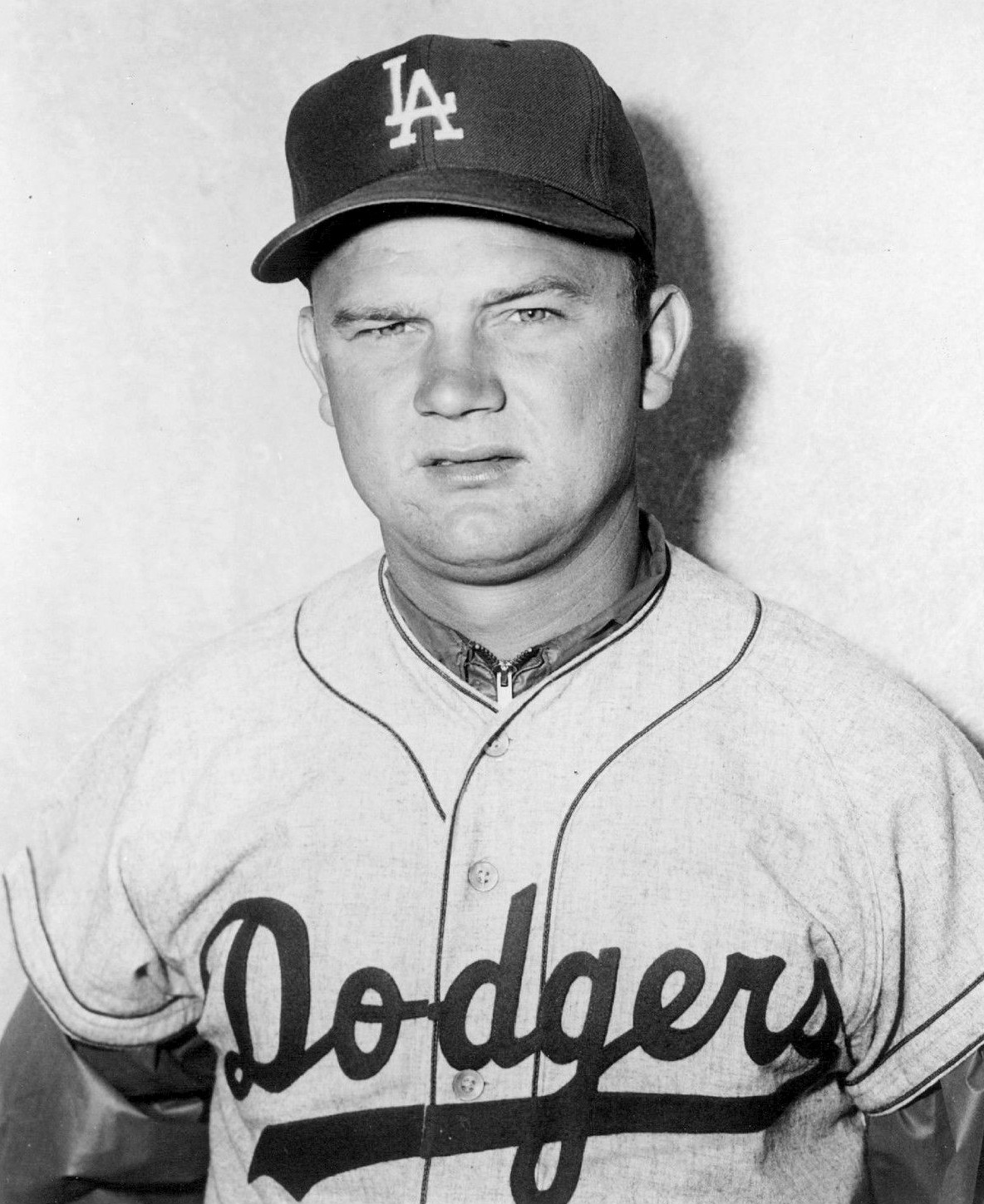
- Zimmer in 1959
- Infielder / Manager
- Born: January 17, 1931; Cincinnati, Ohio, U.S.
- Died: June 4, 2014 (aged 83); Dunedin, Florida, U.S.
- Batted: Right Threw: Right

MLB debut
- July 2, 1954, for the Brooklyn Dodgers

Last MLB appearance
- October 2, 1965, for the Washington Senators

MLB statistics
- Batting average: .235
- Home runs: 91
- Runs batted in: 352
- Managerial record: 885–858
- Winning %: .508
- Stats at Baseball Reference
- Managerial record at Baseball Reference

Teams
- As player: Brooklyn / Los Angeles Dodgers (1954–1959); Chicago Cubs (1960–1961); New York Mets (1962); Cincinnati Reds (1962); Los Angeles Dodgers (1963); Washington Senators (1963–1965); Toei Flyers (1966); As manager: San Diego Padres (1972–1973); Boston Red Sox (1976–1980); Texas Rangers (1981–1982); Chicago Cubs (1988–1991); As coach: Montreal Expos (1971); San Diego Padres (1972); Boston Red Sox (1974–1976); New York Yankees (1983); Chicago Cubs (1984–1986); New York Yankees (1986); San Francisco Giants (1987); Boston Red Sox (1992); Colorado Rockies (1993–1995); New York Yankees (1996–2003); Tampa Bay Devil Rays / Rays (2004–2014)

Career highlights and awards
- 2× All-Star (1961, 1961²); 6× World Series champion (1955, 1959, 1996, 1998–2000); NL Manager of the Year (1989); Tampa Bay Rays No. 66 retired; Boston Red Sox Hall of Fame; Tampa Bay Rays Hall of Fame

Donald William Zimmer (January 17, 1931 – June 4, 2014) was an American infielder, manager, and coach in Major League Baseball (MLB). Zimmer was involved in professional baseball from 1949 until his death, a span of 65 years, across 8 decades.

Zimmer signed with the Brooklyn Dodgers as an amateur free agent in 1949. He played in the major leagues with the Dodgers (1954–1959, 1963), Chicago Cubs (1960–1961), New York Mets (1962), Cincinnati Reds (1962), and Washington Senators (1963–1965). Shortly thereafter came a stint with the Toei Flyers of Nippon Professional Baseball in 1966.

In between, Zimmer saw action in all or parts of 18 minor league seasons spanning 1949–1967. He also played winter baseball with the Elefantes de Cienfuegos and the Tigres de Marianao of the Cuban League during the 1952–53 season, as well as for the 1954–55 Puerto Rican League champion Cangrejeros de Santurce en route to the 1955 Caribbean Series. Zimmer led his team to the Series title, topping all hitters with a .400 batting average (8-for-20), three home runs and a .950 slugging percentage, while claiming Most Valuable Player honors.

During a minor league game on July 7, 1953, Zimmer was struck in the head by a pitch from Jim Kirk and lost consciousness, and developed blood clots on his brain that required two operations. He woke up two weeks later, thinking that it was the day after the game where the incident took place. This eventually led to Major League Baseball adopting mandatory batting helmets as a safety measure to be used by players when at-bat.

Following his retirement as a player, Zimmer began his coaching career. He worked in Minor League Baseball, before coaching the Montreal Expos (1971), San Diego Padres (1972), Boston Red Sox (1974–76, 1992), New York Yankees (1983, 1986, 1996–2003), Cubs (1984–1986), San Francisco Giants (1987), Colorado Rockies (1993–1995), and Tampa Bay Devil Rays / Rays (2004–2014). He served as manager for the Padres (1972–73), Red Sox (1976–1980), Texas Rangers (1981–82), and Cubs (1988–1991).

== Playing career ==
Zimmer was nicknamed "Zim", "Gerbil", and sometimes "Popeye" because of his facial resemblance to the cartoon character, In addition, he was dubbed "El Galleguito" (The little Galician) in Cuba as well as "El Soldadito" (The little soldier) in Mexico and Puerto Rico.

Zimmer began his career in 1949 with the Cambridge Dodgers of the Class-D Eastern Shore League. He then played with the Hornell Dodgers of the Class-D PONY League in 1950, the Elmira Pioneers of the Single-A Eastern League in 1951, the Mobile Bears of the Double-A Southern League in 1952, and the St. Paul Saints of the Triple-A American Association in 1953 and 1954. He made his major league debut with the Brooklyn Dodgers in 1954. Zimmer's big league career lasted 12 seasons, almost exclusively as a utility infielder. Notably, he played for the 1955 World Series champion Brooklyn Dodgers, and with the 1962 New York Mets, who lost a then-record 120 games.

Immediately following his rookie season, Zimmer played winter ball in Puerto Rico, emerging as a dark horse 1955 Caribbean Series MVP on the heavy-hitting 1954–1955 Cangrejeros de Santurce club managed by Herman Franks. Nicknamed El Escuadrón del Pánico (lit. "The Panic Squad"), the team featured future Hall-of-Famers Willie Mays and Roberto Clemente, future All-Stars George Crowe and Sam Jones, local hero Luis Olmo, as well as Negro leagues stars Bob Thurman and Buster Clarkson. It was later described by Zimmer as "probably the best winter league baseball club ever assembled."

While with St. Paul in 1953, Zimmer nearly died after being hit in the temple with a pitch. He was not fully conscious for 13 days, during which holes were drilled in his skull to relieve the pressure of swelling. His vision was blurred, he could neither walk nor talk and his weight plunged from 170 to 124. He was told his career was finished at age 22; nonetheless, the following year Zimmer reached the Major Leagues.

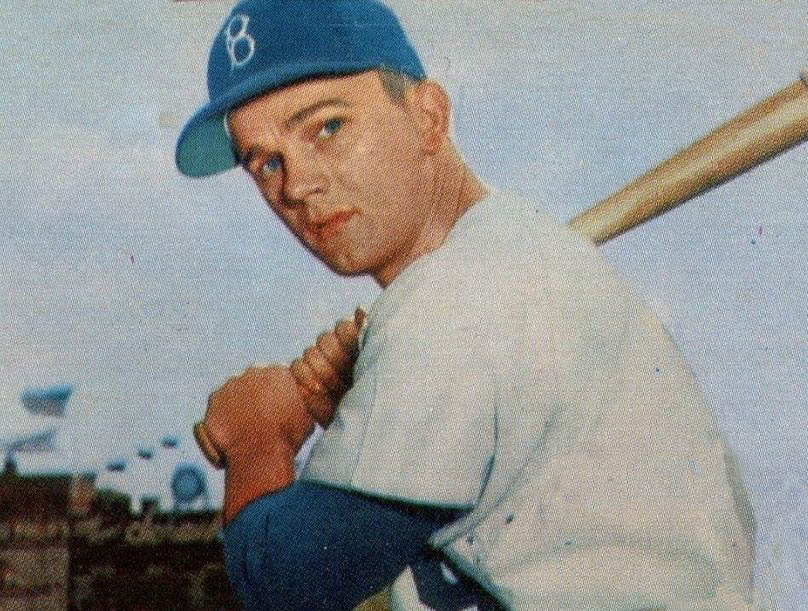
Zimmer as he appeared in a Bowman trading card, 1955

Zimmer was beaned again in 1956 when a fastball thrown by Cincinnati Reds' pitcher Hal Jeffcoat broke his cheekbone and almost caused a detached retina but he persevered. Because of these injuries it was widely reported that he had a surgically implanted steel plate in his head. This was false, although the holes drilled in the surgeries following the 1953 beanball were later filled with four tantalum metal corkscrew-shaped "buttons."

In the major leagues, Zimmer remained with the Los Angeles Dodgers after their move west in 1958. In 1960, the Dodgers traded Zimmer to the Chicago Cubs for Johnny Goryl, Ron Perranoski, Lee Handley and $25,000. After the 1961 season, the expansion New York Mets chose Zimmer from the Cubs as the fifth pick in the premium phase of the 1961 Major League Baseball expansion draft, costing the Mets $125,000. In May 1962, the Mets traded Zimmer to the Cincinnati Reds for Cliff Cook and Bob Miller. He returned briefly to the Dodgers in 1963, when the Reds traded him to the Dodgers for Scott Breeden. The Washington Senators purchased Zimmer from the Dodgers in June 1963. The Senators released Zimmer after the 1965 season, and he played for the Toei Flyers of Nippon Professional Baseball in 1966.

In 12 seasons, Zimmer played 1,095 games. He compiled 773 hits, 91 home runs, 352 RBI, 45 stolen bases and a .235 batting average. He played in the World Series with the Dodgers in 1955 and 1959, and was selected to the National League All-Star team in 1961. Although he had a low career batting average, Zimmer was regarded as a fine infielder, willing to fill in at third base, shortstop, and second base. He also caught 33 games in his final season with Washington in 1965.

== Coaching and managing career ==
=== Minor leagues ===
Zimmer served as a player-manager for the Cincinnati Reds with the Double-A Knoxville Smokies and Triple-A Buffalo Bisons in 1967. Zimmer ended his playing career after the 1967 season, and he managed the Triple-A Indianapolis Indians in 1968. In 1969, he left the Reds' organization for the expansion San Diego Padres, piloting the Class-A Key West Padres before moving up to the Triple-A Salt Lake City Bees in 1970.

=== Major Leagues ===
==== Montreal Expos and San Diego Padres (1971–1973) ====
In 1971, he joined the Montreal Expos as third-base coach, working under former Dodger Gene Mauch. He spent a year with Mauch, then returned to the Padres to take up a similar post for 1972. But after only 11 games, he was asked to replace Preston Gómez as San Diego's skipper on April 27. The promotion gave Zimmer, now 41, his first managerial job in the major leagues.

Zimmer compiled a 54–88 record for the remainder of 1972, then posted a 60–102 mark in 1973, each season finishing last in the National League West Division. The Padres' attendance woes caused the team's founding majority owner, C. Arnholdt Smith, to sell the club amidst rumors it might move to Washington, D.C. When new owner Ray Kroc bought the team, Zimmer and most of his coaching staff were dismissed.

==== Boston Red Sox (1974–1980) ====
He then was hired as the third-base coach for the Boston Red Sox, serving for 2½ seasons. Working under skipper Darrell Johnson, Zimmer's tenure included a memorable event during Game 6 of the 1975 World Series. Boston had the bases loaded and no one out in the home half of the ninth inning. The score was tied. A soft fly to left field was too shallow to score the winning run, but baserunner Denny Doyle thought Zimmer's shouts of "No! No! No!" were actually "Go! Go! Go!" He ran for home, and was thrown out at the plate. That play, and Dwight Evans' brilliant catch off Joe Morgan in extra innings, set up Carlton Fisk's classic, game-winning home run.

The 1976 Red Sox never got on track under Johnson, who was replaced by Zimmer as manager on July 19. He led them to a winning record, but a disappointing third-place finish in the AL East. The Red Sox would win more than 90 games in each of Zimmer's three full seasons (1977–1979) as manager, only the second time they had pulled off this feat since World War I. His 1978 team won 99 games, still the fourth-best record in franchise history.

However, he is best remembered among Red Sox fans for the team's dramatic collapse during the 1978 season. After leading the Yankees by as many as fourteen games, the Red Sox stumbled in August. By early September that lead was reduced to four games. That lead evaporated in a four-game series against the surging New York Yankees which is still known as "the Boston Massacre."

The Red Sox spent the last month of the season trading first place with the Yankees, forcing a one-game playoff on October 2. In that game, the Yankees took the lead permanently on a home run by Bucky Dent over Fenway Park's Green Monster.

During this stretch, Zimmer made several questionable personnel moves. He never got along with left-handed starting pitcher Bill "Spaceman" Lee. The feeling was mutual; Lee nicknamed Zimmer "the Gerbil." Zimmer's outright hatred of Lee ran so deep that he gave the starting assignment in the last game of the "Massacre" to rookie Bobby Sprowl, who had only been called up from Triple-A Pawtucket a few days earlier. Reportedly, Carl Yastrzemski pleaded with Zimmer to start Lee, who, along with Luis Tiant, had dominated the Yankees during their careers. (Lee, for example, won 12 out of 17 decisions against the Yankees in 10 years with Boston.) Sprowl allowed four walks, one hit and one run in the first inning before being pulled and made only three more major-league starts.

Zimmer also started Fisk, the team's longtime starting catcher, 154 times (out of a possible 162), a heavy workload for a catcher. Fisk complained of sore knees for much of this stretch and missed most of the next season with a sore arm. Finally, Zimmer kept third baseman Butch Hobson in the lineup, even though Hobson's elbow miseries (he had floating bone chips which he frequently rearranged before coming to the plate) made it impossible for him to hit for power or average, or throw accurately. Hobson made 18 errors during August and September 1978 (and a league-leading 43 errors for the season, resulting in an abysmal .899 fielding percentage). Finally, Zimmer called on Jack Brohamer to replace Hobson on September 23; with Brohamer at third, Boston won its last eight games of the regular season to force a tie with the Yankees, but the Red Sox lost the playoff game on home runs by Dent and Reggie Jackson.

==== 1981–1995 ====
Zimmer next managed the Texas Rangers. He spent less than two years in the job and his firing by owner Eddie Chiles was different. Zimmer was fired on a Monday but asked to remain on through Wednesday's game before being replaced by Darrell Johnson. When asked for the reason he fired Zimmer, Chiles said it was "something personal" but refused to elaborate further.

After Texas, Zimmer coached three stints with the Yankees (1983, 1986, 1996–2003), then coached for the San Francisco Giants in 1987. He served as third base coach for the Chicago Cubs from 1984 to 1986. Zimmer took over as manager of the Cubs in 1988. In 1989, he managed the Cubs to a division title and was named Manager of the Year. He was fired as Cubs manager during the 1991 season after a slow start. Later, he returned to Boston for one season as a coach (under manager Hobson) in 1992. Overall, Zimmer won 906 Major League games as a manager.

Zimmer was on the first coaching staff of the expansion Colorado Rockies in 1993 under manager Don Baylor. On June 6, 1995, he left the bench during the fifth inning of the game against St. Louis, which came to the surprise of players and staff (he had told Baylor about plans to retire a few weeks beforehand). He was unhappy that Baylor had become close to Art Howe, who was added to the Rockies coaching staff in 1995.

==== New York Yankees and Tampa Bay Rays (1996–2014) ====
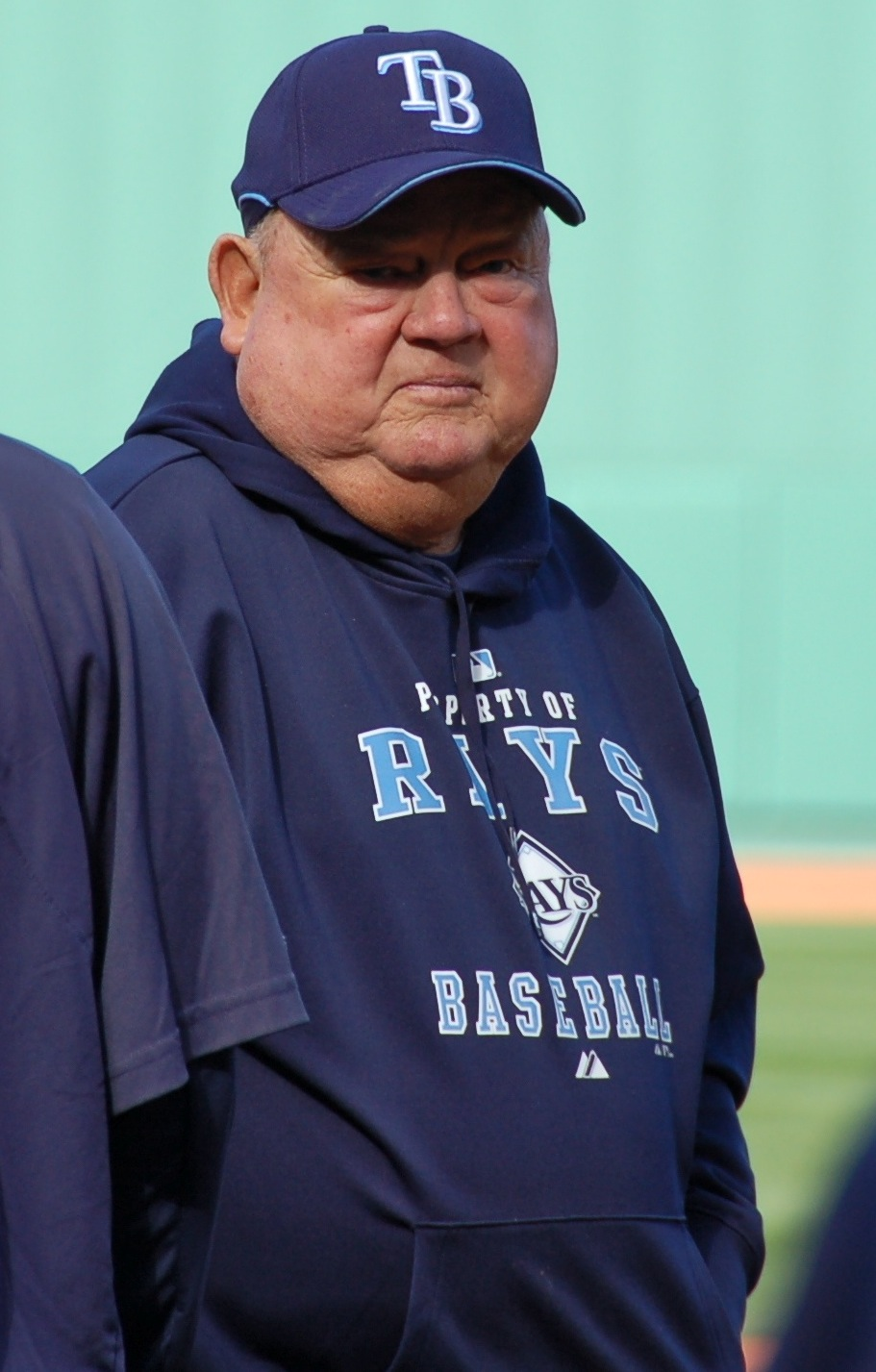
Zimmer with the Rays in 2009

In 1996, he joined the Yankees as their bench coach for their run of four World Series titles. In 1999, Zimmer filled in for manager Joe Torre while he was recuperating from treatment for prostate cancer. Zimmer went 21–15 while guiding the Yankees during Torre's absence. (This record, however, is credited to Torre's managerial record.)

In 1999, Zimmer was hit by a sharply struck foul ball batted by Yankee second baseman Chuck Knoblauch. The next game, Zimmer wore an army helmet with the word "ZIM" painted on the side and the Yankees logo stenciled on the front, which was given to him by Michael Patti, a Madison Avenue advertising executive. This led to the installation of railed fencing in front of the dugouts at Yankee Stadium, which eventually became commonplace at all ballparks. Zimmer was involved in an incident with Pedro Martínez in the 2003 American League Championship Series, when he lunged at Martinez and Martinez defensively maneuvered to the side and pushed him to the ground. Zimmer accepted responsibility for the altercation and was apologetic to his family and the Yankees organization but maintained that Martínez was "one of the most unprofessional players" he had ever known.

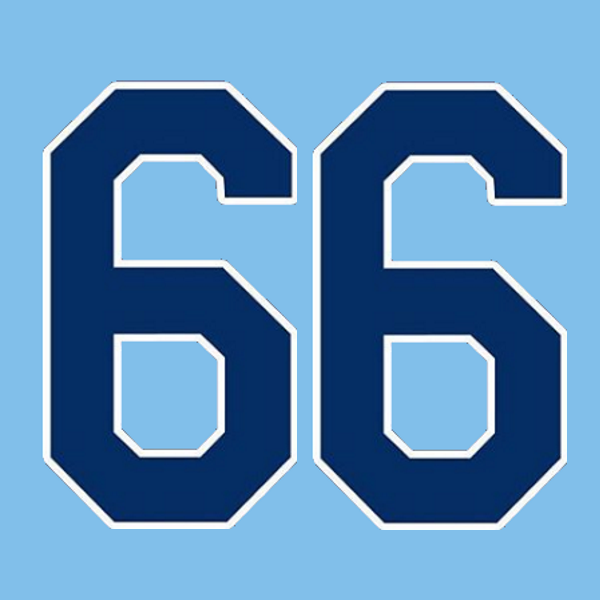
Don Zimmer's number 66 was retired by the Tampa Bay Rays in 2015.

Zimmer was a senior advisor for the Tampa Bay Rays from 2004 to 2014. His role included assisting the team during spring training and during home games. Every year, Zimmer incremented his uniform number by one to match the number of years he has worked in baseball. During the 2014 season he wore #66. (In 2014, longtime Tampa Bay third base coach Tom Foley wore Zimmer's name and number on the back of his own uniform in tribute.) Zimmer often noted that every paycheck he'd ever gotten came from baseball, and that he never held a job in any other profession.

Zimmer wrote two books, Zim: A Baseball Life, and The Zen of Zim, that describe his life in baseball, as a player, manager, and coach.

From the 2008 season to his death, Zimmer was one of the last former Brooklyn Dodgers (along with pitchers Don Newcombe and Tommy Lasorda and announcer Vin Scully) still in baseball in some capacity. Zimmer also served as a member of the advisory board of the Baseball Assistance Team, a 501(c)(3) non-profit organization dedicated to helping former Major League, Minor League, and Negro league players through financial and medical difficulties.

On March 24, 2015, the Rays announced they were retiring number 66 in honor of Zimmer.

==== Managerial record ====
Team	Year	Regular season					Postseason			
Team	Year	Games	Won	Lost	Win %	Finish	Won	Lost	Win %	Result
SD	1972	142	54	88	.380	6th in NL West	–	–	–	–
SD	1973	162	60	102	.370	6th in NL West	–	–	–	–
SD total		304	114	190	.375		0	0	–	
BOS	1976	76	42	34	.553	3rd in AL East	–	–	–	–
BOS	1977	161	97	64	.602	3rd in AL East	–	–	–	–
BOS	1978	163	99	64	.607	2nd in AL East	–	–	–	–
BOS	1979	160	91	69	.569	3rd in AL East	–	–	–	–
BOS	1980	155	82	73	.529	Fired	–	–	–	–
BOS total		715	411	304	.575		0	0	–	
TEX	1981	55	33	22	.600	2nd in AL West	–	–	–	–
TEX	1981	50	24	26	.480	3rd in AL West	–	–	–	–
TEX	1982	96	38	58	.396	Fired	–	–	–	–
TEX total		201	95	106	.473		0	0	–	
CHC	1988	162	77	85	.475	4th in NL East	–	–	–	–
CHC	1989	162	93	69	.574	1st in NL East	1	4	.200	Lost NLCS (SF)
CHC	1990	162	77	85	.475	5th in NL East	–	–	–	–
CHC	1991	37	18	19	.486	Fired	–	–	–	–
CHC total		523	265	258	.507		1	4	.200	
Total		1743	885	858	.508		1	4	.200	

== Personal life ==
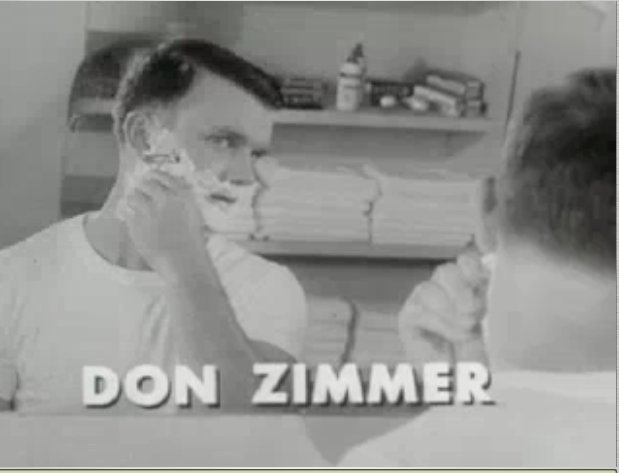
Zimmer shaving in a commercial for Gillette razors, c. 1958

Zimmer grew up in Cincinnati, Ohio. His father owned a wholesale fruit and vegetable company. At home plate before a night game in Elmira, New York on August 16, 1951, Zimmer married Soot (Carol Jean Bauerle), whom he had started dating in 10th grade. Until his death in June 2014, they were still married and lived in Seminole, Florida. They had lived in the Tampa Bay Area since the late 1950s.

Zimmer's son Thomas is a scout with the San Francisco Giants. Zimmer also had a daughter, Donna, and four grandchildren. A grandson, Beau, works as a reporter at WTSP 10, St. Petersburg, Florida.

In December 2008, Zimmer suffered a stroke, causing loss of speech for a week.

On June 4, 2014, Zimmer died at age 83 in Dunedin, Florida, from heart and kidney problems.

== Bibliography ==
- Zimmer, Don; Madden, Bill (2001). Zim: A Baseball Life. Total Sports. ISBN 1-930844-19-0.
- Zimmer, Don (2004). The Zen of Zim: Baseballs, Beanballs, and Bosses. Thomas Dunne Books. ISBN 0-312-33430-3.

Sporting positions
Preceded by Dick Williams	Montreal Expos third-base coach 1971	Succeeded by Jim Bragan
Preceded by Eddie Popowski; Dick Berardino	Boston Red Sox third-base coach 1974–1976; 1992	Succeeded by Eddie Popowski; Rick Burleson
Preceded by Franchise established Ron Hassey	Colorado Rockies third-base coach 1993; 1995	Succeeded by Ron Hassey; Jackie Moore
Preceded by Glenn Sherlock	New York Yankees bench coach 1996–2003	Succeeded by Willie Randolph
