= Charlie White (baseball) =

American baseball player (1927-1998)

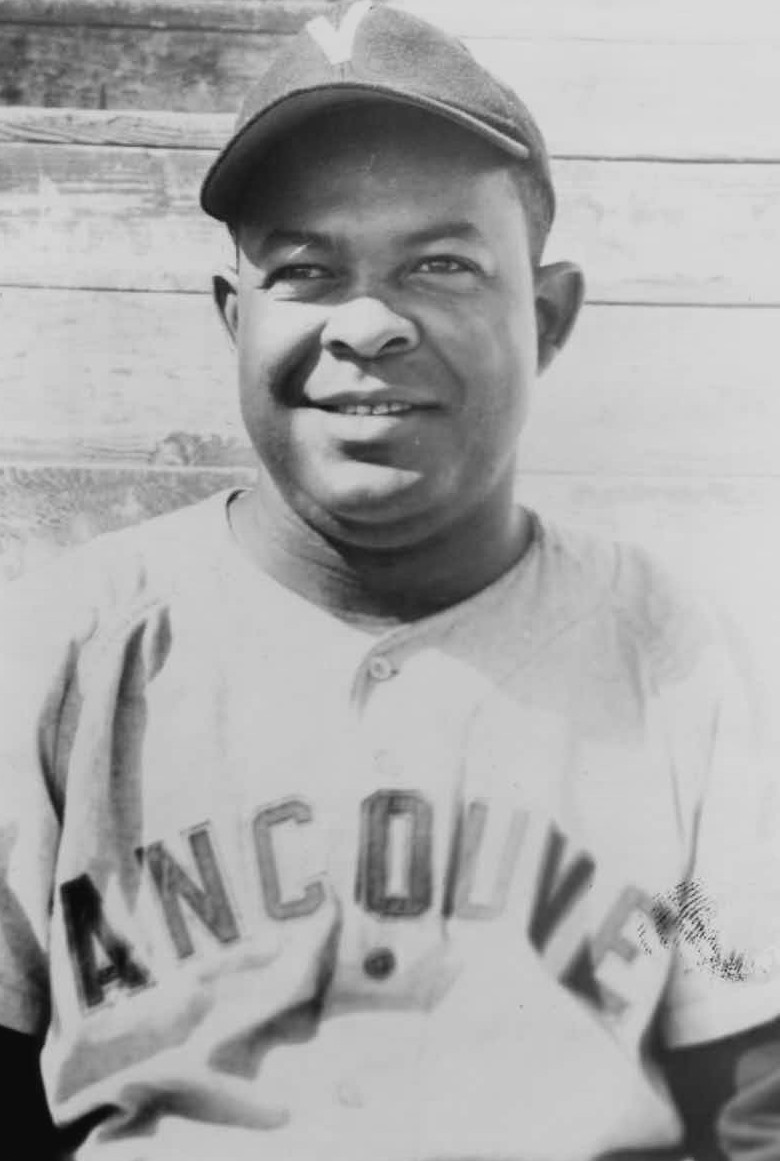
- Catcher
- Born: August 12, 1927; Kinston, North Carolina
- Died: May 26, 1998 (aged 70); Seatac, Washington
- Batted: Left Threw: Right

Professional debut
- NgL: 1950, for the Philadelphia Stars
- MLB: April 18, 1954, for the Milwaukee Braves

Last MLB appearance
- May 29, 1955, for the Milwaukee Braves

MLB statistics
- Batting average: .236
- Hits: 29
- Runs batted in: 12
- Stats at Baseball Reference

Teams
- Negro leagues: Philadelphia Stars (1950); Major League Baseball: Milwaukee Braves (1954–1955)

Career highlights and awards
- NgL All-Star (1950)

Charles White (August 12, 1927 – May 26, 1998) was an American professional baseball player who had a 15-year career in the game, including full seasons in the Negro leagues and in Major League Baseball. The catcher was a native of Kinston, North Carolina; he was 5 feet 11 inches (1.80 m) tall, weighed 192 pounds (87 kg), batted left-handed and threw right-handed.

== Early career ==
White broke into pro ball with the Philadelphia Stars of the Negro American League in 1950. After that season, he was acquired by the St. Louis Browns, whose owner, Bill Veeck, was active in integrating his organization's playing ranks. White spent three seasons in the upper levels of minor league baseball in the Browns' farm system before being traded to the Milwaukee Braves prior to the 1954 season.

== Major League career ==
White then spent the entire 1954 season and the first two months of 1955 on the Braves' National League roster. Playing behind one of the league's workhorse catchers, Del Crandall, White appeared in 50 games in 1954, 16 as a starting catcher (while Crandall started 133 of the Braves' 154 games). In his third Major League game, on April 23 against the St. Louis Cardinals at Busch Stadium, White hit his only big-league home run, a solo blow in the top of the 13th inning off Cot Deal. The homer temporarily put the Braves ahead, 5–4, and they would triumph, 7–5, in 14 innings with White handling the catching chores. He also had a three-hit game (in five at bats) against the Cardinals at Busch Stadium on July 5. But he batted only .237 for the season. At the outset of the 1955 campaign, White again backed up Crandall, and in the season's first two months he started nine games at catcher and batted .233. After his final MLB game on May 29, White played 101/2 more seasons at the Triple-A level, ten of them in the Pacific Coast League.

In his 62-game big-league career, White had 29 hits, including five doubles as well as his home run.

== See also ==
- List of Negro league baseball players who played in Major League Baseball
