= List of Negro league baseball players who played in Major League Baseball =

This List of Negro league baseball players who played in Major League Baseball is largely based on the research compiled by the Center for Negro League Baseball Research. The list includes those who played on major Negro league teams prior to integration (and any caliber Negro league team after integration) as well as in Major League Baseball. The list does not include Negro league players who only played in the minor leagues and White Hispanic players who played in both the Negro Leagues and MLB prior to full integration (ex. Pedro Dibut).

== Pre-integration players ==
Major League Baseball was segregated from 1887 through 1946. The integration of Major League Baseball happened at the beginning of the 1947 MLB season when Jackie Robinson played his first game for the Brooklyn Dodgers. By the 1950s, enough black talent had integrated into the formerly "white" leagues (both major and minor) that the Negro leagues themselves had become a minor league circuit.

Below is a list of 52 players who played for major Negro league teams up to 1950 and eventually saw playing time for a Major League team. Of these, nine have been inducted into the Baseball Hall of Fame. Upon the death of Willie Mays, Bill Greason is the sole surviving.

Key
^{†}	Elected to the Baseball Hall of Fame

Player	Negro league Team(s)	Negro league Year(s)	Major League Team(s)	Major League Year(s)	Notes
Jackie Robinson^{†}	Kansas City Monarchs	1945	Brooklyn Dodgers	1947–1956	First black player in MLB since 1884; Elected to the Baseball Hall of Fame; 1947 ML RoY, 1949 NL MVP; 6× NL All-Star, 1× NgL All-Star; Served in the US Army during WWII 1942–1944
Larry Doby^{†}	Newark Eagles	1942–1944,1946–1947	Cleveland Indians; Chicago White Sox; Detroit Tigers	1947–1955,1958; 1956–1957,1959; 1959	First black player for Cleveland Indians; Elected to the Baseball Hall of Fame; 7× AL All-Star, 1× NgL All-Star; Served in the US Navy during WWII 1944–1945
Hank Thompson	Kansas City Monarchs	1943,1946–1948	St. Louis Browns; New York Giants	1947; 1949–1956	First black player for St. Louis Browns and New York Giants; Served in the US Army during WWII 1944–1945
Willard Brown^{†}	Kansas City Monarchs	1935–1944,1946–1949	St. Louis Browns	1947	Elected to the Baseball Hall of Fame; 6× NgL All-Star; Served in the US Army during WWII 1944–1945
Dan Bankhead	Birmingham Black Barons; Memphis Red Sox	1940–1942,1944; 1946–1947	Brooklyn Dodgers	1947,1950–1951	3× NgL All-Star; Served in the U.S. Marine Corps during WWII 1943–1945
Roy Campanella^{†}	Wash/Balt Elite Giants	1937–1945	Brooklyn Dodgers	1948–1957	Elected to the Baseball Hall of Fame; 3× NL MVP; 8× NL All-Star, 3× NgL All-Star
Satchel Paige^{†}	Birmingham Black Barons; Cleveland Cubs; Pittsburgh Crawfords; St. Louis Stars; Newark Eagles; Kansas City Monarchs	1924–1955	Cleveland Indians; St. Louis Browns; Kansas City Athletics	1948–1949; 1951–1953; 1965	Elected to the Baseball Hall of Fame; 2× AL All-Star, 6× NgL All-Star
Minnie Miñoso^{†}	New York Cubans	1946–1948	Cleveland Indians; Chicago White Sox; St. Louis Cardinals; Washington Senators	1949,1951,1958–1959; 1951–57,60–61,64,76,80; 1962; 1963	First black player for Chicago White Sox; Elected to the Baseball Hall of Fame; 9× AL All-Star, 2× NgL All-Star
Don Newcombe	Newark Eagles	1944–45	Brooklyn/LA Dodgers; Cincinnati Reds; Cleveland Indians	1949–1951,1954–1958; 1958–1960; 1960	1949 NL RoY, 1956 ML Cy Young & NL MVP; 4× NL All-Star; Served in the US Navy during WWII 1943; Served in the US Army during Korean War 1952–1953
Monte Irvin^{†}	Newark Eagles	1937–1942,1945–1949	New York Giants; Chicago Cubs	1949–1955; 1956	Elected to the Baseball Hall of Fame; 1× NL All-Star, 4× NgL All-Star; Served in the US Army during WWII 1943–1945
Luke Easter	Homestead Grays	1947–1948	Cleveland Indians	1949–1954	1948 NgL All-Star; Served in the US Army during WWII 1942–1943
Sam Jethroe	Indianapolis ABCs; Cin/Cleveland Buckeyes	1938; 1942–1948	Boston Braves; Pittsburgh Pirates	1950–1952; 1954	First black player for Boston Braves; 1950 NL RoY; 4× NgL All-Star
Luis Márquez	New York Black Yankees; Baltimore Elite Giants; Homestead Grays	1945; 1946; 1946–1948	Boston Braves; Chicago Cubs; Pittsburgh Pirates	1951; 1954; 1954	2× NgL All-Star
Ray Noble	New York Cubans	1945–1950	New York Giants	1951–1953	
Artie Wilson	Birmingham Black Barons	1944–1948	New York Giants	1951	4× NgL All-Star
Harry Simpson	Philadelphia Stars	1946–1948	Cleveland Indians; Kansas City Athletics; New York Yankees; Chicago White Sox; Pittsburgh Pirates	1951–1953,1955; 1955–1957,1958–1959; 1957–1958; 1959; 1959	1× AL All-Star; Served in the US Army during WWII 1941–1945
Willie Mays^{†}	Birmingham Black Barons	1948–1950	NY/SF Giants; New York Mets	1951–1952,1954–1972; 1972–1973	Elected to the Baseball Hall of Fame; 1951 NL RoY, 2× NL MVP; 24× NL All-Star; Served in the US Army during Korean War 1952–1953
Sam Hairston	Birmingham Black Barons; Cin-Ind/Indianapolis Clowns	1944; 1945–1950	Chicago White Sox	1951	1× NgL All-Star
Bob Boyd	Memphis Red Sox	1946–1950	Chicago White Sox; Baltimore Orioles; Kansas City Athletics; Milwaukee Braves	1951,1953–1954; 1956–1960; 1961; 1961	3× NgL All-Star; Served in the US Army during WWII 1944–1946
Sam Jones	Cleveland Buckeyes	1947–1948	Cleveland Indians; Chicago Cubs; St. Louis Cardinals; San Francisco Giants; Detroit Tigers; Baltimore Orioles	1951–1952; 1955–1956; 1957–1958,1963; 1959–1961; 1962; 1964	2× NL All-Star; Served in the US Army during WWII 1943–1947
Héctor Rodríguez	New York Cubans	1944	Chicago White Sox	1952	
George Crowe	New York Black Yankees; New York Cubans	1947–1948; 1948–1949	Boston/Mil Braves; Cincinnati Reds; St. Louis Cardinals	1952–1953,1955; 1956–1958; 1959–1961	1× NL All-Star, 1× NgL All-Star; Served in the US Army during WWII 1944–1946
Buzz Clarkson	Pit/Tol/Tol-Ind Crawfords; Newark Eagles; Philadelphia Stars	1938–1940; 1940; 1942,1946,1949	Boston Braves	1952	2× NgL All-Star; Served in the US Army during WWII 1943–1945
Quincy Trouppe	St. Louis Stars; Detroit Wolves; Homestead Grays; Kansas City Monarchs; Chicago American Giants; Indianapolis ABC's; Cleveland Buckeyes; New York Cubans	1930–1931,1939; 1932; 1932; 1932,1934–1936; 1933,1935,1948; 1938–1939; 1944–1947; 1949	Cleveland Indians	1952	5× NgL All-Star
Joe Black	Baltimore Elite Giants	1943,1946–1950	Brooklyn Dodgers; Cincinnati Reds; Washington Senators	1952–1955; 1955–1956; 1957	1952 NL RoY; 3× NgL All-Star; Served in the US Army during WWII 1943–1945
Dave Pope	Homestead Grays	1946,1948	Cleveland Indians; Baltimore Orioles	1952,1954–1955,1956; 1955–1956	Served in the US Army during WWII 1943–1946
Sandy Amorós	New York Cubans	1950	Brooklyn/LA Dodgers; Detroit Tigers	1952,1954–1957,1959–1960; 1960	
Junior Gilliam	Baltimore Elite Giants	1946–1950	Brooklyn/LA Dodgers	1953–1966	1953 NL RoY; 2× NL All-Star, 3× NgL All-Star
Connie Johnson	Atlanta Black Crackers; Toledo-Ind Crawfords; Kansas City Monarchs	1940; 1940; 1940–1942,1946–1950	Chicago White Sox; Baltimore Orioles	1953,1955–1956; 1956–1958	2× NgL All-Star; Served in the US Army during WWII 1943–1945
Jim Pendleton	Chicago American Giants	1948	Milwaukee Braves; Pittsburgh Pirates; Cincinnati Reds; Houston Colt .45's	1953–1956; 1957–1958; 1959; 1962	
Dave Hoskins	Cincinnati Clowns; Chicago American Giants; Homestead Grays; Louisville Buckeyes	1942; 1943; 1944–1946; 1949	Cleveland Indians	1953–1954	1× NgL All-Star
Al Smith	Cleveland Buckeyes	1946–1948	Cleveland Indians; Chicago White Sox; Baltimore Orioles; Boston Red Sox	1953–1957, 1964; 1958–1962; 1963; 1964	3× AL All-Star
Bob Trice	Homestead Grays	1948–1950	Phil/KC Athletics	1953–1955	First black player for Philadelphia Athletics; Served in the US Navy during WWII 1944–1946
Ernie Banks^{†}	Kansas City Monarchs	1950,1953	Chicago Cubs	1953–1971	Elected to the Baseball Hall of Fame; First black player for Chicago Cubs; 2× NL MVP; 14× NL All-Star, 1× NgL All-Star; Served in the US Army during Korean War 1951–1953
Gene Baker	Kansas City Monarchs	1948–1950	Chicago Cubs; Pittsburgh Pirates	1953–1957; 1957–1958,1960-961	1× NL All-Star; Served in the US Navy during WWII 1943–1946
Curt Roberts	Kansas City Monarchs	1947–1950	Pittsburgh Pirates	1954–1956	First black player for Pittsburgh Pirates
Chuck Harmon (Note: Chuck Harmon played under alias of Charlie Fine for the Clowns so as not to violate his college basketball eligibility.)	Indianapolis Clowns	1947	Cincinnati Reds; St. Louis Cardinals; Philadelphia Phillies	1954–1956; 1956–1957; 1957	First black player for Cincinnati Reds; Served in the US Navy during WWII 1943–1945
Jose Santiago	New York Cubans	1947–1948	Cleveland Indians; Kansas City Athletics	1954–1955; 1956	
Charlie White	Philadelphia Stars	1950	Milwaukee Braves	1954–1955	1× NgL All-Star
Jay Heard	Birmingham Black Barons; Memphis Red Sox; Houston/NO Eagles	1945–1949; 1949; 1949–1951	Baltimore Orioles	1954	1× NgL All-Star
Bill Greason	Birmingham Black Barons	1948–1951	St. Louis Cardinals	1954	1× NgL All-Star; Served in the US Marine Corp during WWII 1943–1945 and the Korean War 1951–1952
Elston Howard	Kansas City Monarchs	1948–1950	New York Yankees; Boston Red Sox	1955–1967; 1967–1968	First black player for New York Yankees; 1963 AL MVP; 12× AL All-Star; Served in the US Army during Korean War 1951–1952
Bob Thurman	Homestead Grays; Kansas City Monarchs	1946–1948; 1949	Cincinnati Reds	1955–1959	Served in the US Army during WWII 1942–1945
Roberto Vargas	Chicago American Giants	1948	Milwaukee Braves	1955	1× NgL All-Star
Lino Donoso	New York Cubans	1947	Pittsburgh Pirates	1955–1956	
Milt Smith	Philadelphia Stars; Kansas City Monarchs	1949,1950–1951; 1950	Cincinnati Reds	1955	1× NgL All-Star
Webbo Clarke	Cleveland Buckeyes; Memphis Red Sox	1946–1948; 1950	Washington Senators	1955	5× NgL All-Star
Pat Scantlebury	New York Cubans	1944–1950	Cincinnati Reds	1956	3× NgL All-Star
Charlie Peete (Note: Charlie Peete and his family died in a plane crash in 1957 when he was 27.)	Indianapolis Clowns	1950	St. Louis Cardinals	1956	Served in the US Army during Korean War 1952–1953
Joe Caffie	Cleveland Buckeyes	1950	Cleveland Indians	1956–1957	
Frank Barnes	Kansas City Monarchs	1949–1950	St. Louis Cardinals	1957–1958,1960	
Bob Wilson	Newark/Houston Eagles	1947–1949	Los Angeles Dodgers	1958	1× NgL All-Star

== Post-integration players ==
An additional 35 or so players played on a Negro league team after 1950. A select few were All-Stars and one was inducted into the Hall of Fame:

Player	Negro league Team(s)	Negro league Year(s)	Major League Team(s)	Major League Year(s)	Notes
Henry Aaron^{†}	Indianapolis Clowns	1952	Milwaukee/Atlanta Braves; Milwaukee Brewers	1954–1974; 1974–1976	Elected to the Baseball Hall of Fame; 1957 NL MVP; 25× NL All-Star; Broke Babe Ruth's career home run record in 1973
George Altman	Kansas City Monarchs	1955	Chicago Cubs; St. Louis Cardinals; New York Mets	1959–1962, 1965–1967; 1963; 1964	3× NL All-Star
Donn Clendenon	Atlanta Black Crackers	1952–1956	Pittsburgh Pirates; Montreal Expos; New York Mets; St. Louis Cardinals	1961–1968; 1969; 1969–1971; 1972	World Series MVP for the 1969 "Miracle Mets".
Charlie Neal	Atlanta Black Crackers	1947–1959	Brooklyn/Los Angeles Dodgers; New York Mets; Cincinnati Reds	1956–1961; 1962–1963; 1963	3× NL All-Star
Blue Moon Odom	Raleigh Tigers	1962	Kansas City/Oakland Athletics; Cleveland Indians; Atlanta Braves; Chicago White Sox	1964–1975; 1975; 1975; 1976	2× AL All-Star
Maury Wills	Raleigh Tigers	1950	Los Angeles Dodgers; Pittsburgh Pirates; Montreal Expos	1959–1966, 1969–1972; 1967–1968; 1969	1962 NL MVP; 7× AL All-Star; Broke Ty Cobb's single season stolen base record in 1962
Willie Smith	Birmingham Black Barons	1958-1959	Detroit Tigers; Los Angeles Angels; Cleveland Indians; Chicago Cubs; Cincinnati Reds	1963; 1964–1966; 1967–1968; 1968–1970; 1971	2x NgL All-Star; 2-way player; Played in Japan for Nankai Hawks 1972-73

== See also ==
- List of starting black NFL quarterbacks
- List of black NHL players
