= Mako Oliveras =

Puerto Rican baseball player

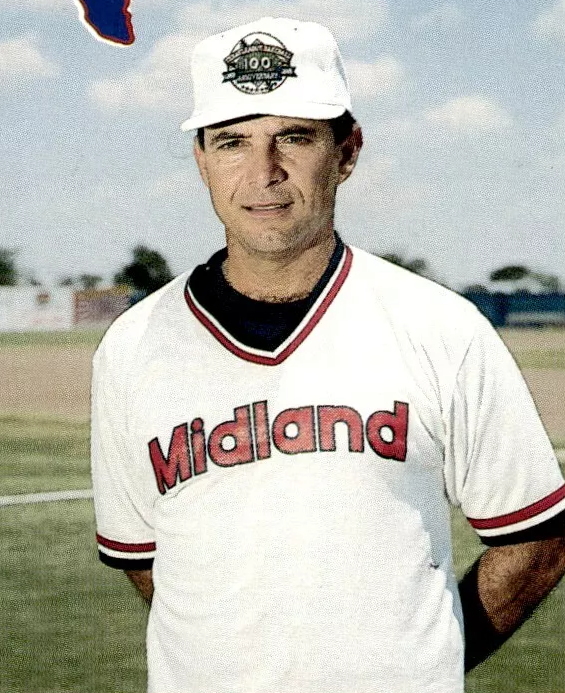
- Oliveras with the Midland Angels c. 1988

Indios de Mayagüez
- Manager
- Born: September 10, 1946 (age 80); Santurce, San Juan, Puerto Rico
- Bats: Right Throws: Right
- Stats at Baseball Reference

Max "Mako" Oliveras Gutiérrez (born September 10, 1946) is a Puerto Rican former Minor League Baseball player who later managed in the minors for several teams. He joined the Alpha chapter of Phi Sigma Alpha fraternity in 1964.

Oliveras played seven seasons in the minor leagues. He was also a coach in the major leagues for the California Angels and the Chicago Cubs.

In May 1986, Oliveras took over as manager of the independent Miami Marlins after Fred Hatfield was fired. He had been "widely praised for his work in the Puerto Rican Winter League", according to Baseball America's 1987 Statistics Report, and the Marlins won the most games they had in eight years.

The next year, Oliveras was hired by the California Angels organization and he managed the Midland Angels from 1987 to 1989. He moved up to Triple-A, managing the Edmonton Trappers from 1990 to 1992 and the Vancouver Canadians in 1993. After that, he became a coach for the Angels in 1994 and was a member of the Chicago Cubs staff from 1995 to 1997.

In 1998, he managed the Kinston Indians. He took over as manager of the Orlando Rays in 2002, then moved down to the Charleston RiverDogs in 2003, and then back up to the Bakersfield Blaze in 2004. In 2005 and 2006, he was a coach for the Montgomery Biscuits under manager Charlie Montoyo.

He later managed the Binghamton Mets from 2007 to 2009.

In between, Oliveras played for the Petroleros de Poza Rica of the Mexican League (LMB) and led the Cangrejeros de Santurce club to Caribbean Series championships in the 1993 and 2000 tournaments.

In December 2009, Oliveras was hired by the Diablos Rojos del México as the team's new manager. Oliveras managed the Diablos for two seasons, 2010 and 2011, where the team had a 124–80 record, qualifying to the playoffs in both seasons and reaching the LMB Championship Series in 2011, losing to the Tigres de Quintana Roo.

He coached the Indios de Mayagüez to win the 2022-2023 Puerto Rican Winter League. He coached the Indios in the 2023 Caribbean Series and became the coach with the most wins (28) in the history of the Caribbean Series.
