= Bill Kennedy (baseball, born 1921) =

American baseball player (1921–1983)

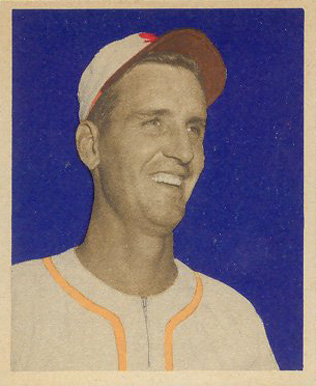
- Pitcher
- Born: March 14, 1921; Carnesville, Georgia, U.S.
- Died: April 9, 1983 (aged 62); Seattle, Washington, U.S.
- Batted: Left Threw: Left

MLB debut
- April 26, 1948, for the Cleveland Indians

Last MLB appearance
- September 29, 1957, for the Cincinnati Redlegs

MLB statistics
- Win–loss record: 15–28
- Earned run average: 4.73
- Strikeouts: 256
- Stats at Baseball Reference

Teams
- Cleveland Indians (1948); St. Louis Browns (1948–1951); Chicago White Sox (1952); Boston Red Sox (1953); Cincinnati Redlegs (1956–1957)

William Aulton Kennedy (March 14, 1921 – April 9, 1983), nicknamed "Lefty", was an American pitcher for the Cleveland Indians, St. Louis Browns, Chicago White Sox, Boston Red Sox and Cincinnati Redlegs of Major League Baseball (MLB) between 1948 and 1957.

== Biography ==
Kennedy was born in Carnesville, Georgia. Signed before the 1939 season as an amateur free agent by the New York Yankees, Kennedy pitched three seasons in the low minors without much distinction before missing the 1943–45 seasons while serving in the U.S. Army during World War II.

Returning to baseball in 1946, Kennedy put together one of the greatest pitching seasons in minor league history for the Rocky Mount Rocks in the Class-D Coastal Plain League. The 25-year-old went 28–3 with a 1.03 ERA over 41 games, striking out a staggering 456 batters in 280.0 innings—the second-highest single-season strikeout total in professional baseball history.

Following the season he was sent to the Boston Red Sox and he spent 1947 with Boston's affiliate at Class-A Scranton. Though he struck out just 113 batters, he followed up his historic campaign with a 15-2 campaign record and a 2.62 ERA. After being left unprotected that winter, the Cleveland Indians selected him in the Rule 5 Draft, which led him breaking camp with the Cleveland Indians to open the 1948 season, making his MLB debut on April 26 at the age of 27. However, after just six ineffective outings he was traded to the St. Louis Browns for pitcher Sam Zoldak, missing out an opportunity to play in the World Series, which the Indians won.

After pitching most of 1948 and all of 1949 in St. Louis, he spent nearly all of 1950 and part of 1951 in the minors. In March 1952, Kennedy was purchased by the Chicago White Sox, ending his four-year tenure with the Browns at a 12–24 record with a 4.84 ERA. Pitching on a winning team, he went on to record the best season of his career working almost exclusively in relief for the first time in his career. Kennedy notched a career-best 2.80 ERA over 70.2 innings, notching five saves and leading the American League in games pitched with 47.

Despite his success in Chicago, that winter he was packaged with pitcher Marv Grissom in a trade to the Boston Red Sox for shortstop Vern Stephens. Alas, the trade failed to work out for either side; Stephens and Grissom were both dealt again by mid-season, and Kennedy was demoted to the minors, where he stayed for the remainder of the 1953 season and all of 1954 and '55.

In 1955 Kennedy moved to the Pacific Coast League, pitching for the Seattle Rainiers. Successful seasons in 1956 and '57 led to call-ups from the Cincinnati Reds, but he was ineffective, appearing in a combined nine MLB games over those two seasons and posting a 7.98 ERA. He made his last MLB appearance on September 29, 1957, at the age of 36.

He pitched three more seasons in the PCL before retiring following the 1960 season at the age of 39. In eight major league seasons, he had a 15–28 win–loss record, 172 games pitched (45 starts), 11 saves, 256 strikeouts and a 4.73 earned run average (ERA). He won an additional 149 games in 15 seasons in the minors.

Kennedy died in Seattle of lung cancer at the age of 62.

== See also ==
- 1955 Caribbean Series
