= Héctor Rodríguez (third baseman) =

Cuban baseball player (1920–2003)

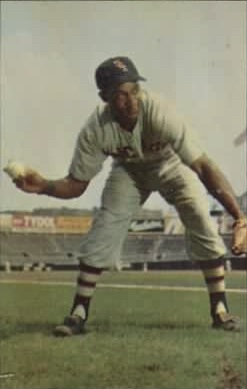
- Third baseman
- Born: June 13, 1920; Alquízar, Cuba
- Died: September 1, 2003 (aged 83); Cancún, Quintana Roo, Mexico
- Batted: Right Threw: Right

Professional debut
- NgL: 1944, for the New York Cubans
- MLB: April 15, 1952, for the Chicago White Sox

Last MLB appearance
- September 16, 1952, for the Chicago White Sox

MLB statistics
- Batting average: .269
- Home runs: 1
- Runs batted in: 52
- Stolen bases: 13
- Stats at Baseball Reference

Teams
- Negro leagues: New York Cubans (1944); Major League Baseball: Chicago White Sox (1952)

Member of the Caribbean

Baseball Hall of Fame
- Induction: 1998

Héctor Antonio Rodríguez Ordeñana (June 13, 1920 – September 1, 2003) was a Cuban Major League Baseball third baseman for one season (1952) with the Chicago White Sox.

A native of Alquízar, Cuba, Rodríguez played in the Negro leagues with the New York Cubans in 1939 and 1944, and in the Mexican League, in 1945–1946 prior to the integration of organized baseball.

== Professional career ==
Before the 1951 season, Rodríguez was acquired by the Brooklyn Dodgers from the Tuneros de San Luis Potosí of the Mexican League. He was assigned to Brooklyn's farm club, the Montreal Royals, where he batted .302. On December 6 of that same year he was traded by the Dodgers to the Chicago White Sox for first baseman Rocky Nelson.

Rodríguez was Chicago's regular third baseman during the 1952 season. He appeared in 124 games for the 81–73 White Sox and hit .265 with 1 home run and 40 runs batted in. He drew 47 walks and was hit by a pitch 3 times, raising his on-base percentage to .346. He stole 7 bases, scored 55 runs, and struck out just 22 times in 407 at bats, making him the seventh-toughest to strike out in the American League (once per every 18.5 at bats).

Defensively, his .959 fielding percentage was just above the league average for third basemen. Rodríguez went back to the minor leagues in 1953, and on October 8 of that year was traded to the Toronto Maple Leafs of the International League for pitcher Don Johnson.

Rodríguez died at the age of 83 in Cancún, Quintana Roo, Mexico.

== See also ==
- List of Negro league baseball players who played in Major League Baseball
