= Mike Cook (baseball) =

American baseball player (born 1963)

- Relief pitcher
- Born: September 14, 1963 (age 63); Charleston, South Carolina, U.S.
- Batted: Right Threw: Right

MLB debut
- July 1, 1986, for the California Angels

Last MLB appearance
- October 3, 1993, for the Baltimore Orioles

MLB statistics
- Win–loss record: 1–6
- Earned run average: 5.55
- Strikeouts: 53
- Stats at Baseball Reference

Teams
- California Angels (1986–1988); Minnesota Twins (1989); Baltimore Orioles (1993)

Michael Horace Cook (born August 14, 1963) is an American former professional baseball player who played five seasons for the California Angels, Minnesota Twins, and Baltimore Orioles of Major League Baseball (MLB). He struck out John Cangelosi looking for his first MLB strikeout. Micheal Cook also became a science teacher at Clearwater Fundamental Middle School in Pinellas County
