= George Crowe =

American baseball player (1921–2011)

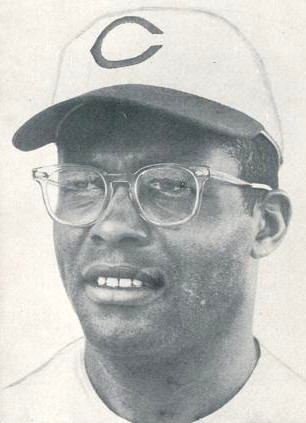
- First baseman
- Born: March 22, 1921; Whiteland, Indiana, U.S.
- Died: January 18, 2011 (aged 89); Rancho Cordova, California, U.S.
- Batted: Left Threw: Left

Professional debut
- NgL: 1947, for the New York Black Yankees
- MLB: April 16, 1952, for the Boston Braves

Last MLB appearance
- April 30, 1961, for the St. Louis Cardinals

MLB (Note: On December 16, 2020, Major League Baseball declared the Negro leagues, from the span of 1920–1948, to be a "Major League". Crowe's statistics reflect his time in the Negro leagues from 1947-1948.) statistics
- Batting average: .275
- Home runs: 86
- Runs batted in: 332
- Stats at Baseball Reference

Teams
- Negro leagues: New York Black Yankees (1947–1948); New York Cubans (1948–1949); Major League Baseball: Boston / Milwaukee Braves (1952–1953, 1955); Cincinnati Redlegs (1956–1958); St. Louis Cardinals (1959–1961)

Career highlights and awards
- NgL All-Star (1948); Caribbean Series title (1955); All-Star (1958)
Basketball career
Personal information
Listed height	6 ft 2 in (1.88 m)
Listed weight	206 lb (93 kg)
Career information
High school	Franklin Senior (Franklin, Indiana)
College	Indianapolis (1940–1943)
Playing career	1948–1953
Position	Forward / center
Career history
1948–1949	Dayton Rens
1949–1950; 1952–1953	New York Harlem Yankees / Glens Falls-Saratoga

George Daniel Crowe (March 22, 1921 – January 18, 2011) was an American professional baseball player who appeared in 702 games in the major leagues as a first baseman and pinch hitter between 1952 and 1961. Before joining minor league baseball in 1949, Crowe played with the Negro National League's (Rochester) New York Black Yankees in 1947 and 1948, and he also played professional basketball.

Born in Whiteland, Indiana, Crowe graduated from nearby Franklin High School in 1939. He led the Franklin Grizzly Cubs to a notable state runner-up finish in 1939 in the IHSAA Boys Basketball Tournament. He attended college at Indiana Central College (now the University of Indianapolis), where he was a member of the Class of 1943. He was the first Indiana "Mr. Basketball" and served in the United States Army during World War II.

== Baseball career ==
=== MLB first baseman ===
Crowe batted and threw left-handed, stood 6 feet 2 inches (1.88 m) tall and weighed 210 pounds (95 kg). In Major League Baseball, he played for the Boston / Milwaukee Braves (1952–1953; 1955), Cincinnati Redlegs (1956–1958) and St. Louis Cardinals (1959–1961), all of the National League. He hit 31 home runs for Cincinnati in 1957, filling in most of the season for the injured Ted Kluszewski.

He was selected to the 1958 NL All-Star squad but did not play in the July 8 midsummer classic, won by the rival American League 4–3 at Baltimore's Memorial Stadium. The previous season, Cincinnati fans had been involved in a ballot stuffing campaign to put all of the team's regulars in the Senior Circuit's starting lineup for the 1957 Major League Baseball All-Star Game. Ed Bailey, Johnny Temple, Roy McMillan, Don Hoak, Frank Robinson, Gus Bell and Wally Post were voted into the lineup, but Crowe was beaten out in the tally by future Cardinal teammate Stan Musial.

=== Minor and winter league baseball ===
Crowe was 28 years old when he moved from the Negro leagues to "Organized Baseball", as it slowly began the process of racial integration in the late 1940s.

He was a prodigious minor league batsman, never hitting below .334 until he was a 40-year-old player-coach in 1961, his final year as an active player. In 1950, Crowe played for the Hartford Chiefs of the Class A Eastern League, where he won the batting title (.353) and led the circuit in hits and runs scored. He twice led the Triple-A American Association in runs batted in, with 119 (1951) and 128 (1954).

Crowe also played winter ball with the Santurce Crabbers of the Puerto Rico Professional Baseball League during the 1954–55 season, where, as a teammate of Willie Mays, Roberto Clemente, Buster Clarkson and Bob Thurman, Crowe formed part of the Escuadron Del Panico (the "Panic Squadron") that led the Crabbers to the league and Caribbean World Series championships.

=== Left-handed second baseman ===
Crowe played two-thirds of an inning in one game as a second baseman on June 14, 1958, switching fielding positions with Johnny Temple. Still wearing his over-sized first baseman's mitt—Crowe threw left-handed and playing any infield position other than first base is rare for a southpaw—he completed a double play against the batter, pitcher John Briggs of the Chicago Cubs. Although the Cubs won the contest, 4–3, Chicago skipper Bob Scheffing played the game under protest because Crowe had used a non-standard infielder's glove. Scheffing's protest led to a rule change mandating that first basemen moving to a different defensive position must exchange their mitt for a regulation fielder's glove.

=== MLB totals and milestones ===
In 702 games over nine MLB seasons, Crowe posted a .270 batting average (467-for-1,727) with 215 runs, 70 doubles, 12 triples, 81 home runs and 299 RBI. He recorded a .990 fielding percentage as a first baseman. Crowe set a record (later broken by Jerry Lynch and subsequently by Cliff Johnson) for most pinch-hit home runs in major league baseball history with 14.

== Basketball career ==
Crowe played basketball for the barnstorming New York Renaissance Big Five (aka "Rens"). In 1947 Crowe played basketball for the integrated Los Angeles Red Devils, a team that also included future Brooklyn Dodgers' star Jackie Robinson. Following the disbanding of the Red Devils, Crowe would return to the Renaissance for the 1947–48 season, competing in the final World Professional Basketball Tournament ever held in 1948, with Crowe being named a member of the tournament's final All-Tournament Second Team for his work with the Rens up until their final match in the championship round against the National Basketball League's Minneapolis Lakers, who are now the National Basketball Association's Los Angeles Lakers.

Crowe played professional basketball in the National Basketball League (NBL) and the American Basketball League (ABL). He first played for the Dayton Rens of the NBL during the 1948–49 season and averaged 10.9 points per game. Crowe moved to the New York Harlem Yankees of the ABL during the 1949–50 season and averaged 13.6 points per game. He returned to the Yankees as they were renamed to the Glens Falls-Saratoga for the 1952–53 season and he averaged 12.3 points per game. Crowe briefly served as the team's head coach during the season and recorded three losses.

== Family ==
He was the younger brother of Ray Crowe, who was the head basketball coach of the Crispus Attucks High School teams that won two consecutive Indiana state titles in 1954–55 and 1955–56, led by Oscar Robertson.

== See also ==
- List of Negro league baseball players who played in Major League Baseball
