= José Muñoz (infielder) =

American baseball player (born 1967)

Jose Munoz
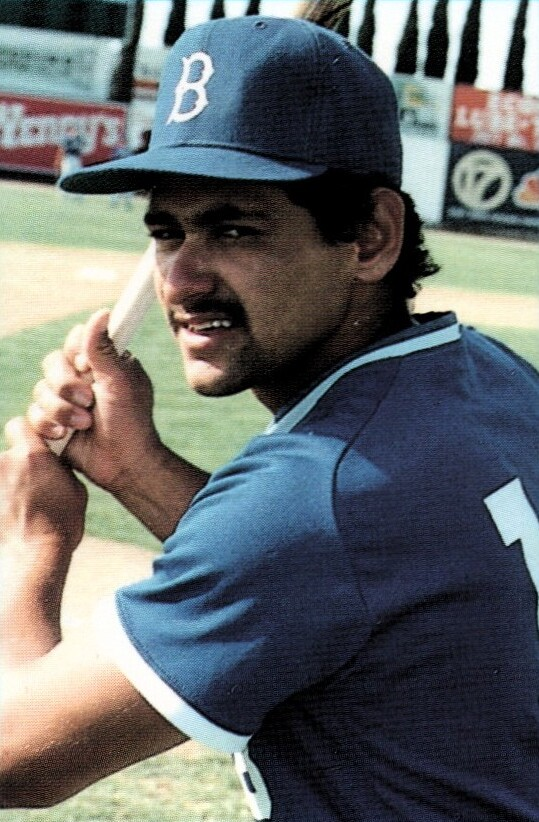
- Muñoz with the Bakersfield Dodgers in 1988
- Infielder
- Born: November 11, 1967 (age 58); Chicago, Illinois
- Batted: Switch Threw: Right

MLB debut
- April 7, 1996, for the Chicago White Sox

Last MLB appearance
- May 31, 1996, for the Chicago White Sox

MLB statistics
- Batting average: .259
- Home runs: 0
- Runs batted in: 1

CPBL statistics
- Batting average: .305
- Home runs: 0
- Runs batted in: 10
- Stats at Baseball Reference

Teams
- Chicago White Sox (1996); Brother Elephants (1998)

Jose Luis Munoz (born November 11, 1967) is a retired Major League Baseball infielder. He played during one season at the major league level for the Chicago White Sox. He was drafted by the Los Angeles Dodgers in the 20th round of the 1987 amateur draft. Munoz played his first professional season with their Rookie league Gulf Coast Dodgers in 1987, and split his last season with the Chicago White Sox and their Triple-A affiliate, the Nashville Sounds, in 1996.
