= Guillermo Angulo =

Puerto Rican baseball player

- First baseman
- Born: June 25, 1902; Carolina, Puerto Rico
- Died: August 22, 1979 (aged 77); Carolina, Puerto Rico

Negro league baseball debut
- 1929, for the Cuban Stars (East)

Last appearance
- 1929, for the Cuban Stars (East)

Teams
- Cuban Stars (East) (1929)

Guillermo Angulo Luciano (June 25, 1902 – August 22, 1979) was a Puerto Rican first baseman in the Negro leagues.

A native of Carolina, Puerto Rico, Angulo played for the Cuban Stars (East) in 1929. In his three recorded games, he posted one hit in 13 plate appearances. Angulo died in his hometown of Carolina in 1979 at age 77. He was buried at Cementerio Municipal de Carolina.
