= George Wilson (outfielder) =

American baseball player (1924–1974)

- Outfielder
- Born: August 30, 1924; Cherryville, North Carolina, U.S.
- Died: October 29, 1974 (aged 50); Kings Mountain, North Carolina, U.S.
- Batted: Left Threw: Right

Professional debut
- MLB: April 15, 1952, for the Chicago White Sox
- NPB: 1963, for the Nishitetsu Lions

Last appearance
- MLB: September 30, 1956, for the New York Yankees
- NPB: 1964, for the Nishitetsu Lions

MLB statistics
- Batting average: .191
- Home runs: 3
- Runs batted in: 19

NPB statistics
- Batting average: .258
- Home runs: 27
- Runs batted in: 107
- Stats at Baseball Reference

Teams
- Chicago White Sox (1952); New York Giants (1952–1953, 1956); New York Yankees (1956); Nishitetsu Lions (1963–1964)

Career highlights and awards
- World Series champion (1956); 1955 Caribbean Series All-Star team

George Washington Wilson (August 30, 1924 – October 29, 1974), nicknamed "Teddy", was an American outfielder in Major League Baseball. Listed at 6 feet 1 inch (1.85 m) and 185 pounds (84 kg), he batted left handed and threw right handed.

He attended Cherryville High School in Cherryville, North Carolina before starting his professional career. Basically a corner outfielder, Wilson was most often used as a pinch hitter during his time in the major league. He played for the Chicago White Sox, New York Giants and New York Yankees in parts of three seasons spanning 1952–1956. In a three-season MLB career, he hit .191 with three home runs and 19 runs batted in in 145 games played.

A member of the 1956 World Series champion Yankees, he also played in Japan from 1963 to 1964 for the Nishitetsu Lions. Overall, his professional career spanned 23 seasons, beginning in 1942 in the minor leagues and ending in 1964 with the Lions. He also had two productive seasons for the Navegantes del Magallanes of the Venezuela Winter League and played in the 1955 Caribbean Series.
