= Cangrejeros de Santurce (baseball) =

Professional baseball team in San Juan, Puerto Rico

Logo
Cap insignia

Information
- League: Roberto Clemente Professional Baseball League
- Location: Santurce, San Juan, Puerto Rico
- Ballpark: Hiram Bithorn Stadium
- Founded: 1939; 87 years ago
- Caribbean Series championships: 5 (1951, 1953, 1955, 1993, 2000)
- Interamerican Series championships: 1 (1962)
- League championships: 17 (1950-51, 1952-53, 1954-55, 1958-59, 1961-62, 1964-65, 1966-67, 1970-71, 1972-73, 1990-91, 1992-93, 1999-00, 2014-15, 2015-16, 2018-19, 2019-20, 2025-26)
- Former ballpark(s): Juan Ramón Loubriel Stadium; Estadio Sixto Escobar
- Colors: Royal blue, white and gray
- Ownership: Impulse Sports and Entertainment, Inc.
- President: Carlos Iguina Oharriz
- Manager: Omar López
- Website: cangrejeros.net (in Spanish)

Cangrejeros de Santurce (pronounced [kaŋɡɾeˈxeɾos ðe sanˈtuɾse]; "Santurce Crabbers") are a professional baseball team based in Santurce, the largest barrio of San Juan, Puerto Rico. The franchise joined the Liga de Béisbol Profesional Roberto Clemente when it was the semi-professional Liga de Béisbol Semi-Profesional de Puerto Rico. Having played for over 80 years, the Cangrejeros have won seventeen national titles and five Caribbean Series. With over 2000 victories, the Cangrejeros have won the most games in the history of Puerto Rican professional baseball. The 1954–55 Cangrejeros, nicknamed Panic Squad, was the team's most notable roster, with a lineup that included hall of famers Roberto Clemente and Willie Mays. This version of the Cangrejeros won the National and Caribbean championships by sweeping their respective series.

Cangrejeros most recently played its home games at Hiram Bithorn Stadium, in the municipality of San Juan. For several years they shared this field with the Senadores de San Juan (also known temporally as the San Juan Metros). A sports rivalry has always existed between both teams, leading to the creation of the "City Championship", which was a season-long series that gave the team with the most wins the aforementioned title. During the 2003–04 season they also shared the stadium with the Montreal Expos before they were relocated to Washington, D.C., and became the Nationals. Previous home fields include the Sixto Escobar Stadium near Old San Juan, as well as the Juan Ramón Loubriel Stadium in Bayamón. The team's official radio station in the metropolitan area was WIPR (AM), on the 940 AM frequency.

== Creation and early years ==
Pedrín Zorilla, an amateur baseball player and then executive in Shell Oil's branch in Puerto Rico, established a baseball team at Santurce in the 1930s. A franchise was soon created and headquarters were located at Parada 20, Heriberto Ramírez de Arellano was responsible for its title, naming it after the Cangrejo Arriba and Cangrejo Abajo sectors of Condado and Loíza Street, where some players lived. Zorilla led a board composed of Ramírez de Arellano, Rafael Muñiz, Mike Pasarell, Héctor Nevares, Toño Palerm among others, which oversaw fund raising and operation. Panchicu Toste established contact with several local business, which promoted the team and managed ticket sales. The franchise received some opposition from the staff of the Senadores de San Juan, the municipality's main team at the time. The first uniforms of the Cangrejeros were bought blank, and the numbers and names of the players were sewed on for free by the mother of former general manager and sportswriter Carlos Pieve, who was a baseball fanatic. Following these efforts, the Cangrejeros joined the Liga de Béisbol Semi-Profesional de Puerto Rico for the 1939–40 season, one year after its foundation and sharing Estadio del Escambrón with the Senadores de San Juan. The team's lineup included Agustín Daviu, the first Puerto Rican to play organized baseball in the United States, and Luis Raúl Cabrera, both from Ponce. The rest of the local starters were Oscar Mangual, Ramón Concepción, Guillermo Angulo and Fellito Concepción. The league's rules allowed the inclusion of three foreign reinforcements, Zorilla contracted Negro leaguers Billy Byrd, Josh Gibson and Dick Seay to fill these spaces. Seay served as player-manager in the early part of this season, leaving the office to Gibson once he arrived until he abandoned the team to play in Venezuela before the season was over. The Cangrejeros made their debut on October 1, 1939, trading victories with Aguadilla in a doubleheader.

Another doubleheader was played against San Juan in October, with the teams trading victories again. The rivalry between the Cangrejeros and Senadores became known as the "City Championship", a term coined by Zorilla as a publicity stunt, with San Juan winning the first banner of this matchup. However, the team suffered a 23–0 loss to Guayama in November, which marked the worst defeat by any Santurce-based team in 60 years. Consequently, the Cangrejeros were called a "soft ball team" by the media, a pattern that continued throughout its early years. The Cangrejeros finished the season's first half in the sixth place, tying Aguadilla fourth during the second half. The team concluded its first season by defeating San Juan in two consecutive games, forcing the Senadores to play more games to secure the pennant. The team's home stadium was renamed Estadio Sixto Escobar after Sixto Escobar, Puerto Rico's first boxing champion. After an average first season, Cabrera soon became the Cangrejero's franchise player, conserving this status throughout the 1940s. In 1940–41, the Cangrejeros improved their performance. With the loss of Gibson, the team had signed Efraín Merced, Georgie Calderón, Raymond Brown and obtained Pedro Jaime Reyes in a trade for Concepción. The team had a weak start, trading victories in a double-header against San Juan before finishing last during the first half of the season, drastically improving to win the second half and earn a spot in the championship series. This was the first time that the Cangrejeros won the "City Championship" banner, winning all games against San Juan during the second half. The team finished this half with a record of 11 wins and 3 losses, gaining victories over the Grises de Humacao, Caguas, Mayaguez and Guayama. In the championship series, the Cangrejeros were matched against the Criollos de Caguas, losing in seven games. Cabrera won the LBSPR's Most Valuable Player Award. In 1941–42, the Cangrejeros lost several close games, being unable to match Ponce, the team that won both halves led by Francisco Coimbre. Gibson rejoined the team, hitting .480 to win the MVP award. The Marín Rum Company became the team's first sponsor, which earned the team a nickname, "Santurce-Marín" during the early 1940s.

== World War II and first Caribbean Series title ==
During the Second World War, several players were drafted into military service. The league cut the number of teams by half and no foreign reinforcements played for three years. In 1942–43, Caguas lost its franchise and Santurce signed some of its players, including Luis Olmo, Sammy Céspedes and Manolo García. The Cangrejeros won the first half and advanced to the finals, but lost the series to the Leones de Ponce. In this season, Olmo was named Co-MVP along Coimbre. Ponce went on to win the following two championships with the Cangrejeros finishing in the second place, Félix Andrade and Alfonso Gerard won Rookie of the Year awards for Santurce, while Tetelo Vargas won the league's batting title in 1943–44. In 1945–46, the team had its worst season up to that point, finishing last in the league. However, Víctor Cruz became the team's third straight Rookie of the Year. Gibson did not a hit a single home run throughout the season, experiencing an emotional breakdown that convinced Zorilla to send him back to Pittsburg. Vargas was the team's best hitter, while his former teammate in Guayama's amateur circuit, Perucho Cepeda, joined the Cangrejeros. In 1946–47, Santurce was managed by Clarence Palm, finishing fourth in the league's standing. Willard Brown joined the team during that season, winning the batting title. Guigo Otero took over the office of vice-president. The Cangrejeros finished in the third place in 1947–48, despite signing Satchel Paige and Rubén Gómez and Brown winning the league's triple-crown. The team tied Mayagüez for the first half's lead, but the Indios were declared winners due to the leading the individual series. In 1948–49, the LBPPR established a new format, where the top three teams from an 80-game season would advance to the playoffs. The Cangrejeros tied Ponce in the second place, eliminating them in the semifinals. However, they lost the finals series against Mayagüez. The team recorded the best assistance in the league with 4,337 followers per game for a total of 173,466. In 1949–50, the Cangrejeros once again tied with Ponce in the second position, being eliminated in the semifinals against the Indios. Brown won its second triple crown. The team was sponsored by TEK Deluxe Toothbrushes. For the 1950–51 season, Zorilla signed George Scales to manage the team and contracted new imports. The team won its first pennant after José "Pepe" Lucas hit a home run that became known as El Pepelucazo. The Cangrejeros went on to win the "City Championship", subsequently defeating the Senadores in all of their semifinal games. The team defeated the Criollos in a seven-game series, winning Santurce's first LBPPR championship and advancing to the newly created Caribbean Series. In their first international competition, the Cangrejeros were reinforced with Olmo who had returned to Caguas, Roberto Vargas and José Santiago among others, winning the first Caribbean title for Puerto Rico. Olmo was selected the series' MVP.

In 1951–52, Santurce finished third, winning 16 and losing 4 to finish the regular season. In the semifinals they defeated Caguas in all of the semifinal games, losing the finals to San Juan. Gómez was selected the league's MVP. In 1952–53, the Cangrejeros employed Buster Clarkson as the player-manager. This season marked Roberto Clemente's debut in the league after being signed by Zorilla. The team advanced to the playoffs, where they eliminated the Leones in three games. The finals were against the Senadores, with Santurce winning its second championship in a six-game series. The Cangrejeros went on to win their second Caribbean Series title, with a final record of 5–1. In the 1953–54 season, the Cangrejeros finished last in the standing, but Clemente and Gómez recorded solid performances. The following season, Zorilla and Otero asked permission to the New York Giants and managed to secure a contract for MLB National League MVP Willie Mays, who played centerfield and went on to win the league's MVP and batting title. Other imports included Clarkson, Bob Thurman and George Crowe. After the first month of the season, the team was in the fourth place of the league's standing with a negative record, before winning straight games against the Senadores and Criollos. Despite this change, the team made two releases to contract three reinforcement players, but lost one due to an MLB rule that prohibited the participation of five players from the same team in the winter leagues. On this year's All-Star game, Clemente hit two home runs to give the North team, composed of players from Santurce and San Juan, a victory over the South team. On October 31, 1954, Gómez pitched the league's first shutout, he finished with a record of 13-4 and won the "City Championship" and Caribbean Series title for Santurce. After sweeping their series, the team did not sign any reinforcement prior to the Caribbean Series, being the first time that a team had done so. Five players were included in the event's All-Star lineup, Don Zimmer carried the MVP and the Cangrejeros received a special trophy for winning three Caribbean championships. This version of the Cangrejeros was nicknamed El Escuadrón del Pánico by local newspapers. The team was received by a multitude and they were invited to La Fortaleza. The Cangrejeros signed seven new players for the 1955–56 season, including Orlando Cepeda, José Pagán and Juan Pizarro. They led the league throughout the regular season, winning that phase's title and advanced to the playoffs. Cepeda hit his first home run on October 30, 1955, in a 16-inning loss against the Leones. Despite this success, the team struggled to attract fans, a problem that affected the league for some years with the emergence of television. The other team to advance to the final series was the Criollos, who went on to win after falling behind 1–2.

In 1956–57, Zorilla sold the team to Ramón Cuevas. Clemente was traded to Caguas along Pizarro and Ronnie Samford. Gómez was the team's only MLB pitcher during this season. Santurce went on to win the league's pennant, winning ten straight games to close the regular season. In the final series, the Cangrejeros lost to Mayaguez 1–4. In 1957–58, the team won its fourth consecutive pennant recovering from a slow first-half start. The team was forced to adjust its schedule to comply with the growing popularity of horse races, product of El Comandante hippodrome opening that year. Cepeda lead the league in RBIs and was tied with Victor Pellot in home runs. The Cangrejeros lost the final to Caguas, in a series where Clemente and Pizarro dominated their former teammates. In the 1958–59 season, Zorilla returned to serve as the team's general manager and the team stopped airing their games to deal with attendance issues. San Juan and Santurce competed for the pennant throughout the season, but the Senadores ultimately won it leaving the Cangrejeros in the second place. The team went on to defeat Mayagüez in a seven-game semifinal. The other team to advance was Caguas, who gained a quick two-game lead in the final series. The Cangrejeros recovered, winning four straight games, being led by Gómez, Cepeda and Julio Navarro. Pellot, Nino Escalera and Luis Arroyo reinforced the Cangrejeros for the Caribbean series. The team finished in the third place with a .500 win percentage.

== Emergence of Cepeda; Gómez's latter career ==
The 1959–60 season marked the end of a business deal with the San Francisco Giants that resulted in the participation of that team's prospects for Santurce, when Ray Murray was fired from the manager office after shifting Cepeda to the left field and recording a losing record. Olmo became the team's new manager and the team recovered Pizarro in a trade with Caguas. The Asociación de Jugadores de Puerto Rico (lit. "Puerto Rico Players Association") was formed, with Gómez and Santiago representing the Cangrejeros. Santurce advanced to the semifinals, where they defeated Caguas twice before losing the remaining three games. The Cangrejeros finished last during the first half of the 1960–61 season and were the runner-up of the second, but this result eliminated them under a short-lived league format where only the winners of one the halves advanced to the finals. During the 1961–62 season, the team shared its home stadium, Estadio Sixto Escobar, with the Senadores, eventually moving to Hiram Bithorn Stadium. The Cangrejeros advanced to the playoffs, defeating Caguas in a seven-game semifinal. Santurce won the finals series sweeping the Indios. Cepeda broke a record by hitting 19 home runs throughout the season, while Pizarro did so by recording seven straight strikeouts against Ponce as part of his fifth consecutive year leading the LBPPR in strikeouts. The team went on to become the only LBPPR team to win the Interamerican Series, which were held in their home field. In the 1962–63 season, the Cangrejeros lost Cepeda, but reinforced its roster with prospects from the Cleveland Indians. The team advanced to the playoffs, but lost its semifinal to the Criollos. However, Pizarro was signed as the Indios' reinforcement for the Interamerican Series, pitching the only no-hitter in the event's history, which included ten strikeouts. Santurce's José Géigel was the LBPPR's Rookie of the Year. Cepeda returned to play during the 1963–64 season and was joined by José Tartabull. The Cangrejeros finished in the fourth place of the pennant race, but won the "City Championship".

In the 1964–65 season, the team signed Marv Staehle to reinforce a team that included Geigel, Martín Beltrán and Félix Maldonado. Cepeda only participated in a small number of games before being inactivated due to injury. Santurce won the pennant and advanced to the playoffs, where they defeated San Juan in the semifinals and went on to win the final series against the Indios. On January 9, 1965, the team was involved in an uncommon historic event, when Mayagüez's first baseman, Fred Hopke, did not receive the ball once, going throughout the game without recording an assist or out at first base. Staehle was the league's MVP, while Pizarro was the team's dominant pitcher. Olmo returned to the manager office in 1965–66, but the team struggled during the initial half, losing ten straight games to open the season, being unable to recover, finishing last in the standing. This was Olmo's final participation with the Cangrejeros. In the 1966–67 season, the team developed a working agreement with the Baltimore Orioles, which was a bi-product of Earl Weaver being signed to serve as manager. Santurce finished second in the regular season, losing a tie-breaker for the first place. In the semifinals, they defeated Arecibo in straight games to advance. The Cangrejeros won the championship against regular-reason champion, Leones de Ponce. The pitching staff, which included Pizzaro and Gómez, was responsible for this success, averaging a combined 1.93 ERA during the first two halves. Tony Pérez was selected the league's MVP, playing third base in a line up that included Cepeda, Gilberto Torres and Dave May. In 1967–68, Santurce won the regular season championship. After eliminating Ponce in the semifinals, the team lost the final series to Caguas. Cepeda's offense was instrumental in the team's success, particularly during the semifinal series. In the 1968–69 season, the Cangrejeros were managed by Frank Robinson. The team won the regular season title by earning their best record up to that year, but lost their semifinal series against the Senadores. Its pitcher, Jim Palmer, threw the first no-hitter in franchise history.

In 1969–70, the team advanced to the semifinals, where the defeated the Indios following a solid performance by Fred Beene. However, for the third straight year, the team failed to win a series championship against Ponce. Despite this, the race for the "City Championship" was intense, being highlighted by a no-hitter and a fan incident involving Miguel Cuéllar. On December 20, 1969, the team participated in a rare game in St. Thomas, which also involved Arecibo. Pérez went on to reinforce Ponce in the Caribbean Series, the first held in a decade. In 1970–71, the Cangrejeros signed Reggie Jackson. The team advanced to the playoffs, winning their semifinal against the Senadores. In the finals series, Santurce defeated Caguas to win its eight championship. The team's performance in the series was not enough to compete for the title. Gómez served as the Cangrejeros' manager during the following season. The team advanced to the playoffs, finishing third during the regular season. However, despite having Cepeda and the league's batting champion, Don Baylor, they failed to win their semifinal against the Leones. The team's pitcher, Roger Moret, was the league's best starter that year, with a record of 14–1. Robinson returned to the manager office in 1972–73. Pizarro and Moret were joined by several prospects from the Los Angeles Dodgers in the lineup. Santurced finished first in a regular season that was interrupted by Clemente's death in an airplane accident. In the semifinals, they defeated the Lobos 4–1. The Cangrejeros won its ninth title against the Leones, winning four of six games. The team finished second in the Caribbean Series. In 1973–74, Santurce signed Gil Flores, who served as a reserve player. The Cangrejeros maintained the fourth place of the standings throughout the season, while experiencing defensive lapses in its infield defense. Arturo Miranda, Luis Alcaraz and Manuel Ruiz were employed to compensate in the infield. However, the team was eliminated during the regular season in a sudden death game against Arecibo.

In 1974–75, Cepeda played his last season before retiring from the sport. Both Gómez and Pizarro returned as veterans with more than 20 seasons of experience. The team's performance was inconsistent, while its import players did not record good numbers, which led to a fifth-place finish, being eliminated during the regular season. Two different managers would fill the role for the next three years. The league reduced the season to sixty games in 1975–76. Moret and Gilberto Rondón served as the team's main players, while Gómez and Pizarro played another year. Juan Beníquez and Sandy Alomar Sr. complimented them. Santurce was able to clinch the final playoff berth, defeating the Leones in a series. The Cangrejeros advanced to the semifinals, losing a seven-game series against the Criollos. Pizarro played his final season with the team in 1976–77, while Gómez was signed to the Vaqueros. He, Moret, Rondón, Ramón Hernández and Esteban Texidor were the team's main figures. The Cangrejeros finished in the fourth place of the regular season standing. The team lost its semifinal to Caguas in six games. Despite having a lineup that included Alomar, Ismael Oquendo, Ruiz, Beníquez and Puchy Delgado among others, Santurce failed to qualify to the post-season in 1977–78. This was Elrod Hendricks final season with the Cangrejeros. Hiram Cuevas, who was the team's general manager, ran the team on a trust established by Poto Paniagua years before. Robinson was contracted again to manage the team in 1978–79. The team finished third during the regular season, losing its semifinal to Mayagüez.

== 1980–2000: Influx of MLB players ==
The following season, an executive vice president position was created just to allow participation to Zorilla, who also received a recognition for assembling the 1955 lineup and a new logo was debuted. Robinson returned for his final season as Santurce's manager. With a lineup of Beníquez, Pérez, Rondón, Lenny Randle, Bob Molinaro, Oquendo and Moret, the team won the pennant. The Cangrejeros defeated Arecibo in their semifinal, but lost the championship to Bayamón. Cookie Rojas was assigned to the manager position in 1980–81, signing Iván DeJesús, Fernando González and Willie Aikens. Cepeda, Gómez and Pizarro now served as coaches for the team. However, Santurce was unable to classify, finishing fifth. On April 9, 1981, Zorilla died and the following season was held in his honor. Gómez managed part of the 1981–82 season, before resigning the office for Jack Aker. Carlos Lezcano, Ed Figueroa, Guillermo Montañez and Jerry Morales were signed to the roster. After advancing to the post season, the Cangrejeros lost the semifinals to Ponce. In 1982–83, the Cangrejeros played their home games in Juan Ramón Loubriel Stadium, in the municipality of Bayamón. Figueroa, Pérez, Luis Tiant, Reggie Patterson, José Álvarez and Hernández were among the players in the roster. The team won the regular season pennant. Arecibo defeated the Cangrejeros in their semifinal. Ray Miller would serve as Santurce's manager in 1983–84. The team signed John Shelby and Jerry Willard, who won the LBPPR's MVP. Santurce finished third, but went on to lost the semifinals to Ponce. In 1984–85, the Cangrejeros signed Sandy Alomar Jr. and Rubén Sierra, receiving large amounts of game time despite their youth. Frank Verdi was the team's manager. Santurce finished third during the regular season. The Cangrejeros won its semifinal over Caguas. The San Juan Metros won the final series in seven games. Willard won the batting championship and Sierra was the Rookie of the Year.

Featuring a young roster, Santurce finished third and advanced to the newly established Round Robin in the 1985–86 season. The team got to a slow start during this phase, and was eliminated when Mayagüez and San Juan clinched the first two places to advance to the finals. In 1986–87, the team developed a three-year professional agreement with the Dodgers, which provided them with several prospects and staff members, including manager Kevin Kennedy. Despite this, the team finished fifth during the regular season and did not advance to the Round Robin. The Cangrejeros won the 1987–88 pennant. Alomar, Sierra and DeJesús were joined by the returning Willard, Mike Hartley, Orlando Sánchez, Bill Krueger and Mike Pérez. After a solid performance in the Round Robin, the team advanced to the finals along the Indios. The team lost the final series in seven games. In the final season of their contract with the Dodgers, the Cangrejeros experienced severe offensive lapses, finishing last in the league's standing. Alomar Jr. did not play during this season and left for Ponce afterwards. Ed Romero and Dwight Smith were the only players to be selected for the All-Star Game. The 1989–90 season was shortened by ten games due to Hurricane Hugo, which affected Puerto Rico's metropolitan area severely. Ray Miller was brought in as manager, but was unable to gain consistency in the team's performance. Santurce finished fifth during the regular season, being eliminated from the Round Robin. Sierra did not play during this season, while DeJesús recorded a solid performance. The 1990–91 team included Beníquez, DeJesús, Sánchez, Mark Lemke, Junior Ortíz, Jaime Navarro, Candy Sierra and Luis Aquino among others. The manager's office was held by Mike Cubbage and Mako Oliveras during the latter part of the season. After a slow start caused by several injured players, Santurce played better under Oliveras and qualified to the Round Robin. After finishing second, the team defeated Mayagüez in the final, 5–3, in a best-of-nine series. The Cangrejeros participated in the Caribbean Series, but only won once in the preliminary round. During the next season, the team was reinforced with some players from the Atlanta Braves and Steve Wendell. DeJesús, then 38 years old, retired from the league. The Cangrejeros finished fourth during the regular season. However, they were unable to advance in the Round Robin, losing four consecutive games.

In 1992–93, Bayamón lost its franchise and Santurce received the rights for Juan González and Francisco Oliveras. The combined offense of new arrivals, González, Dickie Thon and Héctor Villanueva carried the team throughout the season. The team's bullpen also recorded the league's lowest ERA, with 1.63, led by Oliveras, Greg Harris, José Lebrón and Scott Bailes. Santurce advanced to the Round Robin, where they finished second after defeating Mayagüez in an elimination game. The team won the championship, winning the final series against San Juan, 5–1. The Cangrejeros carried most of the LBPPR's awards, Oliveras was Manager of the Year and Lebrón was pitcher of the Year, while González won the league's MVP and led it in home runs. Santurce went on to win their first Caribbean Series in four decades, relying on their pitching staff and Thon's offense, while Villanueva was named the event's MVP. In 1993–94, the Cangrejeros with a roster that included González, Sierra and Leo Gómez, finished fourth during the regular season. After finishing the Round Robin with a record of 8–4, the team advanced to the final series, losing to San Juan, 5–2. For 1994–95, the Cangrejeros lost the rights of González and Oliveras to Caguas, which now held Bayamón's former franchise. The team experienced offensive lapses throughout the season, finishing fifth. This performance led to the firing of three reinforcement players, Troy O'Leary, Carl Everett and Gerald Williams, the entire outfield was changed, while only Sierra was producing. Thon retired after limited participation.

In 1995–96, the LBPPR suspended the Round Robin and returned to its former format. José Cruz was brought in as manager, which brought in a loose agreement between the team and the Houston Astros, which loaned some of their prospects. José Cruz Jr. made his debut during this season. Rey Ordóñez, Darryl Strawberry, Melvin Nieves, Eduardo Pérez and Orlando Merced formed part of the roster. Santurce finished third during the regular season. However, the Cangrejeros lost their semifinal to Arecibo. The 1996–97 team included several figures from the Astros, including Matt Galante and prospects Dennis Colón, James Mounton, Chris Holt and Brian Hunter among others. Santurce advanced to the postseason, but lost all of their semifinal games against San Juan. The following year, the Cangrejeros were unable to advance, finishing last during the regular season. In a year that the presence of Astros' personnel was already diminishing, Sierra still had solid offensive, while Scott Elarton pitched a no-hitter for the team. In January 1999, the final "City Championship" of the decade was played, since San Juan's franchise was moved to Carolina. Santurce advanced to the playoffs, but were swept by Mayagüez in their semifinal.

== Franchise instability (2000–2012) ==
The Cangrejeros opened the decade by winning their twelfth LBPPR championship. The team went on to win the Caribbean Series that were held in Santo Domingo undefeated. This was the Cangrejeros' fifth Caribbean championship and the only title that a team from Puerto Rico won during that decade. In 2004, after a big decline in attendance in recent years, the Cangrejeros were sold to José Valentín, who decided to move the team to Manatí, with the approval of the mayor of San Juan, causing controversy among fans of the Cangrejeros. In response, the mayor changed the name of the Senadores de San Juan to Cangrejeros de Santurce for the 2004–05 season. However, the following season, the new Cangrejeros moved and the team changed its name to the Lobos de Arecibo, leaving the capital city without a baseball team for the first time in the league's history.

In May 2008, it was announced that the team would resume play for the 2008–09 season, and that the Atenienses de Manatí would be moved back to Santurce, and again become the Cangrejeros. As part of the Liga de Béisbol Profesional de Puerto Rico's restructuration program, Major League Baseball offered to work with its publicity. On July 15, 2008, personnel from the league and Major League Baseball participated in a reunion, where details about the league's merchandising were discussed. The team was still owned by Valentín. Participating in the now-renamed Puerto Rico Baseball League, the Santurce made the playoffs in their first season back after a four-year absence, but were eliminated in the first round. In November 2009, a dispense suggested by Valentín was accepted by the league's board of directors, and the team recessed for the following season. This was due to the franchise's difficulty to secure a home stadium due to the opposition of San Juan's municipal government. In August 2010, the league announced the return of the Cangrejeros, as well as the Senadores, to Hiram Bithorn Stadium. However, the following month, the municipality of San Juan once again opposed the participation of the two teams in the venue. League officials immediately held a reunion with municipal government personnel, pursuing a solution. They were not listed on the 2010-11 LBPPR schedule.

== Return of the franchise and back to success (2012–present) ==
Thanks to the claim of the Santurce fans and in preparation for the 75th anniversary celebration, the Professional Baseball League reactivated the franchise for the 2012–2013 season.

As of the 2014–15 season, the team plays in the Puerto Rican league (now renamed the (LBPRC) They won the 2014-2015 championship under the management of Eduardo Perez. They once again crowned champions on the 2015–2016 season under the management of Ramon Vazquez, who also led the team to another championship on the 2018–2019 season beating the Mayaguez Indios. Vasquez resigned as a manager right after winning the title due to discomforts with hardcore Cangrejeros fans. Due to his prompt resignation right after winning the title, the team designated Carmelo Martinez as interim manager who led the team during the 2019 Caribbean Series in Panama.

For the 2019–2020, Santurce announced the hiring of José Valentín who was a former player for this franchise and former champion as a player in the 1999–2000 season. Valentin led Cangrejeros to the best record (21-10) during the regular season and faced again the Mayaguez Indios in the finals. Santurce won the series (4-1) earning the 16th title for the franchise on its 80th anniversary. Since rejoining the league, Cangrejeros has won 4 titles, including straight titles twice, the only "back-to-back" wins in franchise history.

== See also ==
- Puerto Rico national baseball team
- List of Major League Baseball players from Puerto Rico
- List of baseball players who have played in the Caribbean Series
- History of baseball outside the United States
