= Bill Greason =

American baseball player and minister (born 1924)

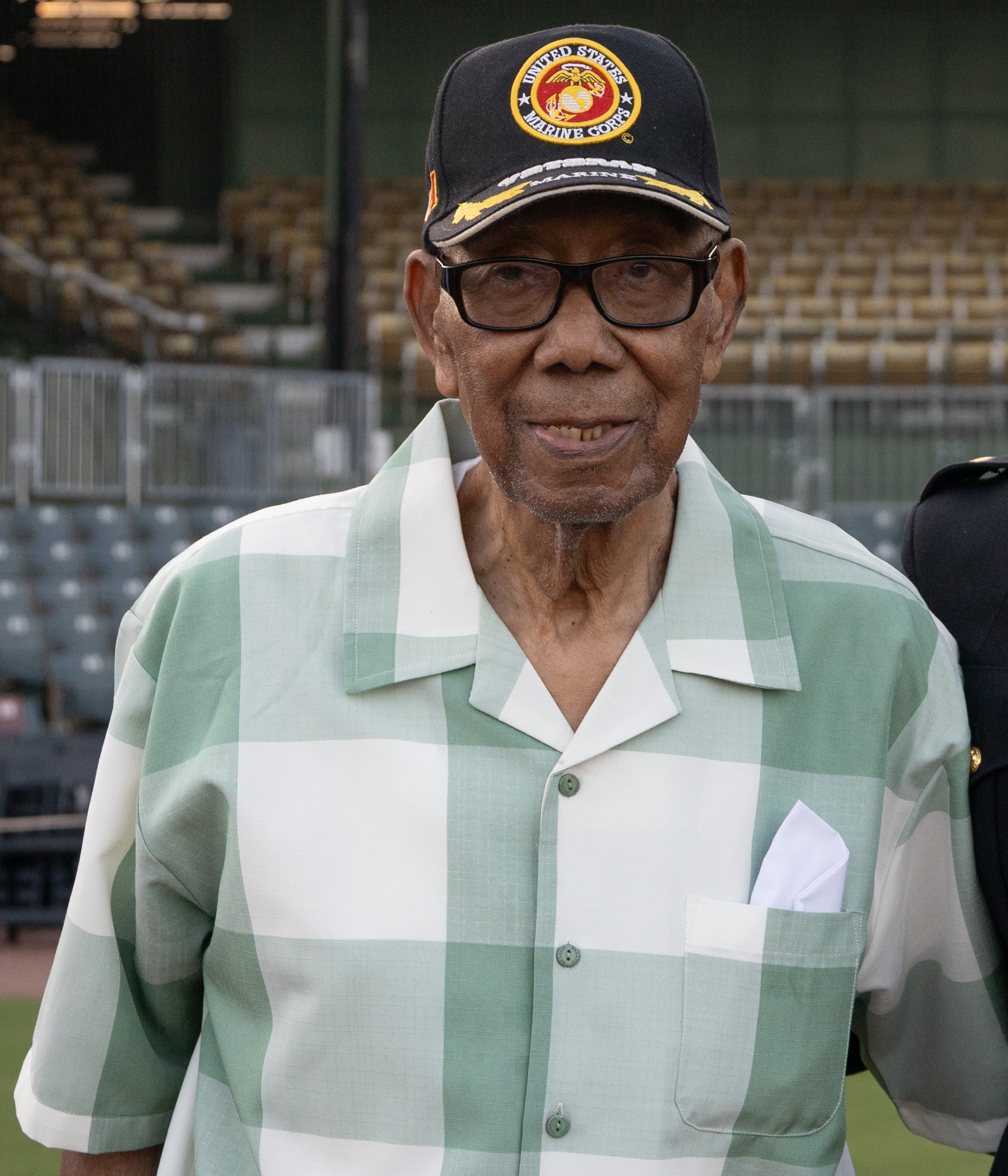
- Greason on his 100th birthday in 2024
- Pitcher
- Born: September 3, 1924 (age 102); Atlanta, Georgia, U.S.
- Batted: Right Threw: Right

Professional debut
- NgL: 1948, for the Birmingham Black Barons
- MLB: May 31, 1954, for the St. Louis Cardinals

Last MLB appearance
- June 20, 1954, for the St. Louis Cardinals

MLB (Note: On December 16, 2020, Major League Baseball declared the Negro leagues, from the span of 1920–1948, to be a "Major League". Greason's statistics reflect his time in the Negro leagues during his 1948 season.) statistics
- Win–loss record: 3–3
- Earned run average: 4.62
- Strikeouts: 36
- Stats at Baseball Reference

Teams
- Negro leagues: Birmingham Black Barons (1948–1951); Major League Baseball: St. Louis Cardinals (1954)

Career highlights and awards
- NgL All-Star (1949)
Military career
Allegiance	United States
Branch	United States Marine Corps
Service years	1943–1945, 1951–1952
Unit	V Amphibious Corps
Conflicts	World War II (Battle of Iwo Jima); Korean War

William Henry Greason (born September 3, 1924) is an American former professional baseball pitcher who years later became a Baptist minister in Birmingham, Alabama. Greason played for the Birmingham Black Barons in the Negro leagues from 1948 to 1951 and for the St. Louis Cardinals of the National League in 1954.

Greason is the last living player who played in the Negro Major Leagues.

== Early life ==
Greason was born in Atlanta, where, as he told a 2020 interviewer, "I grew up across the street from Martin Luther King Jr." Greason enlisted in the United States Marine Corps during World War II—one of the first black Marines—and completed his basic training at Montford Point. He embarked with the 66th Supply Platoon, an all-black unit, for the Pacific Theater of Operations and took part in the Battle of Iwo Jima.

== Negro league career ==
Greason was a 5 ft 10 in (1.78 m), 170 lb (77 kg) right-handed pitcher. After the war, he played professional baseball in the Negro leagues for the minor league Nashville Black Vols and Asheville Blues, and the major league Birmingham Black Barons, where he was a teammate of Willie Mays. According to Baseball Reference, Greason posted a 3–2 record in eight games pitched for the 1948 Black Barons, with four complete games, one shutout and one save, with an earned run average of 4.44. That season, in the last-ever Negro League World Series, he defeated the soon-to-be champion Homestead Grays to claim Birmingham's lone victory in the five-game series.

In 1950 and 1951, Greason also played for the Charros de Jalisco of the independent, racially integrated Mexican League.

== National League career ==
In 1952, Greason joined minor league baseball as a member of the Oklahoma City Indians of the Double-A Texas League, where he won nine of his ten decisions and posted a 2.14 earned run average. Earlier that season, the Texas circuit had been integrated by another African-American pitcher, Dave Hoskins of the Dallas Eagles. On August 3, 1952, the two men faced each other in a game at Dallas that drew 11,000 fans, half of them from the black community; Greason won the game, 3–2.

Another successful year at Oklahoma City in 1953 led to Greason's acquisition by the St. Louis Cardinals of Major League Baseball, where he would become the team's second African-American player, after Tom Alston.

Greason appeared in three games for the 1954 Cardinals, two as a starting pitcher. In his May 31 debut, he took the loss after allowing five earned runs and five hits over three innings in a rain-shortened game against the Chicago Cubs. In Greason's next start, he failed to record an out against the Philadelphia Phillies and allowed one earned run. In his final MLB game, he pitched a scoreless inning of relief against the New York Giants.

Altogether, Greason allowed eight hits and six earned runs in four MLB innings pitched, with four bases on balls and two strikeouts. He spent the remainder of his professional baseball career in the upper levels of the minor leagues in the Cardinal farm system, retiring after the 1959 season.

== Ministry and later life ==
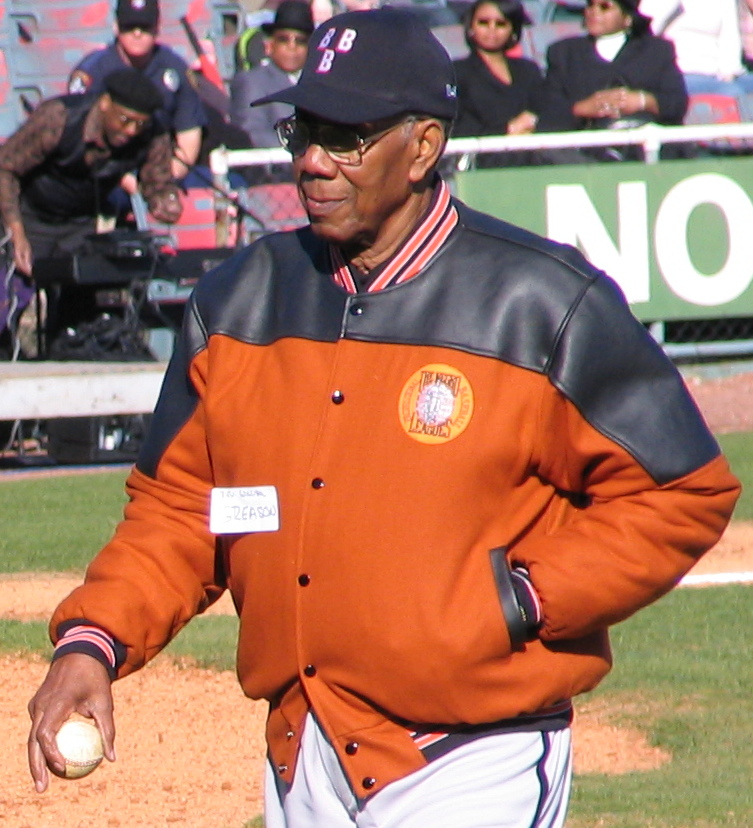
Greason at Rickwood Field in 2006

After his playing days, Greason became a member of the 16th Street Baptist Church. After his church was bombed by the Ku Klux Klan on September 15, 1963, killing four children, he studied for the ministry at Birmingham Baptist Bible College and Samford University. In 1971, he became pastor of Birmingham's Bethel Baptist Church Southside (later Bethel Baptist Church - Berney Points) where he continued to preach into 2024.

In 2011, Greason was presented with a lifetime achievement award at the annual Alabama Black Achievement Awards Gala. In 2012, the Montford Point Marines, including Greason, were awarded a group Congressional Gold Medal.

On June 20, 2024, Greason threw out the ceremonial first pitch at the MLB at Rickwood Field game. He turned 100 in September 2024. Following Art Schallock's death on March 6, 2025, Greason became the oldest living former MLB player. On February 3, 2026, the death of Ron Teasley left Greason as the last living Negro League player.

== See also ==
- List of Negro league baseball players who played in Major League Baseball

== Notes ==
Records
Preceded by Art Schallock	Oldest recognized verified living baseball player March 6, 2025 – present	Current holder
