= Sam Jones (baseball) =

American baseball player (1925–1971)

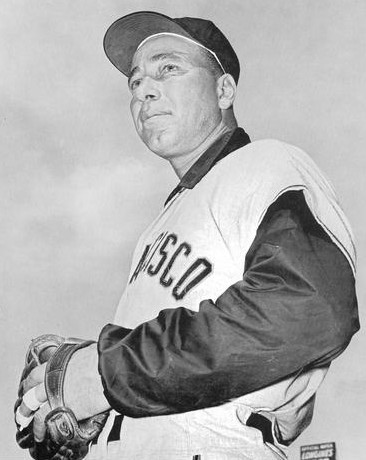
- Jones with the San Francisco Giants in 1961
- Pitcher
- Born: December 14, 1925; Stewartsville, Ohio, U.S.
- Died: November 5, 1971 (aged 45); Morgantown, West Virginia, U.S.
- Batted: Right Threw: Right

Professional debut
- NgL: 1947, for the Cleveland Buckeyes
- MLB: September 22, 1951, for the Cleveland Indians

Last MLB appearance
- October 3, 1964, for the Baltimore Orioles

MLB statistics
- Win–loss record: 103–104
- Earned run average: 3.63
- Strikeouts: 1,393
- Stats at Baseball Reference

Teams
- Cleveland Buckeyes (1947–1948); Cleveland Indians (1951–1952); Chicago Cubs (1955–1956); St. Louis Cardinals (1957–1958); San Francisco Giants (1959–1961); Detroit Tigers (1962); St. Louis Cardinals (1963); Baltimore Orioles (1964)

Career highlights and awards
- 2× All-Star (1955, 1959^{2}); NL wins leader (1959); NL ERA leader (1959); 3× NL strikeout leader (1955, 1956, 1958); Pitched a no-hitter on May 12, 1955

Samuel "Toothpick" Jones (December 14, 1925 – November 5, 1971) was an American Major League Baseball pitcher with the Cleveland Indians, Chicago Cubs, St. Louis Cardinals, San Francisco Giants, Detroit Tigers and the Baltimore Orioles between 1951 and 1964. He batted and threw right-handed.

== Early career ==
Born in Stewartsville, Ohio, Jones played for several Negro league teams, including the Orlando All-Stars and Oakland Larks in 1946; and the Cleveland Buckeyes, where he played under the management of Quincy Trouppe, in 1947 and 1948; and the Kansas City Royals, a "touring Negro League squad handpicked by Satchel Paige." In 1948-49 he played in Panama, and then, with the end of the Negro National League, played semi-pro ball until he was signed by the Indians organization in the fall of 1949, playing Class A ball in the season and winter ball for Panama in 1949–50.

== Major League career ==
Jones began his major league career with the Cleveland Indians in 1951. When he entered a game on May 3, 1952, 39-year-old rookie Quincy Trouppe, a Negro league veteran, was behind the plate. Together they formed the first black battery in American League history. Both Sam Jones and Quincy Trouppe played for the Cleveland Buckeyes in the Negro American League.

After the 1954 season, the Tribe traded him to the Chicago Cubs for two players to be named later, one of whom was slugger Ralph Kiner. In 1956, the Cubs traded him to the St. Louis Cardinals in a multi-player deal; prior to the 1959 season, he was dealt this time to the San Francisco Giants for Bill White and Ray Jablonski. He was picked 25th by the expansion Houston Colt .45s in the 1961 expansion draft, then traded to the Detroit Tigers for Bob Bruce and Manny Montejo. He rejoined the Cardinals for the 1963 campaign and played 1964 with the Baltimore Orioles. He spent the final three years of his pro career as a relief pitcher with the Columbus Jets of the International League before retiring at the end of the 1967 season.

== Legacy ==
During his career, Jones was known for his sweeping curveball, in addition to a fastball and changeup. Stan Musial once remarked, "Sam had the best curveball I ever saw... He was quick and fast and that curve was terrific, so big it was like a change of pace. I've seen guys fall down on curves that became strikes."

During his career, Jones led the National League in strikeouts, and walks, three times: in 1955, 1956, and 1958. On May 12 of the first of these three seasons, he no-hit the Pittsburgh Pirates 4–0 at Wrigley Field, becoming the first African American in Major League history to pitch a no-hitter. He achieved this after walking Gene Freese, Preston Ward (who was pinch-run for by Román Mejías) and Tom Saffell to begin the ninth inning, he left the bases loaded by striking out Dick Groat, Roberto Clemente and Frank Thomas in succession. His greatest year came with the Giants in 1959, when he led the league in both wins with 21 (tying him with Milwaukee Braves starters Lew Burdette and Warren Spahn) and ERA with 2.83. He was named 1959 National League Pitcher of the Year by The Sporting News, but finished a distant second to Early Wynn of the Chicago White Sox for the Cy Young Award. He was named to the NL All-Star team twice, in 1955 and 1959.

Jones is one of the Black Aces, African-American pitchers with at least 20 wins in a single MLB season.

== Death ==
Jones died from a recurrence of neck cancer first diagnosed in 1962, in Morgantown, West Virginia on November 5, 1971, at the age of 45.

== See also ==
- List of Negro league baseball players who played in Major League Baseball

Preceded by Jim Wilson	No-hitter pitcher May 12, 1955	Succeeded by Carl Erskine
