= Harry Chiti =

American baseball player (1932–2002)

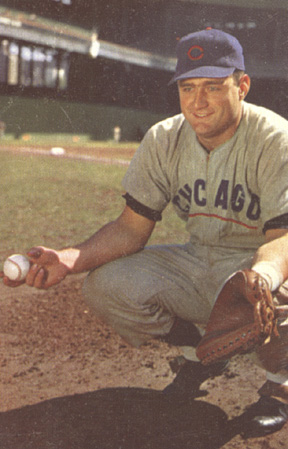
- Chiti at the Polo Grounds in 1952
- Catcher
- Born: November 16, 1932; Kincaid, Illinois, U.S.
- Died: January 31, 2002 (aged 69); Haines City, Florida, U.S.
- Batted: Right Threw: Right

MLB debut
- September 27, 1950, for the Chicago Cubs

Last MLB appearance
- June 10, 1962, for the New York Mets

MLB statistics
- Batting average: .238
- Home runs: 41
- Runs batted in: 179
- Stats at Baseball Reference

Teams
- Chicago Cubs (1950–1952, 1955–1956); Kansas City Athletics (1958–1960); Detroit Tigers (1960–1961); New York Mets (1962)

Harry Dominic Chiti Jr. (pronounced /ˈtʃiːtiː/ CHEE-tee) (November 16, 1932 – January 31, 2002) was an American catcher in Major League Baseball. He appeared in 502 games over all or parts of ten seasons between 1950 and 1962 for the Chicago Cubs, Kansas City Athletics, Detroit Tigers and New York Mets. Chiti batted and threw right-handed, and was listed as 6 feet 2 inches (1.88 m) tall and 221 pounds (100 kg). Born in Kincaid, Illinois, he was the father of major league coach Dom Chiti. He is known for being the first MLB player to be traded for himself.

== Career ==
A competent defensive catcher with a great ability to handle the knuckleball, Chiti was 17 years old when he broke into the majors with the Chicago Cubs in September 1950, and he made infrequent appearances in MLB from 1950 to 1952 as he learned his trade in the Cubs' farm system.

After two years in the United States Army during the Korean War, Chiti returned to Chicago and handled the starting job in 1955, batting .231 with 11 home runs and 41 RBI in a career-high 113 games.

In 1956, Chiti shared catching duties with Hobie Landrith. On May 30 (Memorial Day) he made an entry for himself in Cubs trivia, during the second game of a windblown doubleheader against the Milwaukee Braves, in which 39 runs were scored overall. While being intentionally walked, Chiti hit Ray Crone's pitch, delivered a little too close to the outside corner of the plate, into the right field corner for a triple.

At season's end, he was sent to the 1956 World Series champion New York Yankees but never saw any action with the Bronx Bombers. He was drafted by the Kansas City Athletics from New York in the 1957 Rule 5 draft.

Chiti played with the Athletics from 1958 to 1960. The next three years, he was part of transactions between the A's, Detroit Tigers, Baltimore Orioles and Cleveland Indians.

On April 25, 1962—before he played a game for the Indians—Chiti was acquired by the expansion New York Mets for a player to be named later. However, he was sent back to the Indians on June 15, 1962, after 15 games and a .195 batting average. Chiti was the "player to be named later"; he became the first MLB player to be traded for himself. Three other players have been traded for themselves: Dickie Noles, Brad Gulden, and John McDonald.

Chiti never played in another major league game, spending his last two years with the Triple-A Toronto Maple Leafs before retiring after the 1964 season.

Harry Chiti died on January 31, 2002, at Heart of Florida Hospital in Haines City, at the age of 69. He was survived by his wife Catherine; his daughter Cindy; his son, former minor league pitcher and coach, Dom; and eight grandchildren. He is buried at Rolling Hills Cemetery in Winter Haven, Florida.
