= Buster Clarkson =

American baseball player (1915-1989)

- Shortstop / Third baseman
- Born: March 13, 1915; Hopkins, South Carolina, US
- Died: January 18, 1989 (aged 73); Jeannette, Pennsylvania, US
- Batted: Right Threw: Right

Professional debut
- NgL: 1938, for the Pittsburgh Crawfords
- MLB: April 30, 1952, for the Boston Braves

Last MLB appearance
- June 22, 1952, for the Boston Braves

MLB (Note: On December 16, 2020, Major League Baseball declared the Negro leagues, from the span of 1920–1948, to be a "Major League". Clarkson's statistics reflect his time in the Negro leagues from 1938-1946.) statistics
- Batting average: .309
- Home runs: 24
- Runs batted in: 139
- Stats at Baseball Reference

Teams
- Negro leagues: Pittsburgh/Toledo/Indianapolis Crawfords (1938–1940); Newark Eagles (1940); Philadelphia Stars (1942, 1946, 1949); Major League Baseball: Boston Braves (1952)

James Buster Clarkson (March 13, 1915 – January 18, 1989) was an American professional baseball player who played briefly in Major League Baseball and had a long career in the Negro leagues, the minor leagues, and the Puerto Rican Professional Baseball League. He is also known as Buzz.

== Playing career ==
Clarkson was a native of Hopkins, South Carolina, where he grew up practicing baseball. In the Negro leagues, he played shortstop for the Crawfords in Pittsburgh in 1937–38, in Toledo in 1939, and in Indianapolis in early 1940, where the team folded. He also briefly played in 1940 for the Newark Eagles before signing with the Mexican League, where he played in 1940–41 and 1946–47. In 1942 he returned to the Negro leagues, playing for the Philadelphia Stars and hitting .360. He spent 1943–45 serving in the US Army during World War II. He played part of the 1946 season with Philadelphia and returned to play with them again in 1949-50. In 1948, he played in the independent Canadian Provincial League.

In 1950 at age 35, Clarkson entered the minor leagues with the Milwaukee Brewers of the American Association. He played third base and shortstop, hitting .302 in 1950 and .343 in 1951.

In 1952, five years after Jackie Robinson became the first African American major leagues baseball player, Clarkson at age 37 had his only opportunity to play in the major leagues when he played fourteen games for the Boston Braves. He managed to connect five hits in 25 at-bats, with one RBI.

He spent the rest of 1952 in Milwaukee, hitting .318. In 1953–54, he played with Dallas in the Texas League, hitting .330 and .324. In 1954 he led the league with 42 home runs. In 1955 he played with the Los Angeles Angels in the Pacific Coast League and hit .294. The next year was his final season in the minors, as he played with Los Angeles, Tulsa in the Texas League, and Des Moines in the Western League.

As a younger man, Clarkson went to the Caribbean, where he became very well known, particularly in Puerto Rico. Clarkson played in Puerto Rico's winter baseball league until he was in his 40s. It was at the age of 39, in early 1955, that he participated in the Caribbean Series, with the Santurce Crabbers. During the 1940s and 1950s, Clarkson was a resident of Puerto Rico, leading the Crabbers to a number of championships. The Crabbers took five years to win a new national title when the Caribbean Series was first played, in 1950.

With the Crabbers, Clarkson played alongside two young stars in the making: Roberto Clemente and Willie Mays. Clarkson helped the team win the 1955 national title, and become the first team representing Puerto Rico to win a Caribbean Series championship.

After his retirement, Buster Clarkson led a relatively quiet life in Pennsylvania, until his death, on January 18, 1989, in the small town of Jeannette. His remains are buried at the Brush Creek Cemetery, in nearby Irwin.

Some of the artifacts he used as a baseball player are on exhibition at the Negro Leagues Baseball Museum.

== See also ==
- List of Negro league baseball players who played in Major League Baseball
