= 1995 Caribbean Series =

Thirty-seventh edition of baseball tournament; held in San Juan, Puerto Rico

The thirty-seventh edition of the Caribbean Series (Serie del Caribe) was held from February 3 through February 8 of 1995 in San Juan, Puerto Rico. The series featured four teams from Dominican Republic, Mexico, Puerto Rico and Venezuela. The hometown team, the Senadores de San Juan of the Puerto Rican League won the series. The team was managed by Luis Meléndez. Roberto Alomar, a second baseman for the Senadores, was named the Most Valuable Player after batting .560.

While the San Juan club had faced difficulty in emerging as the champions of the Puerto Rican Winter League, the team swept its way through the six-game series, outscoring their opponents by a combined score of 49–15. The Azucareros del Este of the Dominican League lost one game 16-0 to Puerto Rico. However they won all of their games against the other teams thanks to the arms of José Rijo, Pedro Martínez and Pedro Astacio to place second with a 4–2 record.

Puerto Rico was helped by having many major leaguers who normally would have taken off the time for spring training. Roberto Alomar (.560, 10 RBI, 9 R, .840 SLG, 2 SB) was the Series MVP and he was helped by Bernie Williams (.417, .875 SLG), Juan González (.375, .667 SLG), Edgar Martínez (.375, 9 RBI), Carlos Baerga, Rubén Sierra, a young Carlos Delgado hitting cleanup, Roberto Hernández, Rey Sánchez (.333), Doug Brocail (1-0, 1.00), José Alberro (1-0, 0.00 in 4 games), Eric Gunderson (1-0, 1.13), Ricky Bones and Chris Haney (2.45) among others. Sanchez had won the Puerto Rican Winter League batting title but batted 9th with the superb lineup in front of him.

== Final standings ==
Team	League	G	W	L	WPCT	Manager
Senadores de San Juan	PUR Puerto Rican League	6	6	0	1.000	Luis "Torito" Meléndez
Azucareros del Este	DOM Dominican League	6	4	2	0.667	Art Howe
Naranjeros de Hermosillo	MEX Mexican Pacific League	6	1	5	0.167	Derek Bryant
Leones del Caracas	VEN Venezuelan League	6	1	5	0.167	Pompeyo Davalillo

== Leaders ==
- Batting Average: .560 – Roberto Alomar, Senadores de San Juan
- Home Runs: 3 – Bernie Williams, Senadores de San Juan
- Runs Batted In: 10 – Roberto Alomar, Senadores de San Juan
- Wins: 2 – Ricky Bones, Senadores de San Juan
