= Senadores de San Juan =

Baseball team based in San Juan, Puerto Rico

Logo
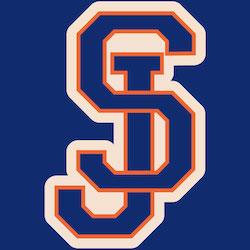
Cap insignia

Information
- League: Roberto Clemente Professional Baseball League
- Location: San Juan, Puerto Rico
- Ballpark: Hiram Bithorn Stadium
- Founded: 1938
- Caribbean Series championships: 1 (1995)
- League championships: 8 (1945–46, 1951–52, 1960–61, 1963–64, 1984–85, 1989–90, 1993–94, 1994–95)
- Former name: Metros de San Juan (1984–94)
- Former ballpark: Estadio Sixto Escobar
- Colors: Blue, black, orange, white
- Ownership: Roberto Alomar
- Manager: Ricky Rivera

Current uniforms
Main	Retro

Senadores de San Juan (lit. San Juan Senators) are a professional baseball team based in San Juan, Puerto Rico. Originally established in 1938, the club has historically been one of the most successful in the Puerto Rican Professional Baseball League. It has won eight league titles in its storied history, and also claimed the 1995 Caribbean Series championship, with an undefeated record of 6–0, under manager Luis Meléndez. The team ceased play in 2011, but returned to the league starting with the 2024–25 season.

The Senadores' traditional rivals are the Cangrejeros de Santurce, which share Hiram Bithorn Stadium in San Juan; meetings between the two rivals are known as the "City Champ". At its peak the Santurce-San Juan rivalry lead to the fans of the Senadores boycotting a brand of chocolate (Sambo) because it advertised the Cangrejeros. In international competition, the Senadores have gathered accolades that include defeating the Cuban national baseball team to snap a 100-game winning streak and assembling the "Dream Team", a lineup that won the 1995 Caribbean Series and is still considered the strongest Puerto Rican baseball team ever assembled.

== History ==
The Senadores club was founded in 1938 and played intermittently in the Liga de Béisbol Profesional de Puerto Rico, the predecessor to the current Liga de Béisbol Profesional Roberto Clemente (LBPRC).

For the 1984–1985 season, they were rechristened as the Metros de San Juan, a name that they conserved until the 1993–1994 tournament.

The team was sold in 2004 and subsequently relocated to Arecibo. In 2010 they returned to San Juan.

The Senadores de San Juan were expelled for the 2011–12 season.

The Senadores returned to the LBPRC in the 2024–25 season under the ownership of Roberto Alomar, as a rebranding of his "RA12" developmental club.

== International competition ==
On December 1, 1993, the Senadores defeated the Cuban national baseball team in an exhibition game with a score of 4-3. The team was managed by Luis Meléndez and featured a roster loaded with MLB players including Edgar Martínez, Carmelo Martínez, Javier López, Carlos Delgado, Carlos Baerga, Lee Tinsley, John Mabry, and Ryan Thompson, among others. Managed by Jorge Fuentes and featuring a roster that included Omar Linares, Orestes Kindelán, Lourdes Gourriel, Antonio Pacheco, Jorge Luis Valdés, Lázaro Valle, Pedro Luis Rodríguez, Omar Ajete and Germán Mesa, Cuba entered the game as the incumbent Olympic and IBAF World Champion riding on a 100-game winning streak that dated back to the 1991 Intercontinental Cup. This was the visiting team's first matchup with an opponent that featured a MLB-caliber lineup, since they won an exhibition series over two Venezuelan teams (3-1) in 1977.

The game was a success, selling 23,000 tickets and special rules that allowed the use aluminum bats during the late innings were implemented. It also created political tension when an airplane paid by the Cuban exile flew over Hiram Bithorn Stadium urging the players to defect. The game was a close affair, but ended when López hit a walk off home run off Ajete while trailing by a run in the ninth inning, giving San Juan the victory and snapping Cuba's winning streak. Though the morale of the visitors was noted by the press to be low following the loss, none of the players defected during the visit. Sports journalist Damián Delgado Averhoff later listed this as one of the two most painful defeats suffered by the Cuban national baseball team (second only to the final of the 2000 Olympics), stating that it was responsible for shattering a "myth of invincibility" that the government had promoted to the populace, causing nation-wide mourning.

In 1995, the Senadores de San Juan assembled one of the strongest teams in the history of the Caribbean Series. The group, which was dubbed "El Dream Team", featured Major League Baseball players in most positions, counting with a lineup that included Roberto Alomar, Carlos Baerga, Ricky Bones, Carlos Delgado, Juan González, Roberto Hernández, Carmelo Martínez, Edgar Martínez, Rey Sánchez, Rubén Sierra, and Bernie Williams.

== See also ==
- Lobos de Arecibo
- Senadores de San Juan players

== Sources ==
Bibliography

- Muratti Nieves, Daliana (2006). Chaguín Muratti: Un receptor del béisbol romántico puertorriqueño. Asociación de Periodistas de Puerto Rico. ISBN 1596082720.
