= Juan González (baseball) =

Puerto Rican baseball player (born 1969)

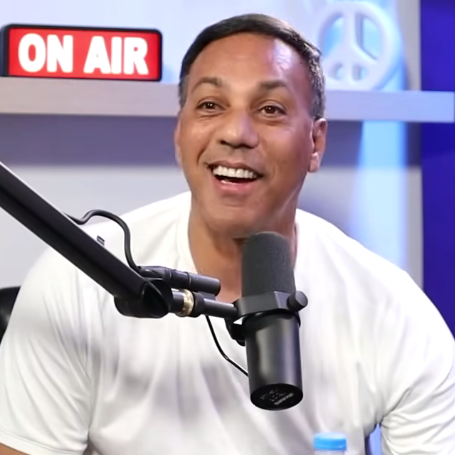
- González in 2024
- Outfielder
- Born: October 20, 1969 (age 57); Vega Baja, Puerto Rico
- Batted: Right Threw: Right

MLB debut
- September 1, 1989, for the Texas Rangers

Last MLB appearance
- May 31, 2005, for the Cleveland Indians

MLB statistics
- Batting average: .295
- Home runs: 434
- Runs batted in: 1,404
- Stats at Baseball Reference

Teams
- Texas Rangers (1989–1999); Detroit Tigers (2000); Cleveland Indians (2001); Texas Rangers (2002–2003); Kansas City Royals (2004); Cleveland Indians (2005)

Career highlights and awards
- 3× All-Star (1993, 1998, 2001); 2× AL MVP (1996, 1998); 6× Silver Slugger Award (1992, 1993, 1996–1998, 2001); 2× AL home run leader (1992, 1993); AL RBI leader (1998); Texas Rangers Hall of Fame

Member of the Caribbean

Baseball Hall of Fame
- Induction: 2015
Medals
Men's baseball
Coach for Puerto Rico
World Baseball Classic
Silver medal – second place	2017 Los Angeles	National team
Manager for Puerto Rico
Pan American Games
Gold medal – first place	2019 Lima	National team
Central American and Caribbean Games
Gold medal – first place	2018 Barranquilla	National team
Bronze medal – third place	2026 Santo Domingo	National team

Juan Alberto González Vázquez (born October 20, 1969), nicknamed Juan Gone, is a Puerto Rican former professional baseball outfielder. He played 16 seasons in Major League Baseball (MLB) for four teams, but is most identified with the Texas Rangers, for whom he played from 1989 to 1999 and again from 2002 to 2003. One of the premier run producers and most feared hitters of the 1990s and early 2000s, González hit over 40 home runs five times and amassed at least 100 runs batted in (RBI) eight times. He also had a batting average of .310 or higher in five seasons.

In his career as a whole, González averaged 42 home runs, 135 RBI, 81 extra-base hits, and 353 total bases per 162 games, placing him well within the top ten all-time in these season-adjusted statistics.

González was known as a line drive hitter, not a fly-ball home run hitter, as were many power hitters of the 1990s. He was a full-time player at the age of 21 and a two-time Most Valuable Player before his 30th birthday. González explained his propensity for bringing runners home by saying, "I concentrate more when I see men on base."

== Early life ==
González grew up in a rough area of Puerto Rico, where as a young boy he learned to hit bottlecaps and corks with a broomstick handle in the Alto de Cuba barrio. In the Puerto Rico youth league, González batted cleanup behind future Yankee center fielder Bernie Williams, where both competed against González's future teammate Iván Rodríguez. When the Yankees scouted the teenage Williams, he requested that they also bring his friend González to their scouting camp on the east coast; however, due to a lack of funding, González would remain in Puerto Rico.

== Professional career ==
=== Minors ===
The Texas Rangers signed González as an amateur free agent on May 30, 1986, at the age of 16. González has always wanted to serve as a role model for the kids of Puerto Rico, as they are faced with the downfalls of drugs and prostitution frequently. González avoided such temptations growing up. His father, a math teacher, and mother, a housewife, made sure González and his two sisters behaved properly and stayed away from negative influences. González moved his family out of the barrio early in his MLB career. He paid utility bills for down-on-their-luck friends and plans on working to construct recreation facilities and a baseball diamond in his home town. One of Juan's managers, Johnny Oates, believed that until you've walked where Juan González has walked, you just won't understand. Speaking from experience, as Oates has walked the streets of Vega Baja, Puerto Rico, during visits multiple times, he had this to say: "I don't think you can appreciate how far he's come until you've been there", Oates said. "We might be making choices between going to the movies or going to the skating rink. But look at the choices the kids there were faced with growing up – do you want to do drugs or get beaten up? I think it says so much about him that he was able to rise above the peer pressure in Vega Baja. He had enough intelligence to say, 'I don't want to do that.'"

In Puerto Rico he is known as "Igor", the nickname he has carried since he was a nine-year-old fascinated by the professional wrestler "Igor the Magnificent." "I watched wrestling all the time and I still like it", González said. "One day when I was nine, I told another guy, 'I'm Igor.' And he said, 'Okay, your name is Igor from now on.' And I've been Igor since then."

González debuted with the 1986 GCL Rangers and finished with .240 batting average, .303 on-base percentage, and a .266 slugging percentage in 60 games. He only had five extra-base hits (none of them home runs) in 233 AB and struck out 57 times. He tied Harvey Pulliam by grounding into a Gulf Coast League-leading 9 double plays.

In 1987, González showed some improvement with the Gastonia Rangers, though Mark Whiten and Junior Felix were deemed better outfield prospects in the South Atlantic League. In ratings by Baseball America, González tied Ryan Bowen for 10th place on the prospect listing. He finished with .265 batting average, .306 on-base percentage, and .401 slugging percentage with 14 home runs and 74 RBI.

González spent 1988 with the Charlotte Rangers and batted .256/~.327/.415 with 8 home runs in 277 AB. One of his outfield teammates that year was Sammy Sosa. The next year, he showed more improvement with the Tulsa Drillers hitting .293/~.322/.506 with 21 home runs and led the Texas League with 254 total bases. He outhomered Sosa by 14 and was third in the League in home runs, behind teammate Dean Palmer (25) and Chris Cron (22). González was rated the league's No. 4 prospect by Baseball America, behind Ray Lankford, Andy Benes and José Offerman. Lankford and Warren Newson joined him in the TL All-Star outfield.

=== Texas Rangers (1989–1999) ===
González was called up by the Texas Rangers in September of that year, but only hit .150/.227/.250. During his time with the Rangers that year, González only hit one home run. He became the youngest player in Rangers history (19 yrs old) to hit a home run.

In 1990, González – playing with the Oklahoma City 89ers – led the American Association in home runs (29), RBI (101) and total bases (252). He made the AAA All-Star outfield alongside Lankford and Bernard Gilkey and was named the league MVP. Baseball America named him the top prospect in the league in a poll of managers. He finished with .258/~.343/.508 for the 89ers. In the AAA All-Star Game, González hit 4th for the AL prospects and played as a designated hitter. He went 2 for 5 with a double, one of the game's two homers, two runs and two RBI in the AL's 8–5 loss. González was again called up by the Rangers and did far better this time, batting .289/.316/.522.

In 1991, Texas gave González a chance to be an everyday player. He batted .264 while hitting 27 home runs and recording 102 runs batted in (RBIs). González came up as a center fielder, as did teammate Sammy Sosa; but the Rangers opted to keep González and trade Sosa. González split his time in the OF between CF (93 games) and LF (92 games). González thrilled the club in his first full season at the young age of 21, as his 27 home runs led the Rangers. His 102 RBI was good enough for 2nd on the club, and 7th in the AL.

In 1992, González finished with a .260 batting average, 43 home runs, and 109 RBIs. He spent most of his time in CF in '92, playing 123 games there, 31 in LF and making just one appearance in RF, while DH-ing 4 games. He was the American League home run champion (one more than Mark McGwire) while also ranking 3rd in TB (309), 4th in extra-base hits (69), 5th in slugging percentage (.529), 7th in RBIs (109) while winning his first Silver Slugger Award. Winning the home run crown at the age of 22 made him the youngest player to lead the majors since Johnny Bench in 1970.

In 1993, González broke through to true stardom. He led the AL for the second consecutive year with 46 bombs, while raising his batting average an impressive 50 points to .310, all this to go along with a league-leading slugging percentage of .632. That production garnered González an invite to his first All-Star team. During the 1993 All-Star Weekend, he participated in the only Home Run Derby of his career. González and Ken Griffey Jr. put on an amazing display of raw-power, as they each golfed 7 homers a piece. González, however, wowed the national audience even more, becoming the first player to hit a homer into the facade of the upper deck in left field (estimated 473 feet) at Oriole Park at Camden Yards and the green wall behind the center-field fence (estimated 455 feet). González then defeated Griffey in a winner-take-all playoff for the individual Home Run Derby title, 5–4. When asked about the title, González responded: "It was very exciting to surprise everybody. I never thought in my mind that I'd win the Home Run Derby. I even surprised myself." He also finished fourth in voting for the 1993 AL MVP and earned his second consecutive Silver Slugger Award.

In 1994, the Rangers moved from Arlington Stadium to The Ballpark in Arlington. González batted 19 home runs in 1994 during the strike-shortened season, but belted 27 home runs in 1995, in just 90 games.

From 1995–98, González was an RBI machine, averaging more than an RBI per game (514 RBI, 511 games). This made him the first player since World War II to drive in a run per game for any four-year period. He won two MVP awards in this stretch (1996 and 1998). The New Bill James Historical Baseball Abstract listed him as the player who had the highest ratio of slugging percentage to on-base percentage in baseball history at that time, ahead of Dave Kingman and Tony Armas and 4th in RBI per game by an outfielder (behind Sam Thompson, Joe DiMaggio and Babe Ruth). James also ranked González as the 52nd-best right fielder in baseball history as of mid-2000.

In 1996, González had one of his best seasons hitting .314 with a .643 slugging percentage. He edged Alex Rodríguez by one first-place vote (11–10) and 3 award points (290–287) in a very close vote to win the American League MVP. He won his third Silver Slugger as an outfielder and was second in the AL in slugging (87 points behind McGwire). He was selected to the Associated Press Major League All-Star Team and The Sporting News AL All-Star squad at season's end. González was also named the Puerto Rico Pro Athlete of the Year by Associated Press and the DFW Metroplex Pro Athlete of the Year by the Dallas All Sports Association. He received the honorable selection of American League Player of the Month in July, leading the majors in batting (.407), homers (15), RBI (38), slugging (.917) and total bases (99). González was also the AL Player of the Week for July 29 – August 4. González had a pair of 21-game hitting streaks, June 25 – July 19 and August 8–31, matching the 3rd longest hitting streaks in team history with Mickey Rivers (1980) being the only other Ranger with 2 20-game hitting streaks in the same season. On July 30, González went 5–5 vs. New York, a career best and tied the club record for hits in a game. González was also chosen as a member of the Major League Baseball All-Star Team that traveled to Japan for an eight game exhibition series in November, batting .500 (10–20) with one homer and 3 RBI in 7 games. That year, the Texas Rangers made the playoffs, and in the 1996 American League Division Series, González homered five times in four games and batted .438/.526/1.375 with 9 RBI. Texas ended up losing in four games to the New York Yankees. González tied Jeffrey Leonard's 1987 NLCS record by homering in four straight post-season games and joined Reggie Jackson and Ken Griffey Jr. as the only players to hit five home runs in a single post-season series. González, however, accomplished this feet in less games (4) than Leonard, Jackson and Griffey Jr; all of whom needed at least 5 games to accomplish said feat. Combining the regular season and postseason, González hit .315 with 52 home runs, 153 RBIs, and .664 slugging percentage in 1996.

In 1997, González batted .296/.335/.589 as a DH-RF for the Rangers, winning his fourth Silver Slugger Award. In 133 games he was 4th in slugging, 6th in total bases (314), third in homers (42) and RBI (131), 10th in extra-base hits (69) and tied for 6th with 10 sacrifice flies. González missed the first month of the season and was not activated from the DL until May 2 due to a torn ligament in his left thumb. Despite the injury he still managed to earn American League Player of the Month honors in September (.337, 10 home runs, 26 RBI) and was the Rangers Player of the Month in both August and September. González was selected to Baseball America's American League All-Star Team.

In 1998, he reached the 100 RBI mark before the All-Star break (101), being the first player (and still most recent) to do so since Hank Greenberg 63 years earlier. He hit cleanup for the AL in the 1998 All-Star Game and decisively won the AL MVP award. González was 10th in the 1998 AL in batting average, second in slugging, fourth in OPS, 6th in hits (193), 4th in total bases (382), first in doubles (50), tied for fourth in home runs (45), first in RBI (157) in 154 games, tied for 8th in OPS+ (149), second in extra-base hits (97), tied for third in sac flies (11), tied for sixth in intentional walks (9) and tied for third in double plays ground into (20). In April, he drove in 35 runs, a major league record for the month that still stands today. González produced the 5th season ever of at least 50 doubles and 40 home runs. González started 115 games in Right and 36 as the DH.

González became the 1st 5-time winner of the Rangers Player of the Year Award and was also named as the AL's Most Valuable Player by USA Today and USA Today Baseball Weekly. González was selected to major league all-star teams selected by the Associated Press (OF) and Baseball America (DH) and to the Sporting News AL all-star squad (OF). He was named as an outfielder on the AL Silver Slugger Award team for the 5th time in his career, his 3rd consecutive year. González shared Rangers Player of the Month honors with Iván Rodríguez in April and won the award outright in May. González also received the American League Player of the Week, for August 31 – September 6. He received 21 of 28 1st place mvp votes and 7 2nd place votes for 357 total points to defeat Boston's Nomar Garciaparra, who had 5 1st place votes and 232 points. González also became the 1st native of Latin America to ever win multiple MVP's since the award was instituted in 1931. This award also made him the 16th player to capture 2 MVP's in a 3-year span. The Rangers reached the playoffs, only to be swept by the Yankees. The Rangers offense was miserable in the Division Series, scoring just one run on a Pudge Rodriguez single after doubling to lead off the inning.

In 1999, González was 9th in the AL in average, 4th in slugging, 6th in OPS, 10th in runs (114), 6th in total bases (338), 6th in home runs (39), 5th in RBI (128), 7th in extra-base hits (76) and 2nd in sacrifice flies (12). However, he and the Rangers wound up being swept for the second consecutive year by the Yankees in the Division Series. González wasn't able to do much in the 3-game series, hitting .182/.250/.455 with one home run, but his solo bomb was the only run the Rangers scored in the series.

González announced just before the 1999 All-Star Game that if the fans did not elect him to the starting lineup, he would refuse an invitation to be added to the roster (as a result he was not invited). González believed that the system was flawed; he thought the managers and players should vote for the starters. A few weeks later González didn't dress for the Hall of Fame exhibition game because (according to the media) the uniform pants the Rangers brought for him were too large. González later had this to say about the incident: "I couldn't play because my right wrist was sore. The pants they gave me were size 40. I wear 34. They were clown pants."

=== Detroit Tigers (2000) ===
Following the 1999 season, with one year left on his contract, the slugger was traded by the Texas Rangers along with Danny Patterson and Gregg Zaun in a blockbuster nine-player deal with the Detroit Tigers for Frank Catalanotto, Francisco Cordero, Bill Haselman, Gabe Kapler, Justin Thompson, and Alan Webb. He became the first two-time MVP to be traded since Dale Murphy was sent from Atlanta to Philadelphia in 1990. Detroit Tiger general manager Randy Smith was paying a high price for González by trading multiple young players, but he couldn't pass up on acquiring González, whom he referred to as "a two-time MVP and future Hall-of-Famer," even though González would more likely be a one-year rental (and was).

Gambling that they would be able to extend his contract past the 2000 season, the Tigers reportedly offered González an eight-year, $140 million contract soon after the deal was struck. González refused, which turned out to be the bigger gamble. He began the season badly, hobbled by foot pain and unable to adjust to the spacious dimensions of Detroit's new Comerica Park, where the left-center field fence stood nearly 400 feet from home plate (he did however hit the park's first home run on April 14). By mid-season he had announced that the Tigers would have to bring the fences in if they wanted to re-sign him as a free agent.

Detroit shopped González before the trading deadline, but a deal that would have sent him to the Yankees for outfielder Ricky Ledée and two minor leaguers was scuttled when the outfielder made it clear that he didn't want to play in New York. The Puerto Rico native stumbled through the rest of the season and saw his production dip to an all-time low (22 home runs, 67 RBI in 115 games). After missing the last weeks of the 2000 season, he was granted free agency on November 1.

=== Cleveland Indians (2001) ===
On January 9, 2001, he signed a one-year $10 million contract with the Cleveland Indians. González opened the season with a great start, batting .388 (40–103) with 9 homers and 32 RBIs in season's first 25 games through May 2. González completed the first half on a torrid pace. He was voted in as an All-Star starter and batted 5th in the 2001 All-Star Game. González hit .347 with 23 home runs and 83 RBI in 79 games in the first half.

He appeared to be on his way to easily capturing the RBI title, but an RBI drought at the end of the season (0 RBI in last 10 games) allowed Bret Boone to pass him by one. González hit over .300 in each of season's 1st 5 months before dropping to .299 for the month of September. His top months were .387 (36–93) in April and .356 (26–73) in July. González was hitting as high as .360 on June 5, then went 17–64 (.266) in next 17 contests, dropping to .338 through June 26. Had a .351 (73–208) mark in next 56 games and was at .344 overall, 2nd in the AL, through September 9. After this he hit just .130 (6–46) in final 13 games, going 3–34 (.088) in last 10 contests. González was hitless in his final 15 trips after his single on September 24. Despite his cold streak over the last week and a half of the season, he still finished with a .325/.370/.590 slash line and a 147 OPS+, close to his MVP seasons. He also won his sixth Silver Slugger and finished fifth in the MVP voting. His .325 average was one point shy of his career high (1999) and marked his 5th .300 season, his third in the last four years.

He was sixth in the 2001 AL in batting average, 5th in slugging, 6th in OPS, 9th in home runs (35), second in RBI (140, (in 140 games) one behind leader Bret Boone), 8th in OPS+, tied for third in double plays grounded into (18) and led the league with 16 sacrifice flies. González was also a 2nd team selection on Baseball America's Major League all-star squad and was named as the Indians player of the year by Baseball America. This proved to be the last season in which González averaged an RBI a game. Although González finished the regular season rather slowly, he showed up in a big way in the playoffs where he hit .348/.348/.739 for Cleveland in the Division Series with 3 doubles, 2 homers and 5 RBI in 5 games. Despite this Cleveland still fell in defeat.

González had a season best 15-game hitting streak from August 29 – September 19 at .345 (20–58) and hit safely in 10 straight games from April 17–27. González also had a 4 hit game April 11 at the Chicago White Sox. González batted .368 (43–117) vs. left-handers, 3rd best in the AL and had a .335 (53–158) mark with runners in scoring position, the 8th highest. As the DH, he hit .392 (31–79), this was the highest average in AL among players with 35 or more DH at bats, with 8 homers and 33 RBI in 21 games.

Through 11 full major league seasons (1991-2001), González had 392 homers and 1,263 RBI, an average of 36 homers and 115 RBI per year. His RBI total was the most in MLB in during that time frame by 40, despite having 1,000 fewer plate appearances than the player with the second-most RBIs for the time period, Jeff Bagwell (who was inducted into the Hall of Fame in 2017).

=== Second stint with Texas Rangers (2002–2003) ===
On January 8, 2002, González made his return to Arlington by signing a two-year $24 million contract with the Texas Rangers. He hit .282/.324/.451 (94 OPS+) the first year in 70 games. On June 18, he participated in the first MLB game ever with four players with 400+ home runs to that point. Rafael Palmeiro and Fred McGriff joined Sosa and González in a game which Texas lost to the Chicago Cubs, 4–3. His first season back in Arlington he had a .358 (29–81) average versus lefties and hit .328 (21–64) with runners in scoring position while posting a .307 mark(42–137) in Arlington. He hit just .171 (6–35) with 2 homers and 4 RBI as the DH. He had Texas' only hit, a leadoff double in the 8th, off Cory Lidle on July 19 at Oakland.

In 2003, González started the first few weeks rather slowly. He had a .230 average with 4 homers and 8 RBI in his first 18 games through April 20. He quickly picked it up though and went on a .349 (29–83) tear with 9 homers and 24 RBI in his next 21 games, improving to .293 by May 5. As of May 7, González was tied for the Major League Lead in home runs with 12. He followed that up by going just 8-for-39 (.205) in his next 9 games, falling to .276 through May 25. He started a hot streak yet again though by hitting .321 (42–131) with 10 homers and 36 RBI in the next 34 games. But his season was cut short by a tear in his calf muscle on July 19. At the time, González was hitting .294 and ranked 3rd in home runs (24) 4th in slugging percentage (.572) and 7th in RBI (70) in the AL. González was on pace to recapture his 2001 Indians form, but the tear lingered and the injury proved to be the end of his season.

González hit 2 homers in a game 4 times: April 5 vs. Seattle; April 29 and May 1 at Toronto and July 10 against Minnesota. His 47 career multi-homer games are 12th most all-time. He also hammered 5 homers in 3 games, April 29 – May 1 at Toronto, the 4th time in Rangers history that feat had been accomplished. He had a season best 5 RBI on April 29 at Toronto and drove in 4 runs in a game on 3 occasions. González had 18 RBI in a 9-game span, April 22 – May 1, including 10 in 3-game series at Toronto, April 29 – May 1. He was selected as AL co-player of the week for April 28 – May 4. He also had a season high 9-game hitting streak, June 3–17.

He started 57 games in right field and 24 games as the designated hitter. He did not make an error in 108 total chances in the outfield and was tied for 6th in the league in outfield assists (10), despite his short season. He ranked 5th on the club in home runs (24), and completed his 11th season with 20 or more home runs. The Rangers, however, were preparing for a youth movement and on October 26, 2003, he was granted free agency.

=== Kansas City Royals (2004) ===
On January 6, 2004, González was signed by the Kansas City Royals to a one-year, $4.5 million deal with an option for the next season. However, his back worsened in the middle of May and his season came to an end after May 21. He ended up hitting .276/.326/.441 with five home runs and 17 RBI in 33 games. The Royals declined to renew his option, making him a free agent.

=== Second stint with Cleveland Indians (2005) ===
He was signed by the Cleveland Indians for the 2005 season, and was activated in May. Despite a thorough workout regimen, González suffered a major hamstring injury (he tore his right medial hamstring totally off the bone at the knee joint) in his first plate appearance of the season while running out a grounder. This put him out for the season after just one at-bat.

González signed on with the independent Atlantic League in 2006, playing for the Long Island Ducks. He hit .323/.377/.515 in 36 games, with 6 home runs and 23 RBI. His time was again limited by injuries.

The St. Louis Cardinals invited González to spring training prior to the 2008 season. He was one of 26 non-roster invitees, participating in full roster workouts that began on February 19, 2008. He hit .308 with a .462 slugging percentage in spring training with 1 home run, 1 double and 5 RBI in 9 games. However, he was put on the inactive list with an abdominal strain and he returned to Puerto Rico with an invitation to rejoin the Cardinals once he was healthy. González decided to stay in Puerto Rico, and did not rejoin the Cardinals.

In June 2013, González was invited to become a member of the Texas Rangers Hall of Fame. He declined the invitation at the time, saying, "I closed the Texas Rangers chapter in my life a long time ago." A couple years later, though, he accepted the invitation and was inducted on July 11, 2015. González is the Rangers' all-time leader with 372 home runs, 1,180 RBIs and a .565 slugging percentage. His 157 RBIs in 1998 and .643 slugging percentage in 1996 are also club records. González ranks in the top 5 in club history in almost every other major offensive category.

=== Career statistics ===
Games	PA	AB	R	H	2B	3B	HR	RBI	BB	SO	BA	OBP	SLG	FLD%
1689	7155	6556	1061	1936	388	25	434	1404	457	1273	.295	.343	.561	.983

In four American League Division Series covering 15 games, González hit .290 (18-for-62) scoring 11 runs, with 8 home runs and 15 RBI.

== Career in Puerto Rico ==
In the 1989–1990 Puerto Rican Professional Baseball League, González hit .269/~.345/.500 for the Criollos de Caguas and hit 9 home runs, one less than former league leader Greg Vaughn.

During the 1992–1993 season, he batted .333 for the Santurce Crabbers and won the league MVP award despite not playing until after the All-Star break. He hit 7 home runs and led the league despite playing in only 66 games. González did not accompany Santurce to the 1993 Caribbean Series. The next season, he ended up hitting .268 with 7 homers, 3 behind Phil Hiatt.

In 1995, González joined the San Juan Senators for the 1995 Caribbean Series and hit .375 with 6 RBI as the Puerto Rican "Dream Team" won the title. González hit 5th, between Carlos Delgado and Rubén Sierra on a team that also boasted Roberto Alomar, Bernie Williams, Carlos Baerga and Edgar Martínez. San Juan outscored their opponents 49–15.

During the 2006–2007 Puerto Rican League, in 33 games playing for the champion Carolina Giants, González hit .281 with 18 RBIs and 4 homers. In 12 playoff games, he batted .369 with 3 home runs and 5 RBIs. González claims he is healthy and no longer feels pain in his legs. He was 10 for 26 (.385) in the 2007 Caribbean Series and made the All-Star team at DH.

Presently, he is the owner of the baseball team in his hometown, Vega Baja, in the Confederative Baseball League in Puerto Rico, where he also plays as a DH. Aside from baseball, he focuses on helping the community, with the condition that no attention from the media occurs when he becomes involved in a cause, stating "What value does it have to help someone and then publicizing it in newspapers? That is not giving. I help, but I ask them to please not say anything."

For the 2015-2016 season, González served as coach of the Double A Vega Baja team, the Caimanes del Melao Melao. However, after a 3-11 record, he was fired.

== Steroid allegations ==
González was one of several players whom Jose Canseco claimed to have introduced to steroids. Canseco made these allegations in his best-seller, Juiced, but without citing any corroborating evidence. González was also briefly mentioned in the Mitchell Report regarding a 2001 incident in which an unmarked bag in the Indians' team luggage was detained by customs in Toronto, Canada. González's assistant stated that the bag belonged to Angel Presinal, a prominent personal trainer for a number of professional players, but Presinal claimed that the bag belonged to González. It was also disputed whether or not the bag actually contained steroids. Although Presinal claimed the bag was not his, he said that he was aware of its contents and that they were not, in fact, steroids. He stated that the bag contained Soladek (a vitamin D shot used to fight the flu), Dolo-neurobion (painkiller), and Clenbuterol (a stimulant similar to ephedrine, which is believed by some to promote muscle tone and weight loss). González immediately cut ties with the trainer following the incident. In 2007, ESPN published an article about Presinal on its website, describing him as "fitness guru, massage therapist and personal trainer to baseball's Latino elite." In the same article, ESPN asked John Hart, the Indians' former general manager, about the 2001 incident involving Presinal. Hart said that the team looked into the matter and ultimately exonerated Gonzalez.

In 2007, Rangers' owner Tom Hicks speculated that González had used steroids, saying in an interview that the team had acquired "Juan González for $24 million after he came off steroids, probably, we just gave that money away." Hicks later acknowledged that his statement was not based on personal knowledge, only a suspicion that steroids were the cause of injuries: "The way his body broke down at a young age and his early retirement makes me suspicious." Luis Mayoral, a former Ranger employee and good friend of González, reasoned that Hicks' comments were why González declined his first invitation to join the Texas Rangers Hall of Fame in 2013. Instead, he was inducted in 2015.

González has consistently stated over the years that he has never taken steroids, and is, in fact, a vegetarian. "I have nothing to hide," said González. "Nothing. And I offered to be tested, whenever they wanted. If you have nothing to hide, there is nothing to worry [about]," González said.

== Personal life ==
González has been married four times. He was married to Puerto Rican volleyball player Elaine López, sister of fellow major leaguer Javy López, during the early 1990s. This marriage broke down when a local newspaper released a cover photo of singer Olga Tañón kissing González during a concert in San Juan. A scandal followed, with González divorcing Elaine López and marrying Tañón, who said she had no idea González was married to Lopez when she kissed him. González and Tañon had a daughter together, Gabriela González Tañón, in 1996. They got married in December 1999. González and Tañon divorced less than two years later. His daughter later became one of only 50 people in the world (and the first Puerto Rican) ever to have been diagnosed with Sebastian syndrome, a mild blood clotting disorder.

González has a friendship with George W. Bush, which began when González debuted with the Texas Rangers, who at the time were owned by Bush. González stated that "a friendship that goes beyond baseball was created between them" and during his time in office Bush invited González to the White House twice. The first meeting took place in 2001 and the second in 2007; in the latter he was accompanied by historian Luis Rodriguez Mayoral. The discussion lasted 35 minutes and involved González's future in the Major Leagues and other baseball related topics, as well as the happenings of their respective careers. During this visit to Washington, D.C. González was also involved in a meeting with Rudy Giuliani and a visit to Walter Reed Army Medical Center in order to visit Puerto Rican soldiers that were injured in the Iraq War.

After a history of personal setbacks, González stated in a 2007 interview that his personal life was now in order. "I'd rather have health and my family, my relationship with God than money," he said. "How many people who can buy whatever they want have committed suicide? God is first, then your kids, your family, good health."

== Managerial career ==
=== Puerto Rico ===
After serving as a coach in 2017, González was named manager and head coach of the Puerto Rico national baseball team in 2018, leading the team to gold medals in both 2018 and 2019.

González made his debut as manager at the 2018 Central American and Caribbean Games (CACG). Unable to request athletes contracted to MLB (or active in MiLB), González assembled a team consisting of players active in foreign independent leagues, the local Double A amateur league, and veteran free agents with previous professional experience, making the final cut following a preparatory tournament. González made his official debut as manager in a 5-3 victory over Venezuela. In its next outing, Puerto Rico defeated Cuba 8-1 to snap Cuba's 36-year (43-game) winning streak at the CACG. This was followed by wins over the Dominican Republic (4-1) and Mexico (7-1). González closed his first participation as manager by leading Puerto Rico to the CACG gold medal, defeating second-place Colombia 2-1.

In 2019, González found continued success by guiding Puerto Rico to win gold at the 2019 Lima Pan American Games, going undefeated and besting Canada 6-1 in the final. This was Puerto Rico's first-ever gold medal in baseball in the history of the Pan American Games.

Also in 2019, the Puerto Rican Baseball Federation announced that González would be the manager of the Puerto Rican National Team in November’s WBSC Premier12, the biggest international baseball event of the year, in preparation for the Tokyo 2020 Olympic Games. González was named Puerto Rico's manager for the 2025 edition of the Copa América.

== Accomplishments ==
- 2-time American League MVP (1996, 1998)
- 5-time Top-10 MVP (4th, 1993; 1st, 1996; 9th, 1997; 1st, 1998; 5th, 2001)
- 3-time All-Star (1993, 1998, 2001)
- 5 40+ HR Seasons (1992, 43; 1993, 46; 1996, 47; 1997, 42; 1998, 45) and 1 39-HR Season (1999)
- His .561 slugging percentage ranks 15th on the all-time list
- His 434 career home runs rank 47th on the all-time list
- Ranks 4th all-time in plate appearances/HR with 16.49 (No. 1 Mark McGwire – 13.14, No. 2 Babe Ruth – 14.87, No. 3 Sammy Sosa – 16.25)
- Ranks 5th all-time in HR/162 games with 42
- Ranks 5th all-time in TB/162 games with 353
- Ranks 6th all-time in RBI/162 games with 135
- Ranks 6th all-time in XBH/162 games with 81
- Ranks 12th all-time in career multi-homer games
- Ranks 15th all-time in AB per HR with 15.1 AB/HR
- 6 Silver Slugger awards (1992, 1993, 1996, 1997, 1998, 2001)
- 2-time Major League Home Run Champion (1992, 1993)
- Finished Top 5 in RBI 6 times (1993, 4th, 118; 1996, 2nd, 144; 1997, 3rd, 131; 1998, 1st, 157; 1999, 5th, 128; 2001, 2nd, 140)
- Finished Top 5 in slugging percentage 7 times (1992, 5th, .561; 1993, 1st, .632; 1996, 2nd, .643; 1997, 4th, .589; 1998, 2nd, .630; 1999, 4th, .601; 2001, 5th, .590)
- Became just the second player in major league history to have at least 100 RBI before the All-Star break (101 in 1998, second to Hank Greenberg who had 103)
- Holds all-time record for RBI in the month of April (35 in 1998)
- One of only six players after 1950 with over 150 RBI in a single season
- Hit his 300th home run in the fewest games in American League history (1,096)
- 9th Youngest ever to hit 300 Career HR (28 years, 334 days)
- Tied for 1st in postseason history for HR in a single division series with Ken Griffey Jr., but in fewer games (Gonzalez – 5 HR in 4 games in 1996, Griffey – 5 HR in 5 games in 1995)
- Tied for 2nd in most HR in a single playoff series with 5 HR in just 4 games in 1996. (Reggie Jackson 1977, 5 HR in 6 Games; Chase Utley 2009, 5 HR in 6 Games; Ken Griffey Jr. 1995, 5 HR in 5 Games; Nelson Cruz 2011, 6 HR in 6 games)
- Ranks 2nd in postseason history in slugging percentage in a single playoff series (1.375 in 1996)
- Ranks 2nd in postseason history in OPS in a single Division Series (1.901 in 1996)
- Ranks 5th in postseason history in OPS in a single playoff series among qualified leaders (1.901 in 1996)
- Tied for 2nd with 10 other players in extra base hits in a single Division Series (5 in 1996 & 2001)
- Ranks 3rd in postseason history in total bases in a single Division Series (22 in 1996)
- Ranks 7th in postseason history in RBI in a single Division Series (9 in 1996)
- Tied for 2nd in postseason history in career HR in the Division Series (8 HR)
- Ranks 4th in postseason history in career slugging percentage in the Division Series (.742)
- Ranks 7th in postseason history in career extra base hits in the Division Series (12)
- Ranks 8th in postseason history in career OPS in the Division Series (1.075)

== See also ==
- List of Major League Baseball career home run leaders
- List of Puerto Ricans
- List of Major League Baseball career runs scored leaders
- List of Major League Baseball career runs batted in leaders
- List of Major League Baseball annual runs batted in leaders
- List of Major League Baseball annual home run leaders
- List of Major League Baseball players named in the Mitchell Report

Preceded by Mark McGwire; Bernie Williams	American League Player of the Month; July 1996; September 1997	Succeeded by Alex Rodriguez; Manny Ramirez
