= Andy González =

Andy Gonzalez or González is the name of:

- Andy González (musician) (1951-2020), Latin jazz bassist
- Andy González (baseball) (born 1981), Puerto Rican baseball player
- Andy González (athlete) (born 1987), Cuban middle-distance runner
