= Juan López (baseball) =

Puerto Rican professional baseball player and coach (born 1962)

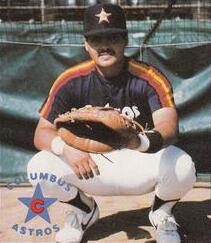
- López as a player for the Columbus Astros c. 1988
- Catcher / Coach
- Born: May 16, 1962 (age 64); Bayamón, Puerto Rico
- Bats: Right Throws: Right
- Stats at Baseball Reference

Teams
- As coach: San Francisco Giants (1999–2002); Chicago Cubs (2003–2006); Cincinnati Reds (2008–2013)

Juan Enrique López (born May 16, 1962), nicknamed "Yunque" or "Porky", is a Puerto Rican former professional baseball player, bullpen catcher, and coach. He was a bullpen coach in Major League Baseball (MLB) for three different National League teams during 14 seasons between 1999 and 2013. During his playing career, he was listed at 5 feet 11 inches (1.80 m) and 187 pounds (85 kg); he throws and bats right-handed.

== Professional career ==
As player

López was signed as a non-drafted free agent by the Cleveland Indians in 1983. He played six seasons in the minor leagues, between 1983 and 1989, for the Indians, Houston Astros, and San Francisco Giants organizations. He briefly reached the Triple-A level, appearing in 21 games for the Tucson Toros of the Pacific Coast League in 1987.

As coach

López started his coaching career as a minor league coach for the Giants' extended spring training in 1990. He coached for the rookie-level Arizona League Giants from 1991 to 1993. He was then a scout for the Detroit Tigers in 1994. In 1995 and 1996 he coached in the Giants' farm system for the Bellingham Giants and Burlington Bees, respectively. He then was the bullpen catcher for the major-league Giants in 1997 and 1998.

López was the Giants' major-league bullpen coach from 1999 to 2002, working under manager Dusty Baker. López followed Baker to the Chicago Cubs in 2003, working as their bullpen coach from 2003 to 2006. Following the departure of Baker, López left the Cubs and was the manager of the rookie-level Gulf Coast League Mets during 2007.

In 2008, López joined Baker once again as the Cincinnati Reds bullpen coach, and served in that role through the 2013 season.

López began the 2021–22 Liga de Béisbol Profesional Roberto Clemente season as manager of RA12 but was replaced midseason by Eduardo Galarza.

== Personal life ==
López graduated from Nicolas Sevilla High School in Toa Alta, Puerto Rico, in 1978. He played baseball at Yavapai Junior College in Prescott, Arizona. He and his wife Flor Sanchez have three children: Jack (also a professional baseball player), Aleimalee, and Johnnielee.
