= RA12 =

Information
- Location: Gobernador Piñero, San Juan, Puerto Rico
- Founded: 2020
- Folded: 2024
- Former league: Liga de Béisbol Profesional Roberto Clemente (LBPRC)
- Former ballpark: Hiram Bithorn Stadium
- Colors: Royal blue, navy blue, crimson, white
- Ownership: Roberto Alomar
- Manager: José Muñoz

RA12 was a Puerto Rican professional baseball team based in San Juan. It competed in the Liga de Béisbol Profesional Roberto Clemente (LBPRC). Between its inception in 2020 and its final season in 2023–24, the team played its home games at Hiram Bithorn Stadium in San Juan.

The team's founder, owner and namesake was Hall of Fame Puerto Rican professional baseball player Roberto Alomar. It was intended to serve as a development team for young Puerto Rican players.

The team finished in last place in each of its four seasons in the league. In 2024, Alomar revived the Senadores de San Juan in LBPRC and discontinued RA12.

== History ==
In 2017, Robert Alomar and his father, Sandy, were watching a game in the LBPRC and lamented the lack of young, Puerto Rican players in the league. Alomar had been 17 years old when he debuted in the league under manager Felipe Alou and credited that experience with helping him reach Major League Baseball at 20 years old.

In June 2020, Alomar approached the leadership of the LBPRC about adding an expansion team to the league. On June 10, Juan A. Flores Galarza, president of the LBPRC, announced that the league's board of directors had unanimously approved the admission of Alomar's team, to be named RA12 after Alomar's initials and the uniform number he wore as a player. Its logo featured a silhouette of Alomar celebrating a home run in the 1992 World Series.

Alomar's stated goal in forming RA12 was to "serv[e] the youth of Puerto Rico." The following month, he joined the board of directors of the LBPRC. He said he felt the league needed "to be the foundation of player development in Puerto Rico."

The team was to begin play that December in the COVID-shortened 2020–21 season with Alex Cintrón as manager, Ricky Bones as pitching coach and Roberto's brother, Sandy Alomar Jr., as bench coach. José Muñoz and Carlos Baerga also joined the coaching staff. In late October, Cintrón announced that he would not be able to manage the team due to health concerns. He was subsequently replaced in that role by Andy González. Sandy Alomar Sr. was named RA12's general manager. The team filled out its roster by staging tryouts throughout Puerto Rico.

In its inaugural season, RA12 finished in last place in the standings with a record of 2–16 and last in most statistical categories including runs, runs allowed, hits, hits allowed, walks and walks allowed. However, the team's batters were also 5.8 years younger on average than those of the league's three other teams and its pitchers were 4.3 years younger on average. In spite of its statistical record, Alomar described the season as a success. He reiterated that his intent was to give young players the chance to play professional baseball against high-level talent.

=== 2021–22 ===
RA12 opened the 2021–22 season with Juan López as manager but replaced him in November with Eduardo Galarza after an eight-game losing streak. Their record improved in their second season to 8–24 and they remained the youngest team in the league on average by several years.

=== 2022–23 ===
In 2022–23, RA12 fielded its first 30-year-old player and its first Major Leaguer, infielder Yadiel Rivera. Rivera finished second on the team and in the league in batting average to 26-year-old catcher Rubén Castro. Castro's .305 batting average was the lowest to lead the league since Wil Cordero's .304 average in the 1992–93 season. In spite of the success of Castro and Rivera, RA12 was the first team to be eliminated from playoff contention and finished in last place with a 14–36 record.

=== 2023–24 ===
One week into the 2023–24 season, after a 1–3 start, RA12 announced that manager Eduardo Galarza would be replaced by José Muñoz. Colorado Rockies top prospect, Dominican infielder Adael Amador, appeared in 21 games with RA12 in 2023–24. For the fourth season in a row, the team finished in last place. On June 9, 2024, Adael Amador made his Major League debut and became the first RA12 alumnus to do so.

After the end of the 2023–24 season, it was reported that RA12 would be renamed the Senadores de San Juan. Although the Senadores were owned by Roberto Alomar and played their home games at Hiram Bithorn Stadium, they otherwise had little in common with RA12. The 2024–25 Senadores had a new general manager in Alex Cintrón and fielded older, non-Puerto Rican players such as José Abreu.

== Season-by-season records ==
Season-by-season records
Season	Regular-season				Postseason			Ref.
Season	Record	Win %	League	GB	Record	Win %	Result	Ref.
2020–21	2–16	.111	4th	12	0—4	.000	Lost in the first round to Criollos de Caguas	
2021–22	8–24	.250	5th	13 1/2	—	—	—	
2022–23	14–36	.280	6th	17	—	—	—	
2023–24	11–29	.275	6th	14	—	—	—	
Totals	35–105	.250	—	—	0–4	.000	—	—
