= Pancho Coimbre =

Puerto Rican baseball player (1909–1989)

Francisco Coimbre
- Born: 29 January 1909; Coamo, Puerto Rico
- Died: 4 November 1989 (aged 80); Ponce, Puerto Rico
- Batted: Right Threw: Right

Negro leagues debut
- 1940, for the New York Cubans

Last Negro leagues appearance
- 1944, for the New York Cubans

Negro leagues (Note: On December 16, 2020, Major League Baseball declared the Negro leagues, from the span of 1920–1948, to be a "Major League". Coimbre's statistics reflect his time in the major Negro leagues from 1940–1944.) statistics
- Batting average: .334
- Home runs: 6
- Runs batted in: 93
- Stats at Baseball Reference

Teams
- Leones de Ponce (Puerto Rico); Ponce-Kofresí (Puerto Rico); Tigres del Licey (Dominican Republic); Santa Marta and Pastora (Venezuela); Porto Rico Stars (Negro leagues); New York Cubans (Negro leagues)

Career highlights and awards
- 2× East-West All-Star (1941, 1943); LBPPR's MVP award (1943)

Francisco "Pancho" Coimbre Atiles (29 January 1909 – 4 November 1989), more commonly known as Pancho Coimbre, was a Puerto Rican professional baseball player. He played four seasons with the New York Cubans of the Negro leagues from 1940 to 1944.

Coimbre was born in the municipality of Coamo and moved to Ponce early in his life. It was in Ponce where he would begin to actively participate in sports, both in sprinting and baseball. Coimbre played thirteen seasons in the Puerto Rican Professional Baseball League (LBPPR), with the Leones de Ponce. During this period the team won five league championships. He finished his career with an average of .337, and had an average of 2.2 strikeouts per season, this included four consecutive seasons from 1939 to 1942, without any strikeouts. Coimbre also won two LBPPR batting titles and the league's Most Valuable Player Award in 1943.

Coimbre traveled to New York City, after completing his first professional season in Puerto Rico, where he joined the Porto Rico Stars baseball team of the Negro leagues. (Note: In those days the American government had changed the name of Puerto Rico to Porto Rico, pursuant to the Act of 17 May 1932.) Contracted by the New York Cubans, he played several seasons where his batting average remained over the .300 mark, including two seasons in which he batted over .400. While playing in the Negro leagues he was selected to play in the league's East–West All-Star games twice, where he played with several players who in the future would be elected to the Baseball Hall of Fame and Museum. He also played with teams established in Colombia, Venezuela, the Dominican Republic and Mexico. Following his retirement, Coimbre worked as a coach and manager of teams in both the professional and amateur leagues of Puerto Rico. Coimbre, who was eighty years old, died due to a fire at his home.

== Early years ==
Francisco Coimbre was born in Coamo, Puerto Rico, to Guillermo Coimbre and Zoila Atiles. He was one of five siblings, along Abelardo Aurelio, Cándido, Angela and Luisa. Coimbre was born at José I. Quintón Street in Coamo on January 29, 1909. Initially he lived with Cándido at Aguirre in Salinas. He was inscribed as a resident of Arroyo in his birth certificate, following a common practice at the time. In 1922, he moved to Ponce along his mother, in order to live closer to his sister, Angela Coimbre. He began attending Castillo School and developed an interest in inter-school tournaments. There he began playing baseball under the training and supervision of Miguel Caratini and Antonio Gordan, two hall of famers in the local league. On November 3, 1924, Coimbre won his first game as a pitcher with final scores of 5:2. At the age of 17, he played at the Parada 8 League hitting 4–5 in a game for Ponce against the San Juan Athletics.

His first accomplishments in sports were in track and field, where he competed in the 50-yard dash, eventually developing his skills in other aspects of the sport. He continued practicing this sport while attending high school. Later he was transferred to another educational institution in Caguas, Puerto Rico, but when he tried to participate in an athletic competition he was denied permission because he was classified in a different division on the records of Puerto Rico's Instruction Department. This event led to a court case which marked the first time in Puerto Rico that a court hearing was scheduled for a case involving sports. He subsequently transferred to Ponce High School, where the Instruction Department tried to have him removed of the athleticism team based on allegations that he had received payment as a student-athlete. Judge Roberto Tood Jr. determined that the evidence against Coimbre was insufficient during the hearing and the case was dropped.

== Baseball career ==
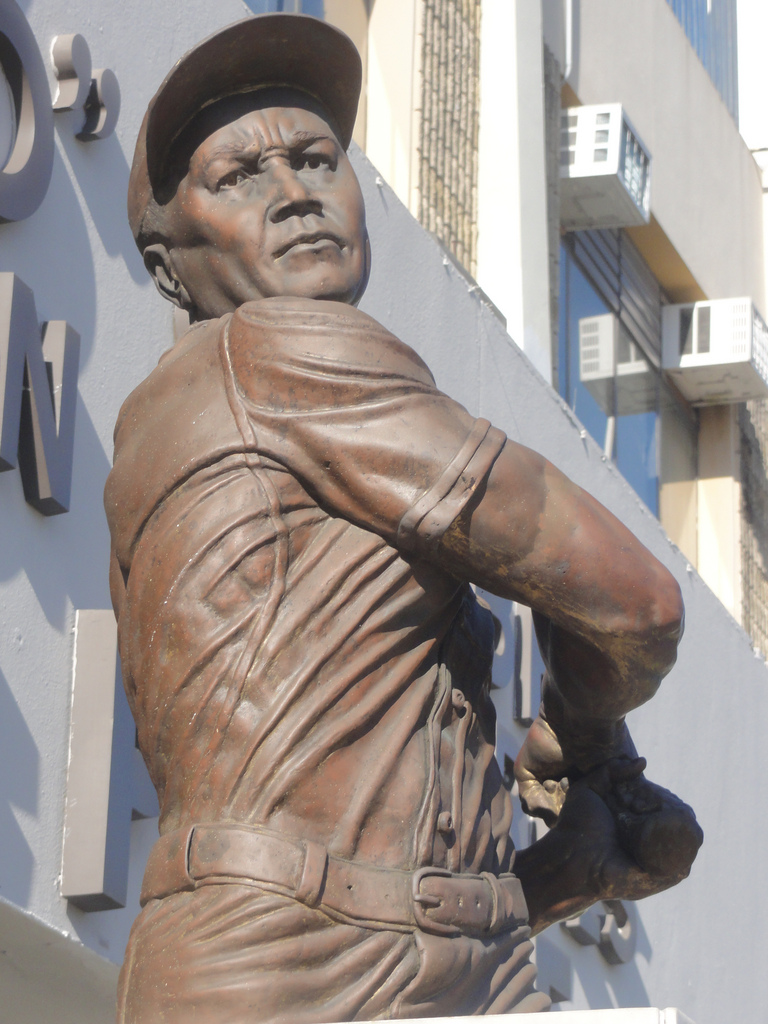
Bust of Francisco Pancho Coimbre, in front of the Francisco "Pancho" Coimbre Sports and Recreation Building, Ponce, Puerto Rico

In high school, Coimbre played at the positions of pitcher and second baseman, and he was recommended by a member of the Leones de Ponce to team officials. Leones de Ponce, the local team of the Puerto Rican amateur league, was about to play a series against the San Juan Athletics. Leones de Ponce needed additional players, and Coimbre was selected by team owner Pipo Maldonado and recruited by Millito Navarro. He debuted in a game at Ponce, starting as the right fielder, and recorded four hits in five at bats. Coimbre remained with the team and in 1928 participated in a championship series against Guayama, which Ponce won in six games. In the last game of the series, Coimbre pitched and won with a final score of 5–3, in a game which the team almost lost following an error.

Coimbre's first performance outside Puerto Rico was in the Dominican Republic, where he played for Sandino in Santiago de los Caballeros in 1927. He was accompanied by several Puerto Rican players during this stay. In 1929, he played in Venezuela for the "Magallanes", with appearances as a pitcher and outfielder. Four of his teammates, who now had homes in Caracas, had played with him in the Puerto Rican league. After a solid performance in the 1930 season of the amateur league, Coimbre was recruited by the Tigres del Licey team to play in the Dominican Republic; the Tigres were coached by Charles Dore. In 1931, Coímbre returned to Puerto Rico and joined the Caguas City. Following that season, he continued alternating between both leagues, also playing with Santo Domingo in 1931.

After the Puerto Rican league season came to an end in 1932, Coimbre went to work as a security guard in a penal institution and only played with a semi-professional team. Shortly after, he was offered a contract to play in La Guaira, with the Santa Marta club. The season concluded with Buchipluma, a second team owned by Santa Marta's proprietor, winning the league's championship. Following his time with Santa Marta, he continued playing, both in Puerto Rico and the Dominican Republic. While playing with Licey, the team developed a rivalry with El Escogido, which gave Coimbre an opportunity to establish relationships with several players, from both countries. During this period Licey continued to be coached by Dore, and included several well known Dominican players. The team won the league's championship, but Coimbre decided not to attend the award ceremony, choosing to stay in his hotel room instead. Dore took the trophy to Coimbre so that he could enjoy it for a while, but he rejected this and suggested that it be filled with money for a donation.

In 1935, Coimbre moved to Maracaibo where he played for Pastora, in Zulia's Stadium. The team reached the league's final series but lost to Magallanes. Prior to this series, the team had to travel to Caimbas, an industrial city where the games were scheduled. The usual mode of travel was by boat, but following Coimbre's advice, the team took an airplane. At season's end he moved to La Victoria, Aragua, where one of his friends resided in a hacienda. There he played in a series to determine the final roster of Concordia, a team that was going to travel to Puerto Rico. Coimbre participated in the series, but choose to play with Ponce instead of Concordia. In 1937, he returned to the Dominican Republic and his team won the league's championship; he described it as the "most powerful team in his memory".

=== Formation of the LBPPR and participation in Negro league baseball ===
Later in 1937, when he returned to Puerto Rico, Coimbre learned that the Liga de Béisbol Profesional de Puerto Rico (LBPPR) was being organized. The LBPPR elected Teófilo Maldonado, a press writer, as their president. Coimbre joined the Ponce-Kofresí team, which represented Ponce. The team was coached by Isidro Fabré and owned by Juan Luis Boscio, and the team's roster included several players known by the local fanbase, After the season's conclusion, Coimbre traveled to New York City for the first time in his life, after being invited by a close friend. Coimbre's original intention was to visit his sister, with whom he lived while in the city. In New York, he met Santiago Bartolomei who owned the Puerto Rico Stars (also known as "Puerto Rican Stars"). Bartolomei met with Coimbre and fellow players, and he offered Coimbre a contract to play with the team. He accepted and joined the team, which included players from Puerto Rico and Cuba.

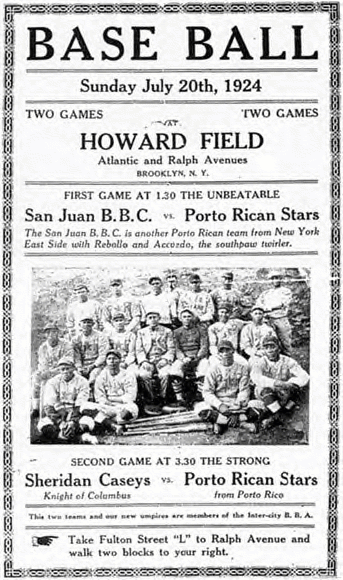
Early poster announcing a baseball game between the San Juan BBC and the Porto Rico Stars in New York

While he played for the Porto Rico Stars, Alejandro Pompéz made Coimbre an offer to play with the New York Cubans. Pompéz became interested in Coimbre after hearing several reviews of his work, but he was initially skeptical of these claims and was hesitant to offer a contract until a group of players recommended Coimbre. He debuted in a game against Buschwick in Brooklyn, New York. In his first two games, Coimbre connected for four hits, three singles and a double. Following this performance Pompéz informed him that he had made the team. After the season concluded he was instantly offered a second contract with the Cubans, now playing in the Negro National League. He also played with Ponce during the 1940–1941 season of the winter league, recording a batting average of .401 with no strikeouts. During his second season with the Cubans Coimbre had an average of .409, and was selected as an All-Star for the first time in his career.

Following this success, he returned to Puerto Rico and had a batting average of .372 for Ponce as they won their first LBPPR championship. The next season Coimbre won his first batting championship in the Puerto Rican Professional Baseball League, finishing at .342 after connecting for base hits in 22 consecutive games. In 1943, he had his best season in the U.S. Negro leagues and was selected to the East's All-Star team for a second time. He finished with a .428 average, the highest with the Cubans. Coimbre received a tribute at Yankee Stadium, where hundreds of Puerto Ricans reunited and awarded him a scroll and a ring recognizing his performance. Coimbre also led the LBPPR in runs batted in, with 27 RBIs. He was subsequently invited to play in the Liga Mexicana de Beisbol (Mexican Baseball League) for the first time in his career, and joined the Puebla club. Coimbre had problems adapting to Mexico's climate at first; however, his average improved over the course of the season and Coimbre finished among the league's leaders. Coimbre experienced a similar pattern in the 1944–1945 LBPPR season, where he was unable to record a hit in the first games, but finished with his second batting championship. He received a homage along Hiram Bithorn and Luis Rodríguez Olmo.

Later that year, Coimbre joined the El Torices team, located in Barranquilla, Colombia. His participation with the team mostly consisted of managing work since he was unable to play, due to a previous injury. During his time of inactivity, he worked in the Administration of Parks and Recreation, supervising softball games organized by local businessmen. A knee injury from an accidental pitch ended Coimbre's 1946 LBPPR season; the injury required hospitalization and recovery treatment. After recovering, Coimbre traveled to New York in 1948, seeking a contract from the Baltimore Elite Giants or the New York Black Yankees. During this visit he was contacted by Chebrook in the Canadian league, to play in right field.

Coimbre was not able to play in his full capacity, due on ongoing problems from his knee injury. He ended the season with a .316 average, as Chebrook won the league's championship. Coimbre spent the 1948–1951 seasons as a designated hitter in the LBPPR. His final season in the league was in 1952, playing right field and batting fourth in the lineup. Coimbre's last game was against the Cangrejeros de Santurce, where a wild pitch re-injured his knee, prompting his decision to retire as a player.

== Final years ==
=== Coaching and retirement ===
Following his retirement Coimbre began working as the coach of the Leones de Ponce, leading the team to two championships as well as extending his work to the Caribbean Series, a tournament where the champions of each Caribbean league participate. He received an invitation from the team owner of the Caguas-Guayama team, which was established in Panama, to work as the team manager. Coimbre also worked in the administration of the Indios de Mayagüez, when the team traveled to play in Havana, Cuba. He subsequently decided to work as a coach in the amateur league, while continuing his participation with the professional Ponce team and began coaching a team that represented Juana Díaz, Puerto Rico. Coimbre also managed youth baseball, coaching his own son Paco and several future professional players. He also served as instructor for a school.

Coimbre began promoting an idea that focused in the performance of the team, instead of the success of individual players. In his first day as an amateur coach, Coimbre summoned the players to a conference, where he noted that if all of them felt like "stars" and played for statistics their collective performance would suffer. He won a national championship with the team, but decided to leave it and work with the Cachorros de Ponce, where he won another championship. After retiring as a coach as well, Coimbre was known for attending the games and interacting with the public and figures from the professional league. He was often among the last to leave the venue. During this time he also worked as a talent scout with the Pittsburgh Pirates. As a scout he was directly responsible for the hiring of Roberto Clemente, when he urged the Pirates to draft him in the first draw of the Major League Baseball draft, even though Clemente was under a minor league contract with the Brooklyn Dodgers. He continued to work as a scout for the organization for 25 years.

Coimbre received several recognitions and was part of the inaugural class of the Salón de la Fama del Deporte Puertorriqueño in 1958. Prior to Polo Grounds' closure in 1964, he was invited to a game where Latin players from National and American leagues played. Coimbre was named "sportsman of the year" in Ecuador in 1966, also receiving a recognition as the "Father of Baseball". Another homage was held at the Broadway Casino in New York. Outside of coaching he had multiple jobs, including the role of representative of the Lotería de Puerto Rico. Coimbre also entered politics when he joined the Municipal Assembly of Ponce, filling a vacancy by substitution. He was later elected to a second term. The same entity had previously paid homage to him by naming a Department of Sports and Recreation building after him. In 1966, Coimbre created the Liga de los Old Timers, a master's category tournament. He also founded a baseball school named after him in 1974.

=== Death ===
On November 3, 1989, Coimbre attended a game where he was accompanied by Millito Navarro, Marzo Cabrera, Griffin Tirado, Papo Tirado, Luis Villodas, Carlos Lanauze and Rafael Dávila, among others. After the game and a birthday celebration, Navarro took him home. In the early morning of November 4, neighbors became aware of a fire consuming his house but were unable to assist him, being unable to breach the entrance. The flames originated in the house's kitchen while he was cooking, consuming the structure's wooden frame. When Coimbre tried to escape he was unable to open the front door, because he had locked it with a padlock. After the municipal firefighters were warned at 3:10 a.m. they forwarded the report to the station at Parque Central. Collectively they doused the fire by 6:00 a.m., recovering Coimbre's body from the room's floor, which was recognized by family members. The autopsy revealed that he died of smoke inhalation, had not suffered any fracture and was free of alcohol or other intoxicating substances.

News spread through the media and soon afterwards friends and the public at large arrived at the house. The firefighters argued among themselves as their assessments were contradictory, the chief argued that the fire had begun at a stove as one of its dials was stuck at the "On" position, while another noted that the traces left in the wood were more evident in another area of the house. A police officer recorded both melted hardware above the stove and that Coimbre used to light candles. The presence of another plate placed on top of the stove in the pan, whose contents were not burned, contradicted this theory. From his time playing in the Negro League, he had adopted the use of a product to straighten hair, which he continued using during his retirement along other products. This would later play a role when firefighters were able to positively identify his body due to its residues.

People close to Coimbre argued that while he used to light candles in an altar to honor Our Lady of Charity, he also turned them off before leaving. Among them were the neighbors and his grandson, Francisco III, who noted that two dials were missing from the stove and that he avoided using it. He also claimed that Coimbre had left the food for him and that in the past, an electricity post placed in front of the house had malfunctioned. The issues with the wiring were also noted by one of his neighbors. In 1999, Nelson García Santos reported irregularities in the management of the case by the fire department and Puerto Rico Electric Power Authority (PREPA). Coimbre was buried at Cementerio Civil de Ponce.

== Legacy ==
Ana M. Bussó began sculpting a monument of Coimbre shortly before his death, but at the moment he expressed preference for other forms of recognition such as help repairing his house. The City of Ponce honored his memory by naming its sports museum the "Museo Pancho Coímbre" when it inaugurated on January 21, 1992, at Ponce. The museum, which contains a large collection of sports memorabilia, is located on the Calle (Street) Lolita Tizol. Also, in Ponce, he is honored at the Park for the Illustrious Ponce Citizens. Also the building housing the Secretaría de Recreación y Deportes on Avenida Las Américas in Ponce is named "Francisco "Pancho" Coímbre". The town of Coamo also honored Coimbre by naming a sports complex "Complejo Deportivo Francisco Pancho Coimbre Park" after him. Abroad, his sister Carmen created the Pancho Coimbre League in Manhattan, New York. In 1999, Coimbre was selected as one of the best outfielders of the 20th century in the LBPPR.

== Personal life ==
Coimbre married Antonia Napoleoni Ricard in 1927, with their four sons being born at a house located in Estrella street at Ponce. Two of the children died young, while another, Rafael, died in 1960. They remained married until Napoleoni died on October 15, 1978. Coimbre remained alone, living in the same house afterwards and being aided by Paco during his old age. Of his sons, Francisco Jr. or “Paco”, was the one to follow in his footsteps excelling at athletics and playing for the Leones. His grandson, of the same name, lived there for some time. He was nicknamed "El Pundonoroso" (lit. "the punctilious") by league president Pedro Vázquez, "Mister Klain" (due to his batting stance) by the import players and "Frank" by Joe O’Tode. Hall of Famer Roberto Clemente was a longtime fan and considered Coimbre the best player he had ever seen to come out of Puerto Rico. Satchel Paige was quoted stating that he was the "toughest hitter [Page] ever faced."

== See also ==
- List of Puerto Ricans
- List of Negro league baseball players
- Black history in Puerto Rico

== Bibliography ==
- García Santos, Nelson (1999). Coímbre: El Pundonoroso (in Spanish). Municipio Autónomo de Ponce.
- Muratti Nieves, Daliana (2006). Chaguín Muratti: Un receptor del béisbol romántico puertorriqueño. Asociación de Periodistas de Puerto Rico. ISBN 1596082720.
