= Secretaría de Recreación y Deportes Francisco "Pancho" Coimbre =

Sports complex located in Ponce, Puerto Rico

Coordinates: 18°0′14.9754″N 66°37′44.724″W

- Secretaría de Recreación y Deportes
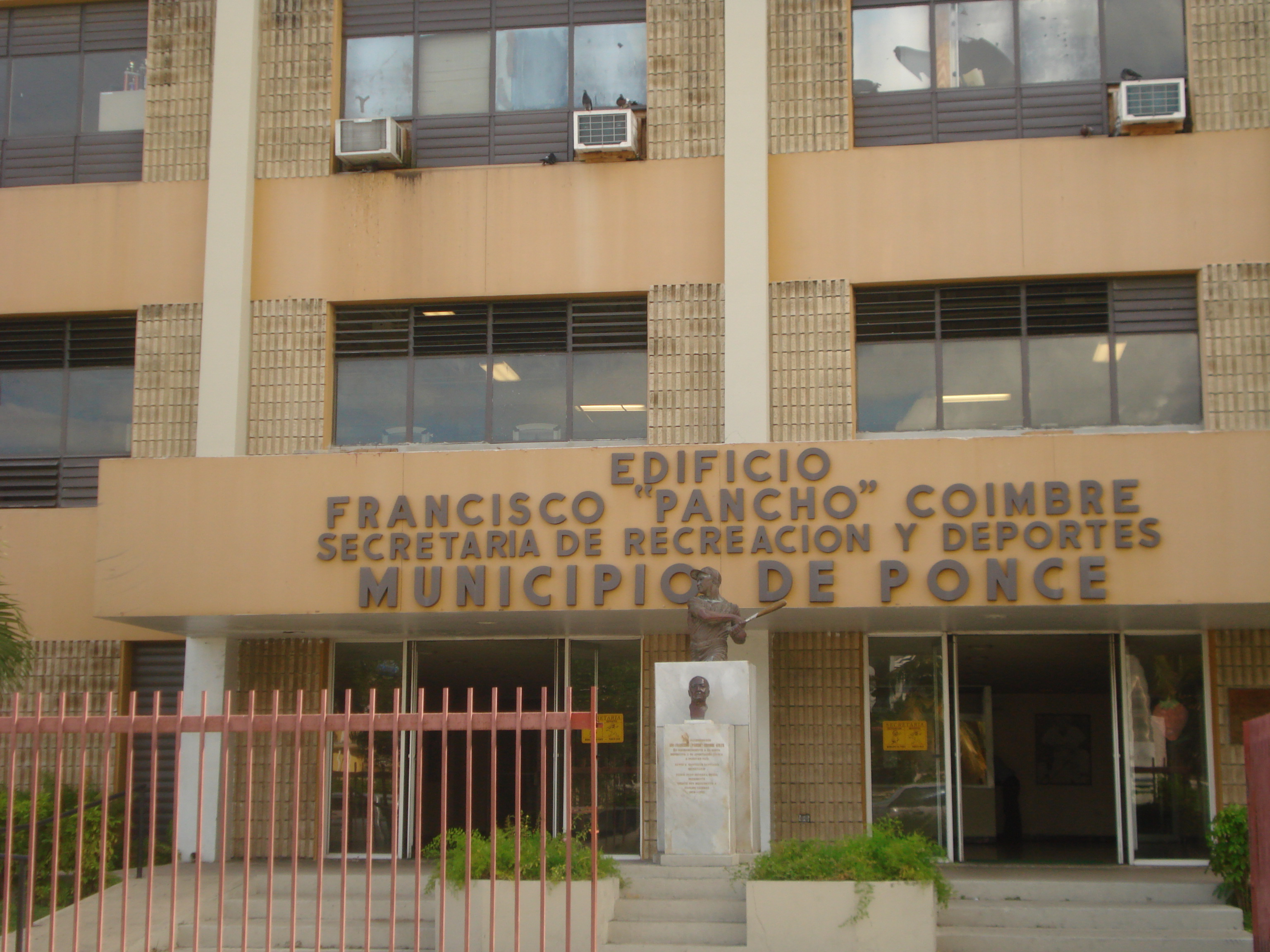
- Main entrance to the Secretaría de Recreación y Deportes
- Interactive map of Secretaría de Recreación y Deportes Francisco "Pancho" Coimbre
- Location: Ponce, Puerto Rico
- Owner: Municipality of Ponce
- Operator: Municipality of Ponce

Construction
- Opened: February 10, 1980

Secretaría de Recreación y Deportes Francisco "Pancho" Coimbre is a sports complex, located on Avenida Las Americas in Ponce, Puerto Rico. It features a 3-story gymnasium building, a gazebo, and a natatorium. It was named "Francisco 'Pancho' Coimbre" in April 1990 in honor of the Ponce baseball star.

== History ==
The idea of a sports complex was conceived by three Ponce athletes, sports enthusiasts and then Oficina Municipal de Deportes (Municipal Sports Bureau). José Antonnetti, Pedro and Jorge Negron Archeval are names that will be linked to the Secretaria de Recreacion y Deportes and the history of Ponce sports. Ten years later, in 1990, the main building was named after Francisco "Pancho" Coimbre, to the memory of the Ponce baseball player. On 7 February 1980, construction work was completed for the structure to house the administrative headquarters and recreational facilities of the Secretaría de Recreación y Deportes of the municipality of Ponce. Ten years after its opening, in April 1990, it was named "Francisco 'Pancho' Coimbre" in honor of the Ponce baseball star.

== Location ==
The building is located at the southwest corner of Avenida Las Americas and PR-2 in Ponce, Puerto Rico. The facilities were inaugurated on 10 February 1980. Its location next to Estadio Paquito Montaner and Coliseo Pachín Vicéns turned the area into the professional sports center of the city.
