= George Scales =

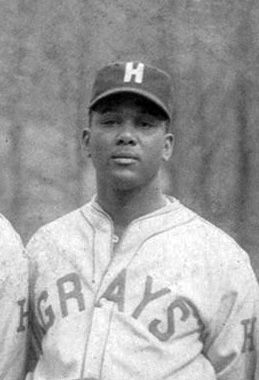
- Second baseman / Manager
- Born: August 16, 1900; Talladega, Alabama, U.S.
- Died: April 15, 1976 (aged 75); Compton, California, U.S.
- Batted: Right Threw: Right

Negro leagues debut
- 1921, for the St. Louis Giants

Last Negro leagues appearance
- 1946, for the Baltimore Elite Giants

Negro leagues (Note: On December 16, 2020, Major League Baseball declared certain Negro leagues, from the span of 1920–1948, to be "major" leagues. Scales' statistics reflect his time in the Negro leagues from 1921–1929, 1935–1936, and from 1938 until the end of his career.) statistics
- Batting average: .320
- Home runs: 64
- Runs scored: 499
- Managerial record: 81–106–10
- Winning percentage: .433

Teams
- As Player: St. Louis Giants (1921–1923); Lincoln Giants (1923–1929); Newark Stars (1926); Homestead Grays (1929–1931, 1935); New York Black Yankees (1932–1934, 1936, 1939, 1945); Baltimore Elite Giants (1938–1944, 1946); As Manager: New York Black Yankees (1932–1934, 1939, 1945); Baltimore Elite Giants (1938, 1943, 1947)

Career highlights and awards
- Negro National League pennant (1939)

George Louis Scales (August 16, 1900 - April 15, 1976), nicknamed "Tubby", was an American second baseman and manager in Negro league baseball, most notably with the New York Lincoln Giants and Baltimore Elite Giants. Born in Talladega, Alabama, he batted .320 over a 25-year career during which he played several positions. He also managed for twelve seasons in the Puerto Rican Winter League, winning six pennants, and led the Caribbean World Series champions in 1951.

== Career ==
Buck Leonard claimed that George Scales was the best curveball hitter he ever saw.

At age 52, Scales received votes listing him on the 1952 Pittsburgh Courier player-voted poll of the Negro leagues' best players ever.

After retiring from baseball in 1958, he became a stockbroker. He died at age 75 in Compton, California.

Scales was among 39 final candidates considered for the Baseball Hall of Fame's Class of 2006 by the Committee on African-American Baseball, however he was not among the 17 elected.

On November 5, 2021, he was selected to the final ballot for the Baseball Hall of Fame's Early Days Committee for consideration in the Class of 2022. He received four of the necessary twelve votes.
