= Tiburones de Aguadilla =

- Logo

Information
- League: LBPPR
- Location: Aguadilla, Puerto Rico
- Ballpark: Luis A. Canena Marquez Stadium

Current uniforms
Home	Away

The Tiburones de Aguadilla (English: Aguadilla Sharks) were a baseball team in Puerto Rico's Liga de Béisbol Profesional Roberto Clemente (English: Roberto Clemente Professional Baseball League). They were based in Aguadilla.

The National Baseball Hall of Fame and Museum plaque of the Negro leagues star Leon Day, elected in 1995, depicts him wearing an Aguadilla Sharks cap. It is the only case in which a plaque features a cap from a league different from the National League, the American League or the Negro leagues.
