= Estadio Luis Rodríguez Olmo =

Multi-use stadium in Arecibo, Puerto Rico

Coordinates: 18.457823°N 66.722176°W

Estadio Luis Rodríguez Olmo was a multi-use stadium in Arecibo, Puerto Rico. It was used mostly for baseball games and was the home of Lobos de Arecibo. The stadium held approximately 9,000 people. Following the 2009-2010 winter league season, the anchor tenant was lost, the stadium was closed, and has since fallen into disrepair.

Responsibility for the stadium remained trapped between state entities (the Department of Recreation and Sports) and municipal authorities, with neither side allocating funds for repairs or upkeep.According to WAPA TV reports, the structure has suffered severe decay, leading local officials to suggest that the facility is beyond saving and may need to be demolished.
