= Andy González (baseball) =

Puerto Rican baseball player and coach (born 1981)

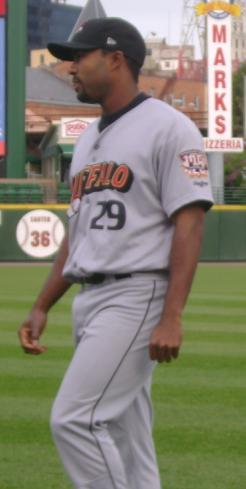
- González with the Buffalo Bisons

Colorado Rockies – No. 70
- Outfielder / Third baseman / Coach
- Born: December 15, 1981 (age 44); Río Piedras, Puerto Rico
- Batted: Right Threw: Right

MLB debut
- April 25, 2007, for the Chicago White Sox

Last MLB appearance
- October 3, 2009, for the Florida Marlins

MLB statistics
- Batting average: .182
- Home runs: 3
- Runs batted in: 13
- Stats at Baseball Reference

Teams
- As player: Chicago White Sox (2007); Cleveland Indians (2008); Florida Marlins (2009); As coach: Colorado Rockies (2022–present)
Medals
Representing Puerto Rico
Men's baseball
World Baseball Classic
Silver medal – second place	2013 San Francisco	Team

Angel Manuel "Andy" González (born December 15, 1981) is a Puerto Rican former professional baseball outfielder, third baseman and the current assistant hitting coach for the Colorado Rockies of Major League Baseball (MLB). He played professionally for the Chicago White Sox, Cleveland Indians, and Florida Marlins.

== Career ==
González was drafted by the Chicago White Sox in the fifth round (163rd overall) of the 2001 Major League Baseball draft. He made his professional debut that year with the Gulf Coast League White Sox, where he was a Gulf Coast League All-Star at shortstop. He finished with a .323 batting average, five home runs and 30 RBI in 48 games.

After steadily advancing through Chicago's minor league system, González was recalled by the White Sox and made his major league debut on April 25, 2007. He finished the game 0-for-1 with a walk in Chicago's 6–2 win over the Detroit Tigers. In 189 at bats in the majors in 2007, González batted only .185 with two home runs and 11 RBI in 67 games. After the season, the White Sox did not tender González a contract, making him a free agent.

On December 21, 2007, González signed a minor league contract with the Cleveland Indians with an invitation to spring training. After not making the team out of spring training, González began the 2008 season with the Triple-A Buffalo Bisons, where he batted .242 with seven home runs and 35 RBI in 83 games. He was called up to the majors on July 26 to fill the roster following the trade of Casey Blake. In 10 games with Cleveland, González hit .208 with a home run and 2 RBI before being designated for assignment on August 29. He became a free agent at the end of the season.

In January 2009, González signed a minor league contract with the Florida Marlins. He made the team out of spring training, and was added to the major league roster on April 4, 2009. However, he did not appear in a game before being sent to the Triple-A New Orleans Zephyrs on April 12. He was recalled again on July 8, and hit a triple in his first at bat with the team on July 9. González was optioned to New Orleans on July 20, and designated for assignment on July 31. On October 9, the Marlins outrighted him to New Orleans and he opted for free agency.

On April 29, 2010, the Sussex Skyhawks signed González. He signed a minor league deal with the Milwaukee Brewers on April 30, 2011.

=== Puerto Rico Baseball League ===
In 2008, González played with the Leones de Ponce of the Puerto Rico Baseball League. He won the league's regular season batting championship. Registering an average of .387 in 41 games played. In the semifinals, González had an average of .313 with one RBI.

== Post-playing career ==
In November 2020, González was named the first manager of RA12.

On December 14, 2021, González was hired by the Colorado Rockies as an assistant hitting coach for the 2022 season.

== Personal ==
González attended Florida Air Academy in Melbourne, Florida.

== See also ==
- List of Major League Baseball players from Puerto Rico
