= Lobos de Arecibo =

Baseball team in Arecibo, Puerto Rico

Information
- League: LBPRR
- Location: Arecibo, Puerto Rico
- Ballpark: Estadio Luis Rodríguez Olmo
- Caribbean World Series championships: 1983
- League championships: 1983, 1996

Current uniforms
Home	Away

Lobos de Arecibo (English: Wolves) were a professional baseball team in the Puerto Rican Professional Baseball League, based in Arecibo. The Lobos won the 1983 national baseball championship and the 1983 Caribbean World Series, the only time the franchise won both titles.

== History ==
The franchise first appeared in the 1960–61 season, managed by former major leaguer Luis Rodriguez Olmo.

The ‘Lobos’ could not participate in the 1981–82 season, and requested a recess. Their players were allowed to be drafted by the other teams, on the condition that they would be returned to Arecibo if the ‘Lobos’ were to play the following season.

The team filed for returning to play the following season (1982–83), which required a vote from the other team owners. Jose ‘Chiro’ Cangiano, then the owner of the Leones de Ponce, led a movement to block Arecibo from returning, since he would benefit from former Lobos players, such as pitcher Edwin Nuñez, who had a stellar season playing with Ponce. On the day of the voting, Cangiano could not arrive to San Juan in time for the meeting. His representative, who had not received instructions on how to vote, voted in favor of Arecibo returning, and thus the Lobos were back on the league. Nuñez was later traded to the Leones. That same season, the Lobos defeated the Leones in the final, 4 games to 3, to capture their first title. They also captured the Caribbean Series title in Venezuela.

The Lobos won the national baseball championship again in 1996, a team that included New York Yankees outfielder Bernie Williams, and Milwaukee Brewers catcher Mike Matheny; but finished second in the Caribbean Series, which was won in Mexico by the Tomateros de Culiacán.

The Lobos ceased operation in 1999.

== Return of the Lobos ==
After six years without the team, Arecibo saw the return of the Lobos in 2005. The team had spent that time in various cities, under names like the San Juan Senators and even one year with the historic moniker of the Cangrejeros de Santurce. But for the 2005–2006 season, the team was acquired by a sports-loving local doctor who, with his fellow townsfolk in mind, returned the team to its rightful place.

Facing only 28 days in which to prepare the Luis Rodriguez Olmo stadium for play after six years of neglect, the citizens of Arecibo, together with state and local officials, performed what has been known as the "Milagro Lobo" or the miracle of the wolf, returning its infrastructure to more than acceptable conditions in such a short period of time.

== Puerto Rico Baseball League ==
On November 18, 2009, the Lobos defeated the Indios. A scheduled game against the Leones del Escogido was suspended due to rain. On November 29, 2009, the Lobos lost to the Águilas Cibaeñas in inter-league action. The following night, the team won their eight game of the season, defeating the Leones del Escogido. In the third game of this inter-league series, the Lobos defeated the Estrellas Orientales. During the trade stage, the team's general manager, Pachy Rodríguez, expressed satisfaction with the acquisition of Héctor Pellot from the Criollos in exchange for Adrián Ortiz.

The Lobos de Arecibo have not been active since the 2009–2010 season.
