= Roberto Clemente Professional Baseball League =

Professional baseball league in Puerto Rico

- The league’s logo depicts Clemente hitting his 3,000th MLB hit superimposed on the flag of Puerto Rico and his lifelong uniform number
- Formerly: Liga de Béisbol Profesional de Puerto Rico (1938–2007); Puerto Rico Baseball League (2008–2012)
- Sport: Baseball
- Founded: July 29, 1938; 88 years ago
- First season: September 13, 1938
- President: Juan Antonio Flores Galarza
- No. of teams: 6
- Country: Puerto Rico
- Confederation: CPBC; WBSC Americas
- Continent: North America
- Most recent champions: Cangrejeros de Santurce (17th title)
- Most titles: Criollos de Caguas (21 titles)
- Broadcaster: WAPA TV
- Related competitions: Caribbean Series
- Website: ligapr.com (in Spanish)

The Roberto Clemente Professional Baseball League (Spanish: Liga de Béisbol Profesional Roberto Clemente, abbreviation; LBPRC) is the main professional baseball league in Puerto Rico; it is colloquially referred to as the Puerto Rican Winter League. Consisting of six teams as of the 2023–24 season, the league's champion participates in the Caribbean Series.

The league was founded as Liga de Béisbol Profesional de Puerto Rico in 1938. In 2007, the league suspended operations for the first time since its creation; it resumed operations in 2008 after restructuring and changing its name to Puerto Rico Baseball League (PRBL). In May 2012, the league debuted its current name, choosing to honor Baseball Hall of Fame inductee Roberto Clemente by naming it after him and adopting his philosophy of athletic development.

== Inception and Béisbol Romántico (1938–1970) ==
Puerto Rican Baseball began at the end of the 19th century. The first two clubs were founded in 1897: the Almendares Baseball Club owned by Francisco Alamo Armas, and the Borinquen Baseball Club owned by Santos Filippi. According to El País newspaper, the first game was played on January 11, 1898, at the old velodrome in Santurce, San Juan. The Borinquen beat the Almendares 3 to 0. The first game to complete nine innings was played on January 30, 1898, when the Borinquen beat the Almendares again, 9 to 3. Enrique Huyke, a professor from Mayagüez, originally suggested the establishment of an organized baseball league in Puerto Rico. The idea was adopted by Teofilo Maldonado, president of the Commission on Recreation and Sports. A third party, Gabriel Castro, helped Huyke with the scouting of organizations which had to pay a thousand dollars prior to being admitted, while independent entities like the Guayama Rotary Club collaborated in raising funds for the teams. The Liga de Béisbol Semiprofesional de Puerto Rico (LBSPR) was founded in 1938, as a semi-professional league. Six teams formed the new organization; these were the Senadores de San Juan, Leones de Ponce, Criollos de Caguas, Brujos de Guayama and Grises Orientales de Humacao. The first Puerto Rican players to play in Major League Baseball, Hiram Bithorn and Luis Olmo, were active on the rosters of San Juan and Caguas. Bithorn became the youngest manager in the league's history, receiving the office when he was 22 years old. Huyke served as manager for Mayagüez for less than a month, because the team's owner threatened to remove its entry if he did not take the office. Maldonado was named the league's commissioner.

Changes in the rosters were allowed only during the first half of the season, meeting a deadline before the beginning of the second half. While the number of games has historically varied from 40 to 80 games per season. The All-Star game was scheduled to coincide with the traditional Three Kings Day, an idea suggested by Angel Colon so that the proceeds could be used to buy toys. This date was used for decades, until the emergence of television forced the league to comply with the dates requested by the networks. One of the main figures of the league in its early stage was Negro leagues veteran Emilio Navarro. The Cangrejeros de Santurce and Tiburones de Aguadilla joined the original teams in the 1939–40 season. On January 8, 1939, Humacao and San Juan played an 18-inning game that lasted four hours, establishing a record. Between 1938 and 1941, the LBSPR was part of the National Semi-Professional Baseball Congress, with titleholder Guayama facing the champions of the Congress' United States branch in a best-of-seven series in 1939, where they defeated the Duncan Cementers, and again in 1940, with a roster that included the league's Most Valuable Player, Satchel Paige. In 1939–40, Perucho Cepeda, the defending batting champion, won the league's batting title over Josh Gibson, who won it the following season.

The Criollos de Caguas won their first championship in 1940–41, defeating the Cangrejeros in the final series. Santurce's Luis Cabrera was the last player to win the LBSPR's Most Valuable Player award. On September 14, 1941, Rafael Delgado Márquez proposed that the league was renamed to Liga de Béisbol Profesional de Puerto Rico (LBPPR), effectively moving the league towards professionalism. A format of vueltas (halves) was adopted since the league's creation, where the winners of each vuelta facing each other for the championship. However, Ponce managed to win three consecutive championships (1941–1945) without having to participate in a final by winning both vueltas. Consequently, the fans of teams that were mathematically eliminated by this format lost interest in the tournament. Some players also concluded their participation in the season after the teams were eliminated. To deal with this issue, the league established a new playoff format, where the top four teams were included.

Francisco Coimbre was a key member of Ponce's success with his offense, winning two batting championships, establishing a league record for most consecutive games with hits and not recording a single strikeout in three consecutive seasons (1939–42). The consistency of his performances earned him a Most Valuable Player award. Other players that participated for Ponce included Juan Guilbe Colon (June 26, 1914 - April 29, 1994) and Griffin Tirado. Coimbre and Pedro Cepeda batted over .400 in more than one season, joining Tomás Quiñones, Juan Sánchez and Rafaelito Ortiz as the local stars of the league.

World War II affected the league directly, reducing the 1942–43 season's length with only four active teams. This number of teams continued until 1946, while the rule that allowed the participation of three imported players per team, was suspended from 1942 to 1944. In the 1944–45 season, Canena Marquez debuted in the league establishing a record of highest batting average for a rookie with .361, fulfilling the minimum required at-bats. The Senadores de San Juan won their first championship on 1945–46, defeating the Indios in the finals. During this season, Joe Buzas became the first foreign MLB player to manage in the LBPPR. Tomas “Planchardon” Quiñones won two back-to-back Most Valuable Player awards from 1943 to 1945. In 1947, the league's team participated in a series of five games against the New York Yankees, which featured Ponce defeating the visiting team. Jose "Pantalones" Santiago debuted in this season, earning the Rookie of the Year recognition while Canena Marquez broke Josh Gibson's home run record of 13. Vic Power made his debut for the Criollos on the 1947–48 season, in which the team won the league's title with a roster that included Ortiz, who was the only pitcher to win 10 or more games for three LBPPR teams.

Mayaguez won the 1948–49 championship with a roster that included Canena Marquez and Luke Easter. That same year, the LBPPR joined the Caribbean Series, beginning a rivalry with the Cuban League's champion that lasted throughout the next decade, until Cuba ceased to participate in the event. A decade after its foundation, the league was employing an 80-game schedule. Several new ballparks have been built by the 1949–50 season, this was due to an attendance average of 750,000. Each of the stadiums built surpassed 6,000 seats, with Ponce's Paquito Mountaner reaching 9,718 seats by then. The installation of lights that allowed the organizations of games at night increased attendance. Estadio Sixto Escobar had a maximum capacity of over 15,000, with 13,135 seats. Percucho Cepeda was one of the league's dominant figures during the 1940s, winning two batting championships and a Most Valuable Player award. Natalio Irizarry won the league's Rookie of the Year recognition in 1949–50.

From 1949 to 1955, the league featured the participation of new MLB players, including Johnny Logan, Harvey Haddix and Hank Aaron among several others. The players began choosing the league to play due to its competitive level and warm climate during the winter, a custom that has continued until the current decade. Players of the Negro leagues preferred it due to lack of racism towards the players, as opposed to the United States. Between 1939 and 1951, a total of 5,224,506 fans attended the LBPPR games. During this time, Luis Raúl Cabrera became the first pitcher to reach 100 wins in the LBPPR.

=== Emergence of Clemente and Cepeda ===
In 1952, Roberto Clemente made his debut with the Cangrejeros hitting .234. He was signed by Pedrin Zorilla, debuting in the league as a teenager. The team won that year's title and Cot Deal was named MVP. Clemente improved this average to .288 the following season, but Santurce finished last in the league. The league's champions were the Criollos, who also won the Caribbean Series. With a roster that also included Luis Olmo, Willy Mays and Ruben Gomez, the Cangrejeros won the 1954–55 championship defeating Caguas in the finals, 4–1. During this season, Clemente became the first Puerto Rican player to hit two home runs in the league's All-Star game. The team also went on to win the Caribbean Series, which were held in Venezuela. Jim Rivera hand an average of .450 and was named MVP. Puerto Rican fans received the team with a parade upon landing and Luis Muñoz Marín welcomed them in La Fortaleza. In 1955–56, the Criollos won the league's championship, in a season that marked Orlando Cepeda's debut in the league. Clemente won the season's batting championship with an average of .396. In 1956–57, the league's championship was won by the Indios. During this season, Clemente went on to break the league's record for most games with hits, previously established by Francisco Coimbre in 1943–44. The following season, the Criollos defeated the Cangrejeros to win the championship. Clemente who now played for Caguas, hit .529 during the final series. Juan "Terin" Pizarro won the Most Valuable Player Award, leading the league in wins, ERA, best win-to-loss margin and pitched the LBPPR's seventh no-hitter. In the Caribbean Series, he defeated Carta Vieja of Panama (8:0), recording 17 strikeouts. Both teams traded the final two championships of the decade. The 1959–60 season marked the first instance that LBPPR games were transmitted in two languages through radio. The Criollos won the championship, while Mayaguez's Ramon Luis Conde won the Most Valuable Player Award. During the 1950s, Puerto Rico's economy experienced significant growth, which propitiated baseball-related gambling. This tendency experienced a notable increase in the early 1960s.

Other changes were experienced in the game's style with the introduction of more player-managers, such as Luis Olmo's, who became the first to consistently employ pitching coaches and closers in the league. Vic Power used other unusual managing techniques, such as using Frank Howard as a relief pitcher as well as becoming the first player-manager to sit himself in favor of a pinch hitter, replacing his turn in the lineup with Herminio Cortes. After the Cuban Revolution, hotels and casinos in San Juan benefited from Havana's economic decay. During this timeframe, Puerto Rico expanded its presence in the Caribbean, and a native team frequently played against a representation of St. Thomas and Saint Croix in February. Julio Navarro was drafted from one of these exhibitions, eventually becoming one of the league's dominant pitchers. The Dominican Winter League was still not a member of the Caribbean Confederation back then, which allowed uncommon interleague trades between it and the LBPPR, which would have more trouble negotiating such deals with member leagues. During this decade, some of the league's teams would provide import players with houses and taxis for transportation. The Senadores de San Juan, led by Clemente, who had just won the MLB World Series with Pittsburgh, won the league's 1960–61 season, as well as Jose Santiago, who recorded a record of 10–2 with an ERA of 2.44 for the team. Luis "Tite" Arroyo won the season's Most Valuable Player award, registering a record of 10–2 with an ERA of 1.64. Due to political tension, the Caribbean Series that were planned to take place in Habana were cancelled. The event was replaced by the Interamerican Series, which San Juan attended with a roster that included pitcher Florentino Rivera.

The Interamerican Series were held three more times, with each team winning the one held in their home field. Mayaguez did so in 1963, in a series where Terin Pizarro recorded the only no-hitter in the history of the event, in a win over Valencia at the opening night. In 1961–62, the Lobos de Arecibo joined the league as an expansion team. On January 14, 1962, Julio Navarro pitched the first regular season no-hitter. For the 1962–63 season, Estadio Sixto Escobar was replaced by the Hiram Bithorn Stadium, with a capacity of 20,000 seats by then. In 1963–64, Clemente finished second with a batting average of .345, leading the Senadores to the title. San Juan once again played in the Interamerican Series, held in Nicaragua. In 1964–65, Orlando Cepeda joined the Cangrejeros, replacing Jim Beauchamp helping the team win the league's championship. During this season, Clemente was named San Juan' player-manager, leading them to the playoffs. The All-Star game featured a format where Latin American players faced North American players. The following season featured the debut of Jerry Morales who won the league's Rookie of the Year recognition after participating for Puerto Rico's national baseball team in the 1966 Central American and Caribbean Games. Carlos Bernier retired in 1966, having won five stolen base titles for a total of 285. On November 20, 1966, San Juan's Luis de Leon pitched the first perfect game in the league's history. Caguas won the league's championship in 1967–68. Nino Escalera, who finished his career third on the league's hit list, replaced Vic Power as the team's manager during this season. On December 20, 1969, Santurce and Arecibo participated in the only LBPPR game played outside of Puerto Rico, held in the United States Virgin Islands to honor Elrod Hendricks.

== Increase of native international players (1970–2000) ==
Ponce won the second of back-to-back championships in 1969–70 as well as the Caribbean Series' title being led in both by Conde's offensive. Wayne Simpson was selected MVP. The Cangrejeros won the 1970–71 championship, defeating the Criollos in the finals. Ponce's Santos Alomar Sr. won the league's batting championship and was named MVP, while Willie Montañez of Caguas led the league in home runs after recording 30 in Major League Baseball. Clemente returned to serve as San Juan's manager for the season, naming Nino Escalera as his coach. He only accepted the work for a year, expecting Escalera to replace him during the following season. The team advanced to the playoffs, losing their series against Santurce. Clemente also managed Puerto Rico to a win in the All-Star game, which featured a format of natives versus foreign players. He was succeeded as Santurce's manager by Frank Robinson on the 1971–72 season. Ruben Gomez also performed in the office temporarily, while Robinson attended a tour in Japan with Baltimore. The Cangrejeros won the 1972–73 title. That season's All-Star game was dedicated in Clemente's honor, who died a week before while transporting supplies to victims of the 1972 Nicaragua earthquake. Both native and foreign players wore a black band on their arms to symbolize grief.

The Criollos won the 1973–74 championship, possessing the league's strongest native lineup. Jerry Morales led the team, hitting 14 home runs as Caguas' lead-off hitter. Eduardo Figueroa led the league in wins on back-to-back seasons, recording 10-3 twice from 1973 to 1975. This was the first year that the league employed the designated hitter rule, including the position in the batting lineups. Gomez who had continued pitching for Santurce, retired in the 1975–76 season. By this time, he has played for nine champion teams and worked under nine managers. The Crillos won the 1976–77 championship, being led by the league's MVP, Jose Cruz. The Indios won the title the following season with a lineup that included MVP Kurt Bevaqua and went on to win the Caribbean Series held in Mazatlan, Mexico, Jose Manuel Morales leading all batters with a .421 average. Caguas won its ninth championship in the 1978–79 season. Jose Cruz, along with his two brothers Cirilo and Hector, represented the team in the Caribbean Series. Bayamón won the last championship of this decade, with a roster that included the batting champion, Dave Bergman.

=== Reemergence in the Caribbean Series ===
Coming back from a fourth-place regular season finish, the Criollos won their tenth championship in the 1980–81 season, but the Caribbean Series were not held that year. On January 2, 1981, Rickey Henderson established a new stolen bases record with 42. Orlando Gomez made his debut as a manager for Mayaguez and won the Manager of the Year award. Dickie Thon won the first of two back-to-back batting titles this season. This also marked Alomar Sr.'s last active season, retiring forth on the fourth place of league's all-time hit leaders. In 1981–82, the Lobos de Arecibo recessed and their native star players, Edwin Nuñez, Candy Maldonado and Ramón Avilés were drafted by the remaining teams. The team returned the following season, winning the franchise's first championship. The team won the 1983 Caribbean Series, receiving a large welcoming ceremony at Muñoz Marin Airport that included a parade from San Juan to Arecibo. Maldonado, who became the third native player to hit two home runs in an All-Star game, along with Clemente and Ismael Oquendo, was included in the Series' All Star team after recording a .348 average. In the 1974–75 season, the Senadores de San Juan were moved to Bayamón, being renamed Vaqueros de Bayamón. From 1974 to 1983, the team hosted their games in Estadio Juan Ramon Loubriel, which has 16,000 seats. Bayamon's Carmelo Martinez was selected MVP. Mayaguez won the 1983–84 season, with Santurce's Jerry Willard being selected MVP. Besides this, the players were rewarded with a cruise trip and met the Governor of Puerto Rico. Eduardo Figueroa led the league in ERA, winning the recognition of Comeback Player of the Year. For the 1984–85 season, the Vaqueros were moved back to San Juan and re-adopted their original name, Senadores de San Juan.

However, one year later they were rechristened as the Metros de San Juan, a name that they retained until 1994. The team won the LBPPR title that season. The team also won the Caribbean Series being led by Francisco Javier Oliveras, who won a game in the series and had previously recorded eight regular-season wins and one in the semifinals. Henry Cotto of Caguas was selected the league's MVP. Rúben Sierra debuted for Santurce and won the league's Rookie of the Year award. One of Puerto Rico's most successful managers, Mako Oliveras, made his managing debut in December 1984, subsequently becoming responsible for giving playing time to unknown prospects such as Benito Santiago, Edgar Martinez and Carlos Baerga, all of which would go on to become stars. Mayaguez won the 1985–86 championship. This marked Roberto Alomar's debut in the LBPPR, debuting for the Criollos after being drafted by Arecibo while in high school. Caguas won the 1986–87 championship, the team went on to win the Caribbean Series, featuring a native lineup that included Alomar, Carmelo Martinez, Edgar Diaz, German Rivera, Henry Cotto, Orlando Mercado and Heidi Vargas. This was Jose Cruz's final year in the league, having amassed 119 home runs, 40 for the Leones and 70 with Caguas, finishing second in the all-time list. The Indios de Mayagüez won the 1985–86 season, being led by Luis Quiñones' three home runs in the finals over San Juan. Caguas won the 1986–87 championship and their third Caribbean Series‘ title, being led by a lineup that included Cotto and Oliveras. Mayagüez won the first of back to back titles in 1987–88. This year the All-Star Game commemorated the league's 50th anniversary, being dedicated to Angel Colon. The Metro region defeated the Island region, 1:0. Mayaguez won the 1988–89 title, once again being led by Quiñones‘ clutch hitting. Javier Lopez debuted in 1988, winning the league's Rookie of the Year recognition.

=== Rivalry with LBPRD and "Dream Team" ===
San Juan won the championship in the 1989–90 season. The season featured the debut of Juan González, who under the initiative of that season's Manager of the Year, Ramón Aviles, played every game with Caguas, finishing second in home runs with 9 and RBIs with 34. He was traded for Alomar during the off-season. Gonzalez also reinforced San Juan, recording two home runs in the Caribbean Series. Carlos Baerga and Edgar Martinez were named co-MVPs. Martinez became the first player in 41 seasons to win the batting crown with an average above.400, registering .424. Santurce won the title the following year, which featured the debut of Wil Cordero, who was named Rookie of the Year. In the 1991–1992 season, the Criollos de Caguas franchise was moved to Bayamón, but experienced low attendance in that municipality. Due to this, their star players, Juan González and Iván Rodríguez, were drafted by Santurce and Mayagüez respectively. The Indios won that season's championship and the Caribbean Series held in Mexico, with Chad Kreuter winning the series' MVP award. Roberto Hernandez won a tie-breaker with Venezuela to secure the series. Cordero was recognized as the league's MVP. The 1992–93 season featured the return of Dickie Thon to the league, who led Santurce to a championship over San Juan in the finals as well as the debut of Jose Cruz as a manager. The finals series featured both Thon and Juan González, which attracted 90,369 fans throughout six games, including a record of 23,701 in the last game. González had won consecutive batting titles in Major League Baseball and was selected the MVP after recording an average of .333 with seven home runs and 14 RBIs. Other MLB players, including Iván Rodríguez, Sandy Alomar, Jr. and Omar Olivares returned to the league during that season. The Cangrejeros went on to win their fourth Caribbean Series' title. Cordero won the league's batting championship.

The ballparks featured natural grass until 1993 when Ponce that year had artificial turf installed. The Senadores de San Juan defeated the Cuba national baseball team on December 1, 1993, with a walk-off home run by Javier Lopez. The 1993–94 championship was won by San Juan, which was led by Carmelo Martinez's second MVP season. The Criollos rejoined the league for the 1994–95 season and Gonzalez returned to the team. The Cangrejeros won that year's championship, repeating Puerto Rico's title in the Caribbean Series. That year, the Senadores de San Juan managed by Luis "Torito" Meléndez won the title, subsequently assembling one of the strongest teams in the history of the Caribbean Series. The group, which was dubbed "Dream Team", featured Major League Baseball players in most positions, counting with a lineup that included Roberto Alomar, Carlos Baerga, Bernie Williams, Juan González, Edgar Martínez, Carlos Delgado, Rubén Sierra, Rey Sánchez and Carmelo Martínez. Puerto Rico's offensive dominated the tournament, eventually winning the Caribbean Series' championship with an undefeated record of 6–0. The team was responsible for the only two losses of the Dominican Republic, the country that finished second, scoring victories against Pedro Martínez and José Rijo in the third and sixth games respectively. Alomar, who had been traded to the team from Ponce for Javier Lopez during the off-season, was named the series' Most Valuable Player after batting 560 with two home runs.

== Loss of star players to MLB ==
=== Suspension, restructuring and rebranding ===
In August 2007, it was announced that the 2007–2008 season was cancelled due to shrinking attendance and profits over the last 10 years, and the league would instead work on a marketing plan and reorganization. In May 2008, it was announced that the league would come back for the 2008–09 season, and that the Manati Athenians would be moved once again to Santurce, and become the Santurce Crabbers. As part of the restructuring, Major League Baseball offered to work to increase publicity. On July 15, 2008, personnel from the league and Major League Baseball participated in a meeting where details about the league's merchandising were discussed. Ponce was the first team to qualify to the post season, leading the league. Arecibo and Santurce also qualified directly. The last space for the playoffs was decided with a "sudden death" game, with Mayagüez defeating Caguas in with scores of 6–0. On January 8, the players from eliminated teams participated in a special draft, with players including Iván Rodríguez, Saúl Rivera and Luis Matos going to new teams. The Indios and Cangrejeros were eliminated in the semifinals, with Ponce and Arecibo advancing. In the finals, the Leones won the first game, only losing the second before dominating three straight to win the league's championship.

On October 2, 2009, García resigned his position as president of the league, citing "personal reasons". Subsequently, Sadi Antonmattei was elected by the board of directors to serve as president. On October 19, 2009, the league revealed a contract with WIPR-TV to broadcast its games. The 2009–10 season was inaugurated on November 20, 2009, with games between Ponce versus Carolina and Arecibo versus Mayagüez-Aguadilla. This year marked the first time that the league only had five active participants since 1993–94, due to the Cangrejeros' recess. During this season, the inter-league games with the Dominican Winter Baseball League continued being included in the official record books of both organizations. Indios de Mayagüez won the 2009–10 season, their 16th championship (most in the league) when they defeated the Criollos de Caguas 4 games to 1. Three games in this series went to extra innings.

=== Criollos back to back; special tournament (2017–2018) ===
Due to the passing of Hurricane Maria over Puerto Rico in 2017, the league was forced to adopt emergency measures prior to the 2017-18 season, abridging the schedule to one month (being played in January 2018, in order to qualify and being able to defend the Caribbean Series championship), concessions were made to allow Mayagüez and Aguadilla to operate as a single team and changing the rules to play only daytime games due to infrastructure damage and to reschedule games if necessary. Other changes proposed included the creation of a third team in San Juan, which would feature foreign players in order to market to their diaspora in the city. With one week remaining and all teams still in contention, additional rules were implemented to break a tie by using the goal average if necessary for postseason seeding.

By winning the abridged tournament, the Criollos won their 18th title and tied the Indios as the two most successful teams.

== Caribbean Series ==
The Caribbean Confederation was created in 1948, with Puerto Rico joining Panama, Venezuela and Cuba. The following year, the first Caribbean Series was held. Despite being a club competition and not being relevant for WBSC rankings, the Caribbean Professional Baseball Confederation (CBPC) allows the participating teams the option to wear their regular team colors or a variant of the uniform used by the national team of the league's base country. The 1953-55 wins made Puerto Rico the first participant to win three consecutive Caribbean Series.

=== Dream Team (1995) ===
In 1995, the Senadores de San Juan managed by Luis "Torito" Meléndez, assembled one of the strongest teams in the history of the Caribbean Series. The group, which was dubbed "Dream Team", featured Major League Baseball players in most positions, counting with a lineup that included Roberto Alomar, Carlos Baerga, Bernie Williams, Juan González, Edgar Martínez, Carlos Delgado, Rubén Sierra, Rey Sánchez and Carmelo Martínez. Puerto Rico's offensive dominated the tournament, eventually winning the Caribbean Series' championship with an undefeated record of 6–0. The team was responsible for the only two losses of the Dominican Republic, the country that finished second, scoring victories against Pedro Martínez and José Rijo in the third and sixth games respectively.

=== Back to back (2017–2018) ===
After securing the title of the 2016–17 season, the Criollos de Caguas won the Caribbean Series by defeating Águilas de Mexicali (1–0), the first for the league in 17 years and the first for manager Luis Matos in his rookie season.

As the winner of the special abridged tournament of 2018, the Criollos entered the Caribbean Series as the defending champions. The Criollos defeated the Águilas Cibaeñas in the final, 9–4. By winning his second consecutive Caribbean Series in his first two tries, manager Luis Matos tied the record of consecutive titles held solely by Nap Reyes of Tigres de Marianao for six decades.

== Current teams ==
Liga de Béisbol Profesional Roberto Clemente team locations

| Team | City | Stadium | Capacity |
|---|---|---|---|
| Criollos de Caguas | Caguas | Parque Yldefonso Solá Morales | 10,000 |
| Gigantes de Carolina | Carolina | Roberto Clemente Stadium | 12,500 |
| Indios de Mayagüez | Mayagüez | Isidoro García Baseball Stadium | 10,500 |
| Cangrejeros de Santurce | San Juan | Hiram Bithorn Stadium | 19,000 |
| Senadores de San Juan | San Juan | Hiram Bithorn Stadium | 19,000 |
| Leones de Ponce | Ponce | Estadio Francisco Montaner | 16,000 |

== Ballparks ==
| Cangrejeros de Santurce | Senadores de San Juan | Criollos de Caguas | Indios de Mayagüez | Gigantes de Carolina | Leones de Ponce |
|---|---|---|---|---|---|
| Hiram Bithorn Stadium | | Yldefonso Solá Morales Park | Isidoro García Stadium | Roberto Clemente Stadium | Francisco Montaner Stadium |
| Capacity: 18,264 | | Capacity: 10,000 | Capacity: 10,500 | Capacity: 12,500 | Capacity: 16,000 |

== Former teams ==
- Metropolitanos de San Juan (Est.1984)
- Brujos de Guayama (Est. 1938)
- Vaqueros de Bayamón (Est. 1974)
- Grises Orientales de Humacao (Est. 1938)
- Lobos de Arecibo (Est. 1960)
- Tiburones de Aguadilla (Est. 1939)
- Atenienses de Manatí (Est. 2004)
- Piratas Kofresi de Ponce (Est. ???)
- RA12 (Est. 2020)

== Champions ==
Champions
| Season | Team | Manager |
|---|---|---|
| 1938–39 | Guayama | Fernando García |
| 1939–40 | Guayama | Fernando García |
| 1940–41 | Caguas | José Seda |
| 1941–42 | Ponce | George Scales |
| 1942–43 | Ponce | George Scales |
| 1943–44 | Ponce | George Scales |
| 1944–45 | Ponce | George Scales |
| 1945–46 | San Juan | Robert Clarke |
| 1946–47 | Ponce | George Scales |
| 1947–48 | Caguas | Quincy Trouppe |
| 1948–49 | Mayagüez | Artie Wilson |
| 1949–50 | Caguas | Luis Olmo |
| 1950–51 | Santurce (Note: The team also won the Caribbean Series in the same year.) | George Scales |
| 1951–52 | San Juan | Freddie Thon |
| 1952–53 | Santurce | Buster Clarkson |
| 1953–54 | Caguas | Mickey Owen |
| 1954–55 | Santurce | Herman Franks |
| 1955–56 | Caguas | Ben Geraghty |
| 1956–57 | Mayagüez | Mickey Owen |
| 1957–58 | Caguas | Ted Norbert |
| 1958–59 | Santurce | Monchile Concepción |
| 1959–60 | Caguas | Vic Pellot |
| 1960–61 | San Juan | Luman Harris |
| 1961–62 | Santurce | Vernon Benson |
| 1962–63 | Mayagüez | Carl Ermer |
| 1963–64 | San Juan | Les Moss |
| 1964–65 | Santurce | Preston Gómez |
| 1965–66 | Mayagüez | Wayne Blackburn |
| 1966–67 | Santurce | Earl Weaver |
| 1967–68 | Caguas | Nino Escalera |
| 1968–69 | Ponce | Rocky Bridges |
| 1969–70 | Ponce | Jim Fregosi |
| 1970–71 | Santurce | Frank Robinson |
| 1971–72 | Ponce | Frank Verdi |
| 1972–73 | Santurce | Frank Robinson |
| 1973–74 | Caguas | Bobby Wine |
| 1974–75 | Bayamón | José Pagán |
| 1975–76 | Bayamón | José Pagán |
| 1976–77 | Caguas | Doc Edwards |
| 1977–78 | Mayagüez | Rene Lachemann |
| 1978–79 | Caguas | Félix Millán |
| 1979–80 | Bayamón | Art Howe |
| 1980–81 | Caguas | Ray Miller |
| 1981–82 | Ponce | Ed Nottle |
| 1982–83 | Arecibo | Ron Clark |
| 1983–84 | Mayagüez | Frank Verdi |
| 1984–85 | San Juan | Mako Oliveras |
| 1985–86 | Mayagüez | Nick Leyva |
| 1986–87 | Caguas | Tim Foli |
| 1987–88 | Mayagüez | Jim Riggleman |
| 1988–89 | Mayagüez | Tom Gamboa |
| 1989–90 | San Juan | Mako Oliveras |
| 1990–91 | Santurce | Mako Oliveras |
| 1991–92 | Mayagüez | Pat Kelly |
| 1992–93 | Santurce | Mako Oliveras |
| 1993–94 | San Juan | Luis Meléndez |
| 1994–95 | San Juan | Luis Meléndez |
| 1995–96 | Arecibo | Pat Kelly |
| 1996–97 | Mayagüez | Tom Gamboa |
| 1997–98 | Mayagüez | Tom Gamboa |
| 1998–99 | Mayagüez | Al Newman |
| 1999–00 | Santurce | Mako Oliveras |
| 2000–01 | Caguas | Sandy Alomar Sr. |
| 2001–02 | Bayamón | Carmelo Martínez |
| 2002–03 | Mayagüez | Nick Leyva |
| 2003–04 | Ponce | José Cruz Sr. |
| 2004–05 | Mayagüez | Mako Oliveras |
| 2005–06 | Carolina | Lino Rivera |
| 2006–07 | Carolina | Lino Rivera |
| 2007–08 | Season canceled | Season canceled |
| 2008–09 | Ponce | Eduardo Pérez |
| 2009–10 | Mayagüez | Mako Oliveras |
| 2010–11 | Caguas | Lino Rivera |
| 2011–12 | Mayagüez | Dave Miley |
| 2012–13 | Caguas | Pedro López |
| 2013–14 | Mayagüez | Carlos Baerga |
| 2014–15 | Santurce | Eduardo Pérez |
| 2015–16 | Santurce | Ramón Vázquez |
| 2016–17 | Caguas | Luis Matos |
| 2017–18 | Caguas | Luis Matos |
| 2018–19 | Santurce | Ramón Vázquez |
| 2019–20 | Santurce | José Valentín |
| 2020–21 | Caguas | Ramón Vázquez |
| 2021–22 | Caguas | Ramón Vázquez |
| 2022–23 | Mayagüez | Mako Oliveras |
| 2023–24 | Caguas | Yadier Molina |
| 2024–25 | Mayagüez | Wilfredo Cordero |
| 2025–26 | Santurce | Omar López |

== See also ==
- Baseball awards
- Sports in Puerto Rico
