= Ricky Bones =

Puerto Rican baseball player (born 1969)

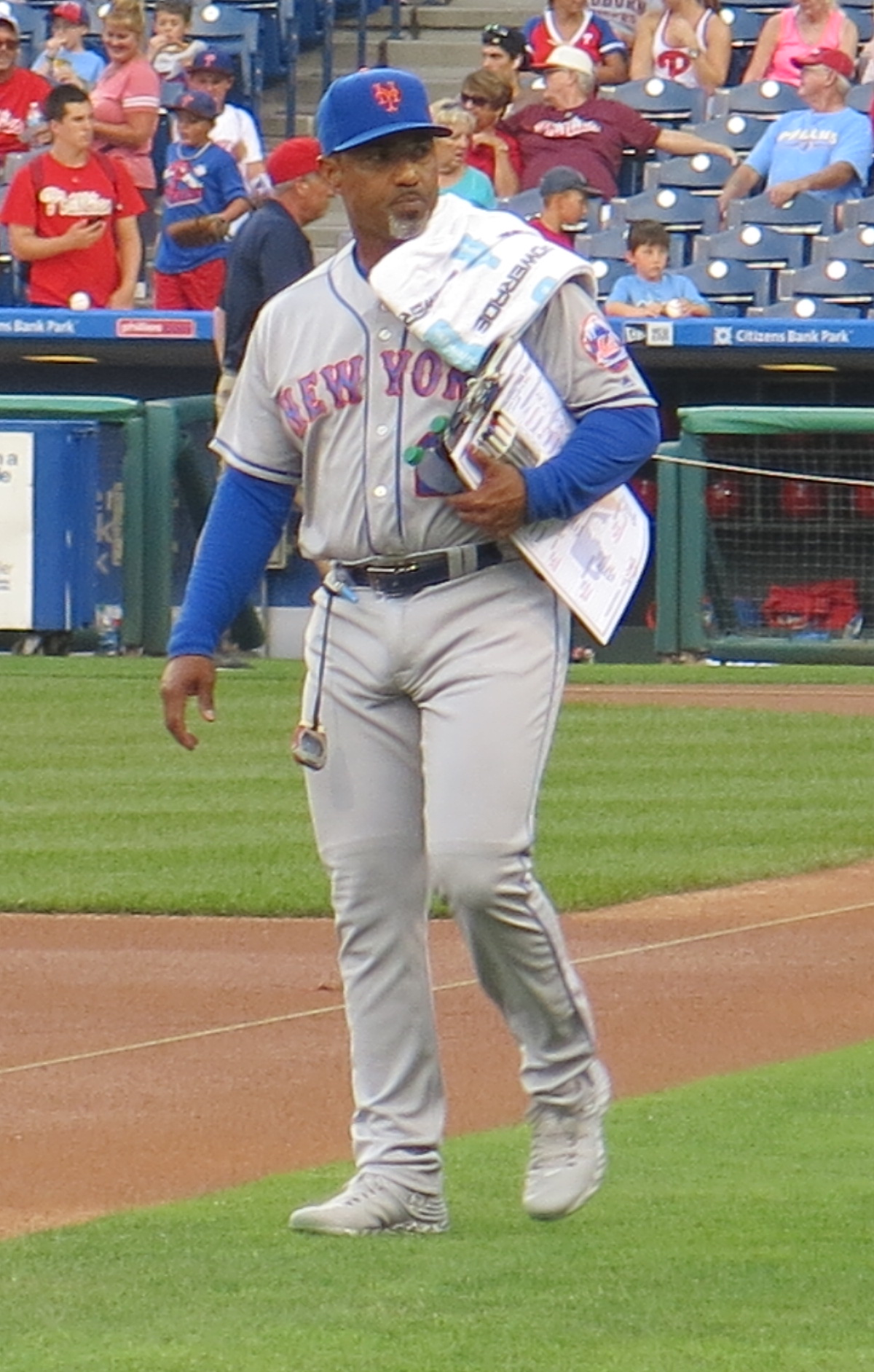
- Bones with the Mets in 2016

Sultanes de Monterrey
- Pitcher / Pitching coach
- Born: April 7, 1969 (age 57); Salinas, Puerto Rico
- Batted: Right Threw: Right

MLB debut
- August 11, 1991, for the San Diego Padres

Last MLB appearance
- October 5, 2001, for the Florida Marlins

MLB statistics
- Win–loss record: 63–82
- Earned run average: 4.85
- Strikeouts: 564
- Stats at Baseball Reference

Teams
- As player: San Diego Padres (1991); Milwaukee Brewers (1992–1996); New York Yankees (1996); Cincinnati Reds (1997); Kansas City Royals (1997–1998); Baltimore Orioles (1999); Florida Marlins (2000–2001); As coach: New York Mets (2012–2021); Washington Nationals (2022–2025)

Career highlights and awards
- All-Star (1994)

Ricardo Bones (/ˈboʊnɪs/; born April 7, 1969) is a Puerto Rican former professional baseball pitcher who currently serves as the pitching coach for the Sultanes de Monterrey of the Mexican League. He played from 1991 to 2001 for three National League teams – the San Diego Padres, Cincinnati Reds, and Florida Marlins – and four American League teams – the Milwaukee Brewers, Kansas City Royals, New York Yankees, and Baltimore Orioles.

== Playing career ==
Bones was signed by the Padres as an amateur free agent on May 13, 1986, making his MLB debut on August 11, 1991, against the Cincinnati Reds. He pitched seven innings, allowed only 2 hits, and received his first professional victory.

On March 26, 1992, Bones was traded with Matt Mieske and José Valentín to the Milwaukee Brewers for Gary Sheffield and minor league player Geoff Kellogg. He stayed with the Brewers for more than 4 seasons. During that time, he was elected to the American League All-Star team in 1994, but did not play in the game. His best season arguably was in 1994 when he won 10 games, losing 9, with a 3.43 ERA in 170 innings.

On August 29, 1996, the Brewers traded Bones, Pat Listach, and Graeme Lloyd to the New York Yankees for Bob Wickman and Gerald Williams. He only played four games with the Yankees before being granted free agency on October 25. After that, he started moving from team to team playing with the Cincinnati Reds, the Brewers again, Kansas City Royals, Minnesota Twins, Baltimore Orioles, and Florida Marlins. On June 19, 1998, Bones picked up the only save of his major league career. He pitched 4 scoreless innings to close out a 8-4 Royals victory over the Tigers. He saved the game for starter Glendon Rusch. On November 5, 2001, he was granted free agency by the Marlins and he chose to retire.

Bones' retirement was precipitated at least in part by a degenerative hip condition which would later require him to undergo a double hip replacement in 2003.

== Coaching career ==
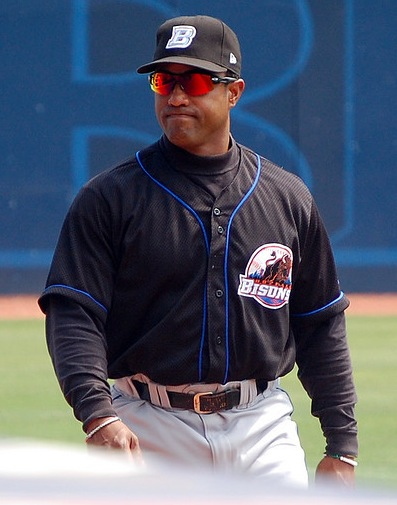
Bones as Buffalo Bisons pitching coach, 2009

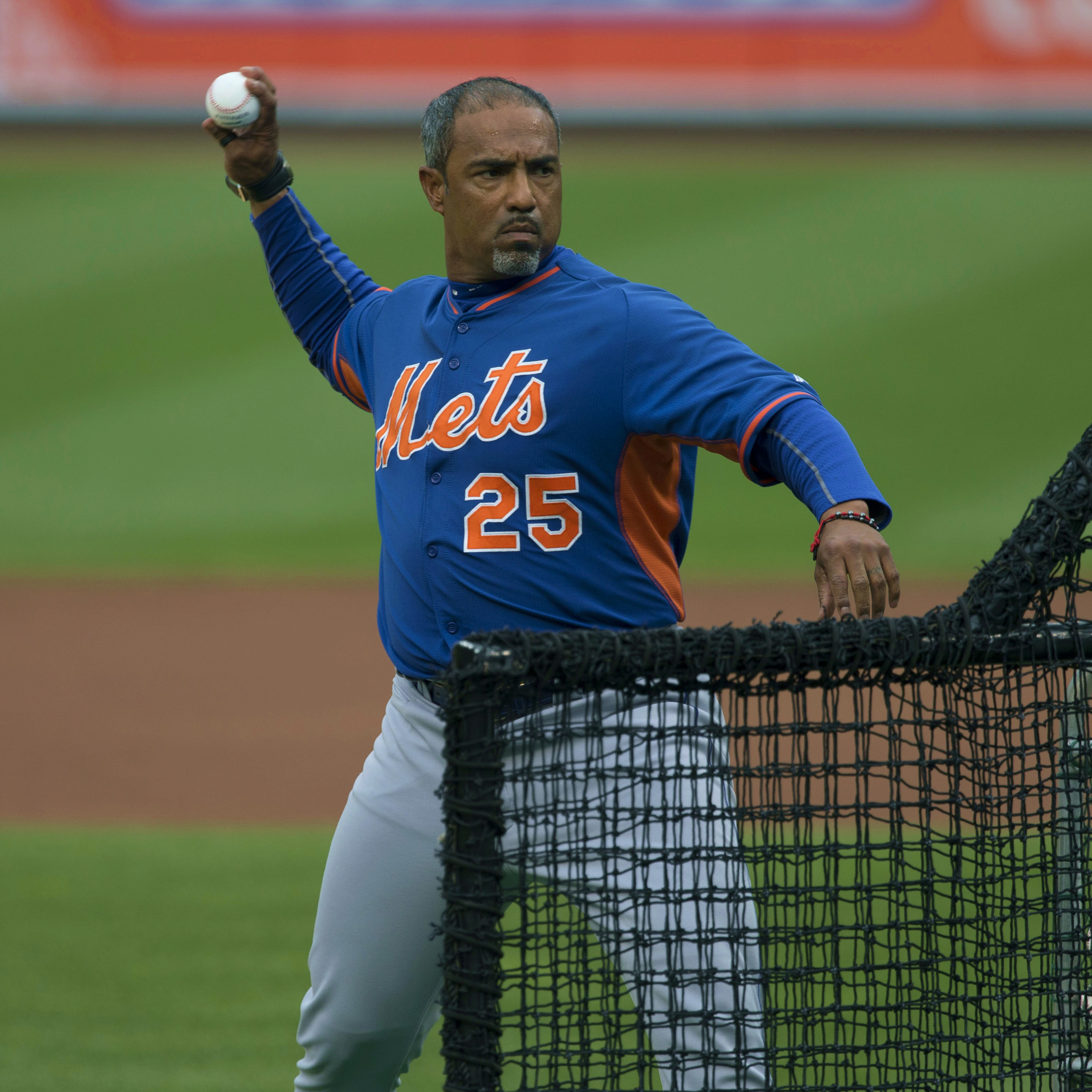
Bones with the Mets in 2015

Bones was the pitching coach for the Binghamton Mets and the Buffalo Bisons.

Bones was the New York Mets bullpen coach from the 2012 to 2018 seasons.

During the 2013 World Baseball Classic, Bones served as pitching coach for the Puerto Rico national baseball team.

On June 20, 2019, Bones once again became the bullpen coach for the New York Mets when Chuck Hernandez was fired. Bones was among several coaches who were granted by the Mets to pursue other coaching opportunities in MLB following the 2021 season.

On November 4, 2021, Bones was hired by the Washington Nationals to serve as the team's bullpen coach for the 2022 season. He was let go following the 2025 season.

On March 10, 2026, Bones was hired to serve as the pitching coach for the Sultanes de Monterrey of the Mexican League.

== PED use ==
In June 2000, a Florida Marlins clubhouse attendant found a paper bag in Bones' locker containing over two dozen syringes and six vials of anabolic steroids. Marlins management reported the find to the league office which subjected Bones to a urine test several months later. Bones later admitted in an interview with Mitchell Report investigators that he was self-administering steroids and painkillers at the time pursuant to a prescription he was given in his hometown in Puerto Rico.

== See also ==
- List of Major League Baseball players from Puerto Rico
- List of Major League Baseball players named in the Mitchell Report

Sporting positions
Preceded by Jon Debus	New York Mets bullpen coach 2012–2018	Succeeded by Chuck Hernandez
Preceded by Chuck Hernandez	New York Mets bullpen coach 2019–2021	Succeeded by Craig Bjornson
Preceded by Henry Blanco	Washington Nationals bullpen coach 2022–present	Succeeded by Incumbent
