= Rey Sánchez =

Puerto Rican baseball player (born 1967)

- Shortstop / Second baseman
- Born: October 5, 1967 (age 59); Río Piedras, Puerto Rico
- Batted: Right Threw: Right

MLB debut
- September 8, 1991, for the Chicago Cubs

Last MLB appearance
- June 8, 2005, for the New York Yankees

MLB statistics
- Batting average: .272
- Home runs: 15
- Runs batted in: 389
- Stats at Baseball Reference

Teams
- Chicago Cubs (1991–1997); New York Yankees (1997); San Francisco Giants (1998); Kansas City Royals (1999–2001); Atlanta Braves (2001); Boston Red Sox (2002); New York Mets (2003); Seattle Mariners (2003); Tampa Bay Devil Rays (2004); New York Yankees (2005)

Rey Francisco Guadalupe Sánchez (born October 5, 1967) is a Puerto Rican former Major League Baseball infielder. He attended high school in California and was drafted in the 13th round of the 1986 amateur baseball draft by the Texas Rangers. He played in their minor league system until 1990, when he was traded to the Chicago Cubs for minor leaguer Bryan House. In 1991, he broke through to the majors, playing 13 games. He continued to play there, often on a regular basis, until August 16, 1997, when he was traded to the New York Yankees for minor leaguer Frisco Parotte. He finished the season there, and then started to become a journeyman. He played (in order) for one season for the San Francisco Giants, two and a half seasons for the Kansas City Royals, 50 games for the Atlanta Braves, and a season for the Boston Red Sox. In 2003, he played 56 and 46 games for the New York Mets and Seattle Mariners, respectively, then moved on to the Tampa Bay Devil Rays for 2004. He became a Yankee for the second time in 2005.

He spent most of his career occasionally starting, replacing injured players, and pinch hitting at shortstop, second base, and third base, although he consistently started at shortstop for the Royals and Braves, and consistently started at second base for the Red Sox. Other than this, he played any infield position off the bench. He had a career .272 batting average and only 15 home runs through 15 years experience. He was often used for his ability to successfully perform the sacrifice bunt.
