= Carlos Baerga =

Puerto Rican baseball player (born 1968)

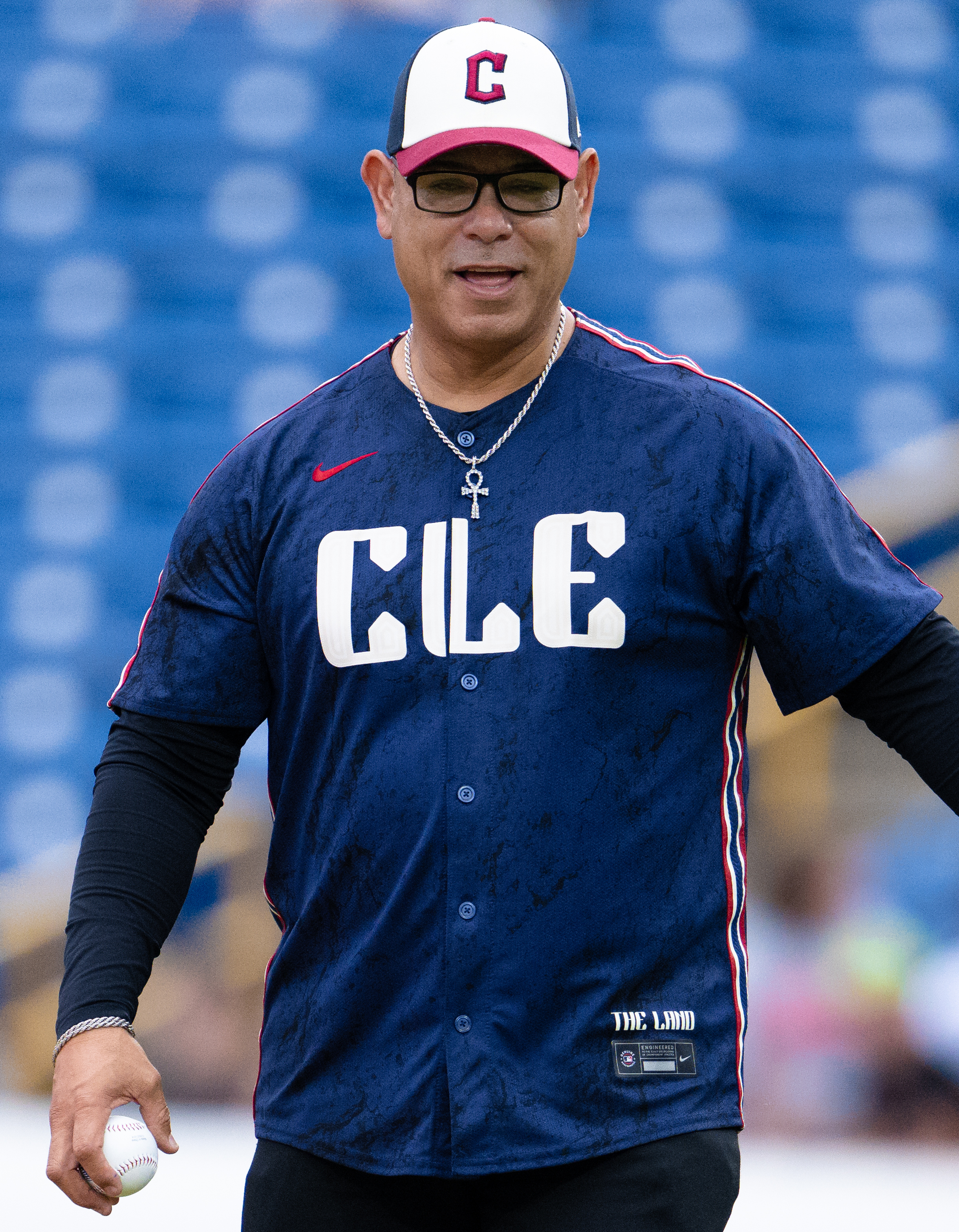
- Baerga in 2024
- Second baseman
- Born: November 4, 1968 (age 57); Santurce, Puerto Rico
- Batted: Switch Threw: Right

Professional debut
- MLB: April 14, 1990, for the Cleveland Indians
- KBO: July 28, 2001, for the Samsung Lions

Last appearance
- MLB: September 30, 2005, for the Washington Nationals
- KBO: October 28, 2001, for the Samsung Lions

MLB statistics
- Batting average: .291
- Home runs: 134
- Runs batted in: 774

KBO statistics
- Batting average: .275
- Home runs: 4
- Runs batted in: 17
- Stats at Baseball Reference

Teams
- Cleveland Indians (1990–1996); New York Mets (1996–1998); San Diego Padres (1999); Cleveland Indians (1999); Samsung Lions (2001); Boston Red Sox (2002); Arizona Diamondbacks (2003–2004); Washington Nationals (2005)

Career highlights and awards
- 3× All-Star (1992, 1993, 1995); 2× Silver Slugger Award (1993, 1994); Cleveland Guardians Hall of Fame
Medals
Men's baseball
Representing Puerto Rico
World Baseball Classic
Silver medal – second place	2013 San Francisco	Team
Silver medal – second place	2017 Los Angeles	Team

Carlos Obed Ortiz Baerga (/baɪˈɛərɡə/; Spanish: [baˈeɾɣa]; born November 4, 1968) is a Puerto Rican former Major League Baseball player. Baerga was known for his superb hitting abilities during his first stint with the Cleveland Indians in the early-to-mid-1990s, accumulating impressive batting statistics, earning three All-Star appearances (1992, 1993, 1995), two Silver Slugger Awards (1993, 1994), and making key contributions to the Indians' 1995 postseason run. He was considered one of Major League Baseball's hardest-hitting middle infielders by 1995 with his superb bat speed and switch-hitting power. After spending most of his career as a second baseman, he was used at various positions late in his career. Baerga was elected into the Indians Hall of Fame in 2013.

== Playing career ==
=== Cleveland Indians ===
On November 4, 1985, at the age of sixteen, Baerga was signed by the San Diego Padres. As a 17-year-old he debuted for their Class A affiliate Charleston Rainbows. He played with the team for two seasons. On December 6, 1989, San Diego traded him to the Cleveland Indians along with Sandy Alomar Jr. and Chris James in exchange for established power-hitter Joe Carter. Baerga debuted as a major league baseball player with the Indians, on April 14, 1990. That year, he played mostly as a third baseman and shortstop and would hit 17 doubles and seven home runs, while averaging .260 at the plate.

Over the next four years, his home run and batting averages numbers rose steadily, hitting 11 home runs, and batting .288 in 1991 while playing mostly as a third baseman and second baseman, hitting 20 home runs and averaging .312 in 1992 while becoming a full-time second baseman, and with 21 home runs and an average of .321 in 1993. In 1992, he reached 200 hits in one season for the first time, getting 205 hits that year. In 1993, he duplicated the mark of 200 hits, with exactly 200.

Baerga became the first second baseman since Rogers Hornsby in 1922 to have back-to-back 200+ hit, 20+ home run, 100+ RBI, and .300+ average seasons when he accomplished the feat in 1992–93. He was a 3-time All Star in the 1992, 1993, and 1994 seasons.

The switch-hitting Baerga was the first of three players to have ever hit one home run from both sides of the plate in the same inning. He did so on April 8, 1993, at Cleveland Municipal Stadium against New York Yankees pitchers Steve Howe and Steve Farr in the game's 7th inning. On August 29, 2002, he was joined by Chicago Cubs utility player Mark Bellhorn, who completed the feat against the Milwaukee Brewers, and on July 30, 2012, Kendrys Morales became the third player to accomplish this rare feat against the Texas Rangers.

During the strike-shortened 1994 season, Baerga hit 19 home runs and maintained an average of .314 at the plate. In the 144-game 1995 season, Baerga had 175 hits and 15 home runs in 139 games, with a .314 average. The Indians made it to the World Series, where they fell to the Atlanta Braves in six games (Baerga flew out to Marquis Grissom for the final out).

Baerga played 100 games with the Indians in 1996, before being traded to the New York Mets on July 29, 1996, with Álvaro Espinoza, for Jeff Kent and José Vizcaíno. He collected 129 hits with twelve home runs that year, hitting only .193 after being traded to the Mets. He ended that year with an average of .254. Over the next two seasons with the Mets, Baerga had below average seasons, hitting nine home runs and batting .281 in 1997, and seven home runs and .266 in 1998. He was granted free agency on October 26, 1998.

=== Decline and retirement ===
Baerga began to develop problems with his knees. On January 27, 1999, Baerga was signed by the St. Louis Cardinals and released before the season began. The Cincinnati Reds signed him, but after he hit .290 in the minors, released him midseason. The San Diego Padres put him in the minors for 21 games where he hit .286, and brought him up for 33 games where he hit .250. Bought by Cleveland in August, he hit .228 in 31 games with them.

Signed briefly by the Tampa Bay Devil Rays in 2000, Baerga did not appear in the majors that year. He felt that he could no longer perform as a major leaguer. In 2001, he signed with the Seattle Mariners but was released during spring training. In 2001, he played for the Long Island Ducks and in the Korea Baseball Organization, Samsung Lions(삼성 라이온즈 야구단)). Then he retired, and bought the Santurce Crabbers, becoming player-manager and realizing his childhood dream.

=== Return to major leagues ===
In 2002, Baerga returned to the majors. That year, he got 52 hits with the Boston Red Sox, primarily serving as a pinch-hitter and designated hitter. In 2003, he was traded to the Arizona Diamondbacks, where he collected 71 hits for the team. The Diamondbacks re-signed him for 2004, but the aging Baerga, now prone to injury, was hurt again and was only able to play in 20 games that season. He was signed by the Washington Nationals to a minor league contract before the 2005 season and played 93 games for them. He also played for Puerto Rico in the 2006 World Baseball Classic.

Baerga collected 1,543 hits in his MLB career, with 134 home runs, 774 RBI and a .291 batting average.

As a broadcaster, Baerga has enjoyed prominence as a color commentator for Monday Night Baseball retransmissions in Spanish on ESPN Dos for the Mexico-Caribbean-Venezuela region. He is an analyst on Beisbol Esta Noche (the Spanish version of Baseball Tonight) on ESPN Deportes and ESPN Latin America. He is recognized by fans and co-workers as "Carlos Obed".

== Post-playing career ==
During the 2013 World Baseball Classic, Baerga served as one of the assistant coaches under Edwin Rodríguez.

In 2013, Baerga became the manager of the Indios de Mayagüez in Puerto Rico's Roberto Clemente Professional Baseball League.

In 2013, Baerga was elected into the Indians Hall of Fame.

In 2020, he was named the bench coach of RA12.

In 2024, Baerga became the analyst for the Cleveland Guardians Spanish-language radio broadcasts on WARF 1350 AM in Cleveland.

== Personal life ==
Baerga's son, Carlos Jr., was also a professional baseball player.

== See also ==
- List of Major League Baseball players from Puerto Rico
- List of Major League Baseball single-game hits leaders
- List of Puerto Ricans
