= Rubén Sierra =

Puerto Rican baseball player (born 1965)

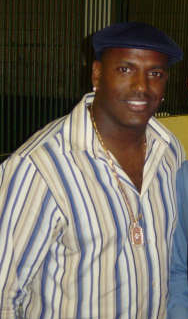
- Right fielder / Designated hitter
- Born: October 6, 1965 (age 60); Río Piedras, Puerto Rico
- Batted: Switch Threw: Right

MLB debut
- June 1, 1986, for the Texas Rangers

Last MLB appearance
- July 9, 2006, for the Minnesota Twins

MLB statistics
- Batting average: .268
- Hits: 2,152
- Home runs: 306
- Runs batted in: 1,322
- Stats at Baseball Reference

Teams
- Texas Rangers (1986–1992); Oakland Athletics (1992–1995); New York Yankees (1995–1996); Detroit Tigers (1996); Cincinnati Reds (1997); Toronto Blue Jays (1997); Chicago White Sox (1998); Texas Rangers (2000–2001); Seattle Mariners (2002); Texas Rangers (2003); New York Yankees (2003–2005); Minnesota Twins (2006)

Career highlights and awards
- 4× All-Star (1989, 1991, 1992, 1994); Silver Slugger Award (1989); AL RBI leader (1989); Texas Rangers Hall of Fame

Rubén Angel Sierra García (born October 6, 1965) is a Puerto Rican former Major League Baseball (MLB) outfielder. Over 20 seasons, Sierra played for the Texas Rangers (1986–92, 2000–01, 2003), Oakland Athletics (1992–95), New York Yankees (1995–96, 2003–05), Detroit Tigers (1996), Cincinnati Reds (1997), Toronto Blue Jays (1997), Chicago White Sox (1998), Seattle Mariners (2002) and Minnesota Twins (2006).

Sierra also was under contract and appeared in spring training for both the Cleveland Indians and New York Mets, but never played in a non-exhibition game with either team. During his playing career, Sierra was known as 'El Indio' or 'El Caballo' (The Horse).

== Early life ==
Sierra graduated from Liceo Interamericano Castro High School in Puerto Rico in 1983, where he played baseball, basketball and volleyball.

== MLB career ==
In November 1982, the Texas Rangers of Major League Baseball (MLB) signed 17-year-old Sierra as a free agent. Sierra made his major league debut on June 1, 1986, as an outfielder and hit a home run in his second MLB at bat. Sierra hit .264 with 16 home runs and 55 runs batted in (RBIs) in his rookie year.

In 1989, Sierra hit 29 home runs and led the league in RBIs (119), triples (14), slugging percentage (.543), total bases (344) and extra base hits (78), and finished second in MVP voting to Robin Yount. He had three seasons with over 100 RBIs with the Rangers. In August 1992, the Rangers traded Sierra, Jeff Russell, and Bobby Witt to the Oakland Athletics for José Canseco.

In 1995, the Athletics traded Sierra and Jason Beverlin to the New York Yankees for Danny Tartabull. After helping the Yankees reach the playoffs for the first time in 14 years in 1995, Sierra was traded to the Detroit Tigers with Matt Drews for Cecil Fielder. After the 1997 season, the Tigers traded Sierra to the Cincinnati Reds for minor leaguers Decomba Conner and Ben Bailey.

Sierra won the AL Comeback Player of the Year Award with the Rangers in 2001. He played for the Mariners in 2002 and began the 2003 season with the Rangers. On June 6, 2003, the Rangers traded Sierra to the Yankees for Marcus Thames. Sierra was an important part of the 2004 Yankees, a team that hit over 240 home runs, hitting 17 of them as the usual designated hitter, playing in 56 games at the position.

In Game 4 of the 2004 American League Division Series, with the Yankees down to the Minnesota Twins 5–2, Sierra hit a three-run home run to tie the game at 5–5 off of reliever Juan Rincón. His clutch home run helped the Yankees rally to win the game and the series. However, he was the final out of Game 7 of the 2004 American League Championship Series, hitting a ground ball to Pokey Reese, which secured the dramatic comeback victory of the Boston Red Sox. Sierra had an injury-plagued 2005 season and was let go by the Yankees after hitting just 4 home runs in 61 games. In 2006, Sierra signed a minor league contract with the Minnesota Twins, but was released on July 10. In August, Sierra was offered a chance to sign on with the New York Mets for the September run and playoffs. However, due to an illness to his mother, he opted not to play again in 2006.

In January 2007, Sierra signed a minor league contract with the Mets, who invited him to spring training. However, on March 20, he requested and was granted his release by the team after being reassigned the previous Thursday.

== See also ==
- List of Major League Baseball career home run leaders
- List of Major League Baseball career hits leaders
- List of Silver Slugger Award winners at outfield
- List of Major League Baseball career doubles leaders
- List of Major League Baseball career runs scored leaders
- List of Major League Baseball career runs batted in leaders
- List of Major League Baseball annual runs batted in leaders
- List of Major League Baseball annual triples leaders

Awards and achievements
Preceded by Ron Kittle; Dave Henderson	American League Player of the Month; June 1989; May 1991	Succeeded by Robin Yount; Joe Carter
