= 1958 Caribbean Series =

1958 baseball tournament

Tournament details
- Country: Puerto Rico
- City: San Juan
- Venue(s): 1 (in 1 host city)
- Dates: 8–13 February
- Teams: 4

Final positions
- Champions: (Cuba) Tigres de Marianao (2nd title)
- Runners-up: (Puerto Rico) Criollos de Caguas

Awards
- MVP: (United States) Earl Battey

The tenth edition of the Caribbean Series (Serie del Caribe) was played in 1958. It was held from February 8 through February 13 with the champions teams from Cuba, Tigres de Marianao; Panama, Carta Vieja Yankees; Puerto Rico, Criollos de Caguas and Venezuela, Industriales de Valencia. The format consisted of 12 games, each team facing the other teams twice. The games were played at Estadio Sixto Escobar in San Juan, Puerto Rico.

== Summary ==
Cuba won the Series with a 4-2 record en route for a third straight championship (fifth overall). Managed by Napoleón Reyes, the team received offensive support from 2B Casey Wise (.407 BA), CF Solly Drake (.333) and LF Minnie Miñoso (.318). The pitching staff was led by Pedro Ramos (2-1, 18 strikeouts) and Bob Shaw (1-0, 1.69 ERA and no walks in 16 innings). The Cubans, who failed to hit a home run in the Series, also had 1B Julio Bécquer and C Ray Noble in addition to pitchers Mike Fornieles and Bill Werle. The Marianao club became the first repeat champions in the Series history.

Panama, led by catcher/manager Wilmer Shantz, posted a 3-3 record to tie the second place with Puerto Rico. The Panamanian squad got fine work of pitchers Humberto Robinson (2-0, 1.00 ERA, including a four-hit shutout) and Carl Duser (1-0, 3.00), while 3B Héctor López hit .474 with a .609 SLG.

Puerto Rico was guided by Ted Norbert and received a strong pitching performance from Juan Pizarro (1-0, 2.76 16 1/3 innings), who set two strikeout records with 17 in a game (#2) and 29 overall (12 in game 10). The Caguas attack was guided by 1B Víctor Pellot Power (.458 BA, eight RBI, .583 SLG) and CF Roberto Clemente (.391, six runs, .609 SLG), while P Jerry Nelson (1-1, 0.00 ERA) allowed three unearned runs over 18 innings. Other roster members included Mike Goliat (2B), Luis [Canena] Márquez (OF), Félix Mantilla (SS), José [Pantalones] Santiago (P) and Valmy Thomas (C).

Venezuela, piloted by Regino Otero, finished in last place with a 2-4 record. The offensive was anchored by catcher and Series MVP Earl Battey (.435 BA, four RBI, .739 SLG), 1B Lou Limmer (.381, two HR, five RBI, .762 SLG) and RF Bob Wilson, who won the batting title with a .500 BA (12-for-24) while collecting one home run, five runs, four RBI and a .708 SLG. For the second time, Limmer led the tournament in home runs. Pitchers Ramón Monzant (1-1, 3.95) and José Bracho (1-2, 4.37) got the victories for Valencia. OF Elio Chacón (.217, four runs, 3B, one RBI) and SS Chico Carrasquel (.240, four runs, two RBI) also homered in the Series. Besides, Julián Ladera made two relief appearances and struck out 10 batters in 10 2/3 innings of work.

== Participating teams ==
Team	Manager
(Panama) Carta Vieja Yankees	(United States) Billy Shantz
(Puerto Rico) Criollos de Caguas	(United States) Ted Norbert
(Venezuela) Industriales de Valencia	(Cuba) Regino Otero
(Cuba) Tigres de Marianao	(Cuba) Napoleón Reyes

== Final standings ==
Pos	Team	Pld	W	L	RF	RA	RD	PCT	GB
1	(Cuba) Tigres de Marianao	6	4	2	33	20	+13	.667	—
2	(Puerto Rico) Criollos de Caguas (H)	6	3	3	28	25	+3	.500	1
3	(Panama) Carta Vieja Yankees	6	3	3	23	33	−10	.500	1
4	(Venezuela) Industriales de Valencia	6	2	4	24	30	−6	.333	2

Source: CBPC
(H) Hosts

== Scoreboards ==
=== Game 1, February 8 ===
Team	1	2	3	4	5	6	7	8	9	R	H	E
Cuba	0	2	0	0	0	3	5	0	0	10	13	0
Venezuela	0	0	0	0	0	1	0	1	0	2	7	5
WP: Mike Fornieles (1-0) LP: Emilio Cueche (0-1); Home runs: CUB: None; VEN: Elio Chacón (1)

=== Game 2, February 8 ===
Team	1	2	3	4	5	6	7	8	9	R	H	E
Panama	0	0	0	0	0	0	0	0	0	0	2	2
Puerto Rico	2	0	3	0	0	3	0	0	X	8	16	0
WP: Juan Pizarro (1-0) LP: Jerry Davie (0-1)

=== Game 3, February 9 ===
Team	1	2	3	4	5	6	7	8	9	R	H	E
Cuba	0	0	0	0	0	0	0	0	0	0	4	0
Panama	0	0	0	0	5	0	0	0	X	5	9	0
WP: Humberto Robinson (1-0) LP: Pedro Ramos (0-1)

=== Game 4, February 9 ===
Team	1	2	3	4	5	6	7	8	9	R	H	E
Puerto Rico	4	1	0	0	1	0	0	0	0	6	9	1
Venezuela	0	0	0	0	0	0	1	0	0	1	8	0
WP: Jerry Nelson (1-0) LP: Ramón Monzant (0-1)

=== Game 5, February 10 ===
Team	1	2	3	4	5	6	7	8	9	R	H	E
Panama	0	1	0	0	0	0	0	0	0	1	5	1
Venezuela	0	1	0	2	2	0	0	0	X	5	10	0
WP: José Bracho (1-0) LP: Dave Benedict (0-1); Home runs: PAN: None; VEN: Bob Wilson (1), Earl Battey (1), Chico Carrasquel (1); Notes: Bracho pitched a complete game and set an all-time Series record with his sixth win in the tournament.

=== Game 6, February 10 ===
Team	1	2	3	4	5	6	7	8	9	R	H	E
Puerto Rico	2	0	0	0	0	0	2	0	0	4	6	0
Cuba	1	0	0	2	0	0	0	0	2	5	10	1
WP: Pedro Ramos (1-0) LP: Marion Fricano (0-1); Home runs: PRI: Roberto Clemente (1); CUB: * The game was suspended after a brawl occurred in the bottom of the ninth inning with no outs, one run scored and bases loaded. The game would be completed the next day.

=== Game 7, February 11 ===
Team	1	2	3	4	5	6	7	8	9	R	H	E
Venezuela	4	4	0	0	0	0	0	0		8	13	0
Cuba	0	0	0	0	0	1	0	0	0	1	8	1
WP: Ramón Monzant (1-1) LP: Mike Fornieles (1-1)

=== Game 8, February 11 ===
Team	1	2	3	4	5	6	7	8	9	R	H	E
Puerto Rico	0	0	0	0	0	2	0	0	0	3	9	4
Panama	0	1	0	0	3	3	1	3	X	11	11	1
WP: Carl Duser (1-0) LP: Marion Fricano (0-2); Home runs: PRI: None; PAN: Ray Dabek (1) * After completion of Game 6, Fricano became the first and only pitcher in Series history to collect two losses in the same day.

=== Game 9, February 12 ===
Team	1	2	3	4	5	6	7	8	9	R	H	E
Panama	0	0	0	0	0	0	0	0	1	1	8	4
Cuba	5	3	3	0	1	1	2	0	X	15	17	0
WP: Pedro Ramos (2-1) LP: Jim Umbricht (0-1)

=== Game 10, February 12 ===
Team	1	2	3	4	5	6	7	8	9	R	H	E
Venezuela	0	1	0	0	2	0	0	3	0	6	7	1
Puerto Rico	0	0	3	0	3	0	0	0	1	7	13	1
WP: José Santiago (1-0) LP: José Bracho (1-1); Home runs: : Lou Limmer (1); PRI: None

=== Game 11, February 13 ===
Team	1	2	3	4	5	6	7	8	9	R	H	E
Venezuela	0	0	0	0	2	0	0	0	0	2	10	0
Panama	1	0	3	0	1	0	0	0	X	5	11	0
WP: Humberto Robinson (2-0) LP: José Bracho (1-2); Home runs: : Lou Limmer (2); PAN: None

=== Game 12, February 13 ===
Team	1	2	3	4	5	6	7	8	9	R	H	E
Cuba	0	0	0	0	0	0	0	0	2	2	6	1
Puerto Rico	0	0	0	0	0	0	0	0	0	0	3	1
WP: Bob Shaw (1-0) LP: Jerry Nelson (1-1)

== Statistics leaders ==
Statistic	Player	Team	Total
Batting average	(United States) Bob Wilson	(Venezuela) Industriales de Valencia	.500
Home runs	(United States) Lou Limmer	(Venezuela) Industriales de Valencia	2
Runs batted in	(Puerto Rico) Vic Power	(Puerto Rico) Criollos de Caguas	8
Runs	(United States) Earl Battey	(Venezuela) Industriales de Valencia	6
Runs	(Puerto Rico) Roberto Clemente	(Puerto Rico) Criollos de Caguas	6
Hits	(United States) Bob Wilson	(Venezuela) Industriales de Valencia	12
Doubles	(United States) Earl Battey	(Venezuela) Industriales de Valencia	4
Doubles	(Puerto Rico) Vic Power	(Puerto Rico) Criollos de Caguas	4
Doubles	(Puerto Rico) Valmy Thomas	(Puerto Rico) Criollos de Caguas	4
Triples	Nine tied		1
Stolen bases	Six tied		1
Wins	(Cuba) Pedro Ramos	(Cuba) Tigres de Marianao	2
Wins	(Panama) Humberto Robinson	(Panama) Carta Vieja Yankees	2
Earned run average	(United States) Jerry Nelson	(Puerto Rico) Criollos de Caguas	0.00
Strikeouts	(Puerto Rico) Juan Pizarro	(Puerto Rico) Criollos de Caguas	29
Innings pitched	(United States) Jerry Nelson	(Puerto Rico) Criollos de Caguas	18.0
Innings pitched	(Panama) Humberto Robinson	(Panama) Carta Vieja Yankees	18.0

== Awards ==
Tournament Awards
Award	Player	Team
MVP	(United States) Earl Battey	(Venezuela) Industriales de Valencia
Best manager	(Cuba) Napoléon Reyes	(Cuba) Tigres de Marianao

All Star Team
Position	Player	Team
First base	(Puerto Rico) Vic Power	(Puerto Rico) Criollos de Caguas
Second base	(United States) Casey Wise	(Cuba) Tigres de Marianao
Third base	(Panama) Héctor López	(Panama) Carta Vieja Yankees
Shortstop	(Venezuela) Chico Carrasquel	(Venezuela) Industriales de Valencia
Left field	(Cuba) Minnie Miñoso	(Cuba) Tigres de Marianao
Center field	(Puerto Rico) Roberto Clemente	(Puerto Rico) Criollos de Caguas
Right field	(United States) Bob Wilson	(Venezuela) Industriales de Valencia
Catcher	(United States) Earl Battey	(Venezuela) Industriales de Valencia
Pitcher	(Panama) Humberto Robinson	(Panama) Carta Vieja Yankees

== Sources ==
- Antero Núñez, José. Series del Caribe. Jefferson, Caracas, Venezuela: Impresos Urbina, C.A., 1987.
- Gutiérrez, Daniel. Enciclopedia del Béisbol en Venezuela – 1895-2006 . Caracas, Venezuela: Impresión Arte, C.A., 2007.
