= 1957 Caribbean Series =

1957 baseball tournament

Tournament details
- Country: Cuba
- City: Havana
- Venue(s): 1 (in 1 host city)
- Dates: 9–14 February
- Teams: 4

Final positions
- Champions: (Cuba) Tigres de Marianao (1st title)
- Runners-up: (Panama) Cerveza Balboa

Awards
- MVP: (United States) Solly Drake

The ninth edition of the Caribbean Series (Serie del Caribe) was played in 1957. It was held from February 9 through February 14, featuring the champion baseball teams of Cuba, Tigres de Marianao; Panama, Cerveza Balboa; Puerto Rico, Indios de Mayagüez, and Venezuela, Leones del Caracas. The format consisted of 12 games, each team facing the other teams twice. The games were played at Estadio del Cerro in Havana, the Cuban capital. The first pitch was thrown by Ford Frick, by then the Commissioner of Major League Baseball.

== Summary ==
The Cuban team was managed by Napoleón Reyes and finished with a 5–1 mark, with their only loss coming to Puerto Rico. Marianao offensive was clearly guided by Series MVP outfielder Solly Drake, who won the batting title with a .500 batting average and also led in runs (9), hits (11) and stolen bases (4). Supporting him were fellow OF Minnie Miñoso (.391, seven RBI, five runs) and catcher Hal Smith (.273, seven RBI). Pitcher Jim Bunning got two wins with a 0.61 ERA, including a seven-hit, one-run game and 5 2/3 scoreless innings of relief. Behind him were Mike Fornieles (1–0, 3.00), Bill Werle (1–1, 3.94) and Conrado Marrero (0–0, 2.70). Also in the roster were reliever Enrique Maroto and infielders Julio Bécquer, Harold Bevan and José Valdivielso.

Panama, managed by catcher León Kellman, posted a 3–3 record for a surprising second-place finish. Balboa most prominent player was Winston Brown, who pitched a six-hit, one run complete game and a four-hit shutout, in both cases against Venezuela. Another gem game from George Brunet (1–1, 17 SO, 1.76 ERA), who pitched the first shutout for a Panamanian team in Series history, and also hit one of the club's two homers. 1B Harold Gordon led the attack with a .412 BA. Other roster members included 2B Héctor López and P Dutch Romberger.

Puerto Rico tied with Venezuela for third place with a 2–4 mark. The Mayagüez team was piloted by Mickey Owen, while RF Canena Márquez provided the support attack (375, three HR, five runs, .792 SLG). The other major contributors were 1B Bob Speake (.391, one HR, five RBI, .652 SLG) and P José Santiago, who handed Marianao their only lost, throwing a three-hit shutout. Puerto Rico also featured 2B Bob Aspromonte, OF Bob Smith, and pitchers Herb Plews and Pete Wojey, among others.

Venezuela, guided by Clay Bryant, included C John Roseboro (.376 BA, .556 SLG); IFs Rudy Regalado (.292 BA), Pompeyo Davalillo (.381, three SB, four runs), Chico Carrasquel (.292, HR, .458 SLG) and Luis García (2-for-13, 2B, RBI), as well as OFs Tom Burgess (4-for-24) and Bob Wilson (4-for-22). Caracas pitchers Babe Birrer (1–1, 2.60) and Julián Ladera (1–0, 2.25) collected the only wins for the team in complete-game efforts. Emilio Cueche took a complete-game loss after giving up two unearned runs in Game 5, and later hurled two scoreless innings of relief for a perfect 0.00 ERA, the best for the Series.

== Participating teams ==
Team	Manager
(Panama) Cerveza Balboa	(Panama) León Kellman
(Puerto Rico) Indios de Mayagüez	(United States) Mickey Owen
(Venezuela) Leones del Caracas	(United States) Clay Bryant
(Cuba) Tigres de Marianao	(Cuba) Napoleón Reyes

== Final standings ==
Pos	Team	Pld	W	L	RF	RA	RD	PCT	GB
1	(Cuba) Tigres de Marianao (H)	6	5	1	27	16	+11	.833	—
2	(Panama) Cerveza Balboa	6	3	3	14	15	−1	.500	2
3	(Puerto Rico) Indios de Mayagüez	6	2	4	22	31	−9	.333	3
4	(Venezuela) Leones del Caracas	6	2	4	23	24	−1	.333	3

Source: CBPC
(H) Hosts

=== Scoreboards ===
==== Game 1, February 9 ====
Team	1	2	3	4	5	6	7	8	9	R	H	E
Puerto Rico	0	2		0	0	0	0	0	1	3	7	2
Venezuela	2	3	1	1	0	0	0	3	X	10	14	3
WP: Babe Birrer (1-0) LP: Bob Smith (0-1); Home runs: PRI: Luis Márquez (1); VEN: John Roseboro (1)

==== Game 2, February 9 ====
Team	1	2	3	4	5	6	7	8	9	R	H	E
Panama	0	0	0	0	0	1	0	0	0	1	7	1
Cuba	0	0	0	3	0	0	0	1	X	4	6	0
WP: Jim Bunning (1-0) LP: Ronald Scheetz (0-1); Home runs: PAN: John Gleen (1); CUB: None

==== Game 3, February 10 ====
Team	1	2	3	4	5	6	7	8	9	R	H	E
Puerto Rico	0	0	1	0	0	0	4	2	0	7	11	1
Panama	0	0	0	0	0	0	0	1	0	1	2	6
WP: Pete Wojey (1-0) LP: George Brunet (0-1); Home runs: PRI: Pete Wojey (1); PAN: None

==== Game 4, February 10 ====
Team	1	2	3	4	5	6	7	8	9	R	H	E
Cuba	2	0	2	0	0	0	3	0	0	7	12	0
Venezuela	1	0	0	0	0	0	0	0	0	1	3	1
WP: Mike Fornieles (1-0) LP: Bob Blaylock (0-1); Home runs: CUB: None; VEN: Chico Carrasquel (1)

==== Game 5, February 11 ====
Team	1	2	3	4	5	6	7	8	9	R	H	E
Venezuela	0	0	0	0	0	0	1	0	0	1	6	3
Panama	1	0	0	1	0	0	0	0	X	2	4	0
WP: Winston Brown (1-0) LP: Emilio Cueche (0-1)

==== Game 6, February 11 ====
Team	1	2	3	4	5	6	7	8	9	R	H	E
Puerto Rico	0	2	0	0	0	1	0	2	1	6	16	1
Cuba	0	0	0	0	0	0	0	0	0	0	3	2
WP: José Santiago (1-0) LP: Bill Werle (0-1); Home runs: PRI: Luis Márquez (2); CUB: None

==== Game 7, February 12 ====
Team	1	2	3	4	5	6	7	8	9	R	H	E
Venezuela	0	2	0	1	3	0	0	1	0	7	9	1
Puerto Rico	0	0	0	1	0	0	0	0	2	3	6	2
WP: Julián Ladera (1-0) LP: Duke Maas (0-1); Home runs: VEN: None; PRI: Bob Speake (1)

==== Game 8, February 12 ====
Team	1	2	3	4	5	6	7	8	9	R	H	E
Cuba	2	0	0	0	0	0	0	1	0	3	3	0
Panama	0	0	0	1	0	0	0	0	0	1	6	1
WP: Jim Bunning (2-0) LP: Ronald Scheetz (0-2)

==== Game 9, February 13 ====
Team	1	2	3	4	5	6	7	8	9	R	H	E
Panama	0	0	0	0	0	1	1	3	0	5	10	1
Puerto Rico	0	0	0	0	0	0	0	0	0	0	4	2
WP: George Brunet (1-1) LP: Bob Smith (0-2)

==== Game 10, February 13 ====
Team	1	2	3	4	5	6	7	8	9	R	H	E
Venezuela	0	1	1	0	0	0	2	0	0	4	10	4
Cuba	0	0	2	0	0	0	0	0	3	5	10	0
WP: Vicente López (1-0) LP: Babe Birrer (1-1); Home runs: VEN: Bob Wilson (1); CUB: None

==== Game 11, February 14 ====
Team	1	2	3	4	5	6	7	8	9	R	H	E
Panama	1	0	2	0	0	0	0	0	0	4	12	1
Venezuela	0	0	0	0	0	0	0	0	0	0	3	3
WP: Winston Brown (2-0) LP: John Jancse (0-1)

==== Game 12, February 14 ====
Team	1	2	3	4	5	6	7	8	9	R	H	E
Cuba	1	0	3	1	1	1	0	0	1	8	11	1
Puerto Rico	1	0	1	0	0	0	1	0	0	3	11	3
WP: Bill Werle (1-1) LP: Pete Wojey (1-1); Home runs: CUB: Julio Bécquer (1); PRI: None

== Statistics leaders ==
Statistic	Player	Team	Total
Batting average	(United States) Solly Drake	(Cuba) Tigres de Marianao	.500
Home runs	(Puerto Rico) Luis Márquez	(Puerto Rico) Indios de Mayagüez	2
Runs batted in	(Cuba) Minnie Miñoso	(Cuba) Tigres de Marianao	7
Runs batted in	(United States) Hal R. Smith	(Cuba) Tigres de Marianao	7
Runs	(United States) Solly Drake	(Cuba) Tigres de Marianao	9
Hits	(United States) Solly Drake	(Cuba) Tigres de Marianao	11
Doubles	(United States) John Roseboro	(Venezuela) Leones del Caracas	2
Triples	Five tied		1
Stolen bases	(United States) Solly Drake	(Cuba) Tigres de Marianao	4
Wins	(Panama) Winston Brown	(Panama) Cerveza Balboa	2
Wins	(United States) Jim Bunning	(Cuba) Tigres de Marianao	2
Earned run average	(Venezuela) Emilio Cueche	(Venezuela) Leones del Caracas	0.00
Strikeouts	(United States) George Brunet	(Panama) Cerveza Balboa	17
Innings pitched	(Panama) Winston Brown	(Panama) Cerveza Balboa	18.0

== Awards ==
Tournament Awards
Award	Player	Team
MVP	(United States) Solly Drake	(Cuba) Tigres de Marianao
Best manager	(Cuba) Napoléon Reyes	(Cuba) Tigres de Marianao

All Star Team
Position	Player	Team
First base	(United States) Bob Speake	(Puerto Rico) Indios de Mayagüez
Second base	(Venezuela) Pompeyo Davalillo	(Venezuela) Leones del Caracas
Third base	(Panama) Clyde Parris	(Panama) Cerveza Balboa
Shortstop	(Cuba) José Valdivielso	(Cuba) Tigres de Marianao
Left field	(Cuba) Minnie Miñoso	(Cuba) Tigres de Marianao
Center field	(United States) Solly Drake	(Cuba) Tigres de Marianao
Right field	(Puerto Rico) Luis Márquez	(Puerto Rico) Indios de Mayagüez
Catcher	(United States) Hal R. Smith	(Cuba) Tigres de Marianao
Pitcher	(Panama) Winston Brown	(Panama) Cerveza Balboa

== See also ==
- Ballplayers who have played in the Series

== Sources ==
- Antero Núñez, José. Series del Caribe. Jefferson, Caracas, Venezuela: Impresos Urbina, C.A., 1987.
- Gutiérrez, Daniel. Enciclopedia del Béisbol en Venezuela – 1895-2006 . Caracas, Venezuela: Impresión Arte, C.A., 2007.
