= Enrique Maroto =

Cuban baseball player

- Pitcher
- Born: September 7, 1935 (age 90); Havana, Cuba
- Bats: Left Throws: Left

Enrique Maroto (born September 7, 1935) is a Cuban former professional pitcher who played in Minor League Baseball and the Negro leagues. Listed at 5' 6" (1.68 m.), 165 lb. (74 kg.), Maroto batted and threw left handed. He was born in Havana, Cuba.

Although undersized, Maroto was a hard-throwing pitcher and fiery competitor. He started his career in his native Cuba, then in 1952 he went to Canada to play for the Brandon Greys of the Mandak League.

Afterwards, Maroto pitched from 1955 to 1956 for the Kansas City Monarchs of the Negro American League, appearing in both the 1955 and 1956 East–West All-Star Game.

Known most for pulling double duty with the Monarchs, Maroto would often pitch the entire first game and play the outfield during the second game of a doubleheader. Eventually, he got used to pitch several times in both games the same day.

In 1955, Maroto pitched a five-hitter, complete game victory against the Detroit Stars in the first game of a double header, only to return in the second game and hurled the final seven innings for the deuce. Three weeks later, he repeated this feat against the Birmingham Barons with a four-hit shutout in the first game and picked up another win in relief duties.

For good measure, Maroto also delivered a strong pitching performance in the 1955 East-West All-Star Game, striking out seven batters in two shutout innings of relief while saving the 2-0 victory for the West team.

In the 1956 All-Star Game, Maroto opened at center field for the West team and was placed fourth in the batting order. He led the West Stars with two hits in the 11-5 defeat to the East team.

Thereafter, Maroto spent 1957 with the Rojos de Fresnillo of the Mexican Center League. He then was signed by the Washington Senators and assigned to their farm team in the South Atlantic League, where he pitched from 1958 to 1959 for the Charlotte Hornets, one of the first integrated professional baseball teams in the league and in North Carolina.

In 1960 Maroto returned to his native Cuba to play for the Havana Sugar Kings of the International League, a Triple-A affiliate of the Cincinnati Reds. Nevertheless, his performance was interrupted by the calamitous effects of the political relations between Cuba and the United States. As a result, the Sugar Kings were notified that they would be relocating to Jersey City, New Jersey, where they would eventually be renamed the Jersey City Jerseys.

Maroto then opted to sign a contract to play for the Sultanes de Monterrey of the Mexican League. He spent one and a half season with the Sultanes before joining the Diablos Rojos del México in the 1961 midseason.

In between, Maroto also played winter ball in Cuba for the Tigres de Marianao club in the 1956–57, 1957–58 and 1958–59 seasons. During this period he was part of pitching staffs that featured Al Cicotte, Mike Fornieles, Bob Mabe, Connie Marrero, Rudy Minarcin, Bob Shaw and Bill Werle, all of them with major league experience. Marianao clinched the 1956-57 pennant and advanced to the 1957 Caribbean Series, winning the tournament title under manager Nap Reyes.

After two seasons playing in Mexico, Maroto retired from professional baseball and settled in Miami, Florida.

In 2008, Major League Baseball staged a special draft of the surviving Negro league players, doing a tribute for those ballplayers who were kept out of the Big Leagues because of their race. MLB clubs each drafted a former NLB player, and Maroto was selected by the Miami Marlins.
