= Emilio Cueche =

Venezuelan baseball player (1927–2006)

- Pitcher / Outfielder
- Born: October 20, 1927; Barcelona, Anzoátegui, Venezuela
- Died: July 31, 2006 (aged 78); Valencia, Carabobo, Venezuela
- Batted: Right Threw: Right

Teams
- Venezuelan League: Cervecería Caracas (1950–1951); Sabios de Vargas (1951–1953); Gavilanes de Maracaibo (1953–1954); Santa Marta de La Guaira (1954–1955); Magallanes (1954–1955); Industriales de Valencia (1955–1960); Leones del Caracas (1960–1962); Dominican Republic League: Águilas Cibaeñas (1952–1953); International League: Havana Sugar Kings (1954–1960); Mexican League: Diablos Rojos del México (1960; 1962)

Career highlights and awards
- Venezuelan League Rookie of the Season Award (1951-52); Venezuelan League Player of the Season Award (1954-55); Six Caribbean Series appearances (1952; 1954–1958)

Member of the Venezuelan

Baseball Hall of Fame
- Induction: 2006
Medals
Men's baseball
Representing Venezuela
Latin American Series
Silver medal – second place	1952 Caracas	Team

Emilio Cueche [eh-mee'-leo / coo-eh'-chay] (October 20, 1927 – July 31, 2006) was a Venezuelan professional baseball player. He was nicknamed "Indio".

Born in Barcelona, Anzoátegui, the righthander Cueche was one of the most dominant pitchers in the Venezuelan Professional Baseball League during the decade of the 1950.

Cueche tried to starting out as a shortstop. He was short, stocky, but uncommonly strong and well fit. At 5-foot-6 (1.68 m), 160 pounds (73 kg), Cueche might not have had the physique of most of his contemporaries, though he relied on pitches to establish himself as one of the most trustworthy pitchers of his era.

Besides a lively fastball, his repertoire included a slider, a knuckler, a changeup and a curve, being the latter one of his most effective pitches.

Through his brief career, Cueche set several records in the VPBL that still remain intact. Considered a workhorse who could pitch deep into games, he also was known as a slick-fielding pitcher and competent hitter as well. As a result, Cueche was often used in a pinch-hitting role, and also played in the outfield due to his defensive skills.

Apart from his 12-season stint in the Venezuela league, he made six Caribbean Series appearances and played nine full seasons in Minor League Baseball and the Dominican Republic and Mexico leagues during the same period.

== Professional career ==
=== Debut season 1950-51 ===
Cueche made his professional debut during the winter of 1950–1951 with the Cervecería Caracas of the Venezuelan League. The Cervecería club was guided by experienced manager José Antonio Casanova, who used Cueche in a relatively low-pressure role as a middle reliever before giving him a spot in the starting rotation late in the season. The young pitcher responded with a 5–2 record and a 3.28 earned run average in 15 games. He completed three of his five starts, giving up 59 hits and 33 walks, while striking out 23 batters in 57 2/3 innings pitched. He also collected 12 hits in 54 at bats for a .222 average in 28 games, which included two doubles, one home run, nine runs and six RBI. After the season, he earned Rookie of the Year honors.

=== 1951-52 ===
Cueche was assigned to the Sabios de Vargas in 1951–1952, as he posted a 6–7 record and a 3.76 ERA in 23 of the 54 games of the team. He completed five of his nine starts, racking up more walks (62) than strikeouts (59) in 117 1/3 innings, a work overload for a young pitcher, even though he showed tendency to fall behind in the count, making it harder for him to get an out. In addition, he hit .204 (10-for-49) and slugged .286 in 31 games. He then served as a reinforcement in the Navegantes del Magallanes during the 1952 Caribbean Series, where he tossed 2 2/3 scoreless innings in two relief appearances, giving up two singles, while striking out two and walking one batter.

But the control issues did not last long for a player propelled by a natural talent and willingness to work out his proven deficiencies. Progressing rapidly, Cueche showed positive results in a short-term period. After the Series ended, he joined the Águilas Cibaeñas club of the now extinct Dominican Republic Summer League.

In 1952 the Águilas won the season pennant, led by veteran pitcher Terris McDuffie, who posted a 14–3 record for a .824 winning percentage. Meantime, Tigres del Licey outfielder Luis Olmo paced the hitters with a .344 average, while teammate Alonzo Perry claimed the home run title with 11 round-trippers. Other than that, most of the Dominican Republic news headlines were dedicated to the Venezuelan Cueche, who went 9–9 with a 2.80 ERA, and topped the league both in strikeouts (101) and innings (148). Moreover, he collected a solid 2.80 ERA and batted .271, but gained notoriety when he defeated pitching ace Rubén Gómez and the rival Tigres de Licey in town, during the decisive seventh game of the final series, by a score of 4–1. Notably, it was the first championship title in the long storied history of the franchise.

Cueche returned with Vargas in the 1952–1953 season. This time he spent more time in the outfield corners, due to a sore arm. He hit .309 (38-for-123) with 16 RBI and 13 runs scored in 44 games, including 10 doubles, one triple and three stolen bases. He slugged .407 and collected the fourth-highest batting average in the four-team league. As a pitcher, he went 3–5 with a 5.37 ERA in just 13 games, along with nine starts, two complete games, 31 strikeouts, and 19 walks in 58 2/3 innings, improving his SO/BB ratio from 0.95 to 1.63. A few weeks later, he came back to the Dominican Republic to play for the Águilas.

The 1953 DRSL season was claimed by the Tigres del Licey. The team was again led by Perry, who repeated as home run titleholder with 11. Estrellas de Oriente slugger Tetelo Vargas captured the batting title with an average of .355, whilst teammate Wilmer Fields showed his success as a two-way player, collecting a 5–2 pitching record and a .393 average in 107 at-bats. On this occasion, McDuffie went 8–4 with a 2.53 ERA for the second place Águilas. Nevertheless, Cueche walked off with most of the pitching honors, as he led the league with 13 victories, 96 strikeouts, 13 complete games, and 161 innings pitched. In addition, Cueche delivered a heroic effort on July 19, 1953, when he hurled a 17-inning, 3–2 complete game victory over the rival Licey club. At the end of the contest, the enthusiastic Águilas fans lifted Cueche up on their shoulders, and carried him triumphantly through the streets of Santiago de los Caballeros to his home, which was relatively near the ballpark.

Cueche went 13–10 with a 3.63 ERA in 33 of the 78 games of his team, while setting regular season records with 18 complete games, five shutouts and 208 innings pitched, feats that never have been matched in Venezuelan baseball. Moreover, he finished one win behind co-leaders Ramón Monzant and Thornton Kipper, and surpassed Tommy Byrne (12), Howie Fox (12) and Ralph Beard (10). With his 208 innings, he beat his counterparts Monzant (187), Kipper (167), Beard (156), Fox (140) and Byrne (119). It was a season dominated by strong pitching, particularly coming from the aforementioned big leaguers, whom Cueche faced on more than one occasion. And, although he also led in losses, Cueche was one of the hardest men in the league to beat, and several times he lost only by the failure of the Gavilanes to score even one run for him.

=== 1954 summer series and international league ===
Cueche later served as a reinforcement for the Pastora champion team during the 1954 Caribbean Series, where he made two relief appearances. In Game 7, against the Alacranes de Almendares of Cuba, he came to rescue Fox with runners on second and third and one out in the third inning. He struck out Angel Scull with relative ease, but gave a walk to Earl Rapp. Then, with bases loaded and two outs, he struck out Julio Bécquer to end the threat, and followed with a scoreless inning of work in the next frame. After that, Cueche replaced Beard early in Game 10 against Puerto Rico's Criollos de Caguas, lasting 7 1/3 innings while giving up one run on six hits. He finished with a 1.04 ERA in 8 2/3 innings in the Series and did not have a decision.

During the 1954 summer he reported to the Havana Sugar Kings, which joined the International League as the Triple A affiliate of the Cincinnati Reds in that season. The team was managed by Regino Otero and played its home games at Gran Stadium in Havana, Cuba. Cueche was part of a pitching rotation which featured Hooks Iott, Jiquí Moreno, Ken Raffensberger and Saul Rogovin, all of them with major league experience. He ended with a 13–12 record and a team-best 12 complete games, including one shutout and a 4.80 ERA, giving up 79 walks and striking out 104 batters in 180 innings. He also helped himself with the bat, hitting .307 (23-for-75) and slugging .360 with four doubles, nine runs and 13 RBI, in 57 games as a two-way player for the fifth-place team. At that time he had amassed almost 400 innings pitched between his winter and summer seasons and the Caribbean Series. But he did not show signs of fatigue and went to play winter ball in the Venezuelan league.

=== 1954-55 VPBL season: Santa Marta ===
The VPBL resumed its activities in the 1954–1955 season, while Cueche found himself on the move again. This time he was allocated to the Santa Marta de La Guaira, which entered the league as a replacement for the departed Vargas club. Cueche was named by manager Red Kress as the Opening Day starter in a rotation that included Bill Werle, Bill Kennedy and Julián Ladera.

In a stellar performance, Cueche won 50 percent of his last-place team's games and topped the league in complete games (13) and pitching appearances (29). His nine wins finished two behind league-leader Ramón Monzant, and his 2.09 ERA was the third best behind José Bracho (1.80) and Monzant (2.00). He also ended third in strikeouts (77), being surpassed only by Monzant (98) and Don Bessent (78). In addition, his 16 starts were second to the 17 of Ben Flowers and his 146 2/3 innings ranked him third, following Monzant (153.0) and Bessent (151 2/3). Cueche was awarded by the press as the Best Player of the Season, locked in a close race with Monzant, as well as with champion bat Harold Bevan (.350) and slugger Bob Lennon, who led the league in home runs (9) and RBI (37). He then was included on the postseason roster of the pennant-winning Magallanes to fortify the squad for the Caribbean Series.

=== 1955 Caribbean Series ===
The 1955 Caribbean Series was held at Estadio Universitario in Caracas, the capital city of Venezuela, which boosted capacity to 22,690 seats. All of that set the stage for Game 4, a contest that stands as one of the most memorable games in Caribbean Series history. In this contest, Cueche scattered two hits in a complete game duel with Almendares ace Joe Hatten, who limited Magallanes to four hits. Cueche turned in a brilliant performance against the powerful Cuban team, throwing a no-hitter through six innings, even though he was the losing pitcher.

On two days of rest, Cueche and Hatten pitched through fatigue and faced again in Game 10 of the Series. The Venezuelan clearly won the rematch in a decisive manner and secured a second place for his team. He came back from a three-run deficit in the fourth inning to defeat Almendares, 6–4, capping another duel between the two squads. Overall, he allowed four earned runs on nine hits and two walks, including a three-run homer to Triandos, and struck out eight batters to earn his second consecutive complete game effort. Additionally, he went 1-for-3 and started his second double play of the tournament (1-4-3).

Afterward, Cueche was one of three pitchers selected for the Series All-Star team, joining Bill Greason and Sad Sam Jones of the Puerto Rico's Cangrejeros de Santurce.

=== International League 1955 ===
But things got better for Cueche when he returned to the International League in 1955. In that year the improved Havana Sugar Kings climbed to third place in their second season, following an 87–66 record, behind the Montreal Royals and Toronto Maple Leafs Canadians teams. The Sugar Kings received a strong effort from Cueche, who posted a 12–10 record with a 2.97 ERA and two shutouts, while leading the team in starts (24), complete games (9), strikeouts (121) and innings pitched (197 1/3). He also batted .239 and slugged .308 as a pitcher-outfielder, including one home run, 16 runs, and 16 RBI in 77 of the 153 games of the team. Otero was selected as the Manager of the Year, earning 20 of the possible 35 votes, even though the Sugar Kings could not get past Toronto in the first round of the playoffs, losing in five games.

=== 1955-56: Industriales de Valencia ===
While Cueche reported to camp training the following VPBL season, he did not have a clear idea of his destination. Amidst a bevy of financial problems, the Santa Marta franchise was sold and renamed Industriales de Valencia before the 1955–1956 season. Valencia retained the services of some Santa Marta players as Julián Ladera and Cueche, and introduced Regino Otero as the team's manager. Otero, besides managing the Sugar Kings, also served as a scout in the Cincinnati Reds organization. He had mentored and signed numerous Latino players who went on to play for the Sugar Kings, as was the case of Cueche. The veteran pitcher responded with a 7–6 record and a 3.40 ERA in 22 games for the Industriales, leading the staff with 70 strikeouts and 116 1/3 innings pitched. Notably, Otero guided Valencia to a championship in its inaugural season. As the league champions, the team represented Venezuela in the 1956 Caribbean Series. But Cueche struggled in the Series, sporting an ERA of 7.50 in six innings without a decision, for a disappointing Valencia that finished in last place with a 1–5 record.

When Jerry Lane, Rudy Minarcin and Charlie Rabe joined the Sugar Kings' starting rotation in 1956, Cueche was relegated to a long relief role. As a result, most of the time he was able to kept the game under control and filled in as a spot starter when necessary. And he handled Otero's decision with class and maturity, going 6–2 with a 2.68 ERA in 23 games, including seven starts and two complete games, while striking out 36 and walking 32 in 84 innings. The changes made did not resolve all the problems of the team. Even though the Sugar Kings outscored its opponents 591–589, the team was unable to carry the load for its anemic offensive output and erratic defense, ending next to last in batting average (.250) and last in fielding percentage (.969). Otero, who started the season managing the team, was replaced by Napoleón Reyes during the mid-season, while the Sugar Kings ended in sixth place with a 72–82 record.

=== 1956-57 ===
Cueche came back to Valencia and regained the confidence of Otero during the 1956–1957 season. At this point, he was officially named Opening Day starter and delivered one of his most productive seasons in the league, compiling a 12–5 record and a 3.33 ERA in 23 games, including 13 starts, seven complete games, 32 walks, 48 strikeouts, and 121 2/3 innings pitched. As a batter, he went 16-for-59 (.308) with a double, one home run, nine RBI, and nine runs scored in 25 games. Moreover, he led the league in winning percentage (.706) and wins (four more than Babe Birrer and Connie Grob), ending third in ERA and fourth both in innings and complete games. Valencia advanced to the postseason, but was beat by the Leones del Caracas in the best-of-seven championship series, four to one games. Cueche then played as a reinforcement for the Leones team in the 1957 Caribbean Series, where he took a 2–1 loss to Panama, after giving up two unearned runs in a complete-game performance in Game 5. He later hurled two scoreless innings of relief against Cuba in Game 10 to collect a perfect 0.00 ERA, the best for the Series.

For the fourth straight season, Cueche returned to the Sugar Kings in 1957. Under Reyes, the team ended with a 72–82 record and repeated its sixth-place performance this year. Alternating between spot starts and relief work, Cueche went 10–11 with a 3.83 ERA in 38 games, including 22 starts, seven complete games and two shutouts, striking out 100 and walking 55 in 169 innings. He then went back to Valencia during the winter.

=== 1957-58: new league format ===
1957–1958 was the first season that interleague play started in Venezuelan baseball history. Valencia, with Otero at the helm, captured its third Venezuelan League title in four years. The team later defeated the Rapiños de Occidente of the rival Western League, en route to the championship and a trip to the 1958 Caribbean Series. Once again, Cueche was a mainstay for the Industriales, leading the team's starters with an 8–4 record, a 3.84 ERA, and 109 2/3 innings of work in the regular season. He also recorded the third-best ERA in the league after Charlie Beamon (2.49) and Ramón Monzant (2.55), having one fewer win that Beamon and Monzant, while his seven complete games were only surpassed by the 11 of Monzant. Besides, he posted a best team average of .345 as a two-way player, overmatching teammates Lou Limmer (.308), Lenny Green (.306), Jim Frey (.304) and Earl Battey (.299). He then went 4–0 in his four playoff starts, completing all of them, including a 10-inning victory and a 1.70 ERA in 37 innings. Nonetheless, Cueche was vulnerable in the 1958 Series, as he went 0–1 with a 3.95 ERA in two starts and one relief appearance. It was his last performance in the Caribbean tournament.

In 1958 the Sugar Kings suffered the worst collapse in franchise history. Manager Reyes was replaced by Tony Pacheco early in the year, but the Havana season was up-and-down for the most part, as the team finished last in the eight-team league with a 65–88 record. Despite pitching for the struggling team, Cueche posted a record of 14–13 and a 3.59 ERA in 24 starts, including 10 complete games, five shutouts, and 103 strikeouts in 178 innings. He also led the team in wins, surpassing Mike Cuellar (13), Orlando Peña (11) and Rudy Árias (7), while tying for ninth in the league along Gary Blaylock, Bennie Daniels and Bill Harris. Besides, his five shutouts tied him for the league lead, along with Blaylock, Cuellar, Bob Giallombardo and Tommy Lasorda. In addition, Cueche often was used as a pinch hitter, totaling a .234 average with four doubles, one triple, one home run, and 22 RBI in 74 games (including 37 pitching appearances).

=== 1958-59 ===
Following that, Cueche had an efficient winter in 1958–1959 with the Industriales, going 7–5 with a 3.18 ERA in 16 appearances, including 12 starts, six complete games and 90 2/3 innings. Valencia won the VPBL pennant but was eliminated in the first round of the interleague playoffs. After the season ended, Cueche attended the Sugar Kings spring training camp.

Guided by Preston Gómez, the 1959 Havana Sugar Kings rose to third place in the regular season and upset the Columbus Jets and the Richmond Virginians for a berth in the Junior World Series. Cueche was the fourth man in a rotation that featured Mike Cuellar, Ted Wieand, Walt Craddock and Vicente Amor. He went 9–8 with a 3.95 ERA and 10 complete games in 22 starts, and hit .229 (16-for-75) with eight RBI in 37 games. After clinching International League title, the Sugar Kings defeated the Minneapolis Millers of the American Association in the Junior Series through the maximum of seven games.

=== 1959-60 ===
Subsequently, Cueche dropped precipitously in the 1959–1960 VPBL season. And it seemed like the heavy workload of previous years might have caught up with him, as he showed a 2–2 record and a 5.62 ERA in six games after working in just 24 innings.

Meanwhile, the Havana Sugar Kings remained active until July 1960, when MLB Commissioner Ford C. Frick announced that the franchise would be moving to Jersey City, New Jersey and be renamed the Jersey City Jerseys, in accordance with the United States embargo against Cuba. And the defending champions felt the impact of the conflict, ending in fifth place with a 76–77 record, 23 1/2 games out of contention, with Tony Castaño and Napoleón Reyes sharing the managing duties.

That season, Cueche had not fully recovered. He went 0–3 with a 4.50 in 14 pitching appearances for the team, including two starts and only 42 innings of work. Still, he helped with the bat, going 9-for-31 for a .290 average in 26 games. He then moved to the Diablos Rojos del México late in the midseason, finishing 3–4 with an 8.80 ERA in 13 games. As a hitter, he batted 12-for-32 for a .375 average in 22 games.

=== 1960-61 ===
In 1960–1961, after five seasons with Valencia, Cueche was granted free agency status and signed a contract to play for the Leones del Caracas. He pitched mainly out of the bullpen, appearing in 19 games (nine starts) and going 6–6 with a 3.21 ERA in 103 2/3 innings. He did not play during the summer, but returned with Caracas in 1961–1962. He finished with a 2–4 record and a 3.14 ERA in 16 games, during what turned out to be his final season in the Venezuelan league.

=== Final year ===
Cueche was not ready to call it a career quite yet, though, and returned to the Diablos Rojos del México in the summer of 1962 at age 34, but failed in the intent. He pitched in only 14 games (eight starts), sporting a record of 1–5 and a 4.63 ERA in 68 innings.

In a 13-year career, he posted a 177–159 record with a .527 win-loss % and a 3.55 ERA in 2771 1/3 innings of work (including postseason games).

== Life after baseball ==
After quitting baseball, Cueche returned to Valencia, Carabobo, where he resided for the rest of his life. He was never tempted to resume a career in any aspect of baseball, but he still liked to play softball in the City league.

Cueche died of unknown causes in July 2006 at the age of 78. Four months later, he was enshrined into the Venezuelan Baseball Hall of Fame and Museum as part of its third class.

In addition, a baseball stadium is named after him in his birthplace Barcelona.

== Pitching statistics ==
Some statistics are incomplete because there are no records available at the time of the request.

Regular season

Years	League	W	L	W-L%	ERA	GP	GS	CG	SHO	SV	IP	HA	RA	ER	SO	BB	Ref
1950–1962	VEN	80	64	.556	3.42	229	128	75			1217 1/3	1239		463	640	406	
1952–1953	DOM	22	20	.524	2.73						309 1/3			94	197		
1954–1960	IL	64	59	.520	3.74	221	128	50			1005.0	984	481	418	549	345	
1960; 1962	MEX	4	9	.308	6.27	27	15	6			112.0	126	83	78	42		

Postseason

Years	League	W	L	W-L%	ERA	GP	GS	CG	SHO	SV	IP	HA	RA	ER	SO	BB	Ref
1956–1959; 1961–1962	VEN (four times)	6	4	.600	3.36	10	10	6			69 2/3	65		26	35	19	
1952; 1954–1958	Caribbean Series (six times)	1	3	.250	2.33	14	6	3	0	1	58.0	54	22	15	33	15	
