= Julián Ladera =

Venezuelan baseball player

- Pitcher
- Born: July 15, 1928; Carmen de Uria, Vargas, Venezuela
- Died: September 14, 1973 (aged 45); Valencia, Carabobo, Venezuela
- Batted: Right Threw: Right

Teams
- Venezuelan baseball: Cervecería Caracas (1949–1951); Navegantes del Magallanes (1951–1952; 1964–1965); Patriotas de Venezuela (1951–1953; 1954–1955); Leones del Caracas (1953–1954); Santa Marta BBC (1954–1955); Industriales de Valencia (1955–1959; 1960–1963; 1963–1964); Rapiños de Occidente (1959–1960); Estrellas Orientales (1963–1964); Minor leagues: York White Roses (1952–1953); Wichita Indians (1953); Havana Sugar Kings (1955–1956); Mexican baseball: Tecolotes de Nuevo Laredo (1956); Leones de Yucatán (1956–1958); Aguilas de Veracruz (1960–1961)

Career highlights and awards
- Three Caribbean Series appearances (1956–1958); Mexican League All-Star (1956–1957)

Member of the Venezuelan

Baseball Hall of Fame
- Induction: 2015

Julián Ladera [who-lee-an' / lah-day'-rah] (July 15, 1928 – September 14, 1973) was a Venezuelan professional baseball pitcher. Listed at 5 ft 10 in (1.78 m), 165 lb (75 kg), he batted and threw right-handed.

A reliable and durable pitcher, Ladera spent 16 years in the Venezuelan Professional Baseball League from 1949 through 1965. Although a starter for most of his career, he also filled significant relief roles coming out of the bullpen, serving as a closer, middle reliever, or set-up man as well. His repertoire of pitches included a heavy fastball, a changeup, and a curve which he threw from a sidearm angle.

Notably, Ladera also hurled in the Minor leagues, Mexican baseball and the Caribbean Series during the same span of time, being comfortable in his jack-of-all-trades role along the way in the many leagues in which he played.

== Early life ==
Ladera was born in Carmen de Uria, a ghost village of the State of Vargas located in the north coastal region of Venezuela. He grew up and was raised in Catia La Mar, one of the most important cities located in Vargas state and a strong fan base of the Tiburones de La Guaira baseball club. As a teenager, he played sandlot ball and later joined a local amateur team. He then heard about Venezuelan league tryouts in Caracas and went with about 50 other players. Only a few of them made the cut to keep, including him. Ladera had no baseball position, but the league was urged for hard-throwing pitchers, so he seemed like a good candidate for the mound. It took a few years to take his raw talent and turn him into a genuine pitcher.

== Professional career ==
=== Venezuelan baseball ===
Ladera moved around for a while, as the Venezuelan league shifted players as needed to help teams stay afloat. He made his professional debut during the winter of 1949–1950 with the Cervecería Caracas club. He played for them in two seasons, before joining the Navegantes del Magallanes in 1951–1952 and then found himself on the move again, this time to the Patriotas de Venezuela during the midseason. He emerged with the Patriotas in 1952–1953, leading the league in shutouts (3) and complete games (8), while recording a solid 3.35 earned run average in 22 games. He finished with a win–loss record of 6–9, even though he suffered from lack of run support. He then moved to the Santa Marta BBC in 1954–1955.

Ladera amassed a 17–31 record and a 4.66 ERA in 106 games during his first six seasons in the league. Finally, he found stability after moving to the Industriales de Valencia for the next eight seasons.

Ladera quickly became a household name and a reference point in the Industriales de Valencia history. The Industriales joined the league in the 1965–1966 season as a replacement for the Santa Marta club. They won five season titles, four championships and three sub-championships in its 13-season history, representing Venezuela in the first stage of the Caribbean Series in the 1956 and 1958 tournaments.

In his first season for Valencia, Ladera led the league in ERA (2.41) and relief appearances (23), pitching also a complete game in four starts, while compiling a 6–2 record with 22 strikeouts in 71.0 innings pitched. He led the team in games pitched (27) and tied his pal Jim Pearce for the most wins, being surpassed only by Ron Mrozinski (8) and Emilio Cueche (7). Managed by Regino Otero, the Industriales won the title with a 33–21 record in its debuting season and advanced to the 1956 Caribbean Series. Ladera made three relief appearances in the Series and did not have a decision.

In 1956–1957 he went 6–4 with a 3.78 ERA in 22 games, including four starts, one complete game, and a career-high 123 2/3 innings. Valencia won again the title, but lost to the Leones del Caracas in the championship series. He then served as a reinforcement in the Leones roster during the 1957 Caribbean Series, where he tossed 3 1/3 scoreless innings in two relief appearances, and also hurled a 7–3 complete game victory over Duke Maas and the Indios de Mayagüez of Puerto Rico in Game 7 of the Series. In the match, Ladera allowed three earned runs on six hits and three walks, while striking out five on a talented lineup that featured Bob Aspromonte, Canena Márquez, Herb Plews, Bob Smith and Bob Speake, among others.

Ladera continued to develop his skills in 1957–1958, sporting a 6–6 record and a 3.70 ERA in a league-best 21 games pitched, while hurling three complete games in 13 starts and 99 2/3 innings of work. Meanwhile, Valencia won the pennant with a 28–18 record. Following a previous agreement between the Venezuelan League and the rival Western Baseball League, the interleague playoff games would be played immediately following the end of their respective seasons. As a result, the winning team would represent Venezuela in the 1958 Caribbean Series. Then, the Industriales swept the Rapiños de Occidente, 4–0, in the best-of-seven playoffs en route to the Caribbean Series.

This time Ladera had a subpar performance in the Series, allowing four earned runs on nine hits and five walks in two relief appearances, even though he struck out 10 batters in 10 2/3 innings of labour. In 1958–1959 he was strictly used as a starter, and he responded with an 8–3 record and five complete games in 12 starts. He also led the Industriales pitching staff with a 2.13 ERA in 114.0 innings, while ending second to teammate Gary Blaylock both in wins (9) and innings (129 1/3).

But things got worse when the 1959–1960 VPBL season was suspended on December 24, 1959, because of a players' strike. In limited action, Ladera went 2–3 with a terrible 5.29 ERA in nine games. Then, he moved temporarily to the Rapiños of the neighbor Western League for the rest of the season. Already, too, there were some concerns about his throwing arm, as he was 1–1 with an 8.31 ERA in just six games. The Rapiños, who claimed the league's championship, were invited to participate in the 1960 Caribbean Series to compensate for the absence of the VPBL representative team. Though Ladera was on the team's roster for the Series, he did not make it onto the field once.

Fortunately, Ladera showed good form during the 1960–1961 campaign, going 7–4 with a 2.51 ERA and 100 1/3 innings in 14 games, while completing seven of his 11 starts for Valencia. In addition, he formed part of one of the most legendary pitching performances in winter baseball history, when he faced Rapiños and their pitching ace Gary Peters, a big leaguer for the Chicago White Sox. On January 6, 1961, the two men battled through 11 scoreless innings, under a merciless sun, in a game played at Maracaibo; a very steamy city of Venezuela. After both teams scored a run a piece in the 12th frame, Ladera gave up the game-winning run on a bases-loaded walk to Luis Aparicio in the bottom of the 17th for the final 2–1 score.

He was used sparingly in the next four seasons, appearing in 41 games for the rest of career, which included stints with Magallanes and Estrellas Orientales from 1964 through 1965. He developed arm problems at age 30 and never recovered his old form. At 36, he went 1–4 with 5.25 ERA in 12 games, during what turned out to be his final season in the league. In a 16-season VPBL career, he posted a 60–63 record and a 3.65 ERA in 258 pitching appearances, including 127 starts and 1,113 innings of work.

=== Minor leagues ===
Ladera played from 1952 to 1953 in the St. Louis Browns minor league system. He later pitched from 1955 to 1956 for the Havana Sugar Kings, a Triple-A affiliate of the Cincinnati Reds at the time.

He enjoyed three productive seasons with the Tecolotes de Nuevo Laredo and Leones de Yucatán of the Mexican League from 1956 through 1958, averaging 14 wins in each season, with a career-high 17 in 1957. He also made the All-Star Game three times, while representing Nuevo Laredo in 1956 (two games) and Yucatán in 1957, when the team won its first league title.

Between the Venezuelan and Mexican leagues, he worked more than 310 innings in each of these three years, a very heavy workload for any pitcher. Ladera returned to the Mexican League in 1960 and 1961, but he earned a 19–30 record and a 4.79 ERA while pitching for the Aguilas de Veracruz.

== After baseball ==
Ladera retired in 1965, following his last season in the Venezuelan league. He was a long time resident of Valencia, Carabobo, where he died in 1973 at the age of 45. In 2015, he was enshrined into the Venezuelan Baseball Hall of Fame and Museum.

=== Pitching statistics ===
Some statistics are incomplete because there are no records available at the time of the request.

Regular season

Years	League	W	L	W-L%	ERA	GP	GS	CG	SHO	SV	IP	HA	RA	ER	HR	BB	IBB	SO	HBP	BK	WP	Ref
1949–1965	Venezuela	60	63	.488	3.65	258	127	42			1113.0	1060		452		539		542				
1952–1953	Class B	21	24	.467	3.42	56	42				321.0	316	158	122	6	172						
1953	Class A	1	5	.167	3.63	17	7				62.0	58	41	25	3	37						
1955–1956	Class AAA	7	6	.538	4.07	45	16	4	2		126.0	127	66	57	10	69		65		1	3	
1952–1953; 1955–1956	Mexico (AA)	61	65	.484	3.86	177	120	63			968.0	967	482	411				524				

Postseason

Years	League	W	L	W-L%	ERA	GP	GS	CG	SHO	SV	IP	HA	RA	ER	HR	BB	IBB	SO	HBP	BK	WP	Ref
1957–1959; 1961; 1963–1964	Venezuela (six times)	3	5	.375	2.90	14	10	6			87.0	88		28		32		44				
1956–1958; 1960	Caribbean Series (four times)	1	0	1.000	3.86	8	1	1	0	0	32 2/3	30	17	14	0	14	0	21	0	0	0	
