= Marianao (baseball) =

The Marianao baseball club played in the Cuban Professional League from the 1922–1923 season through to the 1960–1961 season. The club represented the populous town of Marianao in Havana and played their games at La Tropicana Stadium, official site of the league.

== History ==
According to some baseball historians, the Elefantes de Marianao (Marianao Elephants) was the first nickname used by the team. Although it is a little studied topic, the 1923-24 Billiken baseball card set includes pictures 15 cards each for each team that participated in the Cuban league during that season: Almendares, Habana, Santa Clara and Marianao. Indeed, Marianao players are wearing a uniform that shows the head of a white elephant on dark background.

At some point, the team wore gray uniforms and was recognized as the Marianao Frailes Grises (Grey Monks), probably a nickname based on the color of the robes of the Dominican and Augustinian monks that founded Marianao in 1719. Then, in 1948 the franchise was renamed as the Tigres de Marianao (Marianao Tigers), as they are usually cited, and also used a new uniform. Their flannels had black and orange piping with matching socks, perhaps recalling also those of its emblem, the tiger. The team contended until the 1960–1961 period, during what turned out to be the Cuban League's final season.

The Marianao squad participated in 27 Cuban league seasons, finishing in first place four times, second place six times, third place seven times, and in fourth place a league record ten times. The team posted a 729-861 record in 1,590 games for a .458 winning percentage, which was the worst mark of the four Cuban league teams to play over 1,000 games.

Marianao, managed by Merito Acosta, won its first title in the 1922–1923 season, to become the only team after Habana to win the league championship in its inaugural season. They earned its second championship in the 1936–1937 campaign, managed by Martin Dihigo, and clinched consecutive titles in the 1956–1957 and 1957–1958 seasons, guided by Napoleón Reyes. The latter two seasons they won the Caribbean Series, the only Series where they participated, becoming also the first team to win twice in the event's history.

Following the 1959 Cuban Revolution, political tensions rose with the Fidel Castro government. In March 1961, one month after the regular Cuban baseball season ended, the regime decreed the abolition of professional baseball in Cuba.

== Facts ==
During the 1943–1944 season, the Marianao team became part of three rare occurrences in Cuban baseball history.

On December 2, 1943, Ramón Roger of the Elefantes de Cienfuegos pitched 11 scoreless innings against them in one game that went 20 innings and lasted four hours and 25 minutes, the longest game ever played in Cuban baseball history. Roger was credited with the victory, 6–5. Meanwhile, Luis Tiant Sr. blanked Cienfuegos for 14 innings, but was victimized by an error by shortstop Oral (Mickey) Burnette and suffered a heartbreaking loss.

A few days later on December 11, Habana pitcher Manuel García hurled a no-hit, no-run game against Marianao at La Tropicana Stadium. It turned in to be the first no-hitter pitched at La Tropicana since its opening in 1930. Also in the same game, the Marianao infield executed the first triple play at the La Tropical grounds.

== Notable players ==
- José Acosta
- Merito Acosta
- Julio Bécquer
- Harold Bevan
- Jim Bunning
- Jack Calvo
- Tony Castaño
- Pelayo Chacón
- Sandalio Consuegra
- Ray Dandridge
- Solly Drake
- Charlie Dressen
- Freddie Fitzsimmons
- Pedro Formental
- Mike Fornieles
- Silvio García
- Billy Herman
- Buck Leonard
- Adolfo Luque
- Conrado Marrero
- Minnie Miñoso
- Willy Miranda
- Don Newcombe
- Roberto Ortiz
- Emilio Palmero
- Pedro Ramos
- Lázaro Salazar
- Hank Schreiber
- Bob Shaw
- Hal Smith
- Milton Smith
- José Valdivielso
- Bill Werle
- Casey Wise

== See also ==
- 1957 Caribbean Series Summary
- 1958 Caribbean Series Summary
