= Santa Marta (baseball club) =

The Samanes del Santa Marta BBC were a baseball team that played in the Venezuelan Professional Baseball League during the 1954–1955 season. The team represented the city of La Guaira, Vargas, Venezuela, and played its home games at Estadio Universitario de Caracas.

Santa Marta was managed by former big leaguer Red Kress and entered the league as a replacement for the departed Sabios de Vargas, being part of a four-team league that included the Leones del Caracas, Navegantes del Magallanes and Patriotas de Venezuela.

The team was clearly overmatched, finishing in last place with an 18-33 record, 14½ games out of first place. Santa Marta never reached a high level of popularity, failing to encourage a significant fan support, and folded after its first season.

The franchise would be replaced by the Industriales de Valencia in the 1955-1956 tournament.

== Selected players ==
- Vern Benson
- Emilio Cueche
- Hank Foiles
- Joe Frazier
- Bill Kennedy
- Clem Koshorek
- Julián Ladera
- Jesús Mora
- Joe Pignatano
- Dave Pope
- Bob Smith
- Gene Stephens
- Bill Werle

== Sources ==
- Gutiérrez, Daniel; Alvarez, Efraim; Gutiérrez (h), Daniel (2006). La Enciclopedia del Béisbol en Venezuela. LVBP, Caracas. ISBN 980-6996-02-X
- Gutiérrez, Daniel; González, Javier (1992). Numeritos del béisbol profesional venezolano (1946-1992). LVBP, Caracas. ISBN 980-0712-47-X
