= Elmwood Giants =

The name Elmwood Giants has been used since 1905 by various Canadian baseball teams based in the Elmwood community of Winnipeg, Manitoba.

As of 2011, the Elmwood Giants Baseball Club, Inc. operates four teams: the Elmwood Giants Juniors (AAA) (members of the Manitoba Junior Baseball League), the Elmwood Giants Juniors (AA) (members of the Winnipeg Junior Baseball League), the Elmwood Giants Seniors (members of the Winnipeg Senior Baseball League) and the Kildonan Mudcats (also members of the Winnipeg Senior Baseball League).

In addition to the junior teams, there was also an independent minor league team called the Elmwood Giants that played in the Mandak League (Manitoba-North Dakota) in 1950 and 1951. The league was known as a haven for both former Negro League stars and young African-American players working their way up to the major leagues. The Giants had both. 17-year-old Solly Drake was signed by the Chicago Cubs after a good season with the Giants in 1950, and Ted Radcliffe, a six-time all-star in the 1930s and 1940s, managed (and occasionally played for) the 1951 team.

The 2010 edition of the Junior team won the MJBL pennant and the Western Canada Baseball Association Junior AAA championship.

The 2010 edition of the Senior team won the WSBL pennant and the Baseball Manitoba Senior AA All-Stars tournament. They were also finalists (silver medalists) in the Western Canada Baseball Association Senior AA Championship.

== Notable players ==
- Bob Harvey
- Tom Parker
- Solly Drake (player, 1950)
- Ted "Double Duty" Radcliffe (as manager and occasional player, 1951)
- Terry Sawchuk
- John Washington
- Corey Koskie
- Trevor Kidd
- Lloyd Davenport
