= Lloyd Davenport =

American baseball player

- Outfielder
- Born: October 28, 1911; New Orleans, Louisiana, U.S.
- Died: September 1, 1985 (aged 73); New Orleans, Louisiana, U.S.
- Batted: Left Threw: Left
- Stats at Baseball Reference

Teams
- New Orleans Crescent Stars (1934); Philadelphia Stars (1935–1936); Cincinnati Tigers (1937); Memphis Red Sox (1938–1939); Alijadores de Tampico (1940); Birmingham Black Barons (1942); Kansas City Monarchs (1943); Chicago American Giants (1943–1944); Cleveland Buckeyes (1944–1945); Tecolotes de Nuevo Laredo (1945–1946); Alacranes del Almendares (1946–47); Azules de Veracruz (1947–1948); Navegantes del Magallanes (1949–50); Elmwood Giants (1951); Danville Dans (1953)

Career highlights and awards
- 5× East-West All-Star Game selection

Lloyd Benjamon Davenport (October 11, 1911 – September 1, 1985) was an American professional baseball outfielder who played for several clubs of the Negro and Minor leagues during 17 seasons spanning from 1934 to 1953. Listed at 5' 4" (1.65 m), 150 lb. (68 kg), Davenport batted and threw left-handed. Born in New Orleans, Louisiana, he was nicknamed "Ducky".

A five-time Negro league All-Star, he also played in the Cuba, Mexico and Venezuela leagues.

Davenport managed to hit .300 or better in five Negro leagues seasons, collecting batting averages of .302 (1937), .360 (1938), .364 (1939), .333 (1942) and .395 (1945). He later spent four seasons in the Mexican League from 1945 to 1948.

In between, Davenport played winter ball with the Cuban Alacranes del Almendares in the 1946–47 season and for the Venezuelan Navegantes del Magallanes in 1949–50. He later played for the Elmwood Giants of the Mandak League in 1951.

Davenport was 41 years old when he joined the Danville Dans in 1953, during what turned out to be his career's final season.

He died in 1985 in his home of New Orleans, Louisiana, at the age of 73.

== Pro career ==
Davenport joined the Philadelphia Stars of the Negro National League II in 1935. He appeared in 18 games and batted a meager .179 as a reserve outfielder. Davenport served a s aback-up to former all-star Ted Page and Chaney White. Davenport played a second season in Philadelphia before jumping to the Cincinnati Tigers of the Negro American League. It was in Cincinnati under the guidance of player/manager Ted Radcliffe that Davenport became a starter for the first time. His hitting improved as he finished second on the team in batting average, hitting .327 compare to shortstop Howard Easterling who batted .346.

After the season, the Cincinnati Tigers franchise ceased operations and Davenport followed Radcliff to the Memphis Red Sox. Again, Davenport hit over three hundred and when the season ended, he could call himself a champion, as Memphis defeated the Atlanta Black Crackers for the league championship, 2 games to 0. In the series, Davenport went 2-4 and drove in two runs.

Davenport missed the 1940 season, and spent the 1941 season with Memphis before he joined the Birmingham Black Barons and thus began an odyssey that saw him play for several teams over the course of the next several years, including the Kansas City Monarchs and the Cincinnati/Cleveland Buckeyes. Davenport retired from baseball after the 1945 season.
