= Vargas tragedy =

1999 natural disaster in Venezuela

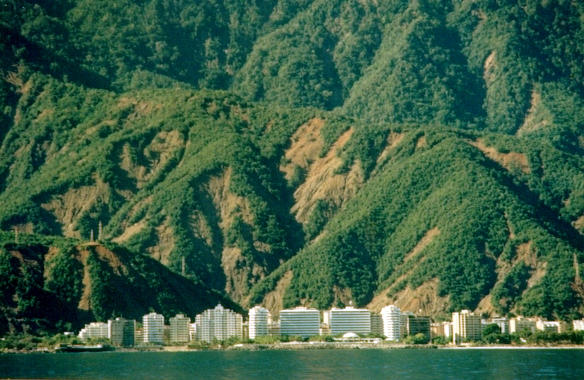
- A part of Vargas state after the disaster, with scars from the mudslides visible on the mountains
- Date: 5–21 December 1999
- Location: Vargas (today La Guaira State), Venezuela; 10°36′18.67″N 66°50′58.21″W
- Deaths: 10,000–30,000
- Location of Vargas in Venezuela

The Vargas tragedy was a natural disaster that occurred in Vargas State (today La Guaira), Venezuela, on 15 December 1999 (over the course of 10 days), when torrential rains caused flash floods and debris flows that killed tens of thousands of people, destroyed thousands of homes, and led to the complete collapse of the state's infrastructure. According to relief workers, the neighborhood of Los Corales was buried under 3 meters (9.8 ft) of mud and a high percentage of homes were simply swept into the ocean. Entire towns including Cerro Grande and Carmen de Uria completely disappeared. As much as 10% of the population of Vargas died during the event. A deadlier natural disaster would not occur until the 2003 Bam earthquake. According to Guinness World Records, it is the deadliest mudslide ever recorded.

== Background ==
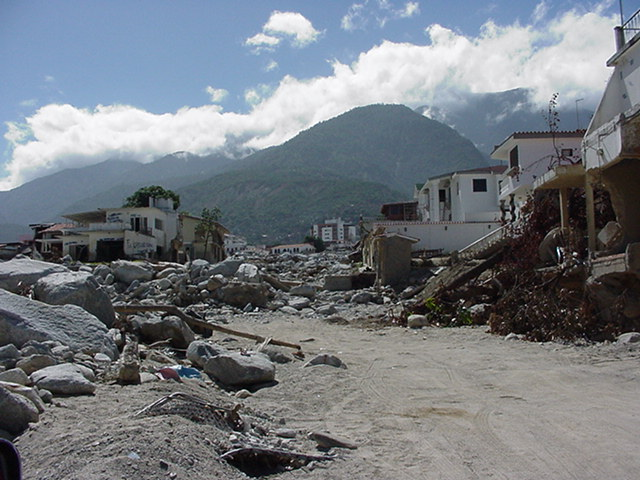
A section of Los Corales, one of the neighborhoods in the Vargas state that suffered the heaviest destruction

The coastal area of Vargas State has long been subject to mudslides and flooding. Deposits preserved on the alluvial fan deltas here show that geologically similar catastrophes have occurred with regularity since prehistoric times. Since the 17th century, at least two large-magnitude debris flow, landslide, or flood events, on average, have occurred each century within the modern boundaries of Vargas. Recorded events occurred in February 1798, August 1912, January 1914, November 1938, May 1944, November 1944, August 1948, and February 1951. In the February 1798 event, flash floods and debris flows severely damaged 219 homes. Spanish soldiers barricaded an upstream-facing entrance to a fort with cannons in order to prevent debris from filling it.

Prior to the 1999 disaster, the most recent major flood had occurred in 1951, but that event did not cause as much damage. Based on aerial photos and records of measurements, geologists were able to directly compare the 1951 event to the 1999 event. The 1951 event involved less rainfall than the 1999 event, fewer landslides were triggered, and less fresh debris was observed on the fans. The unusually strong storm in December 1999 dumped 911 millimeters (35.9 in) of rain over just a few days, triggering widespread soil instability and flow of debris. Adding to the devastation, Vargas State had experienced high population growth and development since the 1951 disaster, thus increasing the toll of casualties.

=== Population density ===
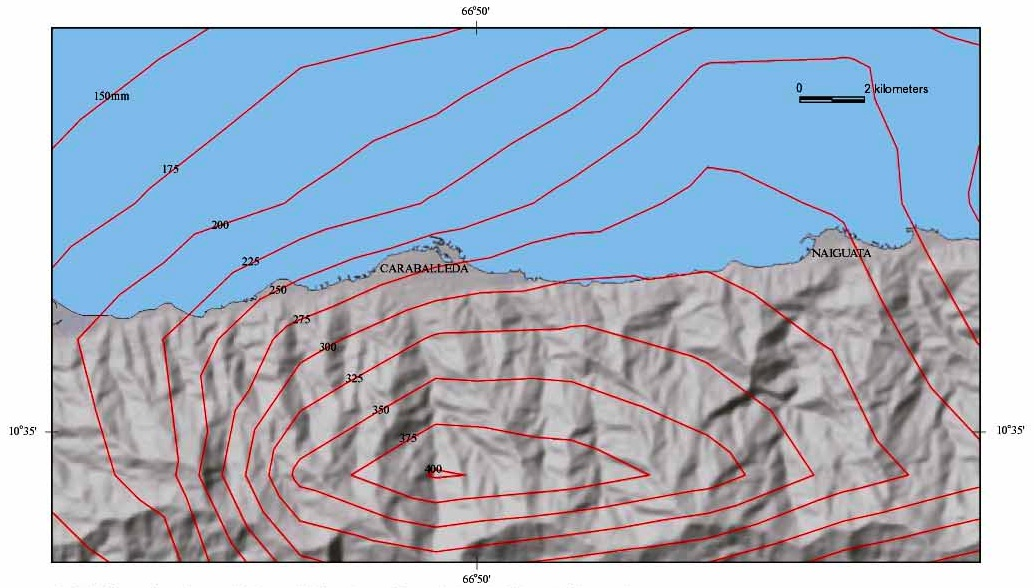
Isohyet (contour of equal precipitation) map of the 14–16 December 1999 storm draped over a shaded relief map of north-central Venezuela

The alluvial fans, built as sediments from floods and debris flows exit their channels and meet the ocean, provide the only extensive flat surfaces along the mountainous coastline of north-central Venezuela. As such, many of them have been extensively developed and urbanized. This high population density increases the risk to life and property from flash flood and debris flow events.

As of 1999, several hundred thousand people lived in this narrow coastal strip in Vargas State. Many of these people lived atop alluvial fans formed by debris flows sourced out of the 2,000-meter (6,600 ft) peaks to their south.

=== Rainfall ===
December 1999 was unusually wet along the north-central Venezuelan coast. The first, and less powerful, storm that month occurred 2–3 December and dropped 200 millimeters (7.9 in) of rain on the coast.

Two weeks later, in a 52-hour span during 14, 15 and 16 December 1999, 911 millimeters (35.9 in) of rain (approximately one year's average total rainfall for the region) was measured on the north-central coast of Venezuela at Simón Bolívar International Airport in Maiquetia, Venezuela. These heavy rains included 72 millimeters (2.8 in) of accumulation in just one hour, between 6 and 7 AM on the 16th; precipitation on both the 15th and 16th exceeded the 1,000-year probability rainfall event. Even so, the coast received much less rain than some regions upstream.

This sudden and intense storm was especially unusual because it occurred in December, while the typical rainy season in coastal Venezuela lasts from May to October. These out-of-season rains formed when a cold front interacted with a moist southwesterly flow in the Pacific Ocean. This interaction produced moderate to heavy rainfall starting in the first week of December and culminating in the 14–16 December event that caused the deadly floods and debris flows.

The heaviest rains were centered around the mid-upper part of the San Julián basin, which feeds water and sediment onto the Caraballeda fan. Heavy rains persisted within 8 kilometers (5.0 mi) of the coast, and subsided on the Caracas side of the Cerro El Ávila. Rainfall rates also decreased westward toward Maiquetía.

=== Geology ===
==== Bedrock ====
The bedrock in the region surrounding Caracas is mainly metamorphic. From the coast and extending approximately 1 kilometer (0.62 mi) inland, deeply foliated schist of the Mesozoic Tacagua Formation is exposed. Soils forming on them are fine-grained (clayey), thin (0.5–3.0 meters (1 ft 8 in – 9 ft 10 in)), and often colluvial. Although the A horizon of the soil is often less than 30 centimeters (12 in) thick, the bedrock is often weathered down to greater than 2 meters (6 ft 7 in). Further inland, gneisses of the Paleozoic San Julián Formation and Precambrian Peña de Mora Formation extend to the crest of the Sierra de Avila. These units have thin soils over less-weathered bedrock; this is believed to be because of rapid erosion due to the steep slopes in this area.

Because foliation planes are planes of weakness, these fabrics within the rocks strongly influence landslide and debris flow hazards. Where the foliation planes are dipping towards a free surface, failure is likely to occur along these planes.

==== Alluvial fan sedimentology and past floods ====
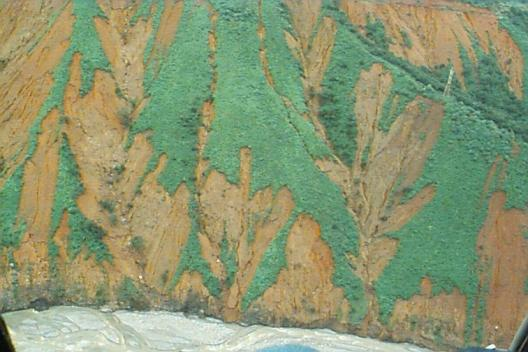
Oversteepened hillslopes failed during the rainstorm, sending landslides of soil into the channels (such as the braided river at bottom) and supplying sediment to flash floods and debris flows. The transmission tower on the right side of the image is 30 meters (98 ft) tall.

The alluvial fans that spread out into the sea from valley mouths were built by previous flood and debris flow events. The modern channel systems of these alluvial fan deltas are incised into previously deposited debris flow and flood material. Scientists at the US Geological Survey measured these old deposits. They found that they are thicker than the December 1999 ones and contain larger boulders. This means that previous debris flows were even larger than those in December 1999 and reached higher velocities.

On the Caraballeda fan, the extent of the 1951 event paled in comparison to the 1999 event. Much of the deposits that constitute the Caraballeda fan are of a thickness similar to those produced in the 1999 event and contain boulders of a size similar to those observed in 1999.

The USGS geologists found paleosols with organic material above and below a 10-meter (33 ft) thick layer of debris flow deposits. The bottom paleosol was radiocarbon dated to 4267 ±38 years Before Present (BP), and the top one was dated to 3720±50 years BP. This means that, at least in this area, the bed aggraded 10 meters (33 ft) in 550 years, for an average rate of about 1.8 cm (0.71 in) per year (though the aggradation occurs only during short-lived events). The scientists were not able to tell whether the deposits were from a single debris flow or multiple events.

==== Surficial geology and geomorphology ====
Alluvial fan deltas in this region have shallow slopes. They are poorly channelized because sediment is being added to them from upstream (infilling the channels) at a rate equal to or greater than the rate at which it can be removed.

Hillslopes are steepened past the angle of repose for noncohesive materials. This oversteepening is more than could be provided for by the frictional resistance of the sandy soils. Internal soil cohesion, negative pore pressure ("soil suction"), soil structure, and/or tree root reinforcement may be responsible for this.

==== Neotectonics ====
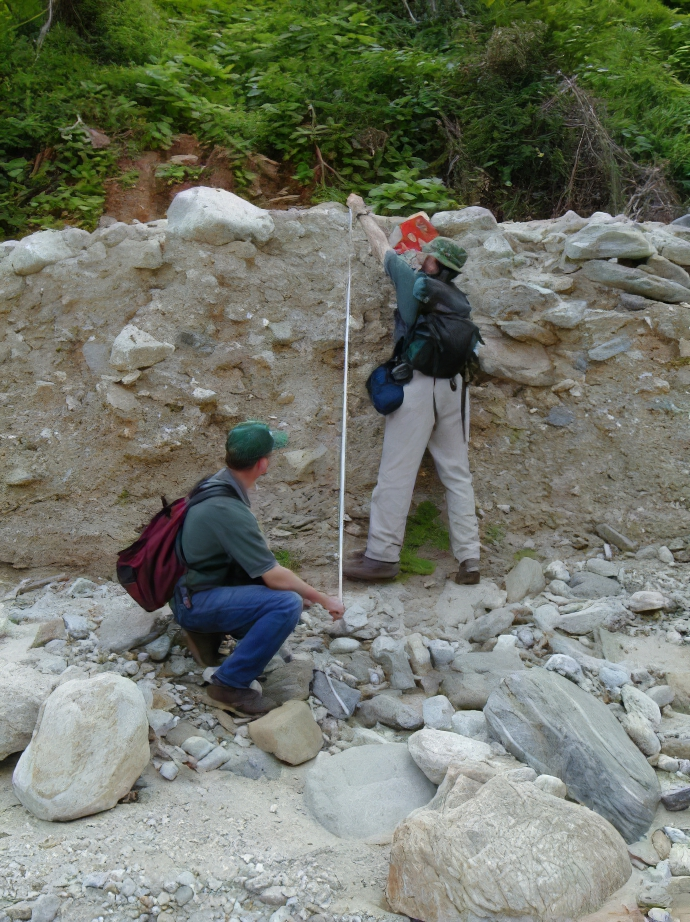
A 2.9-meter (9 ft 6 in) thick debris flow deposit from December 1999 is exposed by river incision during late-stage floods.

Terraces containing previous debris flow deposits are now perched 10–20 meters (33–66 ft) above the modern stream channels. Erosion from the 1999 flood exposed bedrock benches 50 centimeters (20 in) to 2 meters (6 ft 7 in) above the present channel. These abandoned high surfaces suggest recent and continuing tectonic uplift of the Venezuelan coast and corresponding river channel incision. In spite of the fact that most onshore faults active in this region during the Quaternary are mapped as right-lateral strike-slip, it is possible that there is a vertical component of offset in offshore faults.

== Event ==
Heavy rains fell in December 1999 along the north-central coast of Venezuela, culminating in a period of extreme intensity from 14 to 16 December. Starting around 8 PM local time (AST) on 15 December, runoff entered channels and rushed towards the sea, picking up and depositing sediments on its way. Generally after this first wave of flooding, from the coast to just past the crest of the Sierra de Avila, these rains triggered thousands of shallow landslides that stripped soil and rock off the landscape and sent them slipping down the mountainside. Additional water liquefied these landslides into debris flows, which are granular flows in which water mixes with high concentrations of rock and mud. The first eyewitness accounts of debris flows were from 8:30 PM on the 15th, and the final debris flows were reported between 8 and 9 AM on 16 December. Many catchments released multiple debris flows, some of which carried large boulders and tree trunks onto the alluvial fan deltas. Starting between 7 and 9 AM on the 16th and continuing until late that afternoon, a new wave of floods occurred. These floodwaters were less concentrated in sediment and were therefore able to entrain new material and incise new channels into the flood and debris flow deposits from the previous days.

The debris flows moved rapidly, and many of them were highly destructive. Based on the maximum sizes of boulders measured in the flood deposits and the amount by which the flow on the outside of a bend was higher than that on the inside, geologists estimate the flow velocities to range from 3.3–14.5 meters per second (11–48 ft/s). These rapid, bouldery flows resulted in much of the observed destruction.

In addition to these debris flows, flash floods carrying extremely high sediment loads were very dangerous. Together the flash floods and debris flows destroyed hundreds of houses, bridges, and other structures. They incised new channels to depths of several meters into every alluvial fan delta on the Vargas state coastline, and they blanketed these fans with sediment.

=== Caraballeda fan ===
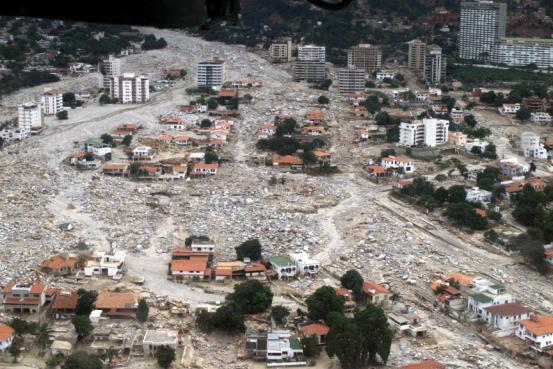
Damage from the debris flow on the Caraballeda fan. The main channel (at left) avulsed to a new course that led it through the houses to the right. These avulsion deposits are up to 6 meters (20 ft) thick and total about 1.8 million cubic meters of boulders and other material.

Of the many communities that were affected by the disaster, the Caraballeda fan was one of the most hard-hit. The intensity of the disaster here is a combination of two factors. First, the Caraballeda fan was heavily urbanized, with many high-rise buildings and multistory houses. Second, it lies at the mouth of the Quebrada San Julián (Saint Julian Ravine), and this watershed produced very large boulders and a massive inundated area. Approximately one-third of the Caraballeda fan was inundated by debris flows, and the entire fan is built of past debris flow deposits.

The floods and debris flows of 1999 did not follow the eastern channel on Caraballeda. This channel, formed during the 1952 floods, had been lined with concrete and designed to safely transport the flows into the sea. Instead, the debris flows overwhelmed the channel and the flows overtopped the banks wherever the channel changed direction. Once free of the culvert, the channel rapidly avulsed across the fan and spread debris throughout the community. These overbank flows demolished 2-story houses and destroyed the first two stories of apartment buildings. Farther down the fan, the debris flows routed themselves down streets. As the flows progressed, they left thinner and thinner deposits, though they often still exceeded 1 meter (3 feet) in thickness. After several avulsions, the channel roughly followed the pre-1951 flood path.

USGS geologists estimate the deposit volume to be at least 1.8 million cubic meters (from comparing topographic scans) or 1.9 million cubic meters (from field measurements). This is among the largest rainfall-induced debris flow deposits in recorded history, though volcanic-induced debris flows can be ten times as large. Subaqueous deposition extended the shoreline an additional 40–60 meters into the sea. The deposit thicknesses range from 4–5 meters (maximum of 5.3 meters) near the center of the fan to around 0.5 meters near the pre-flood shoreline. Maximum boulder sizes decreased towards the shoreline due to the decreasing slope of the fan.

=== Damage ===
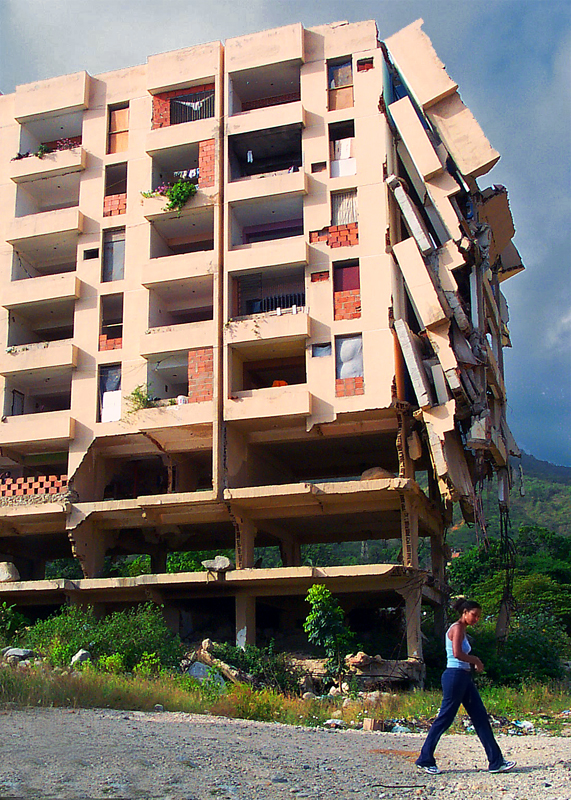
Partially collapsed building; the collapsed area was undercut when debris flows destroyed the bottom floor

The disaster caused estimated damages between $1.79 and $3.5 billion US dollars. The death toll was considered to be between 10,000 and 30,000—the exact number of casualties is difficult to determine as there is no reliable census data from the region at that time, especially about shanty towns and small communities that were completely wiped out. Moreover, only some 1,000 bodies were recovered, with the rest swept to sea by the mud or buried in the landslides. More than 8,000 homes and 700 apartment buildings were destroyed in Vargas, displacing up to 75,000 people. The mudslides significantly altered more than 60 kilometers (37 mi) of the coastline in Vargas. Over 70% of the total population of Vargas State was affected by the disaster. Public services, like water, electricity, phone lines, and land transportation (roads and bridges) completely disappeared in some places. There were no supplies of food and water for months, so most of the population had to be evacuated. Looting and sacking occurred everywhere, forcing the military to implement martial law for more than a year.

== Response ==
The disaster was of such magnitude that the president of the Red Cross initially presumed more than 50,000 dead. The first priority was to evacuate survivors; more than 100,000 people were ultimately evacuated. After the disaster, Venezuelan President Hugo Chávez advocated for other Venezuelans to open up their homes, and "adopt a family". Then-First Lady Marisabel Rodríguez de Chávez arranged the temporary sheltering of children that were feared orphaned in La Casona, the Presidential residence in Caracas. Others offered help, including Major League Baseball shortstop Omar Vizquel, a native Venezuelan, who helped raise over $500,000 in relief funds. After the initial emergency response, focus shifted to analyzing the causes of the disaster, and working to create a sustainable infrastructure for dealing with future torrential rains. A disaster relief team from the United States headed up by New Mexico state Senator Joseph Carraro arrived with a medical team and supplies to assess the damage and help those who were displaced. Contact was made with Los Alamos Laboratory in New Mexico to determine if any radioactivity was included in the debris field. Water purification and sleeping units were provided.

The disaster clean-up soon became politicized. Chávez initially accepted assistance from anyone who offered, with the United States sending helicopters and dozens of soldiers that arrived two days after the disaster. When defense minister Raúl Salazar accepted the United States offer of further aid that included 450 Marines and naval engineers aboard the USS Tortuga, which was setting sail to Venezuela, Chávez told Salazar to decline the offer since "[i]t was a matter of sovereignty". Salazar became angry and assumed that Chávez's opinion was influenced by talks with Fidel Castro, though he complied with Chávez's order.

As part of its medical internationalism, Cuba provided medical support after the landslides. Cuba sent a 450-member medical brigade, which remained in Venezuela after the conclusion of the emergency. This experience contributed to Chávez's view that Cuba would be an important partner in the Chávez administration's foreign policy.

Despite initial dispersals of emergency funds, receiving tens of millions of dollars from international organizations and the announcement of reconstruction plans, little came of the process and Chávez grew distracted with political squabbles, abandoning attention on the tragedy with recovery ultimately halting. Survivors eventually left their refugee areas and returned to their homes in an attempt to rebuild. By 2006, the state was back to its pre-disaster population level, and projects were slowly being carried out to rebuild damaged infrastructure. Over a decade after the tragedy, thousands remained homeless and the value of real estate in zones untouched by the floods declined by as much as 70%, due to the destruction of infrastructure.

Orion, a dog, was officially recognized for his role in rescuing people during the tragedy. A mudslide forced Orion and his owner Mauricio Pérez to leave their home and go to a safer place. They came across a young girl trapped by turbulent water. Orion guided the girl to shore by swimming at her side, then jumped back in to pull a second girl out of the water. He then helped eight children climb to high places. He spent Wednesday night and part of Thursday morning saving 37 people from drowning. He was awarded a medal of valour and a certificate for the role he played.

Three films were made about the tragedy by Venezuelan filmmakers, all released in 2011. That people were still sharing these narratives is said to show the lasting impact of the tragedy, especially in a nation with a poor cinema industry.

== See also ==
- Armero tragedy – A similarly catastrophic debris flow event caused by a volcanic eruption in Colombia in 1985
- 2026 Venezuela earthquakes – A doublet earthquake that caused similar devastation in La Guaira
