= José Santiago (1950s pitcher) =

Puerto Rican baseball player (1928–2018)

- Pitcher
- Born: September 4, 1928; Coamo, Puerto Rico
- Died: October 9, 2018 (aged 90); Rio Piedras, Puerto Rico
- Batted: Right Threw: Right

Professional debut
- NgL: 1947, for the New York Cubans
- MLB: April 17, 1954, for the Cleveland Indians

Last MLB appearance
- July 15, 1956, for the Kansas City Athletics

MLB statistics
- Win–loss record: 3–2
- Earned run average: 4.66
- Strikeouts: 29
- Stats at Baseball Reference

Teams
- Negro leagues: New York Cubans (1947–1948); Major League Baseball: Cleveland Indians (1954–1955); Kansas City Athletics (1956)

Member of the Caribbean

Baseball Hall of Fame
- Induction: 2003

José Guillermo Santiago Guzmán (September 4, 1928 – October 9, 2018), better known by the nickname "Pantalones", was a Puerto Rican professional baseball pitcher who played in Major League Baseball between 1954 and 1956 for the Cleveland Indians (1954–1955) and Kansas City Athletics (1956). In the Negro leagues, he played for the New York Cubans from 1947 to 1948.

== Playing career ==
Born in Coamo, he was listed at 5 feet 10 inches (1.78 m) tall and 175 pounds (79 kg), he batted and threw right-handed. During his three MLB trials, Santiago posted a 3–2 record with 29 strikeouts and a 4.66 ERA in 27 appearances, including five starts and 56 innings of work, allowing 67 hits and 33 bases on balls. His entire pro career encompassed 13 years, 1947–1959, with two years in the Negro leagues and 11 in minor league baseball.

In 2003, Santiago was inducted into the Caribbean Baseball Hall of Fame.

== After baseball ==
In the 1970s, Santiago became a boxing promoter in Puerto Rico. A believer in Puerto Rican Independence, Santiago, like his friend Fufi Santori, owned a technically possible, Puerto Rican passport, in his case numbered #001261, since 1997.

== See also ==
- List of Negro league baseball players who played in Major League Baseball
- 1957 Caribbean Series
- Players from Puerto Rico in Major League Baseball
