= Carmen de Uria =

Former Venezuelan settlement

Coordinates: 10°36′42″N 66°46′54″W

- Former settlement
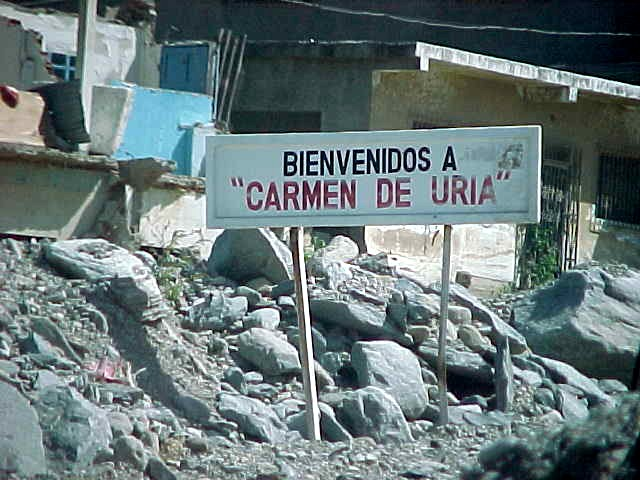
- Remains of the settlement
- Interactive map of Carmen de Uria
- Country: Venezuela
- State: La Guaira

Carmen de Uria is a former locality in La Guaira State, Venezuela. The settlement is now almost completely abandoned after its infrastructure was destroyed and sealed off during the Vargas tragedy of 1999. The area has since been declared the Carmen de Uria Memorial Recreational Park.

== History ==
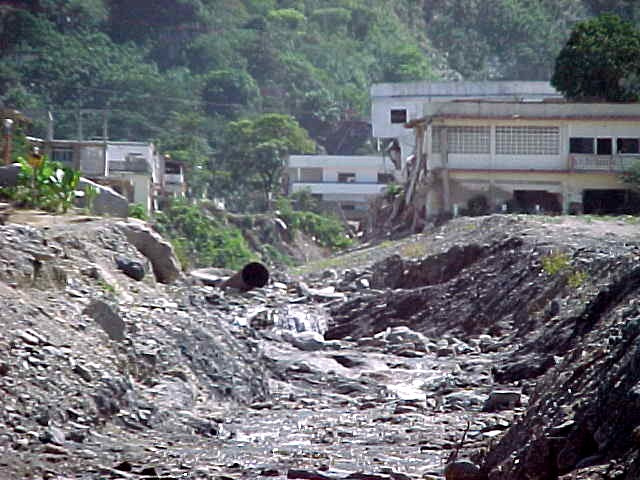
Carmen de Uria

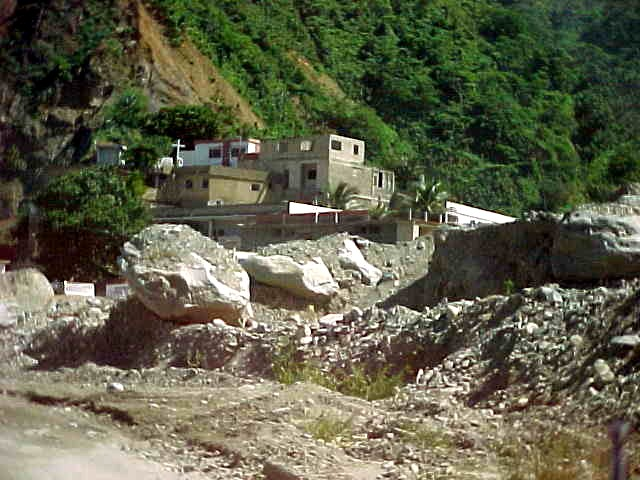
The church of Uria partially destroyed by flooding in December 1999

Carmen de Uria was a small hamlet located near Macuto, along a narrow valley of the Coastal Range, with an outlet to the Caribbean Sea and close to the city of Caraballeda. It was administratively linked to the parish of Naiguatá and connected by road to Playa Los Caracas via the Tanaguarena–Los Caracas highway.

The land was acquired by Italian businessman Filippo Gagliardi, who proposed to then-president Marcos Pérez Jiménez the development of the village as a "little Venice". Following the 1958 Venezuelan coup d'état that overthrew Pérez Jiménez, the project was halted. Gagliardi managed to complete only a main building with gardens and two swimming pools before returning to Italy.

The settlement’s economy was based primarily on tourism, services, and residential use. Electrical power reached the community in 1958.

== Destruction ==
On 15 December 1999, Carmen de Uria was severely damaged by the catastrophic floods and landslides that affected much of Venezuela’s central coast during the Vargas tragedy. Most of its infrastructure was destroyed and later sealed off by authorities.

As of the early 21st century, approximately 27 families continue to live in the area, mainly near the coastline and along the Caraballeda–Naiguatá road, as well as on Cerro Zapatero.

== See also ==
- Vargas tragedy
