= Mike Fornieles =

Cuban baseball player (1932–1998)

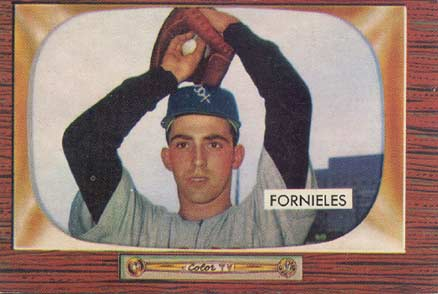
- Pitcher
- Born: January 18, 1932; Havana, Cuba
- Died: February 11, 1998 (aged 66); St. Petersburg, Florida, U.S.
- Batted: Right Threw: Right

MLB debut
- September 2, 1952, for the Washington Senators

Last MLB appearance
- July 14, 1963, for the Minnesota Twins

MLB statistics
- Win–loss record: 63–64
- Earned run average: 3.96
- Strikeouts: 576
- Saves: 55
- Stats at Baseball Reference

Teams
- Washington Senators (1952); Chicago White Sox (1953–1956); Baltimore Orioles (1956–1957); Boston Red Sox (1957–1963); Minnesota Twins (1963)

Career highlights and awards
- All-Star (1961)

José Miguel Fornieles y Torres (January 18, 1932 – February 11, 1998) was a Major League Baseball pitcher from Havana, Cuba. The right-hander pitched a one hitter in his major league debut on September 2, 1952.

== Washington Senators ==
Fornieles signed with the Washington Senators at eighteen years old, and went 17-6 with a 2.86 earned run average for the Big Spring Broncs of the Longhorn League in his first professional season. In 1952, Fornieles went 14-12 with a 2.66 ERA for his hometown Havana Cubans, and received a call up to the Senators that September. In the second game of a September 2 double header with the Philadelphia Athletics, the only hit Fornieles allowed was a second inning single by Joe Astroth. He also allowed six walks, but did not allow a single base runner from the sixth inning on.

On September 19, Fornieles was called upon by manager Bucky Harris to relieve Julio Moreno in the second inning against the Boston Red Sox. Already trailing 3-0, Fornieles held the Bosox scoreless on three hits for the remainder of the game. He also scored one of the five runs his Senators scored on their way to a come from behind victory.

He ended the season at 2-2 with a 1.37 ERA. With the Senators in need of left-handed pitching, he was dealt to the Chicago White Sox at the Winter meetings for Chuck Stobbs.

== Chicago White Sox ==
Fornieles went 8-7 with a 3.59 ERA in 1953, splitting his time between the bullpen and making spot starts. After getting off to a decent start to the 1954 season, Fornieles began to sputter. His 8.68 ERA in the month of June led manager Paul Richards to lose faith in him. After sitting on the bench unused for two weeks, he was optioned to the Charleston Senators of the American Association in mid-July. He returned to the White Sox in September, but made just one appearance. After also splitting the 1955 season between the White Sox and minor leagues, Fornieles was traded at the start of the 1956 season with George Kell, Connie Johnson and Bob Nieman to the Baltimore Orioles for Jim Wilson and Dave Philley.

== Baltimore Orioles ==
Paul Richards, now managing the Orioles used Fornieles much more regularly in Baltimore. In a little over a year with the club, Fornieles pitched 168 innings in 45 appearances. On June 14, 1957, he was traded to the Boston Red Sox for infielder Billy Goodman.

== Boston Red Sox ==
Between his two clubs, Fornieles pitched a career high 182.1 innings in 1957. After being used as both a starter and reliever his first two seasons in Boston, Fornieles became strictly a reliever in 1959, and soon emerged as one of the top relief pitchers in the American League. He pitched 82 innings, all out of the bullpen in 1959, and went 5-3 with eleven saves (4 less than league leader Turk Lown).

In 1960, he went 10-5 with a 2.64 ERA, and tied the Cleveland Indians' Johnny Klippstein for the league lead with fourteen saves. Fornieles also had an AL best 48 games finished, and set a major league record with seventy appearances out of the bullpen. He was the first ever recipient of the Sporting News AL Fireman of the Year Award.

Fornieles' eight saves at the 1961 All-Star break earned him a selection to Paul Richards' AL squad. He appeared in the eighth inning of the game, and surrendered a home run to the first batter he faced, the Chicago Cubs' George Altman. After retiring Willie Mays on a flyball to center, he gave up a single to Frank Robinson before being lifted in favor of Hoyt Wilhelm. A second All-Star game was held on July 31, however, Fornieles was not included on that team. Fornieles ended the season with a career high fifteen saves. He also brought his ERA down to 4.68.

He earned only five saves in 1962, as rookie Dick Radatz replaced him in the closer's role with an AL best 24 saves. Used as a starter in a June 20 doubleheader with the Cleveland Indians, Fornieles tied a modern major league record by hitting four Cleveland batters with pitches. On June 14, 1963, Fornieles' contract was sold to the Minnesota Twins in order to make room on the major league roster for pitching prospect Bob Heffner.

== Retirement ==
Fornieles went 1-1 with a 4.76 ERA for the Twins before being released on July 22, 1963. He signed with the Cincinnati Reds in February 1964, but failed to make the club out of Spring training. He died in St. Petersburg, Florida at the age of 66.

== Career stats ==
W	L	Pct	ERA	G	GS	CG	SHO	SV	GF	IP	ER	R	BAA	H	HR	BB	K	WP	HBP	WHIP	Fld%	Avg.
63	64	.496	3.96	432	76	20	4	55	195	1156.2	509	567	.263	1165	98	421	567	34	32	1.37	.950	.169

Fornieles' only career home run came on September 8, 1961 against the Detroit Tigers' Paul Foytack.

== Caribbean career ==
In between, Fornieles played winter ball with the Tigres de Marianao club of the Cuban Professional Baseball League in a span of eight seasons from 1952-53 – 1960-61.

In the 1952–1953 season, Fornieles posted a 12-5 record for Marianao while leading the Cuban League pitchers with a 2.33 ERA. He pitched 155 innings in 29 games, and earned the league's Rookie of the Year honors.

During the 1956-1957 season, Fornieles went 11-7 with a 2.47 ERA in 29 pitching appearances, allowing only 115 hits in 142 innings of work. With a one-two punch in the rotation of Jim Bunning and Fornieles, Marianao defeated the defending champion Elefantes de Cienfuegos and their ace Camilo Pascual to win the title and represent Cuba in the 1957 Caribbean Series.

In Game 4 of the Series on February 10, Fornieles hurled a three-hit, complete game 7–1 victory against the Leones del Caracas of Venezuela. After two days of rest, he started Game 10 on February 13, also against Venezuela. He did not record a decision, as Cuba scored three runs in the bottom of the ninth inning to win 5–4, and the Series title. Overall, Fornieles finished with a 1-0 record, a 2.81 ERA and 13 strikeouts in 16 innings.

Fornieles returned to Cuba in the winter of 1957-1958 to play for Marianao. In a very solid effort, he went 11-6 with a 2.09 ERA and 90 strikeouts in 155 innings. Once more, the Tigres captured the Cuban League title and advanced to the 1958 Caribbean Series. Fornieles started the Opening Game of the Series on February 8, and he led his team to a 10–2 victory over the Industriales de Valencia of Venezuela. On February 11, again with two days of rest, Fornieles faced Venezuela in Game 7. But he struggled this time and Venezuela scored eight runs in the first two innings en route to an 8–1 victory. Nevertheless, Cuba won the Series with a 4–2 record to become the first team to win its third straight championship (fifth overall) in Caribbean Series history. Overall, Fornieles had a record of 2-1 with a 3.08 ERA in his four series appearances, all against Venezuela.
Cuban Baseball League statistics

Some statistics are incomplete because there are no records available at the time of the request.

Seasons	W	L	W-L%	ERA	GP	CG	SHO	IP	SO	BB	Ref
8	70	63	.526	.293	231	49	2	1,146	606	366	

== See also ==
- List of Major League Baseball annual saves leaders
