= Solly Drake =

American baseball player (1930–2021)

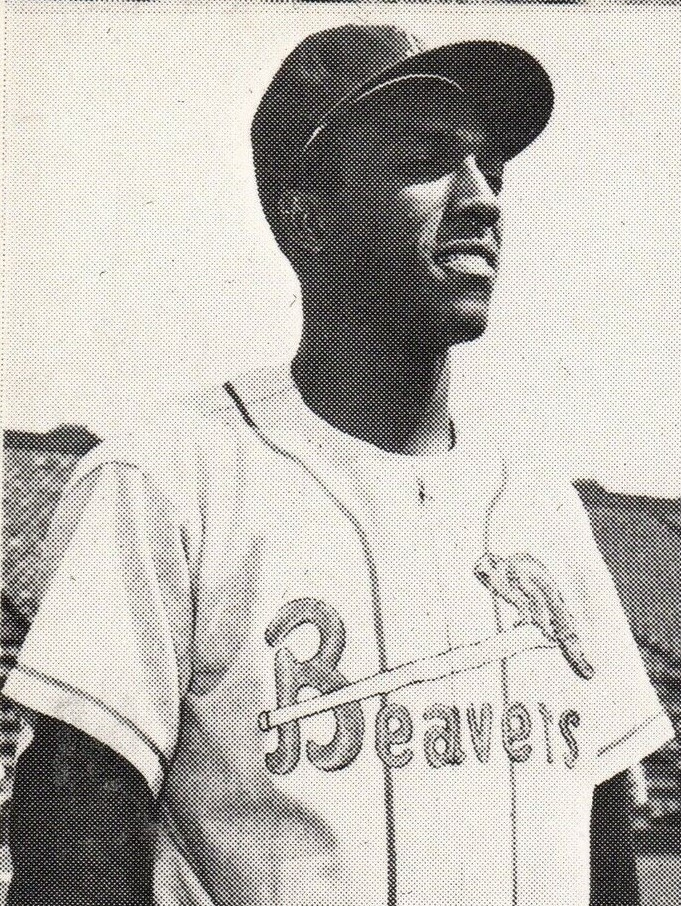
- Outfielder
- Born: October 23, 1930; Little Rock, Arkansas, U.S.
- Died: August 18, 2021 (aged 90); Los Angeles, California, U.S.
- Batted: Switch Threw: Right

MLB debut
- April 17, 1956, for the Chicago Cubs

Last MLB appearance
- September 27, 1959, for the Philadelphia Phillies

MLB statistics
- Batting average: .232
- Home runs: 2
- Runs scored: 41
- Stats at Baseball Reference

Teams
- Chicago Cubs (1956); Los Angeles Dodgers (1959); Philadelphia Phillies (1959)

Solomon Louis Drake (October 23, 1930 – August 18, 2021) was an American professional baseball outfielder who played in Major League Baseball (MLB) with the Chicago Cubs, Los Angeles Dodgers, and Philadelphia Phillies during the 1956 and 1959 baseball seasons, totaling 141 games played. Drake and his brother, Sammy, were the first African-American siblings to play in the big leagues.

Solly Drake was a switch hitter who threw right-handed, and was listed as 6 feet (1.8 m) tall, weighing 170 pounds (77 kg).

== Early life and career ==
Born in Little Rock, Arkansas, he graduated from Dunbar High School. Later that year, Drake began his baseball career when he joined the Elmwood Giants of the Mandak League as a 17-year-old outfielder; he returned for two more seasons, in Manitoba. A .300 hitter with Elmwood in 1950, Drake was signed before the 1951 season by the Chicago Cubs, as an amateur free agent. He spent that year with the Class C Topeka Owls, a minor league Cubs affiliate.

The Korean War interrupted his career for two years with Drake spending 1951 through 1953, in the U.S. Army. Following his military service, he completed his Bachelor of Arts degree in psychology and physical education, at Philander Smith College, and returned to minor league baseball in time for the 1954 season, with the Class A Des Moines Bruins.

== Major league career ==
In April 1956, at the age of 25, Drake made his major league debut, with the Cubs. That same year, he also played with the Portland Beavers, Montreal Royals, and the Triple-A (AAA) St. Paul Saints. During the off-season, Drake played winter league in Cuba, from 1957–1959. He was named the 1957 Caribbean Series MVP, after leading Cuba's Tigres de Marianao to the championship. In 1958, Drake led the International League in several offensive categories, earning him a return to the National League (NL), playing with both the Los Angeles Dodgers and Philadelphia Phillies, in 1959. He announced his retirement from professional baseball, following the 1961 season.

Drake's younger brother, Sammy Drake, was also a professional player, who spent two MLB seasons with the Cubs and New York Mets. The National Baseball Hall of Fame and Museum states that the Drake brothers, Solly and Sammy, were the first African-American siblings to play in the majors in the 20th century.

== Death ==
Drake died on August 18, 2021. He was 90 years old. He was interred at Inglewood Park Cemetery.
