= Pete Wojey =

American baseball player (1919–1990)

- Pitcher
- Born: December 1, 1919; Stowe, Pennsylvania, U.S.
- Died: April 23, 1990 (aged 70); Mobile, Alabama, U.S.
- Batted: Right Threw: Right

MLB debut
- July 2, 1954, for the Brooklyn Dodgers

Last MLB appearance
- April 25, 1957, for the Detroit Tigers

MLB statistics
- Win–loss record: 1–1
- Earned run average: 3.00
- Strikeouts: 22
- Stats at Baseball Reference

Teams
- Brooklyn Dodgers (1954); Detroit Tigers (1956–1957)

Peter Paul Wojey (December 1, 1919 – April 23, 1990) was an American professional baseball pitcher whose career extended for fifteen seasons over a twenty-year span. It included eighteen games pitched over parts of three years in Major League Baseball for the Brooklyn Dodgers (1954) and Detroit Tigers (1956–1957).

He threw and batted right-handed, stood 5 feet 11 inches (1.80 m) tall and weighed 185 pounds (84 kg).

== Biography ==
Born in Stowe, Pennsylvania December 1, 1919, Wojey began his pro career in 1941 at the age of twenty-one. Starting out in the Class D Florida East Coast League, he briefly left baseball between 1942 and 1946, but then returned to the professional game. In 1948, he was acquired by the Dodger organization and spent 61/2 years at the Double-A level, 41/2 of them with the Mobile Bears of the Southern Association.

When he was recalled from Mobile by Brooklyn in July 1954, he made his first MLB appearance on July 2 at 34 years, 213 days old. His debut would be his only starting pitcher assignment in the majors. Facing the Philadelphia Phillies at Connie Mack Stadium, he hurled four hitless innings, allowing only an unearned run. By the bottom of the fifth inning, the Dodgers had built a 4–1 lead, but Wojey ran into trouble, surrendering four hits and three runs and recording only one out. The Phillies would win the game, 7–6, with relief pitcher Clem Labine tagged with the loss.

Wojey would work in seventeen more MLB games, all in relief, for the Dodgers and Tigers. He earned his only big-league victory on August 2, 1954, against the Milwaukee Braves by throwing a scoreless 13th inning (stranding Hank Aaron on third base after Aaron led off the Braves' half with a triple), and his only save 27 days later, preserving a 12–4 triumph for Labine, also against the Braves.

Wojey's two brief stints with the Tigers took place in the early weeks of the 1956 and 1957 seasons, at a time when MLB teams could carry three extra players on their rosters for each campaign's first thirty days.

Overall, Wojey posted a 1–1 won–lost record and one save, all as a member of the Dodgers, with a career earned run average of 3.00. In thirty-three innings pitched, he gave up twenty-seven hits and fifteen bases on balls, recording twenty-two strikeouts.

He continued his minor league baseball career through 1960, working in 444 games in the minors.

== Death ==
Wojey died in Mobile, Alabama on April 23, 1990. He was seventy years old.
