= Casey Wise =

American baseball player (1932–2007)

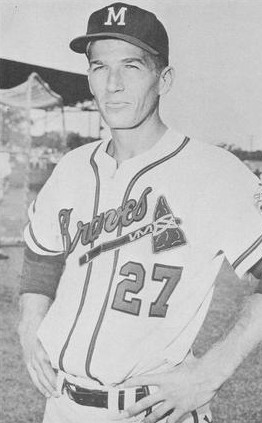
- Second baseman
- Born: September 8, 1932; West Lafayette, Indiana, U.S.
- Died: February 20, 2007 (aged 74); Naples, Florida, U.S.
- Batted: Switch Threw: Right

MLB debut
- April 16, 1957, for the Chicago Cubs

Last MLB appearance
- July 3, 1960, for the Detroit Tigers

MLB statistics
- Batting average: .174
- Home runs: 3
- Runs batted in: 17
- Stats at Baseball Reference

Teams
- Chicago Cubs (1957); Milwaukee Braves (1958–1959); Detroit Tigers (1960)

Kendall Cole "Casey" Wise (September 8, 1932 – February 20, 2007) was an American professional baseball player. He played parts of four seasons in Major League Baseball (MLB), between 1957 and 1960, with the Chicago Cubs, Milwaukee Braves and Detroit Tigers. He was primarily a second baseman, but also played substantially at shortstop. The son of longtime MLB scout Hughie Wise, Casey Wise was born in West Lafayette, Indiana. His nickname was derived from his initials, K.C.

Wise's career batting average was well below the Mendoza Line, at .174 in his 126 games, a fact pointed out by Brendan C. Boyd and Fred C. Harris in their impish commentary in The Great American Baseball Card Flipping, Trading and Bubble Gum Book (p. 59): "His may not be the worst Major League hitting record of all time, but it's definitely in contention." He spent ten seasons in the minor leagues, winning a Pacific Coast League title with the Los Angeles Angels (PCL) in 1956.

Wise also briefly managed in the minors, taking over the Triple-A Jacksonville Suns after the sudden death of Ben Geraghty on June 18, 1963, and guiding them for the remainder of the season. Tommy John, who played for him in Jacksonville, recalled that "Casey was a player's manager, an easygoing fellow who had good rapport with the kids." However, John feared that Wise was somewhat ineffective as a manager because he was too nice. The veteran players in particular had trouble respecting their young manager. During a game in which the Suns were getting blown out, Wise attempted to send Ed Donnelly into the game as a relief pitcher. Donnelly refused, and Wise told him he was through with the ballclub. The two yelled at each other in the dugout. Then, after the game, Donnelly started a fistfight with Wise. It was Donnelly's last game as a Sun. Wise never managed again after that season.

Wise attended the University of Florida in Gainesville, Florida, and graduated with a bachelor's degree in mechanical engineering in 1956.

After his professional baseball career, Wise earned degrees in dentistry and orthodontics from the University of Tennessee and became the first orthodontist in Naples, Florida, starting his practice in 1968. He retired from practice in 1991. Wise died of complications from heart surgery in Naples in 2007; he was 74 years old.

== See also ==
- List of Florida Gators baseball players
