= Hits allowed =

Total number of hits allowed by a baseball pitcher

In Baseball statistics, hits allowed (HA) signifies the total number of hits allowed by a pitcher.

== Definition ==
A hit occurs when a batter strikes the baseball into fair territory and reaches base without doing so via an error or a fielder's choice.

== Type of Hits ==
There are four types of hits in baseball: singles, doubles, triples, and home runs. All are counted equally in the hits allowed statistic.

== Calculation ==
Hits allowed is a cumulative statistic, simply tallying the total number of hits a pitcher gives up over the course of a game, season, or career.

== Related Statistics ==
- Hits Per Nine Innings (H/9): This stat represents the average number of hits a pitcher allows per nine innings pitched. It's calculated by dividing hits allowed by innings pitched and multiplying by nine.
- WHIP (Walks and Hits per Inning Pitched): Hits allowed is a component of this popular pitching statistic.

== Significance ==
Hits allowed is a fundamental measure of a pitcher's effectiveness, as allowing fewer hits generally correlates with preventing runs.

== Context ==
While hits allowed is important, it should be considered alongside other statistics like strikeouts, walks, and innings pitched for a more comprehensive evaluation of a pitcher's performance.

== See also ==
- Baseball statistics
