= Bob Speake =

American baseball player (1930–2024)

- Outfielder / First baseman
- Born: August 22, 1930; Springfield, Missouri, U.S.
- Died: October 3, 2024 (aged 94); Topeka, Kansas, U.S.
- Batted: Left Threw: Left

MLB debut
- April 16, 1955, for the Chicago Cubs

Last MLB appearance
- June 8, 1959, for the San Francisco Giants

MLB statistics
- Batting average: .223
- Home runs: 31
- Runs batted in: 104
- Stats at Baseball Reference

Teams
- Chicago Cubs (1955, 1957); San Francisco Giants (1958–1959)

Robert Charles Speake (August 22, 1930 – October 3, 2024), nicknamed Spook, was an American professional baseball player. He was an outfielder for the Chicago Cubs and San Francisco Giants of Major League Baseball in the 1950s. Speake died in Topeka, Kansas, on October 3, 2024, at the age of 94.
