= Bob Wilson (baseball) =

American baseball player (1925–1985)

- Outfielder
- Born: February 22, 1925; Dallas, Texas, U.S.
- Died: April 23, 1985 (aged 60); Dallas, Texas, U.S.
- Batted: Right Threw: Right

Professional debut
- NgL: 1947, for the Newark Eagles
- MLB: May 17, 1958, for the Los Angeles Dodgers

Last MLB appearance
- May 18, 1958, for the Los Angeles Dodgers

MLB statistics
- At bats: 5
- Hits: 1
- Batting average: .200
- Stats at Baseball Reference

Teams
- Negro leagues: Newark/Houston Eagles (1947–1949); Major League Baseball: Los Angeles Dodgers (1958)

Career highlights and awards
- NgL All-Star (1949)

Robert Wilson (February 22, 1925 – April 23, 1985) was an American professional baseball player who played in three games over two consecutive days in Major League Baseball for the 1958 Los Angeles Dodgers, two as a pinch hitter and one as a right fielder. Wilson was born in Dallas, Texas; he threw and batted right-handed, stood 5 feet 11 inches (1.80 m) tall and weighed 197 pounds (89 kg).

Wilson was 33 years old when he received his audition with Los Angeles. He began his career with the Newark Eagles of the Negro leagues in 1947; after three seasons with the Eagles, he joined the Brooklyn Dodgers' organization in 1950, spending eight full years in their farm system.

His three MLB games in 1958 came against the St. Louis Cardinals at Busch Stadium. In his debut on Saturday, May 17, he pinch hit for Stan Williams in the eighth inning and singled off Cardinal pitcher Larry Jackson; he was then erased on a force play. In the doubleheader on Sunday, May 18, Wilson pinch hit for Clem Labine in the ninth inning of the first game and struck out against Billy Muffett. Then, in the nightcap, Wilson started in right field against Vinegar Bend Mizell and went hitless in three at bats.

Wilson played a total of eleven seasons in minor league baseball, retiring following the 1960 season. He enjoyed several productive seasons at the Triple-A level, leading the International League in hits with 199 in 1955, and being named a first-team all-star in both the American Association (1952) and International circuit (1956). He died in Dallas at age 60 on April 23, 1985.

== See also ==
- List of Negro league baseball players who played in Major League Baseball
