= Hal Bevan =

American baseball player (1930–1968)

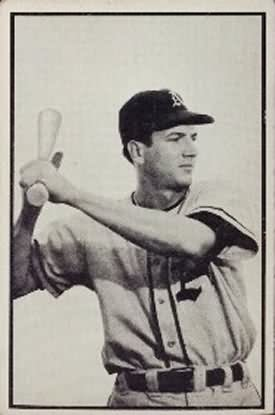
- Bevan in 1953.
- Third baseman
- Born: November 15, 1930; New Orleans, Louisiana, U.S.
- Died: October 5, 1968 (aged 37); New Orleans, Louisiana, U.S.
- Batted: Right Threw: Right

MLB debut
- April 24, 1952, for the Boston Red Sox

Last MLB appearance
- May 13, 1961, for the Cincinnati Reds

MLB statistics
- Batting average: .292
- Hits: 7
- Home runs: 1
- Stats at Baseball Reference

Teams
- Boston Red Sox (1952); Philadelphia / Kansas City Athletics (1952, 1955); Cincinnati Reds (1961)

Harold Joseph Bevan Jr. (November 15, 1930 – October 5, 1968) was an American professional baseball player.

A longtime minor league first baseman, catcher and third baseman, he was a pinch hitter and backup third baseman in Major League Baseball who had brief trials for the Boston Red Sox (1952), Philadelphia / Kansas City Athletics (1952, 1955), and Cincinnati Reds (1961). Bevan was a native of New Orleans, Louisiana, who batted and threw right-handed, stood 6 feet 2 inches (1.88 m) tall and weighed 198 pounds (90 kg). His cousin George Strickland was a Major League shortstop, coach and manager.

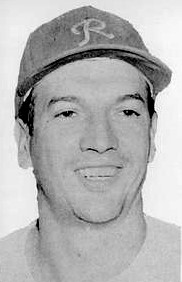
Bevan as a member of the PCL Seattle Rainiers in 1957.

Bevan's playing career was plagued by serious injuries. A broken leg curtailed his 1952 rookie season, a hand injury hampered his final MLB trial with the 1961 Reds, and he also broke his jaw and an ankle and was seriously beaned during his minor league career.

In parts of three Major League seasons, Bevan was a .292 hitter with a home run and five RBI in 15 games played. His home run, a solo shot, came as a pinch hitter off Vinegar Bend Mizell of the Pittsburgh Pirates on May 12, 1961. The following day, Bevan made his final Major League appearance, striking out as a pinch hitter against another Pirate left-hander, Joe Gibbon. He was sent to the Triple-A Jersey City Jerseys on May 18. Despite his brief term with the team, he was featured in Cincinnati relief pitcher Jim Brosnan's memoir of the Reds' 1961 season, Pennant Race. During his long minor league career (1948–51; 1953–62), Bevan compiled a batting average of .295 with 1,618 hits and 90 home runs. He led the Venezuelan Winter League with a .351 average in the 1954–55 season.

Bevan died from a kidney infection in his native New Orleans at the age of 37. At the time of his death, he was a scout for the Atlanta Braves.
