= Luis Márquez (baseball) =

Puerto Rican baseball player (1925–1988)

- Outfielder
- Born: October 28, 1925; Aguadilla, Puerto Rico
- Died: March 1, 1988 (aged 62); Aguadilla, Puerto Rico
- Batted: Right Threw: Right

Professional debut
- NgL: 1945, for the New York Black Yankees
- MLB: April 18, 1951, for the Boston Braves

Last MLB appearance
- July 11, 1954, for the Pittsburgh Pirates

MLB statistics
- Batting average: .284
- Home runs: 9
- Runs batted in: 71
- Stats at Baseball Reference

Teams
- Negro leagues: New York Black Yankees (1945); Baltimore Elite Giants (1946); Homestead Grays (1946–1948); Major League Baseball: Boston Braves (1951); Chicago Cubs (1954); Pittsburgh Pirates (1954)

Career highlights and awards
- 2x NgL All-Star (1947–1948)

Luis Ángel "Canena" Márquez Sánchez (October 28, 1925 – March 1, 1988) was a Puerto Rican professional baseball player. He was the third Puerto Rican to play in Major League Baseball (after Hiram Bithorn and Luis Olmo). Márquez played in a total of 68 games in the major leagues, split in two seasons between the Boston Braves, the Chicago Cubs and the Pittsburgh Pirates. His final game was on July 11, 1954.

== Background ==
Márquez played in the Negro leagues with the New York Black Yankees, Baltimore Elite Giants and Homestead Grays. In 1949 he became the first black player to sign with the New York Yankees. He played for 20 seasons in Puerto Rico's winter league. Márquez won the league's rookie of the year in 1944-45. Playing with Aguadilla he broke the doubles record in 1946-47. In 1948-49, Márquez recorded a local record of 108 hits. He retired second in at bats with 4,018 and an average above .300 also leading the league in hits with 1,206, doubles with 235 and runs with 768. He won the batting title in 1953-54, lead the league in hits in 1952-53 and 1953-54, also leading the league in doubles in 1946-47 and 1957-58, triples in 1945-46 and 1949-50 and home runs in 1946-47. In 1953-54, Márquez won the MVP. Playing for the Homestead Grays in 1946-48, Márquez won the Negro Leagues batting title (.417). He is credited with breaking the color barrier in the Pacific Coast League, playing for the Portland Beavers in 1949. In 1979, Márquez was inducted into the Puerto Rico Sports Hall of Fame, also entering the Puerto Rican Baseball Hall of Fame. In 1999, he was among the players included in the LBPPR's 20th century team.

In a history of Puerto Rican baseball, Thomas Van Hyning described Márquz as "a complete ballplayer who could hit, run, throw, play good defense and provide power when needed." He is the all-time leader in hits at the PRWL, with 1,206, runs (768) and doubles (235).

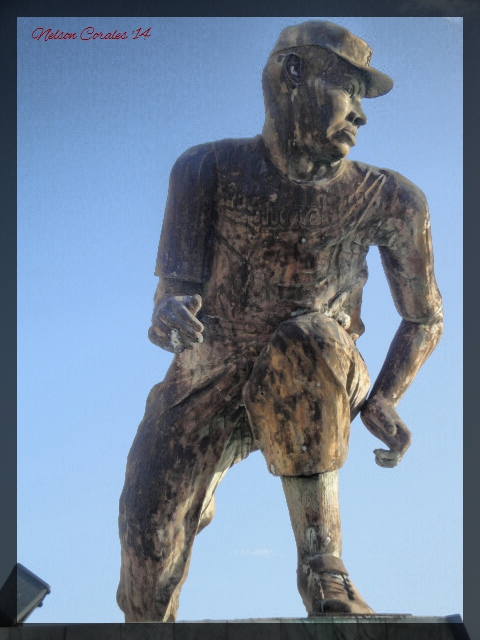
Statue at Luis A. Canena Marquez Stadium in Aguadilla

Márquez played 14 seasons in the minor leagues. He played for the Portland Beavers in the Pacific Coast League and for the Milwaukee Brewers, the Toledo Sox, and the Dallas-Fort Worth Rangers in the American Association.

Márquez was involved in baseball throughout his life as a player, coach, trainer, and Little League coach. The municipal baseball stadium in Aguadilla, Estadio Luis A. Canena Márquez, is named for him.

Márquez was murdered in Puerto Rico, as he was shot during a domestic dispute.

== See also ==
- Indios de Mayagüez
- List of Negro league baseball players who played in Major League Baseball

== Bibliography ==
- Bjarkman, Peter C. (2005). Diamonds Around the Globe: The Encyclopedia of International Baseball. Greenwood Publishing Group.
- McNeil, William F. (2012), Black Baseball Out of Season: Pay for Play Outside of the Negro Leagues, McFarland, ISBN 978-0-7864-6924-6
- Muratti Nieves, Daliana (2006). Chaguín Muratti: Un receptor del béisbol romántico puertorriqueño. Asociación de Periodistas de Puerto Rico. ISBN 1596082720.
- Riley, James A. (2002), The Biographical Encyclopedia of the Negro Baseball Leagues, New York: Carroll & Graf, ISBN 0-7867-0959-6
- Van Hyning, Thomas E. (1995), Puerto Rico's Winter League: A History of Major League Baseball's Launching Pad, Jefferson, North Carolina: McFarland & Company, ISBN 0-7864-1970-9
