= Nap Reyes =

Cuban baseball player (1919-1995)

- Third baseman / First baseman
- Born: November 24, 1919; Santiago de Cuba, Cuba
- Died: September 15, 1995 (aged 75); Miami, Florida, U.S.
- Batted: Right Threw: Right

MLB debut
- May 19, 1943, for the New York Giants

Last MLB appearance
- April 27, 1950, for the New York Giants

MLB statistics
- Batting average: .284
- Home runs: 13
- Runs batted in: 110
- Stats at Baseball Reference

Teams
- New York Giants (1943–1945, 1950)

Member of the Caribbean

Baseball Hall of Fame
- Induction: 2015
Medals
Representing Cuba
Men's baseball
Baseball World Cup
Gold medal – first place	1940 Havana	Team
Silver medal – second place	1941 Havana	Team

Napoleón Aguilera Reyes (November 24, 1919 – September 15, 1995) was a Cuban Major League Baseball third baseman and first baseman who played for the New York Giants from 1943 to 1945, and again in 1950. A native of Santiago de Cuba, Cuba, he stood 6'1" and weighed 205 lbs.

Reyes made his major league debut on May 19, 1943 against the Cincinnati Reds at the Polo Grounds. He got into 40 games as a rookie, and then played regularly in 1944 and 1945. After World War II was over, however, he got into only one more big league game. Five years later, on April 27, 1950 he played part of a game at first base and went 0-for-1.

In 1945, Reyes tied for the National League lead in the hit by pitch with eight. The two other players who were hit eight times were his teammate/manager and future Hall of Famer Mel Ott, and Chicago Cubs All-Star center fielder Andy Pafko.

Career totals include 279 games played, 264 hits, 13 home runs, 110 runs batted in, 90 runs scored, and a lifetime batting average of .284. Defensively, he fielded both of his positions very well. (.960 at third base and .991 at first base)

Reyes died at the age of 75 in Miami, Florida.
