= Bill Werle =

American baseball player (1920–2010)

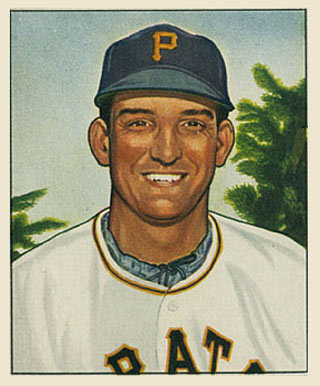
- Pitcher
- Born: December 21, 1920; Oakland, California, U.S.
- Died: November 27, 2010 (aged 89); San Mateo, California, U.S.
- Batted: Left Threw: Left

MLB debut
- April 22, 1949, for the Pittsburgh Pirates

Last MLB appearance
- June 20, 1954, for the Boston Red Sox

MLB statistics
- Win–loss record: 29–39
- Earned run average: 4.69
- Strikeouts: 283
- Stats at Baseball Reference

Teams
- Pittsburgh Pirates (1949–1952); St. Louis Cardinals (1952); Boston Red Sox (1953–1954)

William George Werle (December 21, 1920 – November 27, 2010) was an American left-handed Major League Baseball pitcher from Oakland, California. He pitched for the Pittsburgh Pirates, St. Louis Cardinals and Boston Red Sox from 1949 to 1954. His nickname was Bugs because of his interest in entomology. He threw and batted left-handed. His playing weight was 182 pounds.

== College pitcher ==
Werle pitched for Modesto Junior College in the spring of 1941. In an 8–7 loss to Compton Junior College he ceded 14 hits, but it was an unearned run which caused his defeat. He pitched a complete game. In March 1942 Werle held the University of Southern California baseball team to eight hits in a key California Intercollegiate Baseball Association contest. The University of California won 10–5. One of the hits he gave up was a solo homer to Cal Barnes in the ninth inning. Playing for the Stockton, California, All-Stars, Werle shut out the McClellan Field Commandos, 7–0, in May 1943.

== Pacific Coast League 1943–1948, 1955–1957 ==
In a benefit game for Hammond General Hospital in Modesto, California, Werle was one of three San Francisco Seals pitchers to face Sergeant Joe DiMaggio. Stationed at the Santa Ana, California, Army Air Base, Dimaggio did not reach safely in four at bats.

In February 1945 Werle was inducted into the U.S. Army. He had been employed in a Stockton war plant. He was married and had one child. Following World War II Werle again pitched for San Francisco. In a game versus the Sacramento Solons, in June 1946, he gave up 13 hits, including two home runs.

Werle pitched 16 innings against Sacramento in August 1948, winning the first game 11–0 and preserving a tie in the nightcap, 3–3. He struck out nine batters in the opener and five in the finale. The tie was not broken because of a league rule prohibiting an inning from beginning after 11:50 p.m. He won 17 and lost seven with the Seals who were managed by Lefty O'Doul.

The Portland Beavers obtained Werle from the Cincinnati Reds in early April 1955. By this time he had become a sidearm pitcher. He yielded only four hits to the Seals in an April 12 contest in San Francisco. Werle tossed a three-hitter against Sacramento on June 10, in a 6–0 Portland win. He was selected by Charlie Metro for the northern squad in the 1957 Pacific Coast League All-Star Game.

== Pittsburgh Pirates (1949–1952) ==
The Pittsburgh Pirates released catcher LeRoy Jarvis to the Seals as partial payment for the rights to Werle in January 1949. As a National League rookie Werle survived a ninth inning rally at Ebbets Field in May 1949 to beat the Dodgers, 5–3. He surrendered seven runs, three in the last inning, when Bob Ramazzoti homered. Pirates chief scout, Pie Traynor, favored Cliff Chambers over Werle, and predicted Chambers would win more games in 1949. Werle shut out the Cincinnati Reds on seven hits on July 4, 1949. It was the second game of a doubleheader and lifted the Pirates into sixth place in the National League. Werle pitched in relief for Pittsburgh in 1950. In June he came on for his second relief stint in two days. Tommy Holmes homered off of him in the eight inning, breaking a 6–6 tie and giving the Boston Braves the win. Werle outpitched All-Star Larry Jansen with a two-hitter on July 15 at Forbes Field. The Pirates beat the New York Giants 2–1. On April 17, 1951, Werle provided effective relief in a game against the St. Louis Cardinals. He retired the side without a hit in the top of the seventh after Murry Dickson walked the bases loaded. Only a single run scored when Red Schoendienst hit a sacrifice fly which plated Solly Hemus. He went 8–6 for the Pirates in 1951.

Werle was fined $500 and suspended indefinitely on April 3, 1952. Manager Billy Meyer ordered him to go back to Pittsburgh and wait for further instructions. Pittsburgh general manager, Branch Rickey, reinstated Werle on April 11, but the fine was not dropped. The incident which prompted the fine and suspension was not explained clearly. Werle understood that it had to do with his having been 30 minutes late, a violation of training rules. It was mentioned that he arrived at his hotel with roommate, George Metkovich, after seven innings of a night game in Beaumont, Texas. They had a couple of bottles of beer each, showered, and went downstairs. He denied a rumor of having a woman in his hotel room, which Rickey seemed to believe at first. Werle swore on his father's grave that this was untrue and 'that someone was a damned liar'.

== St. Louis Cardinals (1952) ==
Werle was traded to the Cardinals on May 1, 1952, for righthanded pitcher George Red Munger. In a game against the New York Giants on June 16 he relieved Eddie Yuhas in the ninth inning with two men on base. He walked Whitey Lockman before he was removed for Willard Schmidt. Schmidt gave up a grand slam to Bobby Thomson, who hit his first pitch over the left field roof just inside the foul line at the Polo Grounds, to win the game for the Giants.

== Boston Red Sox (1952–1954) ==
Werle was claimed by the Boston Red Sox off waivers from the St. Louis Cardinals on October 2, 1952. In a May 1953 game versus the New York Yankees, he relieved Mickey McDermott with only one out in the first inning. He yielded a third-inning home run to Mickey Mantle and three runs over 5 2/3 innings of work. Werle gave an up a long homer to Dave Philley in a relief outing against the Cleveland Indians in April 1954. He gave up five hits in 4 2/3 innings and three earned runs. Gus Zernial tagged Werle for a home run in the ninth inning of a game with the Philadelphia Athletics in June.

The Cincinnati Reds obtained Werle from the Louisville Colonels of the American Association on October 14, 1954. Manager Birdie Tebbetts named Werle as one of three pitchers to be used in the first game of spring training 1955. The Reds played an exhibition against the Chicago White Sox. After the Reds cut him, Tebbetts refuted a statement by Werle, saying that the pitcher was given every chance to make the club.

== Manager and scout ==
Werle was named interim manager of the Hawaii Islanders of the Pacific Coast League in August 1961. He managed the Phoenix Giants (Phoenix Firebirds) in 1966 until he served as a temporary replacement for Larry Jansen as pitching coach for the San Francisco Giants. Werle was placed on the San Francisco Giants roster at the age of 46 in September 1967. He managed Phoenix that season and was just 19 days short of becoming eligible for the major league pension plan, so the Giants put him on the active list as an extra coach. Werle served as a scout for the Baltimore Orioles in 1980.

== Death ==
On November 27, 2010, Werle died due to complications of Alzheimer's in San Mateo, California. He is interred at Skylawn Memorial Park in San Mateo, California.
