= Baseball in Puerto Rico =

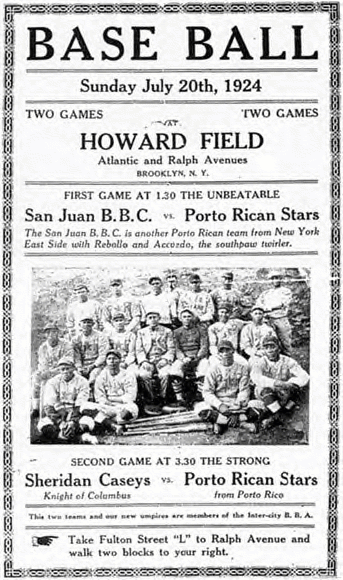

Baseball is the most popular sport in Puerto Rico. In terms of spectators and active participants, it is the premier sport on the island.

The game was introduced to the island in the late 19th century and the first two clubs were founded in 1897, before the Spanish–American War. The sport was initially ridiculed as unmanly. However, when local Puerto Rican teams began to defeat more experienced American teams, the sport caught on.

As of 2016, over 100 Major League Baseball players were active in the Puerto Rico Baseball League.

Famous baseball players from Puerto Rico include Hall of Famers Roberto Clemente, Orlando Cepeda, Roberto Alomar, Iván Rodríguez and Edgar Martinez; as well as Jose "Cheo" Cruz; Juan González; Victor Pellot; Francisco Lindor; Yadier Molina; and Bernie Williams.

== Early history ==
Baseball was introduced to the island in the late 19th Century, by a military captain named Cabán and his family. At first the sport was mocked by the farmers, tobacco workers and sugarcane cutters of the island, who considered it an effete, unmanly game.

The first two baseball clubs were founded in 1897: the Almendares Baseball Club owned by Francisco Alamo Armas, and the Borinquen Baseball Club owned by Santos Filippi. According to El País newspaper, the first organized baseball game was played on January 11, 1898, at the old velodrome in Santurce, San Juan. The Borinquen (mostly composed by locals) beat the Almendares (mostly composed by Cubans) by a score of 3 to 0. The first game to go a complete nine innings was played on January 30, 1898, when the Borinquen beat the Almendares again, by a score of 9 to 3. During this time, there was no known organization in charge of registering or sanctioning the games, with only some appearing in newspapers.

Later that same year, Puerto Rico became an American territory when the United States defeated Spain in the Spanish–American War. the influx of people from the United States combined with an increase of locals attending universities abroad, leading an increase in both the practice and the instruction of the sport. By way of recreation, the American soldiers stationed in Puerto Rico were permitted to organize a baseball club to play against the local Puerto Rican clubs. Classic teams like Almendares, joined novel teams like Habana and faced teams from San Cristóbal or El Morro (which also hosted the games). On November 4, 1900, the Almendares Baseball Club trounced the American Baseball Club of the Second Regiment of Infantry, by a score of 32 to 18.

The first formal league was organized in July 1901 and combined businesses and government agencies as components. Games were held at San Juan, in Puerta de Tierra, General Elliot's Place and in terrains near railroads. As it became more popular, new teams emerged and a makeshift park was created at Puerta de Tierra, where teams like Tesorería, Interior and Red D played. Millón and Unión were independent, Bancroft, Monengohela, Don Juan de Austria, Company I and Marines were military, High School and Lincoln were schools. At Ponce, Esparta (military) and Eléctricos (civilians) played. By 1908, it had become the most popular sport and was practiced by children. Later, a dispute over playing Sundays lead to the birth of the Porto Rico Baseball Association, which played throughout the weekend. Inter-municipal games were played with train transportation for both fans and players. On January 1, 1902, the Independientes and the Curiosities played their first game at San Juan.

On April 13, 1902, a night game was played under improvised torch lighting. The first university team was born the following year. With the onset of a new decade, Fridays became the day where school teams played, with Ponce High (Ponce) and Central High (Santurce) headlining. The School and Service League emerged to sanction these games. The municipalities of Ponce and San Juan were the dominant regions as military traffic was frequent in this route leading to the creations of amateur teams, but the sport was practiced throughout Puerto Rico. Team Ponce had Paquito Montaner among its members. The central region with a combination of tobacco plantations and a nascent military presence had Savarona in Caguas and Cayey had Plata. Chillo Ansuátegui and Santiagito Michelena in 1902, Mayagüez also swathe creation of the Pope Hartford in 1905 and other teams like Porto Rican Express, Yagüez, Pitirre and Hilton also emerged in the region. Cardenales de Mayagüez, POPE, Fisk, Army and Leones de Ponce were created during the 1910s.

Beginning in 1913, the government brought a team named All-Americans, which was a selection of American players. Three years later, the Linares Cuban Stars were brought from Cuba. With the emergence of the Negro Leagues, teams like the Brooklyn Royal Giants, Cuban Stars and Havana Stars played in the island. Other visitors included the Lincoln Giants and the Estrellas Dominicanas. The first female team in Puerto Rico was organized by professors in 1913, who defeated their male counterparts 6–5. Felipe Rodríguez and Antonio Luciano began bringing foreign teams, while Collectiva and Trolley gained local prominence. In 1916, Martín Gaudier took Team Ponce to a tour in the Dominican Republic. Two years later, the Borinquen Stars toured Venezuela.

During the 1920s, Porto Rico Sports was led by Cosme Beitía, José Torres, Pedro Faberllé and Francisco Faberllé. The amateur league was formally established and began competition. Teams from Puerto Rico, such as the San Juan Baseball Club and the Porto Rican Stars, would travel to New York City to play against some of the professional American teams. In 1925, pitcher and third baseman Agustín Daviú was the first Puerto Rican to play in the American system, competing for Allentown in Triple-A. William Guzmán y García became the first Puerto Rican to have a Major League Baseball (MLB) tryout, but ultimately choose to pursue a career in law. In 1936, the Cincinnati Reds trained in at Parque Sixto Escobar, where they faced several amateur teams including the San Juan Giants, Guayama Stars, Wrigley and the White Stars.

On October 8, 1938, president Teófilo Maldonado joined Enrique Huyke and Carlos García in founding the Semiprofessional League, featuring teams from Caguas, San Juan Ponce, Mayagüez, Humacao and the inaugural champion Guayama, which went on to win the Semiprofessional World Series over the Duncan Cementers. There was no racial segregation in the league and reinforcements of all races were brought in from other Latin American leagues, the minors and the Negro Leagues. Willard Brown and Satchel Paige were prominent among them. Gustama's shortstop Pedro Cepeda emerged as the first local superstar, batting .465 during the first year and winning two consecutive batting titles and becoming the first player to bat over .400 in two different positions following his move to first base. While Guayama won the title, Hiram Bithorn became the youngest coach in the league while managing San Juan at the age of 22. In 1939, the Liga de Futuras Estrellas de Puerto Rico was created for children, though it was interrupted by World War II.

Due to being white and speaking English, Bithorn and Olmos were able to circunvent the racial segregation prevalent in American baseball during the 1940s. However, the latter commented that he still experienced some discrimination for being Latin American. Niño Escalera was the first black player in the Cincinnati Reds. Despite the color barrier being broken, Latino and black players were still forced to eat in other rooms during the 1950s. For Puerto Ricans, this proved particularly puzzling given the absence of a color barrier in Puerto Rico, with players like Vic Power facing discrimination due to both race and origin. Consequently, they created collaboration ties between players. Roberto Clemente protested that blacks and Latinos were forced to stay in the bus while whites ate, managing to convince the Phillies to acquire a second vehicle so they could eat without delay.

In 1999, Pedro Cepeda was named the best shortstop of the 20th Century, while his son Orlando did the same at first base.

== Chronology of major events ==
- On January 11, 1898, the first organized baseball game was played in Puerto Rico between the Borinquen team and the Almendares team. The Borinquen won 3 to 0.
- On November 4, 1900, the Almendares Baseball Club defeated the U.S. Second Infantry Regiment, by a score of 32 to 18.
- In 1928, Emilio "Millito" Navarro of the Cuban Stars became the first Puerto Rican to play in the Negro leagues.
- In 1940, while pitching for the Brujos de Guayama, Satchel Paige walked off the field and left the stadium, because he saw a ghost standing next to him on the pitcher's mound.
- In 1942, Hiram Bithorn of the Chicago Cubs became the first Puerto Rican to play in the major leagues.
- In 1947, the Leones de Ponce and a selection of native All-Stars defeated the New York Yankees on consecutive games.
- In 1949, Luis Olmo (El "Jíbaro" Olmos) of the Brooklyn Dodgers became the first Puerto Rican to play in a World Series game, and the first one to hit a home run and to get three hits, in the same game.
- In 1951, Puerto Rico won its first and only Baseball World Cup.
- In 1954, Rubén Gómez of the New York Giants became the first Puerto Rican to pitch in a World Series game, and the first one to receive a World Series ring.
- In 1971, Roberto Clemente of the Pittsburgh Pirates became the first Hispanic to reach 3,000 hits, and the first Puerto Rican to be enshrined in the Baseball Hall of Fame.
- In 1984, Willie Hernández of the Detroit Tigers became the first Puerto Rican to win both the AL Cy Young Award and the AL MVP Award.
- In 1992, Jose "Cheo" Cruz was honored by the Houston Astros when his #25 was retired by the team.
- In 1995, Leon Day, a Pitcher in the Negro leagues who played for "Los Tiburones de Aguadilla" the "Aguadilla Sharks" was inducted into the Hall of Fame. His love for the island is reflected in the fact that he is the only Hall of Famer to be enshrined with a cap of a team outside the mainland United States; his plaque depicts him as an "Aguadilla Shark."
- In 1999, Orlando "Peruchin" Cepeda became the second Puerto Rican enshrined in the Baseball Hall of Fame.
- In 2001, Major League Baseball history was made when Opening Day was in San Juan at the Hiram Bithorn Stadium with a game between the Texas Rangers and the Toronto Blue Jays.
- In 2003 as well as 2004, the former Montreal Expos played 22 home games each year at Hiram Bithorn Stadium in San Juan, before moving to Washington, D.C., and becoming the Washington Nationals.
- In 2011, Roberto Alomar became the third Puerto Rican enshrined in the Baseball Hall of Fame.
- In 2013, the Puerto Rico National Baseball Team defeated two-time champions Japan during the 2013 World Baseball Classic semi-finals. They finished as the runner-up in the tournament.
- In 2017, catcher Iván Rodríguez became the fourth Puerto Rican elected to the Baseball Hall of Fame in Cooperstown.
- In 2017, the Puerto Rico National Baseball Team finished as runner-up in the 2017 World Baseball Classic.

== Liga de Béisbol Profesional Roberto Clemente ==
Puerto Rico has a winter baseball league named the Liga de Béisbol Profesional Roberto Clemente, formerly known as Liga de Béisbol Profesional de Puerto Rico (LBPPR) and Puerto Rico Baseball League, that has operated since the early 20th century. The champion of the Puerto Rico league represents Puerto Rico in the annual Caribbean World Series.

The LBPRC currently has six teams:

- Atenienses de Manatí (Manatí Athenians)
- Cangrejeros de Santurce (Santurce Crabbers)
- Criollos de Caguas (Caguas Creoles)
- Gigantes de Carolina (Carolina Giants)
- Indios de Mayagüez (Mayagüez Indians)
- Leones de Ponce (Ponce Lions)

In 2007, the LBPPR recessed for the first time since its creation. In 2008, the organization resumed operations, but with several structural changes. These included reducing the league to only four teams, renaming the league as the "Puerto Rico Baseball League", and establishing a website.

Currently, the league's champion also participates in the Caribbean Series.

In 2008, the LBPPR participated in the first inter-league series with the LBPDR, otherwise known as the Liga de Beisbol Profesional de la Republica Dominicana (Professional Baseball League of the Dominican Republic).

=== Inception and early years of the league (1938–1940) ===
Enrique Huyke, a professor from Mayagüez, originally suggested the establishment of an organized baseball league in Puerto Rico. The idea was adopted by Teofilo Maldonado, president of the Commission on Recreation and Sports. Gabriel Castro helped Huyke with the scouting of organizations, which had to pay $1,000 prior to being admitted. The Guayama Rotary Club collaborated in raising funds for the teams. The Liga de Béisbol Semiprofesional de Puerto Rico (LBSPR) was founded in 1938, as a semi-professional league. The new league consisted of six teams: the Senadores de San Juan (San Juan Senators), Leones de Ponce (Ponce Lions), Indios de Mayagüez (Mayagüez Indians), Criollos de Caguas (Caguas Creoles), Brujos de Guayama (Guayama Witch Doctors), and Grises Orientales de Humacao (Humacao Oriental Grays).

Maldonado was named the league's commissioner. The league set deadlines for changes in the rosters, which were allowed only during the first half of the season, and the number of games played has historically varied from 40 to 80 games per season. The All-Star game was scheduled to coincide with the traditional Three Kings Day, January 6, an idea suggested by Angel Colón so that the proceeds could be used to buy toys. This date was used for decades, until the emergence of television forced the league to comply with dates requested by the networks.

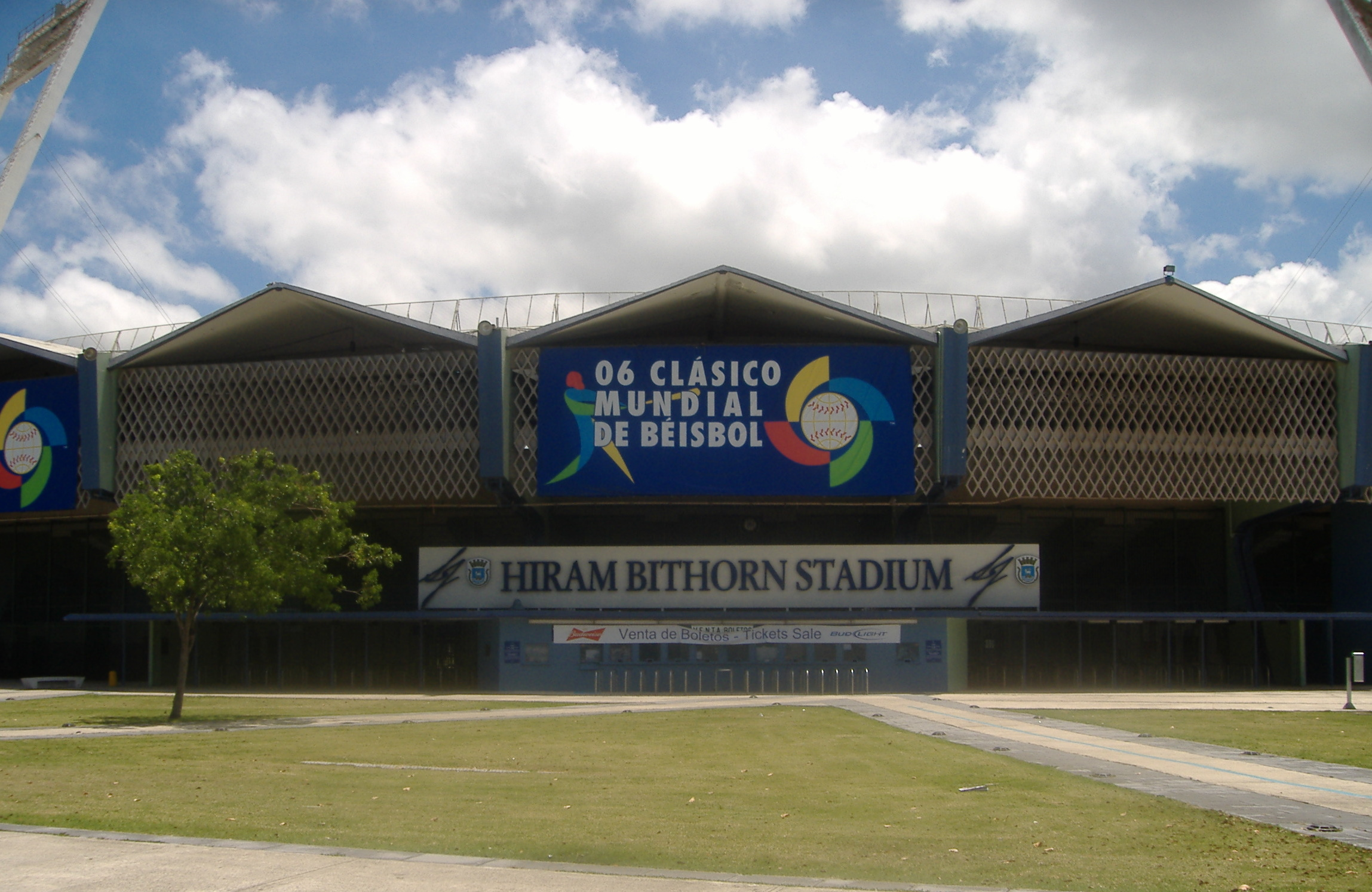
Hiram Bithorn Stadium in San Juan. It was named after the first Puerto Rican to ever play in the major leagues, Hiram Bithorn.

The first Puerto Rican players to play in U.S. Major League Baseball, Hiram Bithorn and Luis Olmo, were active in the rosters of San Juan and Caguas. Bithorn became the youngest manager in the league's history, named to the position in 1938 at the age of 22. Enrique Huyke served as manager for Mayagüez for less than a month, because the team's owner threatened to remove its entry if he did not take the office. One of the main figures of the league in its early stage was Negro leagues’ veteran, Emilio Navarro.

In the 1939–40 season, the Cangrejeros de Santurce (Santurce Crabbers) and Tiburones de Aguadilla (Aguadilla Sharks) joined the original teams. On January 8, 1939, Humacao and San Juan played an 18-inning game that lasted four hours, establishing a record.

Between 1938 and 1941, the LBSPR was part of the National Semi-Professional Baseball Congress, with titleholder Guayama facing the champions of the Congress’ United States branch in best-of-seven series in 1939, where they defeated the Duncan Cementers, and again in 1940.

In 1939–40, Perucho Cepeda won the league's batting championship over Josh Gibson, who managed to win it the following season. The Criollos de Caguas won their first championship in 1940/41, defeating the Cangrejeros in the final series. Santurce's Luis Cabrera was the last player to win the LBSPR’ Most Valuable Player award.

In October, 1940, Hall of Fame pitcher Satchel Paige arrived in Puerto Rico, four weeks after the start of the 1939/40 winter season. He joined the Brujos de Guayama (Guayama Witch Doctors), who also featured shortstop Perucho Cepeda and outfielder Tetelo Vargas. On November 5, Paige pitched a shut out against rival Santurce, which featured player-manager Josh Gibson, by a lopsided score of 23 to 0.

In a December game against Mayagüez, Paige set a league record by striking out 17 batters. He ended the season with a 19–3 record, a 1.93 ERA, and 208 strikeouts in 205 innings. The 19 wins and 208 strikeouts set single-season league records, that have never been broken. Paige helped his team win the league championship playoff series, winning two games against the San Juan Senadores. Paige went on to win the league's Most Valuable Player award in 1940. The town of Guayama is widely known for its Santería, Palo (religion), and other spiritualist religious practices. In a legendary game in Guayama, Paige walked off the mound, because he saw a ghost standing next to him.

=== Professional status ===
On September 14, 1941, Rafael Delgado Márquez proposed that the league recognize a move from semi-professional to professional status by renaming itself to Liga de Béisbol Profesional de Puerto Rico (LBPPR).

The league used a format of vueltas (halves), where the winners of each half facing each other for the championship. However, Ponce managed to win four consecutive championships (1941–45), and in three of those seasons (1941–42, 1943–44, 1944–45) they won both halves and were declared champions without participating in a final. Consequently, once the other teams were eliminated from winning the second-half title, their fans tended to lose interest. Some players also dropped out after their teams were eliminated. To deal with this issue, in 1948/49 the league established a new playoff format that included the top four teams.

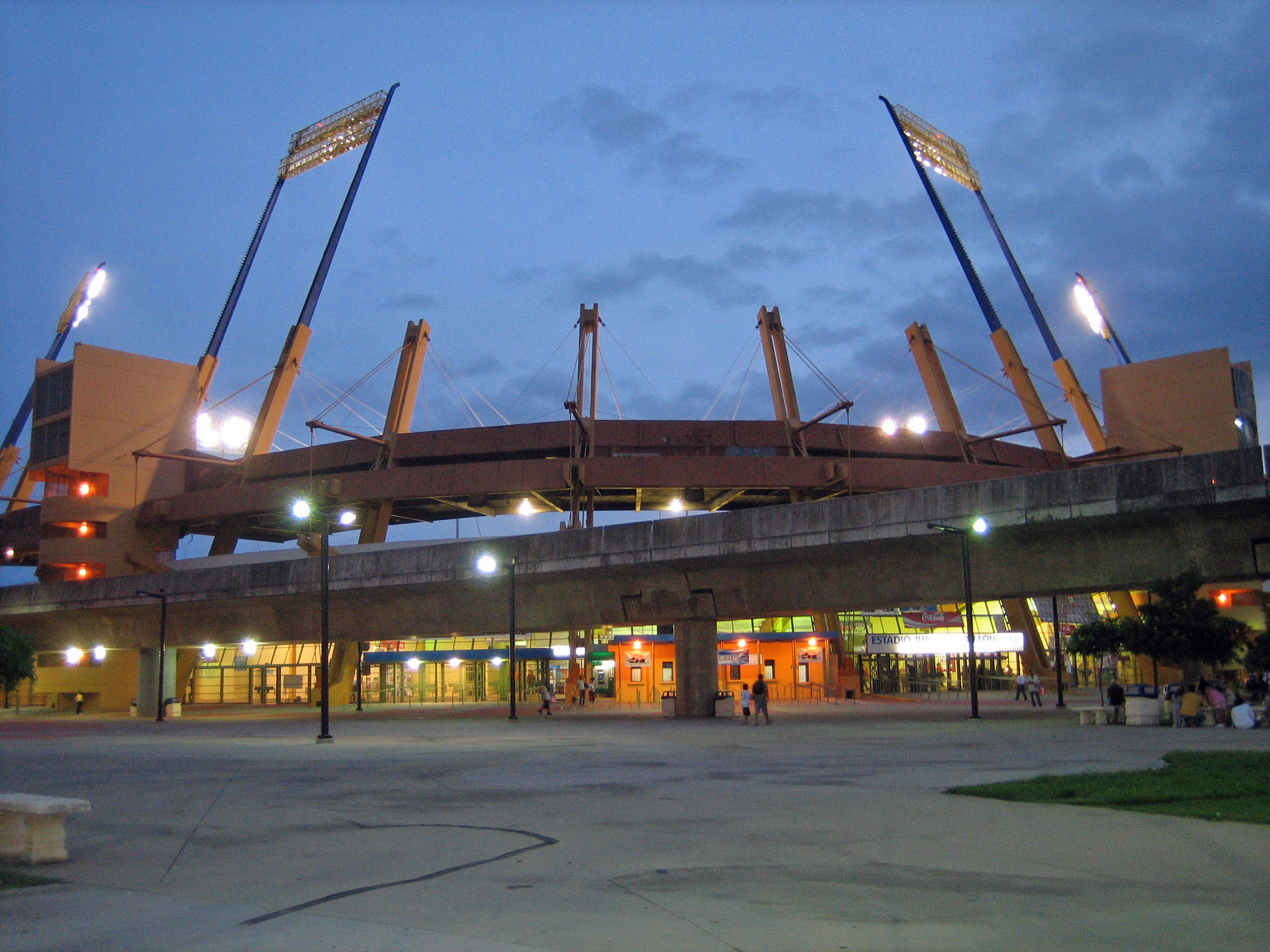
Estadio Juan Ramón Loubriel

Drafted by the Chicago Cubs in 1941, Hiram Bithorn was the first Puerto Rican to ever play major league baseball. The world took notice in 1943, when Bithorn went 18–12 with an earned run average of 2.60, and completed 19 of his 30 starts. He also led the league in shutouts (seven), setting a record for Puerto Rican pitchers that stands to this day.

Francisco Coímbre was a key member of Ponce's success, winning two batting championships and a Most Valuable Player award. He went three consecutive seasons (1939–42) without striking out. Other players that participated for Ponce included Juan Guilbe and Griffin Tirado. In 1943-44 and 1944–45, Ponce pitcher Tomás "Planchardón" Quiñones won back-to-back Most Valuable Player awards.

World War II affected the league directly, reducing the 1942–43 season's length to 36 games and the number of active teams to four. The league continued with four teams through 1945–46, but they played 48 games from 1943 to 1946. From 1942 to 1944, teams were not allowed to bring in imported players. In the 1944/45 season, Luis "Canena" Márquez debuted in the league and hit .361, setting the record for highest batting average by a rookie.

The Senadores de San Juan won their first championship in 1945–46, defeating the Indios in the finals. During this season, Joe Buzas became the first foreign MLB player to manage in the LBPPR.

Victor Pellot, also known as Vic Power, made his debut for the Criollos on the 1947–48 season, when the team won the league title. The team roster included Rafaelito Ortiz, the only pitcher to win ten or more games for three different LBPPR teams.

In 1947, the New York Yankees participated in a five-game series against teams from the Caribbean leagues. In Puerto Rico, Ponce and an All-Star LBPPR team defeated the Yankees on consecutive nights. José "Pantalones" Santiago debuted in this season, earning the Rookie of the Year recognition while Canena Marquez broke Josh Gibson's home run record of 13.

In 1948–49, the LBPPR joined the Caribbean Series, beginning a rivalry with Cuba that lasted throughout the next decade, until Cuba ceased to participate in the event.

Leon Day, a member of the U.S. Negro leagues, also played for Los Triburones de Aguadilla (the Aguadilla Sharks) in Puerto Rico. When Day was inducted into the Baseball Hall of Fame, he became the only Hall of Famer to be enshrined with a cap of a team outside the mainland U.S. – his plaque depicts him as a Tiburon de Aguadilla.

=== New stadiums built ===
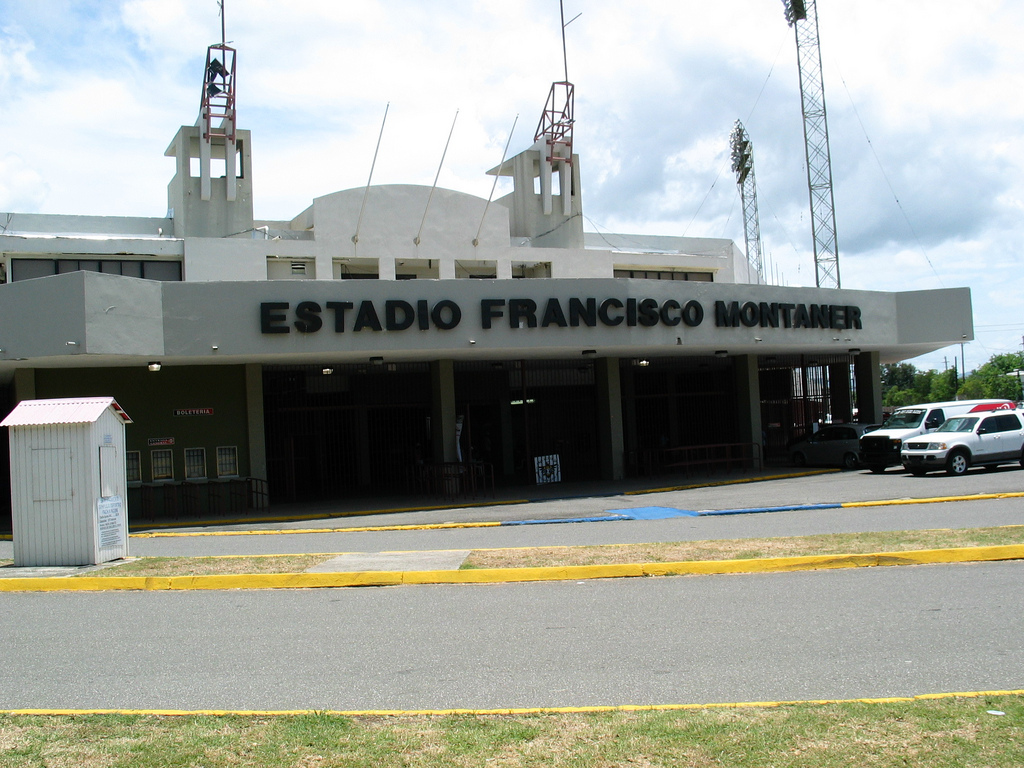
Estadio Francisco Montaner, in Ponce

A decade after its foundation the league was employing an 80-game schedule, with an average season attendance of 750,000.

Estadio Sixto Escobar was the oldest stadium, built in San Juan in 1935. It was also the largest, with 13,135 seats and a maximum capacity of over 15,000.

By the 1949–50 season, several new ballparks were built, each containing 6,000 or more seats. The largest new stadium was Ponce's Estadio Francisco Montaner with 9,718 seats. Montaner has the distinction of being the first stadium in Puerto Rico that installed an artificial surface field. The installation of lights, which allowed for night games, further boosted stadium attendances. The Stadium was named to honor Francisco "Paquito" Montaner, one of the greatest Puerto Rican pitchers of all times.

Perucho Cepeda was one of the league's dominant figures during the 1940s, winning two batting championships.

Natalio Irizarry won the league's Rookie of the Year recognition in 1949–50. From 1949 to 1955, the league featured the participation of new MLB players, including Johnny Logan, Harvey Haddix and Hank Aaron among several others.

The MLB players kept returning, and encouraged more MLB to join them, began of the calibre of league play and because of the warm climate during winter months. Players from the Negro leagues preferred it due to a lack of racism towards the players, as opposed to the United States.

=== Emergence of Clemente and Cepeda ===
In 1952, Roberto Clemente made his debut with the Cangrejeros hitting .234. He was signed by Pedrin Zorilla, debuting in the league as a teenager. The team won that year's title and Cot Deal was named MVP. Clemente improved this average to .288 the following season, but Santurce finished last in the league. The league's champions were the Criollos, who also won the Caribbean Series. With a roster that also included Luis Olmo, Willie Mays and Rubén Gómez, the Cangrejeros won the 1954–55 championship defeating Caguas in the finals, 4–1. During this season, Clemente became the first Puerto Rican player to hit two home runs in the league's All-Star game. The team also went on to win the Caribbean Series, which were held in Venezuela. Jim Rivera had an average of .450 and was named MVP. Puerto Rican fans received the team with a parade upon landing and Luis Muñoz Marín welcomed them in La Fortaleza.

In 1955–56, the Criollos won the league's championship, in a season that marked Orlando Cepeda's debut in the league. Clemente won the season's batting championship with an average of .396. In 1956–57, the league's championship was won by the Indios. During this season, Clemente went on to break the league's record for most games with hits, previously established by Francisco Coimbre in 1943–44.

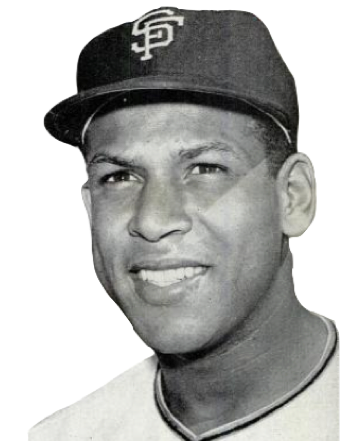
Orlando Cepeda

The following season, the Criollos defeated the Cangrejeros to win the championship. Clemente who now played for Caguas, hit .529 during the final series. Juan "Terin" Pizarro won the Most Valuable Player Award, leading the league in wins, ERA, best win-to-loss margin and pitched the LBPPR's seventh no-hitter. In the Caribbean Series, he defeated Carta Vieja of Panama (8:0), recording 17 strikeouts. Both teams traded the final two championships of the decade.

In 1958–59, Orlando Cepeda, coming from his first season in the Majors where he was selected Rookie of the Year in the National League, kept things on fire with Santurce winning the batting title and MVP award, helping the Crabbers win their fourth championship. The 1959–60 season marked the first instance that LBPPR games were transmitted in two languages through radio. The Criollos won the championship, while Mayagüez's Ramón Luis Conde won the Most Valuable Player Award.

In 1961–62, coming from his best season in the big leagues, Cepeda was also LBPPR leader in home runs and RBIs, and won his second MVP Award guiding Santurce to its fifth championship.

=== Economic and political factors ===
During the 1950s, Puerto Rico's economy grew significantly, and this encouraged baseball-related gambling. This tendency experienced a notable increase in the early 1960s. Other changes carried in the game's style, with the introduction of more player-managers such as Luis Olmo, who became the first to consistently employ pitching coaches and closers in the league.

After the Cuban Revolution, hotels and casinos in San Juan benefited from Havana’ economic decay. During this timeframe, Puerto Rico expanded its presence in the Caribbean, and a native team frequently played again a representation of St. Thomas and Saint Croix in February. Julio Navarro was drafted from one of these exhibitions, eventually becoming one of the league's dominant pitchers.

In 1961–62, due to political tension between the U.S. and Cuba, the Caribbean Series planned for in Havana's Estadio Latinoamericano (Latin American Stadium) was cancelled. The event was replaced by the Interamerican Series, which San Juan attended with a roster that included pitcher Florentino Rivera.

=== New leagues, series and stadiums ===
During the 1960s the Dominican Winter League was still not a member of the Caribbean Confederation, which allowed uncommon interleague trades between it and the LBPPR, which would have more trouble negotiating such deals with member leagues. During this decade, some of the league's teams would provide import players with houses and taxis for transportation.

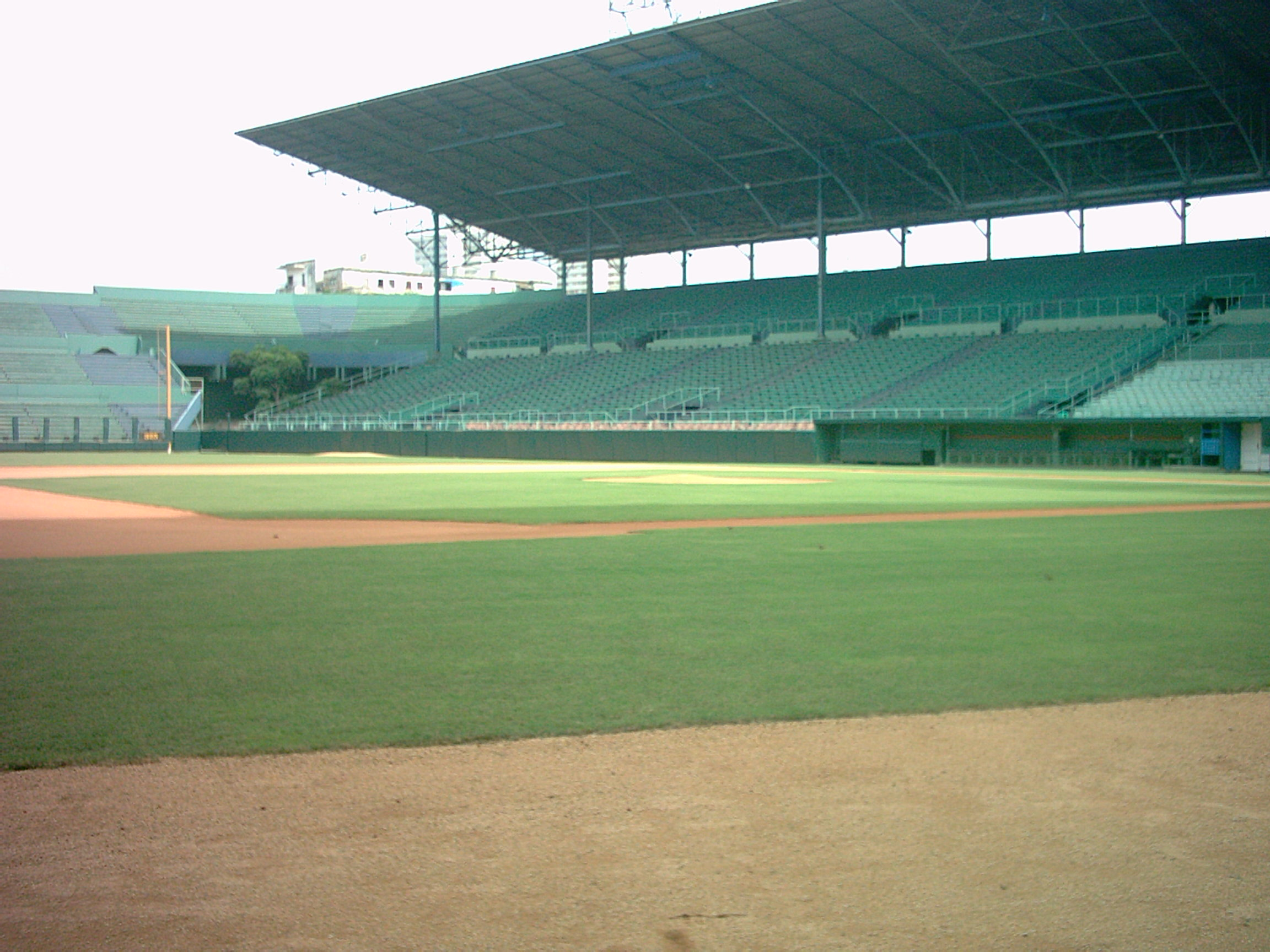
Estadio Latinoamericano in Havana, Cuba

The Senadores de San Juan, led by Clemente, who had just won the MLB World Series with Pittsburgh, won the league's 1960–61 season, as well as José Santiago, who posted a record of 10–2 with an ERA of 2.44 for the team. Luis Arroyo won the season's Most Valuable Player award, registering a record of 10–2 with an ERA of 1.64.

The Interamerican Series were held three more times, with each team winning on their home field. Mayagüez did so in 1963, in a series where Terin Pizarro recorded the only no-hitter in the history of the event, in a win over Valencia at the opening night.
In 1961–62, the Lobos de Arecibo joined the league as an expansion team. On January 14, 1962, Julio Navarro pitched the first regular season no-hitter.

For the 1962–63 season, Estadio Sixto Escobar was replaced by the Hiram Bithorn Stadium, with a larger capacity of 20,000 seats. The field dimensions were set to match the Olympic Stadium of the Montreal Expos: 325 feet (99 m) down the left field line, 325 feet (99 m) down the right field line and 404 feet (123 m) to center field. The outfield fences were set 8 feet (2.4 m) high.

In 1963–64, Clemente finished second with a batting average of .345, leading the Senadores to the title. San Juan once again played in the Interamerican Series, held in Nicaragua. In 1964–65, Orlando Cepeda joined the Cangrejeros, replacing Jim Beauchamp and helping the team win the league championship. During this season, Clemente was named San Juan's player-manager, leading them to the playoffs.

The following season featured the debut of Jerry Morales, who won the league's Rookie of the Year award. Carlos Bernier retired in 1966, having won five stolen base titles for a total of 285 stolen bases. On November 20, 1966, San Juan's Luis de Leon pitched the first perfect game in the league's history.

Caguas won the league championship in 1967–68. Nino Escalera, who finished his career third on the league's hit list, replaced Vic Power as the team's manager during this season. On December 20, 1969, Santurce and Arecibo participated in the only LBPPR game played outside of Puerto Rico, held in the United States Virgin Islands to honor Elrod Hendricks.

== Re-emergence in the Caribbean Series ==
Ponce won the second of back-to-back championships in 1969–70 as well as the Caribbean Series’ title being led in both by Conde's offensive. The Cangrejeros won the 1970–71 championship, defeating the Criollos in the finals.

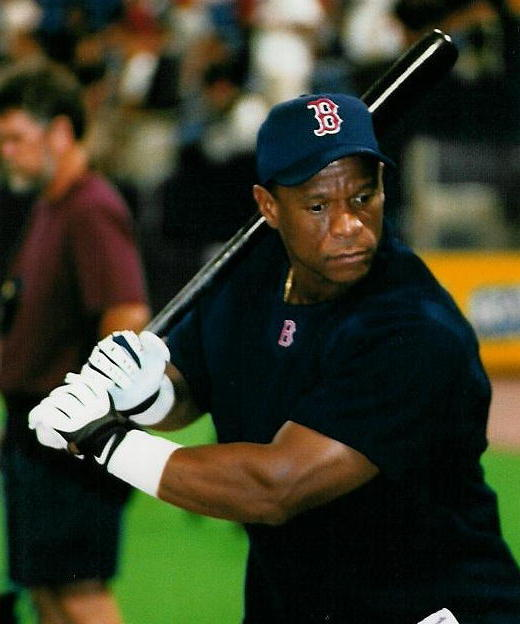
Rickey Henderson

The 1972 All-Star game was dedicated in honor of Roberto Clemente, who had died a week before, while transporting supplies to victims of the 1972 Nicaragua earthquake. Both native and foreign-born players wore a black band on their arms, as a symbol of mourning. The Criollos won the 1973–74 championship, possessing the league's strongest native lineup.

The Indios won the 1973–74 title and the Caribbean Series held in Mexico that year. Caguas won its ninth championship in the 1978–79 season and Bayamón won the last championship of the decade, with a roster that included batting champion Dave Bergman.

Coming back from a fourth-place regular season finish, the Criollos won their tenth championship in the 1980–81 season, but the Caribbean Series were not held that year. On January 2, 1981, Rickey Henderson established a new stolen bases record with 42.

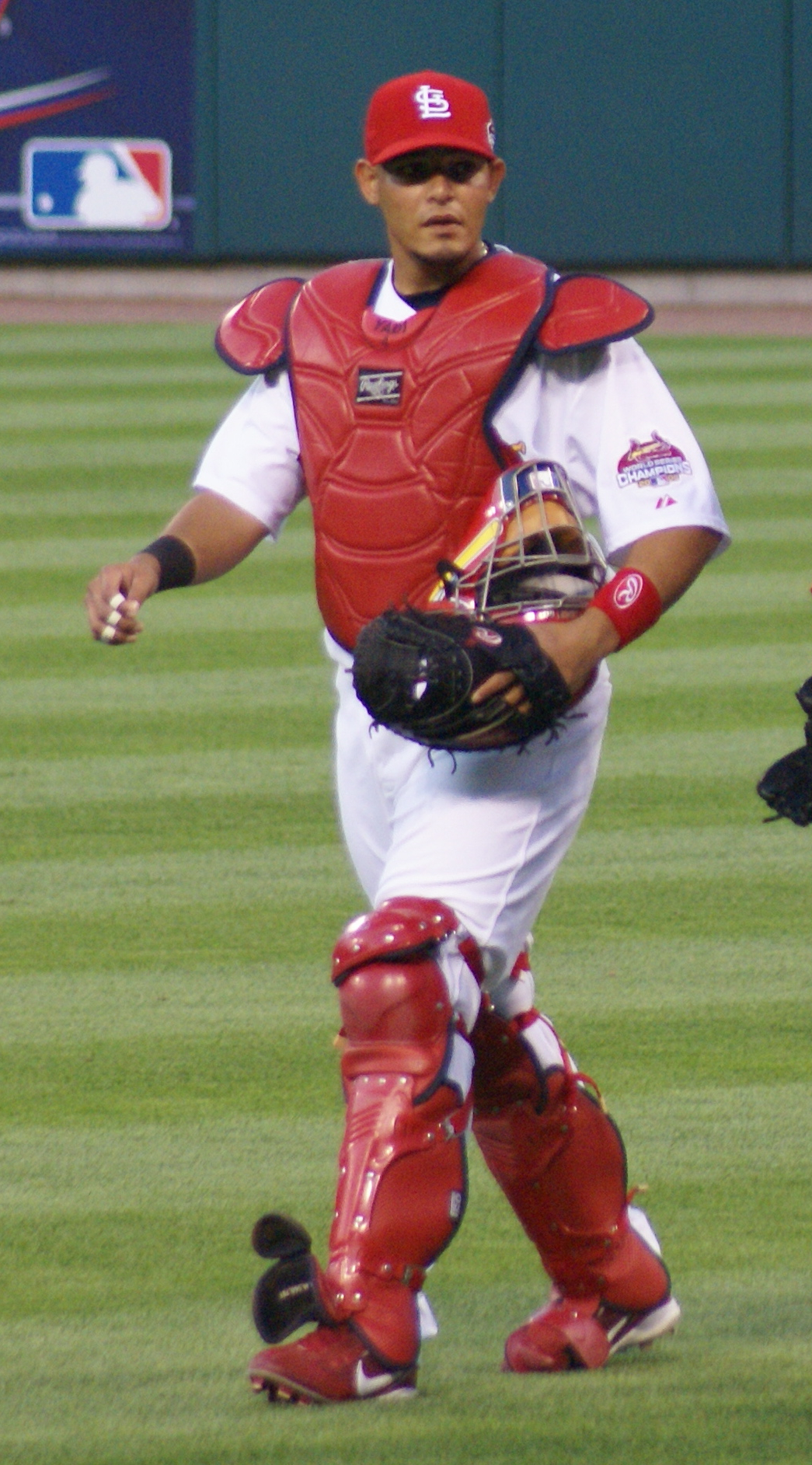
Yadier Molina

Orlando Gómez made his debut as a manager for Mayagüez and won the Manager of the Year award. Dickie Thon won the first of two back-to-back batting titles this season. This also marked Alomar, Sr.'s last active season, retiring forth on the fourth place of league's all-time hit leaders.

In 1981–82, the Lobos de Arecibo recessed and their native star players, Edwin Núñez, Candy Maldonado and Ramón Avilés were drafted by the remaining teams. The team returned the following season, winning the franchise's first championship. The team won the 1983 Caribbean Series, receiving a large welcoming ceremony at Isla Verde International Airport that included a parade from San Juan to Arecibo.

From 1974 to 1983, the team hosted their games in Estadio Juan Ramón Loubriel, which has 12,500 seats. Located at Route 2 and Route 5, in Bayamón, Puerto Rico, the stadium has easy access with a metro station (known as Deportivo Station) on the stadium premises.

In 1982–83, Bayamón's Carmelo Martínez was selected MVP. Mayagüez won the 1983–84 season, with Santurce's Jerry Willard being selected MVP. Besides this, the players were rewarded with a cruise trip and met the Governor of Puerto Rico. Eduardo Figueroa led the league in ERA, winning the recognition of Comeback Player of the Year.

For the 1984–85 season, the Vaqueros were moved back to San Juan and re-adopted their original name, the Senadores de San Juan. However, one year later they were rechristened as the Metros de San Juan, a name that they conserved until 1994. The team won the LBPPR title that season.

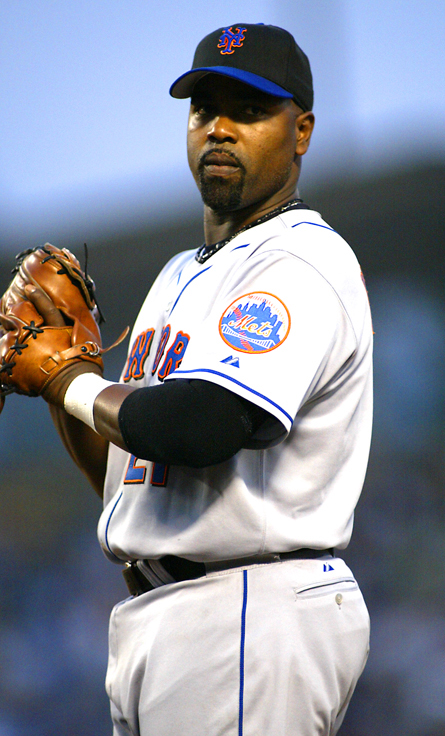
Carlos Delgado

The Metros de San Juan also won the Caribbean Series being led by Francisco Javier Oliveras, who won a game in the series and had previously recorded eight regular season wins and one in the semifinals. Henry Cotto of Caguas was selected the league's MVP. Rubén Sierra debuted for Santurce and won the league's Rookie of the Year award.

One of Puerto Rico's most successful managers, Mako Oliveras, made his managing debut in December 1984, subsequently becoming responsible for giving playing time to unknown prospects such as Benito Santiago, Edgar Martínez and Carlos Baerga, all of which would go on to become stars. Mayagüez won the 1985–86 championship.

This marked Roberto Alomar's debut in the LBPPR, debuting for the Criollos after being drafted by Arecibo while in high school. Caguas won the 1986–87 championship, the team went on to win the Caribbean Series, featuring a native lineup that included Alomar, Carmelo Martínez, Edgar Díaz, Germán Rivera, Henry Cotto, Orlando Mercado and Heidi Vargas. This was José Cruz's final year in the league, having amassed 119 home runs, 40 for the Leones and 70 with Caguas, finishing second in the all-time list.

The Indios de Mayagüez won the 1985–86 season, led by Luis Quiñones’ three home runs in the finals over San Juan. Caguas won the 1986–87 championship and their third Caribbean Series‘ title, being led by a lineup that included Cotto and Oliveras. Mayagüez won the first of back to back titles in 1987–88.

The 1988 All-Star Game commemorated the league's 50th anniversary, and the game was dedicated to Angel Colon. That year, the Metro region defeated the Island region, 1–0. Mayagüez went on to win the 1988–89 title, once again led by Quiñones' clutch hitting. Javier López debuted in 1988, winning the league's Rookie of the Year recognition.

=== Rivalry with LBPRD and "Dream Team" ===
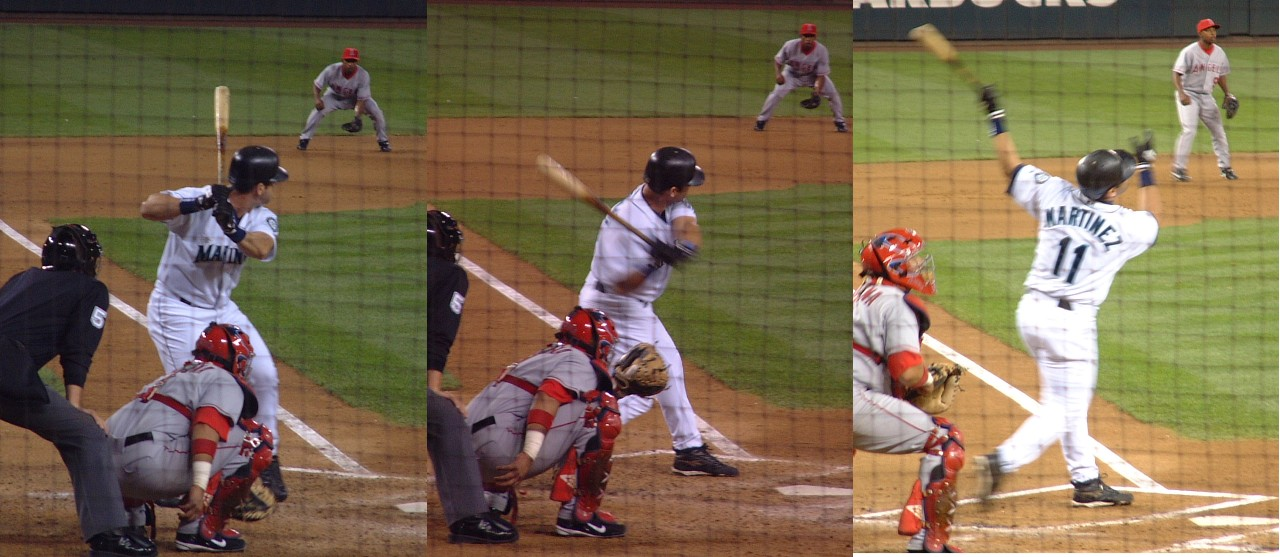
Edgar Martínez at bat

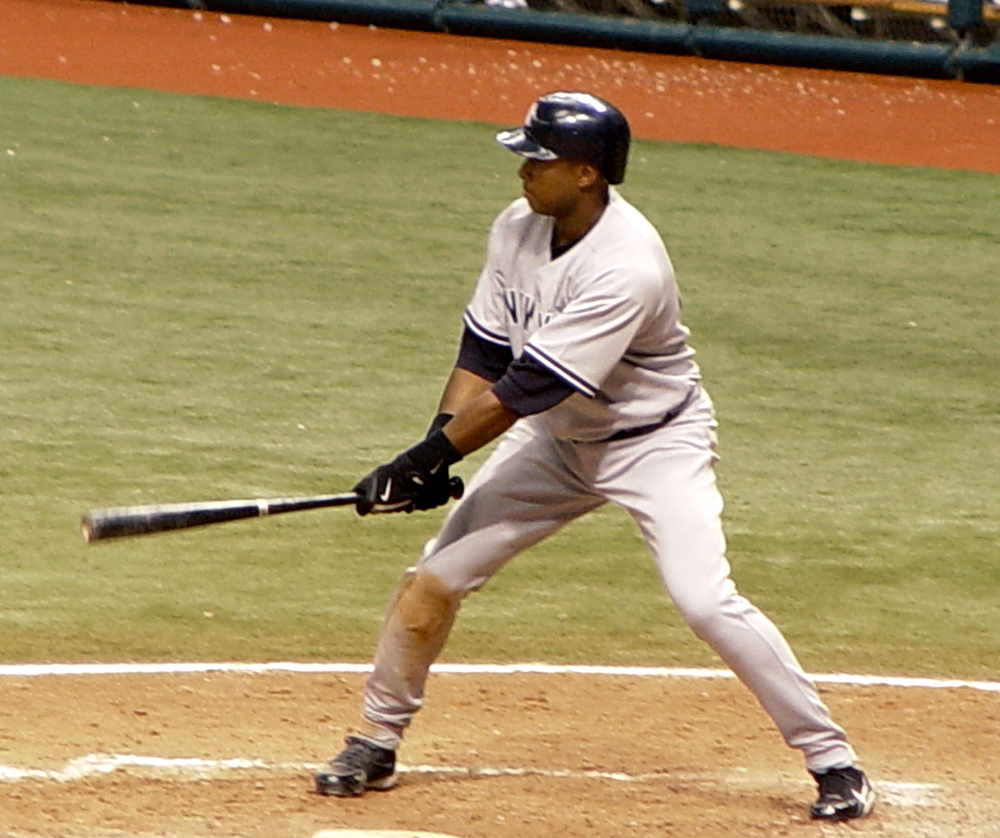
Bernie Williams at bat.

San Juan won the championship in the 1989–90 season. The season featured the debut of Juan González, who under the initiative of that season's Manager of the Year, Ramón Avilés, played every game with Caguas, finishing second in home runs with 9 and RBIs with 34. He was traded for Roberto Alomar during the off-season. González also reinforced San Juan, recording two home runs in the Caribbean Series.

Carlos Baerga and Edgar Martínez were the co-MVP players of the 1989–90 season.

Martínez became the first player in 41 seasons to win the batting crown with an average above.400, registering .424.

Santurce won the title the following year, which featured the debut of Wil Cordero, who was named Rookie of the Year.

In the 1991–1992 season, the Criollos de Caguas franchise was moved to Bayamón, but experienced low attendance in that municipality. Due to this their star players, Juan González and Iván Rodríguez, were drafted by Santurce and Mayagüez respectively.

The Indios won that season's championship and the Caribbean Series held in Mexico, with Chad Kreuter winning the series’ MVP award.

Roberto Hernandez won a tie-breaker with Venezuela to secure the series, and Cordero was recognized as the league MVP.

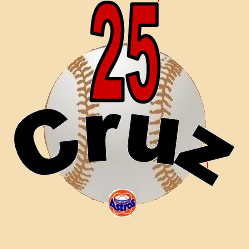
José Cruz's number 25 was retired by the Houston Astros in 1992.

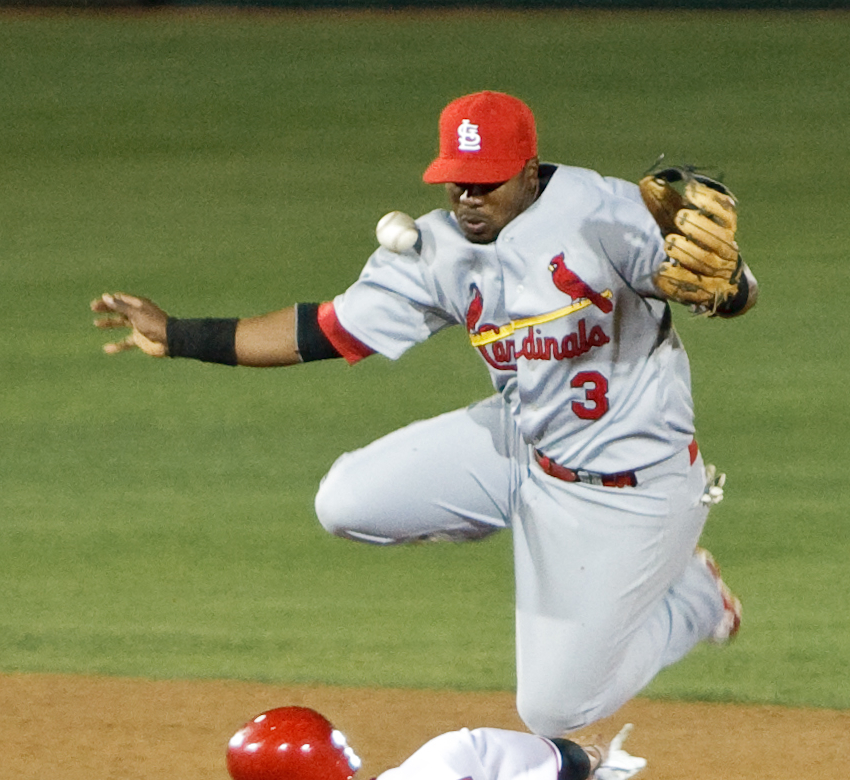
Rubén Gotay

The 1992–93 season featured the return of Dickie Thon to the league, who led Santurce to a championship over San Juan in the finals as well as the debut of José "Cheo" Cruz as a manager. The finals series featured both Thon and Juan González, which attracted 90,369 fans throughout six games, including a record of 23,701 in the last game.

González had won consecutive batting titles in Major League Baseball and was selected the MVP after recording an average of .333 with seven home runs and 14 RBIs. Other MLB players, including Iván Rodríguez, Sandy Alomar Jr. and Omar Olivares returned to the league during that season.

The Cangrejeros went on to win their fourth Caribbean Series’ title. Cordero won the league's batting championship.

Until 1993, all of the ballparks featured natural grass, with Ponce being the first to install artificial turn during that year.

The Senadores de San Juan defeated Cuba on December 1, 1993, with a walk-off home run by Javier López.

The 1993–94 championship was won by San Juan, led by Carmelo Martínez in his second MVP season.

The Criollos rejoined the league for the 1994–95 season and González returned to the team. The Cangrejeros won that year's championship, repeating Puerto Rico's title in the Caribbean Series.

The 1994–95 season however, is most famous for the once-in-a-lifetime Dream Team, that has been compared to the Murderer's Row of the New York Yankees during the Babe Ruth era.

That year, the Senadores de San Juan managed by Luis "Torito" Meléndez won the title, subsequently assembling one of the strongest teams in the history of the Caribbean Series.

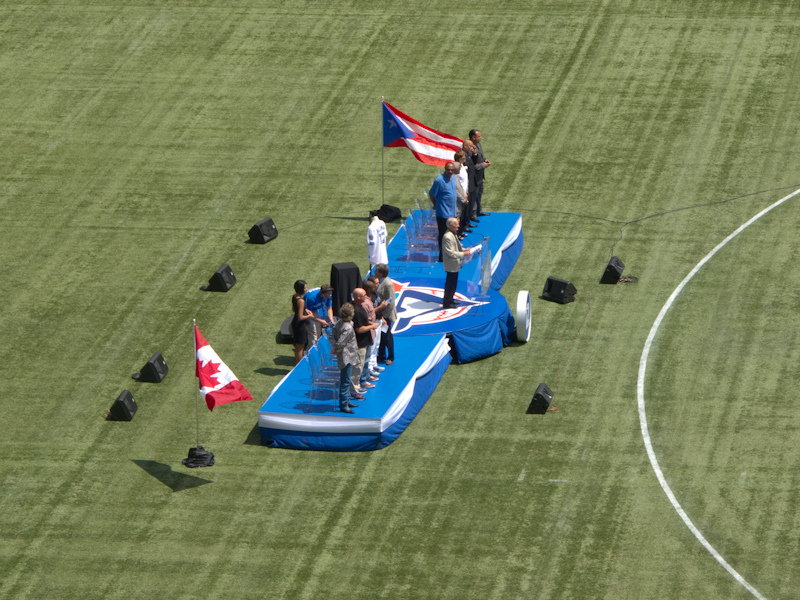
2011 Hall of Fame Ceremony for Roberto Alomar

The group was dubbed the "Dream Team" and featured Major League Baseball players in most positions, including Roberto Alomar, Carlos Baerga, Bernie Williams, Juan González, Edgar Martínez, Carlos Delgado, Rubén Sierra, Rey Sánchez and Carmelo Martínez.

Puerto Rico's offensive dominated the tournament, eventually winning the Caribbean Series championship with an undefeated record of 6–0.

The team won against Pedro Martínez and José Rijo in the third and sixth games respectively.

Roberto Alomar, who had been traded to the team from Ponce for Javier López during the off-season, was named the series’ Most Valuable Player after batting 560 with two home runs.
Later in 2011, Alomar was inducted into Major League Baseball's Hall of Fame.

=== Suspension and re-structuring ===
In August 2007, it was announced that the 2007–2008 season was cancelled due to shrinking attendance and profits over the last 10 years, and the league would instead work on a marketing plan and reorganization.

In May 2008, it was announced that the league would come back for the 2008–09 season, and that the Manatí Athenians would be moved once again to Santurce, and become the Santurce Crabbers. As part of the restructuring, Major League Baseball offered to work to increase publicity.

On July 15, 2008, personnel from the league and Major League Baseball participated in a meeting where details about the league's merchandising were discussed.

=== The return of Pudge Rodríguez ===
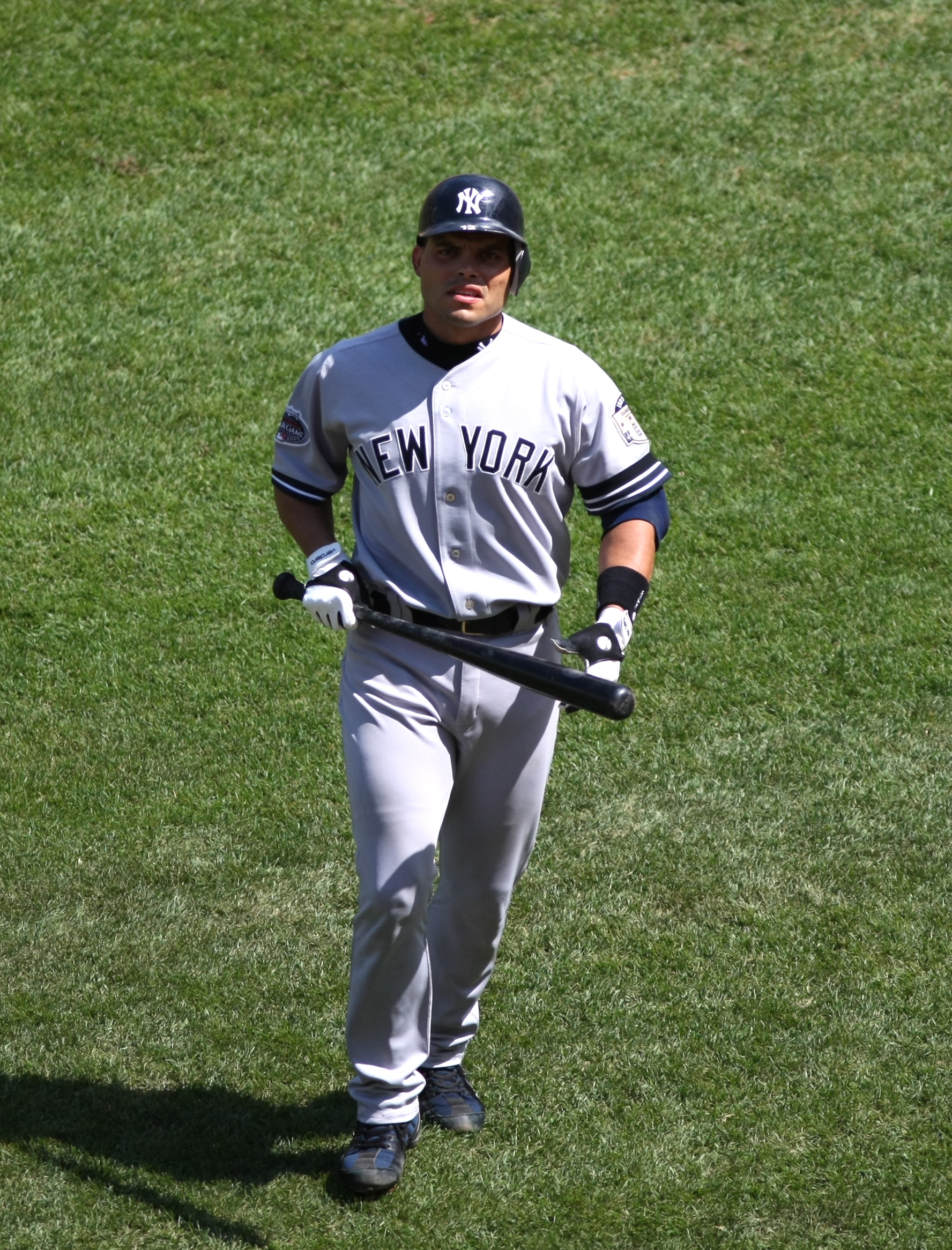
Ivan Rodríguez with the New York Yankees in 2008

Iván Rodríguez (also known as "Pudge") is recognized as one of the greatest catchers to ever play the game. In preparation for the 2009 World Baseball Classic, Pudge returned to the Puerto Rico Baseball League during the offseason, following ten years of absence.

On January 8, 2008, the Leones de Ponce had reclaimed Rodríguez in the last turn of a special post-season draft, where players from eliminated teams were selected to reinforce those that qualified. However, in the first week of December 2009, Rodríguez re-joined the Criollos de Caguas in the PRBL.

Playing for the Criollos de Caguas, he posted a batting average of .370, three RBIs and one home run in six games during the regular season. Upon leaving the team on vacation, Rodríguez announced his intention to return if the Criollos advanced to the playoffs.

He returned to action in a "sudden death" game for the final postseason space, but the team lost and was eliminated.

=== 2009–2010 season ===
On October 19, 2009, the league announced a contract with WIPR-TV to broadcast its games.

The 2009–10 season was inaugurated on November 20, 2009, with games between Ponce and Carolina, and Arecibo versus Mayagüez-Aguadilla. This marked the first year that the league had only five active participants since 1993–94 due to the Cangrejeros' recess. During this season, the inter-league games with the Dominican Winter Baseball League continued being included in the official record books of both organizations.

Indios de Mayagüez won the 2009–10 season, their 16th championship (the mostst in LPBPR history) when they beat the Criollos de Caguas, four games to one. Three games in this series went to extra innings.

In this same season, the board of directors elected Sadi Antonmattei to succeed Garcia as the president of the league.

=== 2010–2013 ===
The Criollos de Caguas are currently the dominant team in the Puerto Rico Baseball League. They were the league champs in 2010–2011 and 2012–2013, and the Indios de Mayagüez won in 2011–2012.

On November 27, 2012, in a friendly softball game between nine professional ballplayers from the Puerto Rico Baseball League and nine prisoners from the Bayamón Correctional Institution, the prisoners won convincingly by a score of 10–3.

=== International reputation ===
The Puerto Rico National Baseball Team has participated in the World Cup of Baseball winning one gold (1951), four silver and four bronze medals. The team has also won the Caribbean Series fourteen times.

=== Current teams ===
Team	City	Stadium	Capacity
Atenienses de Manati	Manatí	Estadio Municipal Pedro Román Meléndez	8,500
Criollos de Caguas	Caguas	Parque Yldefonso Solá Morales	10,000
Gigantes de Carolina	Carolina	Roberto Clemente Stadium	12,500
Indios de Mayagüez	Mayagüez	Isidoro García Baseball Stadium	10,500
Leones de Ponce	Ponce	Francisco Montaner Stadium	16,000
Cangrejeros de Santurce	Santurce, San Juan	Hiram Bithorn Stadium	18,000

=== Former teams ===
- Lobos de Arecibo
- Metropolitanos de San Juan
- Atenienses de Manatí
- Venerables y Brujos de Guayama
- Vaqueros de Bayamón
- Tiburones de Aguadilla
- Piratas Kofresi de Ponce
- Grises de Humacao
- Cangrejeros de Santurce
- Senadores de San Juan

== See also ==
- Baseball awards
- Sports in Puerto Rico
- Puerto Rico Baseball League
- Caribbean World Series
- List of Major League Baseball players from Puerto Rico
- List of current Major League Baseball players from Puerto Rico
- List of Puerto Ricans – Sports
- List of countries with their first Major League Baseball player
