= Atenienses de Manatí =

Atenienses de Manatí may refer to:

- Atenienses de Manatí (baseball)
- Atenienses de Manatí (basketball)
