= Estadio Municipal Pedro Román Meléndez =

Multi-use stadium in Manatí, Puerto Rico

Coordinates: 18.4237663°N 66.4715016°W

Estadio Municipal Pedro Román Meléndez (English: Pedro Román Meléndez Municipal Stadium) is a multi-use stadium in Manatí, Puerto Rico. It is currently used mostly for baseball games and is the home of Atenienses de Manatí. The stadium holds 8,500 people.

In 1992, the stadium was named after Pedro Román Meléndez, former owner of the Atenienses de Manatí in amateur town ball. The stadium was remodeled to host the Atenienses de Manati for the 2019–2020 season.
