= Rafaelito Ortiz =

Puerto Rican baseball player (born 1914)

- Pitcher
- Born: July 12, 1914; Guayanilla, Puerto Rico
- Died: December 19, 1989 (aged 75); Guayanilla, Puerto Rico
- Batted: Right Threw: Right

Negro league baseball debut
- 1948, for the Chicago American Giants

Last appearance
- 1948, for the Chicago American Giants

Teams
- Chicago American Giants (1948)

Rafael Ortiz Correa (July 12, 1914 – December 19, 1989) was a Puerto Rican pitcher who played in the Negro leagues in the 1940s.

A native of Guayanilla, Puerto Rico, Ortiz played for the Chicago American Giants in 1948. He died in his hometown of Guayanilla in 1989 at age 75.
