= Atenienses de Manatí (baseball) =

Professional baseball team based in Manatí, Puerto Rico

Atenienses de Manatí (English: Athenians) is a professional baseball team based in Manatí, Puerto Rico. Atenienses is the team name for most sport teams representing Manatí in state-level tournaments.

The Atenienses appeared in Liga de Béisbol Profesional Roberto Clemente when José Valentín acquired the Cangrejeros de Santurce and relocated them to Manatí for the 2004–05 season. For the 2008–09 season, the team returned to San Juan as the Cangrejeros, after which the league was suspended only to return in 2012 and 2013, and from 2019 to the present.

Their home stadium in Manatí is the Estadio Municipal Pedro Román Meléndez.

On January 11, 2021, the team was given the go ahead to play again, after having cancelled games due to the COVID-19 pandemic.

In January 2021,Yadier Molina, a Major League Baseball catcher who played for the St. Louis Cardinals for 18 years, said he wanted to play for the Atenienses and the league was looking to work him into the season.
