= List of Major League Baseball career assists leaders =

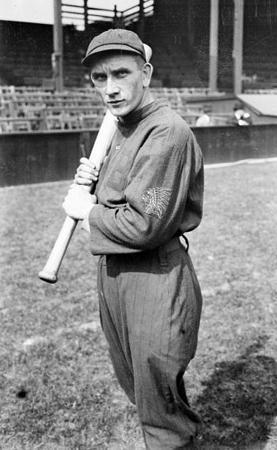
Rabbit Maranville, the all-time leader in assists.

In baseball, an assist (denoted by A) is a defensive statistic, baseball being one of the few sports in which the defensive team controls the ball. An assist is credited to every defensive player who fields or touches the ball (after it has been hit by the batter) prior to the recording of a putout, even if the contact was unintentional. For example, if a ball strikes a player's leg and bounces off him to another fielder, who tags the baserunner, the first player is credited with an assist. A fielder can receive a maximum of one assist per out recorded. An assist is also credited if a putout would have occurred, had another fielder not committed an error. For example, a shortstop might field a ground ball cleanly, but the first baseman might drop his throw. In this case, an error would be charged to the first baseman, and the shortstop would be credited with an assist.

Rabbit Maranville is the all-time leader with 8,967 career assists. Ozzie Smith (8,375), Cal Ripken Jr. (8,214), Bill Dahlen (8,138), Omar Vizquel (8,050), and Luis Aparicio (8,016) are the only other players to record more than 8,000 career assists.

== Key ==
**Rank**	Rank amongst leaders in career assists. A blank field indicates a tie.
**Player (2026 As)**	Number of recorded assists during the 2026 Major League Baseball season.
**A**	Total career assists.
*	Denotes elected to National Baseball Hall of Fame.
**Bold**	Denotes active player. (Note: A player is considered inactive if he has announced his retirement or has not played for a full season.)

== List ==
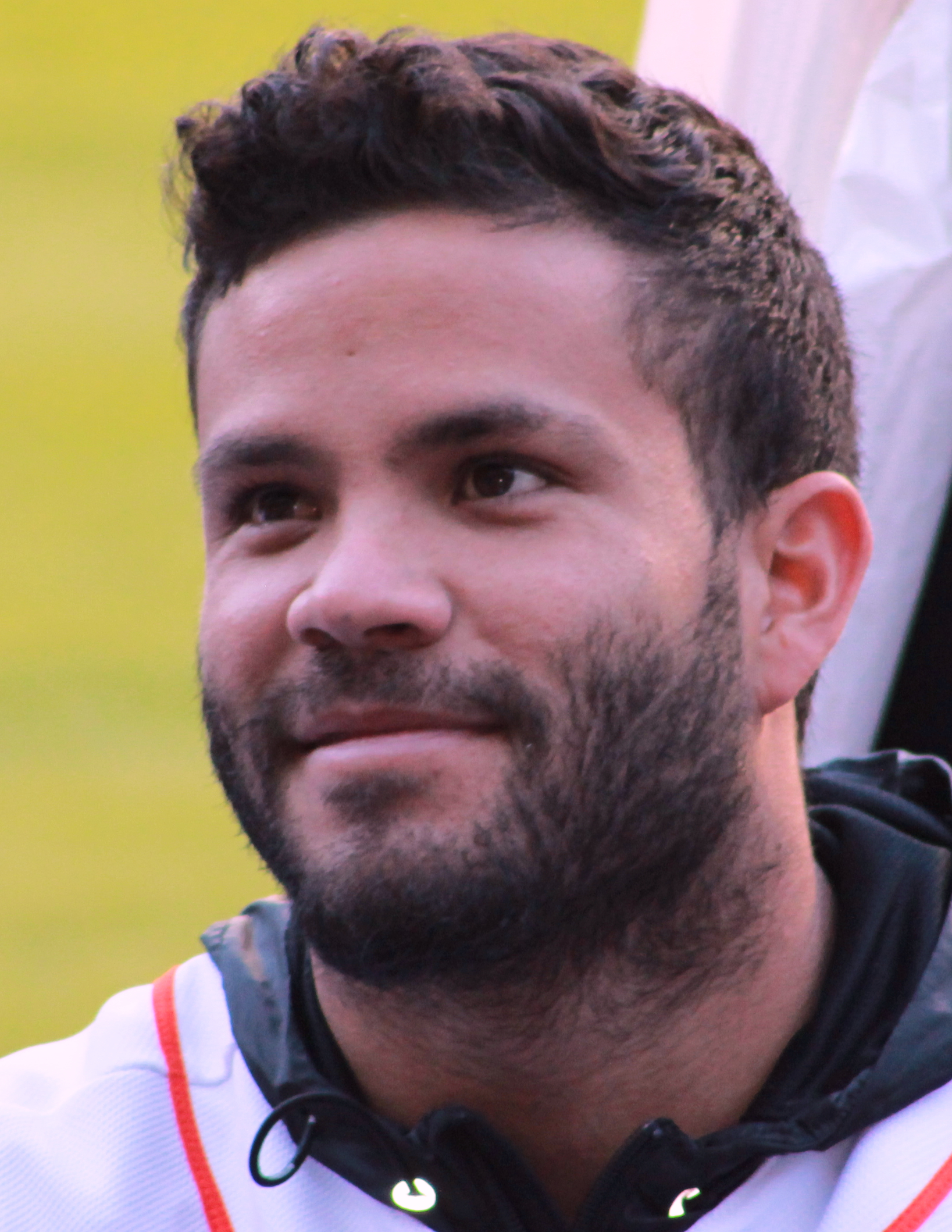
Jose Altuve, the active leader and 128th all-time in assists.

- Stats updated as of September 25, 2026.

Rank	Player (2026 As)	A
1	Rabbit Maranville*	8,967
2	Ozzie Smith*	8,375
3	Cal Ripken Jr.*	8,214
4	Bill Dahlen	8,138
5	Omar Vizquel	8,050
6	Luis Aparicio*	8,016
7	Eddie Collins*	7,716
8	Luke Appling*	7,543
9	Tommy Corcoran	7,509
10	Bobby Wallace*	7,465
11	Frankie Frisch*	7,170
12	Charlie Gehringer*	7,091
13	Dave Concepción	7,024
14	Joe Morgan*	6,969
15	Bid McPhee*	6,923
16	Larry Bowa	6,864
17	Rogers Hornsby*	6,842
18	Honus Wagner*	6,782
19	Bill Mazeroski*	6,694
20	Nap Lajoie*	6,691
21	Lou Whitaker	6,653
22	Ryne Sandberg*	6,648
23	Frank White	6,629
24	Derek Jeter*	6,605
25	Dave Bancroft*	6,604
26	Roberto Alomar*	6,536
27	Don Kessinger	6,453
28	George Davis*	6,429
29	Nellie Fox*	6,385
30	Dick Bartell	6,348
31	Willie Randolph	6,339
32	Roger Peckinpaugh	6,338
33	Herman Long	6,335
34	Bert Campaneris	6,323
35	Germany Smith	6,304
36	Donie Bush	6,286
37	Alan Trammell*	6,265
38	Chris Speier	6,259
39	Roy McMillan	6,233
40	Brooks Robinson*	6,220
41	Miguel Tejada	6,193
42	Jimmy Rollins	6,139
43	Pee Wee Reese*	6,131
44	Garry Templeton	6,078
45	Joe Cronin*	6,052
46	Jack Glasscock	5,951
	Joe Tinker*	5,951
48	Jeff Kent*	5,918
49	Royce Clayton	5,904
50	Bobby Grich	5,891

Rank	Player (2026 As)	A
51	Robinson Canó	5,881
52	Dick Groat	5,864
	Barry Larkin*	5,864
54	Mark Belanger	5,831
55	Billy Herman*	5,823
56	Bill Russell	5,713
57	Bobby Doerr*	5,710
58	Édgar Rentería	5,706
59	Alex Rodriguez	5,681
60	Craig Biggio*	5,671
61	Jay Bell	5,609
62	Mickey Doolan	5,585
63	Tony Fernández	5,544
64	Fred Pfeffer	5,530
65	Maury Wills	5,512
66	Ed Brinkman	5,500
67	Red Schoendienst*	5,466
68	Billy Jurges	5,446
69	Orlando Cabrera	5,445
70	Leo Cárdenas	5,429
71	Elvis Andrus	5,419
72	Monte Cross	5,378
73	Ozzie Guillén	5,375
74	Kid Gleason	5,324
75	George McBride	5,316
76	Alfredo Griffin	5,309
77	Graig Nettles	5,295
78	Art Fletcher	5,254
79	Del Pratt	5,238
80	Joe Sewell*	5,230
81	Ian Kinsler	5,219
82	Johnny Evers*	5,215
83	Mike Schmidt*	5,193
84	Adrián Beltré*	5,187
85	Travis Jackson*	5,178
86	Buddy Myer	5,152
87	Hughie Critz	5,145
88	Jimmy Dykes	5,139
89	Arky Vaughan*	5,119
90	Tim Foli	5,108
91	Everett Scott	5,060
92	John Montgomery Ward*	5,050
93	Buddy Bell	5,009
94	Mark Grudzielanek	4,975
95	Brandon Phillips	4,971
96	Toby Harrah	4,965
97	Claude Ritchey	4,958
98	Ed McKean	4,945
99	Tony Lazzeri*	4,944
100	Jim Gantner	4,942

== By position ==
=== Pitchers ===
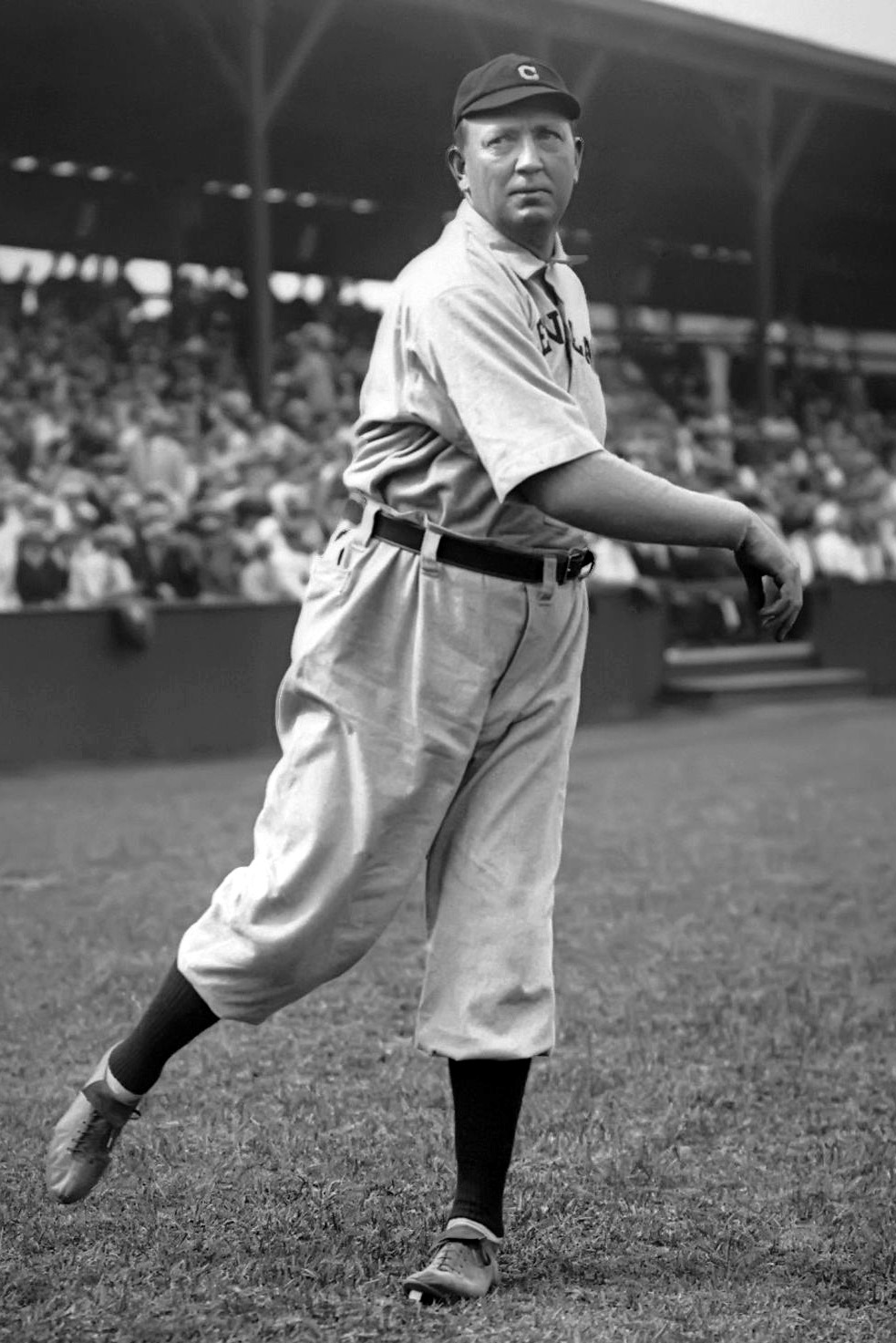
Cy Young, the all-time leader in career assists by a pitcher.

The pitcher is the player who pitches the baseball from the pitcher's mound toward the catcher to begin each play, with the goal of retiring a batter, who attempts to either make contact with the pitched ball or draw a walk. The pitcher is often considered the most important player on the defensive side of the game, playing the most difficult and specialized position, and as such is regarded as being at the right end of the defensive spectrum. Pitchers play far less than players at other positions, generally appearing in only two or three games per week; only one pitcher in major league history has appeared in 100 games in a single season. There are many different types of pitchers, generally divided between starting pitchers and relief pitchers, which include the middle reliever, lefty specialist, setup man, and closer. In the scoring system used to record defensive plays, the pitcher is assigned the number 1.

Pitchers are most commonly credited with an assist when they field a ground ball batted back toward the mound and throw the ball either to the first baseman to retire the batter/runner or to another infielder to force out a runner, perhaps beginning a double play; of special importance are throws to the catcher if a runner is trying to reach home plate to score a run. Pitchers also earn assists on pickoff throws, by throwing to a base after catching a line drive in order to retire a runner before they can tag up, by throwing to a base to record an out on an appeal play, or in situations where they might deflect a ground ball before another defensive player successfully fields the ball. Pitchers generally record fewer assists than infielders or catchers due to the quick reaction time needed to field the ball after it is hit, as the pitcher is the closest player in front of the batter.

As strikeout totals have risen in baseball, the frequency of other defensive outs including ground outs has declined; as a result, assist totals for pitchers have likewise declined, and only one of the top 20 career leaders has been active since 1934; only five of the top 66 have been active since 1965. None of the top 87 single-season totals were recorded after 1918, and none of the top 477 have been recorded since 1944. Cy Young is the all-time leader in career assists as a pitcher with 2,014, over 500 more than any other pitcher.

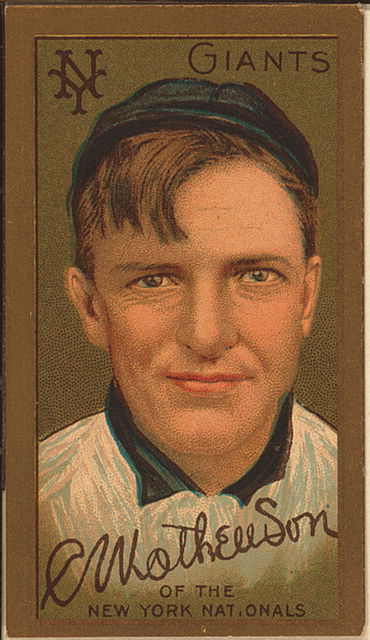
Christy Mathewson holds the National League record.

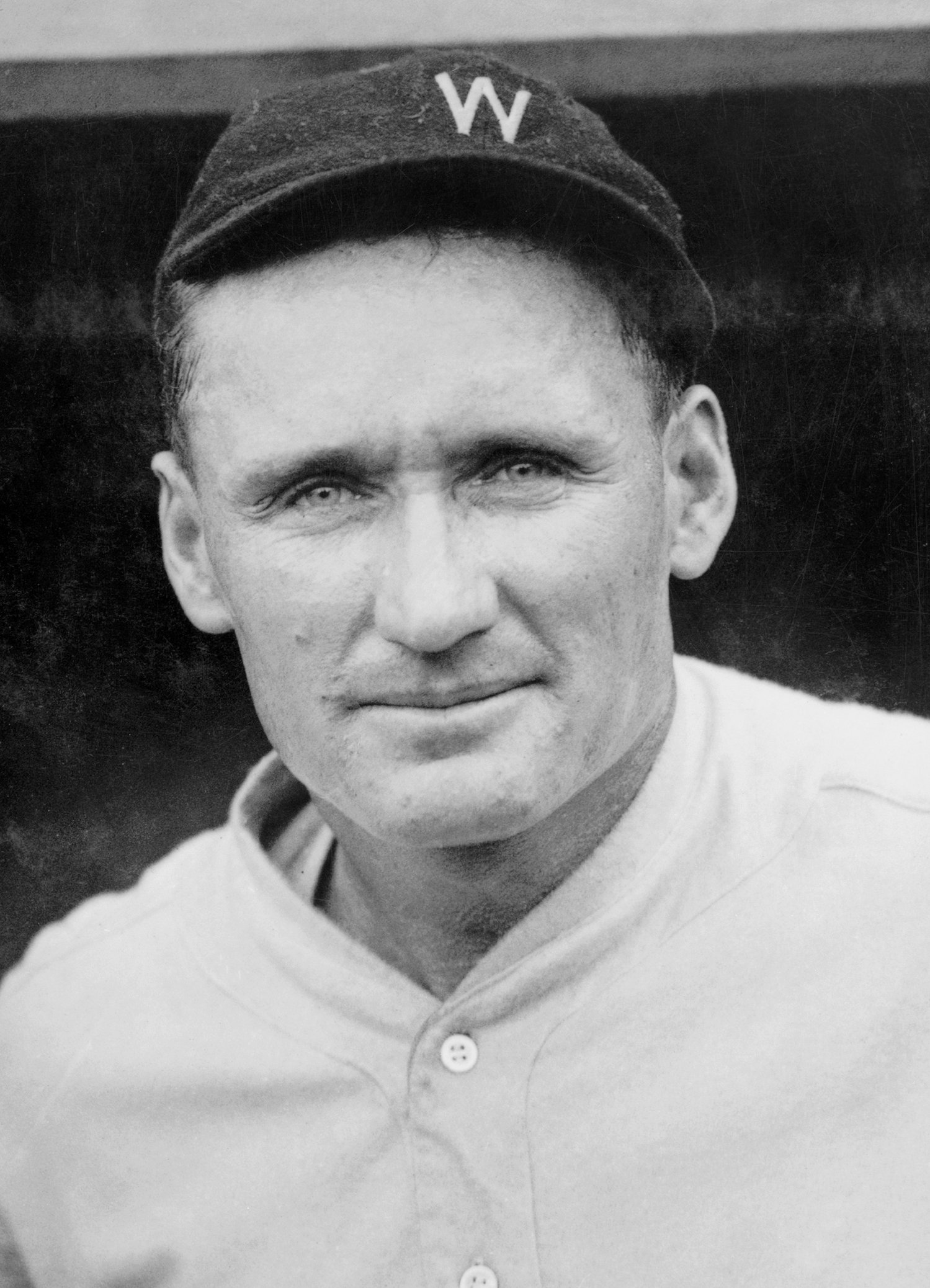
Walter Johnson holds the American League record.

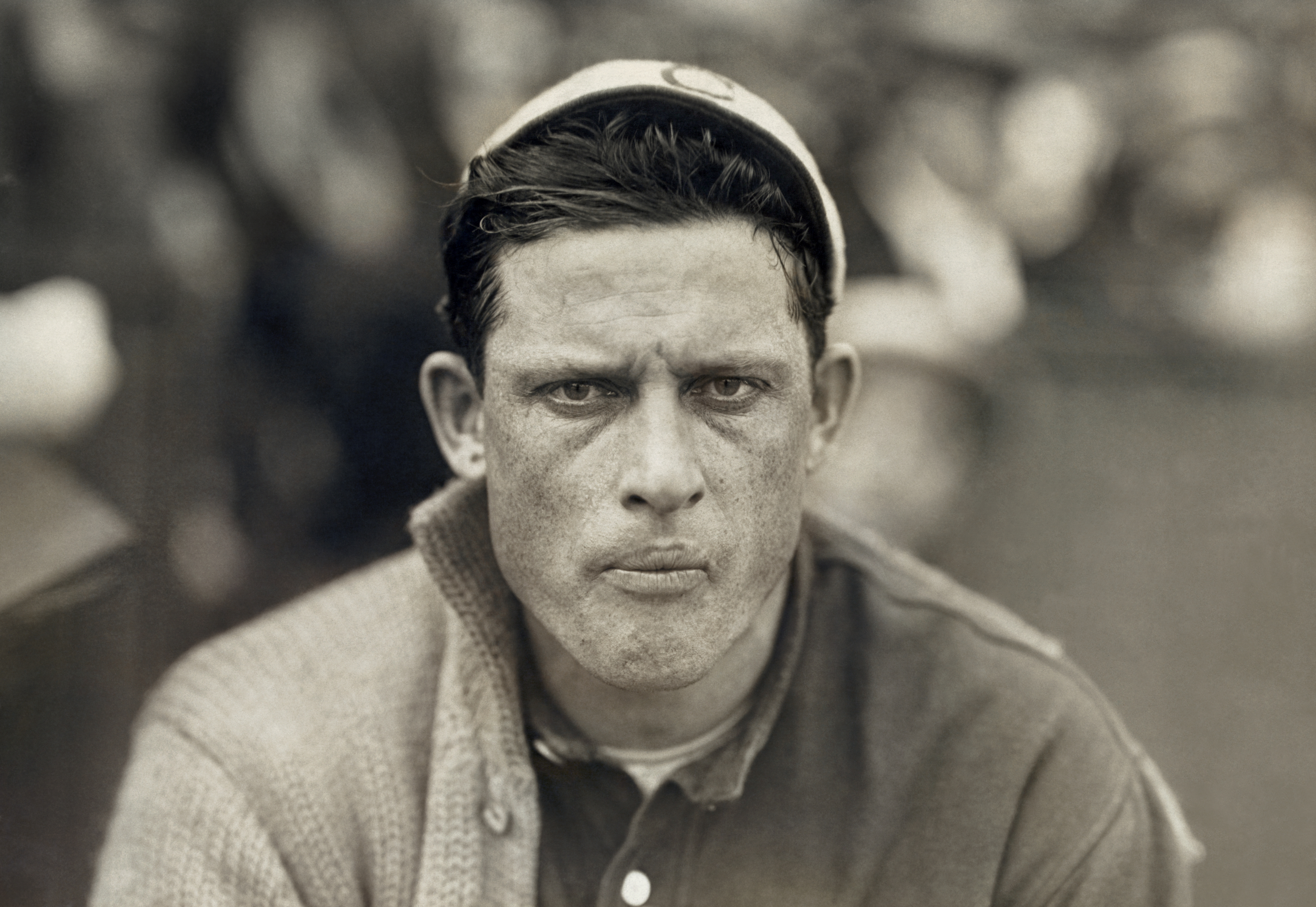
Ed Walsh holds the single-season record of 227.

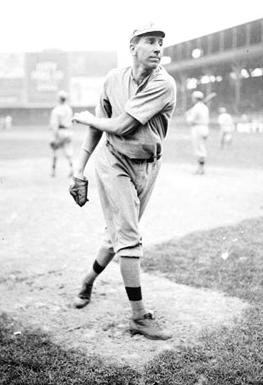
Eppa Rixey holds the record for left-handed pitchers.

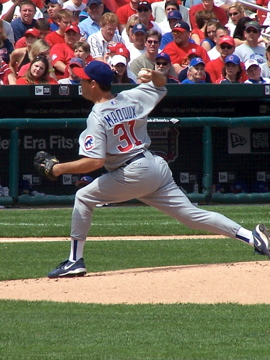
Greg Maddux led the National League in assists a record twelve times.

- Stats updated as of April 3, 2026.

Rank	Player (2026 As)	Throws	Assists as a pitcher			Other leagues, notes
Rank	Player (2026 As)	Throws	MLB	American League	National League	Other leagues, notes
1	Cy Young*	R	2,014	851	1,163	
2	Christy Mathewson*	R	1,503	0	1,503	Holds the modern National League single-season record of 141 (set in 1908)
3	Grover Cleveland Alexander*	R	1,419	0	1,419	
4	Pud Galvin*	R	1,404	0	1,205	Includes 106 in American Association, 71 in Players' League, 22 in National Association; held major league record, 1886-1903; held the National League single-season record, 1884-1885
5	Walter Johnson*	R	1,351	1,351	0	
6	Burleigh Grimes*	R	1,252	7	1,245	
7	George Mullin	R	1,244	1,194	0	Includes 50 in Federal League
8	Jack Quinn	R	1,240	971	67	Includes 202 in Federal League
9	Ed Walsh*	R	1,207	1,200	7	Holds the single-season record of 227 (set in 1907)
10	Eppa Rixey*	L	1,195	0	1,195	
11	Greg Maddux*	R	1,194	0	1,194	
12	John Clarkson*	R	1,143	0	1,143	Holds the National League single-season record of 174 (set in 1885)
13	Carl Mays	R	1,138	823	315	
14	Hooks Dauss	R	1,128	1,128	0	
15	Vic Willis*	R	1,124	0	1,124	
16	Red Faber*	R	1,108	1,108	0	
	Eddie Plank*	L	1,108	1,050	0	Includes 58 in Federal League; held record for left-handed pitchers, 1914-1931
18	Tim Keefe*	R	1,060	0	764	Includes 235 in American Association, 61 in Players' League
19	Tony Mullane	R	1,041	0	343	Includes 698 in American Association
20	Kid Nichols*	R	1,031	0	1,031	
21	Tommy John	L	1,028	758	270	
22	Red Ames	R	1,000	0	1,000	
23	Warren Spahn*	L	999	0	999	
24	Eddie Cicotte	R	998	998	0	
25	Jack Powell	R	967	640	327	
26	Doc White	L	966	811	155	
27	Harry Howell	R	965	876	89	Held the American League single-season record, 1905-1907
28	Al Orth	R	957	588	369	
29	Ted Lyons*	R	943	943	0	
30	Freddie Fitzsimmons	R	942	0	942	
	Charles Radbourn*	R	942	0	843	Includes 99 in Players' League
32	Chick Fraser	R	939	91	848	
33	Bill Doak	R	934	0	934	
34	Joe McGinnity*	R	929	153	776	Held the modern National League single-season record, 1904-1906
35	Jim McCormick	R	922	0	872	Includes 50 in Union Association
36	Red Donahue	R	903	445	458	Held the American League single-season record, 1902-1904
37	Tommy Bond	R	896	0	607	Includes 229 in National Association, 55 in Union Association, 5 in American Association; held major league record, 1879-1886; held the single-season record, 1878-1882; held the National League single-season record, 1878-1884
38	Phil Niekro*	R	878	105	773	
39	Gaylord Perry*	R	877	353	524	
40	Sad Sam Jones	R	874	874	0	
	Amos Rusie*	R	874	0	874	
42	Clark Griffith*	R	863	265	548	Includes 50 in American Association
43	Tom Glavine*	L	856	0	856	
44	Howard Ehmke	R	853	828	0	Includes 25 in Federal League
45	Charlie Buffinton	R	851	0	657	Includes 117 in American Association, 77 in Players' League
	Stan Coveleski*	R	851	851	0	
47	Lee Meadows	R	850	0	850	
48	Addie Joss*	R	846	846	0	
49	Mordecai Brown*	R	843	0	700	Includes 143 in Federal League
50	Waite Hoyt*	R	842	640	202	
51	Jesse Tannehill	L	840	430	410	
52	Bullet Joe Bush	R	839	814	25	
53	Jack Chesbro*	R	836	649	187	Held the American League single-season record, 1904-1905
54	Carl Hubbell*	L	824	0	824	
	Herb Pennock*	L	824	824	0	
56	Ed Reulbach	R	814	0	724	Includes 90 in Federal League
57	Eddie Rommel	R	810	810	0	
58	Charles Bender*	R	808	702	61	Includes 45 in Federal League
59	Bill Dinneen	R	800	513	287	
60	Bobby Mathews	R	791	0	187	Includes 339 in National Association, 265 in American Association
61	Dolf Luque	R	786	0	786	
62	Wilbur Cooper	L	785	4	781	
63	Frank Smith	R	782	606	69	Includes 107 in Federal League
64	Tom Zachary	L	773	547	226	
65	Brickyard Kennedy	R	769	0	769	
	Jim Whitney	R	769	0	761	Includes 8 in American Association
67	Dennis Martínez	R	763	438	325	
68	Willie Sudhoff	R	762	399	363	
69	Art Nehf	L	749	0	749	
70	Jesse Barnes	R	748	0	748	
71	Bucky Walters	R	746	0	746	
72	Gus Weyhing	R	745	3	365	Includes 322 in American Association, 55 in Players' League
73	Jim Kaat*	L	744	641	103	
74	Kenny Rogers	L	743	724	19	
75	Hippo Vaughn	L	740	169	571	
	Rube Waddell*	L	740	607	133	
77	Jack Taylor	R	738	0	738	
78	Mel Harder	R	734	734	0	
	Willis Hudlin	R	734	732	2	
80	Cy Falkenberg	R	728	523	21	Includes 184 in Federal League
81	Steve Carlton*	L	724	31	693	
	Claude Hendrix	R	724	0	518	Includes 206 in Federal League
83	Lefty Grove*	L	722	722	0	
	Adonis Terry	R	722	0	350	Includes 372 in American Association
85	Dutch Leonard	R	719	417	302	
86	Will White	R	715	0	274	Includes 441 in American Association; held the single-season record, 1882-1907
87	Bob Lemon*	R	709	709	0	
88	Mickey Welch*	R	705	0	705	
89	Earl Whitehill	L	701	687	14	
90	Claude Osteen	L	699	155	544	
91	Rube Marquard*	L	697	0	697	
	Bob Shawkey	R	697	697	0	
93	Ed Willett	R	695	602	0	Includes 93 in Federal League
94	Theodore Breitenstein	L	692	0	690	Includes 2 in American Association
	Tom Seaver*	R	692	99	593	
96	Pink Hawley	R	688	55	633	
97	Don Drysdale*	R	686	0	686	
	Sherry Smith	L	686	255	431	
99	Bob Groom	R	682	545	0	Includes 137 in Federal League
100	Rube Benton	L	680	0	680	

=== Catchers ===
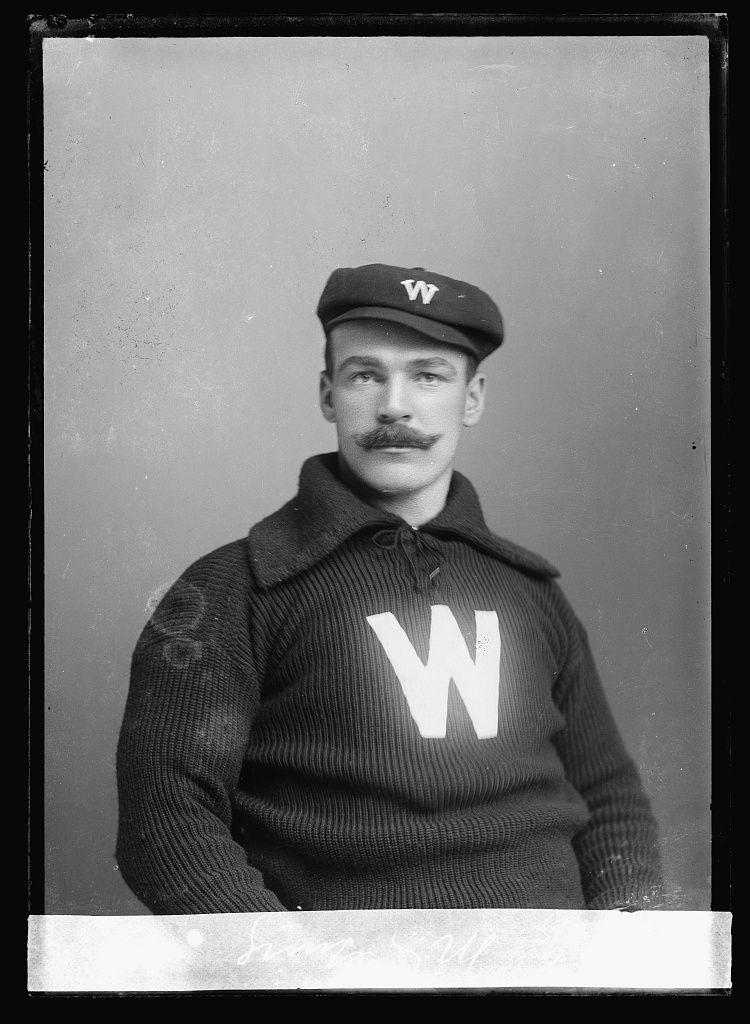
Deacon McGuire, the all-time leader in assists by a catcher.

The catcher is a position for a baseball or softball player. When a batter takes his/her turn to hit, the catcher crouches behind home plate, in front of the (home) umpire, and receives the ball from the pitcher. In addition to these primary duties, the catcher is also called upon to master many other skills in order to field the position well. The role of the catcher is similar to that of the wicket-keeper in cricket. In the numbering system used to record defensive plays, the catcher is assigned the number 2.

Catchers are most frequently credited with an assist when they throw out a runner attempting a stolen base, although catchers who are especially adept at catching runners in a steal attempt can paradoxically have fewer assists due to runners attempting to steal less often when that catcher is in the game. Other situations leading to an assist include bunts where the catcher fields the batted ball near home plate and throws out the batter at first base (or another runner), an uncaught third strike after which the catcher throws out the batter trying to reach first base, rundown plays in which a runner is stranded between bases, and throwing out runners who fail to tag up after a fly ball out. As the frequency of strikeouts has risen in baseball, the number of other fielding outs has declined; the rise of power-hitting has also led to a decline in more daring baserunning. Consequently, the list of career assist leaders is dominated by catchers from the dead-ball era prior to 1920, when runners made more aggressive attempts to advance around the bases in risky situations; none of the top 20 players were active after 1931, and only three players since 1950 have reached even 60% of the record. None of the top 65 single-season totals were recorded after 1920, and none of the top 340 were recorded after 1928; only 13 seasons of 100 assists have been recorded since 1945, peaking at 108, far short of the record of 238. As a result, both the career and single-season records are likely among Major League Baseball's most unbreakable records.

Deacon McGuire is the all-time leader with 1,860 career assists. Only 48 catchers have recorded 1,000 or more career assists.

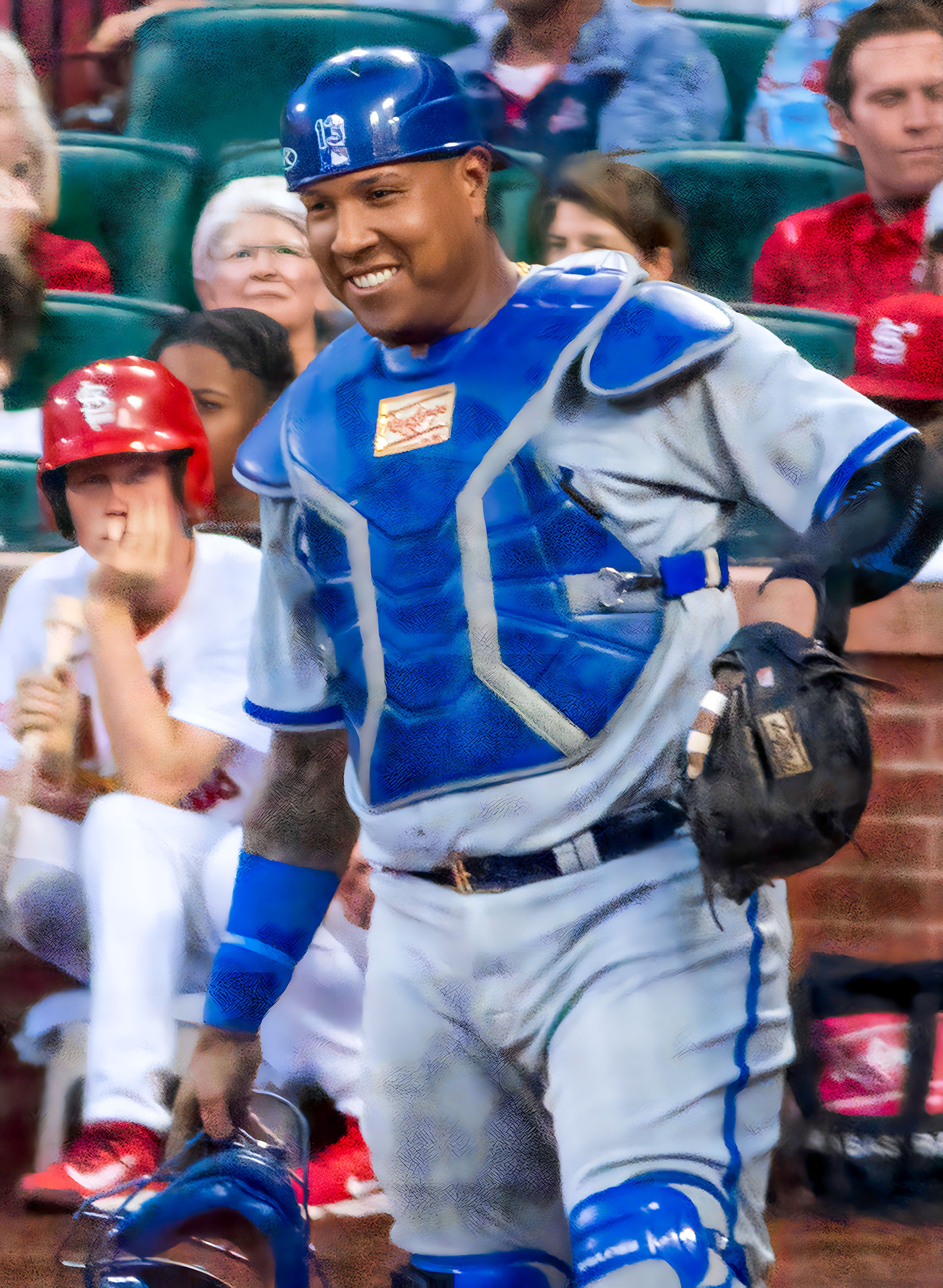
Salvador Perez, the active leader in assists by a catcher and is tied for 104th all-time.

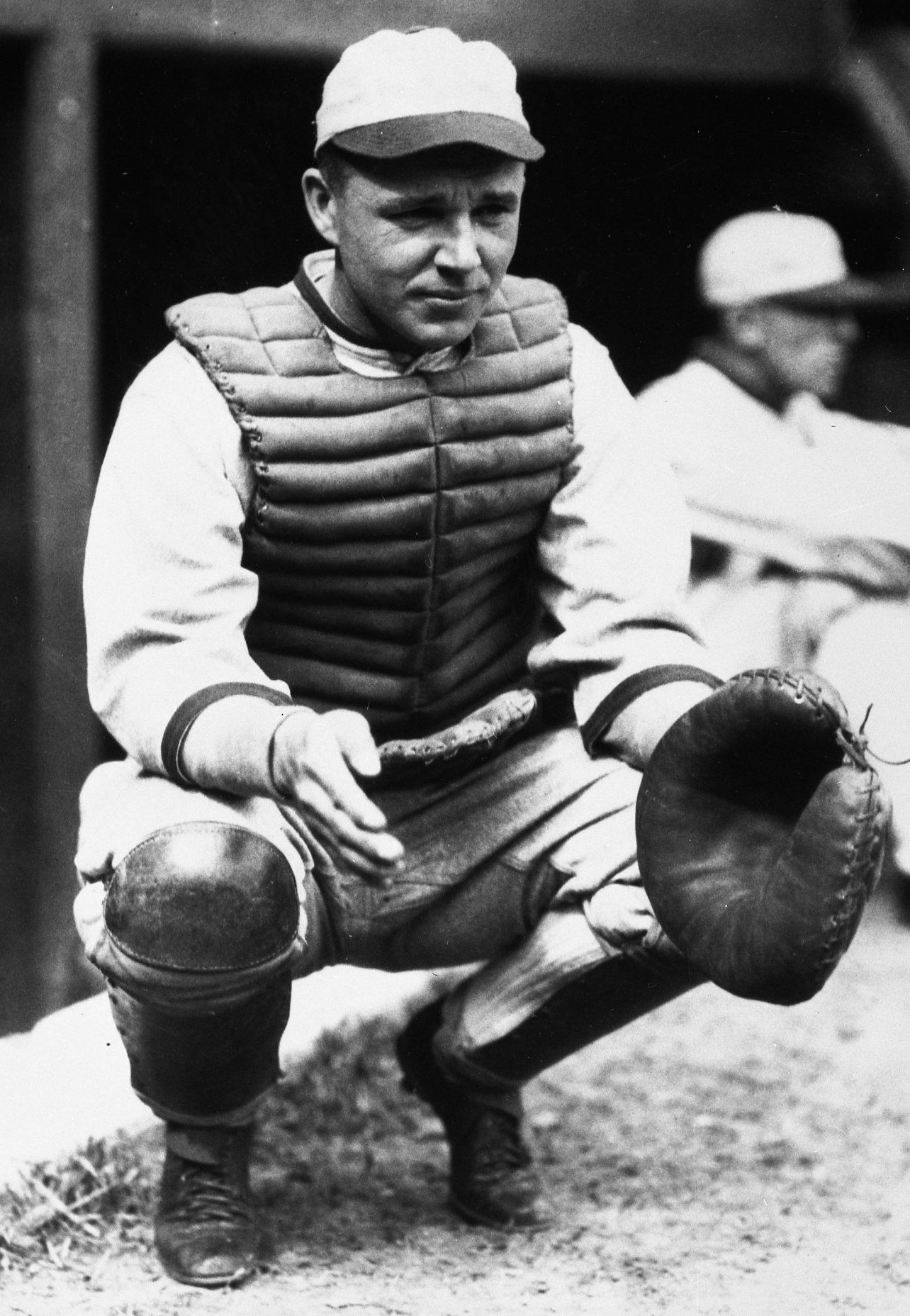
Ray Schalk, holder of the American League career record

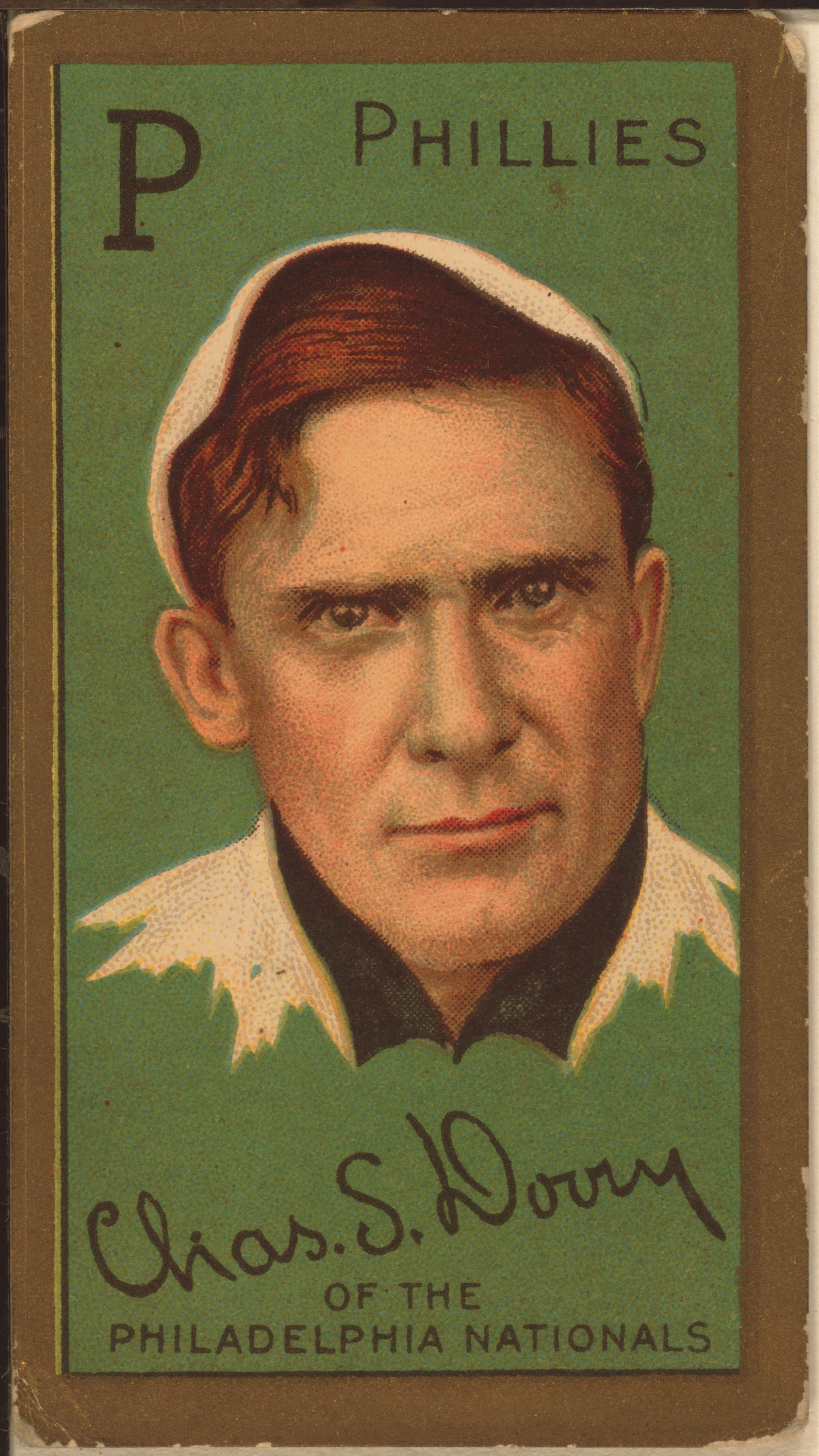
Red Dooin, holder of the National League career record

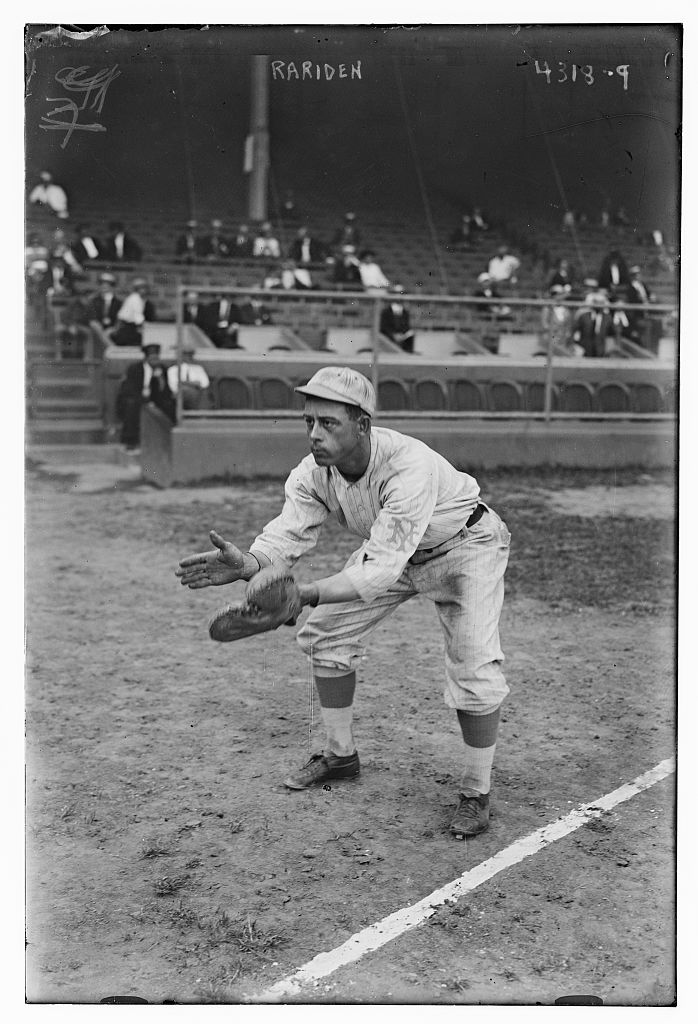
Bill Rariden posted the two highest assist totals in history in the short-lived Federal League.

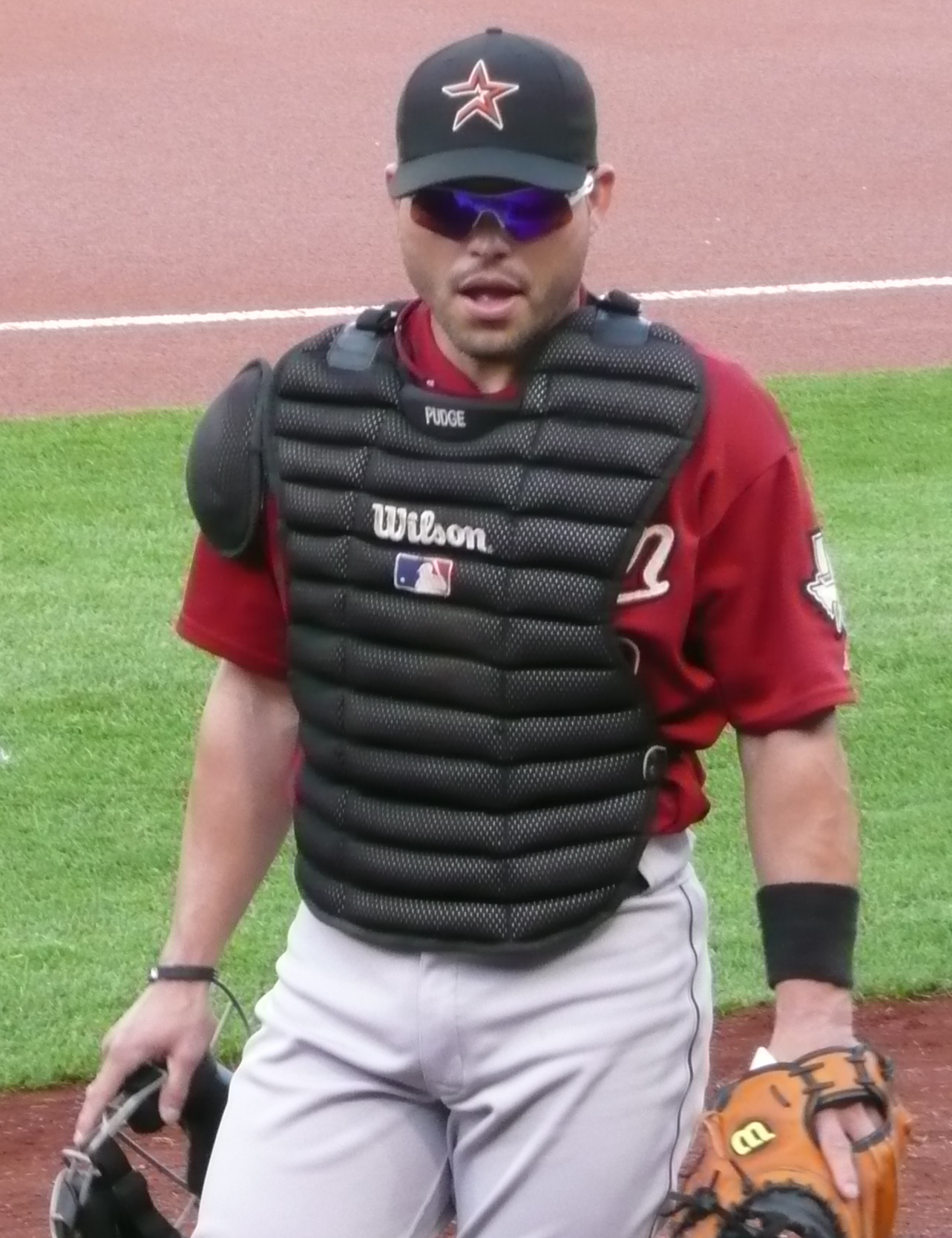
Iván Rodríguez has the most assists of any catcher since 1950.

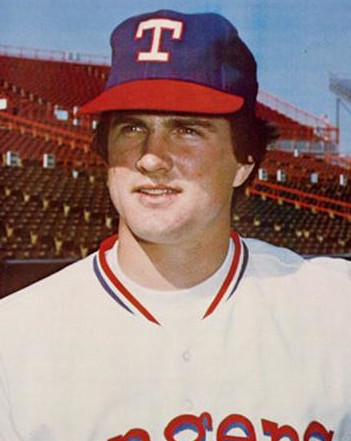
Jim Sundberg led the American League in assists a record six times.

- Stats updated as of 2026 season

Rank	Player (2027 As)	Assists as catcher			Other leagues, notes
Rank	Player (2027 As)	MLB	American League	National League	Other leagues, notes
1	Deacon McGuire	1,860	370	1,176	Includes 314 in American Association
2	Ray Schalk*	1,811	1,811	0	
3	Steve O'Neill	1,698	1,698	0	
4	Red Dooin	1,590	0	1,590	
5	Charles Zimmer	1,580	0	1,439	Includes 141 in American Association; held NL record, 1898-1911; held single-season record, 1890-1903
6	Johnny Kling	1,554	0	1,554	Held National League record, 1912-1915
7	Ivey Wingo	1,487	0	1,487	
8	Wilbert Robinson*	1,454	136	629	Includes 689 in American Association
9	Bill Bergen	1,444	0	1,444	Held National League record, 1911-1912
	Pop Snyder	1,444	0	566	Includes 713 in American Association, 149 in National Association, 16 in Players' League; held major league record, 1877-1901; held NL record, 1876-1883; held single-season record, 1876-1886
11	Wally Schang	1,420	1,420	0	
12	Duke Farrell	1,418	97	1,120	Includes 132 in Players' League, 69 in American Association
13	George Gibson	1,386	0	1,386	
14	Oscar Stanage	1,381	1,381	0	Held American League record, 1918-1922; holds AL single-season record
15	Malachi Kittridge	1,363	306	1,057	
16	Lou Criger	1,342	1,004	338	Held American League record, 1903-1907, 1908-1909; held AL single-season record, 1903-1908
17	Frank Snyder	1,332	0	1,332	
18	Bill Killefer	1,319	145	1,174	
19	Billy Sullivan	1,314	1,217	97	Held American League record, 1909–1918
20	Jack Warner	1,309	359	950	
21	Gabby Hartnett*	1,254	0	1,254	
22	Bill Rariden	1,231	0	778	Includes 453 in Federal League; holds the single-season record of 238 (set in 1915)
23	Iván Rodríguez*	1,227	1,066	161	
24	Gary Carter*	1,203	0	1,203	
25	Roger Bresnahan*	1,195	85	1,110	
26	Bob Boone	1,174	601	573	
27	Muddy Ruel	1,136	1,136	0	
28	Rick Ferrell*	1,127	1,127	0	
29	Al López*	1,115	28	1,087	
30	Hank Severeid	1,112	1,086	26	
31	Heinie Peitz	1,095	0	1,095	
32	Eddie Ainsmith	1,088	914	174	
33	Luke Sewell	1,084	1,084	0	
34	Jack Clements	1,082	0	1,050	Includes 32 in Union Association
35	Frank Bowerman	1,077	0	1,077	
36	Silver Flint	1,071	0	1,052	Includes 19 in National Association; held National League record, 1883-1898
37	Yadier Molina	1,062	0	1,062	
38	Otto Miller	1,053	0	1,053	
39	Charlie Bennett	1,048	0	1,048	
	Carlton Fisk*	1,048	1,048	0	
41	Tony Peña	1,045	332	713	
42	Cy Perkins	1,037	1,037	0	
43	Ed McFarland	1,024	338	686	
44	Buck Ewing*	1,017	0	910	Includes 107 in Players' League
45	Bill Holbert	1,013	588	425	
46	Jim Sundberg	1,007	966	41	
47	Doc Bushong	1,001	0	506	Includes 495 in American Association
48	Hank Gowdy	1,000	0	1,000	
49	Chief Meyers	996	0	996	
50	Pat Moran	990	0	990	Held single-season record, 1903-1914; holds NL single-season record
51	Jason Kendall	989	207	782	
52	Jack O'Connor	987	160	503	Includes 324 in American Association
53	Bob O'Farrell	980	0	980	
	Lance Parrish	980	826	154	
55	Jimmy Archer	979	16	963	
56	Ossee Schreckengost	969	858	111	Held American League record, 1907-1908
57	Benito Santiago	960	60	900	
58	Brad Ausmus	956	159	797	
59	Bill Dickey*	954	954	0	
60	Russell Martin	941	361	580	
61	Jimmie Wilson	931	0	931	
62	Ted Simmons*	915	144	771	
63	Larry McLean	905	0	905	
64	Rollie Hemsley	897	634	263	
65	Connie Mack*	864	0	724	Includes 140 in Players' League; held NL single-season record, 1888-1890
66	Joe Sugden	861	401	460	
67	Walter Schmidt	858	0	858	
68	King Kelly*	857	0	692	Includes 105 in American Association, 60 in the Players' League
69	Bill Carrigan	854	854	0	
70	Ed Sweeney	852	835	17	
71	Johnny Bench*	850	0	850	
72	Ernie Lombardi*	845	0	845	
73	Mickey Cochrane*	840	840	0	
74	Mike González	838	0	838	
75	John Henry	826	38	788	
76	Jocko Milligan	825	0	154	Includes 605 in American Association, 66 in the Players' League
77	A. J. Pierzynski	823	694	129	
78	Boileryard Clarke	806	337	469	
79	Gus Mancuso	803	0	803	
80	Yogi Berra*	798	797	1	
81	Art Wilson	796	1	487	Includes 308 in Federal League
82	Admiral Schlei	792	0	792	
83	Sam Agnew	773	773	0	
84	Rick Dempsey	768	677	91	
85	Pop Schriver	764	0	760	Includes 4 in American Association
86	Del Crandall	759	15	744	
87	Darrell Porter	754	505	249	
88	Zack Taylor	752	2	750	
89	Les Nunamaker	745	745	0	
90	Gabby Street	744	673	71	Held AL single-season record, 1909-1911
91	Thurman Munson	742	742	0	
92	Mike Scioscia	737	0	737	
93	Mike Piazza*	733	0	733	
94	Val Picinich	732	496	236	
95	Brian McCann	729	242	487	
96	Doc Powers	724	668	56	Held American League record, 1901-1903; held AL single-season record, 1901-1903
97	Bill Freehan	721	721	0	
98	Johnny Bassler	708	708	0	
99	Johnny Edwards	703	0	703	
100	John Grim	696	0	658	Includes 38 in American Association
	Jorge Posada	696	696	0	

=== First Basemen ===
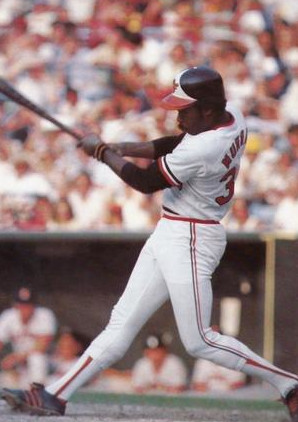
Eddie Murray, the all-time leader in assists by a first baseman.

First base, or 1B, is the first of four stations on a baseball diamond which must be touched in succession by a baserunner in order to score a run for that player's team. A first baseman is the player on the team playing defense who fields the area nearest first base and is responsible for the majority of plays made at that base. In the numbering system used to record defensive plays, the first baseman is assigned the number 3.

First basemen are most commonly credited with an assist when they field a ground ball and either throw the ball to the pitcher covering first base to retire the batter/runner or throw the ball to the shortstop covering the second base to force out a runner, perhaps beginning a double play. Other common ways in which first basemen gain an assist are by throwing out a runner attempting to reach third base or score, perhaps on a relay throw from the right fielder, throwing out a runner attempting to score on a squeeze play, rundown plays in which a runner is stranded between bases, throwing out a runner attempting to steal second base on a pickoff throw, and throwing to second base after catching a line drive to retire a runner before they can tag up. First basemen typically accumulate less than half as many assists as other infielders, partially because the ball is less frequently batted to the right side of the field, but also because in situations with a runner on first base, the first baseman will typically be stationed on or close to the bag to receiver a pickoff throw, reducing the area of the infield which they can easily cover. Because a right-handed first baseman needs to turn their body before throwing across the infield, left-handed first basemen are often preferred for defensive purposes; 10 of the top 14 career assist leaders are left-handed.

Eddie Murray is the all-time leader with 1,865 career assists. Only 60 first basemen have recorded 1,000 or more career assists, with Freddie Freeman and Paul Goldschmidt being the only active.

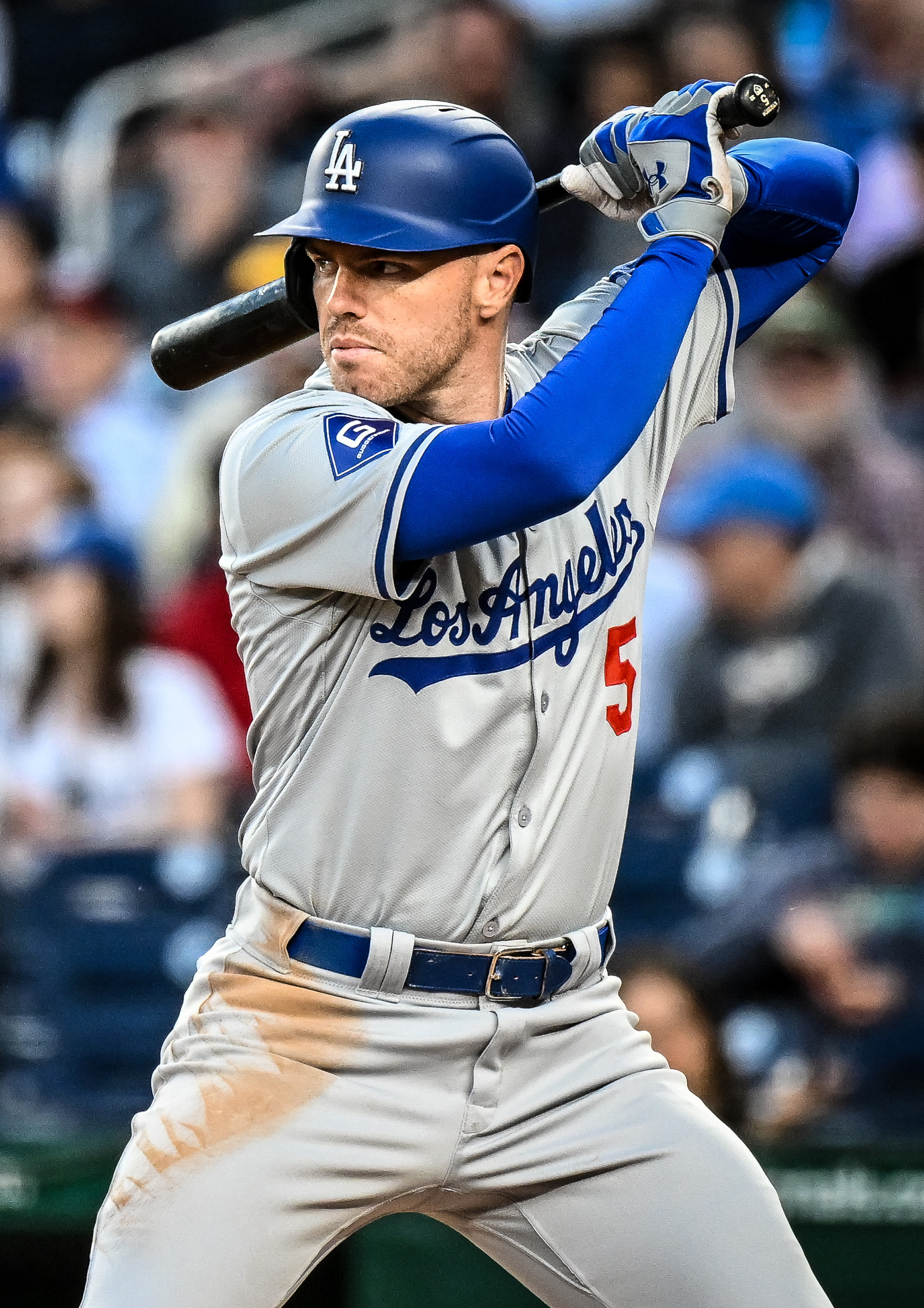
Freddie Freeman, the active leader and 15th all-time in assists by a first baseman.

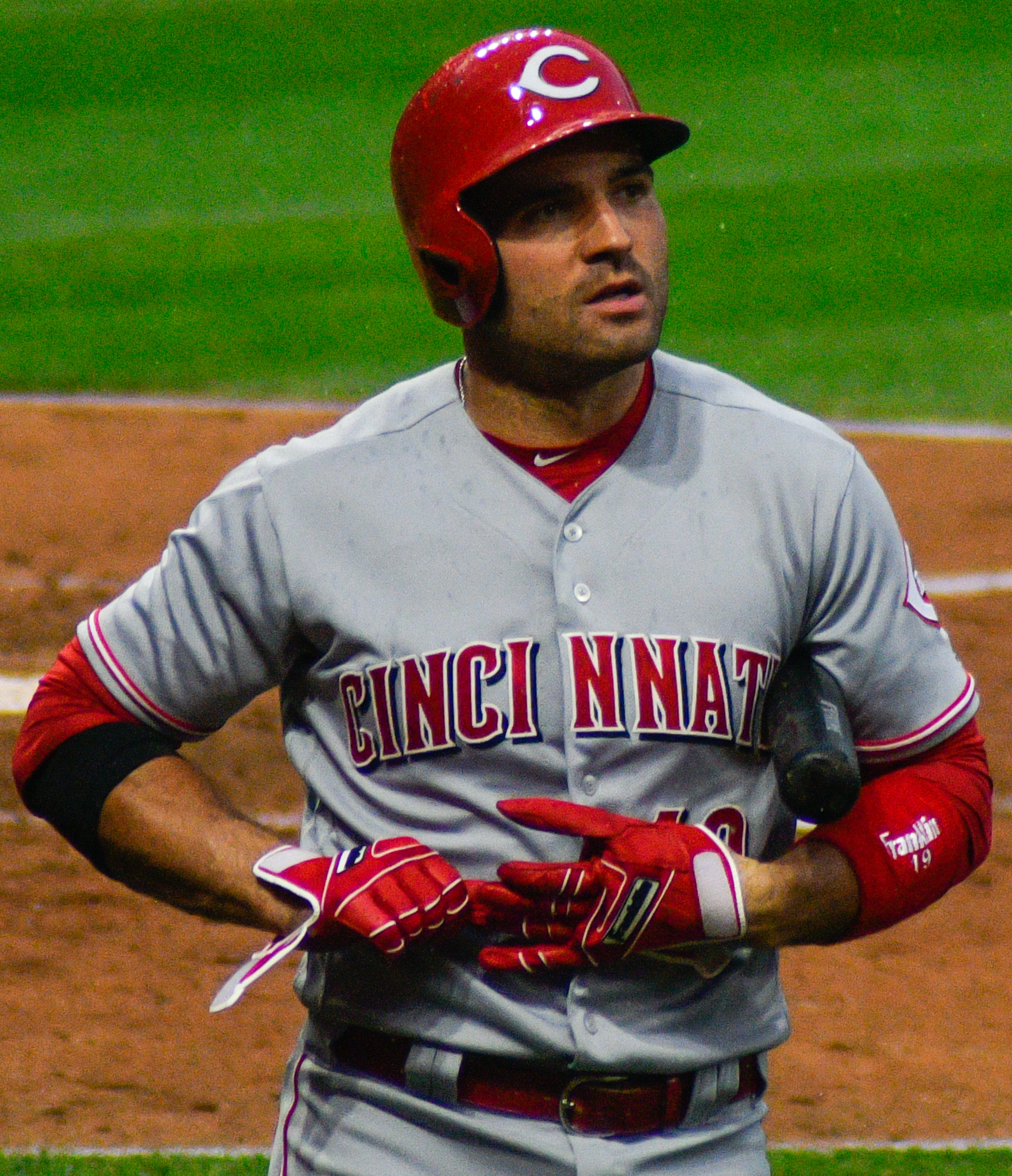
Joey Votto holds the National League career record.

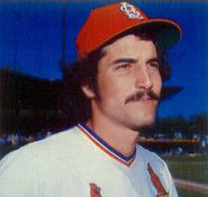
Keith Hernandez held the National League career record for 17 years.

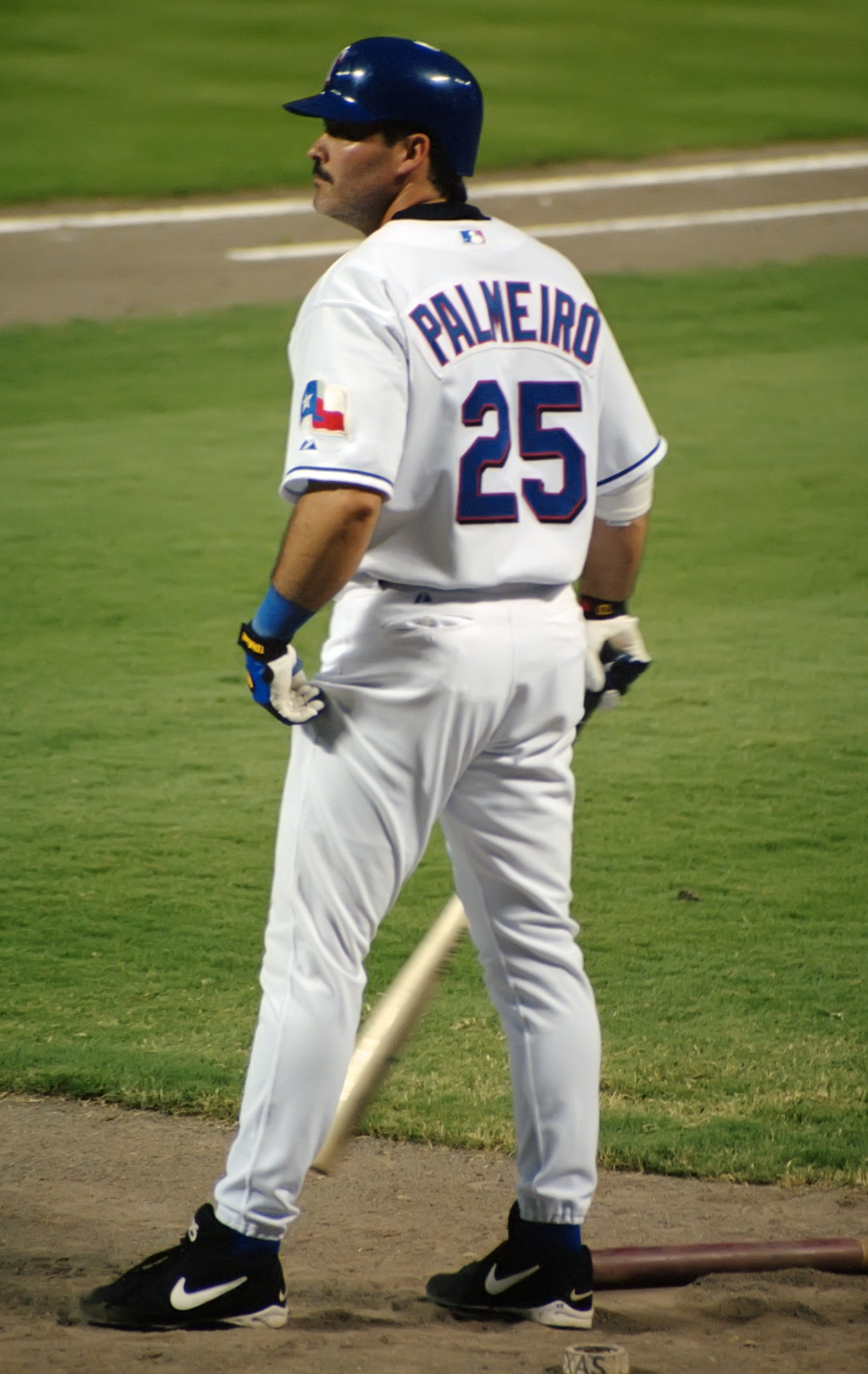
Rafael Palmeiro holds the American League career record.

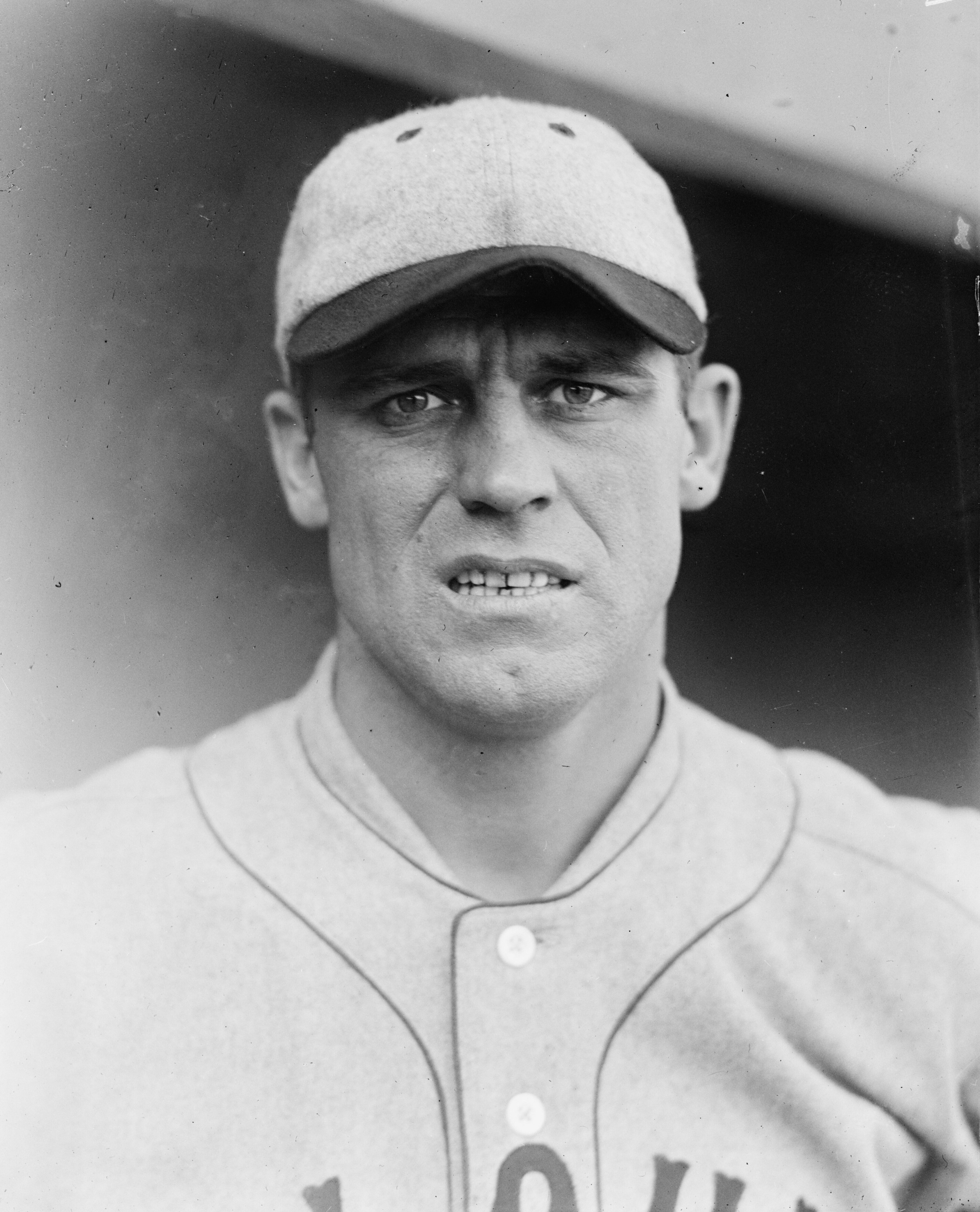
George Sisler held the major league career record for 58 years.

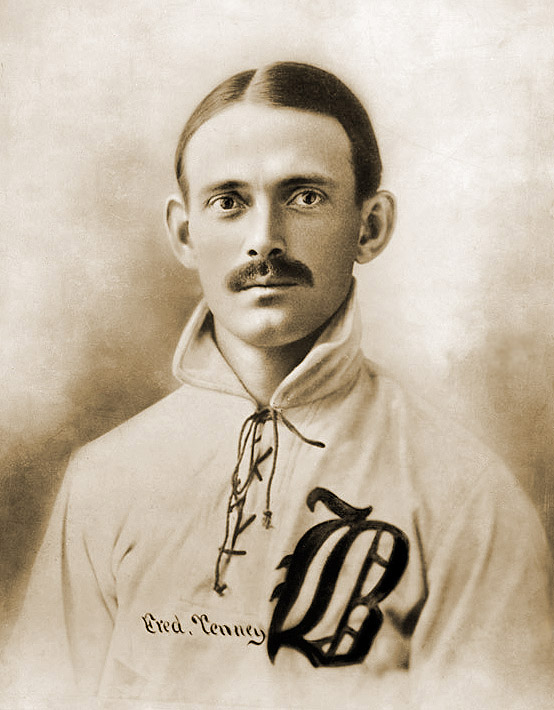
Fred Tenney held the National League's single-season and career records for 77 years each.

- Stats updated as of September 27, 2026.

Rank	Player (2026 As)	Assists as first baseman			Other leagues, notes
Rank	Player (2026 As)	MLB	American League	National League	Other leagues, notes
1	Eddie Murray*	1,865	1,280	585	
2	Joey Votto	1,758	0	1,758	
3	Todd Helton*	1,726	0	1,726	Held National League record, 2013-2022
4	Jeff Bagwell*	1,704	0	1,704	Held National League record, 2004-2013
5	Keith Hernandez	1,682	20	1,662	Held major league record, 1987–1992; held National League record, 1986-2003
6	Mark Grace	1,665	0	1,665	Held National League record, 2003–2004; held NL single-season record, 1990-2009
7	Albert Pujols	1,634	438	1,196	Holds the single-season record of 185 (set in 2009)
8	Rafael Palmeiro	1,587	1,574	13	
9	George Sisler*	1,529	1,251	278	Held major league record, 1929–1987; held American League record, 1924-1932
10	Wally Joyner	1,470	1,115	355	
11	Mickey Vernon	1,448	1,444	4	Held American League record, 1955–2004; held the single-season record, 1949–1982; held AL single-season record, 1949-1985
12	Fred McGriff*	1,447	654	793	
13	Anthony Rizzo	1,420	272	1,148	
14	John Olerud	1,418	1,077	341	
15	**Freddie Freeman (102)**	1,415	0	1,415	
16	**Paul Goldschmidt (46)**	1,400	130	1,270	
17	Adrian Gonzalez	1,391	241	1,150	
18	Andres Galarraga	1,376	17	1,359	
19	Derrek Lee	1,367	52	1,315	
20	Fred Tenney	1,363	0	1,363	Held major league record, 1911–1929; held National League record, 1909–1986; held single-season record, 1905–1949; held NL single-season record, 1905-1982
21	Eric Karros	1,359	17	1,342	
22	Bill Buckner	1,351	529	822	Held single-season record, 1982–2009; holds AL single-season record (184 in 1985); held NL single-season record, 1982-1986
	Chris Chambliss	1,351	828	523	
24	Norm Cash	1,317	1,317	0	
25	Jake Beckley*	1,316	0	1,258	Includes 58 in Players' League; held major league record, 1901–1911; held NL record, 1902–1909; held single-season record, 1891-1905
26	Joe Judge	1,301	1,284	17	Held American League record, 1932-1955
27	Will Clark	1,294	455	839	
28	Ed Konetchy	1,292	0	1,211	Includes 81 in Federal League
29	Gil Hodges*	1,281	0	1,281	
30	Stuffy McInnis	1,238	1,013	225	
31	Jimmie Foxx*	1,222	1,171	51	
	Willie McCovey*	1,222	0	1,222	
33	Charlie Grimm	1,214	0	1,214	
34	Joe Kuhel	1,163	1,163	0	
35	Tino Martinez	1,159	988	171	
36	Wally Pipp	1,152	954	198	
37	George Scott	1,132	1,132	0	
38	Jake Daubert	1,128	0	1,128	
39	Paul Konerko	1,111	1,090	21	
40	Bill Terry*	1,108	0	1,108	
40	Don Mattingly	1,104	1,104	0	
42	George Burns	1,094	1,094	0	
43	Lou Gehrig*	1,087	1,087	0	
44	Vic Power	1,078	1,067	11	
45	George McQuinn	1,074	1,047	27	
46	Carlos Delgado	1,064	723	341	
	Pete O'Brien	1,064	1,064	0	
48	Eric Hosmer	1,058	649	409	
49	Hal Chase	1,049	708	220	Includes 121 in Federal League
	Kent Hrbek	1,049	1,049	0	
51	Mark McGwire	1,042	775	267	
52	Johnny Mize*	1,032	103	929	
53	Steve Garvey	1,026	0	1,026	
54	Mike Hargrove	1,022	1,005	17	
55	Lu Blue	1,016	1,016	0	
	J. T. Snow	1,016	289	727	
57	Orlando Cepeda*	1,012	0	1,012	
58	Frank McCormick	1,001	0	1,001	
59	Cecil Cooper	1,000	1,000	0	
	Lyle Overbay	1,000	619	381	
61	Cap Anson*	983	0	955	Includes 28 in National Association; held major league record, 1884–1901; held NL record, 1885–1902; held the single-season record, 1881–1884, 1886–1888, 1889–1891; held NL single-season record, 1881–1888, 1889-1891
62	Elbie Fletcher	975	0	975	
63	Mark Teixeira	966	871	95	
64	Rudy York	963	963	0	Held AL single-season record, 1942-1949
65	Bill White	960	0	960	
66	Dolph Camilli	957	44	913	
67	Harry Davis	950	842	108	
68	Richie Sexson	944	473	471	
69	Tony Perez*	936	125	811	
70	Adam LaRoche	935	33	902	
71	Ferris Fain	927	927	0	
72	Justin Morneau	921	789	132	
73	Carlos Peña	906	818	88	
74	Bill Skowron	903	869	34	
75	Lee May	894	241	653	
76	**Carlos Santana (4)**	892	704	188	
77	Joe Adcock	879	174	705	
	**Matt Olson (108)**	879	324	555	
79	George Kelly*	861	0	861	
80	Boog Powell	859	859	0	
81	Roger Connor*	857	0	777	Includes 80 in the Players' League
82	Fred Merkle	847	1	846	
83	George Stovall	846	689	0	Includes 157 in Federal League
84	Fred Luderus	843	0	843	
85	Ryan Howard	828	0	828	
86	John Mayberry	827	777	50	
87	Donn Clendenon	819	0	819	
	Jason Thompson	819	419	400	
89	Jim Bottomley*	814	59	755	
	Earl Torgeson	814	194	620	
91	Ernie Banks*	809	0	809	
92	Ted Kluszewski	799	57	742	
	Willie Upshaw	799	799	0	
94	Dan McGann	798	41	757	
95	Jim Spencer	797	797	0	
96	Phil Cavarretta	796	17	779	
97	Brandon Belt	794	7	787	
98	Jack Fournier	788	213	575	
99	Sid Bream	786	0	786	Held NL single-season record, 1986-1990
100	Ed Kranepool	779	0	779	

=== Second Basemen ===
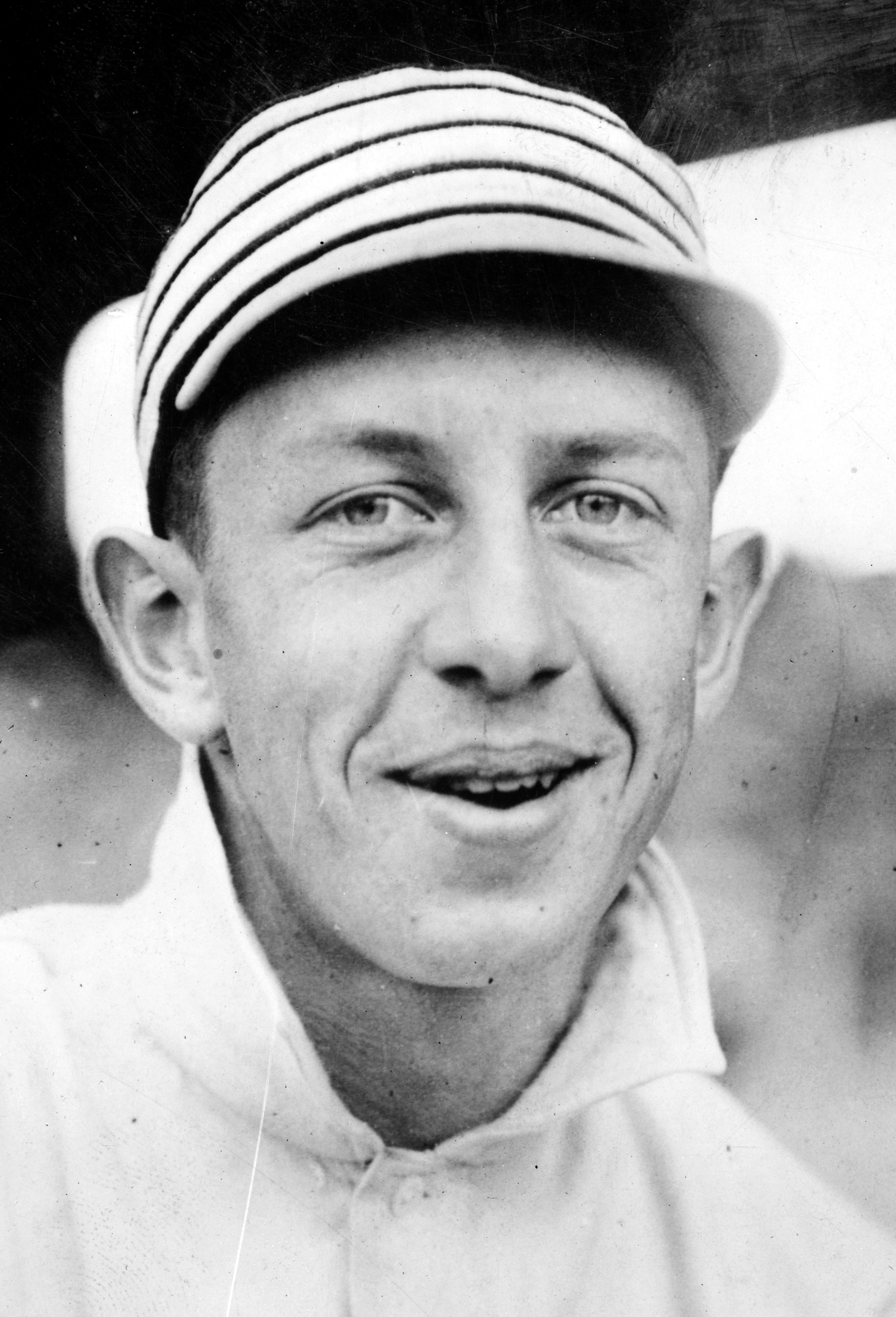
Eddie Collins, the all-time leader in assists by a second baseman.

In baseball and softball, the second baseman is a fielding position in the infield, commonly stationed between second and first base. The second baseman often possesses quick hands and feet, needs the ability to get rid of the ball quickly, and must be able to make the pivot on a double play. In addition, second basemen are almost always right-handed. Only four left-handed throwing players have appeared as second basemen in the major leagues since 1950; one of the four, Gonzalo Márquez, was listed as the second baseman in the starting lineup for two games in 1973, batting in the first inning, but was replaced before his team took the field on defense, and none of the other three players lasted even a complete inning at the position. In the numbering system used to record defensive plays, the second baseman is assigned the number 4.

Second basemen are most commonly credited with an assist when they field a ground ball and throw the ball either to the first baseman to retire the batter/runner or to the shortstop covering second base to force out a runner, perhaps beginning a double play. Other common ways in which second basemen gain an assist are by throwing out a runner attempting to reach third base or score, perhaps on a relay throw from the right fielder, rundown plays in which a runner is stranded between bases, throwing out a runner attempting to steal third base on a pickoff throw, and throwing to first or second base after catching a line drive in order to retire a runner before they can tag up. Second basemen and shortstops typically accumulate far more assists than players at other positions due to the frequency of ground balls to the middle infielders; the highest assist total in major league history was recorded by Frankie Frisch in 1927, with all but two of his 643 assists being gained at second base.

As strikeout totals have risen in baseball, the frequency of other defensive outs including ground outs has declined; as a result, assist totals for second basemen have likewise declined, and four of the top five career leaders began their careers prior to 1961. Through 2021, only six of the top 24 single-season totals have been recorded since 1938, only 13 of the top 64 since 1966, and only 14 of the top 192 since 1992. Eddie Collins is the all-time leader with 7,630 career assists; Charlie Gehringer (7,068) is the only other second baseman with over 7,000 career assists.

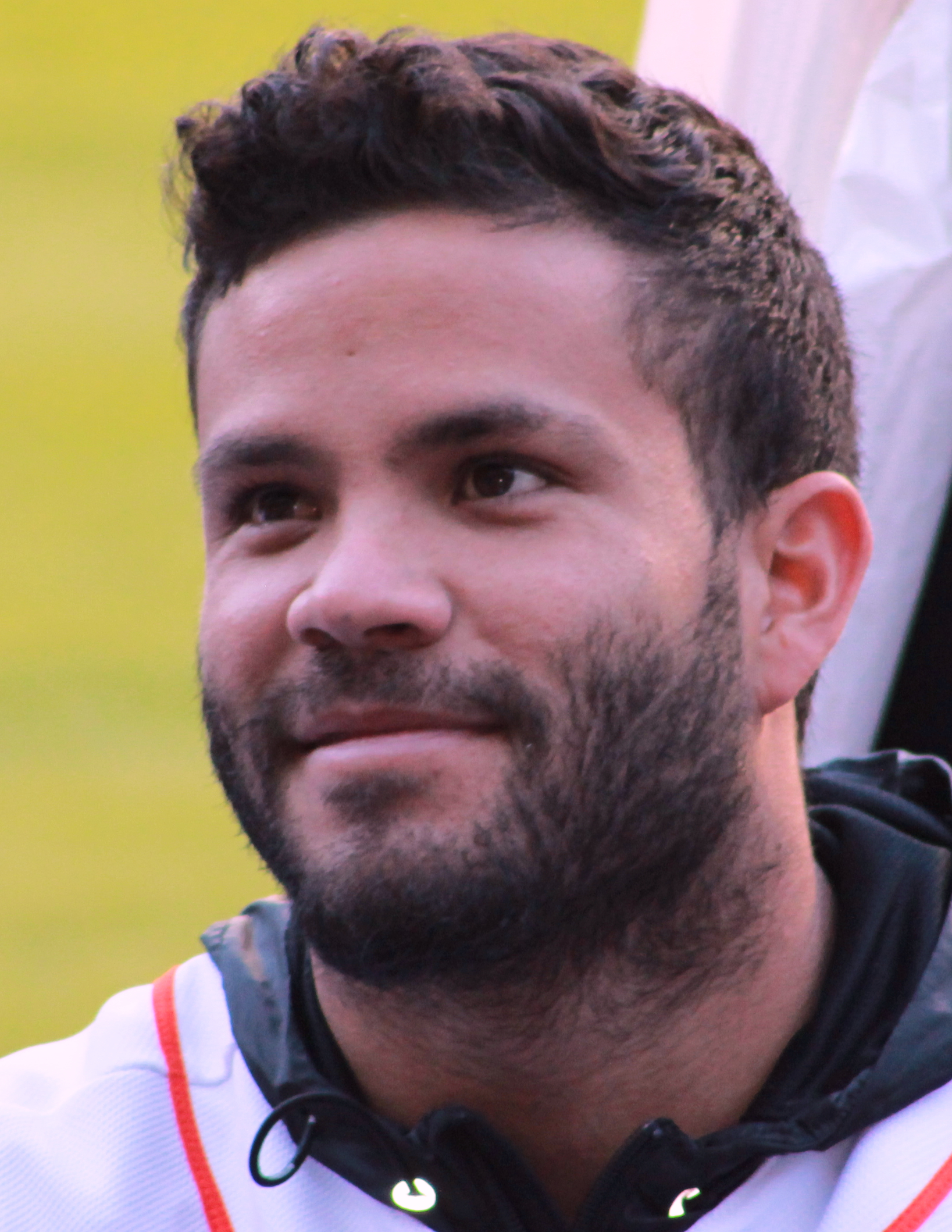
Jose Altuve, the active leader and 36th all-time in assists by a second baseman.

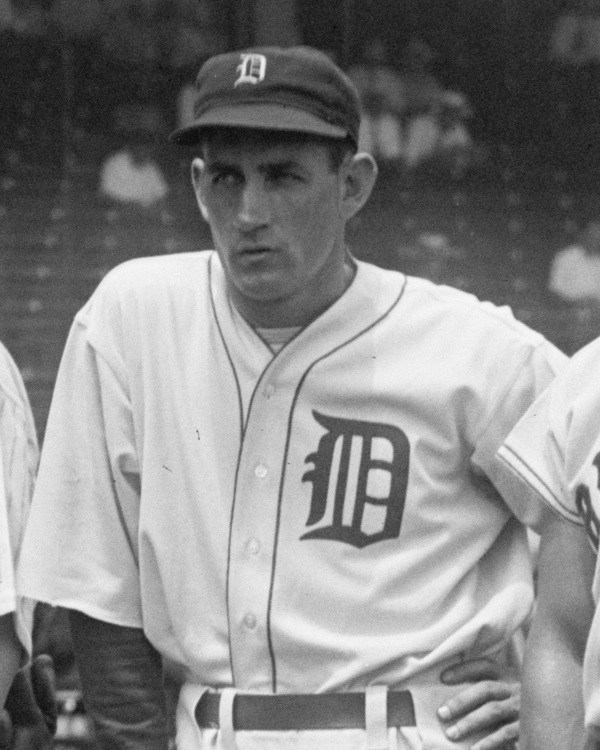
Charlie Gehringer led the American League in assists a record seven times.

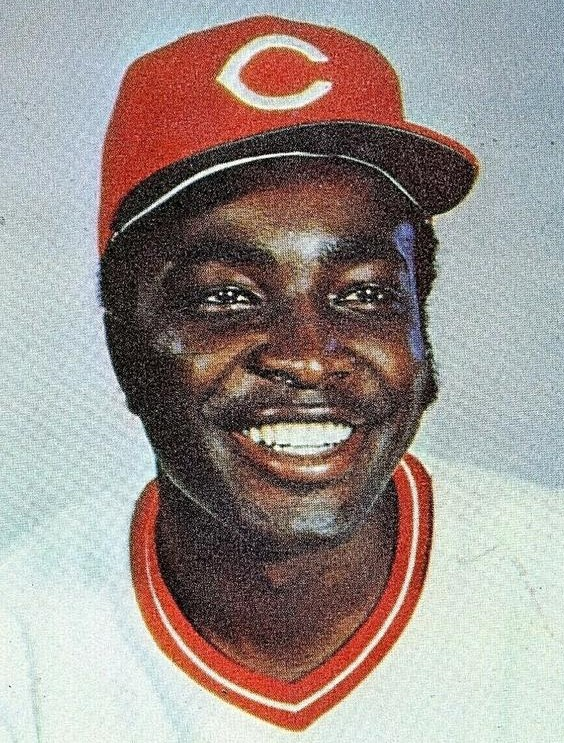
Joe Morgan holds the National League record.

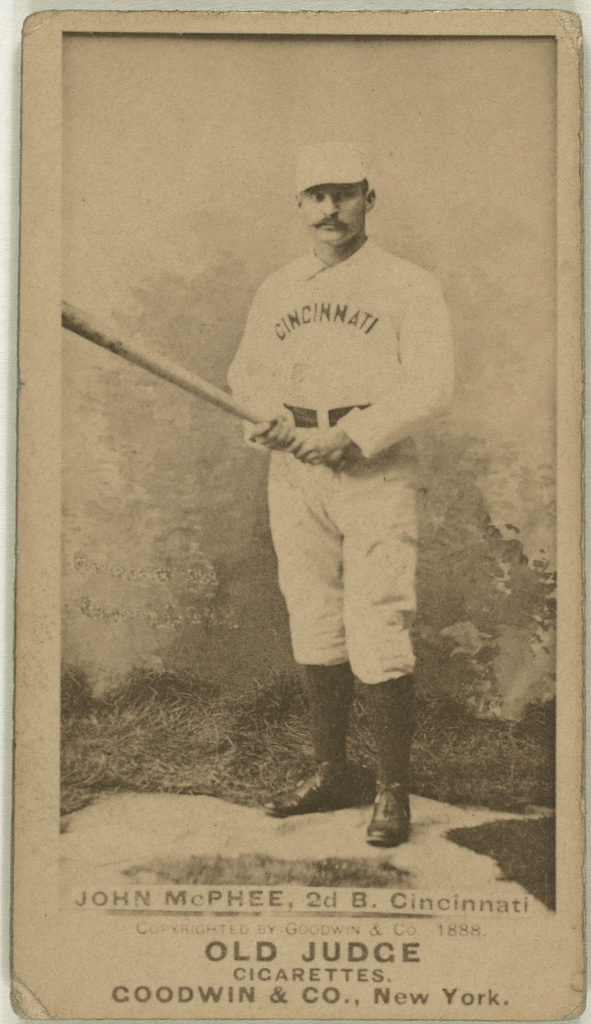
Bid McPhee held the major league record for 35 years.

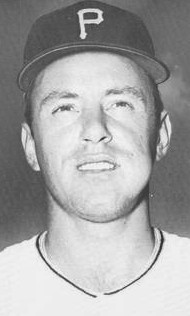
Bill Mazeroski led the major leagues in assists a record nine times.

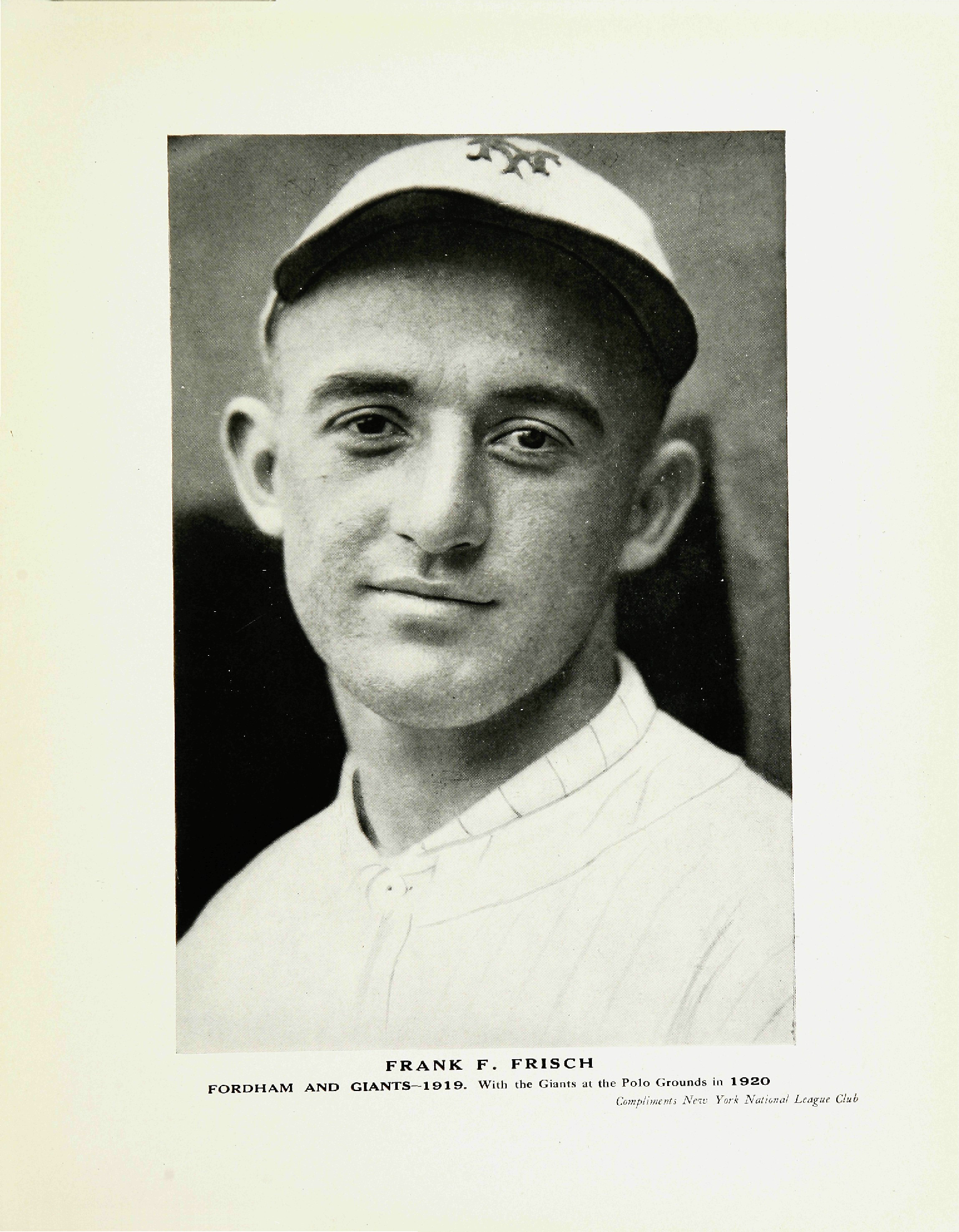
Frankie Frisch held the National League record for 36 years.

- Stats updated as of September 27, 2026.

Rank	Player (2026 As)	Assists as a second baseman			Other leagues, notes
Rank	Player (2026 As)	MLB	American League	National League	Other leagues, notes
1	Eddie Collins*	7,630	7,630	0	
2	Charlie Gehringer*	7,068	7,068	0	
3	Joe Morgan*	6,967	229	6,738	
4	Bid McPhee*	6,919	0	4,007	Includes 2,912 in American Association; held major league record, 1890-1925; held single-season record, 1886-1889, 1891-1892
5	Bill Mazeroski*	6,685	0	6,685	Held National League record, 1969-1983
6	Lou Whitaker	6,653	6,653	0	
7	Roberto Alomar*	6,524	4,629	1,895	
8	Nellie Fox*	6,373	6,054	319	
9	Ryne Sandberg*	6,363	0	6,363	
10	Willie Randolph	6,336	5,614	722	
11	Nap Lajoie*	6,267	5,284	983	Held American League record, 1910-1921; held AL single-season record, 1908-1930
12	Frank White	6,253	6,253	0	
13	Frankie Frisch*	6,026	0	6,026	Held National League record, 1933-1969; holds the single-season record of 641 (set in 1927)
14	Robinson Canó	5,876	5,586	290	
15	Bobby Doerr*	5,710	5,710	0	
16	Billy Herman*	5,681	0	5,681	
17	Jeff Kent*	5,575	67	5,508	
18	Craig Biggio*	5,448	0	5,448	
19	Bobby Grich	5,381	5,381	0	
20	Red Schoendienst *	5,243	0	5,243	
21	Ian Kinsler	5,219	5,064	155	
22	Rogers Hornsby*	5,166	43	5,123	
23	Hughie Critz	5,138	0	5,138	Held single-season record, 1926-1927
24	Johnny Evers*	5,124	3	5,121	Held National League record, 1915-1933
25	Fred Pfeffer	5,108	0	4,721	Includes 387 in Players' League; held National League record, 1891-1915; held single-season record, 1884-1886, 1889-1891; held NL single-season record, 1884-1887, 1888-1891
26	Del Pratt	5,075	5,075	0	
27	Ray Durham	4,926	3,130	1,796	
28	Brandon Phillips	4,925	432	4,493	
29	Steve Sax	4,805	1,773	3,032	
30	Kid Gleason	4,776	807	3,969	Held American League record, 1901-1902; held AL single-season record, 1901-1902
31	Joe Gordon*	4,706	4,706	0	
32	Manny Trillo	4,699	329	4,370	
33	Miller Huggins*	4,697	0	4,697	
34	Cupid Childs	4,679	0	4,312	Includes 367 in American Association
35	Larry Doyle	4,655	0	4,655	
36	**Jose Altuve (247)**	4,634	3,696	938	
37	Bret Boone	4,589	2,071	2,518	
38	Lou Bierbauer	4,563	0	2,483	Includes 1,612 in American Association, 468 in Players' League; held single-season record, 1892-1922
39	Chase Utley	4,535	0	4,535	
40	Luis Castillo	4,484	598	3,886	
41	Claude Ritchey	4,479	0	4,479	
42	George Cutshaw	4,473	540	3,933	
43	Ski Melillo	4,448	4,448	0	Holds the American League single-season record (572 in 1930)
44	Tony Lazzeri*	4,445	4,392	53	
45	Glenn Hubbard	4,444	399	4,045	
46	Jim Gantner	4,347	4,347	0	
47	Bobby Lowe	4,171	469	3,702	
48	Julián Javier	4,113	0	4,113	
49	Buddy Myer	4,068	4,068	0	
50	Frank Bolling	4,019	2,055	1,964	
51	Dustin Pedroia	4,004	4,004	0	
52	Tom Herr	3,999	195	3,804	
53	Harold Reynolds	3,932	3,932	0	
54	Mark Ellis	3,907	3,014	893	
55	Tony Cuccinello	3,891	10	3,881	
56	Max Bishop	3,850	3,850	0	
57	Félix Millán	3,846	0	3,846	
58	Bucky Harris*	3,842	3,842	0	
59	Dave Cash	3,841	0	3,841	
60	Johnny Ray	3,836	1,116	2,720	
61	Davey Lopes	3,829	651	3,178	
62	Chuck Knoblauch	3,821	3,821	0	
63	Joe Quinn	3,820	177	3,237	Includes 406 in Players' League
64	Cookie Rojas	3,819	2,099	1,720	
65	Tony Taylor	3,818	380	3,438	
66	Delino DeShields	3,817	503	3,314	
67	Orlando Hudson	3,809	1,879	1,930	
68	Ted Sizemore	3,761	107	3,654	
69	Brian Roberts	3,719	3,719	0	
70	Glenn Beckert	3,712	0	3,712	
71	Robby Thompson	3,704	0	3,704	
72	Bill Wambsganss	3,669	3,669	0	
73	Tito Fuentes	3,654	476	3,178	
74	Bill Doran	3,651	26	3,625	
75	Aaron Hill	3,620	2,284	1,336	
76	Adam Kennedy	3,600	2,861	739	
77	Eric Young	3,599	57	3,542	
78	Otto Knabe	3,583	0	2,930	Includes 653 in Federal League
79	Jerry Priddy	3,567	3,567	0	
80	Don Blasingame	3,550	902	2,648	
81	Ron Hunt	3,512	0	3,512	
82	Jimmy Williams	3,509	3,509	0	Held American League record, 1908-1910; held AL single-season record, 1904-1908
83	Dan Uggla	3,472	0	3,472	
84	Bobby Richardson	3,445	3,445	0	
85	Julio Cruz	3,435	3,435	0	
86	Bill Hallman	3,399	0	2,954	Includes 399 in American Association, 46 in Players' League
87	Mark McLemore	3,392	3,338	54	
88	Cub Stricker	3,387	0	855	Includes 2,179 in American Association, 353 in Players' League
89	Johnny Temple	3,329	650	2,679	
90	Jack Burdock	3,322	0	2,745	Includes 354 in National Association, 223 in American Association; held major league record, 1879-1890; held NL record, 1877-1889
91	Damion Easley	3,321	2,880	441	
92	Jerry Remy	3,241	3,241	0	
93	Ronnie Belliard	3,237	1,092	2,145	
	Tommy Helms	3,237	3	3,234	
95	Juan Samuel	3,228	73	3,155	
96	Bobby Knoop	3,218	3,218	0	
97	**DJ LeMahieu (0)**	3,217	585	2,632	
98	Eddie Stanky	3,215	0	3,215	
99	Mickey Morandini	3,202	92	3,110	
100	Howie Kendrick	3,197	2,696	501	
	Ron Oester	3,197	0	3,197	

=== Third Basemen ===
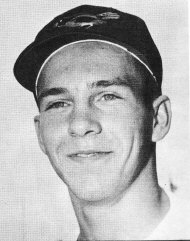
Brooks Robinson, the all-time leader in career assists by a third baseman.

Third base, or 3B, is the third of four stations on a baseball diamond which must be touched in succession by a baserunner in order to score a run for that player's team. A third baseman is the player on the team playing defense who fields the area nearest third base and is responsible for the majority of plays made at that base. In the scoring system used to record defensive plays, the third baseman is assigned the number 5. The third baseman requires good reflexes in reacting to batted balls, often being the closest infielder (roughly 90–120 feet) to the batter. The third base position requires a strong and accurate arm, as the third baseman often makes long throws to first base. The third baseman sometimes must throw quickly to second base in time to start a double play, and must also field fly balls in both fair and foul territory.

Third basemen are most commonly credited with an assist when they field a ground ball and throw the ball either to the first baseman to retire the batter/runner or to the second baseman to force out a runner, perhaps beginning a double play. Other common ways in which third basemen gain an assist are by throwing out a runner attempting to score (perhaps on a squeeze play), perhaps on a relay throw from the left fielder, rundown plays in which a runner is stranded between bases, throwing out a runner attempting to steal home on a pickoff throw, and throwing to first or second base after catching a line drive in order to retire a runner before they can tag up. Third basemen typically accumulate fewer assists than second basemen or shortstops due to the frequency of ground balls to the middle infielders, but far more than players at other positions.

Because the physical demands of playing third base historically hindered players from having long careers at the position, all but three of the 25 third basemen with the longest careers have reached the major leagues since 1943; even as increasing strikeouts in baseball have reduced the frequency of other defensive outs including ground outs, longer seasons and careers in recent decades have more than compensated for the difference. The top 15 leaders in career assists at third base all reached the major leagues after 1950, and all but nine of the top 62 single-season totals have been recorded since 1957. Brooks Robinson is the all-time leader in career assists as a third baseman with 6,205, which was 1,624 more than any other player at the time of his retirement; he remains the only third baseman with more than 6,000 career assists.

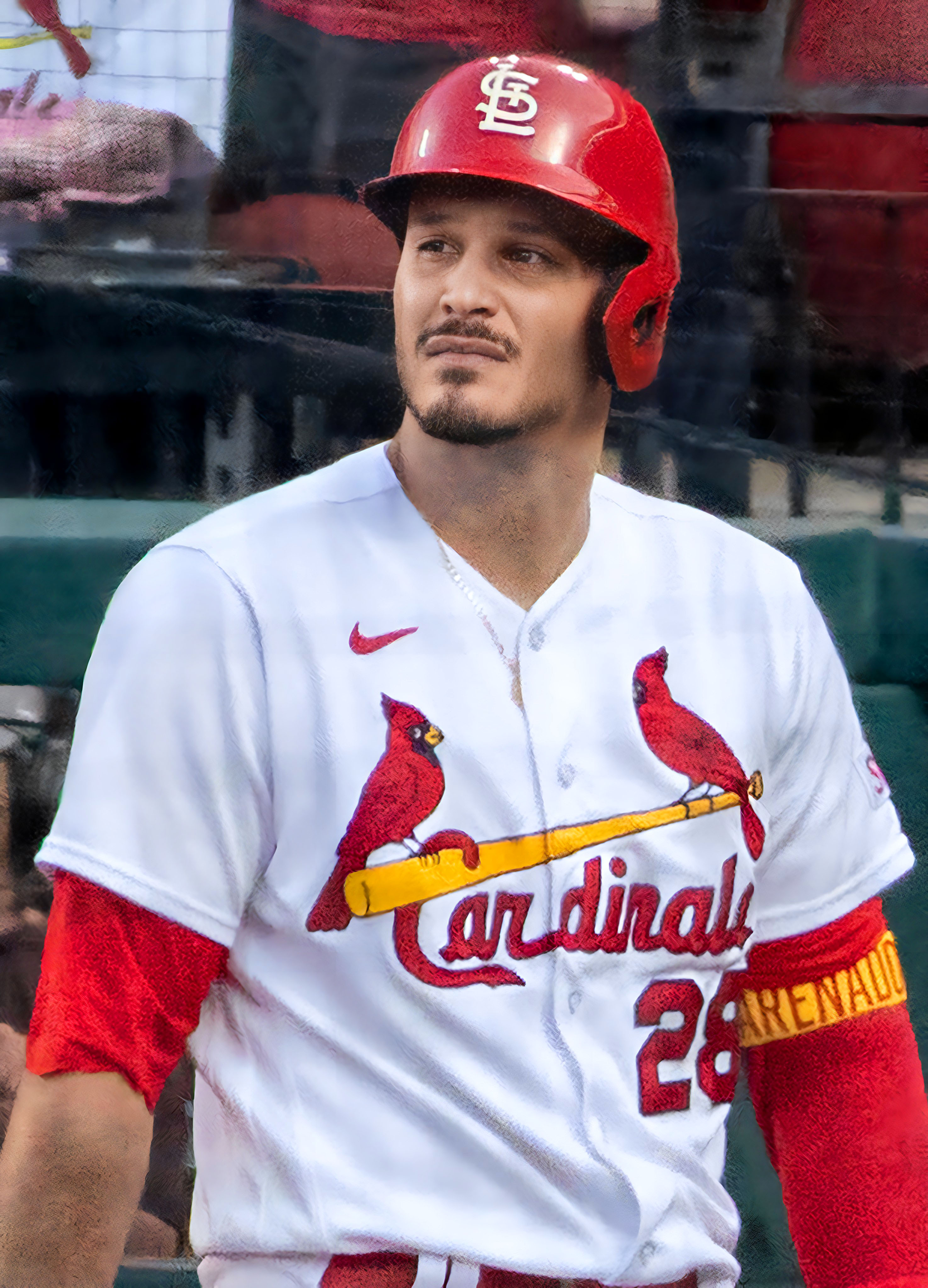
Nolan Arenaldo, the active leader in assists as a third baseman and 14th all-time.

Graig Nettles' 412 assists in 1971 are the most by a third baseman.

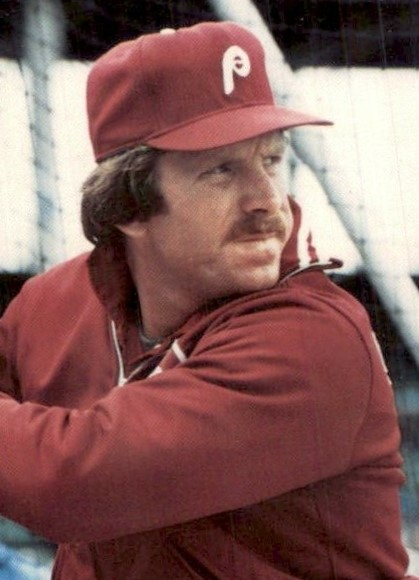
Mike Schmidt holds the National League's career and single-season records.

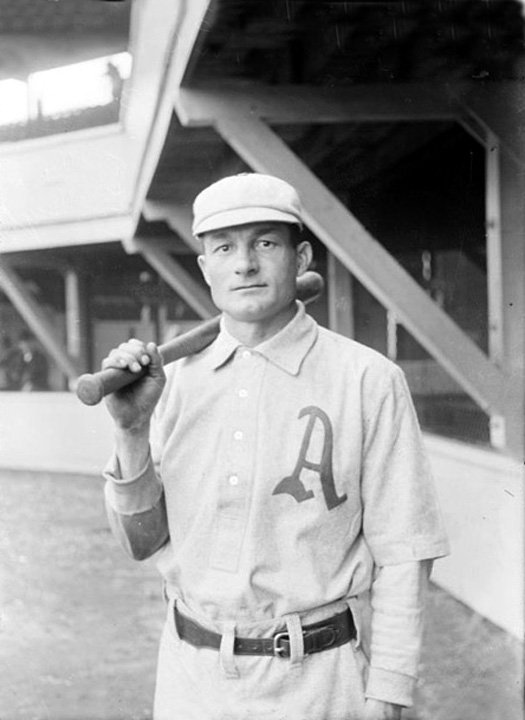
Lave Cross held the major league record for 59 years.

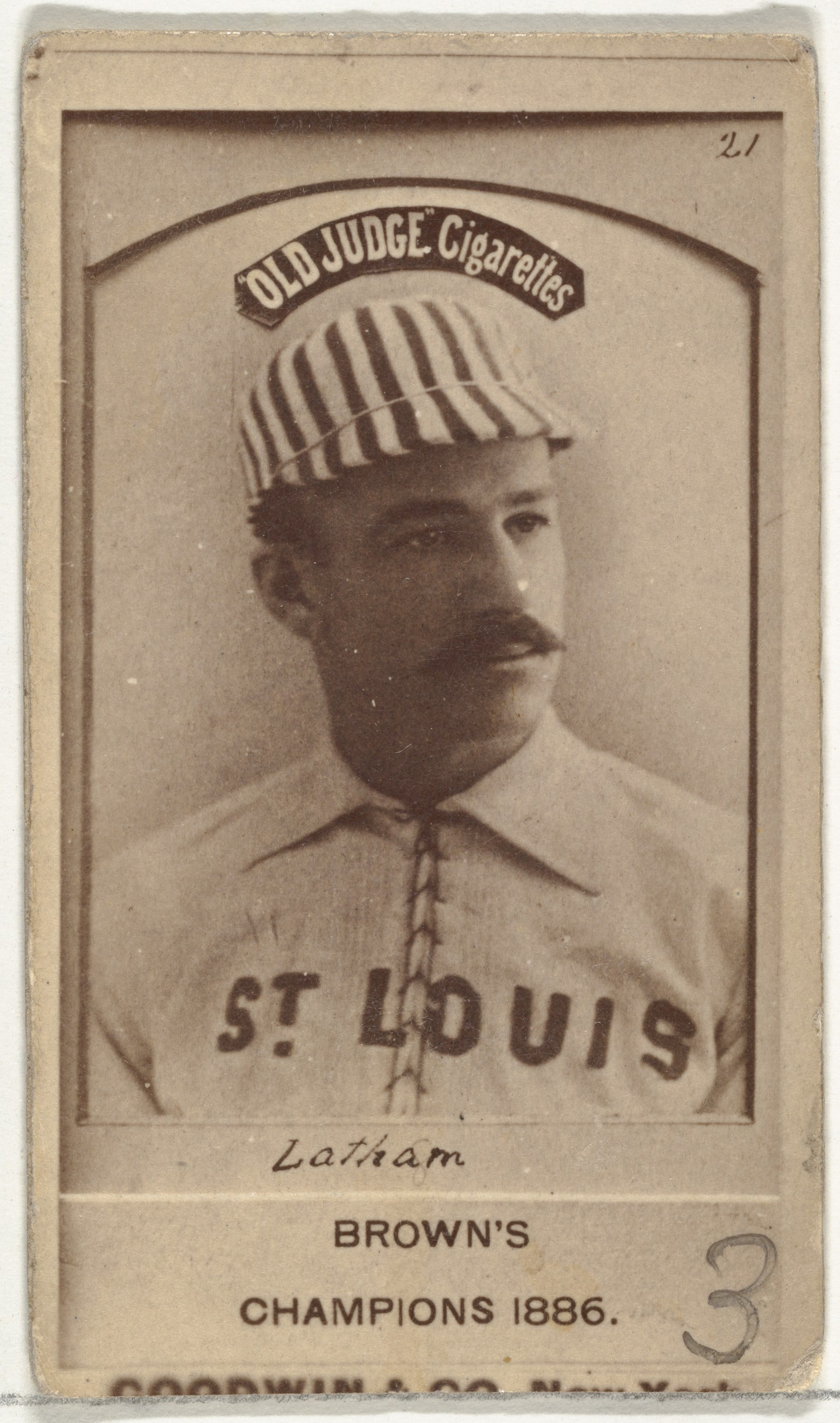
Arlie Latham held the major league record for 15 years.

Pie Traynor held the National League record for 32 years.

- Stats updated as of September 27, 2026.

Rank	Player (2026 As)	Assists as third baseman			Other leagues, notes
Rank	Player (2026 As)	MLB	American League	National League	Other leagues, notes
1	Brooks Robinson*	6,205	6,205	0	Held the single-season record, 1967-1971 (tie)
2	Graig Nettles	5,279	4,616	663	Holds the single-season record of 412 (set in 1971)
3	Adrián Beltré*	5,182	3,365	1,817	
4	Mike Schmidt*	5,045	0	5,045	Holds the National League single-season record (404 in 1974)
5	Buddy Bell	4,925	4,151	774	
6	Ron Santo*	4,581	49	4,532	Held National League record, 1973-1987; held NL single-season record, 1966-1974
7	Gary Gaetti	4,531	3,703	828	
8	Eddie Mathews*	4,322	38	4,284	Held major league record, 1965-1971; held National League record, 1964-1973
9	Wade Boggs*	4,246	4,246	0	
10	Aurelio Rodriguez	4,150	4,022	128	
11	Scott Rolen*	4,081	385	3,696	
12	Ron Cey	4,018	3	4,015	
13	Tim Wallach	3,992	85	3,907	
14	**Nolan Arenado (216)**	3,966	0	3,966	
15	Terry Pendleton	3,891	33	3,858	
16	Sal Bando	3,720	3,720	0	
17	Lave Cross	3,715	1,609	2,057	Includes 49 in American Association; held major league record, 1906-1965
18	Jimmy Collins*	3,702	1,974	1,728	Held American League record, 1901-1902; held AL single-season record, 1901-1902
19	George Brett*	3,674	3,674	0	
20	Eddie Yost	3,659	3,659	0	Held American League record, 1960-1969
21	Ken Boyer	3,652	74	3,578	
22	Aramis Ramírez	3,627	0	3,627	
23	Robin Ventura	3,552	2,695	857	
24	Arlie Latham	3,546	0	1,544	Includes 1,883 in American Association, 119 in Players' League; held major league record, 1891-1906; held single-season record, 1884-1886, 1891-1892; held NL single-season record, 1891-1892
25	Pie Traynor*	3,521	0	3,521	Held National League record, 1932-1964
26	Stan Hack	3,494	0	3,494	
27	Chipper Jones*	3,447	0	3,447	
28	Larry Gardner	3,408	3,408	0	Held American League record, 1921-1960
29	Matt Williams	3,376	301	3,075	
30	Willie Kamm	3,345	3,345	0	
31	George Kell*	3,303	3,303	0	
32	Evan Longoria	3,297	2,440	857	
33	Harlond Clift	3,262	3,262	0	Held the single-season record, 1937-1971
34	Vinny Castilla	3,261	230	3,031	
35	Pinky Higgins	3,258	3,258	0	
36	Clete Boyer	3,218	2,193	1,025	
37	Doug DeCinces	3,215	3,208	7	
38	Home Run Baker*	3,155	3,155	0	Held American League record, 1918-1920
39	Ken Caminiti	3,127	99	3,028	
40	Darrell Evans	3,123	38	3,085	
41	Billy Nash	3,122	0	2,728	Includes 307 in Players' League, 87 in American Association; held National League record, 1895-1910
42	**Manny Machado (202)**	3,072	1,478	1,594	
43	Ken Keltner	3,070	3,070	0	
44	Ossie Bluege	3,040	3,040	0	
45	Jimmy Austin	2,949	2,949	0	Held American League record, 1920-1921
46	David Wright	2,946	0	2,946	
47	Bill Bradley	2,943	2,489	359	Includes 95 in Federal League; held American League record, 1903-1918
48	Willie Jones	2,934	10	2,924	
49	Kyle Seager	2,930	2,930	0	
50	Billy Shindle	2,891	0	2,226	Includes 663 in American Association, 2 in Players' League; held single-season record, 1888-1890, 1892-1916; held NL single-season record, 1892-1966
51	Doug Rader	2,887	103	2,784	
52	Frank Malzone	2,884	2,884	0	
53	Harry Steinfeldt	2,805	0	2,805	Held National League record, 1910-1932
54	Carney Lansford	2,799	2,799	0	
55	Bob Elliott	2,744	197	2,547	
56	Eric Chavez	2,732	2,618	114	
57	Ken McMullen	2,731	2,523	208	
58	Todd Zeile	2,724	490	2,234	
59	Mike Lowell	2,688	980	1,708	
60	Pinky Whitney	2,640	0	2,640	
61	Heinie Groh	2,554	0	2,554	
62	Bill Madlock	2,546	33	2,513	
63	Jeff Cirillo	2,545	1,124	1,421	
64	Travis Fryman	2,530	2,530	0	
65	Milt Stock	2,508	0	2,508	
66	Troy Glaus	2,505	1,909	596	
67	Joe Randa	2,489	1,947	542	
68	Art Devlin	2,481	0	2,481	
69	Charlie Hayes	2,480	447	2,033	
70	Ken Reitz	2,477	0	2,477	
71	Billy Werber	2,415	1,337	1,078	
72	Jimmy Dykes	2,403	2,403	0	
73	**Eugenio Suárez (65)**	2,400	575	1,825	
74	Eddie Foster	2,384	2,384	0	
75	**Matt Chapman (172)**	2,378	1,692	686	
76	Mike Mowrey	2,363	0	2,095	Includes 268 in Federal League
77	Richie Hebner	2,346	49	2,297	
78	Jerry Denny	2,338	0	2,338	Held major league record, 1890-1891; held National League record, 1888-1895; held NL single-season record, 1886-1887
79	Josh Donaldson	2,336	2,001	335	
80	Don Hoak	2,331	0	2,331	
81	Steve Buechele	2,281	1,506	775	
82	Bob Bailey	2,262	2	2,260	
83	Bobby Byrne	2,221	0	2,221	
84	**Alex Bregman (250)**	2,203	1,952	250	
85	Brandon Inge	2,189	2,164	25	
86	Doc Casey	2,184	633	1,551	Held American League record, 1902-1903
87	Ryan Zimmerman	2,181	0	2,181	
88	Red Smith	2,136	0	2,136	
89	Denny Lyons	2,130	0	929	Includes 1,201 in American Association
90	Red Rolfe	2,128	2,128	0	
91	Tommy Leach	2,127	0	2,127	
92	Mike Pagliarulo	2,119	1,836	283	
93	**José Ramírez (159)**	2,106	2,106	0	
94	Chase Headley	2,078	865	1,213	
95	Alex Rodriguez	2,076	2,076	0	
96	Don Money	2,061	1,379	682	
97	Brook Jacoby	2,058	2,052	6	
98	Mike Moustakas	2,046	1,694	352	
99	Bill Melton	2,045	2,045	0	
100	George Pinkney	2,042	0	923	Includes 1,119 in American Association

=== Shortstop ===
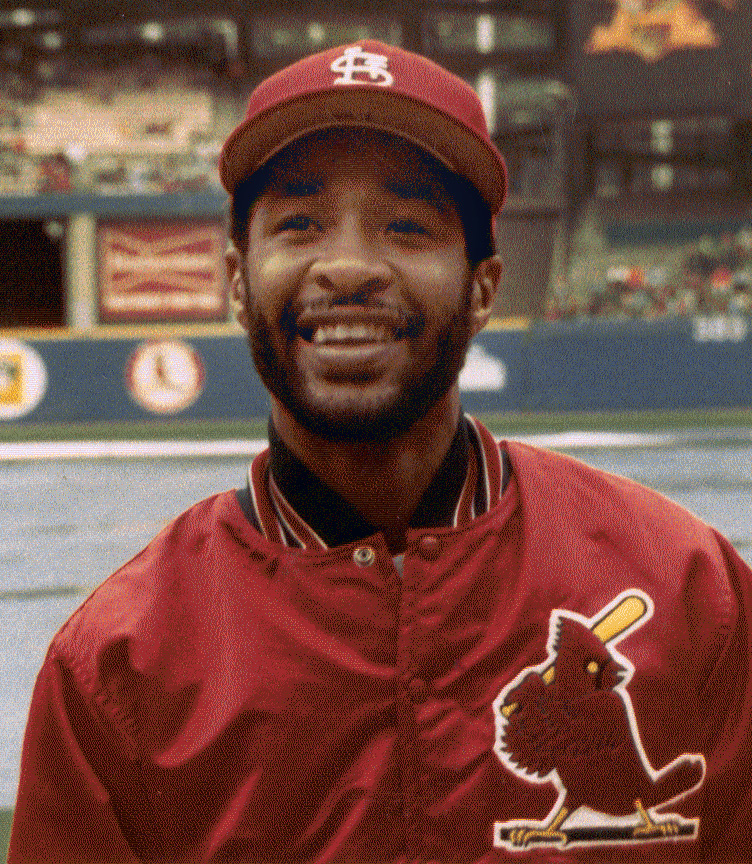
Ozzie Smith, the all-time leader in assists by a shortstop.

Shortstop, abbreviated SS, is a baseball or softball fielding position in the infield, commonly stationed between second and third base, which is considered to be among the most demanding defensive positions. Defensive specialists mostly fill the position, so shortstops are generally relatively poor batters who typically hit lower in the batting order. In the numbering system used to record defensive plays, the shortstop is assigned the number 6.

Shortstops are most commonly credited with an assist when they field a ground ball and throw the ball either to the first baseman to retire the batter/runner, or to the second baseman or third baseman to force out a runner, perhaps beginning a double play. Other common ways in which shortstops gain an assist are by throwing out a runner attempting to score, perhaps on a relay throw from the left fielder, rundown plays in which a runner is stranded between bases, throwing out a runner attempting to steal third base on a pickoff throw, and throwing to second or third base after catching a line drive in order to retire a runner before they can tag up. Second basemen and shortstops typically accumulate far more assists than players at other positions due to the frequency of ground balls to the middle infielders; the top six major league players in career assists were all primarily shortstops, and 7,354 of Rabbit Maranville's record 8,967 career assists were earned as a shortstop.

As strikeout totals have risen in baseball, the frequency of other defensive outs including groundouts has declined; as a result, assist totals for shortstops have likewise declined, and only two of the top seven career leaders have been active since 1973. Through 2022, none of the top 21 single-season totals have been recorded since 1988, and only five of the top 120 since 1993. Ozzie Smith is the all-time leader in career assists as a shortstop with 8,375, the most by any player in major league history at any single position. Luis Aparicio (8,016) is the only other shortstop to record more than 8,000 career assists.

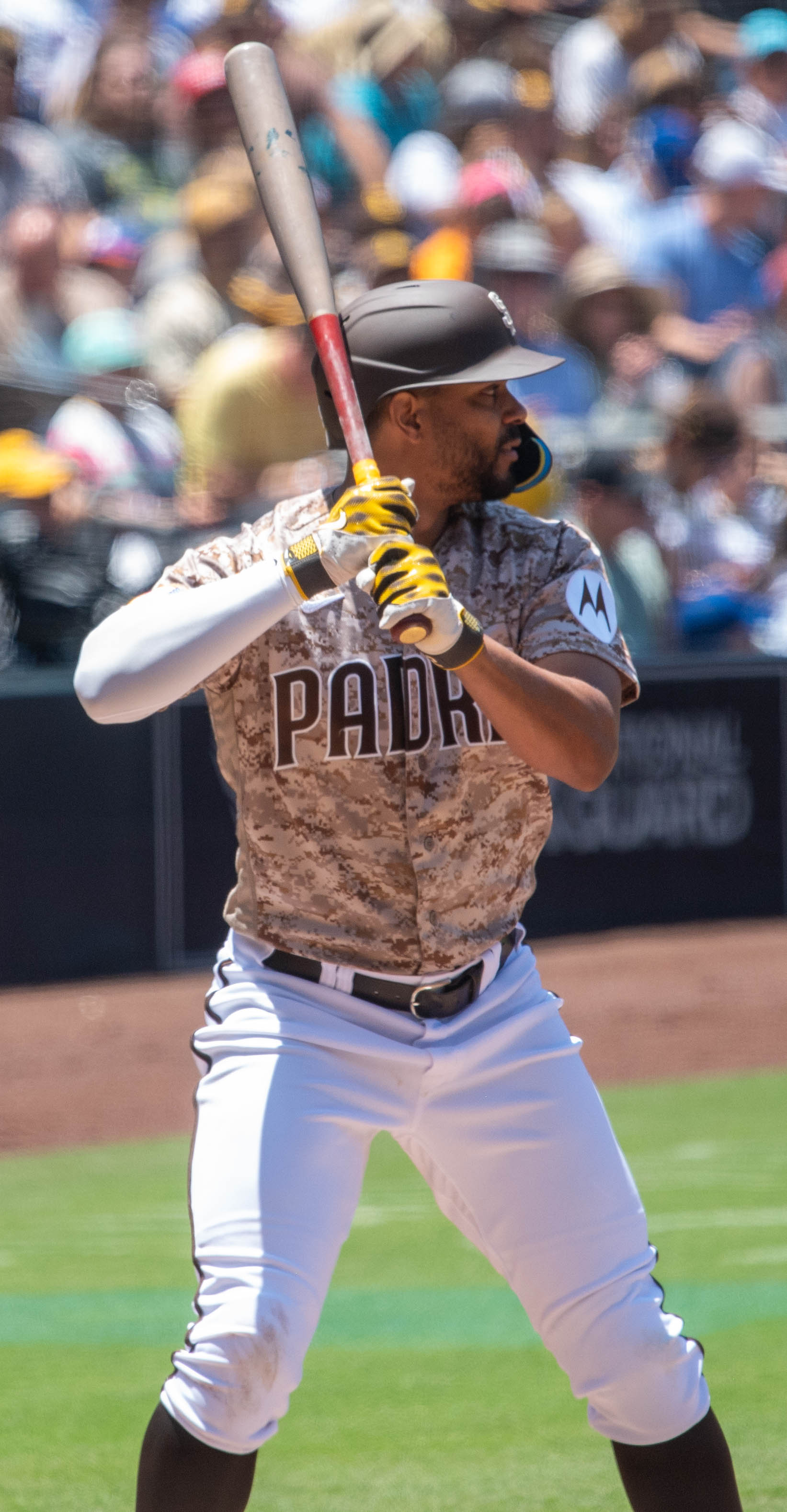
Xander Bogaerts, the active leader in assists by a shortstop and 86th all-time.

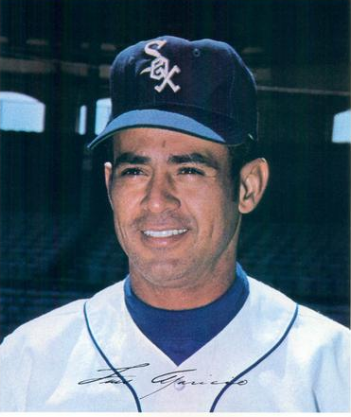
Luis Aparicio holds the American League record.

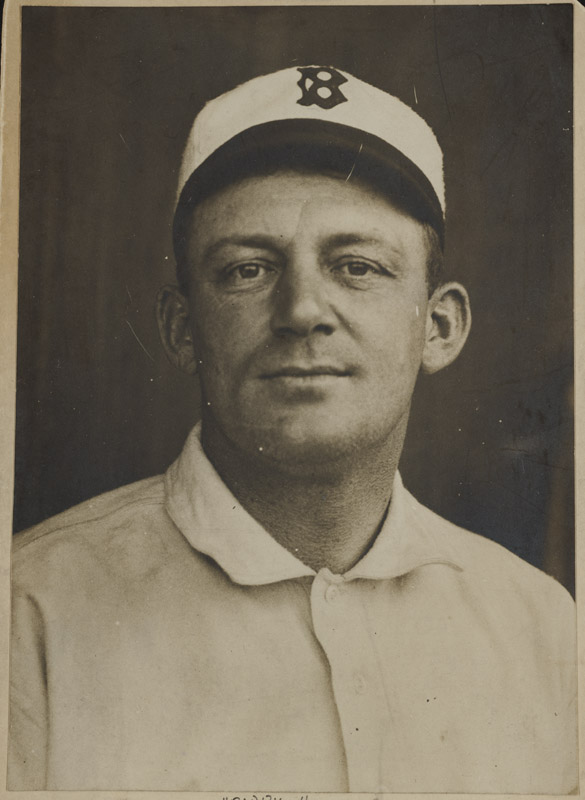
Bill Dahlen held the major league record for 64 years.

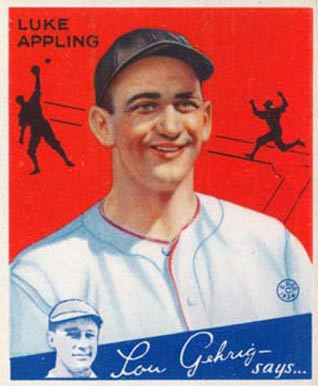
Luke Appling held the American League record for 24 years.

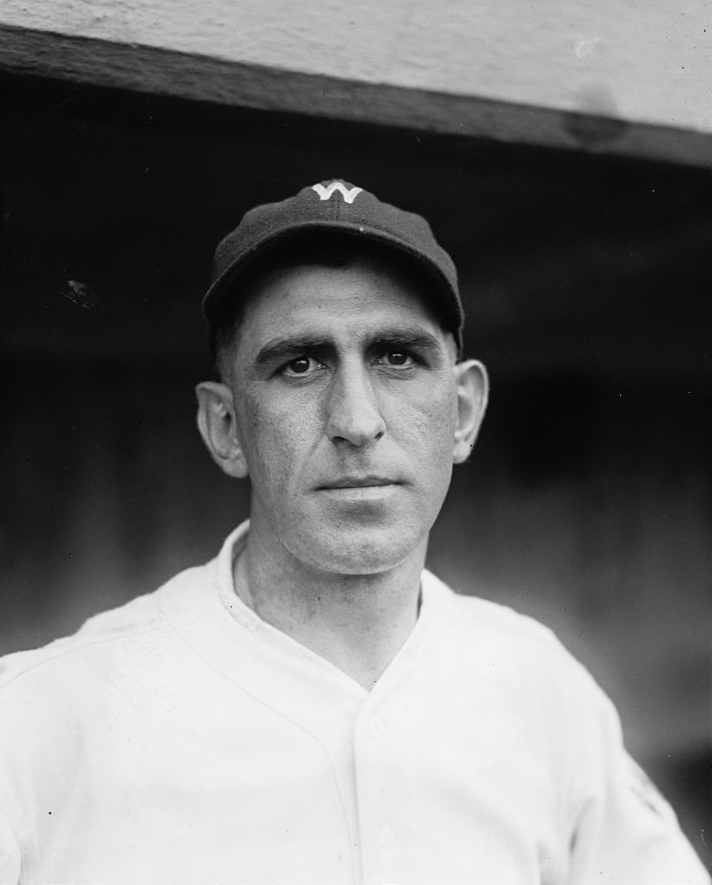
Roger Peckinpaugh held the American League record for 21 years.

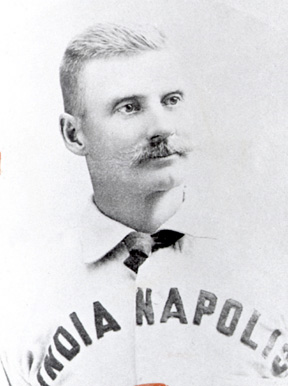
Jack Glasscock held the National League record for 20 years.

- Stats updated as of September 27, 2026.

Rank	Player (2026 As)	Assists as a shortstop			Other leagues, notes
Rank	Player (2026 As)	MLB	American League	National League	Other leagues, notes
1	Ozzie Smith*	8,375	0	8,375	Holds the single-season record of 621 (set in 1980)
2	Luis Aparicio*	8,016	8,016	0	Held major league record, 1972-1994
3	Omar Vizquel	7,676	6,237	1,439	
4	Bill Dahlen	7,505	0	7,505	Held major league record, 1908-1972; held National League record, 1905-1993
5	Rabbit Maranville*	7,354	0	7,354	Held single-season record, 1914-1920
6	Luke Appling*	7,218	7,218	0	Held American League record, 1947-1971
7	Tommy Corcoran	7,123	0	6,245	Includes 444 in Players' League, 434 in American Association; held major league record, 1904-1908; held single-season record, 1898-1906 (tie)
8	Cal Ripken Jr.*	6,977	6,977	0	Holds the American League single-season record (583 in 1984)
9	Larry Bowa	6,857	0	6,857	
10	Derek Jeter*	6,605	6,605	0	
11	Dave Concepción	6,594	0	6,594	
12	Dave Bancroft*	6,561	0	6,561	Held single-season record, 1920-1924
13	Roger Peckinpaugh	6,337	6,337	0	Held American League record, 1926-1947
14	Bobby Wallace*	6,303	4,895	1,408	Held American League record, 1908-1909, 1910-1918
15	Don Kessinger	6,212	462	5,750	
16	Roy McMillan	6,191	0	6,191	
17	Alan Trammell*	6,172	6,172	0	
18	Germany Smith	6,166	0	4,086	Includes 1,992 in American Association, 88 in Union Association; held major league record, 1897-1904; held single-season record, 1885-1886, 1892-1906; held NL single-season record, 1891-1908
19	Bert Campaneris	6,160	6,160	0	
20	Jimmy Rollins	6,139	86	6,053	
21	Herman Long	6,137	167	5,491	Includes 479 in American Association
22	Donie Bush	6,119	6,119	0	Held American League record, 1918-1926
23	Garry Templeton	6,041	0	6,041	
	Honus Wagner*	6,041	0	6,041	
25	Royce Clayton	5,902	1,807	4,095	
26	Pee Wee Reese*	5,891	0	5,891	
27	Barry Larkin*	5,858	0	5,858	
28	Joe Tinker*	5,856	0	5,411	Includes 445 in Federal League; held single-season record, 1908-1914 (tie)
29	Joe Cronin*	5,814	5,799	15	
30	Dick Groat	5,811	0	5,811	
31	Miguel Tejada	5,804	4,615	1,189	
32	Mark Belanger	5,786	5,724	62	
33	Chris Speier	5,781	28	5,753	
34	Édgar Rentería	5,701	763	4,938	
35	Jack Glasscock	5,632	0	5,525	Includes 107 in Union Association; held major league record, 1887-1897; held National League record, 1885-1905; held single-season record, 1887-1889; held NL single-season record, 1885-1890
36	Dick Bartell	5,590	405	5,185	
37	Bill Russell	5,546	0	5,546	
38	Ed Brinkman	5,466	5,397	69	
39	Monte Cross	5,375	2,118	3,257	
40	Ozzie Guillén	5,335	5,038	297	
41	Leo Cárdenas	5,303	2,153	3,150	Held American League single-season record, 1969-1979 (tie)
42	Mickey Doolin	5,290	0	4,333	Includes 957 in Federal League
43	Elvis Andrus	5,276	5,276	0	
44	George McBride	5,274	4,671	603	
45	Alfredo Griffin	5,186	3,858	1,328	
46	Art Fletcher	5,134	0	5,134	
47	Orlando Cabrera	5,097	2,190	2,907	
48	Everett Scott	5,053	5,047	6	
49	Billy Jurges	4,959	0	4,959	
50	Greg Gagne	4,930	4,168	762	
51	Ed McKean	4,854	0	4,263	Includes 591 in American Association
52	Marty Marion	4,829	138	4,691	
53	Tim Foli	4,804	765	4,039	
	Maury Wills	4,804	0	4,804	
55	George Davis*	4,794	2,467	2,327	Held American League single-season record, 1904-1905
	Robin Yount*	4,794	4,794	0	
57	Freddie Patek	4,786	4,011	775	
58	Arky Vaughan*	4,780	0	4,780	
59	Lou Boudreau*	4,760	4,760	0	
60	Rafael Furcal	4,678	0	4,678	
61	Phil Rizzuto*	4,666	4,666	0	
62	Travis Jackson*	4,636	0	4,636	
63	Jay Bell	4,595	706	3,889	
64	Tony Fernández	4,511	3,499	1,012	
65	Eddie Miller	4,500	0	4,500	
66	Frankie Crosetti	4,484	4,484	0	
67	Leo Durocher*	4,431	395	4,036	
68	Mike Bordick	4,410	4,270	140	
69	Brandon Crawford	4,407	0	4,407	
70	Johnny Logan	4,397	0	4,397	
71	José Reyes	4,363	788	3,575	
72	J. J. Hardy	4,340	2,845	1,495	
73	Bucky Dent	4,332	4,332	0	
74	Bones Ely	4,328	506	3,699	Includes 123 in American Association
75	Wally Gerber	4,319	4,199	120	
76	Álex González	4,271	705	3,566	
77	Jim Fregosi	4,169	4,114	55	
78	Alvin Dark	4,168	0	4,168	
79	Vern Stephens	4,150	4,150	0	
80	Jhonny Peralta	4,123	3,267	856	
81	Jack Wilson	4,059	310	3,749	
82	Iván DeJesús	4,036	21	4,015	
83	Walt Weiss	4,007	1,398	2,609	
84	Rafael Ramírez	3,978	0	3,978	
85	Bud Harrelson	3,975	220	3,755	
86	**Xander Bogaerts (318)**	3,953	2,972	981	
87	Joe Sewell*	3,933	3,933	0	
88	Alcides Escobar	3,919	3,256	663	
89	**Francisco Lindor (197)**	3,896	1,908	2,188	
90	Troy Tulowitzki	3,889	681	3,208	
91	Billy Rogell	3,886	3,875	11	
92	Dick Schofield	3,873	3,473	400	
93	Rick Burleson	3,871	3,871	0	
94	Eddie Joost	3,844	2,781	1,063	
95	Spike Owen	3,814	2,410	1,404	
96	Freddy Parent	3,788	3,788	0	Held American League record, 1902-1908, 1909-1910; held AL single-season record, 1902-1904
97	Shawon Dunston	3,731	21	3,710	
98	Zoilo Versalles	3,645	3,205	440	
99	Doc Lavan	3,628	1,899	1,729	
100	Chico Carrasquel	3,619	3,619	0	

=== Left Fielders ===
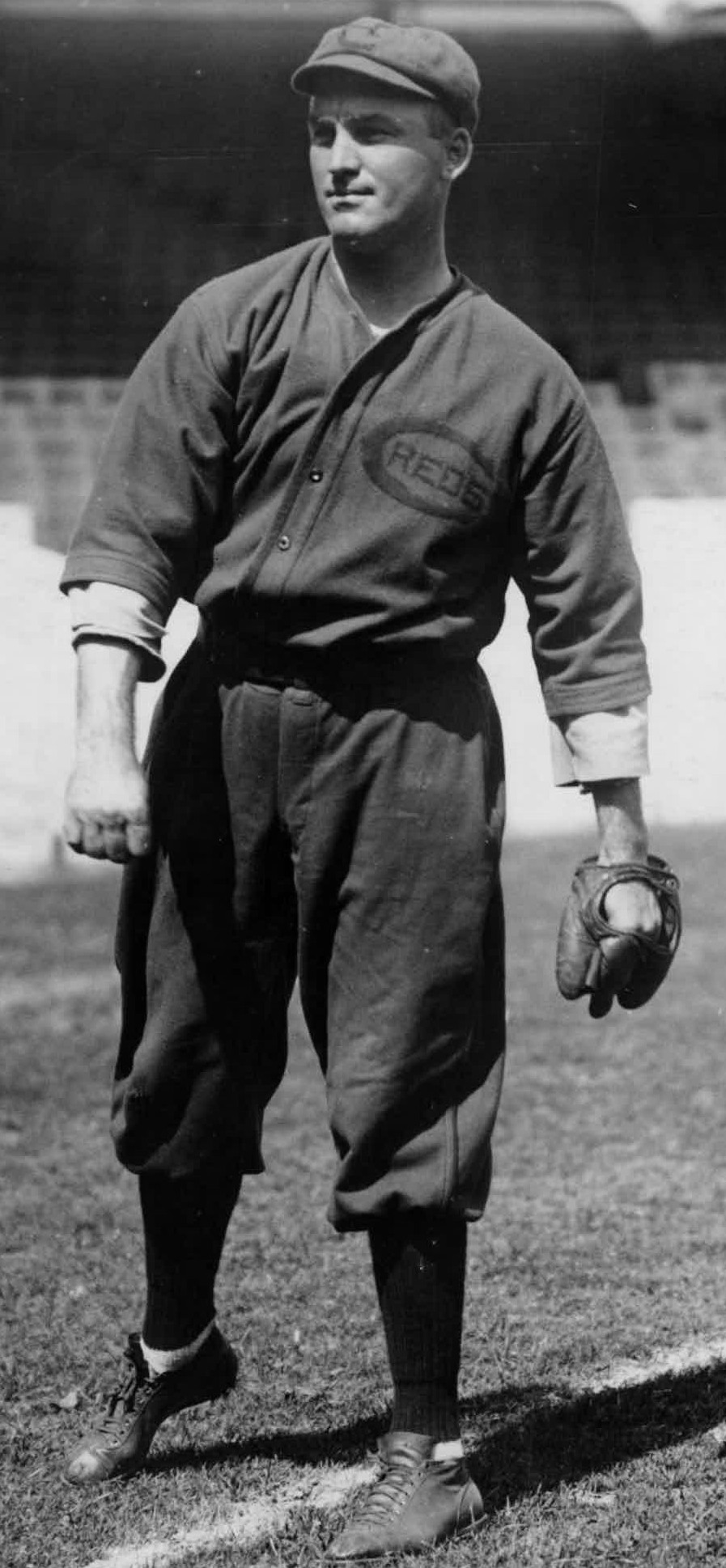
Jimmy Sheckard, the all-time leader in career assists by a left fielder.

The left fielder (LF) is one of the three outfielders, the defensive positions in baseball farthest from the batter. Left field is the area of the outfield to the left of a person standing at home plate and facing toward the pitcher's mound. The outfielders have to try to catch long fly balls before they hit the ground or to quickly catch or retrieve and return to the infield any other balls entering the outfield. The left fielder must also be adept at navigating the area of left field where the foul line approaches the corner of the playing field and the walls of the seating areas. Being the outfielder closest to third base, the left fielder generally does not have to throw as far as the other outfielders to throw out runners advancing around the bases, so they often do not have the strongest throwing arm, but their throws need to be accurate. The left fielder normally plays behind the third baseman and shortstop, who play in or near the infield; unlike catchers and most infielders (excepting first basemen), who are virtually exclusively right-handed, left fielders can be either right- or left-handed. In the scoring system used to record defensive plays, the left fielder is assigned the number 7.

Left fielders are most commonly credited with an assist when they throw the ball to an infielder who tags a runner attempting to advance on the basepaths, even on a caught fly ball that results in an out (see tag up); of special importance are throws to the catcher if the runner is trying to reach home plate to score a run, perhaps on a sacrifice fly. Left fielders will often record assists by throwing out runners who try to advance farther than the batter, such as going from first to third base on a single, or batter/runners who try to stretch a hit into a longer one. Left fielders also earn assists on relay throws to infielders after particularly deep fly balls, by throwing to a base to record an out on an appeal play, or in situations where they might deflect a fly ball before another defensive player makes the catch. Outfielders record far fewer assists than other players due to the difficulty of making an accurate throw in time to retire a runner from a great distance; middle infielders routinely record more assists in a single season than outfielders do in their entire careers. Assists are an important statistic for outfielders, giving a greater indication about an outfielder's throwing arm than assists by infielders do. In recent years, some sabermetricians have begun referring to assists by outfielders as baserunner kills.

The list of career leaders is dominated by players from the 1890s through 1920s, including the dead-ball era, due to that period's emphasis on more aggressive baserunning. Only four of the top 14 players were active after 1932 and only two of them after 1945. Only two of the top 34 single-season totals were recorded after 1924, and only one after 1936; only seven of the top 68 have been recorded since 1944. Because game accounts and box scores often did not distinguish between the outfield positions, there has been some difficulty in determining precise defensive statistics prior to 1901; because of this, and because of the similarity in their roles, defensive statistics for the three positions are frequently combined. Although efforts to distinguish between the three positions regarding games played during this period and reconstruct the separate totals have been largely successful, separate assist totals are unavailable; players whose totals are missing the figures for pre-1901 games are notated in the table below. Jimmy Sheckard is the all-time leader in career assists as a left fielder with 243; this total does not included his assists during the first four years of his career from 1897 through 1900, when he is believed to have played 168 games in left field. Zack Wheat (231) and Duffy Lewis (209) are the only other players credited with more than 200 career assists after 1900. Lourdes Gurriel Jr., who had 52 assists as of the 2026 season to place him tied for 124th all-time, is the leader among active players.

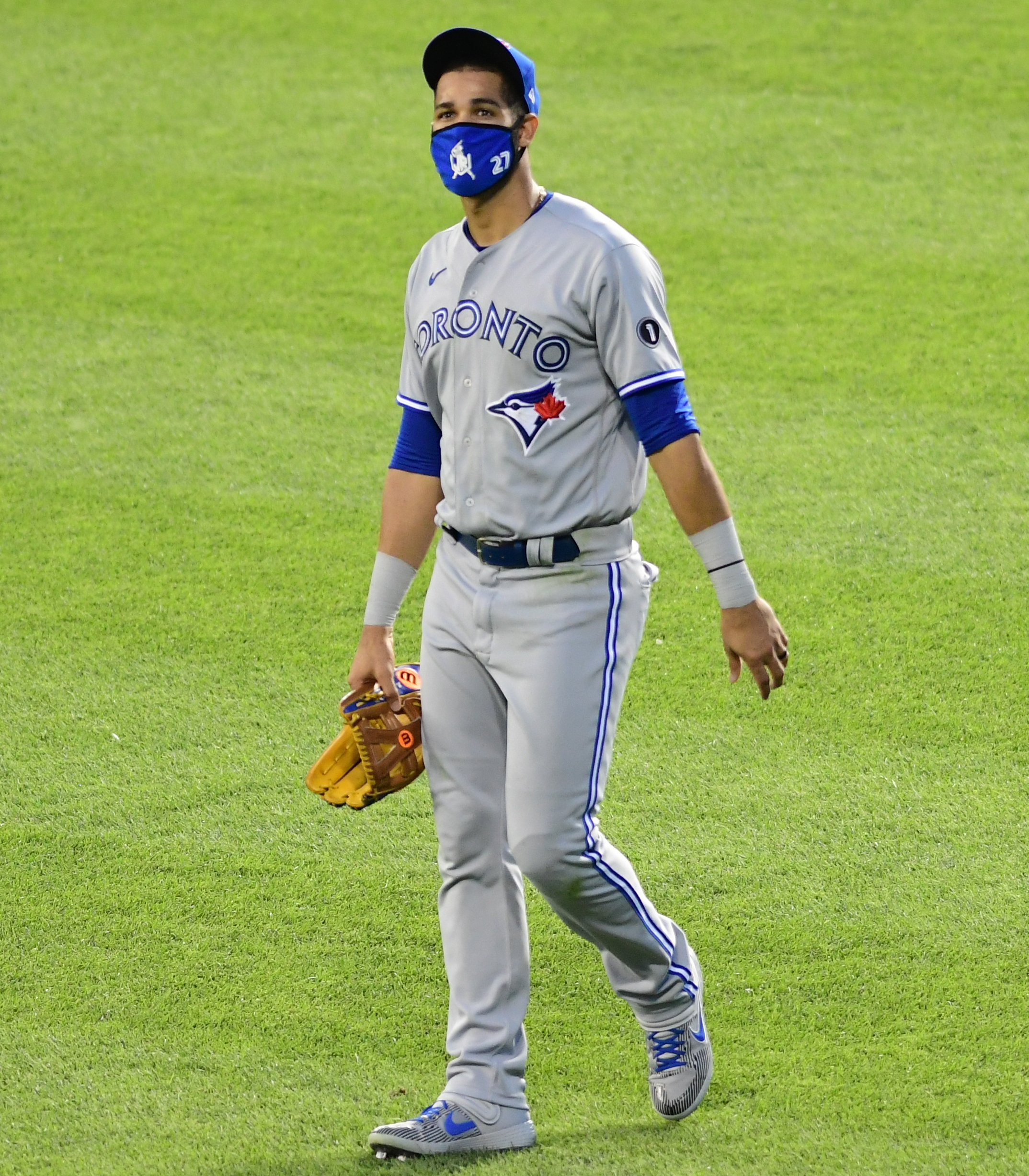
Lourdes Gurriel Jr., the active leader and tied for 124th all-time in assists as a left fielder.

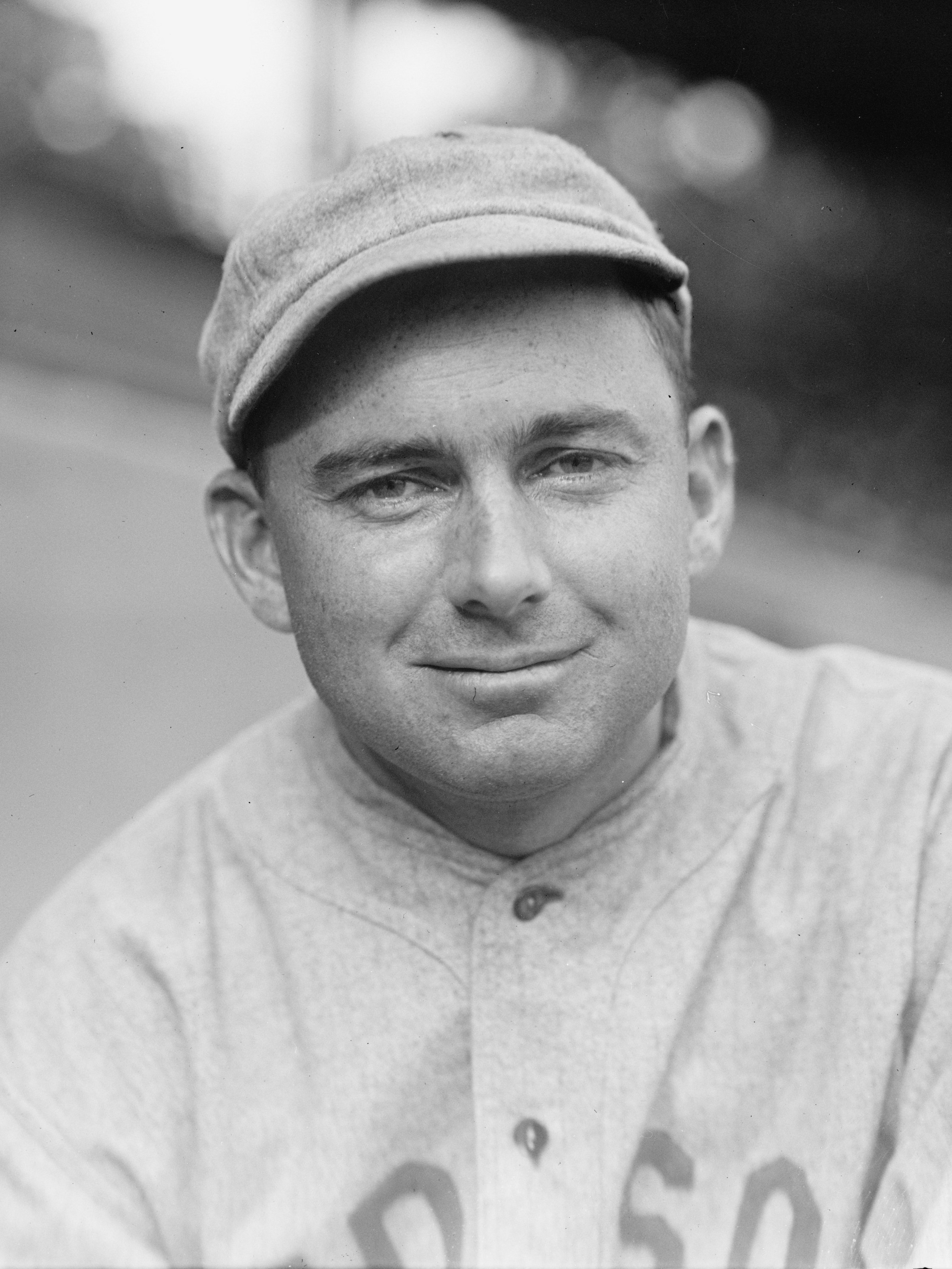
Duffy Lewis holds the American League record.

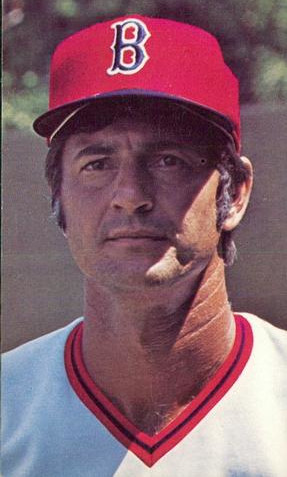
Carl Yastrzemski led American League left fielders in assists a record eight times.

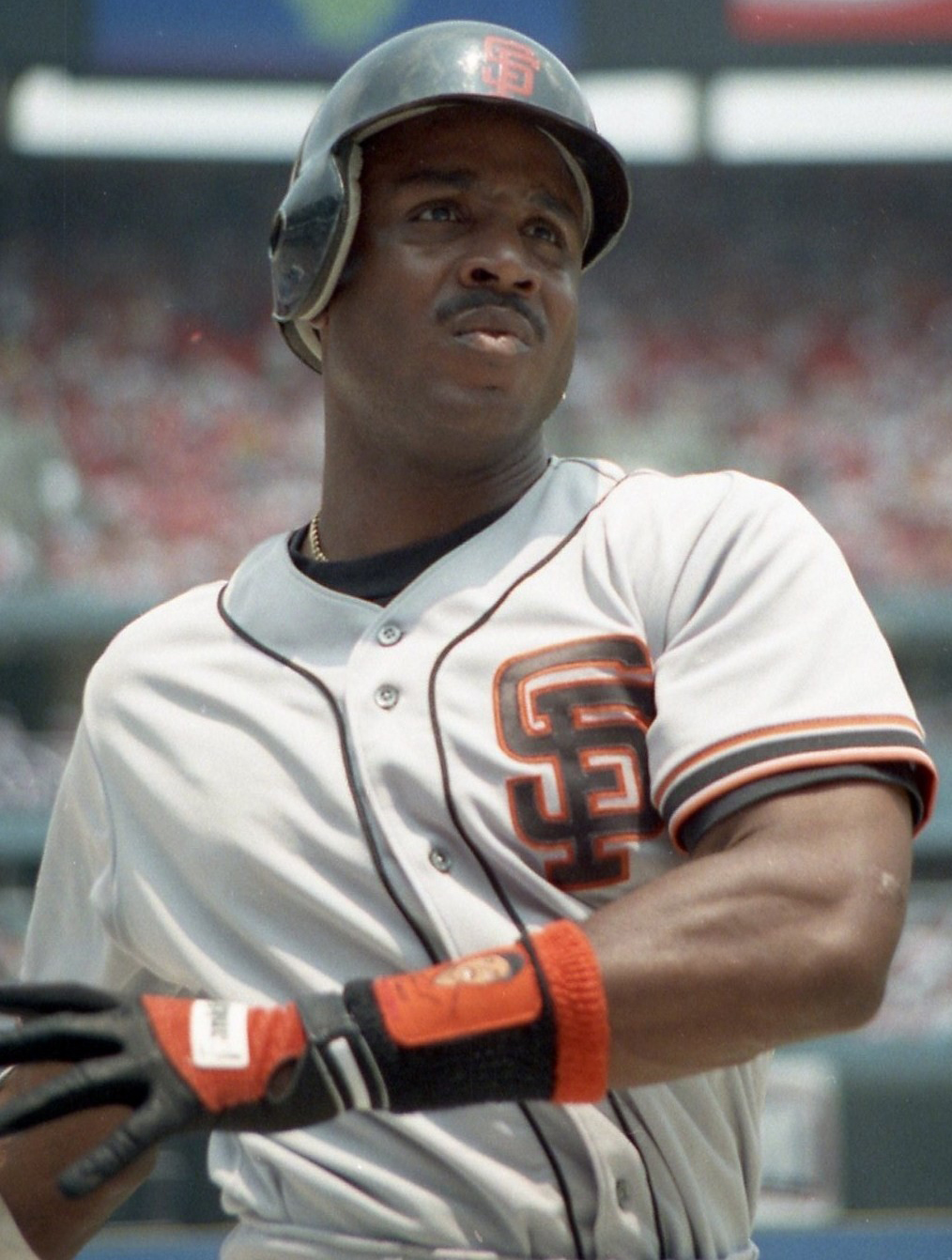
Barry Bonds' 158 career assists are the most by a National League left fielder since 1920.

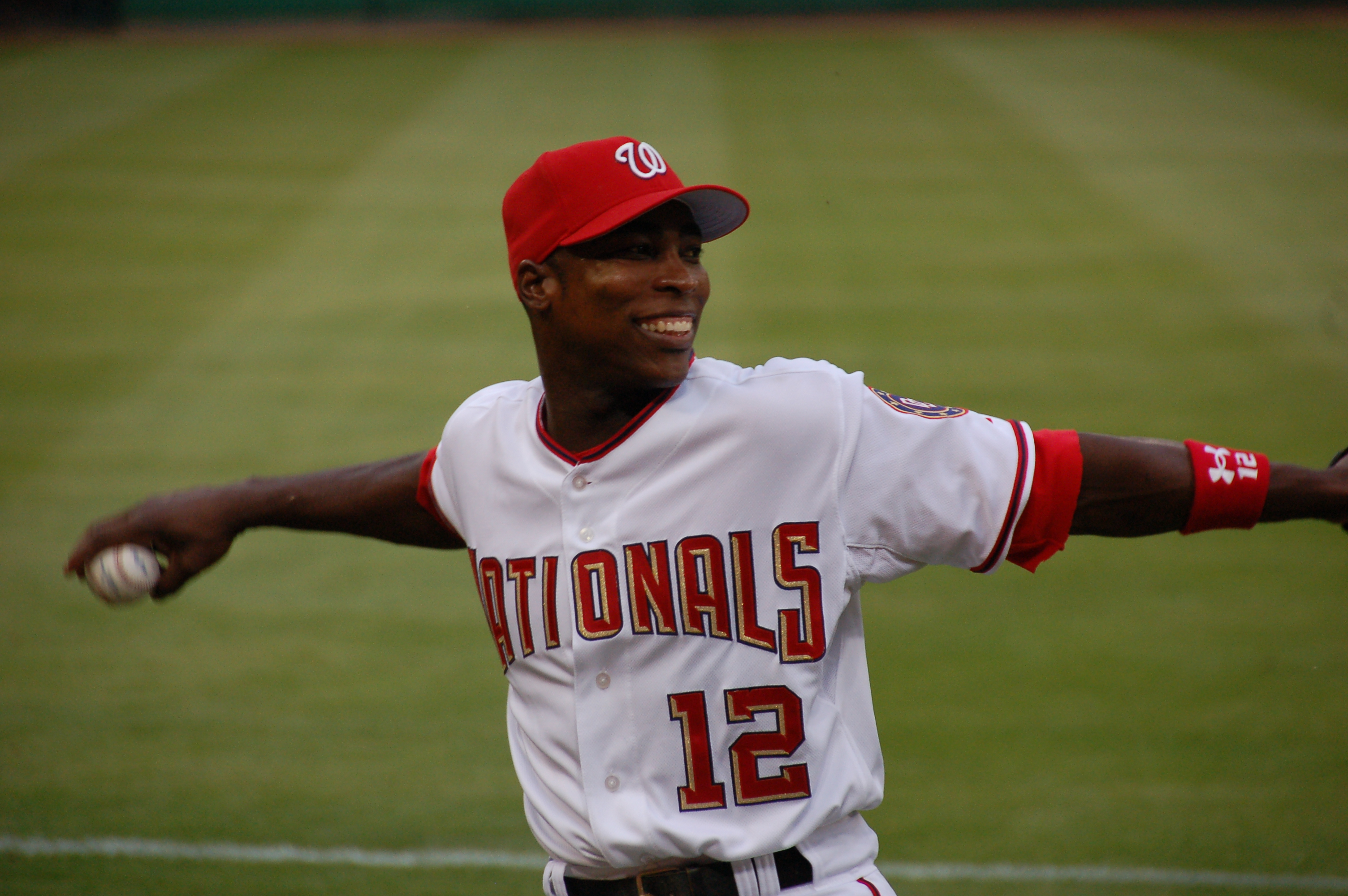
Alfonso Soriano had 22 assists for the Nationals in 2006, the most by a left fielder since 1983.

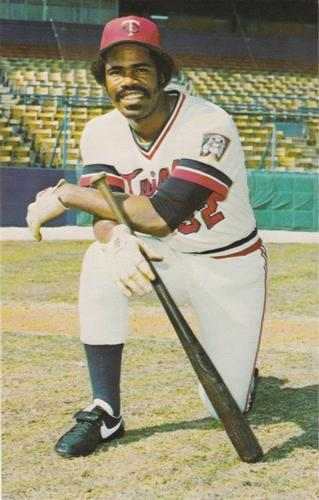
Gary Ward's 24 assists in 1983 are the most by a left fielder since 1936.

- Stats updated as of 2026 season.

Rank	Player (2027 As)	Assists as a left fielder			Other leagues, notes
Rank	Player (2027 As)	MLB	American League	National League	Other leagues, notes
1	Jimmy Sheckard †	243	0	243	Holds the single-season record of 36 (set in 1903)
2	Zack Wheat*	231	8	223	
3	Duffy Lewis	209	209	0	Holds the American League single-season record (30 in 1910; later tied)
4	Bobby Veach	199	199	0	
5	Bob Johnson	182	182	0	
6	Goose Goslin*	181	181	0	
7	Carl Yastrzemski*	177	177	0	
8	Barry Bonds	158	0	158	
9	Charlie Jamieson	150	150	0	
10	Ken Williams	146	136	10	
11	Jack Graney	143	143	0	
12	George Burns	137	0	137	
	Fred Clarke* †	137	0	137	
14	Sherry Magee	133	0	133	
15	Jim Rice*	132	132	0	
16	Joe Medwick*	129	0	129	
	Minnie Miñoso*	129	127	2	Negro League totals unavailable
18	Ted Williams*	126	126	0	
19	Rickey Henderson*	124	111	13	
20	Tim Raines*	123	46	77	
21	Carson Bigbee	122	0	122	
22	Patsy Dougherty	119	119	0	Held American League record, 1907-1914
	Bibb Falk	119	119	0	
24	Bob Bescher	118	0	118	
25	Billy Williams*	116	0	116	
26	Al Simmons*	114	107	7	
27	Matty McIntyre	111	111	0	Held American League record, 1906-1907; held AL single-season record, 1906-1910
28	Luis Gonzalez	110	9	101	
29	Gary Matthews	107	0	107	
30	Lou Brock*	106	0	106	
31	Tilly Walker	105	105	0	Holds the American League single-season record (30 in 1914; tie)
32	Bernard Gilkey	102	1	101	
	Alex Gordon	102	102	0	
34	Del Ennis	101	2	99	
35	Topsy Hartsel †	100	85	15	
	Jo-Jo Moore	100	0	100	
37	Carlos Lee	99	50	49	
38	Irish Meusel	98	0	98	
39	Max Carey*	97	0	97	
	George Foster	97	2	95	
41	Alfonso Soriano	96	5	91	
	Willie Stargell*	96	0	96	
43	Les Mann	95	0	83	Includes 12 in Federal League
44	Pat Burrell	92	0	92	
	Hank Sauer	92	0	92	
46	Joe Vosmik	90	89	1	
47	Vince Coleman	89	20	69	
	José Cruz	89	0	89	
	Sam Mertes †	89	24	65	Held American League record, 1902-1903; held the single-season record, 1902-1903; held AL single-season record, 1902-1906
50	Raúl Ibañez	85	67	18	
	Lonnie Smith	85	18	67	
52	Lou Piniella	84	84	0	
53	Mike Greenwell	83	83	0	
54	Ben Oglivie	82	82	0	
55	Garret Anderson	81	76	5	
56	Jesse Burkett* †	80	63	17	Held American League record, 1903-1906; held AL single-season record, 1904-1906 (tie)
	Roy White	80	80	0	
58	Rube Ellis	78	0	78	
	Gene Woodling	78	78	0	
60	Gus Zernial	77	77	0	
61	Babe Ruth*	76	75	1	
	Burt Shotton	76	56	20	
63	Bobby Higginson	75	75	0	
64	George Bell	74	68	6	
	Geoff Jenkins	74	0	74	
	Howie Shanks	74	74	0	
67	Ralph Kiner*	73	2	71	
	Heinie Manush*	73	73	0	
69	George Stone	72	72	0	
70	Steve Henderson	71	23	48	
71	Cliff Floyd	70	1	69	
	Chick Hafey*	70	0	70	
73	Davy Jones	69	57	0	Includes 12 in Federal League
74	Ryan Braun	68	0	68	
	Melky Cabrera	68	59	9	
	Matt Holliday	68	6	62	
77	Kevin McReynolds	67	8	59	
	Bob Meusel	67	62	5	
	Moose Solters	67	67	0	
80	Greg Luzinski	66	0	66	
	Mike Menosky	66	65	0	Includes 1 in Federal League
	Bob Skinner	66	0	66	
	B. J. Surhoff	66	57	9	
84	Jason Bay	65	21	44	
	Pat Duncan	65	0	65	
	Augie Galan	65	0	65	
	Jeffrey Leonard	65	6	59	
	Austin McHenry	65	0	65	
	Luis Polonia	65	65	0	
90	Dusty Baker	64	5	59	
	Manny Ramirez	64	58	6	
	Greg Vaughn	64	42	22	
93	Albert Belle	63	63	0	
	Jeff Heath	63	57	6	
	Riggs Stephenson	63	0	63	
96	Dan Gladden	62	62	0	
97	Gary Ward	61	61	0	
98	Tommy Davis	59	14	45	
	Carlos May	59	59	0	
	Frank Robinson*	59	6	53	

=== Center Fielders ===
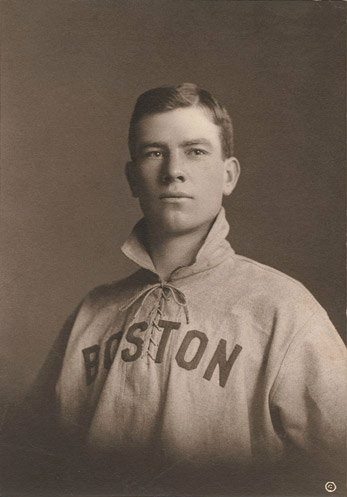
Tris Speaker, the all-time leader in career assists by a center fielder.

The center fielder (CF) is one of the three outfielders, the defensive positions in baseball farthest from the batter. Center field is the area of the outfield directly in front of a person standing at home plate and facing beyond the pitcher's mound. The outfielders have to try to catch long fly balls before they hit the ground or to quickly catch or retrieve and return to the infield any other balls entering the outfield. Generally having the most territory to cover, the center fielder is usually the fastest of the three outfielders, although this can also depend on the relative strength of their throwing arms and the configuration of their home field, due to the deepest part of center field being the farthest point from the infield and home plate. The center fielder normally plays behind the shortstop and second baseman, who play in or near the infield; unlike catchers and most infielders (excepting first basemen), who are virtually exclusively right-handed, center fielders can be either right- or left-handed. In the scoring system used to record defensive plays, the center fielder is assigned the number 8.

Center fielders are most commonly credited with an assist when they throw the ball to an infielder who tags a runner attempting to advance on the basepaths, even on a caught fly ball that results in an out (see tag up); of special importance are throws to the catcher if the runner is trying to reach home plate to score a run, perhaps on a sacrifice fly. Center fielders will often record assists by throwing out runners who try to advance farther than the batter, such as going from first to third base on a single, or batter/runners who try to stretch a hit into a longer one. Center fielders also earn assists on relay throws to infielders after particularly deep fly balls, by throwing to a base to record an out on an appeal play, or in situations where they might deflect a fly ball before another defensive player makes the catch. Outfielders record far fewer assists than other players due to the difficulty of making an accurate throw in time to retire a runner from a great distance; middle infielders routinely record more assists in a single season than outfielders do in their entire careers. Assists are an important statistic for outfielders, giving a greater indication about an outfielder's throwing arm than assists by infielders do. In recent years, some sabermetricians have begun referring to assists by outfielders as baserunner kills.

The list of career leaders is dominated by players from the 1890s through 1920s, including the dead-ball era, due to that period's emphasis on more aggressive baserunning. The top six players were all active throughout the years from 1913 to 1921; only 11 of the top 37 players were active after 1953, and only six of them after 1984. Only six of the top 73 single-season totals were recorded after 1925, and only one after 1945; only nine of the top 163 have been recorded since 1955. Because game accounts and box scores often did not distinguish between the outfield positions, there has been some difficulty in determining precise defensive statistics before 1901; because of this, and because of the similarity in their roles, defensive statistics for the three positions are frequently combined. Although efforts to distinguish between the three positions regarding games played during this period and reconstruct the separate totals have been largely successful, separate assist totals are unavailable; players whose totals are missing the figures for pre-1901 games are notated in the table below. Tris Speaker is the all-time leader in career assists as a center fielder with 448, 173 more than any other player, and nearly two and a half times as many as any player active after 1931. Speaker also holds the single-season record of 35, which he accomplished twice; no player since 1955 has had more than 20, likely putting both of his marks among Major League Baseball's most unbreakable records. Andrew McCutchen, who had 63 assists as of the 2026 season to place him tied for 110th all-time, is the leader among active players.

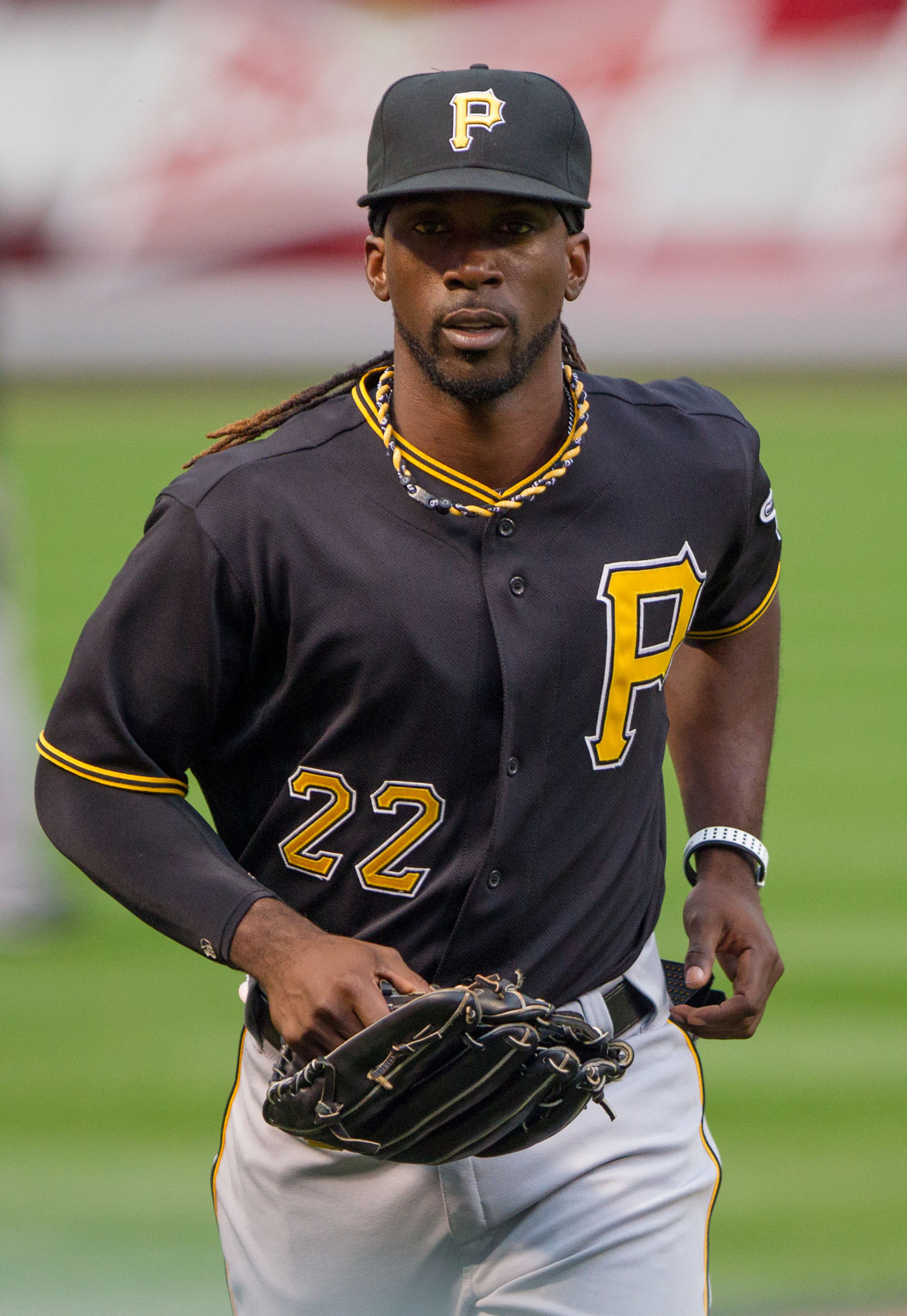
Andrew McCutchen, the active leader and tied for 110th all-time in assists as a center fielder.

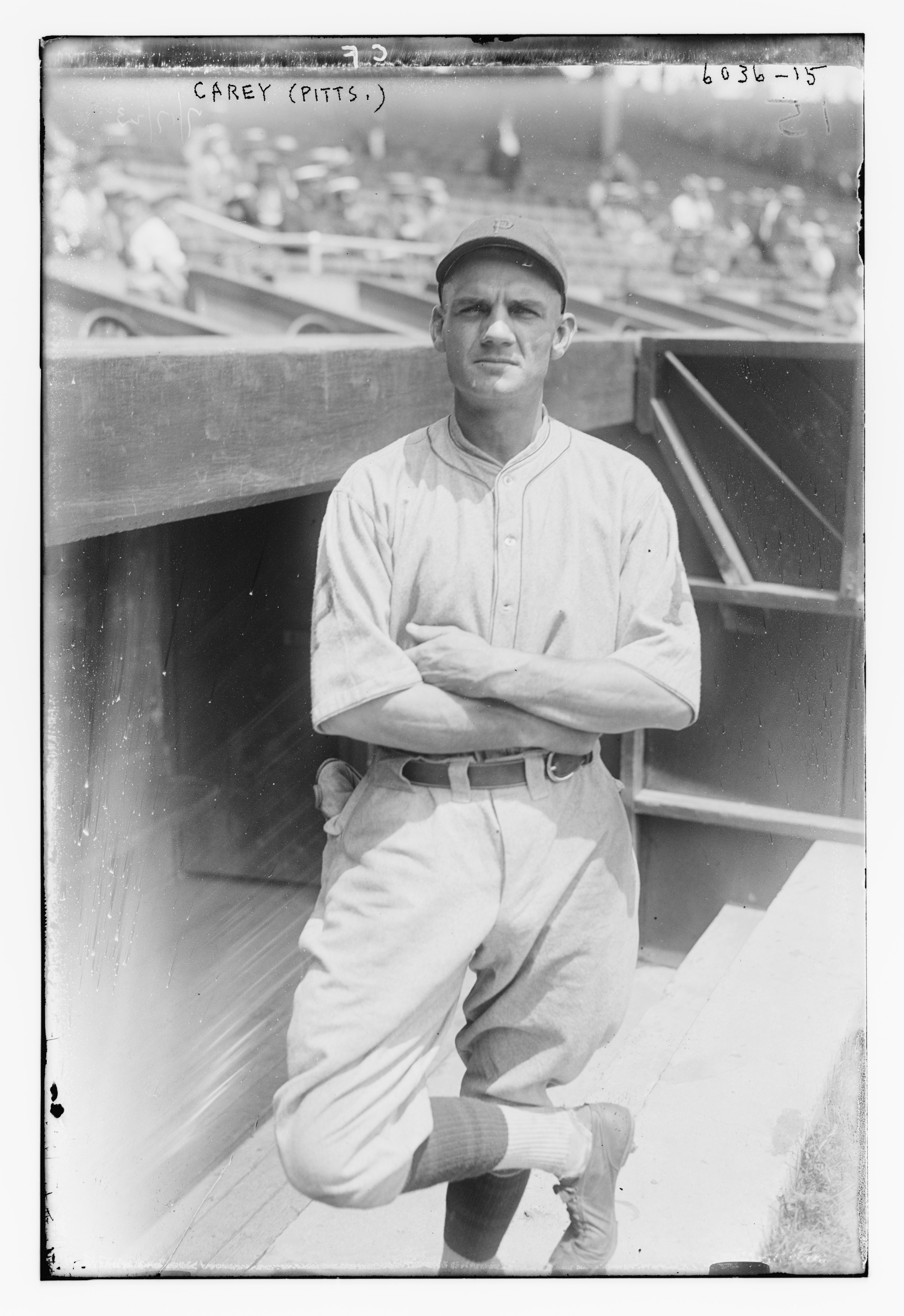
Max Carey holds the modern National League record.

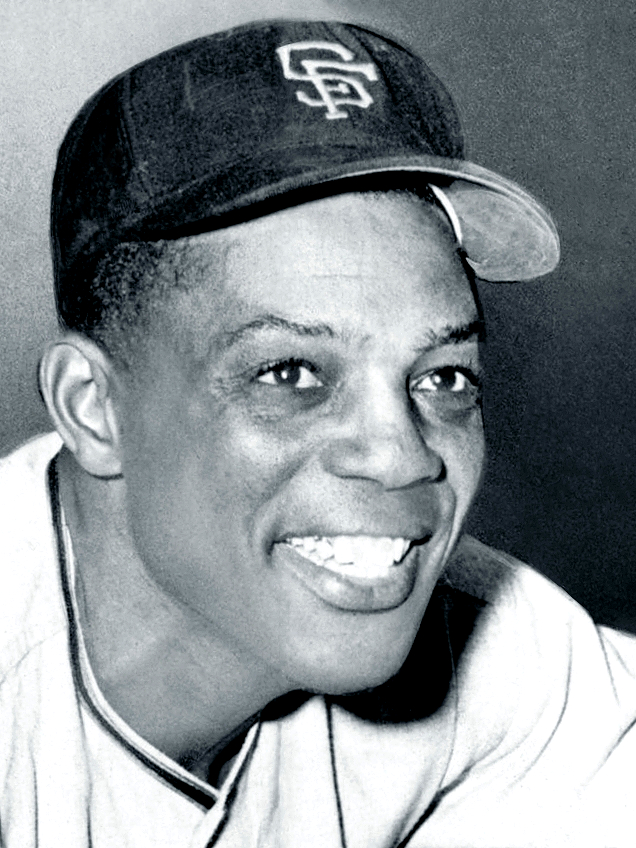
Wille Mays' 188 assists are the most by a center fielder since 1920.

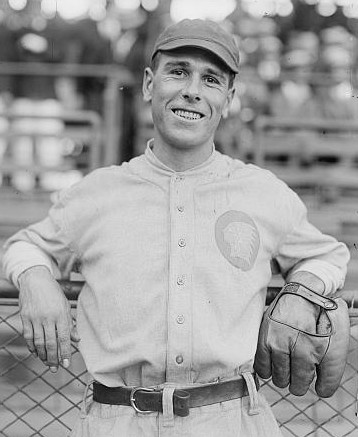
Fred Snodgrass' 31 assists in 1911 remain the modern National League record.

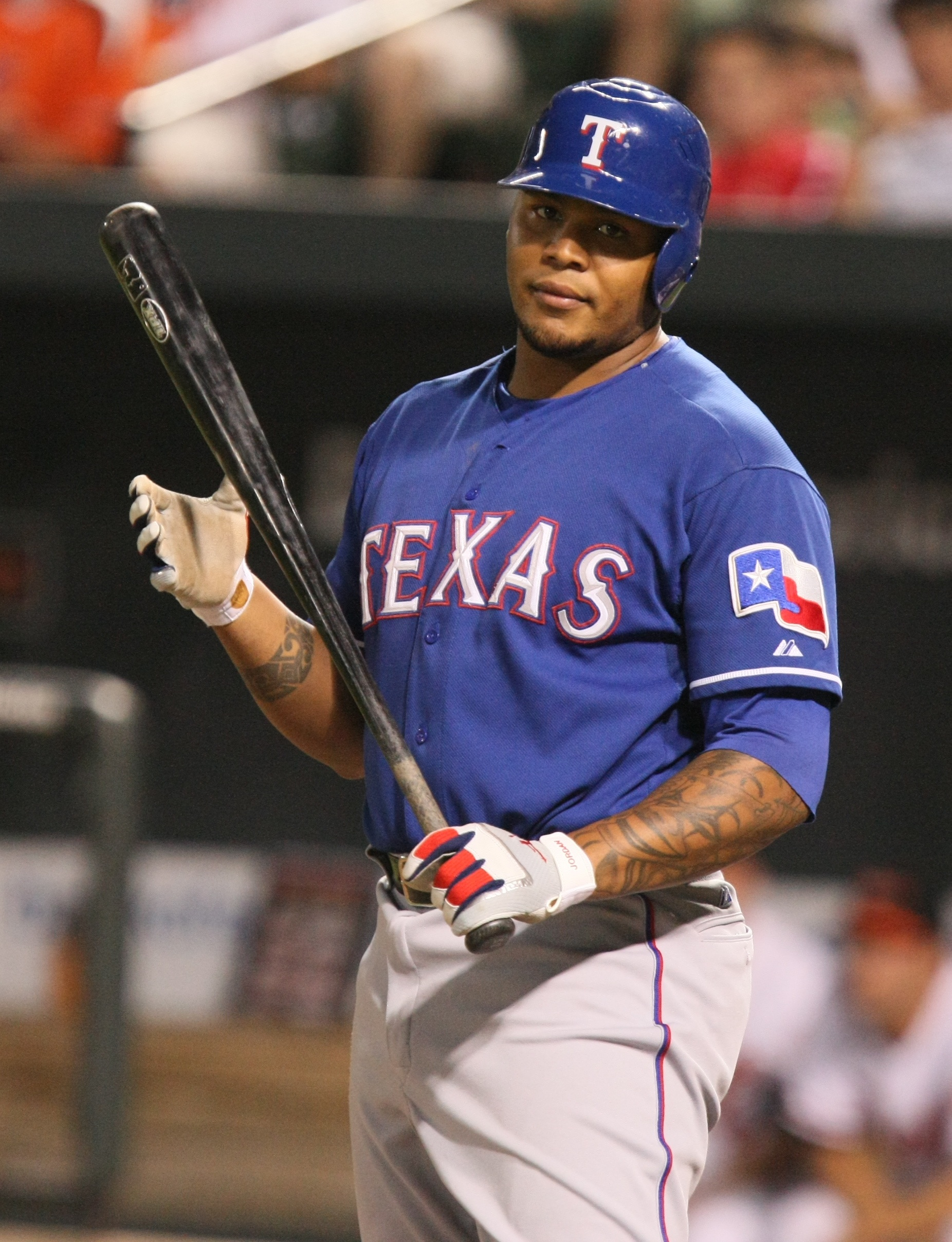
Andruw Jones was the last center fielder to have 20 assists in a season.

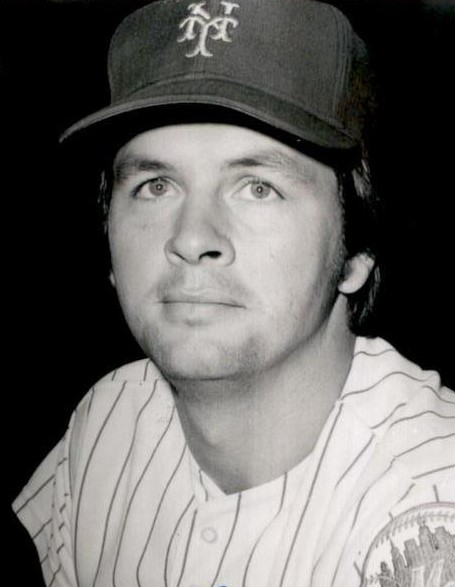
Del Under had 20 assists in 1968, the last American League center fielder to reach the mark.

- Stats updated as of 2026 season.

Rank	Player (2027 As)	Assists as a center fielder			Other leagues, notes
Rank	Player (2027 As)	MLB	American League	National League	Other leagues, notes
1	Tris Speaker*	448	448	0	Holds the modern single-season record of 35 (set in 1909 & 1912)
2	Ty Cobb*	275	275	0	
3	Clyde Milan	244	244	0	
4	Max Carey*	215	0	215	
5	Edd Roush*	207	0	187	Includes 20 in Federal League
6	Dode Paskert	206	0	206	Held modern National League record, 1917-1927
7	Willie Mays*	188	0	188	
8	Doc Cramer	155	155	0	
9	Richie Ashburn*	154	0	154	
10	Cy Williams	151	0	151	
11	Cy Seymour †	149	0	149	Held modern major league record, 1909-1913; held modern National League record, 1909-1917
12	Hy Myers	148	0	148	
13	Dom DiMaggio	143	143	0	
14	Ken Griffey Jr.*	141	108	33	
15	Sam West	139	139	0	
16	Kenny Lofton	138	110	28	
17	Ginger Beaumont †	136	0	136	Held modern NL single-season record, 1907-1911
18	Roy Thomas †	135	0	135	Held modern major league record, 1906-1909; held modern National League record, 1902-1909; held modern NL single-season record, 1902-1907
	Lloyd Waner*	135	0	135	
20	Willie Davis	134	1	133	
21	Joe DiMaggio*	133	133	0	
22	Fielder Jones †	129	129	0	Held American League record, 1907-1913
23	Steve Finley	127	6	121	
24	Vince DiMaggio	123	0	123	
25	Tommy Leach †	122	0	122	
26	Happy Felsch	119	119	0	
27	Amos Otis	118	115	3	
28	Joe Birmingham	117	117	0	
29	Jim Edmonds	116	37	79	
	Rebel Oakes	116	0	81	Includes 35 in Federal League
31	Amos Strunk	115	115	0	
32	Vada Pinson	114	13	101	
33	Kirby Puckett*	110	110	0	
34	Benny Kauff	109	0	66	Includes 43 in Federal League
35	Earl Averill*	108	106	2	
	Carlos Beltrán*	108	61	47	
	Fred Snodgrass	108	0	108	Holds the modern NL single-season record of 31 (set in 1911)
38	Brett Butler	106	40	66	
	Curt Flood	106	0	106	
40	Paul Blair	104	103	1	
	Mickey Mantle*	104	104	0	
42	Jimmy Barrett †	101	101	0	Held modern major league record, 1901-1906; held American League record, 1901-1907; held the AL single-season record, 1901-1909
	Andruw Jones*	101	0	101	
44	Ray Powell	100	0	100	
45	Terry Moore	99	0	99	
	Duke Snider*	99	0	99	
	Tilly Walker	99	99	0	
48	Bill Bruton	98	19	79	
49	Adam Jones	96	96	0	
	Fred Lynn	96	96	0	
	Bill Virdon	96	0	96	
52	Nemo Leibold	92	92	0	
	Bill Tuttle	92	92	0	
54	Sam Chapman	91	91	0	
	Ira Flagstead	91	89	2	
	Garry Maddox	91	0	91	
57	Del Unser	90	44	46	
58	Johnny Bates	89	0	85	Includes 4 in Federal League
	Marquis Grissom	89	7	82	
60	Mickey Rivers	88	88	0	
61	César Cedeño	87	0	87	
	Johnny Mostil	87	87	0	
63	Mike Kreevich	86	85	1	
	Willie McGee	86	6	80	
65	Chet Lemon	85	85	0	
66	Solly Hofman	84	2	74	Includes 8 in Federal League
67	Danny Hoffman	83	83	0	
68	Burt Shotton	82	81	1	
	Devon White	82	63	19	
70	Omar Moreno	81	11	70	
	Jigger Statz	81	0	81	
72	Ping Bodie	79	79	0	
	Torii Hunter	79	79	0	
	Homer Smoot	79	0	79	
75	Chick Stahl †	78	78	0	
	Jimmy Wynn	78	0	78	
77	Dave Henderson	77	76	1	
	Bobby Thomson	77	1	76	
79	Larry Doby*	76	76	0	Negro League totals unavailable
	Dwayne Murphy	76	75	1	
	Sam Rice*	76	76	0	
	Stan Spence	76	76	0	
83	Johnny Groth	75	75	0	
	Andy Van Slyke	75	2	73	
85	Baby Doll Jacobson	74	74	0	
	Andy Pafko	74	0	74	
	Fred Schulte	74	73	1	
88	Rick Monday	73	34	39	
89	Ethan Allen	72	7	65	
	Mike Cameron	72	35	37	
	Emmet Heidrick †	72	57	15	
92	B. J. Upton	71	52	19	
93	Andre Dawson*	70	0	70	
	Lance Johnson	70	45	25	
95	Oscar Charleston*	69	0	0	Includes 45 in Negro National League (first), 17 in Eastern Colored League, 7 in American Negro League (incomplete)
	Hack Wilson*	69	0	69	
97	Mark Kotsay	68	29	39	
	Jack Smith	68	0	68	
99	Ron LeFlore	66	66	0	
100	Earle Combs*	65	65	0	
	Carlos Gómez	65	27	38	
	Rick Manning	65	65	0	

=== Right Fielders ===
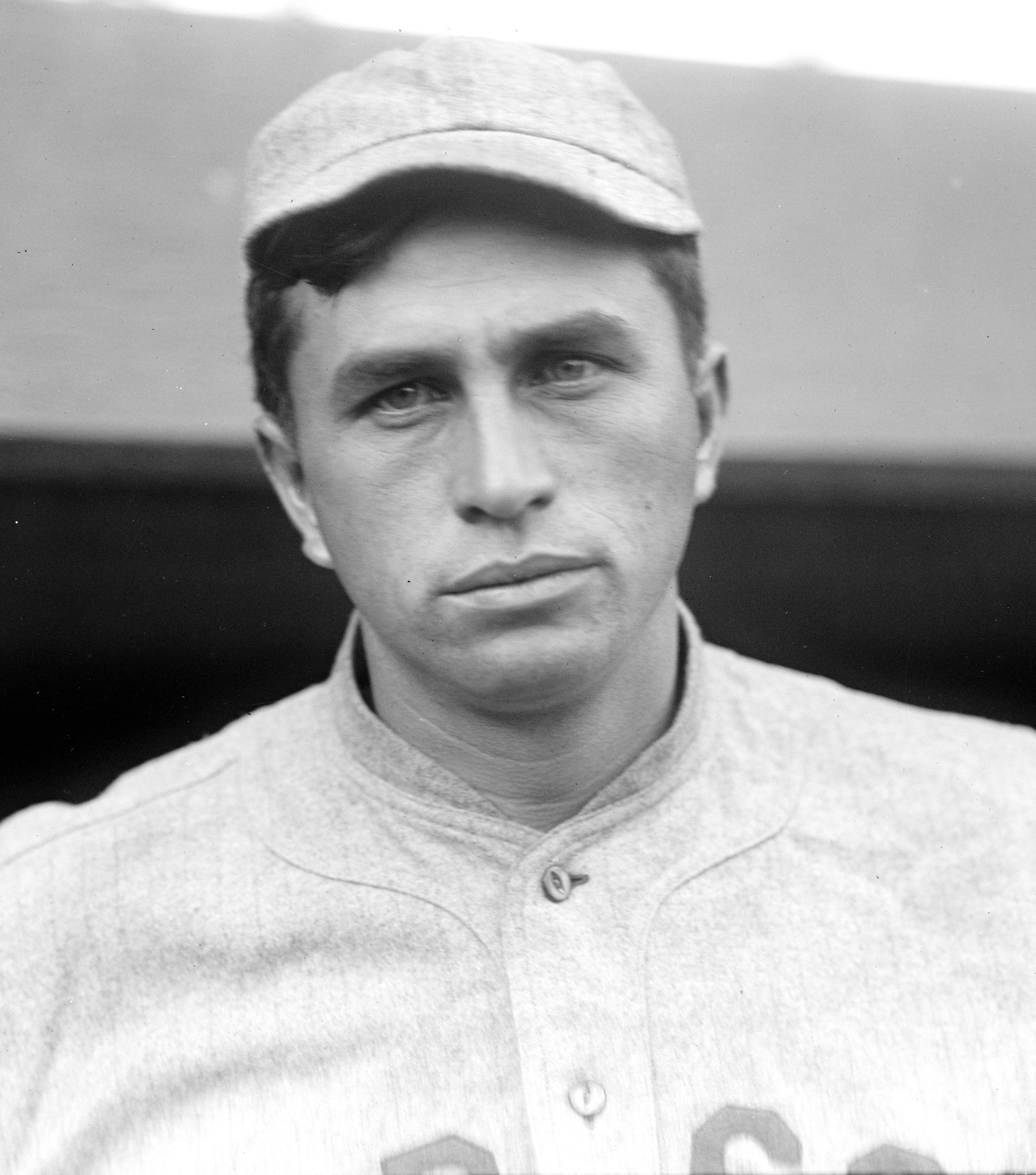
Harry Hooper, the all-time leader in career assists by a right fielder.

The right fielder (RF) is one of the three outfielders, the defensive positions in baseball farthest from the batter. The right field is the area of the outfield to the right of a person standing at home plate and facing toward the pitcher's mound. The outfielders must try to catch long fly balls before they hit the ground or to quickly catch or retrieve and return to the infield any other balls entering the outfield. The right fielder must also be adept at navigating the area of right field where the foul line approaches the corner of the playing field and the walls of the seating areas. Being the outfielder farthest from third base, the right fielder often has to make longer throws than the other outfielders to throw out runners advancing around the bases, so they often have the strongest or most accurate throwing arm. The right fielder normally plays behind the second baseman and first baseman, who play in or near the infield; unlike catchers and most infielders (excepting first basemen), who are virtually exclusively right-handed, right fielders can be either right- or left-handed. In the scoring system used to record defensive plays, the right fielder is assigned the number 9, the highest number.

Right fielders are most commonly credited with an assist when they throw the ball to an infielder who tags a runner attempting to advance on the basepaths, even on a caught fly ball that results in an out (see tag up); of special importance are throws to the catcher if the runner is trying to reach home plate to score a run, perhaps on a sacrifice fly. Right fielders will often record assists by throwing out runners who try to advance farther than the batter, such as going from first to third base on a single, or batter/runners who try to stretch a hit into a longer one. Right fielders also earn assists on relay throws to infielders after particularly deep fly balls, by throwing to a base to record an out on an appeal play, or in situations where they might deflect a fly ball before another defensive player makes the catch. Outfielders record far fewer assists than other players due to the difficulty of making an accurate throw in time to retire a runner from a great distance; middle infielders routinely record more assists in a single season than outfielders do in their entire careers. Assists are an important statistic for outfielders, giving a greater indication about an outfielder's throwing arm than assists by infielders do. In recent years, some sabermetricians have begun referring to assists by outfielders as baserunner kills.

The list of career leaders is dominated by players from the 1890s through 1920s, including the dead-ball era, due to that period's emphasis on more aggressive baserunning. Eight of the top nine players were active before 1930; only six of the top 19 players were active after 1950, none of them after 1992. Only 15 of the top 102 single-season totals were recorded after 1936, and only four after 1978; only 16 of the top 268 have been recorded since 1990. Because game accounts and box scores often did not distinguish between the outfield positions, there has been some difficulty in determining precise defensive statistics before 1901; because of this, and because of the similarity in their roles, defensive statistics for the three positions are frequently combined. Although efforts to distinguish between the three positions regarding games played during this period and reconstruct the separate totals have been largely successful, separate assist totals are unavailable; players whose totals are missing the figures for pre-1901 games are notated in the table below. Harry Hooper is the all-time leader in career assists as a right fielder with 333; he is the only right fielder with more than 300 career assists. Giancarlo Stanton, who had 65 assists as of the 2026 season to place him tied for 123rd all-time, is the leader among active players.

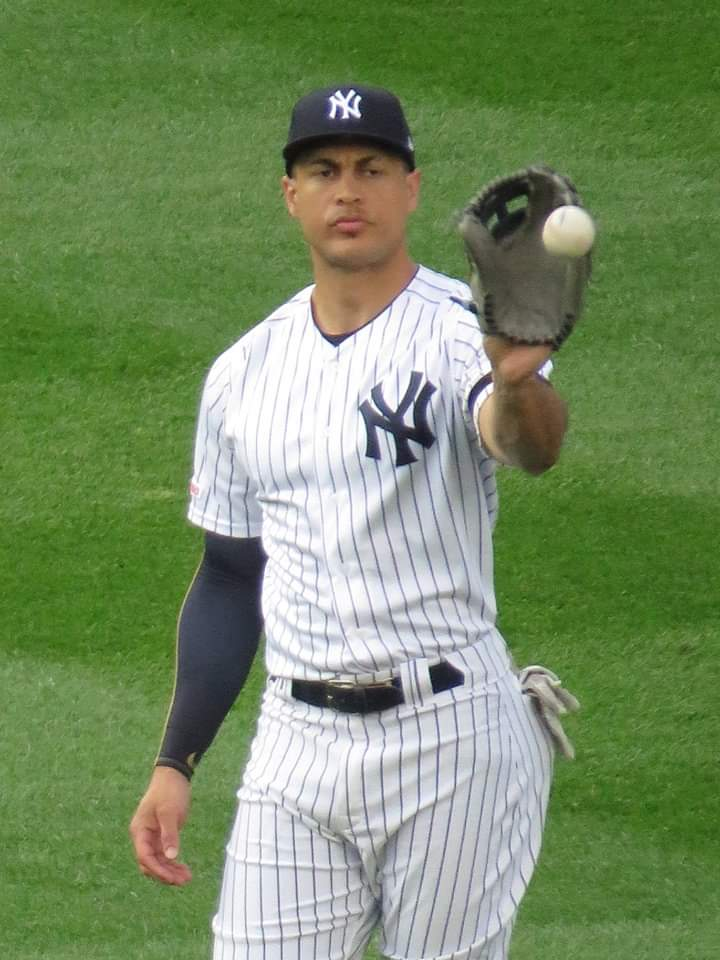
Giancarlo Stanton, the active leader in assists by a right fielder and tied for 123rd all-time.

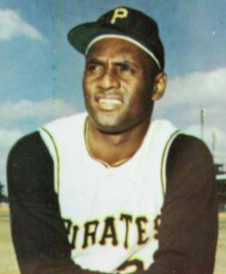
Roberto Clemente holds the modern National League record.

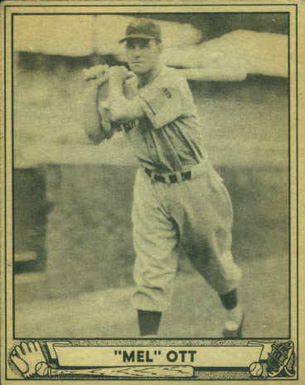
Mel Ott shared the National League record for 24 years.

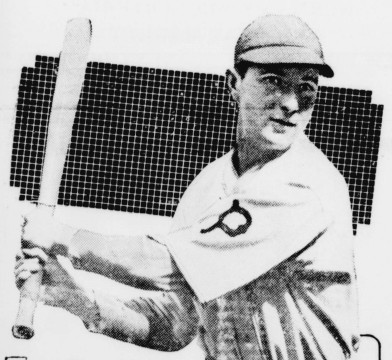
Paul Waner held the National League record for 33 years.

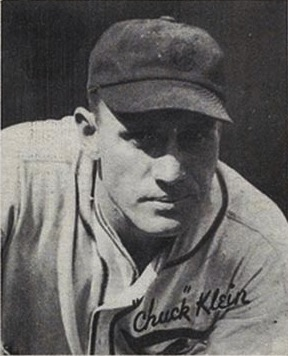
Chuck Klein had 41 assists in 1930, the most by a right fielder since 1900.

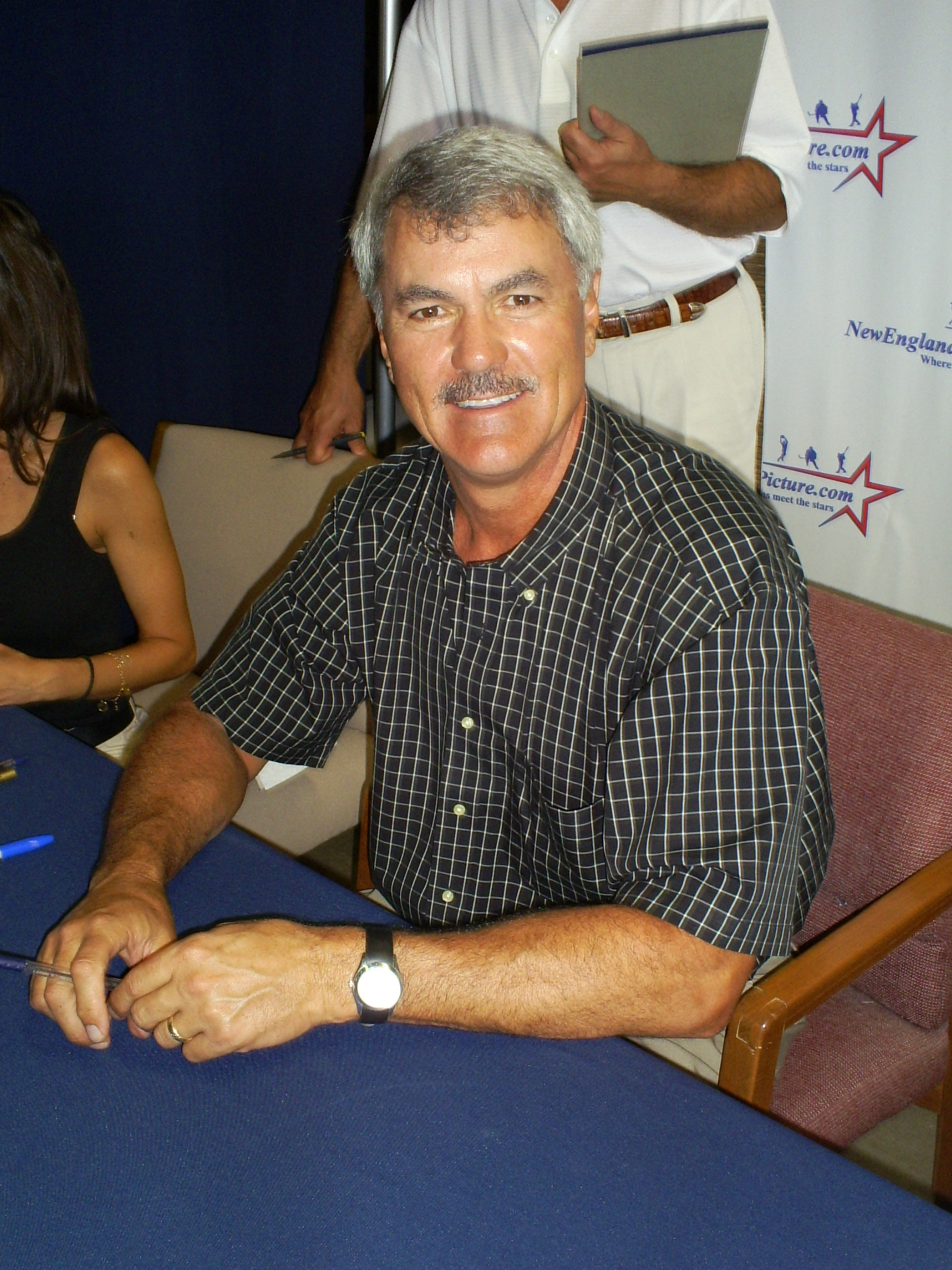
Dwight Evans' 155 assists were the most by an American League right fielder since 1920.

- Stats updated as of the 2026 season.

Rank	Player (2026 As)	Assists as a right fielder			Other leagues, notes
Rank	Player (2026 As)	MLB	American League	National League	Other leagues, notes
1	Harry Hooper*	333	333	0	
2	Roberto Clemente*	255	0	255	
3	Mel Ott*	235	0	235	Held modern National League record, 1946-1970
	Paul Waner*	235	0	235	Held modern National League record, 1937-1970
5	Sam Crawford* †	195	152	43	Held modern major league record, 1905-1909, 1914-1918; held American League record, 1906-1907, 1911-1915
6	Sam Rice*	192	192	0	
7	Ross Youngs*	185	0	185	Held modern National League record, 1926-1937
8	Tommy Griffith	182	0	182	Held modern National League record, 1925-1926
9	John Titus	180	0	180	Held modern major league record, 1909-1914; held modern National League record, 1907-1925
10	Hank Aaron*	179	0	179	
11	Chuck Klein*	174	0	174	Holds the modern single-season record of 41 (set in 1930)
12	Harry Heilmann*	173	157	16	Holds the American League single-season record (31 in 1924)
13	Johnny Callison	159	6	153	
	Rusty Staub	159	10	149	
15	Gavvy Cravath	158	3	155	
16	Dwight Evans	155	155	0	
17	Jesse Barfield	154	154	0	
18	Max Flack	153	0	137	Includes 16 in Federal League
19	Jack Tobin	151	102	0	Includes 49 in Federal League
20	Larry Walker*	150	0	150	
21	Tony Gwynn*	148	0	148	
22	Al Kaline*	146	146	0	
23	Mike Mitchell	145	0	145	Held the modern single-season record, 1907-1930
24	Chief Wilson	143	0	143	
25	Dave Parker*	136	0	136	
	Frank Schulte	136	9	127	
27	Wally Moses	134	134	0	
28	Bobby Abreu	130	38	92	
29	Jeff Francoeur	128	38	90	
	Dave Winfield*	128	51	77	
31	Sammy Sosa	127	23	104	
32	Vladimir Guerrero*	126	42	84	
	Reggie Jackson*	126	126	0	
34	Shano Collins	120	120	0	
	Red Murray	120	0	120	
	Curt Walker	120	0	120	
37	Nick Markakis	119	92	27	
	Casey Stengel*	119	0	119	
39	Enos Slaughter*	118	6	112	
40	Willie Keeler* †	117	86	31	
41	Carl Furillo	115	0	115	
42	Babe Ruth*	114	114	0	
43	Bill Nicholson	112	0	112	
44	Steve Evans	111	0	81	Includes 30 in Federal League
	Dixie Walker	111	11	100	
46	Elmer Flick* †	110	87	23	Held modern major league record, 1901-1902; held American League record, 1905-1906, 1907-1911; held the modern single-season record, 1901-1902
47	Bobby Bonds	108	47	61	
	Magglio Ordóñez	108	108	0	
49	Paul O'Neill	105	53	52	
50	Bruce Campbell	104	104	0	
	Kiki Cuyler*	104	0	104	
	Cliff Heathcote	104	0	104	
53	Jackie Jensen	103	103	0	
	Raúl Mondesí	103	37	66	
55	Al Cowens	102	102	0	
56	Willard Marshall	100	1	99	
	Tim Salmon	100	100	0	
	Ichiro Suzuki*	100	97	3	
59	Tom Brunansky	99	81	18	
60	Harry Lumley	98	0	98	
	Rubén Sierra	98	97	1	
62	Ty Cobb*	96	96	0	Held American League single-season record, 1907-1924
	Jermaine Dye	96	94	2	
	Gene Moore	96	19	77	
65	George Browne	95	6	89	
	Jay Buhner	95	95	0	
	José Guillén	95	40	55	
	Billy Southworth*	95	1	94	
	Glenn Wilson	95	15	80	
70	Jay Bruce	94	4	90	
	Shoeless Joe Jackson	94	94	0	
72	Sixto Lezcano	93	61	32	
73	Jack Clark	91	1	90	
74	Babe Herman	90	0	90	
	Hunter Pence	90	0	90	
76	José Bautista	88	79	9	
77	Rocky Colavito	87	87	0	
	Tommy Henrich	87	87	0	
79	Hank Bauer	86	86	0	
80	Bob Meusel	84	83	1	
81	Jeromy Burnitz	83	13	70	
	Shawn Green	83	43	40	
	Cory Snyder	83	65	18	
84	Wally Post	82	0	82	
85	Socks Seybold †	81	81	0	
	Elmer Smith	81	78	3	
	Ellis Valentine	81	5	76	
88	Patsy Donovan †	80	15	65	Held modern major league record, 1902-1905; held modern National League record, 1902-1906; held the modern single-season record, 1902-1907
89	Pete Fox	79	79	0	
	Danny Moeller	79	78	1	
91	Andre Dawson*	77	0	77	
	Braggo Roth	77	77	0	
93	Cozy Dolan †	76	0	76	Held modern National League record, 1906-1907
	Doc Gessler	76	68	8	
	Darryl Strawberry	76	3	73	
96	Danny Murphy †	75	67	0	Includes 8 in Federal League
	Ron Northey	75	1	74	
98	Dante Bichette	74	32	42	
	George Harper	74	7	67	
100	Ival Goodman	73	0	73	
	Gary Sheffield	73	17	56	
