= 2018 Baseball Hall of Fame balloting =

Elections to the Baseball Hall of Fame

National Baseball

Hall of Fame and Museum
- New inductees: 6
- via BBWAA: 4
- via Modern Baseball Era Committee: 2
- Total inductees: 323
- Induction date: July 29, 2018

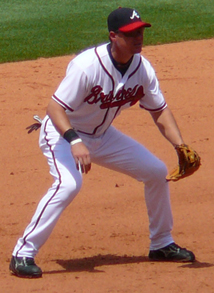
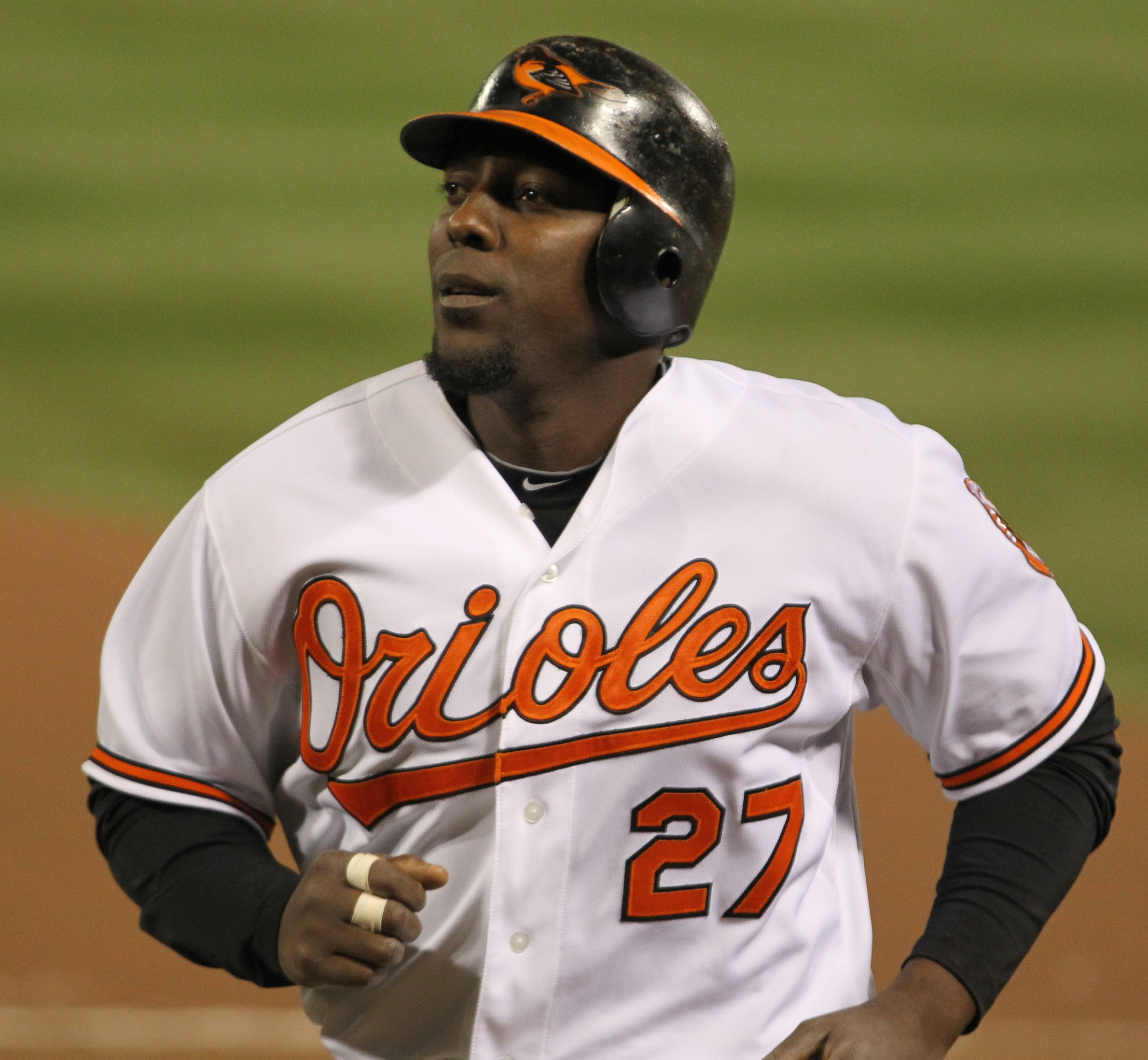
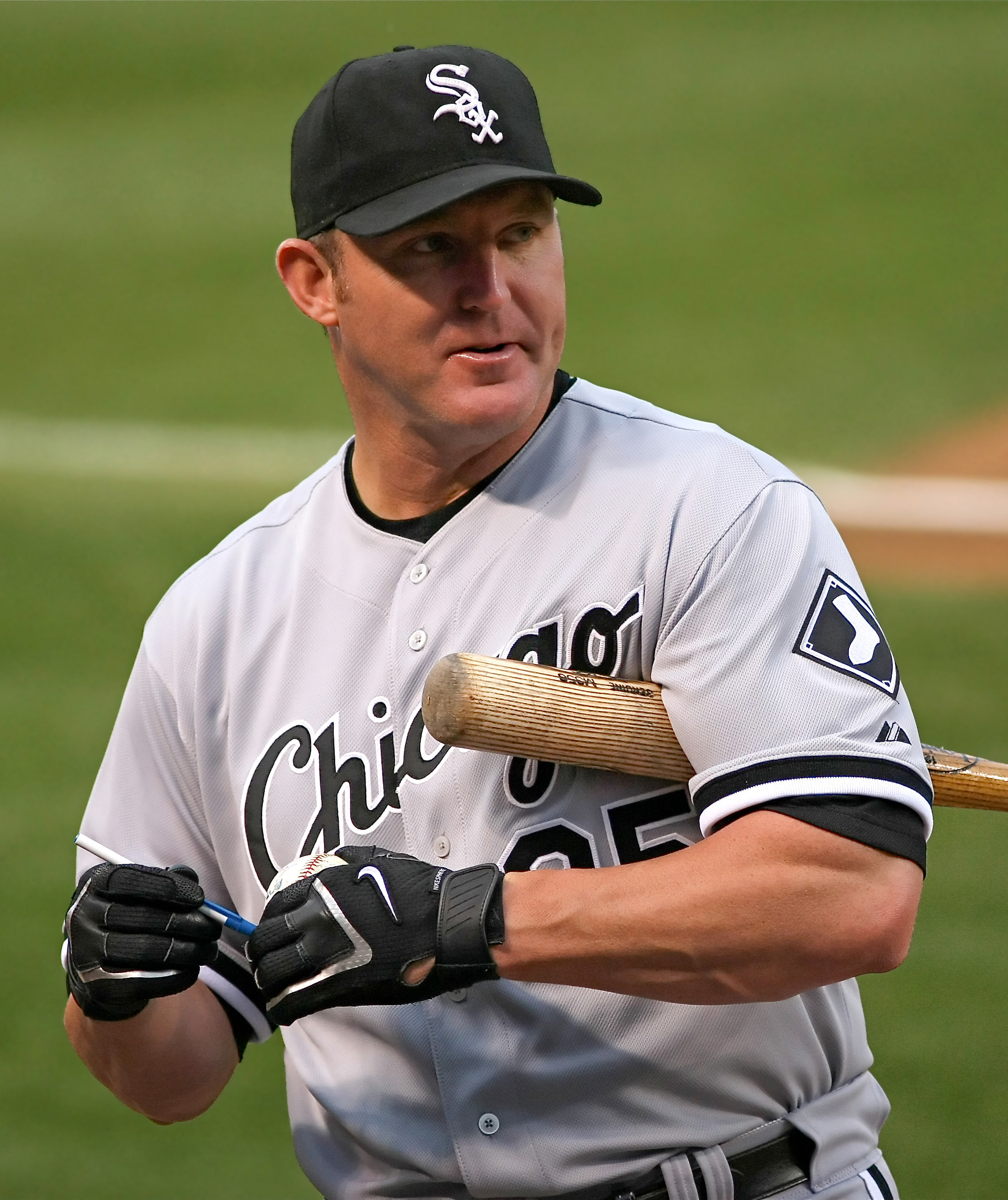
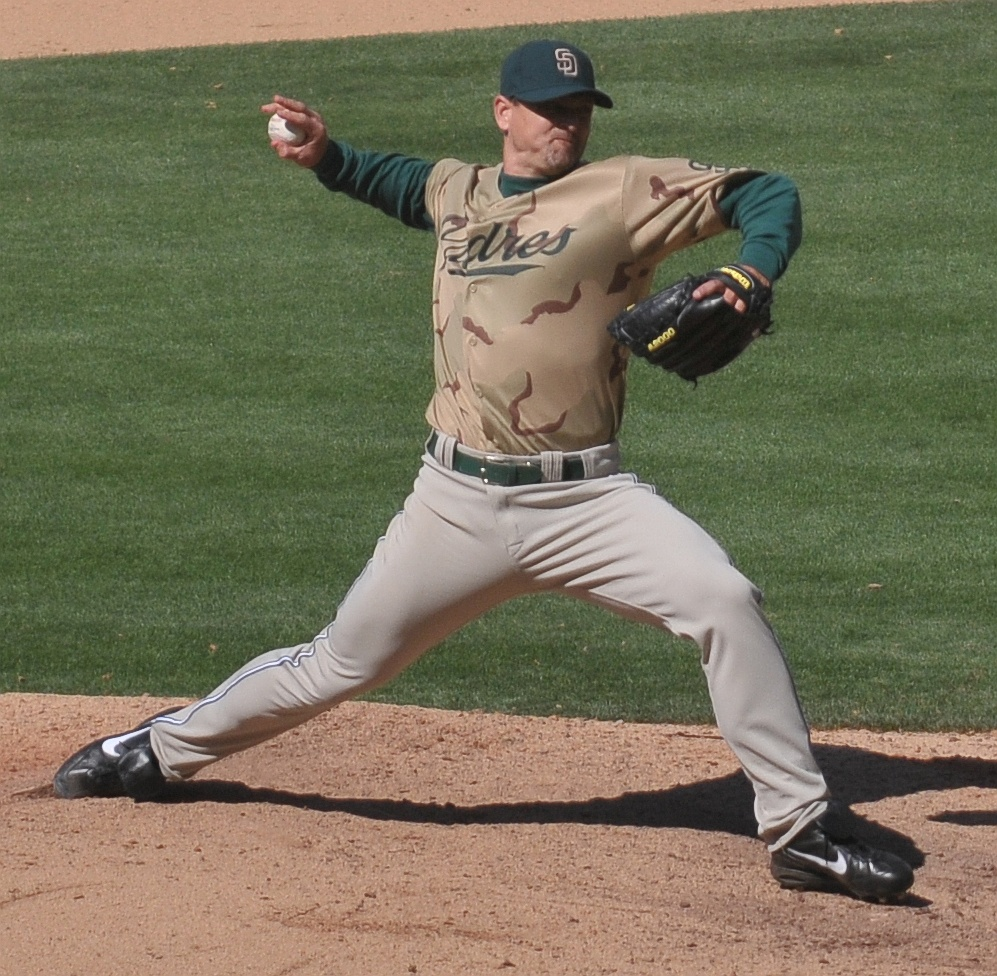
2018 BBWAA inductees (L-R): Chipper Jones, Vladimir Guerrero, Jim Thome, and Trevor Hoffman

Elections to the National Baseball Hall of Fame for 2018 proceeded according to rules most recently amended in 2016. As in the past, the Baseball Writers' Association of America (BBWAA) voted by mail to select from a ballot of recently retired players. The results were announced on January 24, 2018, with the BBWAA electing Chipper Jones, Vladimir Guerrero, Jim Thome and Trevor Hoffman to the Hall of Fame. Jones and Thome were elected in their first year of eligibility.

The three voting panels that replaced the more broadly defined Veterans Committee following a 2010 rules change were replaced by a new set of four panels in 2016. The Modern Baseball Era Committee convened on December 10, 2017, to select from a ballot of retired players and non-playing personnel who made their greatest contributions to the sport between 1970 and 1987, with Jack Morris and Alan Trammell elected by this body. The formal induction ceremony was held at the Hall's facilities in Cooperstown, New York, on July 29, 2018.

== BBWAA election ==
Key
	Elected to the Hall of Fame on this ballot (named in **bold italics**).
	Elected subsequently, as of 2026 (named in plain italics).
	Renominated for the 2019 BBWAA election by adequate performance on this ballot and has not subsequently been eliminated.
	Eliminated from annual BBWAA consideration by poor performance or expiration on subsequent ballots.
	Eliminated from annual BBWAA consideration by poor performance or expiration on this ballot.
†	First time on the BBWAA ballot.
*	Eliminated from annual BBWAA consideration by poor performance on this ballot (not expiration).

The BBWAA election rules remained identical to those that were in effect for the most recent elections. The BBWAA voted at the 2016 winter meetings to make all Hall of Fame ballots public one week after the results were announced, effective with this election. However, the Hall rejected the BBWAA's proposal, and ballots remain confidential unless individual voters choose to reveal them (which is allowed by Hall of Fame rules).

Another recent rules change, announced in 2015, tightened the qualifications for the BBWAA electorate. Beginning with the 2016 election, eligible voters must not only have 10 years of continuous BBWAA membership, but also be currently active members, or have held active status within the 10 years prior to the election. A BBWAA member who has not been active for more than 10 years can regain voting status by covering MLB in the year preceding the election. As a result of the new rule, the vote total in 2016 decreased by 109 from the previous year, to 440.

The ballot included two categories of players:

- Candidates from the 2017 ballot who received at least 5% of the vote but were not elected, as long as they first appeared on the BBWAA ballot no earlier than 2009.
- Selected individuals, chosen by a screening committee, whose last MLB appearance was in 2012.

422 ballots were cast, 20 fewer than in 2017. There were 422 ballots cast, with a total of 3,570 votes for individual players, an average of 8.46 names per ballot—the highest per-ballot average since 1960 (8.51 votes per ballot).

Voting results from 2018:

Player	Votes	Percent	Change	Year
**Chipper Jones**†	410	97.2%	–	1st
**Vladimir Guerrero**	392	92.9%	▲21.2%	2nd
**Jim Thome**†	379	89.8%	–	1st
**Trevor Hoffman**	337	79.9%	▲5.9%	3rd
Edgar Martínez	297	70.4%	▲11.8%	9th
Mike Mussina	268	63.5%	▲11.7%	5th
Roger Clemens	242	57.3%	▲3.2%	6th
Barry Bonds	238	56.4%	▲2.6%	6th
Curt Schilling	216	51.2%	▲6.2%	6th
Omar Vizquel†	156	37.0%	–	1st
Larry Walker	144	34.1%	▲12.2%	8th
Fred McGriff	98	23.2%	▲1.5%	9th
Manny Ramirez	93	22.0%	▼1.8%	2nd
Jeff Kent	61	14.5%	▼2.2%	5th
Gary Sheffield	47	11.1%	▼2.2%	4th
Billy Wagner	47	11.1%	▲0.9%	3rd
Scott Rolen†	43	10.2%	–	1st
Sammy Sosa	33	7.8%	▼0.8%	6th
Andruw Jones†	31	7.3%	–	1st
Jamie Moyer†*	10	2.4%	–	1st
Johan Santana†*	10	2.4%	–	1st
Johnny Damon†*	8	1.9%	–	1st
Hideki Matsui†*	4	0.9%	–	1st
Chris Carpenter†*	2	0.5%	–	1st
Kerry Wood†*	2	0.5%	–	1st
Liván Hernández†*	1	0.2%	–	1st
Carlos Lee†*	1	0.2%	–	1st
Orlando Hudson†*	0	0%	–	1st
Aubrey Huff†*	0	0%	–	1st
Jason Isringhausen†*	0	0%	–	1st
Brad Lidge†*	0	0%	–	1st
Kevin Millwood†*	0	0%	–	1st
Carlos Zambrano†*	0	0%	–	1st

Players who were eligible for the first time in 2018 but were not on the ballot included Rod Barajas, Miguel Batista, Geoff Blum, Miguel Cairo, Aaron Cook, Francisco Cordero, Juan Cruz, Brian Fuentes, Bill Hall, Willie Harris, Nick Johnson, Adam Kennedy, Rodrigo López, Mike MacDougal, Guillermo Mota, Will Ohman, Vicente Padilla, Carl Pavano, Scott Podsednik, Juan Rivera, J. C. Romero, Brian Schneider, Ben Sheets, Jeff Suppan, Kip Wells, Dan Wheeler and Jack Wilson.

Scott Rolen's 10.2% was the lowest first-year vote percentage in history for a candidate who was eventually elected by the BBWAA. He was voted in on the 2023 ballot.

== Modern Baseball Era Committee ==
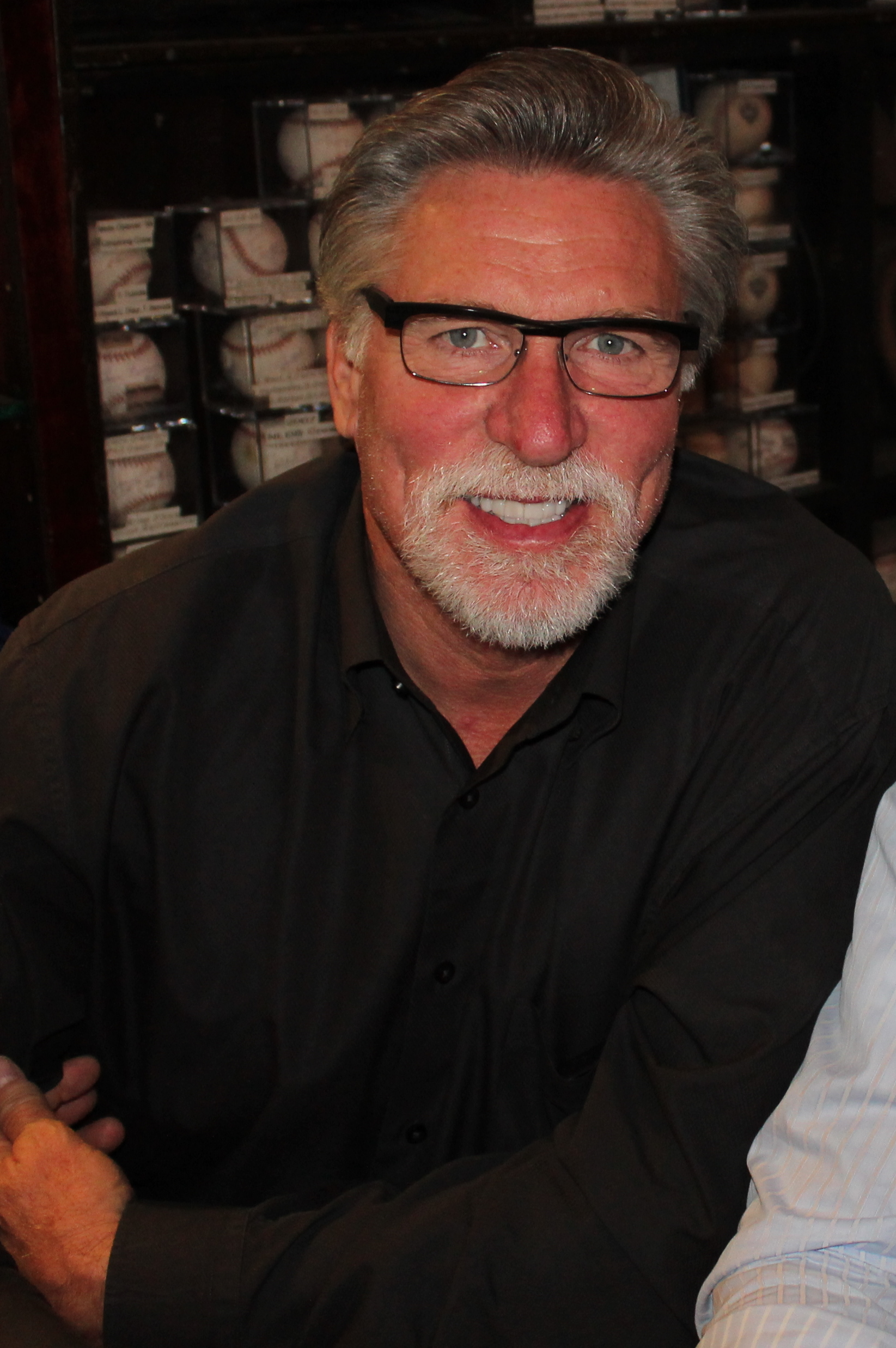
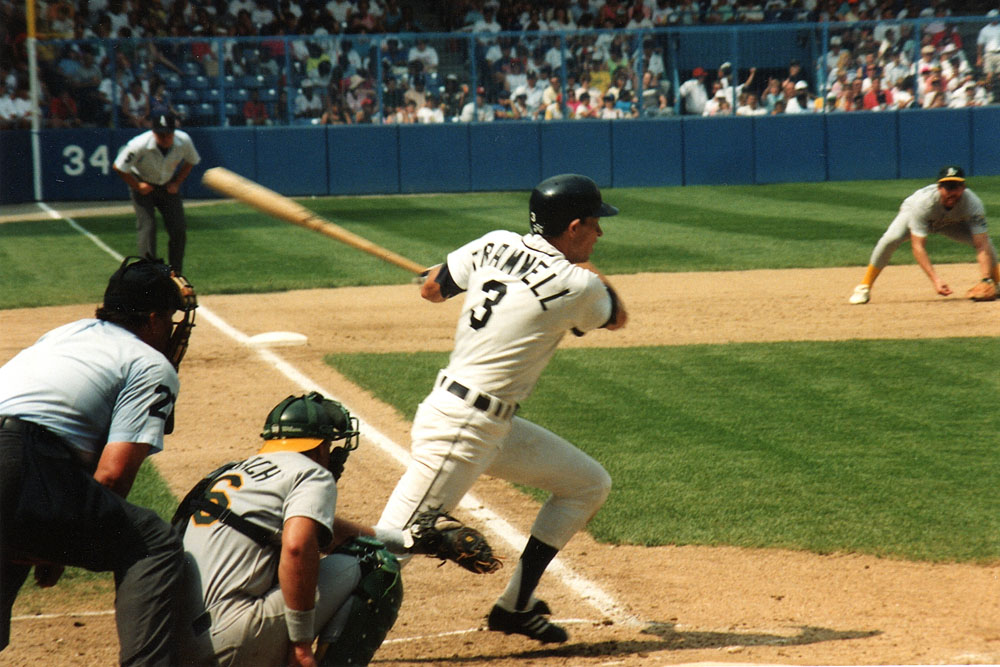
2018 Era Committee inductees Jack Morris (left) and Alan Trammell

On July 23, 2016, the Hall of Fame announced changes to the Era Committee system. The system's timeframes were restructured to place a greater emphasis on the modern game, and to reduce the frequency at which individuals from the pre-1970 game (including Negro league baseball figures) will have their careers reviewed. Considering candidates whose greatest contributions occurred from 1970 to 1987, the Modern Baseball Era Committee met in 2017 as part of the elections for the next calendar year.

On November 6, 2017, the Hall announced the 10 candidates to be considered when the Modern Baseball Era Committee met at the 2017 winter meetings near Walt Disney World on December 10, with the voting results announced immediately after the committee met. The cutoff for election and induction remained the standard 75%, or 12 of 16 votes.

The committee consisted of the following individuals:

- Hall of Famers: George Brett, Rod Carew, Bobby Cox, Dennis Eckersley, John Schuerholz, Don Sutton, Dave Winfield, Robin Yount
- Executives: Sandy Alderson, Paul Beeston, Bob Castellini, David Glass, Bill DeWitt
- Media and historians: Bob Elliott, Steve Hirdt, Jayson Stark
- Non-voting committee chair: Jane Forbes Clark (Hall of Fame chairman)

Candidate	Category	Votes	Percent	Ref
Jack Morris	Player	14	87.5%	
Alan Trammell	Player	13	81.25%	
Ted Simmons	Player	11	68.75%	
Marvin Miller	Executive	7	43.75%	
Steve Garvey	Player	<7		
Tommy John	Player	<7		
Don Mattingly	Player	<7		
Dale Murphy	Player	<7		
Dave Parker	Player	<7		
Luis Tiant	Player	<7		

All candidates except Miller were living when the ballot and voting results were announced. Mattingly, Morris, Murphy and Trammell were being considered for the first time; the others had been considered at least once by one of the predecessors to this committee. Garvey, John, Miller, Parker and Simmons were most recently considered in 2014 by the former Expansion Era Committee, and Tiant was most recently considered by the former Golden Era Committee in 2015. Among players, Simmons was the only candidate who was not on the BBWAA ballot for the full 15-year period formerly allowed by Hall rules; he received less than 5% when he debuted on the BBWAA ballot in 1994 and thus did not appear on further ballots. The Hall changed the eligibility period to 10 years starting with the 2015 election, but Trammell and Mattingly (who were then past the new 10-year cutoff) retained their original 15-year eligibility window.

== J. G. Taylor Spink Award ==
The J. G. Taylor Spink Award has been presented by the BBWAA at the annual summer induction ceremonies since 1962. Through 2010, it was awarded during the main induction ceremony, but is now given the previous day at the Hall of Fame Awards Presentation. It recognizes a sportswriter "for meritorious contributions to baseball writing". The recipients are not members of the Hall of Fame but are featured in a permanent exhibit at the National Baseball Museum.

The three finalists for the 2018 award were announced during the 2017 All-Star break.

- Sheldon Ocker, Akron Beacon-Journal (retired)
- Jim Reeves, Fort Worth Star-Telegram
- Patrick Reusse, Star Tribune (Minneapolis)

Ocker was announced as the recipient during the 2017 winter meetings on December 12. He covered the Cleveland Indians for more than three decades, serving as Cleveland Indians beat reporter for the Beacon-Journal from 1981 until his retirement at the end of the 2013 season. Ocker received 168 of the 426 ballots cast (including two blanks) to Reeves' 143 and Reusse's 113.

== Ford C. Frick Award ==
Various changes in July 2016 were also made to the annual Ford C. Frick Award elections, presented annually to a preeminent baseball broadcaster since 1978. According to the Hall, the new criteria for selection are "Commitment to excellence, quality of broadcasting abilities, reverence within the game, popularity with fans, and recognition by peers."

Additionally, a ballot of eight candidates will now be set, down from 10 in years past. The three ballot slots previously determined by fan voting on Facebook will now be filled by a committee of historians.

A new election cycle has been established, rotating annually between Current Major League Markets (team-specific announcers) with the 2017 Frick Award; National Voices (broadcasters whose contributions were realized on a national level) with the 2018 Frick Award; and Broadcasting Beginnings (early team voices and pioneers of baseball broadcasting) with the 2019 Frick Award. This cycle will repeat every three years.

The Hall announced the following finalists for the 2018 Ford C. Frick Award on October 23, 2017.

- Buddy Blattner
- Joe Buck
- Bob Costas
- Dizzy Dean
- Don Drysdale
- Al Michaels
- Joe Morgan
- Pee Wee Reese

Four finalists were members of the Hall of Fame as players—Dean, Drysdale, Morgan and Reese. When the ballot was announced, Buck, Costas, Michaels and Morgan were still alive. The other four were deceased.

Costas was announced as the recipient at the 2017 winter meetings on December 13. He began his sportscasting career as a play-by-play caller for the Spirits of St. Louis in the American Basketball Association, and went from there to calling NBA and NFL games for CBS, but made his greatest mark as part of NBC's broadcast team for its national MLB telecasts from 1982 to 2009. Costas then joined the MLB Network, where he was serving as the network's documentary host when he was announced as the Frick Award recipient.
