= 2023 Baseball Hall of Fame balloting =

Elections to the Baseball Hall of Fame

National Baseball

Hall of Fame and Museum
- New inductees: 2
- via BBWAA: 1
- via Contemporary Baseball Era Committee: 1
- Total inductees: 342
- Induction date: July 23, 2023

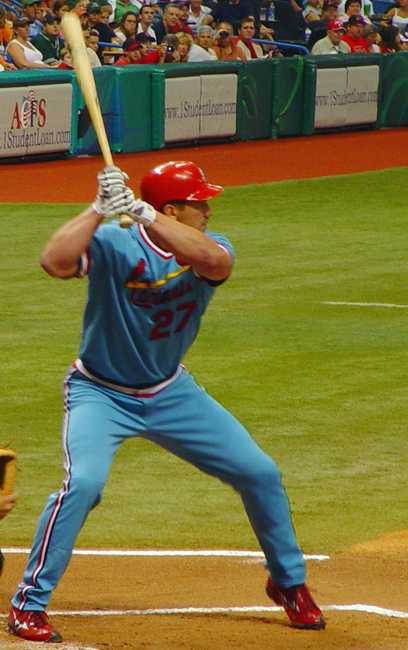
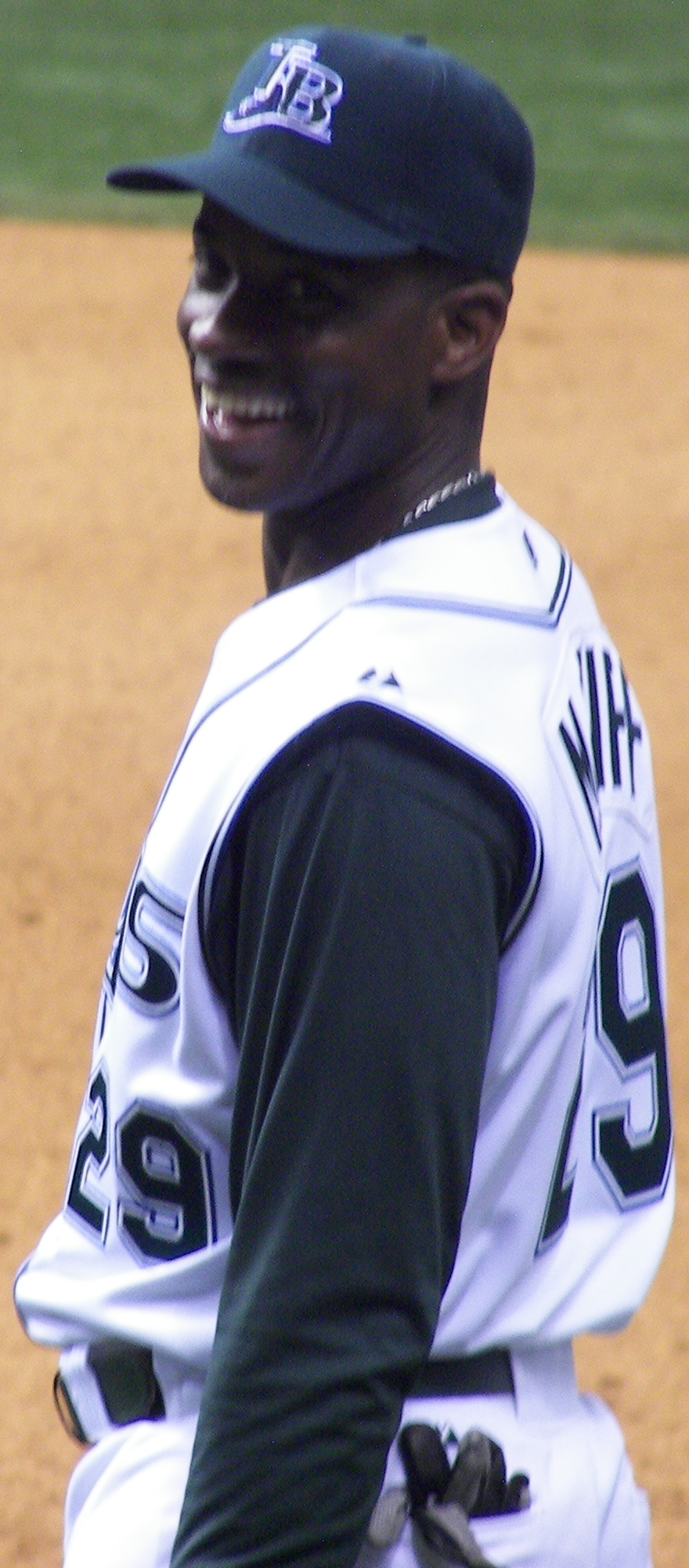
2023 inductees Scott Rolen (left) and Fred McGriff

Elections to the Baseball Hall of Fame for 2023 were conducted according to the rules most recently amended in 2022. As in the past, the Baseball Writers' Association of America (BBWAA) voted by mail to select from a ballot of recently retired players, with the results announced on January 24. Scott Rolen, in his sixth year of eligibility, was the only player elected from the BBWAA ballot. Rolen had received 10.2% of the vote in his first year on the ballot in 2018, the lowest first-year percentage ever for a candidate eventually voted in by the BBWAA before Andruw Jones' election in 2026.

A meeting of the players' Contemporary Baseball Era committee—one of a group of three rotating bodies generally referred to as the Veterans Committee and whose structure was amended in April 2022—was held in December 2022 to consider players from the era beginning in 1980 who no longer appear on the BBWAA ballot. Fred McGriff was the only player elected from the Veterans Committee ballot.

== BBWAA election ==
The list of players appearing on the BBWAA ballot was released on November 21, 2022; the results were announced on January 24, 2023. There were 14 players carried over from the 2022 ballot, who garnered at least 5% of the vote and were still eligible for election, as well as 14 players whose last major league appearance was in 2017 and were chosen by a screening committee. This was the final ballot for Jeff Kent. A total of 389 ballots were cast, with 292 votes needed to reach the 75% threshold for election. A total of 2,281 votes were cast for individual players, an average of 5.86 votes per ballot.

Hall of Fame voting results for class of 2023
Player	Votes	Percent	Change	Year
**Scott Rolen**	297	76.3%	▲13.1%	6th
Todd Helton	281	72.2%	▲20.2%	5th
Billy Wagner	265	68.1%	▲17.1%	8th
Andruw Jones	226	58.1%	▲16.7%	6th
Gary Sheffield	214	55.0%	▲14.4%	9th
Carlos Beltrán†	181	46.5%	–	1st
Jeff Kent	181	46.5%	▲13.8%	10th
Alex Rodriguez	139	35.7%	▲1.4%	2nd
Manny Ramirez	129	33.2%	▲4.3%	7th
Omar Vizquel	76	19.5%	▼4.4%	6th
Andy Pettitte	66	17.0%	▲3.3%	5th
Bobby Abreu	60	15.4%	▲6.8%	4th
Jimmy Rollins	50	12.9%	▲3.5%	2nd
Mark Buehrle	42	10.8%	▲5.0%	3rd
Francisco Rodríguez†	42	10.8%	–	1st
Torii Hunter	27	6.9%	▲1.6%	3rd
Bronson Arroyo†*	1	0.3%	–	1st
R. A. Dickey†*	1	0.3%	–	1st
John Lackey†*	1	0.3%	–	1st
Mike Napoli†*	1	0.3%	–	1st
Huston Street†*	1	0.3%	–	1st
Matt Cain†*	0	0.0%	–	1st
Jacoby Ellsbury†*	0	0.0%	–	1st
Andre Ethier†*	0	0.0%	–	1st
J. J. Hardy†*	0	0.0%	–	1st
Jhonny Peralta†*	0	0.0%	–	1st
Jered Weaver†*	0	0.0%	–	1st
Jayson Werth†*	0	0.0%	–	1st

Key
	Elected to the Hall of Fame on this ballot (named in **bold italics**).
	Elected subsequently, as of 2026 (named in plain italics).
	Renominated for the 2024 BBWAA election by adequate performance on this ballot and has not subsequently been eliminated.
	Eliminated from annual BBWAA consideration by poor performance or expiration on subsequent ballots.
	Eliminated from annual BBWAA consideration by poor performance or expiration on this ballot.
†	First time on the BBWAA ballot.
*	Eliminated from annual BBWAA consideration by poor performance on this ballot (not expiration).

Players who met first-year eligibility requirements but were not selected by the screening committee for inclusion on the ballot were: Mike Avilés, Erick Aybar, Joaquín Benoit, Andrés Blanco, Joe Blanton, Craig Breslow, Jonathan Broxton, Alejandro De Aza, Stephen Drew, Yunel Escobar, Scott Feldman, Matt Garza, Jason Grilli, Jeremy Guthrie, Franklin Gutiérrez, Ryan Hanigan, Aaron Hill, J. P. Howell, Ubaldo Jiménez, Kyle Kendrick, Adam Lind, Dustin McGowan, Michael Morse, Brandon Moss, Edward Mujica, Ricky Nolasco, Eric O'Flaherty, Mike Pelfrey, Glen Perkins, Chad Qualls, Ryan Raburn, Carlos Ruiz, Seth Smith, Geovany Soto, Rickie Weeks and Chris Young.

== Contemporary Baseball Era Committee ==
The Contemporary Baseball Era Committee met on December 4 at baseball's winter meetings in San Diego to consider candidates from the era beginning in 1980, players who have been retired at least fifteen years and played most of their careers after 1980. The 16-member committee considered a ballot including eight former players, announced on November 7. Players needed 75% or more of the committee vote in order to be eligible for induction into the Hall of Fame.

Fred McGriff was the only player to be inducted, garnering unanimous support from the 16-member committee.

Candidate	Votes	Percent
**Fred McGriff**	16	100%
Don Mattingly	8	50%
Curt Schilling	7	43.75%
Dale Murphy	6	37.5%
Albert Belle	<4	
Barry Bonds	<4	
Roger Clemens	<4	
Rafael Palmeiro	<4	

Key
Elected to the Hall of Fame on this ballot (named in **bold italics**).
Elected subsequently, as of 2026 (named in plain italics).
Ineligible for the 2026 Veterans Committee election by poor performance on this ballot and has not subsequently been eliminated.
Eliminated from triennial Veterans Committee consideration by poor performance on subsequent ballots.
Eliminated from triennial Veterans Committee consideration by poor performance on this ballot.

The committee consisted of the following individuals:

- Hall of Famers: Greg Maddux, Jack Morris, Ryne Sandberg, Lee Smith, Frank Thomas, Alan Trammell
- Executives: Paul Beeston, Theo Epstein, Derrick Hall, (Note: Hall replaced Chipper Jones, who had to withdraw from the committee due to illness) Arte Moreno, Kim Ng, Dave St. Peter, Ken Williams
- Media and historians: Steve Hirdt, La Velle Neal, Susan Slusser

== Ford C. Frick Award ==
The 2023 Ford C. Frick Award will be bestowed as part of the Awards Presentation.

In April 2022, the Baseball Hall of Fame announced changes to the Ford C. Frick Award selection process. The size of the ballot was increased from eight to ten nominees, while also requiring that at least one candidate be a foreign-language broadcaster. The election cycle was also revised, effective with the 2023 balloting: four consecutive elections will have a composite ballot of local and national broadcasters, followed by one election for broadcasters whose careers ended prior to 1994. The announced finalists were:

- Dave Campbell (born 1942), Colorado Rockies broadcaster, MLB player 1967–1974
- Joe Castiglione (born 1947), Boston Red Sox broadcaster
- Gary Cohen (born 1958), New York Mets broadcaster
- Jacques Doucet (born 1940), Montreal Expos and Toronto Blue Jays broadcaster
- Tom Hamilton (born 1954), Cleveland Guardians broadcaster
- Jerry Howarth (born 1946), Toronto Blue Jays broadcaster
- Pat Hughes (born 1955), Chicago Cubs broadcaster
- Ernie Johnson Sr. (1924–2011), Atlanta Braves broadcaster, MLB player 1950, 1952–1959
- Duane Kuiper (born 1950), San Francisco Giants and Colorado Rockies broadcaster, MLB player 1974–1985
- Steve Stone (born 1947), Chicago Cubs and Chicago White Sox broadcaster, MLB player 1971–1981

On December 7, 2022, the Hall of Fame announced that Pat Hughes won the Frick Award.

== BBWAA Career Excellence Award ==
The 2023 BBWAA Career Excellence Award will also be bestowed as part of the Awards Presentation, honoring a baseball writer "for meritorious contributions to baseball writing". On December 6, 2022, the Hall of Fame announced that retired sportswriter John Lowe won the award. Lowe, who wrote for The Philadelphia Inquirer and Detroit Free Press, invented the quality start statistic in 1985.
