= Fred McGriff =

American baseball player (born 1963)

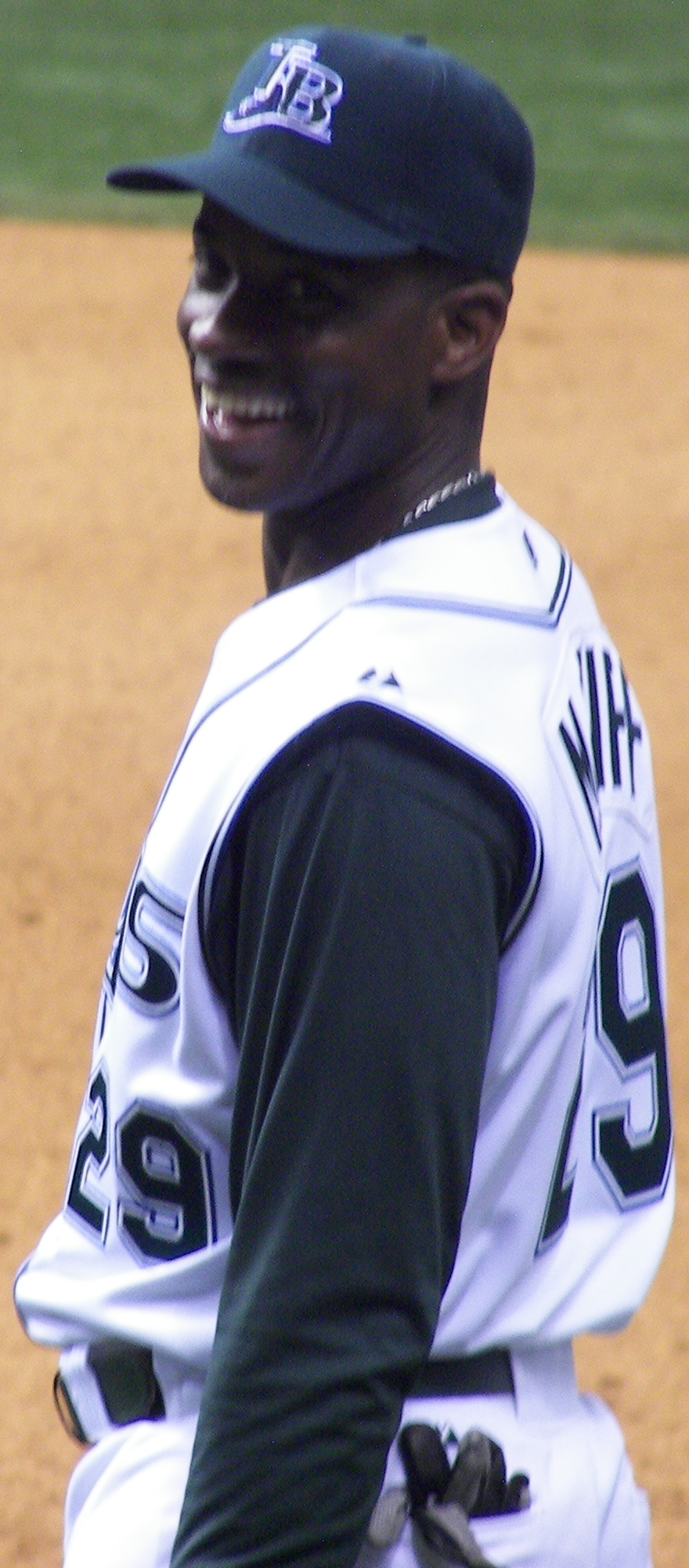
- McGriff with the Tampa Bay Devil Rays in 2007
- First baseman
- Born: October 31, 1963 (age 62); Tampa, Florida, U.S.
- Batted: Left Threw: Left

MLB debut
- May 17, 1986, for the Toronto Blue Jays

Last MLB appearance
- July 15, 2004, for the Tampa Bay Devil Rays

MLB statistics
- Batting average: .284
- Hits: 2,490
- Home runs: 493
- Runs batted in: 1,550
- Stats at Baseball Reference

Teams
- Toronto Blue Jays (1986–1990); San Diego Padres (1991–1993); Atlanta Braves (1993–1997); Tampa Bay Devil Rays (1998–2001); Chicago Cubs (2001–2002); Los Angeles Dodgers (2003); Tampa Bay Devil Rays (2004)

Career highlights and awards
- 5× All-Star (1992, 1994–1996, 2000); World Series champion (1995); 3× Silver Slugger Award (1989, 1992, 1993); 2× Home run leader (1989, 1992); Tampa Bay Rays Hall of Fame

Member of the National

Baseball Hall of Fame
- Induction: 2023
- Vote: 100%
- Election method: Contemporary Baseball Era Committee

Frederick Stanley McGriff (born October 31, 1963) is an American former first baseman in Major League Baseball (MLB) who played for six teams from 1986 through 2004. Nicknamed "Crime Dog", a word play on McGruff the Crime Dog, he was one of the most consistently productive power hitters of the 1990s. McGriff posted over 80 runs batted in (RBI) every year from 1988 through 2002, and became the first player since the dead-ball era to lead both leagues in home runs — the American League (AL) in 1989 and the National League (NL) in 1992. A five-time All-Star, he was named the Most Valuable Player of the 1994 contest after his pinch-hit home run in the bottom of the ninth inning tied the score at 7–7, with the NL winning in 10 innings. McGriff finished in the top ten in voting for his league's Most Valuable Player Award every year from 1989 through 1994, during which time he led the major leagues in home runs.

After spending the first third of his career with the Toronto Blue Jays and San Diego Padres, McGriff became a major component in the Atlanta Braves' long run of division champions, posting over 90 RBI for five straight years after joining the club in a midseason 1993 trade, and helped lead the team to the 1995 World Series title over the Cleveland Indians. In 50 career postseason games, McGriff batted .303 with 10 home runs and 37 RBI. He then joined his hometown Tampa Bay Devil Rays when that club was established in 1998, and was the team's main power hitter for its first four seasons, establishing various franchise records which lasted several years before being broken. He hit 20 or more home runs fifteen times, becoming the first player to hit 30 home runs with five different teams, drove in 100 runs eight times, and batted .300 four times.

McGriff's 493 career home runs were tied for tenth in major league history among left-handed hitters when he retired, and put him only seven away from joining the 500 home run club; his 462 home runs as a first baseman ranked fourth. He also ended his career with 1,550 RBI, and a .509 slugging percentage. One of the most durable first basemen in history, he ranked third in career games at first base (2,239), ninth in assists (1,447) and third in double plays (1,775). In 2023, McGriff was inducted into the Baseball Hall of Fame.

== Early life ==
McGriff was born in Tampa, Florida. His mother, Eliza, was a schoolteacher and his father, Earl, was an electronics repairman. As a child, he hung out at Al Lopez Field during Cincinnati Reds spring training and worked as a vendor at Tampa Stadium.

McGriff went out for the baseball team at Jefferson High School as a sophomore but was cut. He made the team the following year after undergoing a growth spurt. He was a high school teammate of Al Pardo. He first attracted the attention of professional ball clubs after hitting a long home run off of Hillsborough High School's Dwight Gooden with scouts in attendance to watch Gooden pitch. McGriff accepted a scholarship offer to play college baseball for the Georgia Bulldogs.

== Professional career ==
=== Draft and minor leagues (1981–1985) ===
McGriff signed with the New York Yankees after being selected in the 9th round of the 1981 amateur draft. He received a $20,000 signing bonus. In 1982, the Yankees dealt McGriff, Dave Collins and Mike Morgan to the Toronto Blue Jays for Dale Murray and Tom Dodd. The trade is now considered one of the most one-sided deals in baseball history; in 2006, Rob Neyer wrote that the trade looked particularly lopsided because it was one of the few instances that a player of McGriff's stature was traded before getting to the majors.

At the time, the trade appeared to make some sense from the Yankees' perspective, since McGriff was blocked from first base by Don Mattingly. Nonetheless, the Yankees didn't get nearly enough in return. Murray won only three games in three years with the Yankees, and was out of baseball by 1986. Dodd was released at the end of the season, and apart from a month with the Baltimore Orioles in 1986 spent the remainder of his career in the minors. Before McGriff became a regular major leaguer, baseball great Ted Williams took note of his power at a batting practice session during spring training. Williams was drawn to McGriff when he heard the sound of the ball leaving McGriff's bat.

To improve his skills, McGriff also played for three seasons in the Baseball Winter League of the Dominican Republic for the teams Azucareros del Este (today Toros del Este), Leones del Escogido and Caimanes del Sur (defunct franchise), between 1984 and 1987. He won a Golden Glove in that league during the 1986-87 season and went to the league's postseason in the 1984-85 campaign.

=== Toronto Blue Jays (1986–1990) ===
McGriff played two innings at first base on May 17, 1986, and the next day started his first career game as the designated hitter. His first at-bat was in the bottom of the second inning against Don Schulze, during which he hit a line drive to left field for his first career hit. McGriff played in only one more MLB game that season.

McGriff reached the majors full-time in 1987, and hit 34 home runs the next year, his first of seven consecutive seasons with over 30 homers. He emerged as the top power hitter in the American League in 1989, leading the league with 36 home runs, including the first home run hit at the SkyDome, helping the Blue Jays win the AL East division title. His power numbers remained steady in 1990, as McGriff batted .300 and established himself as a consistent producer.

=== San Diego Padres (1990–1993) ===
On December 5, 1990, the Blue Jays traded McGriff and Tony Fernández to the San Diego Padres in exchange for Roberto Alomar and Joe Carter.

McGriff hit .278/.396/.474 for San Diego in 1991. He made his first All-Star appearance the following year and led the NL in home runs in 1992, three years after he had accomplished the same feat in the AL.

=== Atlanta Braves (1993–1997) ===
On July 18, 1993, the Padres, out of contention and seeking to unload their high-priced veterans, dealt McGriff to the Atlanta Braves for prospect Vince Moore, Donnie Elliott and Melvin Nieves. McGriff hit a home run in his first game with the Braves, who acquired him to replace the struggling Sid Bream at first and to provide an offensive spark, and was a key player in the Braves' 51–19 finish to overtake the San Francisco Giants and claim first place in the National League West for a third consecutive season. He finished with a career high 37 homers and fourth place in the NL MVP voting.

In the strike-shortened 1994 season, McGriff was batting .318 and had 34 home runs when play ended in August 1994. He won the All-Star Game MVP Award that year after hitting the game-tying home run for the National League, after the NL trailed, 7–5, in the bottom of the ninth inning. McGriff was runner-up to Ken Griffey Jr. in the 1994 Home Run Derby.

McGriff remained with the Braves in 1995 and continued to be a successful cleanup hitter. He hit two home runs in the 1995 World Series en route to his only World Series championship ring.

A free agent after the 1995 season, McGriff signed a four-year contract worth $20 million with the Braves. McGriff hit .295/.365/.494 with a career-best 107 RBIs on his way to another World Series appearance in 1996. McGriff hit 22 home runs in the 1997 season. He was called out on strikes by umpire Eric Gregg on a pitch thrown by Liván Hernández during the 1997 NLCS, which was the last significant event for McGriff as a member of the Braves. The team allowed him to be picked up by the expansion Tampa Bay Devil Rays after the season.

=== Tampa Bay Devil Rays (1998–2001) ===
The Braves did not protect McGriff in the 1997 expansion draft after the season, and he was not selected. The Braves traded McGriff to the expansion Tampa Bay Devil Rays for a player to be named later after the draft.

McGriff batted .278 with nineteen home runs in his first season with the Devil Rays. His numbers experienced a minor renaissance in 1999 when he hit .310 with 32 home runs the following season.

=== Chicago Cubs (2001–2002) ===
After another solid season in 2000, McGriff got off to a good start in 2001 and was heavily pursued by the contending Chicago Cubs around the trade deadline. He waived his no-trade clause to allow himself to be dealt to Chicago on July 27, 2001, for Manny Aybar and a player to be named later. He hit .282 with twelve homers in 49 games with the Cubs, but the team did not reach the postseason.

=== Los Angeles Dodgers (2003) ===
McGriff had thirty home runs during a strong 2002 campaign, which earned him a one-year contract with the Los Angeles Dodgers for the 2003 season. Twenty-two homers shy of 500 for his career, the forty-year-old McGriff only hit thirteen with a .249 batting average and spent a significant amount of time on the disabled list.

=== Return to the Devil Rays (2004) ===
During spring training in 2004, the Devil Rays re-signed McGriff. He ended up with a .181 average and had hit just two home runs in his sporadic play from the end of May until mid-July. The Devil Rays released McGriff on July 28, 2004, seven home runs shy of 500.

McGriff worked out for the New York Yankees three days after his release from Tampa Bay but the team ultimately didn't sign him. McGriff officially declared his retirement during spring training of 2005 when he received no calls from any teams requesting his services.

== Post-playing career ==
In January 2007, McGriff joined the Devil Rays as a special adviser. He stayed with the Rays until 2010. McGriff joined the Braves as a special assistant to the baseball operations department in 2015, working with their minor league players.

== Legacy ==
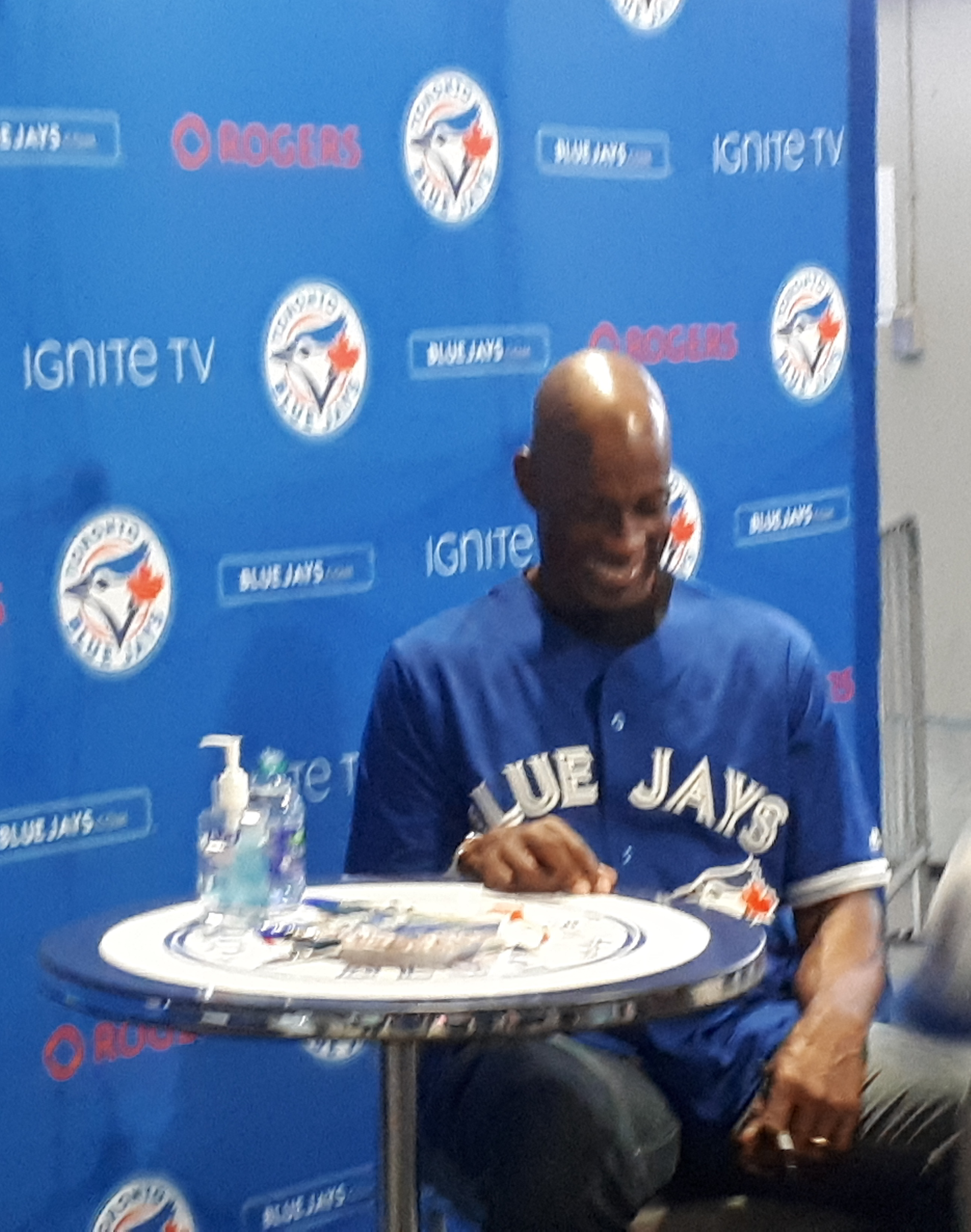
McGriff at Rogers Centre in 2019

McGriff ended his career with ten seasons of at least thirty home runs. He and Gary Sheffield are the only players ever to hit at least thirty home runs in one season for five different teams, with McGriff accomplishing the feat with Toronto three times, San Diego twice, and Atlanta, Tampa Bay, and the Chicago Cubs once each. He led MLB in total home runs hit from 1989 to 1994, and hit the third-most home runs in the decade from 1988 to 1997 (after Barry Bonds and Mark McGwire). During the latter period, he was eighth in the majors in the fWAR statistic (Wins Above Replacement as calculated by FanGraphs), behind six Hall of Famers and Bonds.

As of 2019, McGriff stood as one of only 16 players to record a career .280 batting average, .375 on-base percentage, and .500 slugging percentage along with at least 490 home runs.

He became eligible for election to the National Baseball Hall of Fame in 2010. In his first year of eligibility, he was named on 21.5% of the ballots cast by 10-year members of the Baseball Writers' Association of America (BBWAA); this fell short of the 75% requirement for induction, but surpassed the 5.0% threshold for continued eligibility on future BBWAA ballots. Over the next four elections, McGriff's vote percentage ranged from a high of 23.9% (137 votes) in 2012 to a low of 11.7% (67 votes) in 2014. He remained eligible through 2019, when his time on the ballot expired after ten unsuccessful appearances. On his final ballot, McGriff achieved his highest vote total ever of 39.8% (169 votes), still short of the necessary 75%.

On December 4, 2022, it was announced that McGriff was unanimously elected by the Contemporary Era Committee to the Baseball Hall of Fame. McGriff and Scott Rolen were formally inducted into the Hall of Fame on July 23, 2023.

During the press conference for his acceptance into the Baseball Hall Of Fame, McGriff highlighted going to the Dominican Republic to play winter baseball just before and after his Major League debut with the Blue Jays in 1986. “It was the best thing I ever did because I got a chance to get extra at-bats. In that winter ball, they take things very seriously. And you were facing José Rijo, Mario Soto, great pitchers," he said. He went on to encourage players who are starting their careers to play there.

== Personal life ==
McGriff married Veronica in 1988. The couple raised two children. McGriff lived in a custom-built home in Tampa from the mid-1990s to 2019, when it was sold.

McGriff's father Earl died of cancer in November 1999. His mother died in 2017.

McGriff appeared in commercials for Tom Emanski's Baseball Fundamentals training videos in 1991. The commercials ran for over a decade on ESPN, making them the longest running sports infomercial on television.

McGriff is a cousin of former Major Leaguers Charles Johnson and Terry McGriff.

== See also ==
- List of Major League Baseball home run records
- List of Major League Baseball career home run leaders
- List of Major League Baseball career hits leaders
- List of Major League Baseball career doubles leaders
- List of Major League Baseball career runs scored leaders
- List of Major League Baseball career runs batted in leaders
- List of Major League Baseball annual home run leaders
- List of Major League Baseball career total bases leaders

Awards and achievements
Preceded by José Canseco	American League Player of the Month; April 1989	Succeeded by Ron Kittle
Preceded by Andrés Galarraga	National League Player of the Month; July 1993	Succeeded by Tony Gwynn
