= Tom Emanski =

American baseball coach

- Born: Thomas Jerome Emanski; February 1948 (age 78)
- Occupations: Baseball coach; baseball scout
- Years active: 1982–2003

Thomas Jerome Emanski (born February 1948) is an American baseball coach and former Major League scout. He is best known for his coaching instructional videos, whose advertisements were ubiquitous on ESPN in the late 1990s.

== Early life ==
Emanski grew up in the Scranton/Wilkes-Barre region of northeastern Pennsylvania. After high school, he moved to Florida, where he worked assembling mainframe computers for IBM while coaching youth baseball and football.

== Career ==
=== Coaching ===
By the early 1980s, Emanski was well-known in Florida baseball circles, running coaching seminars and studying the mechanics of baseball using techniques he had learned at IBM. In 1986, he opened Baseball World, a youth baseball school in Maitland, Florida, where he tested his methods on his students. His teams found success, winning back-to-back-to-back Amateur Athletic Union (AAU) national youth championships in three divisions: 12 and under (1990), 13 and under/under '90 (1991), and 11 and under (1992). Emanski also coached the 1996 Junior Pan American team to two wins against Cuba and the gold medal.

From the mid-1980s to the mid-1990s, Emanski worked as a scout for the New York Yankees, Pittsburgh Pirates, and Houston Astros. He gave his last interview in 2003 and has avoided press attention in retirement.

=== Instructional videos ===
In 1986, Emanski produced his first instructional video, Mechanics of the Major League Swing. More titles followed, which were advertised on television in select regional markets, such as Houston and Florida, and sold well. The commercials featured youth players running Emanski's drills, the use of which produced "back-to-back-to-back AAU national championship teams." The advertisements also featured endorsements from Fred McGriff, recorded in a single day in 1991, whose swing Emanski had analyzed when the slugger was in the minor leagues. McGriff admitted in 2021 that had never seen the videos he endorsed. In 1997, Emanski struck a deal with ESPN to advertise his videos, with the network receiving as much as a third of each sale. The commercials ran an estimated 50,000 times on ESPN from June 14, 1997 to January 2, 2007.

The frequent commercial airings made the Emanski videos fodder for sports analysts lampooning a lack of fundamental play in professional baseball players. For example, Jayson Stark said the St. Louis Cardinals' poor defensive display in the 2002 National League Championship Series "[wouldn't] be recommended by Tom Emanski." A 2005 New York Times article suggested that New York Yankees third baseman Alex Rodriguez spend $29.95 and "buy the eminent baseball instructor Tom Emanski's DVD, Teaching the Mechanics of the Major League Swing II."

== Videography ==
- Mechanics of the Major League Swing
- Dynamic Practice Organization
- Defensive Drills
- Defensive Strategies 101
- Mechanics of the Major League Catcher
- Mechanics of the Major League Pitcher
- Baseball Strength & Conditioning
- Major League Baserunner
- Professional Bunting
- Mechanics of the Major League Swing II
