= Scott Rolen =

American baseball player (born 1975)

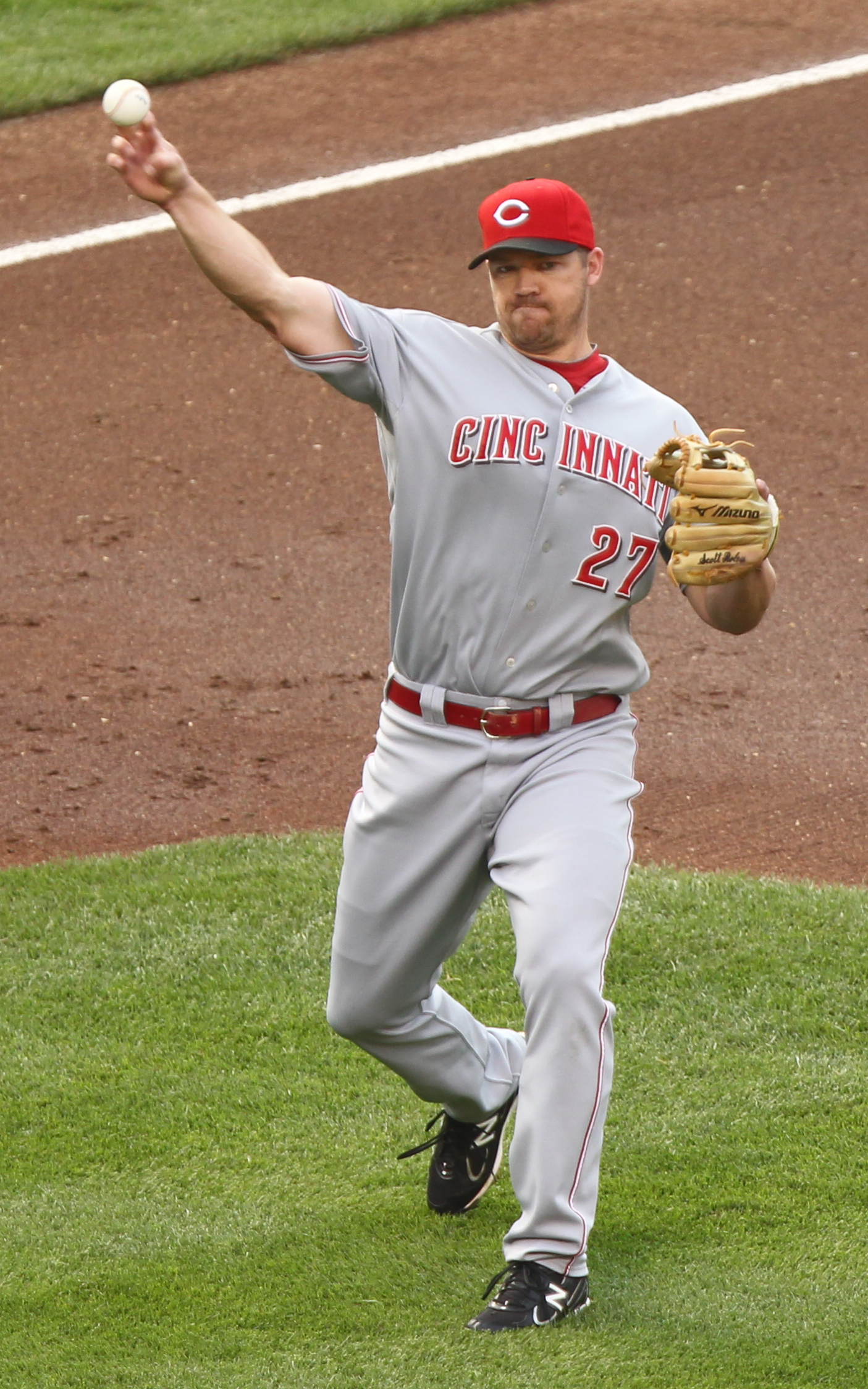
- Rolen with the Cincinnati Reds in 2011
- Third baseman
- Born: April 4, 1975 (age 51); Evansville, Indiana, U.S.
- Batted: Right Threw: Right

MLB debut
- August 1, 1996, for the Philadelphia Phillies

Last MLB appearance
- October 3, 2012, for the Cincinnati Reds

MLB statistics
- Batting average: .281
- Hits: 2,077
- Home runs: 316
- Runs batted in: 1,287
- Stats at Baseball Reference

Teams
- Philadelphia Phillies (1996–2002); St. Louis Cardinals (2002–2007); Toronto Blue Jays (2008–2009); Cincinnati Reds (2009–2012)

Career highlights and awards
- 7× All-Star (2002–2006, 2010, 2011); World Series champion (2006); NL Rookie of the Year (1997); 8× Gold Glove Award (1998, 2000–2004, 2006, 2010); Silver Slugger Award (2002); Philadelphia Phillies Wall of Fame; St. Louis Cardinals Hall of Fame

Member of the National

Baseball Hall of Fame
- Induction: 2023
- Vote: 76.3% (sixth ballot)

Scott Bruce Rolen (born April 4, 1975) is an American former professional baseball third baseman. He played 17 seasons in Major League Baseball (MLB) for the Philadelphia Phillies, St. Louis Cardinals, Toronto Blue Jays, and Cincinnati Reds from 1996 to 2012.

A seven-time All-Star, Rolen started his career with the Phillies, where he was named the 1997 National League Rookie of the Year. Rolen became known for two iconic postseason home runs with the Cardinals: a go-ahead hit off Roger Clemens in Game 7 of the 2004 NLCS and a Game 1 homer off Justin Verlander in the 2006 World Series. Regarded as one of the best defensive third basemen of all time, Rolen won eight Gold Glove Awards over his career, the fourth-most among third basemen. In 2023, Rolen was inducted into the Baseball Hall of Fame.

== Early life ==
Rolen was born in Evansville, Indiana, and attended Jasper High School in Jasper, Indiana. During his senior year at Jasper in 1993, he was named Indiana Mr. Baseball. He was also named to the Indiana high school basketball All-Star team.

== Career ==
=== Draft and minor leagues (1993–1996) ===
After a flurry of scholarship offers came in from schools like Oklahoma State and the University of Alabama, Rolen ultimately committed to playing college basketball for the Georgia Bulldogs. That commitment was complicated when the Philadelphia Phillies of Major League Baseball (MLB) selected Rolen in the second round of the 1993 MLB draft.

Rolen told reporters after the draft that he hoped he could forge a deal that would allow him to play for the Phillies farm system in the summer and on the Georgia basketball team in the winter. On July 22, however, Rolen chose to forego his commitment to Georgia to sign with the Phillies and focus on baseball; he was subsequently assigned to the Rookie-level Martinsville Phillies of the Appalachian League. He played 25 games in his first season of professional baseball, batting .313 with five doubles and 12 runs batted in (RBIs) in 80 at bats.

After attending spring training with the Phillies, Rolen opened the 1994 season with the Low A Spartanburg Phillies of the South Atlantic League. While his offensive metrics in Spartanburg were strong, batting .295 with 10 home runs, 30 doubles, and 61 RBIs by the last week of August, Rolen's 35 defensive errors in that same span caused concern among sports analysts. Manager Roy Majtyka defended Rolen's defensive performance, saying, "I've seen bad hops that hit him in the head be ruled an error. It's a joke. I honestly think you could take half of them away." Rolen was named Spartanburg's Most Valuable Player after batting .294 with 14 home runs and 72 RBIs, but he "wasn't satisfied with anything [he] did", telling reporters after the season, "I need to improve my entire game." When the minor league season concluded, Rolen participated in the 1994 Florida Instructional League to continue honing his sport.

As a minor league baseball player, Rolen was unaffected by the 1994–95 MLB strike, and he reported that April to the Class A-Advanced Clearwater Phillies of the Florida State League. He missed the first part of the season, however, with a fractured hook of hamate on his glove hand that required surgery. He was activated from the disabled list on June 6, hitting two home runs against the Brevard County Manatees in his first game back after the injury. The injury appeared to help Rolen's offensive performance, as it was less painful for him to hit a pitch well inside the strike zone than outside of it. After hitting .290 with ten home runs and 39 RBIs in 238 at bats in Clearwater, Rolen was promoted to the Double-A Reading Phillies of the Eastern League on August 16. He played in an additional 20 games after his promotion, batting .290 with three home runs and 15 RBIs in 76 at bats.

Rather than promoting Rolen directly to the major leagues, the Phillies chose to keep him in Reading for the start of the 1996 season, with Todd Zeile playing third base in Philadelphia. After recording nine home runs and 42 RBIs while leading the Eastern League by a .361 average, 83 hits, 22 doubles, a .568 slugging percentage, and 33 extra-base hits in 61 games for Reading, Rolen was promoted to the Triple-A Scranton/Wilkes-Barre Red Barons of the International League on June 13. Rolen's promotion coincided with a difficult stretch for the Phillies, and the team began planning at the end of June to call him up to Philadelphia after the All-Star Game break. He batted .274 in 45 games for Scranton, with two home runs and 19 RBIs in 168 at bats.

=== Philadelphia Phillies (1996–2002) ===
Rather than taking advantage of the MLB trading deadline to acquire new players for the struggling team, the Phillies chose to promote Rolen for his MLB debut on August 1, 1996. He debuted for the first game of a doubleheader against the St. Louis Cardinals, recording his first major league hit and error in the 2–1 Phillies victory. Rolen's first two home runs came on August 21 in a 6–0 shutout of the Los Angeles Dodgers. What should have been Rolen's rookie season came to a premature end on September 7, when he suffered a fractured right ulna after being hit by a pitch from Steve Trachsel in a 4–2 Philadelphia victory over the Chicago Cubs. Rolen finished the season batting .254 with four home runs and 18 RBIs in 130 at bats, the maximum threshold to be considered a rookie for the 1997 season. Had Rolen not fractured his arm in his final plate appearance, he would have been considered a 1996 rookie, but a hit by pitch does not count as an at bat, thus preserving his eligibility for the following season.

In the next season, he was named National League Rookie of the Year, becoming the first Phillie since Dick Allen in 1964 to win the award. In 1998, he won his first of eight Gold Glove awards. Only Hall of Famers Brooks Robinson (16), Mike Schmidt (10), and current Diamondbacks third baseman Nolan Arenado (10) have more at third base. Rolen was supposed to be one of the key pieces in the Phillies' revival. However, claiming that management was not trying hard enough to win, as well as having constant friction with manager Larry Bowa, Rolen demanded a trade. He was nearly traded to the Cincinnati Reds for prospect Brandon Larson, but the Reds' president John Allen killed the deal over financial concerns. Instead, on July 29, 2002, Philadelphia traded Rolen and Doug Nickle to the St. Louis Cardinals for Plácido Polanco, Mike Timlin, and Bud Smith. On September 25, 2002, Rolen signed an eight-year, $90 million extension with the Cardinals. Rolen was represented in negotiations by ACES Inc.

=== St. Louis Cardinals (2002–2007) ===
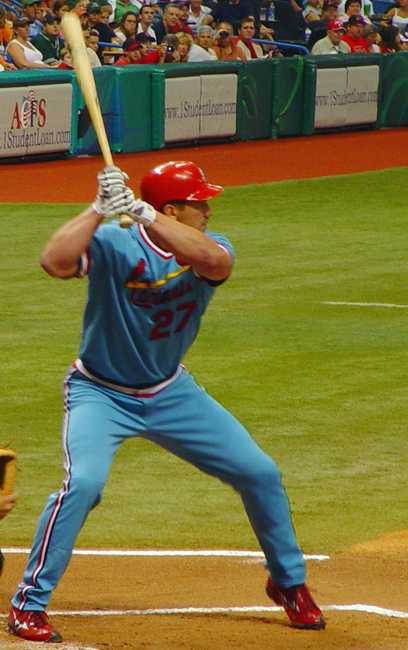
Rolen batting for the Cardinals in 2006

Rolen's 2004 season was one of his best. For much of the season, he led the National League in RBIs, often ranked among the league leaders in most offensive statistics, and had the highest vote total of any player for the All-Star Game. Despite being injured for the last stretch of the season, he finished the year with a career-high .314 batting average, 34 home runs, and 124 RBIs. He finished fourth in the National League MVP voting. Rolen, along with Albert Pujols and Jim Edmonds earned the nickname "MV3" for their outstanding 2004 seasons. The 2004 Cardinals won the National League Central Division with 105 wins. Rolen's two-run home run in the sixth inning of Game 7 of the NLCS against Roger Clemens won the National League pennant for St. Louis by defeating the Astros in seven games. However, the Boston Red Sox swept the Cardinals in four games to win the 2004 World Series.

On May 10, 2005, Rolen injured his shoulder in a collision with Dodgers first baseman Hee-Seop Choi and was placed on the disabled list two days later. He was expected to be out of action for up to six weeks. On May 13, he underwent shoulder surgery; an additional MRI revealed a tear in the labrum. He eventually opted to have season-ending surgery on his shoulder in August, rather than attempt to let it heal on its own and return for the playoffs. He finally returned to full-time duties in 2006, a year in which Rolen was one of six nominees for the National League Comeback Player of the Year award. He finished 2006 hitting .292, hitting 22 home runs and 95 RBIs. Rolen and the Cardinals won the 2006 World Series over the Detroit Tigers, with Rolen most notably hitting a game-tying home run in Game 1. On September 15, 2006, Rolen set a personal record for RBIs in a game with 7 in a 14–4 win against the San Francisco Giants, hitting two home runs.

The next year, however, Rolen faced more injury woes. He was placed on the 15-day disabled list on August 31, 2007, because of his recurring left shoulder problems. On September 11, Rolen had season-ending shoulder surgery "for the removal of scar tissue and a bursectomy and a manipulation of his left (non-throwing) shoulder".

=== Toronto Blue Jays (2008–2009) ===
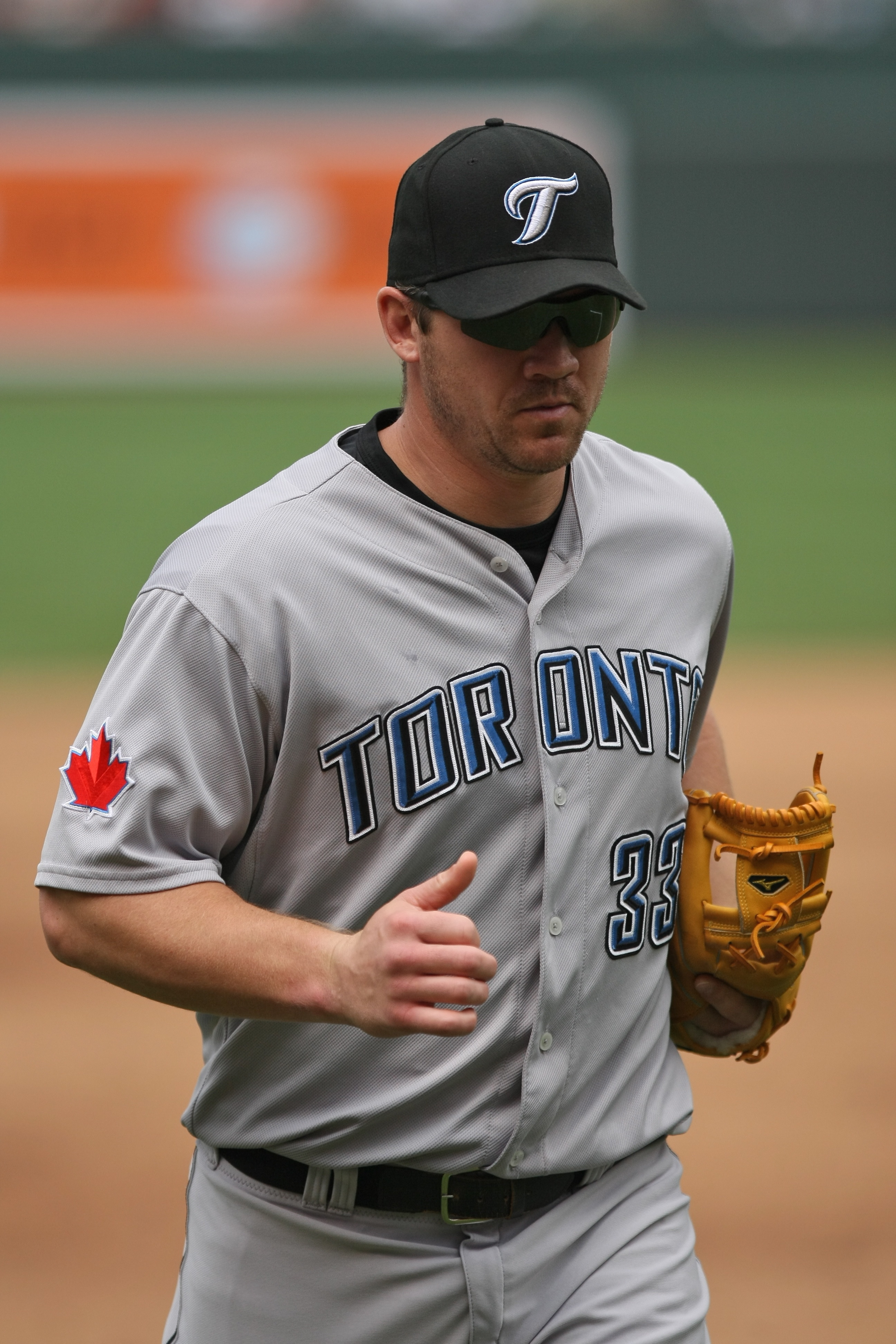
Rolen with the Toronto Blue Jays in May 2009

On January 12, 2008, the Cardinals reached a preliminary deal to send Rolen to the Toronto Blue Jays for Troy Glaus (which became finalized on January 14).

Rolen suffered a non-displaced fracture of his right middle finger during fielding drills at spring training. His fingernail was also torn off. As a result, Rolen missed the beginning of the regular season, having surgery to insert a screw in his broken finger. Marco Scutaro was the Blue Jays' third baseman in Rolen's place. On April 25, 2008, Rolen was activated from the 15-day disabled list. Two days later, against the Kansas City Royals, he hit his first home run as a Blue Jay.

After coming off another stint in the DL in late August, this time for his shoulder, he modified his batting stance by lowering his shoulders and arms by six inches, enabling him to reestablish his offensive power for the season's final month and hitting a couple of home runs at the comfort of less strain on the shoulder, which he had three prior surgeries to correct. He finished the year with a .262 batting average, 11 home runs and 50 RBIs in 115 games.

=== Cincinnati Reds (2009–2012) ===
On July 31, 2009, Rolen was traded to the Cincinnati Reds along with cash considerations for Edwin Encarnación, Josh Roenicke and Zach Stewart. During the 2010 season, Rolen regularly started at third base. He hit his 300th career home run on June 28, 2010, off Kyle Kendrick of the Philadelphia Phillies. His performance helped the Reds win the Central Division that year, their first division championship in 15 seasons. Rolen also won his eighth Gold Glove as a member of the Reds, the third team with which he received the award.

A middle-of-the-order hitter throughout his career, Rolen finished with a career .281 batting average, a .364 on-base percentage and a .490 slugging percentage. He had 2,077 hits, 316 home runs, and 1,287 RBIs, while scoring 1,211 runs. He finished with a career Wins Above Replacement (WAR) of 70.1, which ranks 10th all-time among third basemen.

On July 15, 2011, he became the fourth third baseman ever to have 2,000 hits, 500 doubles, 300 home runs and 1,200 RBIs, along with Mike Schmidt, George Brett, and Chipper Jones. Rolen ended his career with the 2012 National League Division Series, where a groundball error in Game 3 scored the go-ahead run for the San Francisco Giants when the Reds were one win away from the NLCS. With the potential in the ninth inning to tie or win in Game 5 by being at the plate with two runners on in a 6–4 game, Rolen struck out to clinch the series for the Giants.

Rolen did not attend 2013 spring training, but also did not announce his retirement.

== Charity work ==
In 1999, Rolen created The Enis Furley Foundation (named after one of Rolen's dogs), wanting to help children and their families who struggle with illness, hardship, or other special needs. The scope of the foundation was intentionally left broad to give the flexibility to respond to a wide range of personal circumstances. Externally, the Enis Furley Foundation is active in community outreach programs, "Hot Corner Kids," and the construction of outdoor retreats, such as "Camp Emma Lou" (named after another one of Rolen's dogs). Rolen's goals for his charity efforts are simple: "To have fun, have a blast. Let's play."

Rolen gave Indiana University a "major gift" to the Indiana University baseball program and its facility, Bart Kaufman Field. Rolen made the contribution in honor of his parents, Ed and Linda Rolen, who are longtime educators and IU fans.

== Awards and honors ==
- 1993 Selected to the Indiana Basketball All Star Team
- 1993 Mr. Baseball (Indiana)
- 1997 NL Rookie of the Year
- 8-time National League 3B Gold Glove Award (1998, 2000–04, 2006, 2010)
- 7-time National League All-Star (2002–2006, 2010, 2011)
- National League Silver Slugger (2002)

Rolen was elected to the Baseball Hall of Fame by the Baseball Writers' Association of America in 2023, his sixth year of eligibility. Notably, he had received only 10.2% of the vote in his first appearance on the ballot in 2018, the lowest ever for a candidate eventually voted in by the BBWAA. He was formally inducted on July 23.

== Personal life ==
Rolen is married and is a father of two children. When he was inducted into the Hall of Fame, Rolen celebrated the announcement with his parents, wife, and children. In 2018, when he first appeared on the Hall of Fame ballot, Rolen's son predicted that his father would someday be inducted.

On July 18, 2018, Rolen was hired as the Director of Player Development for Indiana University baseball.

== See also ==
- Cincinnati Reds award winners and league leaders
- Philadelphia Phillies award winners and league leaders
- St. Louis Cardinals award winners and league leaders
- List of Major League Baseball career assists as a third baseman leaders
- List of Major League Baseball career doubles leaders
- List of Major League Baseball career games played as a third baseman leaders
- List of Major League Baseball career hit by pitch leaders
- List of Major League Baseball career hits leaders
- List of Major League Baseball career home run leaders
- List of Major League Baseball career putouts as a third baseman leaders
- List of Major League Baseball career strikeouts by batters leaders

Awards
Preceded by Jason Kendall	Sporting News NL Rookie of the Year; 1997	Succeeded by Todd Helton
Preceded by Todd Hollandsworth	Players Choice NL Most Outstanding Rookie; 1997	Succeeded by Kerry Wood
Preceded by Joe Randa	Topps Rookie All-Star Third Baseman; 1997	Succeeded by Bob Smith
