= Omar Vizquel =

Venezuelan baseball player and coach (born 1967)

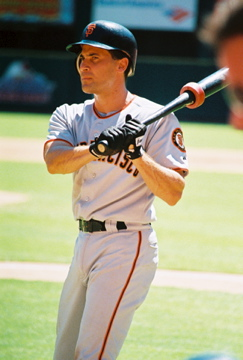
- Vizquel with the San Francisco Giants in 2005
- Shortstop
- Born: April 24, 1967 (age 59); Caracas, Venezuela
- Batted: Switch Threw: Right

MLB debut
- April 3, 1989, for the Seattle Mariners

Last MLB appearance
- October 3, 2012, for the Toronto Blue Jays

MLB statistics
- Batting average: .272
- Hits: 2,877
- Home runs: 80
- Runs batted in: 951
- Stolen bases: 404
- Stats at Baseball Reference

Teams
- As player: Seattle Mariners (1989–1993); Cleveland Indians (1994–2004); San Francisco Giants (2005–2008); Texas Rangers (2009); Chicago White Sox (2010–2011); Toronto Blue Jays (2012); As coach: Los Angeles Angels of Anaheim (2013); Detroit Tigers (2014–2017)

Career highlights and awards
- 3× All-Star (1998, 1999, 2002); 11× Gold Glove Award (1993–2001, 2005, 2006); Cleveland Guardians Hall of Fame

Omar Enrique Vizquel González (Spanish pronunciation: [oˈmaɾ βisˈkel]; born April 24, 1967), nicknamed "Little O", is a Venezuelan former professional baseball shortstop and coach. During his 24-year Major League Baseball (MLB) career, Vizquel played for the Seattle Mariners, Cleveland Indians, San Francisco Giants, Texas Rangers, Chicago White Sox, and Toronto Blue Jays. In Venezuela, he played for Leones del Caracas.

Widely considered one of baseball's all-time best fielding shortstops, Vizquel won 11 Gold Glove Awards, including nine consecutive from 1993 to 2001. Among shortstops, his .9847 fielding percentage is the highest all-time and he is the all-time leader in games played and double plays turned. Vizquel tied Cal Ripken Jr.'s American League record for most consecutive games at shortstop without an error (95, between September 26, 1999, and July 21, 2000), since surpassed. Vizquel had the most hits leader among players from Venezuela (2,877; 44th all-time) until May 12, 2021, when he was surpassed by Miguel Cabrera. Vizquel has third-most hits all time among shortstops, behind Derek Jeter and Honus Wagner. Vizquel is also the career sacrifice hits leader of the live-ball era.

At the time of his retirement, Vizquel was the oldest position player in the major leagues, and the only active position player with service time in the 1980s. He is one of only 31 players in baseball history to play in Major League games in four decades, and the only one who played shortstop. On May 7, 2012, Vizquel became the oldest player to play at shortstop in Major League history, surpassing Bobby Wallace, who played 12 games with the 1918 St. Louis Cardinals at the age of 44. Vizquel was the last active player in any of the major North American professional sports leagues to have played in the 1980s.

From 2014 to 2017, he was the Detroit Tigers' first-base, infield, and baserunning coach. He was also manager for the Toros de Tijuana of the Mexican League, and for the Venezuela national baseball team at the 2017 World Baseball Classic. Starting in 2020, various allegations of domestic abuse and sexual harassment emerged against him.

== Playing career ==
=== Seattle Mariners ===
Vizquel started his career with the Leones del Caracas of the Venezuelan Winter League together with Tony Armas, Bo Díaz, and Andrés Galarraga. He learned to switch hit from Bill Plummer, who managed Vizquel with the Leones del Caracas in 1986–87 and 1988–89 and later coached and managed the Mariners. Originally signed by the Mariners as a non-drafted free agent in 1984, Vizquel made his major league debut on April 3, 1989. Batting ninth in the lineup, he went 0-for-3 while making five assists, a double play, and an error in a 3–2 loss to the Oakland Athletics. Three nights later, he collected his first career hit in the third inning against Storm Davis with a single, later scoring on a Darnell Coles double, although the Mariners lost 11–3 to the Athletics.

Vizquel threw out Ernest Riles for the last out of Chris Bosio's no-hitter, the second no-hitter in franchise history, on April 22, 1993. That season he won his first Gold Glove Award.

=== Cleveland Indians ===
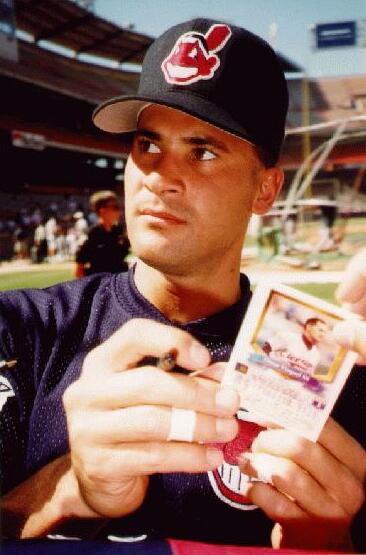
Vizquel with Cleveland in 1996

At the end of the 1993 season, the Mariners traded Vizquel to the Cleveland Indians for Félix Fermín, Reggie Jefferson, and cash. During Vizquel's career in Cleveland, the Indians made it to the World Series twice, losing to the Atlanta Braves in 1995 and to the Florida Marlins in 1997. Vizquel is a lifetime .250 hitter in 57 postseason games.

Vizquel won nine consecutive Gold Gloves with the Mariners and Indians, starting with his first in 1993 with Seattle and continuing until 2001. Alex Rodriguez broke Vizquel's streak and won the award in 2002. Vizquel won two additional Gold Gloves in 2005 and 2006 with the San Francisco Giants.

In 1999, Vizquel hit over .300 and scored 100 runs for the first time in his career, finishing the season with a .333 batting average and 112 runs scored for an Indians team that scored a league-leading 1,009 runs. Vizquel hit second in the lineup between lead-off man Kenny Lofton and third-place hitter Roberto Alomar in the most productive offensive lineup in Cleveland baseball history, which also included power hitters Jim Thome and Manny Ramirez.

On August 5, 2001, Vizquel hit a three-run triple in the ninth inning against Seattle to tie the game 14–14, capping a comeback from a 14–2 deficit. The Indians went on to win 15–14 in 11 innings, tying the record for the largest comeback win in major league history. Vizquel reached career highs in 2002 hitting 14 homers and 72 RBI, but his success was interrupted by the need for surgery on his right knee. He tied the 2002 All-Star Game 7–7 with an RBI triple in the eighth inning. As a result of his knee injury in 2002 and a follow-up operation, he appeared in only 64 games in 2003. In a game on May 27, 2003, Vizquel had a straight steal of home against the Detroit Tigers. He caught Tigers pitcher Steve Avery by surprise and made it home without a throw. Vizquel returned in 2004 to hit .291 in 148 games. At the end of the season, Vizquel was signed by the Giants as a free agent.

=== San Francisco Giants ===
On June 23, 2007, the Hispanic Heritage Baseball Museum Hall of Fame inducted Vizquel, along with former Giants outfielder Matty Alou, into its Hall of Fame during an on-field, pre-game ceremony. For the 13th and final time, Vizquel finished in the top ten in sacrifice hits, having 14 to finish 2nd along with John Maine behind Juan Pierre.

Vizquel underwent arthroscopic knee surgery on February 27, 2008. He started the 2008 season on the disabled list and played in his first game on May 10. Vizquel stole home for the second time in his career against Oakland Athletics pitcher Greg Smith on June 13.

Vizquel won the Hutch Award and the Willie Mac Award, and was a finalist for the Heart & Hustle Award. Only two other players, Dave Dravecky and Craig Biggio, have won more than one of these awards, although Willie McCovey himself won the Hutch Award before having the Willie Mac Award named for him.

Vizquel was Greg Maddux's 3,000th strikeout victim on July 26, 2005.

=== Texas Rangers ===
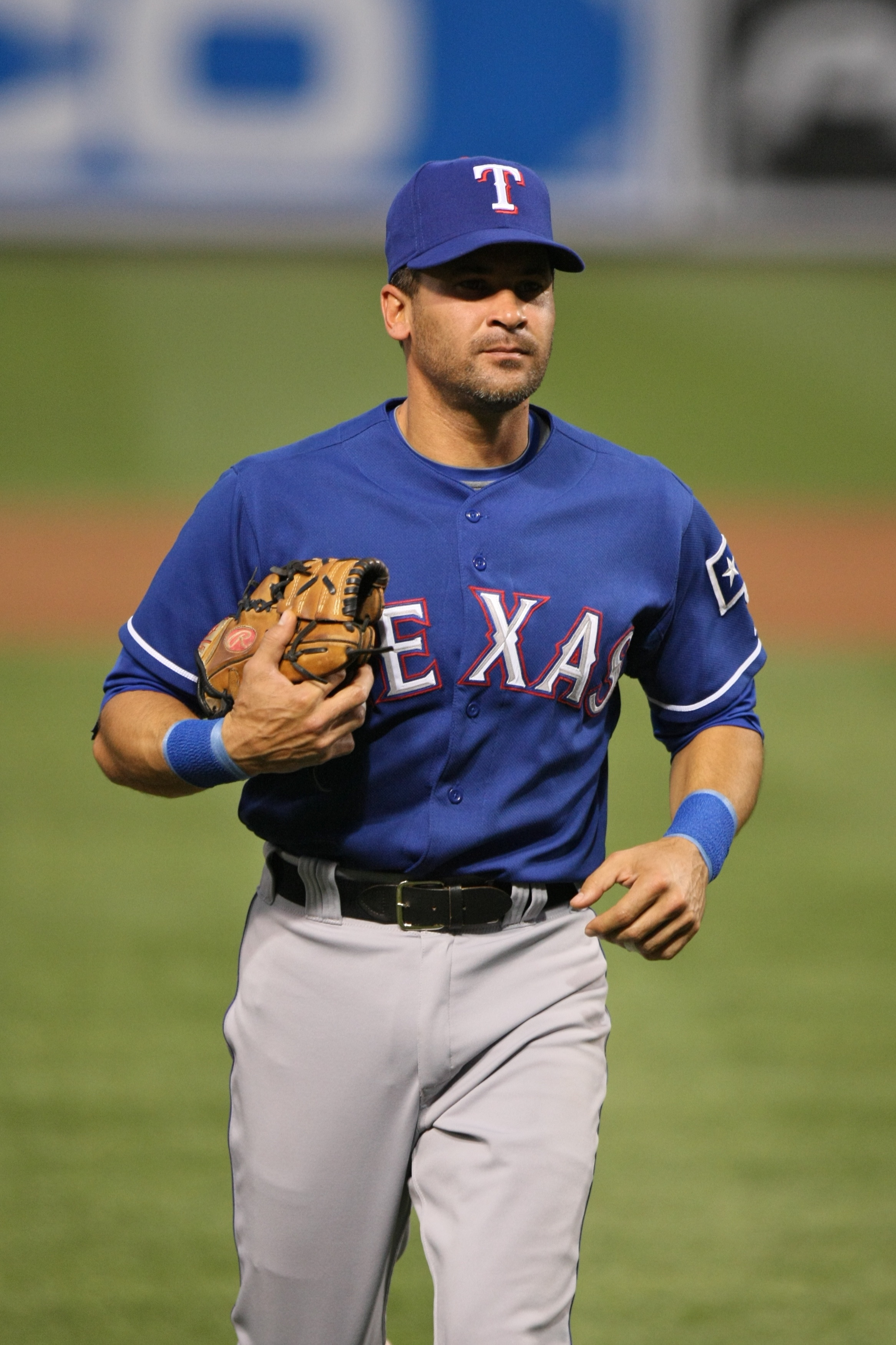
Vizquel with the Rangers in 2009

On January 21, 2009, Vizquel signed a minor league contract with the Texas Rangers and made the team's major league roster. He served mainly as a backup middle infielder. In 62 games with the Rangers, he had 47 hits, 17 runs, 14 RBIs with a .266 batting average and a .660 OPS to go with 27 strikeouts and 13 walks. In each of the three positions (shortstop, third base, second base) he played with the team, he made no errors. He played 27 games at shortstop for 196.2 innings, making 32 putouts and 76 assists with 22 double plays turned; he appeared in 20 games at third base for 101 innings, having five putouts and 22 assists, while making 23 putouts and 49 assists at second base.

=== Chicago White Sox ===
On November 23, 2009, Vizquel agreed to a one-year contract with the Chicago White Sox worth $1.4 million. After making the deal official, former shortstop and White Sox legend (and fellow Venezuelan) Luis Aparicio asked that his number 11 be temporarily "unretired" for Vizquel during the 2010 season, mostly due to the fact that White Sox manager Ozzie Guillén — like Vizquel and Aparicio, a Venezuelan shortstop — had rights to #13, the number Vizquel has worn through his career.

On May 25, 2010, Vizquel became the shortstop with the third most hits all time, behind Derek Jeter and Honus Wagner. On June 25, he hit his first home run of 2010, putting him on the short list of players who have hit home runs in four different decades (with Ted Williams, Willie McCovey, and Rickey Henderson). On November 2, 2010, Vizquel signed a one-year deal to remain in Chicago. On April 3, 2011, Vizquel hit a single for his 2,800th career hit. Despite being well into his forties, Vizquel was still regarded as one of the better defensive shortstops in the game and seen by his former White Sox teammates as one of the most physically fit.

=== Toronto Blue Jays ===
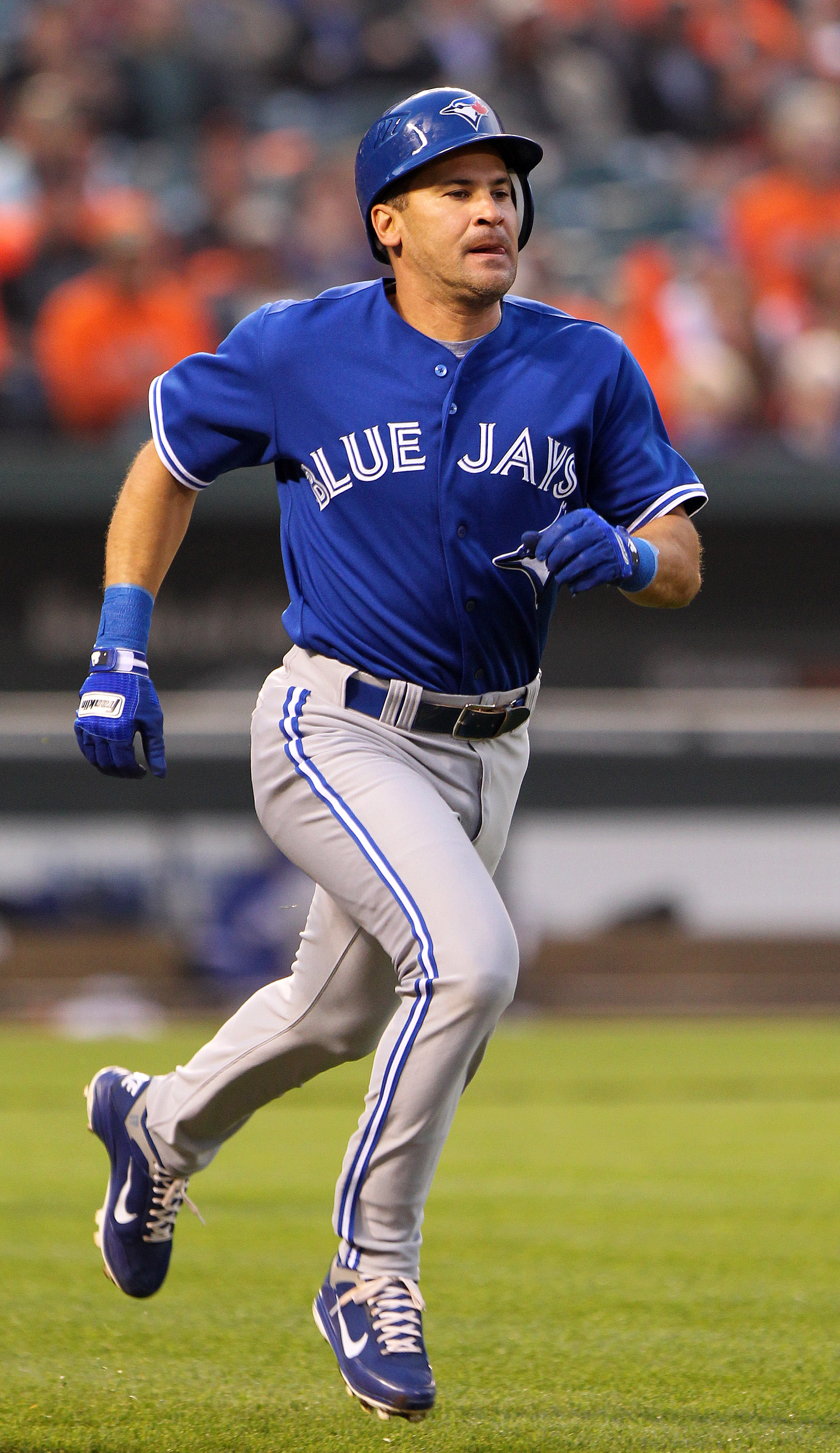
Vizquel with the Blue Jays in 2012

Vizquel signed a one-year minor league contract with the Toronto Blue Jays for the 2012 season. He made the team out of spring training, and made his first appearance on Opening Day, against his former club, the Cleveland Indians. His first start came on April 22, against the Kansas City Royals. Vizquel was ejected from a game against the Texas Rangers on May 1, arguing with the home plate umpire from the bench. Later in May, Vizquel hinted at retirement upon the conclusion of the 2012 season. Despite being 45 years old and appearing in only five games at that point in the season, he stated, "I feel excited about coming to the ballpark. Maybe not every day, because there are going to be some days you're going to be sore. But I still feel I want to be here. I want to compete."

Against the Detroit Tigers on July 27, Vizquel hit his first two extra-base hits of the season, a double and triple. Vizquel became the third oldest player to hit a triple (behind Julio Franco and Nick Altrock) and became the oldest player in major league history to hit a double and a triple in the same game.

In the first game of a day-night doubleheader against the New York Yankees on September 19, Vizquel recorded his 2,874th career hit, passing Babe Ruth for 41st all-time.

In the final game of the 2012 season, Brett Lawrie wore a #17 jersey as opposed to his usual #13. This allowed Vizquel to wear #13, the number he wore through most of his career, when he played his final game on October 3. Vizquel batted 1-for-3, hitting a single in his last at-bat, the 2,877th hit of his career, moving him ahead of Mel Ott for 40th position on the all-time hits list. Vizquel retired after the season and was the last position player born in the 1960s, as well as the last to play in the 1980s, to retire.

== Coaching career ==
=== Los Angeles Angels of Anaheim ===
On January 30, 2013, the Los Angeles Angels of Anaheim hired Vizquel to become a co-infield coach with Bobby Knoop, replacing Dick Schofield.

=== Detroit Tigers ===
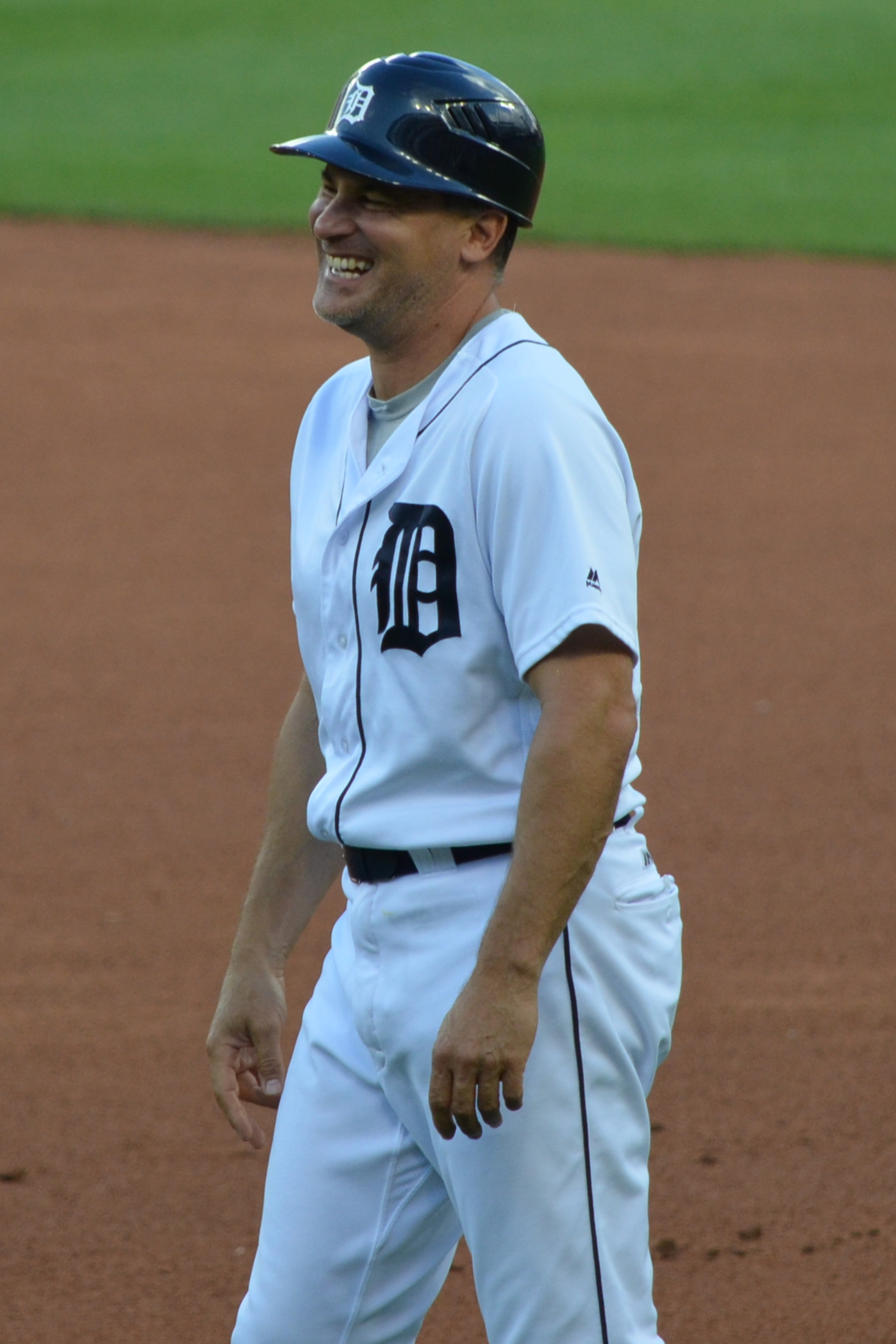
Vizquel as first-base coach of the Detroit Tigers in 2017

On November 18, 2013, the Detroit Tigers named Vizquel as their new first-base coach, replacing Rafael Belliard. Under manager Brad Ausmus, Vizquel also served as the Tigers infield and baserunning instructor. Following the dismissal of Ausmus after the 2017 season, Vizquel interviewed for the vacant manager's position but was passed over in favor of Ron Gardenhire.

=== Chicago White Sox ===
In November 2017, Vizquel returned to the White Sox organization to manage their Class A-Advanced team, the Winston-Salem Dash. In December 2018, Vizquel was promoted to manage the White Sox' Double-A team, the Birmingham Barons. In 2019, Vizquel was let go by the Barons after an incident between him and a male employee which resulted in an MLB investigation. The incident was first made public in 2021, and initial reports in 2019 said Vizquel and the White Sox parted amicably.

=== Toros de Tijuana ===
On December 2, 2019, Vizquel was named the manager for the Toros de Tijuana of the Mexican League. In July 2021, Vizquel left the team.

== Personal life ==
Vizquel has been active in community service, having served as an honorary spokesperson for "Young Audiences", an arts education organization in Cleveland, and "Schools Now", which raises funds through the sale of entertainment booklets. Following the 1999 Vargas mudslide disaster that killed 25,000 in his native Venezuela, Vizquel volunteered for the relief effort and helped raise over $500,000 for the cause. Vizquel has held various charitable events in downtown Cleveland such as Tribe Jam, where he and some other teammates get together with each other or with retired singers and sing some of their favorite songs.

His 2002 autobiography, Omar!: My Life on and Off the Field, co-written with Bob Dyer, spent four weeks on the New York Times Best Seller List. It was released in paperback in 2003.

Vizquel married Nicole Tonkin, a Seattle native, in 1992. They have two children, born in 1995 and 2007. They later divorced. Vizquel married Venezuelan Blanca García in July 2014, from whom he divorced on December 22, 2021. In August 2023, after two years of dating, he became engaged to Mónica Gemza, and on March 15, 2025, they married at El Consejo.

=== Feud with José Mesa ===
A long-running and well-publicized feud erupted between Vizquel and former teammate and friend José Mesa. In 2002, following the publication of his autobiography, Vizquel criticized Mesa's performance in Game 7 of the 1997 World Series:

"The eyes of the world were focused on every move we made. Unfortunately, Jose's own eyes were vacant. Completely empty. Nobody home. You could almost see right through him. Not long after I looked into his vacant eyes, he blew the save and the Marlins tied the game."

Mesa reacted furiously, pledging to hit Vizquel upon every subsequent opportunity:

"Even my little boy told me to get him. If I face him 10 more times, I'll hit him 10 times. I want to kill him."

On June 12, 2002, Mesa hit Vizquel with a pitch in the ninth inning. Mesa was not ejected and finished the game. They did not face each other again until 2006; by then, Vizquel was with the San Francisco Giants and Mesa was playing for the Colorado Rockies. When Vizquel came to bat against Mesa in Denver on April 22, Mesa hit him again. Meeting three more times in 2006, however, Vizquel escaped being hit by his former teammate, with two groundouts and an RBI single. Vizquel batted .333 (7-for-21) against Mesa before Mesa retired in 2007.

=== Domestic abuse allegations ===
On December 16, 2020, The Athletic reported that Vizquel's wife Blanca (who was filing for divorce) alleged that he physically abused her in 2011 (which was before their marriage) and in 2016. Blanca previously made the allegation in an Instagram live video on October 7, 2020. According to The Athletic, in 2016, Vizquel was charged with fourth-degree domestic assault after an incident at their home in Sammamish, Washington. Blanca told police that her husband pushed her during an argument, causing her to fall and suffer an injury to her shin and multiple broken fingernails. Charges were later dropped at her request. She said in the article that Vizquel coerced her into signing the letter and threatened her with financial retribution. The Athletic also described an incident in December 2011, when Vizquel allegedly strangled his wife during an argument at her sister's home in Alabama. He denied the allegation and claimed that Blanca scratched him, which she denied. The couple ultimately filed a successful joint motion to dismiss charges.

In a statement, Vizquel strongly denied the allegations against him. MLB investigated the situation.

=== Sexual harassment lawsuit ===
The Athletic reported on August 7, 2021, that Vizquel and the White Sox were being sued in the United States District Court for the Northern District of Alabama by Ashtain O'Neal (a Birmingham Barons batboy) who alleged that Vizquel sexually harassed him, targeting him because of his autism. Vizquel and the plaintiff reached a confidential settlement in June 2022. In 2023, Vizquel said he regretted some of the words he said to the boy but could not discuss details of the incident due to the settlement. He said he was not suspended by MLB but had not been invited to several events from his former teams.

== Records and accomplishments ==
=== Fielding ===
- All-time leader in double plays made while playing shortstop
- 11-time Gold Glove recipient
- Oldest shortstop recipient of the Gold Glove (age 38 in 2005, and again at age 39 in 2006)
- Highest career fielding percentage by a shortstop (0.9846) with at least 1,000 games played
- Lowest number of errors in a season by a shortstop (tie) (3 in the 2000 season)
- Sixth in assists all-time, third in assists at SS all-time

=== Offense ===
- At retirement was the all-time leader in hits by a player from Venezuela
- The 47th major league player to reach 2,800 career hits (April 3, 2011)
- At retirement was the second-most hits by an active (roster) player behind Derek Jeter, was the category leader for the 2008 and a portion of the 2009 seasons, 47th all-time
- At retirement had the most singles by an active (roster) player, 20th all-time
- At retirement had the most at-bats by an active (roster) player, 19th all-time
- Fifth all-time in sacrifice hits plus sacrifice flies behind Eddie Collins, Jake Daubert, Stuffy McInnis and Willie Keeler
- All-time leader in sacrifice hits in the live-ball era, and four-time league leader (1997, 1999, 2004 & 2005)
- Likely fifth to seventh all-time in sacrifice hits after accounting for the 1954 statistical change (40th all-time without adjustment)
- At retirement, had the second-most sacrifice flies by an active (roster) player behind Alex Rodriguez, 50th all-time (tie)
- At retirement had the third most stolen bases by an active (roster) player behind Juan Pierre and Carl Crawford, 68th all-time
- American League record holder (tie) for most hits in a nine-inning game: Vizquel hit six on August 31, 2004
- Second-most hits while playing shortstop (behind Derek Jeter)
- Fourth-most runs while playing shortstop all-time (behind Herman Long, Derek Jeter and Bill Dahlen)
- Seventh-most stolen bases while playing shortstop all-time (behind Bert Campaneris, Ozzie Smith, Herman Long, Luis Aparicio, Honus Wagner, and Bill Dahlen)
- At retirement had most seasons by active player as a batting title qualifier with isolated power (extra bases per at-bat) under .100, with 12
- 44th all-time in career hits (2,877)

=== Overall ===
- First all time in games played at shortstop
- At retirement had played the most games by an active (roster) player, 14th all-time
- Three-time All-Star (1998, 1999 & 2002)
- Won two American League Championships (with Cleveland, 1995, 1997)
- Won six American League Central Division Championships (with Cleveland, 1995–99, 2001)
- Won the Hutch Award (1996), the only non-American player ever to do so
- Won the Willie Mac Award (2006) for spirit and leadership
- Finalist for the Heart & Hustle Award (2007) for embodying "the values, spirit and tradition of the game"
- Captain of Venezuelan World Baseball Classic team (2006)
- Member of the Hispanic Heritage Baseball Museum Hall of Fame
- Inducted into the Cleveland Guardians Hall of Fame (2014)
- Selected as one of the four greatest Indians in franchise history for the 2015 All Star Game's "Franchise 4"(2015)

Vizquel has appeared on balloting for the National Baseball Hall of Fame since 2018, when he received 37.0% of the vote, well short of the 75% required for election, but well above the 5% minimum required to remain on the ballot. His support increased to 52.6% in 2020 before going down to 49.1% in the 2021 ballot and then cratering to 23.9% in the 2022 ballot, his fifth year on the ballot before going down to 19.5% on his 6th year of eligibility in 2023. In 2024, his 7th year, he received 17.7% of votes, decreasing by 1.8% from his previous year. A player may appear on the regular ballot, voted on by members of the BBWA, a maximum of ten times, although there are opportunities to get elected to the Hall by other means, as MLB has committees staffed by former ballplayers who can elect someone previously overlooked.

== See also ==
- Cleveland Indians award winners and league leaders
- List of Gold Glove middle infield duos
- List of Major League Baseball career assists leaders
- List of Major League Baseball career doubles leaders
- List of Major League Baseball career games played leaders
- List of Major League Baseball career hits leaders
- List of Major League Baseball career runs scored leaders
- List of Major League Baseball career singles leaders
- List of Major League Baseball career stolen bases leaders
- List of Major League Baseball players from Venezuela
- List of Major League Baseball players who played in four decades
- List of Major League Baseball single-game hits leaders
- Seattle Mariners award winners and league leaders
