= Chipper Jones =

American baseball player (born 1972)

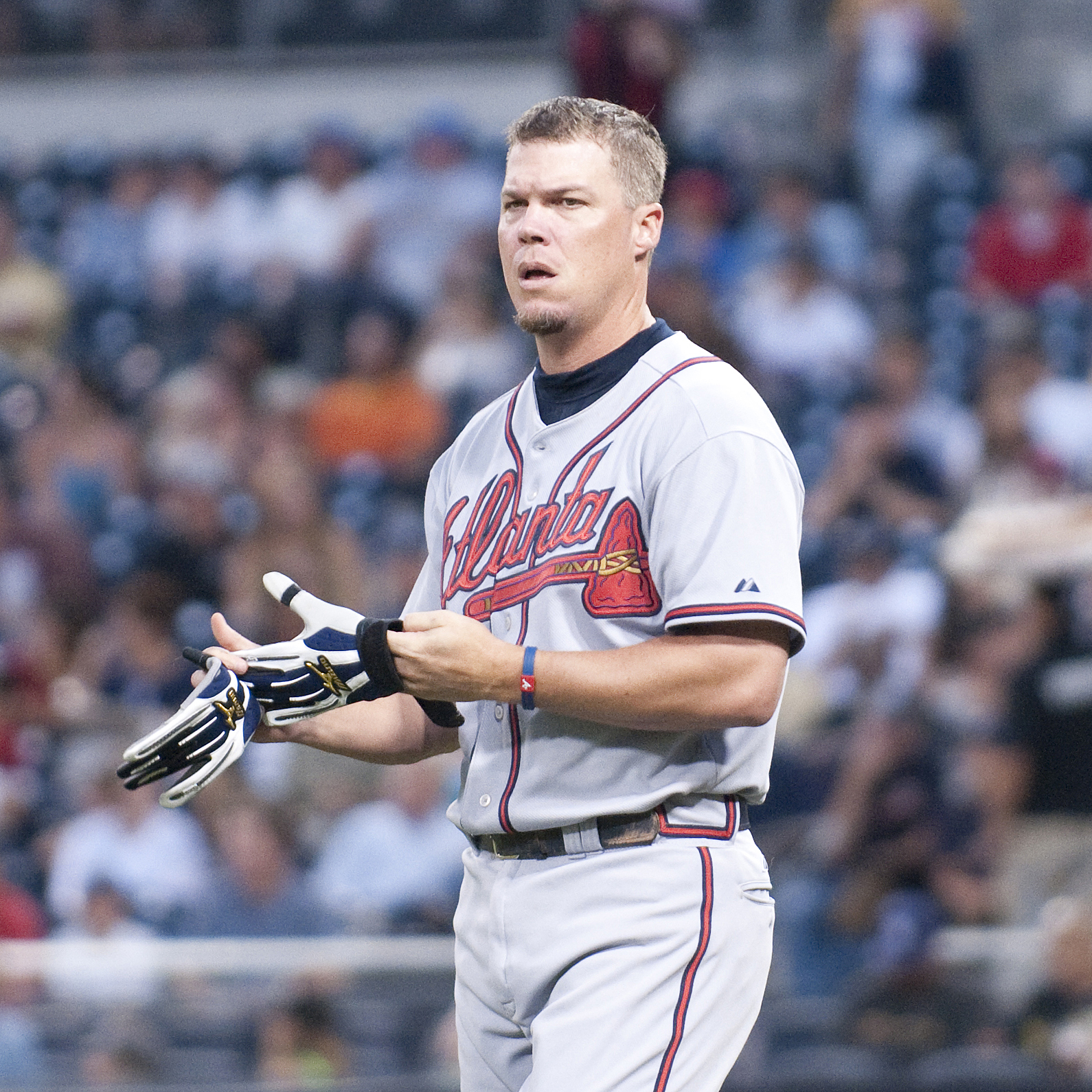
- Jones with the Atlanta Braves in 2009

Atlanta Braves – No. 10
- Third baseman
- Born: April 24, 1972 (age 54); DeLand, Florida, U.S.
- Batted: Switch Threw: Right

MLB debut
- September 11, 1993, for the Atlanta Braves

Last MLB appearance
- October 3, 2012, for the Atlanta Braves

MLB statistics
- Batting average: .303
- Hits: 2,726
- Home runs: 468
- Runs batted in: 1,623
- Stats at Baseball Reference

Teams
- As player: Atlanta Braves (1993, 1995–2012); As coach: Atlanta Braves (2021–present)

Career highlights and awards
- 8× All-Star (1996–1998, 2000, 2001, 2008, 2011, 2012); World Series champion (1995); NL MVP (1999); 2× Silver Slugger Award (1999, 2000); MLB batting champion (2008); Atlanta Braves No. 10 retired; Braves Hall of Fame

Member of the National

Baseball Hall of Fame
- Induction: 2018
- Vote: 97.2% (first ballot)

Larry Wayne "Chipper" Jones Jr. (born April 24, 1972) is an American former professional baseball third baseman who played in Major League Baseball (MLB) for the Atlanta Braves from 1993 to 2012. The Braves chose Jones with the first overall pick in the 1990 MLB draft. He was also a member of their 1995 World Series championship team that beat the Cleveland Indians. An eight-time All-Star, Jones won the 1999 National League (NL) Most Valuable Player Award and the 1999 and 2000 NL Silver Slugger Award for third basemen. He was the MLB batting champion in 2008 after hitting .364.

Jones ended his career in 2012 with a .303 career batting average, 468 home runs, and 1,623 runs batted in (RBIs) and holds the Braves team record for career on-base percentage (.402); Jones ranks third on the Braves career home run list. Jones is the only switch hitter in MLB history with a career batting average above .300 and more than 300 home runs. He ranks second behind Eddie Murray for career RBIs for switch hitters and is third behind Mickey Mantle and Lance Berkman in slugging percentage. He was the 18th player in MLB history to accumulate 5,000 at bats and finish with at least a .300 batting average, .400 on-base percentage, and .500 slugging percentage—and the only switch hitter to reach all of these milestones.

On June 28, 2013, the Braves retired Jones' number 10 and inducted him into the team's Hall of Fame. In 2018, he was inducted into the Baseball Hall of Fame in his first year of eligibility. Jones served as an ESPN color analyst in 2020. He returned to the Braves as an assistant hitting consultant in 2021.

== Early life ==
Chipper Jones was born Larry Wayne Jones Jr. in DeLand, Florida, on April 24, 1972, and grew up in Pierson, Florida. His father, Larry Wayne Jones Sr., was a teacher and coach at T. DeWitt Taylor High School in Pierson. Chipper Jones later attended the same high school and played baseball there. His mother is Lynne Jones. Jones received the nickname "Chipper" from his father and other family members, who saw the younger Larry as a "chip off the old block." He showed an early love for baseball predominantly because of his father's position as coach, and began to play on Little League teams at age seven.

=== High school ===
Jones began his high school baseball career at Taylor High School, where he pitched a one-hitter as a freshman. He went to The Bolles School as a sophomore, where he was a two-way player in football. In baseball, he had a 6–3 win–loss record with 87 strikeouts and a 1.89 earned run average (ERA) as a pitcher, with a .391 batting average and seven home runs, earning him First Team All-State honors. In 1989, Jones won First Team All-State honors in both football and baseball, and won a state championship in baseball. He was also selected as the tournament's most valuable player, and had an 11–1 pitching record, 0.81 ERA, and 107 strikeouts in 84 innings pitched. In his senior year, the Bulldogs were the state-runner up while Jones compiled a 7–3 record with a 1.00 ERA and 100 strikeouts in 79 innings on the mound, while hitting .488 with 14 stolen bases.

Jones won the Gatorade Florida Baseball Player of the Year, Regional Baseball Player of the Year, and the runner-up National Player of the Year. He was inducted into the Florida High School Athletic Association Hall of Fame in 2012. Jones accepted a scholarship offer to play college baseball at the University of Miami.

== Professional career ==
=== Draft ===
The Atlanta Braves selected Jones as the first pick overall in the 1990 Major League Baseball draft and signed him to a contract with a $275,000 signing bonus. Atlanta expressed a desire to select pitcher Todd Van Poppel as the first pick, but Van Poppel explicitly stated that he would not sign with the Braves. Atlanta then selected Jones, who played shortstop at the time.

=== Minor leagues (1991–1993) ===
In 1991, Jones played with the Macon Braves, Atlanta's class-A minor league affiliate. His average was .326, with 24 doubles, 11 triples, 15 home runs, 40 steals, 69 walks, and 79 strikeouts in 473 at bats; however, he made 56 errors at the shortstop position. Jones moved up to the Durham Bulls, the Braves' class A-advanced minor league team, in 1992. Jones's average was .277 after 70 games; he was then moved to double-A Greenville Braves where he cut his error total from 56 in the previous season to 32.

Following a successful season, Jones played with the Triple-A Richmond Braves, where he played 139 games before being called to Atlanta for his major league debut. During his time in the Braves' minor league system, Jones was involved in a bench-clearing brawl with future Major League stars Manny Ramirez and Jim Thome. Thome and Jones would eventually go on to develop a good friendship over the years. He also changed his position from shortstop to third base, following the guidance of the Braves organization.

=== Major league career (1993–2012) ===
==== 1993–1998 ====
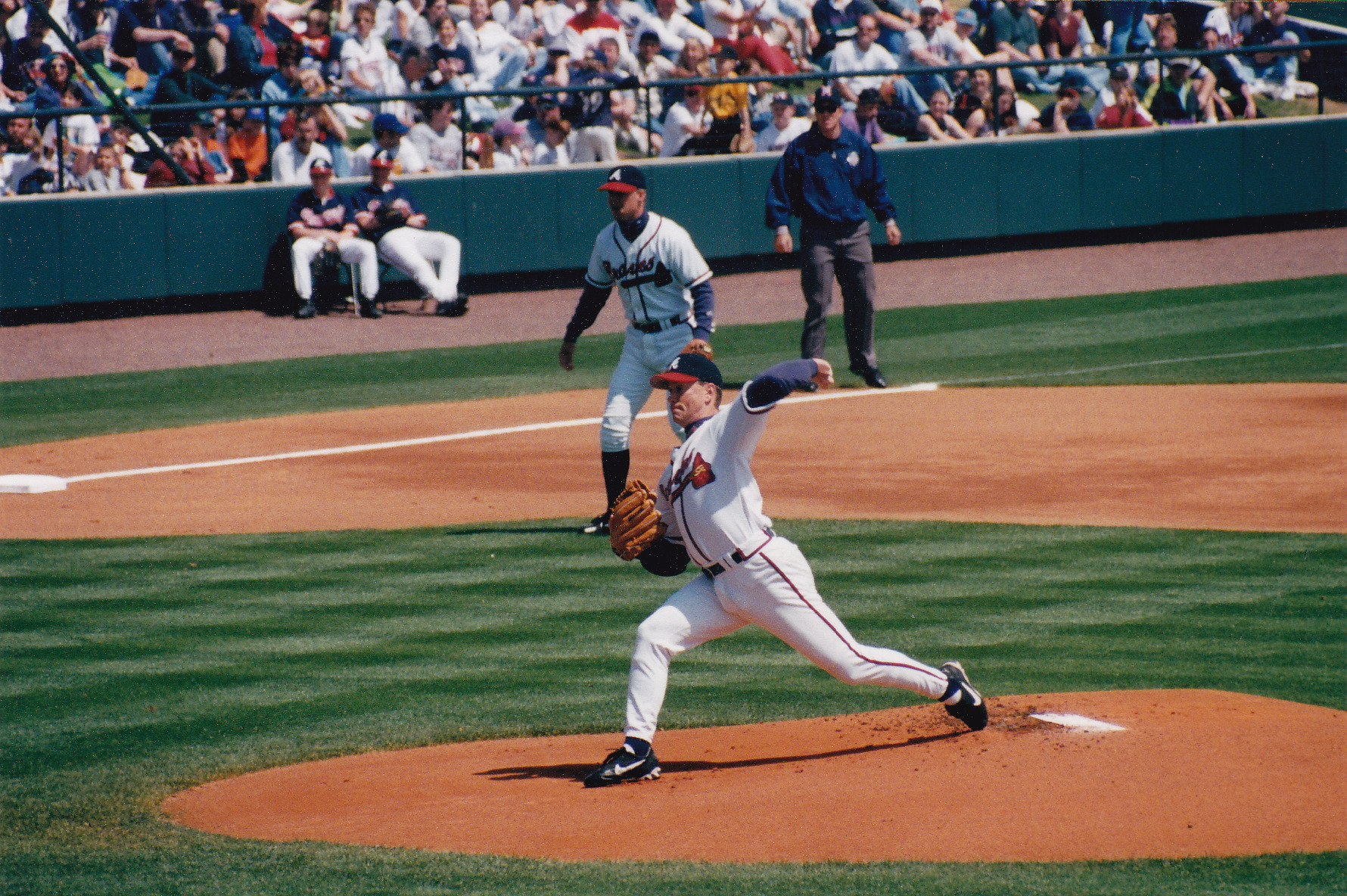
Jones playing third base while Tom Glavine is pitching versus the Detroit Tigers during a 1998 spring training game

Jones made his major league debut on September 11, 1993, as the youngest player in the league. In 1994, he was expected to compete for the starting left field job after veteran Ron Gant broke his leg during an offseason dirt bike accident. However, Jones suffered an anterior cruciate ligament tear in his left knee in spring training. As a result, he spent the entire strike shortened 1994 season on the disabled list.

In 1995, Jones led all major league rookies in runs batted in (RBIs; 86), games played (145), games started (123), plate appearances (602), at bats (524), and runs scored (87). That year, he finished second in the National League Rookie of the Year Award balloting behind Los Angeles Dodgers pitcher Hideo Nomo. In addition to achieving a level of personal success, Jones played in the 1995 World Series, in which the Braves won in six games over the Cleveland Indians. He also played in the 1996 World Series, in which the Braves lost to the New York Yankees in six games.

Jones recorded the last official hit at Atlanta–Fulton County Stadium before its closure and demolition in 1997, as well as the first hit in Turner Field history. In 1998, Jones came in ninth in the voting for the National League Most Valuable Player Award, as he scored 123 runs and had 96 walks, both fourth best in the league).

==== 1999: MVP season ====
In 1999, Jones won the National League MVP award after becoming the first player ever to hit over .300 (.319) while slugging 40 or more home runs (45; 3rd in the NL) and doubles (41), drawing 100 or more walks (126; 3rd in the league), notching 100 or more RBI (110) and runs scored (116), and stealing 20 or more bases (25). Ironically, Jones was not selected for the MLB All-Star game that year. He was also walked intentionally 18 times; 2nd in the league, and his .633 slugging percentage was 4th best in the NL. A major factor in his selection as MVP was his performance against the Braves' chief competitors, the New York Mets. The Braves led the National League East by only one game as they entered a three-game September series against the Mets, the team that was right on their heels. Atlanta swept the series at Turner Field, though, largely thanks to Jones, who hit four home runs and drove in seven of the 13 runs that the Braves scored. For the season, he hit .319 with a .510 on-base percentage, a 1.000 slugging percentage, and seven home runs against the Mets. On September 30, 1999, after a game against the Mets, Jones drew the ire of Mets fans by saying, "Now, all the Mets fans can go home and put their Yankees' stuff on,” believing his team has eliminated the Mets from playoff contention. Looking back at that moment, Jones has stated “it all went downhill after that,” referring to the Mets making the postseason despite the odds and having to face them in the 1999 NLCS. In the playoffs, Jones led the Braves to the World Series against the New York Yankees, in which the Braves were swept.

==== 2000–2005 ====
Jones signed a six-year, $90 million contract with the Braves in 2000. Jones batted .330 in 2001, 5th best in the league, and led the league with a .349 road batting average. On his 29th birthday, he hit two home runs. On defense, however, his range factor of 2.14 placed him last among qualified major league third basemen.

In 2001, a season of flux for the Braves who had won the NL East every year since their 1995 World Series victory, Jones was involved in a public "lingering feud" with former teammate John Rocker. Rocker referred to Jones on the radio by saying "Chip's white trash" and "as two-faced as they came". By late June, the two claimed they had made peace.

Before the start of the 2002 season, Jones announced his willingness to move from third base to left field, to make room for the incoming Vinny Castilla. Jones proved adequate in left field, but following two more early playoff exits in 2002 and 2003, a hamstring pull in the early 2004 season and the struggles of third baseman Mark DeRosa, he moved back to his regular position of third base.

In 2002, he batted .327, again 5th best in the NL. Jones was third in the league with a .435 on-base percentage. On August 16, 2004, he hit the 300th home run of his career in a 5–4 victory over the San Diego Padres. Following the 2005 season, Jones reworked his contract with the Braves—freeing up money for the Braves to pursue elite free agents, while virtually ensuring he would end his career in Atlanta. The revamped deal gave the Braves $15 million over the course of the next three years, as well as $6 million to use in 2006. The new deal also converted two final team option years to guaranteed contracts.

==== 2006–2007 ====
Jones was selected to play in the inaugural 2006 World Baseball Classic (along with Braves teammates Jeff Francoeur and Brian McCann). He hit a home run in his first at bat of the Classic against Mexico off of Atlanta Braves teammate Óscar Villarreal, who was with the team from 2006 to 2007. Jones went 6-for-17 with a double and two home runs in the tournament.

The 2006 season was one of numerous milestones for Jones. On June 10, he became the Atlanta Braves' all-time RBI leader when he drove in his 1,144th run against the Houston Astros at Minute Maid Park, passing former outfielder Dale Murphy and placing Jones third on the franchise's all-time list (including Braves teams based in Boston and Milwaukee), behind Hank Aaron (2,202) and Eddie Mathews (1,388).

On July 15, 2006, Jones recorded his 1,902nd career hit, to become the Atlanta Braves' all-time hits leader, passing Dale Murphy. The next day he hit a home run to extend his extra-base hitting streak to 14 games, matching the Major League record set by Pittsburgh's Paul Waner in 1927. A month later, on August 14, Jones had his first career three-home-run game. Jones homered in his final three at bats in the Braves' 10–4 win over the Washington Nationals, finishing the night 4-for-5 with five RBIs. Despite successes at the plate, injuries dogged Jones throughout the season and for the first time in his career, the Braves failed to qualify for postseason play.

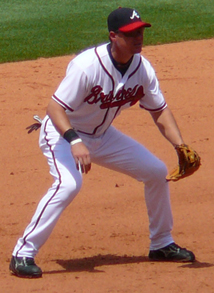
Jones playing third base in 2007

Jones performed well both offensively and defensively during the 2007 season. On June 16, he hit a single in the second inning against the Cleveland Indians for his 2,000th career hit. On July 5, Jones tied and passed Braves legend Dale Murphy for first on the all-time Atlanta Braves home run list when he hit his 371st and 372nd home runs against the Los Angeles Dodgers at Dodger Stadium. This game was also the first time he hit homers from both sides of the plate since 2000. The next day, he had his 400th career double in the ninth inning against San Diego Padres pitcher Kevin Cameron, who had previously only allowed one extra-base hit all year. On July 29, Jones matched a career-high with 5 RBIs as the Braves shut out the Arizona Diamondbacks 14–0. He accomplished the feat again on August 23 against the Cincinnati Reds. In the fifth inning of an August 9 game at Shea Stadium, Jones hit a towering three-run homer to right field off Mets starter John Maine. It would later be measured at 470 feet (140 m).

Jones finished the season first in the NL in times reached base on an error (14) and in OPS (1.029), second in batting average (.337), and third in OBP (.425) and SLG (.604). He was also sixth in MVP voting, his highest finish since winning the award in 1999.

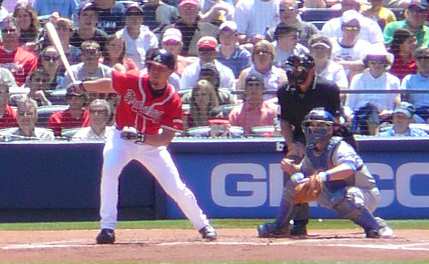
Jones with the Braves in 2008

While the Braves enjoyed some early successes, injuries to the pitching staff spoiled the ample contributions from Atlanta's potent offense. While the Braves posted a winning record, they finished third in the National League East, and sat out the postseason.

He opened the Chipper Jones's 10th Inning Baseball Academy in Suwanee, Georgia, in late 2007.

==== 2008–2011 ====
Jones began the 2008 season where he left off in 2007, hitting over .400 in April while slugging 7 home runs, including the first ever homer at Nationals Park during the inaugural game at the stadium on Opening Day. He also had back-to-back games in which he hit two home runs. Despite these accomplishments, he ultimately lost the NL Player of the Month award in April to Chase Utley. On June 13, Jones was hitting .414 with 15 home runs, but his average dropped to .393 by June 22.

He hit his 400th career home run on June 5 off Ricky Nolasco of the Florida Marlins, and he was named NL Player of the Week for the week of June 2–8. He was picked to start in the 2008 Major League Baseball All-Star Game, receiving the most votes by fans, managers, and other players of any NL third basemen. Jones won his first batting title at age 36, the oldest switch-hitter to win a batting title. Jones hit .364 during 2008, one point off the all-time switch-hitter high for a season of .365, set by Mickey Mantle in 1957.

In 2008, Jones tied an MLB record for most consecutive 20+ home run seasons to start a career (14).

In December 2008, Jones accepted an invitation to play for the USA team in the 2009 World Baseball Classic (WBC). He played alongside teammate Brian McCann. Jones was scratched from an elimination game in the tournament after straining his right oblique muscle in a WBC game. The announcement came an hour before the game was to be played against team Netherlands. As reported by CBC News on March 13, 2009, Jones criticized Toronto and the play schedule of the WBC.

On March 31, 2009, Jones agreed to a three-year, $42 million contract extension with the Braves; the deal includes an option that could become worth up to $61 million over four seasons. On May 28, against the Giants and Cy Young winner Tim Lincecum, Jones struck out four times in one game for the first time in his career.

In 2009, he was ranked number 10 on the Sporting News list of the 50 greatest current players in baseball. A panel of 100 baseball people, many of them members of the Baseball Hall of Fame and winners of major baseball awards, were polled to compile the list.

In 2009, Jones led all major league third basemen in errors, with 22, and had the lowest fielding percentage of any starting major league third baseman (.930).

Jones got off to a poor start in 2010 and met with Braves management in June to discuss possible retirement at the end of the season, but his performance improved as the season progressed. Jones's season came to an end after he was injured in a game against the Houston Astros on August 10; injury reports indicated that he had torn the ACL in his left knee, which would require surgery. In an August 13 press conference, he stated that he would not retire, and that "I don't want the fans' final image of me to be one of me hurt on the field".

During the off-season, Atlanta general manager Frank Wren said that Jones would likely be ready for Opening Day, telling The Atlanta Journal-Constitution that "I think he's progressed very well. He had a setback earlier in the winter when he was away for a week—I think he was actually on a hunting trip—and he was not doing the [leg] lifts. But as soon as he got back on his weights, he was fine. Right now, talking to the trainers, he should not have any restrictions coming into spring training."

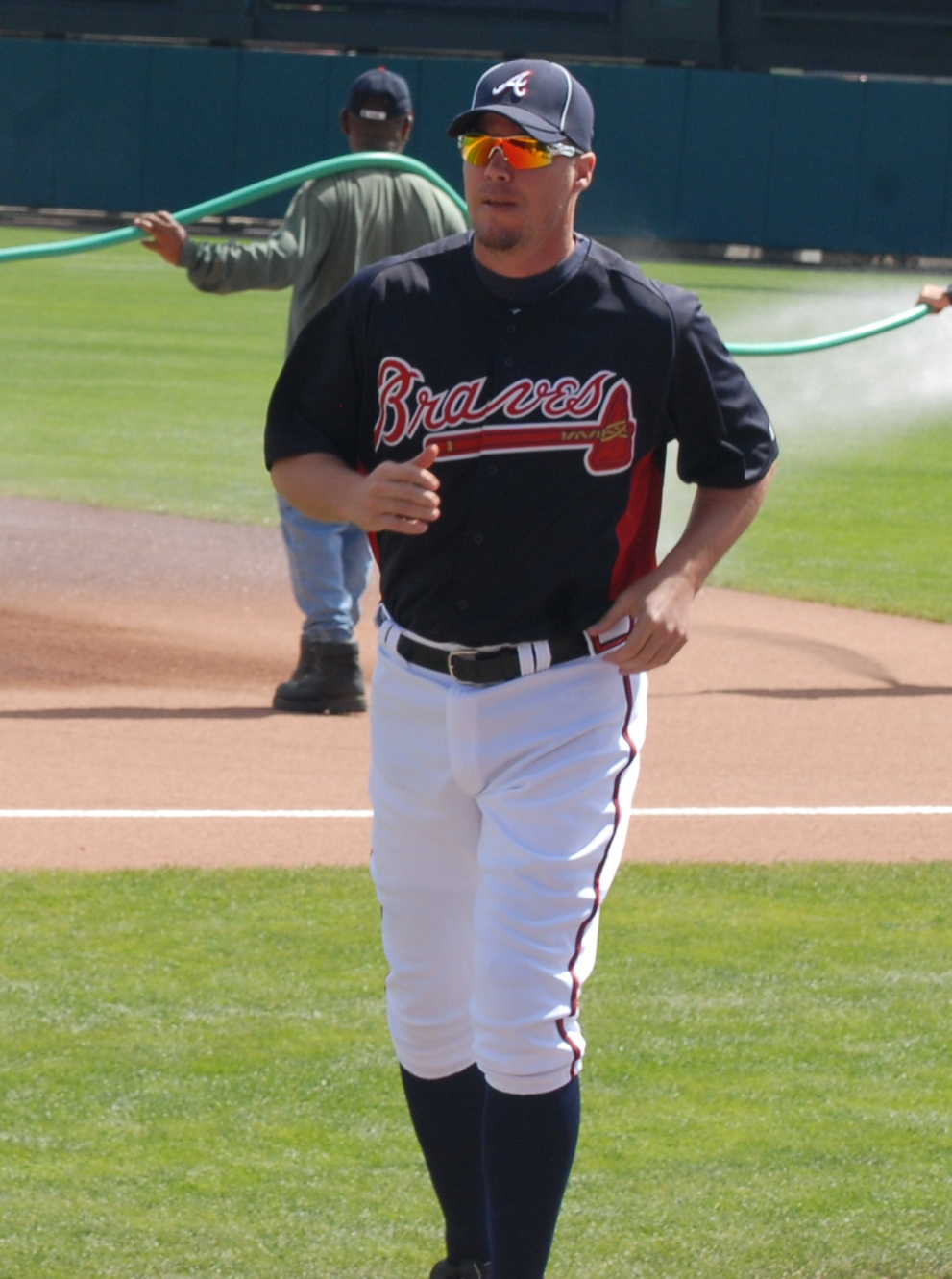
Jones before a spring training game in 2011

Jones completed his rehab and took part in spring training. He was in the Braves' opening day lineup against the Nationals, getting the first hit and scoring the first run of the 2011 MLB season. On April 8, Jones hit his 2,500th base hit in the Braves' home opener versus the Philadelphia Phillies. His former manager Bobby Cox was in attendance. On April 13, he recorded his 1,500th RBI, with a solo home run off Randy Choate of the Florida Marlins. On April 26, Jones recorded his 500th double against the San Diego Padres. He also tied Mickey Mantle for second-most RBIs all-time by a switch hitter; Jones passed Mantle for sole possession of second place all-time the next day after a three-RBI stand-up triple, helping the Braves beat the San Diego Padres 7–0.

Jones suffered from a torn meniscus in his right knee for much of the first half of the 2011 season and received Cortisone shots in an attempt to manage the pain. When this became ineffective, he elected to undergo arthroscopic surgery and was placed on the disabled list on July 9. He returned to the lineup on July 25.

On August 12, Jones hit a three-run homer against the Chicago Cubs for his 1,000th extra base hit. On August 19, Jones confirmed that he would return for the 2012 season, the final year on his contract, thus ending ongoing speculation about his possible retirement. On August 31, Jones hit his 450th career home run off John Lannan of the Washington Nationals.

==== 2012: Final season ====
On March 22, 2012, the Braves announced that Jones would retire following the 2012 season, after 19 major league seasons with the team. Following the announcement, a fan tribute song called "The Chipper Jones Song" was featured in a number of sports blogs.

Jones opened the 2012 season on the disabled list, following surgery on March 26, to repair a torn meniscus in his left knee. He was activated from the disabled list and was in the lineup on April 10, as the Braves faced the Houston Astros; he went 2-for-4 with a single and a two-run home run, helping the Braves to their first win of the season.

On April 24, Jones was in the lineup against the Los Angeles Dodgers on his 40th birthday. He hit a solo home run in Atlanta's 4–3 win, ending up with a career record of .429 (21-for-49) with five home runs on his birthday. The next day, in the final regular-season at-bat at Dodger Stadium of his career, Jones knocked in the winning run in the top of the ninth inning. On May 2, Jones capped off a wild extra-inning contest with the Philadelphia Phillies by hitting a two-run walk-off homer in the bottom of the 11th inning. He referred to the game-winning home run as one of the best individual moments of his career, as it finished a 15–13 Braves win that saw the team rally from two deficits of five runs or more.

During a May 18 game at Tampa Bay, Jones was hit by a ground ball and suffered a severe contusion to his left leg. On May 25, he was placed on the DL after it became clear that the injury would require more time to heal. Jones returned to the Braves' lineup on June 10.

Jones hit his 460th home run off Trevor Cahill of the Arizona Diamondbacks on June 27, putting him in 33rd place all time among MLB hitters. Jones also reached 33rd in career MLB doubles, passing Lou Gehrig during the same series with Arizona on June 29.

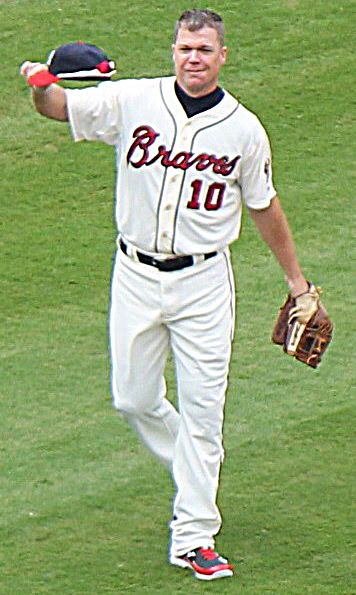
Jones salutes the crowd at Turner Field prior to his final regular season game.

On July 3, Jones was named to the NL All-Star team as a replacement for the injured Matt Kemp. That same day, he had his third career five-hit game, his first since 2002. He made it known that he wished the National League would win the All-Star game in his pregame address to his NL teammates:

We got an opportunity to [continue the NL winning streak]. And I am not going out losing my last one...

— Chipper Jones

During the All-Star game (the only time in his 19-year career that he played in Kansas City), Jones hit a single into right field in his only at bat during the game, and the National League won 8–0. At the All-Star Game break after July 8, Jones was hitting .318 with 6 home runs and 33 RBIs.

On August 16, Jones hit two home runs and collected his 2,700th hit. On September 12, Jones recorded his 1,500th walk in a game against the Milwaukee Brewers, becoming the first switch hitter in MLB history to obtain at least 2,500 hits, 1,500 RBIs, 1,500 runs and 1,500 walks. Jones also joined Stan Musial, Babe Ruth, Ted Williams, and Lou Gehrig as the only players in major league history to record at least 2,500 hits, 1,500 walks, 1,500 runs, 500 doubles, 450 home runs, and 1,500 RBIs while hitting .300 with a .400 on-base percentage and .500 slugging percentage.

Jones ended his career hitting over .300 from each side of home plate. Among switch-hitters with at least 5,000 career at-bats, the only other player to do so is Frankie Frisch. He and Mickey Mantle are the only two switch-hitters in MLB history to have an on-base percentage of .400, slugging percentage of .500, and 400 homers in their careers. Jones also has the most RBIs of any player who was primarily a third baseman.

The final game of his career was the 2012 NL Wild Card Game (dubbed the "infield fly rule game" following a controversial call by umpire Sam Holbrook), in which the Braves lost 6–3. In his final at-bat, Jones hit a broken-bat single for an infield base hit with two outs in the bottom of the ninth inning.

== Post-baseball ==
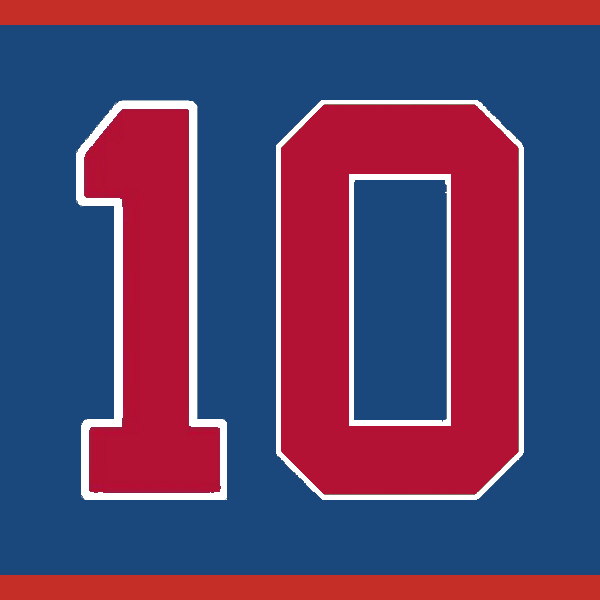
Chipper Jones's number 10 was retired by the Atlanta Braves in 2013.

In February 2013, the Atlanta Braves announced that they would induct Jones into the Braves Hall of Fame and retire his number, 10. Jones's Braves Hall of Fame induction ceremony took place on June 28 during a luncheon at the Atlanta Marriott Marquis and featured speeches from former Braves players, including Hank Aaron. Jones's number retirement ceremony also took place on June 28 prior to the Braves' game against the Arizona Diamondbacks. Jones, who approached the podium as his former walk-up song ("Crazy Train" by Ozzy Osbourne) played in the background, was joined onstage by former Braves owner Ted Turner, Braves president John Schuerholz, former Braves player Dale Murphy, then-current Braves player Dan Uggla, and former Braves manager Bobby Cox, as well as his parents and children. During his speech, Jones also recognized former Braves teammates Martín Prado, Randall Delgado, and Eric Hinske, who were all traded to or signed by the Diamondbacks during that offseason. His number 10 is the 11th number retired by the Braves franchise. Jones's number 10 jersey was also retired by the Durham Bulls on August 20.

During a 2014 winter storm, Jones rescued former teammate Freddie Freeman. Freeman was stuck in a traffic jam for hours. Jones came to the rescue on his ATV, and pulled Freeman out of the jam. At the start of the new year in 2016, the Atlanta Braves announced a "Chipper Rescues Freddie" bobblehead night for the upcoming season to honor the rescue.

Jones returned to the Braves as an adviser for the 2016 season.

Jones was announced as one of the four (alongside Jim Thome, Vladimir Guerrero, and Trevor Hoffman) inducted into the National Baseball Hall of Fame on January 24, 2018. He was the second first-overall draft pick to be elected to the Hall of Fame, after Ken Griffey Jr.

On March 1, 2020, Jones was hired by ESPN to be a color analyst on Wednesday Night Baseball broadcasts. Jones left ESPN in the off-season after Jon Sciambi, his primary broadcast partner, joined the Marquee Sports Network as the play-by-play announcer for its Chicago Cubs telecasts.

In February 2021, the Braves hired Jones as a part-time hitting consultant. For his role with the team, Jones received his second World Series championship ring when the Braves won the 2021 World Series.

The 2025 Major League Baseball All-Star Game was dedicated to Jones, Andres Galarraga, and Andruw Jones on the occasion of the 25th anniversary of the 2000 Major League Baseball All-Star Game. All three threw out the ceremonial first pitches to conclude the player introduction ceremonies.

== Personal life ==
Jones met his first wife, Karin Fulford, while he was playing with the Braves class A affiliate in Macon, Georgia. The couple married in 1992 and divorced in 2000, after it was revealed that Jones had an 18-month extramarital affair with a Hooters waitress that produced a son born in 1998.

Jones married second wife Sharon Logonov in March 2000 in Pierson, Florida. They have three sons. As of June 14, 2012, Jones and his wife Sharon had separated. Their divorce was finalized in November of the same year.

Soon after his divorce from Logonov, Jones began dating former Playboy model Taylor Higgins. Jones and Higgins were married on June 14, 2015. On June 21, 2016, Jones and Higgins announced via Twitter that they were expecting a baby in January 2017. Their first son was born on January 11, 2017, in Atlanta; their second was born on August 9, 2018.

Jones enjoys deer hunting. Jones was a co-owner of Outdoor Channel's hunting show Buck Commander with friends and pro athletes Adam LaRoche, Ryan Langerhans, Tom Martin, and Willie Robertson. Currently, he is co-owner and co-host of the television show Major League Bowhunter airing on the Sportsman Channel, with longtime friend Matt Duff.

In 2008, Jones released a charity wine called "Chipper Chardonnay," with a portion of the proceeds supporting the Miracle League, an organization serving children with disabilities and The Rally Foundation, a charity dedicated to raising funds for childhood cancer research.

== Career highlights ==
Award / Honor	Time(s)	Date(s)
NL All-Star	8	1996, 1997, 1998, 2000, 2001, 2008, 2011, 2012
NL Player of the Week	4	April 13–19, 1998, July 29 – August 4, 2002, June 26 – July 2, 2006, June 2–8, 2008
NL Silver Slugger Award (3B)	2	1999, 2000
NL Batting Champion	1	2008
NL Most Valuable Player	1	1999
NL Sporting News Rookie of the Year Award (3B)	1	1995
World Series champion	1	1995
First overall draft pick	1	1990

== See also ==
- List of Major League Baseball home run records
- List of Major League Baseball batting champions
- List of Major League Baseball career hits leaders
- List of Major League Baseball career doubles leaders
- List of Major League Baseball career runs scored leaders
- List of Major League Baseball career runs batted in leaders
- List of Major League Baseball career home run leaders
- List of Major League Baseball players who spent their entire career with one franchise

Awards and achievements
Preceded by Raúl Mondesí	Sporting News NL Rookie of the Year; 1995	Succeeded by Jason Kendall
Preceded by Raúl Mondesí	Players Choice NL Most Outstanding Rookie; 1995	Succeeded by Todd Hollandsworth
Preceded by Jose Oliva	Topps Rookie All-Star Third Baseman; 1995	Succeeded by Joe Randa
