= List of Major League Baseball career games played as a third baseman leaders =

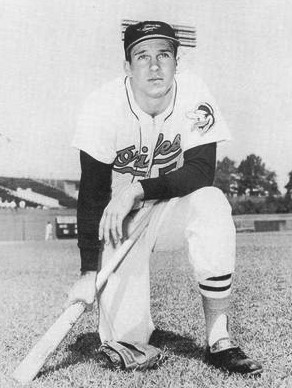
Brooks Robinson, the all-time leader in games played as a third baseman.

Games played (most often abbreviated as G or GP) is a statistic used in team sports to indicate the total number of games in which a player has participated (in any capacity); the statistic is generally applied irrespective of whatever portion of the game is contested. In baseball, the statistic applies also to players who, before a game, are included on a starting lineup card or are announced as ex ante substitutes, whether or not they play; however, in Major League Baseball, the application of this statistic does not extend to consecutive games played streaks. A starting pitcher, then, may be credited with a game played even if he is not credited with a game started or an inning pitched. Third base is the third of four stations on a baseball diamond which must be touched in succession by a baserunner in order to score a run for that player's team. A third baseman, abbreviated 3B, is the player on the team playing defense who fields the area nearest third base and is responsible for the majority of plays made at that base. In the scoring system used to record defensive plays, the third baseman is assigned the number 5.

Because third basemen routinely have to make the longest throws across the infield, and because of increasing expectations of their offensive contributions, they tend to be physically larger than middle infielders; however, they are generally expected to be quicker than first basemen, and the physical demands of playing third base have historically hindered players from having long careers at the position. When Eddie Yost became the first player to play 2,000 major league games at third base in 1962, it was nearly forty years after most other non-pitching positions had seen a player reach that milestone; the only position that took longer was catcher. Only 13 players have played 2,000 major league games at third base, tied for the fewest among infield positions; only three of the top 25 career leaders were in the major leagues before 1944, none of them before 1920. Brooks Robinson is the all-time leader in career games as a third baseman, playing 2,870 games at the position; it is the most games played at a single position by any player in major league history, and exceeded the previous record at the position by nearly 700 games. Adrián Beltré (2,759), Graig Nettles (2,412), Gary Gaetti (2,282), Wade Boggs (2,215), Mike Schmidt (2,212), Buddy Bell (2,183), Eddie Mathews (2,181), Ron Santo (2,130), Aramis Ramírez (2,112), Tim Wallach (2,054), Scott Rolen (2,023), and Eddie Yost (2,008) are the only other players to appear in over 2,000 career games at third base.

== Key ==
**Rank**	Rank amongst leaders in career games played. A blank field indicates a tie.
**Player (2026 Gs)**	Number of games played during the 2026 Major League Baseball season
**MLB**	Total career games played as a third baseman in Major League Baseball
*	Denotes elected to National Baseball Hall of Fame
**Bold**	Denotes active player (Note: A player is considered inactive if he has announced his retirement or not played for a full season.)

== List ==
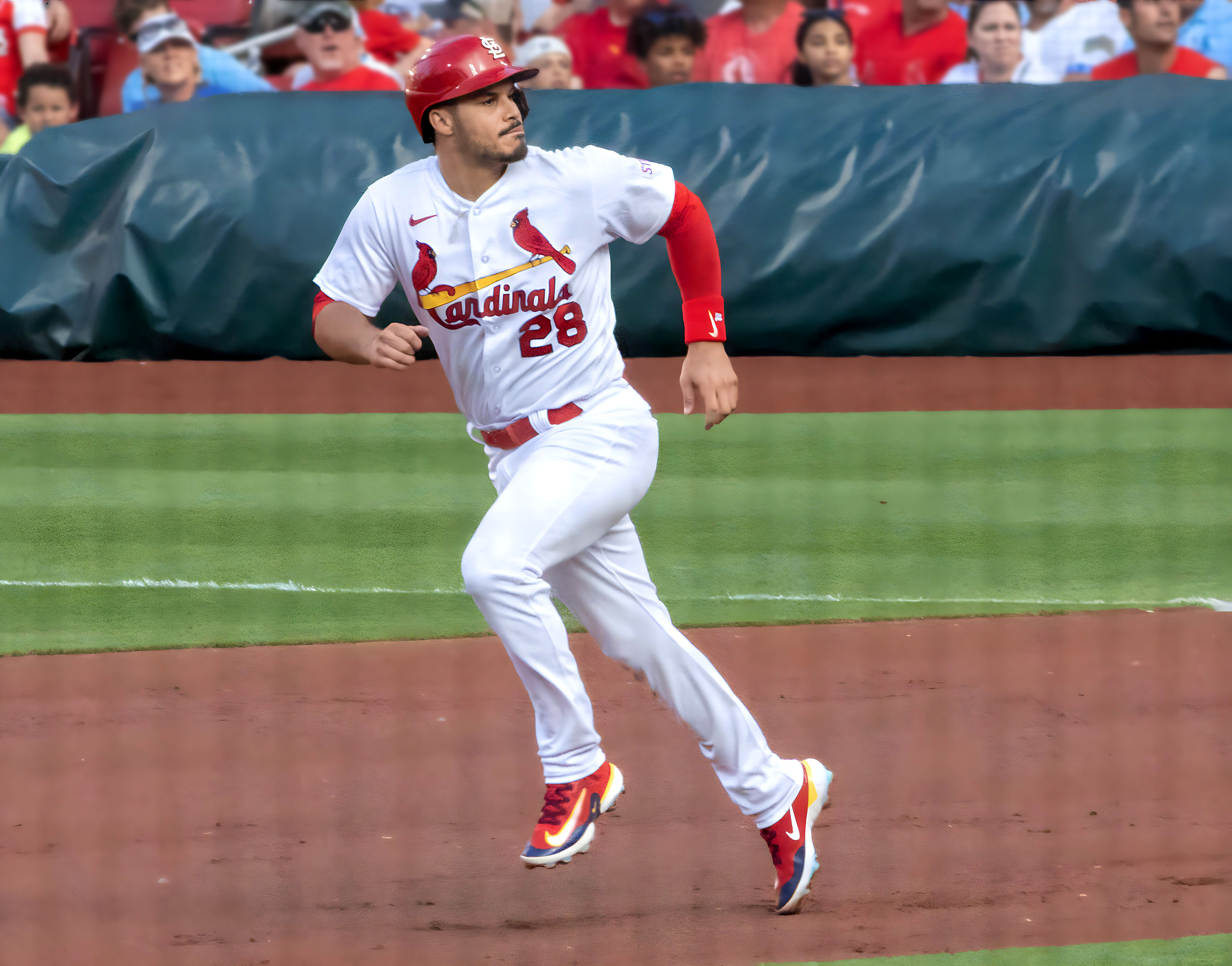
Nolan Arenado, the active leader and 19th all-time in games played as a third baseman.

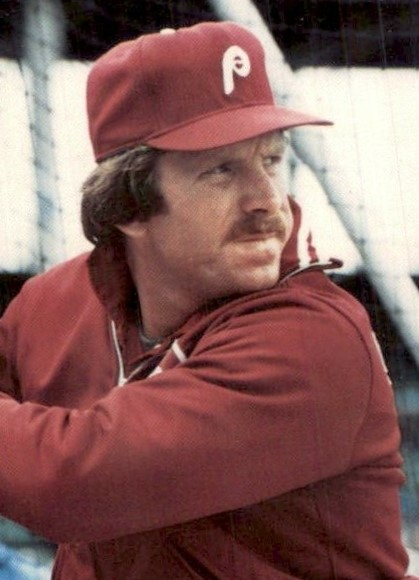
Mike Schmidt holds the National League record.

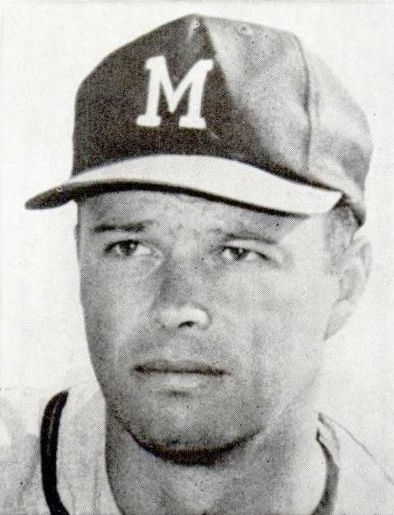
Eddie Mathews held the National League record for 23 years.

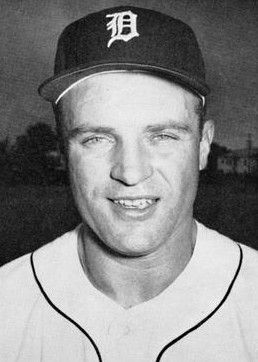
Eddie Yost was the first player to appear in 2,000 games at third base.

Pie Traynor held the major league record for 26 years.

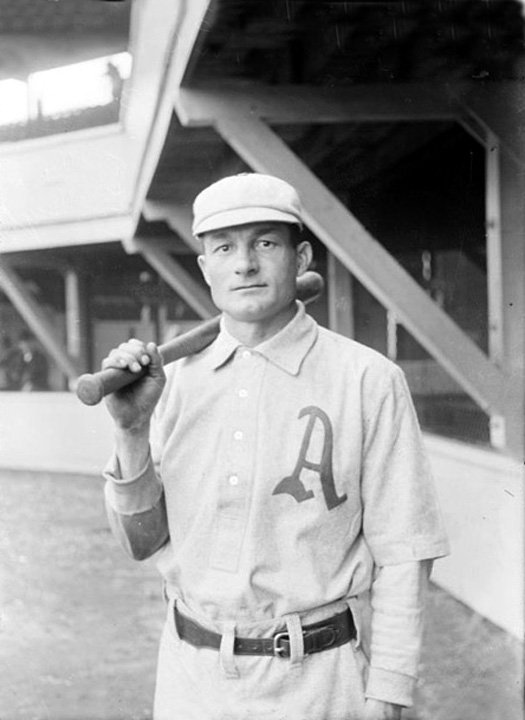
Lave Cross held the major league record for 28 years.

- Stats updated as of September 27, 2026.

Rank	Player (2026 Gs)	Games as third baseman			Other leagues, notes
Rank	Player (2026 Gs)	MLB	American League	National League	Other leagues, notes
1	Brooks Robinson*	2,870	2,870	0	
2	Adrián Beltré*	2,759	1,802	957	
3	Graig Nettles	2,412	1,997	415	
4	Gary Gaetti	2,282	1,817	465	
5	Wade Boggs*	2,215	2,215	0	
6	Mike Schmidt*	2,212	0	2,212	
7	Buddy Bell	2,183	1,744	439	
8	Eddie Mathews*	2,181	27	2,154	Held major league record, 1966–1971; held National League record, 1965–1988
9	Ron Santo*	2,130	28	2,102	
10	Aramis Ramírez	2,112	0	2,112	
11	Tim Wallach	2,054	46	2,008	
12	Scott Rolen*	2,023	203	1,820	
13	Eddie Yost	2,008	2,008	0	Held major league record, 1960–1966; held American League record, 1959–1970
14	Chipper Jones*	1,992	0	1,992	
15	Ron Cey	1,989	3	1,986	
16	Aurelio Rodríguez	1,983	1,895	88	
17	Sal Bando	1,896	1,896	0	
18	Robin Ventura	1,887	1,437	450	
19	**Nolan Arenado (145)**	1,876	0	1,876	
20	Pie Traynor*	1,863	0	1,863	Held major league record, 1934–1960; held National League record, 1931–1965
21	Stan Hack	1,836	0	1,836	
22	Evan Longoria	1,826	1,345	481	
23	Ken Boyer	1,785	38	1,747	
	Terry Pendleton	1,785	23	1,762	
25	Pinky Higgins	1,768	1,768	0	Held American League record, 1944–1959
26	Matt Williams	1,743	151	1,592	
27	Lave Cross	1,724	846	854	Includes 24 in American Association; held major league record, 1906–1934; held AL record, 1906–1907
28	Carney Lansford	1,720	1,720	0	
29	George Brett*	1,692	1,692	0	
	George Kell*	1,692	1,692	0	
31	Jimmy Collins*	1,683	948	735	Held American League record, 1901–1902
32	Ken Caminiti	1,676	53	1,623	
33	Willie Kamm	1,674	1,674	0	Held American League record, 1934–1944
34	**Manny Machado (139)**	1,673	715	958	
35	Vinny Castilla	1,656	107	1,549	
	Larry Gardner	1,656	1,656	0	Held American League record, 1921–1934
37	Willie Jones	1,614	4	1,610	
38	Arlie Latham	1,573	0	690	Includes 831 in American Association, 52 in Players' League; held major league record, 1891–1906
39	David Wright	1,572	0	1,572	
40	Harlond Clift	1,550	1,550	0	
41	Home Run Baker*	1,548	1,548	0	Held American League record, 1918–1920
42	Doug DeCinces	1,543	1,540	3	
43	Ken Keltner	1,500	1,500	0	
44	Todd Zeile	1,498	266	1,232	
45	Ossie Bluege	1,487	1,487	0	
46	Mike Lowell	1,474	535	939	
47	Billy Nash	1,468	0	1,291	Includes 132 in Players' League, 45 in American Association; held National League record, 1895–1910
48	Darrell Evans	1,442	35	1,407	
49	Bill Madlock	1,440	22	1,418	
50	Clete Boyer	1,439	928	511	
51	Jimmy Austin	1,431	1,431	0	Held American League record, 1917–1918, 1920–1921
52	Kyle Seager	1,427	1,427	0	
53	**Eugenio Suárez (50)**	1,417	342	1,075	
54	Jeff Cirillo	1,403	690	713	
55	Eric Chavez	1,402	1,339	63	
56	Bill Bradley	1,390	1,193	136	Includes 61 in Federal League; held American League record, 1902–1906, 1907–1917
57	Harry Steinfeldt	1,387	0	1,387	Held National League record, 1910–1931
58	Frank Malzone	1,370	1,370	0	
59	Bob Elliott	1,365	103	1,262	
60	Joe Randa	1,362	1,058	304	
61	Travis Fryman	1,359	1,359	0	
62	Pinky Whitney	1,358	0	1,358	
63	Doug Rader	1,349	45	1,304	
	Milt Stock	1,349	0	1,349	
65	Troy Glaus	1,337	1,037	300	
66	Charlie Hayes	1,328	256	1,072	
67	Ken Reitz	1,321	0	1,321	
68	Ken McMullen	1,318	1,201	117	
69	Heinie Groh	1,299	0	1,299	
70	**José Ramírez (99)**	1,284	1,284	0	
71	Billy Shindle	1,274	0	999	Includes 273 in American Association, 2 in Players' League
72	Steve Buechele	1,269	835	434	
73	Richie Hebner	1,262	32	1,230	
74	Jimmy Dykes	1,257	1,257	0	
75	**Alex Bregman (143)**	1,251	1,108	143	
76	**Matt Chapman (83)**	1,225	861	364	
77	Josh Donaldson	1,213	1,050	163	
78	Don Hoak	1,199	0	1,199	
79	Mike Mowrey	1,196	0	1,045	Includes 151 in Federal League
80	Bob Bailey	1,194	1	1,193	
	Alex Rodriguez	1,194	1,194	0	
82	Art Devlin	1,192	0	1,192	
83	Mike Pagliarulo	1,179	1,014	165	
84	Brook Jacoby	1,166	1,161	5	
85	Mike Moustakas	1,165	924	241	
86	Dean Palmer	1,162	1,162	0	
87	Eddie Foster	1,161	1,161	0	
88	Bobby Byrne	1,147	0	1,147	
89	Billy Werber	1,143	653	490	
90	Ryan Zimmerman	1,133	0	1,133	
91	Jim Davenport	1,130	0	1,130	
92	Bill Mueller	1,128	373	755	
93	Chase Headley	1,123	432	691	
94	Jerry Denny	1,109	0	1,109	Held National League record, 1887–1895
95	Doc Casey	1,100	259	841	
96	Toby Harrah	1,099	1,099	0	
97	Bob Aspromonte	1,094	0	1,094	
98	Denny Lyons	1,085	0	467	Includes 618 in American Association
99	Red Rolfe	1,084	1,084	0	
100	Brandon Inge	1,083	1,073	10	

== Other Hall of Famers ==
Player	Games as third baseman			Other leagues, notes
Player	MLB	American League	National League	Other leagues, notes
Deacon White*	827	0	762	Includes 64 in Players' League, 1 in National Association
Freddie Lindstrom*	809	0	809	
Harmon Killebrew*	791	791	0	
Paul Molitor*	791	791	0	
John McGraw*	782	88	694	
Tony Pérez*	760	0	760	
Judy Johnson*	682	0	0	Includes 355 in Eastern Colored League, 230 in Negro National League (second), 74 in American Negro League, 23 in East–West League (incomplete)
Cal Ripken Jr.*	675	675	0	
Dick Allen*	652	2	650	
Joe Sewell*	643	643	0	
Edgar Martínez*	564	564	0	
Bill McKechnie*	553	2	285	Includes 266 in Federal League
George Davis*	529	0	529	
Joe Torre*	515	0	515	
Jim Thome*	493	493	0	
Frankie Frisch*	459	0	459	
Bobby Wallace*	426	96	330	
Jud Wilson*	358	0	0	Includes 224 in Negro National League (second), 109 in Eastern Colored League, 18 in East–West League, 7 in American Negro League (incomplete)
Jackie Robinson*	256	0	256	
Cap Anson*	220	0	118	Includes 102 in National Association
Honus Wagner*	210	0	210	
Johnny Bench*	195	0	195	
Rogers Hornsby*	192	2	190	
Ray Dandridge*	160	0	0	Includes 160 in Negro National League (second) (incomplete)
Jeff Kent*	157	55	102	
Jim O'Rourke*	148	0	119	Includes 29 in National Association
Jimmie Foxx*	141	125	16	
Ryne Sandberg*	133	0	133	
Buck Ewing*	127	0	127	
Roger Connor*	111	0	111	
King Kelly*	96	0	86	Includes 8 in American Association, 2 in Players' League
Joe Cronin*	69	69	0	
Willie Wells*	49	0	0	Includes 44 in Negro National League (second), 4 in Negro American League, 1 in Negro National League (first) (incomplete)
