= Nolan Arenado =

American baseball player (born 1991)

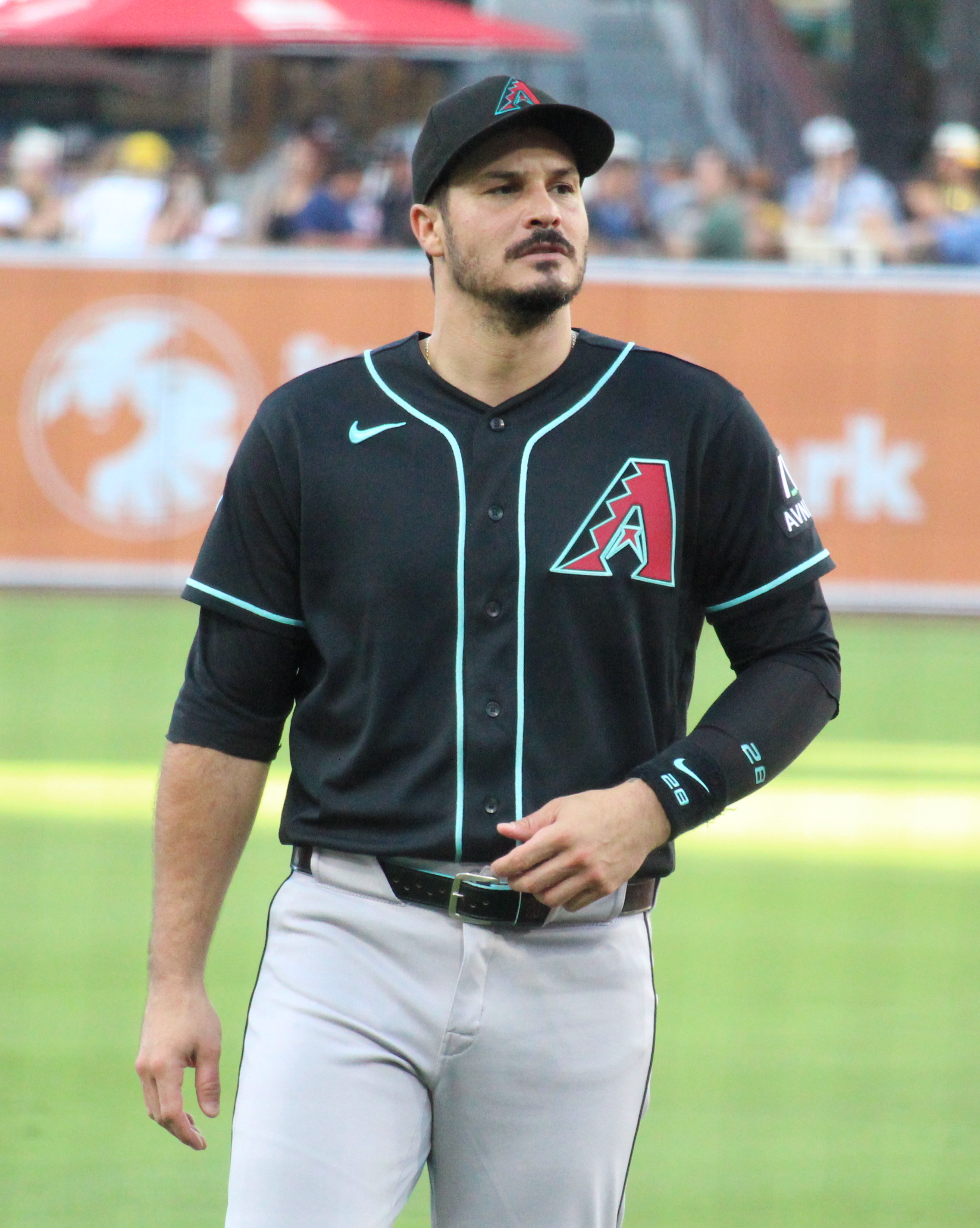
- Arenado with the Arizona Diamondbacks in 2026

Arizona Diamondbacks – No. 28
- Third baseman
- Born: April 16, 1991 (age 35); Newport Beach, California, U.S.
- Bats: Right Throws: Right

MLB debut
- April 28, 2013, for the Colorado Rockies

MLB statistics (through 2026 season)
- Batting average: .280
- Hits: 2,057
- Home runs: 383
- Runs batted in: 1,270
- Stats at Baseball Reference

Teams
- Colorado Rockies (2013–2020); St. Louis Cardinals (2021–2025); Arizona Diamondbacks (2026–present)

Career highlights and awards
- 8× All-Star (2015–2019, 2021–2023); 10× Gold Glove Award (2013–2022); 5× Silver Slugger Award (2015–2018, 2022); 3× NL home run leader (2015, 2016, 2018); 2× NL RBI leader (2015, 2016)
Medals
Men's baseball
Representing United States
World Baseball Classic
Gold medal – first place	2017 Los Angeles	Team
Silver medal – second place	2023 Miami	Team

Nolan James Arenado (/ˌærəˈnɑːdoʊ/; born April 16, 1991) is an American professional baseball third baseman for the Arizona Diamondbacks of Major League Baseball (MLB). Arenado is widely recognized as one of the best defensive third basemen of all time. He is the only infielder to win the Rawlings Gold Glove Award in each of his first ten MLB seasons. He made his MLB debut with the Colorado Rockies in 2013 and was traded to the St. Louis Cardinals before the 2021 season. With the Cardinals, Arenado and teammate Paul Goldschmidt became a highly-regarded infield duo, each of them being named finalists for the National League MVP Award in 2022. In January 2026, he was traded for the second time in his career, joining the Diamondbacks.

A native of Newport Beach, California, Arenado attended El Toro High School in Lake Forest before becoming the Rockies' second-round selection in the 2009 MLB draft. An eight-time MLB All-Star, his defensive accolades (in addition to his ten Gold Gloves) include four total (and three consecutive) Fielding Bible Awards and three consecutive Wilson Defensive Player of the Year Awards, as well as six consecutive Rawlings Platinum Gloves. Offensively, he is a five-time Silver Slugger Award winner and has twice led the league in both home runs and runs batted in (RBI), and currently leads all major leaguers in RBIs since the start of the 2015 season.

During his minor league career, Arenado was a two-time All-Star Futures Game selection, and led the minor leagues in RBI in 2011 with 155 over 163 total games. In 2016, Arenado became the youngest player in Rockies franchise history to reach 100 home runs. He has hit for the cycle twice: once on June 18, 2017, and again on July 1, 2022. He became the sixth player in history to finish off such a performance with a walk-off home run. In 2017, he became the 11th major leaguer and first third baseman in history to drive in 130 or more runs in three successive seasons.

In international competition, Arenado has represented both the United States and Puerto Rico. Arenado helped Team USA win their first World Baseball Classic (WBC) gold medal in 2017, and additionally earned a silver medal in 2023. For the 2026 tournament, he represented Puerto Rico.

== Early life ==
Nolan James Arenado was born on April 16, 1991, in Newport Beach, California, and raised in nearby Lake Forest, an Orange County city between Irvine, Mission Viejo and Laguna Hills. His father, Fernando, is of Cuban ancestry, and his mother, Millie, a native of Queens, New York, is of Cuban and Puerto Rican ancestry. He has an older brother, Fernando Jr., and his younger brother, Jonah, was a corner infielder in the San Francisco Giants organization. A first cousin, Josh Fuentes, is an infielder who has played for the Rockies. The two were teammates in 2019 and 2020.

Arenado grew up a Los Angeles Dodgers fan. He attended El Toro High School in Lake Forest, and played shortstop on the school's baseball team with fellow future major leaguers Austin Romine and Matt Chapman. In 2008, Arenado's junior year, El Toro won the California Interscholastic Federation Southern Section championship. He was named to the Los Angeles Times' All-Star team after leading his division with a .456 batting average, 32 runs batted in (RBI), and 33 runs scored.

As a senior, Arenado batted .517, .615 on-base percentage (OBP), five home runs (HR), 14 doubles, and a triple, and was again named to the Los Angeles Times' All-Star team. He committed to attend Arizona State University (ASU) on a college baseball scholarship.

== Professional career ==
=== Draft and minor leagues (2009–12) ===
The Colorado Rockies selected Arenado in the second round with the 59th overall selection of the 2009 MLB draft. Rather than attend ASU, he signed with the Rockies, and made his professional baseball debut with the Casper Ghosts of the Rookie-level Pioneer League, where he batted .300. In 2010, Arenado played for the Asheville Tourists of the Single-A South Atlantic League, where he posted a .308 batting average and 41 doubles.

Before the 2011 season, Baseball America ranked Arenado as the Rockies' third-best prospect and 80th overall. He was highly acclaimed as a hitter, less so as a defender. While playing for the Modesto Nuts of the High-A California League, he began working harder on his defense. While he had previously demonstrated exceptional arm strength and soft hands, they were neutralized by his inept footwork. Arenado later recalled that he "had really bad feet," and "was too lazy," for which Modesto manager Jerry Weinstein relentlessly scolded him. He tasked Arenado to take ground balls earlier than the other players and to move rapidly and precisely and maintain readiness at third base. In addition, Arenado began lifting weights in earnest while pushing himself to improve. The work ultimately gave him a combination of explosive vigor, ingenuity, and finesse that allowed him to cover large areas and make good long and short throws from postures ranging from upright to nearly laying down.

Along with Wilin Rosario, Arenado represented the Rockies at the 2011 All-Star Futures Game. His first-half totals included a .283 batting average with six home runs and 42 RBI. He finished the season with a .298 batting average and 20 home runs, leading the minor leagues with 122 RBI. Later in the year, Arenado was named the Most Valuable Player (MVP) of the Arizona Fall League (AFL) after hitting .388 with six home runs and 33 RBI. In 163 games combined in the California League and AFL in 2011, Arenado batted .315 with 201 base hits, 155 RBI, 26 home runs and 44 doubles. Playing for the Tulsa Drillers of the Double-A Texas League in 2012, he was again named to appear in the All-Star Futures Game. Arenado finished the year with a .285 batting average, 12 home runs, and 56 RBI.

=== Colorado Rockies (2013–2020) ===
==== 2013−14 ====
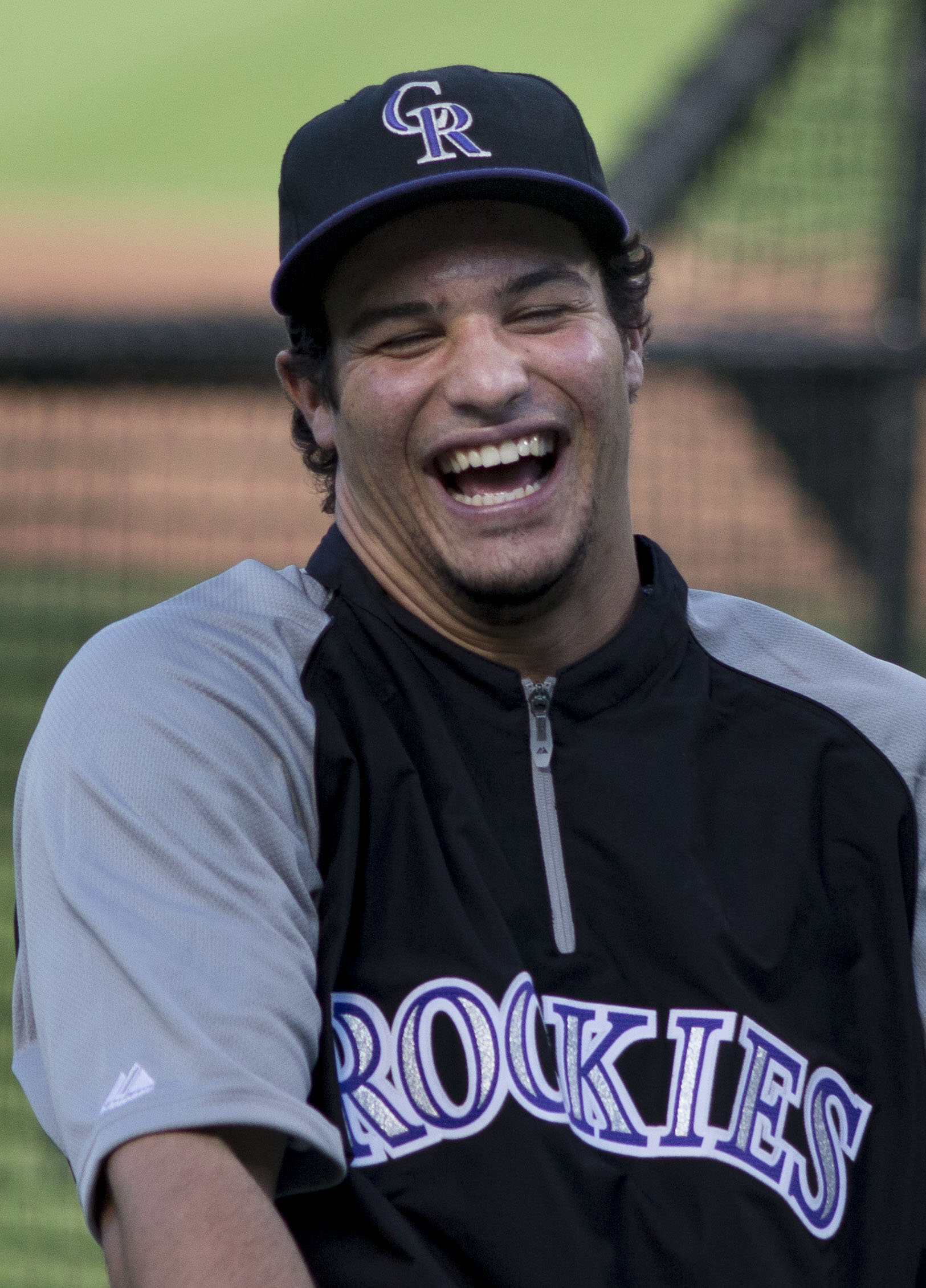
Arenado in 2013

Despite a strong spring training showing in 2013, the Rockies optioned Arenado to the Colorado Springs Sky Sox of the Triple-A Pacific Coast League (PCL) to start the season. Through April 28, he batted .364, 1.059 on-base plus slugging percentage (OPS), three home runs, and 21 RBI with Colorado Springs. At that point, Colorado promoted him to the major league club, and designated Chris Nelson for assignment to make room on the roster.

Arenado went 0-for-3 in his MLB debut against the Arizona Diamondbacks at Chase Field. He recorded his first three MLB hits in his second game—including his first MLB home run off of pitcher Josh Wall—in a 12–2 win versus the Los Angeles Dodgers. In his sixth game, he hit his first major league grand slam and second career home run off Tampa Bay Rays pitcher David Price. Arenado's defensive dominance translated smoothly to the major leagues, as ESPN.com published on September 7 that he would have ranked second for a hypothetical National League (NL) Defensive MVP Award. He trailed only shortstop Andrelton Simmons for the league lead in Defensive Runs Saved (DRS), 38–30. He appeared in 133 major league games and slashed .267/.301/.405 with 10 home runs and 52 RBI. Defensively, he led NL third basemen in range factor both per game (3.08) and per nine innings (3.24), and was second in putouts (91), assists (309) and double plays turned (tied with two others with 27).

On October 29, 2013, Arenado became the first NL rookie to win a Rawlings Gold Glove Award at third base, and the first in both major leagues since Frank Malzone won in the American League in 1957. Arenado tied for seventh place with Evan Gattis in the NL Rookie of the Year Award voting which was won by José Fernández with Arenado receiving the most votes as a third baseman.

The first multi-home run game of Arenado's career occurred on April 5, 2014, against Brandon McCarthy of the Arizona Diamondbacks in a 9–4 Rockies win. On May 8, Arenado hit safely in his 28th consecutive game to break the Rockies' franchise hit streak record, which Michael Cuddyer set the previous season. On May 23, Arenado suffered a mallet fracture of his left middle finger on a headfirst slide into second base in a game against the Atlanta Braves, and was subsequently placed on the 15-day disabled list (DL).

Arenado missed 37 games due to the fracture and returned on June 28. He earned his first career NL Player of the Week Award for the week ending August 24. He batted .545 with a 1.645 OPS and 12 hits, three doubles, one triple, two home runs, three RBI, and six runs scored. Due to a chest contusion and early onset pneumonia, Arenado missed additional time at the end of the season. On the year, he batted .287/.328/.500, hitting 18 home runs and driving in 61 runs. He won his second Gold Glove Award despite playing in just 111 games.

==== 2015 ====
In 2015, Arenado earned his second NL Player of the Week Award on June 28, hitting a major league-leading three multi-home runs games in six games, seven home runs and 14 RBI. He also scored 10 times, second-highest in the major leagues. He became an MLB All-Star for the first time as a National League reserve at Great American Ball Park in Cincinnati. At the time his selection was announced, he was fifth in the majors in home runs with 24 and led in RBI with 68. He had hit more home runs in road games than at Coors Field (15 to nine), more RBI (37 to 31) and posted higher on-base (.318 to .309) and slugging (.615 to .580) percentages. Playing against the San Francisco Giants on September 5, Arenado homered in his sixth consecutive game, breaking the Rockies' team record of five which Dante Bichette and Larry Walker shared. He won his first NL Player of the Month award in September, batting .339 and leading the major leagues with 11 home runs, 32 RBI, and 79 total bases. He collected an NL-leading 38 hits and was second in the league with .705 SLG.

For the 2015 season, Arenado tied Bryce Harper for the NL home run title with 42, and led the National League with 130 RBI and 354 total bases."2015 National League Batting Leaders". Baseball-Reference.com. In addition, he batted .287 with a .323 OBP, .575 SLG, .898 OPS, 43 doubles, and 11 sacrifice flies (leading the majors) on his way to winning his first Silver Slugger Award for third basemen. He was the first Rockies player to lead the NL in home runs since Walker hit 49 in 1997 and the first to lead the majors in RBI since Andrés Galarraga with 150 in 1996. Additionally, Arenado set a major league record for extra base hits by a third baseman in one season with 89, surpassing Chipper Jones' total of 87 in 1999.

On defense, Arenado won his third consecutive Gold Glove, and, for the first time, was the major league-wide winner among third basemen for both the Fielding Bible and the Wilson Defensive Player of the Year Awards. He became the second Rockies player to win the Fielding Bible at any position, following shortstop Troy Tulowitzki. The Colorado Sports Hall of Fame named Arenado the winner of their Professional Athlete of the Year Award for 2015. He received official consideration for the NL MVP Award for the first time, ranking eighth in voting behind Harper, Paul Goldschmidt, Joey Votto, Anthony Rizzo, Andrew McCutchen, Jake Arrieta, and Zack Greinke.

==== 2016 ====
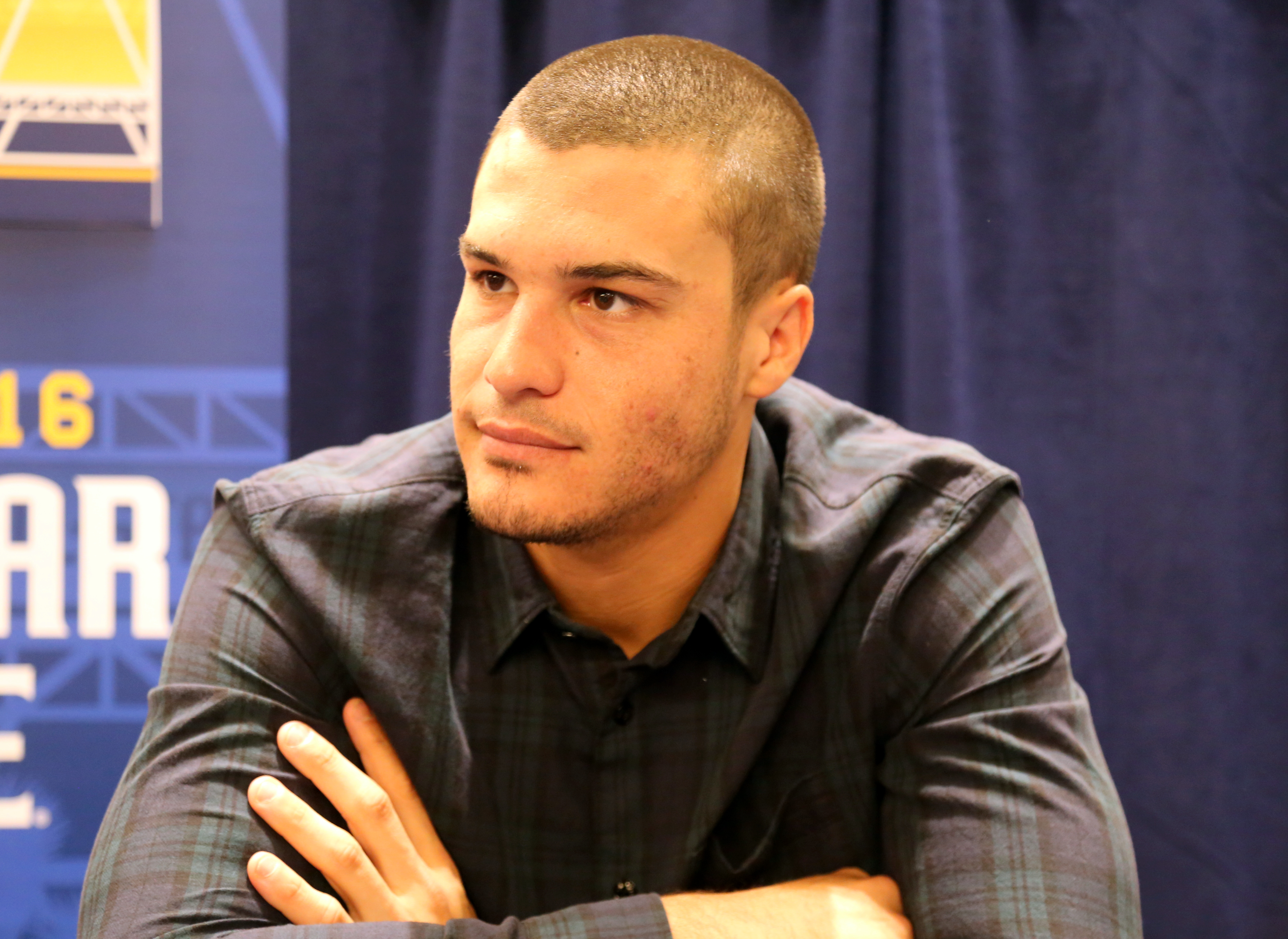
Arenado at the 2016 Major League Baseball All-Star Game.

Arenado and the Rockies avoided salary arbitration on January 15, 2016, agreeing to a one-year, $5 million contract, a raise from $512,000 in 2015. He was named NL co-Player of the Week with Harper for April 18 after leading the NL with four home runs and 12 RBI. He also carried an .852 SLG, led the NL with 23 total bases, and tied for second with seven runs scored. Arenado made his second All-Star Game, played at Petco Park in San Diego. He hit his 100th career home run on August 8, making him the youngest player in franchise history to do so, at just under age 25 years and four months.

In September Arenado became the second player aged 25 and younger within the previous 75 seasons to drive in 125 runs in successive seasons. Overall, in 160 games, Arenado finished the year tied with Chris Carter for the National League at a batting average of .294, 182 hits, 35 doubles, 116 runs scored, an MLB-leading 133 RBI, 82 extra base hits, 68 walks (double the number from 2015), a .362 OBP, a .570 SLG and a .932 OPS. Arenado won his fourth consecutive Gold Glove at the third base position, becoming the first third baseman in MLB history to win four Gold Gloves in his first four seasons, as well as his second Silver Slugger, Fielding Bible and Wilson Defensive Player of the Year Awards. He also became the first player in Rockies history to lead the Majors in RBIs in two separate seasons. Arenado finished in fifth place in the NL MVP Award voting behind Kris Bryant, Daniel Murphy, Corey Seager and Rizzo, receiving almost double the number of vote points as he had gotten the year before (199 points in 2016 vs. 102 in 2015).

==== 2017 ====
Before spring training, on January 13, 2017, Arenado and the Rockies avoided arbitration for the second straight year by agreeing to a two-year, $29.5 million contract. He received $11,750,000 for 2017 followed by $17,750,000 during the 2018 season. On June 18, he hit for the cycle against the San Francisco Giants. The home run was a walk-off hit off closer Mark Melancon, finishing off a 7−5 Rockies win. It was just the sixth time (Note: According to Elias Sports Bureau, it was only the fifth time in MLB history.) in MLB history that a hitter completed the cycle with a walk-off home run; Arenado's teammate Carlos González was the previous to do so, on July 31, 2010. The 288th cycle in MLB history, Arenado's was the eighth by a Rockies player, and the 17th overall at Coors Field. During the June 28 game against the Giants, he knocked down a line drive batted by pitcher Ty Blach as he was facing third base, spun on his stomach, and, without getting up on his feet, threw out Blach at first base.

For the first time in his career, Arenado was selected to start in the MLB All-Star Game, played at Marlins Park in Miami, after receiving the most fan votes of all National League third baseman. His third overall selection, Arenado batted sixth and collected two singles in two at bats. Arenado set career-highs with three home runs and five hits, while tying a career-high seven RBI in an 18–4 rout of the San Diego Padres on July 19. He tied the franchise record held by Jeff Cirillo and Todd Walker for the number of total bases in a single game with 14, and became the first player in Rockies history to reach both three home runs and five hits in a single game. He also became the first player in the majors to reach 80 RBI. Named Player of the Week for the fourth time of his career on July 23, Arenado hit .458/.480/1.000 with four home runs and 13 RBI in five games. He later won the Player of the Month Award for July, his second monthly award, after hitting .389/.423/.744 with eight home runs, 35 hits, 15 extra base hits, 30 RBIs and 18 runs scored in 22 games.

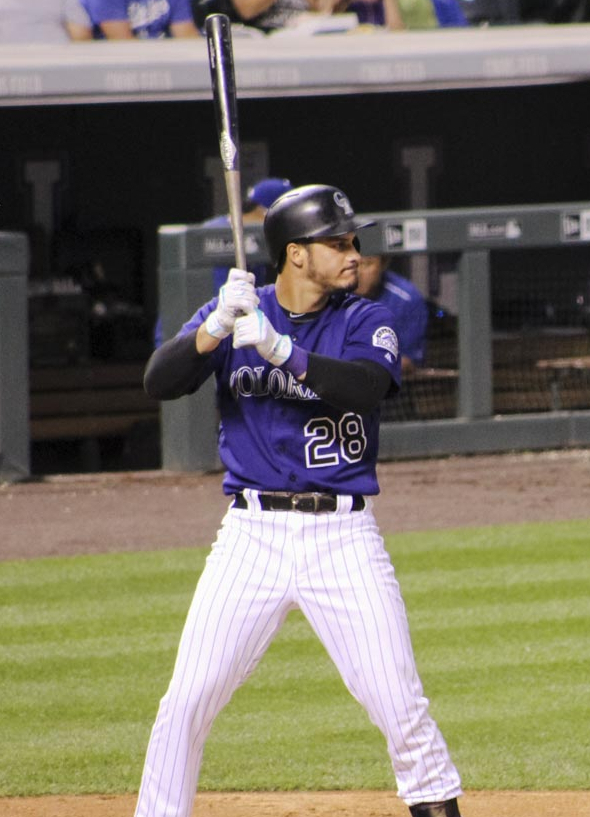
Arenado with the Rockies in 2016

With a two-run home run versus José Ureña of the Miami Marlins on August 11, Arenado became the first major leaguer of 2017 to reach 100 RBI for the third year in a row, doing so in 112 games. He had batted .441 and 77 RBI with runners in scoring position (RISP) in those 112 games. He was ejected by umpire Pat Hoberg from the August 12 game in the seventh inning versus Miami for throwing his bat. Arenado's batting turn was up in the ninth inning, before Miami prevailed, 4–3. A pitch from Vance Worley on August 14 hit him on the left hand. An X-ray revealed no fractures, and he was ruled to miss the DL, but swelling resulted. On September 16 versus the Padres, Arenado drove in his 125th run of the season, becoming the first third baseman and first Rockies player to do so in three consecutive seasons. Later that September, he became the 11th player and 1st third baseman in major league history to drive in 130 or more runs in three consecutive seasons. Writing for The Sporting News, Joe Rivera noted, that per Fangraphs, Arenado was the fourth player in history to net at least 100 defensive runs saved within his first five seasons (103). Through September 28, he had batted .365 and 1.297 OPS in situations of two outs and runners in scoring position for the season. Making his first postseason appearance in the NL Wild Card Game, Arenado went 1-for-5 with a home run and two runs scored as the Rockies lost to the Diamondbacks 11–8 at Chase Field, ending their season.

Arenado finished the season with a .309 batting average, 187 hits, 43 doubles, seven triples, 37 home runs (tied for third most in the league with teammate Charlie Blackmon and Miami's Marcell Ozuna), and 130 RBI. The RBI total was second to Giancarlo Stanton for the major league lead by two, resulting in Arenado just missing leading the majors for a third consecutive season. He also scored 100 runs, produced 87 extra base hits, 355 total bases, 62 walks, nine intentional walks, three stolen bases, .373 OBP, .586 SLG and .959 OPS over 159 games. He established or tied career highs in batting average, hits, doubles, triples, total bases, stolen bases, OBP, SLG and OPS.

End of campaign awards for Arenado included a selection as the third baseman of Baseball America's All-MLB Team and third successive Silver Slugger Award. He was the Players Choice for the Majestic Athletic Always Game Award, identifying "the player who constantly exhibits grit, tenacity, perseverance and hustle on and off the field, all for the benefit of his teammates and fans." Arenado was awarded his fifth straight Gold Glove Award, making him the first infielder to achieve this in each of his first five seasons in the major leagues. Only Ichiro Suzuki, as a right fielder, won more consecutive Gold Gloves to start his career (10). Arenado won his first Platinum Glove Award as the finest defensive member of all the National League, and a third succedent promotion of both the Fielding Bible and Wilson Defensive Player of the Year Awards for third base. He clinched fourth place in the NL MVP voting—the highest ranking of his career—behind Stanton, Votto and Goldschmidt, and ahead of fifth-place Blackmon.

==== 2018 ====
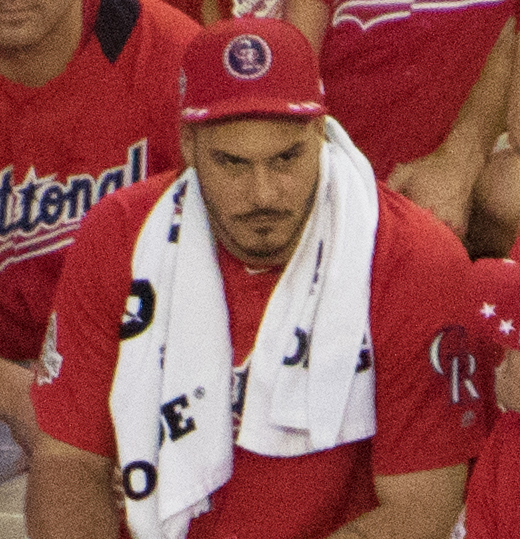
Arenado at the 2018 Major League Baseball Home Run Derby

Prior to the 2018 season, Sports Illustrated ranked Arenado as the eighth top overall player, and the "best defensive infielder in baseball. Third base is the deepest position in baseball today, but none can quite do what Arenado can." The Rockies and he agreed to defer contract extension negotiations until after the season.

On April 11, San Diego Padres pitcher Luis Perdomo threw a pitch behind Arenado, who charged the mound and incited a bench-clearing brawl. Two days later, the league suspended Arenado and Perdomo for five games. In his first game back, Arenado hit his 150th career home run versus Kyle Hendricks in a 16−5 loss to the Chicago Cubs. After homering and collecting at least two hits in each of four consecutive games, Arenado was named NL Player of the Week on June 25. His aggregate included .379/.419/.955 with five home runs, two doubles, seven runs scored, and 13 RBI.

After producing a first half batting .305, 22 home runs and 63 RBI, Arenado was voted to start the 2018 MLB All-Star Game for the second year in a row, and fourth selection overall. He finished his 2018 campaign slashing .297/.374/.561 with 38 home runs and 110 RBIs in 156 games, while also scoring 104 runs and notching 175 hits, 38 doubles, a career-high 73 walks, 331 total bases, 78 extra base hits, a .935 OPS, and a career-high 133 OPS+. After the season, he won his sixth consecutive Gold Glove and fourth consecutive Silver Slugger. He also won his second consecutive Rawlings Platinum Glove Award with his former high school teammate Matt Chapman. He also finished third in MVP voting behind the Cubs' Javier Baez and the Brewers' Christian Yelich.

==== 2019 ====
On February 26, 2019, Arenado agreed to an eight-year, $260 million contract extension with the Rockies. On May 25, he hit his 200th career home run, a three-run go-ahead shot, against the Baltimore Orioles. He was selected by fan vote to start in the MLB All-Star Game at third base for the National League, hosted in Cleveland.

Arenado finished the 2019 season hitting .315/.379/.583 in 154 games and making just nine errors, setting new career-highs in batting average, OBP, fielding percentage (.980), fWAR (5.9), bWAR (6.7), and on-base plus slugging (.962). He also ranked third in the National League in hits (185) and total bases (343), fourth in RBIs (118), and fifth in home runs (41), runs scored (104), batting average, slugging percentage and OPS. He also won his seventh straight Gold Glove Award and his third straight Platinum Glove Award and finished sixth in the MVP voting.

==== 2020 ====
During the offseason, it was reported that Arenado was unhappy in Colorado and had requested a trade, stating "there's a lot of disrespect from people there that I don't want to be a part of." General manager Jeff Bridich claimed that "we have listened to teams regarding Nolan and really nothing has come of it" and Arenado remained with Colorado for the 2020 season. In the pandemic-shortened 2020 season, Arenado batted .253/.303/.434 with eight home runs and 26 RBIs in 48 games. He won his eighth consecutive Gold Glove Award at third base, tying Scott Rolen for the third-most Gold Gloves at the position.

=== St. Louis Cardinals (2021–2025) ===
==== 2021 ====
On February 1, 2021, the St. Louis Cardinals acquired Arenado from the Rockies along with $51 million in exchange for Austin Gomber, Mateo Gil, Tony Locey, Elehuris Montero, and Jake Sommers.

Arenado hit his first home run as a Cardinal on March 29 at Great American Ball Park in a 9–6 loss to the Cincinnati Reds. He hit his first home run at Busch Stadium as a Cardinal in the team's home opener on April 8, a go-ahead two-run homer in a game in which the Cardinals won 3–1 over the Milwaukee Brewers. Arenado was named the National League's starting third baseman at the 2021 Major League Baseball All-Star Game in Denver. Arenado finished the 2021 season batting .255/.312/.494 with 34 home runs and 105 RBIs. Defensively, he led National League third basemen in putouts (125), double plays (38), and range factor per game (2.66). He won the Gold Glove Award at third base, one of five Cardinals to win that year, an MLB record. His ninth consecutive Gold Glove tied him with Mike Schmidt for the most consecutive awards by a National League third baseman. After the season, Arenado could have opted out of his contract with the Cardinals and become a free agent, but chose to remain with the club.

==== 2022 ====
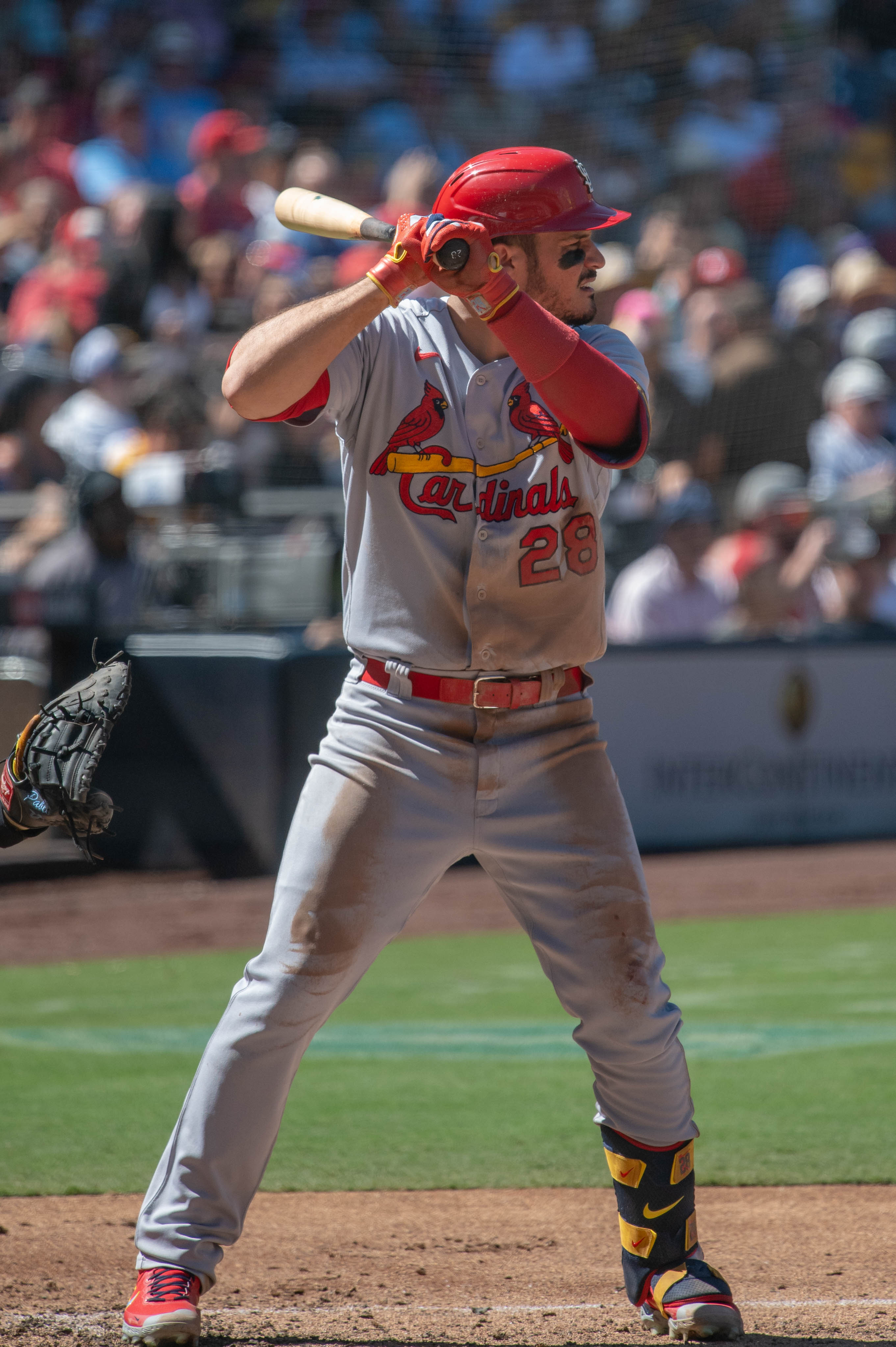
Arenado batting for the St. Louis Cardinals in 2022

On April 27, 2022, Arenado was ejected for inciting a bench-clearing brawl against the New York Mets after yelling at Yoan López for throwing near his head, assuming the throw was retaliation for the Cardinals having hit three Mets batters the night before. Arenado received a two-game suspension for the incident, but the suspension was reduced to one game after an appeal. He was named April Player of the Month for the National League after having batted .375 with five home runs, 17 RBIs, 12 extra-base hits and a league-leading 1.125 OPS. He was the first Cardinals third baseman to win the award since Ken Reitz in May of 1977.

Arenado struggled mightily in May, batting .196 during the month. He was able to turn it around in the following months of June and July, batting .309 with 10 home runs and 28 runs batted in.

On July 1, 2022, Arenado hit for his second career cycle in a 5–3 loss to the Philadelphia Phillies at Citizens Bank Park. He hit an RBI triple in the first inning, a two-run homer in the third inning, doubled in the sixth, and in the ninth, singled on a hard-hit grounder that caromed off third baseman Matt Vierling's glove. It was the 17th cycle in Cardinals history. The following game, Arenado hit the first of four consecutive home runs on July 2, 2022, the 11th such occurrence in major league history. Teammates Nolan Gorman, Juan Yepez and Dylan Carlson each followed suit off starter Kyle Gibson with two outs in the first inning. It was the first time that the Cardinals had accomplished the feat, and the first time that it occurred in the first inning. Arenado later won the game for St. Louis in the ninth inning with his second home run of the game, 7–6, which was also the 5,000th at bat of his career. Arenado was selected to represent the Cardinals at the All-Star Game in Los Angeles.

On July 24, it was announced that Arenado, along with teammate Paul Goldschmidt, would not be allowed to travel with the Cardinals to Toronto for a scheduled series against the Blue Jays, due to his lack of a COVID-19 vaccination.

Arenado was named NL Player of the Month for August. During the month, he batted a .364 average with 9 home runs and 29 runs batted in. His performance led St. Louis to a 22–7 record in August.

Arenado finished the 2022 season batting .293/.358/.533 with 30 home runs and 103 RBIs, making it seven seasons with 30+ home runs and 100+ runs batted in in his 10-year career. He had the lowest ground ball percentage of all major leaguers (29.7%). Defensively, Arenado led all third basemen with an ultimate zone rating of 13. He was awarded his tenth consecutive Gold Glove Award, tying with Ichiro Suzuki for the most consecutive Gold Gloves to start a career. He was named a finalist for the National League Most Valuable Player Award alongside teammate and eventual winner Paul Goldschmidt and Manny Machado. Arenado was awarded the Rawling Platinum Glove for the 6th consecutive year, as well as his 5th Silver Slugger.

==== 2023 ====
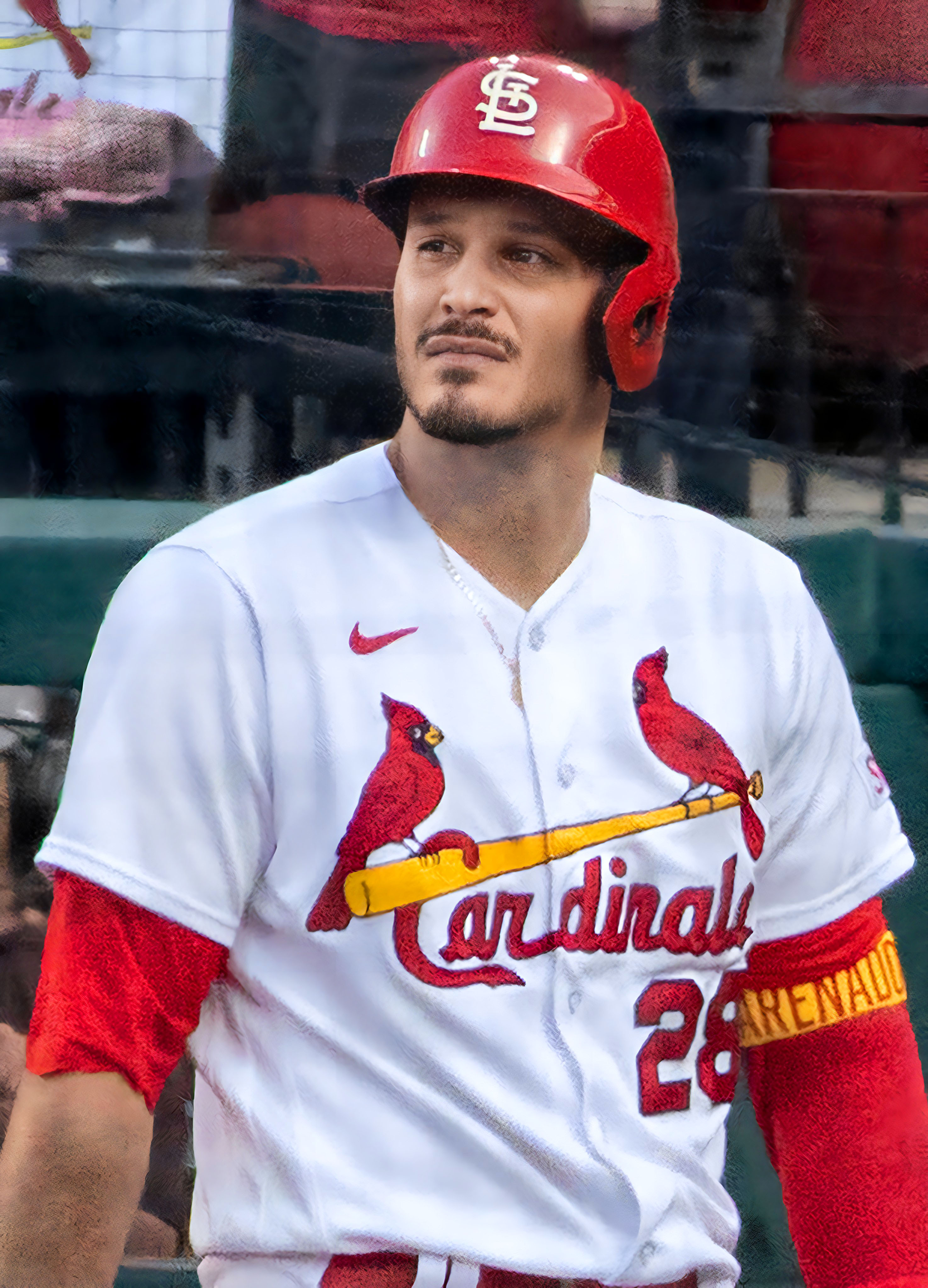
Arenado in 2023

On October 29, 2022, Arenado informed the Cardinals that he would again not opt out of his contract, ensuring he will remain under contract with St. Louis through the 2027 season. On April 8, 2023, Arenado hit his 300th career home run against Brewers pitcher Eric Lauer. He was named an All-Star for the eighth time and finished the season with a .266 average, 26 home runs, and 93 RBI.

==== 2024 ====
Arenado played in 152 games in 2024, though his season was marred by various injuries. His power production declined, as he finished with 16 home runs, his fewest in a full season since his rookie year. He did not make the All-Star Game for the first time since 2014, though he still finished with a .272 average.

==== 2025 ====
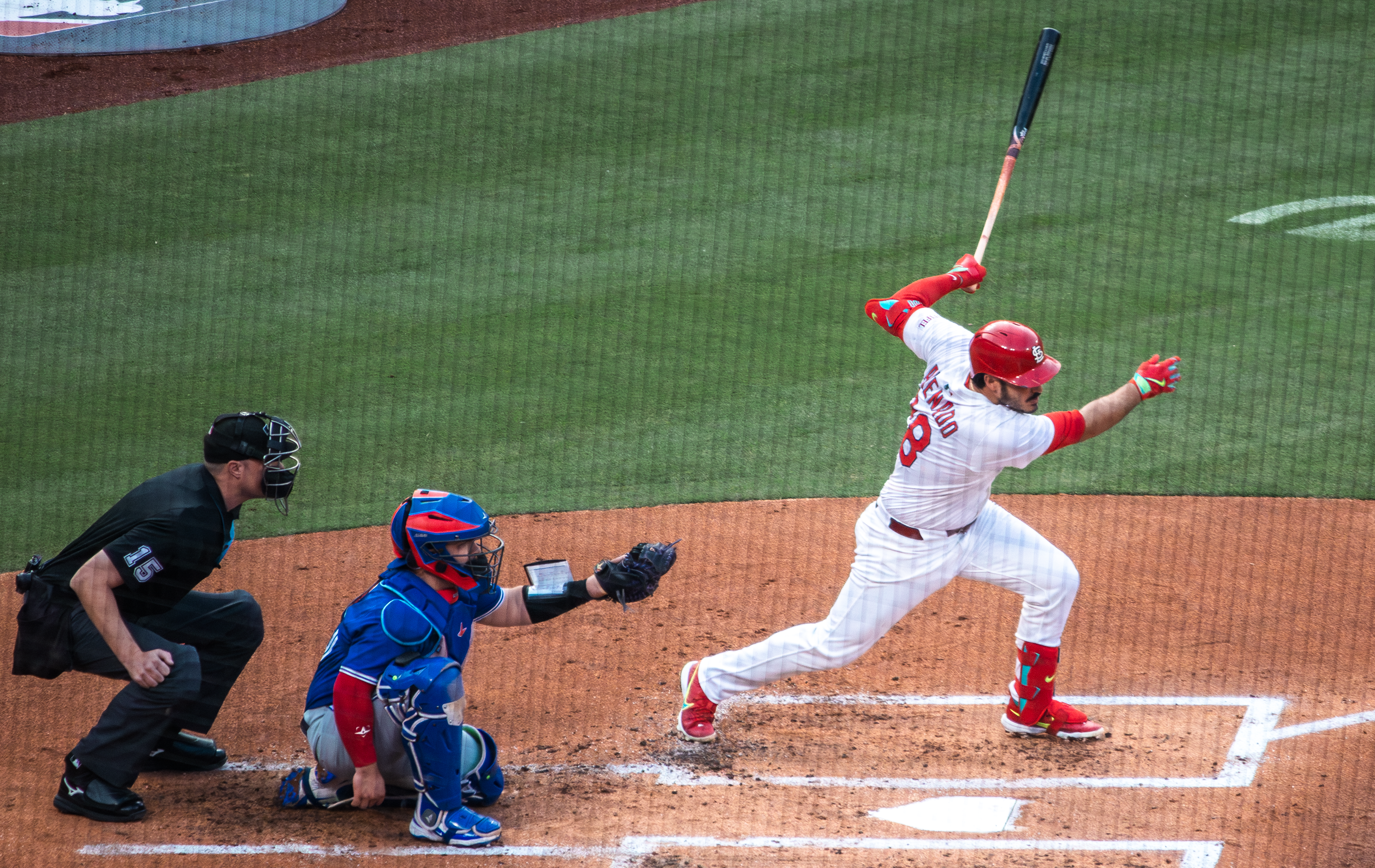
Arenaldo swings away against Toronto. 2025.

On June 19, 2025, Arenado hit his 350th career home run against the Chicago White Sox off White Sox pitcher Mike Vasil in the second game of a doubleheader. He became the sixth active player to reach 350 home runs and become the 7th player to hit 350 home runs while also earning at least 10 Gold Gloves, joining Johnny Bench, Mike Schmidt, Willie Mays, Ken Griffey Jr., Andruw Jones, and Al Kaline. Arenado made 107 total appearances for St. Louis during the regular season, slashing .237/.289/.377 with 12 home runs and 52 RBI.

=== Arizona Diamondbacks (2026–present) ===
On January 13, 2026, the Arizona Diamondbacks acquired Arenado from the Cardinals along with $31 million for RHP Jack Martinez, who was an 8th round draft pick in the 2025 MLB draft. Against the Athletics on July 20, he recorded his 2,000th career hit against Jeffrey Springs.

== International career ==
Arenado played for the Team USA in the 2017 World Baseball Classic. On March 22, 2017, Team USA defeated the previously undefeated Puerto Rico 8–0 to capture their first-ever World Baseball Classic championship.

Arenado returned to Team USA for the 2023 World Baseball Classic, posting a .385 batting average and a 1.025 OPS through the tournament as the team's starting third baseman. Team USA reached the finals for the second consecutive WBC but fell to Japan by a score of 3–2, finishing as the tournament's runner-up.

In 2026, Arenado played for Puerto Rico in the 2026 World Baseball Classic. He was eligible to play for them as his mother has Puerto Rican ancestry.

== Player profile ==
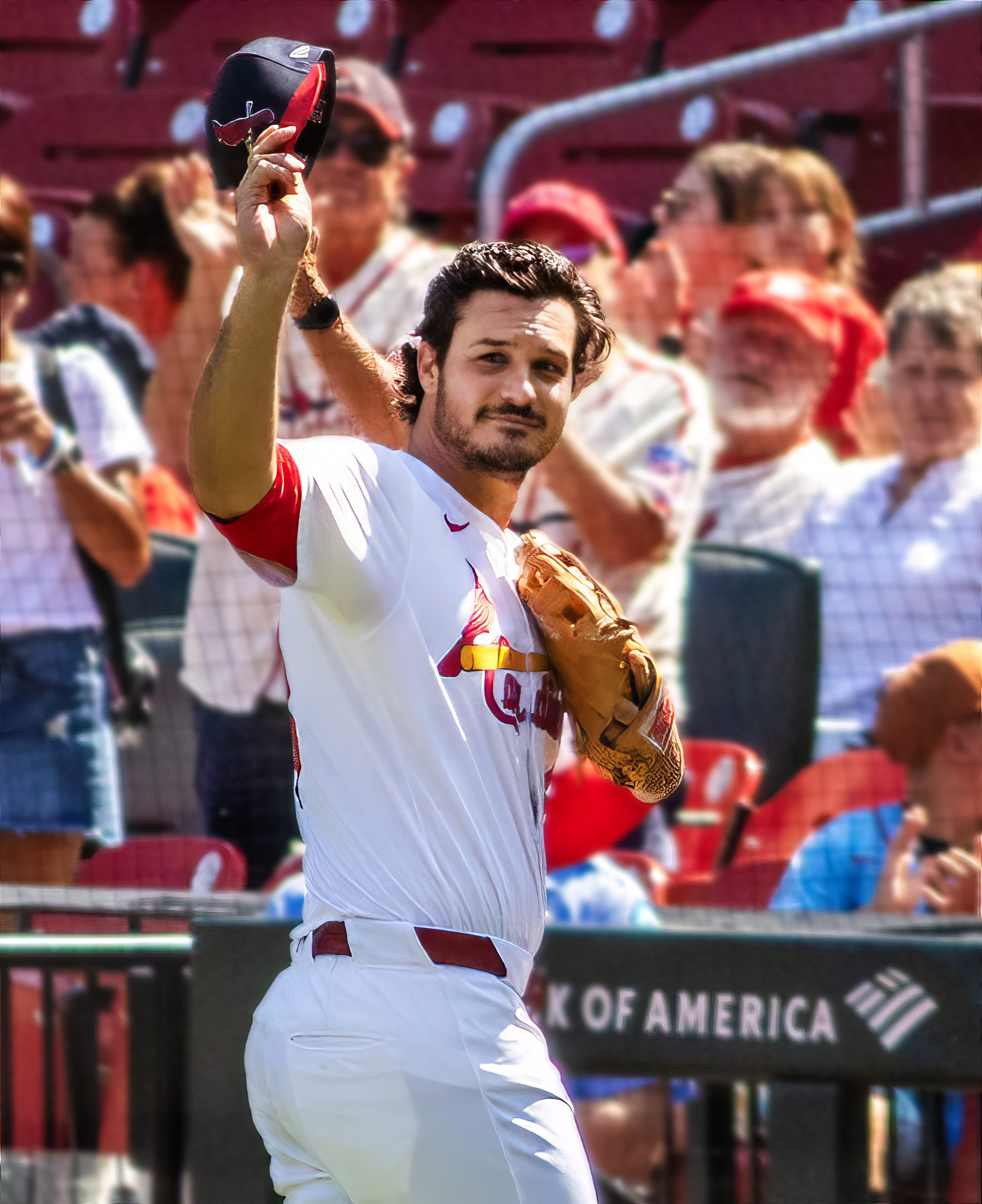
Arenado bids farewell to his years with the Cardinals on September 21, 2025.

Arenado is exceptionally skilled in range, catching, and throwing, including arm strength and accuracy, even while throwing off-balance. Remarked Denver Post beat writer Patrick Saunders, "In every city I travel, writers, broadcasters, and fans rave about Arenado's magic at the hot corner."

Arenado is known to practice intensely and often. When Rockies manager Bud Black visited him at the campus of University of California, Irvine, in January 2017, Arenado asked to take ground balls at third base. Black marveled, "Very few big leaguers take grounders in January, because here comes February and March, and you're gonna take thousands of them."

He wears an oversized glove to give him more margin for error.

== Awards and accomplishments ==
Awards received
Name of award	Times	Dates	Ref
All-Star Futures Game selection	2	2011, 2012	
Arizona Fall League Joe Black Most Valuable Player Award	1	2011	
Colorado Sports Hall of Fame Professional Athlete of the Year	1	2015	
Fielding Bible Award at third base	4	2015–2017, 2020	
Major League Baseball All-Star selection	6	2015–2019, 2021	
Major League Baseball Player of the Month	2	September 2015, July 2017	
Major League Baseball Player of the Week	6	2014 Aug. 24th, 2015 Jun. 28th, 2016 Apr. 18th, 2017 Jul. 24th, 2018 Jun. 24th, 2019 May 26	
Players Choice Award for Majestic Athletic Always Game Award	1	2017	
Rawlings Gold Glove Award at third base	10	2013–2022	
Rawlings Platinum Glove for the National League	6	2017–2022	
Silver Slugger Award at third base	5	2015–2018, 2022	
Wilson Defensive Player of the Year at third base	3	2015–2017	

Records and distinctions

- Colorado Rockies' franchise hit streak record of 28 games (May 28, 2014)
- Colorado Rockies' franchise record of home runs in six consecutive games (Sep. 1–5, 2015)
- Colorado Rockies' franchise record of youngest player to reach 100 home runs (at 25 years, 3 months, 23 days on August 8, 2016)
- Major League Baseball's first rookie to win Gold Glove at third base (2013) since 1957
- First third baseman in Major League Baseball history to win Gold Glove in each of his first five seasons, six seasons, seven seasons, eight seasons, nine seasons, and ten seasons
- Major League Baseball record of 89 extra-base hits in one season by a third baseman (2015)

Statistical achievements

Annual league statistical leader
Category	League	Times	Dates
Batting
At bats per strikeout	National League	1	2020
Doubles	National League	1	2017
Extra base hits	National League	1	2015
Games played	National League	1	2016
Home runs	National League	3	2015, 2016, 2018
Runs batted in	Minor League Baseball	1	2011
Runs batted in	National League	2	2015, 2016
Sacrifice flies	National League	1	2015
Total bases	National League	2	2015, 2016
Fielding as third baseman
Assists	National League	5	2015–2019
Defensive games	National League	4	2015–2018
Double plays turned	National League	7	2015–2021
Putouts	National League	5	2015, 2017–2019, 2021
Range factor/game	National League	9	2013–2021
Note: Per Baseball-Reference.com.

== Personal life ==
Arenado married his high school sweetheart, Laura Kwan, in December 2019. Their first child, a daughter, was born in August 2022.

Arenado's favorite players are Hall of Fame third basemen Adrián Beltré and former Rockies teammate and outfielder Matt Holliday. Arenado apprised that he attempts to mimic Holliday's swing "because he stayed through the ball so much."

Longtime Dodgers play-by-play announcer Vin Scully autographed the bat with which Arenado hit his 40th home run of 2016, during Scully's last season of broadcasting, and his final series of calling Dodgers' home games.

Josh Fuentes, Arenado's cousin, has played as a third baseman for the Colorado Rockies.

Formerly, Arenado's agent was Scott Boras. As of November 2015, it was reported as Joel Wolfe of Wasserman Media Group.

Arenado is a Christian. He has a tattoo on his left forearm that says Matthew 19:26.

Arenado has a street named after him in his hometown of Lake Forest, California.

== See also ==
- Colorado Rockies individual awards
- List of Major League Baseball annual doubles leaders
- List of Major League Baseball career assists as a third baseman leaders
- List of Major League Baseball career games played as a third baseman leaders
- List of Major League Baseball career home run leaders
- List of Major League Baseball career runs batted in leaders
- List of Major League Baseball career runs scored leaders
- List of Major League Baseball career hits leaders
- List of Major League Baseball career slugging percentage leaders
- List of Major League Baseball players to hit for the cycle
- List of people from Newport Beach, California
- St. Louis Cardinals award winners and league leaders

== Notes ==
Awards and achievements
Preceded by Carlos Gómez; Austin Hays	Hitting for the cycle June 18, 2017; July 1, 2022	Succeeded by Cody Bellinger; Luis Arráez
Preceded by Andrew McCutchen; Andrew McCutchen; Tyler O'Neill; Austin Riley	National League Player of the Month; September 2015; July 2017; April 2022; August 2022	Succeeded by Bryce Harper; Giancarlo Stanton; Paul Goldschmidt; Eduardo Escobar
