= List of Gold Glove Award winners at third base =

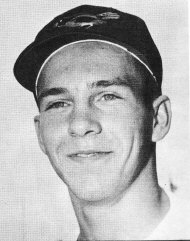
Brooks Robinson won 16 Gold Gloves, leading all third basemen, and is tied for the second-highest win total in the history of the award.

The Gold Glove Award is the award given annually to the Major League Baseball players judged to have exhibited superior individual fielding performances at each fielding position in both the National League (NL) and the American League (AL), as voted by the managers and coaches in each league. Managers are not permitted to vote for their own players. Eighteen Gold Gloves are awarded each year (with the exception of 1957, 1985, 2007 and 2018), one at each of the nine positions in each league. In 1957, the baseball glove manufacturer Rawlings created the Gold Glove Award to commemorate the best fielding performance at each position. The award was created from a glove made from gold lamé-tanned leather and affixed to a walnut base. Initially, only one Gold Glove per position was awarded to the top fielder at each position in the entire league; however, separate awards were given for the National and American Leagues beginning in 1958.

Brooks Robinson won 16 Gold Gloves with the Baltimore Orioles, leading both the American League and all third basemen in awards won. Mike Schmidt is tied with Nolan Arenado for second in wins at third base; Schmidt won 10 with the Philadelphia Phillies and is tied for National League third basemen in Gold Gloves. Arenado also has 10, 8 with the Rockies and 2 with the Cardinals. Scott Rolen owns the fourth-highest total, winning eight awards. Rolen won with the Phillies, the St. Louis Cardinals, and the Cincinnati Reds. Six-time winners at third base are Buddy Bell, Eric Chavez, and Robin Ventura. Adrián Beltré, Ken Boyer, Matt Chapman, Doug Rader, and Ron Santo have each won five Gold Gloves at third base, and four-time winners include Gary Gaetti and Matt Williams. Hall of Famers who have won a Gold Glove at the position include Robinson, Rolen, Schmidt, Santo, Wade Boggs, and George Brett.

The fewest errors committed in a third baseman's winning season is zero, achieved by Isiah Kiner-Falefa in the pandemic-shortened 2020 season. Kiner-Falefa also leads all winners with a 1.000 fielding percentage. Arenado led all National League winners with three errors, also in the 2020 season, while also leading the league among winners in double plays turned with 44 in 2018. Ke'Bryan Hayes leads National League winners in fielding percentage with .984 in 2023. Robinson leads all winners with 410 assists in 1974, and made the most putouts in the American League (174 in 1966). The most putouts by a winner was 187, made by Santo in 1967. Schmidt leads the National League in assists, with 396 in 1977. The most double plays turned in a season was 46 by Evan Longoria in 2010.

Ken Boyer and Clete Boyer are the only pair of brothers to have won Gold Glove Awards at third base. Older brother Ken won five Gold Gloves in six years with the Cardinals (1958–1961, 1963), and Clete won in 1969 with the Atlanta Braves.

== Key ==
Year	Links to the corresponding Major League Baseball season
PO	Putout
A	Assist
E	Error
DP	Double play
FPct	Fielding percentage
* or **	Winner of the most Gold Glove Awards at his position (** indicates tie)
†	Member of the National Baseball Hall of Fame and Museum

== American League winners ==
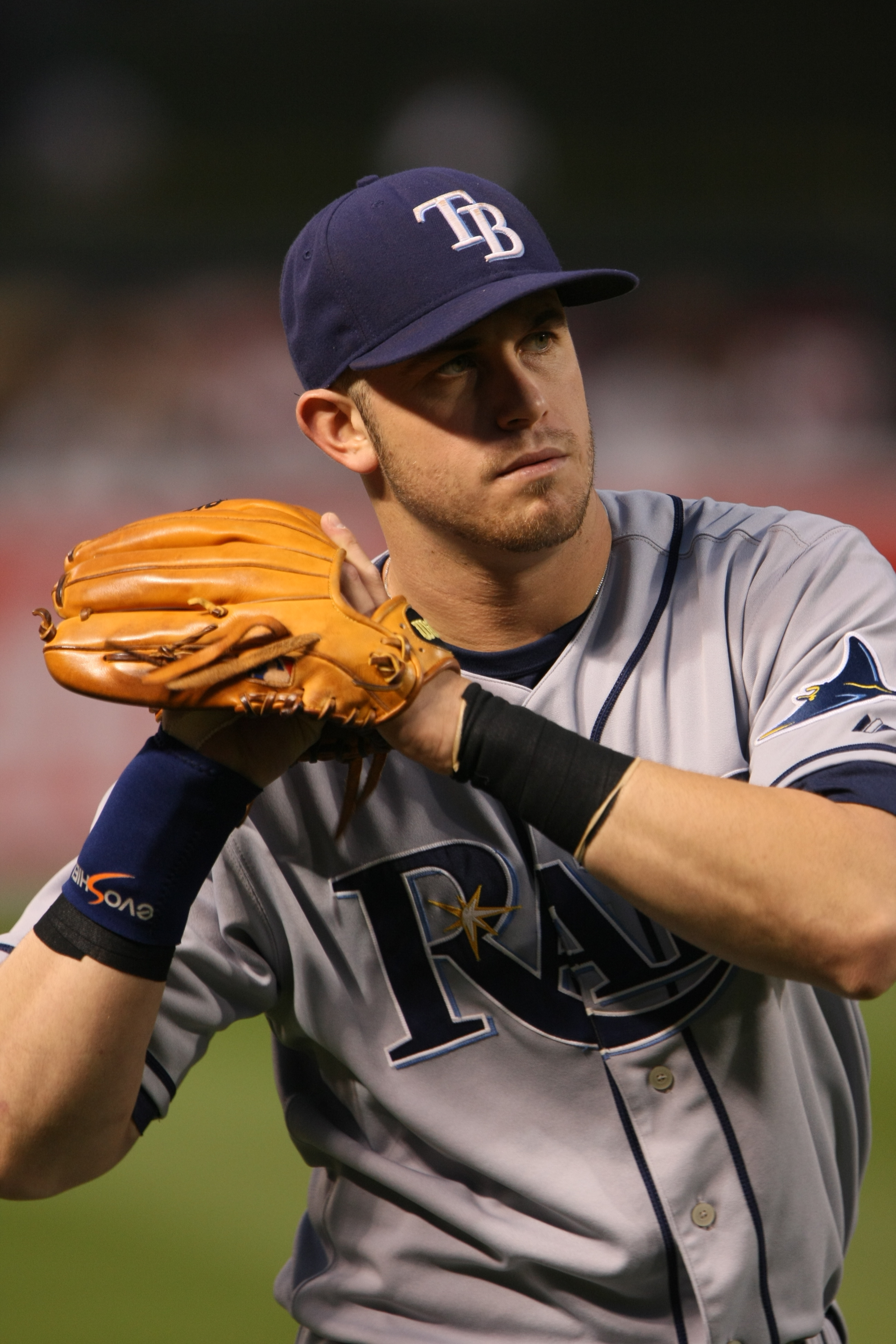
Evan Longoria (2009–2010 AL Gold Glove winner)

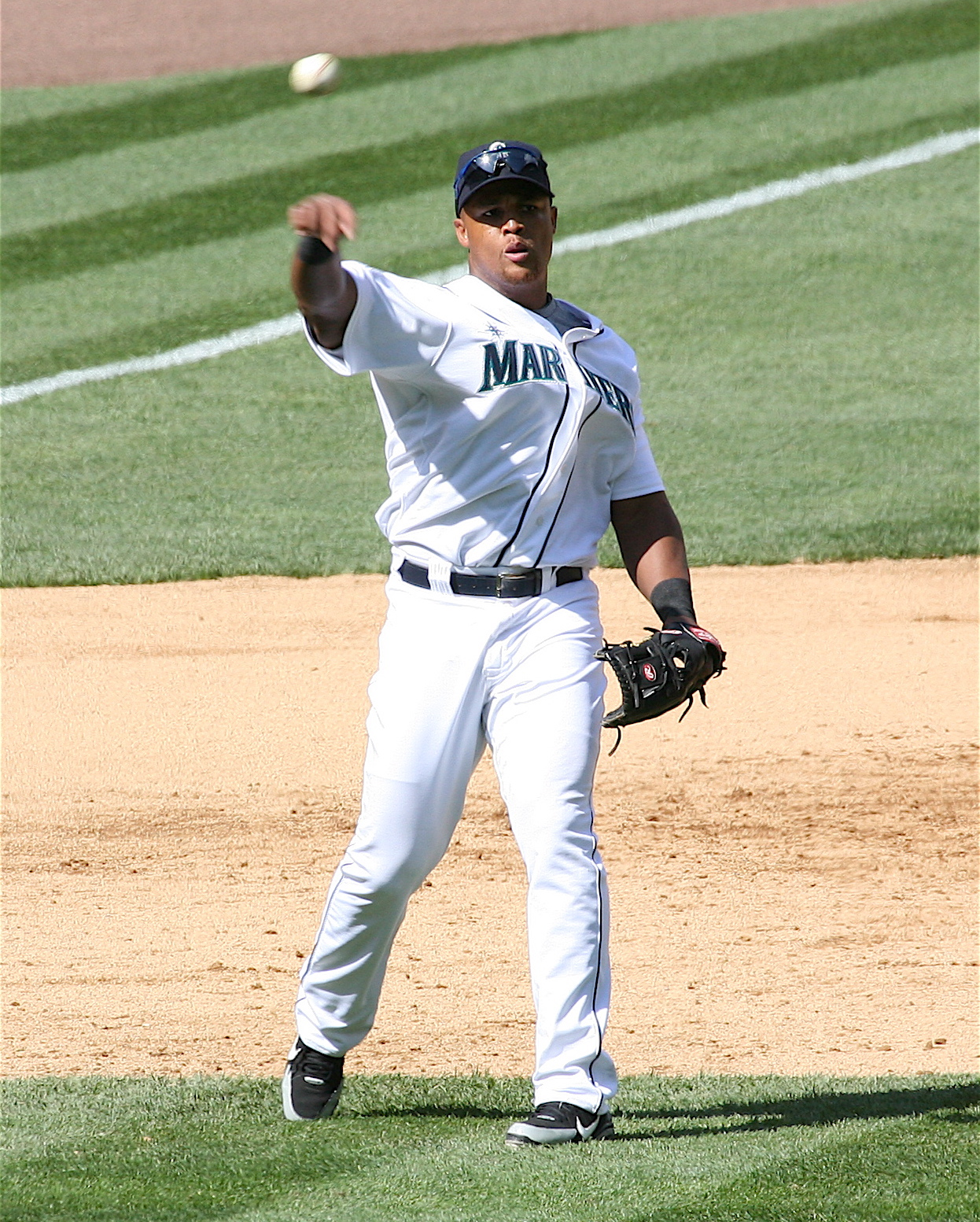
Adrián Beltré (2007–2008, 2011-2012 AL Gold Glove winner)

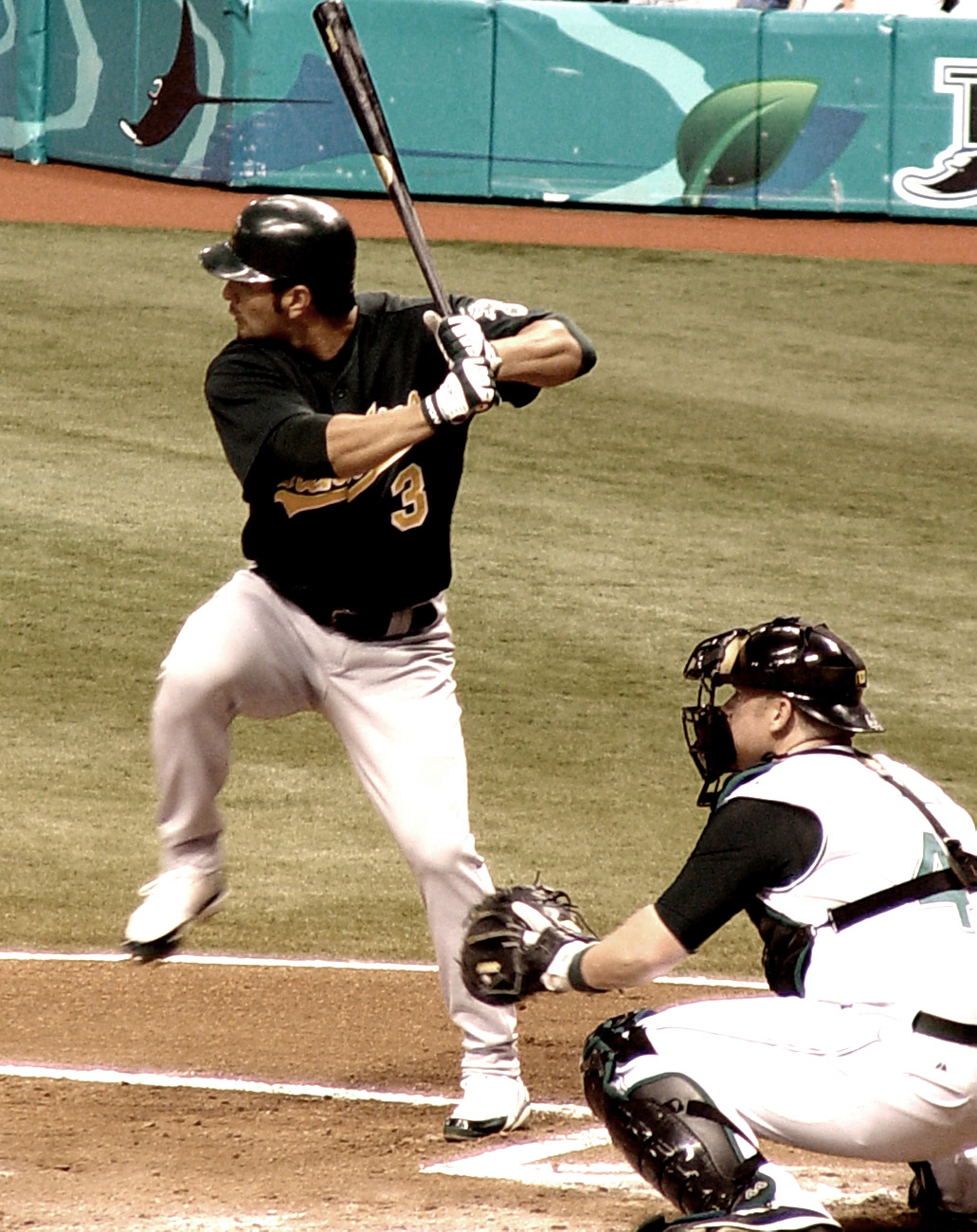
Eric Chavez (2001–2006 AL Gold Glove winner)

Year	Player	Team	PO	A	E	DP	FPct	Ref
1957^{[a]}	Frank Malzone	Boston Red Sox	151	370	25	31	.954	
1958	Frank Malzone	Boston Red Sox	139	378	27	36	.950	
1959	Frank Malzone	Boston Red Sox	134	357	24	40	.953	
1960	Brooks Robinson*^{†}	Baltimore Orioles	171	328	12	34	.977	
1961	Brooks Robinson*^{†}	Baltimore Orioles	151	331	14	34	.972	
1962	Brooks Robinson*^{†}	Baltimore Orioles	163	339	11	32	.979	
1963	Brooks Robinson*^{†}	Baltimore Orioles	153	330	12	43	.976	
1964	Brooks Robinson*^{†}	Baltimore Orioles	153	327	14	40	.972	
1965	Brooks Robinson*^{†}	Baltimore Orioles	144	296	15	36	.967	
1966	Brooks Robinson*^{†}	Baltimore Orioles	174	313	12	26	.976	
1967	Brooks Robinson*^{†}	Baltimore Orioles	147	405	11	37	.980	
1968	Brooks Robinson*^{†}	Baltimore Orioles	168	353	16	31	.970	
1969	Brooks Robinson*^{†}	Baltimore Orioles	163	370	13	37	.976	
1970	Brooks Robinson*^{†}	Baltimore Orioles	157	321	17	30	.966	
1971	Brooks Robinson*^{†}	Baltimore Orioles	131	354	16	35	.968	
1972	Brooks Robinson*^{†}	Baltimore Orioles	129	333	11	27	.977	
1973	Brooks Robinson*^{†}	Baltimore Orioles	129	354	15	25	.970	
1974	Brooks Robinson*^{†}	Baltimore Orioles	115	410	18	44	.967	
1975	Brooks Robinson*^{†}	Baltimore Orioles	96	326	9	30	.979	
1976	Aurelio Rodríguez	Detroit Tigers	120	280	9	21	.978	
1977	Graig Nettles	New York Yankees	132	321	12	31	.974	
1978	Graig Nettles	New York Yankees	109	326	11	30	.975	
1979	Buddy Bell	Texas Rangers	112	364	15	22	.969	
1980	Buddy Bell	Texas Rangers	123	282	8	26	.981	
1981	Buddy Bell	Texas Rangers	66	281	14	18	.961	
1982	Buddy Bell	Texas Rangers	131	396	13	35	.976	
1983	Buddy Bell	Texas Rangers	123	383	17	29	.967	
1984	Buddy Bell	Texas Rangers	129	323	20	28	.958	
1985	George Brett^{†}	Kansas City Royals	107	339	15	33	.967	
1986	Gary Gaetti	Minnesota Twins	118	334	21	36	.956	
1987	Gary Gaetti	Minnesota Twins	134	261	11	28	.973	
1988	Gary Gaetti	Minnesota Twins	105	189	7	24	.977	
1989	Gary Gaetti	Minnesota Twins	104	251	10	23	.973	
1990	Kelly Gruber	Toronto Blue Jays	123	280	19	21	.955	
1991	Robin Ventura	Chicago White Sox	134	287	18	29	.959	
1992	Robin Ventura	Chicago White Sox	141	372	23	29	.957	
1993	Robin Ventura	Chicago White Sox	112	278	14	26	.965	
1994	Wade Boggs^{†}	New York Yankees	40	214	10	19	.962	
1995	Wade Boggs^{†}	New York Yankees	69	193	5	11	.981	
1996	Robin Ventura	Chicago White Sox	133	239	10	34	.974	
1997	Matt Williams	Cleveland Indians	88	299	12	21	.970	
1998	Robin Ventura	Chicago White Sox	102	330	15	38	.966	
1999	Scott Brosius	New York Yankees	87	239	13	20	.962	
2000	Travis Fryman	Cleveland Indians	79	276	8	20	.978	
2001	Eric Chavez	Oakland Athletics	100	321	12	27	.972	
2002	Eric Chavez	Oakland Athletics	120	301	17	24	.961	
2003	Eric Chavez	Oakland Athletics	125	343	14	33	.971	
2004	Eric Chavez	Oakland Athletics	113	276	13	31	.968	
2005	Eric Chavez	Oakland Athletics	121	301	15	27	.966	
2006	Eric Chavez	Oakland Athletics	105	281	5	42	.987	
2007	Adrián Beltré^{†}	Seattle Mariners	121	287	18	24	.958	
2008	Adrián Beltré^{†}	Seattle Mariners	100	272	14	27	.964	
2009	Evan Longoria	Tampa Bay Rays	112	302	13	43	.970	
2010	Evan Longoria	Tampa Bay Rays	127	276	14	46	.966	
2011	Adrián Beltré^{†}	Texas Rangers	93	208	11	24	.965	
2012	Adrián Beltré^{†}	Texas Rangers	95	209	8	23	.974	
2013	Manny Machado	Baltimore Orioles	116	355	13	42	.973	
2014	Kyle Seager	Seattle Mariners	87	327	8	36	.981	
2015	Manny Machado	Baltimore Orioles	132	337	19	38	.961	
2016	Adrián Beltré^{†}	Texas Rangers	104	301	10	43	.976	
2017	Evan Longoria	Tampa Bay Rays	96	267	12	33	.968	
2018	Matt Chapman	Oakland Athletics	133	331	20	37	.959	
2019	Matt Chapman	Oakland Athletics	146	311	9	27	.981	
2020	Isiah Kiner-Falefa	Texas Rangers	12	31	0	6	1.000	
2021	Matt Chapman	Oakland Athletics	166	274	6	40	.987	
2022	Ramón Urías	Baltimore Orioles	54	197	8	25	.969	
2023	Matt Chapman	Toronto Blue Jays	114	253	12	35	.968	
2024	Alex Bregman	Houston Astros	103	242	10	23	.972	
2025	Maikel Garcia	Kansas City Royals	105	234	7	24	.980	
2026	Caleb Durbin	Boston Red Sox	95	282	11	31	.972	

== National League winners ==
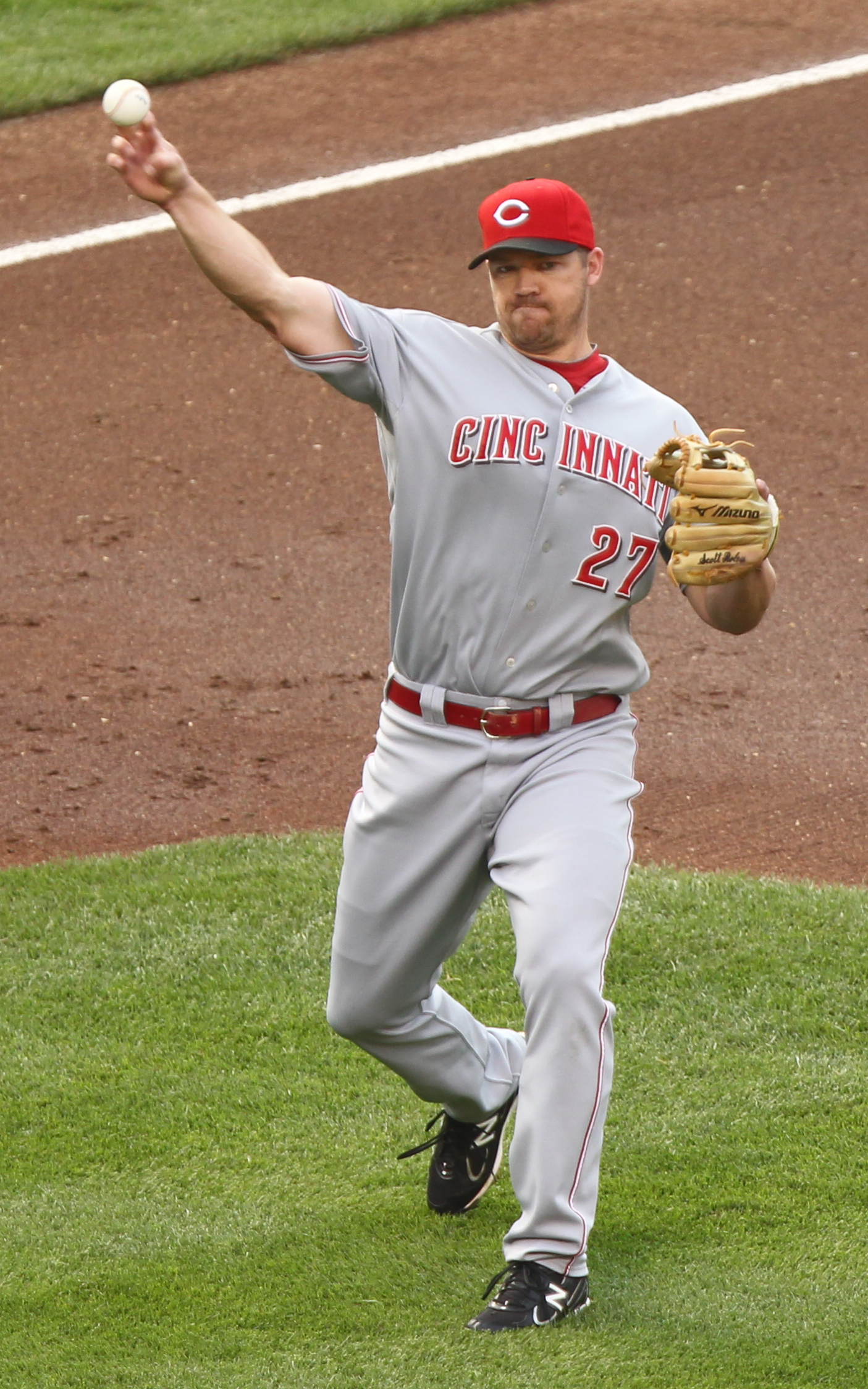
Scott Rolen (1998, 2000–2004, 2006, 2010 NL Gold Glove winner)

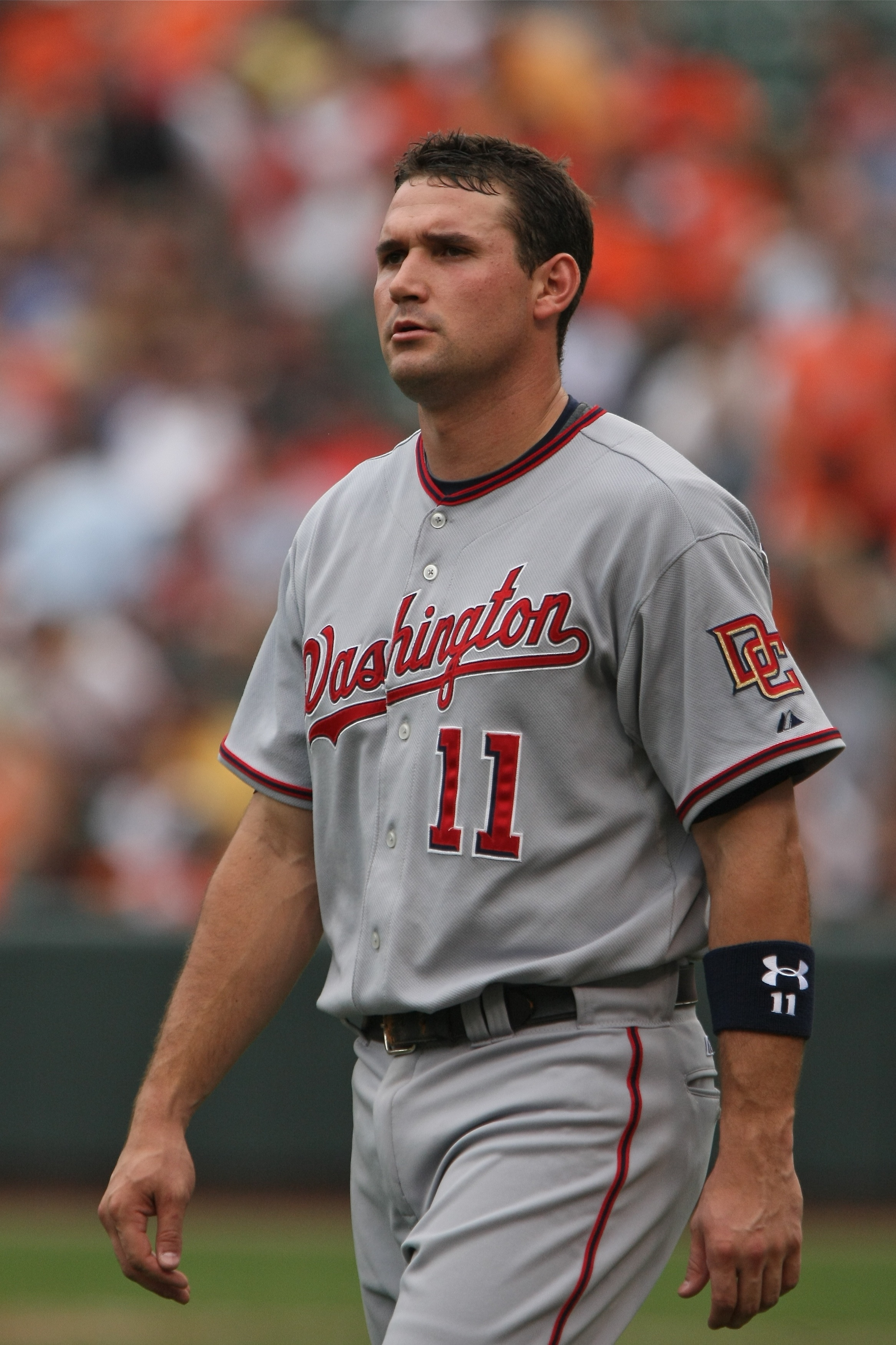
Ryan Zimmerman (2009 NL Gold Glove winner)

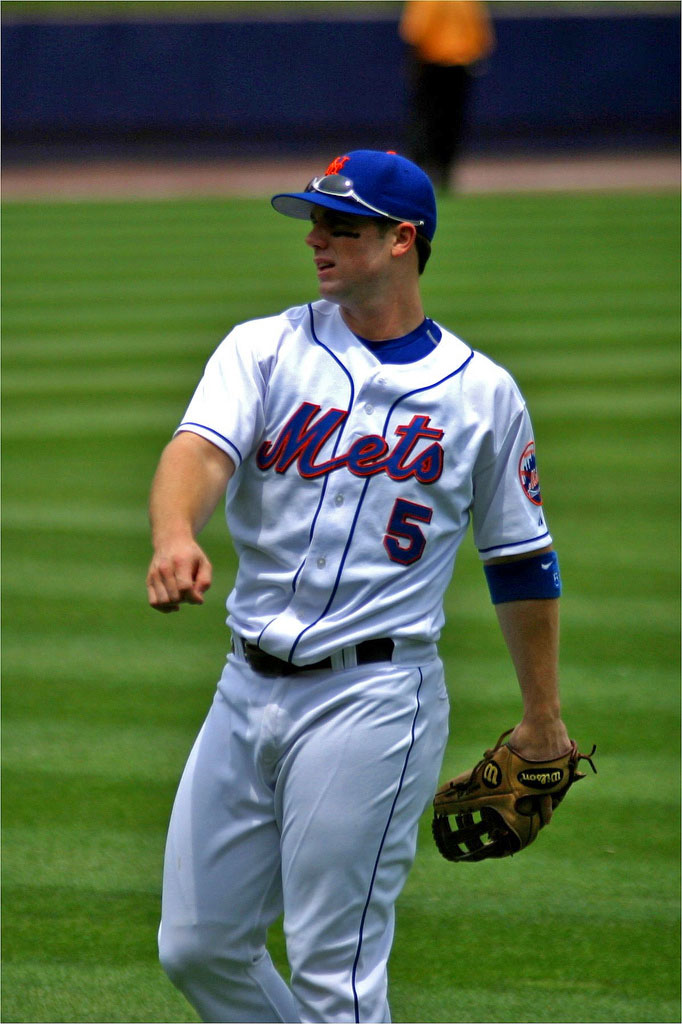
David Wright (2007–2008 NL Gold Glove winner)

Year	Player	Team	PO	A	E	DP	FPct	Ref
1957^{[b]}	Frank Malzone	Boston Red Sox (AL)	151	370	25	31	.954	
1958	Ken Boyer	St. Louis Cardinals	156	350	20	41	.962	
1959	Ken Boyer	St. Louis Cardinals	134	300	20	32	.956	
1960	Ken Boyer	St. Louis Cardinals	140	300	19	37	.959	
1961	Ken Boyer	St. Louis Cardinals	117	346	24	23	.951	
1962	Jim Davenport	San Francisco Giants	125	256	19	28	.953	
1963	Ken Boyer	St. Louis Cardinals	129	293	34	23	.925	
1964	Ron Santo^{†}	Chicago Cubs	156	367	20	31	.963	
1965	Ron Santo^{†}	Chicago Cubs	155	373	24	27	.957	
1966	Ron Santo^{†}	Chicago Cubs	150	391	25	36	.956	
1967	Ron Santo^{†}	Chicago Cubs	187	393	26	33	.957	
1968	Ron Santo^{†}	Chicago Cubs	130	378	15	33	.971	
1969	Clete Boyer	Atlanta Braves	139	275	15	18	.965	
1970	Doug Rader	Houston Astros	147	357	18	39	.966	
1971	Doug Rader	Houston Astros	93	275	21	28	.946	
1972	Doug Rader	Houston Astros	119	340	20	31	.958	
1973	Doug Rader	Houston Astros	134	296	25	24	.945	
1974	Doug Rader	Houston Astros	128	347	17	28	.965	
1975	Ken Reitz	St. Louis Cardinals	124	279	23	21	.946	
1976	Mike Schmidt^{†}	Philadelphia Phillies	139	377	21	29	.961	
1977	Mike Schmidt^{†}	Philadelphia Phillies	106	396	19	33	.964	
1978	Mike Schmidt^{†}	Philadelphia Phillies	98	324	16	34	.963	
1979	Mike Schmidt^{†}	Philadelphia Phillies	114	361	23	36	.954	
1980	Mike Schmidt^{†}	Philadelphia Phillies	98	372	27	31	.946	
1981	Mike Schmidt^{†}	Philadelphia Phillies	74	249	15	20	.956	
1982	Mike Schmidt^{†}	Philadelphia Phillies	110	324	23	28	.950	
1983	Mike Schmidt^{†}	Philadelphia Phillies	107	332	19	29	.959	
1984	Mike Schmidt^{†}	Philadelphia Phillies	85	329	26	19	.941	
1985	Tim Wallach	Montreal Expos	148	383	18	34	.967	
1986	Mike Schmidt^{†}	Philadelphia Phillies	78	220	6	27	.980	
1987	Terry Pendleton	St. Louis Cardinals	117	369	26	27	.949	
1988	Tim Wallach	Montreal Expos	123	328	18	31	.962	
1989	Terry Pendleton	St. Louis Cardinals	113	392	15	25	.971	
1990	Tim Wallach	Montreal Expos	128	309	21	23	.954	
1991	Matt Williams	San Francisco Giants	131	293	16	30	.964	
1992	Terry Pendleton	Atlanta Braves	133	325	19	27	.960	
1993	Matt Williams	San Francisco Giants	117	266	12	34	.970	
1994	Matt Williams	San Francisco Giants	79	235	12	22	.963	
1995	Ken Caminiti	San Diego Padres	102	295	27	28	.936	
1996	Ken Caminiti	San Diego Padres	103	310	20	28	.954	
1997	Ken Caminiti	San Diego Padres	90	291	24	20	.941	
1998	Scott Rolen^{†}	Philadelphia Phillies	135	319	14	28	.970	
1999	Robin Ventura	New York Mets	123	320	9	33	.980	
2000	Scott Rolen^{†}	Philadelphia Phillies	89	245	10	14	.971	
2001	Scott Rolen^{†}	Philadelphia Phillies	104	325	12	22	.973	
2002	Scott Rolen^{†}	Philadelphia Phillies; St. Louis Cardinals	133	335	16	41	.967	
2003	Scott Rolen^{†}	St. Louis Cardinals	109	298	13	23	.969	
2004	Scott Rolen^{†}	St. Louis Cardinals	93	325	10	23	.977	
2005	Mike Lowell	Florida Marlins	107	243	6	34	.983	
2006	Scott Rolen^{†}	St. Louis Cardinals	93	318	15	32	.965	
2007	David Wright	New York Mets	107	324	21	24	.954	
2008	David Wright	New York Mets	114	286	16	21	.962	
2009	Ryan Zimmerman	Washington Nationals	117	325	17	28	.963	
2010	Scott Rolen^{†}	Cincinnati Reds	83	259	8	28	.977	
2011	Plácido Polanco	Philadelphia Phillies	79	259	8	15	.977	
2012	Chase Headley	San Diego Padres	100	315	10	20	.976	
2013	Nolan Arenado	Colorado Rockies	91	309	11	27	.973	
2014	Nolan Arenado	Colorado Rockies	69	280	15	31	.959	
2015	Nolan Arenado	Colorado Rockies	105	385	17	42	.966	
2016	Nolan Arenado	Colorado Rockies	99	378	13	39	.973	
2017	Nolan Arenado	Colorado Rockies	103	311	9	39	.979	
2018	Nolan Arenado	Colorado Rockies	104	312	14	44	.967	
2019	Nolan Arenado	Colorado Rockies	111	337	9	43	.980	
2020	Nolan Arenado	Colorado Rockies	43	117	3	19	.982	
2021	Nolan Arenado	St. Louis Cardinals	125	287	11	38	.974	
2022	Nolan Arenado	St. Louis Cardinals	84	283	12	42	.968	
2023	Ke'Bryan Hayes	Pittsburgh Pirates	93	266	6	33	.984	
2024	Matt Chapman	San Francisco Giants	100	290	15	34	.963	
2025	Ke'Bryan Hayes	Pittsburgh Pirates; Cincinnati Reds	100	291	5	26	.987	
2026	Alex Bregman	Chicago Cubs	78	251	6	30	.982	

== Footnotes ==
- ^{a} ^{b} In 1957, Gold Gloves were given to the top fielders in Major League Baseball, instead of separate awards for the National and American Leagues; therefore, the winners are the same in each table.
