= List of Silver Slugger Award winners at third base =

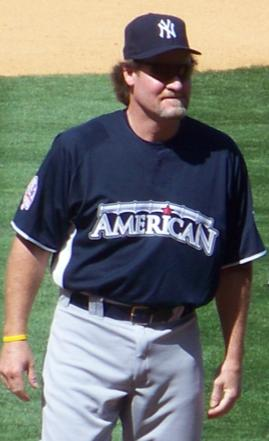
Wade Boggs has won the most Silver Slugger Awards among third basemen.

The Silver Slugger Award is awarded annually to the best offensive player at each position in both the American League (AL) and the National League (NL), as determined by the coaches and managers of Major League Baseball (MLB). These voters consider several offensive categories in selecting the winners, including batting average, slugging percentage, and on-base percentage, in addition to "coaches' and managers' general impressions of a player's overall offensive value". Managers and coaches are not permitted to vote for players on their own team. The Silver Slugger was first awarded in 1980 and is given by Hillerich & Bradsby, the manufacturer of Louisville Slugger bats. The award is a bat-shaped trophy, 3 feet (91 cm) tall, engraved with the names of each of the winners from the league and plated with sterling silver.

Among third basemen, Wade Boggs has won the most Silver Slugger Awards, winning eight times with the rival Boston Red Sox (six) and New York Yankees (two). In the National League, Mike Schmidt leads with six wins; Schmidt won the first five National League Silver Slugger Awards at third base from 1980, when he led the Philadelphia Phillies to the World Series, until 1984 when his streak was broken by Tim Wallach. Nolan Arenado collected four National League Silver Sluggers at third base with the Colorado Rockies from 2015 to 2018, and a fifth with the St. Louis Cardinals in 2022. José Ramírez also collected six Silver Sluggers at third baseman, all with the Cleveland Indians/Guardians franchise (2017–2018, 2020, 2022, 2024–2025). Adrián Beltré and Matt Williams each won four Silver Slugger Awards; Beltre won one with the National League's Los Angeles Dodgers (2004) and three with the American League's Boston Red Sox (2010) and Texas Rangers (2011; 2014), and Williams won three National League awards with the San Francisco Giants (1990; 1993–1994) and one American League award with the Cleveland Indians (1997). Yankees third baseman Alex Rodriguez has won three American League Silver Sluggers at the position, and has ten wins in his career as he accumulated seven wins at shortstop with the Seattle Mariners and Texas Rangers. Miguel Cabrera won three Silver Slugger Awards at third base with the National League's Florida Marlins (2006) and American League's Detroit Tigers (2012–2013), to go along with three first base Silver Slugger Awards with the Tigers. In the National League, Vinny Castilla won three awards in four years for the Colorado Rockies (1995, 1997–1998). Manny Machado also won three awards, all with the San Diego Padres (2020, 2024–2025). Junior Caminero and Alex Bregman are the most recent winners.

George Brett hit .390 for the Kansas City Royals in the award's inaugural season, the highest average by a third baseman in the Silver Slugger era. Cabrera holds the National League batting average record for a third baseman (.339 in 2006). However, overall leader Boggs accumulated five winning seasons with a higher batting average than Cabrera's record. Boggs holds the record for the highest on-base percentage in a third baseman's winning season, with .476 in 1988; Chipper Jones' National League record is .441, achieved in 1999. Brett also holds the record for highest slugging percentage (.664 in 1980), followed by National League record-holder Schmidt (.644 in 1981). Schmidt's 48 home runs are tied with Beltré for most in the National League during an award-winning season. Despite this, Rodriguez holds the Major League record, with 54 home runs in 2007. Rodriguez batted in 156 runs during the 2007 season; the National League record is held by Castilla (144 runs batted in during 1998).

== Key ==
Year	Links to the corresponding Major League Baseball season
AVG	Batting average
OBP	On-base percentage
SLG	Slugging percentage
HR	Home runs
RBI	Runs batted in
Ref	References
*	Winner of the most Silver Sluggers in Major League Baseball as a third baseman
†	Member of the National Baseball Hall of Fame and Museum

== American League winners ==
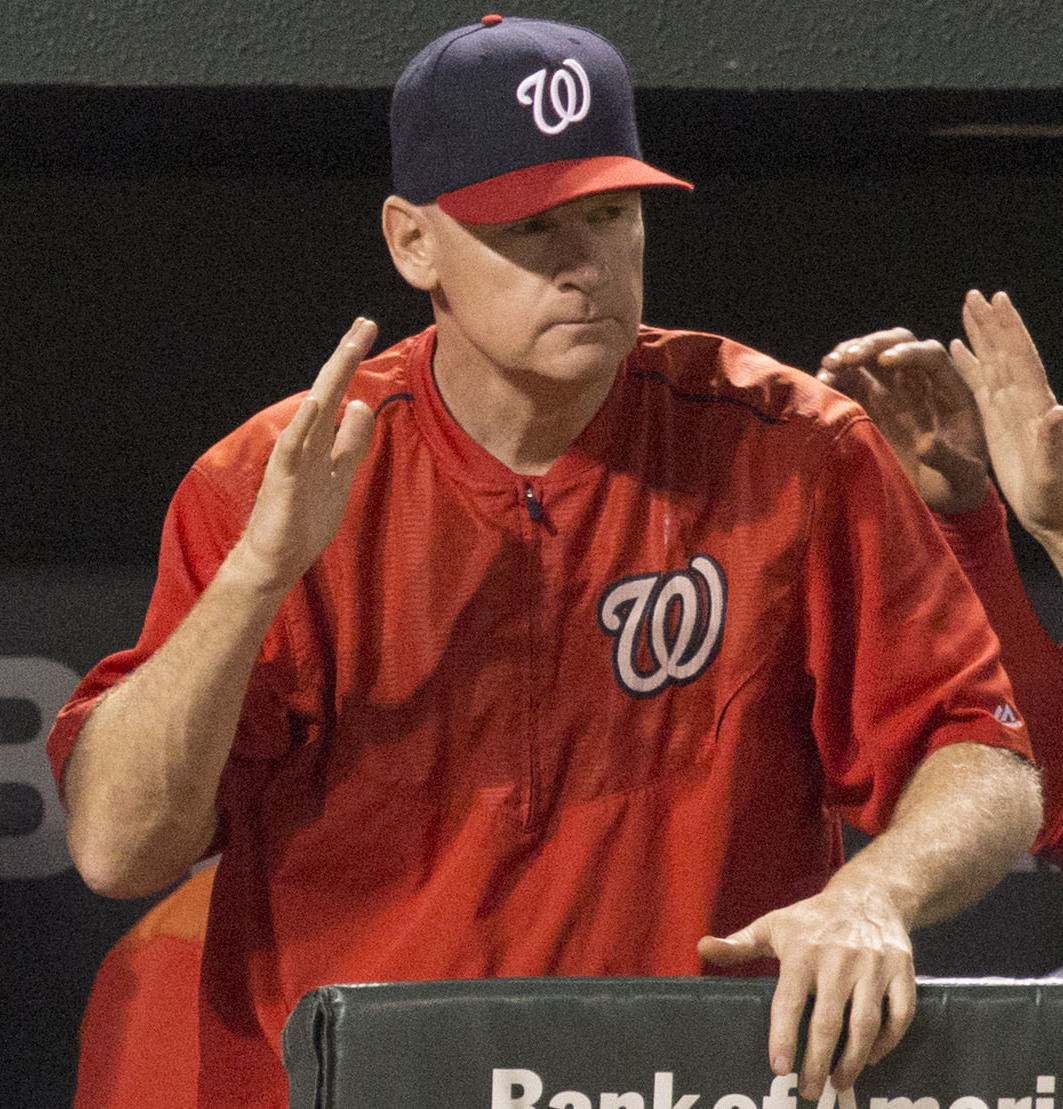
In 1997, Matt Williams became the first player to win the Silver Slugger Award at third base in both leagues.

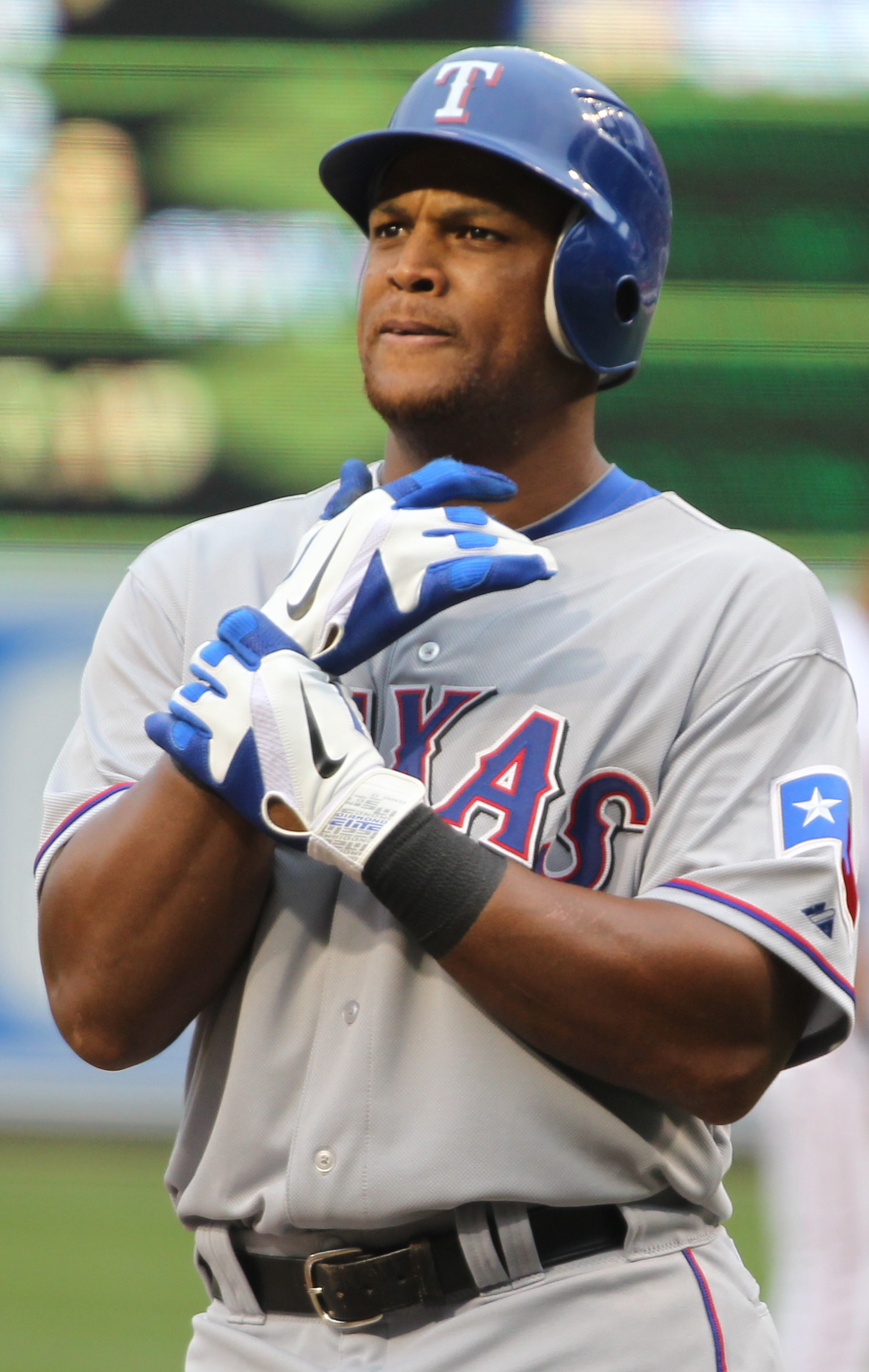
Adrián Beltré went six seasons between Silver Slugger Awards at third base (2004–2010), the longest such gap.

Year	Player	Team	AVG	OBP	SLG	HR	RBI	Ref
1980	George Brett^{†}	Kansas City Royals	.390	.454	.664	24	118	
1981	Carney Lansford	Boston Red Sox	.336	.389	.439	4	52	
1982	Doug DeCinces	California Angels	.301	.369	.548	30	97	
1983	Wade Boggs*^{†}	Boston Red Sox	.361	.444	.486	5	74	
1984	Buddy Bell	Texas Rangers	.315	.382	.458	11	83	
1985	George Brett^{†} (2)	Kansas City Royals	.335	.436	.585	30	112	
1986	Wade Boggs*^{†} (2)	Boston Red Sox	.357	.453	.486	8	71	
1987	Wade Boggs*^{†} (3)	Boston Red Sox	.363	.461	.588	24	89	
1988	Wade Boggs*^{†} (4)	Boston Red Sox	.366	.476	.490	5	58	
1989	Wade Boggs*^{†} (5)	Boston Red Sox	.330	.430	.449	3	54	
1990	Kelly Gruber	Toronto Blue Jays	.274	.330	.512	31	118	
1991	Wade Boggs*^{†} (6)	Boston Red Sox	.332	.421	.460	8	51	
1992	Edgar Martínez^{†}	Seattle Mariners	.343	.404	.544	18	73	
1993	Wade Boggs*^{†} (7)	New York Yankees	.302	.378	.363	2	59	
1994	Wade Boggs*^{†} (8)	New York Yankees	.342	.433	.489	11	55	
1995	Gary Gaetti	Kansas City Royals	.261	.329	.518	35	96	
1996	Jim Thome^{†}	Cleveland Indians	.311	.450	.612	38	116	
1997	Matt Williams (4)	Cleveland Indians	.263	.307	.488	32	105	
1998	Dean Palmer	Kansas City Royals	.278	.333	.510	34	119	
1999	Dean Palmer (2)	Detroit Tigers	.263	.339	.518	38	100	
2000	Troy Glaus	Anaheim Angels	.284	.404	.604	47	102	
2001	Troy Glaus (2)	Anaheim Angels	.250	.367	.531	41	108	
2002	Eric Chavez	Oakland Athletics	.275	.348	.513	34	109	
2003	Bill Mueller	Boston Red Sox	.326	.398	.540	19	85	
2004	Melvin Mora	Baltimore Orioles	.340	.419	.562	27	104	
2005	Alex Rodriguez	New York Yankees	.321	.421	.610	48	130	
2006	Joe Crede	Chicago White Sox	.283	.323	.506	30	94	
2007	Alex Rodriguez (2)	New York Yankees	.314	.422	.645	54	156	
2008	Alex Rodriguez (3)	New York Yankees	.302	.392	.573	35	103	
2009	Evan Longoria	Tampa Bay Rays	.281	.364	.526	33	113	
2010	Adrián Beltré^{†} (2)	Boston Red Sox	.321	.365	.553	28	102	
2011	Adrián Beltré^{†} (3)	Texas Rangers	.296	.331	.561	32	105	
2012	Miguel Cabrera (2)	Detroit Tigers	.330	.393	.606	44	139	
2013	Miguel Cabrera (3)	Detroit Tigers	.348	.442	.636	44	137	
2014	Adrián Beltré^{†} (4)	Texas Rangers	.324	.388	.492	19	77	
2015	Josh Donaldson	Toronto Blue Jays	.297	.371	.568	41	123	
2016	Josh Donaldson (2)	Toronto Blue Jays	.284	.404	.549	37	99	
2017	José Ramírez	Cleveland Indians	.318	.374	.583	29	83	
2018	José Ramírez (2)	Cleveland Indians	.270	.387	.552	39	105	
2019	Alex Bregman	Houston Astros	.296	.423	.592	41	112	
2020	José Ramírez (3)	Cleveland Indians	.292	.386	.607	17	46	
2021	Rafael Devers	Boston Red Sox	.279	.352	.538	38	113	
2022	José Ramírez (4)	Cleveland Guardians	.280	.355	.514	29	126	
2023	Rafael Devers (2)	Boston Red Sox	.271	.351	.500	33	100	
2024	José Ramírez (5)	Cleveland Guardians	.279	.335	.537	39	118	
2025	José Ramírez (6)	Cleveland Guardians	.283	.360	.503	30	85	
2026	Junior Caminero	Tampa Bay Rays	.276	.360	.524	42	101	

== National League winners ==
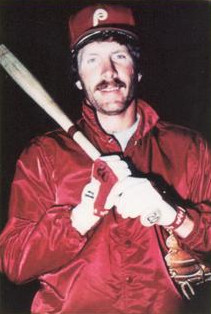
Mike Schmidt has won the most Silver Slugger Awards at third base in the National League.

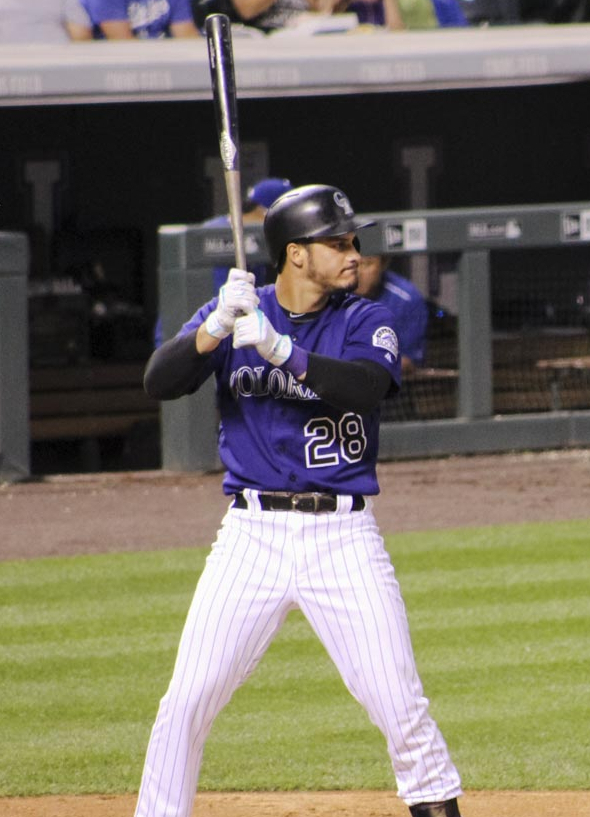
Nolan Arenado has won the second-most Silver Slugger Awards at third base in the National League.

Year	Player	Team	AVG	OBP	SLG	HR	RBI	Ref
1980	Mike Schmidt^{†}	Philadelphia Phillies	.286	.380	.624	48	121	
1981	Mike Schmidt^{†} (2)	Philadelphia Phillies	.316	.435	.644	31	91	
1982	Mike Schmidt^{†} (3)	Philadelphia Phillies	.280	.403	.547	35	87	
1983	Mike Schmidt^{†} (4)	Philadelphia Phillies	.255	.399	.524	40	109	
1984	Mike Schmidt^{†} (5)	Philadelphia Phillies	.277	.383	.536	36	106	
1985	Tim Wallach	Montreal Expos	.260	.310	.450	22	81	
1986	Mike Schmidt^{†} (6)	Philadelphia Phillies	.290	.390	.547	37	119	
1987	Tim Wallach (2)	Montreal Expos	.298	.343	.514	26	123	
1988	Bobby Bonilla	Pittsburgh Pirates	.274	.366	.476	24	100	
1989	Howard Johnson	New York Mets	.287	.369	.559	36	101	
1990	Matt Williams	San Francisco Giants	.277	.319	.488	33	122	
1991	Howard Johnson (2)	New York Mets	.259	.342	.535	38	117	
1992	Gary Sheffield	San Diego Padres	.330	.385	.580	33	100	
1993	Matt Williams (2)	San Francisco Giants	.294	.325	.561	38	110	
1994	Matt Williams (3)	San Francisco Giants	.267	.319	.607	43	96	
1995	Vinny Castilla	Colorado Rockies	.309	.347	.564	32	90	
1996	Ken Caminiti	San Diego Padres	.326	.408	.621	40	130	
1997	Vinny Castilla (2)	Colorado Rockies	.304	.356	.547	40	113	
1998	Vinny Castilla (3)	Colorado Rockies	.319	.362	.589	46	144	
1999	Chipper Jones^{†}	Atlanta Braves	.319	.441	.633	45	110	
2000	Chipper Jones^{†} (2)	Atlanta Braves	.311	.404	.566	36	111	
2001	Albert Pujols	St. Louis Cardinals	.329	.403	.610	37	130	
2002	Scott Rolen^{†}	Philadelphia Phillies; St. Louis Cardinals	.266	.357	.503	31	110	
2003	Mike Lowell	Florida Marlins	.276	.350	.530	32	105	
2004	Adrián Beltré^{†}	Los Angeles Dodgers	.334	.388	.629	48	121	
2005	Morgan Ensberg	Houston Astros	.283	.388	.557	36	101	
2006	Miguel Cabrera	Florida Marlins	.339	.430	.568	26	114	
2007	David Wright	New York Mets	.325	.416	.546	30	107	
2008	David Wright (2)	New York Mets	.302	.390	.534	33	124	
2009	Ryan Zimmerman	Washington Nationals	.292	.364	.525	33	106	
2010	Ryan Zimmerman (2)	Washington Nationals	.307	.388	.510	25	85	
2011	Aramis Ramírez	Chicago Cubs	.306	.361	.510	26	93	
2012	Chase Headley	San Diego Padres	.286	.376	.498	31	115	
2013	Pedro Álvarez	Pittsburgh Pirates	.233	.296	.473	36	100	
2014	Anthony Rendon	Washington Nationals	.287	.351	.473	21	83	
2015	Nolan Arenado	Colorado Rockies	.287	.323	.575	42	130	
2016	Nolan Arenado (2)	Colorado Rockies	.294	.362	.570	41	133	
2017	Nolan Arenado (3)	Colorado Rockies	.309	.373	.586	37	130	
2018	Nolan Arenado (4)	Colorado Rockies	.297	.374	.561	38	110	
2019	Anthony Rendon (2)	Washington Nationals	.319	.412	.598	34	126	
2020	Manny Machado	San Diego Padres	.304	.370	.580	16	47	
2021	Austin Riley	Atlanta Braves	.303	.367	.531	33	107	
2022	Nolan Arenado (5)	St. Louis Cardinals	.293	.358	.533	30	103	
2023	Austin Riley (2)	Atlanta Braves	.281	.345	.516	37	97	
2024	Manny Machado (2)	San Diego Padres	.275	.325	.472	29	105	
2025	Manny Machado (3)	San Diego Padres	.275	.335	.460	27	95	
2026	Alex Bregman (2)	Chicago Cubs	.265	.355	.464	28	93	
