= Vinny Castilla =

Mexican baseball player (born 1967)

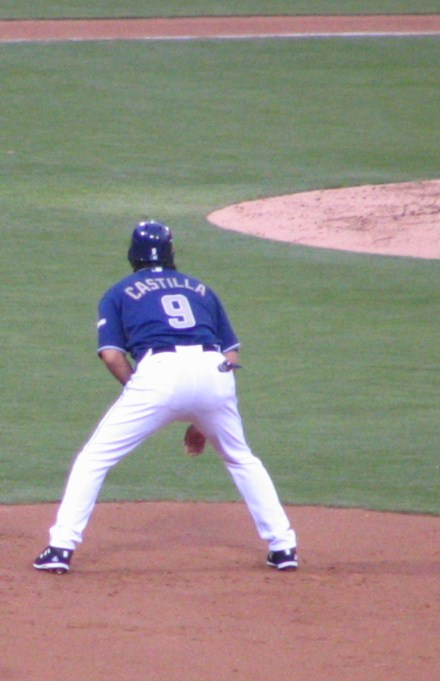
- Castilla with the San Diego Padres in 2006
- Third baseman
- Born: July 4, 1967 (age 59); Oaxaca City, Oaxaca, Mexico
- Batted: Right Threw: Right

MLB debut
- September 1, 1991, for the Atlanta Braves

Last MLB appearance
- September 28, 2006, for the Colorado Rockies

MLB statistics
- Batting average: .276
- Home runs: 320
- Runs batted in: 1,105
- Stats at Baseball Reference

Teams
- Atlanta Braves (1991–1992); Colorado Rockies (1993–1999); Tampa Bay Devil Rays (2000–2001); Houston Astros (2001); Atlanta Braves (2002–2003); Colorado Rockies (2004); Washington Nationals (2005); San Diego Padres (2006); Colorado Rockies (2006)

Career highlights and awards
- 2× All-Star (1995, 1998); 3× Silver Slugger Award (1995, 1997, 1998); NL RBI leader (2004)

Member of the Mexican Professional

Baseball Hall of Fame
- Induction: 2020

Vinicio "Vinny" Castilla Soria (Spanish pronunciation: [kasˈtiʎa]; born July 4, 1967) is a Mexican former Major League Baseball third baseman who played his best years with the Colorado Rockies. During his career, he played with the Atlanta Braves (1991–1992, 2002–2003), Colorado Rockies (1993–1999, 2004, 2006), Tampa Bay Devil Rays (2000–2001), Houston Astros (2001), Washington Nationals (2005), and San Diego Padres (2006). He currently serves as a special assistant to the Rockies GM Bill Schmidt.

== Baseball career (1991–2006) ==
=== Atlanta Braves (1991–1992) ===
The Atlanta Braves purchased Castilla's contract from the Saraperos de Saltillo out of the Mexican League in 1990. He made his MLB debut as a shortstop for the Braves on September 9, 1991. For the 1992 season he only appeared in eight games.

=== Colorado Rockies (1993–1999) ===
In November 1992 he was selected by the Rockies in the expansion draft. For the 1993 season he played regularly hitting nine home runs, nine triples (8th in the league) and 30 RBIs in 105 games as a shortstop. In 1994, his playing time was reduced due to the acquisition of shortstop Walt Weiss and the 1994-95 Major League Baseball strike. Castilla only saw action in 52 games, however he made the best of it, hitting .311 with 11 doubles, playing all four positions in the infield.

After the departure of starting third baseman Charlie Hayes, Castilla was the leading candidate to man third base for the 1995 season. This, along with the help of manager Don Baylor, was the turning point in Castilla's career. By the all star break he was hitting .319 with 17 home runs and 48 runs batted, earning him a backup spot in the All Star team. He was later named the starting third baseman for the NL after Matt Williams was out with an injury. He finished the season with a .309 batting average, 32 home runs, 34 doubles and 90 RBIs, earning his first Silver Slugger Award. In the NLDS against Atlanta he hit .467 with three home runs (two against Greg Maddux and one against John Smoltz). Many considered Castilla's numbers to be a fluke because he played his home games in the friendly confines of a thin-air Denver stadium, a stigma that would follow Vinny for most of his Colorado career. His performance earned him votes for the NL MVP award, finishing 18th on the ballot.

In 1996 he surpassed his numbers from the previous year. Playing in 160 games, he scored 97 runs, to go with 191 hits (7th in the NL) and 34 doubles. His 40th home run came in the last game of the season. He finished the year hitting .304 with 113 RBIs. At third base, he was NL leader in double plays turned (43) and assists (389).

For the 1997 season he would have exactly the same totals of home runs, RBIs and batting average (40/113/.304) than the prior year, as well as three multi-homer games. He earned his second Silver Slugger Award in three years. Defensively, for second year in a row, he led the league in both assists (323) and double plays for a third baseman (41).

Castilla's most productive season was 1998. On opening day he hit the first ever home run at Bank One Ballpark of Arizona Diamondbacks. That year he earned his second All-Star nod and his first Home Run Derby selection, in front of his home crowd in Colorado. Playing in all 162 games, he finished the season with 46 home runs (4th in the league), 144 RBIs (3rd), 206 hits (3rd), 380 total bases (3rd), 108 runs scored and a .319 batting average (10th in the league), all career-highs and good enough numbers to finish 11th in the NL MVP ballot.

On April 4, 1999, Castilla was a part of history as the Rockies played their Opening Day contest in his native Mexico at Estadio de Béisbol Monterrey in Monterrey. The game marked the first time MLB commenced the regular season outside of the United States or Canada. The Rockies' opponent were the defending National League champion San Diego Padres. Castilla delighted the crowd with four hits including a double, as Colorado won 8–2.

During the Monterrey series in Mexico, Castilla switched briefly to number 14 on his jersey, in honor of former Rockies first baseman Andrés Galarraga (then with the Atlanta Braves), who was diagnosed with cancer and missed the entire ‘99 season.

On June 6, 1999, Castilla produced his first career three-home run game against the Milwaukee Brewers. His offensive numbers slightly declined, hitting for a .275 batting average (first time in 5 years he failed to eclipse the .300 mark) He finished the season with 33 home runs, but for the 4th year in a row he had 100+ RBIs (102). He had the 3rd highest number of errors at third base with 19.

=== Tampa Bay Devil Rays (2000–2001) ===
Prior to the 2000 season, Castilla was sent to the Tampa Bay Devil Rays, a team that featured veteran sluggers Jose Canseco, Greg Vaughn and Fred McGriff. However, he played only in 85 games, hitting .221 with six home runs.

The following year, he played only 24 games for Tampa Bay before being traded to the Houston Astros.

=== Houston Astros (2001) ===
After playing only 24 games for Tampa Bay at the beginning of the 2001 season, Castilla went to play for the Houston Astros where he re-discovered his power at the plate. He played in 122 games, hitting 23 home runs (including three in one game against the Pirates on July 28) and 82 RBIs, making it to the post season with the Astros, where he hit .273 with a solo home run in the NLDS.

=== Return to the Atlanta Braves (2002–2003) ===
He was signed as a free agent by the Braves in 2002. Although his offensive numbers declined (.232/12/61), he established himself as a premier defender at third base, leading the league in fielding average with .982. In the postseason he hit a solid .320 with a home run and four RBIs. He played another season with the Braves in 2003, finishing the year with 22 homers and 76 runs batted in.

=== Return to the Colorado Rockies (2004) ===
He returned for a second stint with the Colorado Rockies for the 2004 season and had a tremendous year, hitting 43 doubles and 35 home runs, and led the league with 131 RBIs. Defensively Castilla had arguably his best season at third base, leading the league in fielding average and committing only six errors all year long. Despite his season performance, he was denied Gold Glove, Silver Slugger Award and All Star Game considerations.

=== Washington Nationals (2005) ===
Castilla moved on to play with the Washington Nationals in 2005, hitting 12 home runs and 66 RBIs in 142 games. He finished second among third basemen in fielding average, with .970.

=== San Diego Padres (2006) ===
In 2006, he played 72 games for the San Diego Padres before being released. He then signed with the Rockies for a third time to finish his career in Colorado. His last home run with the Rockies came on September 9, 2006, giving him a total of 239, good for 3rd all-time in franchise history.

=== Post Playing ===
Always a fan favorite in Colorado, Castilla was the last player to retire from the original 1993 Colorado roster. As of 2022, he is the all-time home run leader among Mexican-born players (320). He won three Silver Slugger Awards ('95, '97 and '98) and was selected twice to the All Star Game. He hit 30+ home runs six times (including three 40-homer seasons) and drove in 100+ runs five times. At the peak of his career (1995 to 1999) he averaged 38 home runs and 112 RBIs. In post season play he finished with a .350 average (21 hits on 60 at bats) in 17 games, with five homers and 12 RBIs. He played in 16 seasons for six different clubs, and averaged 165 hits, 28 home runs and 97 RBIs for every 162 games played.

== Post-playing career ==
He decided to retire after the Caribbean Series on February 7, 2007, becoming a special assistant to Rockies GM Dan O'Dowd.

In 2007, he was named manager of the Mexico baseball team for the Pan American Games, and also served as manager in the 2009 World Baseball Classic. In 2008, he was a player-manager for the Naranjeros de Hermosillo in the Mexican Pacific League.

Castilla and his wife, Samantha, have three sons, Vinicio Jr., Daulton and Cristian.

In 2020, Castilla was inducted into the Mexican Professional Baseball Hall of Fame.

== See also ==
- List of Colorado Rockies team records
- List of Major League Baseball career home run leaders
- List of Silver Slugger Award winners at third base
- List of Major League Baseball career runs batted in leaders
- List of Major League Baseball annual runs batted in leaders
