= Ken Reitz =

American baseball player (1951–2021)

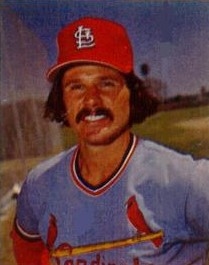
- Third baseman
- Born: June 24, 1951; San Francisco, California, U.S.
- Died: March 31, 2021 (aged 69); St. Charles, Missouri, U.S.
- Batted: Right Threw: Right

MLB debut
- September 5, 1972, for the St. Louis Cardinals

Last MLB appearance
- June 3, 1982, for the Pittsburgh Pirates

MLB statistics
- Batting average: .260
- Home runs: 68
- Runs batted in: 548
- Stats at Baseball Reference

Teams
- St. Louis Cardinals (1972–1975); San Francisco Giants (1976); St. Louis Cardinals (1977–1980); Chicago Cubs (1981); Pittsburgh Pirates (1982)

Career highlights and awards
- All-Star (1980); Gold Glove Award (1975)

Kenneth John Reitz (June 24, 1951 – March 31, 2021) was an American professional baseball third baseman who played 11 seasons in Major League Baseball (MLB). Nicknamed "Zamboni", he played for the St. Louis Cardinals, San Francisco Giants, Chicago Cubs, and Pittsburgh Pirates from 1972 to 1982. He won the Gold Glove Award in 1975 and was an All-Star in 1980. He retired with the highest all-time career fielding percentage for National League third basemen at .970 after leading the National League in fielding percentage a record six times.

== Early life ==
Reitz was born in San Francisco on June 24, 1951. He attended Jefferson High School in nearby Daly City. He was subsequently drafted by the St. Louis Cardinals in the 31st round of the 1969 Major League Baseball draft.

== Professional career ==
Reitz played four seasons in the minor leagues from 1969 to 1972. He made his MLB debut on September 5, 1972, at the age of 21, batting 2-for-3 with two runs scored and a run batted in (RBI) in a 5–3 win over the Montreal Expos. In his rookie season the following year, he replaced Joe Torre as the Cardinals' starting third baseman, with Torre returning to first base. Reitz garnered the nickname "Zamboni" for his skill at scooping up ground balls on the artificial turf of Busch Memorial Stadium. He led all National League (NL) third basemen in fielding percentage in 1973 and 1974, and won the NL Gold Glove Award at the position in 1975. This ended Doug Rader's streak of five consecutive Gold Gloves. He was traded to the San Francisco Giants for Pete Falcone at the Winter Meetings on December 8, 1975.

Reitz played just one season with the Giants before being traded back to the Cardinals for Lynn McGlothen on December 10, 1976. He again led the NL in fielding percentage at third base in 1977, 1978, and 1980. He also established the NL record for fewest errors by a third baseman (9) in 1977; he bettered that record by committing only eight in 1980. He was a starter in the 1980 MLB All-Star Game. He was subsequently traded to the Chicago Cubs for Bruce Sutter on December 9 of that same year. He led NL third basemen in fielding percentage for a sixth time in 1981, but played in just 82 games and was released prior to the 1982 season. He signed for the Pittsburgh Pirates in mid-May and went hitless in 11 plate appearances. He played his final major league game on June 3, 1982, several weeks short of his 31st birthday, and was released two days later.

In his career, Reitz batted .260 with 68 home runs and 548 RBIs in 1344 games played. He started the 1980 season batting over .400 until cooling off in the middle of May, finishing the season at .270. After batting .235 during his rookie season he finished below .250 only once over the next seven seasons. In each of his first five full seasons he increased his RBI production: 42 in 1973, 54 in 1974, 63 in 1975, 66 in 1976 (his only season with his hometown Giants), and 79 in 1977. Reitz established a career-high in home runs in 1977 with 17 – the same number he had hit in his previous three seasons total.

Reitz played a key role in the second-longest major league game played in terms of innings. On September 11, 1974, against the New York Mets at Shea Stadium, with the Cardinals trailing 3–1 with two out in the ninth and pinch runner Larry Herndon on base, he hit a home run off starter Jerry Koosman to send the game into extra innings. The score remained tied 3–3 until Bake McBride scored the winning run from first base on two Met errors in the top of the 25th inning.

== Later life ==
After retiring from baseball, Reitz undertook promotional work for the Cardinals, taking part in the Cardinals Caravan during the offseason. He also took up golf and played on the celebrity tour.

Ken Reitz died on March 31, 2021, at the age of 69. Survivors include a daughter, son, and six grandchildren.

== See also ==
- List of Major League Baseball career assists as a third baseman leaders
- List of Major League Baseball career games played as a third baseman leaders
- List of Major League Baseball career putouts as a third baseman leaders
- List of people from San Francisco
- St. Louis Cardinals award winners and league leaders

Awards and achievements
Preceded by Ron Cey	National League Player of the Month; May 1977	Succeeded by George Foster
