= Legacy of Roberto Clemente =

Impact of Puerto Rican baseball player

Roberto Clemente is considered one of Puerto Rico's most important Major League Baseball players and became the first Latin American player to enter the National Baseball Hall of Fame and Museum. As a humanitarian, he became known for his philanthropic activities and for being outspoken in civic issues that affected the Hispanic and Latino communities. In both of these facets, Clemente left a long-lasting legacy that remains socially relevant and the subject of academic study and recognitions over fifty years after his death.

== Influence on players ==
MLB shortstop Carlos Correa has shared what he admired most about Clemente as a player: "The passion, the way he played, the way he went about his business every single day. Every time he put on his uniform he felt like the luckiest man in the world so that for me is what I admire most."

== Catholic canonization effort ==
Richard Rossi, a former evangelical minister, submitted a request to the Holy See to consider Clemente's canonization as a saint. The Congregation for the Causes of Saints, responsible for these issues, responded by confirming receipt of the letter and directing Rossi to work through the Archbishop of San Juan – the jurisdiction in which Clemente died; Rossi issued a press release showing a picture of the response and said that it showed that the Pope was personally supporting Rossi's effort.

Rossi received positive comments from the executive director of the Clemente Museum in Pittsburgh, while Carmen Nanko-Fernandez, from the Chicago Theological Union, was not confident that Clemente would be canonized, saying that Hispanic Catholics can continue to privately venerate Clemente. Neil Walker, a Roman Catholic whose father was a teammate of Clemente, stated that "he's somebody who lived his life serving others, really. So if it would happen, I wouldn't be terribly surprised by it."

In July 2017, Rossi said that the canonization requirement of a miracle was met that month when Jamie Nieto, who played Clemente in Rossi's film and was paralyzed from the neck down in a backflip accident three years after the Clemente film was released, walked 130 steps at his own wedding to fellow Olympian Shevon Stoddart; Nieto stated that the success was due to his hard work, and the Holy See stated that they were not in continued contact with Rossi.

== In culture ==
Clemente's life has been the subject of numerous books, articles, and documentaries:

1968, 1973: Roberto Clemente, Batting King by Arnold Hano

1973: Roberto Clemente by Ira Miller (UPI)

1973: A Touch Of Royalty, a documentary narrated in English and Spanish versions by Puerto Rican Academy Award winner actor José Ferrer.

1973: Olu Clemente — The Philosopher of Baseball, a bilingual play featuring poetry, music and dancing, by Miguel Algarin and Jesús Abraham Laviera, performed on August 30, 1973, at the Delacorte Theatre, Central Park, and published in 1979 in Nuevos pasos: Chicano and Puerto Rican drama by Nicolás Kanellos and Jorge A. Huerta.

1974: Who Was Roberto? A Biography of Roberto Clemente by Phil Musick

1993: Roberto Clemente: A Video Tribute to One of Baseball's Greatest Players and a True Humanitarian, documentary directed by Rich Domich and Michael Kostel, narrated by Puerto Rican actors Raul Julia (in Spanish) and Héctor Elizondo (in English).

2006: Clemente: The Passion and Grace of Baseball's Last Hero by David Maraniss.

2008: "Roberto Clemente": One-hour biography as part of the Public Broadcasting Service history series, American Experience which premiered on April 21, 2008. The film is directed by Bernardo Ruiz, narrated by Jimmy Smits and features interviews with Vera Clemente, Orlando Cepeda and George F. Will. The production received an ALMA Award.

2010: Chasing 3000 a movie based on a true story of two kids who travel from Los Angeles to Pittsburgh hoping to see Clemente's 3,000th hit.

2011: 21: The Story of Roberto Clemente was released, a graphic novel by Wilfred Santiago (published by Fantagraphics) detailing Clemente's life in a comic-book format. In their USA Today Magazine article titled "Saluting Pittsburgh's Finest" Richard E. Vatz and Lee S. Weinberg said Clemente was "arguably the best in the history of the game" and stated that "understanding the magnitude of Roberto Clemente requires an appreciation of the gestalt of his presence, which was greater than the sum of his statistics".

2011: DC-7: The Roberto Clemente Story, a bilingual musical about Clemente's life, had its world premiere in November 2011 with a full house at the Teatro SEA in Manhattan before moving to New York's Puerto Rican Traveling Theatre for a successful seven-week run. The show ran from December 6 through December 16, 2012 at Puerto Rico's Teatro Francisco Arrivi.

2013: Baseball's Last Hero: 21 Clemente Stories, the first feature dramatic film on Clemente's life was finished by California filmmaker and Pittsburgh native Richard Rossi.

== Artwork ==
Clemente has been honored with statues and other artwork in several locations.

The Pirates originally erected a statue in memory of Clemente at Three Rivers Stadium, just before the 1994 Major League Baseball All-Star Game. It has since been moved to PNC Park when it opened in 2001, and stands outside the park's centerfield gates.

The Louisville Slugger Museum & Factory unveiled a lifelife statue of Clemente in 2021 in a ceremony with his sons. It was dedicated by Roberto Clemente Jr. on what would have been his father's 87th birthday.

== See also ==
- The Clemente Museum, Pittsburgh
- Roberto Clemente Award
- Roberto Clemente Bridge
- Statue of Roberto Clemente
