= Statue of Roberto Clemente =

Statue of Roberto Clemente may refer to:

- Statue of Roberto Clemente (Pittsburgh): A statue of baseball player Roberto Clemente which was dedicated by the Pittsburgh Pirates outside Three Rivers Stadium in 1994 and then re-dedicated in 2001 upon the opening of PNC Park.
- Statue of Roberto Clemente (New York City): A statue of baseball player Roberto Clemente which was installed at Roberto Clemente State Park in the Bronx, New York in 2013.
