= Tom Walker (1970s pitcher) =

American baseball player (1948–2023)

- Pitcher
- Born: November 7, 1948; Tampa, Florida, U.S.
- Died: October 23, 2023 (aged 74); Gibsonia, Pennsylvania, U.S.
- Batted: Right Threw: Right

MLB debut
- April 23, 1972, for the Montreal Expos

Last MLB appearance
- July 23, 1977, for the California Angels

MLB statistics
- Win–loss record: 18–23
- Earned run average: 3.87
- Strikeouts: 262
- Stats at Baseball Reference

Teams
- Montreal Expos (1972–1974); Detroit Tigers (1975); St. Louis Cardinals (1976); Montreal Expos (1977); California Angels (1977)

Robert Thomas Walker (November 7, 1948 – October 23, 2023) was an American professional baseball pitcher. Walker pitched all or part of six seasons in Major League Baseball (MLB), from 1972 until 1977, for the Montreal Expos, Detroit Tigers, St. Louis Cardinals and California Angels. A right-hander, he stood 6 feet 1 inch (1.85 m) tall and weighed 188 pounds (85 kg).

== Career ==
After graduating from George D. Chamberlain High School in his native Tampa in 1966, Walker was selected by the Baltimore Orioles in the 1968 January amateur draft. On August 4, 1971, while playing for the Dallas-Fort Worth Spurs in the Double-A Dixie Association, Walker threw a 15-inning no-hitter to beat the Albuquerque Dodgers 1–0. He threw 193 pitches to win the game. In 1972, Walker was selected by the Montreal Expos in the Rule 5 draft and made his major league debut that season. He was traded along with Terry Humphrey from the Expos to the Tigers for Woodie Fryman on December 4, 1974. The last batter he faced in the majors, Lyman Bostock, lined into a triple play. Walker posted an 18–23 record in 191 major league appearances over six seasons.

== Brush with death ==
In 1972, while playing winter ball in Puerto Rico, Walker and several other players helped Roberto Clemente load a plane carrying relief supplies to survivors of the Nicaragua earthquake after Christmas. He offered to accompany Clemente on the trip to the Central American nation, but the plane was full and Clemente told him to stay behind and enjoy his New Year's Eve. A few hours later, Walker returned to his condo and saw the news reports that Clemente's plane had crashed off the coast of Isla Verde, Puerto Rico. There were no survivors.

== Personal life ==
Walker and his wife, Carolyn, lived in Gibsonia, Pennsylvania. Their son, Neil, is a former MLB player who retired in 2021. Another son, Matt, played in the minor leagues as an outfielder in the Tigers' and Orioles' systems, while another son, Sean, pitched for George Mason University. Tom was also the brother-in-law of former Montreal Expos pitcher Chip Lang. Meanwhile, Don Kelly, a former Tigers outfielder, married Walker's daughter Carrie, a former professional basketball player, in 2007.

In July 2015, Walker was elected to the Texas League Hall of Fame.

Walker died in Gibsonia from pancreatic cancer on October 23, 2023, at age 74.

== See also ==
- List of second-generation Major League Baseball players
