= Neil Walker =

American baseball player (born 1985)

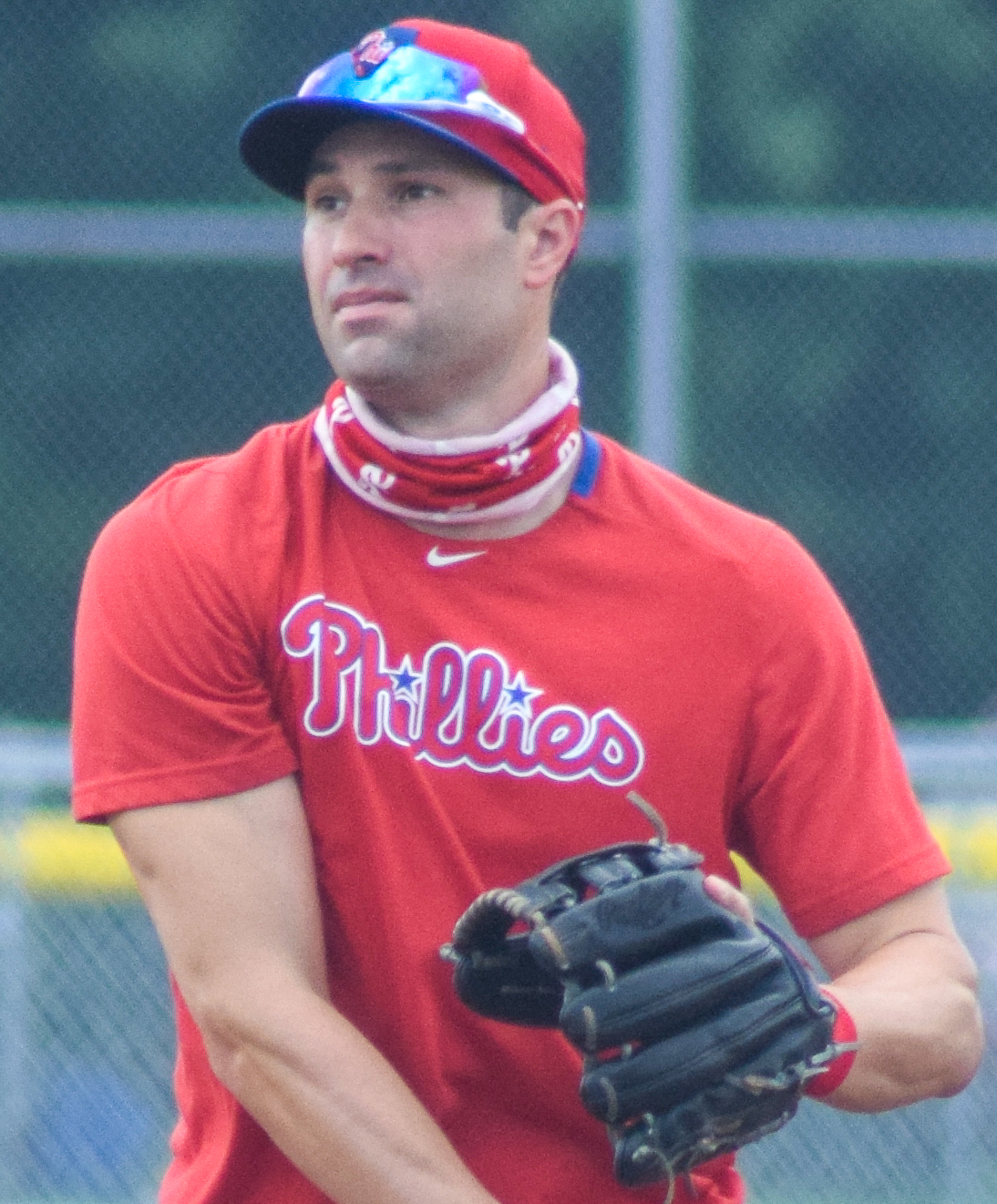
- Walker with the Phillies in 2020
- Second baseman
- Born: September 10, 1985 (age 41); Pittsburgh, Pennsylvania, U.S.
- Batted: Switch Threw: Right

MLB debut
- September 1, 2009, for the Pittsburgh Pirates

Last MLB appearance
- September 8, 2020, for the Philadelphia Phillies

MLB statistics
- Batting average: .267
- Home runs: 149
- Runs batted in: 609
- Stats at Baseball Reference

Teams
- Pittsburgh Pirates (2009–2015); New York Mets (2016–2017); Milwaukee Brewers (2017); New York Yankees (2018); Miami Marlins (2019); Philadelphia Phillies (2020)

Career highlights and awards
- Silver Slugger Award (2014)

Neil Martin Andrew Walker (born September 10, 1985) is an American former professional baseball second baseman and current broadcaster. He played 12 seasons in Major League Baseball (MLB) for the Pittsburgh Pirates, New York Mets, Milwaukee Brewers, New York Yankees, Miami Marlins, and Philadelphia Phillies.

Walker was drafted by his hometown Pittsburgh Pirates in the first round of the 2004 MLB draft, and made his MLB debut with them in 2009. He won a Silver Slugger Award in 2014. After his retirement in 2021, Walker joined the Pirates broadcast team as a color analyst.

== Early life ==
Walker, the son of former major league pitcher Tom Walker (1972–77), was born in Pittsburgh, Pennsylvania, he grew up outside of Pittsburgh in the nearby North Hills suburbs and attended Pine-Richland High School. He graduated in 2004. He played catcher on the baseball team and a wide receiver for the football team. Walker, who also played on the Rams' basketball team until his senior year, was a two-time Pittsburgh Post-Gazette Male Athlete of the Year. His baseball uniform number #24, was retired from Pine-Richland during a pre-game ceremony before the Pittsburgh Pirates' July 22, 2010, game.

Neil grew up as a fan of the Pittsburgh Pirates, and attended many of the team's games while sitting in the "Peanut Heaven" section of Three Rivers Stadium. In 1994, he attended the All-Star Game, where he obtained the signatures of Ken Griffey Jr. and Frank Thomas. To this day, those signed baseballs are among his most prized baseball possessions. Prior to being drafted by the Pirates, Walker approached the University of Pittsburgh and Penn State about doubling in baseball and football; however, he passed on those options out of concern that Penn State wanted him to add 60 pounds and become a tight end.

== Professional baseball career (2007-2020) ==
=== Minor leagues ===
The Pittsburgh Pirates selected Walker in the first round of the 2004 Major League Baseball draft. At the beginning of the 2007 season and after three minor league campaigns, Baseball America rated him No. 74 on their list of Top 100 prospects, and No. 3 in the Pirates' organization, behind Andrew McCutchen and Brad Lincoln.

In 2007, the Pirates invited Walker to spring training as a non-roster player, where he was converted from his drafted position of catcher to third baseman. He was sent back to the Pirates Double-A affiliate Altoona Curve where he spent the majority of the season. On May 15, 2007, he became the first Curve player to have a four-hit game, going 4-for-4 with a home run, double and two RBI against the Portland Sea Dogs. Walker hit a pair of two-run home runs on May 27, 2007, helping the Curve end a 10-game losing streak against the Bowie Baysox. He hit a grand slam and drove in five runs on June 28, 2007, in the second game of a double-header against the Trenton Thunder.

Walker was promoted to the Triple-A Indianapolis Indians for the 2008 season, where he played 133 games, compiling a .242 average with 16 home runs, 80 RBI and 10 stolen bases.

=== Pittsburgh Pirates ===
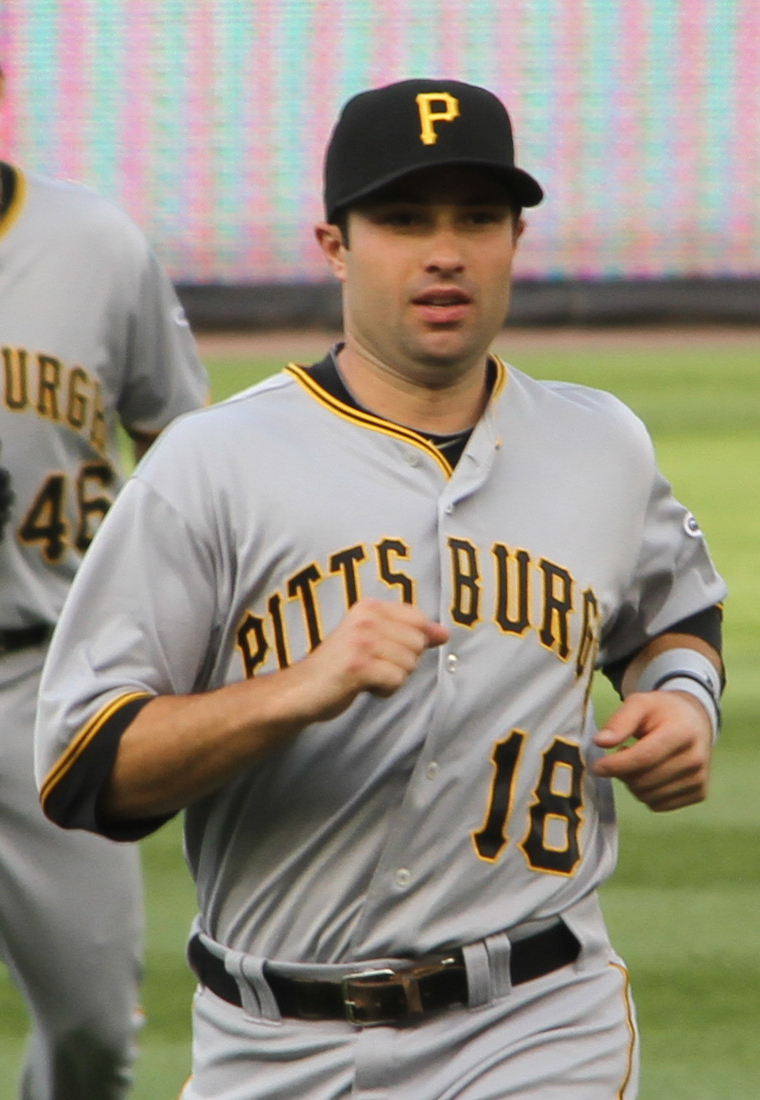
Walker with the Pirates

==== 2009 ====
Walker spent the majority of the season again with the Pirates Triple-A affiliate Indianapolis Indians. In 95 games, he hit .264 with 69 RBI and 5 stolen bases. He received his first Major League call-up on September 1, 2009, and served as a pinch-hitter for Pirates starter Charlie Morton that night against the Cincinnati Reds. His first career hit came five days later against Jason Motte of the St. Louis Cardinals, a single to right field. He never became an every day regular player and finished the season hitting .194 in 17 games.

==== 2010 ====
Walker spent most of spring training with the Pirates in Bradenton, Florida, before being reassigned back to the Indians. He hit .321 with six home runs, 26 RBI and 10 stolen bases in 43 games with Indianapolis and on May 25, 2010, he was called back up to the Pirates when first baseman Steve Pearce was placed on the disabled list with a sprained ankle.

He made his first Major League start of the year that night against the Cincinnati Reds, playing at third base. He hit an RBI double in the 8th inning off Reds starter Mike Leake. But his role on the team was initially in question, as Andy LaRoche had been the Pirates every day third baseman. With starting second baseman Akinori Iwamura struggling, Pirates manager John Russell played Walker at second base – a position where he had only played 23 career games at any level. He hit his first Major League home run on June 1, 2010, off Chicago Cubs starter Ted Lilly.

Walker missed hitting for the cycle by only a triple on June 25, 2010, against the Oakland Athletics. He doubled and scored a run in the first inning, singled in the third and then hit his 3rd home run off Athletics starter Ben Sheets. However, he was forced to leave the game after being nearly knocked unconscious by teammate Ryan Church's knee when the two accidentally collided going for a fly ball. He then missed the following seven games with concussion-like symptoms before returning to action on July 3.

Walker scored a career-high three times in a 12–6 win over the Houston Astros on July 17, 2010. He hit 3rd in the Pirates batting order, going 3-for-5 with 3 runs and 2 RBI. He set another career high three days later, recording five hits in one game against the Milwaukee Brewers, finishing the night 5-for-5 with a run scored and an RBI. Walker became the first Pirate rookie since fellow Pittsburgh native John Wehner in 1991 to have a five-hit game. His hitting tear was finally ended on July 23, 2010, against the San Diego Padres, after recording six straight multi-hit games. He was batting .593 in that time (16-for-27) with four runs scored and eight RBIs.

Walker kicked off August with three hits while driving in a career-high four runs in a 7–6 win over the Cincinnati Reds on August 3, 2010. Walker played a pivotal role in a series win over the St. Louis Cardinals, driving in three runs against Cy Young hopeful Adam Wainwright on August 24 and then repeating the feat the very next day against Jake Westbrook. Following his performances against St. Louis, Walker then went on an 18-game hitting streak, from August 23 through September 12. The streak was the longest by any Pirate hitter in 2010 and the longest by any Pirate rookie since Rennie Stennett also recorded an 18-game streak in 1971.

Walker finished the 2010 season batting .296 with 12 home runs and 66 RBIs. His 54 RBIs after the All-Star Break tied with Cardinals slugger Albert Pujols for the 3rd best mark in the National League.

He was named the second baseman on Baseball America's 2010 All-Rookie Team. He was also named the second baseman on the 2010 Topps Major League Rookie All-Star Team.

==== 2011 ====
After playing nearly every position on the diamond from catcher to the outfield, Walker finally settled in as a Major League second-baseman.

New Pirates manager Clint Hurdle was also full of praise for Walker, who reported early to training camp with the pitchers and catchers, saying "He was really thrown into the fire last season, having to learn the position at the major league level, which is challenging and very difficult, but, to his credit, he pulled it off."

Walker hit his first career Major League grand slam on opening day, April 1, 2011, in the 5th inning off Chicago Cubs starter Ryan Dempster, joining Roberto Clemente as the only Pirates players to hit a grand slam on opening day. On May 20, Walker's bobblehead night at PNC Park, he drove in a career-high 5 RBIs against the Detroit Tigers in a 10–1 Pirate win.

==== 2012 ====
After dealing with various back issues in August and September, Walker was shut down for the season on September 29 with a herniated disc in his back.

==== 2013 ====
Walker was activated from the disabled list on May 13 after spending some time with the Altoona Curve.

==== 2014 ====
Walker was placed on the disabled list June 9 after undergoing an emergency Appendectomy thus allowing a roster spot for top prospect Gregory Polanco. On Opening Day March 31, Walker hit a walk off home run in a 1–0 victory in the 10th against the Chicago Cubs. On September 14, Walker hit his 20th home run of the season (a new career high) also setting a new record for home runs in a season by Pirates second-basemen, a record which was previously held by Bill Mazeroski.

Walker ended the 2014 campaign with a .271 average with 23 home runs and 76 runs batted in. He became the first Pirates second baseman since Johnny Ray in 1983 to win the silver slugger award.

==== 2015 ====
On May 9, 2015, during a 7–5 win over the Cardinals, the Pirates became the first MLB team to turn a 4–5–4 triple play. The play occurred when the Cardinals' Yadier Molina lined out to Walker. Walker threw to Jung-ho Kang at third base to double off Jhonny Peralta for the second out. Kang then threw the ball back to Walker, who was standing on second base, for the final out after Jason Heyward froze between second and third.

=== New York Mets ===
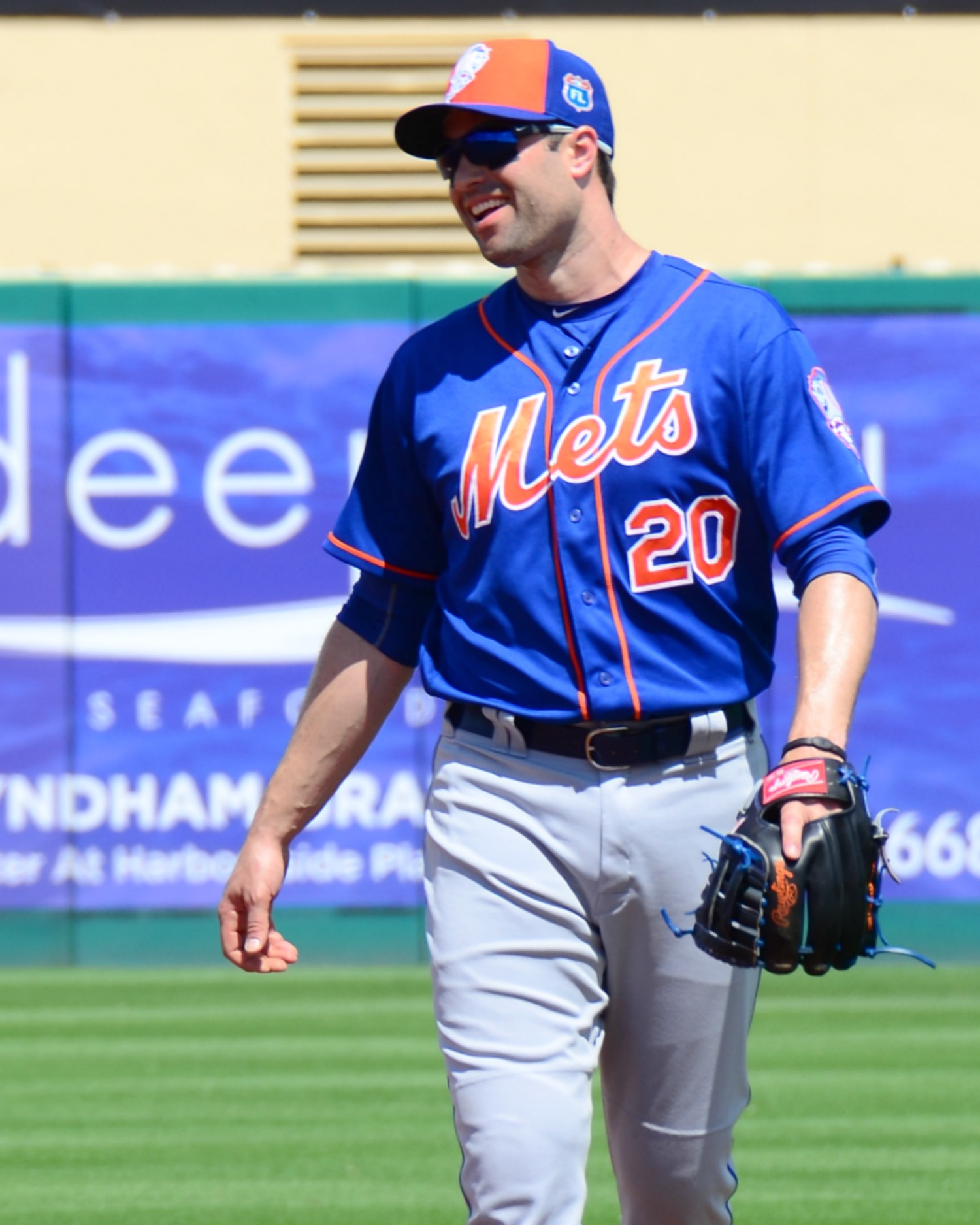
Walker with the New York Mets in 2016 spring training

On December 9, 2015, the Pirates traded Walker to the New York Mets for Jon Niese. On January 29, 2016, Walker signed a one-year, $10.55 million deal avoiding arbitration.

==== 2016 ====
On April 23, 2016, Walker hit his 100th career home run in a game against the Atlanta Braves. On April 27, Walker hit his 9th home run of April, tying a Mets franchise monthly record. On September 9, Walker underwent a lumbar microdiscectomy at Hospital for Special Surgery in New York, ending his season. Despite appearing in only 113 games, Walker tied a career high with 23 home runs and finished with a .282 batting average. After the season, Walker became a free agent for the first time in his career.

==== 2017 ====
On November 14, 2016, Walker signed a qualifying offer from the Mets for one year worth $17.2 million. On June 14, Walker suffered a partial tear in his left hamstring and was placed on the disabled list the following day. On July 28, Walker was activated from the disabled list. On August 8 at Citi Field, Walker made his first career Major League start at first base.

=== Milwaukee Brewers ===
On August 12, 2017, Walker was traded to the Milwaukee Brewers for a player to be named later (Eric Hanhold).

=== New York Yankees ===
On March 12, 2018, Walker signed a one-year, $4 million contract with the New York Yankees. On August 9, 2018, in a game against the Texas Rangers, he hit a home run from both sides of the plate in the same game for the first time in his career.

=== Miami Marlins ===
Walker signed a one-year contract for $2 million with the Miami Marlins on January 29, 2019. Walker elected free agency after the season ended on October 31.

=== Philadelphia Phillies ===
On January 22, 2020, Walker signed a minor league deal with the Philadelphia Phillies. On August 13, 2020, he pitched 2/3 of an inning, facing 3 batters, walking 1, for a 0.00 ERA in the Phillies 11-4 loss to the Baltimore Orioles. He was designated for assignment on September 11. Walker was outrighted two days later but refused his outright assignment and elected free agency on September 14.

== Broadcasting career (2021-present) ==
On April 20, 2021, Walker announced his retirement from professional baseball. In July, it was announced that Walker would be joining the Pirates broadcast team for select games. He made his broadcasting debut in Pittsburgh on August 18, serving as the color analyst during a doubleheader with the Brewers. Walker was promoted to a full time commentator prior to the 2022 season.

== Personal life ==
Neil's brother, Matt, played outfield for George Washington University and in the minor leagues in the Detroit Tigers and Baltimore Orioles systems. Neil's other brother, Sean, pitched for George Mason University. His sister, Carrie, is a former professional basketball player. Carrie married Don Kelly, a fellow Major League Baseball player. His uncle, Chip Lang is a former Montreal Expos pitcher.

Walker attended high school with his future wife, Niki, who was one year ahead of him; however, they did not begin dating until a few years after he began his professional baseball career. The couple's first child, a daughter, was born on August 23, 2016.

During the 2010 season, Walker was one of only two Major League players to still live with his parents. The other was pitcher Tyson Ross. "He's really not thrilled about that. We try to give him his space," said his mother Carolyn, although Walker himself said he loves life at home. However, Walker announced at Pirate Camp prior to the 2011 season that his mom finally kicked him out of their North Hills area home.

Walker idolized Bill Mazeroski as a youth and received instruction from the great Pirates second-baseman during spring training, which provided invaluable help when Walker was called upon to play the position after Akinori Iwamura's struggles. He was also a fan of Pirates' outfielder Andy Van Slyke, whom he watched play at Three Rivers Stadium.

Walker is a Catholic. He led the effort to provide weekly Mass to fellow Catholics on the Pirates as well as Catholics from the visiting team. Walker states that Mass services are an important part of his life because they "combat the negative qualities" found in living the lifestyle of a Major League Baseball player. He also was a guest on Blessed2Play, a national radio show hosted by Ron Meyer where Neil discussed his faith and career.

Walker's father (Tom), a former teammate of Roberto Clemente, reflected about his son's career when discussing Clemente's death in 1972. Before taking off on the flight that he would die on, Clemente insisted that Walker's father not join him on his humanitarian mission. Walker's father said Clemente saved his life and allowed him to have his family, including Neil Walker.

== See also ==
- List of second-generation Major League Baseball players
