= Roberto Clemente Charter School =

- 131 W Hamilton St; Allentown, Pennsylvania 18101; United States

Information
- Type: Public (Charter)
- Established: 2000
- School board: Seven trustees locally appointed
- NCES School ID: 420006807636
- K-5 -Elementary Principal: Cory Snyder
- 6-8 - Middle School Principal: Ralph Andrews
- 9-12 - High School Principal: Joshua Burak
- Faculty: 96.00 (on an FTE basis)
- Enrollment: 619 (2024–25)
- Student to teacher ratio: 12.63
- Language: Spanish and English
- Campus type: Midsize city
- Website: www.myrccs.com

Roberto Clemente Charter School is a small, urban, public charter school located in Allentown, Pennsylvania in the Lehigh Valley region of eastern Pennsylvania. The school is located at 4th and Walnut Streets in Allentown. It serves students in grades K through 12.

As of the 2024–25 school year, the school had an enrollment of 619 students, according to National Center for Education Statistics data. Approximately 94% of the students then enrolled at Roberto Clemente Charter School were Hispanic.

In 2011, Roberto Clemente Charter School applied to the Allentown School Board to broaden its program to include kindergarten through 5th grades. The application was denied by the Allentown School Board 5 against-4 vote. The Charter School's board appealed to the Pennsylvania Charter School Appeal Board, which in August 2013 reversed the Allentown School Board's denial decision, allowing the expansion of the charter school. In March 2014, Roberto Clemente Charter School reached an agreement to purchase a school building on Cedar Street in Allentown.

Roberto Clemente Charter School is named for Roberto Clemente, a 12-time Gold Glove Award winner with the Pittsburgh Pirates whose Major League Baseball career was cut short by his 1972 death in a plane crash.

Roberto Clemente Charter School is one of four public charter schools operating in Lehigh County in 2013. According to the Pennsylvania Department of Education, in 2012, there were 50,605 children in Lehigh County who were enrolled in public charter schools.
