= Bridge Park =

Bridge Park may refer to:

- Bridge Park (Bronx), a park in the Bronx, New York, U.S.
- Bridge Park (Dublin, Ohio), a mixed-used development in Dublin, Ohio, U.S.
