= Vera Zabala =

Puerto Rican philanthropist (1941–2019)

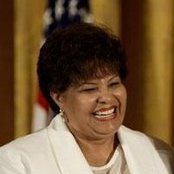
- Born: Vera Cristina Zabala Vivada; March 6, 1941; Carolina, Puerto Rico
- Died: November 16, 2019 (aged 78); San Juan, Puerto Rico
- Other name: Vera Clemente
- Occupation: philanthropist
- Years active: 1964–2019
- Known for: chair of the Roberto Clemente Foundation, founder of the Ciudad Deportiva Roberto Clemente
- Spouse: Roberto Clemente
- Children: 3; Including Roberto Jr.

Vera Zabala Clemente (March 6, 1941 – November 16, 2019) was a Puerto Rican philanthropist who was the head of the Roberto Clemente Foundation. She founded a sports education facility in Puerto Rico and was a Goodwill Ambassador for Major League Baseball. She was the wife of baseball player Roberto Clemente, who died in 1972, and the mother of sportscaster Roberto Clemente Jr. She went to the White House in 2003 to receive her husband's posthumous Presidential Medal of Freedom.

== Early life ==
Vera Cristina Zabala was born in Carolina, Puerto Rico in 1941. She graduated from the University of Puerto Rico, and worked as a bank teller as a young woman.

== Career ==
Zabala was chair of the Roberto Clemente Foundation, and a Goodwill Ambassador for Major League Baseball. She and her three young sons attended Roberto Clemente's posthumous induction into the Baseball Hall of Fame in 1973. In his memory, she established the Ciudad Deportiva Roberto Clemente, a sports education facility in Carolina, Puerto Rico, supported by grants, loans, and an annual telethon that she hosted. "My main purpose was to do what he was planning to do," she said in a 1994 interview. She also established a pediatric clinic in Nicaragua in his memory.

She was active in choosing the recipients of the annual Roberto Clemente Award. She was a familiar figure at charity events in Puerto Rico and in Pittsburgh, where her husband played baseball. In 1982, she was the first woman to be named captain of a major league All-Star team, when she was captain of the National League team that year.

On July 23, 2003, she went to the White House to receive the Presidential Medal of Freedom on behalf of her husband. The award was made by George W. Bush for her husband's charitable works.

== Personal life ==
Vera Zabala married Roberto Clemente in 1964. They had three sons, Roberto Jr., Luis, and Enrique, a few years before Roberto Clemente died in a plane crash in 1972. She died in 2019, aged 78 years, after a brief hospitalization in San Juan, Puerto Rico.
