= Roberto Clemente Jr. =

Puerto Rican baseball player

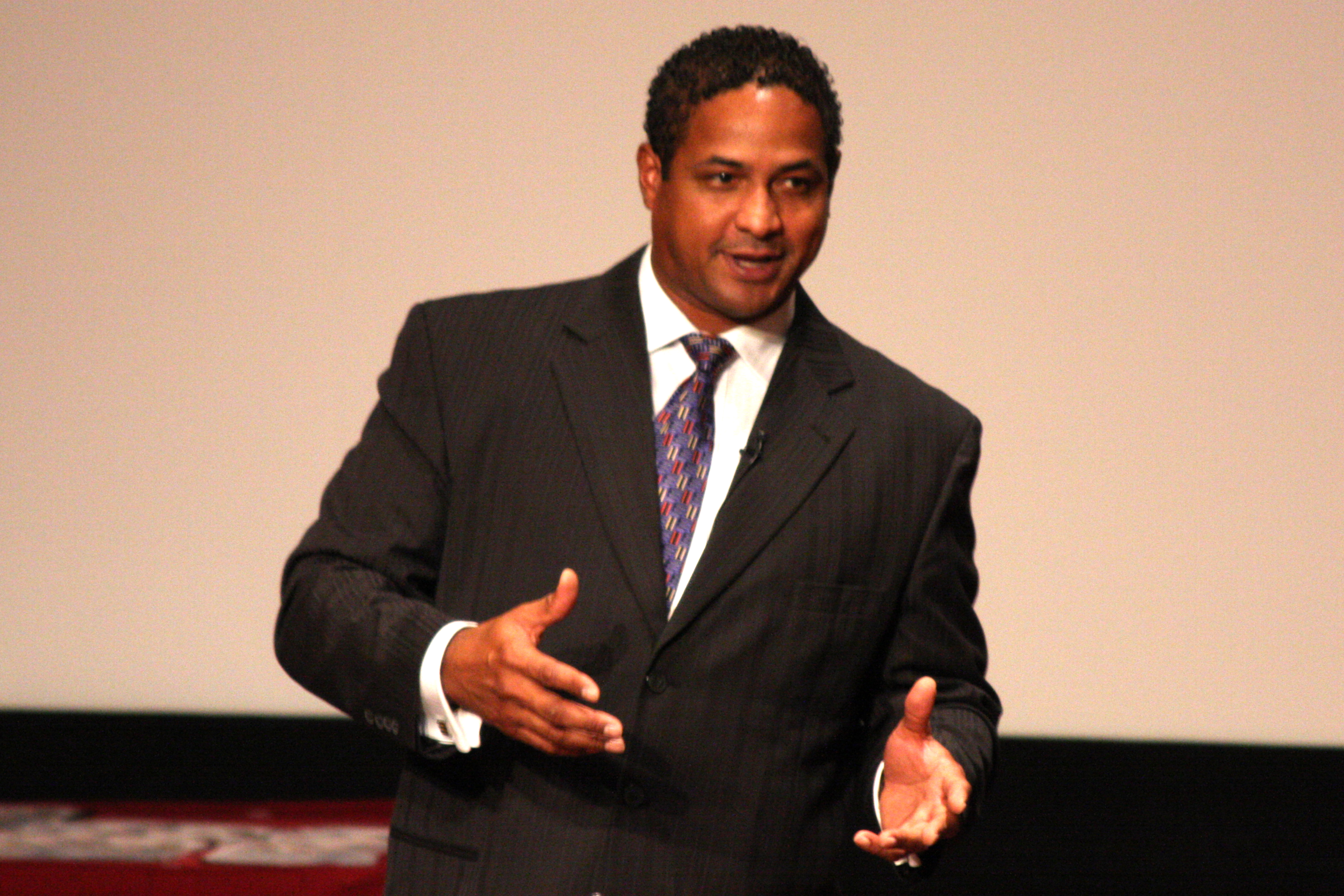
Roberto Clemente Jr.

Roberto Clemente Zabala (born August 17, 1965), better known as Roberto Clemente Jr., is a Puerto Rican baseball broadcaster and former professional baseball player.

His father and namesake Roberto Clemente was the first Latin American player to compile 3,000 hits in Major League Baseball history. His mother Vera Clemente hosted a telethon in Puerto Rico in order to raise funds for the Ciudad Roberto Clemente, a sporting complex located in Carolina, Puerto Rico.

== Biography ==
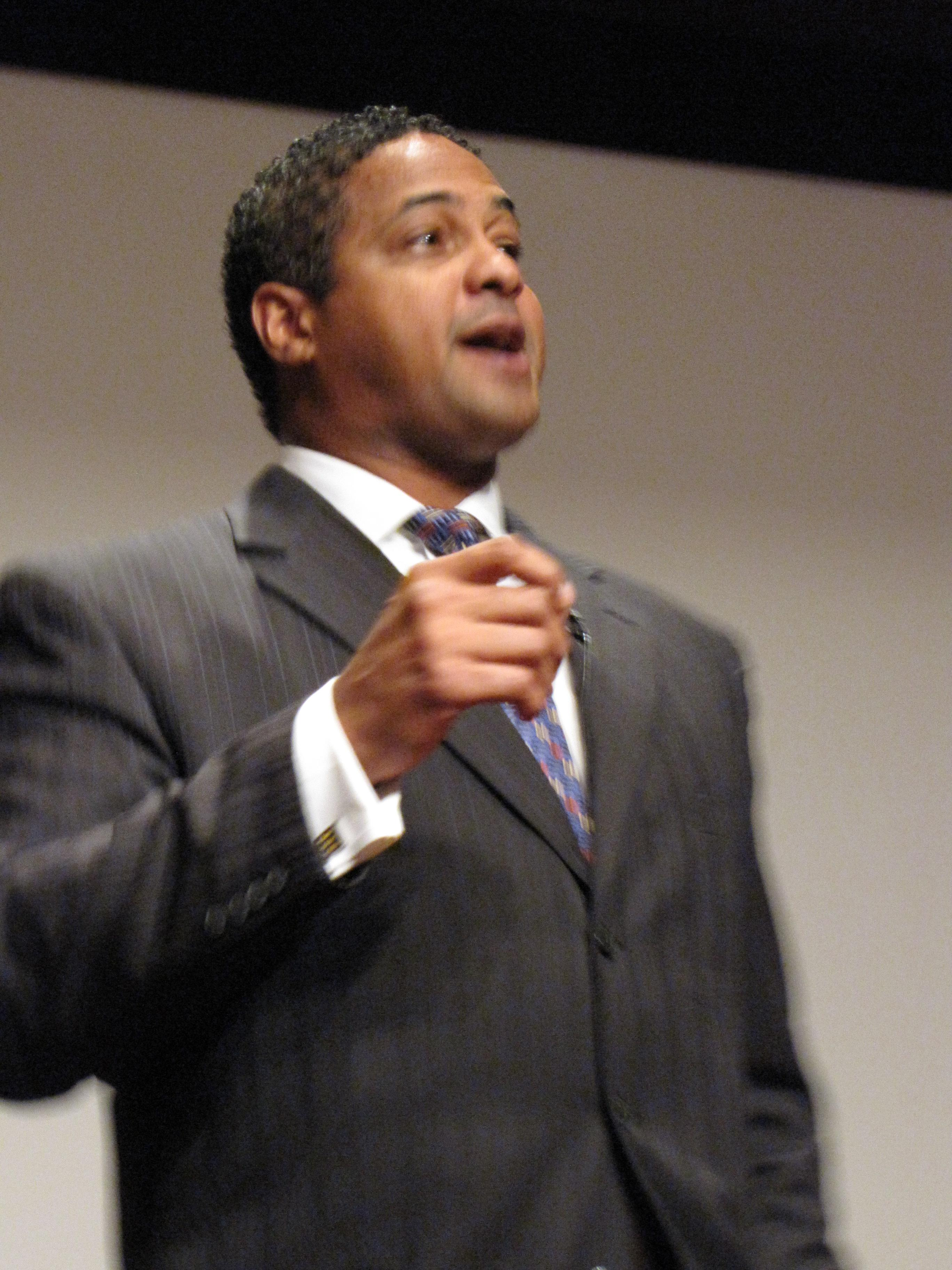

Despite playing for the Pittsburgh Pirates and being established in Pittsburgh for many years, Roberto Clemente insisted his wife Vera return to Puerto Rico so Roberto Jr. could be born there a day before his own birthday. The first seven years of Clemente's life were spent between Puerto Rico and Pittsburgh. His father died in a plane crash on December 31, 1972, while taking relief supplies to Nicaragua earthquake victims. After his father’s death, Roberto Jr. became the spokesperson for the family when his mother Vera was not available.

In 1978, he was chosen to carry the torch and light the Pavilion for the Pan Am Games. Clemente excelled in sports at the junior high and high school levels. He was captain of the volleyball team and participated in track and field and basketball, and was offered a spot on a professional basketball team. After high school, Clemente moved to Bradenton, Florida to attend a community college.

In 1984, he was spotted by a Philadelphia Phillies scout, and signed by the organization, joining their division-A team in 1985, the same year in which he made his debut in the Puerto Rican winter baseball league, with the Arecibo Wolves. A series of injuries prevented Clemente from making it to the major leagues. After playing two seasons with the Phillies, he joined the San Diego Padres after Sandy Alomar Sr. arranged it with the organization in 1986, but he had a knee injury during spring training and was not able to make the team. Clemente insisted on making the major leagues and after three knee surgeries in three years he traveled to Venezuela in 1989, where he homered on the first pitch thrown to him in over three years. He became a well-known player in Venezuela, but after signing a minor league contract with the Baltimore Orioles before the 1989 season, he suffered a career-ending injury to his back and had to retire from professional baseball.

Clemente returned to Puerto Rico and helped his mother make his father's dream a reality, the Roberto Clemente Sports City. In 1992, he brought Major League Baseball's RBI (Reviving Baseball in Inner Cities) program to Puerto Rico, which has won 10 RBI World Series championships. Clemente moved to Pittsburgh to establish the Roberto Clemente Foundation in 1993 to help bring to the RBI program where there was none. When Kevin McClatchy became the Pirates' new owner in 1995, the major league team embraced and promoted RBI Baseball.

In 1997 Clemente accepted an offer to broadcast New York Yankees games on television and radio, becoming a Spanish-language announcer for the Yankees on MSG Network, Telemundo, and WADO. WADO inaugurated a weekly talk show with Clemente Jr. as show host in 1997. By 1998, Roberto was splitting the duties as Spanish play by play announcer for the New York Yankees and earned three World Series rings with the 1998, 1999 and 2000 teams. Clemente added more broadcast duties by joining ESPN Deportes as a sideline reporter for the baseball post season and was part of the ESPN Family for another seven years as a color commentator. In 2001, Clemente hosted the Spanish version of MLB's network television show, Baseball Max, and by 2002, was conducting game interviews for ESPN Deportes Radio. Also in 2002, he was named honorary chairman for the Baseball Assistance Team's (BAT) annual fundraising dinner. He is known for his work with the American Diabetes Association.

In 2004, Clemente decided to complete his father's fatal trip with supplies. He joined forces with Project Club Clemente President Eliezer Rodriguez, but the tsunami in southeast Asia forced them to reschedule after Clemente decided to send the aid to where it was needed. In 2005, Clemente hosted a Saturday afternoon show on WFAN in New York City called The Latin Beat. This was his first English-language radio job, as he also became the first Latino host in the history of the station.

In 2013, Roberto became a member of the board for The National Hispanic Health Foundation because of his work in the forefront of new brain technology. He is currently the Ambassador for RC21x. Clemente was selected to serve as commissioner of President George W. Bush's South Lawn tee-ball League. He co-hosted the tee-ball tournament at Gracie Mansion with NYC Mayor Michael Bloomberg from 2006 to 2013.

In 2024, Roberto endorsed the republican candidate Donald Trump for President of the United States.
