= Statue of Roberto Clemente (New York City) =

Sculpture in the Bronx, New York

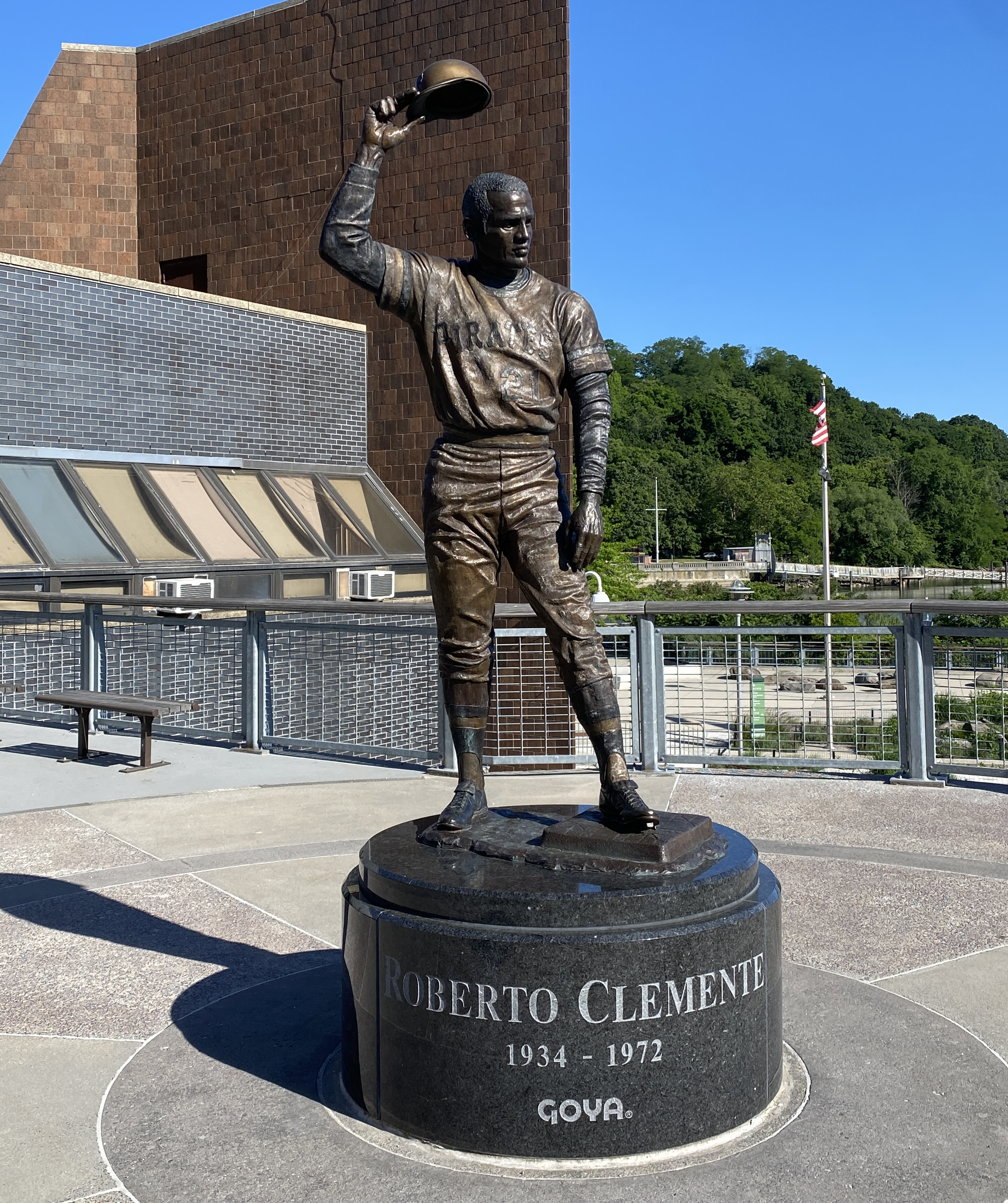
- Artist: Maritza Hernandez
- Year: 2013
- Medium: Bronze sculpture
- Subject: Roberto Clemente
- Location: Roberto Clemente State Park; The Bronx, New York City, U.S.; 40°51′15″N 73°55′15″W

In 2013, a statue of Baseball Hall of Fame outfielder Roberto Clemente was unveiled at Roberto Clemente State Park in Morris Heights, The Bronx, New York City. The statue was commissioned Goya Foods and was created by sculptor Maritza Hernandez. It was the first statue honoring a Puerto Rican to be unveiled in New York City.

== Appearance ==
The statue depicts Clemente doffing his baseball helmet after hitting his 3000th and final career hit, a double. It stands on four-foot base upon which there is an inscription of a quote by Clemente: "Any time you have an opportunity to make a difference in this world and you don’t, then you are wasting your time on Earth."

== History ==
Though best known for playing with the Pittsburgh Pirates, Clemente was a hero for the large Puerto Rican community in New York City. When Clemente signed with the Brooklyn Dodgers, before being drafted by the Pirates under the bonus rule he was signed under, he did so in part because of the large number of his countrymen living in the city.

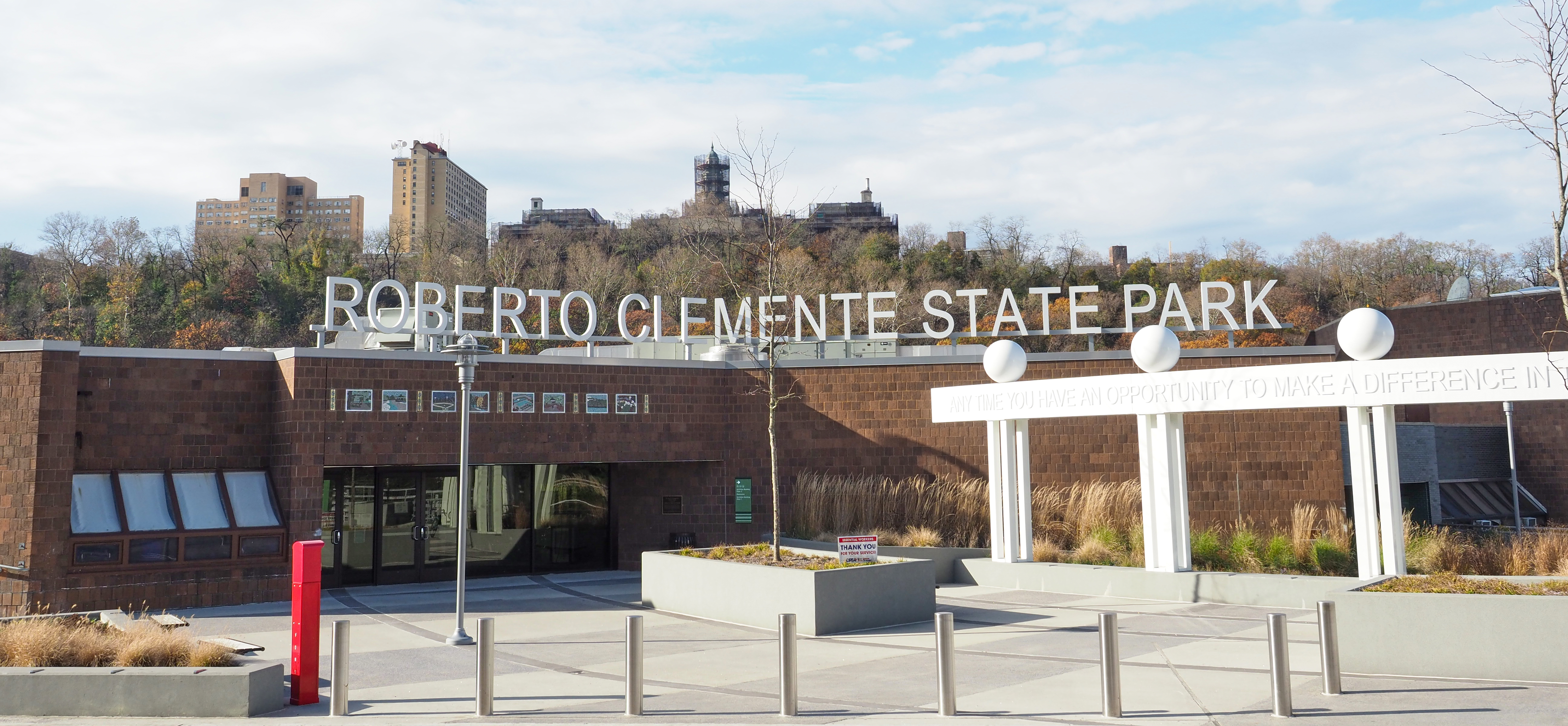
Roberto Clemente State Park, the park named for Clemente, where his statue was unveiled in 2013

After Clemente's death in a plane crash in 1972 and his election to the Baseball Hall of Fame in 1973, the first Latin American ever to be elected, the Harlem River State Park in the Bronx, the center of the Nuyorican community in New York City, was renamed to Roberto Clemente State Park in his honor. An annual "Roberto Clemente Week" is also held at the park.

Clemente's statue, created by Latin-American sculptor Martiza Hernandez, is the first statue honoring a Puerto Rican in New York City. Unveiled in 2013, forty years after his election to the Hall of Fame, it was sponsored by Goya Foods which had a connection with Clemente who had done Goya-sponsored baseball clinics in Puerto Rico. Cristobal Colon, a close friend of Clemente's and the man who drove him to the airport the night he died, had been a Goya executive in Puerto Rico. Bob Unanue, President of Goya Foods, was a baseball fan and agreed to sponsor the statue.

Amongst the attendees at the unveiling were Clemente's sons Luis and Roberto Jr., the latter of whom gave a speech in which he said: "For the children who use this park, who play here, this is a great way for them to see who the man was… They will see the statue and be able to learn about Roberto Clemente, not only the baseball player but the human being."

== See also ==
- Nuyorican
- Puerto Ricans in New York City
