= Roberto Clemente State Park =

Public park in the Bronx, New York

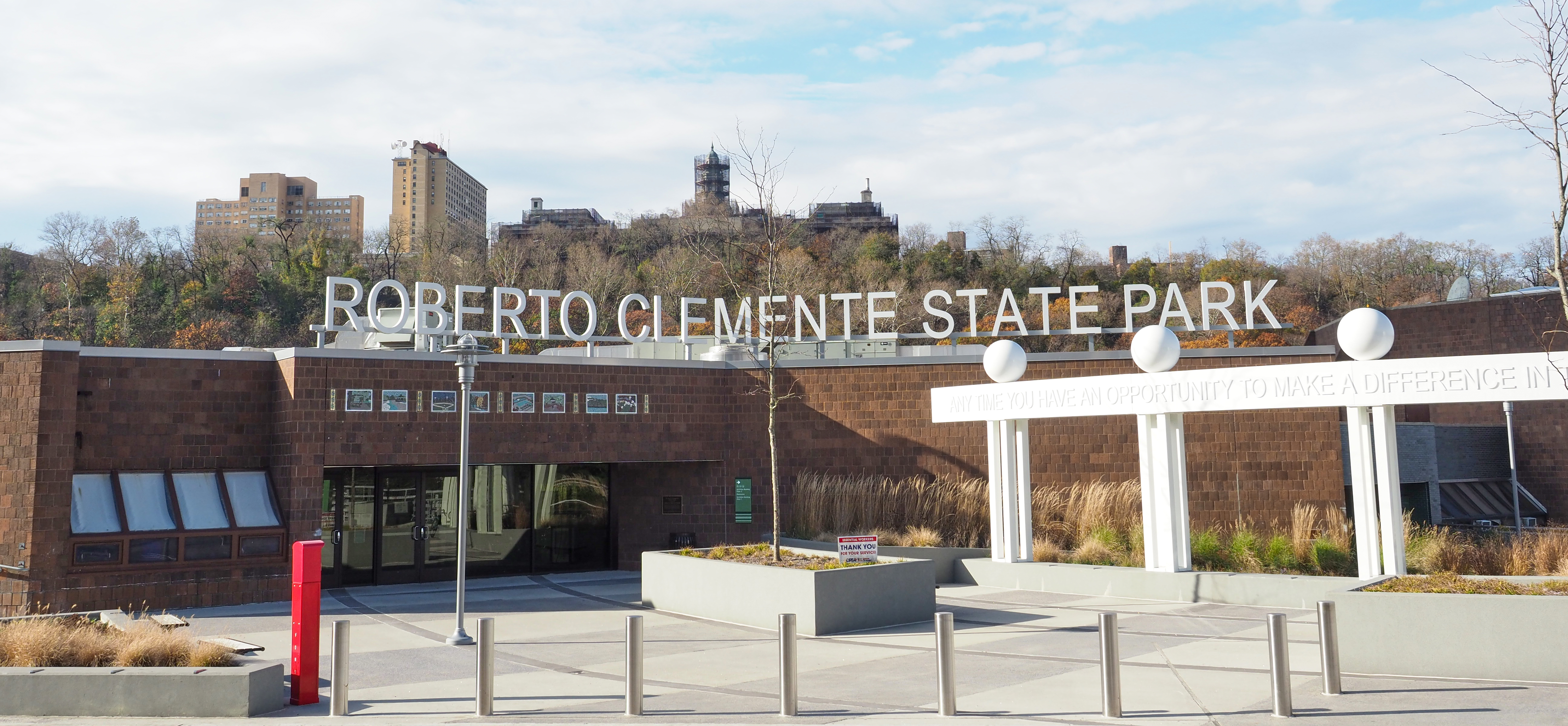
- Entrance to Roberto Clemente State Park

- Location within New York City
- Type: State park
- Location: The Bronx, New York City, NY, United States
- Coordinates: 40°51′18″N 73°55′12″W
- Area: 25 acres (10 ha)
- Created: 1973
- Operator: New York State Office of Parks, Recreation and Historic Preservation
- Visitors: 1,092,606 (in 2014)
- Public transit: Morris Heights

Roberto Clemente State Park is a 25-acre (10 ha) state park in Morris Heights, Bronx, New York City. The park is adjacent to the Harlem River, the Major Deegan Expressway (Interstate 87), and the Morris Heights station on Metro-North's Hudson Line.

== History ==
Roberto Clemente State Park, originally named Harlem River State Park, opened in 1973 and was the first New York state park established in an urban setting.

The park was renamed in 1974 for Roberto Clemente, the first Latino-American to be inducted into the Baseball Hall of Fame. Clemente was killed in an air crash while trying to assist relief efforts after the 1972 Nicaragua earthquake. In 2013, a statue of Clemente was unveiled in the park.

== Park description ==
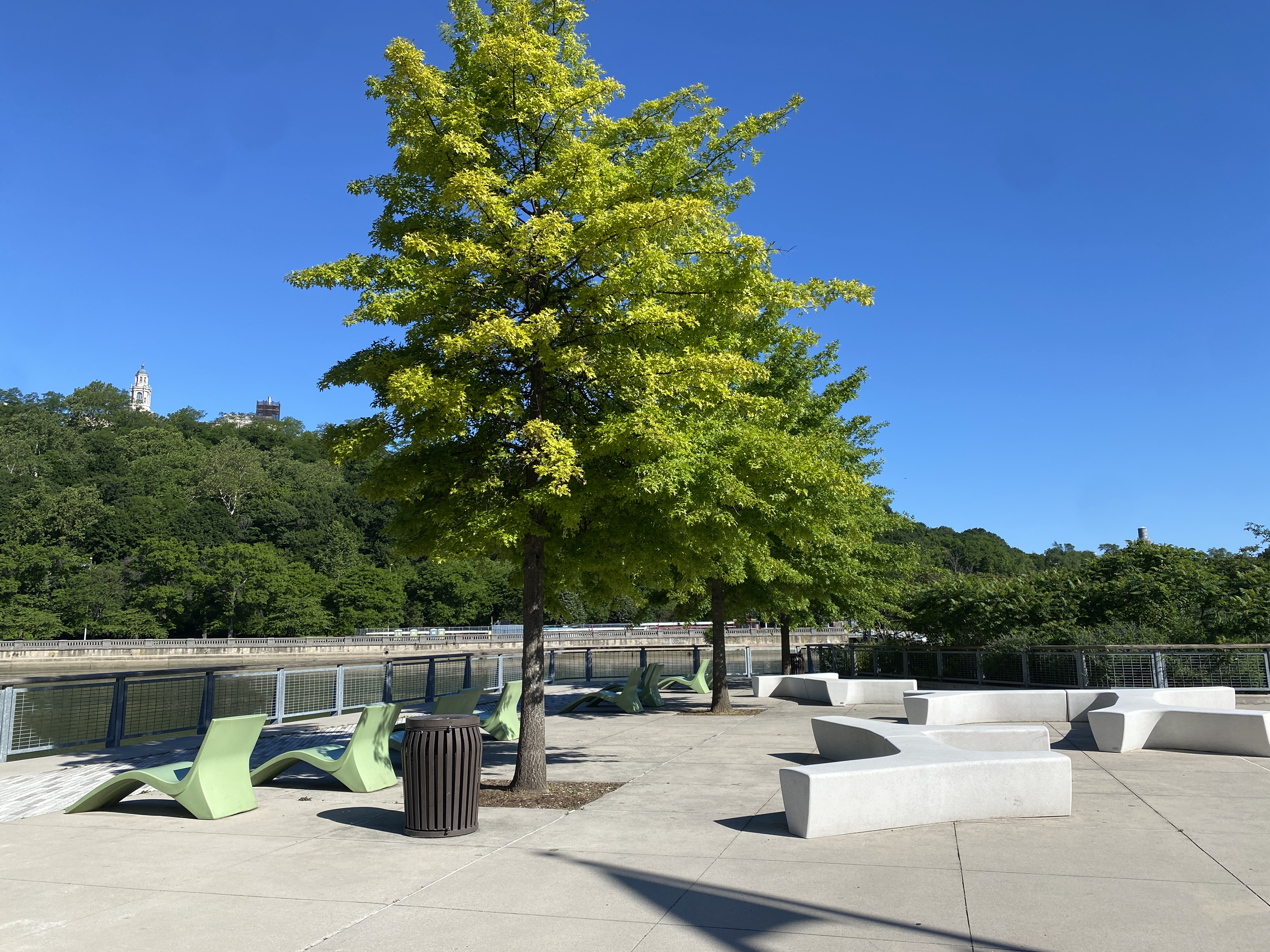
Roberto Clemente State Park Waterfront

Roberto Clemente State Park offers a recreation building, a swimming pool, picnic tables, a playground, recreation programs, ball fields and basketball courts, biking, and a waterfront esplanade. This park connects to Bridge Park to its south.

== See also ==
- List of New York state parks
