= Bridge Park (Bronx) =

Public park in the Bronx, New York

Coordinates: 40°50′51″N 73°55′36″W

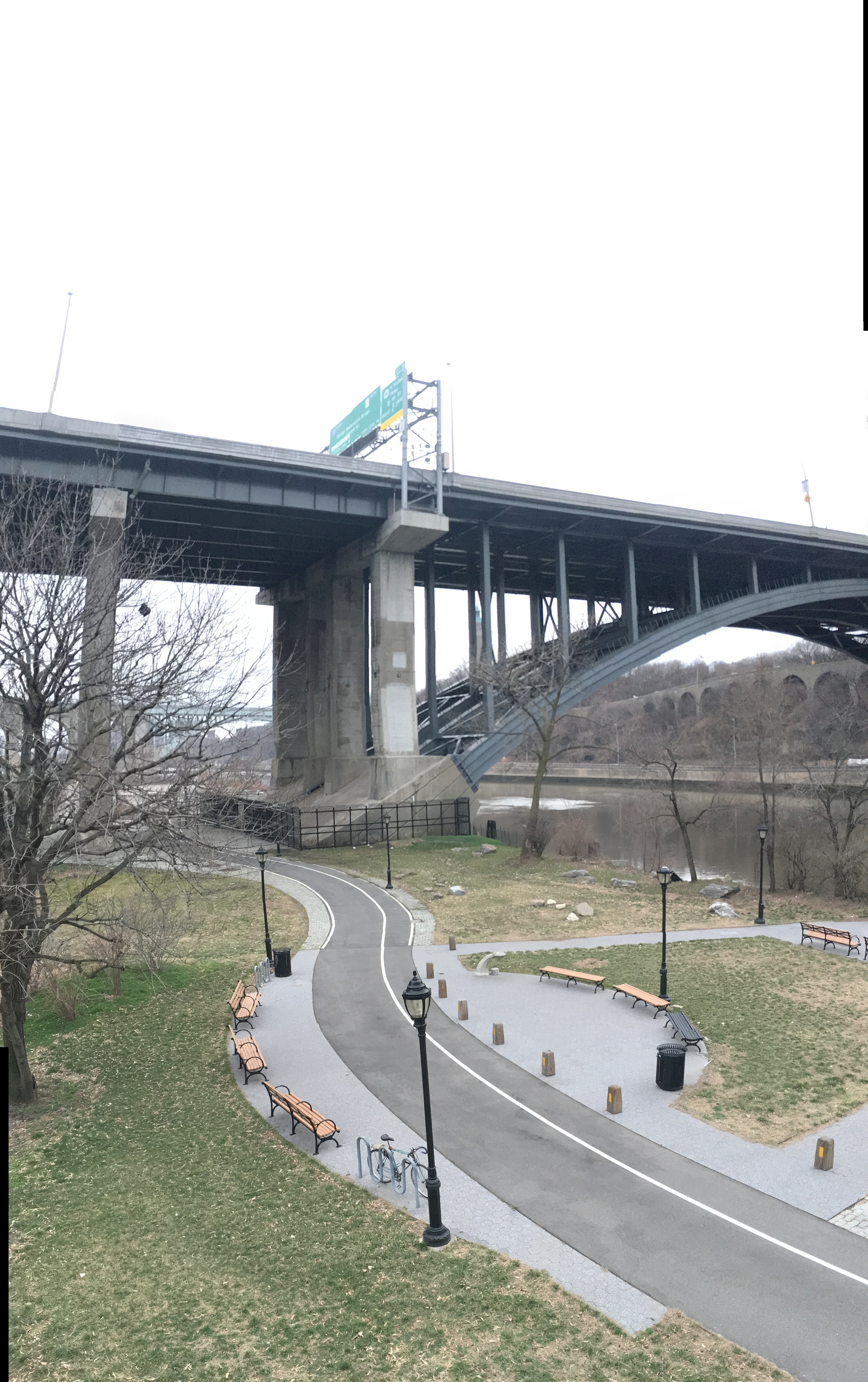
- Southern end of the park
- Interactive map of Bridge Park
- Type: Urban park
- Location: Morris Heights and Highbridge, Bronx, New York City
- Area: 7.16 acres (2.90 ha)
- Opened: 2015
- Operator: NYC Parks

Bridge Park is a park in the Bronx, New York, created as part of a larger vision of creating connected waterfront parks along both sides of the Harlem River. The park's name references its proximity to three large arch bridges linking Manhattan and the Bronx: Alexander Hamilton Bridge, Washington Bridge, and High Bridge.

== History ==
Land for this park was gradually acquired by the City of New York between 1884 and 2011. The oldest of the parcels was along the Bronx side of Washington Bridge, where winding trails and steps descended from the bridge's landing in the Morris Heights neighborhood to the Harlem River's shoreline. The bridge was conceived by Parks Commissioner Andrew Haswell Green. An early advocate of expanding the City of New York, he envisioned the bridge as symbolic of the unity between Manhattan and the Bronx. The bridge was completed in 1889 and was named after the country's first president on the centennial of his inauguration. The construction of Major Deegan Expressway (I-87) in 1939 and Cross-Bronx Expressway (I-95) in 1955 greatly reduced some of the parkland on the Harlem River shoreline in favor of highway ramps connecting Washington Bridge to the two highways.

Located on a narrow property between the water's edge and the Metro-North Railroad's Hudson Line, the park is located on a site that was originally an illegal dump and a dog pound. The area was difficult to access, and undeveloped until the City decided to develop unused waterfronts as linear parks connecting distant neighborhoods and providing opportunities to launch canoes and learn about wildlife living in Harlem River. In May 2015, the 0.5-mile (0.80 km) strip along the Bronx side of Harlem River opened to the public as Bridge Park. Bridge Park connects to Roberto Clemente State Park to its north.

== Current status ==
The master plan for Bridge Park includes passive and active recreational facilities and educational structures including a boathouse and canoe launch at the water's edge; a greenhouse, garden and picnic grove further inland, as well as a performance space and bike trails. Bridge Park's development is ongoing with community input on its design and acquisition of land to connect it with other parks on the Harlem River shoreline.
