= Statue of Roberto Clemente (Pittsburgh) =

Sculpture in Pittsburgh, Pennsylvania

Coordinates: 40°26′48.5″N 80°0′14.2″W

- Artist: Susan Wagner
- Year: 1994
- Medium: Bronze sculpture
- Subject: Roberto Clemente
- Location: PNC Park Pittsburgh, Pennsylvania, U.S.

In 1994, the Pittsburgh Pirates unveiled a 12-foot statue of Baseball Hall of Fame outfielder Roberto Clemente, just before the 1994 Major League Baseball All-Star Game which was hosted by the Pirates in Three Rivers Stadium.

== Information ==
The statue was created by Susan Wagner and depicts Clemente dropping his bat and running out of the batter's box. It was funded by donations from Pirates fans.

The base of the statue is made from black granite and stainless steel, with a baseball diamond set in the center and glass blocks which represent first, second and third base. Underneath each glass block is soil from Puerto Rico, Clemente's birthplace, and from Forbes Field and Three Rivers Stadium, former home ballparks for the Pittsburgh Pirates and where Clemente played his entire MLB career.

Around the diamond are 15 inscriptions set in steel which run counter-clockwise from home plate to third base, listing Clemente's career highlights. According to the Pirates, a space was left intentionally blank for a 16th inscription which remains empty as "a reflection of the incomplete circle of Roberto Clemente's life."

In 2001, the statue was moved to its current location outside PNC Park's centerfield gate.
