= Chip Lang =

American baseball player (born 1952)

- Pitcher
- Born: August 21, 1952 (age 72); Pittsburgh, Pennsylvania, U.S.
- Batted: Right Threw: Right

MLB debut
- September 8, 1975, for the Montreal Expos

Last MLB appearance
- October 3, 1976, for the Montreal Expos

MLB statistics
- Win–loss record: 1–3
- Earned run average: 4.36
- Strikeouts: 32
- Stats at Baseball Reference

Teams
- Montreal Expos (1975–1976)

Robert David "Chip" Lang (born August 21, 1952) is an American former Major League Baseball pitcher. Lang played for the Montreal Expos in 1975 and 1976.
