= Roberto Clemente =

Puerto Rican baseball player (1934–1972)

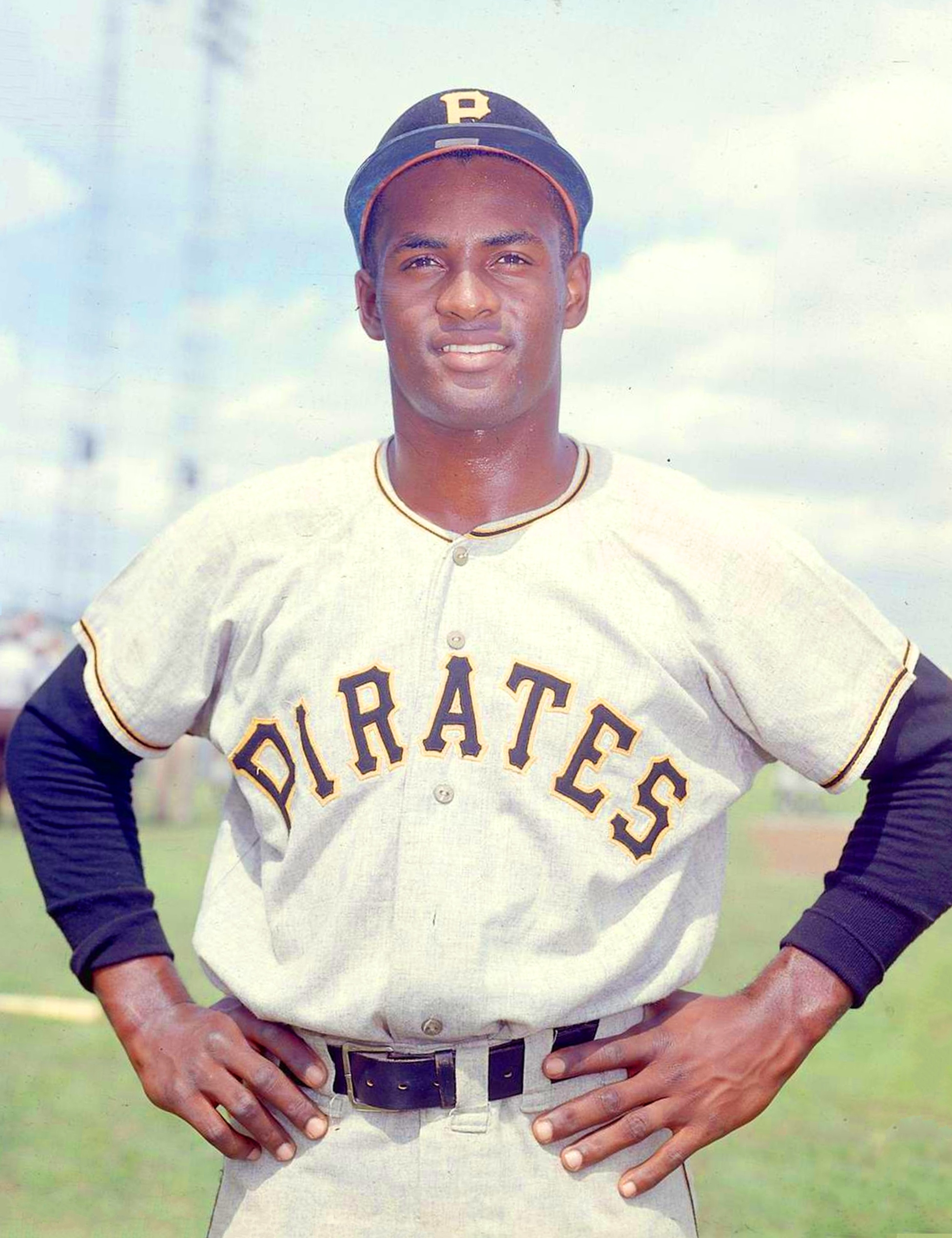
- Clemente with the Pirates in 1957
- Right fielder
- Born: August 18, 1934; San Antón, Carolina, Puerto Rico
- Died: December 31, 1972 (aged 38); Off the coast of Isla Verde, Puerto Rico
- Batted: Right Threw: Right

MLB debut
- April 17, 1955, for the Pittsburgh Pirates

Last MLB appearance
- October 3, 1972, for the Pittsburgh Pirates

MLB statistics
- Batting average: .317
- Hits: 3,000
- Home runs: 240
- Runs batted in: 1,305
- Stats at Baseball Reference

Teams
- Pittsburgh Pirates (1955–1972)

Career highlights and awards
- 15× All-Star (1960–1967, 1969–1972); 2× World Series champion (1960, 1971); NL MVP (1966); World Series MVP (1971); 12× Gold Glove Award (1961–1972); 4× NL batting champion (1961, 1964, 1965, 1967); Commissioner's Historic Achievement Award; Pittsburgh Pirates No. 21 retired; Pittsburgh Pirates Hall of Fame

Member of the National

Baseball Hall of Fame
- Induction: 1973
- Vote: 92.7%
- Election method: Special Election

Roberto Enrique Clemente Walker (Note: Both a 1955 interview with Orange Clemente and a 1994 interview with his wife Vera confirm that Clemente's full name includes the middle name, Enrique. The discrepancy in spelling – 1994's 'Enrique' vs. 1955's E-n-r-i-c-q-u-e (as allegedly spelled out for the interviewer by Clemente) – is presumably due to a misunderstanding on the part of the Post-Gazette's non-Spanish-speaking interviewer, likely mistaking the word "Si" for the letter c.) (Spanish pronunciation: [roˈβeɾto enˈrike kleˈmente (ɣ)walˈkeɾ]; August 18, 1934 – December 31, 1972) was a Puerto Rican professional baseball player who played 18 seasons in Major League Baseball (MLB) for the Pittsburgh Pirates, primarily as a right fielder. On December 31, 1972, Clemente was killed when his Douglas DC-7 airplane, which he had chartered for a flight to deliver emergency relief goods for the survivors of a massive earthquake in Nicaragua, crashed and plunged into the water off the coast of Isla Verde, Puerto Rico. He was 38 years old. After his death, the National Baseball Hall of Fame changed its rules so that a player who had been dead for at least six months would be eligible for entry. In 1973, Clemente was posthumously inducted, becoming the first Latino and Caribbean player and second of Hispanic descent (after Lefty Gomez in 1972) to be honored in the Hall of Fame. He is widely referred to as "the Great One."

Born in Carolina, Puerto Rico, Clemente was a track and field star and an Olympic hopeful in his youth before deciding to turn his full attention to baseball. His professional career began at the age of eighteen, with the Cangrejeros de Santurce of the Puerto Rican Professional Baseball League. He quickly attracted the attention of the Brooklyn Dodgers who signed him to a bonus of $10,000 ($120,491.45 in 2025). However, due to the bonus rule under which Clemente had signed and the Dodgers' decision to send him to the minor leagues, they lost Clemente to the Pittsburgh Pirates who drafted him after the 1954 season.

Clemente was an All-Star for 13 seasons, selected to 15 All-Star Games. He was the National League (NL) Most Valuable Player (MVP) in 1966, the NL batting leader in 1961, 1964, 1965, and 1967, and a Gold Glove Award winner for 12 consecutive seasons from 1961 through 1972. His batting average was over .300 for 13 seasons and he had 3,000 hits during his major league career. He also was a two-time World Series champion. Clemente was the first player from the Caribbean and Latin America to win a World Series as a starting position player (1960), to receive an NL MVP Award (1966), and to receive a World Series MVP Award (1971).

During the offseason, in addition to playing winter ball in Puerto Rico, Clemente was involved in charity work in Latin American and Caribbean countries. In 1972, he died in a plane crash at the age of 38 while en route to deliver aid to victims of the Nicaragua earthquake. The following season, the Pittsburgh Pirates retired his uniform number 21. In his honor, MLB renamed the Commissioner's Award, given to the player who "best exemplifies the game of baseball, sportsmanship, community involvement and the individual's contribution to his team", to the Roberto Clemente Award.

== Early life ==
Clemente was born on August 18, 1934, in Barrio San Antón in Carolina, Puerto Rico, to Luisa Walker and Melchor Clemente. He was the youngest of six siblings (three were from his mother's previous marriage). During Clemente's childhood, his father worked as a foreman for sugar cane crops located in the municipality in the northeastern part of the island. Because the family's resources were limited, Clemente and his brothers worked alongside his father in the fields, loading and unloading trucks.

Clemente had first shown interest in baseball early in life and often played against neighboring barrios. When he was fourteen, he was recruited by Roberto Marín to play softball with the Sello Rojo team after he was seen playing baseball in barrio San Antón. He was with the team two years as a shortstop.

Clemente's interest in baseball grew as he would watch games in Puerto Rico's winter baseball league as a kid. San Juan was a popular destination for barnstorming teams and players who wanted to continue playing in the winter months. Watching the games, Clemente was inspired by Monte Irvin, a right fielder for the Negro leagues' Newark Eagles.

He attended Julio Vizcarrondo High School in Carolina where he was a track and field star, participating in the high jump and javelin throw. Clemente was considered good enough to represent Puerto Rico at the Olympics. He later stated that throwing the javelin helped in strengthening his arm and with his footwork and release. Despite his all-around athletic skill, however, Clemente decided to focus on baseball and went on to join Puerto Rico's amateur league, playing for the Ferdinand Juncos team, which represented the municipality of Juncos.

== Professional career ==
=== Puerto Rican baseball (1952–1954) ===
Clemente's professional career began at age 18 when he accepted a contract from Pedrín Zorrilla with Cangrejeros de Santurce ("Crabbers"), a winter league team and franchise of the Puerto Rican Professional Baseball League (LBPPR). Clemente signed with the team on October 9, 1952. He was a bench player during his first season but was promoted to the Cangrejeros' starting lineup the following season. During this season he hit .288 as the team's leadoff hitter.

While Clemente was playing in the Puerto Rican League, the Brooklyn Dodgers offered him a contract of $15,000 — $10,000 bonus and $5,000 league minimum salary. Clemente signed with them on February 19, 1954.

=== Minor league baseball (1954) ===
At the time of Clemente's signing, the bonus rule implemented by MLB was still in effect. The rule stipulated that when a major league team signed a player to a contract with a signing bonus in excess of $4,000 ($58,000 today), the team was required to keep that player on their 25-man active roster for two full seasons and failure to comply with the rule would result in the team losing the rights to that player's contract, and the player would then be exposed to the waiver wire.

As Clemente's bonus was larger than $4,000, he was considered a bonus baby. However, the Dodgers decided against benching him for two years in the majors and decided to place him with the Montreal Royals, their International League Triple-A affiliate. While it is often believed that the Dodgers instructed manager Max Macon to use Clemente sparingly to prevent him from being drafted under the Rule 5 Draft, Macon himself denied it. Box scores also suggest that Macon platooned Clemente the same as he did with other outfielders.

Affected early on by both climate and language differences, Clemente received assistance from bilingual teammates such as infielder Chico Fernandez and pitchers Tommy Lasorda and Joe Black. (Note: To what extent Lasorda assisted Clemente is open to debate. Fellow Royals hurler Joe Black categorically denies Lasorda's characterization of Clemente as unable to "speak one word of English": "I saw him on the field and I said, 'Tommy, why did you tell that story?' He said, 'What do you mean?' I said, 'One: Clemente didn't hang out with you. Second: Clemente speaks English.' ... Puerto Rico, you know, is part of the United States. So, over there, youngsters do have the privilege of taking English in classrooms. He wouldn't give a speech like Shakespeare, but he knew how to order breakfast and eggs. He knew how to say, 'it's a good day,' 'let's play,' or 'why I don't play?' He could say, 'Let's go to the movies.'")

Black was the original target of the Pittsburgh Pirates' scouting trip to Richmond on June 1, 1954. Noticing Clemente in batting practice, Pirates scout Clyde Sukeforth made inquiries and soon learned about Clemente's status as an unprotected bonus baby. Twelve years later, manager Macon acknowledged that "we tried to sneak him through the draft, but it didn't work" but denied being instructed to not play Clemente, stating that the player needed time to develop and was struggling against Triple-A pitching. However, Pittsburgh noticed his raw talents; as Sukeforth recalled years later, "I knew then he'd be our first draft choice. I told Montreal manager Max Macon to take good care of 'our boy' and see that he didn't get hurt."

In 87 games with the Royals, Clemente hit .257 with two home runs. The first home run of his North American baseball career came on July 25, 1954; Clemente's extra inning, walk-off home run was hit in his first at-bat after entering the game as a defensive replacement. His only other minor league home run came on September 5. On his 20th birthday, August 18, he made a notable game-ending outfield assist, cutting down the potential tying run at the plate.

At the end of the season, Clemente returned to play for Santurce where one of his teammates was Willie Mays. While with the team, the Pirates made Clemente the first selection of the Rule 5 draft that took place on November 22, 1954.

=== Major League Baseball (1955–1972) ===
For all but the first seven weeks of his major league career, Clemente wore number 21, so chosen because his full name of Roberto Clemente Walker had that many letters. For his first few weeks, Clemente wore the number 13, as his teammate Earl Smith was wearing number 21. It was later reassigned to Clemente.

During the off-seasons (except the 1958–59, 1962–63, 1965–66, 1968–69, 1971–72, and 1972–73 seasons), Clemente played professionally for the Cangrejeros de Santurce, Criollos de Caguas, and Senadores de San Juan in the Liga de Béisbol Profesional de Puerto Rico, where he was considered a star. He sometimes managed the San Juan team.

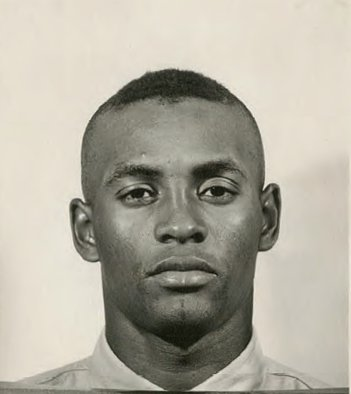
Clemente in the U.S. Marine Corps Reserve in September 1958

In September 1958, Clemente joined the United States Marine Corps Reserve. He served his six-month active duty commitment at Parris Island, South Carolina, Camp LeJeune in North Carolina, and Washington, D.C. At Parris Island, Clemente received recruit training with Platoon 346 of the 3rd Recruit Battalion. The rigorous Marine Corps training programs helped Clemente physically; he added strength by gaining ten pounds and said his back troubles, caused by being in a 1954 auto accident, disappeared as a result of the training. He was a private first class in the Marine Corps Reserve until September 1964.

Clemente would face racism throughout his major league career, particularly from journalists. Former Pirates teammate Bill Mazeroski wrote that some sports writers, "tried to make him look like an ass by getting him to say controversial things and then they wrote how the Puerto Rican hot dog was popping off again." The language barrier between Clemente and the American journalists created a divide which led Clemente to be distrustful of the media. Mazeroski wrote that, "writers who couldn't speak three words of Spanish tried to make him look silly, but he's an intelligent man who knows people and knows the game." Clemente's disagreements with the media were worsened by his open expression of anger at the continued discrimination in baseball. His outspoken nature earned him a reputation for being hot-tempered that followed him through his career.

==== Early years ====
The Pirates struggled through several difficult seasons through the 1950s. They did have a winning season in 1958, their first since 1948.

Clemente debuted with the Pirates on April 17, 1955, wearing uniform number 13, in the first game of a doubleheader against the Brooklyn Dodgers. Early in his career with the Pirates, he was frustrated by racial and ethnic tensions, with sniping by the local media and some teammates. Clemente responded to this by saying "I don't believe in color." He said that, during his upbringing, he was taught never to discriminate against someone based on ethnicity.

Clemente was at a double disadvantage, as he was a Latin American and Caribbean player whose first language was Spanish and was of African descent. Clemente's hometown newspaper, the San Juan Star wrote that, "Clemente is a black Puerto Rican. That makes him doubly dubious. His native tongue is foreign to button-down America, and so is his color." The year before, the Pirates had hired Curt Roberts, their first African-American player. They were the fifth team in the NL and ninth in the major leagues to do so, seven years after Jackie Robinson broke baseball's color line by joining the Dodgers. When Clemente arrived in Pittsburgh, Roberts befriended him and helped him adjust to life in the major league, as well as in the Pittsburgh area.

During his rookie season, Clemente had to sit out several games, as he had suffered a lower back injury in Puerto Rico the previous winter. A speeding, drunk driver rammed into his car at an intersection. He finished his rookie season with a .255 batting average, despite trouble hitting certain types of pitches. His defensive skills were highlighted during this season.

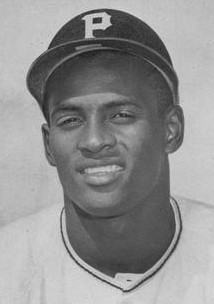
Clemente in 1957

The following season, on July 25, 1956, at Forbes Field, Clemente erased a three-run, ninth-inning deficit against the Chicago Cubs with a bases-clearing inside-the-park home run off pitcher Jim Brosnan, thus becoming the first—and, as yet, only—player in modern Major League history (since 1900) to hit a documented walk-off, inside-the-park grand slam. While rounding third, Clemente ran through a stop sign from Pirates manager Bobby Bragan, a decision which infuriated Brosnan. In the October 24, 1960, edition of Life magazine, Brosnan wrote that Clemente's heroics, "excited the fans, startled the manager, shocked me and disgusted my club." After the game, Bragan announced that Clemente would not be fined the $25 that was the standard punishment for a player who missed a sign. Pittsburgh-based sportswriter John Steigerwald said that a walk-off, inside-the-park grand slam, "may have been done only once in the history of baseball."

Clemente was still fulfilling his Marine Corps Reserve duty during spring of 1959 and set to be released from Camp Lejeune until April 4. A Pennsylvania state senator, John M. Walker, wrote to US Senator Hugh Scott requesting an early release on March 4 so Clemente could join the team for spring training.

==== Stardom ====
Early in the 1960 season, Clemente led the league with a .353 batting average, and the 14 extra-base hits and 25 RBIs recorded in May alone resulted in Clemente's selection as the National League's Player of the Month. His batting average would remain above the .300 mark throughout the course of the campaign. On August 5 at Forbes Field, Clemente crashed into the right-field wall while making a pivotal play, depriving San Francisco's Willie Mays of a leadoff, extra-base hit in a game eventually won by Pittsburgh, 1–0. The resulting injury necessitated five stitches to the chin and a five-game layoff for Clemente, while the catch itself was described by Giants beat writer Bob Stevens as "rank[ing] with the greatest of all time, as well as one of the most frightening to watch and painful to make." The Pirates compiled a 95–59 record during the regular season, winning the NL pennant, and defeated the New York Yankees in a seven-game World Series. Clemente batted .310 in the series, hitting safely at least once in every game. His .314 batting average, 16 home runs, and defensive playing during the course of the season had earned him his first spot on the NL All-Star roster as a reserve player, and he replaced Hank Aaron in right field during the 7th and 8th innings in the second All-Star game held that season (two All-Star games were held each season from 1959 through 1962).

During spring training in 1961, following advice from Pirates' batting coach George Sisler, Clemente tried to modify his batting technique by using a heavier bat to slow the speed of his swing. During the 1961 season, Clemente was named the starting NL right fielder for the first of two All-Star games and went 2 for 4; he hit a triple on his first at-bat and scored the team's first run, then drove in the second with a sacrifice fly. With the AL ahead 4–3 in the 10th inning, he teamed with fellow future HOFers Hank Aaron, Willie Mays, and Frank Robinson to engineer a come-from-behind 5–4 NL victory, culminating in Clemente's walk-off single off knuckleballer Hoyt Wilhelm. Clemente started again in right field for the second All-Star game held that season and was 0 for 2, flying and grounding out in the 2nd and 4th innings. That season he received his first Gold Glove Award.

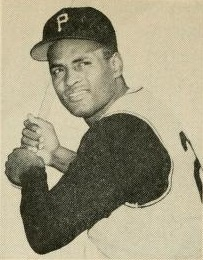
Clemente in 1962

Following the 1961 season, he traveled to Puerto Rico along with Orlando Cepeda, who was a native of Ponce. When both players arrived, they were received by 18,000 people. During this time, he was also involved in managing the Senadores de San Juan of the Puerto Rican League, as well as playing with the team during the major league off-season. During the course of the winter league, Clemente injured his thigh while doing some work at home but wanted to participate in the league's all-star game. He pinch-hit in the game and got a single, but experienced a complication of his injury as a result, and had to undergo surgery shortly after being carried off the playing field. This condition limited his role with the Pirates in the first half of the 1965 season, during which he batted .257. Although he was inactive for many games, when he returned to the regular starting lineup, he got hits in 33 out of 34 games and his batting average climbed up to .340. He participated as a pinch hitter and replaced Willie Stargell playing left field during the All-Star Game on July 15.

Clemente was an All-Star every season he played in the 1960s other than 1968—the only year in his career after 1959 in which he failed to hit above .300—and a Gold Glove winner for each of his final 12 seasons, beginning in 1961. He won the NL batting title four times: 1961, 1964, 1965, and 1967, and won the league's MVP Award in 1966, hitting .317 with a career-high 29 home runs and 119 RBIs. In 1967, Clemente registered a career-high .357 batting average, hit 23 home runs, and batted in 110 runs. Following that season, in an informal poll conducted by Sport Magazine at baseball's Winter Meetings, a plurality of major league GMs declared Clemente "the best player in baseball today," edging out AL Triple Crown winner Carl Yastrzemski by a margin of 8 to 6, with one vote each going to Hank Aaron, Bob Gibson, Bill Freehan and Ron Santo. He had the most hits for all players in the 1960s with 1,877.

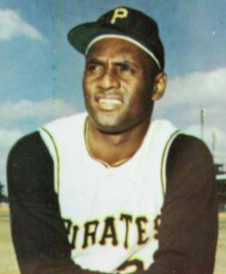
Clemente in 1966

In an effort to make him seem more American, sportswriters started calling him "Bob" or "Bobby". His baseball cards even listed him as "Bob Clemente", a practice that persisted through to 1969. He disliked the practice, which he felt was disrespectful to his Puerto Rican and Latino heritage. Clemente would correct reporters who referred to him as "Bob" during post-game interviews, but the issue continued throughout the 1960s.

==== Final seasons ====
The 1970 season was the last one that the Pirates played at Forbes Field before moving to Three Rivers Stadium; for Clemente, abandoning this stadium was an emotional situation. The Pirates' final game at Forbes Field occurred on June 28, 1970. That day, Clemente said that it was hard to play in a different field, saying, "I spent half my life there." The night of July 24, 1970, was declared "Roberto Clemente Night"; on this day, several Puerto Rican fans traveled to Three Rivers Stadium and cheered Clemente while wearing traditional Puerto Rican attire. A ceremony to honor Clemente took place, during which he received a scroll with 300,000 signatures compiled in Puerto Rico, and several thousands of dollars were donated to charity work following Clemente's request.

During the 1970 season, Clemente compiled a .352 batting average; the Pirates won the NL East pennant but were subsequently eliminated by the Cincinnati Reds. During the offseason, Roberto Clemente experienced some tense situations while he was working as manager of the Senadores and when his father, Melchor Clemente, experienced medical problems and underwent surgery.

In the 1971 season, the Pirates won the NL East, defeated the San Francisco Giants in four games to win the NL pennant, and faced the Baltimore Orioles in the World Series. Baltimore had won 101 games (third season in row with 100+ wins) and swept the American League Championship Series, both for the third consecutive year, and were the defending World Series champions. The Orioles won the first two games in the series, but Pittsburgh won the championship in seven games. This marked the second occasion that Clemente helped win a World Series for the Pirates. Over the course of the series, Clemente had a .414 batting average (12 hits in 29 at-bats), performed well defensively, and hit a solo home run in the deciding 2–1 seventh game victory. Following the conclusion of the season, he received the World Series Most Valuable Player Award.

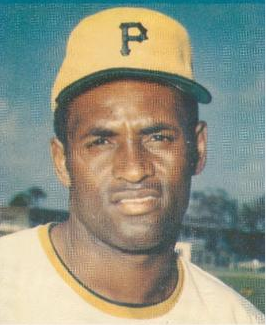
Clemente in 1972

Although he was frustrated and struggling with injuries, Clemente played in 102 games and hit .312 during the 1972 season. He also made the annual NL All-Star roster for the fifteenth (15th) time (he played in 14/15 All-Star games) and won his twelfth consecutive Gold Glove.

On September 30, he hit a double in the fourth inning off Jon Matlack of the New York Mets at Three Rivers Stadium for his 3,000th. It was his last regular season at-bat of his career. By playing in right field in one more regular season game, on October 3, Clemente tied Honus Wagner's record for games played as a Pittsburgh Pirate, with 2,433 games played. In the NL playoffs that season, he batted .235 as he went 4 for 17. His last game was October 11, 1972, at Cincinnati's Riverfront Stadium in the fifth and final game of the 1972 NLCS, won by the Reds in the bottom of the 9th inning. Clemente had his final hit (single) in the 1st inning; his final plate appearance was an intentional walk in the 8th inning. He and Bill Mazeroski were the last Pirate players remaining from the 1960 World Series championship team.

== Charity work and death ==
Clemente spent much of his time during the off-season involved in charity work. One of the projects he was most invested in was creating a sports center for disadvantaged youth in Puerto Rico. In 1967, Clemente told reporters, "The biggest thing I want to do is for the youths... for the kids. When I am ready to quit baseball I will have my sports center... to me it will be the most important thing in the world." The center was so important to Clemente that shortly before recording his 3,000th hit, he told his manager Danny Murtaugh that the most important moment of his life would not be the hit, but the creation of the center. The project stalled after his death until his widow, Vera Clemente, attained corporate assistance for the center in the late 1980s. Now, many professional Puerto Rican players have trained at the center.

Clemente visited Managua, the capital city of Nicaragua, in late 1972, while managing the Puerto Rico national baseball team at the 1972 Amateur World Series. When Managua was affected by a massive earthquake three weeks later, on December 23, 1972, Clemente immediately set to work arranging emergency relief flights. He soon learned, however, that the aid packages on the first three flights had been diverted by corrupt officials of the Somoza government, never reaching victims of the quake. He decided to accompany the fourth relief flight, hoping that his presence would ensure that the aid would be delivered to the survivors.

The airplane which he chartered for the New Year's Eve flight, a Douglas DC-7 cargo plane, had a history of mechanical problems and it also had an insufficient number of flight personnel (the flight was missing a flight engineer and a copilot), and it was also overloaded by 4,200 pounds (1,900 kg). It crashed into the Atlantic Ocean off the coast of Isla Verde, Puerto Rico immediately after takeoff on December 31, 1972, due to engine failure.

A search and rescue effort was immediately launched, led by the USCGC Sagebrush. A few days after the crash, the body of the pilot and part of the fuselage of the plane were found. An empty flight case which apparently belonged to Clemente was the only personal item of his which was recovered from the plane. Clemente's teammate and close friend Manny Sanguillén was the only member of the Pirates who did not attend Roberto's memorial service. Instead, the Pirates catcher chose to dive into the waters where Clemente's plane had crashed in an effort to find his teammate. The bodies of Clemente and three others who were also on the four-engine plane were never recovered.

Montreal Expos pitcher Tom Walker, then playing winter league ball in Puerto Rico, had helped him load the plane. Because Clemente wanted Walker, who was single, to go and enjoy New Year's Eve, Clemente told him not to join him on the flight. A few hours later, Walker returned to his condo and discovered that the plane carrying Clemente had crashed.

Immediately following Clemente's death, a relief-aid organization for the victims of the Nicaraguan earthquake was created in his name. President Richard Nixon was one of the most prominent contributors to Roberto Clemente Memorial Fund. Shortly after the inception of the fund, donations grew to $350,000.

In an interview for the ESPN documentary series SportsCentury in 2002, Clemente's widow Vera mentioned that Clemente had told her several times that he thought he was going to die young. Indeed, while he was being asked when he would get his 3,000th career hit by broadcaster and future fellow Hall of Famer Richie Ashburn in July 1971 during the All-Star Game activities, Clemente's response was "Well, uh, you never know. I, I, uh, if I'm alive, like I said before, you never know because God tells you how long you're going to be here. So you never know what can happen tomorrow."

== Career overall ==
At the time of his death, Clemente had established several records with the Pirates, including most triples in a single game (three) and hits in two consecutive games (ten). He won 12 Gold Glove Awards and shares the record of most won among outfielders with Willie Mays.

Clemente was an All-Star for 13 seasons, selected to 15 All-Star Games. (Note: Major League Baseball held two All-Star Games for the years from 1959 to 1962.) He won the NL MVP Award in 1966, and was named NL Player of the Month Award three times (May 1960, May 1967, July 1969). Clemente led the Pirates to two World Series titles, being named World Series MVP in 1971.

Clemente had two three-home run games in his career, as well as eight five-hit games in MLB.

Category	G	BA	AB	R	H	2B	3B	HR	RBI	SB	CS	BB	SO	OBP	SLG	OPS	E	A	PO	FLD%	Ref.
Total	2,433	.317	9,454	1,416	3,000	440	166	240	1,305	83	46	621	1,230	.359	.475	.834	142	269	4,796	.972	

== Honors and legacy ==
Since the high point of his playing career, Clemente has been widely referred to as "the Great One", a nickname coined by sportscaster Bob Prince.

In 1973, President Richard Nixon posthumously honored Clemente with the Presidential Citizens Medal. That same day, Congress honored Clemente with the Congressional Gold Medal. In 2003, President George W. Bush awarded Clemente the Presidential Medal of Freedom.

Clemente is an iconic sports figure in Puerto Rico, widely revered by his people. The Coliseo Roberto Clemente, opened in 1973 in San Juan, and Estadio Roberto Clemente, opened in 2000 in Carolina, are both named in his honor. In 2012, the Puerto Rico Professional Baseball League (LBPPR) was renamed Liga de Béisbol Profesional Roberto Clemente, the number 21 was also permanently retired. In 2022, the government of Puerto Rico granted Clemente the formal recognition of prócer (national hero).

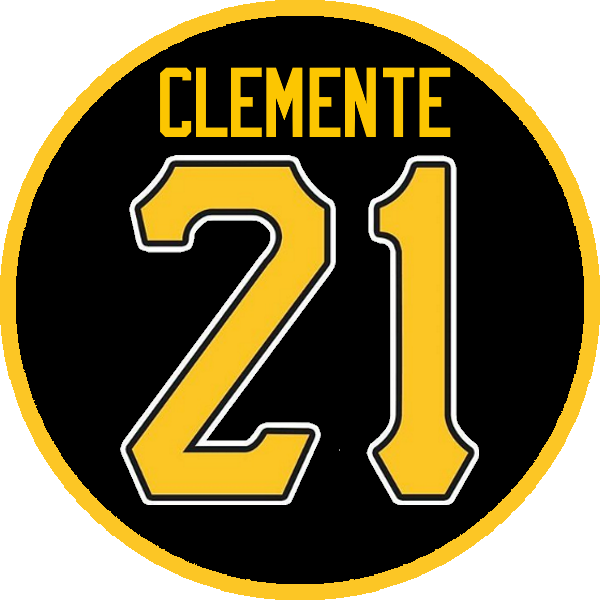
Roberto Clemente's number 21 was retired by the Pittsburgh Pirates in 1973.

On March 20, 1973, the Baseball Writers' Association of America held a special election for the Baseball Hall of Fame. They voted to waive the waiting period for Clemente, due to the circumstances of his death, and posthumously elected him for induction into the Hall of Fame, giving him 393 out of 424 available votes, for 92.7% of the votes. (Note: Clemente's Hall of Fame plaque originally had his name as "Roberto Walker Clemente" instead of the proper Spanish format "Roberto Clemente Walker"; the plaque was recast in 2000 to correct the error. Both plaques are currently on display in the Hall of Fame, the new one in the plaque gallery and the original in the “sandlot kids clubhouse” area.) In 2003, he was inducted into the United States Marine Corps Sports Hall of Fame. He was named to Major League Baseball's Latino Legends Team in 2005. In 2007, Clemente was selected for the All Time Rawlings Gold Glove Team for the 50th anniversary of the creation of the Gold Glove Award. Clemente was elected to the Hispanic Heritage Baseball Museum Hall of Fame in 2010, and the Caribbean Baseball Hall of Fame in 2015.

Clemente's number 21 was retired by the Pittsburgh Pirates on April 6, 1973, a few weeks after his election to the Hall of Fame. There have been calls for MLB to retire number 21 league-wide, as was done with Jackie Robinson's number 42 in 1997, but the sentiment has been opposed by the Robinson family. In 1973, Major League Baseball renamed the Commissioner's Award to the Roberto Clemente Award. It has been awarded every year to a player with outstanding baseball playing skills who is personally involved in community work. A trophy and a donation check for a charity of the player's choice are presented annually at the World Series. In 2002, 30 years after his death, Major League Baseball proclaimed September 15 as "Roberto Clemente Day".

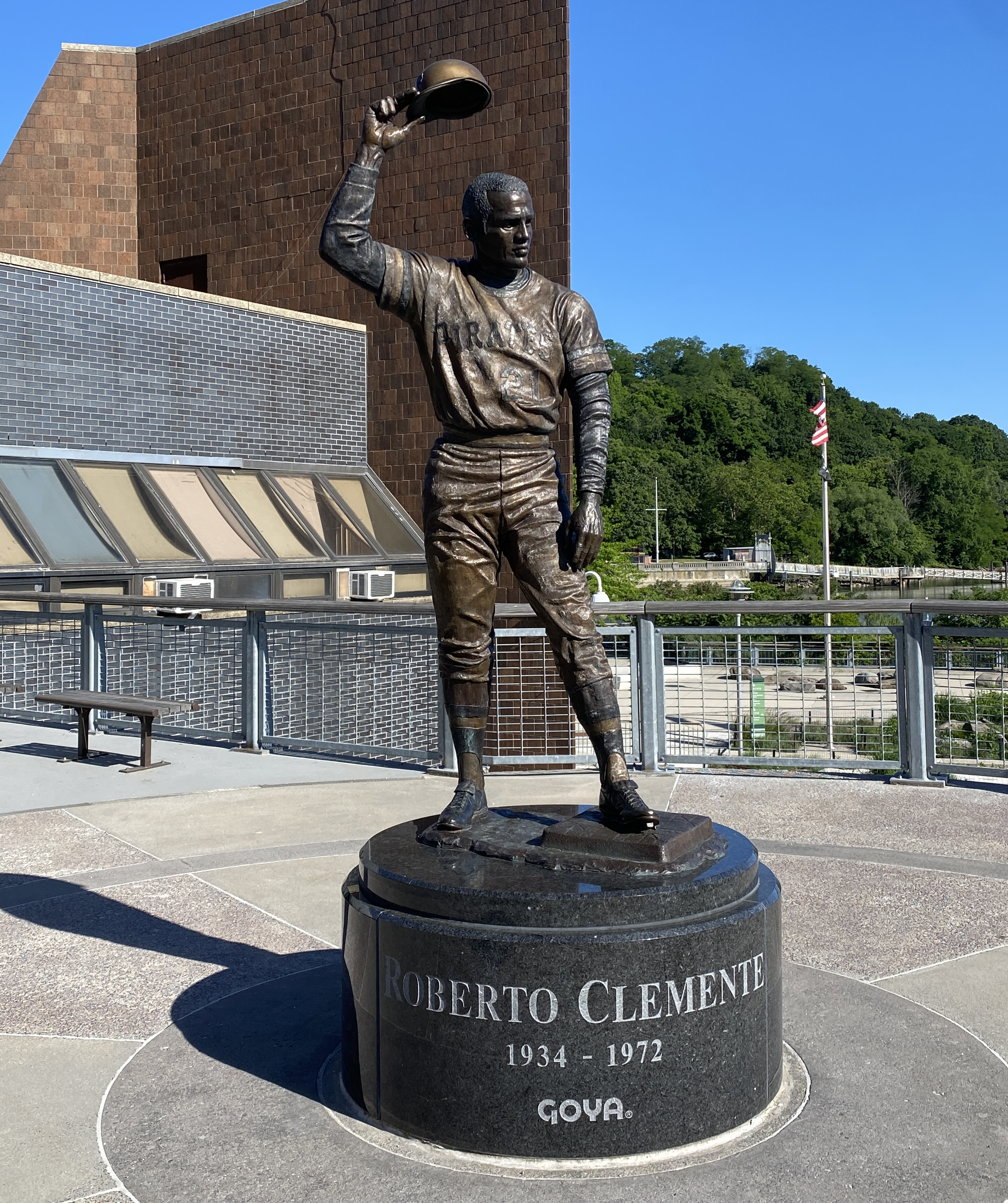
Statue of Roberto Clemente in Roberto Clemente State Park

In 1974, the Harlem River State Park in Morris Heights, The Bronx, New York City, was renamed Roberto Clemente State Park in his honor. In 2013, forty years after his election to the Hall of Fame, a statue was unveiled at the park. It was the first statue honoring a Puerto Rican to be unveiled in New York City. Near the old Forbes Field where Clemente began his major league career, the city of Pittsburgh renamed a street in his honor. At Pirate City, the Pirates spring training home in Bradenton, Florida, a section of 27th Street East is named Roberto Clemente Memorial Highway. Over a dozen schools in the United States have been named after Clemente, including the Roberto Clemente Community Academy in Chicago, and the Roberto Clemente Charter School in Allentown, Pennsylvania.

The United States Postal Service issued a Roberto Clemente postal stamp on August 17, 1984. The stamp was designed by Juan Lopez-Bonilla and shows Clemente wearing a Pittsburgh Pirates baseball cap with a Puerto Rican flag in the background. The Pirates originally erected a statue in memory of Clemente at Three Rivers Stadium, just before the 1994 Major League Baseball All-Star Game. It has since been moved to PNC Park when it opened in 2001, and stands outside the park's centerfield gates.

In 1999, Clemente was ranked number 20 on The Sporting News list of the 100 Greatest Baseball Players, the highest-ranking Latin American and Caribbean player on the list. Later that year, he was nominated as a finalist for the Major League Baseball All-Century Team. In 2020, The Athletic ranked Clemente at number 40 on its "Baseball 100" list, complied by sportswriter Joe Posnanski.

In 2023, U.S. Representative Adriano Espaillat introduced a bill in the U.S. Congress to authorize a United States commemorative coin commemorating Clemente. If the bill passes, the U.S. Treasury Department will design a Clemente coin. The bill passed the U.S. House with strong bipartisan support in 2024. However, because the U.S. Senate did not pass it before the session concluded, the bill expired. In 2025, Espaillat co-sponsored the reintroduction of the bill to the Congress. The legislation has been referred to the House Committee on Financial Services, and is awaiting a vote to head back to the House floor.

== Personal life ==
Clemente was married on November 14, 1964, to Vera Zabala at San Fernando Church in Carolina. The couple had three children: Roberto (often referred to as "Roberto Jr."), born in 1965; Luis Roberto, born in 1966; and Roberto Enrique, born in 1969. Vera Clemente died on November 16, 2019, aged 78.

Clemente was a devout Catholic. In the 2010s, there was an initiative to have him canonized by the Catholic Church.

Clemente's older brother Justino visited the Baseball Hall of Fame, and provided insight to the language barrier and racism Roberto faced. Justino died in March 2025 at the age of 97.

== See also ==
- List of Afro-Latinos
- List of Gold Glove Award winners at outfield
- List of baseball players who died during their careers
- List of Major League Baseball batting champions
- List of Major League Baseball annual triples leaders
- List of Major League Baseball career doubles leaders
- List of Major League Baseball career home run leaders
- List of Major League Baseball career batting average leaders
- List of Major League Baseball career hits leaders
- List of Major League Baseball career extra base hits leaders
- List of Major League Baseball career runs batted in leaders
- List of Major League Baseball career runs scored leaders
- List of Major League Baseball career total bases leaders
- List of Major League Baseball career triples leaders
- List of Major League Baseball players from Puerto Rico
- List of Major League Baseball players who spent their entire career with one franchise
- List of Major League Baseball ultimate grand slams
- List of Puerto Rican Presidential Citizens Medal recipients
- List of Puerto Rican Presidential Medal of Freedom recipients

== Notes ==
Awards and achievements
Preceded by Eddie Mathews; Pete Rose; Ron Santo	Major League Player of the Month; May 1960; May 1967; July 1969	Succeeded by Lindy McDaniel; Hank Aaron; Willie Davis
