= 1972 Puerto Rico DC-7 crash =

Aviation accident

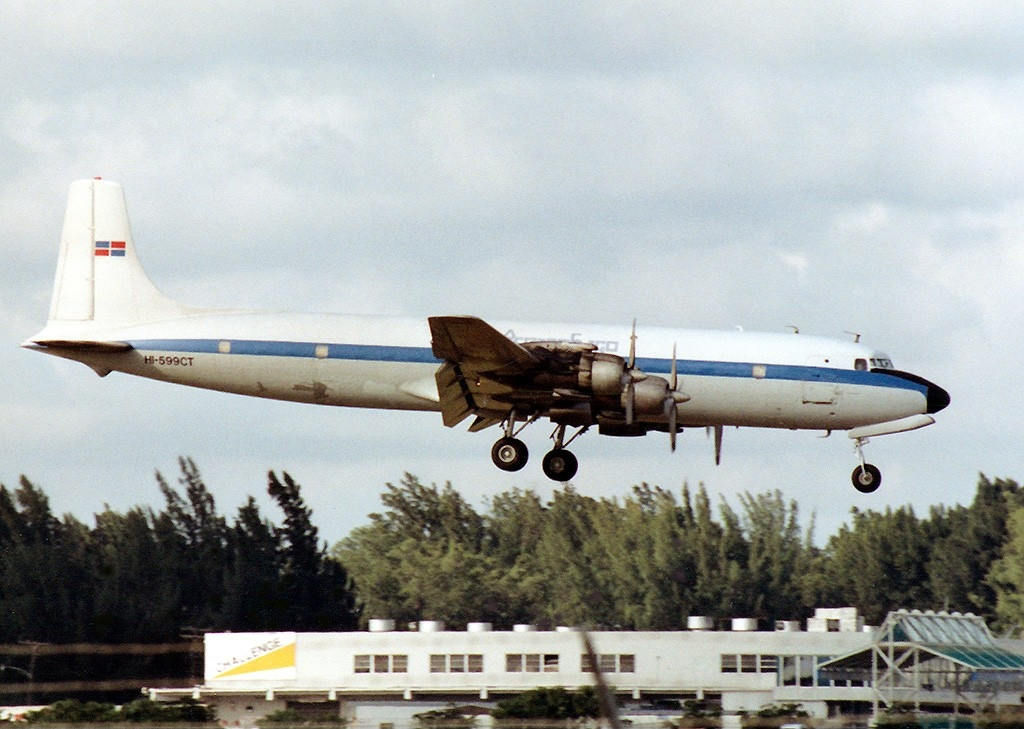
- A DC-7CF similar to the aircraft that crashed

Accident
- Date: 31 December 1972; 53 years, 10 months ago
- Summary: Single engine failure on takeoff
- Site: Piñones, near Isla Verde; 18°27′45″N 65°57′30″W

Aircraft
- Aircraft type: Douglas DC-7CF
- Operator: American Express Leasing
- Registration: N500AE (NTSB listed as previous N23N)
- Flight origin: Isla Verde International Airport, San Juan
- Destination: Las Mercedes Airport, Managua
- Passengers: 3
- Crew: 2
- Fatalities: 5
- Survivors: 0

On December 31, 1972, a DC-7 cargo aircraft crashed in Carolina, Puerto Rico, killing all five people on board, including baseball legend Roberto Clemente. As a result of inadequate maintenance, the aircraft's No. 2 engine failed after takeoff. After initiating a turn to return to the airport, the aircraft eventually descended into, or attempted to ditch into the ocean a mile offshore. The crash site was listed on the US National Register of Historic Places in 2022.

== Background ==
Roberto Clemente was a baseball star for the Pittsburgh Pirates, with whom he had won two World Series championships. On September 30, 1972, in his final at-bat, he had become only the 11th player in Major League Baseball history to collect 3,000 hits.

In October 1972, Clemente traveled to Managua, Nicaragua to coach the Puerto Rico national baseball team at the 1972 Amateur World Series. Weeks later, on December 23, a 6.3-magnitude earthquake struck the country near Managua, devastating the city and killing approximately 5,000 people. Many countries sent aid to Nicaragua, inspiring Clemente to contribute to the relief effort with his own money and to personally supervise the delivery of goods. Clemente had also been convinced to become involved by local television show host, reporter and celebrity Luis Vigoreaux.

Clemente had previously sent three cargo planes and a ship to help the Nicaraguans, but heard reports that the military had seized the goods intended for the earthquake victims. Suspecting profiteering by the military, he chartered a fourth plane so that he could visit Nicaragua and directly confront the military leader, believing that as a celebrity he could not be harmed.

== Aircraft ==
The accident aircraft was a Douglas DC-7CF, a freighter conversion of the DC-7 (cn/msn 45130/823), registered in the United States as N500AE. The aircraft first flew in 1957.

== Accident ==
Victims
Name	Age	Role	Notes
Roberto Clemente	38	Passenger	
Jerry Hill	47	Pilot	Only body recovered
Angel Lozano	Unknown	Passenger	Associate of Clemente
Francisco Matias	Unknown	Passenger	Sat in engineer's seat
Arthur S. Rivera	27	Co-pilot	Also owner of the airline

The accident caused the deaths of all five people on board, including Clemente. The airplane crashed immediately after takeoff from Isla Verde International Airport, flying into the ocean at the adjacent area known as Piñones.

=== Cargo carrier ===
Clemente and a relief committee had leased the aircraft for $4,000 from a local airline, American Air Express Leasing Company, which was owned by a 27-year-old Puerto Rican named Arthur S. Rivera.

Unknown to Clemente or to the pilot, the four-engine Douglas DC-7 had suffered a non-fatal taxiway accident just 29 days before the fateful flight took place. This accident damaged the No. 2 and No. 3 propeller blades and the No. 3 engine cooler scoop. Advised to replace one of the engines, Rivera pressed his mechanics to do what they could to inspect the engine and keep it in service, but after inspecting the engines, the mechanics could not find a reason to justify replacing one. The standard procedure after the sudden stop of a piston engine is to disassemble the engine to magnaflux its parts for cracks, but this was not done. An FAA maintenance inspector inspected the propeller shaft limits after the sudden stoppage repairs and found them within tolerances, though a later report said that he merely witnessed the inspection.

The post-war era in which cargo carriers operated surplus piston-driven prop planes was at its end, as high maintenance costs restricted the ability to keep up with newer aircraft technology. Rivera had just regained his FAA clearance to operate a cargo plane, claiming that it was his only livelihood. Struggling to keep American Air Express Leasing afloat against a tide of change in the airline industry, he began to cut corners.

=== Crew ===
After volunteers spent most of the afternoon loading the aircraft, pilot Jerry Hill boarded the plane as the sole member of the flight crew. Owner Rivera sat in the co-pilot's seat, though he was only certified to fly the twin-engine Douglas DC-3, which had Pratt & Whitney Twin Wasp engines. Rivera may not have understood the added complexity of the DC-7's Wright R-3350 Duplex-Cyclone engine, which was nearly twice the size and power. Francisco Matias, a fill-in mechanic employed by another airline who was moonlighting with several other mechanics for cargo carriers at the same airport, sat in the flight engineer's seat because Rivera and Hill had made several unsuccessful attempts to secure a flight engineer.

Hill, a well-qualified, seasoned pilot, was in command. He had been found by chance several days earlier while watching the plane being loaded. After another pilot had failed to show from a waitlist of itinerant pilots, Hill flew back from Miami on short notice. He sat in the plane for the first time the previous morning of the flight, and slept all day in a crew bunk to rest for the flight.

This was the aircraft's first flight since Rivera had purchased it several months earlier, and it was the first time that the pilot had flown with either Rivera or Matias. Clemente boarded with associate Angel Lozano around the same time as the aircraft's crew.

=== Loaded aircraft weight ===
National Transportation Safety Board (NTSB) investigators later estimated that the aircraft's gross weight at takeoff was 148,943 pounds (67,559 kg), based on a fuel receipt and customs declaration. The plane had been loaded by a ground crew led by a qualified loadmaster. The calculation was based on the following estimates and measurements:

- Plane: 72,763 pounds (33,005 kg)
- Fuel: 32,830 pounds (14,891 kg) (round-trip)
- Cargo: 38,288 pounds (17,367 kg) (from flight plan)
- Crew: Five members, 1,000 pounds (454 kg) (200 pounds [91 kg] per person)
- Fuel reserve (one hour): 4,063 pounds (1,843 kg)

At its takeoff weight, the aircraft was three percent (4,193 pounds [1,902 kg]) over the 144,750-pound (65,657 kg) maximum takeoff weight for a DC-7C. The crew submitted a flight plan with a cargo weight of 38,288 pounds (17,367 kg) (including crew and reserve fuel); without fuel, that resulted in a takeoff weight of 116,110 pounds (52,667 kg), which was under the 144,750-pound limit. At a minimum, the 1,420-mile (1,234 nmi; 2,285 km) one-way flight would need 14,240 pounds (6,459 kg) of fuel, which would mean a takeoff weight of 130,350 pounds (59,126 kg), again under the limit. With a one-way fuel load, the pilot would have to divert to somewhere such as San José, Costa Rica or Panama City to refuel for the return leg. It is possible that the flight's fuel was donated, and there would be a challenge finding fuel in the devastated city of Managua. This left the investigators to guess how much fuel was actually on board, stating that "The actual weight and balance computation made by the crew was not found." Secondary documents indicated that enough fuel for a round trip was purchased and presumably loaded onto the plane.

=== Weight calculations ===
The commercial airline industry of the 1970s used general factors in calculating takeoff weight and maximum weight limits. However, applying more current scientific knowledge may lead to a more accurate estimate of the aircraft's takeoff weight.

The aircraft's fuel weight was a focus of conjecture. The investigation found evidence that the aircraft was fueled for a round trip. The investigators calculated the weight of that fuel and pushed the aircraft weight to 148,943 pounds (67,559 kg). The 1,420-mile (1,234 nmi; 2,285 km) distance to Nicaragua was less than half the 3,605-mile (3,133 nmi; 5,802 km) range of a fully loaded DC-7C, which holds 7,825 US gallons (6,516 imp gal; 29,621 L) of fuel. At takeoff, the plane was filled to 60% of fuel capacity. However, the 1972 investigation was limited, because at the time, the effect of temperature on fuel density and weight was not well understood by the airline industry. Depending on temperature, gasoline ranges from under 6 to 6.75 pounds per US gallon (0.719 to 0.809 kg/L) at 60 °F (16 °C). The fuel needed for the four-hour flight to Nicaragua and four-hour return to Puerto Rico was somewhere between 28,480 and 32,400 pounds (12,918 and 14,696 kg), a 3,900-pound (1,769 kg) difference. Puerto Rico has a hot climate, with the December temperature usually above 80 °F (27 °C), so the fuel would have actually weighed on the low side. The estimated 4,193 pounds (1,902 kg) by which the flight was overweight is equivalent to 707 US gallons (589 imp gal; 2,676 L) of fuel, 9% of a DC-7's fuel capacity, sufficient for an hour of flight.

Another concept introduced after the 1970s is zero-fuel weight, the total weight of the airplane and all its contents minus the total weight of the usable fuel on board. The weight of fuel in the wings has less of a structural effect than that of the fuselage—modern planes have a zero-fuel weight that allows for increasing the maximum takeoff weight when that weight is in fuel.

Air density affects the maximum takeoff weight. Colder air provides more buoyancy, more engine performance and a wider safe engine operating band. The later takeoff time meant the air temperature was 76 °F (24 °C), 10 °F (6 °C) cooler than daytime evening air. The cooler, denser air provided both better buoyancy and increased engine performance, which at sea level provides a considerable increase to the aircraft's weight capacity (a DC-7C could see a 7,000-pound [3,175 kg] change with a 10° drop in air temperature).

The flight might not have been overloaded after all. Regardless, Hill would not have known the concepts of fuel density, zero-fuel weight or air buoyancy adjustment, though by experience he should have become familiar with the engine performance change. The NTSB investigators found that while weight was a factor in the accident, it was not the cause.

A more interesting calculation is that the plane could not have landed with both a full cargo load and enough fuel for a return trip; if at takeoff the aircraft was 148,943 pounds (67,559 kg), then in Nicaragua it would have landed after burning 14,240 pounds (6,459 kg) of fuel and would weigh 134,700 pounds (61,099 kg), which is 25,700 pounds (11,657 kg) over the landing-weight limit. To land at a specified weight and have return fuel would limit the cargo to 12,600 pounds (5,715 kg).

The takeoff and landing limits are commercial peacetime limits, but war emergency load limits may be up to 20% higher. The war emergency takeoff limit would be 178,000 pounds (80,739 kg) and the landing limit would be 160,000 pounds (72,575 kg); the DC-7C was within those limits, which are set for new military aircraft receiving military maintenance. Hill would have been aware of these emergency cargo limits from his time as a U.S. Air Force major flying the Douglas C-124 Globemaster II on a transpacific route (possibly the Douglas C-74 Globemaster). Whether the Nicaraguan earthquake relief was an event allowing for emergency cargo limits is an open question.

Clemente's wife said she was concerned that the plane seemed old and overloaded.

=== Safety oversight ===
As air traffic control is merely responsible for directing traffic and cannot be expected to determine if a flight should take off, a lawsuit was brought charging that the FAA should have prohibited the takeoff. The FAA argued that the aircraft was overloaded rather than mechanically unsound. The court ruled that because the FAA had not inspected planes at that airport previously, it was not liable, despite its knowledge of the aircraft's condition and its failure to act. The court stated that the takeoff decision is ultimately the pilot's responsibility, though it did not find Hill at fault.

=== Takeoff ===
On the dark, moonless night of December 31, 1972, at 9:11 p.m. local time, after the previously aborted takeoff and additional mechanical work, the plane taxied around the airport's runway 7. By then the weather had cleared and visibility was at 10 miles (16 km), with only a few clouds visible.

After engine run-up by the crew, the flight was cleared for takeoff at 9:20:30 p.m. for the four-hour flight to Nicaragua. The aircraft took an exceptionally long takeoff roll and gained very little altitude. A left turn was commenced towards the north, and at 9:23:15 p.m., the San Juan tower received the following transmission: "N500AE coming back around." To land safely, the aircraft would have first needed to dump 32,000 pounds of fuel; as a typical dump rate is one to two tons of fuel per minute, this process would have taken between 16 and 32 minutes.

At or soon after the time of the last radio transmission, the plane experienced a catastrophic failure of engine No. 2 and possibly also of engine No. 3. Engines 2 and 3 are closest to the fuselage and contain the hydraulic pumps. If both were lost, the pilot would be forced to rely on a controls reversion system. With reduced control and possibly loss of electrical power, the pilot was then faced with the challenge of ditching the aircraft into the sea while maintaining a relation to the horizon over water on a moonless night. In this scenario, the aircraft was essentially unflyable.

With at least one engine lost, the airplane slowly descended and about 10 to 30 seconds later crashed into the Atlantic Ocean at a point approximately 1.5 miles (1.3 nmi; 2.4 km) offshore, and 2.5 miles (2.2 nmi; 4.0 km) on the 040-degree radial from the western end of Runway 25. In that time, between 500 and 2,000 pounds (230 and 910 kg) of fuel could have been dumped. In the last seconds of flight, ground effect would have kept the plane aloft, skimming the wave tops.

Delgado Cintrón, a mechanic who witnessed the takeoff from the ground at the airport, testified that the engines sounded even and normal. However, the plane was too low at 25 feet (8 m) off the ground. Other witnesses estimated that the plane gained altitude to 100 feet (30 m). After the aircraft was out of sight behind trees, the engines sounded fine and then, a few seconds later, Cintrón heard three backfires and a large explosion, which he thought was the impact with the ocean, followed by silence.

=== Issues with engine design ===
That a DC-7 had lost an engine on takeoff was not unexpected. During World War II, twice as many aircraft were lost because of problems with the same type of engine (in aircraft such as the Boeing B-29 Superfortress) as were lost to enemy fire.

The Wright R-3350 engine that powered the DC-7 had started as a problematic multi-row radial design that was rushed into wartime production. In post-war civilian use, those problems continued, and aircraft with this engine were less favored for commercial flights and often were converted to cargo planes.

Clemente would have had no reason to have known the history of the R-3350, but Captain Hill would have had a good understanding from over 12,000 flight hours piloting multi-row, piston-powered, radial-engine aircraft over his nearly 30-year career, including the DC-4, DC-6, DC-7, C-46 and the USAF Globemaster.

An issue related to the cooling of additional rows of radial cylinders in multi-row radial engines was understood and well known. A key concern was a lean air/fuel condition causing detonation because of the high supercharger boost on such engines, which by itself and with cooling issues was dangerous. Problems with cooling had plagued the engine since its use in the hot Pacific climate during World War II, prompting the military to add an air scoop to the top of the engine cowling that directed air to cool the back cylinders. Those problems only added to the engine's sensitivity to detonation, particularly on takeoff.

== Recovery ==
Recovery efforts started almost immediately after the aircraft went down. By 11:00 p.m., radio and television stations across Puerto Rico were informing the public about the accident. A crowd formed around Piñones Beach, many of whom tried to help search efforts. Of the five people on board the plane, only Hill's body was recovered.

Because of extremely rough surface conditions and poor underwater visibility, the wreckage site was not discovered until January 4, 1973. On or after January 7, divers from a naval ship reported that the aircraft wreckage was scattered throughout the bottom of the ocean at a depth of 100 to 130 feet (30 to 40 m), in an area of approximately 4 acres (1.6 ha). The aircraft was broken into several sections, most of them badly crushed or demolished. Both wings were separated from the fuselage. The cockpit area forward of the main junction box was destroyed and the instrument panel and mechanical controls were missing. The nose gear assembly was retracted. All four engines were accounted for, but none of them were found attached to the wing structure. Two of the engines were together at a distance of approximately 200 feet (61 m) from the right wing, which itself was upside down on the left side of a fuselage section.

Three engines were recovered from the ocean floor on January 11, 1973, including Nos. 2 and 3. A review of the engine log books showed that the engines had received 100-hour inspections four and five months earlier and prior to being purchased by Rivera. All spark plugs in engines 3 and 4, and a few cylinders in engines 2, 3 and 4, were replaced. During the previous flight in September, the No. 3 engine was shut down and feathered as a result of spark plug fouling.

- The rings were found intact in the cylinders of No. 3 engine, however, spark plugs had repeatedly fouled in the previous months and likely would have fouled before completion of the planned flight.
  - The 36 spark plugs were undamaged with normal gaps.
  - The 18 cylinders contained no damage.
  - The crankshaft was broken and deeply wrinkled and slightly twisted; it was not determined if this was on or prior to impact (under full power on entering the water and when water resistance on the prop caused the crankshaft to twist until breaking).
  - The sumps contained a thick black sludge (including pieces from previous engine repairs).
- The propeller of the No. 2 engine was feathered, indicating that there was full engine failure at some point before the crash and that the pilot had been able to respond to this. The No. 2 engine was internally destroyed.
  - The No. 16 cylinder was destroyed. The two spark plugs were bent and coated in oil.
  - All 18 rods connecting the pistons to the crankshaft were broken.
  - All the cylinder skirts were bent (indicating the crankshaft was continuing to turn).
  - The sumps contained a thick black sludge.
- The No. 1 engine showed no damage.
  - The spark plugs had no fouling and the electrode gaps were normal.
  - The valves and pistons were undamaged.
  - The sumps contained a thick black sludge.

Part of the fuselage and the tail of the airplane were also found.

== Causes ==
The NTSB concluded that after a failure of one engine the plane had inadequate power to maintain altitude during a turn (suggesting that the pilot could not dump fuel fast enough to achieve a weight-to-power ratio that allowed level flight). After a few miles, the plane flew into the ocean on a moonless night. The lack of a horizon possibly prevented the pilot from realizing the altitude loss from only 100 feet (30 m) over the ocean, which would have indicated a need to prepare for a water landing with reduced engine power on splashdown (the engines appear to have been at full power, and fuselage damage indicated an aircraft at higher speed).

An unexplored scenario is that, following an engine loss, the pilot began fuel dumping to lighten the aircraft. The prop wash dispersed the fuel, and given the low elevation, formed a thermobaric weapon that was ignited by the burning engine. The resulting air burst destroyed the aircraft. The DC-7 contained fuel-dumping facilities. A hazard of fuel dumping is ignition of the fuel, and precautions are taken to eliminate all sources of ignition, and also to prevent turbulence that mixes the fuel with air. Aircraft do not typically explode on impact, and in this case the plane would have been more or less in level controlled flight into the water. An air burst explains the explosion heard after an engine fire was seen, as well as the heavy destruction of the fuselage.

A scenario considered by investigators but later dismissed involved a load shift on turning, which careened the plane into a wing strike with water, cartwheeling the plane along the surface. Two engines were found several hundred feet directly ahead of the wing, indicating a level entry into the water.

The cause of the crash could not be determined precisely because of the difficulties encountered while attempting to recover the wreckage. Probable causes were attributed to lean detonation, poor maintenance, excessive wear in engine components, engine damage from a previous taxiing accident that was not repaired, an uncertified co-pilot, an uncertified flight engineer, a 4,000-pound fuel overload and inadequate crew preparation in correcting these issues.

NTSB findings:

Complete power loss—complete engine failure/flameout - 1 engine (No. 2)

Partial power loss—partial loss of power - 1 engine (No. 3) (presumably because of a lack of adequate power for three engines)

Probable Cause:

- Power plant (failed because of engine damage from sudden stoppage during a taxiway accident on December 2, 1972)
  - engine structure: No. 2 master and connecting rods
  - engine structure: No. 2 cylinder assembly
  - engine structure: No. 2 piston, piston rings
- Miscellaneous acts and conditions, No. 3 excessive-wear/play (unable to develop full power)
- Personnel: inadequate maintenance, servicing and inspection
- Pilot: inadequate pre-flight preparation and planning

Factors:

- Operational supervisory personnel: deficiency, company-maintained equipment, services, regulation
- Miscellaneous acts
  - Improperly loaded aircraft weight and/or center of gravity (over maximum weight by 4,193 pounds [1,902 kg])
  - Previous damage
  - Aircraft contact with the water

Remarks:

- Flight engineer unqualified (later court proceedings found there was no evidence that Matias was acting as flight engineer, despite sitting in the flight engineer's seat)

== In popular culture ==
The crash is referred to in the 2011 film The Ides of March.
