= 1972 Nicaragua earthquake =

Earthquake in Nicaragua

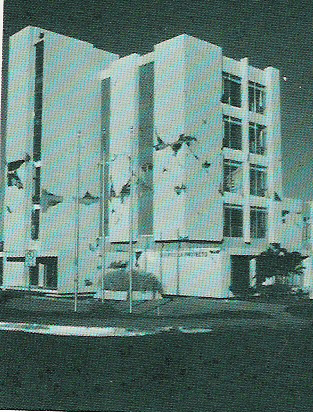
- Damaged office building southeast of downtown Managua

- Location within Central America
- UTC time: 1972-12-23 06:29:44
- ISC event: 766571
- USGS-ANSS: ComCat
- Local date: December 23, 1972
- Local time: 00:29:44
- Duration: 10–15 seconds
- Magnitude: 6.3 M_{w}
- Depth: 10 km (6.2 mi)
- Epicenter: 12.18°N 86.22°W
- Areas affected: Nicaragua
- Max. intensity: MMI IX (Violent) MSK-64 IX (Destructive)
- Casualties: 4,000–11,000 dead 20,000 injured 300,000 displaced

The 1972 Nicaragua earthquake occurred at 12:29:44 a.m. local time (06:29:44 UTC) on 23 December near Managua, the capital of Nicaragua. It had a moment magnitude of 6.3 and a maximum MSK intensity of IX (Destructive). The epicenter was 28 km (17 mi) northeast of the city centre with a depth of about 10 km (6.2 mi). The earthquake caused widespread casualties among Managua's residents: 4,000–11,000 were killed, 20,000 were injured and over 300,000 were left homeless.

== Tectonic setting ==
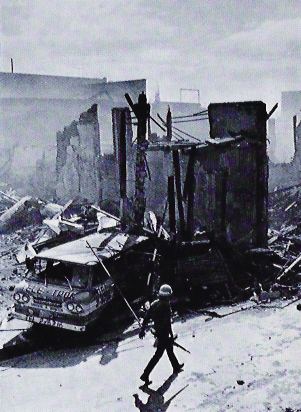
A Nicaraguan soldier patrolling against looters in the aftermath of the earthquake

Managua, which lies on the southern shore of Lake Xolotlán, near the western coast of Nicaragua, is situated within an active volcanic zone known as the Central American Volcanic Chain. The city has a long history of volcanic and seismic activity which arise from the relative movements of two crustal plates which intersect near the southwestern border of Central America. The Cocos plate, located east of the East Pacific Rise, is moving northeastward and is slowly being submerged (subducted) under the Caribbean plate. The zone of dipping is initiated at the surface of the Middle America Trench, which extends 4 to 5 kilometers deep along the Pacific Coast from Mexico to Costa Rica. But rather than a simple crustal movement between the two plates the earthquake was believed to have been caused by a shallow adjustment to geological pressure at the southwestern corner of the Caribbean plate.

== Damage ==
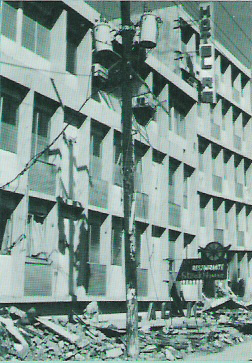
A hotel destroyed by the quake in Managua's centre

The earthquake severely damaged 27 square kilometres (10 sq mi) and destroyed 13 square kilometres (5.0 sq mi) in the city centre. The majority of the buildings in the city's central business district sustained significant structural damage including a 19-story building, one 15-story building, approximately 5 buildings that were 7 to 9 stories tall and more than 25 buildings that were from 3 to 6 stories tall. Much of the damage arose from seismic ground movement which occurred within 10–15 seconds of the main shock. The majority of the factories and smaller buildings were severely damaged. Many of the houses and small shops were over 40 years old and constructed using a local method called taquezal (or talquezal), in which the timber framed walls are filled with stone and finished with plaster, covered by roofs of unmortared clay tile. The design is very susceptible to earthquake damage. An estimated 53,000 homes in the city were damaged. The water and electrical power networks were severely damaged and more than a week after the earthquake only 10% of the city had any working water service.

== Surface faulting ==
One of the most significant geological effects of the earthquake quake was surface faulting. Examination of the fault lines indicated a lateral motion moving in a northeasterly direction and aftershock data has revealed at least one of the faults extends from the surface to a depth of 8 to 10 kilometers beneath the city of Managua.

== Aftershocks ==
Within an hour after the main shock, two aftershocks, one of magnitude 5.0 and the other 5.2, occurred at 1:18 a.m. and 1:20 a.m.

== Response ==
Two-thirds of Managua's 1,000,000 residents were displaced and faced food shortage and disease, and dry-season winds worsened the problem with fires created by the disaster. Because of the damaging effects of the earthquake, many of the emergency services in the city were operating at a seriously lower level than normal. The earthquake destroyed all the fire-fighting equipment available, and fires were prevalent in some areas for several days. All four main hospitals, which before the disaster had 1,650 beds, were unserviceable.

The Nicaraguan government appealed for aid, and the government accepted aid from countries like the United States and Mexico and some 25 other countries, worth millions of dollars. Despite this and the magnitude of the devastation, the aid was not distributed well and the ruling Liberal-Conservative Junta, led by President Anastasio Somoza Debayle, was the target of criticism and was accused of stockpiling foreign aid which never reached the victims of the earthquake. It was because of these reports that the Puerto Rican baseball star Roberto Clemente chose to personally accompany the fourth of a number of relief flights he had organized. That flight crashed on 31 December, killing Clemente among others.

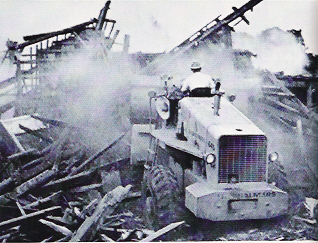
Bulldozers shifting the rubble

Another difficulty was that much of the material aid donated was inappropriate for the needs of the affected Nicaraguans, including such items as winter clothes (Managua's climate is tropical) and frozen TV dinners.

It was later claimed that Somoza and his associates had used foreign aid for their own gain. Opposition to the regime, which had begun to surface before the earthquake, increased quickly among the lower classes and even among members of the upper and middle classes fed up with Somoza's corruption. This grew into a revolt that became the Nicaraguan Revolution, in which Somoza was overthrown in 1979.

Because of the extent of the damage, the faulty underground terrain, the misappropriation of aid, and the subsequent revolution and 11-year civil war, much of the city centre remained ruined for almost 20 years. Reconstruction only began in earnest in the 1990s.

== Aftermath ==
The earthquake changed the face of Managua during its decades of recovery. The city center is no longer clearly defined, as buildings have been constructed away from the city center. During the massive evacuations, the displaced residents set up camp around water resources and areas that remained somewhat unaffected. Although Managua remains Central America's second largest capital and metropolitan area, the bulk of its residents reside in barrios or neighborhoods that are of considerable distance from the city center. Today, in place of the large buildings that used to exist in the center, the government set up the "Plaza de la Fe" (Faith Square) in honor of Pope John Paul II.

== See also ==
- List of earthquakes in 1972
- List of earthquakes in Nicaragua
- 1972 Puerto Rico DC-7 crash
