= Barton Malow =

North American construction firm

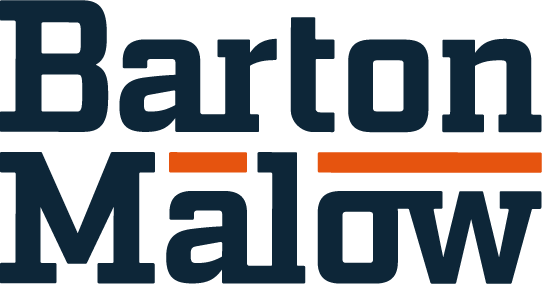
- Type: Private
- Founded: August 4, 1924; 102 years ago
- Founder: Carl Barton, Arnold Malow
- Headquarters: Southfield, Michigan
- Area served: United States, Canada
- Key people: Ben Maibach III (Chairman Emeritus); Ryan Maibach (President + CEO)
- Services: Construction Management, Integrated Project Delivery, Self-Perform
- Revenue: $4.4 billion (2026)
- Number of employees: 3,500 (2024)
- Subsidiaries: LIFTbuild
- Website: www.bartonmalow.com

Barton Malow is a construction company headquartered in Southfield, Michigan. Founded in 1924 in Detroit as the C.O. Barton Company, the firm provides construction management, general contracting, design-build, program management, and self-perform construction services across both the United States and Canada. The company has remained privately held and family-controlled throughout its history, with four generations of the Maibach family in leadership roles. Barton Malow has consistently ranked among Engineering News-Record's top 40 contractors by revenue, with $4.4 billion in reported revenue in 2026.

Barton Malow has built automotive and industrial facilities for Ford Motor Company and General Motors since the 1960s, including electric vehicle battery manufacturing facilities in the 2020s. Its project portfolio includes sports venues such as the Pontiac Silverdome, Oriole Park at Camden Yards, and Soldier Field.

The company also developed LIFTbuild, a top-down construction technology that was the subject of a 2023 Harvard Business School case study.

== History ==
=== Founding and early years (1924–1949) ===
Carl Osborn Barton founded the C.O. Barton Company on August 4, 1924, in Detroit, Michigan. The firm's initial work consisted of interior renovations for Michigan Bell Telephone Company.

In 1927, Arnold Malow joined the company as vice president and treasurer and the firm was eventually renamed to Barton Malow Company.

=== Postwar growth and reorganization (1949–1964) ===
Ben Maibach Jr., who had joined the company as a laborer in 1938 and worked his way through field management roles, eventually became a co-owner alongside Harold Butler. By 1960, Maibach Jr. had become president of the company.

In 1951, Barton Malow established a profit-sharing and pension plan for its employees, described as the first such plan by a U.S. contractor.

By the early 1960s, Barton Malow was ranked 35th in construction put in place by general contractors in the United States and second in Michigan by Architectural Forum, a nationally circulated Time Inc. trade publication.

=== Construction management and the Silverdome era (1964–1984) ===
In 1964, Barton Malow began construction of a 2.6-million-square-foot stamping plant in Woodhaven, Michigan, for Ford Motor Company. The project, built to support production of the Ford Mustang, employed fast-track construction methods in which construction began before design documents were fully complete — an approach the company later promoted as the construction management (CM) delivery method.

In the early 1970s, Rollie Wilkening, then Barton Malow's executive vice president, served on construction management committees of the Associated General Contractors of America (AGC) and became an advocate for CM, delivering a presentation titled "Prelude to Success or Is It Really For Me?" at the 1973 National AGC Convention in San Francisco.

During this period, the company also completed construction of the Pontiac Silverdome (1973–1975), a stadium for the Detroit Lions featuring a 10-acre Teflon-coated fiberglass roof supported entirely by air pressure — among the earliest major athletic facilities to feature such a roof. The $55.7 million project was completed in 23 months. The project was cited by the National Society of Professional Engineers as one of the "10 Outstanding Engineering Achievements" of 1975. Barton Malow went on to build additional dome stadiums, including the Hubert H. Humphrey Metrodome in Minneapolis and the Georgia Dome in Atlanta.

Barton Malow's relationship with General Motors dates to at least 1964, when Engineering News-Record named the firm as one of three Detroit contractors that performed the majority of GM's construction work. That relationship expanded in the early 1980s when GM awarded Barton Malow construction management contracts for assembly plants in Orion Township, Michigan, and Wentzville, Missouri, each valued at approximately $400 million. The firm also managed construction of the Detroit-Hamtramck Assembly Center, which carried a budget of $600 million. By 1980, the company's annual contracts exceeded $1.15 billion, placing it 23rd among all U.S. contractors according to Engineering News-Record.

Ben Maibach III became president in 1981, continuing family leadership of the company.

=== Sports venues and geographic expansion (1984–2010) ===
The company's sports construction portfolio expanded during this period. As construction manager in a joint venture with Sverdrup, Barton Malow built Oriole Park at Camden Yards for the Baltimore Orioles, completed in 1992 and widely credited with establishing a new standard for retro-style urban ballparks. The firm later worked on stadiums for several other professional sports franchises, including Coors Field for the Colorado Rockies, PNC Park for the Pittsburgh Pirates, Paul Brown Stadium (now Paycor Stadium) for the Cincinnati Bengals, Nationwide Arena for the Columbus Blue Jackets, and M&T Bank Stadium for the Baltimore Ravens. In a tri-venture with Turner Construction and Kenny Construction (TBMK), the company renovated Soldier Field for the Chicago Bears, completed in 2003, constructing a new seating bowl within the stadium's existing historic colonnades.

In other sectors, Barton Malow served as part of the joint venture for the Detroit Metropolitan Airport North Terminal Redevelopment. The company also expanded its healthcare portfolio, serving as construction manager for the 402-bed University of Virginia Replacement Hospital and the Shriners Hospitals for Children Burns Unit in Boston in the 1980s and 90s. The Shriners project required constructing a new facility above an occupied, in-use hospital and won the 2000 AGC Build America Award.

The company moved into a self-designed and self-built headquarters in Southfield, Michigan, a $22 million facility that opened in November 2001.

=== Recent history (2011–present) ===
Ryan Maibach, Ben III's son and a Purdue University construction management graduate who had joined the firm in 1997, was appointed president and CEO in 2011.

The company entered the electric vehicle and battery manufacturing construction market, building lithium-ion battery plants for Ultium Cells (a then-General Motors–LG Energy Solution joint venture) in Lordstown, Ohio, Spring Hill, Tennessee, and Lansing, Michigan, delivered under Integrated Project Delivery (IPD). Building Design + Construction has ranked the company the top IPD construction firm in the United States from 2022 through 2025.

Barton Malow also served as construction manager for the Ford BlueOval SK Battery Park in Glendale, Kentucky, a 1,500-acre campus, which received a 2026 AGC Build America Award.

Barton Malow's higher education and healthcare work has also continued. The firm served as construction manager for the Eli and Edythe Broad Art Museum at Michigan State University, designed by Zaha Hadid, which was named ENR Midwest Overall Project of the Year in 2013. More recently, Barton Malow has been part of a tri-venture constructing the $2.2 billion Henry Ford Health Destination: Grand expansion in Detroit. Engineering News-Record reported that the placement of W14x1000 steel columns in the tower, installed in 2025, marked the first such placement in a healthcare facility worldwide.

The firm is also the general contractor for Hudson's Detroit, which Construction Dive described as the largest ground-up development in Detroit in over 50 years.

As of 2024, the company reported more than 3,500 employees with offices across nine U.S. states and two Canadian provinces.

== LIFTbuild ==
LIFTbuild, a wholly owned subsidiary of Barton Malow, developed a top-down construction method for high-rise buildings. The technology assembles building floors at ground level and then lifts them into place along structural concrete cores using a jacking system.

The proof-of-concept project, the Exchange building in Detroit's Greektown neighborhood, broke ground in September 2021. Sources report varying figures for the Exchange building; as‑built documentation and trade coverage describe the 16‑story tower as approximately 166,000 square feet with 153 rental apartments and 12 condominiums, while contemporaneous news reporting cited a larger overall floor area and higher condominium count. The project marked the first top‑down high‑rise building constructed in the United States since the 1970s, according to Engineering News‑Record. The final floorplate was lifted in January 2023.

Proponents argue the method improves worker safety by eliminating much work at height and enables better quality control through an enclosed, climate-controlled work environment. The Exchange project was completed approximately 8% ahead of schedule, and the development team has projected potential timeline reductions of 20–30% on future projects as the process matures.

In June 2023, Harvard Business School published a case study titled "Barton Malow: Building From the Top-Down," examining the company's efforts to commercialize LIFTbuild and the challenges of innovating within a traditionally slow-to-change industry.

== Industry involvement and recognition ==
Barton Malow has been a long-standing member of the Associated General Contractors of America (AGC). Ben Maibach Jr. served as president of the AGC Detroit Chapter, as did his son Ben Maibach III in 1986, while executive vice president Rollie Wilkening held a chapter leadership role in the 1970s.

The company has received multiple AGC Build America Awards, including for the University of Michigan Stadium (2011), Daytona International Speedway (2017 Grand Award), and the Notre Dame Campus Crossroads project (2019).
