= 1988 Baseball Hall of Fame balloting =

Elections to the Baseball Hall of Fame

National Baseball

Hall of Fame and Museum
- New inductees: 1
- via BBWAA: 1
- Total inductees: 200
- Induction date: July 31, 1988

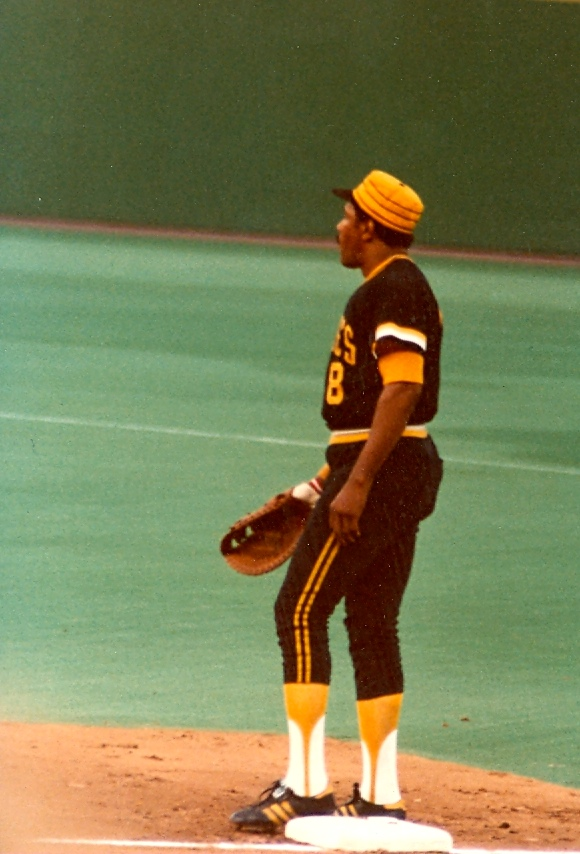
Willie Stargell, sole 1988 inductee

Elections to the Baseball Hall of Fame for 1988 followed the system in place since 1978. The Baseball Writers' Association of America (BBWAA) voted by mail to select from recent major league players and elected Willie Stargell. The Veterans Committee met in closed sessions to consider older major league players as well as managers, umpires, executives, and figures from the Negro leagues; it selected no one. A formal induction ceremony was held in Cooperstown, New York, on July 31, 1988, with Commissioner of Baseball Peter Ueberroth in attendance.

== BBWAA election ==
The BBWAA was authorized to elect players active in 1968 or later, but not after 1982; the ballot included candidates from the 1987 ballot who received at least 5% of the vote but were not elected, along with selected players, chosen by a screening committee, whose last appearance was in 1982. All 10-year members of the BBWAA were eligible to vote.

Voters were instructed to cast votes for up to 10 candidates; any candidate receiving votes on at least 75% of the ballots would be honored with induction to the Hall. The ballot consisted of 44 players; a total of 427 ballots were cast, with 321 votes required for election. A total of 2,819 individual votes were cast, an average of 6.60 per ballot. Those candidates receiving less than 5% of the vote will not appear on future BBWAA ballots, but may eventually be considered by the Veterans Committee.

Candidates who were eligible for the first time are indicated here with a dagger (†). The candidate who received at least 75% of the vote and was elected is indicated in bold italics; candidates who have since been elected in subsequent elections are indicated in italics. The 20 candidates who received less than 5% of the vote, thus becoming ineligible for future BBWAA consideration, are indicated with an asterisk (*).

Roger Maris, Elston Howard and Don Larsen were on the ballot for the 15th and final time.

Player	Votes	Percent	Change	Year
**Willie Stargell**†	352	82.4	-	1st
Jim Bunning	317	74.2	▲4.2%	12th
Tony Oliva	202	47.3	▲8.6%	7th
Orlando Cepeda	199	46.6	▲3.3%	9th
Roger Maris	184	43.1	▲0.5%	15th
Harvey Kuenn	168	39.3	▲4.4%	12th
Bill Mazeroski	143	33.5	▲3.2%	11th
Luis Tiant†	132	30.9	-	1st
Maury Wills	127	29.7	▲2.3%	11th
Ken Boyer	109	25.5	▲2.3%	9th
Mickey Lolich	109	25.5	▲5.2%	4th
Ron Santo	108	25.3	▲6.4%	5th
Minnie Miñoso	90	21.1	▲1.2%	4th
Roy Face	79	18.5	▼0.4%	13th
Vada Pinson	67	15.7	▲4.1%	7th
Joe Torre	60	14.1	▲2.7%	6th
Sparky Lyle†	56	13.1	-	1st
Elston Howard	53	12.4	▲1.7%	15th
Dick Allen	52	12.2	▼1.1%	6th
Curt Flood	48	11.2	▼0.9%	7th
Thurman Munson	32	7.5	▲0.7%	8th
Don Larsen	31	7.3	-	15th
Wilbur Wood	30	7.0	▲0.7%	5th
Bobby Bonds	27	6.3	▲0.5%	2nd
Manny Mota†	18	4.2	-	1st
Mark Belanger†*	16	3.7	-	1st
Bill Lee†*	3	0.7	-	1st
Lee May†*	3	0.7	-	1st
Reggie Smith†*	3	0.7	-	1st
Al Hrabosky†*	1	0.2	-	1st
Stan Bahnsen†*	0	0.0	-	1st
Ross Grimsley†*	0	0.0	-	1st
Larry Hisle†*	0	0.0	-	1st
Grant Jackson†*	0	0.0	-	1st
Randy Jones†*	0	0.0	-	1st
John Mayberry†*	0	0.0	-	1st
Lynn McGlothen†*	0	0.0	-	1st
Doc Medich†*	0	0.0	-	1st
John Milner†*	0	0.0	-	1st
Willie Montañez†*	0	0.0	-	1st
Joe Rudi†*	0	0.0	-	1st
Jim Spencer†*	0	0.0	-	1st
Del Unser†*	0	0.0	-	1st
Rick Wise†*	0	0.0	-	1st

Key to colors
Elected to the Hall. These individuals are also indicated in **bold italics**.
Players who were elected in future elections. These individuals are also indicated in plain italics.
Players not yet elected who returned on the 1989 ballot.
Eliminated from future BBWAA voting. These individuals remain eligible for future Veterans Committee consideration.

The newly-eligible players included 21 All-Stars, two of whom were not included on the ballot, representing a total of 44 All-Star selections. Among the new candidates were 7-time All-Stars Willie Stargell and Reggie Smith, who were the only candidates to have been selected at least five times. The field included one MVP (Stargell), two Cy Young Award-winners (Randy Jones and Sparky Lyle) and one Rookie of the Year (Stan Bahnsen).

Players eligible for the first time who were not included on the ballot were: John D'Acquisto, Barry Foote, Tom Griffin, Mick Kelleher, Len Randle, Ken Reitz, Dave Roberts, Eddie Solomon, Don Stanhouse, Fred Stanley, and Frank Taveras.

== J. G. Taylor Spink Award ==
Jim Murray (1919–1998) received the J. G. Taylor Spink Award honoring a baseball writer. The award was voted at the December 1987 meeting of the BBWAA, and included in the summer 1988 ceremonies.
