= Statue of Willie Stargell =

Sculpture in Pittsburgh, Pennsylvania

Coordinates: 40°26′48.5″N 80°0′14.2″W

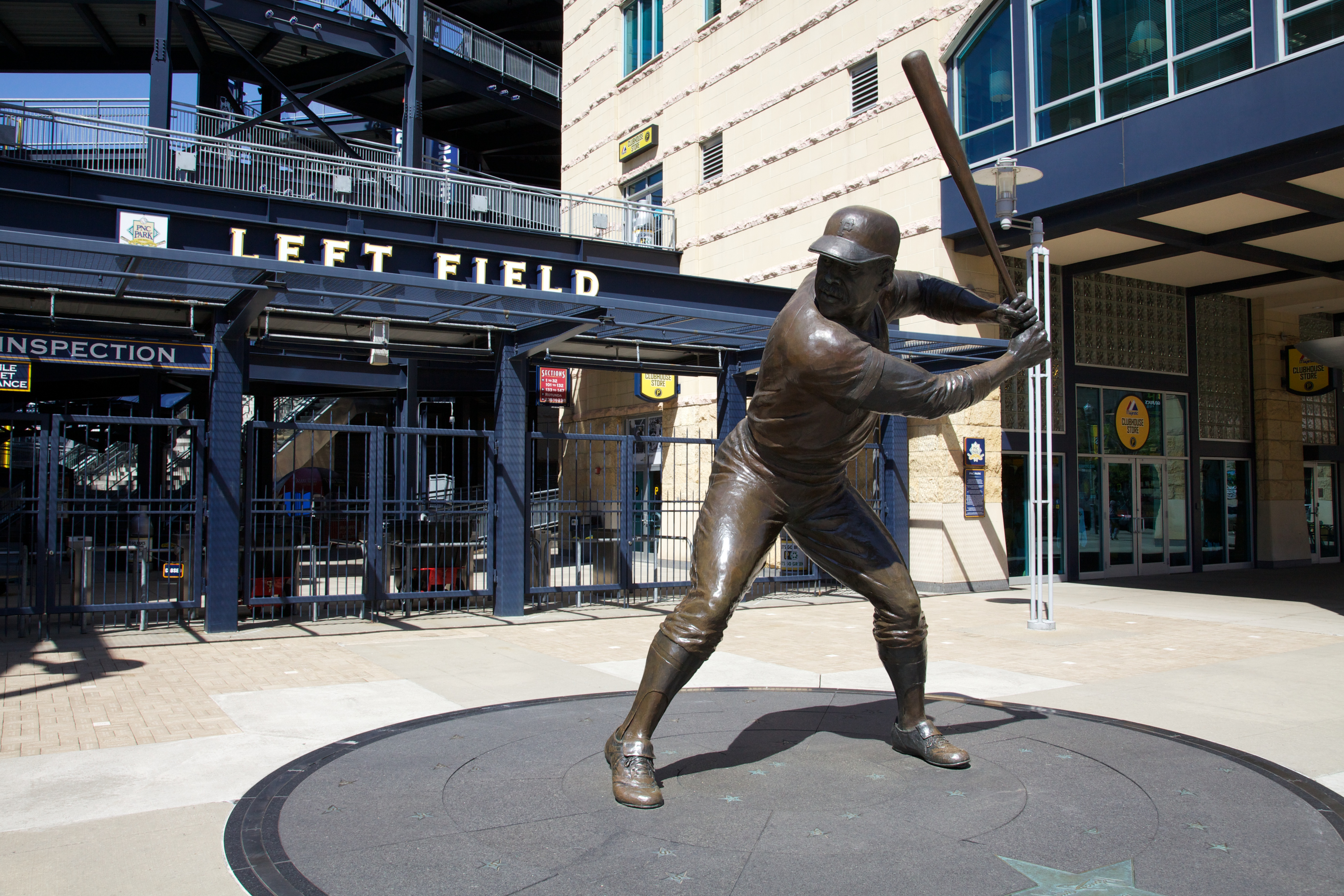
- Stargell's statue outside PNC Park
- Artist: Susan Wagner
- Year: 2001
- Medium: Bronze sculpture
- Subject: Willie Stargell
- Location: PNC Park Pittsburgh, Pennsylvania, U.S.

In 2001, the Pittsburgh Pirates unveiled a 12-foot statue of Baseball Hall of Fame outfielder Willie Stargell, just before the opening of PNC Park. It was created by sculptor Susan Wagner who also created the statue of Stargell's ex-teammates Roberto Clemente and Bill Mazeroski.

== Information ==
The statue was unveiled on April 7, just before the opening of the new PNC Park. Stargell was too ill to attend the ceremony himself and would die two days later, on the day PNC Park hosted its first baseball game.

To create the statue, sculptor Susan Wagner studied old photographs and video of Stargell along with vintage bats and Pittsburgh uniforms. It depicts Stargell in his iconic batting stance. The base of the statue includes "Stargell stars", a recognition handed out by Stargell toward the end of his career with the Pirates, as well as a quote from Stargell: "Last night, coming in from the airport, we came through the tunnel and the city opened up its arms and I felt at home."
