= PNC Park =

Baseball stadium in Pittsburgh, Pennsylvania, US

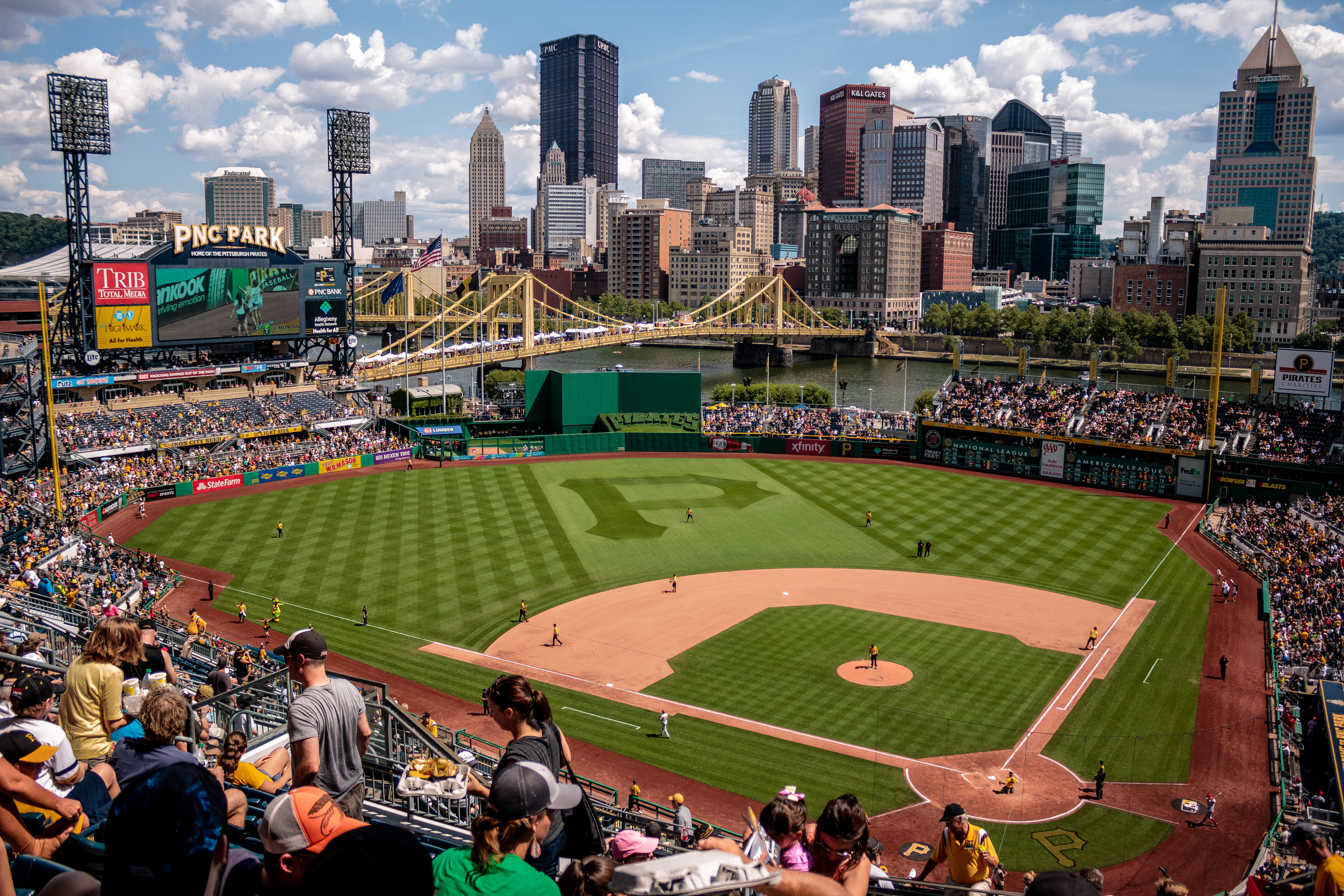
- PNC Park in 2016

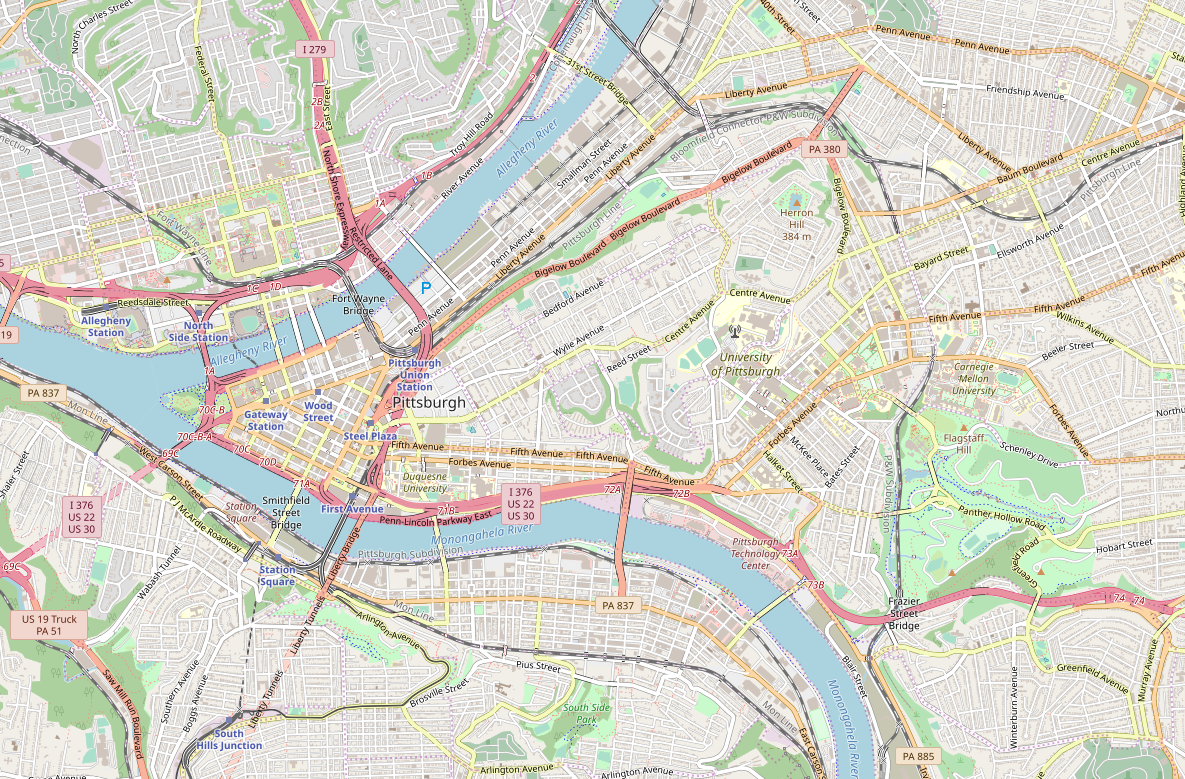
- Location in Pittsburgh Location in Pennsylvania Location in the United States
- Address: 115 Federal Street
- Location: Pittsburgh, Pennsylvania, U.S.
- Coordinates: 40°26′49″N 80°0′21″W
- Owner: Sports & Exhibition Authority of Pittsburgh and Allegheny County
- Operator: Pittsburgh Pirates
- Capacity: 37,898 (2001–2003); 38,496 (2004–2007); 38,362 (2008–2017); 38,747 (2018–present)
- Surface: Kentucky bluegrass
- Record attendance: 42,633 (Noah Kahan, July 3, 2026)
- Field size: Left Field – 325 feet (99 m); Left-Center – 383 feet (117 m); Deep Left-Center Field – 410 feet (125 m); Center Field – 399 feet (122 m); Right-Center – 375 feet (114 m); Right Field – 320 feet (98 m); Backstop – 51 feet (16 m)
- Public transit: North Side

Construction
- Groundbreaking: April 7, 1999
- Opened: March 31, 2001
- Cost: US$216 million ($393 million in 2025 dollars)
- Architects: HOK Sport (now Populous); L.D. Astorino & Associates
- Project manager: Project Management Consultants LLC
- Structural engineer: Thornton-Tomasetti Group Inc.
- Services engineers: M*E Engineers; GAI Consultants, Inc.
- General contractor: Dick Corporation/Barton Malow JV

Tenant
- Pittsburgh Pirates (MLB) (2001–present)

Website
- mlb.com/pirates/ballpark

PNC Park is a baseball stadium on the North Shore of Pittsburgh, Pennsylvania. It is the fifth location to serve as the home ballpark of Major League Baseball's Pittsburgh Pirates. Opened during the 2001 MLB season, PNC Park sits along the Allegheny River with a view of the Downtown Pittsburgh skyline. Constructed of steel and limestone, it has a natural grass playing surface and can seat 38,747 people for baseball. It was built just to the east of its predecessor, Three Rivers Stadium, which was demolished in 2001.

Plans to build a new stadium for the Pirates originated in 1991 but did not come to fruition for five years. Funded in conjunction with Acrisure Stadium and the David L. Lawrence Convention Center, the park was built for $216 million in 24 months, faster than most modern stadiums. Built in the "retro-classic" style modeled after past venues such as Pittsburgh's Forbes Field, PNC Park also introduced unique features, such as the use of limestone in the building's facade. The park has a riverside concourse, steel truss work, an extensive out-of-town scoreboard, and local eateries. Several tributes to former Pirate Roberto Clemente are incorporated into the ballpark, and the nearby Sixth Street Bridge was renamed in his honor. In addition to the Pirates' regular-season and postseason home games, PNC Park has hosted other events, including the 2006 Major League Baseball All-Star Game and numerous concerts.

PNC Financial Services originally purchased the naming rights in 1998 for $30 million over 20 years, and currently holds the rights through 2031.

Several writers have called PNC Park one of the best baseball stadiums in America, citing its location, views of the Pittsburgh skyline and Allegheny River, timeless design, and clear angles of the field from every seat.

== History ==
=== Planning and funding ===
On September 5, 1991, Pittsburgh mayor Sophie Masloff proposed a new 44,000-seat stadium for the Pittsburgh Pirates on the city's North Side. Three Rivers Stadium, the Pirates' and Steelers' home at the time, had been designed for functionality rather than "architecture and aesthetics". As well, its location made it hard to reach from much of the city, with traffic congestion before and after games. Discussions about a new ballpark took place, but were never seriously considered until entrepreneur Kevin McClatchy purchased the team in February 1996. Until McClatchy's purchase, plans about the team remaining in Pittsburgh were uncertain. In 1996, Masloff's successor, Tom Murphy, created the "Forbes Field II Task Force". Made up of 29 political and business leaders, the team studied the challenges of constructing a new ballpark. Their final report, published on June 26, 1996, evaluated 13 possible locations. The "North Side site" was recommended due to its affordable cost, potential to develop the surrounding area, and opportunity to incorporate the city skyline into the stadium's design. The site selected for the ballpark is just upriver from the site of early Pirates home field Exposition Park.

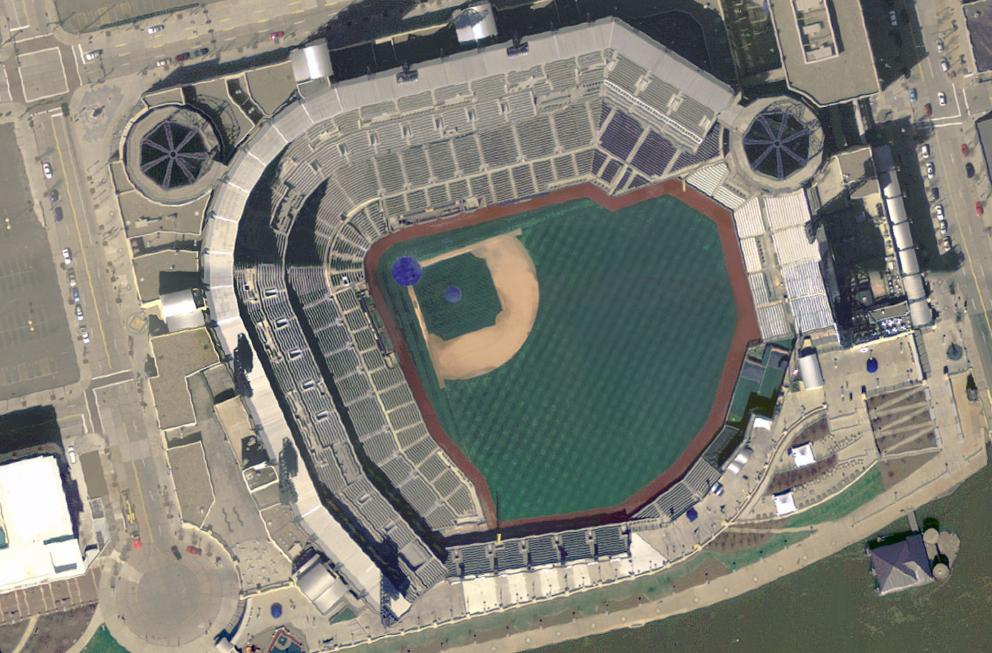
An aerial view of the venue

After a political debate, public money was used to fund PNC Park. Originally, a sales tax increase was proposed to fund three projects: PNC Park, Heinz Field (home of the Steelers, now called Acrisure Stadium), and an expansion of the David L. Lawrence Convention Center. That proposal was soundly rejected in a 1997 referendum known as the Regional Renaissance Initiative.

The city then developed Plan B, which proved similarly controversial. It was labeled Scam B by opponents who said it would consume too much public money; one member of the Allegheny Regional Asset District board called the use of tax dollars "corporate welfare" while others said the Pirates should contribute more than their pledged $40 million. Still, the board approved Plan B on July 9, 1998; it included $228 million for PNC Park in a total package of $809 million. Shortly thereafter, the Pirates made a deal with Pittsburgh city officials to remain in the city until at least 2031.

There was popular sentiment by fans for the Pirates to name the stadium after former outfielder Roberto Clemente. However, locally based PNC Financial Services purchased the stadium's naming rights in August 1998. Under the agreement, PNC Bank paid the Pirates about $2 million each year through 2020; it also maintains a full-service PNC branch at the stadium. The total cost of PNC Park was $216 million. Shortly after the naming rights deal was announced, the city of Pittsburgh renamed the 6th Street Bridge near the southeast corner of the site of the park the Roberto Clemente Bridge as a compromise to fans who had wanted the park named after Clemente.

=== Design and construction ===
Kansas City-based Populous (then HOK Sport), which designed many other major league ballparks of the late 20th and early 21st century, designed the ballpark. The design and construction management team consisted of the Dick Corporation and Barton Malow. An effort was made in the design of PNC Park to salute other "classic style" ballparks, such as Fenway Park, Wrigley Field, and Pittsburgh's Forbes Field; the design of the ballpark's archways, steel truss work, and light standards are results of this goal. PNC Park was the first two-deck ballpark to be built in the United States since Milwaukee County Stadium opened in 1953. The park features a 24 by 42 foot (7.3 by 12.8 m) Sony JumboTron, which is accompanied by the first-ever LED video boards in an outdoor MLB stadium. PNC Park is the first stadium to feature an out-of-town scoreboard with the score, inning, number of outs, and base runners for every other game being played around the league. The out-of-town scoreboard was disabled for the 2022 season and replaced with advertising. After significant fan outcry, the decision was reversed, and the out-of-town scoreboard was returned in 2023.

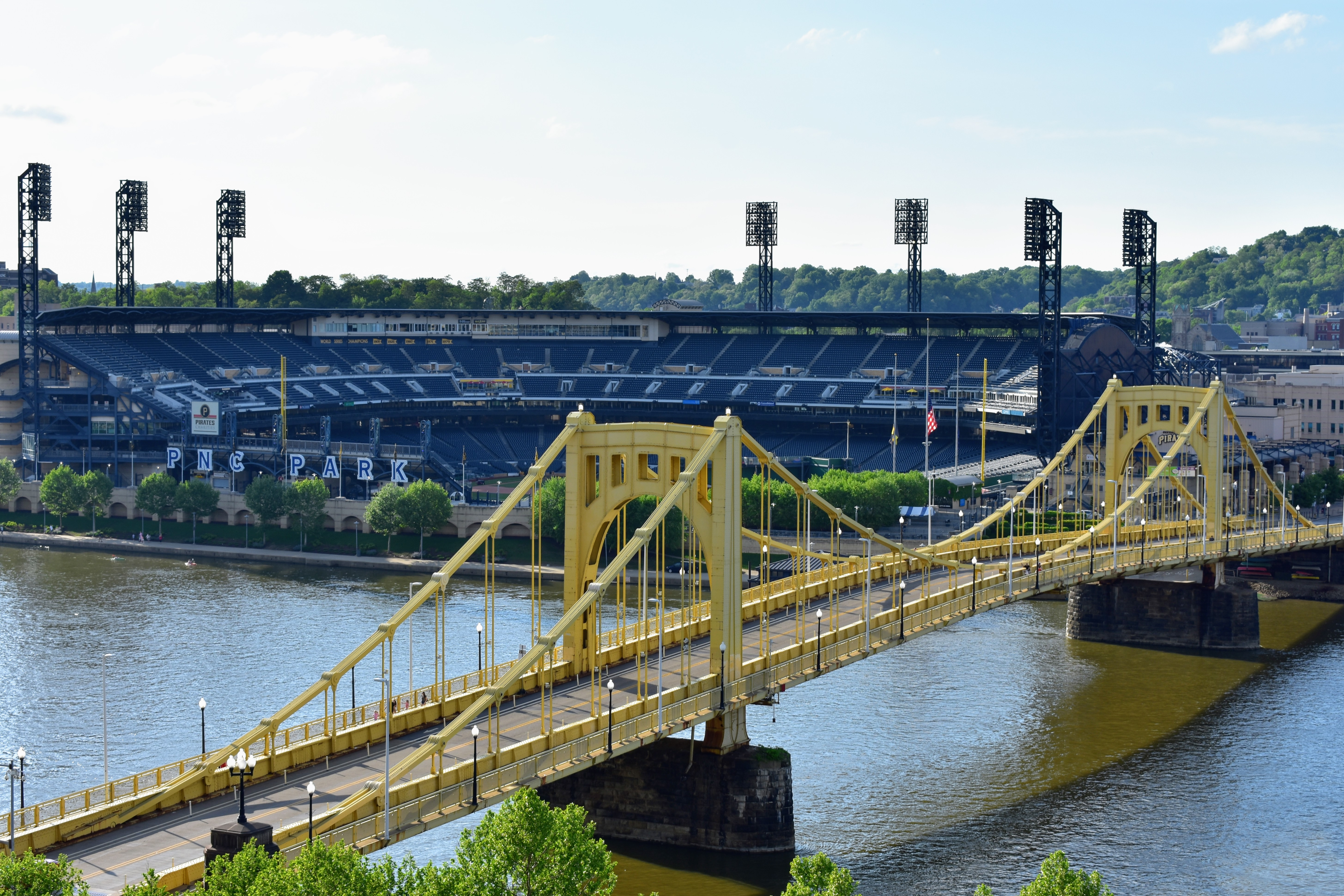
The 6th Street Bridge was renamed the Roberto Clemente Bridge in honor of the former Pirate.

Ground was broken for PNC Park on April 7, 1999, after a ceremony to christen the newly renamed Roberto Clemente Bridge. As part of original plans to create an enjoyable experience for fans, the bridge is closed to vehicular traffic on game days to allow spectators to park in Pittsburgh's Golden Triangle and walk across the bridge to the stadium. PNC Park was built with Kasota limestone shipped from a Minnesota river valley, to contrast the brick bases of other modern stadiums. The American-made raw steel for the ballpark was fabricated in Brownsville, Pennsylvania, by Wilhelm and Krus. The stadium was constructed over a 24-month span—at the time of construction, three months faster than any other modern major league ballpark—and the Pirates played their first game less than two years after groundbreaking. The quick construction was accomplished with the use of special computers, which relayed building plans to builders 24 hours per day. In addition, all 23 labor unions involved in the construction signed a pact that they would not strike during the building process. As a result of union involvement and attention to safety regulations, the construction manager, the Dick Corporation, received a merit award for its safety practices from the Occupational Safety and Health Administration.

=== Statues ===
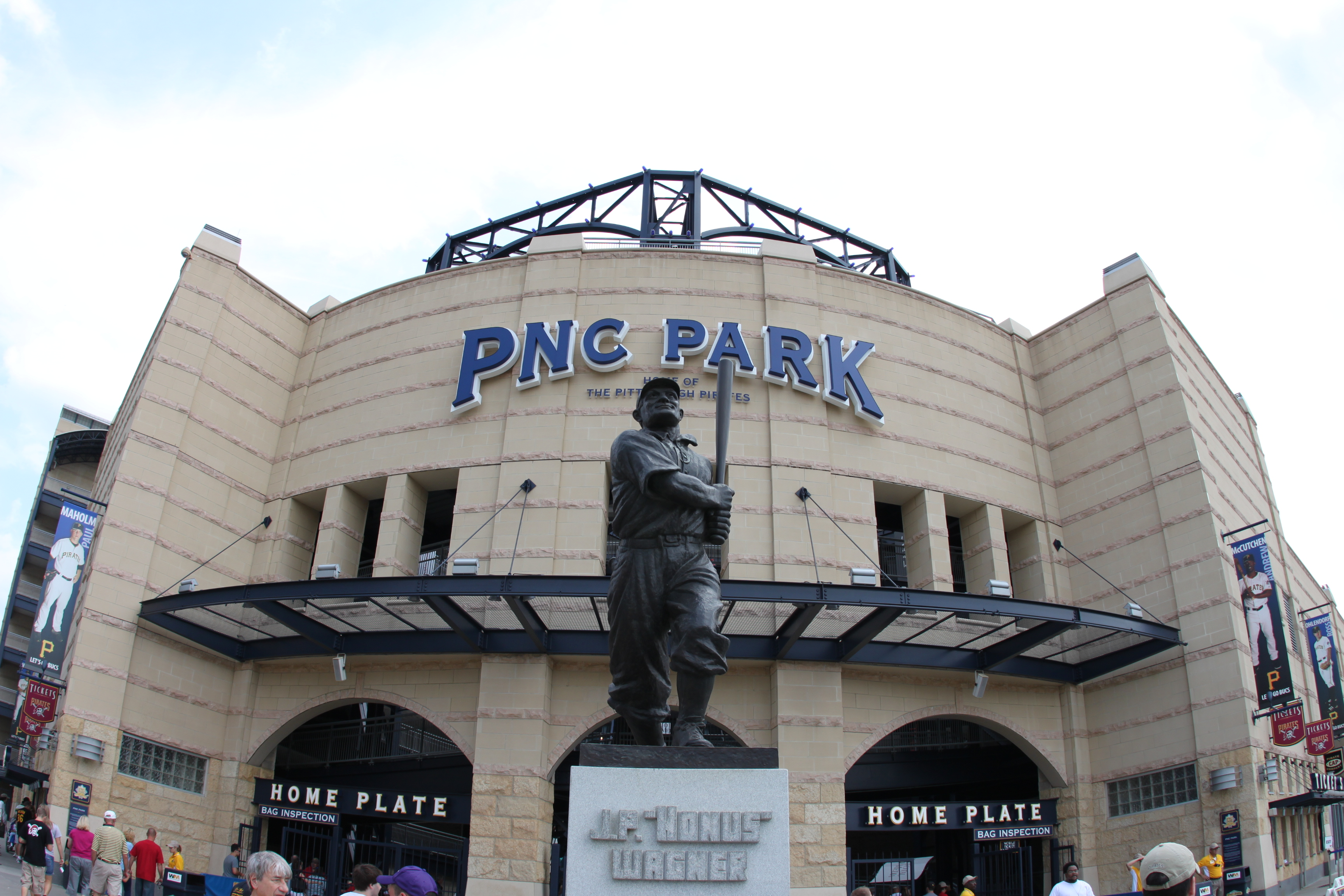
The limestone exterior of the park at the home plate entrance, with a statue of Honus Wagner

Statues of Pirates Hall of Famers Honus Wagner, Roberto Clemente, Willie Stargell, and Bill Mazeroski sit outside of PNC Park.

Wagner's statue, unveiled at Forbes Field in 1955, was later moved to a location outside Three Rivers Stadium. Clemente's statue, installed outside Three Rivers Stadium in 1994, is shaped like a baseball diamond; glass "bases" hold dirt from three of the fields Clemente played at. Both were moved to PNC Park after Three Rivers Stadium was demolished.

On October 1, 2000, after the final game at Three Rivers Stadium, Stargell threw out the ceremonial last pitch. He was presented with a model of a statue that was to be erected in his honor outside PNC Park. Stargell's statue was unveiled on April 7, 2001; however, Stargell did not attend due to health problems and died of a stroke two days later. A statue for Mazeroski was added at the right field entrance, at the south end of Mazeroski Way, during the 2010 season. This was the 50th anniversary of the Pirates' 1960 World Series championship, which Mazeroski clinched with a Game 7 walk-off home run at Forbes Field. The statue itself is based on that event.

=== Opening and reception ===
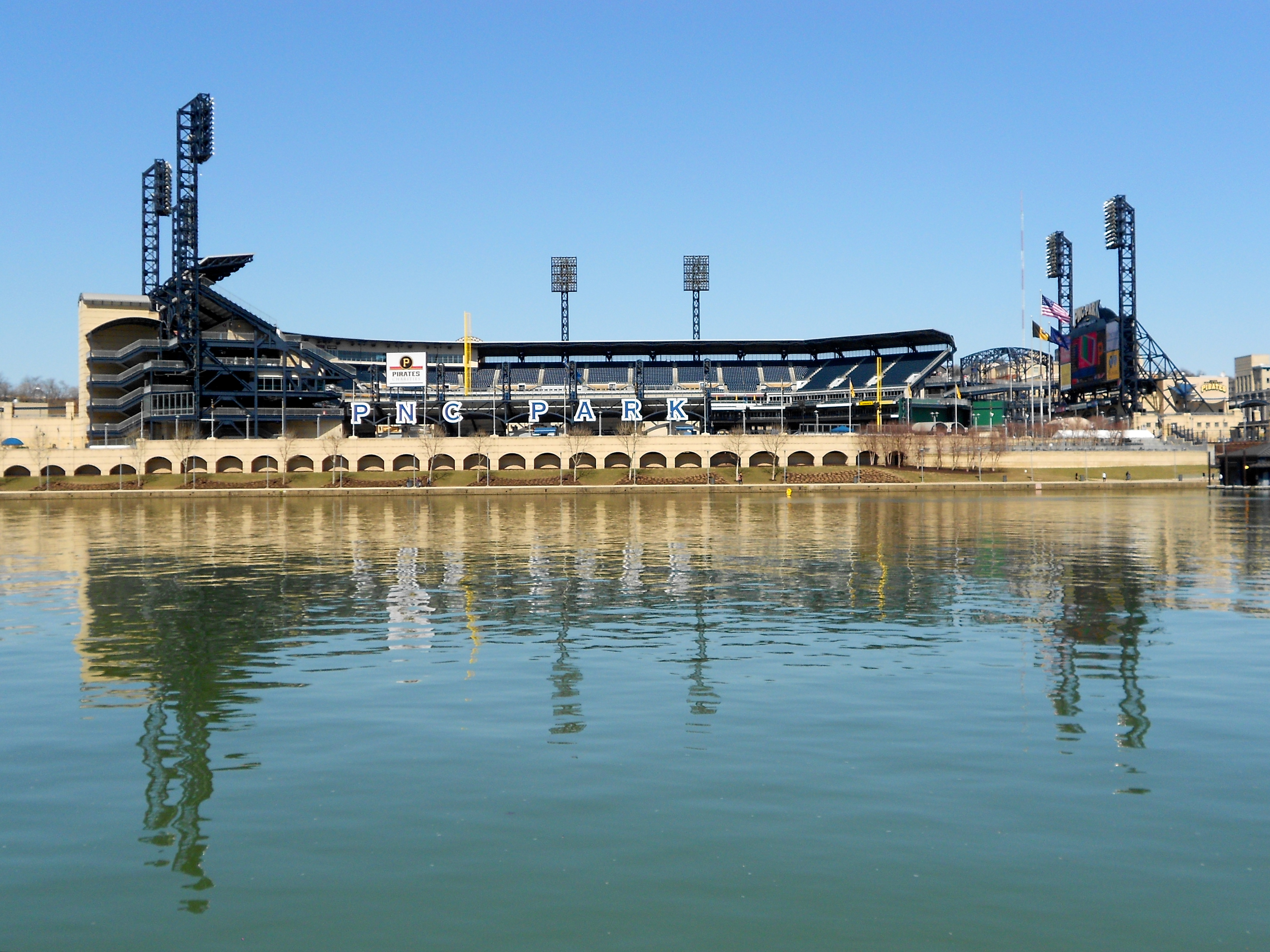
A view of PNC Park from Downtown Pittsburgh across the Allegheny River

The Pirates opened PNC Park with two exhibition games against the New York Mets—the first of which was played on March 31, 2001. The first official baseball game played in PNC Park was between the Cincinnati Reds and the Pirates, on April 9, 2001. The Reds won the game by the final score of 8–2. The first pitch—a ball—was thrown from Pittsburgh's Todd Ritchie to Barry Larkin. In the top of the first inning, Pittsburgh native Sean Casey's two-run home run was the first hit in the park. The first Pirates' batter, Adrian Brown, struck out; however, later in the inning Jason Kendall singled—the first hit by a Pirate in their new stadium.

PNC Park had an average attendance of 30,742 people per game throughout its inaugural season, though it would drop about 27% the following season to 22,594 spectators per game. Throughout the 2001 season, businesses in downtown and on the Northside of Pittsburgh showed a 20–25% increase in business on Pirate game days.

Pirates' vice-president Steve Greenberg said, "We said when construction began that we would build the best ballpark in baseball, and we believe we've done that." Major League Baseball executive Paul Beeston said the park was "the best he's seen so far in baseball". Many of the workers who built the park said that it was the nicest that they had seen. Jason Kendall, Pittsburgh's catcher at the opening of the park, called PNC Park "the most beautiful ballpark in the game". Different elements of PNC Park were used in the design of New York's Citi Field.

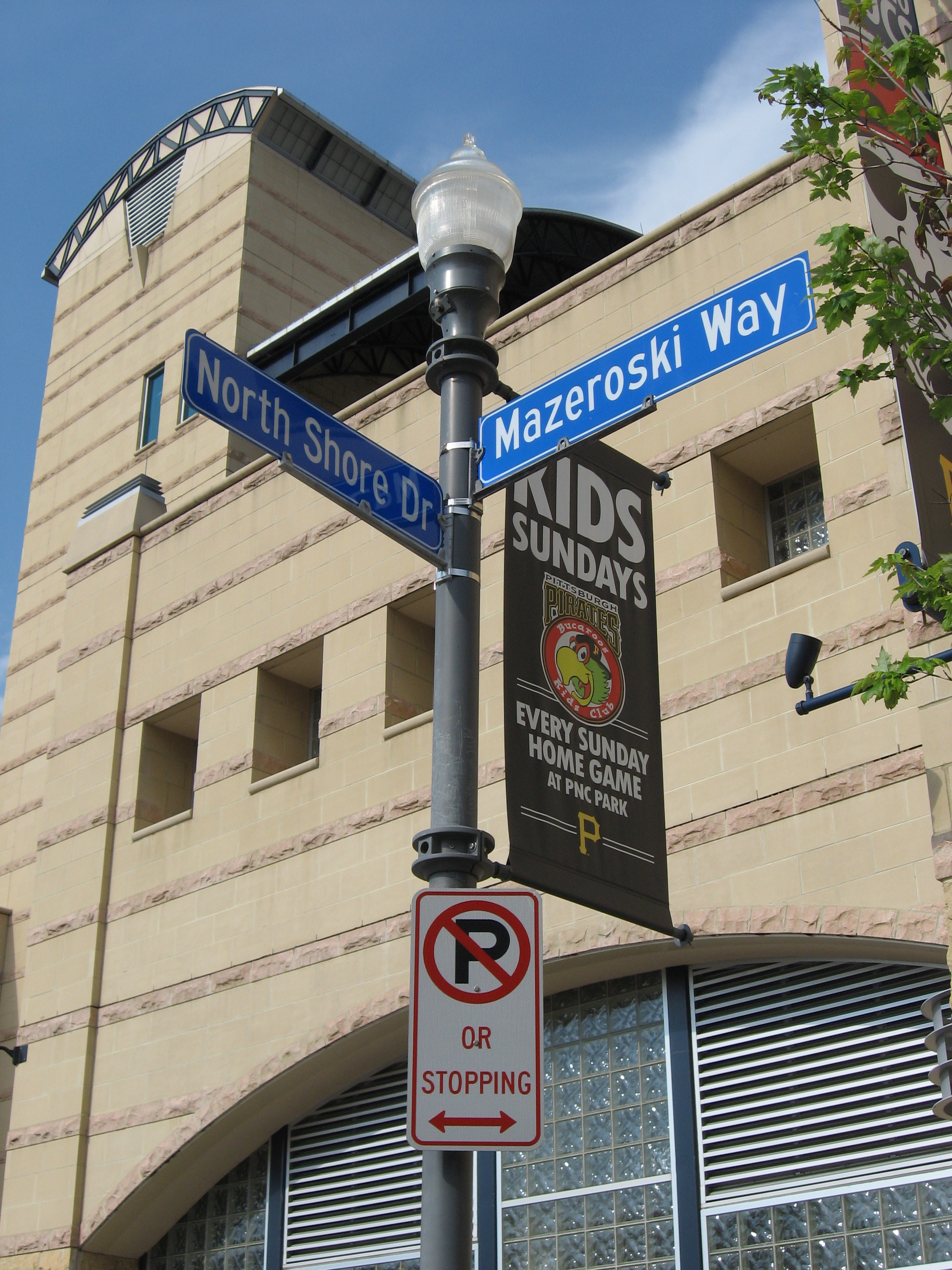
The bordering street Mazeroski Way is named for former Pirate Bill Mazeroski.

Upon opening in 2001, PNC Park was praised by fans and media alike. ESPN.com writer Jim Caple ranked PNC Park as the best stadium in Major League Baseball, with a score of 95 out of 100. Caple compared the park to Frank Lloyd Wright's Fallingwater, calling the stadium itself "perfect", and citing high ticket prices as the only negative aspect of visiting the park. Jay Ahjua, author of Fields of Dreams: A Guide to Visiting and Enjoying All 30 Major League Ballparks, called PNC Park one of the "top ten places to watch the game". Eric Enders, author of Ballparks Then and Now and co-author of Big League Ballparks: The Complete Illustrated History, said it was "everything a baseball stadium could hope to be" and "an immediate contender for the title of best baseball park ever built". In 2008, Men's Fitness named the park one of "10 big league parks worth seeing this summer". A 2010 unranked list of "America's 7 Best Ballparks" published by ABC News noted that PNC Park "combines the best features of yesterday's ballparks—rhythmic archways, steel trusswork and a natural grass playing field—with the latest in fan and player amenities and comfort". In 2017, a panel of Washington Post sports writers ranked it the 2nd-best stadium in MLB. A 2018 article in Parade dubbed PNC Park "The Jewel of the Allegheny".

=== Alterations ===
An exhibit honoring Pittsburgh's Negro league baseball teams was introduced in 2006. Located by the stadium's left-field entrance, the display features statues of seven players who competed for the city's Homestead Grays and Pittsburgh Crawfords, including Josh Gibson and Satchel Paige. The exhibit also includes the Legacy Theatre, a 25-seat facility that plays a film about Pittsburgh's history with the Negro leagues. The Pirates donated the statues to the Josh Gibson Foundation in 2015.

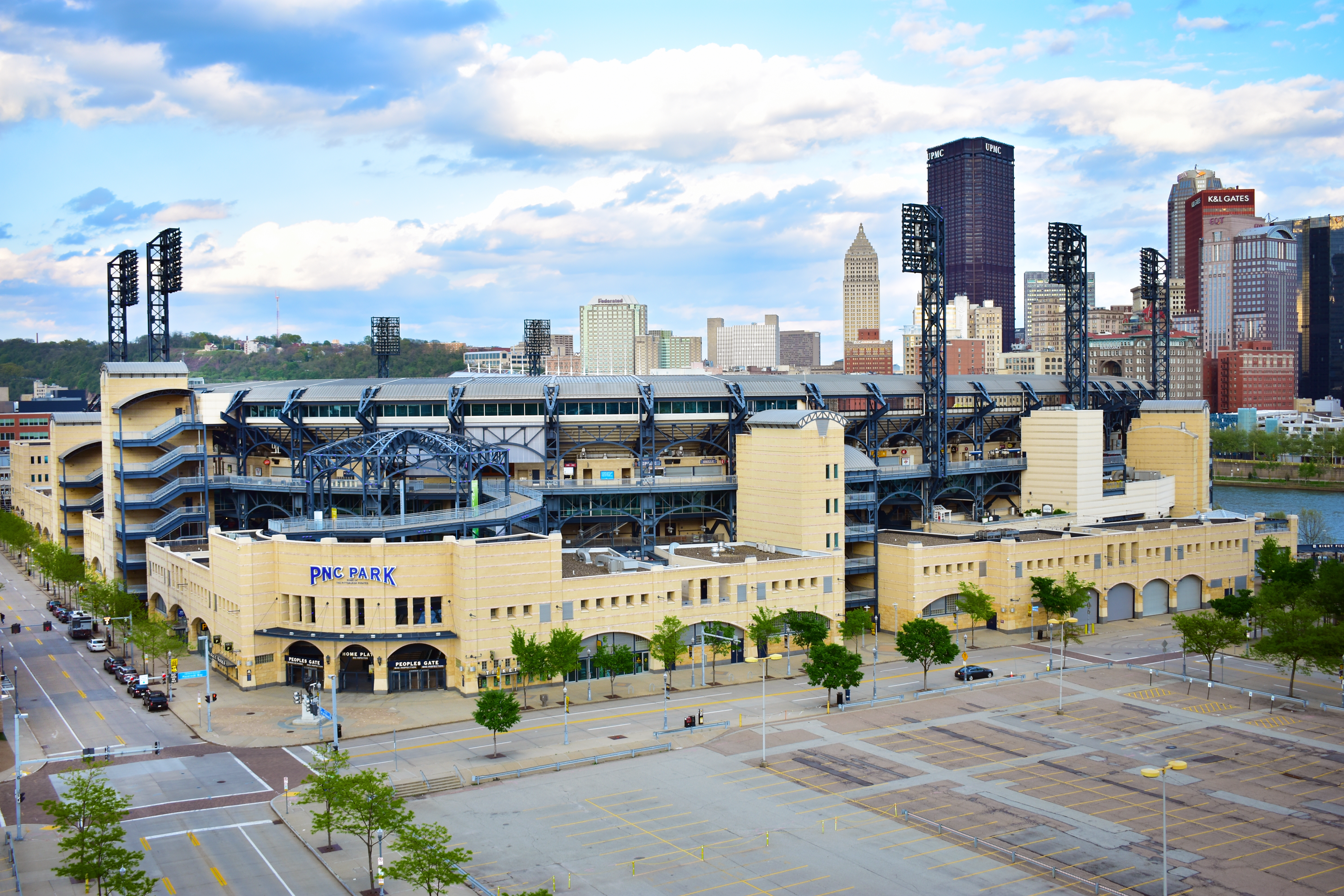
The exterior of PNC Park in May 2020

In 2007, Allegheny County passed a ban on smoking in most public places, thus making PNC Park completely smoke-free. Before the 2008 season, the Pirates made multiple alterations to PNC Park. The biggest change was removing the Outback Steakhouse located in the left field stands, and adding a new restaurant known as The Hall of Fame Club. Unlike its predecessor, The Hall of Fame Club is open to all ticket-holders on game days; it includes an outdoor patio with a bar and seats with a view of the field. The Pirates feature bands in The Hall of Fame Club after the completion of select games—the first performance was by Joe Grushecky and the Houserockers. The Pirates also announced a program to make the park more environmentally friendly, by integrating "greening initiatives, sustainable business practices and educational outreach". In addition, club and suite sections were outfitted with new televisions.

In 2012, the "Budweiser Bow Tie", a 5,000-square-foot (460 m^{2}) bar and lounge located in the right-field corner of the ballpark, was added. The section includes ticketed seats as well as areas for groups and the general public. This addition was expected to cost about $1 million.

Improvements made for the 2015 season include the left-field terrace between the left-field bleachers and the Rivertowne Brewing Hall of Fame Club. Its two levels for standing room, including 250 feet (76 m) of drink rails, are open to any fan with a ticket. Added next to the terraces was "The Porch", a patio that overlooks the center field and has bar tables and outdoor sofa-style seating and accommodates groups of 25 people. Other 2015 additions include The Corner, a bar at the base of the left-field rotunda with nine flat-screen TVs; Terrace Bar, a bar in the upper concourse; and Pirates Outfitters, a merchandise shop next to the home-plate entrance. The Pirates paid all costs for the additions to the park.

Before the 2017 season, the manual out-of-town scoreboard on the right-field wall was replaced by an LED screen.

Improvements for the 2022 season included the replacement of several rows of seats in center field and the security booth located next to the batter's eye by two open-air bars, where fans can watch the game while ordering drinks. A pirate-ship-themed playground for kids was added in this area, along with signs and plaques detailing the club's history and five championships. Outside the park, the Pirates added a display near the Center Field entrance commemorating the team's retired numbers, and large baseballs along the Allegheny River bearing the names of Pittsburgh-based members of the Baseball Hall of Fame, including players from the local Negro league franchises, the Homestead Grays and Pittsburgh Crawfords. In September 2022, the Pirates unveiled their own Hall of Fame, located in the Legacy Square area of the ballpark near the left field rotunda. The inaugural class featured 15 members.

Ahead of the 2023 season, the Pirates replaced and expanded the main scoreboard.

== Notable events ==
=== Baseball ===
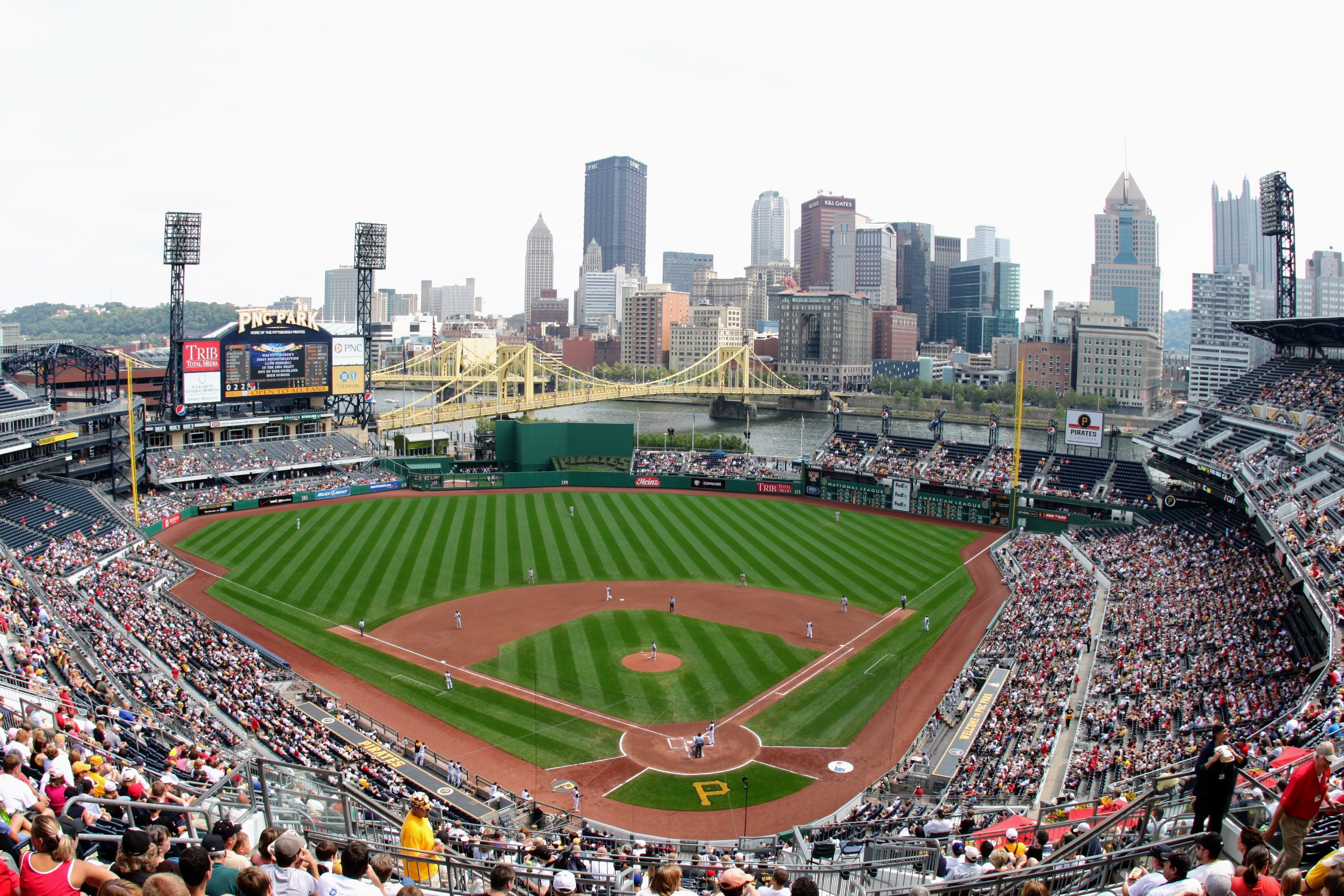
PNC Park hosting a game in 2009

PNC Park hosted the 77th Major League Baseball All-Star Game on July 11, 2006. The American League defeated the National League 3–2, with 38,904 spectators in attendance. The first All-Star Game in PNC Park, it was the 5th All-Star Game hosted in Pittsburgh, and the first since 1994. During the game, late Pirate Roberto Clemente was honored with the Commissioner's Historic Achievement Award; his wife, Vera, accepted on his behalf. The stadium hosted the Home Run Derby the previous evening; Ryan Howard, of the Philadelphia Phillies, won the title. During the Derby, Howard and David Ortiz hit home runs into the Allegheny River.

PNC Park saw its first no-hitter when Reds pitcher Homer Bailey no-hit the Pirates, 1–0 on September 28, 2012. PNC Park has yet to see a no-hitter or perfect game thrown by a Pirate.

The Pirates hosted the Cincinnati Reds on October 1, 2013, in the 2013 National League Wild Card Game. This marked the first time a playoff game was played at PNC Park. The Pirates won 6–2, their first postseason victory since 1992, in front of a record crowd of 40,629. The 2014 and 2015 National League Wild Card games were also played at PNC Park.

It was reported on July 20, 2020, that the Pirates were exploring offering use of PNC Park as a temporary home stadium for the Toronto Blue Jays for the 2020 MLB season, as the team was unable to obtain clearance from the Canadian government to play at Rogers Centre under travel restrictions issued because of the COVID-19 pandemic. Team GM Ben Cherington worked for the Blue Jays before being hired by the Pirates. On July 22, 2020, the Toronto Blue Jays were denied permission to play home games at PNC Park by Pennsylvania Department of Health Secretary Dr. Rachel Levine and Pennsylvania Governor Tom Wolf.

On April 30, 2025, a fan fell from the right-field stands onto the field during a game between the Pirates and Chicago Cubs.

=== College baseball ===
The first collegiate baseball game at PNC Park was played on May 6, 2003, between the Pitt Panthers and the Duquesne Dukes, who won 2–1. Dubbed the City Game, it was played annually (except in 2007, when the game was canceled because of poor field conditions) through 2010, at which point Pitt had won four games and Duquesne two. Duquesne disbanded their baseball program after the 2010 season.

=== Banana Ball ===
PNC Park hosted two nights of the 2025 Banana Ball World Tour on August 29 and 30 featuring the flagship Savannah Bananas facing the Texas Tailgaters.

=== Concerts ===
PNC Park has hosted many touring artists and musicians, including Rolling Rock Town Fair, Bruce Springsteen & The E Street Band, Styx, Jason Aldean, Billy Joel, Elton John, The Rolling Stones, Pearl Jam, Jimmy Buffett, Me First and the Gimme Gimmes, Dave Matthews Band, Ed Sheeran, Zac Brown Band, Green Day, Fall Out Boy, Weezer, Metallica, Def Leppard and Mötley Crüe.

On August 5, 2023, Pink became the first woman to headline the stadium.

On July 3, 2026, Noah Kahan broke the attendance record with 42,633 fans.

=== In film ===
The park served as a location for the films She's Out of My League (2010), Abduction (2011), Jack Reacher (2012) and Sweet Girl (2021).

=== Other events ===
PNC Park has hosted drills to practice evacuation and other responses to a terrorist attack. Members of the United States Department of Homeland Security laid out the groundwork for the initial drill in February 2004. In May 2005, 5,000 volunteers participated in the $1 million evacuation drill, which included mock explosions. A goal of the drill was to test the response of 49 western Pennsylvania emergency agencies. In April 2006, the Department of Homeland Security worked with the United States Coast Guard to develop a plan of response for the 2006 All-Star Game. Similar exercises were conducted on the Allegheny River in 2007.

== Special features ==
=== Playing surface and dimensions ===
A schematic of PNC Park

The original playing surface of sand-based natural grass was replaced before the 2006 season.

Installed for the 2009 season, the current grass is Tuckahoe Bluegrass, a mixture of various types of Kentucky Bluegrass, selected for its "high-quality pedigree that is ideal for Northern cities such as Pittsburgh". The infield dirt is a mixture known as "Dura Edge Custom Pro Infield Mix" and was designed for PNC Park. The 18-foot (5.5 m) warning track is crushed lava rock. The drainage system underneath the field can drain 14 inches (36 cm) of rain per hour.

The playing surface was renovated after the 2016 season. The top 3 inches (7.6 cm) of rootzone soil was replaced, the surface graded with a laser, new Kentucky bluegrass sod was installed. The infield skin was excavated to a depth of 4 inches (10 cm) and replaced with new Dura Edge infield mix.

Unlike most ballparks, PNC Park's home dugout is located along the third base line instead of the first base line; giving the home team a view of the city skyline. The outfield fence ranges from a height of 6 feet (2 m) in left field to 10 feet (3 m) in center field and 21 feet (6 m) in right field, a tribute to former Pirate right fielder Roberto Clemente, who wore number 21. The distance from home plate to the outfield fence ranges from 320 feet (98 m) in right field to 410 feet (125 m) in left center; the straightaway center field fence is set at 399 feet (122 m). At its closest point, the Allegheny River is 443 ft 4 in (135.128 m) from the plate. On July 6, 2002, Daryle Ward became the first player to hit the river "on the fly". On June 2, 2013, Garrett Jones became the second player and the first Pirate to accomplish the feat. On May 19, 2015, Pirates first baseman Pedro Alvarez became the third person to do this, although the ball landed in a boat on the river rather than in the water. Between May 8 and May 22, 2019, Pirates first baseman Josh Bell splashed the fourth and fifth home runs into the Allegheny River; the first one is estimated to have traveled farther than 470 feet (143 m); the second, more than 450 feet (137 m). The longest home run in PNC Park history was 484 feet (148 m), hit to left-center field by Sammy Sosa on April 12, 2002. On June 30, 2023, Carlos Santana became the fifth person to accomplish this feat when he hit a walk-off home run to win.

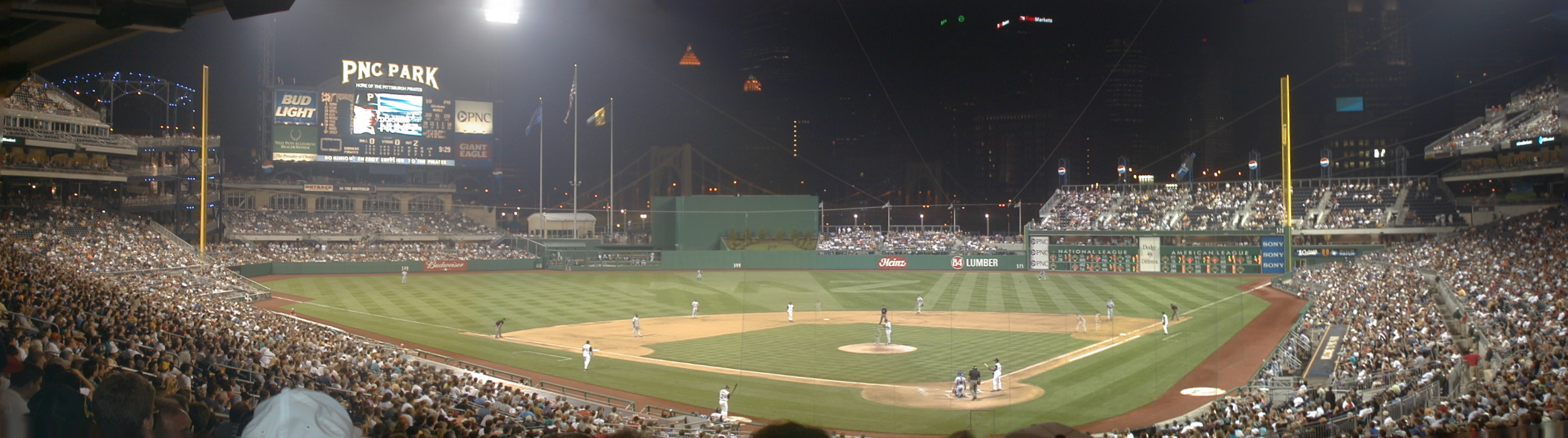
An evening game between the Los Angeles Dodgers and Pittsburgh Pirates – August 7, 2001

=== Seating, attendance, and ticket prices ===
During its opening season, PNC Park's seating capacity of 38,496 was the second-smallest of any major league stadium, after Fenway Park. Seats are angled toward the field and aisles are lowered to give spectators improved views of the field. The majority of the seats (26,000) are on the first level, and the highest seat in the stadium is 88 feet (27 m) above the playing surface. At 51 feet (16 m), the batter is closer to the seats behind home plate than to the pitcher. At their closest point, seating along the baselines is 45 feet (14 m) from the bases. The four-level steel rotunda and a section above the out-of-town scoreboard offer standing-room-only space. With the exception of the bleacher sections, all seats in the park offer a view of Pittsburgh's skyline.

In its opening season, PNC Park's tickets were priced between $9 and $35 for general admission. One of only two teams not to increase ticket prices entering the 2009 season, PNC Park ranked as having the third-cheapest average ticket prices in the league in 2009. Despite price increases in the 2015 season, the average ticket price at PNC Park remained in the bottom five among MLB teams. The stadium's average ticket price held between $15 and $17 from 2006 to 2013 (among the lowest in Major League Baseball), then rose to $18.32 in 2014, $19.99 in 2015, and $29.96 in 2016.

In the stadium's first decade, average attendance dipped under 20,000 fans per game four times. Before 2013, the Pirates had only one winning record since 1992. Through 2004, 5% of games played at PNC Park were sold out. The number of sellouts increased in 2012 and 2013; after filling PNC Park 17 times in 2012, the team played to capacity crowds at 23 games in 2013. In 2014, average attendance crossed the 30,000 mark for the first time since PNC Park's inaugural season in 2001, and remained above 30,000 in 2015 before dropping to 27,000 in 2016.

=== Eateries ===
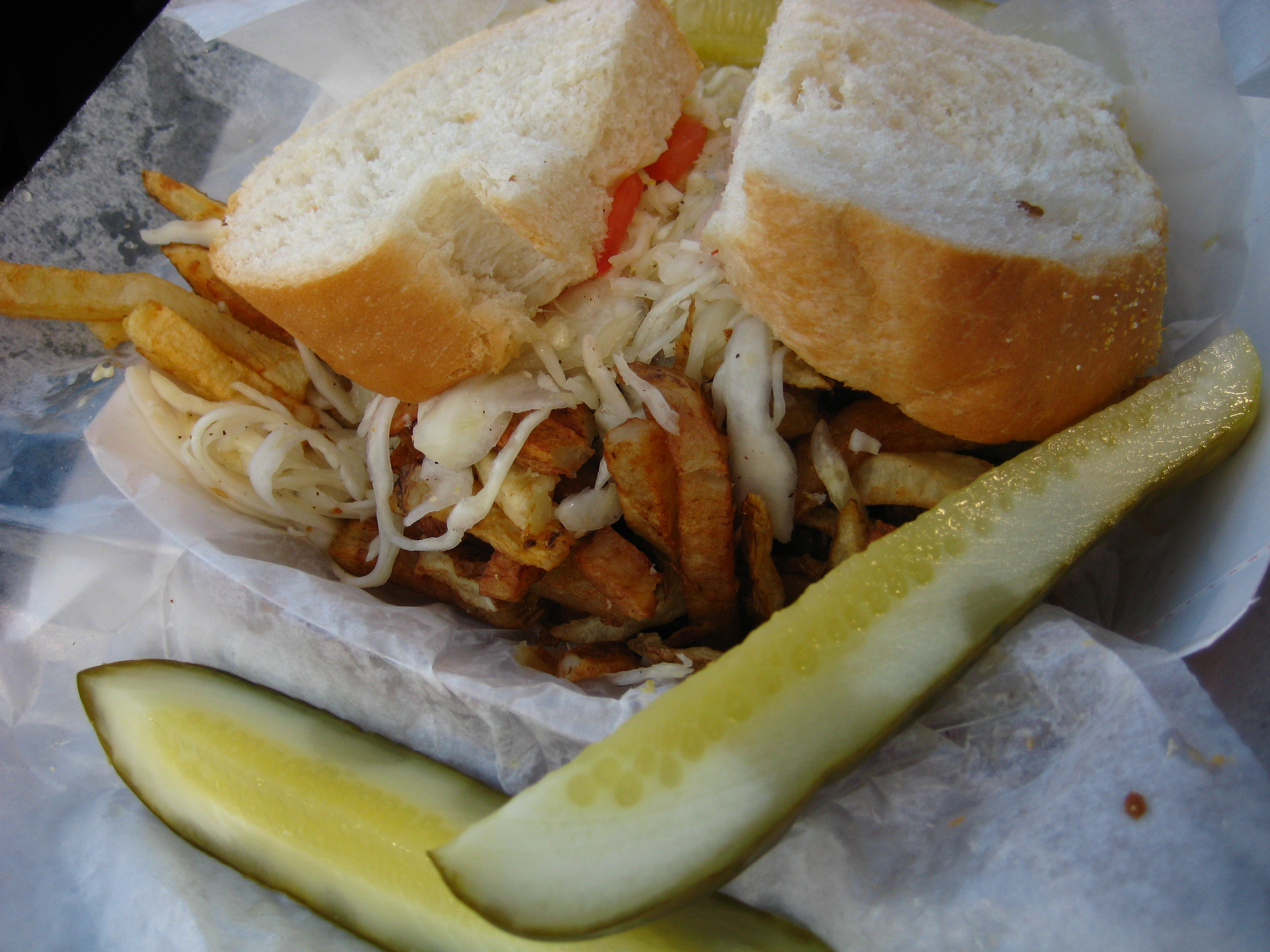
A traditional Primanti Brothers sandwich

The main eating concourse, known as "Tastes of Pittsburgh", features a wide range of options including traditional ballpark foods, hometown specialties, and more exotic fare like sushi. Pittsburgh's hometown specialties include Primanti Brothers sandwiches, whose signature item consists of meat, cheese, hand-cut French fries, tomatoes, and coleslaw between two slices of Italian bread. Other local eateries offered include Mrs. T's Pierogies, Quaker Steak & Lube, Augustine's Pizza, and Benkovitz Seafood. Located behind center field seating is Manny's BBQ, which offers various barbecue meals. It is named for former Pirates' catcher Manny Sanguillén, who has been known to sign autographs for fans waiting in line. For the 2008 season, the Pirates created an all-you-can-eat section in the right field corner. Fans seated in the section are allowed "unlimited hot dogs, hamburgers, nachos, salads, popcorn, peanuts, ice cream and pop" for an entire game. In addition to the food offered, fans are free to bring their own food into the stadium, a rarity among the league's ballparks.

For its first 13 years, PNC Park sold Pepsi products, a contrast from its predecessor Three Rivers Stadium, which sold Coca-Cola products, as well as Heinz Field and Mellon Arena. In right field, several versions of the Pepsi Globe as well as a Pepsi bottle were displayed on large posts behind the stands and lit up every time the Pirates hit a home run. In 2014, the Pirates switched to Coca-Cola. The Pepsi signage in right field was converted into advertising for locally based health insurance company Highmark.

In 2016, PNC Park made news with their introduction of the "Cracker Jack & Mac Dog". The foot-long all-beef hot dog was topped with macaroni and cheese, salted caramel sauce, deep-fried pickled jalapeños and a side of caramel-covered popcorn. Instead of a bun, naan bread was used to hold everything together.

=== Contractors ===
As with its predecessor, PNC Park's concessions service provider is Aramark, while the premium seating areas (the PBC Level, the Suites Level and formerly, the Lexus Club) are serviced by Levy Restaurants. In 2019, the Lexus Club was replaced by the Hyundai Club and Aramark took over food service.

=== Public address announcers ===
From its opening until 2021, Tim DeBacco served as PNC Park's public address announcer. He is famous for his opening "Good evening, ladies and gentlemen, boys and girls and welcome to PNC Park", and signing off "Thank you, and good night." After retirement in 2022, various Pittsburgh personalities including Guy Junker, Adam Gusky, Larry Richert, and Dave Cawley served as guest announcers. Junker became public address announcer for the 2023 season with Joe Klimchak and Debbie Becker serving as the co-announcers. Klimchak became the main public address announcer for the 2024 season while Junker is limited to in-game activities and announcing the starting lineups.

=== Organ music ===
All of the organ music at PNC Park is performed by Vince Lascheid, who served as the organist for the Pirates until his death in 2009. Digital recordings of his music continued to be played afterwards, including his rendition of "Take Me Out to the Ball Game".

== Transportation access ==
PNC Park is located at exit 1B of Interstate 279 and within 1 mile (1.6 km) of both Interstate 376 and Interstate 579. The park is also served by the North Side transit station of the Pittsburgh subway system.

== Climate ==
PNC Park

Climate chart (precipitation, max. and min. temperature)
| J | F | M | A | M | J | J | A | S | O | N | D |
| 106 −1 −6 | 93 1 −8 | 92 12 0 | 96 24 7 | 118 25 10 | 138 29 16 | 172 29 18 | 135 29 21 | 81 26 14 | 106 19 8 | 68 11 2 | 126 1 −3 |
- █ Average max. and min. temperatures in °C
- █ Precipitation totals in mm
Imperial conversion
| J | F | M | A | M | J | J | A | S | O | N | D |
| 4.2 30 21 | 3.7 34 18 | 3.6 54 32 | 3.8 75 45 | 4.6 77 50 | 5.4 84 61 | 6.8 84 64 | 5.3 84 70 | 3.2 79 57 | 4.2 66 46 | 2.7 52 36 | 5 34 27 |
- █ Average max. and min. temperatures in °F
- █ Precipitation totals in inches

Events and tenants
| Preceded by Three Rivers Stadium | Home of the Pittsburgh Pirates; 2001 – present | Succeeded by Current |
| Preceded by Comerica Park | Host of the MLB All-Star Game; 2006 | Succeeded by AT&T Park |
| Preceded by Turner Field | Host of the National League Wild Card Game; 2013; 2014; 2015 | Succeeded by Citi Field |
