= Augustine's Pizza =

Frozen food company in Pennsylvania, US

Augustine’s Italian Village (Augustine’s Pizza)
- Company type: Private
- Industry: Frozen Food
- Founded: New Castle, Pennsylvania, United States (1957)
- Headquarters: New Castle, Pennsylvania, United States
- Area served: Pennsylvania, Ohio
- Products: Frozen Pizza, Bread
- Website: www.AugustinesPizza.com

Augustine's Italian Village, Inc. is a regional frozen food company located in New Castle, Pennsylvania, United States, part of the Pittsburgh metropolitan area. Augustine's Frozen Pizza can be found in Grocery and convenience stores throughout western Pennsylvania and eastern Ohio.

== History ==
Augustine's Italian Village was started in 1957. The original site was 1909 E. Washington Street in New Castle, Pennsylvania (across from Cascade Park). Augustine's Italian Village then moved to 833 E. Lutton Street, New Castle, Pennsylvania, in 1960. On November 8, 2015, Augustine's Italian Village had a fire and lost everything. They reopened and move to 427 Commerce Avenue, which is now their current location.

Since the fire, Augustine's Italian Village no longer has a take out restaurant.

== Products ==
Augustine's Pizza manufactures six products for grocery stores, convenience stores, restaurants, schools, and concession stands. They are a 12" plain (grated Parmesan cheese) pizza, a 12" mozzarella cheese pizza, a 7" mozzarella cheese "Stadium" pizza, Syrian bread, spinach and cheese calzone, pepperoni and cheese calzone, and pizza shells.

== Advertising and sponsorship ==
Beginning in the spring of 2011 Augustine's Pizza was contracted to supply Aramark concessions at PNC Park in Pittsburgh, Pennsylvania, the home of the Pittsburgh Pirates of Major League Baseball. On August 19, 2011, Augustine's Pizza sponsored a free T-shirt giveaway promotion at PNC Park, which featured Pirates centerfielder Andrew McCutchen on the front of the shirt, and the Augustine's Pizza logo on the back.
