= Willie Stargell =

American baseball player (1940–2001)

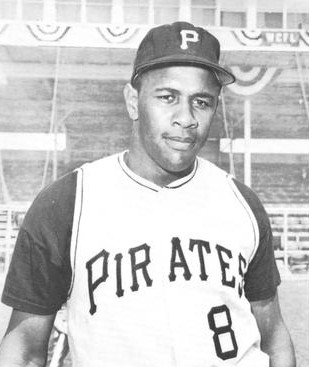
- Stargell with the Pittsburgh Pirates in 1965
- Left fielder / First baseman
- Born: March 6, 1940; Earlsboro, Oklahoma, U.S.
- Died: April 9, 2001 (aged 61); Wilmington, North Carolina, U.S.
- Batted: Left Threw: Left

MLB debut
- September 16, 1962, for the Pittsburgh Pirates

Last MLB appearance
- October 3, 1982, for the Pittsburgh Pirates

MLB statistics
- Batting average: .282
- Hits: 2,232
- Home runs: 475
- Runs batted in: 1,540
- Stats at Baseball Reference

Teams
- Pittsburgh Pirates (1962–1982)

Career highlights and awards
- 7× All-Star (1964–1966, 1971–1973, 1978); 2× World Series champion (1971, 1979); NL MVP (1979); World Series MVP (1979); NLCS MVP (1979); Roberto Clemente Award (1974); 2× NL home run leader (1971, 1973); NL RBI leader (1973); Pittsburgh Pirates No. 8 retired; Pittsburgh Pirates Hall of Fame

Member of the National

Baseball Hall of Fame
- Induction: 1988
- Vote: 82.4% (first ballot)

Wilver Dornell Stargell (March 6, 1940 – April 9, 2001), nicknamed "Pops" later in his career, was an American professional baseball left fielder and first baseman who spent all of his 21 seasons in Major League Baseball (MLB) (1962–1982) with the Pittsburgh Pirates. Among the most feared power hitters in baseball history, Stargell had the most home runs (296) of any player in the 1970s. During his career, he batted .282 with 2,232 hits, 1,194 runs, 423 doubles, 475 home runs, and 1,540 runs batted in, helping his team win six National League (NL) East division titles, two NL pennants, and two World Series championships in 1971 and 1979, both over the Baltimore Orioles. Stargell was a seven-time All-Star and two-time NL home run leader. In 1979, at the age of 39, he became the first and currently only player to win the NL Most Valuable Player (MVP) Award, the NL Championship Series MVP Award and the World Series MVP Award in one season. In 1982, the Pirates retired his uniform number 8. He was inducted into the Baseball Hall of Fame in 1988 in his first year of eligibility.

== Early life ==
Stargell was born in Earlsboro, Oklahoma, but later moved to Florida with an aunt after his parents divorced. Later, he returned to Alameda, California, to live with his mother. He attended Encinal High School, where his baseball teammates included future MLB players Tommy Harper and Curt Motton. Stargell signed with the Pittsburgh Pirates organization and entered minor league baseball in 1959.

Stargell played for farm teams in New Mexico, North Dakota, Iowa, Texas, North Carolina, and Ohio. While on the road with some of those teams, Stargell was not allowed to stay in the same accommodations as the white players. Lodging for black players was located in the poor black areas of those towns. While in Plainview, Texas, he was accosted at gunpoint by a man who threatened his life if he played in that night's game. Stargell played and nothing came of the incident. He might have quit baseball over the racial difficulties that he experienced, but he was encouraged by letters he received from friend and baseball scout Bob Zuk.

== Professional career ==
Beloved in Pittsburgh for his style of play and affable manner, Stargell hit seven of the 18 balls ever hit over Forbes Field's 86-foot-high right-field stands and several of the upper-tier home runs at its successor, Three Rivers Stadium. Though he became quickly known as Willie Stargell, his autograph suggests that he preferred his given name, Wilver. Biographer Frank Garland relates that Stargell's family and friends called him Wilver and that Dodgers broadcaster Vin Scully also made a point of using Stargell's given name. Scully said that because he used the name Wilver, he became Stargell's mother's favorite broadcaster.

Standing 6 ft 3 in (1.91 m) with long arms and a unique bat-handling practice of holding only the knob of the bat with his lower hand to provide extra bat extension, Stargell seemed larger than most batters. Stargell's swings seemed designed to hit home runs of Ruthian proportions. When most batters used a simple lead-weighted bat in the on-deck circle, Stargell took to warming up with a sledgehammer. While standing in the batter's box, he would windmill his bat until the pitcher started his windup.

=== 1960s ===
Stargell made his MLB debut at the end of the 1962 season at the age of 22. His 1963 rookie season was lackluster, but he enjoyed much more success the following season, his first as an everyday player. Stargell began and ended the season as the Pirates' everyday left-fielder, but spent extended periods playing first base as well. He hit the first home run at Shea Stadium in the first game played in that stadium on April 17, 1964. He made his first of seven trips to the All-Star Game that year. He returned to the All-Star Game the next two seasons, recording over 100 runs batted in (RBIs) in both years, and finishing respectively 14th and 15th in MVP voting. He won the first of the three NL Player of the Month awards of his career in June 1965 (.330, 10 HRs, 35 RBIs).

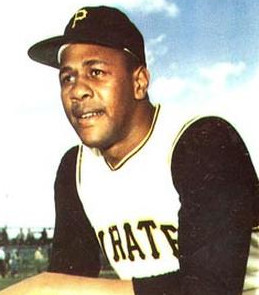
Stargell during his early seasons with Pittsburgh in 1966

Frequent offseason conditioning problems came to a head in 1967, when Stargell showed up to spring training at a weight of 235 pounds. The team mandated that he diet to get down to a weight of 215 pounds. His batting average dropped more than 40 points that season from .315 in 1966 to .271 in 1967; his home run total was reduced from 33 in 1966 to 20 in 1967. The team had a personal trainer work with Stargell before the 1968 season to get him in the best shape of his career, but Stargell had a poor season and manager Larry Shepard criticized Stargell's physique as too muscular. He finished out the decade with a strong performance in 1969 (.307, 29 HRs, 92 RBIs), and finished 21st in MVP voting.

=== 1970s ===
Stargell enjoyed another fine season in 1970, batting .264 with 31 home runs and 85 RBIs and finishing 15th in MVP voting. On August 1 of that year, Stargell collected five extra-base hits—three doubles and two home runs—in the Pirates' 20–10 victory over the Atlanta Braves at Fulton County Stadium. He became the third player, after Lou Boudreau in 1946 and Joe Adcock in 1954, to collect five extra-base hits in one game. The game was a Saturday Game of the Week on network television, and ironically the trivia question during the broadcast was "Who are the two players with five extra-base hits in one game?" Stargell became the third in that very game. In the same game, teammate Bob Robertson also collected five hits, including a home run; not until Andrew McCutchen and Garrett Jones in 2012 would two Pirates collect five hits in the same game. The 1970 Pirates won the National League East title for their first postseason berth since winning the 1960 World Series. They were swept in that year's NLCS by the Cincinnati Reds, but not before Stargell collected six hits in 12 at-bats, the most hits by either team in this series.

Stargell's career moved to another level in 1971. At age 31, he won the first of his two home-run titles in 1971; his 48 edged out Hank Aaron's 47 on the final week of the season and, to date, trail only Ralph Kiner's 54 and 51 in 1949 and 1947, respectively, for most by a Pirate in one season. He won the final two NL Player of the Month awards of his career in April (.347, 11 HR, 27 RBIs) and in June (.333, 11 HR, 36 RBIs); yet he did not win the MVP award, finishing second to Joe Torre. Also in April, Stargell hit 3 home runs in a game twice, on April 10 at Atlanta and on April 21 at home. In seven of the next nine seasons, Stargell finished in the top 10 in MVP voting, as his career moved onto a Hall of Fame track.

He was a member of the Pirates' World Championship team, the Pirates defeating the Baltimore Orioles in seven games. The Pirates lost the first two games of that series, which Stargell said that media began referring to as "the St. Valentine's Day Massacre" before Pittsburgh's comeback.

Stargell continued to post excellent numbers in 1972 (.293, 33, 112) finishing third in MVP voting behind Johnny Bench and Billy Williams.

In 1973, Stargell achieved the rare feat of simultaneously leading the league in both doubles and homers. Stargell had more than 40 of each; he was the first player to chalk up this 40-40 accomplishment since Hank Greenberg in 1940; other players have done so since (notably Albert Belle, the only 50-50 player). Stargell won his second home-run title that year, edging out three Atlanta Braves: Davey Johnson's 43, Darrell Evans' 41 and Aaron's 40. He also led the league in runs batted in and slugging percentage. For the third year in a row, he was narrowly edged out of the MVP award.

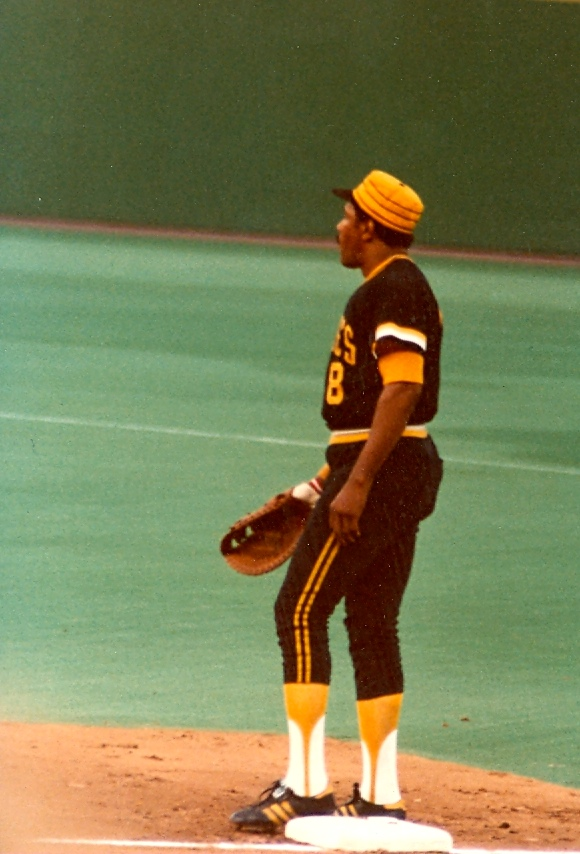
Stargell playing first base for the Pirates in 1979.

Beginning in 1975, after years of experimenting at the position, Stargell moved permanently to first base. He never played another game in the outfield.

In 1977, Stargell hit his 400th career home run on June 29 against the St. Louis Cardinals.

Stargell originated the practice of giving his teammates embroidered "Stargell stars" for their caps after a nice play or a good game. The practice began during the turbulent 1978 season, when the Pirates came from fourth place and 11.5 games behind in mid-August, to challenge the first-place Philadelphia Phillies for the division title. The season was scheduled to end in a dramatic, four-game showdown against the Phillies in Pittsburgh, in which the Pirates had to win all four games to claim the title. Following a Pirate sweep of the Friday-night double-header, Stargell belted a grand slam in the bottom of the first inning of the season's penultimate game to give the Pirates an early 4–1 lead, although the Pirates relinquished that lead later in the game and fell two runs short after a four-run rally in the bottom of the ninth inning, thus eliminating themselves from contention for the pennant. Stargell called that 1978 team his favorite team ever, and predicted that the Pirates would win the World Series the following year.

The Pirates did win the World Series in 1979, in a similar style as they had ended the 1978 season: from last place in the NL East at the end of April, the Pirates clawed their way into a first-place battle with the Montreal Expos during the latter half of the season. They excited fans with numerous come-from-behind victories along the way (many during their final at-bat) to claim the division pennant on the last day of the season. At his urging as captain, the team adopted the Sister Sledge hit song "We Are Family" as the team anthem. Then, his play on the field inspired his teammates and earned him the MVP awards in both the NLCS and the World Series. Stargell capped off the year by hitting a dramatic home run in Baltimore during the late innings of a close Game 7 to seal a Pirates' championship. The home run was his third of the series and, coincidentally, credited Stargell with the winning runs in both Game 7s of the two postseason meetings between the Pirates and the Orioles (1971 and 1979). The 1979 World Series victory also made the Pirates the only franchise in baseball history to twice recover from a three-games-to-one deficit and win a World Series (previously they had done so in 1925 against the Washington Senators). For the series, Stargell went 12-for-30; along with his three home runs, he also recorded four doubles for 25 total bases, which remains tied as a World Series record, Reggie Jackson having set it in the 1977 World Series, and his seven extra-base hits (three HRs and four doubles) in the 1979 World Series also set a record.

In addition to his NLCS and World Series MVP awards, Stargell finally took home the elusive MVP award (as co-winner along with St. Louis' Keith Hernandez) at the age of 39. Stargell is the only player to have won all three MVP trophies in a single year. He was also named the Associated Press Athlete of the Year and The Sporting News Sportsman of the Year. He shared the Sports Illustrated magazine's "Sportsmen of the Year" award with NFL quarterback Terry Bradshaw, who also played at Three Rivers Stadium, for the Pittsburgh Steelers. Pirates manager Chuck Tanner said of Stargell, "Having him on your ball club is like having a diamond ring on your finger." Teammate Al Oliver once said, "If he asked us to jump off the Fort Pitt Bridge, we would ask him what kind of dive he wanted. That's how much respect we have for the man."

=== 1980s ===
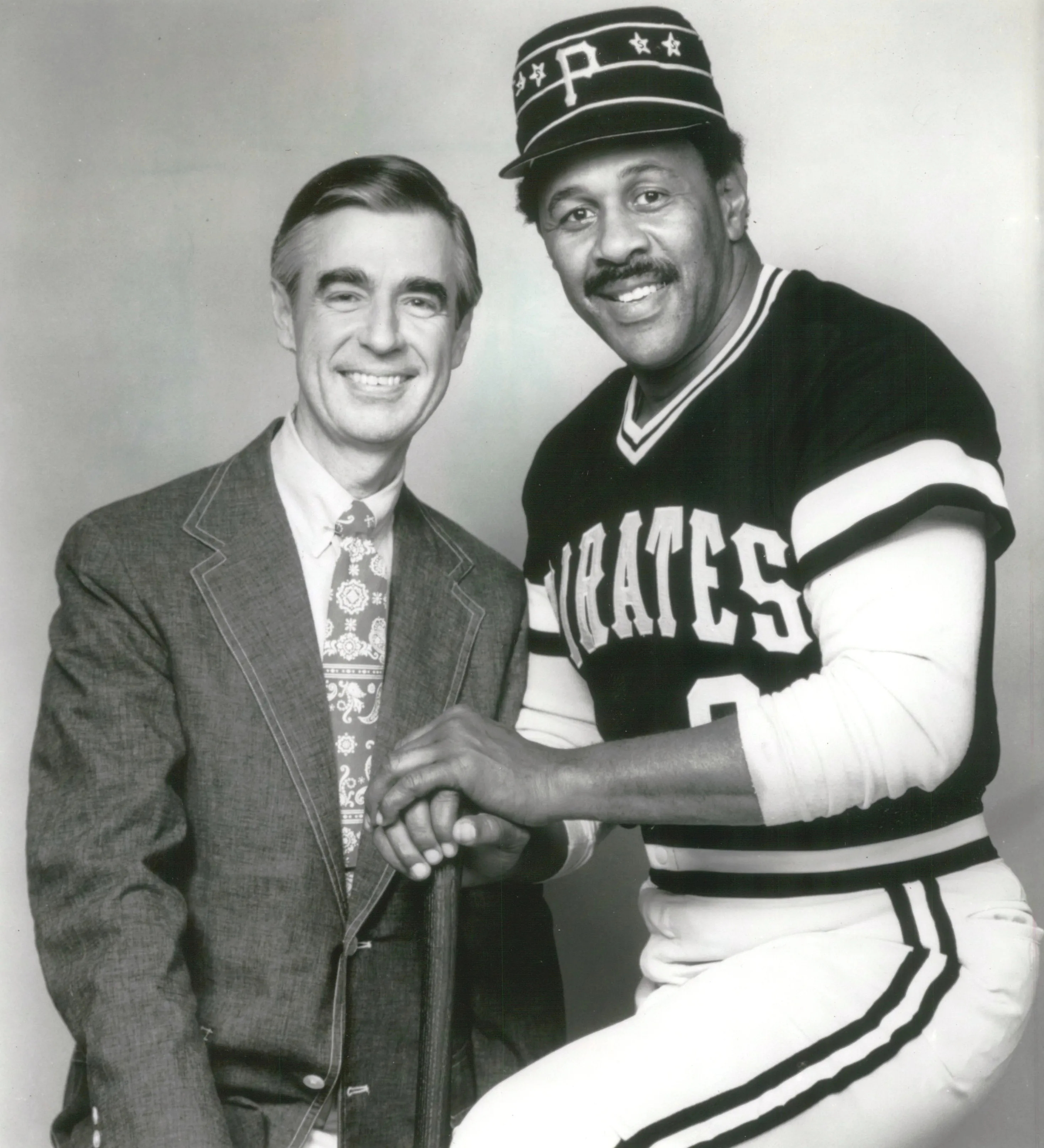
Stargell with Fred Rogers in 1980

Stargell played until 1982, but he never appeared in more than 74 games after 1979. He retired with 475 home runs despite playing much of his career at Forbes Field, whose center field distance was 457 feet (139 m). Hall of Famer Roberto Clemente estimated, perhaps generously, that Stargell hit 400 fly balls to the warning track in left and center fields during his eight seasons in the park. The short fence in right field (300 feet (91 m) to the foul pole) at Forbes Field was guarded by a screen more than 20 feet (6.1 m) high which ran from the right-field line to the 375-foot (114 m) mark in right center. Three Rivers Stadium, a neutral hitter's park, boosted Stargell's power numbers. The Pirates moved into Three Rivers in mid-1970, and he hit 310 of his 475 career home runs from 1970 until his retirement, despite turning 30 in 1970. Stargell's two home run titles came in his first three years at Three Rivers. Stargell's last game was on October 3, 1982, at Three Rivers Stadium against the Montreal Expos. Batting leadoff, he hit a single off Steve Rogers. He was then pinch run by Doug Frobel and subsequently was replaced by Richie Hebner at first base.

=== Long home runs ===
At one time, Stargell held the record for the longest home run in nearly half of the NL parks. On August 5, 1969, Stargell hit a home run off Alan Foster that left the stadium and measured 507 feet, the longest home run hit at Dodger Stadium. He hit a second home run out of Dodger Stadium on May 8, 1973, against Andy Messersmith, measured at 470 feet (140 m). Dodger Hall of Famer Don Sutton said of Stargell, "I never saw anything like it. He doesn't just hit pitchers, he takes away their dignity." Only six other home runs have been hit out of Dodger Stadium (2 in the 2025 postseason).

On June 25, 1971, Stargell hit the longest home run in Veterans Stadium history during a 14–4 Pirates win over the Philadelphia Phillies. The shot came in the second inning and chased starting pitcher Jim Bunning out of the game. The spot where the ball landed was eventually marked with a yellow star with a black "S" inside a white circle until Stargell's 2001 death, when the white circle was painted black. The star remained in place until the stadium's 2004 demolition. In 1978, against Wayne Twitchell of the Montreal Expos, Stargell hit the only fair ball to reach the club deck of Olympic Stadium. The seat where the ball landed (the home run was measured at 535 feet (163 m)) was replaced with a yellow seat, while the other seats in the upper deck are red. Upon the Expos departure in 2004, the seat was removed and sent to the Canadian Baseball Hall of Fame.

Bob Prince, the colorful longtime Pirate radio announcer, would greet a Stargell home run with the phrase "Chicken on the Hill". This referred to Stargell's ownership of a chicken restaurant in Pittsburgh's Hill District. For a time, whenever he homered, Stargell's restaurant would give away free chicken to all patrons present in the restaurant at the time of the home run, in a promotion dubbed "Chicken on the Hill with Will". Prince himself once promised free chicken to listeners if Stargell hit a home run; Stargell did homer and Prince picked up a $400 bill at the restaurant.

== Career statistics ==
Category	G	AB	R	H	2B	3B	HR	RBI	TB	BB	AVG	OBP	SLG	OPS	FLD%	Ref.
Total	2,360	7,927	1,194	2,232	423	55	475	1,540	4,190	937	.282	.360	.529	.889	.985	

In 36 postseason games, Stargell batted .278 (37-for-133) with 18 runs, 10 doubles, 7 home runs, 20 RBIs, 17 walks, on-base percentage of .359, slugging average of .511, and on-base plus slugging of .871.

== Later life ==
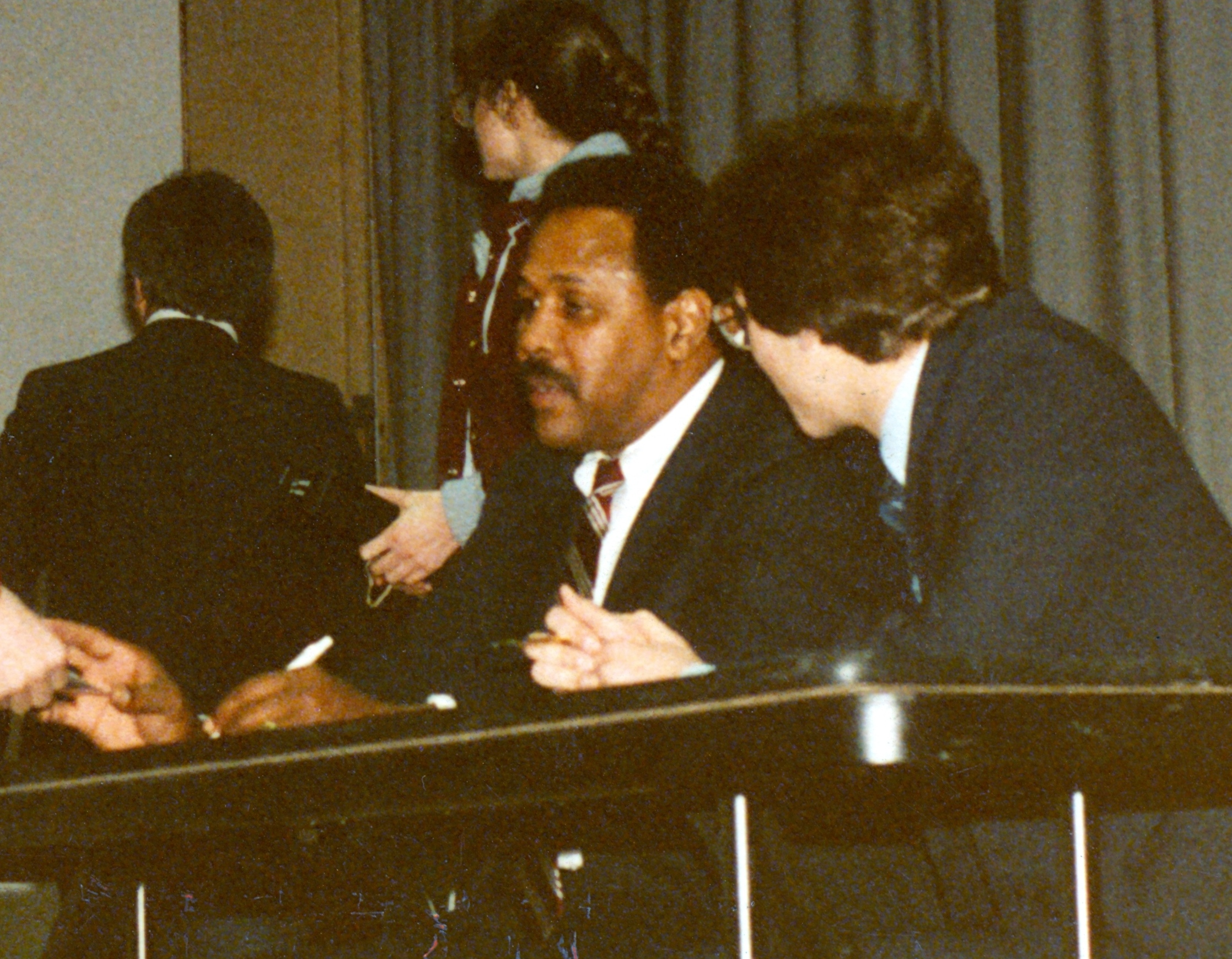
Stargell signs autographs after his retirement in 1983.

After retirement, Stargell spent two years as a first base coach for the Atlanta Braves from 1986 to 1988, wearing his customary #8. He was the first minor-league hitting coach for Chipper Jones. He was inducted into the Baseball Hall of Fame in 1988, his first year of eligibility. He had an awkward interaction with the Pirates that season when the team wanted to schedule a Willie Stargell Night to honor his Hall of Fame election. Stargell refused to participate in the team's plans, still stinging from the team's refusal to even consider him for its managerial job that season.

In the 1985 trial of alleged cocaine dealer Curtis Strong, Stargell was accused by Dale Berra and John Milner (both former Pirates teammates) of distributing "greenies" (amphetamines) to players. Berra said that he obtained amphetamines from Stargell and Bill Madlock; he said he could get them from Stargell "on any given day I asked him for one." Stargell strongly denied these accusations. Commissioner Peter Ueberroth later cleared Stargell and Madlock of any wrongdoing.

Stargell returned to the Pittsburgh club in 1997 as an aide to Cam Bonifay, the team's general manager. He also worked as a special baseball adviser to Pirates owner Kevin McClatchy, who called Stargell "the ultimate class act". Stargell was hospitalized for three weeks in 1999 to treat undisclosed medical problems with one of his organs. A source close to the Pirates blamed Stargell's health problems on his gaining weight after retiring as a player. Stargell lost some of that weight, but gained weight again while working for the Pittsburgh front office.

After years of suffering from a kidney disorder, he died of complications related to a stroke in Wilmington, North Carolina, on April 9, 2001. In his later life, Stargell had also suffered from hypertension and heart failure. A segment of Stargell's bowel was removed more than two years before he died. He had been in the hospital recovering from gallbladder surgery at the time of his death. On April 7, 2001, two days before Stargell died, a larger-than-life statue of him was unveiled at the Pirates' new stadium, PNC Park, as part of the opening-day ceremonies. As his death occurred on the same day as the official opening of the stadium against the Reds, the statue served as a de facto memorial for Stargell.

== Legacy ==
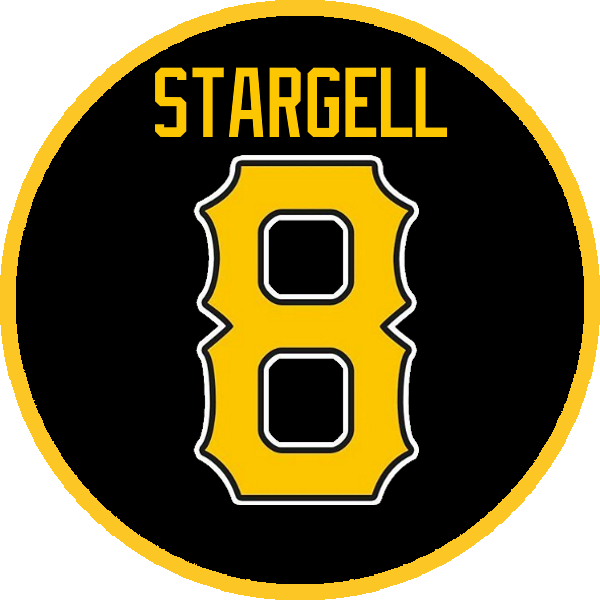
Willie Stargell's number 8 was retired by the Pittsburgh Pirates in 1982.

The Pirates retired his number 8 on September 6, 1982. In 1999, he ranked 81st on The Sporting News list of the 100 Greatest Baseball Players, and was also nominated as a finalist for the MLB All-Century Team. He threw out the ceremonial first pitch at the 1994 Major League Baseball All-Star Game. Stargell also threw out the ceremonial last pitch at Three Rivers Stadium before the team's move after the 2000 season.

After Stargell died, Joe Morgan said, "When I played, there were 600 baseball players, and 599 of them loved Willie Stargell. He's the only guy I could have said that about. He never made anybody look bad and he never said anything bad about anybody."

The Willie Stargell Foundation was established to promote research and treatment for kidney disease. Champion Enterprises sponsors a Willie Stargell Memorial Awards Banquet which raises money for disadvantaged children in Pittsburgh.

Stargell also worked to raise awareness of sickle cell anemia. He formed the Black Athletes Foundation (BAF) shortly after President Richard M. Nixon identified the disease as a "national health problem" in the early 1970s. For a decade, BAF, renamed the Willie Stargell Foundation, raised research money and public awareness about the disease. Starting in 1981, sickle cell awareness and fundraising was gradually being assumed by The Sickle Cell Society Inc. The Willie Stargell Foundation transitioned to raising money for treatment of and research into kidney disease.

Wilver “Willie” Stargell Avenue (formerly Tinker Avenue) is a major thoroughfare in his adolescent home of Alameda, California, connecting to the former Naval Air Station Alameda, and Stargell is honored with a plaque and plaza at its intersection with Fifth Street.

== See also ==
- Bay Area Sports Hall of Fame
- List of Major League Baseball career hits leaders
- List of Major League Baseball players to hit for the cycle
- List of Major League Baseball home run records
- List of Major League Baseball career home run leaders
- List of Major League Baseball career doubles leaders
- List of Major League Baseball career runs scored leaders
- List of Major League Baseball career runs batted in leaders
- List of Major League Baseball career total bases leaders
- List of Major League Baseball annual runs batted in leaders
- List of Major League Baseball annual home run leaders
- List of Major League Baseball annual doubles leaders
- List of Major League Baseball players who spent their entire career with one franchise

Awards and achievements
Preceded by Ken Boyer	Hitting for the cycle July 22, 1964	Succeeded by Jim Fregosi
Preceded by Joe Torre; Bob Gibson; Lou Brock	Major League Player of the Month; June 1965 (with Vern Law); April 1971; June 1971	Succeeded by Pete Rose; Lou Brock; Ferguson Jenkins
