= Indianapolis Clowns all-time roster =

The following is the list of players on the Indianapolis Clowns all-time roster. These are Indianapolis Clowns players who appeared in at least one game for the Clowns, while in either Indianapolis, Cincinnati or Buffalo from 1943 to 1965.

On-going research continuously discovers unreported or misreported games (and the affected players), while some games and players may be lost forever. Therefore, some Negro league players' affiliations will likely remain incomplete and possibly disputed.

‡ Bold player inducted as a member of the National Baseball Hall of Fame and Museum.

== A–D ==
Player	Year(s)	Position(s)	Ref
Hank Aaron‡	1952	SS	
Robert Abernathy	1947	OF	
Ben Adams	1953		
Hosea Allen	1947	P	
Newt Allen	1947	SS	
Lamb Barbee	1945	OF	
Bill Barnes	1947	P	
Pepper Bassett	1943–1944	C	
Jimmie Bennett	1945, 1948	P	
Bill Blair	1948–1950	P	
Randolph Bowe	1941	P	
Sherwood Brewer	1949–1950		
John Britton	1943, 1950	3B	
James Brown	1947	P	
T. J. Brown	1947	SS	
Willie Burns	1944	P	
Luis Cabrera	1948	P	
Rafael Cabrera	1944, 1948	OF	
Lefty Calhoun	1946	P	
Walter Cannady	1944	1B	
Paul Casanova	1960–1961		
Willie Cathey	1948	P	
Thad Christopher	1943	OF	
Duke Cleveland	1946–1947	OF	
Jim Cohen	1946–1952	P	
Alex Colthirst	1948	SS	
Jim Colzie	1946–1957	P	
Leroy Cromartie	1945	2B	
George Daniels	1943	P	
Peanuts Davis	1943, 1946	P	
Rosey Davis	1943–1945	P	
Reinaldo Drake	1945–1958	OF	
William Dumpson	1949		

== E–L ==
Player	Year(s)	Position(s)	Ref
Specs Ellis	1943	P	
Greene Farmer	1945	OF	
Benny Felder	1948	SS	
Coco Ferrer	1946–1948	SS	
Angel García	1945–1946, 1948	P	
Horace Garner	1948–1949, 1952	OF	
Alphonso Gerard	1947, 1949	OF	
Walter Lee Gibbons	1948–1949	P	
Hubert Glenn	1949		
Manuel Godínez	1946–1948	P	
Juan Guilbe	1947	P	
Sam Hairston	1945–1950	3B	
Perry Hall	1943	OF / P	
Chuck Harmon	1947	OF	
Dave Harper	1943–1944	OF	
Charlie Harris	1943	2B	
Buster Haywood	1943–1954	C	
Joe Henry	1955–1956	3B	
Preacher Henry	1943, 1946–1948	P	
Carrenza Howard	1947	P	
John Huber	1947	P	
Tice James	1936	3B	
Pee Wee Jenkins	1944–1945, 1952	P	
Mamie Johnson	1953–1955	P	
Thomas Johnson	1950	P	
Collins Jones	1943	SS	
Brennan King	1943	P	
Hal King	1962–1964		
Richard King	1943, 1945, 1948	1B	
Clarence Lamar	1943	2B	
Leonard Lindsay	1943, 1946–1947	1B	
Eddie Locke	1943	P	
Lester Lockett	1946	OF	

== M–R ==
Player	Year(s)	Position(s)	Ref
Al McCoy	1946	IF	
John Henry McQueen	1944		
Lázaro Medina	1944–1945	P	
Henry Merchant	1943–1948	OF	
Andrés Mesa	1948	OF	
Harry Millon	1947	SS	
Chester Moody	1956		
Connie Morgan	1954–1955	2B	
Leroy Morney	1943	SS	
Raúl Navarro	1945	OF	
Ray Neil	1942–1954		
Clyde Nelson	1943	OF	
Jimmy Newberry	1943	P	
Sam Odom	1946	P	
Albert Overton	1944	P	
Billy Parker	1961–1964		
Nat Peeples	1950–1951		
Charlie Peete	1950		
Luis Pérez	1948	3B	
Len Pigg	1947–1948	C	
Luis Pillot	1943	P	
Andrew Porter	1948–1950	P	
Jim Proctor	1955		
Tomás Quiñones	1947	P	
Alex Radcliff	1944–1945	3B	
Johnny Ray	1943–1945	OF	
Chico Renfroe	1949–1950		
Specs Roberts	1944	P	
Antonio Ruiz	1944	P	

== S–Z ==
Player	Year(s)	Position(s)	Ref
Sam Segraves	1943	OF	
Gene Smith	1946	SS	
George Smith	1956–1957	2B	
Henry Smith	1943–1945	SS	
Sylvester Snead	1943, 1946	IF / C / OF / P	
Toni Stone	1953	2B	
Ted Strong	1948	OF	
Goose Tatum	1943, 1945–1949	1B	
Fermín Valdés	1944	2B	
Armando Vázquez	1944–1946, 1952	1B	
Vicente Villafañe	1947	IF / OF	
Hoss Walker	1944–1947	SS	
Fay Washington	1945	P	
Amos Watson	1945–1946	P	
Willie Wells‡	1947	SS	
Jim West	1948	1B	
Ladd White	1948	P	
Jimmy Wilkes	1952	OF	
Jesse Williams	1948–1950	SS	
Johnny Williams	1944–1948	P	
Koney Williams	1948	SS	
Fred Wilson	1943, 1945	OF	
Chuck Wilson	1948	OF	
Les Witherspoon	1948	OF	
John Wyatt	1953, 1955–1956	P	
Leovigildo Xiqués	1944, 1946–1947	OF	
