= List of Major League Baseball players from Puerto Rico =

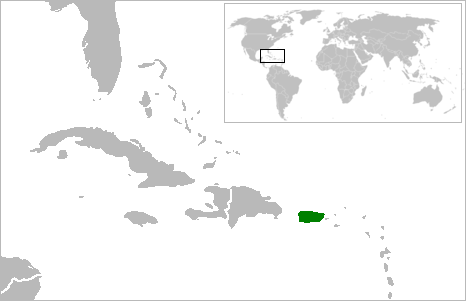
Location of Puerto Rico's main island (green)

Puerto Rico currently has the fourth-most active players in Major League Baseball (MLB) among Latin American jurisdictions, behind the Dominican Republic, Venezuela and Cuba. More than four hundred players from the archipelago have played in the major leagues since 1926. This includes players who were born in either one of the archipelago's islands and those of Puerto Rican heritage. Only those players who have worked in the major leagues are listed, not those active in the minor leagues, nor negro independent leagues.

For years, it was considered that the first player from Puerto Rico to play in the major leagues was Hiram Bithorn in 1942. But this changed in December 2020, when seven Negro baseball leagues between 1920 and 1948 were recognized as "major leagues." Thus, the first Puerto Rican to play baseball on the major leagues was Jose "Gacho" Torres, who debuted in 1926.

After the baseball color line was abandoned following Jackie Robinson's debut in the National League of MLB, more players from the island signed contracts. This led to an improvement in their performance, and some of them were selected to participate in the Major League Baseball All-Star Game. Including their names in the Major League Baseball draft is a requisite for first-year players born in Puerto Rico, because the league recognizes the island as a jurisdiction within the United States. Following the implementation of this measure, Puerto Rico's government requested exclusion from the draft and help to develop players, in order to reduce the impact of the change in the format of talent development.

== Historical performance and regulations ==
Baseball was introduced to Puerto Rico by immigrants during the nineteenth century. The first sanctioned baseball game in the island was played on January 9, 1898, in Santurce, Puerto Rico, where two teams composed of Puerto Rican, American and Cuban players participated. After this game, baseball became a widespread sport and professional and amateur leagues were organized. During this time period, the Puerto Rico national teams experienced success on international competition and Afro-Puerto Rican players began to participate in the Negro leagues.

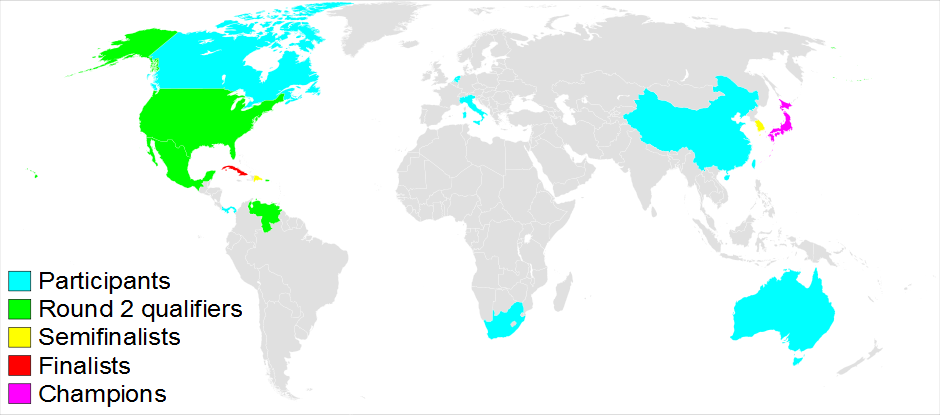
Map listing the countries that participated in the first edition of the World Baseball Classic

Hiram Bithorn debuted as a pitcher with the Chicago Cubs on April 15, 1942, but before him, there were about 10 other players who worked on the negro leagues, now considered as major leagues. About 17 other Puerto Rican players in the negro leagues were active right before the introduction of African American players in Major League Baseball, and thus, there were more chances to players born in the island. Subsequently, Afro-Puerto Rican players such as Orlando Cepeda and Victor Pellot Power began having solid performances in the league, and were selected to participate in the Major League Baseball All-Star Game. In 1973, Roberto Clemente became the first player from Puerto Rico and first Latin American to be elected as a member of the National Baseball Hall of Fame and Museum. Since then Puerto Rico has kept a stable number of players in the league. During this timeframe, several players have been selected to participate in the All-Star Game or won awards for their performance, while others imposed records within the league. These include Javy López, who holds the record for most home runs hit by a catcher in a single season. Both Iván Rodríguez and Roberto Alomar hold the record for most Gold Glove Awards in their positions. Recipients of the Most Valuable Player Award include Orlando Cepeda, Juan González and Iván Rodríguez. Roberto Clemente and Mike Lowell also won the World Series MVP Award in their respective divisions. Carlos Delgado is the only Latin to hit 4 homers in a game.

Originally, players who were either born or naturalized in Puerto Rico were able to sign with MLB teams as free agents, usually receiving minor-league contracts prior to their debut in the league. In 1989, Major League Baseball decided to include the island in the list of jurisdictions within the United States, which made mandatory that first-year players include their name in the Major League Baseball Draft in order to receive a contract. This was based on an initiative that was supposed to create a national and international drafting system. The change reduced the number of players that were able to participate in the league, by limiting the number of them selected by the teams; this led to the island's Secretary of Recreation and Sports, to formally ask to Major League's involvement in developing specialized schools to produce more players and other measures to reduce the impact of the draft's implementation. The original proposal included Puerto Rico's exclusion of the draft for a period of ten years, but this was not approved by the league.

Puerto Rico was one of sixteen teams to participate in the inaugural edition of the World Baseball Classic. The tournament was created by Major League Baseball, the Major League Baseball Players Association, and other professional baseball leagues and their players associations around the world, including the Puerto Rican Professional Baseball League. The first event was organized in 2006, and was sanctioned by the International Baseball Federation. Puerto Rico won the silver medal on both 2013 and 2017 classics. The Hiram Bithorn Stadium in San Juan, Puerto Rico hosted 22 Montreal Expos home games in 2003, after the league decided to relocate the team to San Juan as part of an experiment to "globalize" baseball. During the series there was an average attendance of 14,222.

== List of players ==
This list includes players born in Puerto Rico and players born outside of Puerto Rico to a Puerto Rican parent.

=== A–E ===
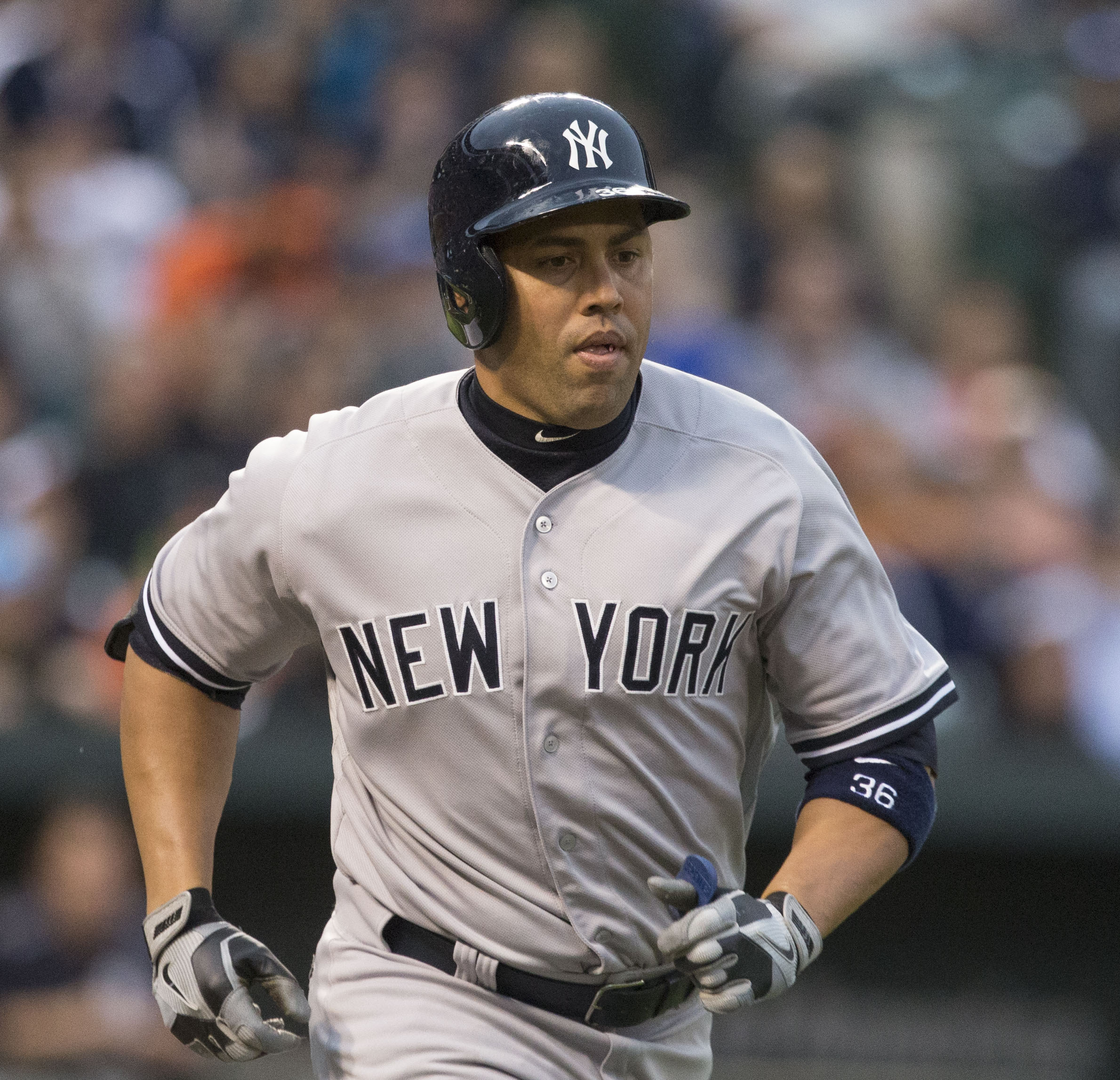
Carlos Beltrán

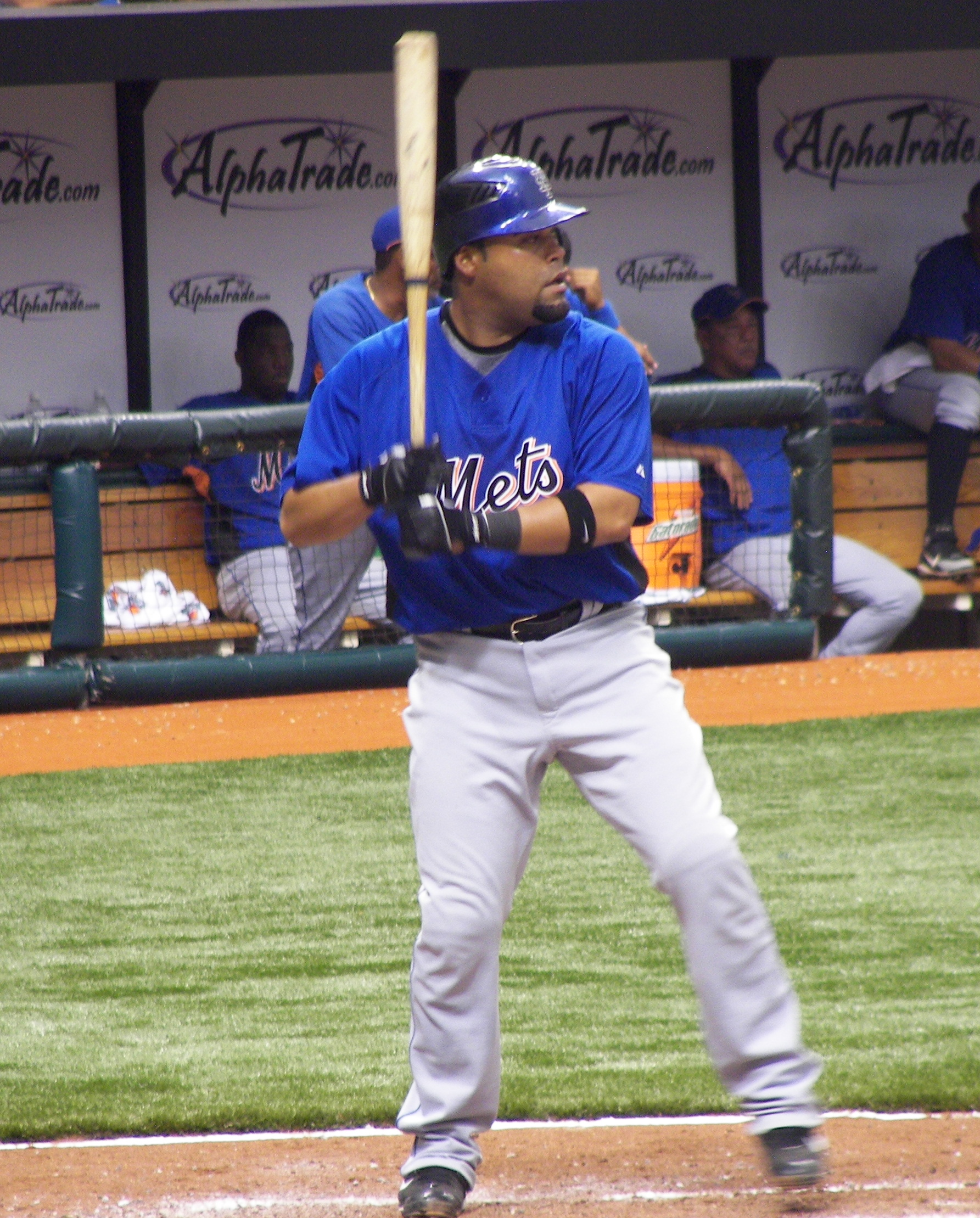
Ramón Castro

Name	Debut team	Years active	Reference
Juan Agosto	Chicago White Sox	1981–1993	
Luis Aguayo	Philadelphia Phillies	1980–1989	
Jonathan Albaladejo	Washington Nationals	2007–2012	
José Alberro	Texas Rangers	1995–1997	
Luis Alcaraz	Los Angeles Dodgers	1967–1970	
Luis Alicea	St. Louis Cardinals	1988–2002	
Roberto Alomar	San Diego Padres	1988–2004	
Sandy Alomar Jr.	San Diego Padres	1988–2007	
Sandy Alomar Sr.	Milwaukee Braves	1964–1978	
Luis Alvarado	Boston Red Sox	1968–1977	
Orlando Álvarez	Los Angeles Dodgers	1973–1976	
Robert Andino	Florida Marlins	2005–2013	
Luis Aquino	Toronto Blue Jays	1986–1995	
Jake Arrieta	Baltimore Orioles	2010–2022	
Christian Arroyo	San Francisco Giants	2017–2023	
Edwin Arroyo	Cincinnati Reds	2026	
Luis Arroyo	St. Louis Cardinals	1955–1963	
Rudy Arroyo	St.Louis Cardinals	1971	
Luis Atilano	Washington Nationals	2010	
Mike Avilés	Kansas City Royals	2011–2017	
Ramón Avilés	Boston Red Sox	1977–1981	
Benny Ayala	New York Mets	1974–1985	
Carlos Baerga	Cleveland Indians	1990–2005	
Javier Báez	Chicago Cubs	2014–present	
Kevin Baez	New York Mets	1990–1993	
Aaron Bates	Boston Red Sox	2009	
Carlos Beltrán	Kansas City Royals	1998–2017	
Juan Beníquez	Boston Red Sox	1971–1987	
Yamil Benítez	Montreal Expos	1995–1998	
Jonathan Bermúdez	Miami Marlins	2024	
Tony Bernazard	Montreal Expos	1979–1991	
Carlos Bernier	Pittsburgh Pirates	1953	
José Berríos	Minnesota Twins	2016–present	
Hiram Bithorn	Chicago Cubs	1942–1947	
Hiram Bocachica	Los Angeles Dodgers	2000–2007	
Ricky Bones	San Diego Padres	1991–2001	
Bobby Bonilla	Chicago White Sox	1986–2001	
Juan Bonilla	San Diego Padres	1981–1987	
Hiram Burgos	Milwaukee Brewers	2013	
Raymond Burgos	San Francisco Giants	2024	
Fernando Cabrera	Cleveland Indians	2004–2010	
Luis Cabrera	Indianapolis Clowns	1948	
Jac Caglianone	Kansas City Royals	2025	
Ivan Calderón	Seattle Mariners	1984–1993	
Kiko Calero	St. Louis Cardinals	2003–2009	
Luis Campusano	San Diego Padres	2020–2021	
Robinson Cancel	Milwaukee Brewers	1999–2011	
John Candelaria	Pittsburgh Pirates	1975–1993	
John Cangelosi	Chicago White Sox	1985–1999	
Víctor Caratini	Chicago Cubs	2017–present	
Javier Cardona	Detroit Tigers	2000–2002	
Rafael Carmona	Seattle Mariners	1995–1999	
Raúl Casanova	Detroit Tigers	1996–2009	
Ramón Castro	Florida Marlins	1999–2011	
Willi Castro	Detroit Tigers	2019–present	
Xavier Cedeño	Washington Nationals	2011–2019	
Juan Centeno	New York Mets	2013–2019	
Orlando Cepeda	San Francisco Giants	1958–1974	
Leonardo Chapman	Baltimore Elite Giants	1944	
Alex Cintrón	Arizona Diamondbacks	2001–2010	
Alex Claudio	Texas Rangers	2014–2021	
Edgard Clemente	Colorado Rockies	1998–2000	
Roberto Clemente	Pittsburgh Pirates	1955–1972	
Jaime Cocanower	Milwaukee Brewers	1983–1986	
Pancho Coimbre	New York Cubans	1940–1944	
Willie Collazo	New York Mets	2007	
Christian Colón	Kansas City Royals	2014–2020	
Joe Colón	Cleveland Indians	2016	
Monchile Concepción	Phila. Bacharach Giants	1934	
Onix Concepción	Kansas City Royals	1980–1987	
Ramón Conde	Chicago White Sox	1962	
Alex Cora	Los Angeles Dodgers	1998–2011	
Joey Cora	San Diego Padres	1987–1998	
Wil Cordero	Montreal Expos	1992–2005	
Carlos Corporán	Houston Astros	2009–2015	
Carlos Correa	Houston Astros	2015–present	
Edwin Correa	Chicago White Sox	1985–1987	
Carlos Cortes	Oakland Athletics	2025	
Fernando Cortez	Tampa Bay Devil Rays	2005–2007	
Henry Cotto	Chicago Cubs	1984–1993	
César Crespo	San Diego Padres	2001–2004	
Felipe Crespo	Toronto Blue Jays	1996–2001	
Fernando Cruz	Cincinnati Reds	2022-present	
Héctor Cruz	St. Louis Cardinals	1973–1982	
Henry Cruz	Los Angeles Dodgers	1975–1978	
Julio Cruz	Seattle Mariners	1977–1986	
Iván Cruz	New York Yankees	1997–2002	
José Cruz	St. Louis Cardinals	1970–1988	
José Cruz Jr.	Seattle Mariners	1997–2008	
Cirilo "Tommy" Cruz	St. Louis Cardinals	1973–1977	
Trei Cruz	Detroit Tigers	2026	
Noel Cuevas	Colorado Rockies	2018–2019	
David DeJesus	Kansas City Royals	2003–2015	
José DeJesús	Kansas City Royals	1988–1994	
Iván DeJesús	Los Angeles Dodgers	1974–1988	
Iván DeJesús Jr.	Los Angeles Dodgers	2011–2016	
José De La Torre	Boston Red Sox	2013	
Adrian Del Castillo	Arizona Diamondbacks	2024-present	
José De León	Los Angeles Dodgers	2016–2021	
Luis DeLeón	St. Louis Cardinals	1981–1989	
Carlos Delgado	Toronto Blue Jays	1993–2009	
Felle Delgado	New York Cubans	1941	
Puchy Delgado	Seattle Mariners	1977	
Joe DeSa	St. Louis Cardinals	1980	
Alex Díaz	Milwaukee Brewers	1992–1999	
Alexis Díaz	Cincinnati Reds	2022-present	
Carlos Diaz	Atlanta Braves	1982–1986	
Edgar Díaz	Milwaukee Brewers	1986–1990	
Edwin Díaz	Arizona Diamondbacks	1998–1999	
Edwin Díaz	New York Mets	2016–present	
Isan Díaz	Miami Marlins	2019–2020	
Jonathan Diaz	Boston Red Sox	2013–2015	
Mario Díaz	Seattle Mariners	1987–1995	
Mike Díaz	Chicago Cubs	1983–1988	
Angel Echevarría	Colorado Rockies	1996–2002	
Christian Encarnacion-Strand	Cincinnati Reds	2023-present	
Nino Escalera	Cincinnati Redlegs	1954	
José Espada	San Diego Padres	2023, 2025	

=== F–L ===
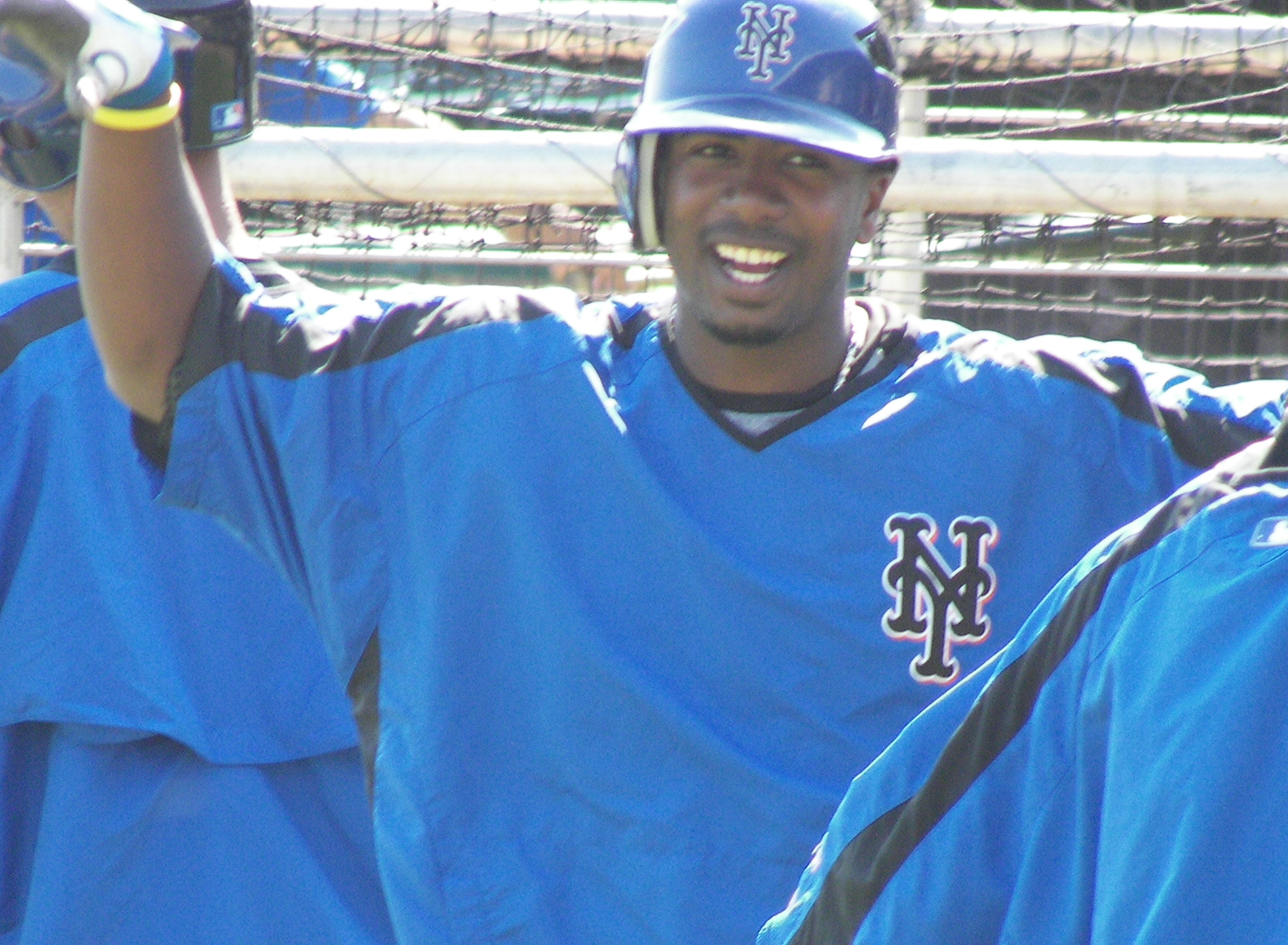
Rubén Gotay

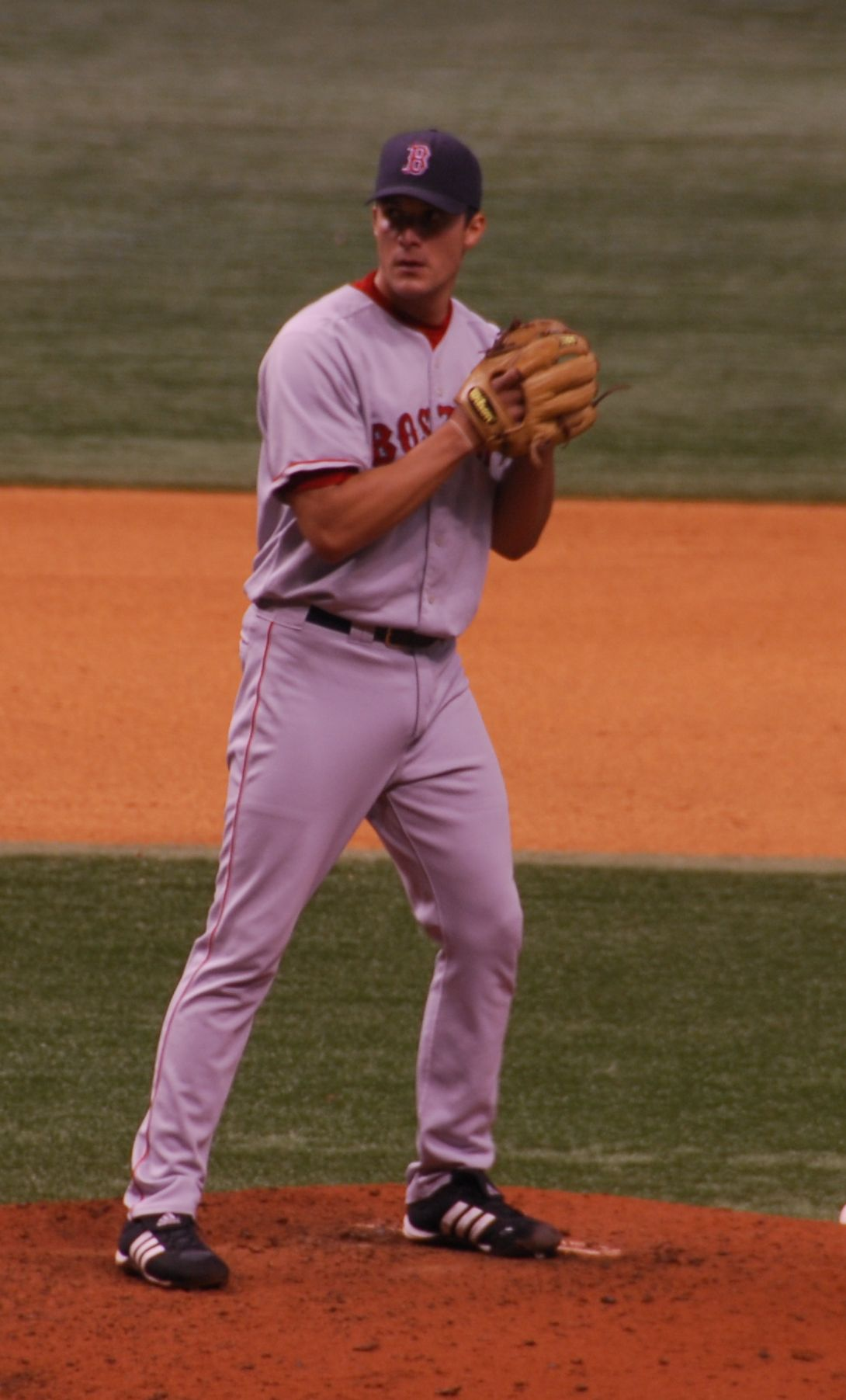
Javier López

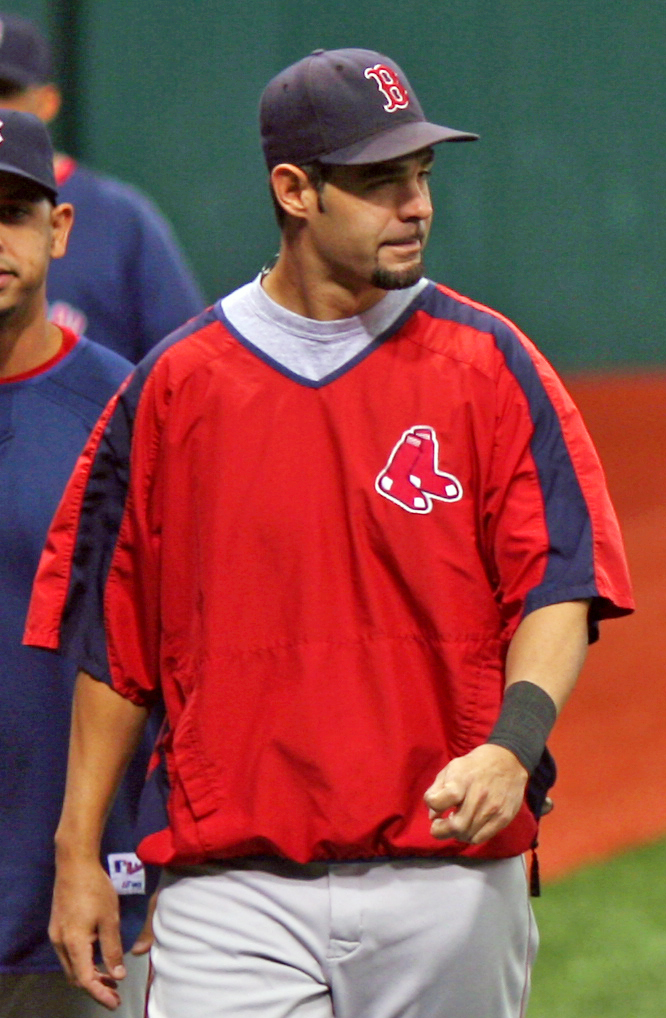
Mike Lowell

Name	Debut team	Years active	Reference
Irving Falú	Kansas City Royals	2012–2014	
Johneshwy Fargas	New York Mets	2021	
Jesús Feliciano	New York Mets	2010	
Mario Feliciano	Milwaukee Brewers	2021-2022	
Pedro Feliciano	New York Mets	2002–2013	
Coco Ferrer	Indianapolis Clowns	1946–1948	
Sergio Ferrer	Minnesota Twins	1974–1979	
Ed Figueroa	California Angels	1974–1981	
Luis Figueroa	Pittsburgh Pirates	2001–2007	
Nelson Figueroa	Arizona Diamondbacks	2000–2011	
Tite Figueroa	Baltimore Elite Giants	1946	
Tito Figueroa	New York Cubans	1940	
Braydon Fisher	Toronto Blue Jays	2025-present	
Gil Flores	California Angels	1977–1979	
Jose Flores	Oakland Athletics	2002–2004	
Miguel Fuentes	Seattle Pilots	1969	
Rey Fuentes	San Diego Padres	2013–2017	
Brandyn Garcia	Seattle Mariners	2025	
Jason Garcia	Baltimore Orioles	2015	
Pedro García	Milwaukee Brewers	1973–1977	
Rico Garcia	Colorado Rockies	2019–2020	
Mychal Givens	Baltimore Orioles	2015–2023	
Leo Gómez	Baltimore Orioles	1990–1996	
Rubén Gómez	New York Giants	1953–1962	
Andy González	Chicago White Sox	2007–2009	
Dicky Gonzalez	New York Mets	2001–2004	
Fernando González	Pittsburgh Pirates	1972–1979	
Juan González	Texas Rangers	1989–2005	
Julio González	Houston Astros	1977–1983	
Pedro González	New York Yankees	1963–1967	
Raúl González	Chicago Cubs	2000–2004	
Julio Gotay	St. Luis Cardinals	1960–1969	
Rubén Gotay	Kansas City Royals	2004–2008	
Vaughn Grissom	Atlanta Braves	2022-2024	
Felix Guilbe	Baltimore Elite Giants	1946–1947	
Juan Guilbe	New York Cubans	1940–1947	
Edwards Guzmán	San Francisco Giants	1999–2003	
José Guzmán	Texas Rangers	1985–1994	
Dom Hamel	New York Mets	2025	
Von Hayes	Cleveland Indians	1981–1992	
Darell Hernáiz	Oakland Athletics	2024-present	
Jesús Hernáiz	Philadelphia Phillies	1974	
Alex Hernández	Pittsburgh Pirates	2000–2001	
Enrique Hernández	Miami Marlins	2014–present	
José Hernández	Texas Rangers	1991–2006	
Ramón Hernández	Atlanta Braves	1967–1977	
Roberto Hernández	Chicago White Sox	1991–2007	
Rudy Hernández	Washington Senators	1960–1961	
Willie Hernández	Chicago Cubs	1977–1989	
Orlando Isales	Philadelphia Phillies	1980	
Josh James	Houston Astros	2018–2021	
Mike James	California Angels	1995–2002	
A. J. Jiménez	Texas Rangers	2017	
Joe Jiménez	Atlanta Braves	2017–2024	
Ricardo Jordan	Toronto Blue Jays	1995–1998	
Marc Kroon	San Diego Padres	1995–2004	
Coco Laboy	Montreal Expos	1969–1973	
Alex Lange	Detroit Tigers	2021–present	
Ricky Ledée	New York Yankees	1998–2007	
José León	Baltimore Orioles	2002–2004	
Carlos Lezcano	Chicago Cubs	1980–1981	
Sixto Lezcano	Milwaukee Brewers	1974–1985	
Frankie Librán	San Diego Padres	1969	
José Lind	Pittsburgh Pirates	1987–1995	
Francisco Lindor	New York Mets	2015–present	
Art López	New York Yankees	1965	
Felipe López	Toronto Blue Jays	2001–2011	
Jack López	Boston Red Sox	2021, 2024	
Javier López	Colorado Rockies	2003–2016	
Javy López	Atlanta Braves	1992–2006	
Jorge López	Milwaukee Brewers	2015–present	
Luis Lopez	Los Angeles Dodgers	1990–1991	
Luis López	San Diego Padres	1993–2005	
Luis Lopez	Toronto Blue Jays	2001–2004	
Raffy Lopez	Chicago Cubs	2014–2018	
Mike Lowell	Boston Red Sox	1998–2010	
Willie Lozado	Milwaukee Brewers	1984	
Matthew Lugo	Los Angeles Angels	2025	
Seth Lugo	New York Mets	2016–present	

=== M–Q ===
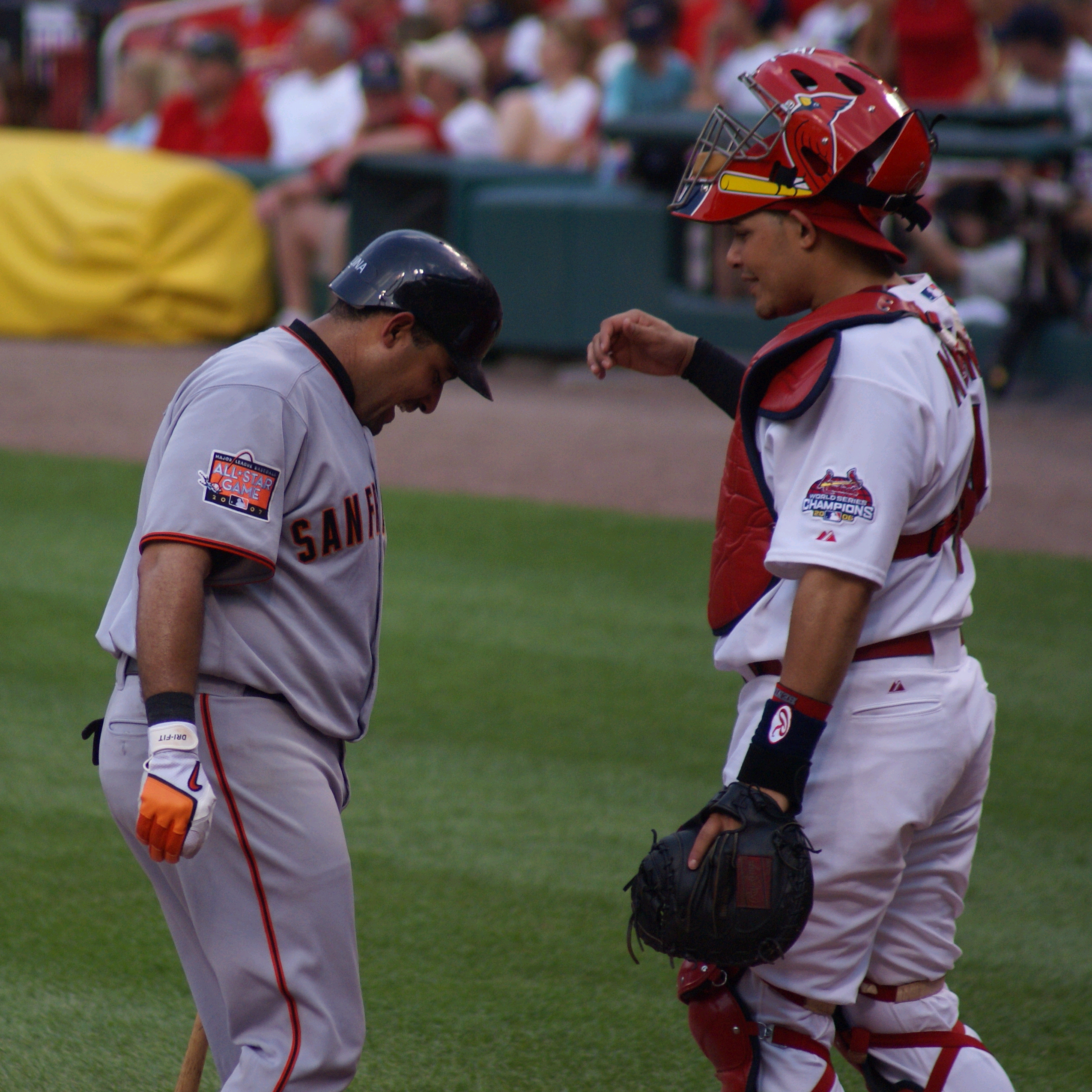
Bengie and Yadier Molina

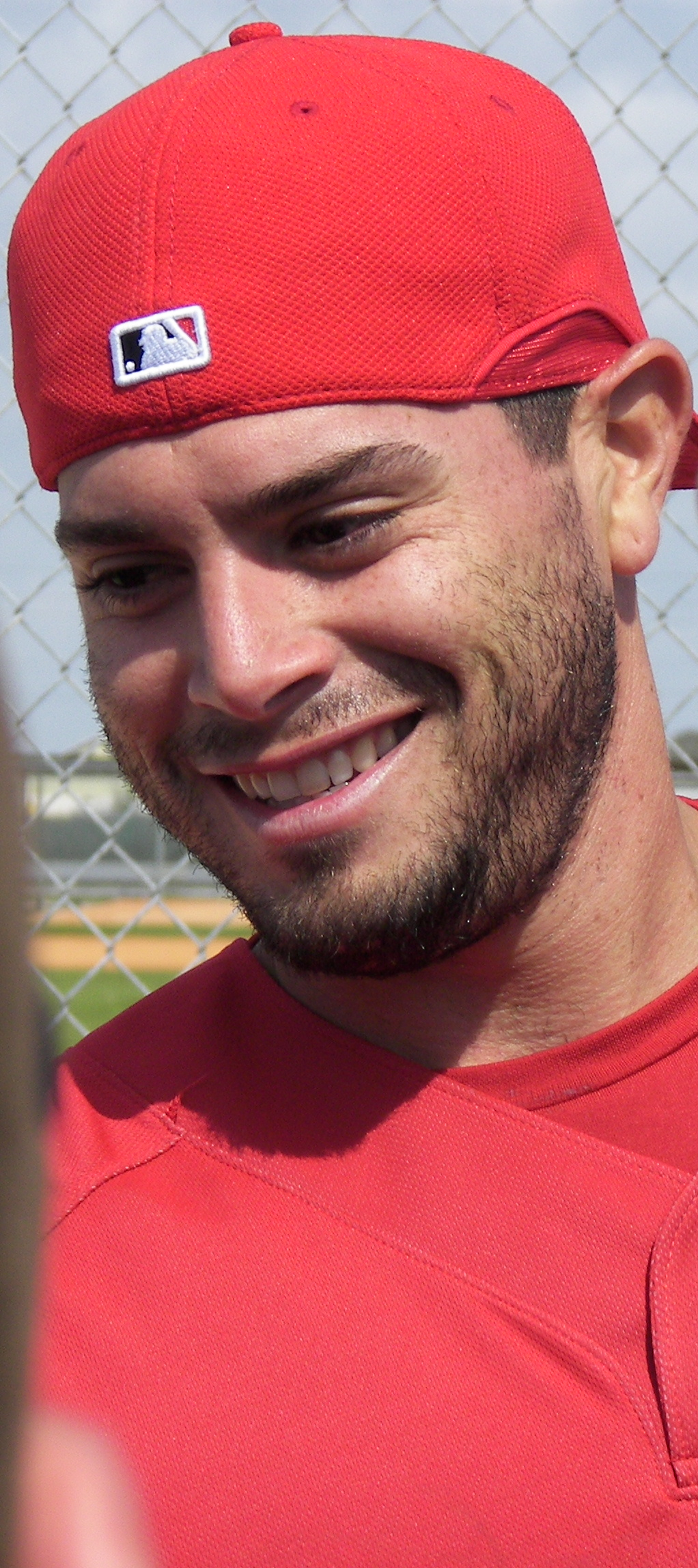
Joel Piñeiro

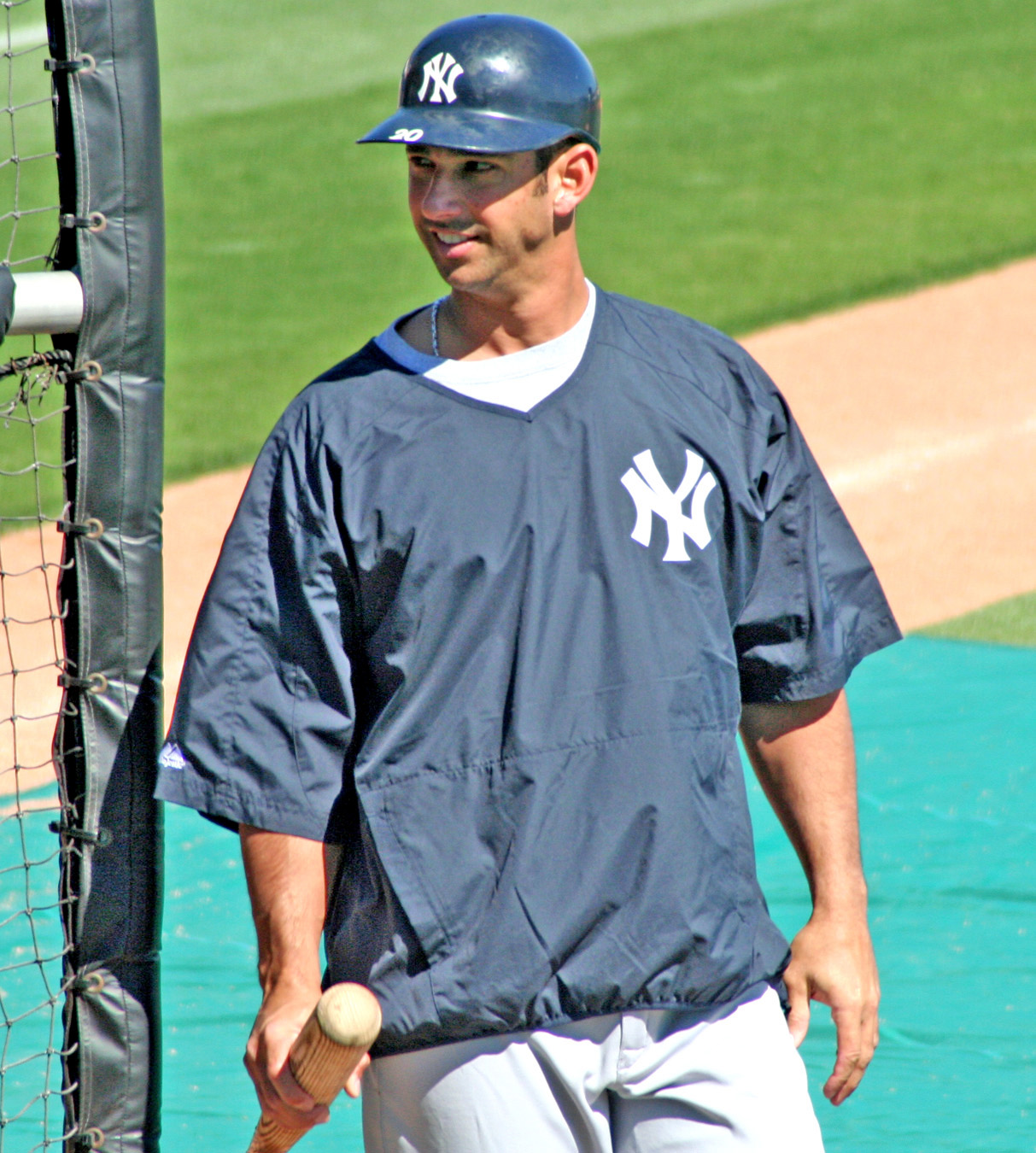
Jorge Posada

Name	Debut team	Years active	Reference
Vimael Machin	Oakland Athletics	2020–2021	
Anthony Maldonado	Miami Marlins	2024	
Candy Maldonado	Los Angeles Dodgers	1981–1995	
Martín Maldonado	Milwaukee Brewers	2011–present	
Ángel Mangual	Pittsburgh Pirates	1969–1976	
Pepe Mangual	Montreal Expos	1972–1977	
Félix Mantilla Lamela	Milwaukee Braves	1956–1966	
Robert Manuel	Cincinnati Reds	2009–2010	
Luis Márquez	Homestead Grays	1946–1954	
Oreste Marrero	Montreal Expos	1993–1996	
Austin Martin	Minnesota Twins	2024-present	
Carmelo Martínez	Chicago Cubs	1983–1991	
Dave Martínez	Chicago Cubs	1986–2001	
Edgar Martínez	Seattle Mariners	1987–2004	
Javier Martínez	Pittsburgh Pirates	1998	
Ozzie Martínez	Florida Marlins	2010–2011	
Ramón Martínez	San Francisco Giants	1998–2009	
Damon Mashore	Oakland Athletics	1996–1998	
John Matias	Chicago White Sox	1970	
Julius Matos	San Diego Padres	2002–2003	
Luis Matos	Baltimore Orioles	2000–2006	
Edwin Maysonet	Houston Astros	2008–2012	
Francisco Meléndez	Philadelphia Phillies	1984–1989	
José Meléndez	Seattle Mariners	1990–1994	
Luis Meléndez	St. Louis Cardinals	1970–1977	
MJ Melendez	Kansas City Royals	2022–present	
Héctor Mercado	Cincinnati Reds	2000–2003	
Orlando Mercado	Seattle Mariners	1982–1990	
Orlando Merced	Pittsburgh Pirates	1990–2003	
Félix Millán	Atlanta Braves	1966–1977	
Ángel Miranda	Milwaukee Brewers	1993–1997	
José Miranda	Minnesota Twins	2022–present	
Bengie Molina	Anaheim Angels	1998–2010	
José Molina	Chicago Cubs	1999–2014	
Yadier Molina	St. Louis Cardinals	2004–2022	
Johnny Monell	San Francisco Giants	2013–2015	
Rafael Montalvo	Houston Astros	1986	
Lou Montañez	Baltimore Orioles	2008–2011	
Willie Montañez	California Angels	1966–1982	
Charlie Montoyo	Montreal Expos	1993	
Dan Monzon	Minnesota Twins	1972–1973	
Jerry Morales	San Diego Padres	1969–1983	
José Morales	Minnesota Twins	2007–2011	
José Morales	Oakland Athletics	1973–1984	
Jovani Moran	Minnesota Twins	2021-present	
Roger Moret	Boston Red Sox	1970–1978	
Steven Moya	Detroit Tigers	2014–2016	
Manny Muñiz	Philadelphia Phillies	1971	
Jose Munoz	Chicago White Sox	1996	
Bobby Muñoz	New York Yankees	1993–2001	
Pedro Muñoz	Minnesota Twins	1990–1996	
Bob Natal	Montreal Expos	1992–1997	
Brian Navarreto	Miami Marlins	2020, 2025	
Jaime Navarro	Milwaukee Brewers	1989–2000	
Julio Navarro	Los Angeles Angels	1962–1970	
Millito Navarro	Cuban Stars East	1928–1929	
Rey Navarro	Baltimore Orioles	2015	
Tito Navarro	New York Mets	1993	
Kristopher Negrón	Cincinnati Reds	2012–2019	
Tomás Nido	New York Mets	2017–present	
Juan Nieves	Milwaukee Brewers	1986–1988	
Melvin Nieves	Atlanta Braves	1992–1998	
Wil Nieves	San Diego Padres	2002–2015	
Rafael Novoa	San Francisco Giants	1990–1993	
Edwin Núñez	Seattle Mariners	1982–1994	
Ed Olivares	St. Louis Cardinals	1960–1961	
Omar Olivares	St. Louis Cardinals	1990–2001	
Francisco Oliveras	Minnesota Twins	1989–1992	
Luis Rodríguez Olmo	Brooklyn Dodgers	1943–1951	
José Oquendo	New York Mets	1983–1995	
Abimelec Ortiz	Washington Nationals	2026	
Danny Ortiz	Pittsburgh Pirates	2017	
Héctor Ortiz	Kansas City Royals	1998–2002	
José Ortiz	Chicago White Sox	1969–1971	
Junior Ortíz	Pittsburgh Pirates	1982–1994	
Rafaelito Ortiz	Chicago American Giants	1948	
Ricky Otero	New York Mets	1995–1997	
Jorge Padilla	Washington Nationals	2009	
Juan Padilla	New York Yankees	2004–2005	
Nicholas Padilla	Chicago Cubs	2022	
Ángel Pagán	Chicago Cubs	2006–2016	
Emilio Pagán	San Diego Padres	2017–present	
José Pagán	San Francisco Giants	1959–1973	
Josh Palacios	Toronto Blue Jays	2021-2025	
Rey Palacios	Kansas City Royals	1988–1990	
Richie Palacios	Cleveland Guardians	2022-present	
Sam Parrilla	Philadelphia Phillies	1970	
Victor Pellot	Philadelphia Athletics	1954–1965	
Bert Peña	Houston Astros	1981–1987	
Jim Pena	San Francisco Giants	1992	
Luis Peraza	Philadelphia Phillies	1969	
Jose Pereira	Baltimore Elite Giants	1947	
Eduardo Perez	California Angels	1993–2006	
Luis Pérez	Indianapolis Clowns	1948	
Michael Pérez	Tampa Bay Rays	2018–2023	
Mike Pérez	St. Louis Cardinals	1990–1997	
Roberto Pérez	Cleveland Indians	2014–2023	
Luis Pillot	New York Black Yankees	1941–43	
Joel Piñeiro	Seattle Mariners	2000–2011	
Juan Pizarro	Milwaukee Braves	1957–1974	
Rafael Polanco	Newark Eagles	1941	
Carlos Ponce	Milwaukee Brewers	1985	
Simon Pond	Toronto Blue Jays	2004	
Arnie Portocarrero	Philadelphia Athletics	1954–1960	
Jorge Posada	New York Yankees	1995–2011	
Luis Quiñones	Oakland Athletics	1983–1992	
Rey Quiñones	Boston Red Sox	1986–1989	
Tomás Quiñones	Indianapolis Clowns	1947	
Luis Quintana	California Angels	1974–1975	

=== R–W ===
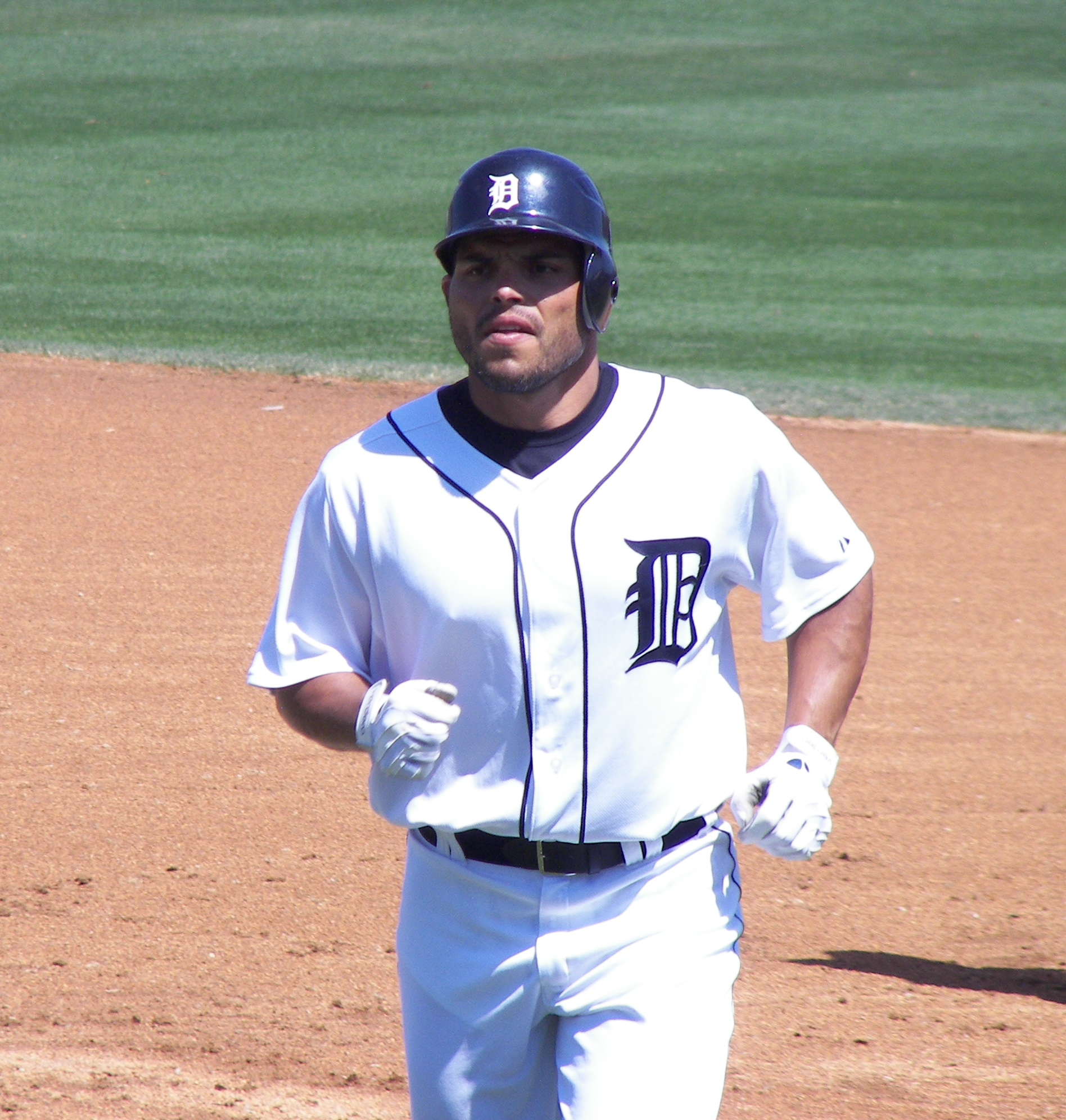
Iván Rodríguez

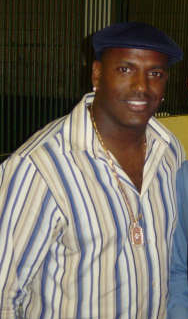
Rubén Sierra

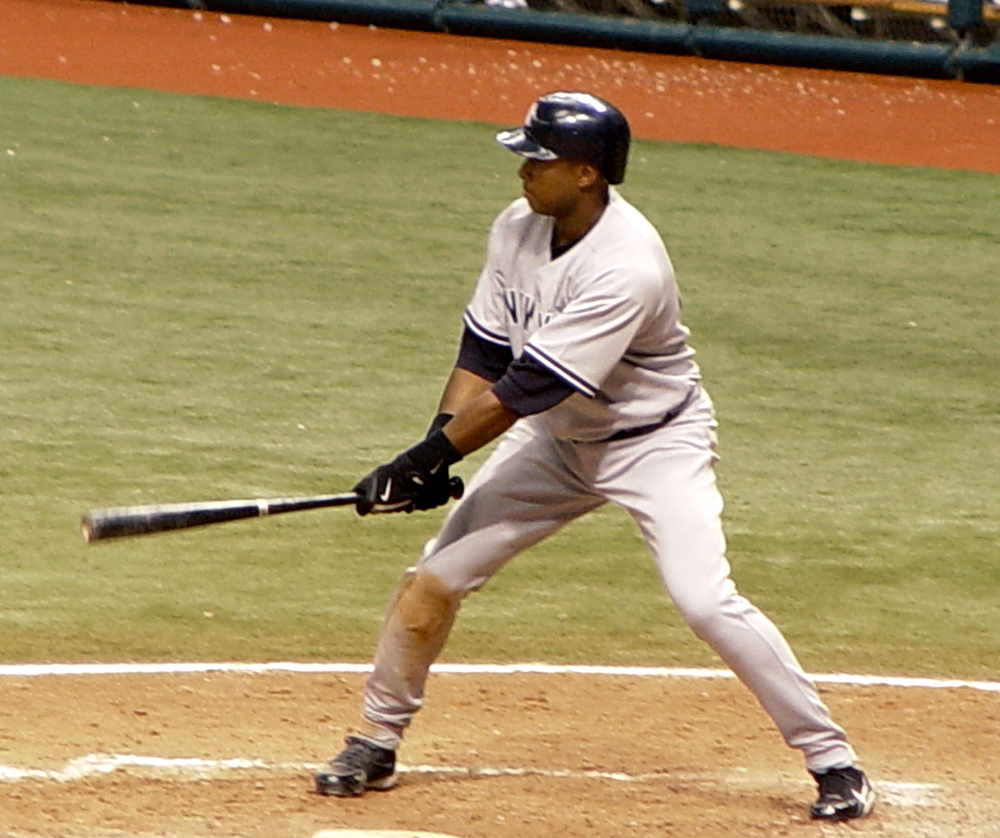
Bernie Williams

Name	Debut team	Years active	Reference
Mario Ramírez	New York Mets	1980–1985	
Milt Ramírez	St. Louis Cardinals	1970–1979	
Heliot Ramos	San Francisco Giants	2022-present	
Henry Ramos	Arizona Diamondbacks	2021, 2023	
Vidal Richardson	Cleveland Buckeyes	1946	
Alex Ríos	Toronto Blue Jays	2004–2015	
Armando Ríos	San Francisco Giants	1998–2003	
Edwin Ríos	Los Angeles Dodgers	2019–2021	
Juan Ríos	Kansas City Royals	1969	
Yacksel Ríos	Philadelphia Phillies	2017–2021	
Bombo Rivera	Montreal Expos	1975–1982	
Carlos Rivera	Pittsburgh Pirates	2003–2004	
Charlie Rivera	Baltimore Elite Giants	1939–1944	
Eduardo Rivera	Boston Red Sox	2026	
Emmanuel Rivera	Kansas City Royals	2021–present	
Germán Rivera	Los Angeles Dodgers	1983–1985	
Jim Rivera	St. Louis Browns	1952–1961	
Luis Rivera	Montreal Expos	1986–1998	
Mike Rivera	Detroit Tigers	2001–2011	
René Rivera	Seattle Mariners	2004–2021	
Roberto Rivera	Chicago Cubs	1995–1999	
Saúl Rivera	Washington Nationals	2006–2010	
T.J. Rivera	New York Mets	2016–2017	
Yadiel Rivera	Milwaukee Brewers	2015–2020	
Benny Rodríguez	Chicago American Giants	1948	
Dereck Rodríguez	San Francisco Giants	2018–2023	
Eduardo Rodríguez	Milwaukee Brewers	1973–1979	
Edwin Rodríguez	New York Yankees	1982–1985	
Ellie Rodríguez	New York Yankees	1968–1976	
Elmer Rodríguez	New York Yankees	2026	
Frank Rodríguez	Boston Red Sox	1995–2001	
Iván Rodríguez	Texas Rangers	1991–2010	
John Rodríguez	St. Louis Cardinals	2005–2006	
Johnathan Rodriguez	Cleveland Guardians	2024	
José Rodríguez	St. Louis Cardinals	2000–2002	
Steve Rodriguez	Boston Red Sox	1995	
Tony Rodríguez	Boston Red Sox	1996	
Victor Rodríguez	Baltimore Orioles	1984–1989	
Ed Romero	Milwaukee Brewers	1977–1989	
J. C. Romero	Minnesota Twins	1999–2012	
Gil Rondón	Houston Astros	1976–1979	
Jorge Roque	St. Louis Cardinals	1970–1973	
Jose Rosado	Kansas City Royals	1996–2000	
Luis Rosado	New York Mets	1977–1980	
Eddie Rosario	Minnesota Twins	2015–present	
Jimmy Rosario	San Francisco Giants	1971–1976	
Santiago Rosario	Kansas City Athletics	1965	
Dave Rosello	Chicago Cubs	1972–1981	
Rico Rossy	Atlanta Braves	1991–1998	
Chico Ruiz	Atlanta Braves	1978–1980	
Randy Ruiz	Minnesota Twins	2008–2010	
Ángel Sánchez	Kansas City Royals	2006–2013	
Jonathan Sánchez	San Francisco Giants	2006–2013	
Orlando Sánchez	St. Louis Cardinals	1981–1984	
Rey Sánchez	Chicago Cubs	1991–2005	
Benito Santiago	San Diego Padres	1986–2005	
Carlos Santiago	New York Cubans	1946	
Héctor Santiago	Chicago White Sox	2011–2021	
José "Pantalones" Santiago	New York Cubans	1948–1956	
José "Palillo" Santiago	Kansas City Athletics	1963–1970	
José Santiago	Kansas City Royals	1997–2005	
Rafael Santo Domingo	Cincinnati Reds	1979	
Ángel Santos	Boston Red Sox	2001–2003	
Omir Santos	Baltimore Orioles	2008–2013	
Candy Sierra	San Diego Padres	1988	
Rubén Sierra	Texas Rangers	1986–2006	
Jake Smith	San Diego Padres	2016	
Ian Snell	Pittsburgh Pirates	2004–2010	
Geovany Soto	Chicago Cubs	2005–2017	
Giovanni Soto	Cleveland Indians	2015	
Neftalí Soto	Cincinnati Reds	2013–2014	
George Springer	Houston Astros	2014–present	
Marcus Stroman	Toronto Blue Jays	2014–present	
Danny Tartabull	Seattle Mariners	1984–1997	
Valmy Thomas	New York Giants	1957–1961	
Dickie Thon	California Angels	1979–1993	
Andrés Torres	Detroit Tigers	2002–2013	
Bryan Torres	St.Louis Cardinals	2026	
Félix Torres	Los Angeles Angels	1962–1964	
Gacho Torres	Newark Stars	1926	
Rusty Torres	New York Yankees	1971–1980	
Lou Trivino	Oakland Athletics	2018–present	
Duane Underwood Jr.	Chicago Cubs	2018–2023	
Pedro Valdés	Chicago Cubs	1996–2000	
Javier Valentín	Minnesota Twins	1997–2008	
Jesmuel Valentín	Philadelphia Phillies	2018	
John Valentin	Boston Red Sox	1992–2002	
José Valentín	Milwaukee Brewers	1992–2007	
Julio Valera	New York Mets	1990–1996	
Héctor Valle	Los Angeles Dodgers	1965	
Eddie Vargas	Pittsburgh Pirates	1982–1984	
Kennys Vargas	Minnesota Twins	2014–2017	
Roberto Vargas	Chicago American Giants	1948–1955	
Christian Vázquez	Boston Red Sox	2014–present	
Javier Vázquez	Montreal Expos	1998–2011	
Luis Vázquez	Chicago Cubs	2024-2025	
Ramón Vázquez	Seattle Mariners	2001–2009	
Jesús Vega	Minnesota Twins	1979–1982	
Andrew Velazquez	Tampa Bay Rays	2018–2023	
Carlos Velázquez	Milwaukee Brewers	1973	
Nelson Velázquez	Chicago Cubs	2022-2024	
Otto Vélez	New York Yankees	1973–1983	
José Vidro	Montreal Expos	1997–2008	
Mark Vientos	New York Mets	2022–present	
Vicente Villafañe	Indianapolis Clowns	1947	
Héctor Villanueva	Chicago Cubs	1990–1993	
Ismael Villegas	Atlanta Braves	2000	
Luis Villodas	Baltimore Elite Giants	1946–1947	
Ozzie Virgil Jr.	Philadelphia Phillies	1980–1990	
Bernie Williams	New York Yankees	1991–2006	

== See also ==
- List of current Major League Baseball players by nationality
