= Rafael Cabrera =

Rafael Cabrera may refer to:

- Rafael Cabrera (baseball), Cuban baseball player
- Rafael Cabrera Camacho, Mexican poet, see Monument to Rafael Cabrera
- Rafael Cabrera Mustelier Airport or Rafael Cabrera Airport, Nueva Gerona, Isla de la Juventud, Cuba
