= Ladd White =

American baseball player (1917 – 1963)

- Pitcher
- Born: August 7, 1917; Redland, Oklahoma, U.S.
- Died: April 1, 1963 (aged 45); Contra Costa, California, U.S.

Negro league baseball debut
- 1946, for the Memphis Red Sox

Last appearance
- 1948, for the Indianapolis Clowns

Teams
- Memphis Red Sox (1946–1947); Indianapolis Clowns (1948)

Arstanda "Ladd" White (August 7, 1917 – April 1, 1963) was an American Negro league pitcher in the 1940s.

A native of Redland, Oklahoma, White made his Negro leagues debut in 1946 with the Memphis Red Sox. He played with Memphis again the following season, then played for the Indianapolis Clowns in 1948. White went on to play minor league baseball through 1950 with the Leavenworth Braves and Drummondville Cubs. He died in Contra Costa, California in 1963 at age 45.
