= Hiram Bithorn =

Puerto Rican baseball player (1916–1951)

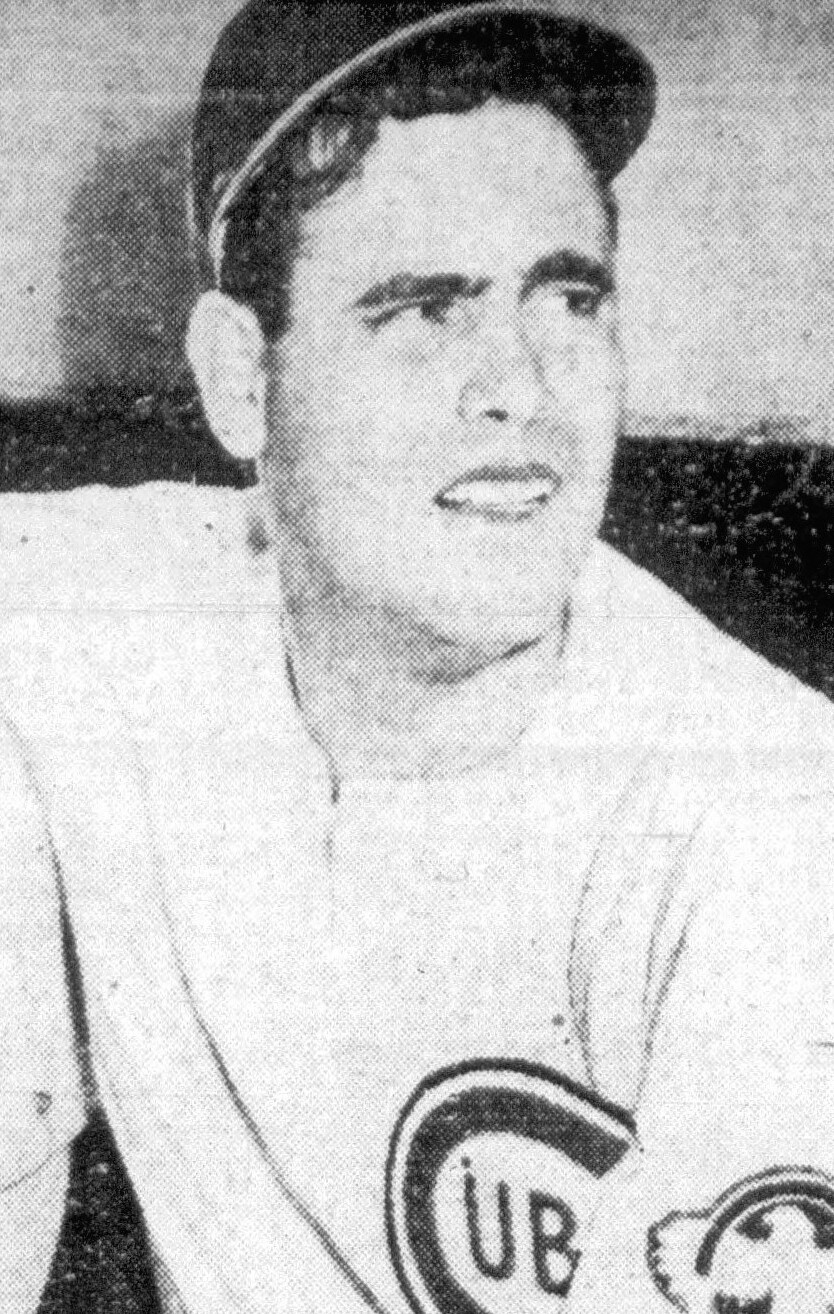
- Bithorn, circa 1945
- Pitcher
- Born: March 18, 1916; Santurce, San Juan, Puerto Rico
- Died: December 29, 1951 (aged 35); Ciudad Victoria, Tamaulipas, Mexico
- Batted: Right Threw: Right

MLB debut
- April 15, 1942, for the Chicago Cubs

Last MLB appearance
- May 4, 1947, for the Chicago White Sox

MLB statistics
- Win–loss record: 34–31
- Earned run average: 3.16
- Strikeouts: 185
- Stats at Baseball Reference

Teams
- Chicago Cubs (1942–1943, 1946); Chicago White Sox (1947)

Hiram Gabriel Bithorn Sosa (March 18, 1916 – December 29, 1951) was a Puerto Rican professional right-handed pitcher who became the first baseball player from Puerto Rico to play in affiliated Major League Baseball. (Note: Bithorn was not the first Puerto Rican to play in a recognized major league. Gacho Torres debuted with the Newark Stars of the Eastern Colored League (ECL) in 1926; the ECL is now one of the six historical Negro leagues recognized as a major league by MLB.)

Standing 6 feet 1 inch (1.85 m) and weighing about 200 pounds (90 kg), Bithorn was a hard-throwing pitcher who commanded attention when he began his delivery with a distinctive windup, raising his long left leg high in the air and throwing a blazing fastball toward home plate.

== Early life ==
Of mixed Danish-German-Scottish and Spanish descent, Bithorn was born as Hiram Gabriel Bithorn Sosa in Santurce, a heavily populated area in the city of San Juan, and was one of five children born to Waldemar G. Bithorn, a municipal employee, and María Sosa, a public school teacher. The Bithorn family traveled frequently to the United States. María taught her children English and at one time produced a radio program called Abuelita Borinqueña (Puerto Rican Grandmother). The young Hiram attended Central High School in Santurce, and his two older brothers, 11 and 10 years his senior, encouraged and assisted in training him to become an athlete.

In 1935, Bithorn competed in the III Central American and Caribbean Games held in San Salvador, El Salvador, helping his Puerto Rican teammates bring home a silver medal in volleyball and a bronze in basketball. By this time, he had already begun making a name for himself in baseball in 1932, while pitching on a team of nativos playing in the city of Guayama. The Puerto Ricans faced the Richmond BBC, a squad composed entirely of continental American players, including slugging first baseman and future Hall of Famer Johnny Mize, as the 16-year-old Bithorn led his team to a 10–1 victory over the visiting club.

== Baseball career ==
Bithorn played winter ball for his home team Senadores de San Juan. When San Juan manager Juan Torruella resigned only two weeks into the 1938 season, the Senadores chose 22-year-old Bithorn as their new skipper, making him the youngest manager in Puerto Rican Professional Baseball League history. Within three years, Bithorn was pitching at Wrigley Field.

In 1939 Bithorn played in the US Minor Leagues, pitching for three seasons for the AA clubs Oakland Oaks and Hollywood Stars.

Bithorn was signed by the Chicago Cubs in September 1941 and debuted in the Major Leagues on April 15, 1942, making history as the first Puerto Rican to play in organized baseball. Bithorn won nine games and lost 14 in his first season, but he rebounded in 1943 by going 18–12 with an earned run average of 2.60 and completing 19 of his 30 starts, leading the league in shutouts with seven, establishing a record for Puerto Rican pitchers that still stands to this day. During this time, he also formed the second Latin American pitcher-catcher combination along with Cuban Chico Hernández.

On November 26, 1943, after his second season, Bithorn joined the United States Navy. While in the Navy, he served at Naval Air Station San Juan in Puerto Rico where he became the player-manager for the baseball team at the station. He received his honorable discharge from the Navy on September 1, 1945. His promising start did not last once he returned from military service. By this moment his weight had risen to 225 pounds, which led to rumors that he may not have the same abilities. Upon returning from the war, he returned to the Chicago Cubs, and went 6–5 in 1946. On January 25, 1947, he was purchased by the Pittsburgh Pirates only to be waived later. On March 22 of the same year, the Chicago White Sox selected him off waivers but only pitched two innings, developing a sore arm that ended his career.

In a four-season career, Bithorn posted a 34–31 record with a 3.16 ERA in 105 pitching appearances (53 as a starter), including 30 complete games, eight shutouts and five saves, striking out 185 batters while walking 171 in 509 2/3 innings of work.

== Later years ==
At age 35, Bithorn tried to make a comeback in the Mexican Pacific League. He was shot by Mexican police officer Ambrosio Castillo Cano on December 28, 1951, in El Mante, Tamaulipas, Mexico. Bithorn then was transferred to Ciudad Victoria's hospital, where he died the next day. Initially, Officer Castillo Cano claimed that Bithorn was violent and also admitted to being part of a communist cell, and that he was on an important mission. Eventually this argument was debunked in court and Castillo Cano was sentenced to eight years in prison for Bithorn's murder. He was buried at Buxeda Cemetery in Carolina, Puerto Rico.

Bithorn's achievement of making it to the majors remained a source of pride in Puerto Rico, and he was honored in 1962 when the biggest ballpark on the island was built and named after him. Hiram Bithorn Stadium is located next to Roberto Clemente Coliseum and across the street from Plaza Las Américas Mall, the stadium has also hosted world championship boxing fights, major professional wrestling events from the World Wrestling Council, the 1979 Pan American Games, and important musical spectacles. The Montreal Expos played 22 home games there in the 2003 and 2004 MLB seasons, while Rounds 1 and 2 of the 2006 and 2009 World Baseball Classic editions also were played there, including teams from Group C and Group D. In 2013 the World Baseball Classic Round 1, Pool C was played in the stadium, featuring Dominican Republic, Puerto Rico, Spain and Venezuela national teams.

== See also ==
- List of Puerto Ricans
- List of players from Puerto Rico in Major League Baseball
- Baseball in Puerto Rico
- Sports in Puerto Rico
- List of countries with their first Major League Baseball player
