= Raúl Navarro =

Raúl Navarro may refer to:

- Raúl Navarro (baseball) (1921–1999), Cuban baseball outfielder
- Raúl Navarro (footballer) (born 1994), Spanish football right-back
