= John McQueen (disambiguation) =

John McQueen (1804–1867) was an American lawyer and politician.

John McQueen may also refer to:

- John C. McQueen (1899–1985), United States Marine Corps general
- John Henry McQueen (1916–1977), American Negro league outfielder
- John Paul McQueen, a fictional character from the British soap opera Hollyoaks
- John McQueen (sculptor) (1943–2025), American sculptor

== See also ==
- John McQueen Johnston (1901–1987), Scottish physician and pharmacologist
