= Reginald R. Howard =

American Negro League Baseball Player and Manager

Reginald R. Howard was an infielder for the Indianapolis Clowns during the 1950s and 1960s. Born in South Bend, Indiana, he encountered systemic barriers that limited opportunities for Black athletes in baseball. He recalled that Black students were often steered toward track and field, as coaches discouraged their participation in baseball, reflecting broader societal efforts to marginalize Black players from the sport. He would go on to manage the Clowns.

== Baseball ==
Reginald R. Howard played with the Indianapolis Clowns in the 1950s and early 1960s during the latter days of Negro League baseball. An infielder, Howard played when the Clowns shifted from league competition to barnstorming exhibitions. There are few records for individual players for the Negro league although Howard was playing during a successful time for the Clowns.

- 1950: Secured the first-half Eastern Division title with a 47–38–2 record. Due to league decisions, they were awarded the second-half title as well, though no playoff was held against the Kansas City Monarchs.
- 1951: Finished with a 53–26 record, winning the NAL divisional playoff against the Kansas City Monarchs.
- 1952: Achieved a 44–30 record and won the NAL split-season playoff against the Birmingham Black Barons.
- 1953: Recorded a 31–43–1 season, finishing third in the league.
- 1954: Compiled a 43–22 record, winning both the first and second halves of the season, thus clinching the NAL pennant outright.

After 1954, the Clowns withdrew from the Negro American League and operated as an independent barnstorming team. They continued to play exhibition games across the United States and internationally. This period saw the team embracing a style akin to the Harlem Globetrotters, featuring performances like "shadow ball" and other on-field antics to engage audiences.

In 1967, they signed Satchel Paige, then in his 60s, to pitch for $1,000 per month, aiming to attract larger audiences. The following year, they broke another barrier by integrating their roster with their first white player. These moves, along with hiring former Chicago model Nancy Miller as an umpire in 1971 and 1972, were efforts to maintain fan interest during a challenging era for Negro League teams. Despite these efforts, the Clowns' focus shifted primarily to entertainment, with performances featuring exaggerated antics and comedic routines. They continued barnstorming into the 1980s before eventually disbanding in 1989. In 1979, Howard moved to Memphis, Tennessee, where he continued his advocacy for Black athletes and the history of the Negro Leagues. His efforts shed light on the experiences of Black baseball players and the obstacles they faced. Howard authored Baseball’s Silent Genocide: How They Cut Black Youth Out of Baseball, published in June 2023.
