= Dreke =

Dreke is a surname. Notable people with the surname include:

- Luis Dreke (born 1953), Cuban footballer
- Valentín Dreke (1898–1929), Cuban baseball outfielder in the Negro leagues
- Víctor Dreke (born 1937), Cuban Communist Party leader and soldier

== See also ==
- Reinaldo Drake (born 1923), sometimes spelled Dreke, Cuban baseball outfielder in the Negro leagues
