= Manuel Godínez =

Cuban baseball player (born 1921)

- Pitcher
- Born: 1921; Cuba

Negro league baseball debut
- 1946, for the Indianapolis Clowns

Last appearance
- 1948, for the Indianapolis Clowns
- Stats at Baseball Reference

Teams
- Indianapolis Clowns (1946–1948)

Manuel Godínez (born 1921) was a Cuban professional baseball pitcher in the Negro leagues who played in the 1940s.

Godínez made his Negro leagues debut in 1946 with the Indianapolis Clowns. He played three seasons with Indianapolis, and went on to play for the Brandon Grays of the Mandak League in 1950.
