= Chuck Wilson (baseball) =

American baseball player

- Outfielder
- Born: November 19, 1929; Sanford, Florida, U.S.
- Died: April 15, 1983 (aged 53); Sanford, Florida, U.S.
- Batted: Left Threw: Right

Negro league baseball debut
- 1948, for the Indianapolis Clowns

Last appearance
- 1949, for the Indianapolis Clowns

Teams
- Indianapolis Clowns (1948–1949)

Charlie Wilson Jr. (November 19, 1929 – April 15, 1983) was an American Negro league outfielder in the 1940s.

A native of Sanford, Florida, Wilson made his Negro leagues debut in 1948 with the Indianapolis Clowns, and played with Indianapolis again in 1949. He went on to play minor league baseball in the Mandak League with the Brandon Grays into the 1950s. Wilson died in Sanford in 1983 at age 53.
