= Bill Barnes (pitcher) =

American baseball player (1919–1996)

- Pitcher
- Born: December 29, 1919; Birmingham, Alabama, U.S.
- Died: November 21, 1996 (aged 76); Bessemer, Alabama, U.S.
- Batted: Right Threw: Right

Negro league baseball debut
- 1941, for the Baltimore Elite Giants

Last appearance
- 1947, for the Indianapolis Clowns
- Stats at Baseball Reference

Teams
- Baltimore Elite Giants (1941–1942, 1946); Memphis Red Sox (1943); Indianapolis Clowns (1947)

William Barnes (December 29, 1919 – November 21, 1996) was an American professional baseball pitcher in the Negro leagues. He played from 1941 to 1947 with the Baltimore Elite Giants, Memphis Red Sox, and the Indianapolis Clowns. He did not play in 1944 and 1945 due to military service in World War II.

== Personal life ==
Barnes served in the United States Army during World War II, and worked as a military policeman in California.

He worked for car manufactures Chrysler and Ford Motors before retiring in 1986.
