= Koney Williams =

American baseball player

- Shortstop
- Born: December 18, 1919; Harrodsburg, Kentucky, U.S.
- Died: October 3, 1977 (aged 57); Lexington, Kentucky

Negro league baseball debut
- 1948, for the Indianapolis Clowns

Last appearance
- 1948, for the Indianapolis Clowns

Teams
- Indianapolis Clowns (1948)

Laconia Grant "Koney" Williams (December 18, 1919 – October 3, 1977) was a Negro league shortstop who played in the 1940s.

Williams played for the Indianapolis Clowns in 1948. In nine recorded games, he posted three hits in 26 plate appearances.
