= Len Pigg =

American baseball player (1919-1993)

- Catcher
- Born: September 18, 1919; Grant, Oklahoma, U.S.
- Died: August 22, 1993 (aged 73); Seattle, Washington, U.S.
- Batted: Right Threw: Right

Negro league baseball debut
- 1947, for the Indianapolis Clowns

Last appearance
- 1951, for the Indianapolis Clowns

Teams
- Indianapolis Clowns (1947–1951)

Leonard Daniel Pigg (September 18, 1919 – August 22, 1993), nicknamed "Fatty", was an American Negro league baseball catcher in the 1940s and 1950s.

A native of Grant, Oklahoma, Pigg served in the US Army during World War II. He made his Negro leagues debut with the Indianapolis Clowns in 1947, and played for the team for several seasons. Pigg also played for the Carman Cardinals and Brandon Greys of the Mandak League. He died in Seattle, Washington in 1993 at age 73.
