= Lázaro Medina =

Cuban baseball player (born 1922)

- Pitcher
- Born: October 22, 1922; Quivicán, Cuba
- Batted: Left Threw: Right

Negro league baseball debut
- 1944, for the Cincinnati-Indianapolis Clowns

Last appearance
- 1945, for the Cincinnati-Indianapolis Clowns

Negro American League statistics
- Win–loss record: 1–8
- Earned run average: 5.05
- Strikeouts: 47

Teams
- Cincinnati-Indianapolis Clowns (1944–1945); Alijadores de Tampico (1946–1947); Tuneros de San Luis (1947); Industriales de Monterrey (1947); Diablos Rojos del Mexico (1948); Drummondville Cubs (1949)

Lázaro Medina (born October 22, 1922), sometimes listed as "Leonardo", was a Cuban professional baseball pitcher who played in the Negro leagues, Mexican League and Provincial League in the 1940s.

A native of Quivicán, Cuba, Medina made his Negro leagues debut in 1944 with the Cincinnati-Indianapolis Clowns, and played with the club again in 1945. He went on to play for Alijadores de Tampico of the Mexican League in 1946 and 1947; in the latter, Medina also appeared in games for Tuneros de San Luis and Diablos Rojos del Mexico, who also competed in the Mexican League. Medina's last season in the Mexican League was 1948, in which he played with Diablos Rojos del Mexico. In 1949, Medina played for the Drummondville Cubs of the Provincial League.
