= Leroy Cromartie =

American baseball player (1922–2000)

- Second baseman
- Born: December 15, 1922; Miami, Florida
- Died: September 14, 2000 (aged 77); Miami, Florida

Negro league baseball debut
- 1945, for the Indianapolis Clowns

Last appearance
- 1945, for the Indianapolis Clowns
- Stats at Baseball Reference

Teams
- Indianapolis Clowns (1945)

Leroy Oliver Cromartie (December 15, 1922 – September 14, 2000) was an American Negro league second baseman in the 1940s.

A native of Miami, Florida, Cromartie graduated from Booker T. Washington Senior High School in 1943. He went on to play college football for Florida A&M, where he was an All-America selection. Cromartie played in the Negro leagues for the Indianapolis Clowns in 1945, and was the father of fellow major leaguer Warren Cromartie. He died in Miami in 2000 at age 77.
