= George Daniels (baseball) =

American baseball player

- Pitcher

Negro league baseball debut
- 1943, for the Cincinnati Clowns

Last appearance
- 1943, for the Cincinnati Clowns

Teams
- Cincinnati Clowns (1943)

George Daniels is an American former Negro league pitcher who played in the 1940s.

Daniels played for the Cincinnati Clowns in 1943. In four recorded games, he posted a 3.13 ERA over 23 innings.
