= Brennan King =

American baseball player

- Pitcher
- Born: August 16, 1916; Butte, Montana, U.S.
- Died: December 5, 1978 (aged 62); Seattle, Washington, U.S.
- Threw: Right

Negro league baseball debut
- 1943, for the Cincinnati Clowns

Last appearance
- 1944, for the Atlanta Black Crackers

Teams
- Cincinnati Clowns (1943); Atlanta Black Crackers (1944)

Brennan Leon King (August 16, 1916 – December 5, 1978) was an American Negro league pitcher in the 1940s.

A native of Butte, Montana, King attended North Carolina A&T State University. He played for the Cincinnati Clowns in 1943, and for the Atlanta Black Crackers the following season. King died in Seattle, Washington in 1978 at age 62.
