= Perry Hall (baseball) =

American baseball player

- Infielder
- Born: April 18, 1898; Hogansville, Georgia, U.S.
- Died: February 3, 1993 (aged 94); Chicago, Illinois, U.S.
- Batted: Right Threw: Right

Negro league baseball debut
- 1921, for the St. Louis Giants

Last appearance
- 1943, for the Baltimore Elite Giants

Career statistics
- Batting average: .314
- Home runs: 2
- Runs batted in: 14
- Stats at Baseball Reference

Teams
- St. Louis Giants (1921); Detroit Stars (1921); St. Louis Stars (1922); Milwaukee Bears (1923); Detroit Stars (1926); Memphis Red Sox (1927); Birmingham Black Barons (1928); Cleveland Tigers (1928); Bacharach Giants (1929); Chicago Columbia Giants (1931); Indianapolis Athletics (1937); Cincinnati Clowns (1943)

Perry Hall (April 18, 1898 – February 3, 1993) was an American Negro league infielder between 1921 and 1943.

A native of Hogansville, Georgia, Hall made his Negro leagues debut in 1921 for the St. Louis Giants and Detroit Stars. He went on to play with several teams, including the Birmingham Black Barons and Bacharach Giants, and finished his career in 1943 with a brief stint with the Cincinnati Clowns. Hall died in Chicago, Illinois in 1993 at age 94.
