= Lefty Calhoun =

American baseball player

- Pitcher
- Born: August 21, 1911; Union City, Tennessee, U.S.
- Died: October 2, 1976 (aged 65); Cleveland, Ohio, U.S.
- Batted: Left Threw: Left

Negro league baseball debut
- 1932, for the Montgomery Grey Sox

Last appearance
- 1946, for the Indianapolis Clowns
- Stats at Baseball Reference

Teams
- Montgomery Grey Sox (1932); Memphis Red Sox (1932, 1937); Indianapolis ABCs/St. Louis Stars/St. Louis–New Orleans Stars/Harrisburg Stars (1938-1941, 1943); Philadelphia Stars (1942); New York Black Yankees (1942); Indianapolis Clowns (1946)

Walter Allen Calhoun (August 21, 1911 – October 2, 1976), nicknamed "Lefty", was an American Negro league pitcher in the 1930s and 1940s.

A native of Union City, Tennessee, Calhoun made his Negro leagues debut in 1932 with the Montgomery Grey Sox and Memphis Red Sox. He went on to play for several teams, and was selected to represent the St. Louis–New Orleans Stars in the 1940 East–West All-Star Game. Calhoun finished his career in 1946 with the Indianapolis Clowns. He died in Cleveland, Ohio in 1976 at age 65.
