= T. J. Brown (baseball) =

American baseball player

- Shortstop
- Born: August 18, 1915; Des Moines, Iowa, U.S.
- Died: November 22, 1973 (aged 58); East Moline, Illinois, U.S.
- Batted: Right Threw: Right

Negro league baseball debut
- 1939, for the Memphis Red Sox

Last appearance
- 1950, for the Memphis Red Sox
- Stats at Baseball Reference

Teams
- Memphis Red Sox (1939–1945); Chicago American Giants (1944); Indianapolis Clowns (1947); Memphis Red Sox (1947–1950)

Thomas Julius Brown (August 18, 1915 – November 22, 1973) was an American Negro league shortstop from 1939 to 1950.

A native of Des Moines, Iowa, Brown attended East Moline High School in East Moline, Illinois. He made his Negro leagues debut in 1939 for the Memphis Red Sox, and spent the majority of his career with the club, playing his final season with Memphis in 1950. Brown was selected to play in the East–West All-Star Game in 1942, and spent 1946 out of baseball serving in the United States Army. After his Negro leagues career, he went on to play minor league baseball through 1953. Brown died in East Moline in 1973 at age 58.
