= Peanuts Davis =

American baseball player (1917–1973)

- Pitcher
- Born: August 26, 1917; Jackson, Mississippi, U.S.
- Died: May 13, 1973 (aged 55)
- Batted: Right Threw: Right

Negro league baseball debut
- 1939, for the Miami Ethiopian Clowns

Last appearance
- 1951, for the Indianapolis–Cincinnati Clowns
- Stats at Baseball Reference

Teams
- Indianapolis–Cincinnati Clowns (1941–1943, 1946, 1949-1950)

Edward Arnett Davis (August 26, 1917 – May 13, 1973), nicknamed "Peanuts", was an American Negro league pitcher in the late 1930s, throughout the 1940s, and into the early 1950s. He sometimes used the pseudonym "Peanuts Nyasses" when playing baseball for iterations of the Clowns in Miami, Cincinnati, and Indianapolis. He was often called the "Clown Prince of Negro Baseball" by sportswriters who saw him play. But the sportswriters also acknowledged that in addition to clowning, he was considered "one of the top pitchers in Negro baseball;" in fact, many fans believed he was as talented as the much better-known Satchel Paige. Davis was also praised for his versatility. "He’s a brilliant hurler...and a standout also if stationed anywhere in the outfield or infield."

Little is known about Davis's childhood. He was a native of Jackson, Mississippi, and he supposedly got the nickname "Peanuts" from working as a vendor at local minor league baseball games, where he sold roasted peanuts "more rapidly than any of his boyhood rivals." Another version of how he got the nickname states that his first job was bagging the peanuts, prior to their being sold at the ballpark. He attended high school in Jackson, and maintained ties to the area: he later raised his own family there. Davis played off-and-on for the various iterations of the Clowns, first in Miami, and later for the Indianapolis–Cincinnati Clowns between 1939 and 1946, and again beginning in 1949. His baseball career was interrupted by World War II, and he played for an Army team at Fort Benning, Georgia for three years, while fulfilling his military service. He was discharged from the Army in early May 1946 and rejoined the Clowns. In addition to his skill at being a comedian, he was known for having an impressive knuckle ball; he even defeated Satchel Paige on several occasions during his career. But perhaps his most noteworthy pitching feat occurred during a 20-inning game against the Chicago American Giants. Both he and opposing pitcher Gentry Jessup were locked in a pitching duel that was finally called because of darkness. Both men pitched all 20 innings.

At some point, he left the Clowns, and returned in the spring of 1949. The newspapers said he had "jumped" his club and pitched elsewhere, evidently in violation of his contract; he was reinstated in time for the 1949 season. He returned to pitch some games for the Clowns in 1950, but in 1951, he got into a contract dispute with the team's ownership, and was suspended from the team. He decided to retire, but by late 1951, he had joined a semipro team in Jacksonville, Florida, the Jacksonville Eagles. Little is known about his later years. He died on May 13, 1973, at age 55.

== Sources ==
- Peanuts Davis at SABR (Baseball BioProject)
