= Andrés Mesa =

Cuban baseball player (born 1919)

- Outfielder
- Born: February 2, 1918; Jovellanos, Cuba
- Died: September 27, 1994 (aged 76)

Negro league baseball debut
- 1948, for the Indianapolis Clowns

Last appearance
- 1948, for the Indianapolis Clowns

Negro American League statistics
- Batting average: .265
- Home runs: 0
- Runs batted in: 4

Teams
- Indianapolis Clowns (1948)

Andrés A. Mesa (February 2, 1918 - September 27, 1994) was a Cuban professional baseball outfielder in the Negro leagues. He played with Indianapolis Clowns in 1948.
