= Henry Merchant =

American baseball player

- Outfielder
- Born: February 17, 1918; Birmingham, Alabama, U.S.
- Died: August 23, 1982 (aged 64); Cincinnati, Ohio, U.S.
- Batted: Left Threw: Left

Negro league baseball debut
- 1940, for the Chicago American Giants

Last appearance
- 1954, for the Indianapolis Clowns

Teams
- Chicago American Giants (1940–1942); Cincinnati Clowns (1943–1945); Indianapolis Clowns (1946–1954)

Henry Lewis Merchant (February 17, 1918 – August 23, 1982), nicknamed "Speed", was an American Negro league outfielder in the 1940s and 1950s.

A native of Birmingham, Alabama, Merchant made his Negro leagues debut in 1940 for the Chicago American Giants. He spent many years with the Cincinnati/Indianapolis Clowns, and was selected to represent Indianapolis in the East–West All-Star Game in 1950 and 1952. Merchant died in Cincinnati, Ohio in 1982 at age 64.
