= Chester Moody =

American baseball player

- Born: March 2, 1935
- Died: September 21, 2013 (aged 78)
- Batted: ? Threw: ?

Teams
- New York Black Yankees (1956); Indianapolis Clowns

Roy Chester Moody (March 2, 1935 – September 21, 2013) was an American baseball player who played in the Negro leagues during their dying days. He played for the New York Black Yankees in 1956 and for the Indianapolis Clowns at one point.
