= Armando Vázquez =

Cuban baseball player (born 1923)

- First baseman / Pitcher / Right fielder
- Born: August 20, 1923; Güines, Cuba
- Died: March 16, 2008 (aged 84); New York, New York, U.S.
- Batted: Left Threw: Left

Negro league baseball debut
- 1944, for the Cincinnati-Indianapolis Clowns

Last appearance
- 1948, for the New York Cubans

Teams
- Cincinnati-Indianapolis Clowns (1944–1945); New York Cubans (1945–1946); Cincinnati-Indianapolis Clowns (1947); New York Cubans (1948)

Armando Bernando Vázquez Cotilla (August 20, 1923 - March 16, 2008) was a Cuban professional baseball first baseman, right fielder and pitcher in the Negro leagues. He played from 1944 to 1948 with the Cincinnati-Indianapolis Clowns and New York Cubans.
