= Al McCoy (baseball) =

American baseball player

- Infielder
- Born: August 12, 1928; St. Petersburg, Florida
- Died: April 16, 2006 (aged 77); Tallahassee, Florida

Negro league baseball debut
- 1946, for the Indianapolis Clowns

Last appearance
- 1947, for the New York Black Yankees

Teams
- Indianapolis Clowns (1946); New York Black Yankees (1947)

Alfred B. McCoy (August 12, 1928 – April 16, 2006) was an American Negro league infielder in the 1940s.

A native of St. Petersburg, Florida, McCoy graduated from Gibbs High School in 1946. He played for the Indianapolis Clowns in 1946, and for the New York Black Yankees in 1947. McCoy went on to attend Florida A&M University where he was an All-SIAC second baseman in 1949 and graduated in 1951. He served in the US Air Force from 1951 to 1955, and went on to a career in teaching and coaching. In 1987 and 1988, McCoy was the head baseball coach at Paul Quinn College. He was inducted into the Florida A&M Athletic Hall of Fame in 1992, and died in Tallahassee, Florida in 2006 at age 77.
