= Harry Millon =

American baseball player

- Infielder
- Batted: Right Threw: Right

Negro league baseball debut
- 1946, for the Chicago American Giants

Last appearance
- 1947, for the Indianapolis Clowns

Teams
- Chicago American Giants (1946–1947); Indianapolis Clowns (1947)

Ralph Harold Millon is an American former Negro league infielder who played in the 1940s.

Millon made his Negro leagues debut in 1946 with the Chicago American Giants. The following season he split time between Chicago and the Indianapolis Clowns.
