= Dave Harper (baseball) =

American baseball player

- Outfielder
- Born: September 7, 1917; Conley, Georgia, U.S.
- Died: January 15, 1996 (aged 78); Atlanta, Georgia, U.S.
- Batted: Right Threw: Right

Negro league baseball debut
- 1943, for the Philadelphia Stars

Last appearance
- 1946, for the Birmingham Black Barons
- Stats at Baseball Reference

Teams
- Philadelphia Stars (1943); Atlanta Black Crackers (1943); Cincinnati Clowns (1943); Kansas City Monarchs (1944–45); Birmingham Black Barons (1946)

David Thimothy Harper (September 7, 1917 – January 15, 1996) was an American Negro league outfielder in the 1940s.

A native of Conley, Georgia, Harper attended Clark College. He made his Negro leagues debut playing for several teams in 1943. Harper spent 1944 and 1945 with the Kansas City Monarchs, and finished his career with the Birmingham Black Barons in 1946. He died in Atlanta, Georgia in 1996 at age 78.
