= Ben Adams (baseball) =

American baseball player (1936–2005)

- Pitcher
- Born: October 13, 1936; Norfolk, Virginia, U.S.
- Died: May 21, 2005 (aged 68); Grand Rapids, Michigan, U.S.

Negro league baseball debut
- 1952, for the Indianapolis Clowns

Last appearance
- 1959, for the Kansas City Monarchs

Teams
- Indianapolis Clowns (1952); Memphis Red Sox (1953); Kansas City Monarchs (1955–59)

Benjamin Franklin Adams (October 13, 1936 – May 21, 2005) was an American Negro league pitcher in the 1950s and 1960s.

A native of Norfolk, Virginia, Adams broke into the Negro leagues in 1952 with the Indianapolis Clowns. He played for a number of teams throughout the following years, including the Kansas City Monarchs. Adams retired in 1969, ending his career with 11 years with the Monarchs. He died in Grand Rapids, Michigan in 2005 at age 68.
