= Eddie Locke (baseball) =

American baseball player

- Outfielder
- Born: January 13, 1923; Gatesville, Texas, U.S.
- Died: March 2, 1992 (aged 69); Corpus Christi, Texas, U.S.
- Batted: Left Threw: Right

Negro league baseball debut
- 1943, for the Chicago American Giants

Last appearance
- 1950, for the New York Black Yankees

Teams
- Chicago American Giants (1943); Cincinnati Clowns (1943); Kansas City Monarchs (1943–1945, 1948–1949); New York Black Yankees (1949–1950)

Eddie Locke Jr. (January 13, 1923 – March 2, 1992) was an American Negro league outfielder between 1943 and 1950.

A native of Gatesville, Texas, Locke made his Negro leagues debut in 1943 with the Chicago American Giants, Cincinnati Clowns and the Kansas City Monarchs. He went on to play several seasons with the Monarchs, and also played for the New York Black Yankees. Locke played minor league baseball in the 1950s, including stints with the Springfield Giants and Vancouver Capilanos, and three seasons with the Amarillo Gold Sox. He died in Corpus Christi, Texas in 1992 at age 69.
