= Leovigildo Xiqués =

Cuban baseball player (1917–1956)

- Outfielder
- Born: September 23, 1917; Havana, Cuba
- Died: March 5, 1956 (aged 38); Havana, Cuba
- Batted: Right Threw: Right

Negro league baseball debut
- 1944, for the Indianapolis Clowns

Last appearance
- 1947, for the Indianapolis Clowns

Teams
- Cincinnati-Indianapolis Clowns (1944); Alijadores de Tampico (1945); Industriales de Monterrey (1945); Azules de Veracruz (1945); Cincinnati-Indianapolis Clowns (1946–1947)

Leovigildo Xiqués Lugo (September 23, 1917 – March 5, 1956), also known as "Leo Lugo", was a Cuban professional baseball outfielder in the Negro leagues and the Mexican League in the 1940s.

A native of Havana, Cuba, Xiqués made his Negro leagues debut in 1944 with the Cincinnati-Indianapolis Clowns. In 1945, he played spent time with three different teams in the Mexican League: Alijadores de Tampico, Industriales de Monterrey, and Azules de Veracruz. Xiqués returned to play for the Clowns in 1946 and 1947.
