= Jim Cohen (baseball) =

American baseball player

- Pitcher
- Born: May 26, 1918; Los Angeles, California, U.S.
- Died: April 23, 2002 (aged 84); Washington, D.C., U.S.
- Batted: Right Threw: Right

Negro league baseball debut
- 1946, for the Indianapolis Clowns

Last appearance
- 1952, for the Indianapolis Clowns
- Stats at Baseball Reference

Teams
- Indianapolis Clowns (1946–52)

James Clarence Cohen (May 26, 1918 – April 23, 2002), nicknamed "Fireball", was an American Negro league pitcher in the 1940s and 1950s.

A native of Evergreen, Alabama, Cohen served in the US Army at Camp Lee, Virginia, during World War II. He made his Negro leagues debut in 1946 for the Indianapolis Clowns, and pitched for the team through 1952. In 1948 he was selected to play in the East–West All-Star Game. Cohen died in Washington, D.C., in 2002 at age 84.
