= Collins Jones =

American baseball player

- Infielder
- Born: October 15, 1922; Macon, Georgia, U.S.
- Died: November 11, 1991 (aged 69); Detroit, Michigan, U.S.
- Batted: Both Threw: Right

Negro league baseball debut
- 1943, for the Cincinnati Clowns

Last appearance
- 1945, for the Birmingham Black Barons
- Stats at Baseball Reference

Teams
- Cincinnati Clowns (1943); Harrisburg–St. Louis Stars (1943); Birmingham Black Barons (1944–1945)

Collins Chesterfield Jones Jr. (October 15, 1922 – November 11, 1991), sometimes listed as "Collis", was an American Negro league baseball infielder in the 1940s.

A native of Macon, Georgia, Jones made his Negro leagues debut in 1943 with the Cincinnati Clowns and Harrisburg–St. Louis Stars. He went on to play for the Birmingham Black Barons the following two seasons. Jones died in Detroit, Michigan in 1991 at age 69.
