= Jimmie Bennett =

American baseball player

- Pitcher
- Born: August 8, 1919; Fredonia, Kentucky, U.S.
- Died: June 3, 1991 (aged 71); Indianapolis, Indiana, U.S.
- Batted: Unknown Threw: Unknown

Negro league baseball debut
- 1945, for the Indianapolis–Cincinnati Clowns

Last appearance
- 1948, for the Indianapolis Clowns
- Stats at Baseball Reference

Teams
- Indianapolis–Cincinnati Clowns (1945, 1948)

James Thomas "Fireball" Bennett (August 8, 1919 – June 3, 1991) was an American professional baseball pitcher in the Negro leagues. He played with the Indianapolis–Cincinnati Clowns in 1945 and 1948.

He also played for the Indianapolis Lincolns in 1948 and 1949, an Indianapolis ABCs team (not to be confused with the earlier Indianapolis ABCs club) in 1949, and the Winona Chiefs in 1952.
