= Ray Neil =

American baseball player

- Second baseman
- Born: October 12, 1920; Apopka, Florida, U.S.
- Died: July 10, 1998 (aged 77); St. Joseph, Michigan, U.S.
- Batted: Right Threw: Right

Negro league baseball debut
- 1941, for the Ethiopian Clowns

Last appearance
- 1954, for the Indianapolis Clowns

Teams
- Ethiopian Clowns (1941–1942); Cincinnati Clowns (1943); Indianapolis Clowns (1946–1954)

Raymond Neil (October 12, 1920 – July 10, 1998), nicknamed "Aussa" and "Tackolu", was an American Negro league second baseman in the 1940s and 1950s.

A native of Apopka, Florida, Neil played his entire career for the Indianapolis Clowns franchise, beginning in the early 1940s when the barnstorming club was known as the Ethiopian Clowns. He went 3-for-3 in the 1953 game and was among the league's top batters that season. Neil died in St. Joseph, Michigan in 1998 at age 77.
