= James Brown (baseball) =

American baseball player

- Left fielder / Pitcher
- Born: May 14, 1919; Scotland County, North Carolina, US
- Died: Unknown
- Batted: Left Threw: Right

Negro league baseball debut
- 1939, for the Newark Eagles

Last appearance
- 1947, for the Indianapolis–Cincinnati Clowns

Career statistics
- Batting average: .247
- Runs batted in: 23
- Win–loss record: 4–5
- Earned run average: 4.67
- Strikeouts: 35
- Stats at Baseball Reference

Teams
- Newark Eagles (1939–1943); Indianapolis–Cincinnati Clowns (1947)

James Brown (May 14, 1919 – death date unknown) was an American professional baseball left fielder and pitcher in the Negro leagues. He played with the Newark Eagles from 1939 to 1943 and the Indianapolis–Cincinnati Clowns in 1947.
