= Sam Odom =

American baseball player

- Pitcher
- Born: April 23, 1919; Gordon, Georgia, U.S.
- Died: August 14, 1977 (aged 58); Cincinnati, Ohio, U.S.
- Threw: Left

Negro league baseball debut
- 1946, for the Indianapolis Clowns

Last appearance
- 1946, for the Indianapolis Clowns

Teams
- Indianapolis Clowns (1946)

Samuel Odom (April 23, 1919 – August 14, 1977) was an American Negro league pitcher in the 1940s.

A native of Gordon, Georgia, Odom played for the Indianapolis Clowns in 1946. He died in Cincinnati, Ohio in 1977 at age 58.
