= Tice James =

American baseball player

- Shortstop
- Born: December 14, 1914; Key West, Florida, U.S.
- Died: March 13, 1989 (aged 74); Wiggins, Mississippi, U.S.
- Batted: Right Threw: Right

Negro league baseball debut
- 1936, for the Chicago American Giants

Last appearance
- 1946, for the Indianapolis Clowns
- Stats at Baseball Reference

Teams
- Chicago American Giants (1936, 1941); Memphis Red Sox (1941); Cleveland Buckeyes (1942); Indianapolis Clowns (1946)

Tice Livingston James (December 14, 1914 – March 13, 1989), nicknamed "Winky", was an American Negro league shortstop between 1936 and 1946.

A native of Key West, Florida, James made his Negro leagues debut in 1936 with the Chicago American Giants, and played for the club again in 1941. He also played for the Memphis Red Sox and Cleveland Buckeyes, and finished his career with a short stint with the Indianapolis Clowns in 1946. James died in Wiggins, Mississippi in 1989 at age 74.
