= Les Witherspoon =

American baseball player

- Outfielder
- Born: June 7, 1926; Kissimmee, Florida, U.S.
- Died: March 15, 1980 (aged 53); Miami, Florida, U.S.
- Batted: Both Threw: Right

Negro league baseball debut
- 1948, for the Indianapolis Clowns

Last appearance
- 1948, for the Indianapolis Clowns

Teams
- Indianapolis Clowns (1948)

Lester Rudolph Witherspoon (June 7, 1926 – March 15, 1980) was an American Negro league outfielder in the 1940s.

Witherspoon, a native of Kissimmee, Florida, played for the Indianapolis Clowns in 1948. In five recorded games, he recorded five hits in 17 plate appearances. He later went on to play minor league baseball throughout the 1950s with such clubs as the San Diego Padres, Salem Senators, and Texas City Texans. Witherspoon passed away in Miami, Florida in 1980 at age 53.
