= Specs Roberts =

American baseball player (1907–1984)

Charles Roberts
- Pitcher
- Born: September 7, 1907; High Point, North Carolina, U.S.
- Died: September 10, 1984 (aged 77); Fort Worth, Texas, U.S.
- Threw: Right

Negro league baseball debut
- 1936, for the Bacharach Giants

Last appearance
- 1945, for the Newark Eagles

Teams
- Bacharach Giants (1936); Philadelphia Stars (1937); Washington Black Senators (1938); Homestead Grays (1938–1940); New York Black Yankees (1941); Philadelphia Stars (1942); New York Black Yankees (1943–1944); Indianapolis–Cincinnati Clowns (1944); Newark Eagles (1945)

Charles W. Roberts (September 7, 1907 – September 10, 1984), nicknamed "Specs", was an American Negro league pitcher who played in the 1930s and 1940s.

A native of High Point, North Carolina, Roberts made his Negro leagues debut in 1936 with the Bacharach Giants. He went on to play for several teams, including the Homestead Grays and New York Black Yankees, and finished his career in 1945 with the Newark Eagles. Roberts died in Fort Worth, Texas in 1984 at age 77.
