= Alex Colthirst =

Panamanian baseball player (born 1918)

- Shortstop
- Born: November 21, 1918; Colón, Panama
- Died: November 24, 1991 (aged 73); Brooklyn, New York, U.S.
- Batted: Right Threw: Right

Negro league baseball debut
- 1948, for the Indianapolis Clowns

Last appearance
- 1948, for the Indianapolis Clowns

Career statistics
- Batting average: .125
- Home runs: 0
- Runs batted in: 1
- Stats at Baseball Reference

Teams
- Indianapolis Clowns (1948)

Alexander C. Colthirst (November 21, 1918 – November 24, 1991) was a Panamanian professional baseball shortstop in the Negro leagues. He played with the Indianapolis Clowns in 1948.
