= Albert Overton =

American baseball player

- Pitcher
- Born: August 29, 1903; Austin, Texas, U.S.
- Died: November 5, 1988 (aged 85); Galveston, Texas, U.S.

Negro league baseball debut
- 1932, for the Little Rock Grays

Last appearance
- 1944, for the Indianapolis–Cincinnati Clowns

Teams
- Little Rock Grays (1932); Philadelphia Stars (1937); Indianapolis–Cincinnati Clowns (1944)

Albert Overton (August 29, 1903 – November 5, 1988) was an American Negro league pitcher in the 1930s and 1940s.

A native of Austin, Texas, Overton made his Negro leagues debut in 1932 with the Little Rock Grays. He went on to play for the Philadelphia Stars and Indianapolis–Cincinnati Clowns. Overton died in Galveston, Texas in 1988 at age 85.

He is the great-uncle-in-law of former Toronto Blue Jays outfielder Jesse Barfield
