= Richard King (baseball) =

American baseball player

- First baseman
- Born: September 15, 1904; Jacksonville, Florida, U.S.
- Died: December 29, 1966 (aged 62); Philadelphia, Pennsylvania, U.S.
- Batted: Right Threw: Right

Negro league baseball debut
- 1943, for the Cincinnati Clowns

Last appearance
- 1948, for the Indianapolis Clowns

Teams
- Cincinnati/Indianapolis Clowns (1943, 1945, 1948)

Richard Elmer "King Tut" King (September 15, 1904 - December 29, 1966) was an American professional baseball first baseman in the Negro leagues. He played with the Cincinnati/Indianapolis Clowns in 1943, 1945, and 1948.

King was known more for performing pantomime comedy acts than his playing ability. He often worked alongside dwarf Spec Bebop, where the two performed a rowboat routine. King was also known for his oversized first baseman's mitt. He eventually transitioned away from playing altogether, but remained associated with the Clowns until his retirement in 1959.

King was known for giving away baseballs to fans. In the 1940s, the cost of a baseball was more than the $1.25 cost of an entry ticket, but the league's executive and financial manager Syd Pollock permitted King's eccentricity.
