= Greene Farmer =

- Outfielder
- Born: September 8, 1919; Spring Creek, Arkansas, U.S.
- Died: May 20, 1982 (aged 62); San Diego, California, U.S.
- Batted: Left Threw: Right

Negro league baseball debut
- 1942, for the New York Black Yankees

Last appearance
- 1947, for the New York Black Yankees
- Stats at Baseball Reference

Teams
- New York Black Yankees (1942, 1947); Cincinnati/Indianapolis Clowns (1945); New York Cubans (1945)

Greene Farmer Jr. (September 8, 1919 – May 20, 1982) was an American professional baseball outfielder in the Negro leagues. He played from 1942 to 1947 with the New York Black Yankees, Cincinnati/Indianapolis Clowns, and New York Cubans.
