= Willie Cathey =

American baseball player

- Pitcher
- Batted: Left Threw: Left

Negro league baseball debut
- 1948, for the Indianapolis Clowns

Last appearance
- 1948, for the Indianapolis Clowns

Teams
- Indianapolis Clowns (1948)

Willie Cathey is an American former Negro league pitcher who played in the 1940s.

Cathey played for the Indianapolis Clowns in 1948. He went on to play minor league baseball for the Minot Mallards of the Mandak League in 1950 and 1951.
