= John Huber (baseball) =

American baseball player

- Pitcher
- Born: April 26, 1908; Lexington, Kentucky, U.S.
- Died: January 31, 1964 (aged 55); Hartselle, Alabama, U.S.
- Batted: Left Threw: Right

Negro league baseball debut
- 1941, for the Philadelphia Stars

Last appearance
- 1947, for the Indianapolis Clowns
- Stats at Baseball Reference

Teams
- Philadelphia Stars (1941); Chicago American Giants (1942); Birmingham Black Barons (1943–1945); Memphis Red Sox (1946–1947); Indianapolis Clowns (1947)

John Marshall Huber (April 26, 1908 – January 31, 1964) was an American Negro league pitcher in the 1940s.

A native of Lexington, Kentucky, Huber made his Negro leagues debut in 1941 for the Philadelphia Stars. He went on to play for the Chicago American Giants, Birmingham Black Barons, and Memphis Red Sox, and finished his career in 1947 with the Indianapolis Clowns. Huber died in Hartselle, Alabama in 1964 at age 55.
