= Sylvester Snead =

American baseball player

- Infielder
- Born: September 18, 1914; Quincy, Florida, U.S.
- Died: May 21, 1995 (aged 80); Perry, Florida, U.S.
- Batted: Right Threw: Right

Negro league baseball debut
- 1938, for the Homestead Grays

Last appearance
- 1946, for the New York Black Yankees

Teams
- Homestead Grays (1938); Kansas City Monarchs (1941); Cincinnati Clowns (1943); New York Black Yankees (1946)

Sylvester Alonzo Snead (September 18, 1914 – May 21, 1995), nicknamed "Bo Gator", was an American Negro league infielder in the 1930s and 1940s.

A native of Quincy, Florida, Snead broke into the Negro leagues in 1938 with the Homestead Grays, and went on to play for the Kansas City Monarchs, Cincinnati Clowns, and New York Black Yankees. After his Negro league playing career, he played for the Elmwood Giants of the Mandak League in 1950, and split time in 1951 between the Drummondville Cubs and the St. Hyacinthe Saints of the Provincial League. In 1957, he returned to the Negro leagues to manage the Indianapolis Clowns. Snead died in Perry, Florida in 1995 at age 80.
