= Angel García (baseball) =

Cuban baseball player (born 1923)

- Pitcher
- Born: 1923; Cuba
- Threw: Right

Negro league baseball debut
- 1945, for the Cincinnati Clowns

Last appearance
- 1948, for the Indianapolis Clowns

Teams
- Cincinnati Clowns (1945); Indianapolis Clowns (1946, 1948)

Angel Luis García Gutiérrez (born 1923) was a Cuban professional baseball pitcher who played in the Negro leagues in the 1940s.

A native of Cuba, García played for the Cincinnati Clowns in 1945, and played again for the team in 1946 and 1948 after it had moved to Indianapolis. In eight recorded appearances on the mound, he posted a 3.78 ERA over 52.1 innings.
