= Amos Watson =

American baseball player

- Pitcher
- Born: February 26, 1926; Lake Alfred, Florida, U.S.
- Died: September 18, 1997 (aged 71); Winter Haven, Florida, U.S.
- Batted: Right Threw: Right

Negro league baseball debut
- 1945, for the Indianapolis Clowns

Last appearance
- 1947, for the Baltimore Elite Giants

Teams
- Indianapolis Clowns (1945–1946); Baltimore Elite Giants (1947)

Amos Watson (February 26, 1926 – September 18, 1997) was an American Negro league pitcher for the Indianapolis Clowns and Baltimore Elite Giants in the 1940s.

A native of Lake Alfred, Florida, Watson posted a 27–3 record on the mound as an eighteen-year-old for the barnstorming Jimmy Hill’s All-Stars in 1944. He died in Winter Haven, Florida in 1997 at age 71.
