= Felix Guilbe =

Puerto Rican baseball player (born 1924)

- Outfielder
- Born: March 2, 1924; Ponce, Puerto Rico
- Died: June 20, 2010 (aged 86); Ponce, Puerto Rico
- Batted: Right Threw: Right

Negro league baseball debut
- 1946, for the Baltimore Elite Giants

Last appearance
- 1947, for the Baltimore Elite Giants
- Stats at Baseball Reference

Teams
- Baltimore Elite Giants (1946–1947)

Felix Guilbe Colón (March 2, 1924 – June 20, 2010) was a Puerto Rican professional baseball outfielder in the American Negro leagues in the 1940s.

A native of Ponce, Puerto Rico, his brother, Juan Guilbe, also played in the Negro leagues and in Puerto Rico.

== Baseball career ==
Guilbe played in the Negro League for the Baltimore Elite Giants in 1946 and 1947. Where he batted .195 and .292 respectively.

Guilbe played for the Leones de Ponce of the Liga de Béisbol Profesional de Puerto Rico from 1942 to 1950. For the Senadores de San Juan from 1950 to 1953. And for the Cangrejeros de Santurce in the 1953 season, his final season.

He died in Ponce in 2010 at age 86.
