= Redland, Oklahoma =

- Unincorporated community
- Historical panoramic view of Redland

- Location within Oklahoma
- Coordinates: 35°18′17″N 94°37′28″W
- Country: United States
- State: Oklahoma
- County: Sequoyah
- Elevation: 456 ft (139 m)
- Time zone: UTC-6 (Central (CST))
  - Summer (DST): UTC-5 (CDT)
- Area codes: 918 & 539
- GNIS feature ID: 1100780

Redland is an unincorporated community in Sequoyah County, Oklahoma, United States. The community is 7 miles (11 km) southwest of Muldrow.

== History ==
It was named for the area's red soil and had its own post office from May 17, 1883, until June 30, 1937.
