= Luis Pérez (third baseman) =

Professional baseball player

- Third baseman

Negro league baseball debut
- 1948, for the Indianapolis Clowns

Last appearance
- 1948, for the Indianapolis Clowns
- Stats at Baseball Reference

Teams
- Indianapolis Clowns (1948)

Luis Pérez is a former Negro league third baseman who played in the 1940s.

Pérez played for the Indianapolis Clowns in 1948. In 11 recorded games, he posted seven hits and five RBI in 31 plate appearances.
