= Rafael Cabrera (baseball) =

Cuban baseball player

- Outfielder
- Born: November 13, 1924; Guane, Cuba
- Died: June 8, 1990 (aged 65); New York, New York
- Batted: Right Threw: Right

Negro league baseball debut
- 1944, for the Indianapolis–Cincinnati Clowns

Last appearance
- 1948, for the Indianapolis Clowns
- Stats at Baseball Reference

Teams
- Indianapolis–Cincinnati Clowns (1944, 1948)

Rafael Cabrera Gómez (November 13, 1924 – June 8, 1990) was a Cuban outfielder in the Negro leagues in the 1940s.

A native of Guane, Cuba, Cabrera made his Negro league debut in 1944 with the Indianapolis–Cincinnati Clowns, and played with the club again in 1948. He died in New York, New York in 1990 at age 65.
