= Monument to Rafael Cabrera =

Memorial in Puebla, Mexico

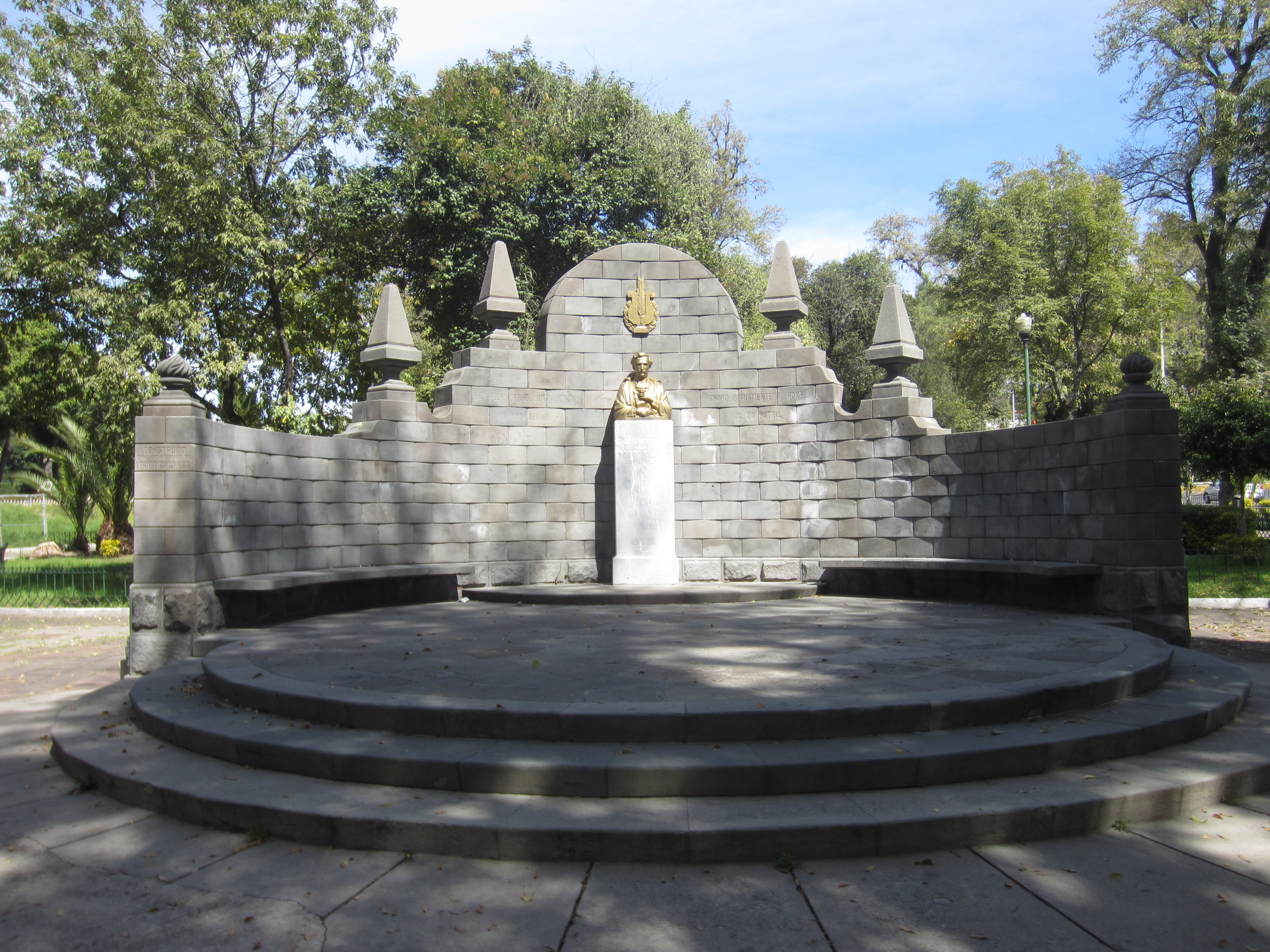
- The monument in 2018
- Location: Puebla, Mexico; 19°2′52″N 98°11′20.1″W

The monument to Rafael Cabrera is installed in the city of Puebla, in the Mexican state of Puebla.

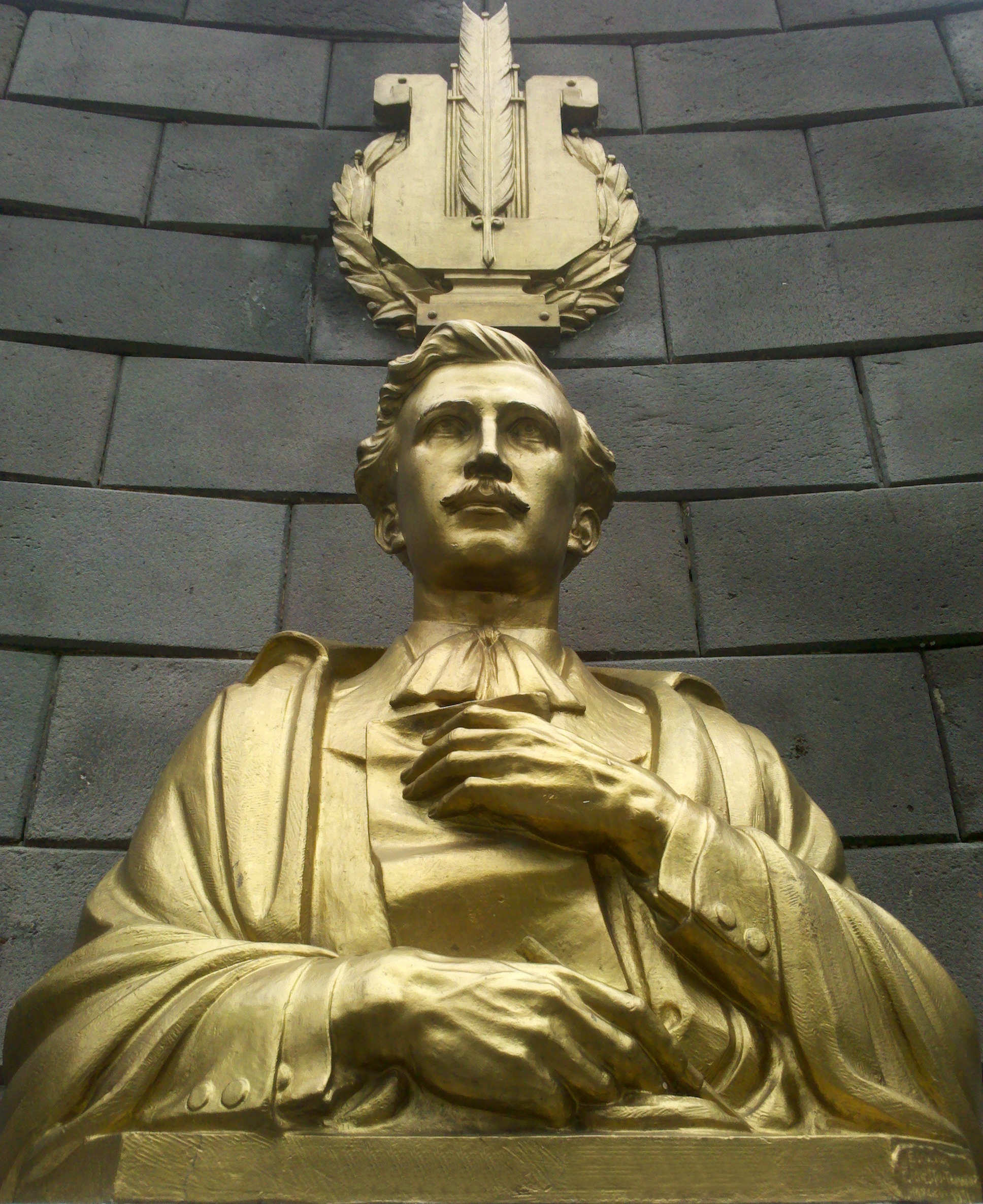
Detail of the bust in 2014
