= Vicente Villafañe =

Professional baseball player

- Third baseman

Negro league baseball debut
- 1947, for the Indianapolis Clowns

Last appearance
- 1947, for the Indianapolis Clowns
- Stats at Baseball Reference

Teams
- Indianapolis Clowns (1947)

Vicente Villafañe is a former Negro league third baseman who played in the 1940s.

Villafañe played for the Indianapolis Clowns in 1947. In eight recorded games, he posted eight hits and two RBI in 29 plate appearances.
