= Luis Pillot =

Puerto Rican baseball player (born 1917)

- Pitcher
- Born: August 22, 1917; Guayama, Puerto Rico
- Died: November 2, 1963 (aged 46); Ponce, Puerto Rico
- Batted: Right Threw: Right

Negro league baseball debut
- 1941, for the New York Black Yankees

Last appearance
- 1946, for the New York Black Yankees

Teams
- New York Black Yankees (1941); Cincinnati Clowns (1943); New York Black Yankees (1946)

Luis Guillermo Pillot Massó (August 22, 1917 – November 2, 1963), nicknamed "Guido", was a Puerto Rican pitcher in the Negro leagues in the 1940s.

A native of Guayama, Puerto Rico, Pillot made his Negro leagues debut in 1941 with the New York Black Yankees, and played for the Cincinnati Clowns in 1943. He served in the United States Navy during World War II, and returned to the New York club for the 1946 season. Pillot died in Ponce, Puerto Rico in 1963 at age 46.
