= Luis Cabrera (baseball) =

Puerto Rican baseball player (born 1919)

- Pitcher
- Born: April 26, 1919; Ponce, Puerto Rico
- Died: September 16, 1977 (aged 58); Trujillo Alto, Puerto Rico
- Batted: Right Threw: Right

Negro league baseball debut
- 1948, for the Indianapolis Clowns

Last appearance
- 1948, for the Indianapolis Clowns

Teams
- Indianapolis Clowns (1948)

Luis Raúl Cabrera Colón (April 26, 1919 – September 16, 1977) was a Puerto Rican baseball pitcher who played in the Negro leagues in the 1940s.

A native of Ponce, Puerto Rico, Cabrera played for the Indianapolis Clowns in 1948. In five recorded appearances on the mound, he posted a 4.09 ERA over 33 innings. Cabrera died in Trujillo Alto, Puerto Rico in 1977 at age 58.
