= Tomás Quiñones =

Puerto Rican baseball player (1920–1967)

- Pitcher
- Born: June 19, 1920; Yauco, Puerto Rico
- Died: March 8, 1967 (aged 46); New York, New York, U.S.
- Batted: Right Threw: Right

Negro league baseball debut
- 1947, for the Indianapolis Clowns

Last appearance
- 1947, for the Indianapolis Clowns

Teams
- Indianapolis Clowns (1947)

Tomás Quiñones (June 19, 1920 – March 8, 1967), nicknamed "Planchardón", was a Puerto Rican pitcher in the Negro leagues and Mexican League in the 1940s.

A native of Yauco, Puerto Rico, Quiñones pitched for the Indianapolis Clowns in 1947. The 1947 Indianapolis Clowns were among the teams added to the major leagues in 2022. He died in New York, New York in 1967 at age 46.
