= Raúl Navarro (baseball) =

Cuban baseball player (born 1921)

- Left fielder / Shortstop / Catcher
- Born: October 6, 1921; Limonar, Cuba
- Died: December 1999

Negro league baseball debut
- 1945, for the Cincinnati Clowns

Last appearance
- 1945, for the Cincinnati Clowns

Teams
- Cincinnati Clowns (1945)

Raúl Navarro (October 6, 1921 – December 1999) was a Cuban professional baseball left fielder, shortstop and catcher in the Negro leagues in 1945 and in the Mexican League in 1944 and from 1946–1953.

A native of Limonar, Cuba, Navarro played for the Cincinnati Clowns in 1945. Navarro died in 1999 at age 78.
