= John Henry McQueen =

American baseball player

- Outfielder
- Born: June 24, 1916; Monticello, Florida
- Died: December 14, 1977 (aged 61); Tampa, Florida
- Batted: Right Threw: Right

Negro league baseball debut
- 1944, for the Indianapolis–Cincinnati Clowns

Last appearance
- 1945, for the New York Black Yankees

Teams
- Indianapolis–Cincinnati Clowns (1944); New York Black Yankees (1945)

John Henry McQueen (June 24, 1916 – December 14, 1977) was an American Negro league outfielder in the 1940s.

A native of Monticello, Florida, McQueen made his Negro leagues debut in 1944 with the Indianapolis–Cincinnati Clowns. The following season, he played for the New York Black Yankees. McQueen died in Tampa, Florida in 1977 at age 61.
