= Juan Guilbe =

Puerto Rican baseball player (born 1914)

- Pitcher
- Born: June 26, 1914; Ponce, Puerto Rico
- Died: April 29, 1994 (aged 79); Ponce, Puerto Rico
- Batted: Right Threw: Right

Negro league baseball debut
- 1940, for the New York Cubans

Last appearance
- 1947, for the Indianapolis Clowns
- Stats at Baseball Reference

Teams
- New York Cubans (1940); Indianapolis Clowns (1947)

Juan Guilbe Colón (June 26, 1914 – April 29, 1994) was a Puerto Rican professional baseball pitcher in the American Negro leagues in the 1940s.

A native of Ponce, Puerto Rico, Guilbe played on the Puerto Rico national baseball team that competed at the 1938 Central American and Caribbean Games. He pitched six innings in one game, with four strikeouts against Cuba; he also appeared as a first baseman in the tournament.

He was the brother of fellow Negro leaguer Felix Guilbe. Older brother Juan pitched in the Negro leagues for the New York Cubans in 1940, and the Indianapolis Clowns in 1947, and was inducted into the Puerto Rican Baseball Hall of Fame in 1992. Guilbe died in Ponce in 1994 at age 79.
