= Coco Ferrer =

Puerto Rican baseball player (born 1915)

- Shortstop
- Born: January 1, 1915; Juana Díaz, Puerto Rico
- Died: August 17, 1963 (aged 48); Ponce, Puerto Rico
- Batted: Right Threw: Right

Negro league baseball debut
- 1946, for the Indianapolis Clowns

Last appearance
- 1951, for the Chicago American Giants
- Stats at Baseball Reference

Teams
- Indianapolis Clowns (1946–1948); Chicago American Giants (1951)

Efigenio Ferrer Cabrera (January 1, 1915 – August 17, 1963), nicknamed "Coco" and "Al", was a Puerto Rican Negro league shortstop who played in the 1940s.

A native of Juana Díaz, Puerto Rico, Ferrer played for the Puerto Rico national baseball team in the 1938 Central American and Caribbean Games. He made his Negro leagues debut in 1946 with the Indianapolis Clowns, and played three seasons for Indianapolis before going on to play for the Chicago American Giants in 1951. Ferrer died in Ponce, Puerto Rico in 1963 at age 48.
