= Reinaldo Drake =

Cuban baseball player and manager (born 1923)

- Center fielder / Manager
- Born: March 15, 1923; Havana, Cuba
- Batted: Left Threw: Left

Negro American League debut
- 1945, for the Cincinnati Clowns

Last appearance
- 1954, for the Indianapolis Clowns

Negro American League statistics
- Batting average: .274
- Home runs: 2
- Runs batted in: 34
- Managerial record: 4–9–1
- Winning %: .308
- Stats at Baseball Reference

Teams
- As player: Cincinnati / Indianapolis Clowns (1945–1948); As manager: Cincinnati / Indianapolis Clowns (1947)

Reinaldo Verdes Drake (born March 15, 1923), sometimes spelled "Dreke", was a Cuban professional baseball Negro league center fielder and manager who played and managed in the 1940s.

A native of Havana, Cuba, Drake made his Negro leagues debut in 1945 with the Cincinnati Clowns. He remained with the club when it moved to Indianapolis the following season, and was one of three player-managers to manage the Clowns in 1947. The 1947 Clowns were 4–9–1 under Drake’s management, with future Hall of Fame shortstop Willie Wells (14–29) and shortstop/third baseman Hoss Walker (17–19) also serving as player-managers during the season. Drake played with the Clowns through 1954, and was selected to the East–West All-Star Game in 1953. Drake later played minor league baseball with the Yakima Braves.
