= Gacho Torres =

Puerto Rican baseball player

- Outfielder
- Born: July 2, 1896; Rio Piedras, Puerto Rico
- Died: December 14, 1963 (aged 67); Cayey, Puerto Rico
- Batted: Left Threw: Left

Negro league baseball debut
- 1926, for the Newark Stars

Last appearance
- 1926, for the Newark Stars
- Stats at Baseball Reference

Teams
- Newark Stars (1926)

José Torres Torres (July 2, 1896 – December 14, 1963), nicknamed Gacho was a Puerto Rican outfielder in the Negro leagues in the 1920s.

A native of Rio Piedras, Puerto Rico, Torres played for the Newark Stars in 1926. In two recorded games, he went hitless in six plate appearances. With the recognition of certain Negro Leagues as major leagues, Torres is the first player born in Puerto Rico to play in the major leagues.

Torres played in the first few seasons of the Puerto Rican Winter League (PRWL) after it was founded in 1938, playing with the Grises ("Grays") de Humacao (1938–1940), the Criollos de Caguas (1940–41), and the Indios de Mayagüez (1941-1943). A fierce competitor, Torres is believed to be the first player to be ejected from a PRWL game on November 13, 1938. Despite playing well into his forties, Torres is credited with 263 at-bats, 64 hits, 30 runs, and a .243 average in his brief professional career on the island.

Torres died in Cayey, Puerto Rico in 1963 at age 67.
