= Indianapolis Clowns =

Former professional baseball team in the Negro American League

- Logo

Information
- League: Independent (c. 1930s–1941); Negro Major League (1942); Negro American League (1943–1955); Independent (1956–1962)
- Location: Indianapolis, Indiana
- Ballpark: Victory Field (1944–1948); Crosley Field (1943–1947)
- Established: c. 1930s
- Disbanded: 1989
- Nicknames: Miami Giants (c. 1930s); Ethiopian Clowns (c. 1930s–1942); Cincinnati Clowns (1943); Cincinnati–Indianapolis Clowns (1944–1947); Indianapolis Clowns (1948–1962)

The Indianapolis Clowns were a professional baseball team in the Negro American League. Tracing their origins back to the 1930s, the Clowns were the last of the Negro league teams to disband, continuing to play exhibition games into the 1980s. They began play as the independent Ethiopian Clowns, joined the Negro American League as the Cincinnati Clowns and, after a couple of years, relocated to Indianapolis. Hank Aaron was a Clown for a short period, and the Clowns were also one of the first professional baseball teams to hire a female player.

== History ==
=== Founding ===
Before becoming the Ethiopian Clowns, there is evidence indicating that the team was formed in Miami, Florida, in 1935 or 1936 by Hunter Campbell and bootlegger Johnny Pierce, and was known as the Miami Giants, and, by 1941, as the Miami Ethiopian Clowns. The team became an independent barnstorming club, shortening its name to the Ethiopian Clowns. Syd Pollock was instrumental in promoting and popularizing the Clowns and developed them into a nationally known combination of show business and baseball that earned them the designation as the Harlem Globetrotters of baseball.

In 1943, the team was relocated to Cincinnati, where they became the Cincinnati Clowns. That same year they joined the Negro American League, beginning a 12-year membership in the circuit before withdrawing following the 1954 season. The team operated between Cincinnati and Indianapolis in 1944 and 1945 before officially moving to Indianapolis in 1946, playing as the Indianapolis Clowns for the rest of their existence.

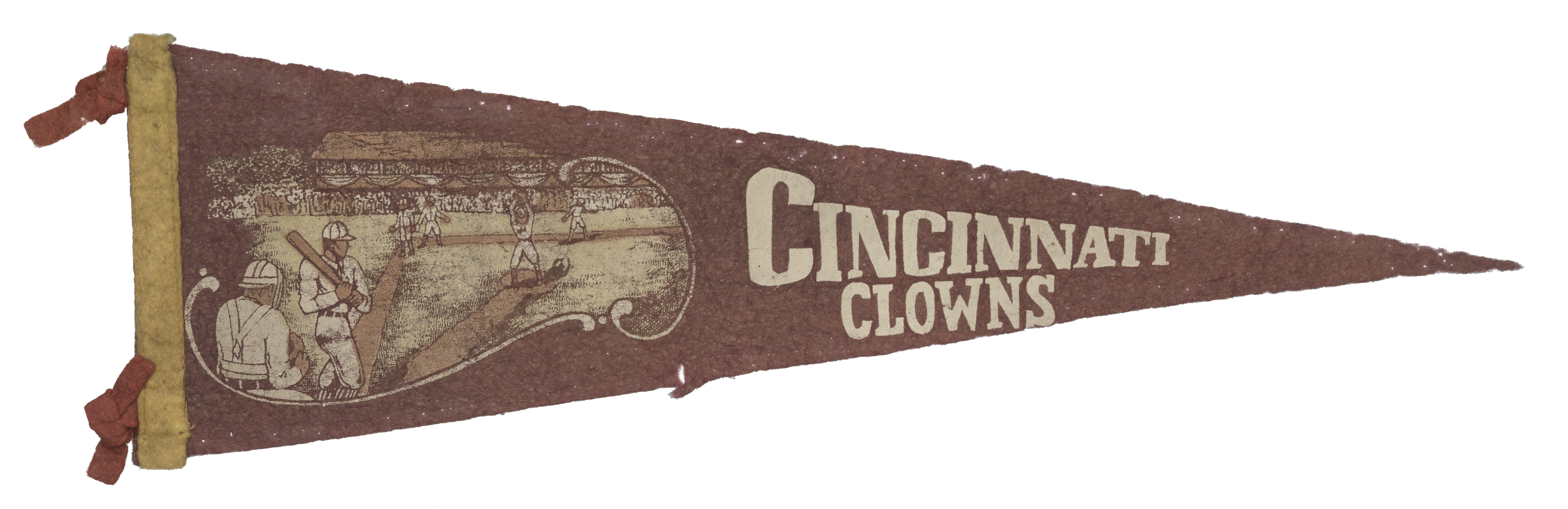
Cincinnati Clowns Pennant

The team won the league championship in 1951, 1952, and 1954.

=== Barnstorming ===
While still fielding a legitimate team, the Clowns also toured with several members known for comic acts — sort of a baseball version of the Harlem Globetrotters, including Joe "Prince" Henry. As the Negro leagues declined in the late 1940s after the integration of Major League Baseball, the Clowns continued operations on barnstorming tours into the 1960s. The team relocated from Indianapolis to Offermann Stadium in Buffalo, New York, in 1951, while retaining the Indianapolis Clowns name. The Clowns left Buffalo after the 1955 season.

By 1967 the Indianapolis Clowns were the last Negro league team still playing. The Clowns continued to play exhibition games into the 1980s, but as a humorous sideshow rather than a competitive sport. After many years of operation as a barnstorming team, the Clowns finally disbanded in 1989.

== Hank Aaron and other notable players ==
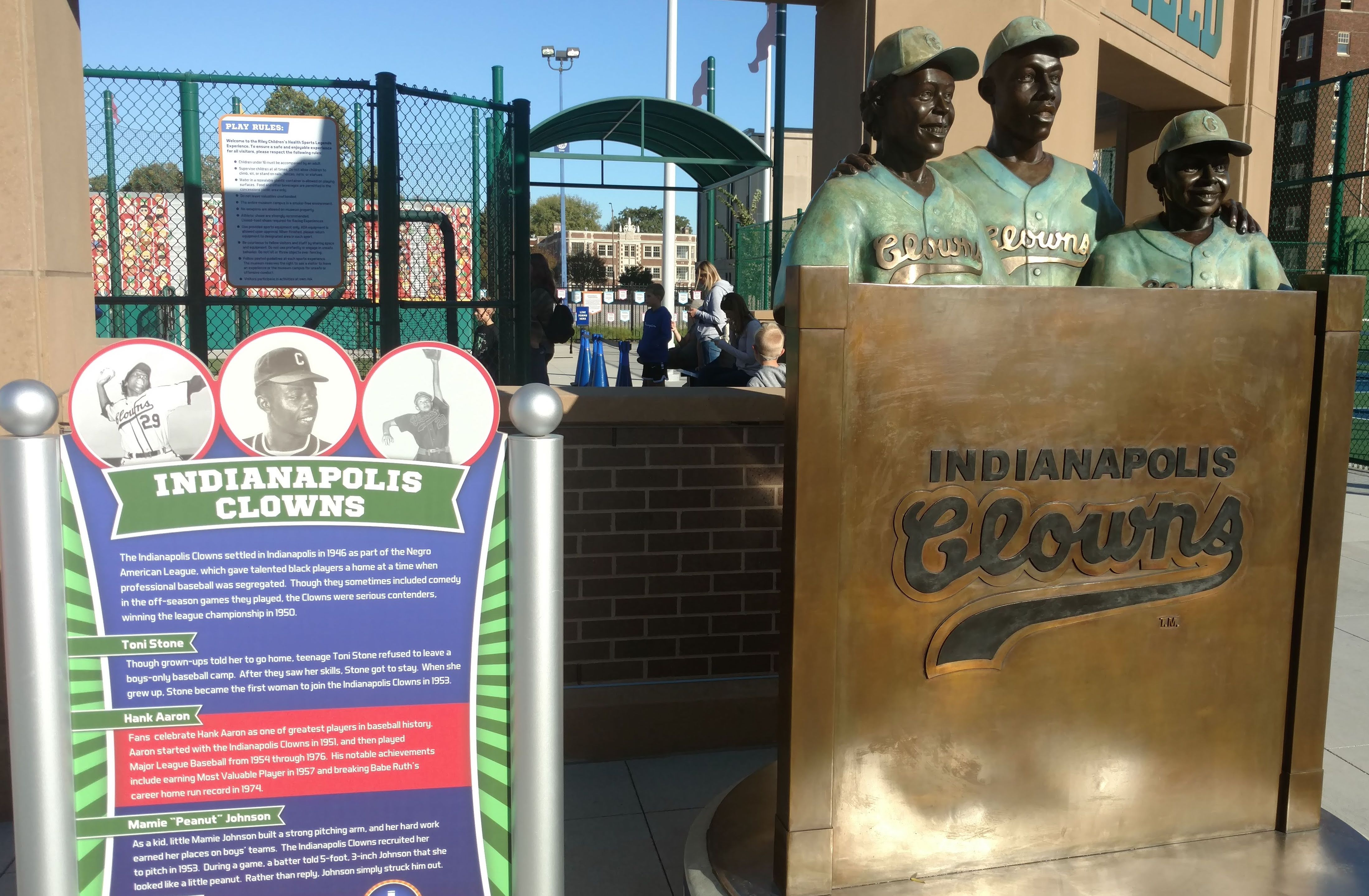
Statues of Toni Stone, Hank Aaron, and Mamie Johnson in the Riley Children's Health Sports Legends Experience at the Indianapolis Children's Museum.

By 1952, Syd Pollock signed Hank Aaron to his first professional contract, at $200 a month. Aaron played about three months as the Clowns' shortstop and cleanup hitter before being acquired by the Boston Braves organization for $10,000.

The Clowns fielded such stars as Buster Haywood, Hubert "Big Daddy" Wooten, DeWitt "Woody" Smallwood, showman and Harlem Globetrotter star "Goose" Tatum, and future Major Leaguers John Wyatt (Kansas City Athletics), Paul Casanova (Washington Senators), Hal King (Atlanta Braves), and Choo-Choo Coleman (New York Mets).

=== Female players ===
The Clowns were the first professional baseball team to hire a female player to a long-term contract that was not voided soon after. In an effort to replace Hank Aaron, who had left the team the previous year, the Clowns hired Toni Stone to play second base with the team in 1953, in which she batted .243. The following year the Clowns sold her contract to the Kansas City Monarchs. They hired two women replacements: Pitcher Mamie "Peanut" Johnson, who would go on to record a record of 33–8 while batting between .262 and .284 on the team, and second baseman Connie Morgan. Women also served as umpires for the team; notably, former Chicago model Nancy Miller, was the first female umpire in pro ball.

== Legacy ==
The 1976 movie The Bingo Long Traveling All-Stars & Motor Kings, starring James Earl Jones, Billy Dee Williams, and Richard Pryor, is loosely based on the barnstorming of the Indianapolis Clowns.

In October 2025, the Banana Ball Championship League, a professional barnstorming league, announced the revival of the same name and identity as an expansion team; the revival was done in partnership with the Negro Leagues Baseball Museum.

== Sources ==
- The Biographical Encyclopedia of the Negro Baseball Leagues – James A. Riley. Publisher: Chelsea House, 1996. Format: Paperback, 124pp. Language: English. ISBN 0-7910-2592-6
