= Cleveland Buckeyes all-time roster =

The following is the list of players on the Cleveland Buckeyes all-time roster. These are Cleveland Buckeyes players who appeared in at least one game for the Buckeyes while they were based either in Cleveland from 1942 to 1948 and 1950, Cincinnati in 1942, or Louisville in 1949.

On-going research continuously discovers unreported or misreported games (and the affected players), while some games and players may be lost forever. Therefore, some Negro league players' affiliations will likely remain incomplete and possibly disputed.

‡ Bold player inducted as a member of the National Baseball Hall of Fame and Museum.

== A–D ==
Player	Year(s)	Position(s)	Ref
Hosea Allen	1946	P	
Buddy Armour	1944–1946	OF	
Earl Ashby	1945	C	
Joe Atkins	1947	3B	
Otha Bailey	1950	C	
Cannonball Berry	1948	OF	
Junius Bibbs	1944	2B	
Alonzo Boone	1942–1944, 1946–1947	P	
Lefty Boone	1942	P	
Doc Bracken	1946–1947	P	
Gene Bremer	1942–1948	P	
Chet Brewer	1942–1943, 1946–1948	P	
George Britt	1942–1944	C	
George Brown	1942	OF	
John Brown	1944–1948	P	
Walter Burch	1942, 1944, 1946	C / P	
Joe Caffie	1950	OF	
Avelino Cañizares	1945	SS	
Frank Carswell	1944–1946, 1948	P	
Eli Chism	1946	OF	
Thad Christopher	1942–1943	OF	
Webbo Clarke	1946–1948	P	
Duke Cleveland	1942–1943	OF	
James Cooper	1942	P	
Johnnie Cowan	1942, 1944–1947	2B	
Walter Crosby	1944	C	
Jimmie Crutchfield	1944	OF	
Lloyd Davenport	1942, 1944–1945	OF	
Rosey Davis	1945	P	
Ross Davis	1943, 1947	P	

== E–L ==
Player	Year(s)	Position(s)	Ref
Frank Evans	1949–1950	OF	
Rayford Finch	1945	P	
Frank Fleming	1946	P	
Willie Grace	1942–1950	OF	
Joe Greene	1948	C	
Wiley Griggs	1950	IF	
Adolphus Grimes	1943	OF	
Nap Gulley	1943	P	
Lovell Harden	1943–1945	P	
Sonny Harris	1942	OF	
Tommy Harris	1946–1948	C	
Billy Horne	1942–1946	SS / 2B	
Willie Hubert	1942, 1946	P	
Johnny Hundley	1943	OF	
Tice James	1942	SS	
Bill Jefferson	1942–1946	P	
Jeff Jefferson	1944–1945, 1947–1948	P	
Sam Jethroe	1942–1948	OF	
John Wesley Johnson Jr.	1943	OF	
Sam Jones	1947–1948	P	
León Kellman	1946–1949	3B	
Wilbert King	1944	SS	
Eddie Klep	1946	P	

== L–R ==
Player	Year(s)	Position(s)	Ref
Phelbert Lawson	1945	P	
Earnest Long	1948–1950	P	
John Lyles	1942–1943	SS / 3B	
Nathaniel McClinic	1946–1948	OF	
George Minor	1946–1948	OF	
Clyde Nelson	1947–1948	OF / 3B	
Jim Oliver	1946	SS	
Shirley Petway	1944	C	
Al Pinkston	1948	PH	
Hank Presswood	1948–1950	SS / 3B	
Marvin Price	1950		
George Provens	1945	3B	
Ted Radcliffe	1949		
Chico Renfroe	1948–1949		
Bill Reynolds	1948	2B	
Marshall Riddle	1942–1943	2B	

== S–Z ==
Player	Year(s)	Position(s)	Ref
Sam Segraves	1942	OF	
Al Smith	1946–1948	SS / OF	
Gene Smith	1942	3B	
Gene Smith	1947–1950	P	
Quincy Smith	1943	OF	
Theolic Smith	1943	OF	
Raymond Taylor	1942–1943	C	
Ted Toles Jr.	1947		
Quincy Trouppe	1945–1947	C	
Henry Turner	1943	C	
Eugene Tyler	1942	OF	
Archie Ware	1942–1948	1B	
Clyde Williams	1947–1950	P	
Jesse F. Williams	1944–1945, 1947	C	
Jesse Williams	1947	OF	
Marvin Williams	1950	IF	
Emmett Wilson	1942	OF	
Parnell Woods	1942–1945	3B	
Sam Woods	1946	P	
Ralph Wyatt	1946	SS	
