= Deaths in December 1993 =

The following is a list of notable deaths in December 1993.

Entries for each day are listed alphabetically by surname. A typical entry lists information in the following sequence:

- Name, age, country of citizenship at birth, subsequent country of citizenship (if applicable), reason for notability, cause of death (if known), and reference.

== December 1993 ==
=== 1 ===
- Wilfredo Coto, 76, Cuban Olympic sports shooter (1948).
- Lynette Davies, 45, Welsh actress, suicide.
- Edwin Flavell, 95, British Army officer.
- Ray Gillen, 34, American rock singer-songwriter, AIDS-related complications.
- Sir Ivor Hele, 81, Australian artist.
- Scott Kolk, 88, American actor.
- Mary Lobel, 93, British historian.
- Giulio Marchetti, 82, Italian and actor and television presenter, internal hemorrhage.
- Francisco Martínez, 83, Mexican Olympic basketball player (1936).
- Isaac Moraes, 79, Brazilian Olympic swimmer (1932, 1936).

=== 2 ===
- Ali Benfadah, 58, Algerian football player and manager.
- Paal Brekke, 70, Norwegian lyricist, novelist, and literary critic.
- Evelyn Dearman, 85, English tennis player.
- Harry Julius Emeléus, 90, English inorganic chemist.
- Pablo Escobar, 44, Colombian drug lord and narcoterrorist, shot.
- Walter Frank Foy, 84, Canadian politician, member of the House of Commons of Canada (1962-1968).
- John Kershaw, 62, British screenwriter and script editor.
- Augie Vander Meulen, 84, American basketball player.
- Tom Monroe, 74, American actor.
- Leo Paquin, 83, American football player.

=== 3 ===
- Frank Anthony, 85, Indian politician and Anglo-Indian community leader.
- Harry Barnes, 78, American baseball player.
- Henricus Cockuyt, 90, Belgian Olympic sprinter (1924).
- George P. Hammond, 97, American professor of Latin American studies.
- Witold Majchrzycki, 84, Polish Olympic boxer (1928).
- Lea Mek, 18, Cambodian-American gang member, murdered in gang shooting.
- Steve Paproski, 65, Canadian politician and football player.
- Lewis Thomas, 80, American science writer.

=== 4 ===
- Victor Gunnarsson, 40, Swedish right-wing activist, homicide.
- Marcel Jean, 92, French painter, writer, and sculptor.
- Margaret Landon, 90, American writer and missionary.
- Hugh Moore, 64, British City of London Police commander, heart failure.
- Jusuf Prazina, 31, Bosnian gangster and paramilitary warlord during the Bosnian War, homicide.
- George Sergienko, 75, American football player.
- Frank Sturgis, 68, American CIA operative and one of the Watergate burglars, lung cancer.
- Roy Vernon, 56, Welsh football player.
- Frank Zappa, 52, American musician, singer-songwriter and record producer, prostate cancer.

=== 5 ===
- Mike Dowdle, 55, American gridiron football player (Dallas Cowboys, San Francisco 49ers).
- Yevgeny Gabrilovich, 94, Soviet and Russian writer, playwright and screenwriter.
- Doug Hopkins, 32, American musician and songwriter, suicide by gunshot.
- Les Jones, 88, Australian rules footballer.
- Rita Macedo, 68, Mexican actress and dressmaker, suicide by gunshot.
- Vince Mazza, 68, Canadian football player.
- Robert Ochsenfeld, 92, German physicist.
- Walter Reisp, 83, Austrian Olympic handball player (1936).
- Alexandre Trauner, 87, Hungarian film production designer.

=== 6 ===
- Don Ameche, 85, American actor (Cocoon, Trading Places, Heaven Can Wait), Oscar winner (1986), prostate cancer.
- Bryson Graham, 41, English rock drummer.
- Anna Hřebřinová, 85, Czechoslovak Olympic gymnast (1936).
- Sergi Jikia, 95, Georgian historian and orientalist.
- Hendrik Ooms, 77, Dutch Olympic cyclist (1936).
- Ray Thomas, 83, American baseball player (Brooklyn Dodgers).
- Paul-Louis Weiller, 100, French industrialist and philanthropist.

=== 7 ===
- Nicky Crane, 35, English neo-Nazi activist, AIDS-related bronchopneumonia.
- Abidin Dino, 80, Turkish artist and painter, cancer.
- Félix Houphouët-Boigny, 88, President of Ivory Coast, cancer.
- Blaže Koneski, 71, Macedonian poet, writer, and linguistic scholar.
- Sándor Németh, 68, Hungarian swimmer and Olympian (1948).
- Wolfgang Paul, 80, German physicist and Nobel Prize laureate.
- Håkon Solem, 85, Norwegian Olympic sailor (1948).
- Robert Taft, Jr., 76, American politician.
- Anthony J. Travia, 82, American district judge (United States District Court for the Eastern District of New York).

=== 8 ===
- Bob Barnes, 91, American baseball player (Chicago White Sox).
- Carl Damm, 66, German politician and member of the Bundestag.
- Yevgeny Minayev, 60, Russian Olympic weightlifter (1956, 1960), starvation and hypothermia.
- Carlotta Monti, 86, American film actress.
- Cole Palen, 67, American aviator.
- Philippe Pradayrol, 27, French Olympic judoka (1992), traffic collision.
- Mieczysław Wilczewski, 61, Polish cyclist and Olympian (1960).

=== 9 ===
- Salvatore Allegra, 95, Italian composer.
- Danny Blanchflower, 67, Northern Irish football player, Alzheimer's disease.
- Glen Brydson, 83, Canadian ice hockey player.
- Mohammad-Reza Golpaygani, 94, Iranian Grand Ayatollah and Shia islam scholar.
- Herbert Grevenius, 92, Swedish screenwriter.
- Matt Guokas, 78, American basketball player (Philadelphia Warriors), and broadcaster.
- Carter Jefferson, 48, American jazz tenor saxophonist.
- Alexander Koblencs, 77, Latvian chess master and writer.
- John Wisdom, 89, British philosopher.

=== 10 ===
- Maroun Bagdadi, 43, Lebanese film director, fall.
- Jerzy Juskowiak, 54, Polish Olympic sprinter (1960).
- Fernand Mithouard, 84, French cyclist.
- Alice Tully, 91, American opera singer, music promoter, and philanthropist, influenza.
- Miljan Zeković, 68, Montenegrin and Yugoslav football player and manager.
- Alan E. Zimmer, 64, American neuroradiologist, stroke.

=== 11 ===
- James Chapman, 61, Australian rules footballer.
- Ku Cheng-kang, 91, Chinese politician and scholar.
- Francisco Flores del Campo, 86, Chilean composer, instrumentalist and actor, cardiovascular disease.
- Raymond D. Gary, 85, American businessman and politician.
- Bohdan Likszo, 53, Polish basketball player and Olympian (1964, 1968).
- Paul Mebus, 73, German football player.
- Bill Mumm, 71, New Zealand rugby union player and politician.
- Steve Nelson, 90, Croatian-American political activist.
- Karl-Theodor Molinari, 78, German Army and Bundeswehr officer and politician.
- Pierre Sarr N'Jie, 84, Gambian lawyer and politician.
- Phil Perlo, 58, American gridiron football player (Houston Oilers).
- Elvira Popescu, 99, Romanian-French actress and theatre director.
- Sam Stayman, 84, American bridge player and writer.

=== 12 ===
- József Antall, 61, Hungarian teacher, historian, and politician, prime minister (1990-1993), cancer.
- Ned Barry, 88, New Zealand rugby union player and police officer.
- Marian Constance Blackton, 92, American screenwriter and actress.
- Fritz Bock, 82, Austrian politician.
- Joan Cross, 93, English soprano.
- Alexandru Drăghici, 80, Romanian communist activist and politician.
- Don Earle, 64, American ice hockey announcer.
- Bob Taylor, 89, American ice hockey player (Boston Bruins).

=== 13 ===
- Ken Anderson, 84, American art director (Snow White and the Seven Dwarfs, The Sword in the Stone) and screenwriter (Cinderella), stroke.
- Larry Cameron, 41, American gridiron football player and professional wrestler, heart attack in ring during match.
- Avelino Cañizares, 74, Cuban baseball player.
- Vanessa Duriès, 21, French novelist, traffic collision.
- Joy Laurey, 50, French novelist, traffic collision.
- Tommy Sexton, 36, Canadian comedian, AIDS-related complications.
- Billy Shantz, 66, American baseball player (Philadelphia/Kansas City Athletics, New York Yankees), and manager.
- Gaziza Zhubanova, 66, Kazakh composer.

=== 14 ===
- Jeff Alm, 25, American gridiron football player (Houston Oilers), suicide.
- Shirley J. Dreiss, 44, American hydrologist and hydrogeologist, traffic collision.
- Frank Fuller, 64, American gridiron football player (Los Angeles Rams, Chicago/St. Louis Cardinals Philadelphia Eagles).
- Jennifer Howard, 68, American actress, lung cancer.
- Francis Jones, 85, Welsh historian and officer of arms.
- Aristides Azevedo Pacheco Leão, 79, Brazilian neurophysiologist and researcher, respiratory failure.
- Myrna Loy, 88, American actress (The Thin Man, The Best Years of Our Lives, Cheaper by the Dozen), lung cancer.
- Silvina Ocampo, 90, Argentine short story writer, poet, and artist.
- Jerry Scala, 69, American baseball player (Chicago White Sox).
- Billy Stone, 92, Australian rules footballer.

=== 15 ===
- Tom Bedecki, 64, Canadian ice hockey player and coach.
- Rizzardo Brenioli, 63, Italian racing cyclist.
- Raúl Esnal, 37, Uruguayan football player, homicide.
- Jack Ferguson, 71, Australian Olympic water polo player (1948).
- Penaia Ganilau, 75, First President of Fiji, leukemia.
- William Dale Phillips, 68, American physical chemist and academic.
- Rich Snyder, 41, American businessman, president of In-N-Out Burger (since 1976), plane crash.
- Marcel Vandernotte, 84, French rower and Olympian (1932, 1936).

=== 16 ===
- Charizma, 20, American MC, shot.
- Fedele Gentile, 85, Italian film actor.
- Moses Gunn, 64, American actor (Shaft, Little House on the Prairie, Heartbreak Ridge), asthma.
- Riley Hill, 79, American actor.
- Jed Johnson, Jr., 53, American politician, member of the United States House of Representatives (1965-1967).
- Frank Little, 57, American Olympic sports shooter (1964).
- Charles Moore, 68, American architect and writer.
- Kakuei Tanaka, 75, Japanese politician, pneumonia.

=== 17 ===
- Patrick Crowley, 87, Irish politician and trade union official.
- Bobby Davidson, 65, Scottish football referee.
- Hilding Hagberg, 94, Swedish communist politician.
- Mirza Ibrahimov, 82, Soviet and Azerbaijani writer, playwright, and public figure.
- Len Julians, 60, English football player.
- Janet Margolin, 50, American actress, ovarian cancer.

=== 18 ===
- Bernard Ayandho, 63, Central African politician and diplomat.
- Joseph H. Ball, 88, American journalist and politician, member of the United States Senate (1940-1942, 1943-1949).
- Georges Bégué, 82, French engineer and SOE agent during World War II.
- Marion Barbara "Joe" Carstairs, 93, British-American powerboat racer.
- Gheorghe Cozorici, 60, Romanian actor.
- Helm Glöckler, 84, German amateur racing driver.
- Steve James, 41, American actor and stunt performer, cancer.
- Tony Kappen, 74, American basketball player (Boston Celtics).
- Buster Larsen, 73, Danish actor.
- Carl Malling, 88, Danish Olympic field hockey player (1928, 1936).
- Guy Sabrou, 85, French architect.
- Natalya Sats, 90, Russian stage director.
- Bernhard Sälzer, 53, German politician and member of the European Parliament, traffic collision.
- Ferdinando Smerghetto, 66, Italian Olympic rower (1952).
- Sam Wanamaker, 74, American actor and director, prostate cancer.

=== 19 ===
- Wallace F. Bennett, 95, American businessman and politician, member of the United States Senate (1951-1974).
- Michael Clarke, 47, American drummer (The Byrds), liver failure.
- Kurt Frey, 80, German Olympic sailor (1936).
- Iichirō Hatoyama, 75, Japanese politician.
- Inez James, 74, American film score composer.
- Owain Owain, 64, Welsh novelist, short-story writer and poet.
- Hans Rohrbach, 90, German mathematician and cryptanalyst during World War II.
- Bob Syme, 69, Australian rules footballer.

=== 20 ===
- Marlin Carter, 80, American baseball player.
- Gussie Nell Davis, 87, American educator and founder of the Kilgore College Rangerettes.
- Hubert Deltour, 82, Belgian racing cyclist.
- W. Edwards Deming, 93, American engineer, statistician, author, and lecturer.
- Nazife Güran, 72, Turkish composer.
- Charles Herman Helmsing, 85, American prelate of the Roman Catholic Church.
- Hulusi Kentmen, 81, Turkish actor, kidney failure.
- Felix Mackiewicz, 76, American baseball player (Philadelphia Athletics, Cleveland Indians, Washington Senators).
- Jesús Picó, 58, Chilean footballer.
- Linar Salimullin, 61, Soviet Olympic wrestler (1956).

=== 21 ===
- Sir Philip Christison, 4th Baronet, 100, British Army officer.
- Guy des Cars, 82, French novelist.
- Frederick J. Harlfinger II, 80, American Navy officer.
- Vilhelm Johansen, 95, Danish Olympic sports shooter (1936).
- Ernie Kish, 75, American baseball player (Philadelphia Athletics).
- Ivan Kozlovskyi, 93, Soviet and Russian lyric tenor.
- Zack Mosley, 87, American cartoonist (The Adventures of Smilin' Jack).
- Pekka Niemi, 84, Finnish cross-country skier and Olympian (1936).
- Margarita Nikolaeva, 58, Soviet gymnast and Olympian (1960).
- Ham Schulte, 81, American baseball player (Philadelphia Phillies).

=== 22 ===
- Mario Amendola, 83, Italian screenwriter, film director and dramatist, diabetes.
- Sylvia Bataille, 85, French actress, heart attack.
- Oto Bihalji-Merin, 89, Yugoslav and Serbian writer, painter and art critic.
- Marion Burns, 86, American film actress.
- Don DeFore, 80, American actor, heart attack.
- Ferenc Kropacsek, 94, Hungarian Olympic footballer (1924).
- Alexander Mackendrick, 81, American-Scottish film director, pneumonia.
- Max Tarnogrocki, 89, German middle-distance runner (1928).
- Salah Zulfikar, 67, Egyptian actor and film producer.

=== 23 ===
- Sveinbjörn Beinteinsson, 69, Icelandic religious leader and neopaganist, heart attack.
- Gertrude Blom, 92, Swiss journalist, social anthropologist, and documentary photographer.
- Lauchlin Currie, 91, American economist.
- James Ellison, 83, American film actor, fall.
- Michael Faber, 54, German footballer.
- Luigi Giuliano, 63, Italian football player.
- Jean Maréchal, 83, French racing cyclist.
- Chucho Navarro, 80, Mexican singer.
- Marcello Neri, 91, Italian Olympic cyclist (1928).

=== 24 ===
- Pierre Victor Auger, 94, French physicist.
- Yen Chia-kan, 88, President of the Republic of China.
- Anita Dorris, 90, German actress of the silent era.
- Ralph Downes, 89, English organist, organ designer, and music director.
- Milena Foltýnová-Gschiessl, 43, Czech-Austrian Olympic handball player (1980, 1984).
- Ivano Fontana, 67, Italian Olympic boxer (1948).
- Ralph Goullet, 89, Australian rules footballer.
- Andrzej Nadolski, 72, Polish historian, archaeologist, and professor.
- Dorothea Parker, 65, New Zealand sprinter, cancer.
- Norman Vincent Peale, 95, American writer and minister, stroke.
- J. Wayne Reitz, 84, American agricultural economist and university president.
- Vladimir Šimunić, 74, Croatian football player and manager.

=== 25 ===
- Blandine Ebinger, 94, German cabaret singer and actress.
- Princess Marie Adelheid of Lippe-Biesterfeld, 98, German princess, socialite, and author.
- Ama Naidoo, 85, South African anti-apartheid activist, heart failure.
- Jeff Phillips, 30, American professional skateboarder, suicide by gunshot.
- Ann Ronell, 86, American composer and lyricist.
- Azat Sherents, 80, Soviet and Armenian actor.
- Marian Suski, 88, Polish Olympic fencer (1932, 1936).
- Nikolai Timkov, 81, Soviet and Russian painter.

=== 26 ===
- Dave Beck, 99, American labor leader.
- Ray Bray, 76, American football player (Chicago Bears, Green Bay Packers).
- Lilian Edirisinghe, 71, Sri Lankan actress.
- René Fonjallaz, 85-86, Swiss bobsledder and Olympian (1928).
- Hans Liska, 76, Austrian-born German artist.
- Jeff Morrow, 86, American actor.
- Carlos Muñoz, 29, Ecuadorian football player, traffic collision.
- Patrick W. Ryan, Irish politician.
- Erkki Savolainen, 76, Finnish Olympic boxer (1936).

=== 27 ===
- Michael Callen, 38, American musician, author, and AIDS activist, AIDS-related complications.
- Ivo Ghezze, 52, Italian Olympic ice hockey player (1964).
- Runar Holmberg, 70, Finnish Olympic sprinter (1948).
- Feliks Kibbermann, 91, Estonian chess master and philologist.
- Nina Lugovskaya, 75, Soviet painter and theatre designer.
- Evald Mikson, 82, Estonian football player.
- André Pilette, 75, Belgian racecar driver.
- Royce H. Savage, 89, American district judge (United States District Court for the Northern District of Oklahoma).
- Paavo Susitaival, 97, Finnish politician and military officer.

=== 28 ===
- William Austin, 90, Canadian-American film editor.
- Alfonso Balcázar, 67, Spanish screenwriter, film director and producer.
- Howard Caine, 67, American actor (Hogan's Heroes, 1776, Judgment at Nuremberg), heart attack.
- Augie Galan, 81, American baseball player, manager and coach.
- John Kemp, 53, New Zealand footballer and cricketer.
- Gilles Lamontagne, 69, Canadian baritone
- Jennifer Lash, 55, English novelist and painter, breast cancer.
- William L. Shirer, 89, American journalist and war correspondent.

=== 29 ===
- Axel Corti, 60, Austrian screenwriter, film director and radio host.
- Yvonne Desportes, 86, French composer, writer, and music educator.
- Karl Endres, 82, German Olympic basketball player (1936).
- Lohengrin Filipello, 75, Swiss television presenter.
- Hans Houtzager, 83, Dutch Olympic hammer thrower (1936, 1948).
- Shirley Jameson, 75, American baseball player.
- Marie Kean, 75, Irish actress (Barry Lyndon, Ryan's Daughter, The Fighting Prince of Donegal).
- Marshall Meyer, 63, American conservative rabbi, cancer.
- Frunzik Mkrtchyan, 63, Armenian stage and film actor, cancer.

=== 30 ===
- Tom Alston, 67, American baseball player (St. Louis Cardinals).
- Mack David, 81, American lyricist and songwriter.
- Dick Donald, 82, Scottish football player and administrator.
- David Helliwell, 58, Canadian Olympic rower (1956).
- Rita Klímová, 62, Czech economist and politician, leukemia.
- Irving Paul Lazar, 86, American talent agent and businessman.
- Giuseppe Occhialini, 86, Italian physicist.
- George Stone, 47, American basketball player (Los Angeles/Utah Stars, Carolina Cougars), heart attack.
- İhsan Sabri Çağlayangil, 85, Turkish politician.

=== 31 ===
- Henry A. Byroade, 80, American diplomat.
- Bill Cowley, 81, Canadian Hall of Fame ice hockey player (St. Louis Eagles, Boston Bruins).
- Arthur Dreifuss, 85, German-American film director.
- Mikhail Dudin, 77, Soviet and Russian poet and writer.
- Zviad Gamsakhurdia, 54, Soviet and Georgian politician, dissident, and writer, shot.
- Alexander Girard, 86, American architect and designer.
- Jørgen Iversen, 75, Danish footballer.
- Bob Johnson, 73, American actor.
- Eric "Bingy Bunny" Lamont, 38, Jamaican guitarist and singer, prostate cancer.
- Guy Lefrant, 70, French equestrian and Olympian (1952, 1960, 1964).
- Betty McDowall, 69, Australian actress.
- Lauriston Sharp, 86, American anthropologist and academic.
- Samuel Steward, 84, American writer, professor, tattoo artist and pornographer.
- Brandon Teena, 21, American trans man and murder victim, shot.
- Thomas Watson, 79, American businessman, politician, and philanthropist, stroke.
