= Jesse Williams =

Jesse Williams may refer to:

- Jesse Williams (actor) (born 1981), American television actor
- Jesse Williams (American football) (born 1990), American football defensive tackle
- Jesse Williams (high jumper) (born 1983), American high jumper
- Jesse Williams (Canadian football) (1940–2015), Canadian football player
- Jesse Williams (footballer, born 1903) (1903–1972), Welsh international footballer
- Jesse Williams (footballer, born 2001), Trinidadian international footballer
- Jesse Williams (shortstop) (1913–1990), American Negro league baseball player
- Jesse Williams (outfielder) (1923–1996), American Negro league baseball player
- Jesse F. Williams, American Negro league baseball player
- Jesse Lynch Williams (1871–1929), author and dramatist
- Jesse M. Williams (1831–1864), American Civil War soldier
- Jesse West (Jesse Williams, born 1967), producer

== See also ==
- Jessie Williams (disambiguation)
- Jessica Williams (disambiguation)
