= Gene Bremer =

American baseball player (1916–1971)

- Pitcher
- Born: July 18, 1916; New Orleans, Louisiana, U.S.
- Died: June 19, 1971 (aged 54); Cleveland, Ohio, U.S.
- Batted: Right Threw: Right

Major League debut
- 1937, for the Cincinnati Tigers

Last appearance
- 1948, for the Cleveland Buckeyes

MLB statistics
- Win–loss record: 33–22
- Earned run average: 3.05
- Strikeouts: 194
- Stats at Baseball Reference

Teams
- Minor Leagues/Independent/Other: New Orleans Crescent Stars (1932-1934); Shreveport Giants (1935); Cincinnati Tigers (1936); Broadview Buffaloes (1936-1937); Carta Blanca (1939); Rochester Royals (1949); New Orleans Creoles (1949); Negro Major Leagues: Cincinnati Tigers (1937); Kansas City Monarchs (1938); Memphis Red Sox (1938–1940); Cincinnati/Cleveland Buckeyes (1942); Cleveland Buckeyes (1943–1948)

Career highlights and awards
- 4× All-Star (1940, 1942, 1944, 1945); Negro World Series champion (1945); Negro American League ERA leader (1937)

Eugene Joseph Bremer (Bremmer) (July 18, 1916 – June 19, 1971) was an American professional baseball pitcher in Negro league baseball. He played between 1932 and 1949.

== Pitching style ==
The 5' 8" righthander pitched exclusively without a windup and utilized an overhand curve.

== Playing career ==
=== Early days ===
Bremer began his career in 1932 with his hometown New Orleans Crescent Stars. In 1935, he joined Winfield Welch's independent Shreveport Giants.

=== Cincinnati Tigers ===
In 1936, Bremer joined the Cincinnati Tigers, posting a 25-12 record. The Tigers became charter members of the Negro American League in 1937 with Bremer posting a 5-1 record in league play.

=== Broadview Buffaloes ===
Aside from his time with the Tigers in 1936 and 1937, Bremer was also a member of the Broadview Buffaloes, an integrated team in the Canadian Southern Saskatchewan League. The Buffaloes are viewed by many historians as one of the first integrated teams in all of Canada.

=== Memphis Red Sox ===
When the Tigers dissolved prior to the 1938 season, Bremer followed Tigers manager Ted Radcliffe to the Memphis Red Sox. The Red Sox would win the 1938 Negro American League first half pennant, then the league pennant over the Atlanta Black Crackers. In 1940, he was named as the West team's starting pitcher in the annual East-West All-Star Game. During the game, he suffered control problems, walking five batters and giving up two runs in the loss. In his three years in Memphis, Bremer logged a 2-13 record in league play with a 3.72 ERA.

=== Kansas City Monarchs ===
Bremer joined the Kansas City Monarchs late in the 1938 season, making three appearances in league play with a 1-0 record before returning to Memphis the following season.

=== Monterrey Industriales ===
Bremer briefly jumped South of the border and joined the Monterrey Industriales of the Mexican League in 1939, logging a 1-2 record and 3.12 ERA in seven games before returning to Memphis in 1940.

=== Brief Retirement ===
Bremer briefly retired and did not play in the 1941 season.

=== Cincinnati/Cleveland Buckeyes ===
==== 1942 ====
In 1942, Bremer joined former Tigers teammates Bill Jefferson, Sonny Harris, and Ray Robinson on the expansion Cincinnati Buckeyes of the Negro American League. Posting a 5-1 record with a 2.73 ERA in league play, Bremer made the West All-Star team for the second time in his career. Two All-Star games were played in 1942, with Bremer earning the starting nod in the second game, hosted in Cleveland.

===== Tryout with Indians =====
On September 1, 1942, the Chicago Tribune reported that Bremer and teammate Sam Jethroe were to receive tryouts from the Cleveland Indians prior to the 1943 season. Indians president Alva Bradley quickly reneged on his promise, stating to the Cleveland Call and Post that his scouts had seen Bremer, Jethroe, and a third Buckeye, Parnell Woods play in the second East-West Game on August 18 in Cleveland, and based upon that one viewing had decided that the three "did not stack up as material for the Indians".

===== Car accident =====
On September 7, one of three vehicles carrying Buckeyes players and staff crashed on Route 20 near Geneva, Ohio. Teammates Ulysses Brown and Smoky Owens were killed instantly. Four other Buckeyes were injured including Bremer, who was hospitalized and missed the remainder of the season with a fractured skull and concussion.

==== 1943 ====
Bremer moved with the Buckeyes to Cleveland in 1943, posting a 4-3 record with a .494 ERA.

==== 1944 ====
In 1944, Bremer was rejected for military service and returned to the Buckeyes, logging a 5-2 record and 2.06 ERA. He was once again selected to play in the All Star Game, pitching 1.2 scoreless innings in the West's victory 7-4 over the East.

==== 1945 ====
Bremer was the ace of the Buckeyes pitching staff in 1945, posting a 7-1 record and 2.25 ERA in league play, earning another All-Star appearance and leading the Buckeyes to the Negro League World Series. Bremer closed out the All-Star game, coming in to record the final out of 9-6 West victory. In the World Series, Bremer was the star of game two, holding the Homestead Grays to two runs and knocking in the game winning run in the bottom of the ninth with a ground rule double. The Buckeyes went on to sweep the Grays 4-0 for the championship.

==== 1946 ====
Hampered by injuries, Bremer remained on the Buckeyes roster but was used less frequently, posting a 5.61 ERA in 33.2 innings.

==== 1947 ====
Bremer returned to the Buckeyes' deep pitching staff in 1947, primarily in a relief role. The Buckeyes won their second pennant in 3 years, but lost to the New York Cubans in the Negro League World Series four games to one. In his only appearance in the series, Bremer gave up 6 runs and 12 hits in a 9-4 complete game loss.

==== 1948 ====
Bremer made only one recorded league appearance in 1948, starting and pitching a lone complete game loss.

==== 1949 ====
The Buckeyes moved to Louisville in 1949, and Bremer reported to the team prior to the season opener in May. In an interview with the Call and Post, Bremer reported that he and at least 4 other players quit the team over unpaid salary.

=== Rochester Royals ===
In 1949, the semi-pro Rochester Royals of the Southern Minnesota League signed several Negro League players including Bremer. Bremer suffered from control issues in his first two starting appearances and was moved to left field before injuring himself on a slide into first base.

=== New Orleans Creoles ===
In addition to pitching in Rochester in 1949, Bremer returned to his hometown and briefly joined 1945 Buckeyes teammates Bill Jefferson and Buddy Armour on the independent New Orleans Creoles.

== Death and legacy ==
Gene Bremer died at age 54 in Cleveland and is buried at Evergreen Memorial Park in Bedford Heights, Ohio. In 2011 Lorain High School honored Bremer between games of a doubleheader on "Rube Foster Night", presenting a plaque to his family. Bremer had eight children and one of his grandsons, J.R. Bremer, played professional basketball for the Cleveland Cavaliers.

== Confusion with other players ==
While Gene Bremer is credited in other early sources with time on the Cedar Rapids Rockets, a Yankees farm team in 1949, the Gene Bremer listed on the team's rosters is a different player. The Bremers on the 1949 Rockets were twin brothers and Moville, Iowa natives Jack and Gene Bremer (of no relation).

== See also ==
- 1945 Cleveland Buckeyes Season
- 1945 Negro League World Series
- East-West All-Star Game
