= 1945 Negro World Series =

Team (Wins)	Managers
Cleveland Buckeyes (4)	Quincy Trouppe
Washington Homestead Grays (0)	Vic Harris
- Dates: September 13–20
- Venues: Cleveland: Cleveland Municipal Stadium (1); Cleveland: League Park (2); Washington: Griffith Stadium (3); Philadelphia: Shibe Park (4)
- Hall of Famers: Washington: Cool Papa Bell, Ray Brown, Josh Gibson, Buck Leonard, Jud Wilson

In the 1945 Negro World Series, the Cleveland Buckeyes, champions of the Negro American League, swept the Washington Homestead Grays, champions of the Negro National League, four games to none.

== Summary ==
Cleveland won the series, 4–0.

Game	Date	Score	Location	Time	Attendance
1	September 13	Homestead Grays – 1, Cleveland Buckeyes – 2	Cleveland Stadium	1:39	8,000
2	September 16	Homestead Grays – 2, Cleveland Buckeyes – 4	League Park	2:30	15,000
3	September 18	Cleveland Buckeyes – 4, Homestead Grays – 0	Griffith Stadium	N/A	8,000
4	September 20	Cleveland Buckeyes – 5, Homestead Grays – 0	Shibe Park	1:45	9,958

== Matchups ==
=== Game 1 ===
Thursday, September 13, 1945 at Cleveland Stadium in Cleveland, Ohio
Team	1	2	3	4	5	6	7	8	9	R	H	E
Homestead	0	0	0	0	0	0	0	0	1	1	6	1
Cleveland	0	0	0	0	0	0	1	1	X	2	6	0
WP: Bill Jefferson (1–0) LP: Roy Welmaker (0–1); Attendance: 8,000; Boxscore

The two teams were evenly matched in pitchers (who each allowed six hits on 33 batters), with a little bit of timing and luck proving the difference in Cleveland prevailing in the opening game. Cleveland broke the scoreless drought in the seventh inning. Catcher Quincy Trouppe collected the lone extra base hit for the team on his triple to start the inning, and Johnnie Cowan helped him score on a sacrifice fly. In the eighth, first baseman Archie Ware hit a single to left, and a walk got him to second base, where right fielder Willie Grace lobbed a single into right field to score Ware for what proved to be the go-ahead run. The Grays threatened in the final frame with a one-out single by Dave Hoskins that was followed by a walk to Buck Leonard. Josh Gibson lined a single to center field to make it 2-1 and put Leonard on third. However, Sam Bankhead would hit the ball right to shortstop Avelino Canizares that he relayed to Cowan at second base, and he relayed it to Ware at first base to complete the double play that ended the game. Buckeye starter Jefferson hurled a complete game while allowing just six hits and one earned run while striking out four and walking two batters. Grays starter Welmaker threw eight innings and allowed two runs while walking three and striking out seven. The two teams followed the game the next day with an exhibition game played in Dayton at Hudson Field, which Homestead won 3-1, while Game 2 took place two days after that.

=== Game 2 ===
Sunday, September 16, 1945 at League Park in Cleveland, Ohio
Team	1	2	3	4	5	6	7	8	9	R	H	E
Homestead	0	0	0	1	1	0	0	0	0	2	7	1
Cleveland	0	0	0	0	0	0	2	0	2	4	8	0
WP: Gene Bremer (1-0) LP: Johnny Wright (0-1); Home runs: WAS: None; CLE: Willie Grace (1); Attendance: 15,000; Boxscore

Homestead took a lead midway through the game, but they could not hold it together late. Buck Leonard started the fourth inning with a single to right field, and Josh Gibson followed him with a double to left field. A fielder's choice and a flyout meant that the game was 1-0 with two outs, and a Jelly Jackson single was followed by a ground out to end the threats for more. In the fifth, Cool Papa Bell started the inning with a single, and he advanced to second on a sacrifice bunt. With two outs and Bell on third, a balk by the pitcher led to Bell scoring what proved to be the final run for the Grays. In the seventh, the Buckeyes would tie the score on the strength of hitting and timing. Willie Grace started the inning with a home run to right field to make it 2-1. Buddy Armour lined a double with one out to center field; with two outs, Eugene Bremer hit a ball to second baseman Jackson that he would bobble and make an error on, which led to Armour scoring. Avelino Canizares lined a single to keep the inning alive with two runners on, but Archie Ware hit a flyout to end the threat. In the bottom of the ninth inning, Quincy Trouppe started the inning with a double to center field. Facing Armour, Wright had one of his pitches go wild, which meant that Trouppe went to third as the potential winning run. Armour (who went 1-for-3 in the game) would be walked intentionally afterwards, and he rewarded it by stealing second base not long after. Johnnie Cowan (0-for-3 in the game) would then be intentionally walked to load the bases with no out with the pitcher in Gene Bremer to bat. He proceeded to line a double to right field, which scored Trouppe, Armour, and Cowan as the Buckeyes snatched Game 2 of the series.

=== Game 3 ===
Tuesday, September 18, 1945 at Griffith Stadium in Washington, D.C.
Team	1	2	3	4	5	6	7	8	9	R	H	E
Cleveland	0	0	3	0	0	0	0	0	1	4	7	0
Homestead	0	0	0	0	0	0	0	0	0	0	3	2
WP: Jeff Jefferson (1–0) LP: Roy Welmaker (0–2); Attendance: 8,000; Boxscore

The Buckeyes gripped the Grays with a shutout that left the defending champions on the brink despite having left more runners on base than Cleveland (eight to six). Starter George "Jeff" Jefferson threw a shutout while allowing three hits with five walks and three strikeouts, while Roy Welmaker allowed four runs on seven hits with two walks and five strikeouts. The trouble for the Grays started in the third inning, as catcher Josh Gibson would drop a foul fly hit by Avelino Canizares, and the batter was soon walked. A bunt attempt by Archie Ware led to an error by Welmaker and two runners on with no out. A forceout was followed by a single to get runners on second and third for Willie Grace, who responded with a flyout to the outfield to score Ware. Quincy Trouppe was intentionally walked to set up runners at second and third. Buddy Armour would line a two-run single to center to give the Buckeyes a 3-0 lead (entirely of unearned runs). The game stood quiet until the ninth, when Cleveland added onto their lead after Jefferson grounded out to score Armour (who led the game with a 3-for-3 performance), who had singled to start the inning. Vic Harris was the final out for the Grays, shutout for just the 4th time in 20 games played in the Series over the past four seasons.

=== Game 4 ===
Thursday, September 20, 1945 at Shibe Park in Philadelphia, Pennsylvania
Team	1	2	3	4	5	6	7	8	9	R	H	E
Cleveland	2	0	0	1	0	0	2	0	0	5	10	0
Homestead	0	0	0	0	0	0	0	0	0	0	4	2
WP: Frank Carswell (1–0) LP: Ray Brown (0–1); Attendance: 9,958; Boxscore

The Homestead Grays had made it to the Negro World Series four consecutive times (with two championships won), but they would end the fourth one just as they had done the first time around in being swept. Cleveland started the proceedings with two runs in the first; Avelino Canizares had a leadoff single, which was followed by a walk to Archie Ware and a single by Sam Jethroe. With the bases loaded for Parnell Woods, he hit a ball to second baseman Bozo Jackson that he could not get a hold on (with no assist from right fielder Dave Hoskins). While Woods was called out at second, two runs had scored on the error, which was followed by two quick outs to close the inning. In the fourth, the Buckeyes started with two straight singles by Willie Grace and Quincy Trouppe that were followed by a ground out and a flyout (by Johnnie Cowan) that made it 3-0 Cleveland. The scoring popped once more in the seventh, as a Sam Jethroe two-out single scored runners on second and third (who had gotten there on a single and an error). Sam Bankhead was the final out for the Grays, who like the Buckeyes had left six runners of base. For the Buckeyes, starter Frank Carswell threw a complete-game shutout while allowing just four hits with three walks and one strikeout and a hit batsman. For the Grays, Ray Brown had allowed ten hits with five runs (two earned) with a walk and a strikeout.

Although the series formally ended there, the two teams would play three exhibition games in the span of the next three days; the game on September 22 was played in Wilmington Park in Wilmington, Delaware (won by Cleveland 4-1), while Yankee Stadium hosted a doubleheader between the two the following day (which Homestead won 7-1 in both games).

== See also ==
- 1945 World Series
