= Herman Watts =

- Pitcher
- Born: December 18, 1919; Covington, Kentucky, U.S.
- Died: September 14, 1960 (aged 40); Indianapolis, Indiana, U.S.
- Batted: Left Threw: Left

Negro league baseball debut
- 1941, for the New York Black Yankees

Last appearance
- 1942, for the Cincinnati Buckeyes

Teams
- New York Black Yankees (1941); Jacksonville Red Caps (1941); Cincinnati Buckeyes (1942)

Herman "Lefty" Watts (December 18, 1919 – September 14, 1960) was an American professional baseball pitcher in the Negro leagues. He played in 1941 with the New York Black Yankees Jacksonville Red Caps, and in 1942 with the Cincinnati Buckeyes. Watts was involved in a car accident on September 7, 1942. Ulysses Brown and Smoky Owens died, while Watts, Eugene Bremmer, Alonzo Boone, and Wilbur Hayes were injured.

Watts returned to Indianapolis, becoming combination player-manager of the Indianapolis ABCs.
