= List of Cleveland Buckeyes seasons =

This list of Cleveland Buckeyes seasons compiles games played by the Cleveland Buckeyes. For seasons when the Buckeyes were league members or an associate team, only games that counted in official league standings are included. Seasons when they had no league membership and played an independent or barnstorming schedule include games against primarily major-league-caliber teams.

Contemporary coverage of games and standings was spotty and inconsistent. Ongoing research continuously discovers unreported or misreported games, while some games are probably lost forever. Therefore, Negro league seasonal finishes will likely remain incomplete and subjective.

== Year by year ==
Negro World Series Champions (1924–1927 & 1942–1948) *	League champions ‡	Other playoff ^

Season	Level	League	Season finish		Games	Wins	Loses	Ties	Win% (Note: Placement in annual standings were generally decided by win percentage; "games behind" were never used.)	Postseason	Ref
Season	Level	League	Full (Note: Finish in years when only a full season was indicates actual place in standings. Finish in years a split season was played indicates combined place in standings for both halves of the season.)	Split (Note: Years with a "—" did not play a split season. "1st" or 2nd" indicate which half of the season was won. "DNQ" indicates team did not win either half and did not qualify for postseason.)	Games	Wins	Loses	Ties	Win%	Postseason	Ref
Cincinnati–Cleveland Buckeyes
1942	Major	NAL	2	—	65	42	22	1	.656		
Cleveland Buckeyes
1943	Major	NAL	2	DNQ	65	39	25	1	.609		
1944	Major	NAL	2	DNQ	79	46	33	0	.582		
1945*	Major	NAL	1	1st & 2nd	81	63	17	1	.788	Won Negro World Series (Homestead Grays) 4–0; Won pennant outright	
1946	Major	NAL	3	DNQ	59	31	27	1	.534		
1947‡	Major	NAL	1	—	67	49	18	0	.731	Lost Negro World Series (New York Cubans) 4–1–1; Won pennant outright	
1948	Major	NAL	3	DNQ	87	42	43	2	.494		
Louisville Buckeyes
1949	Minor	NAL	5 (W)	—	83	19	64	0	.229		
Cleveland Buckeyes
1950	Minor	NAL	5 (W)	—	42	3	39	0	.071		

Key
