= Milt Smith =

American baseball player (1929-1997)

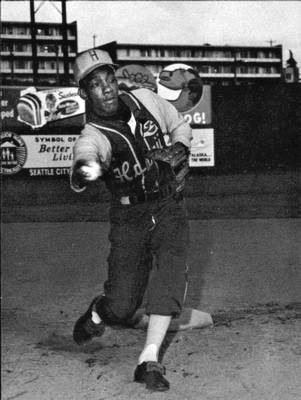
- Smith playing for the Hawaii Islanders, circa 1961
- Third baseman
- Born: March 27, 1929; Columbus, Georgia, U.S.
- Died: April 11, 1997 (aged 68); San Diego, California, U.S.
- Batted: Right Threw: Right

Professional debut
- NgL: 1949, for the Philadelphia Stars
- MLB: July 21, 1955, for the Cincinnati Redlegs

Last MLB appearance
- September 25, 1955, for the Cincinnati Redlegs

MLB statistics
- Batting average: .196
- Home runs: 3
- Runs batted in: 8
- Stats at Baseball Reference

Teams
- Negro leagues: Philadelphia Stars (1949, 1950–1951); Kansas City Monarchs (1950); Major League Baseball: Cincinnati Redlegs (1955)

Career highlights and awards
- NgL All-Star (1951)

Milton Smith (March 27, 1929 – April 11, 1997) was an American professional baseball player who appeared in 36 Major League Baseball games for the 1955 Cincinnati Redlegs. Primarily a third baseman, he threw and batted right-handed, stood 5 feet 10 inches (1.78 m) tall and weighed 165 pounds (75 kg).

Smith was born in Columbus, Georgia. He broke into professional baseball in 1948 with the minor league Raleigh Tigers of the Negro American Association and then the New Orleans Creoles of the Negro Southern League. In 1949, Smith was with the Charlotte Blues of the NAA before moving on to the major league Philadelphia Stars of the Negro American League later that year. He played for the Stars until 1951, with only a brief stint with the Kansas City Monarchs at the start of 1950.

Smith entered "organized baseball" in 1952 when he was signed by the San Diego Padres of the Pacific Coast League. His contract was purchased by Cincinnati in November 1954, and he was optioned back to San Diego. The Redlegs recalled him in July 1955 after Smith batted .338 for the PCL Padres with 65 runs batted in in 108 games.

He stayed with Cincinnati for the remainder of the baseball season, starting 25 games at third base and three at second base. He collected 20 hits, including three doubles, one triple and three home runs. He was sent back to the Pacific Coast League in 1956 and played the remainder of his career in the minors, retiring after the 1961 campaign.

Milt Smith died in San Diego at the age of 68 and was interred in that city's Greenwood Memorial Park.

== See also ==
- List of Negro league baseball players who played in Major League Baseball
