= Alonzo Boone =

- Pitcher / Manager
- Born: January 13, 1908; Decatur, Alabama, U.S.
- Died: April 8, 1982 (aged 74); Cleveland, Ohio, U.S.
- Batted: Right Threw: Right

debut
- 1929, for the Memphis Red Sox

Last appearance
- 1950, for the Cleveland Buckeyes
- Stats at Baseball Reference
- Managerial record at Baseball Reference

Teams
- As player: Kansas City Monarchs (1926–1934, 1936); Memphis Red Sox (1929); Cleveland Cubs (1931); Birmingham Black Barons (1932, 1944–1945); Cleveland Bears (1939–1940); Cleveland Buckeyes (1942, 1946–1947, 1949–1950); Louisville Buckeyes (1948); As manager: Cleveland Buckeyes (1948-1950)

Alonzo D. "Buster" Boone (January 13, 1908 – April 8, 1982) was an American professional baseball pitcher and manager in the Negro leagues. He played from 1929 to 1947 with several teams. Boone was involved in a car accident on September 7, 1942. Ulysses Brown and Smoky Owens died, while Boone, Eugene Bremmer, Herman Watts, and Wilbur Hayes were injured. From 1948 to 1950, Boone managed the Cleveland/St. Louis Buckeyes.
