= 1945 Cleveland Buckeyes season =

1945 Cleveland Buckeyes
- League: Negro American League
- Ballpark: League Park
- City: Cleveland
- Record: 52–20–2 (.716)
- League place: 1st
- Managers: Quincy Trouppe

The 1945 Cleveland Buckeyes baseball team competed in Negro American League (NAL) during the 1945 baseball season. The team compiled a 52–20–2 (.716) record.

The team won the NAL pennant and defeated the Washington Homestead Grays in the 1945 Negro World Series, four games to none.

Quincy Trouppe was the team's manager. Avelino Cañizares and Sam Jethroe were the leading hitters with batting averages of .365 and .339. Gene Bremmer was the leading pitcher with a 6–1 record and 2.07 earned run average.
