= Frank Fleming (baseball) =

American baseball player

- Pitcher
- Born: July 5, 1919; Morganton, North Carolina, U.S.
- Died: July 22, 1989 (aged 70); Morganton, North Carolina, U.S.

Negro league baseball debut
- 1946, for the Cleveland Buckeyes

Last appearance
- 1946, for the Cleveland Buckeyes

Teams
- Cleveland Buckeyes (1946)

Frank Fleming (July 5, 1919 – July 22, 1989), sometimes spelled "Flemming" and nicknamed "Boonie", was an American Negro league pitcher in the 1940s.

A native of Morganton, North Carolina, Fleming played for the Cleveland Buckeyes in 1946. He threw a no-hitter the same season while playing for the Asheville Blues. Fleming died in Morganton in 1989 at age 70.
