= James C. Kilgore =

- Born: 2 May 1928; Jackson Parish
- Died: 16 December 1988; Beachwood

James C. Kilgore (May 2, 1928 - December 16, 1988) was an African American essayist and poet and English Professor at Cuyahoga Community College in Cleveland, Ohio.

== Biography ==
James C. Kilgore was born on May 2, 1928 in Jackson Parish, (Ansley) Louisiana, according to Kilgore, a small sawmill town where "the town itself disappeared [...] when the sawmill closed rather than accept unionization of its workers." His family also lived for a time in Arkansas. Kilgore went to school at Wiley College in Marshall, Texas earning his BA there in English. He attended on a basketball scholarship. He also earned further degrees at the University of Missouri (an MA degree and where he started writing poetry in earnest) and Columbia Pacific University. In the 1950s Kilgore served in the US Army as a telegrapher (1952–1954). He moved around the United States and taught high school English before settling in Cleveland where he taught English at the Cuyahoga Community College from 1966 to 1986., where he founded the Cuyahoga Writers Conference in 1974 and helped organize an Urban Writers Workshop Series in Cleveland. In 1976 he contributed to the United States Bicentennial celebrations through the Cleveland Area Arts Council who commissioned him to write "The Black Bicentennial" poem which was subsequently read aloud in Congress, thus entering the Congressional Record. Kilgore stated that writing the poem was painful. "I was forced to call upon experiences I didn't care to relive and to go over periods of history, such as the murders of Martin Luther King Jr. and John and Robert Kennedy, that had left me with a deep sense of personal loss."

He also served as an adjunct professor of Afro-American literature at the University of Akron. He worked with Professor Annetta Jefferson at the College of Wooster in a poetry group in the late 1980s.

In 1960 he married Alberta Gunnels, a teacher, and together they had three children. In 1962 he published his first poem. He was quite tall at six feet five inches, and is said to have a voice like that of James Earl Jones. In his childhood he often spoke in church and in high school he won a public speaking contest.

James Kilgore died on December 16, 1988 in a house fire in Beachwood, Ohio. Two other family members escaped before firefighters arrived at the scene. His wife and son survived him. Fire Chief Bill Kaselak said the blaze was reported at 2:40 a.m. Friday and it was reported that it started in a first-floor bedroom and then spread throughout the house.

== Publications ==
- The Big Buffalo and Other Poems: A Sampler of the Poetry of James C. Kilgore (1970)
- Midnight Blast and Other Poems (1971)
- A Time for Black Devotion (1973)
- Let It Pass (1976)
- Until I Met You (1978)
- African Violet, Poem for a Black Woman: New and Selected Poems (Detroit: Lotus Press) (1982)
- I've Been in the Storm So Long (1983)
- During Arabica Lunch (1986)
- Published poems in Phylon, Negro Digest, Plain Dealer, Congressional Record

== Awards and Memberships ==
- Case Western Reserve University fellowship (1964)
- University of Nebraska fellowship (1966)
- University of California, Santa Barbara fellowship (1968)
- Cuyahoga Writers' Conference founder (1974)
- Urban Writers Workshop Series organizer (1974)
- Ohio Arts Council Award (1978)
- Ohio Poet of the Year in 1982 for African Violet
- Modern Language Association of America member
- Renaissance Society of America member
- National Council of Teachers of English
- Ohio Poets Association

== External Sources ==
James C. Kilgore papers at Ohio University Libraries
