= Otha Bailey =

American baseball player (1931–2013)

- Catcher
- Born: June 30, 1931; Hunstville, Alabama, U. S.
- Died: September 17, 2013 (aged 82); Birmingham, Alabama, U. S.
- Batted: Right Threw: Right

Negro leagues debut
- 1949

Last appearance
- 1959
- Stats at Baseball Reference

Teams
- Birmingham Black Barons; Chattanooga Choo-Choos; Cleveland Buckeyes; Houston Eagles; New Orleans Eagles

Otha William "Bill" Bailey (June 30, 1931 – September 17, 2013) was an American Negro league baseball player. He was a catcher for many teams. He played for the Birmingham Black Barons, Chattanooga Choo-Choos, Cleveland Buckeyes, Houston Eagles, and the New Orleans Eagles from 1949 to 1959. Throughout his career, his nickname was "L'il Catch".

Bailey was born in Huntsville, Alabama, and died in Birmingham, Alabama.
