= Junius Bibbs =

American baseball player (1910–1980)

- Infielder
- Born: October 31, 1910; Henderson, Kentucky, U.S.
- Died: September 11, 1980 (aged 69); Indianapolis, Indiana, U.S.
- Batted: Left Threw: Left

Negro league baseball debut
- 1933, Detroit Stars

Last appearance
- 1944, Cleveland Buckeyes

Career statistics
- Batting average: .284
- Slugging percentage: .347
- Stats at Baseball Reference

Teams
- Detroit Stars (1933); Cincinnati Tigers (1936–1937); Kansas City Monarchs (1938–1941); Chicago American Giants (1944); Cleveland Buckeyes (1944)

Career highlights and awards
- 1× All-Star selection (1937)

Junius Alexander Bibbs (October 31, 1910 – September 11, 1980), nicknamed "Rainey", was an American infielder in baseball's Negro leagues from about 1933 to 1944.

Bibbs was a star fullback at Indiana State University. While at college, he began playing with the Indianapolis ABCs and the Detroit Stars in the Negro Leagues. In 1937, he was selected to the West squad of the All-Star game. Biggs also played for the Chicago American Giants and the Kansas City Monarchs. With the Monarchs, he won three Negro American League Pennants in 1939, 1940, and 1941. He finished his career in 1944 with the Cleveland Buckeyes.

In 1947, Bibbs began his teaching and coaching career at Indianapolis' Crispus Attucks High School. He taught at Crispus Attucks for 23 years, where he was also the director of intramural athletics, and 2 years at Thomas Carr Howe High School, retiring in 1972, He coached future Harlem Globetrotters Bailey "Flap" Robertson, Hallie Bryant and Willie Gardner, Bobby Joe Edmonds, Willie Merriweather and the "Admiral" Oscar Robertson. Bibbs was inducted into the Indiana Baseball Hall of Fame in 2011

== Early life ==
Junius Bibbs was born in Henderson, Kentucky on October 31, 1910, to Lloyd Bibbs, a veteran of World War I and first commander of the American Legion Post in Terre Haute, Indiana, and Catherine Carr Bibbs, whose family had ties to the prominent families of Henderson, including the Powells and the Starlings.

Bibbs' early life was spent growing up in an extended household that included his great-grandmother, Lizzie Powell, a former slave who had amassed some property, his grandfather, James Alexander Carr, whose father had died as a Union Army soldier at the end of the Civil War, and his grandmother Maria Carr, the first African-American librarian in Henderson.

The Bibbs family, including his sister Eloise, moved to Terre Haute, when he was about 10 years old. While there, Bibbs attended Paul Lawrence Dunbar Elementary school and lettered in track, baseball and football at the former Wiley High School, from which he was graduated in 1927. He was one of the 7.7 percent of the African American population older than age 25 that had a high school diploma in 1940.

== The Indiana State years ==
Though many African Americans chose to attend historically Black colleges and universities in the South, Bibbs opted to remain in his own community and attend what was then Indiana State Teachers College, now known as Indiana State University. In 1937, Bibbs became one of the 1.3 percent of African Americans who had a four-year college degree by 1940.

While earning his bachelor of science degree in science and education, Bibbs became a star fullback on the college's football team. Known as "the only race player on Indiana's collegiate gridiron," his absence in an October 1935 game is given as a reason for the team's 12–0 loss against Cape Girardeau.

Bibbs was a member of the Omega Psi Phi fraternity.

== Baseball career ==
While attending college, the switch hitter began his baseball career, playing with the Indianapolis ABCs and the Detroit Stars. His 1937 record with the Cincinnati Tigers—reportedly batting .404 that season—led to his selection to the West squad of the All-Star game. Elizabeth Brizentine-Taft also reported in The Indianapolis Recorder that Bibbs at one time played first base for the "Grays," presumably the Homestead Grays.

Part way through his season with the Chicago American Giants in 1938, he was recruited to the legendary Kansas City Monarchs. From 1938 to 1941, he was a starter for the Monarchs, playing second base and helping the team win three (1939–1941) Negro American League Pennants. He finished his career in 1944 with the Cleveland Buckeyes.

It was during his baseball years that Bibbs acquired the Negro Leagues nickname, "Rainey." As the story goes, a reporter asked Bibbs for the spelling of his first name, which often was misspelled and mispronounced by others. Rather than endure having to spell and respell his name, Bibbs suggested the reporter just call him "Rainey" since it was raining that day.

== High school coaching career ==
In 1947, Bibbs began his teaching and coaching career at Indianapolis' Crispus Attucks High School, a historically Black high school. Bibbs taught in the Indianapolis Public Schools system from 1947 to 1972, spending 23 years at Crispus Attucks and two years at Thomas Carr Howe High School, retiring in 1972.

As director of intramural athletics, Bibbs helped establish intramural sports, including basketball, volleyball and track in 1952 at Crispus Attucks. That same year, he also coached wrestling as a varsity sport for the first time in the school's history.

He taught biology and coached several outstanding athletes; such as future Harlem Globetrotters Bailey "Flap" Robertson, Hallie Bryant and Willie Gardner; Bobby Joe Edmonds, Willie Merriweather and the legendary Oscar Robertson. Of the numerous students, 13 were named to the Indiana All-Star team and 12 have been inducted into the Indiana Basketball Hall of Fame

== Commitment to education ==
Bibbs' commitment to education started in the classroom rather than on the sports field. As a first-generation college graduate, he was committed to helping later generations of African-American students attend college at Indiana State as an active member of the Statonians alumni association, which raised money for scholarships. He served as vice president of the Statonians from 1971 to 1972.

== Posthumous honors ==
Bibbs died near age 70 in Indianapolis, Indiana.

He was inducted into the Indiana Baseball Hall of Fame in 2011, one of only four African Americans and one of three Negro Leagues players so honored. In 1998, he was inducted into the Indiana State University Hall of Fame, in part for his football talents as a Sycamores fullback, winning All-Indiana Intercollegiate Conference honors in 1934 and 1935.

On June 20, 2015, Bibbs was awarded the Coach & Educator Award by the Crispus Attucks High School Alumni Lettermen's Club.

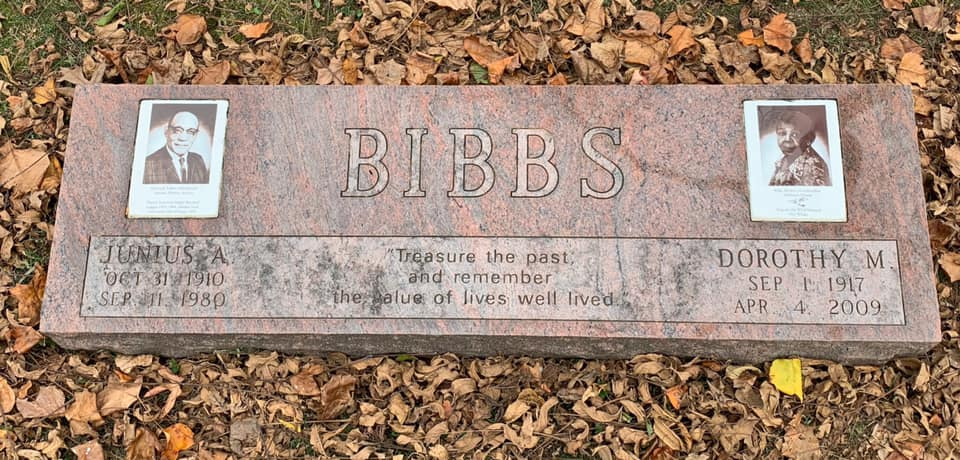
Photo of a grave at Crown Hill Cemetery provided to Wikimedia Commons by Crown Hill Foundation.

Bibbs also is listed as a notable African American by Crown Hill Cemetery, where he is buried, and on the University of Kentucky Library's Notable Kentucky African Americans Database.
