= Eugene Smith (baseball) =

American baseball player (1916–2011)

Gene Smith
- Pitcher
- Born: April 23, 1916; Ansley, Louisiana, U.S.
- Died: May 25, 2011 (aged 95); Richmond Heights, Missouri, U.S.
- Batted: Both Threw: Right

Negro league baseball debut
- 1940, for the St. Louis–New Orleans Stars

Last appearance
- 1948, for the Cleveland Buckeyes

Teams
- St. Louis–New Orleans Stars (1940–41); New York Black Yankees (1942); Homestead Grays (1946–47); Cleveland Buckeyes (1947–48)

Eugene F. "Gene" Smith (April 23, 1916 – May 25, 2011) was an American pitcher who played for several Negro league baseball teams between 1938 and 1951. Listed at 6' 1", 185 lb., Smith was a switch hitter and threw right-handed. Smith was known as a hard-throwing pitcher during a career that saw him play for nine different Negro league clubs. In addition, he pitched for teams in Canada, Mexico, Puerto Rico and Minor League Baseball, taking a three-year break to serve in the US Army during World War II (1943–1945).

== Early life ==
He was born in Ansley, Louisiana. His younger brother, Quincy Smith, also played in the Negro leagues.

== Negro league career ==
Smith entered the Negro leagues in 1938 with the Atlanta Black Crackers, playing for them one year before joining the Ethiopian Clowns (1939), St. Louis–New Orleans Stars (1940–1941), Kansas City Monarchs (1941) and New York Black Yankees (1942). Following military discharge, he played for the Pittsburgh Crawfords (1946), Homestead Grays (1946–1947), Cleveland Buckeyes (1946–1950) and Chicago American Giants (1951).

In 1938, while pitching for the Black Crackers, Smith threw two no-hitters in one day, and in 1941 with the Stars hurled another against the Black Yankees. He also started Games 3 and 6 of the 1947 Negro World Series against the New York Cubans.

== Minor leagues ==
Smith ended his career in 1953, dividing his playing time with the Statesboro Pilots of the Georgia State League and the Fond du Lac Panthers of the Wisconsin State League.

== Death ==
Smith was a longtime resident of Richmond Heights, Missouri, where he died at the age of 95 of congestive heart failure.

== External References ==
- Career statistics from Baseball Reference · Baseball Reference (Minors) and Seamheads
- Eugene Smith at Find a Grave
