= Memphis blues (disambiguation) =

Memphis blues is a music genre.

Memphis blues may refer to:

- Memphis Blues (album), by Cyndi Lauper (2010)
- Memphis Blues (minor league), a minor league team (1968–76)
- Memphis Blues (Negro league baseball), a minor Negro league team (1947)
- "The Memphis Blues", a song by W. C. Handy (1912)
- "Stuck Inside of Mobile with the Memphis Blues Again", a song by Bob Dylan (1966)
- Memphis Blues, a women's professional basketball team that played in the Women's Basketball Association (1993–95)
