= Virgil Harris =

American baseball player

- Pitcher
- Born: August 4, 1911; Petrey, Alabama, U.S.
- Died: July 3, 1980 (aged 68); Cincinnati, Ohio, U.S.
- Batted: Both Threw: Right

Negro league baseball debut
- 1936, for the Cincinnati Tigers

Last appearance
- 1936, for the Cincinnati Tigers

Teams
- Cincinnati Tigers (1936)

Virgil Charles Harris (August 4, 1911 – July 3, 1980), nicknamed "Schoolboy", was an American Negro league pitcher who played in the 1930s.

A native of Petrey, Alabama, Harris was the brother of fellow Negro leaguer Sonny Harris and brother-in-law of Negro leaguer Jesse Houston. He played for the Cincinnati Tigers in 1936. In four recorded appearances on the mound, Harris posted a 4.34 ERA over 18.2 innings. He died in Cincinnati, Ohio in 1980 at age 68.
