= Earnest Long =

American baseball player (1927–2000)

- Pitcher
- Born: October 11, 1927; Chattanooga, Tennessee, U.S.
- Died: September 20, 2000 (aged 72); Rome, Georgia, U.S.
- Batted: Left Threw: Right

Negro league baseball debut
- 1945, for the Chattanooga Choo-Choos

Last appearance
- 1950, for the Cleveland Buckeyes

Teams
- Chattanooga Choo-Choos (1945–1947); Cleveland Buckeyes (1948–1950)

Earnest Sylvestor Long (October 11, 1927 – September 20, 2000), nicknamed "the Kid", was an American Negro league pitcher for the Chattanooga Choo-Choos and Cleveland Buckeyes between 1945 and 1950.

A native of Chattanooga, Tennessee, Long was selected to the West squad for the 1949 East–West All-Star Game. He died in Rome, Georgia in 2000 at age 72.
