= Adolphus Grimes =

American baseball player

- Outfielder
- Born: July 6, 1913; Greensboro, Georgia, U.S.
- Died: February 6, 1998 (aged 84); Atlanta, Georgia, U.S.

Negro league baseball debut
- 1943, for the Cleveland Buckeyes

Last appearance
- 1944, for the Atlanta Black Crackers

Teams
- Cleveland Buckeyes (1943); Atlanta Black Crackers (1943–1944)

Adolphus Grimes (July 6, 1913 – February 6, 1998) was an American Negro league outfielder in the 1940s.

A native of Greensboro, Georgia, Grimes played for the Cleveland Buckeyes and the Atlanta Black Crackers in 1943, and played for Atlanta again the following season. In five recorded games, he posted four hits in 19 plate appearances. Grimes died in Atlanta, Georgia in 1998 at age 84.
