= Jesse Houston =

American baseball player

- Pitcher
- Born: July 17, 1909; Montgomery, Alabama, U.S.
- Died: April 7, 1968 (aged 58); Cincinnati, Ohio, U.S.
- Threw: Right

Negro league baseball debut
- 1936, for the Cincinnati Tigers

Last appearance
- 1941, for the Homestead Grays
- Stats at Baseball Reference

Teams
- Cincinnati Tigers (1936–1937); Chicago American Giants (1938–1939); Homestead Grays (1941)

Benjamin Jesse Houston (July 17, 1909 – April 7, 1968) was an American Negro league pitcher who played between 1936 and 1941.

A native of Montgomery, Alabama, Houston was the brother-in-law of fellow Negro leaguers Virgil Harris and Sonny Harris. He made his Negro leagues debut in 1936 with the Cincinnati Tigers. Houston spent two seasons with Cincinnati, then spent the following two seasons with the Chicago American Giants and finished his career in 1941 with the Homestead Grays. He died in Cincinnati, Ohio in 1968 at age 58.
