= John Brown (1940s pitcher) =

American baseball player

- Pitcher
- Born: October 23, 1918; Hamburg, Arkansas, U.S.
- Died: March 3, 1999 (aged 80); Detroit, Michigan, U.S.
- Batted: Right Threw: Right

Negro league baseball debut
- 1944, for the Cleveland Buckeyes

Last appearance
- 1948, for the Cleveland Buckeyes
- Stats at Baseball Reference

Teams
- Cleveland Buckeyes (1944–1948)

John Wesley Brown (October 23, 1918 – March 3, 1999) was an American Negro league pitcher in the 1940s.

A native of Hamburg, Arkansas, Brown made his Negro leagues debut in 1944 with the Cleveland Buckeyes. He played five seasons for Cleveland through 1948, and was selected to play in the East–West All-Star Game in 1946. Brown died in Detroit, Michigan in 1999 at age 80.
