= Ray Robinson (baseball) =

American baseball player

- Pitcher
- Threw: Left

Negro league baseball debut
- 1938, for the Newark Eagles

Last appearance
- 1947, for the Philadelphia Stars

Teams
- Newark Eagles (1938); Cincinnati Buckeyes (1942); Baltimore Elite Giants (1947)

Raymond Robinson was an American professional baseball pitcher in the Negro leagues and minor leagues. He played with the Newark Eagles in 1938, the Cincinnati Buckeyes in 1942, and the Baltimore Elite Giants in 1947.
