= George Provens =

American baseball player

- Third baseman
- Born: June 1, 1918; Lexington, Kentucky, U.S.
- Died: May 7, 1982 (aged 63); Canton, Ohio, U.S.

Negro league baseball debut
- July 30, 1945, for the Cleveland Buckeyes

Last appearance
- August 1, 1945, for the Cleveland Buckeyes

Teams
- Cleveland Buckeyes (1945)

George Edward Provens (June 1, 1918 – May 7, 1982) was an American Negro league third baseman in the 1940s. He played in two games for the Cleveland Buckeyes of the Negro American League (NAL) in 1945.

== Biography ==
George Edward Provens was born on June 1, 1918, in Lexington, Kentucky. In late 1943, he was involved in a fight with his friend, Lee Fulp, over a woman. Fulp died of a knife wound. Provens said he accidentally cut Fulp while attempting to disarm him. Provens was found guilty of manslaughter and sentenced to five years probation.

In 1944, Provens was a "thriving" infielder and pitcher for the City Merchants club in Canton, Ohio's Class-A Baseball League. Later that year, he tried out for both the Cleveland Buckeyes of the Negro American League (NAL) and the Homestead Grays of the Negro National League. He had another tryout with the Buckeyes on July 16, 1945. Provens made his NAL debut for the Buckeyes on July 30 against the New York Cubans, pinch hitting for a single in the ninth inning. He played his second and final game for the Buckeyes on August 1 against the Baltimore Elite Giants, playing all nine innings at third base and going hitless in four plate appearances. Shortly thereafter in August 1945, he returned to the City Merchants and helped them win the city title.

In late 1945, Provens suffered a laceration after being hit in the head with a bottle by an unknown person at Beanie's Chicken Shack in Canton. Provens played for the Wyatt Apex Athletic Club in the Canton Class-A League in 1946. In early 1947, Provens was shot twice during a fight at Beanie's Chicken Shack. Due to still being on probation, Provens was given an indefinite sentence at Ohio State Reformatory. He played baseball for the Ohio State Reformatory All-Stars from 1947 to 1949, after which he was released from the reformatory. Provens played for the Rockets of the Canton Class-A League in 1950, and for the Canton Rockets traveling team in 1951 before returning to finish his career in the Canton Class-A League in 1952.

Provens became a little league baseball coach in 1951. He was an acquaintance of a young Thurman Munson, who played sandlot baseball in Canton. Provens was a manager in the Canton Class-A League from 1962 to 1965. He was also a local fisherman, and a sponsor for baseball, softball, basketball, and bowling teams.

Provens retired from the Ford Motor Company and also owned the Provens Family Foods grocery store. He was inducted into the Greater Canton Baseball Old-Timers Association Hall of Fame in 1969, and the Canton Negro Oldtimers Association Hall of Fame in 1976. He died on May 7, 1982, in Canton at age 63. He was buried at Forest Hill Cemetery in Canton.
