= Walter Burch =

American baseball player

- Catcher / Second baseman / Third baseman
- Born: May 2, 1908; Atlanta, Georgia, U.S.
- Died: May 10, 1985 (aged 77); Detroit, Michigan, U.S.
- Batted: Right Threw: Right

Negro league baseball debut
- 1934, for the Baltimore Black Sox

Last appearance
- 1946, for the Cleveland Buckeyes
- Stats at Baseball Reference

Teams
- Baltimore Black Sox (1934); Homestead Grays (1936); Cleveland Bears (1939); Chicago American Giants (1940); St. Louis–New Orleans Stars (1940-1941); Cincinnati/Cleveland Buckeyes (1942, 1944, 1946)

Walter Burch Jr. (May 2, 1908 – May 10, 1985), nicknamed "Double Duty", was an American Negro league baseball player in the 1930s and 1940s.

A native of Atlanta, Georgia, Burch played catcher, second baseman, and shortstop for various teams in the 1930s and 1940s, including the Kansas City Monarchs and the Homestead Grays. He served as a manager for the Cleveland Buckeyes in 1942. Burch died in Detroit, Michigan in 1985 at age 77.
