= George Minor (baseball) =

American baseball player (1919–1973)

- Outfielder
- Born: April 21, 1919; Henderson, Texas, U.S.
- Died: April 11, 1973

Negro league baseball debut
- 1944, for the Chicago American Giants

Last appearance
- 1948, for the Cleveland Buckeyes

Teams
- Chicago American Giants (1944); Cleveland Buckeyes (1946–1948)

George Minor Jr. (April 21, 1919 – April 1973) was an American Negro league outfielder in the 1940s.

== Early life and career ==
A native of Henderson, Texas, Minor made his Negro leagues debut in 1944 with the Chicago American Giants. He went on to play three seasons with the Cleveland Buckeyes. Minor died in 1973 at age 53.
