= Shirley Petway =

American baseball player

- Catcher
- Born: July 6, 1908; Nashville, Tennessee, U.S.
- Died: December 27, 1984 (aged 76); Chicago, Illinois, U.S.

Negro league baseball debut
- 1932, for the Birmingham Black Barons

Last appearance
- 1944, for the Cleveland Buckeyes

Teams
- Birmingham Black Barons (1932); Louisville Black Caps (1932); Nashville Elite Giants (1932); Detroit Stars (1937); Cleveland Buckeyes (1944)

Shirley H. Petway (July 6, 1908 – December 27, 1984) was an American Negro league catcher in the 1930s and 1940s.

A native of Nashville, Tennessee, Petway played for several teams between 1932 and 1944, including the Birmingham Black Barons, Detroit Stars, and Cleveland Buckeyes. He died in Chicago, Illinois in 1984 at age 76.
