= Thad Christopher =

American baseball player (1912–1973)

- Outfielder
- Born: December 24, 1912; Tampa, Florida, U.S.
- Died: January 28, 1973 (aged 60); Los Angeles, California, U.S.
- Batted: Left Threw: Right

Negro league baseball debut
- 1935, for the New York Black Yankees

Last appearance
- 1945, for the Newark Eagles
- Stats at Baseball Reference

Teams
- New York Black Yankees (1935); Newark Eagles (1936); New York Black Yankees (1938); Newark Eagles (1941); Cleveland Buckeyes (1942–1943); Homestead Grays (1943); Cincinnati Clowns (1943); Baltimore Elite Giants (1943); New York Black Yankees (1944–1945); Newark Eagles (1945)

Thadist B. Christopher (December 24, 1912 – January 28, 1973) was an American Negro league outfielder in the 1930s and 1940s.

== Career ==
A native of Tampa, Florida, Christopher made his Negro leagues debut in 1935 with the New York Black Yankees. He went on to play through 1945, including a stint with the Homestead Grays during their 1943 Negro World Series championship season.

Christopher played mostly left field and right field, but he also occasionally played first base or catcher. He wasn't known as a particularly skilled fielder or baserunner, but was considered to be a very good hitter capable of a lot of power. In 1944, Christopher slugged a ball completely out of the Polo Grounds.

Christopher was known for being hot-tempered at times. When he played with the Newark Eagles, he got into an altercation with another train passenger and ended up pulling his knife out. His teammate, Ray Dandridge, tried to get in between the two, and Christopher ended up cutting up Dandridge's new suit.

== Death ==
He died in Los Angeles, California in 1973 at age 60.
