= Sonny Harris (baseball) =

American baseball player

- Outfielder
- Born: October 19, 1914; Kent, Alabama, U.S.
- Died: November 20, 1990 (aged 76); Cincinnati, Ohio, U.S.

Negro league baseball debut
- 1934, for the Baltimore Black Sox

Last appearance
- 1942, for the Birmingham Black Barons
- Stats at Baseball Reference

Teams
- Baltimore Black Sox (1934); Philadelphia Stars (1934); Cincinnati Tigers (1936–1937); Cincinnati Buckeyes (1942); Birmingham Black Barons (1942)

James "Sonny" Harris (October 19, 1914 – November 20, 1990) was an American Negro league baseball outfielder who played in the 1930s and 1940s.

A native of Kent, Alabama, Harris was the brother of fellow Negro leaguer Virgil Harris and brother-in-law of Negro leaguer Jesse Houston.

He made his Negro leagues debut with the Philadelphia Stars and Baltimore Black Sox in 1934.

In 1936, he played with the Cincinnati Tigers and played for the Tigers again the following season. Harris later played for the Cincinnati Buckeyes and Birmingham Black Barons in 1942. He died in Cincinnati, Ohio in 1990 at age 76.
