= Tommy Harris (baseball) =

American baseball player

- Catcher
- Born: October 4, 1923; Canton, Ohio, U.S.
- Died: January 4, 1991 (aged 67); Stone Mountain, Georgia, U.S.
- Batted: Right Threw: Right

Negro league baseball debut
- 1946, for the Cleveland Buckeyes

Last appearance
- 1948, for the Cleveland Buckeyes
- Stats at Baseball Reference

Teams
- Cleveland Buckeyes (1946–1948)

Thomas C. Harris (October 4, 1923 – January 4, 1991) was an American Negro league catcher in the 1940s.

A native of Canton, Ohio, Harris made his Negro leagues debut with the Cleveland Buckeyes in 1946, and played three seasons for Cleveland. He died in Stone Mountain, Georgia in 1991 at age 67.
