= Joe Atkins (baseball) =

American baseball player

- Third baseman
- Born: May 9, 1922; Mobile, Alabama, U.S.
- Died: June 27, 1970 (aged 48); Pittsburgh, Pennsylvania, U.S.
- Batted: Right Threw: Right

Negro league baseball debut
- 1944, for the Newark Eagles

Last appearance
- 1947, for the Cleveland Buckeyes
- Stats at Baseball Reference

Teams
- Newark Eagles (1944); Cleveland Buckeyes (1947)

Joseph Oscar Atkins (May 9, 1922 – June 27, 1970) was an American Negro league third baseman in the 1940s.

A native of Mobile, Alabama, Atkins made his Negro leagues debut in 1946 with the Pittsburgh Crawfords. He played for the Cleveland Buckeyes the following season, and went on to play minor league baseball into the 1950s with such clubs as the Fargo-Moorhead Twins, Tampa Smokers, and Ottawa Athletics. Atkins died in Pittsburgh, Pennsylvania in 1970 at age 47 or 48.
