= Bill Jefferson (baseball) =

American baseball pitcher in the Negro leagues

- Pitcher
- Born: January 27, 1904; Clearview, Oklahoma, U.S.
- Died: May 31, 1972; Houston, Texas, U.S.
- Batted: Right Threw: Right

debut
- 1937, for the Cincinnati Tigers

Last appearance
- 1948, for the Cincinnati Crescents

MLB statistics
- Win–loss record: 20-22
- Earned run average: 4.05
- Strikeouts: 174
- Stats at Baseball Reference

Teams
- Cincinnati Tigers (1937); Memphis Red Sox (1938–1939); Cleveland Buckeyes (1942–1946); Louisville Buckeyes (1947); Cincinnati Crescents (1948)

Career highlights and awards
- Negro World Series champion (1945)

Willie "Bill" Jefferson (January 27, 1904 – May 31, 1972) was an American professional baseball pitcher in the Negro leagues.

A native of Clearview, Oklahoma, Jefferson was the brother of Jeff Jefferson, also played in the Negro leagues. Jefferson played with several teams from 1937 to 1948, spending the majority of his career with the Cleveland Buckeyes. He was the starting pitcher for the Buckeyes when they made it to the 1945 Negro World Series, starting Game 1 against the two-time defending champion Homestead Grays. He threw a complete game while allowing just six hits and one earned run while striking out four and walking two batters in a 2–1 win, and the Buckeyes would ultimately sweep the Grays in four games.

He served in the US Army during World War II, and died in Houston, Texas in 1976 at age 71 or 72.
