= Quincy Smith =

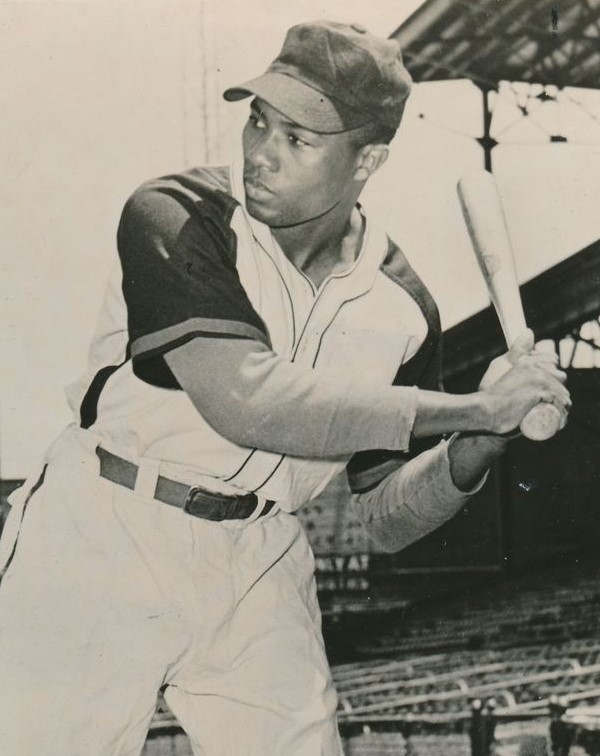
- Smith with the Chicago Brown Bombers, circa 1946
- Outfielder
- Born: February 3, 1918; Bienville Parish, Louisiana, U.S.
- Died: January 18, 2002 (aged 83); Terre Haute, Indiana, U.S.
- Batted: Both Threw: Right

Negro league baseball debut
- 1943, for the Cleveland Buckeyes

Last appearance
- 1945, for the Birmingham Black Barons

Teams
- Cleveland Buckeyes (1943); Birmingham Black Barons (1945)

Quincy O. Smith (February 3, 1918 – January 18, 2002) was an American outfielder who played in Negro league baseball and the Minor leagues. Listed at 5' 10, 171 lb., he was a switch hitter and threw right-handed. His older brother, Gene Smith, also played in the Negro and Minor leagues.

== Career ==
=== Negro league career ===
Smith entered the Negro Leagues in 1943, playing in part of two seasons for the Cleveland Buckeyes and the Pittsburgh Crawfords before joining the Birmingham Black Barons in 1945. He hit a .284 batting average for Birmingham during the first half of the season, but jumped to the Mexico City Reds of the Mexican League for the rest of the year. Once Major League Baseball started signing Negro League talent, he received a shot at organized baseball from 1949 through 1953, but never made it to the majors.

=== Minor league career ===
Smith spent six years in the minor leagues, all in the Mississippi–Ohio Valley League, while playing with four teams. He compiled four seasons with a batting average over .300, with a career-high of .317 in 1952 as a member of the Paris Lakers. He was also selected for the All-Star Team that faced the Decatur Commodores in the 1953 MSOH All-Star Game. Overall, he was a .305 hitter (788-for-2584), including 165 doubles, 55 triples, 45 home runs, and a .454 slugging percentage in 653 games played.

=== Post-baseball life ===
After the end of his baseball career, Smith worked 21 years at Amatarp, General Cable Corporation, in St. Louis, Missouri. He also coached baseball at the American Legion, in Paris, Illinois, and for a little league team in Terre Haute, Indiana. before his death there in 2002.
