= Nate Oliver =

American baseball player (1940–2025)

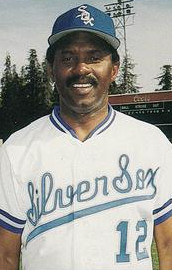
- Oliver in 1988
- Second baseman
- Born: December 13, 1940; St. Petersburg, Florida, U.S.
- Died: April 5, 2025 (aged 84); Oakland, California, U.S.
- Batted: Right Threw: Right

MLB debut
- April 9, 1963, for the Los Angeles Dodgers

Last MLB appearance
- September 27, 1969, for the Chicago Cubs

MLB statistics
- Batting average: .226
- Home runs: 2
- Runs batted in: 45
- Stats at Baseball Reference

Teams
- Los Angeles Dodgers (1963–1967); San Francisco Giants (1968); New York Yankees (1969); Chicago Cubs (1969)

Nathaniel Oliver (December 13, 1940 – April 5, 2025) was an American professional baseball player who had a seven-year major league career in the 1960s, mostly with the Los Angeles Dodgers.

== Playing career ==
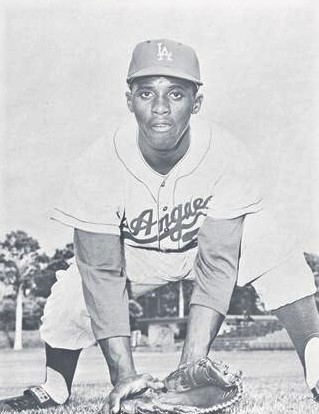
Oliver with the Dodgers in 1966

Oliver was signed by the Los Angeles Dodgers in 1959 and bounced around the minors for four seasons before making his MLB debut in 1963 as the Dodgers opening day second baseman, singling in each of his first two at-bats. He appeared in 65 games with the eventual World Series champions, playing primarily second base and hitting .239 with one home run, and spent a good chunk of the season in AAA with Spokane.

The next year, in 1964, Oliver had his most at-bats in the major leagues, getting 321 at-bats in 99 games, htting.243 with 9 doubles and 7 stolen bases. He again spent part of the season in the minors, a pattern that would follow him his entire playing career. In 1965 he appeared in only 8 games with the Dodgers, but in 1966 he played in 80 games with a .193 average. He appeared in Game 4 of the World Series as a pinch-runner. In 1967, his batting average improved to .237 in 77 games.

That off-season, he was traded to the San Francisco Giants with Ron Hunt for Tom Haller. He appeared in only 36 games for the Giants in 1968, hitting .178.

In December of 1968, Oliver was traded to the New York Yankees for Charley Smith. He played one game for the Yankees in 1969 before being traded in April to the Chicago Cubs for Lee Elia. He finished out his career in Chicago hitting .159 in 44 games, hitting the second--and last--home run of his MLB career.

Oliver spent two more seasons in the minors before retiring following the 1971 season at the age of 30.

== Coaching career ==
Oliver began his managerial career with the California League's Reno Silver Sox in 1988, where he actually had single at bat as a player. The next season Oliver managed the Arizona League Angels, and in 1990-91 he was at the helm of the Palm Springs Angels. He served as the hitting coach for AA Midland Angels in 1992 and AAA Albuquerque Dukes in 1993. In 1998, Oliver managed the Arizona League Cubs and in 1999 managed the Daytona Cubs in the Florida State League. In 2000 he was a roving infield instructor in the Cubs organization. In 2003, he took over the managerial reins of the Saskatoon Legends of the Canadian Baseball League in mid-season from Ron LeFlore.

In 2006, Oliver was the bunting instructor for the Chicago White Sox organization.

== Personal life and death ==
Oliver was the son of Jim Oliver, Sr., who had played in the Negro leagues. James Oliver Field in St. Petersburg was named in the senior Oliver's memory, and was the first field to be refurbished under the Tampa Bay Devil Rays Field Renovation Programs. Oliver's brother, Jim, also played professional baseball.

Oliver's nickname was "Pee Wee."

Oliver was known for his singing voice and in retirement he sang the National Anthem at several baseball games. In 1990, having been invited to play in the Dodgers old-timer's game, we was called upon the sing "The Star-Spangled Banner," after the planned singer, Ella Fitzgerald, cancelled.

Oliver died on April 5, 2025, at the age of 84.
