= Phelbert Lawson =

American baseball player

- Pitcher
- Born: October 22, 1919; Washington, Virginia, U.S.
- Died: January 5, 2001 (aged 81); Canton, Ohio, U.S.

Negro league baseball debut
- 1945, for the Cleveland Buckeyes

Last appearance
- 1945, for the Cleveland Buckeyes

Teams
- Cleveland Buckeyes (1945)

Phelbert Russell Lawson (October 22, 1919 – January 5, 2001) was an American Negro league pitcher in the 1940s.

A native of Washington, Virginia, Lawson played for the Cleveland Buckeyes in 1945. He died in Canton, Ohio in 2001 at age 81.
