= Marshall Riddle =

- Infielder
- Born: April 22, 1918; Warren, Arkansas, U.S.
- Died: September 2, 1988 (aged 70); St. Louis, Missouri, U.S.
- Batted: Left Threw: Right

Negro league baseball debut
- 1937, for the St. Louis Stars

Last appearance
- 1943, for the Cleveland Buckeyes

Career statistics
- Batting average: .271
- Hits: 105
- Home runs: 1
- Runs batted in: 46
- Stolen bases: 10

Teams
- St. Louis Stars (1937); Indianapolis ABCs/St. Louis Stars/St. Louis–New Orleans Stars (1938–1941); Cleveland Buckeyes (1943)

Marshall Lewis "Jit" Riddle (April 22, 1918 – September 2, 1988) was an American professional baseball infielder in the Negro leagues. He played from 1937 to 1943, playing mostly with the St. Louis Stars .

== Career ==
Riddle made his Negro American League debut in 1937 for the St. Louis Stars. The following year, he began a four-year stint with the Indianapolis ABCs/St. Louis Stars/St. Louis–New Orleans Stars. Riddle was selected to the East-West All-Star Game in 1939 and 1940. His final Negro league season came in 1943 with the Cleveland Buckeyes. In 1951, he played for the Trois-Rivières Royals of the Provincial League.
