= Harry Barnes (baseball) =

American baseball player (1915-1993)

- Catcher
- Born: August 19, 1915; Highland Home, Alabama, U.S.
- Died: December 3, 1993 (aged 78); Birmingham, Alabama, U.S.
- Batted: Right Threw: Right

Negro league baseball debut
- 1937, for the Birmingham Black Barons

Last appearance
- 1948, for the Memphis Red Sox
- Stats at Baseball Reference

Teams
- Birmingham Black Barons (1937–1938, 1942); Atlanta Black Crackers (1944); Memphis Red Sox (1948)

Harry Wilson Barnes (August 19, 1915 – December 3, 1993), nicknamed "Mooch", was an American Negro league catcher in the 1930s and 1940s.

A native of Highland Home, Alabama, Barnes made his major league debut with the Birmingham Black Barons in 1937, and went on to play for the Atlanta Black Crackers and Memphis Red Sox. He died in Birmingham, Alabama in 1993 at age 78.
