= Eddie Klep =

First white American baseball player to play in the Negro Leagues

- Pitcher
- Born: October 12, 1918; Erie, Pennsylvania, U.S.
- Died: November 21, 1981 (aged 63); Los Angeles, California, U.S.
- Batted: Left Threw: Left

Negro league baseball debut
- May 29, 1946, for the Cleveland Buckeyes

Last appearance
- May 29, 1946, for the Cleveland Buckeyes
- Stats at Baseball Reference

Teams
- Cleveland Buckeyes (1946)

Edward Joseph Klep (October 12, 1918 – November 21, 1981) was an American professional baseball player who is most notable as the first white person to play in the Negro leagues. Born in Erie, Pennsylvania, he achieved the aforementioned distinction when he pitched three innings for the Cleveland Buckeyes on May 29, 1946, in a loss against the Chicago American Giants in Grand Rapids, Michigan.

Klep was featured on the cover and in a feature article in the Spring 2002 issue of Elysian Fields Quarterly.
