= Bill Reynolds (second baseman) =

American baseball player

- Second baseman
- Born: November 28, 1928; Stone Mountain, Georgia, U.S.
- Died: January 8, 1989 (aged 60); Mansfield, Ohio, U.S.
- Batted: Right Threw: Right

Negro league baseball debut
- 1948, for the Cleveland Buckeyes

Last appearance
- 1948, for the Cleveland Buckeyes

Teams
- Cleveland Buckeyes (1948)

William Edward Reynolds (November 28, 1928 – January 8, 1989), nicknamed "Bunk", was an American Negro league second baseman who played in the 1940s.

A native of Stone Mountain, Georgia, Reynolds attended Mansfield High School and played for the Cleveland Buckeyes in 1948. In 12 recorded games with the Buckeyes, he posted 8 hits and 5 RBI in 42 plate appearances. Reynolds died in Mansfield, Ohio in 1989 at age 60.
