= Frank Carswell (pitcher) =

American baseball player (1917–1978)

- Pitcher
- Born: August 9, 1917; Macon, Georgia, U.S.
- Died: October 23, 1978 (aged 61); Macon, Georgia, U.S.
- Batted: Right Threw: Right

debut
- 1945, for the Cleveland Buckeyes

Last appearance
- 1948, for the Cleveland Buckeyes
- Stats at Baseball Reference

Teams
- Cleveland Buckeyes (1944-1948)

Career highlights and awards
- Negro World Series champion (1945)

Frank Edwin Carswell Jr. (August 9, 1917 – October 23, 1978) was an American Negro league baseball pitcher. He played for the Cleveland Buckeyes between 1945 and 1948.

Carswell was the winning pitcher for the Buckeyes in the decisive Game 4 of the 1945 Negro World Series. He pitched a complete game shutout while allowing just four hits with three walks and a strikeout to outduel Ray Brown (a future member of the National Baseball Hall of Fame and Museum) and lead Cleveland to a sweep of the two-time defending champion Homestead Grays and win their first and only championship.
