= Ralph Wyatt =

American baseball player

- Infielder
- Born: September 17, 1917; Chicago, Illinois, U.S.
- Died: March 1, 1990 (aged 72); Auburn Park, Illinois, U.S.
- Batted: Right Threw: Right

debut
- 1941, for the Chicago American Giants

Last appearance
- 1946, for the Chicago American Giants

Negro league statistics
- Batting average: .255
- Home runs: 1
- Runs scored: 24

Teams
- Chicago American Giants (1941–1946); New York Black Yankees (1941); Homestead Grays (1943); Cleveland Buckeyes (1946)

Ralph Arthur Wyatt (September 17, 1917 – March 1990) was an American infielder in Negro league baseball. He played from 1941 to 1946.
