= Jim Oliver (baseball) =

American baseball player

- Shortstop
- Born: February 10, 1919
- Died: December 5, 1971 (aged 52); St. Petersburg, Florida, U.S.
- Batted: Right Threw: Right

Negro league baseball debut
- 1946, for the Cleveland Buckeyes

Last appearance
- 1946, for the Cleveland Buckeyes

Teams
- Cleveland Buckeyes (1946)

James Franklin Oliver Sr. (February 10, 1919 – December 5, 1971) was an American Negro league shortstop in the 1940s.

Oliver was the father of fellow major leaguer Nate Oliver. He played for the Cleveland Buckeyes in 1946, and also played for multiple barnstorming teams, and went on to play minor league baseball for the St. Petersburg Saints of the Florida State League in the 1950s. Oliver died in St. Petersburg, Florida in 1971, at the age of 52. Following his death, the baseball field at St. Petersburg's Campbell Park was named in his memory.
