= Nathaniel McClinic =

American baseball player

- Outfielder
- Born: April 26, 1924; Silver Creek, Georgia, U.S.
- Died: April 3, 2004 (aged 79); Rome, Georgia, U.S.
- Batted: Right Threw: Right

Negro league baseball debut
- 1946, for the Cleveland Buckeyes

Last appearance
- 1948, for the Cleveland Buckeyes

Teams
- Cleveland Buckeyes (1946–1948)

Nathaniel McClinic (April 26, 1924 – April 3, 2004) was an American Negro league outfielder for the Cleveland Buckeyes between 1946 and 1948.

A native of Silver Creek, Georgia, McClinic served in the US Army during World War II. He played three seasons for the Buckeyes, including their 1947 Negro American League championship club. After his baseball career, McClinic served as a police officer in Floyd County, Georgia. He died in Rome, Georgia in 2004 at age 79.
