= Willie Hubert =

American baseball player (1913–2000)

- Pitcher
- Born: January 19, 1913; Ocala, Florida, U.S.
- Died: May 19, 2000 (aged 87); Bronx, New York, U.S.
- Batted: Right Threw: Right

Negro league baseball debut
- 1939, for the Newark Eagles

Last appearance
- 1946, for the Philadelphia Stars
- Stats at Baseball Reference

Teams
- Newark Eagles (1939); Baltimore Elite Giants (1939–1940); Cincinnati Buckeyes (1942); Homestead Grays (1944); Cleveland Buckeyes (1946); Philadelphia Stars (1946)

William Henry Hubert (January 19, 1913 – May 19, 2000), nicknamed "Bubber", was an American Negro league pitcher between 1939 and 1946.

A native of Ocala, Florida, Hubert made his Negro leagues debut in 1939 with the Newark Eagles. In 1940, he and Ross Davis tossed a combined no-hitter for the Baltimore Elite Giants against Newark. In 1944, Hubert played for the Homestead Grays during the team's 1944 Negro World Series championship season. After his Negro leagues career, he played minor league baseball for the Farnham Pirates of the Provincial League in 1948. Hubert died in Bronx, New York in 2000 at age 87.
