= John Wesley Johnson Jr. =

American baseball player

- Outfielder
- Born: March 3, 1916; Jacksonville, Florida, U.S.
- Died: February 9, 1944 (aged 27); Cleveland, Ohio, U.S.

Negro league baseball debut
- 1943, for the Cleveland Buckeyes

Last appearance
- 1943, for the Cleveland Buckeyes

Teams
- Cleveland Buckeyes (1943)

John Wesley Johnson Jr. (March 3, 1916 – February 9, 1944) was an American Negro league outfielder in the 1940s.

A native of Jacksonville, Florida, Johnson played for the Cleveland Buckeyes in 1943. In ten recorded games, he posted three hits in 25 plate appearances. Johnson died in Cleveland, Ohio in 1944 at age 27.
