= Josh Johnson (catcher) =

American baseball player (1914-1999)

- Catcher
- Born: January 25, 1914; Evergreen, Alabama, U.S.
- Died: August 12, 1999 (aged 85); Springfield, Illinois, U.S.
- Batted: Right Threw: Right

Negro league baseball debut
- 1934, for the Homestead Grays

Last appearance
- 1940, for the Homestead Grays
- Stats at Baseball Reference

Teams
- Homestead Grays (1934–1935); New York Black Yankees (1935); Cincinnati Tigers (1936–1937); New York Black Yankees (1938); Homestead Grays (1940)

Joshua Johnson (January 25, 1914 – August 12, 1999), nicknamed "Brute", was an American Negro league catcher who played between 1934 and 1940.

A native of Evergreen, Alabama, Johnson attended Pennsylvania State College. He broke into the Negro leagues in 1934 with the Homestead Grays, and played for the Grays, the Cincinnati Tigers, and the New York Black Yankees. Johnson served in the US Army during World War II, and died in Springfield, Illinois in 1999 at age 85.
