= Ulysses Brown =

American baseball player (1920–1942)

- Catcher
- Born: 1920
- Died: September 7, 1942 (aged 21–22); Geneva, Ohio, U.S.
- Batted: Right Threw: Right

Negro league baseball debut
- 1937, for the Newark Eagles

Last appearance
- 1942, for the Cincinnati Clowns
- Stats at Baseball Reference

Teams
- Newark Eagles (1937–1938); Chicago American Giants (1940); Cincinnati Clowns (1942)

Ulysses "Joe" "Buster" Brown (1920 – September 7, 1942) was an American professional baseball catcher in the Negro leagues. He played from 1937 to 1942 with the Newark Eagles, Chicago American Giants, and the Cincinnati Clowns. Brown died in a car accident on September 7, 1942. Smoky Owens also died, while Eugene Bremmer, Herman Watts, Alonzo Boone, and Wilbur Hayes were also injured.
