= George Brown (1940s outfielder) =

Professional baseball player

- Outfielder

Negro league baseball debut
- 1942, for the Cincinnati Buckeyes

Last appearance
- 1942, for the Cincinnati Buckeyes
- Stats at Baseball Reference

Teams
- Cincinnati Buckeyes (1942)

George Brown, nicknamed "Tanna", was an American Negro league outfielder in the 1940s.

Brown made his Negro leagues debut in 1942 with the Cincinnati Buckeyes. In his only professional season, Brown recorded two hits in nine plate appearances over three games.
