= Sam Segraves =

American baseball player

- Outfielder
- Born: May 13, 1920; Bowling Green, Kentucky, U.S.
- Died: July 4, 1994 (aged 74); Indianapolis, Indiana, U.S.

Negro league baseball debut
- 1942, for the Cleveland Buckeyes

Last appearance
- 1943, for the Cincinnati Clowns

Teams
- Cleveland Buckeyes (1942); Memphis Red Sox (1942); Cincinnati Clowns (1943)

Samuel D. Segraves (May 13, 1920 – July 4, 1994) was an American Negro league outfielder in the 1940s.

A native of Bowling Green, Kentucky, Segraves was the younger brother of fellow-Negro leaguer J. C. Segraves. He made his Negro leagues debut in 1942 with the Cleveland Buckeyes and Memphis Red Sox, and played the following season for the Cincinnati Clowns. Segraves died in Indianapolis, Indiana in 1994 at age 74.
