= Walter Crosby =

American baseball player

- Catcher
- Born: May 5, 1921; Laurel, Mississippi, U.S.
- Died: September 13, 2006 (aged 85); Erie, Pennsylvania, U.S.
- Batted: Right Threw: Right

Negro league baseball debut
- 1944, for the Cleveland Buckeyes

Last appearance
- 1944, for the Cleveland Buckeyes

Teams
- Cleveland Buckeyes (1944)

Walter Charles Crosby Jr. (May 5, 1921 – September 13, 2006) was an American Negro league catcher in the 1940s.

A native of Laurel, Mississippi, Crosby served in the US Army during World War II and played for the Cleveland Buckeyes in 1944. He died in Erie, Pennsylvania, in 2006 at age 85.
