= J. C. Segraves =

American baseball player

- Outfielder
- Born: May 21, 1911; Bowling Green, Kentucky, U.S.
- Died: May 3, 1956 (aged 44); Indianapolis, Indiana, U.S.

Negro league baseball debut
- 1937, for the Indianapolis Athletics

Last appearance
- 1937, for the Indianapolis Athletics

Teams
- Indianapolis Athletics (1937)

John Claud Segraves Jr. (May 21, 1911 – May 3, 1956) was an American Negro league outfielder.

A native of Bowling Green, Kentucky, Segraves was the older brother of fellow-Negro leaguer Sam Segraves. He played for the Indianapolis Athletics in 1937. Segraves died in Indianapolis, Indiana in 1956 at age 44.
