= Clyde Williams (baseball) =

American baseball player

- Pitcher
- Born: April 9, 1920; Clarksdale, Mississippi, U.S.
- Died: June 5, 2005 (aged 85); Detroit, Michigan, U.S.
- Batted: Left Threw: Left

Negro league baseball debut
- 1947, for the Cleveland Buckeyes

Last appearance
- 1947, for the Cleveland Buckeyes

Teams
- Cleveland Buckeyes (1947)

Clyde Henry Williams (April 9, 1920 – June 5, 2005) was an American Negro league pitcher for the Cleveland Buckeyes in 1947.

A native of Clarksdale, Mississippi, Williams served as a military police officer during World War II, and played with the Buckeyes during their 1947 Negro American League championship season. He died in Detroit, Michigan in 2005 at age 85.
