= Rayford Finch =

American baseball player

- Pitcher
- Born: July 12, 1924; Glascock County, Georgia, U.S.
- Died: May 20, 1956 (aged 31)
- Threw: Left

Negro league baseball debut
- 1945, for the Cleveland Buckeyes

Last appearance
- 1945, for the Cleveland Buckeyes

NAL statistics
- Win–loss record: 0–0
- Earned run average: 4.50
- Strikeouts: 0

Teams
- Cleveland Buckeyes (1945)

Rayford Finch (July 12, 1924 – May 20, 1956) was an American Negro league pitcher in the 1940s.

A native of Glascock County, Georgia, Finch played for the Cleveland Buckeyes in 1945. He died in 1956 at age 31.
