= Raymond Taylor =

American baseball player (born 1910)

- Catcher
- Born: 1910; Memphis, Tennessee, U.S.
- Batted: Right Threw: Right

Negro league baseball debut
- 1931, for the Memphis Red Sox

Last appearance
- 1944, for the Kansas City Monarchs

Teams
- Memphis Red Sox (1931–1934, 1937–1938); Louisville Black Caps (1932); Kansas City Monarchs (1938, 1944); Indianapolis ABCs/St. Louis Stars/St. Louis–New Orleans Stars (1938-1941); Cleveland Buckeyes (1942–1943); Birmingham Black Barons (1944)

Raymond "Broadway" Taylor (born 1910) was an American professional baseball catcher in the Negro leagues. He played from 1931 to 1944, playing mostly with the Memphis Red Sox.
