= Sam Jethroe =

American baseball player (1917–2001)

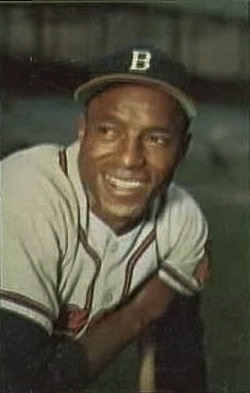
- Jethroe with the Boston Braves
- Center fielder
- Born: January 23, 1917; Columbus, Mississippi, U.S.
- Died: June 16, 2001 (aged 84); Erie, Pennsylvania, U.S.
- Batted: Both Threw: Right

Professional debut
- NgL: 1938, for the Indianapolis Clowns
- MLB: April 18, 1950, for the Boston Braves

Last MLB appearance
- April 15, 1954, for the Pittsburgh Pirates

MLB statistics
- Batting average: .277
- Home runs: 59
- Runs batted in: 282
- Stolen bases: 135
- Stats at Baseball Reference

Teams
- Negro leagues: Indianapolis ABCs (1938); Cleveland Buckeyes (1942–1948); Major League Baseball: Boston Braves (1950–1952); Pittsburgh Pirates (1954)

Career highlights and awards
- 5× East-West All-Star (1942, 1944–1947); Negro World Series Champion (1945); 2× Negro American League batting champion (1944, 1945); 3× NAL stolen bases leader; NL Rookie of the Year (1950); 2× NL stolen base leader (1950, 1951)

Samuel Jethroe (January 23, 1917 – June 16, 2001), nicknamed "the Jet", was an American center fielder in Negro league and Major League Baseball. With the Cincinnati & Cleveland Buckeyes he won a pair of batting titles, hit .340 over seven seasons from 1942 to 1948, and helped the team to two pennants and the 1945 Negro World Series title. He was named the National League's Rookie of the Year in 1950 with the Boston Braves, and led the NL in stolen bases in his first two seasons.

== Early life ==
Nicknamed "the Jet" for his stunning speed, Jethroe was born in Columbus, Mississippi but grew up in East St. Louis, Illinois. Until late in his life he was believed to have been born in 1922, but more recent sources have given the year as 1917 or 1918. A switch-hitter who threw right-handed, he played semipro ball in the St. Louis area after high school, and briefly appeared as a catcher for the Indianapolis ABCs in 1938.

== Negro league career ==
From 1942 to 1948 he played for the Buckeyes of the Negro American League, leading the league in stolen bases three times. He batted .487 in 39 at bats in his first season in 1942, a year in which a car hit several Buckeyes players on September 7 while they were standing next to their disabled bus at a roadside outside Geneva, Ohio; catcher Buster Brown and pitcher Smoky Owens were killed.

Jethroe received a physical deferment from military service in World War II. In 1943, he batted .291 while leading the league in both doubles (8) and triples (4). In 1944, he won his first batting title with a .353 average, and led the league with 14 doubles and 18 steals. On April 16, 1945, following pressure from a Boston city councilman, Jethroe was one of three black players to try out for the Boston Red Sox on the recommendation of black sportswriter Wendell Smith. After the tryout was observed by coaches Hugh Duffy and Larry Woodall, he was turned away along with Marvin Williams and Jackie Robinson, as the Red Sox had no plans to integrate their roster. Jethroe returned to the Buckeyes and won his second consecutive batting title with a .393 average, again leading the league with 10 triples and 21 stolen bases. The Buckeyes won the pennant under player-manager Quincy Trouppe with a 53–16 record, and swept the Homestead Grays – loaded with aging stars such as Cool Papa Bell, Buck Leonard and Jud Wilson – in the Negro World Series. Jethroe hit .333, and Cleveland's pitching dominated the Series as the Buckeyes outscored the Grays 15–3.

In 1946 Jethroe batted .310 and led the league in steals for the third straight year with 20. He batted .340 in 1947 as the Buckeyes took another pennant but lost the Negro World Series to the New York Cubans four games to one, although Jethroe hit .316. He was named to the East-West All-Star team five times (1942, 1944–47), and ended his Cleveland career with a .296 average in 1948.

== Major League career ==
Robinson broke baseball's color line with the Brooklyn Dodgers in 1947. Seeing Robinson's success, Dodgers general manager Branch Rickey acquired Jethroe's services from Cleveland for a reported $5,000. From 1948-49 he played for the Dodgers' Montreal Royals Triple A minor league team in the International League, batting .322 after joining the team late in 1948, and leading the league with 89 stolen bases in 1949 while scoring 154 runs. In October 1949, he was sold to the Boston Braves for $150,000.

On April 18, 1950, Jethroe became the first black player on the Boston Braves roster, and collected two hits including a home run. He was named Rookie of the Year that season at age 32 (although he was then believed to be 28) after hitting .273 with 100 runs, 18 home runs and 58 runs batted in; his 35 stolen bases topped the National League, and were the most by any Braves player since Hap Myers stole 57 in 1913. He remains the oldest player to have won Rookie of the Year honors. Jethroe enjoyed an almost identical but perhaps slightly improved season in 1951 when he posted better figures in batting (.280), runs (101), RBI (65), hits (160), doubles (29) and triples (10), and again hit 18 homers. He also repeated his 35 steals, once again to lead the league.

In 1952 he slumped badly, hitting .232, and reportedly had vision trouble; rumors were also circulating that he was older than his listed age. His career was also marked by difficulty in the outfield, as he led the NL in errors in each of his three full seasons, though he also led the league with 6 double plays as a rookie; his arm was not as accurate as those of most major league center fielders, and it was believed that he was playing too deep. In addition, he was among the NL's top four batters in strikeouts each year. On June 7 of his last year with the team, he hit the final grand slam in Boston Braves history before the club moved to Milwaukee.

Jethroe spent 1953 with the Triple-A Toledo Sox, hitting .307. Before the 1954 season he was one of six players acquired by the Pittsburgh Pirates in exchange for infielder Danny O'Connell, but Jethroe played only two games for the team, the last on April 15. After that, he spent the next five seasons with the Toronto Maple Leafs in the International League. Despite being among the league leaders in hits, runs and stolen bases during that period, his batting averages generally declined, and he never got another chance in the majors.

In a four-season major league career, he was a .261 hitter with 460 hits, 49 home runs, 280 runs, 181 RBI and 98 stolen bases in 442 games. He was called "the quickest human being I've ever seen" by former minor league teammate Don Newcombe.

== Later life ==
After his baseball career ended, Jethroe settled in Erie, Pennsylvania, where he worked in a local factory for several years, played in the city's semi-pro Glenwood League, then opened a bar. In 1994, Jethroe sued Major League Baseball in order to collect pension payments, as he was one of a host of other former Negro leaguers who couldn't qualify because of the racial discrimination of the 1940s and 1950s which delayed their professional careers. While the lawsuit was dismissed by a federal judge, in 1997 Major League Baseball decided to give a yearly payment plan to Negro league veterans, including Jethroe. He died of a heart attack in 2001 in Erie.

In 2019, the International League announced that Jethroe would be inducted into its hall of fame.

== See also ==
- 1949 Caribbean Series
- List of first black Major League Baseball players
- List of Negro league baseball players who played in Major League Baseball
- List of Major League Baseball annual stolen base leaders
