= Ross Davis (baseball) =

American baseball player

- Pitcher
- Born: July 28, 1918; Greenville, Mississippi, U.S.
- Died: January 1, 2013 (aged 94); Houston, Texas, U.S.
- Batted: Right Threw: Right

Negro league baseball debut
- 1940, for the Baltimore Elite Giants

Last appearance
- 1947, for the Cleveland Buckeyes
- Stats at Baseball Reference

Teams
- Baltimore Elite Giants (1940); Cleveland Buckeyes (1943, 1947)

Ross "Satchel" Davis (July 28, 1918 – January 1, 2013) was an American professional baseball pitcher in the Negro leagues. He played with the Baltimore Elite Giants in 1940, and with the Cleveland Buckeyes in 1943 and 1947. In 1940, he and Willie Hubert tossed a combined no-hitter for Baltimore against the Newark Eagles. Davis served in the United States Armed Forces during World War II.

In 1940, Davis appeared in two games for the Diablos Rojos del México of the Mexican League.
