= Marvin Price =

American baseball player

- First base
- Born: April 5, 1932; Chicago, Illinois, U.S.
- Died: July 21, 2013 (aged 81); Chicago, Illinois, U.S.

Teams
- Chicago American Giants (1946); Cleveland Buckeyes; Newark Eagles

Marvin D. Price (April 5, 1932 - July 21, 2013) was an American league baseball player. He was one of the youngest players in league history, suiting up for the Chicago American Giants at just 14 years old in 1946. He later played for the Cleveland Buckeyes and Newark Eagles from 1949 to 1952.

He later served in the Coast Guard and worked for the United States Postal Service.

He was born in, and died in, Chicago, Illinois. He was nicknamed "Thumper."
