= Jessie Williams =

Jessie Williams may refer to:

- Jessie Williams (actress), portrayer of Lily Kettle in Tracy Beaker Returns
- Jessie Williams (brothel-keeper) (fl. early 20th century), owner of the Chicken Ranch in Texas, US
- Jessie Williams (musician) (fl. 1899), co-composer of the musical An Arabian Girl and 40 Thieves; see List of musicals: A to L
- Jessie Wanda Williams or Chickie Williams (1919–2007), American country singer

== See also ==
- Jesse Williams (disambiguation)
- Jessica Williams (disambiguation)
