= Smoky Owens =

American baseball player (1912–1942)

- Pitcher/ Outfielder
- Born: 1912; Manning, South Carolina U.S.
- Died: September 7, 1942 (aged 29–30); Geneva, Ohio, U.S.
- Batted: Unknown Threw: Right

Negro league baseball debut
- 1939, for the Cleveland Bears

Last appearance
- 1942, for the Cincinnati Clowns

Teams
- Cleveland Bears (1939–1940); St. Louis Stars (1939–1940); Cincinnati Clowns (1941–1942)

Career highlights and awards
- Negro American League ERA leader (1942); Negro American League wins leader (1939)

Raymond "Smoky" Owens (1912 – September 7, 1942) was an American professional baseball pitcher and outfielder in the Negro leagues. He played from 1939 to 1942 with the Cleveland Bears, St. Louis Stars, and the Cincinnati Clowns. He was selected to the second 1939 East-West All-Star Game. Owens died in a car accident on September 7, 1942. Ulysses Brown also died, while Eugene Bremmer, Herman Watts, Alonzo Boone, and Wilbur Hayes were also injured.
