= Jeff Jefferson (baseball) =

American baseball player

- Pitcher
- Born: August 8, 1922; Bartow, Florida, U.S.
- Died: September 21, 1985 (aged 63); Erie, Pennsylvania, U.S.
- Batted: Right Threw: Right

debut
- 1944, for the Cleveland Buckeyes

Last appearance
- 1950, for the Cleveland Buckeyes

NAL statistics
- Win–loss record: 5–5
- Earned run average: 2.92
- Strikeouts: 43
- Stats at Baseball Reference

Teams
- Cleveland Buckeyes (1944–1945, 1947–1948)

Career highlights and awards
- 1945 Negro World Series champion

George Leo "Jeff" Jefferson (August 8, 1922 – September 21, 1985) was an American professional baseball pitcher in the Negro leagues. He played with the Jacksonville Red Caps in 1942 and 1943 and the Cleveland Buckeyes from 1944 to 1950. His brother, Bill Jefferson, also played Negro league baseball.
