= Butch Glass =

- Pitcher
- Born: February 26, 1898; Lexington, Kentucky, U.S.
- Died: October 19, 1972 (aged 74); Fayette County, Kentucky, U.S.
- Batted: Left Threw: Left

Negro league baseball debut
- 1923, for the Birmingham Black Barons

Last appearance
- 1930, for the Chicago American Giants
- Stats at Baseball Reference

Teams
- Birmingham Black Barons (1923); Memphis Red Sox (1923–1930); St. Louis Stars (1926); Kansas City Monarchs (1927); Louisville White Sox (1930); Chicago American Giants (1930)

Carl Lee "Butch" Glass (February 26, 1898 – October 19, 1972) was an American professional baseball pitcher in the Negro leagues. He played from 1923 to 1930 with several teams, playing mostly for the Memphis Red Sox.
