= Negro American Association =

The Negro American Association was the name of two different minor league Negro baseball leagues.

== Negro American Association (1939) ==
Negro American Association (I)
- Classification: Minor league
- Sport: Baseball
- Founded: 1939
- Ceased: 1939
- No. of teams: 6
- Country: United States

The first Negro American Association was organized in 1939, lasting one season. This league was to be a farm system for major league-caliber Negro league teams during the years of segregated baseball, but was not profitable.

=== Teams (1939) ===
- Camden Giants
- Richmond Hilldales
- Baltimore Black Sox
- Philadelphia Meteors
- Greensboro Redwings
- Winston-Salem Giants
- High Point (NC) Red Sox

== Negro American Association (1948–1949) ==
Negro American Association (II)
- Classification: Minor league
- Sport: Baseball
- Founded: 1948
- Ceased: 1949
- No. of teams: 12
- Country: United States

Another Negro American Association was organized in 1948, lasting two seasons. This league was formed after the integration of Major League Baseball and was meant to rival the existing Negro American League.

Included in the founding 12 teams were four established teams from the Negro Southern League (NSL), including the league's defending champion Asheville Blues, steadfast Atlanta Black Crackers, and another five teams from a new league, the Negro Carolina League (NCL).

After the collapse of the Negro National League (NNL) in 1948, the three-time Negro World Series champion Homestead Grays joined the league and crushed the competition. The league folded after the 1949 season.

=== Teams (1948–1949) ===
- Atlanta Black Crackers (1948) — from NSL
- Greensboro Goshen Red Wings (1948–1949) — from NCL
- Raleigh Tigers (1948–1949) — from NSL
- Richmond Giants (1948–1949) — from NCL
- Winston-Salem Pond Giants (1948–1949) — from NCL
- Asheville / Charlotte Blues (1948-1949) — from NSL
- Durham Eagles (1948-1949) — from NCL
- Jacksonville Eagles (1948) — from NSL (possible associate member in 1949)
- Norfolk-Newport News (1948-1949)
- Orangeburg, SC (1948)
- Baltimore Panthers (1948) — Dropped out before season end
- Danville All Stars (1948) — from NCL; Dropped out before season end
- Homestead Grays (1949) — from NNL

=== League champions ===
- 1948 Raleigh defeated Asheville 4g-2g
- 1949 Homestead overpowered the rest of the league in the 1st half, no 2nd half reported. Homestead defeated the Richmond Giants 4 games to 1 in a playoff series.
