= Jørgen Iversen =

Danish footballer (1918–1993)

Personal information
- Full name: Jørgen Iver Holm Iversen
- Date of birth: 1 May 1918
- Place of birth: Christianshavn, Denmark
- Date of death: 31 December 1993 (aged 75)
- Position: Forward

Senior career*
Years	Team	Apps	(Gls)
1936–1938	Esbjerg fB		
1938–1951	KB		

International career
1937–1940	Denmark	5	(1)
- * Club domestic league appearances and goals

Jørgen Iver Holm Iversen (1 May 1918 – 31 December 1993) was a Danish footballer who played as a forward for Esbjerg fB and KB. He made five appearances for the Denmark national team from 1937 to 1940.
