= Nina Lugovskaya =

Russian artist (1918–1993)

- Нина Серге́евна Луговская
- Born: Nina Sergeyevna Lugovskaya; December 25, 1918; Moscow, SFSR
- Died: December 27, 1993 (aged 75); Vladimir, Russia
- Education: Serpukhov Art School
- Occupation: Artist
- Spouse: Victor L. Templin

Nina Sergeyevna Lugovskaya (Russian: Нина Серге́евна Луговская; 25 December 1918 – 27 December 1993) was a Soviet painter and theatre designer, in addition to being a survivor of the Gulag. During Joseph Stalin's Great Purge, Lugovskaya was the author of a diary, which was discovered by the Soviet political police and used to convict her entire family of Anti-Soviet agitation. After surviving Kolyma, Lugovskaya studied at Serpukhov Art School and in 1977 joined the Union of Artists of the USSR. After the collapse of the Soviet Union, her diary was discovered intact inside the NKVD's file on her family. It was published in 2003, and resulted in Nina being called "the Anne Frank of Russia."

== Family and early life ==
Nina's parents were educated professionals. Her father, Sergei Rybin-Lugovskoi, was an economist and passionate supporter of the Socialist Revolutionary Party, while her mother, Lyubov Lugovskaya, was an educator. Nina had two older twin sisters, Olga and Yevgenia (also called Lyalya and Zhenya), born in 1915.

Sergei was first arrested in 1917, prior to the revolution, and after it held a government position, only to be arrested and exiled again in 1919. After three years, he returned and the family located to Moscow where he ran a bakery cooperative, employing 400 people. After economic nationalization in 1928, the business was closed, and Sergei was arrested and exiled again to a town north of Moscow. This is where Nina began writing her diaries. In 1935 Sergei was arrested and imprisoned in Moscow, where Nina visited him shortly before his exile to Kazakhstan.

Although she had many friends, Nina suffered from depression, and repeatedly confided her suicidal fantasies to her diary. Nina further suffered from lazy eye, which made her very self-conscious. In her diary, she often confided her hatred for Stalin and the Communist Party of the Soviet Union. These beliefs came from witnessing the NKVD's repeated harassment and internal exile of her father, who had been a NEPman during the 1920s.

== Arrest ==
On January 4, 1937, Nina's diary was confiscated during an NKVD raid on the Lugovskoy's apartment. Passages underlined for prosecutorial use included Nina's suicidal thoughts, her complaints about Communist indoctrination by her teachers, her loyalty to her persecuted father, and her often-expressed hopes that someone would assassinate Joseph Stalin.

Based on the "evidence" in her diary, Nina, her mother and her two sisters were arrested and sentenced to five years' hard labor in the Kolyma prison camps of the Soviet Arctic. After serving her sentence, she was released in 1942 and served the next seven years in exile in a remote area of Kolyma. Nina's mother and sisters survived Kolyma. Lyubov died in 1949, and her father in the 1950s.

== Marriage, Career and Death ==
In Magadan, Nina married Victor L. Templin, an artist and fellow survivor of the GULAG. She worked as an artist in theaters at Magadan, Sterlitamak, in the Perm region. While decorating the Magadan theater, Nina met with painter Vasili Shukhayev, and began to consider herself his pupil.

After 1957, Viktor and Nina lived in Vladimir, Russia. She was formally rehabilitated in 1963 after sending a personal appeal to Nikita Khrushchev, who overturned her conviction, citing "unproven accusations". She became a member of the Soviet Union of Artists in 1977 and held several solo exhibitions during the 1970s and 1980s, where her paintings were featured prominently in several buildings and the public library. Those who knew Nina and Viktor in their later years were unaware of their experiences in the GULAG. Both of them lived to witness the collapse of the Soviet Union in 1991.

Nina Templina died on 27 December 1993 and was buried in the Ulybyshevo cemetery near Vladimir.

== Diary ==
After Nina's death, her diary was found in Soviet archives by Irina Osipova, an activist with the human rights organisation Memorial. At the time, Osipova was conducting research into opposition to Stalinism and uprisings in the GULAG. Deeply impressed by the diary, Osipova decided to publish it.

In 2003, the Moscow-based publisher Glas first printed an abridged version of Nina's diary in English as The Diary of a Soviet Schoolgirl. In 2007, Houghton Mifflin published a new translation by Andrew Bromfield. It was titled, I Want to Live: The Diary of a Young Girl in Stalin's Russia. All passages underlined by the NKVD were printed in bold type.

Throughout her diaries Nina showed contempt for the Bolsheviks, writing "These bloody Bolsheviks! How I hate them! All hypocrites, liars, and scoundrels", "I could feel my fury with the Bolsheviks rising in my throat, my despair at my own powerlessness", "These lousy Bolsheviks! They don't think about us young people at all, they don't think about the fact we are human beings too"! In one passage she recounted "sixty-nine White Guards were arrested and shot in Leningrad without any investigation or trial".

Her diaries reflect a nationalist patriotism, in which she wrote about the SS Chelyuskin incident: "wanted to cry for happiness and sympathy with these great heroes...to participate in the general celebration". On her country she wrote: "How can it be? Great Russia and the great Russian people have fallen into the hands of a scoundrel. Is it possible? That Russia, which for so many years fought for freedom and which finally attained it, that Russia has suddenly enslaved itself."
