= Willie Grace =

American baseball player

- Outfielder / Pitcher
- Born: June 30, 1917; Memphis, Tennessee, U.S.
- Died: November 18, 2006 (aged 89); Erie, Pennsylvania, U.S.
- Batted: Right Threw: Right

Negro league baseball debut
- 1943, for the Cleveland Buckeyes

Last appearance
- 1948, for the Cleveland Buckeyes
- Stats at Baseball Reference

Teams
- Cleveland Buckeyes (1943–1948)

William Grace (June 30, 1917 – November 18, 2006) was an American Negro league baseball outfielder and pitcher. He played from 1943 to 1948 with the Cleveland Buckeyes. He also played for the Erie Sailors of the Middle Atlantic League in 1951.
