= Marlin Carter =

- Infielder
- Born: December 27, 1912; Haslam, Texas, U.S.
- Died: December 20, 1993 (aged 80); Memphis, Tennessee, U.S.
- Batted: Left Threw: Right

Negro league baseball debut
- 1932, for the Memphis Red Sox

Last appearance
- 1951, for the Chicago American Giants
- Stats at Baseball Reference

Teams
- San Antonio Black Indians (1931); Monroe Monarchs (1932–1933); Memphis Red Sox (1933–1934, 1938–1942, 1946–1948); Cincinnati Tigers (1935–1937); Chicago American Giants (1948)

Career highlights and awards
- All-Star (1942)

Marlin Theodore "Pee Wee" Carter (December 27, 1912 – December 20, 1993) was an American professional baseball infielder in the Negro leagues. Carter played from 1932 to 1951 with the Memphis Red Sox, Cincinnati Tigers, and the Chicago American Giants and appeared in the East-West All-Star Game in 1942. Carter served in the U.S. Coast Guard from 1943 to 1945.
