= Johnnie Cowan =

American baseball player

- Infielder
- Born: May 31, 1913; Pleasant Hill, Alabama, U.S.
- Died: October 24, 1993 (aged 80); Birmingham, Alabama, U.S.
- Batted: Right Threw: Right

debut
- 1934, for the Birmingham Black Barons

Last appearance
- 1948, for the Memphis Red Sox

Career statistics
- Batting average: .265
- Stats at Baseball Reference

Teams
- Birmingham Black Barons (1934); Cincinnati/Cleveland Buckeyes (1942); Cleveland Buckeyes (1944–1947); Memphis Red Sox (1948)

Career highlights and awards
- Negro League World Series champion (1945)

Johnnie Cowan (May 31, 1913 – October 24, 1993) was an American infielder in Negro league baseball. He played between 1934 and 1948.
