= Jesse F. Williams =

American baseball player

Jesse Williams
- Catcher
- Batted: Left Threw: Right

Negro league baseball debut
- 1944, for the Cleveland Buckeyes

Last appearance
- 1947, for the Cleveland Buckeyes

Teams
- Cleveland Buckeyes (1944, 1947)

Jesse F. Williams (fl. 1944–1947) was an American Negro league catcher in the 1940s.

== Career ==
Williams made his Negro leagues debut in 1944 with the Cleveland Buckeyes and also played with the team in 1947.
