= Alan E. Zimmer =

American neuroradiologist

Alan Edward Zimmer (10 February 1929 – 10 December 1993) was an American neuroradiologist, specializing in duplex neurovascular and magnetic resonance imaging (MRI).

== Early life and education and career ==
Born in New York City, Zimmer received his M.D. degree in 1956 from the University of Geneva Faculty of Medicine, Switzerland, where he was valedictorian of his class, and served an internship at Garfield Memorial Hospital, Washington, D.C. After a residency in radiology at Bronx Municipal Hospital in New York City, Zimmer accepted a fellowship in neuroradiology at Albert Einstein College of Medicine.

== Career ==
After serving as an instructor at Albert Einstein, Zimmer later became an assistant professor. While at Albert Einstein, Zimmer was one of the early lecturers in the United States invited to share his expertise in the "Stockholm School" of neuroradiology; rapidly leading the earliest advancements in the field, Stockholm's Serafimer Hospital had become a "mecca" of neuroradiology throughout the 1940s and '50s. Zimmer and colleagues from Albert Einstein visited Serafimer to become trained in the technique and subsequently spread the methodology to radiologists across the United States. Zimmer joined the staff of Yale University School of Medicine in New Haven, Connecticut, teaching there until 1981.

In the 1960s, Zimmer helped bring early neuroradiology methological advancements developed in Sweden to radiologists in the United States. He also conducted early research related to the emerging technologies of computer axial tomography (CT, or CAT) and MRI as these procedures began to revolutionize radiology in the 1970s and '80s. As New Jersey’s senior neuroradiologist, Zimmer was consulted frequently by physicians, hospitals, and the courts to help diagnosis injuries and disease related to the head, neck, and spine. Zimmer was chief of neuroradiology at the University of Medicine and Dentistry of New Jersey (UMDNJ) from 1983 until his death.

Zimmer was selected as a special fellow for the National Institute of Neurological Diseases and Blindness, New York, and later as a visiting fellow at the Cleveland Clinic in Ohio. He was associate professor of radiology at Temple University School of Medicine in Philadelphia until 1983, when he joined UMDNJ.

== Personal life ==
In 1961, Zimmer married Harriet Hochhauser; the couple had three sons: Michael Zimmer, M.D., David Zimmer, M.D., and Stuart Zimmer, CEO and founder of Zimmer Partners LP and chairman of the insurance company Ategrity. Following a $100m donation from the Zimmer Family Foundation, the Harvard University Science Center was renamed Zimmer Hall.

== Research and publications ==
Early in his career, Zimmer focused his research on investigating treatments for serious conditions in the brain and central nervous system. In 1971, at a course during his fellowship at Albert Einstein, Zimmer was first introduced to a new "computed tomographic" (CT) system by its developer, the British engineer Godfrey Hounsfield, who was making his first visit to the United States. This was the first demonstration of the CT technique to American radiologists, who were commonly using angiography for diagnostic imaging. Testing showed that the diagnostic error rate of CT was half that of angiography, but an even greater potential value was seen in CT's ability to detect unsuspected conditions. For the first time, physicians could visualize not just bone, but organs, tissue, and other soft material in the body. Hounsfield would later receive the Nobel Prize for his technique.

After his introduction to CT, Zimmer began a career specializing in emerging neuroradiological advances. As hospitals began to adopt CT scanning, Zimmer was one of the early physicians conducting research on its applications. Similarly, when magnetic resonance imaging was introduced in the 1980s, Zimmer was an early practitioner and contributor to MRI research.

Throughout the 1960s, '70s, and '80s, Zimmer published numerous articles around the cerebral venous system and other aspects of neuroradiology. His article, “The Septal Vein," co-authored with George P. Annes, was published in the journal of the Radiological Society of North America (RSNA) in 1966. Their work describes the significance of the septal vein in identifying the nature and presence of tumors, or abscesses, in the frontal lobe (or anterior cranial fossa).

Zimmer also contributed “Radiologic Imaging of the Cervical Spine” as a chapter to a core clinical resource book on the diagnosis and nonsurgical treatment of neck injuries, such as whiplash: Painful Cervical Trauma: Diagnosis and Rehabilitative Treatment of Neuromusculoskeletal Injuries, edited by C. David Tollison and John R. Satterthwaite and published in 1992.
