= Jesse Williams (footballer, born 1903) =

Welsh footballer

Personal information
- Full name: Jesse Thomas Williams
- Date of birth: 24 June 1903
- Place of birth: Cefn-y-bedd, Wales
- Date of death: 20 October 1972 (aged 69)
- Position: Forward

Senior career*
Years	Team	Apps	(Gls)
1919–1920	Caergwrle		
1920–1923	Oak Alyn Rovers		
1923–1924	Wrexham	35	(3)
1924–1927	Middlesbrough	37	(12)
1927–1929	Clapton Orient	33	(3)
1929–1930	Rhyl Athletic		
1930–1931	Ashton National		
1931–1932	Shrewsbury Town		
1932–1933	Wellington Town		
1933–1934	Colwyn Bay United		

International career
1925	Wales	1	(0)
- * Club domestic league appearances and goals

Jesse Thomas Williams (24 June 1903 – 20 October 1972) was a Welsh international footballer. He was part of the Wales national football team, playing 1 match on 18 April 1925 against Ireland.

He also made appearances in the Football League for Wrexham, Middlesbrough and Clapton Orient.

== See also ==
- List of Wales international footballers (alphabetical)
