= Jessica Williams =

Jessica Williams may refer to:

== People ==
- Jessica Williams (actress) (born 1989), American actress, comedian, and correspondent
- Punkie Johnson (Jessica Williams, born 1985), American comedian and actress
- Jessica Williams (musician) (1948–2022), American jazz pianist and composer
- Jessica Williams (footballer), South African soccer player
- Jessica Williams, lead singer of 1980s disco funk group Arpeggio, produced by Simon Soussan

== Characters ==
- Jessica Williams, a fictional character in the 1973 film Satan's School for Girls
- Jessica Williams, a fictional character in Jericho, a 2006 TV series
- Jessica Williams, a fictional character in the animated TV series Craig of the Creek and its spinoff series Jessica's Big Little World

== See also ==
- Jessie Williams (disambiguation)
