= Negro Southern League (1945–1951) =

- Classification: Minor league
- Sport: Negro league baseball
- Founded: 1945
- Folded: 1951
- Country: United States

The second Negro Southern League (NSL) was one of the several Negro baseball leagues created during the time organized baseball was segregated. The NSL was organized as a minor league in 1945 and lasted until 1951.

== League history ==
Nine team owners met in February 1945 in Nashville, Tennessee, to form a new minor league named after an old minor league.

The 1948 season received very little coverage in the press and is hard to piece together. Additionally, a new league, the Negro American Association, formed and lured away at least four of the stronger teams, including the Atlanta Black Crackers.

The league did not organize for the 1952 season due to attendance figures being expected to be too low to be profitable. The second Negro Southern League was dissolved after seven seasons.

== Negro Southern League franchises ==
Negro Southern League (1945–51)
Team	Years in league	Notes
Atlanta Black Crackers	1945, 1947–48	• Associate team 1946 • Left for Negro American Association
Knoxville Grays	1945	
Asheville Blues	1945–47	• Left for Negro American Association
Nashville Cubs	1945–51	• Called Black Vols 1945-46 • Called Louisville-Nashville Cubs 1950
New Orleans Black Pelicans	1945	• Only played first half of season
Richmond Cardinals	1945	• Replaced New Orleans for second half of season
Chattanooga Choo Choos	1945–48, 1950	• Called Black Choo Choos 1947, 50 • Dropped out mid-season 1950
Mobile Black Bears	1945–46	
Little Rock Black Travelers	1945	• Also called Greys • Dropped out mid-season
Indianapolis Cardinals	1945	• Replaced Little Rock for second half of season
Charlotte Black Hornets	1946	
Jacksonville Eagles	1946–47	• Left for Negro American Association
Knoxville Giants	1946	
Montgomery Dodgers	1946	• Also called Red Sox
Memphis Blues	1947–48	
New Orleans Creoles	1947–48, 1950–51	
Raleigh Tigers	1947	• Left for Negro American Association
Birmingham Clowns	1947	• Also called All Stars
Memphis Cardinals	1947	
Raleigh Grays	1948	• Associate team only
Mobile Black Bears	1948	• Associate team only
Atlanta Brown Crackers	1949–50	• Called Atlanta-Detroit Brown Crackers 1949
Gadsden Tigers	1949–50	• Called Gadsden-Florida Tigers 1949
Mobile Black Shippers	1949	
Montgomery Tigers	1949	
Pensacola Seagulls	1949	
Evansville Dodgers	1949	• Associate team only
Indianapolis ABCs	1949	• Associate team only • Possibly related to Atlanta Black Crackers
Greenville Delta Giants	1950	
Memphis Red Caps	1950	
Nashville Stars	1950–51	
Owensboro Braves	1950	• Dropped out mid-season
Atlanta Braves	1951	
Birmingham Black Eagles	1951	• Also called Bears
Birmingham All -Stars	1951	
Chattanooga Stars	1951	
Jackson Cubs	1951	
Knoxville Packers	1951	

- Note: An "associate team" is one who is not a member of the league, but games played against them by league teams count in the league standings.

== League champions ==
Most seasons were split in halves, with the winner of the first half of the season playing the winner of the second half of the season in a formal league play-off that decided the Pennant winner. For some years it is unclear if a split season was played and if the second half schedule was completed. In the below list, the first half winner is noted with a raised "1" and the second half winner is noted with a raised "2".

- 1945 Atlanta Black Crackers
- 1946 Asheville Blues (won both halves)
- 1947 Asheville^{1} defeated New Orleans Creoles^{2}, 3g-2g
- 1948 New Orleans Creoles (won both halves, reportedly)
- 1949 Gadsden-Florida Tigers^{1} / Nashville Cubs^{2}, no play-off reported
- 1950 undetermined
- 1951 undetermined
