= Ferenc Kropacsek =

Hungarian footballer

Personal information
- Date of birth: 7 September 1899
- Place of birth: Budapest, Austria-Hungary
- Date of death: 22 December 1993 (aged 94)
- Place of death: Budapest, Hungary

International career
Years	Team	Apps	(Gls)
1924	Hungary	2	(0)

Ferenc Kropacsek (7 September 1899 – 22 December 1993) was a Hungarian footballer. He played in two matches for the Hungary national football team in 1924. He was also part of Hungary's squad for the football tournament at the 1924 Summer Olympics, but he did not play in any matches.
