= Les Jones (footballer, born 1905) =

Australian rules footballer

Personal information
- Full name: Leslie Jones
- Born: 25 March 1905; Foster, Victoria
- Died: 5 December 1993 (aged 88)
- Original team: Foster
- Height: 183 cm (6 ft 0 in)
- Weight: 90 kg (198 lb)

Playing career^{1}
Years	Club	Games (Goals)
1929	Hawthorn	5 (0)
- ^{1} Playing statistics correct to the end of 1929.

Leslie Jones (25 March 1905 – 5 December 1993) was an Australian rules footballer who played with Hawthorn in the Victorian Football League (VFL).

Jones, who was from Foster, made five appearances for Hawthorn in the 1929 VFL season.
