= Mobile Black Bears =

The Mobile Black Bears, also known as the Mobile Black Shippers, was a semi-professional baseball team composed entirely of African-American players. The team, which played during the mid-20th century, was based in Mobile, Alabama, and also went on barnstorming tours.

Henry "Hank" Aaron played for the Mobile Black Bears in 1951 while he was still in high school, earning US$3 per game ($35 in 2024, accounting inflation). Aaron was only allowed to play at home games and only on Sundays. Hall-of-Famer Billy Williams had a brother who also played on this team.
