= Jesse Williams (outfielder) =

American baseball player (1923-1996)

- Outfielder
- Born: February 5, 1923; Meridian, Mississippi, U.S.
- Died: January 31, 1996 (aged 72); Chicago, Illinois, U.S.
- Batted: Left Threw: Right

Negro league baseball debut
- 1944, for the Cleveland Buckeyes

Last appearance
- 1947, for the Cleveland Buckeyes

Teams
- Cleveland Buckeyes (1944-1945, 1947); Chicago American Giants (1945)

Jesse Sheron Williams (February 5, 1923 – January 31, 1996) was an American Negro league outfielder and catcher in the 1940s.

A native of Meridian, Mississippi, Williams made his Negro leagues debut in 1944 with the Cleveland Buckeyes. He played with Cleveland in 1945 and 1947 and also played with the Chicago American Giants in 1947/ Williams died in Chicago, Illinois in 1996 at age 72.
