= Memphis Blues (Negro Southern League) =

Information
- League: Negro Southern League
- Location: Memphis, Tennessee
- Established: 1947

The Memphis Blues were a Negro league baseball team from Memphis, Tennessee, that played in the minor league Negro Southern League in 1947.
