= Archie Ware =

American baseball player

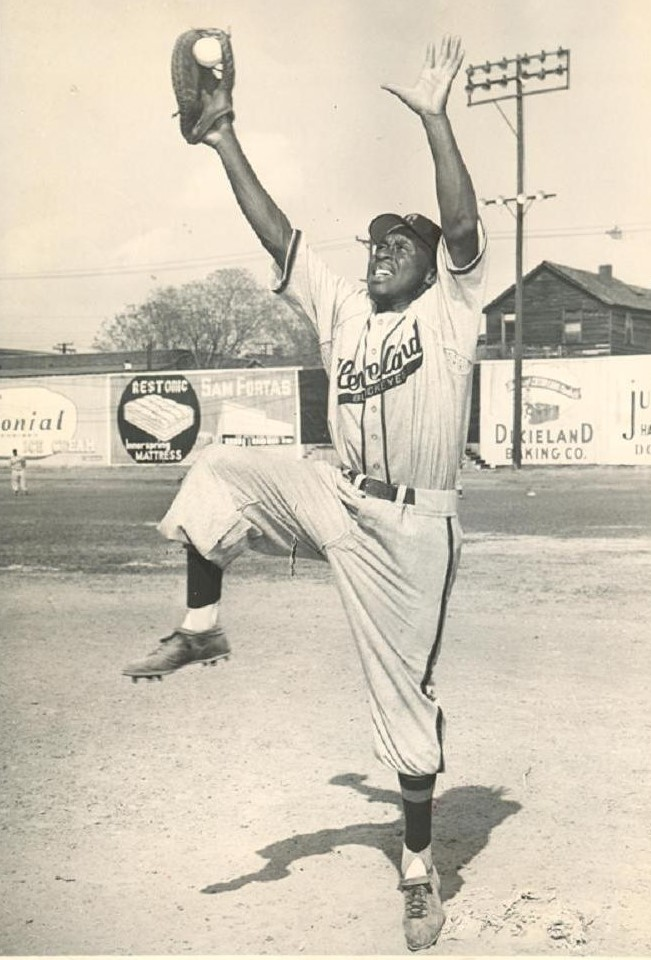
- First baseman
- Born: June 19, 1918; Greenville, Florida, U.S.
- Died: December 13, 1990 (aged 72); Los Angeles, California, U.S.
- Batted: Left Threw: Left

debut
- 1942, for the Cincinnati/Cleveland Buckeyes

Last appearance
- 1952, for the Lewiston Broncs

Career statistics
- Batting average: .288
- Hits: 159
- Home runs: 2
- Runs batted in: 81
- Stolen bases: 10

Teams
- Cincinnati/Cleveland Buckeyes (1942); Cleveland Buckeyes (1943–1948); Farnham Pirates (1951); Lewiston Broncs (1952)

Career highlights and awards
- 4× All-Star (1944–1946); Negro League World Series champion (1945)

Archie Virgil Ware (June 19, 1918 – December 13, 1990) was an American first baseman in Negro league baseball. He played between 1942 and 1952.

In between, Ware played winter ball in Venezuela with the Navegantes del Magallanes club in the 1947–48 season, and for the Spur Cola Colonites of Panama in 1950–51, playing for Spur Cola in the 1951 Caribbean Series.
