= Ansley, Louisiana =

Unincorporated community in Louisiana, U.S.

Coordinates: 32°23′45″N 92°41′35″W

Ansley is an unincorporated community in Jackson Parish, Louisiana, United States.

== History ==
Ansley was the home of the Davis Brothers Lumber company. The town was settled by the Davis Brothers and their employees in the later part of the year 1901, before the town was established here, a dense forest of yellow pine, black gum, red gum, oak, and hickory were in evidence. These men are pioneers of the lumber industry, having begun their career as lumber men in Nevada County, Arkansas, when they were mere boys. In 1881, the company was incorporated and chartered in the year of 1902. The pine mill began operation on December 17, 1902. The Davis Brother Lumber Company continued operating until 1957 when the mill was closed. The Post Office, located at the back of the company's. office was closed December 3, 1965.
