= Atlanta Black Crackers (1943–1949) =

Information
- League: Independent (1943–1944); Negro Southern League (II) (1945–1947); Negro American Association (1948–1949)
- Location: Atlanta, Georgia
- Ballpark: Ponce de Leon Park (1943–1949)
- Established: 1943
- Disbanded: 1949
- League titles: 1945

The Atlanta Black Crackers were a professional Negro league baseball team which played during the mid-20th century. They were a minor Negro league team and were named after the original Atlanta Black Crackers.

== Beginnings ==
In 1943, four years after the original Black Crackers ceased operations, a new team formed to determine if the Atlanta area could support a profitable black team. John H. Harden, the owner at the time the original Black Crackers disbanded, was again financing the team. After two financially successful years barnstorming, Atlanta returned to league play in the newly rebooted Negro Southern League.

== League play ==
=== United States League ===
Owner John Harden represented the Black Crackers at the meeting that founded the United States League in January 1945. By the time the season began however, the Black Crackers had moved to the rebooted Negro Southern League.

=== Negro Southern League ===
After decades of mediocrity, Atlanta finally had an undisputed league championship. The Black Crackers dominated play in 1945 and won both halves of the Negro Southern League (NSL) season making any play-off unnecessary.

Even after winning the NSL Pennant in 1945, the Black Crackers were still struggling financially. For the 1946 season, they split their time between barnstorming and playing league games as an associate team. Being an associate team allowed games played against NSL teams to count for the league team in the standings, without requiring the associate team to play a committed schedule, while still being able to play non-league games.

New owners in 1947 put them back as full league members without much success. By now, Jackie Robinson had broken the Major League Baseball color line and interest in Negro league games waned dramatically. The Black Crackers were slated to play the 1948 season in the NSL, but no season appears to have been played. Instead, Atlanta left to compete in the newly formed Negro American Association.

=== Negro American Association ===
In 1948, the newly formed Negro American Association (NAA) invited several NSL teams to abscond. The Atlanta Black Crackers accepted the offer to replace the Danville Aces, who had dropped out. However, it soon turned unprofitable and Atlanta continued to also play an independent schedule. The same proved true for the 1949 season, and the Atlanta Black Crackers quietly disappeared.
