= Chattanooga Choo-Choos =

Information
- League: Negro Southern League (1940-1946)
- Location: Chattanooga, Tennessee
- Established: 1940
- Disbanded: 1946

The Chattanooga Choo-Choos were a minor league Negro league baseball team based in Chattanooga, Tennessee. The team was a member of the Negro Southern League, which was considered a minor league for the duration of the Choo-Choos' affiliation, and fielded a team from 1940 until 1946. The Choo-Choos played their home games at Engel Stadium. The team is noted as the first professional baseball organization for which Hall of Famer Willie Mays played.

The Chattanooga chapter of the Society for American Baseball Research is named in honor of the team.
