= Wilbur Hayes =

American sports executive

Wilbur Hayes (August 25, 1898 – February 9, 1957) was an American sports executive. He owned the Cleveland Buckeyes Negro league baseball franchise from 1942 to 1950. Hayes survived a car accident in 1942.
