= Avelino Cañizares =

Cuban baseball player (born 1919)

- Shortstop
- Born: November 10, 1919; Havana, Cuba
- Died: December 13, 1993 (aged 74); Mexico City, Mexico
- Batted: Right Threw: Right

debut
- 1944, for the Alijadores de Tampico

Last appearance
- 1964, for the Sultanes de Saltillo
- Stats at Baseball Reference

Teams
- Alijadores de Tampico (1944); Cleveland Buckeyes (1945); Algodoneros de Torreón (1946); Tuneros de San Luis Potosí (1947–1948); Industriales de Monterrey (1948); Sherbrooke Athletics (1950); Keokuk Kernals (1952); Diablos Rojos del México (1954); México Azul (1954); Águilas de Mexicali (1957–1958); Sultanes de Saltillo (1964)

Career highlights and awards
- Negro League World Series champion (1945)

Avelino Cañizares Martínez (November 10, 1919 – December 13, 1993) was a Cuban professional baseball shortstop. He played between 1944 and 1964 in the Negro leagues and the Mexican League.
