= Cincinnati Tigers =

Negro league baseball team based in Ohio

Information
- League: Negro Southern League (1934-1936); Negro American League (1937)
- Location: Cincinnati, Ohio
- Ballpark: Crosley Field
- Established: 1934
- Disbanded: 1937

The Cincinnati Tigers were a professional Negro league baseball team that was based in Cincinnati, Ohio.

== Founding ==
The club was founded in 1934 by DeHart Hubbard, who was the first African American to win an individual Olympic gold medal when he won the long jump during the 1924 Summer Olympics. Dizzy Dismukes was named as the club's first manager as they entered the integrated Indiana-Ohio League. In addition, Carl Glass also served time as the club's manager during their first season.

== Negro Southern League ==
In addition to membership in the Indiana-Ohio League, the Tigers were also members of the Negro Southern League, though by the second half of the season, they disappeared from the standings. After a brief hiatus, the Tigers rejoined the NSL again in 1936, credited with a 3-0 record in league play but reporting significantly fewer games than the rest of the league.

== Negro American League ==
The Tigers joined the new Negro American League as charter members in 1937, which elevated the club to major league status. In its lone season as a major league team, the Tigers finished the season second in the league's overall standings. Five Tigers players were named to the West team in the East-West All-Star game, including Ted Radcliffe, Howard Easterling, Ducky Davenport, Porter Moss, and Rainey Bibbs.

During their run, the Cincinnati Reds furnished the Tigers with their older uniforms and, like the Reds, the team played at Crosley Field. The club folded after the 1937 season.

== Notable players ==
- Marlin Carter
- Lloyd Davenport
- Dizzy Dismukes
- Carl Glass
- Ted Radcliffe
- Josh Johnson (catcher)
- Porter Moss
- Roy Partlow
- Joe Lillard
- Neil Robinson

== See also ==
Category:Cincinnati Tigers (baseball) players
