= Cleveland Buckeyes =

Negro League Baseball team (1942–1948)

- Logo

Information
- League: Negro American League
- Location: Cleveland, Ohio
- Ballpark: Crosley Field (1942); League Park (1942-1948, 1950); Parkway Field (1949)
- Established: 1942
- Disbanded: 1950
- Nicknames: Cincinnati–Cleveland Buckeyes (1942); Cleveland Buckeyes (1943-1948); Louisville Buckeyes (1949); Cleveland Buckeyes (1950)
- Negro World Series championships: 1945
- League titles: 1945; 1947

The Cleveland Buckeyes were a Negro league baseball team that played from 1942 to 1950 in the Negro American League. The Buckeyes played in two Negro World Series, defeating the Washington Homestead Grays in 1945, and losing to the New York Cubans in 1947. They were based in Cincinnati for their first season and Louisville for their second-to-last season.

== Founding ==
The Buckeyes were established in 1942 as the Buckeyes Baseball Club, established initially in Cincinnati, Ohio (Ohio being the Buckeye State), scheduling seven league games in Cincinnati and nine in Cleveland, plus another five in Meadville, Pennsylvania. The following season, owner Ernest White of Erie made Cleveland the team's home city, where they played their games at League Park.

== Glory years ==
While in Cleveland, the team achieved great success, including winning a pair of Negro American League championships (1945, 1947) and a Negro League World Series title in 1945.

== Decline and demise ==
In 1949 the team moved again, to Louisville, Kentucky, but it was to no avail and the Louisville Buckeyes returned to Cleveland for the first two months of the 1950 season before disbanding.

== Home fields ==
The Buckeyes played their inaugural season's home games at Crosley Field in Cincinnati. After one season, they moved upstate to Cleveland and played at League Park until their demise, except for 1949 when they played at Parkway Field in Louisville, Kentucky.

== MLB throwback jerseys ==
On May 20, 2006, in Cleveland, the Pittsburgh Pirates and Cleveland Indians honored the Negro league teams by wearing the uniforms of the Homestead Grays and the Cleveland Buckeyes, respectively, during an inter-league game, as well as displaying the names on the scoreboard. The Pirates won the game 9–6.

On April 25, 2015, in Detroit, the Cleveland Indians and Detroit Tigers wore the uniforms of the Cleveland Buckeyes and Detroit Stars, respectively. Players' names were not displayed on the jerseys. Detroit won the game 4–1.

On May 7, 2017, in Kansas City, the Cleveland Indians and Kansas City Royals wore the uniforms of the Cleveland Buckeyes and Kansas City Monarchs, respectively. Players' names were not displayed on the jerseys. Cleveland won the game 1–0.
