= New York Cubans all-time roster =

The following is the list of players on the New York Cubans all-time roster. These are New York Cubans players who appeared in at least one game for the Cubans while they were based in Paterson, New Jersey or New York City from 1935 to 1936 and 1939 to 1950.

On-going research continuously discovers unreported or misreported games (and the affected players), while some games and players may be lost forever. Therefore, some Negro league players' affiliations will likely remain incomplete and possibly disputed.

‡ Bold player inducted as a member of the National Baseball Hall of Fame and Museum.

== A–D ==
Player	Year(s)	Position(s)	Ref
Robert Abernathy	1948	OF	
Thomas Albright	1936	P	
Sandy Amorós	1950	OF	
Bill Anderson	1941–1946	P	
Jabbo Andrews	1936	OF	
Pedro Arango	1935, 1939	3B	
Mario Arencibia	1948	OF	
Mario Ariosa	1947	OF	
Paul Arnold	1936	OF	
Russell Awkard	1940	OF	
Julio Baez	1940	P	
Pedro Ballester	1948	SS	
Dave Barnhill	1941–1949	P	
Jerry Benjamin	1948	OF	
Plácido Bernal	1941	P	
Cliff Blackmon	1941	P	
Frank Blake	1935	P	
Carlos Blanco	1941	1B	
Heberto Blanco	1941–1942	SS / 2B	
Lyman Bostock Sr.	1948	OF	
Chet Brewer	1936	P	
Ameal Brooks	1936, 1942–1945	C / OF	
Willie Burns	1945	P	
Lorenzo Cabrera	1947–1950		
Walter Cannady	1945	2B	
Denio Canton	1941	P	
Esterio Caraballo	1939	OF	
Matt Carlisle	1948	SS	
Clemente Carreras	1940–1941	3B / 2B	
Spoon Carter	1940	P	
Mickey Casey	1939–1940	C	
Cleveland Clark	1945–1948	OF	
Pancho Coimbre	1940–1941, 1943–1944	OF	
Carlos Colás	1941	C	
Francisco Correa	1935–1936	2B / SS	
Ramón Couto	1935	C	
Roosevelt Cox	1942–1944	3B	
Alejandro Crespo	1940, 1946	OF	
Martin Crue	1942–1943, 1946–1948	P	
Eddie Daniels	1946–1947	P	
Jimmy Dean	1947		
Felle Delgado	1941	OF	
Fernando Díaz	1945–1947	OF	
Rufino Díaz	1947	2B	
Heliodoro Díaz	1935	C / P	
Martín Dihigo‡	1935–1936, 1945	OF / 3B / P	
Rap Dixon	1935	OF	
Lino Donoso	1947–1949	P	
Claro Duany	1944, 1947	OF	
Frank Duncan	1935–1937	C	
Alphonse Dunn	1942	OF	

== E–L ==
Player	Year(s)	Position(s)	Ref
Greene Farmer	1945	OF	
José María Fernández	1939–1942, 1944, 1947	C	
Rudy Fernández	1939, 1943–1944	P	
Tito Figueroa	1940	P	
Cocaína García	1935	P	
Silvio García	1936, 1940, 1946–1947	SS	
Gil Garrido Sr.	1944–1945	IF	
Sammy Gee	1948	SS	
Victor Greenidge	1941, 1944	P	
Acie Griggs	1948	OF	
Juan Guilbe	1940	1B / P	
Buster Haywood	1942	C	
Ramón Heredia	1939–1941	IF	
Alberto Hernández	1941	OF	
Jimmy Hicks	1941	P	
Lefty Holmes	1936, 1940	P	
Carrenza Howard	1940–1946	P	
Bertrum Hunter	1936	P	
Pee Wee Jenkins	1946–1950	P	

== K–R ==
Player	Year(s)	Position(s)	Ref
Enrique Lantigua	1935	C	
Juan León	1948	OF	
Rogelio Linares	1940, 1943–1946	OF / 1B	
Cando López	1935, 1939	OF	
Raúl López	1948–1950	P	
Lou Louden	1942–1950	C	
Dick Lundy	1935	2B	
Horacio Martínez	1935–1936, 1940–1947	SS	
Minnie Miñoso‡	1946–1948	3B	
Antonio Mirabal	1939–1940	IF / OF	
Pedro Miró	1945, 1948	2B	
Barney Morris	1942–1948	P	
Alex Newkirk	1948	P	
Ray Noble	1945–1950	C	
Alejandro Oms	1935	OF	
Pedro Pagés	1939, 1947	OF / 1B	
Willie Patterson	1950		
Javier Pérez	1935, 1942–1945	2B / 3B	
Eddie Powell	1936	C	
Alex Radcliff	1936	3B	
Connie Rector	1939	P	
Charlie Rivera	1943	IF	
Antonio Rodríguez	1939	2B	
Héctor Rodríguez	1944	3B	
Silvino Ruiz	1939–1941	P	

== S–Z ==
Player	Year(s)	Position(s)	Ref
Wilfredo Salas	1948	P	
Lázaro Salazar	1935–1936	OF / 1B	
Tommy Sampson	1948	2B	
Anastasio Santaella	1935–1936	IF / OF	
José Santiago	1948	P	
Thomas Saxon	1942	P	
Pat Scantlebury	1944–1950	P	
Charlie Shields	1942	P	
Doug Sydnor	1943	OF	
Miguel Solís	1940	2B	
Clyde Spearman	1935–1936, 1940	OF	
Joe Spencer	1945–1946	2B	
Neck Stanley	1935–1936	P	
Jim Starks	1935		
Douglas Sydnor	1943	OF	
Schoolboy Johnny Taylor	1935–1936, 1940, 1944	P	
Ron Teasley	1948	OF	
Clint Thomas	1936	OF	
Dave Thomas	1935–1936, 1942–1946	1B	
Luis Tiant Sr.	1935–1936, 1939, 1943–1947	P	
Fermín Valdés	1935, 1939	SS / 2B	
José Vargas	1939, 1944	OF	
Tetelo Vargas	1941–1943	OF	
Armando Vázquez	1945–1946, 1948	1B	
George Walden	1948	OF	
Sam Wheeler	1948	OF	
Chaney White	1936	OF	
Harry Williams	1936, 1946	2B	
Jim Williams	1942	OF	
Lincoln Williams	1942	OF	
Fred Wilson	1940	OF	
Bill Yancey	1935–1936	SS	
