= 1947 New York Cubans season =

1947 New York Cubans
- League: Negro National League
- Ballpark: Polo Grounds
- City: New York City
- Record: 46–23–1
- League place: 1st
- Managers: José María Fernández

The 1947 New York Cubans were a baseball team that competed in Negro league baseball during the 1947 baseball season. The team compiled a 46–23–1 record and won the 1947 Negro World Series, defeating the Cleveland Buckeyes four games to one.

José María Fernández was the team's manager. Shortstop Silvio Garcia and third baseman Minnie Miñoso were the team's leading hitters. Luis Tiant, Sr. and Lino Donoso were the leading pitchers.

Jackie Robinson became the first African-American to play in Major League Baseball in 1947. Several players from the 1947 Cubans also went on to play in the majors, including Miñoso in 1949 and Donoso in 1955.

== Statistics ==
=== Batting ===
Note: Pos = Position; G = Games played; AB = At bats; H = Hits; Avg. = Batting average; HR = Home runs; SLG = Slugging percentage

Pos	Player	G	AB	H	Avg.	SLG
3B	Minnie Miñoso	40	177	63	.356	.508
SS	Silvio Garcia	39	158	53	.335	.430
1B	Lorenzo Cabrera	39	166	49	.295	.452
LF	Cleveland Clark	41	151	40	.265	.358
CF	Pedro Pagés	37	148	36	.243	.351
2B	Fernando Díaz	35	134	39	.291	.351
RF	Claro Duany	35	134	43	.321	.418
C	Lou Louden	29	108	29	.269	.333
2B	Rabbit Martínez	21	60	13	.217	.300
C	Ray Noble	20	54	15	.278	.352

=== Pitching ===
Note: G = Games; IP = Innings pitched; W = Wins; L = Losses; PCT = Win percentage; ERA = Earned run average; SO = Strikeouts

Player	G	IP	W	L	PCT	ERA	SO
Luis Tiant, Sr.	14	79.2	9	0	1.000	2.37	54
Lino Donoso	13	78.1	5	2	.714	2.18	64
Patricio Scantlebury	15	77.2	7	5	.583	3.36	35
Barney Morris	11	63.1	2	5	.286	3.55	32
Martin Crue	10	42.0	2	2	.500	3.00	22
