= 1946 New York Cubans season =

1946 New York Cubans
- League: Negro National League
- Ballpark: Polo Grounds
- City: New York City
- Record: 37–37–2
- Managers: José María Fernández

The 1946 New York Cubans were a baseball team that competed in Negro National League (NNL) during the 1946 baseball season. The team compiled a 37–37–2 record (36–31–1 against NNL opponents) and finished in second place in the NNL. José María Fernández was the team's manager.

Key players included:

- Center fielder Alejandro Crespo led the team with a .349 batting average and a .519 slugging percentage.
- Shortstop Silvio Garcia led the team with 30 RBIs and 11 doubles.
- Pitcher Pat Scantlebury led the team with a 7-4 record in 78-2/3 innings pitched.
- Pitcher Luis Tiant Sr. led the team with a 2.70 earned run average (ERA) and 42 strikeouts. His son Luis Tiant played 19 seasons in Major League Baseball.

Other regular players included right fielder Fernando Díaz, first baseman Dave Thomas, left fielder Rogelio Linares, third basemban Minnie Miñoso, catcher Lou Louden, center fielder Cleveland Clark, second baseman Harry Williams, and pitchers Dave Barnhill, Barney Morris, and Martin Cruz.

== Standings ==
vs. Negro National League						vs. Major Black teams			
Negro National League	W	L	T	Pct.	GB	W	L	T	Pct.
Newark Eagles	53	21	2	.711	—	60	24	3	.707
New York Cubans	36	31	1	.537	13½	37	37	2	.500
Baltimore Elite Giants	38	34	3	.527	14	43	35	3	.549
Homestead Grays	38	35	2	.520	14½	52	40	4	.563
Philadelphia Stars	31	37	2	.457	19	33	40	4	.455
New York Black Yankees	10	48	0	.172	35	16	53	0	.232
