= 1944 New York Cubans season =

1944 New York Cubans
- League: Negro National League
- City: New York City
- Record: 53–29–2
- Managers: José María Fernández

The 1944 New York Cubans were a baseball team that competed in Negro National League (NNL) during the 1944 baseball season. The team compiled a 53–29–2 record (29–21–2 against NNL opponents) and finished in third place in the NNL. José María Fernández was the team's manager.

Key players included:

- Catcher Lou Louden led the team with a .350 batting average.
- Third baseman Héctor Rodríguez led the team with 43 hits and 30 runs scored.
- Left fielder Pancho Coimbre led the team with 22 RBIs and a .509 slugging percentge.
- Pitcher Barney Morris led the team with a 6-2 record and a 2.16 earned run average (ERA).
- Pitcher Carrenza Howard led the team with 71-2/3 innings pitched.

Other regular players included left fielder Rogelio Linares, shortstop Rabbit Martínez, center fielder José Vargas, second baseman Javier Pérez, catcher Lou Louden, first baseman Dave Thomas, pitcher Pat Scantlebury, Luis Tiant Sr., Victor Greenidge, and Dave Barnhill.

== Standings ==
vs. Negro National League						vs. Major Black teams			
Negro National League	W	L	T	Pct.	GB	W	L	T	Pct.
Homestead Grays	46	25	3	.642	—	66	32	4	.667
New York Cubans	29	21	2	.577	6½	53	29	2	.643
Philadelphia Stars	29	26	1	.527	9	37	29	1	.560
Baltimore Elite Giants	36	37	0	.493	11	47	43	1	.522
Newark Eagles	28	34	0	.452	13½	34	37	0	.479
New York Black Yankees	7	32	0	.179	23	11	39	1	.225
