= 1948 New York Cubans season =

1948 New York Cubans
- League: Negro National League
- Ballpark: Polo Grounds
- City: New York City
- Record: 30–31–1
- Managers: José María Fernández, Winfield Welch

The 1948 New York Cubans were a baseball team that competed in Negro National League (NNL) during the 1948 baseball season. The team compiled a 30–31–1 record (19–29–1 against NNL opponents) and finished in fifth place out of six teams in the NNL. It was the Cubans' final season as a major-league club, as the Negro National League folded after the 1948 season. José María Fernández began the season as manager, but was replaced in the middle of June by Winfield Welch.

Key players included:

- Third baseman Minnie Miñoso led the team with a .344 batting average, 11 doubles and six triples in 157 at bats. Minoso joined the Cleveland Indians in 1949, becoming the first Black Cuban in the American League. He was inducted into the Baseball Hall of Fame in 2022.
- First baseman Lorenzo Cabrera and catcher Ray Noble each hit .321.
- Pat Scantlebury led the team's pitchers with a 7-5 record and 63 strikeouts in 116-2/3 innings pitched.
- Dave Barnhill led the team with a 2.85 earned run average (ERA) in 85-1/3 innings pitched.

Other regular players included center fielder Cleveland Clark, shortstop Pedro Ballester, left fielder Lou Louden, second baseman Tommy Sampson, right fielder Lyman Bostock Sr., and pitchers Raúl López, José Santiago, and Pee Wee Jenkins.

== Standings ==
vs. Negro National League						vs. Major Black teams			
Negro National League	W	L	T	Pct.	GB	W	L	T	Pct.
^{(2)} Homestead Grays	46	24	2	.653	—	58	25	4	.690
^{(1)} Baltimore Elite Giants	49	29	2	.625	1	53	30	2	.635
Newark Eagles	32	29	1	.524	9½	39	34	3	.533
Philadelphia Stars	30	33	2	.477	12½	34	35	3	.493
New York Cubans	19	29	1	.398	16	30	31	1	.492
New York Black Yankees	9	41	0	.180	27	13	48	0	.213

^{(1)} First half champion ^{(2)} Second half champion
