= List of New York Cubans seasons =

This list of New York Cubans seasons documents the games played by the New York Cubans. For seasons in which the Cubans were league members or associate team, only games that counted toward official league standings are included. Conversely, seasons without league membership, during which they followed an independent or barnstorming schedule, encompass games against predominantly major-league-caliber teams.

Contemporary coverage of games and win-loss records was inconsistent and sporadic. Ongoing research continually uncovers previously unreported or inaccurately reported games, though some matches may be irretrievably lost. As a result, Negro league seasonal standings will likely remain incomplete and subject to interpretation.

== Year by year ==
Negro World Series Champions (1924–1927 & 1942–1948) *	League champions ‡	Other playoff ^

Season	Level	League	Season finish		Games	Wins	Loses	Ties	Win% (Note: Placement in annual standings were generally decided by win percentage; "games behind" were never used.)	Postseason	Ref
Season	Level	League	Full (Note: Finish in years when only a full season was indicates actual place in standings. Finish in years a split season was played indicates combined place in standings for both halves of the season.)	Split (Note: Years with a "—" did not play a split season. "1st" or 2nd" indicate which half of the season was won. "DNQ" indicates team did not win either half and did not qualify for postseason.)	Games	Wins	Loses	Ties	Win%	Postseason	Ref
New York Cubans
1935^	Major	NNL2	2	2nd	61	31	25	5	.554	Lost NNL split-season playoff (Pittsburgh Crawfords^{1}) 4–3	
1936	Major	NNL2	6	DNQ	49	22	26	1	.458		
1937	Did not field a team for the 1937 or 1938 seasons										
1938	Did not field a team for the 1937 or 1938 seasons										
1939	Major	NNL2	7	DNQ	32	7	25	0	.219		
1940	Major	NNL2	6	—	40	13	26	1	.333		
1941^	Major	NNL2	5	2nd	54	21	32	1	.396	Lost NNL split-season playoff (Homestead Grays^{1}) 3–1	
1942	Major	NNL2	6	—	50	12	37	1	.245		
1943	Major	NNL2	2	—	34	19	14	1	.576		
1944	Major	NNL2	2	DNQ	54	31	21	2	.596		
1945	Major	NNL2	5	DNQ	42	15	27	0	.357		
1946	Major	NNL2	4	DNQ	60	32	27	1	.542		
1947*	Major	NNL2	1	—	65	45	19	1	.703	Won Negro World Series (Cleveland Buckeyes) 4–1–1; Won pennant outright	
1948	Major	NNL2	5	DNQ	45	17	27	1	.386		
1949	Minor	NAL	2 (E)	—	46	26	20	0	.565		
1950	Minor	NAL	3 (E)	—	34	18	16	0	.529		

Key
