= Pedro Miró =

Cuban baseball player (born 1918)

- Third baseman / Second baseman
- Born: May 13, 1918; Alquízar, Cuba
- Died: January 28, 1996 (aged 72); Buffalo, New York, U.S.
- Batted: Unknown Threw: Right

Negro league baseball debut
- 1945, for the New York Cubans

Last appearance
- 1948, for the New York Cubans

Negro National League II statistics
- Batting average: .250
- Home runs: 0
- Runs batted in: 4

Teams
- New York Cubans (1945, 1948); Geneva Robins (1951)

Pedro Miró Pérez (May 13, 1918 – January 28, 1996) was a Cuban professional baseball third baseman and second baseman in the Negro leagues and Minor League Baseball in the 1940s and early 1950s.

A native of Alquízar, Cuba, Miró made his Negro leagues debut in 1945 with the New York Cubans, and played with them again in 1948. He went on to play minor league baseball with the Geneva Robins of the Border League (which was a Class C league, roughly equivalent to today's Class High-A) in 1951. Miró died in Buffalo, New York in 1996 at age 72.
