= Mario Ariosa =

Cuban baseball player

- Outfielder
- Born: September 12, 1920; Remedios, Cuba
- Died: January 20, 1992 (aged 71)
- Batted: Right Threw: Right

Negro leagues debut
- 1947, for the New York Cubans

Last Negro leagues appearance
- 1947, for the New York Cubans

Negro leagues statistics
- Batting average: .250
- Home runs: 0
- Runs batted in: 3
- Stats at Baseball Reference

Teams
- New York Cubans (1947)

Member of the Mexican Professional

Baseball Hall of Fame
- Induction: 1982

Mario Ariosa (September 12, 1920 – January 20, 1992) was a Cuban outfielder who played in the American Negro leagues in 1947.

A native of Remedios, Cuba, Ariosa played a single season in the Negro leagues as a member of the New York Cubans during their 1947 Negro World Series championship campaign. He went on to play and manage for many seasons in the Mexican League, and is a member of the Mexican Professional Baseball Hall of Fame. Ariosa died in 1992 at age 71.
