= Ramón Heredia (baseball) =

Cuban baseball player (born 1913)

- Third baseman / First baseman / Second baseman
- Born: February 18, 1913; Matanzas, Cuba
- Batted: Right Threw: Right

Negro league baseball debut
- 1939, for the New York Cubans

Last appearance
- 1941, for the New York Cubans

Negro National League II statistics
- Batting average: .278
- Home runs: 4
- Runs batted in: 35
- Stats at Baseball Reference

Teams
- New York Cubans (1939–1941)

Ramón Heredia Ponce de Leon (born February 18, 1913, date of death unknown) was a Cuban professional baseball third baseman, first baseman and second baseman who played in the Negro leagues from 1939–1941 and in the Mexican League from 1942–1947, as well as in 1949.

A native of Matanzas, Cuba, Heredia made his Negro leagues debut in 1939 with the New York Cubans. He played three seasons with New York, then went on to spend five seasons with the Industriales de Monterrey and two seasons with the Azules de Veracruz in the Mexican League.
