= Sam Wheeler =

American basketball player

- Outfielder
- Born: November 15, 1923; Little Rock, Arkansas
- Died: April 16, 1989 (aged 65); St. Louis, Missouri
- Batted: Right Threw: Right

Negro leagues debut
- 1948, for the New York Cubans

Last appearance
- 1948, for the New York Cubans

Teams
- New York Cubans (1948)

Samuel Wallace Wheeler, Jr. (November 15, 1923 – April 16, 1989), nicknamed "Boom Boom", was an American professional basketball player with the Harlem Globetrotters and Harlem Magicians, and was an outfielder in Negro league baseball for the New York Cubans.

A native of Little Rock, Arkansas, Wheeler attended Dunbar High School and Philander Smith College, where he was a star basketball player. He played professional baseball with the New York Cubans of the Negro National League in 1948, and hit a grand slam in his first game with the team. Wheeler joined the Harlem Globetrotters in 1950 and spent several years with them.

Wheeler married educator Betty McNeal, daughter of Theodore McNeal, the first African American to serve in the Missouri Senate, and a union organizer and activist.

Wheeler died in St. Louis, Missouri in 1989 at age 65.
