= Rufino Díaz =

Professional baseball player

- Second baseman
- Born: 1922 (age 102–103)

Negro league baseball debut
- 1947, for the New York Cubans

Last appearance
- 1947, for the New York Cubans

Teams
- New York Cubans (1947)

Rufino R. Díaz Palomo (born 1922) is a former Negro league second baseman who played in the 1940s.

Diaz played for the New York Cubans during their 1947 Negro World Series championship season.
