= Antonio Mirabal =

Antonio Mirabal may refer to:

- Antonio Mirabal (poet)
- Antonio Mirabal (baseball)
