= Fermín Valdés =

Cuban baseball player (1910–?)

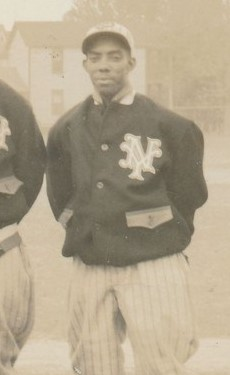
- Second baseman / Shortstop
- Born: August 16, 1910; Guanabacoa, Cuba
- Batted: Right Threw: Right

Professional debut
- Negro league baseball: 1931, for the Cuban House of David
- Mexican League: 1945, for the Tecolotes de Nuevo Laredo

Last appearance
- Negro league baseball: 1944, for the Cincinnati-Indianapolis Clowns
- Mexican League: 1945, for the Tecolotes de Nuevo Laredo

East–West League, Negro National League II & Negro American League statistics
- Batting average: .222
- Home runs: 0
- Runs batted in: 17

Teams
- Cuban House of David (1931); Pollock's Cuban Stars (1932); New York Cubans (1935, 1939); Cincinnati-Indianapolis Clowns (1944); Tecolotes de Nuevo Laredo (1945)

Fermín Valdés Peña (August 16, 1910 – death unknown) was a Cuban professional baseball second baseman and shortstop in the Negro leagues between 1931 and 1944 and the Mexican League in 1945.

A native of Guanabacoa, Cuba, Valdés made his Negro leagues debut in 1931 with the Cuban House of David, and also played for the team once it joined the East–West League as Pollock's Cuban Stars in 1932. He joined the New York Cubans in 1935, played them again in 1939, and finished his Negro league career in 1944 with the Indianapolis Clowns. He played one season in the Mexican League for Tecolotes de Nuevo Laredo in 1945.
