= Eddie Daniels (baseball) =

American baseball player (1922–1992)

- Pitcher
- Born: April 14, 1922; Marshall, Texas, U.S.
- Died: December 13, 1992 (aged 70); Dallas, Texas, U.S.
- Batted: Left Threw: Left

Negro league baseball debut
- 1946, for the New York Cubans

Last appearance
- 1947, for the New York Cubans

Teams
- New York Cubans (1946–1947)

Eddie Bell Daniels (April 14, 1922 – December 13, 1992) was an American Negro league pitcher who played in the 1940s.

A native of Dallas, Texas, Daniels made his Negro leagues debut in 1946 with the New York Cubans. He played for New York again the following year, during the Cubans' 1947 Negro World Series championship season.

Daniels died on December 13, 1992, at the age of 70.
