= Fred Wilson (baseball) =

American baseball player

- Outfielder
- Born: August 31, 1908; Palatka, Florida, U.S.
- Died: September 27, 1948 (aged 40); Miami, Florida, U.S.
- Batted: Left Threw: Right

Negro league baseball debut
- 1939, for the Newark Eagles

Last appearance
- 1945, for the Cincinnati Clowns

Teams
- Newark Eagles (1939); New York Cubans (1940); Ethiopian Clowns (1941–1942); Cincinnati Clowns (1943–1945)

Fred Wilson (August 31, 1908 – September 27, 1948), nicknamed "Sardo", was an American Negro league outfielder in the 1930s and 1940s.

A native of Palatka, Florida, Wilson was serving time in a Miami prison in the late 1930s when he was offered his release if he would sign with the Newark Eagles. Wilson was the player-manager of the Cincinnati Clowns in 1943, and was selected to play in the East–West All-Star Game that season. Wilson served in the US Army during World War II. Known for his erratic and sometimes violent behavior, Wilson reportedly stabbed teammate Dave Barnhill in 1944, causing Barnhill to miss the season. Wilson himself died of a stab wound in Miami, Florida in 1948 at age 40.
