= Negro National League =

Negro National League can refer to either one or both of the two leagues of Negro league baseball in the United States in the first half of the twentieth century:

- Negro National League (1920–1931)
- Negro National League (1933–1948)
