= Silvino Ruiz =

Cuban baseball player (born 1901)

- Pitcher / First baseman / Corner outfielder
- Born: 1901; Guanabacoa, Cuba
- Batted: Right Threw: Right

Negro league baseball debut
- 1928, for the Cuban Stars (East)

Last appearance
- 1941, for the New York Cubans

Eastern Colored League, American Negro League & Negro National League II statistics
- Win–loss record: 11–14
- Earned run average: 4.38
- Strikeouts: 69
- Batting average: .154
- Home runs: 0
- Runs batted in: 7

Teams
- Cuban Stars (East) (1928–1929, 1937); New York Cubans (1938–1941)

Career highlights and awards
- Negro League All-Star (1940)

Silvino Ruiz (1901 – death unknown), nicknamed "Poppa", was a Cuban professional baseball pitcher, first baseman and corner outfielder in the Negro leagues between 1928 and 1941.

A native of Guanabacoa, Cuba, Ruiz played for the Cuban Stars (East) in 1928 and 1929, then returned to the team in 1937. He went on to play four seasons for the New York Cubans, and represented New York in the 1940 East–West All-Star Game.
