= Pedro Ballester =

Pedro Ballester may refer to:

- Pedro Ballester, a village in the municipality Primero de Enero
- Pedro Ballester (baseball) (born 1924), Cuban shortstop in the Negro leagues
