= Bill Anderson (1940s pitcher) =

American baseball player

- Pitcher
- Born: January 25, 1913; Brevard, North Carolina, U.S.
- Died: March 25, 1971 (aged 58); Cincinnati, Ohio, U.S.
- Batted: Left Threw: Right

Negro league baseball debut
- 1941, for the New York Cubans

Last appearance
- 1947, for the Newark Eagles

Career statistics
- Win–loss record: 18–17
- Earned run average: 4.69
- Strikeouts: 107
- Stats at Baseball Reference

Teams
- New York Cubans (1941–1943); Homestead Grays (1943); New York Cubans (1944–1946); Newark Eagles (1947)

William Albert "Fireman" Anderson (January 25, 1913 – March 25, 1971) was an American professional baseball pitcher in the Negro leagues in the 1940s.

A native of Brevard, North Carolina, Anderson played mostly with the New York Cubans from 1941 to 1946, and briefly with the Homestead Grays in 1943 and the Newark Eagles in 1947. He also played with the Drummondville Royals of the Provincial League in 1953. Anderson died in Cincinnati, Ohio in 1971 at age 58.
