= Antonio Rodríguez (baseball) =

Cuban baseball player (born 1915)

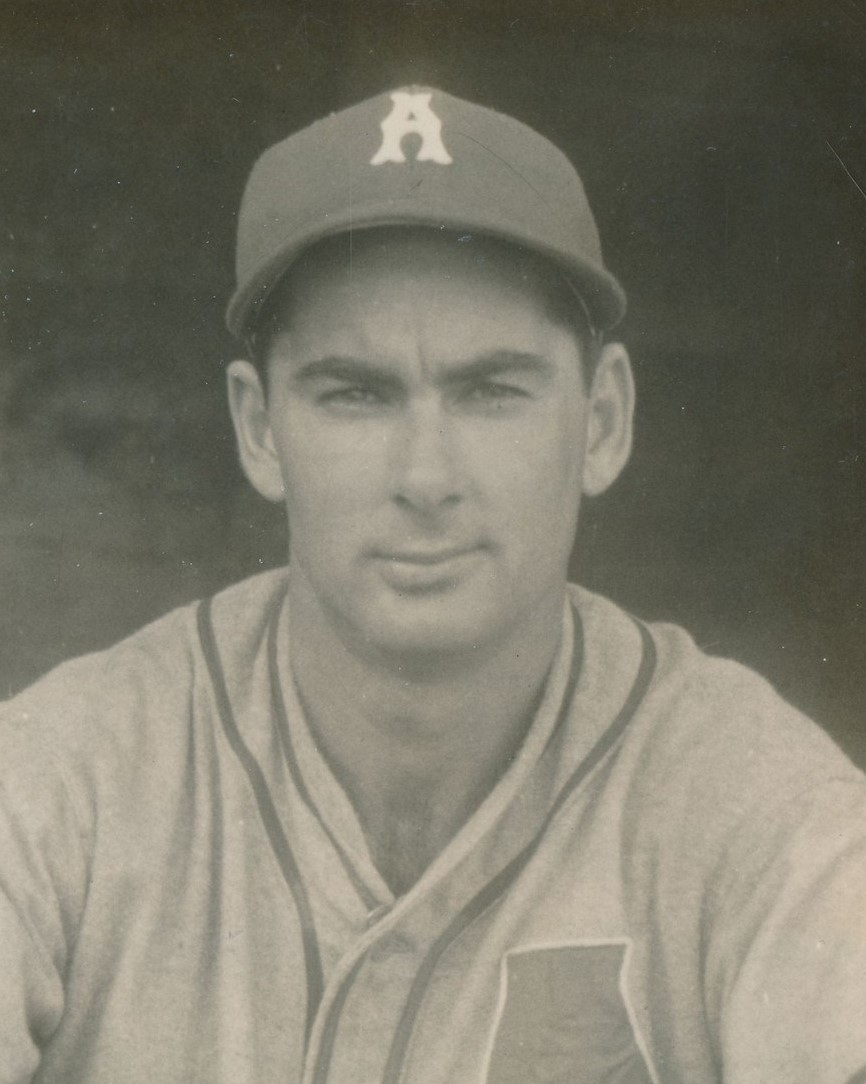
- Second baseman / Shortstop / Third baseman
- Born: 1915 (age 110–111); Havana, Cuba
- Batted: Right Threw: Right

Negro league baseball debut
- 1935, for the Cuban Stars (East)

Last appearance
- 1939, for the New York Cubans

Teams
- Cuban Stars (East) (1935); New York Cubans (1939)

Arturo Antonio Rodríguez (born 1915), nicknamed "Pollo", was a Cuban professional baseball second baseman, shortstop and third baseman in the Negro leagues and Mexican League.

A native of Havana, Cuba, Rodríguez made his Negro leagues debut in 1935 with the Cuban Stars (East). He went on to play for the New York Cubans in 1939, and played in the Mexican League into the mid-1940s.
