= Esterio Caraballo =

Cuban baseball player (born 1913)

- Outfielder
- Born: 1913; Palma Soriano, Cuba

Negro league baseball debut
- 1937, for the Cuban Stars (East)

Last appearance
- 1939, for the New York Cubans
- Stats at Baseball Reference

Teams
- Cuban Stars (East) (1937); New York Cubans (1939)

Esterio Caraballo (born 1913) was a Cuban professional baseball outfielder in the Negro leagues who played in the 1930s.

A native of Palma Soriano, Cuba, Caraballo made his Negro leagues debut in 1937 with the Cuban Stars (East). He went on to play for the New York Cubans in 1939.
