= Eddie Powell (baseball) =

American baseball player (1910-1986)

- Catcher
- Born: July 12, 1910; Livingston, Alabama, U.S.
- Died: November 1986; New York, New York, U.S.
- Batted: Right Threw: Right

Negro league baseball debut
- 1936, for the New York Cubans

Last appearance
- 1938, for the Washington Black Senators

Teams
- New York Cubans (1936); New York Black Yankees (1937); Washington Black Senators (1938)

Edward D. Powell (July 12, 1910 – November 1986), nicknamed "Big Red", was an American Negro league catcher in the 1930s.

A native of Livingston, Alabama, Powell made his Negro leagues debut in 1936 for the New York Cubans. The following season, he played for the New York Black Yankees, and finished his career in 1938 with the Washington Black Senators. Powell died in New York, New York, in 1986 at age 76.
