= Antonio Mirabal (baseball) =

Cuban baseball player (born 1910)

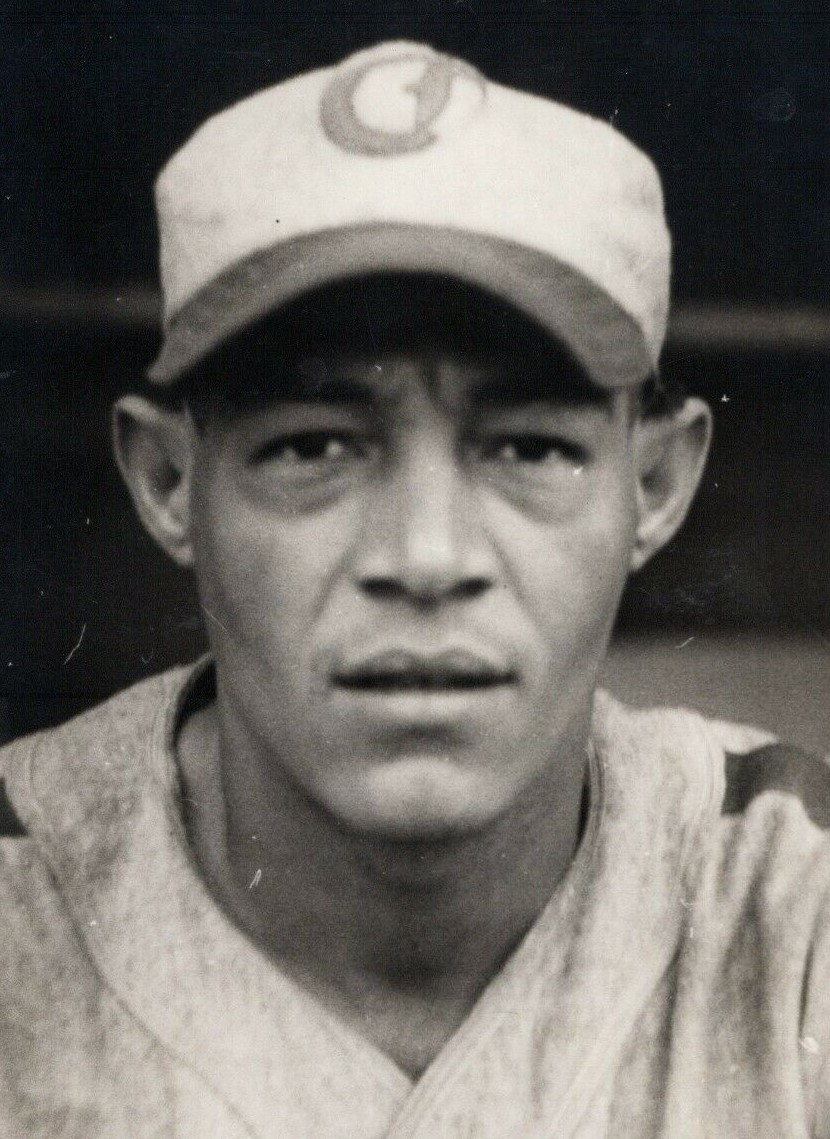
- Outfielder / Second baseman / Shortstop
- Born: 1910; Bauta, Cuba

Negro league baseball debut
- 1939, for the New York Cubans

Last appearance
- 1940, for the New York Cubans

Negro National League II statistics
- Batting average: .172
- Home runs: 0
- Runs batted in: 3

Teams
- New York Cubans (1939–1940)

Antonio Mirabal (born 1910, date of death unknown), sometimes listed as "Autorio", was a Cuban professional baseball outfielder, second baseman and shortstop in the Negro leagues in 1939 and 1940.

A native of Bauta, Cuba, Mirabal made his Negro leagues debut in 1939 with the New York Cubans and played with them through 1940.
