= Martin Crue =

American baseball player

- Pitcher
- Born: September 14, 1919; Mobile, Alabama, U.S.
- Died: July 14, 1994 (aged 74); Miami, Florida, U.S.
- Batted: Left Threw: Left

Negro league baseball debut
- 1942, for the New York Cubans

Last appearance
- 1948, for the New York Cubans
- Stats at Baseball Reference

Teams
- New York Cubans (1942–1943); New York Black Yankees (1945); New York Cubans (1946–1948)

Martin Joseph Crue Jr. (September 14, 1919 – July 14, 1994) was an American Negro league baseball pitcher in the 1940s.

A native of Mobile, Alabama, Crue made his Negro leagues debut in 1942 with the New York Cubans. In 1945, he played for the New York Black Yankees, but returned to the Cubans from 1946 to 1948, playing on their 1947 Negro World Series championship team. Following his Negro leagues career, Crue played for the Elmwood Giants of the Mandak League in 1950. He died in Miami, Florida in 1994 at age 74.
