= Douglas Sydnor =

American baseball player

- Outfielder
- Born: December 28, 1919; West Point, Virginia, U.S.
- Died: July 29, 1969 (aged 49); West Point, Virginia, U.S.
- Batted: Right Threw: Right

Negro league baseball debut
- 1943, for the New York Cubans

Last appearance
- 1944, for the New York Black Yankees

Career statistics
- Batting average: .160
- Home runs: 1
- Runs batted in: 7
- s/sydnodo01.shtml Stats at Baseball Reference

Teams
- New York Cubans (1943); New York Black Yankees (1943–1944)

Douglas Louis Sydnor (December 28, 1919 – July 29, 1969), also known as Doug Sydnor, was an American Negro league outfielder in the 1940s.

A native of West Point, Virginia, Sydnor made his Negro leagues debut in 1943 with the New York Cubans and New York Black Yankees. He played for the Black Yankees again the following season.

In 11 recorded games, he posted three hits in 28 plate appearances.

Sydnor died in his hometown of West Point in 1969 at age 49.
