= José Vargas (baseball) =

Cuban baseball player (born 1905)

- Outfielder
- Born: 1905; Manzanillo, Cuba
- Batted: Right Threw: Right

Negro league baseball debut
- 1935, for the Cuban Stars (East)

Last appearance
- 1944, for the New York Cubans

Negro National League II statistics
- Batting average: .284
- Home runs: 2
- Runs batted in: 19

Teams
- Cuban Stars (East) (1935); New York Cubans (1939, 1944)

José Sotero Vargas (1905 – death date unknown) was a Cuban professional baseball outfielder in the Negro leagues in the 1930s and 1940s.

A native of Manzanillo, Cuba, Vargas made his Negro leagues debut in 1935 with the Cuban Stars (East). He went on to play for the New York Cubans in 1939 and 1944.
