= Francisco Correa =

Cuban baseball player (born 1905)

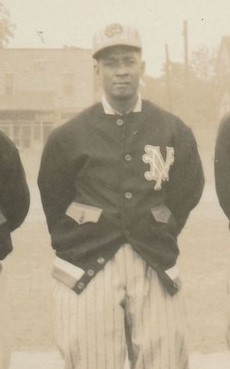
- Shortstop / Second baseman / Corner outfielder
- Born: 1905; Havana, Cuba
- Died: Unknown
- Batted: Right Threw: Right

Negro league baseball debut
- 1926, for the Cuban Stars (West)

Last appearance
- 1936, for the New York Cubans
- Stats at Baseball Reference

Teams
- Cuban Stars (West) (1926–1928); Cuban Stars (East) (1929, 1933–1934); New York Cubans (1935–1936)

Francisco Correa Hernández (1905 – death unknown), nicknamed "Cuco", was a Cuban professional baseball shortstop, second baseman and corner outfielder in the Negro leagues, Cuban League and Mexican League in the 1920s and 1930s.

A native of Havana, Cuba, Correa made his Negro leagues debut in 1926 with the Cuban Stars (West). He played for the club two more seasons, then played for the Cuban Stars (East) and New York Cubans.
