= Plácido Bernal =

Cuban baseball pitcher (born 1914)

- Pitcher / Left fielder
- Born: 1914; Sancti Spíritus, Cuba

Negro league baseball debut
- 1941, for the New York Cubans

Last appearance
- 1941, for the New York Cubans
- Stats at Baseball Reference

Teams
- New York Cubans (1941)

Plácido Bernal (1914 - death date unknown) was a Cuban baseball pitcher and left fielder in the Negro leagues. Also listed as Blacedo Bernal, he played with New York Cubans in 1941.
