= Raúl López (baseball) =

Cuban baseball player (born 1929)

- Pitcher
- Born: April 15, 1929; Caimito del Guayabal, Cuba
- Batted: Left Threw: Left

Negro league baseball debut
- 1948, for the New York Cubans

Last appearance
- 1948, for the New York Cubans

Negro National League II statistics
- Win-loss record: 2–5
- Earned run average: 4.30
- Strikeouts: 35
- Stats at Baseball Reference

Teams
- New York Cubans (1948)

Raúl López (born April 15, 1929) is a Cuban former professional baseball pitcher who played in the Negro leagues in 1948.

A native of Caimito del Guayabal, Cuba, López played for the New York Cubans in 1948. In his 13 recorded appearances, he posted a 4.30 ERA over 58.2 innings.
