= Willie Patterson (baseball) =

American baseball player

Willie "Pat" Patterson
- Infielder / Catcher
- Born: April 1, 1919; Americus, Georgia, U.S.
- Died: August 20, 2004 (aged 85); Mobile, Alabama, U.S.
- Batted: Right Threw: Right

Negro league baseball debut
- 1946, for the Birmingham Black Barons

Last appearance
- 1955, for the Birmingham Black Barons

Teams
- Birmingham Black Barons (1946–1947); Memphis Red Sox (1948); Chicago American Giants (1949); New York Cubans (1950); Birmingham Black Barons (1951); Chicago American Giants (1951–1952); Philadelphia Stars (1952); Memphis Red Sox (1953); Birmingham Black Barons (1955)

Willie Lee Patterson Jr. (April 1, 1919 – August 20, 2004) was an American Negro league infielder and catcher in the 1940s and 1950s.

A native of Americus, Georgia, Patterson began his Negro league career in 1946 with the Birmingham Black Barons, and was named to the 1952 and 1953 East–West All-Star Games. After his baseball career, Patterson worked as a longshoreman in Mobile, Alabama until his retirement in 1981. He died in Mobile in 2004 at age 85.
