= Wilfredo Salas =

Cuban baseball player (1922–1956)

- Pitcher
- Born: October 6, 1922; Guantánamo, Cuba
- Died: August 14, 1956 (aged 33); Calpulalpan, Mexico
- Threw: Right

Negro league baseball debut
- 1948, for the New York Cubans

Last appearance
- 1948, for the New York Cubans

Teams
- New York Cubans (1948)

Wilfredo Salas (October 6, 1922 – August 14, 1956) was a Cuban baseball pitcher in the Negro leagues and the Mexican League.

A native of Guantánamo, Cuba, Salas played for the New York Cubans in 1948, and during the same season also played minor league baseball with the Sherbrooke Athletics. He played the majority of his career in the Mexican League, where he spent several seasons between 1946 and 1956. Salas died in Calpulalpan, Mexico in 1956 at age 33.
