= Alex Newkirk =

American baseball player

- Pitcher
- Born: December 12, 1916; Wilmington, North Carolina, U.S.
- Died: May 10, 1996 (aged 79)
- Batted: Left Threw: Right

Negro league baseball debut
- 1946, for the New York Black Yankees

Last appearance
- 1948, for the New York Cubans

Teams
- New York Black Yankees (1946–1948); New York Cubans (1948)

Alexander Newkirk (December 12, 1916 – May 10, 1996), nicknamed "Slats", was an American Negro league pitcher in the 1940s.

A native of Wilmington, North Carolina, Newkirk made his Negro leagues debut in 1946 for the New York Black Yankees. He played for the Black Yankees for three seasons, and also played for the New York Cubans in 1948. Newkirk went on to play minor league baseball in the Provincial League for the St. Jean Braves and Granby Red Sox in 1950 and 1951. He died in 1996 at age 79.
