= Julio Baez =

Cuban baseball player

- Pitcher
- Born: November 30, 1918; Santo Domingo, Dominican Republic
- Died: May 29, 1989 (aged 70); Santo Domingo, Dominican Republic

Negro league baseball debut
- 1940, for the New York Cubans

Last appearance
- 1940, for the New York Cubans
- Stats at Baseball Reference

Teams
- New York Cubans (1940)

Andrés Julio Baez Rivera (November 30 1918 - May 29, 1989) was a Dominican professional baseball pitcher in the Negro leagues and Mexican League. He played with the New York Cubans in 1940. In 1946, he played for Alijadores de Tampico.
