= Jim Starks =

American baseball player

- First baseman
- Born: April 23, 1906; Springfield, Missouri, U.S.
- Died: unknown
- Batted: Right Threw: Right

Negro league baseball debut
- 1927, for the Memphis Red Sox

Last appearance
- 1946, for the New York Black Yankees

Teams
- Memphis Red Sox (1927); Kansas City Monarchs (1927, 1933); Newark Dodgers (1934–1935); New York Cubans (1935); Pittsburgh Crawfords (1937); New York Black Yankees (1938, 1940–1946); Harrisburg Stars (1943); Birmingham Black Barons (1945)

James Theodore Starks (April 23, 1906 – death date unknown), nicknamed "Bruiser", was an American Negro league baseball first baseman from 1927 to 1946.

A native of Springfield, Missouri, James Theodore Starks made his Negro leagues debut in 1927 with the Memphis Red Sox. Starks was later transferred to the Kansas City Monarchs. He went on to play for several additional teams, including eight seasons with the New York Black Yankees, where he finished his career in 1946.
