= Ramón Couto =

Cuban baseball player (1906-1977)

- Catcher
- Born: December 8, 1906; Havana, Cuba
- Died: February 17, 1977 (aged 70)
- Batted: Right Threw: Right

Negro league baseball debut
- 1935, for the New York Cubans

Last appearance
- 1935, for the New York Cubans

Teams
- New York Cubans (1935)

Ramón Couto Florida (December 8, 1906 – February 17, 1977) was a Cuban catcher in the Negro leagues in the 1930s.

A native of Havana, Cuba, Couto played for the New York Cubans in 1935. He died in 1977 at age 70.
