= Alberto Hernández (outfielder) =

Cuban baseball player (born 1917)

- Corner outfielder
- Born: January 13, 1917; Jovellanos, Cuba
- Batted: Right Threw: Right

Negro league baseball debut
- 1941, for the New York Cubans

Last appearance
- 1941, for the New York Cubans
- Stats at Baseball Reference

Teams
- New York Cubans (1941)

Alberto Hernández (born January 13, 1917) was a Cuban professional baseball corner outfielder in the Negro leagues and the Mexican League.

A native of Jovellanos, Cuba, Hernández played for the New York Cubans in 1941. He went on to play in the Mexican League into the mid-1940s.
