= Ron Teasley =

American baseball player (1927–2026)

- Outfielder
- Born: January 26, 1927; Detroit, Michigan, U.S.
- Died: February 3, 2026 (aged 99); Detroit, Michigan, U.S.
- Batted: Right Threw: Right

Negro league baseball debut
- 1948, for the New York Cubans

Last appearance
- 1948, for the New York Cubans

Teams
- New York Cubans (1948)

Ronald Teasley Sr. (January 26, 1927 – February 3, 2026) was an American professional baseball outfielder.

== Early life and education ==
A native of Detroit, Michigan, Teasley attended Northwestern High School and Wayne State University, where he was a baseball and basketball player. He served in the US Navy in 1945 and 1946.

== Career ==
Teasley played with the New York Cubans in 1948 after being released by the Olean Oilers, a Brooklyn Dodgers farm club. He went on to play for the Carman Cardinals of the Mandak League in 1949 and 1950.

== Personal life and death ==
Teasley was a Catholic and attended St. Moses, the Black Catholic Church in Detroit. He was inducted into the Wayne State University athletic hall of fame in 1986. He died on February 3, 2026, at the age of 99.
