= George Walden (baseball) =

American baseball player

- Outfielder
- Batted: Right Threw: Right

Negro league baseball debut
- 1948, for the New York Cubans

Last appearance
- 1948, for the New York Cubans

Teams
- New York Cubans (1948)

George Walden is an American former Negro league outfielder who played in the 1940s.

Walden played for the New York Cubans in 1948. In seven recorded games, he posted three hits in 28 plate appearances.
