= Denio Canton =

Cuban baseball player (born 1919)

- Pitcher
- Born: July 19, 1919; Havana, Cuba
- Died: March 22, 2005 (aged 85); Miami, Florida, U.S.
- Threw: Right

Negro league baseball debut
- 1941, for the New York Cubans

Last appearance
- 1941, for the New York Cubans

Teams
- New York Cubans (1941)

Denio Canton (July 19, 1919 – March 22, 2005) was a Cuban professional baseball pitcher in the Negro leagues in the 1940s.

A native of Havana, Cuba, Canton played for the New York Cubans in 1941. He died in Miami, Florida in 2005 at age 85.
