= Roosevelt Cox =

American baseball player (1914–??)

- Third baseman
- Born: 1914; Baton Rouge, Louisiana, U.S.
- Died: Unknown
- Batted: Right Threw: Right

Negro league baseball debut
- 1937, for the Detroit Stars

Last appearance
- 1944, for the New York Cubans
- Stats at Baseball Reference

Teams
- Detroit Stars (1937); Chicago American Giants (1937); Kansas City Monarchs (1938); New York Cubans (1942–1944); New York Black Yankees (1943)

Theodore Roosevelt Cox (born 1914), nicknamed "Benny", was an American Negro league third baseman between 1937 and 1944.

A native of Baton Rouge, Louisiana, Cox made his Negro leagues debut in 1937 with the Detroit Stars and Chicago American Giants. He played for the Kansas City Monarchs the following season, and ended his career with a three-year stint with the New York Cubans from 1942 to 1944.
