= Miguel Solís (baseball) =

Cuban baseball player (born 1906)

Miguel Solis
- Third baseman / Shortstop / Second baseman
- Born: 1906; Marianao, Cuba
- Died: Unknown; Unknown
- Batted: Right Threw: Right

Negro league baseball debut
- 1927, for the Team Cuba

Last appearance
- 1940, for the New York Cubans

Teams
- Team Cuba (1927–1928); Cuban Stars (East) (1928-1929); Cuban Stars (West) (1930-1936); New York Cubans (1940)

Miguel Solís Pérez (1906 – death date unknown) was a Cuban professional baseball third baseman, shortstop and second baseman in the Cuban League and Negro leagues. He played professionally from 1927 to 1940, mostly with the Cuban Stars (East) and Cuban Stars (West).
