= Javier Pérez (baseball) =

Cuban baseball player (born 1902)

- Middle infielder
- Born: February 3, 1902; San Antonio de los Baños, Cuba
- Died: Unknown; Unknown
- Batted: Right Threw: Right

Negro league baseball debut
- 1933, for the Bacharach Giants

Last appearance
- 1945, for the New York Cubans

Negro National League II statistics
- Batting average: .270
- Home runs: 3
- Runs batted in: 102

Teams
- Bacharach Giants (1933–1934); Brooklyn Eagles (1935); New York Cubans (1935); Homestead Grays (1937–1938); New York Cubans (1942–1945)

Javier Francisco Pérez Larrinaga (February 3, 1902 – death unknown), nicknamed "Blue", was a Cuban professional baseball middle infielder in the Negro leagues during the 1930s and 1940s.

A native of San Antonio de los Baños, Cuba, Pérez made his Negro leagues debut in 1933 with the Bacharach Giants. He went on to play for the Brooklyn Eagles and Homestead Grays, and finished his career with a four-year stint with the New York Cubans from 1942 to 1945. In 1943, he was part of a rare triple play executed by New York against the Birmingham Black Barons at Rickwood Park.
