= Dave Barnhill =

American baseball player (1913–1983)

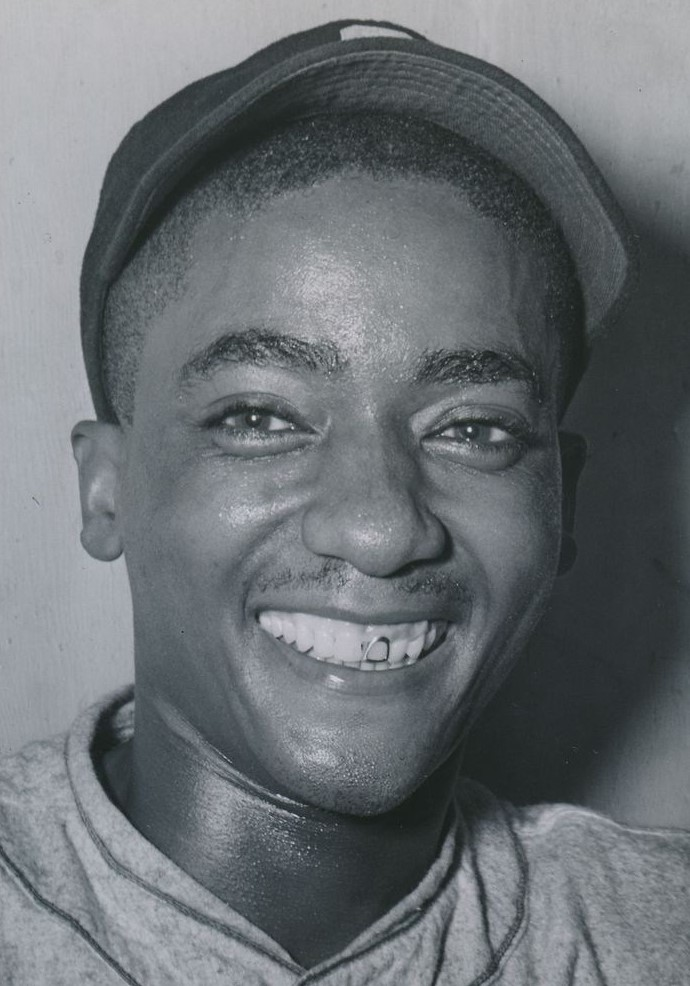
- Pitcher
- Born: October 30, 1913; Greenville, North Carolina, US
- Died: January 8, 1983 (aged 68); Miami, Florida, US
- Batted: Both Threw: Right

Negro league baseball debut
- 1941, for the New York Cubans

Last appearance
- 1948, for the New York Cubans
- Stats at Baseball Reference

Teams
- New York Cubans (1941–1948); Minneapolis Millers (1949–1951); Miami Beach Flamingos (1952); Fort Lauderdale Lions (1953)

Career highlights and awards
- 5× NgL All-Star (1941–1943, 1948); Negro National League strikeout leader (1941)

David Barnhill (October 30, 1913 – January 8, 1983) was an American professional baseball pitcher. Barnhill played in the Negro leagues from 1941 to 1948 with the New York Cubans. He also played in the minor leagues for the Minneapolis Millers from 1949 to 1951, the Miami Beach Flamingos in 1952, and the Fort Lauderdale Lions in 1953.

== Pro career ==
Dave Barnhill made his debut for the New York Cubans in 1941. The Cubans were managed by José María Fernández, and finished 5th, just above the last place Philadelphia Stars. Despite the second division finish, Barnhill led the team in wins, finishing 9-4 with an E.R.A. of 3.02. He also finished with a respectable .295 batting average while driving in six runs. In 1942, the Cubans finished last, just one win behind the New York Black Yankees. The Cubans finished with a 9-27 record, but again, Barnhill was a bright spot in the pitching rotation. While he finished with a 3-6 record, his E.R.A. of 2.87 was the best on the team.

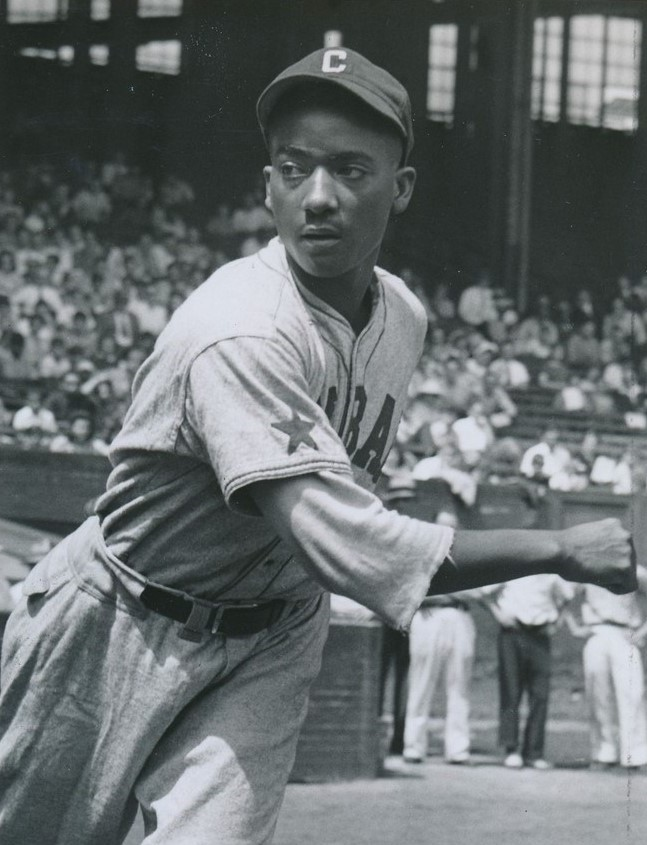
Barnhill with the New York Cubans in 1942

1943 proved to be a bounce back year for Barnhill, and the New York Cubans overall. The team that the previous season finished in last place, vaulted to second. Barnhill again was the ace of the staff, going 11-4 with a 2.83 E.R.A. Barnhill led the team in wins and E.R.A. And again, Barnhill proved himself a quality hitter at the plate, as he batted .327 and drive in 10 runs. In 1944, Barnhill struggled, and was demoted from the role of number one starter, replaced by Carrenza Howard. Barnhill went 3-2 and had an E.R.A. of 3.82.

In 1945, Barnhill continued to struggle, but was promoted to number two in the rotation, with Luis Tiant Sr. supplanting Howard, who had been released after losing both his starts. Barnhill struggled to retain his form from 1943, going just 2-3 for the Cubans. Barnhill struggled to get above .500 in 1946, and his batting showed signs of decline as well.

In 1947, the New York Cubans faced off with the Cleveland Buckeyes in the Negro League World Series. Barnhill appeared in three games, picking up the win in one of them. The Cubans took the title in the series, defeating Cleveland 4 games to 1, with one tie.

In 1948, The Cubans were unable to successfully defend their championship, finishing in fifth place with a 19-29 record. Barnhill finished with a 4-7 record, and an E.R.A. of 2.85. With the American and National Leagues raiding the Negro leagues for talent, the New York Cubans folded after the 1948 season.
