= Russell Awkard =

American baseball player

- Outfielder
- Born: October 7, 1917; Howard County, Maryland, U.S.
- Died: April 1, 2002 (aged 84); Louisville, Kentucky, U.S.
- Batted: Left Threw: Right

Negro league baseball debut
- 1940, for the New York Cubans

Last appearance
- 1941, for the Newark Eagles
- Stats at Baseball Reference

Teams
- New York Cubans (1940); Newark Eagles (1941)

Russell Alfred Awkard (October 7, 1917 – April 1, 2002) was an American Negro league outfielder in the 1940s.

A native of Howard County, Maryland, Awkard initially played for the Washington Royals, and joined the New York Cubans in 1940. Awkard was a World War II veteran, having served in the US Army's Quartermaster Corps in England, France and Belgium. He was considered to be one of the Negro league's finest players. He was featured in an article in USA Today titled "The Name is Awkard, with one W." in 1993. Prior to his death, he met with Bill Clinton along with other Negro league players arranged by Bob Hieronimus.
