= Robert Abernathy (baseball) =

American baseball player (1917–1997)

- Outfielder
- Born: July 12, 1917; Columbia, Tennessee, U.S.
- Died: September 2, 1997 (aged 80); Nashville, Tennessee, U.S.
- Batted: Unknown Threw: Unknown

Negro league baseball debut
- 1945, for the Kansas City Monarchs

Last appearance
- 1948, for the New York Cubans
- Stats at Baseball Reference

Teams
- Kansas City Monarchs (1945); Indianapolis–Cincinnati Clowns (1947); New York Cubans (1948)

Robert William Abernathy (July 12, 1917 – September 2, 1997), also listed as James Abernathy, was an American professional baseball outfielder in the Negro leagues. He played with the Kansas City Monarchs in 1945, the Indianapolis–Cincinnati Clowns in 1947, and the New York Cubans in 1948.

His career ended when he broke his leg in 1948 while trying to break his slide at home plate while scoring from third base.
