= Juan León =

Cuban baseball player (born 1919

- Outfielder
- Born: 1919; Gibara, Cuba
- Died: 1992 (aged 72–73)
- Batted: Left Threw: Left

Negro league baseball debut
- 1948, for the New York Cubans

Last appearance
- 1948, for the New York Cubans

Teams
- New York Cubans (1948)

Juan León (1919 – 1992) was a Cuban professional baseball outfielder in the Negro leagues in the 1940s.

A native of Gibara, Cuba, León played for the New York Cubans in 1948. In 13 recorded games, he posted 19 hits and eight RBI in 57 plate appearances.
