= Jimmy Hicks (baseball) =

American baseball player

- Pitcher
- Batted: Right Threw: Right

Negro league baseball debut
- 1940, for the Homestead Grays

Last appearance
- 1941, for the New York Cubans
- Stats at Baseball Reference

Teams
- Homestead Grays (1940); New York Cubans (1941)

James Eugene Hicks is an American former Negro league pitcher who played in the 1940s.

Hicks made his Negro leagues debut in 1940 with the Homestead Grays, and played for the New York Cubans the following season. In five recorded career appearances on the mound, he posted a 1–1 record over 15.1 innings.
