= Cando López =

Cuban baseball player (born 1906)

- Center fielder / Left fielder
- Born: 1906; Havana, Cuba
- Batted: Right Threw: Right

Negro league baseball debut
- 1926, for the Cuban Stars (West)

Last appearance
- 1939, for the New York Cubans

Teams
- Cuban Stars (West) (1926–1930); Cuban Stars (East) (1932–1934); New York Cubans (1935); Cuban Stars (East) (1936); New York Cubans (1939)

Career highlights and awards
- All-Star (1939)

Justo Cándido López Fregueda (1906 – death unknown), known as Cando López, was a Cuban professional baseball center fielder and left fielder in the Negro leagues and briefly in Cuba in the 1920s and 1930s.

A native of Havana, Cuba, López made his Negro leagues debut in 1926 with the Cuban Stars (West). He played five seasons with the club, then went on to play for the Cuban Stars (East) and New York Cubans. López was selected to play in the East–West All-Star Game in 1939, his final season. Lopez also played briefly in the Cuban Winter League for Team Cuba in the 1927–28 season.
