= Willie Burns (baseball) =

American baseball player

- Pitcher
- Born: January 12, 1916; West Palm Beach, Florida, U.S.
- Died: February 10, 1966 (aged 50); West Palm Beach, Florida, U.S.
- Batted: Left Threw: Left

Negro league baseball debut
- 1935, for the Newark Dodgers

Last appearance
- 1945, for the New York Black Yankees

Teams
- Newark Dodgers (1935); Newark Eagles (1942); Chicago American Giants (1942); Baltimore Elite Giants (1943); Philadelphia Stars (1943); Indianapolis Clowns (1944); New York Cubans (1945); New York Black Yankees (1945)

William Tatum Burns (January 12, 1916 – February 10, 1966) was an American Negro league pitcher between 1935 and 1945.

A native of West Palm Beach, Florida, Burns made his Negro league debut in 1935 with the Newark Dodgers. He went on to play for several teams, finishing his career in 1945 with the New York Cubans and the New York Black Yankees. Burns died in West Palm Beach in 1966 at age 50.
