= Lincoln Williams (baseball) =

American baseball player

- Outfielder
- Born: December 23, 1917; Jacksonville, Florida, U.S.
- Died: January 7, 1995 (aged 77); Jacksonville, Florida, U.S.

Negro league baseball debut
- 1942, for the New York Cubans

Last appearance
- 1942, for the New York Cubans

Teams
- New York Cubans (1942)

Lincoln Chase Williams (December 23, 1917 – January 7, 1995) was an American Negro league outfielder in the 1940s.

A native of Jacksonville, Florida, Williams played for the New York Cubans in 1942. In 15 recorded games, he posted eight hits in 57 plate appearances. Williams died in Jacksonville in 1995 at age 77.
