= Thomas Saxon =

American baseball player

- Pitcher
- Batted: Right Threw: Left

Negro league baseball debut
- 1942, for the New York Cubans

Last appearance
- 1942, for the New York Cubans

Teams
- New York Cubans (1942)

Thomas Saxon is an American former Negro league pitcher who played in the 1940s.

Saxon played for the New York Cubans in 1942. In three recorded appearances on the mound, he posted a 3.72 ERA over 9.2 innings.
