= Pee Wee Jenkins =

American baseball player (1923–2002)

- Pitcher
- Born: March 15, 1923; Hampden Sydney, Virginia, U.S.
- Died: April 23, 2002 (aged 79); Farmville, Virginia, U.S.
- Batted: Right Threw: Right

Negro league baseball debut
- 1944, for the Indianapolis Clowns

Last appearance
- 1952, for the Birmingham Black Barons
- Stats at Baseball Reference

Teams
- Indianapolis Clowns (1944); New York Cubans (1946–1950); Birmingham Black Barons (1952); Indianapolis Clowns (1952)

James Edward Jenkins (March 15, 1923 – April 23, 2002), nicknamed "Pee Wee", was an American Negro league pitcher in the 1940s and 1950s. He played for the Indianapolis Clowns, New York Cubans, and Birmingham Black Barons.

A native of Hampden Sydney, Virginia, Jenkins went 2–2 on the mound for the 1947 Negro World Series champion New York Cubans.

Jenkins also pitched in the Provincial League for Three Rivers and in the Mandak League for Winnipeg.

Jenkins died in Farmville, Virginia in 2002 at age 79.
