= Rogelio Linares =

Cuban baseball player (born 1909)

- Outfielder / First baseman
- Born: September 20, 1909; La Habana, Cuba
- Batted: Left Threw: Left

Negro league baseball debut
- 1940, for the New York Cubans

Last appearance
- 1948, for the Diablos Rojos del México

Negro National League II statistics
- Batting average: .252
- Home runs: 4
- Runs batted in: 76

Teams
- New York Cubans (1940, 1943–1946); Alijadores de Tampico (1947); Diablos Rojos del México (1948)

Rogelio "Ice Cream" Linares (September 20, 1909 – ?) was a Cuban professional baseball outfielder and first baseman in the Negro leagues and in the Mexican League. He played from 1940 to 1948, with the New York Cubans, Alijadores de Tampico, and the Diablos Rojos del México.
