= Fernando Díaz (baseball) =

Cuban baseball player (born 1924)

- Outfielder / Second baseman / Third baseman
- Born: May 30, 1924; Marianao, Cuba
- Died: November 20, 1994 (aged 70); Villahermosa, Tabasco, Mexico
- Batted: Right Threw: Right

debut
- 1945, for the New York Cubans

Last appearance
- 1950, for the New York Cubans
- Stats at Baseball Reference

Teams
- New York Cubans (1945–1947, 1949–1950)

Career highlights and awards
- Negro League World Series champion (1947)

Fernando Díaz Pedroso (May 30, 1924 – November 20, 1994) was a Cuban professional baseball outfielder, second baseman and third baseman in Negro league baseball between 1945 and 1950.

A native of Marianao, Cuba, Díaz made his Negro leagues debut in 1945 with the New York Cubans. He played five seasons with the club through 1950, was selected to the East–West All-Star Game in 1946, 1949 and 1950, and was part of New York's 1947 Negro World Series championship squad. Díaz died in Villahermosa, Tabasco in 1994 at age 70.
