= Lino Donoso =

Cuban baseball player (1922–1990)

- Pitcher
- Born: September 23, 1922; Havana, Cuba
- Died: October 13, 1990 (aged 68); Veracruz, Veracruz, Mexico
- Batted: Left Threw: Left

Professional debut
- NgL: 1947, for the New York Cubans
- MLB: June 18, 1955, for the Pittsburgh Pirates

Last MLB appearance
- May 2, 1956, for the Pittsburgh Pirates

Career statistics
- Win–loss record: 9–8
- Earned run average: 3.86
- Strikeouts: 103
- Stats at Baseball Reference

Teams
- New York Cubans (1947); Pittsburgh Pirates (1955–1956)

Career highlights and awards
- Negro National League ERA leader (1947)

Member of the Mexican Professional

Baseball Hall of Fame
- Induction: 1988

Lino Donoso Galata (September 23, 1922 – October 13, 1990) was a Cuban professional baseball player who pitched in Major League Baseball for the Pittsburgh Pirates in 1955 and 1956. He also had a lengthy career in the Mexican League, and was elected to its Hall of Fame in 1988. He played one season (1947) in the Negro leagues.

A left-hander born in Havana, Donoso stood 5 feet 11 inches (1.80 m) tall and weighed 160 pounds (73 kg). His statistical line starts in 1947 with the New York Cubans of the Negro National League. Seven years later, at age 32, his "organized baseball" tenure began when he won 19 games and lost only eight, with an excellent 2.37 earned run average, for the 1954 Hollywood Stars of the Pacific Coast League, an Open Classification circuit at the highest level of minor league baseball. Donoso was selected to the PCL All-Star team.

He began 1955 with the Stars but was recalled to their parent team, the Pirates, in June. In his debut June 18, he allowed only two earned runs to the heavy-hitting Cincinnati Redlegs in a starting assignment at Crosley Field. But two Donoso errors led to two unearned runs and he was tagged with the 4–1 defeat. Later that season, Donoso went on to throw three complete game victories—all of them against the St. Louis Cardinals: a five-hit, 5–1 triumph at Forbes Field on July 16, a 4–3 victory, also at Forbes, on August 31, and a six-hit, 9–3 win at Busch Stadium on September 12. Those three games account for 75 percent of Donoso's MLB victories: his only other triumph came July 4 against the New York Giants, with a three-inning, one-hit, shutout relief appearance at Forbes Field, as Pittsburgh won, 4–3.

Donoso returned to the Pirate roster in 1956 but was used infrequently, getting into only 12/3 innings pitched in three relief appearances between April 20 and May 2. He was sent to Hollywood, then to the Triple-A Columbus Jets, before reaching the Mexican League, where he pitched through 1962.

In his 28 MLB games, Donoso compiled a 4–6 won–lost record, with one save, and a 5.21 earned run average in 962/3 innings pitched. He allowed 108 hits and 36 bases on balls, with 39 strikeouts. He died in Veracruz at age 68 in 1990.

== See also ==
- List of Negro league baseball players who played in Major League Baseball
