= Alejandro Crespo (baseball) =

Cuban baseball player (born 1915)

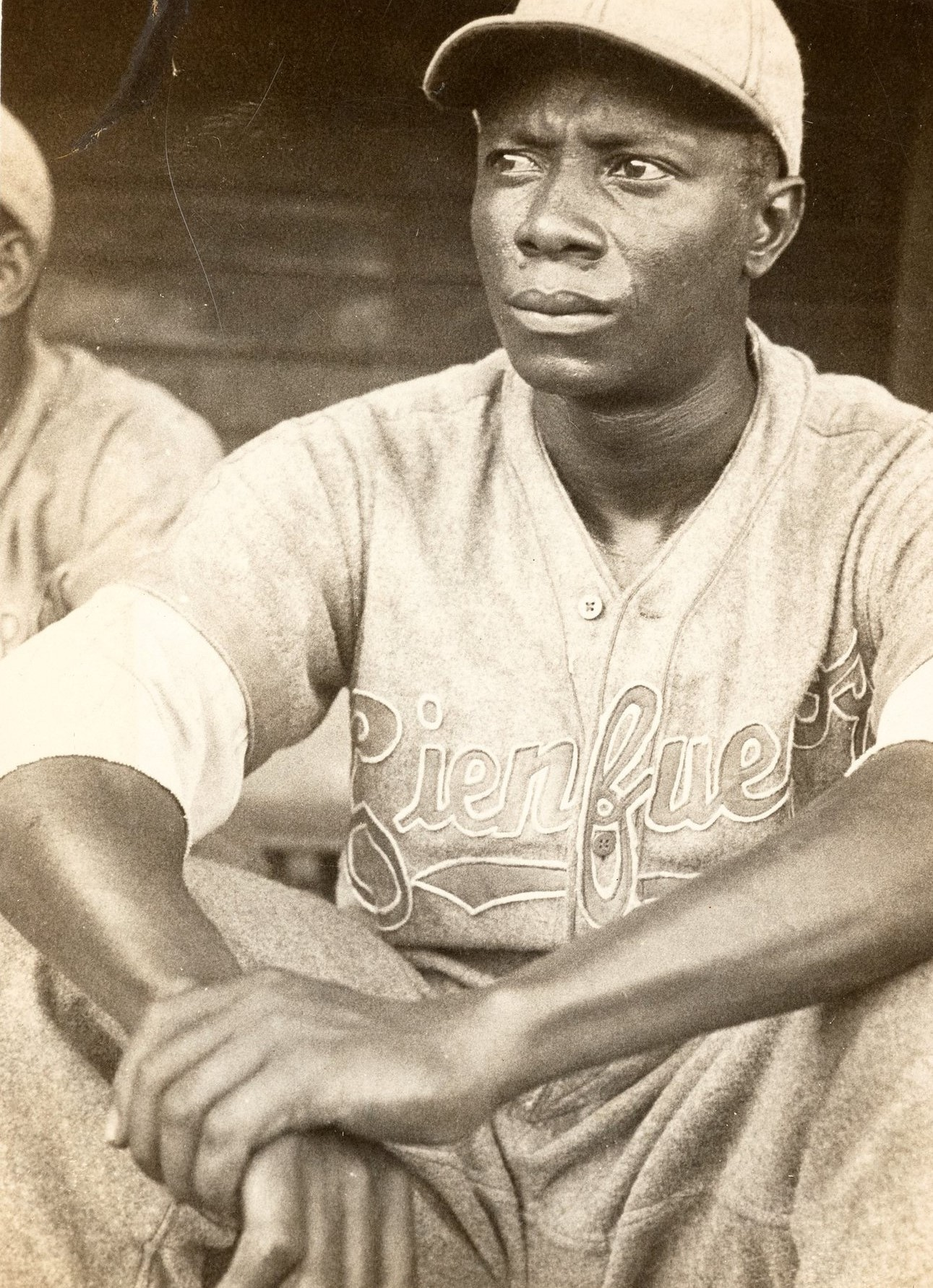
- Outfielder
- Born: February 26, 1915; Güira de Melena, Cuba
- Died: 1980; Havana, Cuba
- Batted: Right Threw: Right

Negro league baseball debut
- 1940, for the New York Cubans

Last appearance
- 1946, for the New York Cubans
- Stats at Baseball Reference

Teams
- New York Cubans (1940, 1946)

Alejandro Crespo Quiñónez (February 26, 1915 – 1980) was a Cuban professional baseball outfielder in the Negro leagues who played in the 1940s.

A native of Güira de Melena, Cuba, Crespo made his Negro leagues debut in 1940 with the New York Cubans, and was selected to play in that season's East–West All-Star Game. After spending several seasons in the Mexican League, he returned to New York for the 1946 season. In 1955, he played minor league baseball for the Charlotte Hornets.

Crespo died in Havana, Cuba in 1980.
