= Harry Williams (infielder) =

American baseball player

- Infielder
- Born: June 5, 1905; Sparks, Georgia, U.S.
- Died: May, 1964
- Batted: Right Threw: Right

Negro league baseball debut
- 1931, for the Indianapolis ABCs

Last appearance
- 1946, for the New York Black Yankees

Teams
- Indianapolis ABCs (1931); Pittsburgh Crawfords (1931–1932, 1937-1938); New York Black Yankees (1932, 1941–1944, 1946); Homestead Grays (1932-1934, 1939); Baltimore Black Sox (1933); Baltimore Elite Giants (1935, 1945); Brooklyn/Newark Eagles (1935-1936); New York Cubans (1936, 1946); Harrisburg Stars (1943)

Harry Lovett Williams (June 5, 1905 – May, 1964) was an American Negro league baseball infielder and manager in the 1930s and 1940s.

A native of Sparks, Georgia, Williams made his Negro leagues debut in 1931 with the Indianapolis ABCs and Pittsburgh Crawfords. He was a player-manager for the New York Black Yankees in 1944, and managed the team again in 1950. His brother Roy S. Williams also played in the Negro leagues. Williams died in 1964 at age 58.
