= Victor Greenidge =

Panamanian baseball player (born 1918)

- Pitcher
- Born: 21 November 1918; Panama City, Panama
- Batted: Right Threw: Right

Negro league baseball debut
- 1941, for the New York Cubans

Last appearance
- 1944, for the New York Cubans

Career statistics
- Win–loss record: 2–3
- Earned run average: 3.81
- Strikeouts: 19
- Stats at Baseball Reference

Teams
- New York Cubans (1941, 1944)

Victor Alexander Greenidge (born 21 November 1918) is a Panamanian former professional baseball pitcher who played in the Negro leagues in the 1940s. He was the first Panamanian ballplayer to play in a recognized major league.

A native of Panama City, Panama, Greenidge made his Negro leagues debut in 1941 with the New York Cubans. He played for the Panama national baseball team in 1943, and returned to the New York Cubans in 1944.
