= Lyman Bostock Sr. =

American baseball player

- First baseman
- Born: March 11, 1918; Birmingham, Alabama, U.S.
- Died: June 24, 2005 (aged 87); Birmingham, Alabama, U.S.
- Batted: Left Threw: Right

Negro leagues (Note: On December 16, 2020, Major League Baseball declared that seven Negro leagues, from the span of 1920–1948, were to be recognized as major leagues. Bostock's statistics reflect his time in the Negro leagues from 1922, 1924, 1929, and 1932–1948.) statistics
- Batting average: .326
- Hits: 125
- Runs batted in: 54
- Stats at Baseball Reference

Teams
- Birmingham Black Barons (1940–1942, 1946); Chicago American Giants (1947); New York Cubans (1948)

Career highlights and awards
- East-West All-Star Game (1941); Negro American League batting champion (1941)

Lyman Wesley Bostock Sr. (March 11, 1918 – June 24, 2005) was an American professional baseball player who played first base for several Negro league teams from 1938 to 1954. He batted left-handed and threw right-handed.

Bostock played for the Brooklyn Royal Giants, Birmingham Black Barons, Chicago American Giants, Jackie Robinson All-Stars, Winnipeg Buffaloes, and Carman Cardinals. He played in the 1941 East-West All-Star Game while with Birmingham and was credited with batting .466 in 23 games for what is considered the Negro American League batting championship. He then served in the US Army during World War II.

Like many Negro leaguers, Bostock wanted to play in Major League Baseball but never got the chance. Bostock played in or attended various MLB old-timers games in the 1970s and 1980s, including 1976 in Minnesota, and 1989 in Kansas City.

Bostock died in 2005, in his hometown of Birmingham.

His son, Lyman Bostock Jr., played for the Minnesota Twins and California Angels from 1975 until he was shot and killed in his hometown of Gary, Indiana, during the 1978 season.
