= Claro Duany =

Cuban baseball player (born 1917)

- Outfielder
- Born: August 12, 1917; Caibarien, Cuba
- Died: March 28, 1997 (aged 79); Evanston, Illinois, U.S.
- Batted: Left Threw: Left

debut
- 1944, for the New York Cubans

Last appearance
- 1952, for the Havana Cubans

Negro National League statistics
- Batting average: .392
- Home runs: 1
- Runs scored: 18
- Stats at Baseball Reference

Teams
- New York Cubans (1944, 1947); Industriales de Monterrey (1945–1946); Sherbrooke Athletics (1948–1949, 1951); El Águila de Veracruz (1950); Diablos Rojos del México (1951); Tampa Smokers (1952); Havana Cubans (1952)

Career highlights and awards
- All-Star (1947); Negro League World Series champion (1947)

Claro Duany Yedra (August 12, 1917 – March 28, 1997) was a Cuban professional baseball outfielder. He played from 1944 to 1952, including two major league seasons with the New York Cubans of the Negro leagues. An East–West All-Star in 1947, Duany was on the New York team that won the 1947 Negro World Series.

He won the Mexican League batting championship in 1945 and 1946 playing for the Industriales de Monterrey. He also won the Cuban League batting title in 1944–45 season, hitting .340.
