= Horacio Martínez (baseball) =

Dominican baseball player (born 1912)

- Shortstop / Second baseman
- Born: October 20, 1912; Santiago, Dominican Republic
- Died: April 14, 1992 (aged 79); Santo Domingo, Dominican Republic
- Batted: Right Threw: Right
- Stats at Baseball Reference

Teams
- New York Cubans (1935–36, 1940–47)

Horacio Antonio "Rabbit" Martínez Estrella (October 20, 1912 – April 14, 1992), nicknamed "Rabbit", was a Dominican professional baseball shortstop and second baseman in the Negro leagues. He played for the New York Cubans from 1935 to 1936 and 1940 to 1947.
