= Dave Thomas (baseball) =

American baseball player

- First baseman
- Born: March 22, 1905; Mobile, Alabama, U.S.
- Died: July 27, 1968 (aged 63); Mobile, Alabama, U.S.
- Batted: Left Threw: Left

Negro league baseball debut
- 1929, for the Birmingham Black Barons

Last appearance
- 1946, for the New York Cubans

Teams
- Birmingham Black Barons (1929); Baltimore Black Sox (1930–1932); New York Black Yankees (1932–1935); New York Cubans (1935–1936); Washington Black Senators (1938); Brooklyn Royal Giants (1940); New York Cubans (1942–1946)

David Thomas (March 22, 1905 – July 27, 1968), nicknamed "Showboat", was an American first baseman in the Negro leagues from 1929 to 1946.

A native of Mobile, Alabama, Thomas is considered one of the greatest defensive first basemen in Negro leagues history. In 1945 at age 40, he and Terris McDuffie were given a tryout by Branch Rickey and the Brooklyn Dodgers, two years prior to Jackie Robinson's breaking of the baseball color line.

Thomas died in Mobile in 1968 at age 63.
