= Pedro Ballester (baseball) =

Cuban baseball player

- Shortstop
- Born: October 23, 1924; Cárdenas, Cuba
- Batted: Right Threw: Right

Negro league baseball debut
- 1948, for the New York Cubans

Last appearance
- 1948, for the New York Cubans
- Stats at Baseball Reference

Teams
- New York Cubans (1948)

Pedro Ballester Pascual San Martin (October 23, 1924 – death date unknown) was a Cuban shortstop in Negro league baseball.

A native of Cárdenas, Cuba, Ballester played for the New York Cubans in 1948. He went on to play minor league baseball through the mid-1950s with such clubs as the Keokuk Kernels, Fond du Lac Panthers, and Sherbrooke Athletics. He also played in the Nicaraguan Professional Baseball League in 1956 with Indios del Bóer.
