= Lorenzo Cabrera =

Cuban baseball player (1920–1999)

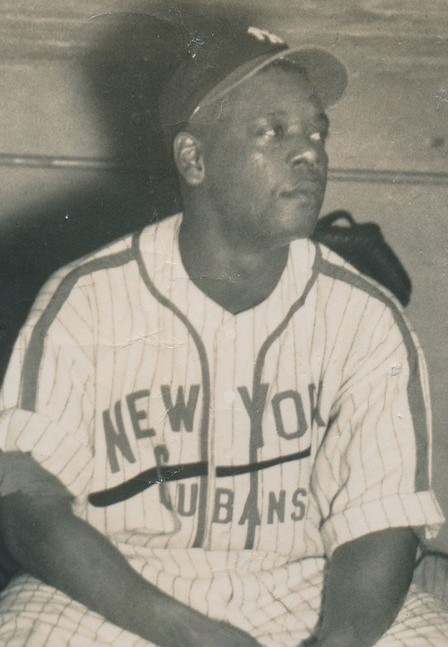
- First baseman
- Born: 30 April 1920; Cienfuegos, Las Villas, Cuba
- Died: 1999 (aged 78–79); Guanabacoa, Havana, Cuba
- Batted: Left Threw: Left

Negro National League debut
- 1947, for the New York Cubans

Last appearance
- 1956, for the Nogales Diablos Rojos
- Stats at Baseball Reference

Teams
- New York Cubans (1947–1948); Diablos Rojos del México (1950); Ottawa Giants (1951); Oakland Oaks (1951); Bryan / Del Rio Indians (1954); Port Arthur Sea Hawks (1955); Tijuana Potros (1956); Nogales Diablos Rojos (1956)

Career highlights and awards
- Negro League World Series champion (1947)

Lorenzo Cabrera (30 April 1920 – 22 June 1999), nicknamed "Chiquitín", was a Cuban professional baseball player. He played between 1947 and 1956. Born in Cienfuegos, Cuba on 30 April 1920, Cabrera died in 1999.

== Career ==
=== Cuban League ===
Cabrera played eleven seasons in the Cuban League making his debut in the 1942–43 season with Almendares, where he only had one at bat in one game. He did not play for the next three seasons, returning to play with Marianao in the 1946–47 season. He led the league in hits in 1950–51 with 88. In 1953–54 he played for Marianao and Habana. The next season he played with Habana and Cienfuegos. He did not play in 1955–56 and last played in 1956–57 for Cienfuegos.

=== Negro leagues ===
Cabrera made his Negro leagues debut in 1947 for the New York Cubans, where he played five seasons until 1950.

=== Mexican League ===
In 1950, Cabrera played for the Diablos Rojos del México of the Mexican League, winning the batting championship with a .355 batting average.

== Career statistics ==
=== Cuban League ===
Season	Team	G	AB	R	H	2B	3B	HR	RBI	SB	BA
1942–43	Almendares	1	1	0	0	0	0	0	0	0	.000
1946–47	Marianao	28	113	14	28	2	1	0	10	2	.248
1947–48	Marianao	47	170	18	43	5	1	0	8	2	.253
1948–49	Marianao	61	207	20	65	11	4	1	18	5	.314
1949–50	Marianao	63	227	26	75	16	5	0	31	6	.330
1950–51	Marianao	70	257	36	88	12	4	1	29	6	.342
1951–52	Marianao	55	205	23	61	12	5	1	21	1	.298
1952–53	Marianao	64	245	32	77	16	2	4	32	2	.314
1953–54	Marianao / Habana	71	291	41	92	15	3	5	33	3	.316
1954–55	Habana / Cienfuegos	57	189	25	56	10	5	0	17	1	.296
1956–57	Cienfuegos	24	100	11	31	2	0	0	11	1	.310
Total (11 seasons)		541	2005	246	616	10	30	12	210	29	.307

Source: Who's Who in Cuban Baseball

=== Mexican League ===
Season	Team	G	AB	R	H	2B	3B	HR	RBI	SB	BB	BA	SLG
1950	México	68	268	40	95	10	3	1	39	14	35	.354	.425

Source: Enciclopedia del Beisbol Mexicano
