= Carrenza Howard =

American Negro League Baseball player

- Pitcher
- Born: January 10, 1914; Daytona Beach, Florida, U.S.
- Died: February 1, 2003 (aged 89); Cerritos, California, U.S.
- Batted: Right Threw: Right

Negro league baseball debut
- 1940, for the New York Cubans

Last appearance
- 1947, for the Indianapolis Clowns

Career statistics
- Win–loss record: 10–19
- Earned run average: 5.93
- Strikeouts: 106
- Stats at Baseball Reference

Teams
- New York Cubans (1940–1946); Indianapolis Clowns (1947)

Career highlights and awards
- All-Star (1944)

Carrenza M. "Schoolboy" Howard (January 10, 1914 – February 1, 2003) was an American right-handed baseball pitcher in the Negro leagues. He played from 1940 to 1947, mostly with the New York Cubans and the Indianapolis Clowns.

While pitching with the Cubans in 1944, he was credited with a 24-4 record against all opponents, though in his first two years with the team, his league ledger shows marks of 0-1 and 2-1. Records note that most of the teams games were played during that time were non-league teams.

Howard was born in Daytona Beach, Florida. While attending Shaw University in Raleigh, North Carolina, he was a three-time letterman, thus earning his nickname, "Schoolboy."

His birthdate is sometimes listed as 1920.
