= Cleveland Clark =

Cuban baseball player (born 1919)

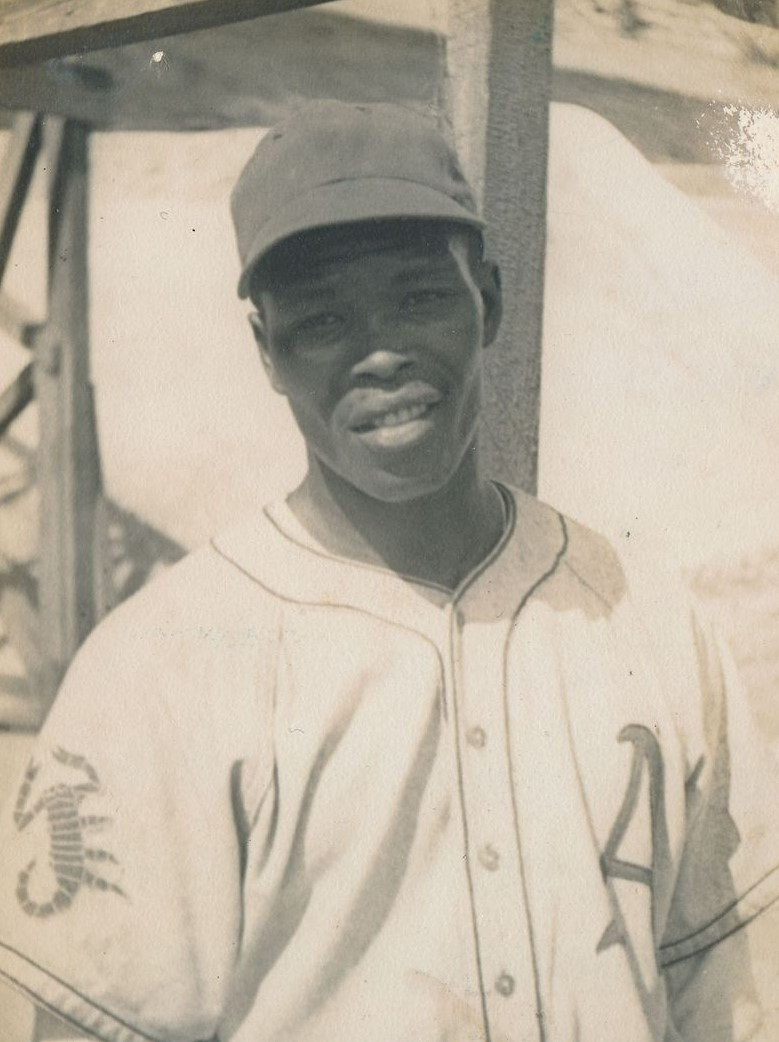
- Outfielder
- Born: July 14, 1919; Victoria de Las Tunas, Cuba
- Batted: Right Threw: Right

debut
- 1945, for the New York Cubans

Last appearance
- 1948, for the New York Cubans

Negro National League statistics
- Batting average: .232
- Home runs: 1
- Runs scored: 30
- Stats at Baseball Reference

Teams
- New York Cubans (1945–1948)

Career highlights and awards
- Negro League World Series champion (1947)

Cleveland "Chiflán" Clark Steele (born July 14, 1919) was a Cuban professional baseball outfielder who played in the Negro leagues. He played for the New York Cubans from 1945 to 1948. His nickname, Chiflán, means "shifty".
