= Silvio García =

Cuban baseball player (born 1913)

- Infielder / Pitcher / Left fielder
- Born: October 11, 1913; Limonar, Cuba
- Died: August 28, 1977 (aged 63); Matanzas, Cuba
- Batted: Right Threw: Right
- Stats at Baseball Reference

Silvio García Rendon (October 11, 1913 – August 28, 1977) was a Cuban professional baseball infielder, pitcher and left fielder in the Negro leagues, Mexican League, and minor leagues. He played professionally from 1930 to 1954 with several ballclubs, including the Diablos Rojos del México, Azules de Veracruz México and the New York Cubans.
