= Luis Tiant Sr. =

Cuban baseball player

- Pitcher
- Born: August 27, 1906; Havana, Cuba
- Died: December 10, 1976 (aged 70); Milton, Massachusetts, US
- Batted: Left Threw: Left

Negro leagues debut
- 1928, for the Havana Red Sox

Last Negro leagues appearance
- 1947, for the New York Cubans

Negro National League I, East–West League, & Negro National League II statistics
- Win–loss record: 37–28
- Run average: 3.60
- Strikeouts: 416
- Stats at Baseball Reference

Teams
- Havana Red Sox (1928); Cuban Stars West (1930); Cuban House of David/Pollock's Cuban Stars (1931–1932); New York Cubans (1935–1936, 1939–1940); Rojos del Aguila de Veracruz (1941); New York Cubans (1943–1947); Industriales de Monterrey (1948); Tuneros de San Luis (1948)

Career highlights and awards
- 2× All-Star selection (1935, 1947); 1947 Negro World Series champion; Negro National League strikeout leader (1935)

Luis Eleuterio Tiant Bravo (Spanish pronunciation: [ˈlwis ˈtjant]; August 27, 1906 – December 10, 1976), also known as Luis Tiant Sr., was a Cuban professional baseball pitcher in Negro league baseball, the Cuban League, the Mexican League, and in the Dominican Republic. He also performed with barnstorming teams.

== Career ==
Tiant's career extended from 1926 through 1948. In the Negro leagues, he played for the Havana Red Sox, Cuban Stars West, Cuban House of David/Pollock's Cuban Stars, and New York Cubans, between 1928 and 1947.

Tiant featured a screwball. Bill James and Rob Neyer ranked it the seventh-best screwball of all time.

== Personal life ==
Tiant's son, Luis Clemente Tiant, was a major league starting pitcher from 1964 to 1982. In August 1975, the elder Tiant and his wife were granted permission by Cuban leader Fidel Castro to visit the United States, so they could watch their son pitch in the major leagues. The Tiants' visit to the US is featured in the 2009 documentary film about their son, The Lost Son of Havana.

The elder Tiants remained in the US, and the elder Luis died 16 months later in Milton, Massachusetts. His wife died three days later. They were funeralized at St. Elizabeth Catholic Church in Milton.

He was often referred to as "Luis Tiant Sr." by contemporary press to differentiate him from his son.
