= 1947 Negro World Series =

Team (Wins)	Managers
New York Cubans (4)	José María Fernández
Cleveland Buckeyes (1)	Quincy Trouppe
- Dates: September 19–27
- Venues: New York: Polo Grounds (1); New York: Yankee Stadium (2); Cleveland: Cleveland Municipal Stadium (3); Philadelphia: Shibe Park (4); Chicago: Comiskey Park (5); Cleveland: League Park (6)

The 1947 Negro World Series was the championship tournament for the 1947 season of the Negro leagues. It was the sixth edition of the second incarnation of the Series and the tenth overall played. It was a best-of-seven playoff played between the Negro National League New York Cubans and the Negro American League Cleveland Buckeyes.

The Cubans won the Series in six games, winning four while having one game called a tie due to rain after six innings.

== Background ==
The Cleveland Buckeyes were making their second appearance in the World Series after winning the NAL pennant (they subsequently beat Washington in four games for the title). In a time where both leagues had teams play an uneven number of games, Cleveland had a winning percentage of .778 with their 42–12 record, which exceeded the Kansas City Monarchs (52–32, .619) for the pennant.

As for the Cubans, they had started play in the NNL in 1935 but had disbanded for two years before returning in 1939. They were part of a distinct history that had employed many international players that ranged beyond just Cuba, such as Puerto Rico. With a record and percentage of 43-19-1 (.694), they outmatched the Newark Eagles (50–38–1, .568).

This would ultimately prove to be the penultimate Series ever played by the two Negro leagues. Integration of black players into Major League Baseball in 1947 had shifted attention in the newspapers and crowds away from the Negro Leagues as defectors like Jackie Robinson and Larry Doby took center stage for the National League and American League.

Buckeyes Al Smith, Sam Jethroe, Quincy Trouppe, Webbo Clarke, and Sam Jones would join the major leagues in the following years while Cubans Minnie Minoso, Ray Noble, Pat Scantlebury, and Lino Donoso also joined the major leagues.

== Summary ==
New York won the series, 4–1 (one tie).

Game	Date	Score	Location	Time	Attendance
1	September 19	Cleveland Buckeyes – 5, New York Cubans – 5 (6 innings)	Polo Grounds	2:00	5,500
2	September 21	Cleveland Buckeyes – 10, New York Cubans – 7	Yankee Stadium	2:58	9,000
3	September 23	New York Cubans – 6, Cleveland Buckeyes – 0	Cleveland Stadium	—	6,000
4	September 24	Cleveland Buckeyes – 4, New York Cubans – 9	Shibe Park	1:57	1,739
5	September 26	New York Cubans – 9, Cleveland Buckeyes – 2	Comiskey Park	—	2,048
6	September 27	New York Cubans – 6, Cleveland Buckeyes – 5	League Park	—	4,500

== Matchups ==
=== Game 1 ===
Friday, September 19, 1947 N/A at Polo Grounds in New York, New York
Team	1	2	3	4	5	6	7	8	9	R	H	E
Cleveland	2	3	0	0	0	0	X	X	X	5	7	1
New York	0	1	0	1	3	0	X	X	X	5	8	3
Home runs: CLE: Johnnie Cowan (1); NYC: None; Attendance: 5,500; Boxscore

The first game of the series would end up proving very little, despite the potential for it. The Buckeyes chased the Cubans' starting pitcher in Dave Barnhill out after one inning on three runs in five hits, and they rocked Pat Scantlebury for two more runs for a total of five in two innings. However, Scantlebury settled down and allowed no further runner to score for the next four innings, and New York gradually chipped at the lead over the next few innings, which included three runs in the fifth off starter Chet Brewer. Both teams relied on chance hitting, since each had two extra base hits (Cleveland had five singles and New York had six). The best hitter of the day proved to be shortstop Silvio Garcia of the Cubans, who went 3-for-3 with an RBI and two runs. However, growing rain meant that the game was called a tie after six innings.

=== Game 2 ===
Sunday, September 21, 1947 2:58 at Yankee Stadium in New York, New York
Team	1	2	3	4	5	6	7	8	9	R	H	E
Cleveland	3	0	0	4	0	0	0	0	3	10	17	4
New York	2	0	1	4	0	0	0	0	0	7	10	3
WP: Doc Bracken (1–0) LP: Lino Donoso (0–1); Attendance: 9,000; Boxscore

=== Game 3 ===
Tuesday, September 23, 1947 N/A at Cleveland Stadium in Cleveland, Ohio
Team	1	2	3	4	5	6	7	8	9	R	H	E
New York	0	0	0	0	0	0	0	0	6	6	12	0
Cleveland	0	0	0	0	0	0	0	0	0	0	5	0
WP: Barney Morris (1–0) LP: Sam Jones (0–1); Attendance: 6,000; Boxscore

=== Game 4 ===
Wednesday, September 24, 1947 1:57 at Shibe Park in Philadelphia, Pennsylvania
Team	1	2	3	4	5	6	7	8	9	R	H	E
Cleveland	0	0	0	0	0	0	0	4	0	4	7	4
New York	0	0	1	0	6	0	1	1	X	9	12	0
WP: Dave Barnhill (1–0) LP: Gene Bremer (0–1); Home runs: CLE: Ray Noble (1); NYC: None; Attendance: 1,739; Boxscore

Catcher Ray Noble would help lead the Cubans to victory with a grand slam in the fifth inning as the Cubans went from a one-run lead to being up 7–0 as Cleveland did themselves no favors by committing four errors.

=== Game 5 ===
Friday, September 26, 1947 N/A at Comiskey Park in Chicago, Illinois
Team	1	2	3	4	5	6	7	8	9	R	H	E
New York	0	1	3	1	0	4	0	0	0	9	14	1
Cleveland	0	0	0	0	0	1	0	0	1	2	7	4
WP: Lino Donoso (1–1) LP: Chet Brewer (0–1); Attendance: N/A; Boxscore

=== Game 6 ===
Saturday, September 27, 1947 N/A at League Park in Cleveland, Ohio
Team	1	2	3	4	5	6	7	8	9	R	H	E
New York	0	0	0	0	0	3	1	2	0	6	8	1
Cleveland	2	1	1	0	1	0	0	0	0	5	9	4
WP: Pat Scantlebury (1–0) LP: Gene Smith (0–1); Attendance: 4,500; Boxscore

In the Series, Cleveland had a lead in the first two games, yet managed to win just once. Games 3–5 saw them lead in exactly zero innings, but Cleveland finally broke some ground to start Game 6 at home. They rocked Luis Tiant Sr. for three runs, as he faced just eight batters in two innings before being relieved by Pat Scantlebury. He held the ship mostly afoot despite Cleveland's lead swelling to 5–0. Scantlebury finished the game for New York with seven innings of relief, and the Cubans came alive in the sixth inning on the strength of two hits, a hit-by-pitch, and two straight errors to make it 5–3. Ultimately, they would make the best of two doubles and six singles to go with seven walks and four errors committed by Smith to score six runs in three innings as Cleveland (mustering three doubles on nine hits with only three walks) could only watch as the Cubans clinched the title. Three players in the game had three-hit games, which included Scantlebury (3 for 5), Willie Grace (3 for 4 while driving in four runs) and Leon Kellman (3 for 5).

New York was buoyed by two .400 hitters in the Series in Minnie Minoso (.423) and Claro Duany (.421), while only Leon Kellman hit exceptionally for Cleveland, leading the way with a .450 average.
