= Barney Morris =

American baseball player (1910–1962)

- Pitcher
- Born: June 3, 1910; Shreveport, Louisiana, U.S.
- Died: May 24, 1962 (aged 51); New York, New York, U.S.
- Batted: Left Threw: Right

Negro league baseball debut
- 1932, for the Monroe Monarchs

Last appearance
- 1948, for the New York Cubans

Teams
- Monroe Monarchs (1932); Bismarck Churchills (1935); Newark Eagles (1936); Kansas City Monarchs (1936); Cincinnati Tigers (1937); Pittsburgh Crawfords (1937–1938); Carta Blanca (1941); New York Cubans (1942–1948); Elmwood Giants (1951)

Career highlights and awards
- Negro Southern League strikeout leader (1932)

Barney Morris (June 3, 1910 – May 24, 1962) was an American professional baseball pitcher in the Negro leagues, the Mexican League, and the minor league Manitoba-Dakota League. He played in the Negro leagues in 1932, 1935–1938, and 1942–1948 for the Monroe Monarchs, Bismarck Churchills, Newark Eagles, Kansas City Monarchs, Cincinnati Tigers, Pittsburgh Crawfords, and the New York Cubans; in the Mexican league in 1941 for Carta Blanca; and in the Manitoba-Dakota League in 1951 for the Elmwood Giants. He died in New York in May 1962.

== Sources ==
- Riley, James A. (2002), The Biographical Encyclopedia of the Negro Baseball Leagues, New York: Carroll & Graf, pp. 569–70, ISBN 0-7867-0959-6
