= Lou Louden =

American baseball player

- Born: August 19, 1919; West Point, Virginia, U.S.
- Died: August 31, 1989 (aged 70); Newark, New Jersey, U.S.
- Batted: Right Threw: Right

debut
- 1941, for the Newark Eagles

Last appearance
- 1948, for the New York Cubans

Teams
- Newark Eagles (1941); New York Cubans (1942–1948)

Career highlights and awards
- Negro League World Series champion (1947)

Louis Oliver Louden (August 19, 1919 – August 31, 1989) was an American Negro league baseball player. He played for the New York Cubans, Birmingham Black Barons, and El Paso Texans between 1942 and 1957. This strong-armed catcher was a pull hitter who hit with consistency and good power, batting .290 for the 1947 Negro National Club champion New York Cubans. He was a superb catcher whose hustle and pep kept the other players on their toes and the fans pleased with his antics. He was noted to have a bit of a drinking problem and would sometimes show up to the games inebriated and had trouble at those ties fastening his shin guards, yet he could still catch a flawless game. A product of the New York playgrounds, he was discovered on the sandlots by Alex Pompez and came directly to the New York Cubans. He hit for averages of .229, .265, .247, and .250 in 1943–46. After the passing of Josh Gibson he played in three of the next found East-West All Star games, making appearances in 1947, 1948 and 1950. He also played on Willie Mays's All-Star team in 1948–49, the only member of the squad who was not playing in the major leagues. In addition, he played with Jackie Robinson's All-Stars in 1946–47, and during the early '50s with Roy Campanalla's All-Stars. In 1948, he served briefly as a manager with the Cubans' ballclub and hit .315, .245 and .311 in the next three seasons, his last in the negro leagues. He played winter ball in both Puerto Rico (1947–48), hitting .304 with Ponce, and in Cuba (1950–51), hitting .222 with Cienfuegos in limited play. After leaving the Cubans he played with Winnipeg in the Mandak league for two years (1952–53), batting .252 the latter season. His last appearance in organized baseball was in 1957, with El Paso in the Southwest League. Earlier in his career, before being discovered by Pompez, he played with teams of lesser status, including the Tidewater Giants from Newport News.
