= Minnie Miñoso =

Cuban-American baseball player (1924–2015)

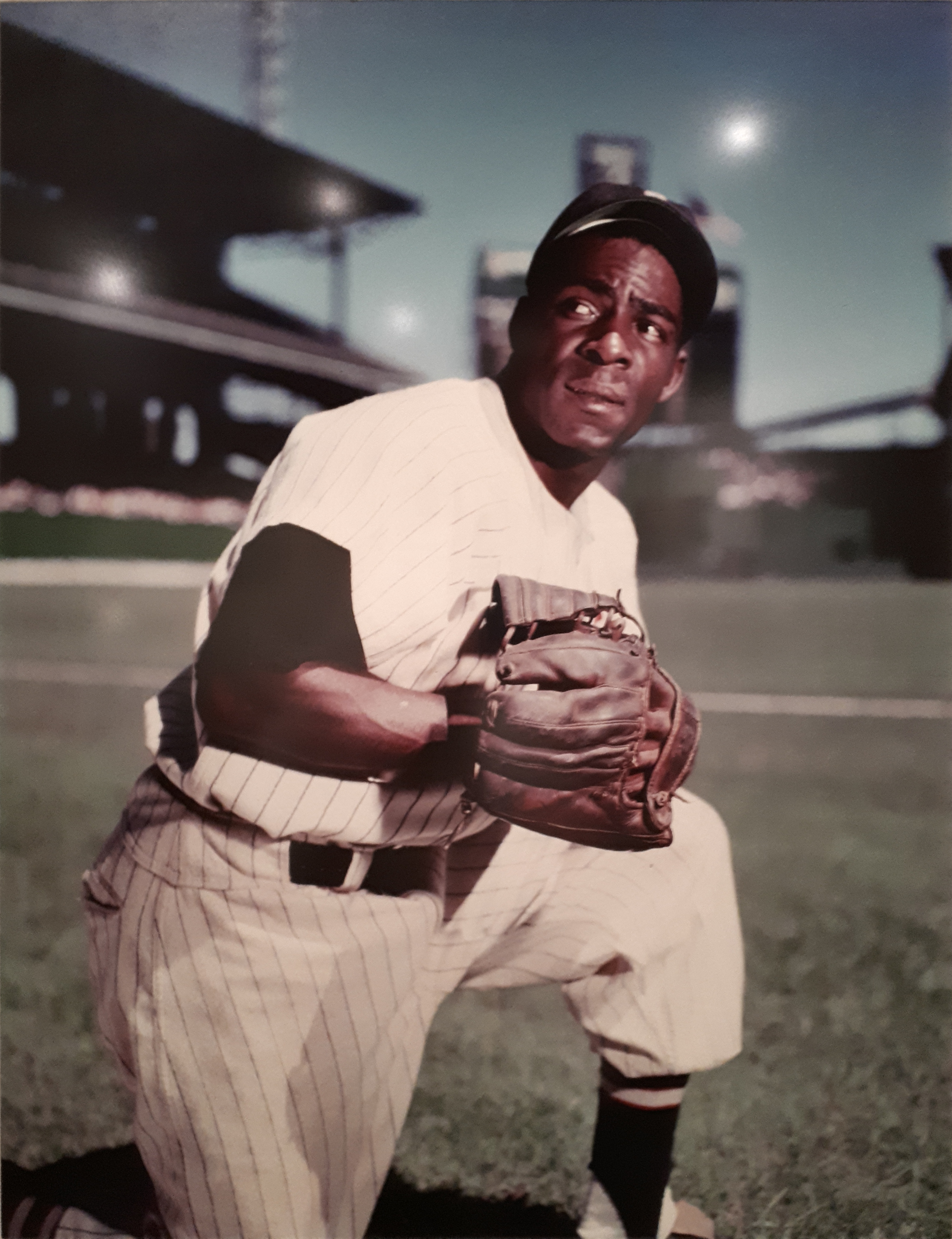
- Miñoso with the Chicago White Sox in 1951
- Left fielder
- Born: November 29, 1924; Perico, Cuba
- Died: March 1, 2015 (aged 90); Chicago, Illinois, U.S.
- Batted: Right Threw: Right

Professional debut
- NgL: 1946, for the New York Cubans
- MLB: April 19, 1949, for the Cleveland Indians

Last MLB appearance
- October 5, 1980, for the Chicago White Sox

MLB statistics
- Batting average: .299
- Hits: 2,113
- Home runs: 195
- Runs batted in: 1,089
- Stats at Baseball Reference

Teams
- New York Cubans (1946–1948); Cleveland Indians (1949, 1951); Chicago White Sox (1951–1957); Cleveland Indians (1958–1959); Chicago White Sox (1960–1961); St. Louis Cardinals (1962); Washington Senators (1963); Chicago White Sox (1964, 1976, 1980)

Career highlights and awards
- 2× NgL All-Star (1947–1948); 9× All-Star (1951–1954, 1957, 1959–1960²); Negro World Series champion (1947); 3× Gold Glove Award (1957, 1959, 1960); 3× AL stolen base leader (1951–1953); Chicago White Sox No. 9 retired

Member of the National

Baseball Hall of Fame
- Induction: 2022
- Vote: 87.5%
- Election method: Golden Days Era Committee

Saturnino Orestes "Minnie" Armas Arrieta Miñoso (/mɪˈnoʊsoʊ/, Spanish: [miˈɲoso]; November 29, 1924 – March 1, 2015), nicknamed "the Cuban Comet," was a Cuban professional baseball player. He began his baseball career in the Negro leagues in 1946 and became an All-Star third baseman with the New York Cubans. He was signed by the Cleveland Indians of Major League Baseball (MLB) after the 1948 season as baseball's color line fell. Miñoso went on to become an All-Star left fielder with the Indians and Chicago White Sox. The first Afro-Latino in the major leagues and the first black player in White Sox history, as a 1951 rookie, he was one of the first Latin Americans to play in an MLB All-Star Game.

Miñoso was an American League (AL) All-Star for seven seasons (Note: MLB held two All-Star Games from 1959 through 1962) and a Gold Glove winner for three seasons when he was in his 30s. He batted over .300 for eight seasons. He was the AL leader in triples and stolen bases three times each and in hits, doubles, and total bases once each. Willie Mays (179 steals) and Miñoso (167 steals) have been widely credited with leading the resurgence of speed as an offensive weapon in the 1950s. Miñoso was particularly adept at reaching base, leading the AL in times hit by pitch a record ten times, and holding the league mark for career times hit by pitch from 1959 to 1985. Miñoso, as a defensive standout, led the AL left fielders in assists six times and in putouts and double plays four times each. Miñoso was one of the most popular and dynamic players in White Sox franchise history. He helped the "Go-Go" White Sox become one of the premier teams of the 1950s and 1960s. A rare power threat on a team known for speed and defense, Miñoso also held the White Sox record for career home runs from 1956 to 1974.

Miñoso left the major leagues following the 1964 season, but went on playing and managing in Mexico through 1973. He rejoined the White Sox as a coach, and made brief but highly publicized player appearances in 1976 and 1980. He became the third player to get a hit after the age of 50 and the second player to appear in the major leagues in five different decades (Nick Altrock is the other). Miñoso's White Sox uniform number 9 was retired in 1983, and a statue of him was unveiled at U.S. Cellular Field in 2004. Miñoso was elected to the Cuban Baseball Hall of Fame in Exile in 1983, and to the Mexican Professional Baseball Hall of Fame in 1996. In August 2023, the former George B. McClellan Elementary School, in the Bridgeport neighborhood in Chicago, was renamed Minnie Miñoso Academy.

In 2014, Miñoso appeared for the second time as a candidate on the National Baseball Hall of Fame's Golden Era Committee election ballot for possible Hall of Fame consideration in 2015. He and the other candidates including former White Sox teammate Billy Pierce, and two other former players from Cuba, Tony Oliva and Luis Tiant, all missed induction in 2015. He and Oliva were elected to the Hall of Fame in 2021.

== Early life ==
Miñoso was born in Perico, Cuba near Havana, the son of Carlos Armas and Cecilia Arrieta. His date of birth is often cited as being November 29, 1923; however, his Republic of Cuba 1951 driver's license and his first Topps baseball card(s) 1952/195 list his date of birth as November 29, 1925. The Miñoso baseball card that was handed out by his family to visitors who stopped by to pay their respects for Miñoso at a remembrance held for him at a Chicago church before his funeral has printed on it "1924-2015".

His father worked in the fields of the sugarcane plantation on which the family lived. His mother had four other children from a previous marriage, and had the surname "Miñoso" from her first husband. While playing with his older brother Francisco, Orestes became referred to as a "Miñoso" too and he did not correct them. Later on, he would legally add "Miñoso" to his name when he became a U.S. citizen. Miñoso grew up playing baseball with two of his brothers and in fact managed his own team while working on his father's plantation, finding players and the necessary equipment himself. In 1941, he moved to Havana to live with his sister and play baseball there.

== Baseball playing career ==
=== Cuba and Negro leagues ===
Miñoso played professional baseball as a third baseman in Cuba and in the Negro leagues. He signed a contract with the team from the borough of Marianao in 1945 for $150 per month, and moved into the Negro leagues with the New York Cubans the next season and doubled his monthly salary. Batting leadoff for the Cubans, he hit .309 in 1946, and followed up with a .294 average in 1947 as they won the Negro World Series over the Cleveland Buckeyes. He was the starting third baseman for the East in the 1947 All-Star Game, and again in 1948.

Miñoso remained with the Cubans until signing with the Cleveland Indians organization during the 1948 season and starting his minor league career with the Dayton Indians of the Central League, batting .525 in 11 games.

=== Cleveland Indians ===
On April 19, 1949, Miñoso made his major league debut with the Cleveland Indians becoming the first Black Cuban in the major leagues; he drew a walk as a pinch hitter in the seventh inning of a 5–1 road loss to the St. Louis Browns. He got his first hit in his next game on May 4, a single off Alex Kellner in the sixth inning of a 4–3 win over the Philadelphia Athletics. The next day, he hit his first home run, off Jack Kramer in the second inning of a 7–3 win over the Boston Red Sox. Miñoso had little further chance to make an impression, however; the Indians were signing black players more aggressively than any other team in the American League, but coming off their victory in the 1948 World Series, they were the strongest team in baseball. They had little opportunity to get Miñoso into the lineup as a rookie, as they played Ken Keltner at third base, and he had only 16 at bats through May 13 before being sent to the minor leagues. Miñoso was sent to the San Diego Padres of the Pacific Coast League for the rest of the 1949 season and all of 1950, batting .297 the first year and following up with a .339 average and 115 runs batted in (RBIs).

Miñoso rejoined the Indians to start the 1951 season, but the team still could not find a spot for him in the lineup, as the Indians had Al Rosen at third base and Larry Doby, Dale Mitchell and Bob Kennedy in the outfield. He consequently had only 14 at bats in eight April games.

=== Move to the Chicago White Sox ===
On April 30, 1951, the Indians sent Miñoso to the White Sox in a three-team trade involving the Athletics, getting relief pitcher Lou Brissie from the Athletics in exchange. On May 1, Miñoso became the first black player on the White Sox, hitting a 415-foot (126 m) home run in Comiskey Park on the first pitch of his first at bat against the New York Yankees. He was an instant star, maintaining a batting average over .350 through most of the first half of the season, and finished the season hitting .324 – second in the AL behind the .344 mark of the Athletics' Ferris Fain. Miñoso was named for the first time to the AL All-Star roster (reserve player) becoming – along with White Sox teammate Chico Carrasquel and Washington Senators pitcher Connie Marrero – one of the first Latin Americans ever named to an All-Star team. That year, he scored 112 runs (one short of Dom DiMaggio's league leading total) in 138 games played, topping the league with 14 triples and 31 stolen bases as well as 16 times being hit by pitches, and became known as "Mr. White Sox". Following the 1951 season, he finished second in the AL's Rookie of the Year voting behind the Yankees' Gil McDougald, drawing a protest by the White Sox due to Miñoso having better statistics in nearly every category. Miñoso also finished fourth in the year's Most Valuable Player voting. Miñoso was regarded as such an outstanding all-around player that Yankees outfielder Mickey Mantle acquired the nickname "The Commerce Comet" because he reminded observers of "The Cuban Comet". When batting, Miñoso had a tendency to crowd the plate, which made him particularly susceptible to "beanball" pitches.

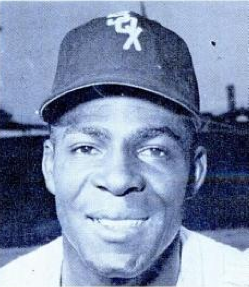
Miñoso with the White Sox in 1953

Miñoso followed up with several years of outstanding play for Chicago. He led the AL in steals in both 1952 (22) and 1953 (25), and topped the league with 18 triples and 304 total bases in 1954, appearing in the All-Star Game all three years and starting in 1954. On April 14, 1953, Opening Day, he provided the only hit for the Sox in a 4–0 loss to the Indians' Bob Lemon, and on July 4, 1954, he broke up a combined no-hitter by three Indians pitchers with two out in the ninth inning of a 2–1 loss. He led AL left fielders with three double plays in 1953, and the following year led all major league left fielders with 13 assists and three double plays. In the first game of a doubleheader on May 16, 1954, he drove in six runs in a 10–5 win over the Senators, and on April 23, 1955, he scored a career-high five runs in the White Sox' record-setting 29–6 road win over the Kansas City Athletics. Miñoso again finished second in the batting race in 1954 with a .320 mark, trailing the .341 average by the Indians' Bobby Ávila (Ted Williams, who did not have enough plate appearances to qualify, would have finished second given the needed at bats). On May 18, 1955, Miñoso suffered a skull fracture from being hit in the head by a pitch from the Yankees' Bob Grim in the first inning of an 11–6 loss. He finished the season with a .288 average, his lowest from 1953 through 1960; however, he had the longest hitting streak in the AL that year and the longest of his career, a 23-game string from August 9 to 30 during which he batted .421. In addition, his 18 assists that season were not only twice as many as any other left fielder in the major leagues, but also matched the highest mark by any AL left fielder from 1945 through 1983. He also led AL left fielders in putouts for the first time with 267.

Miñoso also represented a rare power threat for the Sox; due to the dimensions of Comiskey Park, the White Sox were the only major league team who did not have a player hit 100 home runs for them prior to World War II. On September 2, 1956, he hit his 80th home run with the Sox, off Hank Aguirre, in a 4–3 win over the Indians, breaking Zeke Bonura's team record. On September 23, 1957, in a 6–5 road loss to the Athletics, he became the first player to hit 100 home runs with the White Sox, connecting in the fourth inning off Alex Kellner. Miñoso topped AL left fielders again with 282 putouts and 10 assists in 1956, and with two double plays in 1957. He led the league in triples again in 1956 with 11, and in doubles with 36 in 1957. In the 1957 All-Star Game, he saved a 6–5 victory for the AL with a dramatic catch for the final out, with the tying run on second base. The 1957 season marked the first in which Gold Glove Awards were awarded, and Miñoso was chosen as the first honoree in left field (separate awards for both leagues were established the following year, and awards for each outfield position were discontinued for half a century after 1960 in favor of three awards for outfielders regardless of position).

=== Later seasons ===
==== Cleveland Indians ====
The White Sox traded Miñoso back to the Indians after the 1957 season in a four-player deal, with the White Sox getting pitcher Early Wynn and outfielder Al Smith in exchange for Miñoso and third baseman Fred Hatfield. With Cleveland, Miñoso hit a career high 24 home runs in 1958, and again led AL left fielders with 13 assists. He batted .302 in both 1958 and 1959, and on April 21, 1959, had a career-high five hits in a 14–1 road win against the Detroit Tigers, also driving in six runs for the second time in his career. He was involved in a notable incident in a road game against the Boston Red Sox on July 17 that year when Indians manager Joe Gordon was ejected after an interference call on the previous batter, but continued his argument instead of leaving the field; Miñoso refused to enter the batter's box while Gordon was still arguing, and became furious when plate umpire Frank Umont called him out on three strikes. Miñoso was then ejected after throwing his bat at Umont, but apologized profusely after the game, saying he was unaware of the rule that any pitch in that situation must be called a strike regardless of its location; he served a three-game suspension. That year, he led all major league left fielders with a career-high 317 putouts, and also led the AL again with 14 assists, and received his second Gold Glove Award. Also in 1959, he made another All-Star appearance, starting in left field on July 7, the first of two All-Star Games held that year (MLB played two All-Star Games from 1959 through 1962). He went 0 for 5 in the first game and didn't play in the second game on August 3.

==== Chicago White Sox ====
Miñoso was deeply disappointed over having missed playing for the White Sox during their 1959 pennant-winning season, and was thrilled to be traded back to Chicago in a seven-player deal in December, with Norm Cash being the top player sent in return. White Sox owner Bill Veeck presented Miñoso with an honorary 1959 pennant championship ring at the beginning of the 1960 season, saying that he had done as much as anyone in helping the White Sox reach the top of the league – partially through his influence in building a winning team, and partially because the Sox had acquired Wynn, who won the 1959 Cy Young Award, in exchange for Miñoso in the 1957 trade. Miñoso responded by driving in six runs for the third time in his career, hitting a grand slam in the fourth inning on Opening Day against the Kansas City Athletics, and giving the Sox a 10–9 victory with a walk-off home run leading off the bottom of the ninth. Minoso had his last great season in 1960 – he made his last All-Star appearances (starter in both games), led the AL with 184 hits, had 105 RBIs, batted over .300 for the eighth and final time, and finished fourth in the MVP vote for the fourth time. He also had perhaps his best defensive season, leading all major league left fielders in putouts (277), assists (14) and double plays (3) and winning his third and final Gold Glove Award.

==== St. Louis Cardinals ====
After the 1961 season, in which his average dropped to .280, Miñoso was traded to the St. Louis Cardinals in exchange for Joe Cunningham; Miñoso had led the AL in times hit by pitch every year since his rookie season, except 1955. After struggling to adjust to his new league's pitchers and strike zone, he missed two months of the 1962 season due to suffering a fractured skull and broken wrist from crashing into the outfield wall in the sixth inning of an 8–5 loss to the Los Angeles Dodgers on May 11, and finished the year hitting .196.

==== Washington Senators ====
His contract was sold to the Washington Senators prior to the 1963 season, and after hitting .229, he was released that October.

On October 12, he played in the first and only Hispanic American All-Star Game at New York's Polo Grounds.

==== Chicago White Sox ====
He signed with the White Sox before the 1964 campaign, but appeared in only 30 games that year, batting .226 — almost exclusively as a pinch hitter — and hit his last home run in the second game of a doubleheader on May 6 off Ted Bowsfield in the seventh inning of an 11–4 win over the Athletics. He retired after the 1964 season.

Starting in 1965, Miñoso played for the Charros de Jalisco of the Mexican League. Playing first base, he batted .360 in his first season, leading the league with 35 doubles and 106 runs scored. He continued to play in the Mexican League for the next eight seasons. He hit .265 with 12 home runs and 83 RBIs in 1973, when he was 47 years old.

=== Coaching and final appearances ===
In 1976, Miñoso was called out of retirement, becoming a first and third base coach for three seasons for the White Sox. He also made three game appearances for the Sox that September in games against the California Angels, picking up one single in eight at-bats (four coming as a designated hitter) — a two-out single off Sid Monge on September 12 in the second inning of a 2–1, 10-inning win, becoming, at age 52, the fourth oldest player ever to get a base hit in the major leagues. In 1980, Miñoso, age 56, was activated again to play for the White Sox, and was a pinch hitter in two games, again against the Angels. He became the fourth-oldest player ever to play in the majors, behind Nick Altrock, who at age 57, pinch hit in 1933, Charley O'Leary, who at age 58, pinch hit in 1934, and Satchel Paige, who at age 59, pitched three shutout innings in one game in 1965. Miñoso joined Altrock (1890s–1930s) as just the second player in major league history to play in five decades (1940s–1980s); out of the players who played in the major leagues in the 1940s, Miñoso was the last one to appear in a major league game. Bill Melton broke Miñoso's White Sox record of 135 career home runs in the second game of a doubleheader on August 4, 1974, a 13–10 win over the Texas Rangers; he had tied the record in the previous day's 12–5 loss. On August 29, 1985, Don Baylor broke Miñoso's AL record of being hit by pitches 189 times.

In 1990, Miñoso was scheduled to make an appearance with the minor league Miami Miracle of the Florida State League and become the only professional to play in six decades; however, MLB overruled the Miracle on the idea. When the last game was played at Comiskey Park during the same season, Miñoso was invited to present the White Sox lineup card to the umpires in the pregame ceremonies at home plate. He did so while wearing the new uniform debuted by the White Sox that day, his familiar number 9 on the back. In 1993, a 67-year-old Miñoso made an appearance with the independent St. Paul Saints of the Northern League. He returned to the Saints in 2003 and drew a walk, thus becoming the only player to appear professionally in seven different decades. The earlier extensions to his career with the Sox were publicity stunts orchestrated respectively by one-time Sox owner Bill Veeck and his son Mike, who at the time owned partial or controlling interest in the team.

== Later years and death ==
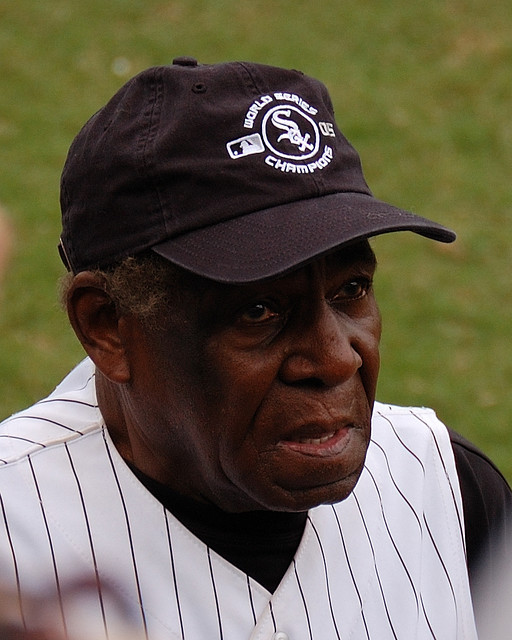
Miñoso in 2010

Miñoso lived in Chicago where he represented the Chicago White Sox as "Mr. White Sox." He had three children from his first marriage: Orestes Jr., Cecilia and Marilyn. The eldest, son Orestes Jr., briefly played professional baseball. Minoso married Edilia Delgado in Havana in 1961; they had a son, William. He married Sharon Rice in the 1990s and they had one son, Charles.

He became a member of the Chicagoland Sports Hall of Fame in 1994, the Mexican Professional Baseball Hall of Fame in 1996, the Hispanic Heritage Baseball Museum Hall of Fame on August 11, 2002, and the Cuban Baseball Hall of Fame in 2014. Miñoso was inducted into the Baseball Reliquary's Shrine of the Eternals in 2002.

On September 19, 2004, Minnie Miñoso Day was celebrated at U.S. Cellular Field and there was a pregame unveiling of a Minnie Miñoso statue at the field. Miñoso received the 2011 Jerome Holtzman Award from the Chicago Baseball Museum.

=== Death ===
Miñoso died March 1, 2015, from a torn pulmonary artery resulting from chronic obstructive pulmonary disease. He was 90 years old. A funeral service was held for him at Holy Family Church in Chicago on March 7, with over 1,000 dignitaries, officials, friends and fans in attendance.

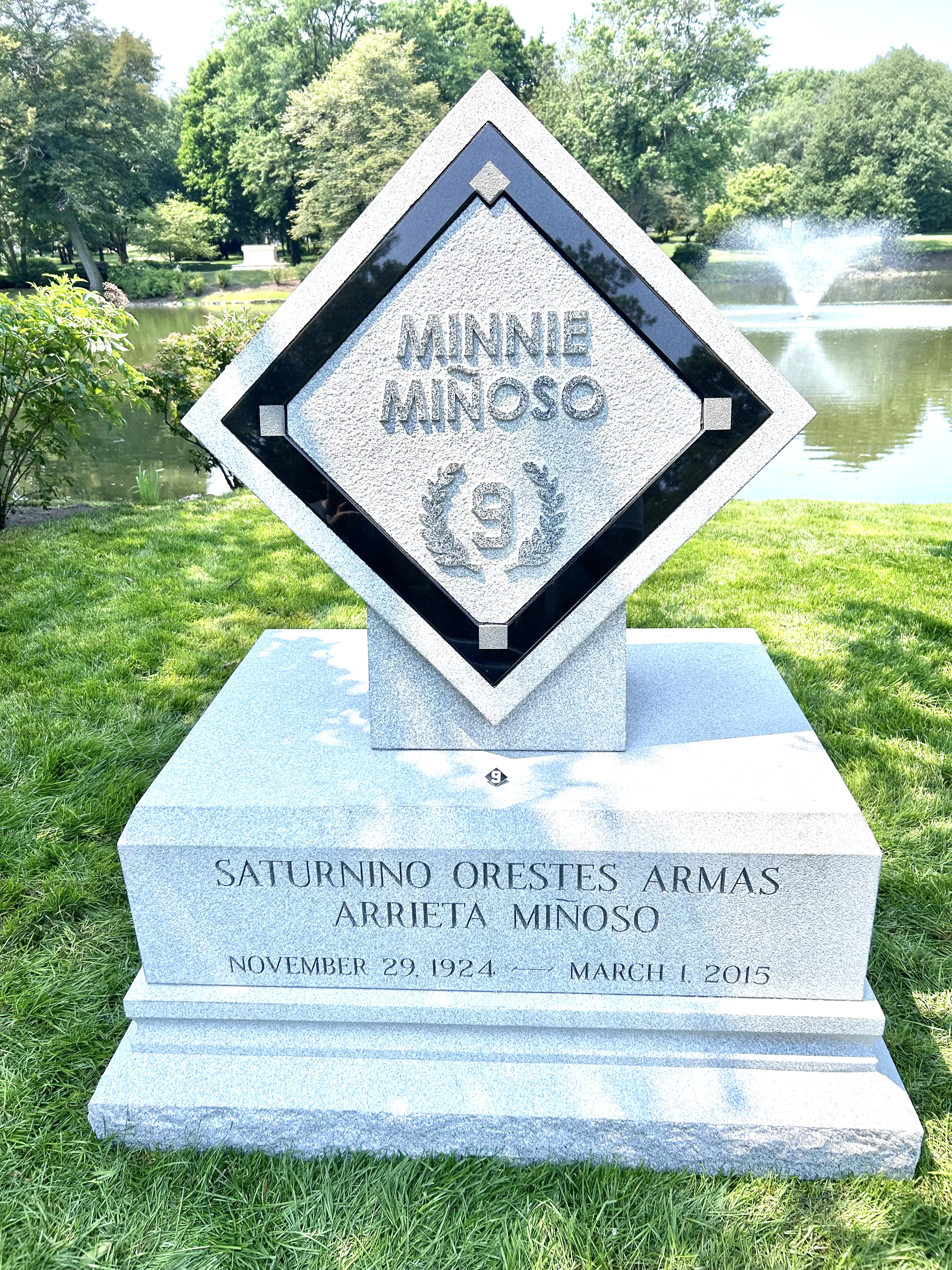
Miñoso is buried at Graceland Cemetery in Chicago. A gravesite monument was unveiled in July 2024.

"For South Siders and Sox fans all across the country, including me, Minnie Miñoso is and will always be ‘Mr. White Sox,’" President Barack Obama said in a statement released by the White House.

Miñoso is buried at Chicago's historic Graceland Cemetery and his graveside monument, in the shape of a baseball diamond, was unveiled in July 2024. Miñoso’s memorial is nearby that of Cubs Hall of Famer Ernie Banks. The pair died weeks apart in early 2015.

== Hall of Fame candidacy ==
Miñoso became eligible for election to the National Baseball Hall of Fame in 1970 – a year before the Hall began considering players from the Negro Leagues or taking into account the accomplishments of major leaguers in the Negro Leagues – and was dropped from the ballot for insufficient support. He was restored to the ballot five years after his final 1980 appearances as a player, and finally began to receive support as a candidate, remaining on the ballot for 14 years before his eligibility expired; however, most of the writers voting by that point had little memory of him during his prime. In 2001, historian Bill James selected Miñoso as the tenth greatest left fielder of all time; based on the then-general belief that Miñoso was born in 1922 rather than 1925, James wrote, "Had he gotten the chance to play when he was 21 years old, I think he'd probably be rated among the top thirty players of all time."

Author Stuart Miller makes the case for Miñoso's election based on the wins above replacement (WAR) statistic, which calculates the number of additional wins a team would get from a player's production compared to having played a replacement-level minor league player at the position. Miñoso is among the top five AL players in WAR for seven of his MLB seasons, ranking first in WAR for two of those seasons. Jay Jaffe of Sports Illustrated has written that Miñoso's Hall of Fame candidacy may have been damaged by the publicity stunt game appearances in his later life. He said that the biggest question for Hall of Fame voters would be how much potential major league production was taken away from Miñoso because baseball was not integrated at the outset of his career.

=== Golden Era candidate ===
Miñoso was selected to be on the Hall of Fame's Golden Era Committee election ballot in 2011 and 2014. Since 2011, the Baseball Writers' Association of America's (BBWAA) Historical Overview Committee serves as the Hall's screening committee every three years to identify ten long-retired players, managers, umpires, or executives (living or deceased) from the "Golden Era" (1947–1973) for possible induction into the Hall of Fame . In order to be inducted, any of ten candidates on the ballot must receive at least 12 of 16 votes cast by the 16-member Golden Era Committee at the MLB Winter Meeting in December. In 2011 and 2014, Miñoso received 9 and 8 votes; in 2011, only Ron Santo with 15 votes was elected to the Hall of Fame (inducted 2012). In 2014, none of the candidates were elected by the committee. He was voted into the Baseball Hall of Fame on December 5, 2021. He was formally inducted on July 24, 2022, with his widow Sharon speaking on his behalf.

== MLB stats, awards, and achievements ==
Years	Games	PA	AB	Runs	Hits	2B	3B	HR	RBI	SB	BB	SO	OBP	SLG	BA	Fld%
20	1,948	8,233	7,059	1,228	2,113	365	95	195	1,089	216	848	584	.387	.461	.299	.965

- East-West All-Star Game: 1947, 1948 (two games each)
- Sporting News Rookie of the Year: 1951 (Chicago AL, OF)
- MLB All-Star: 1951–1954, 1957, 1959 (two games), 1960 (two games)
- Gold Glove: 1957 (Outfield), 1959 (AL-Outfield), 1960 (AL-Outfield)
- AL leader in hits (1960)
- AL leader in doubles (1957)
- AL leader in triples (1951, 1954, 1956)
- AL leader in sacrifice flies (1960, 1961)
- AL leader in stolen bases (1951–1953)
- AL leader in times on base and total bases (1954)
- Chicago White Sox All-Century Team (2000)

== See also ==
- List of Afro-Latinos
- List of first black Major League Baseball players
- List of Major League Baseball annual stolen base leaders
- List of Major League Baseball annual doubles leaders
- List of Major League Baseball annual triples leaders
- List of Major League Baseball career runs batted in leaders
- List of Major League Baseball career runs scored leaders
- List of Major League Baseball career stolen bases leaders
- List of Major League Baseball players from Cuba
- List of Major League Baseball players who played in four decades
- List of Negro league baseball players who played in Major League Baseball
