= Pat Scantlebury =

Panamanian baseball player (1917–1991)

- Pitcher
- Born: November 11, 1917; Gatún, Panama Canal Zone
- Died: May 24, 1991 (aged 73); Glen Ridge, New Jersey, U.S.
- Batted: Left Threw: Left

Professional debut
- NgL: 1944, for the New York Cubans
- NL: April 19, 1956, for the Cincinnati Redlegs

Last MLB appearance
- August 3, 1956, for the Cincinnati Redlegs

Major league (Note: On December 16, 2020, Major League Baseball declared certain Negro leagues to be major leagues. Scantlebury's statistics reflect his time in the Negro leagues from 1944–1948.) statistics
- Win–loss record: 27–20
- ERA: 3.75
- Strikeouts: 191
- Stats at Baseball Reference

Teams
- New York Cubans (1944–1950); Cincinnati Redlegs (1956)

Career highlights and awards
- Negro World Series champion (1947); 3× NgL All-Star (1946, 1949–1950)

Patricio Athelstan Scantlebury (November 11, 1917 – May 24, 1991) was a Panamanian professional baseball pitcher whose 16-season career spanned Major League Baseball and the Negro leagues. He played six seasons with the Negro league New York Cubans, and later pitched six games for the 1956 Cincinnati Redlegs. Born in Gatún in the Panama Canal Zone, Scantlebury threw and batted left-handed, stood 6 feet 1 inch (1.85 m) tall and weighed 180 pounds (82 kg).

== Career ==
Scantlebury pitched with the Panama national baseball team at the 1941 Amateur World Series held in Havana; Panama finished the tournament with a 5–3 record. He also pitched in the 1943 Amateur World Series, leading his team with a 2.05 ERA.

His professional career begins at age 26 in 1944 in the Negro leagues, when he was considered Panama's first professional baseball star on foreign soil. He was a member of the New York Cubans for seven years, spent 1951 and 1952 out of pro baseball, then at age 35 he joined minor league baseball in 1953, where he led the Class B Big State League in games won (24) and strikeouts (177). The following year he won a combined 20 games in higher classifications, including 18 in the Double-A Texas League.

He became a member of the Cincinnati organization when the Redlegs affiliated with the Havana Sugar Kings of the Triple-A International League in 1955. That year, Scantlebury won 13 games and posted a strong 1.90 earned run average, leading to his promotion to Cincinnati the following season. He made his Major League debut on April 19, 1956, at the age of 38 years, 160 days. Given a start against the St. Louis Cardinals at Crosley Field in his club's second game of the regular season, he went five innings, allowing four earned runs on eight hits, including home runs to Stan Musial and Bill Sarni. He departed with none out in the sixth and St. Louis ahead 5–3, but Redlegs would rally to win 10–9 in extra innings. Five days later, against the Cardinals at Busch Stadium, he started for his second and final time, working four innings and allowing three runs on a homer by Ken Boyer; they were enough to pin the 5–3 defeat on Scantlebury, his only MLB decision. He pitched in four other games in relief for the 1956 Redlegs through August, and spent part of the year with their Seattle Rainiers affiliate in the Open-Classification Pacific Coast League.

In his one-season, six-game MLB trial, Scantlebury allowed 24 hits (including five homers), 14 runs (all earned), and five bases on balls in 19 total innings pitched. He struck out ten.

== Later life ==
He returned to the International League in 1957 and got into over 200 total games over the next five seasons, and posted double-digit victory seasons from 1957 to 1959. He retired from baseball at age 43 in 1961, and died in Glen Ridge, New Jersey, at the age of 73 in 1991.

== See also ==
- List of Negro league baseball players who played in Major League Baseball
