= José María Fernández =

Cuban baseball player and manager (born 1896)

José Fernández
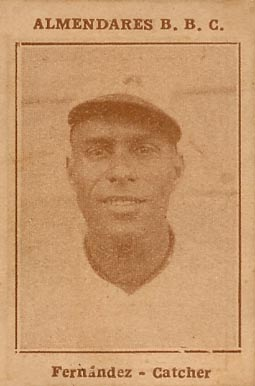
- Catcher / First baseman / Right fielder / Manager
- Born: June 6, 1896; Guanabacoa, Cuba
- Died: July 20, 1972 (aged 76); Guanabacoa, Cuba
- Batted: Right Threw: Right

Negro league baseball debut
- 1916, for the Cuban Stars (East)

Last appearance
- 1946, for the New York Black Yankees

Career statistics
- Batting average: .274
- Hits: 353
- Managerial record: 280–326–18
- Stats at Baseball Reference
- Managerial record at Baseball Reference

Teams
- As player: San Francisco Park (1915); Cuban Stars (East) (1916–1920); Almendares (1918, 1923, 1927); All Cubans (1921); Cuban Stars (East) (1922–1929); Gilkerson's Union Giants (1930); Chicago American Giants (1930); Cuban Stars (East) (1931–1937); New York Cubans (1939–1942, 1944, 1947); As manager: Cuban Stars (East) (1928–1929, 1932); New York Cubans (1939–1950)

Career highlights and awards
- Negro World Series champion (1947)

José María Tranquilino Fernández Marín Sr. (June 6, 1896 – July 20, 1972) was a Cuban professional baseball catcher, first baseman, right fielder and manager in the Negro leagues from the 1910s to the 1940s.

A native of Guanabacoa, Cuba, Fernández was the brother of fellow Negro leaguer Rudy Fernández. He managed the New York Cubans for 12 consecutive seasons from 1939 to 1950. Fernández died in Guanabacoa in 1972 at age 76.
