= Negro National League (1933–1948) =

American professional baseball league

- Classification: Major league
- Sport: Negro league baseball
- First season: 1933
- Folded: 1948
- No. of teams: ~18
- Country: United States
- Most titles: Homestead Grays (10)

The second Negro National League (NNL II) was one of the several Negro leagues that were established during the period in the United States when organized baseball was segregated. The league was founded in 1933 by businessman Gus Greenlee of Pittsburgh.

== League history ==
The second Negro National League was established in 1933 by Gus Greenlee, an African-American businessman of Pittsburgh, Pennsylvania, two years after the first Negro National League had disbanded, after the start of the Great Depression. The second Negro National League lasted until 1948, the year after Major League Baseball integrated. After that, its surviving teams merged into the Negro American League.

To distinguish between the two Negro National Leagues, they are usually referred to as the first Negro National League (NNL I) and the second Negro National League (NNL II).

== Negro National League franchises ==
Annual final standings: 1933, 1934, 1935, 1936, 1937, 1938, 1939, 1940, 1941, 1942, 1943, 1944, 1945, 1946, 1947, 1948

- Baltimore Black Sox (I) (1933)
- Brooklyn Royal Giants (1933)
- Cole's American Giants (1933–1935)
- Columbus Blue Birds / Akron Grays / Cleveland Giants (1933) – moved during season
- Indianapolis ABC's (II) / Detroit Stars (II) (1933) – moved to Detroit in April
- Nashville Elite Giants (1933–1934) / Columbus Elite Giants (1935) / Washington Elite Giants (1936–1937) / Baltimore Elite Giants (1938–1948)
- Pittsburgh Crawfords (1933–1938)
- Philadelphia Bacharach Giants (1934)
- Cleveland Red Sox (1934)
- Baltimore Black Sox (II) (1934)
- (Washington) Homestead Grays (1934–1948)
- †Newark Dodgers (1934–1935) / Newark Eagles (1936–1948)
- Philadelphia Stars (1934–1948)
- †Brooklyn Eagles (1935)
- New York Cubans (1935–1936; 1939–1948)
- New York Black Yankees (1936–1948)
- Washington Black Senators (1938)

†The Brooklyn Eagles and Newark Dodgers merged to form the Newark Eagles in 1936.

=== Member timeline ===
- 1933: Formation of the second Negro National League, consisting of 7 teams — Baltimore Black Sox, Cole's American Giants, Columbus Blue Birds, Indianapolis ABCs (II) (moved to Detroit in April), Homestead Grays, Nashville Elite Giants and Pittsburgh Crawfords; Homestead was expelled early in the season for raiding Detroit's roster, Columbus was replaced mid-season by the Akron Grays who were then replaced by the Cleveland Giants.
- 1934: Dropped Cleveland Giants, Detroit Stars, Baltimore Black Sox (I); Added Philadelphia Bacharach Giants, Cleveland Red Sox, Philadelphia Stars and Baltimore Black Sox (II); Retained Homestead Grays as an associate team.
- 1935: Dropped Philadelphia Bacharach Giants, Baltimore Black Sox (II) and Cleveland Red Sox; Added Brooklyn Eagles, Homestead Grays, New York Cubans and Newark Dodgers.
- 1936: Dropped Cole's American Giants; Brooklyn and Newark merged.
- 1937: Dropped New York Cubans; Added New York Black Yankees.
- 1938: Added Washington Black Senators.
- 1939: Dropped Pittsburgh Crawfords and Washington Black Senators; Re-added New York Cubans.
- 1948: League disbanded after completion of season; All teams continued on with Baltimore, Philadelphia, Newark and New York Cubans joining the Negro American League for the 1949 season, while the Grays and Black Yankees playing independent of a league.

== League champions ==
=== Pennant winners ===
From 1937 and 1938, 1940, and 1942 through 1946, the team in first place at the end of the season was declared the pennant winner (league champion). Due to the unorthodox nature of the schedule (and little incentive to enforce it), some teams frequently played many more games than others did in any given season. In 1933, Cole's Chicago American Giants claimed the first half title, but the Pittsburgh Crawfords won the second half and had an overall better record. The following year saw the Stars have a better winning percentage that saw them compete against the third place Chicago team despite the fact Pittsburgh played (and won) more games. This led to some disputed championships and two teams claiming the title. Generally, the team with the best winning percentage (with some minimum number of games played) was awarded the pennant, but other times it was the team with the most victories. The "games behind" method of recording standings was uncommon in most black leagues.

Year	Winning team	Manager	Reference
1933	Pittsburgh Crawfords	Oscar Charleston	
1934†	Philadelphia Stars	Webster McDonald	
1935†	Pittsburgh Crawfords (2)	Oscar Charleston	
1936	Pittsburgh Crawfords (3)	Oscar Charleston	
1937	Homestead Grays	Vic Harris	
1938	Homestead Grays (2)	Vic Harris	
1939†	Baltimore Elite Giants	Felton Snow	
1940	Homestead Grays (3)	Vic Harris	
1941†	Homestead Grays (4)	Vic Harris	
1942	Homestead Grays (5)	Vic Harris	
1943	Homestead Grays (6)	Candy Jim Taylor	
1944	Homestead Grays (7)	Candy Jim Taylor	
1945	Homestead Grays (8)	Vic Harris	
1946	Newark Eagles	Biz Mackey	
1947	New York Cubans	José Fernández	
1948†	Homestead Grays (9)	Vic Harris	

† – Pennant was decided via a split-season schedule with the winner of the first half of the season playing the winner of the second half of the season.
* – Pennant was decided via a 2-round play-off between the top four teams.
‡ – Pennant winner went on to play in the Negro World Series.

=== League play-offs ===
On five occasions, the League held a postseason series to determine the pennant champion.

1933 would have been the first to match the first and second half champions, but the Pittsburgh Crawfords were instead awarded the pennant over the first half champion Chicago American Giants. 1936 had an array of games that may or may not have been formal postseason games. For example, the Washington Elite Giants won the first half after beating the Philadelphia Stars 7–5 in a one-game match on September 17. Pittsburgh (who had a better record overall) faced the Newark Eagles from September 12–15 and won 3–1–1 in either a second-half playoff or a regular series-turned-playoff. Washington and Pittsburgh played three games from September 21–27, but no box scores exist for the games (which Pittsburgh won two of three) in a series that was evidently abandoned.

In one year (1939), the top four teams (Homestead Grays, Newark Eagles, Baltimore Elite Giants, Philadelphia Stars) were matched together in a best-of-five tournament. The Grays beat the Stars in five games while the Elite Giants beat the Eagles in four games to set up the Championship Series. The New York Cubans won the second half of the 1947 season but advanced to the Negro World Series over the Newark Eagles (first half champions). 1948 ended prematurely after a controversial finish to a disputed tie game in the third game.

Year	Winning team	Games	Losing team	Reference
1934	Philadelphia Stars (second half)	4–3–(1)	Chicago American Giants (first half)	
1935	Pittsburgh Crawfords (first half)	4–3	New York Cubans (second half)	
1939	Baltimore Elite Giants (third place)	3–1–(1)	Homestead Grays (first place)	
1941	Homestead Grays (first half)	3–1	New York Cubans (second half)	
1948	Homestead Grays (second half)	2–1–(1)	Baltimore Elite Giants (first half)	

=== Negro World Series ===
For the duration of the league, a Negro World Series took place seven times, from 1942 through 1948. The Negro National League's pennant winner met the champion of the rival Negro American League. Five out of the seven years, the Negro National League team (below in bold) prevailed.

- 1942 – Kansas City Monarchs beat **Washington Homestead Grays**, 4 games to 0 games
- 1943 – **Washington Homestead Grays** beat Birmingham Black Barons, 4 games to 3 games
- 1944 – **Washington Homestead Grays** beat Birmingham Black Barons, 4 games to 1 game
- 1945 – Cleveland Buckeyes beat **Washington Homestead Grays**, 4 games to 0 games
- 1946 – **Newark Eagles** beat Kansas City Monarchs, 4 games to 3 games
- 1947 – **New York Cubans** beat Cleveland Buckeyes, 4 games to 1 game
- 1948 – **Washington Homestead Grays** beat Birmingham Black Barons, 4 games to 1 game

== Sources ==
- Holway, John B. (2001), The Complete Book of Baseball's Negro Leagues: The Other Half of Baseball History, Fern Park, Florida: Hastings House, ISBN 0-8038-2007-0
