= New York Cubans =

Former professional baseball team

Information
- League: Negro National League (II) (1935–1936, 1939–1948); Negro American League (1949–1950)
- Location: New York City
- Ballpark: Hinchliffe Stadium (Paterson) (1935–1936); Polo Grounds (New York City) (1939-50) Dyckman Oval (New York City) (1935-36); Yankee Stadium (New York City) (1941-46)
- Established: 1935
- Disbanded: 1950
- Negro World Series championships: 1947
- League titles: 1947

The New York Cubans were a Negro league baseball team that played during the 1930s and from 1939 to 1950. Despite playing in the Negro leagues, the team occasionally employed white-skinned Hispanic baseball players as well, because Hispanic players were generally ignored by Major League Baseball teams before Jackie Robinson broke the color barrier in Major League Baseball.

== Historical roots ==
In 1899, the All Cubans became the first all-Hispanic team to travel to the United States and stage exhibition games, against established Negro league powerhouse teams. The All Cubans kept traveling to the United States each year until 1905. Beginning in 1907, they were replaced by the Cuban Stars, which became accepted as an independent Negro baseball team. In 1916, the team was struck by controversies and competition regarding booking, which led to the creation of a new Cuban Stars carrying the same name. To differentiate between the two teams, the newer of the two was referred to as the Cuban Stars (East), which was owned by Alex Pompez and competed in the New York city area. The older team (which was owned by Abel Linares and Tinti Molina and previously had competed in the New York area) moved to the midwestern region and became known as the Cuban Stars (West).

== Founding (or reincarnation) ==
Around 1930, both Cuban Stars teams folded, but in 1935 Pompez was able to re-create a Cuban team under the new name New York Cubans. In 1935 and 1936, the New York Cubans called historic Hinchliffe Stadium in Paterson, New Jersey home. They also played some home games in the Dyckman Oval in the Inwood neighborhood of Manhattan, and later played in the Polo Grounds (1939–1950) and in Yankee Stadium (1941–1946).

Unlike what the team's name may suggest, the team was not composed exclusively of Cuban players; there were players from other Hispanic nationalities and the United States as well. In 1941, Perucho Cepeda, father of National Baseball Hall of Famer Orlando Peruchin Cepeda and a legendary player around the Caribbean himself, became the first Puerto Rican to play for the New York Cubans. Apart from Cepeda, there were also players from Mexico and the Dominican Republic playing for the New York Cubans. From 1941 to 1944, the Cubans had the services of well-known Dominican utility player Tetelo Vargas.

Only one other team of the era, the Indianapolis Clowns, boasted a line-up with as many international players as the Cubans did.

== Negro League World Series champions ==
With a team that included such notables as Luis Tiant, Sr., and Minnie Miñoso the New York Cubans won their only Negro League World Series title in 1947, defeating the Cleveland Buckeyes.

== Demise ==
The Cubans did not win another championship, and, due to various reasons, including economic strain and an exodus of both African American and Hispanic players to the Major Leagues, the Negro Leagues stopped playing in 1950.

== Players ==
=== Hall of Famers ===
- Martín Dihigo holds the distinction of being inducted into three Halls of Fame; Cuban, Mexican and American.
- Minnie Miñoso holds the distinction of being inducted into three Halls of Fame: Cuban, Mexican and American.
- Tetelo Vargas is a member of the Puerto Rican and Cuban baseball Hall of Fames, despite never having played a single game in Cuba. His election to the Cuban baseball Hall of Fame has been credited to his participation with the New York Cubans.
- Alex Pompez

== MLB throwback jerseys ==
On May 29, 2010, the New York Mets wore Cubans uniforms in a game in Milwaukee against the Brewers, who wore Milwaukee Bears uniforms. The Mets then wore this uniform again on August 22 against the Pittsburgh Pirates.
