= New England Monthly =

- Editor: Daniel Okrent
- Frequency: Monthly
- Publisher: Robert Nylen
- Founded: 1984
- Final issue Number: September 1990 v. 7, no. 9
- Company: New England Monthly, Inc.
- Country: United States
- Based in: Haydenville Historic District, Williamsburg, Massachusetts
- ISSN: 8750-216X

New England Monthly was a magazine published in the Haydenville Historic District, of Williamsburg, Massachusetts, from 1984 to 1990.

== History and profile ==
Founded in 1984 by Robert Nylen (publisher) and Daniel Okrent (editor), it won the National Magazine Award for General Excellence in 1986 and 1987 and was a finalist for many other National Magazine Awards (in categories including reporting, personal service, and design) in its brief existence. Purchased in 1989 from its original investors by Telemedia, a Canadian publishing company, it ceased publication in September 1990 during the recession which hit the New England region.

Several New England Monthly staff members and contributors went on to achieve notable success after the magazine's demise. These include staff writer Jonathan Harr, author of A Civil Action (1995); executive editor Joe Nocera, who currently writes a weekly business column for The New York Times; Annie Proulx, the magazine's gardening columnist, who later won the Pulitzer Prize and the National Book Award for her fiction; architecture critic Michael Kimmelman, who became art critic for The New York Times; and contributor Adrian Nicole LeBlanc, author of the prize-winning Random Family (2003). Publisher Nylen became a publishing consultant; editor Okrent was a finalist for the Pulitzer Prize for History for his book Great Fortune: The Epic of Rockefeller Center (2003), and from 2003 to 2005 was the first public editor of The New York Times.

Writer and editor Richard Todd, who was associated with the magazine from its launch, succeeded Okrent as editor in late 1989 and assumed Nylen's role as publisher in the spring of 1990. The magazine suspended publication in September of that year.

In May 2014 an unrelated magazine named New England Monthly launched in print and online in Dartmouth, Massachusetts.
