= Alessandra Stanley =

American journalist (born 1955)

- Born: October 3, 1955 (age 71); Boston, Massachusetts, U.S.
- Education: Harvard University
- Occupation: Journalist
- Spouse: Michael Specter (former)
- Children: 1
- Writing career
- Language: English
- Genre: Journalism
- Notable awards: Matrix Award (1993); Weintal Prize (1998)

Alessandra Stanley (born October 3, 1955) is an American journalist and former New York Times writer and critic. She is currently the co-editor of a weekly newsletter "for worldly cosmopolitans" that launched in 2019 called Air Mail, alongside former Vanity Fair editor-in-chief Graydon Carter. Her most recent Air Mail columns focus on Trump and the 2024 election.

Notable Air Mail stories include a ten-part series on the 2022 University of Idaho murders, and an investigation in the real-life predations of the founder of School of Rock.

== Biography ==
She was born in Boston, Massachusetts, and grew up in Washington, D.C., and Europe. She is the daughter of NATO defense advisor Timothy W. Stanley. She studied literature at Harvard University and then became a correspondent for Time, working overseas as well as in Los Angeles and in Washington, D.C., where she covered the White House. Stanley then moved to The New York Times as a foreign correspondent, first as co-chief of the Moscow bureau, and then Rome bureau chief. In 2003 she became the chief television critic for The New York Times. She has also written for The New York Times Magazine, The New Republic, GQ and Vogue.

In 1993, Alessandra Stanley received The Matrix Award from Women in Communications, and in 1998, she received the Weintal Prize for Diplomatic Reporting.

Among Stanley's notable columns are her critical take on the series finale of The Sopranos, her assessment of Jerry Sandusky's denial of charges of pedophilia to NBC and her coverage of Russian television on the eve of the 2012 Russian presidential election.

In the fall of 2011, Stanley taught a class at Princeton University called "Investigative Viewing: The Art of Television Criticism", described as an "intensive introduction to criticism as it is undertaken at the highest level of a cultural institution".

Several news and media organizations, including the Times, have criticized the accuracy in some of her stories. Among the articles that they have criticized are a September 5, 2005, piece on Hurricane Katrina, a 2005 article that mistakenly called the sitcom Everybody Loves Raymond "All About Raymond", and a July 18, 2009, retrospective on the career of Walter Cronkite that contained errors. In an August 2009 article examining the mistakes in the Cronkite piece, Clark Hoyt, the Times's public editor, described Stanley as "much admired by editors for the intellectual heft of her coverage of television" but "with a history of errors". Then executive editor Bill Keller defended Stanley, saying "She is — in my opinion, among others — a brilliant critic".

Stanley wrote an article for The New York Times in September 2014 entitled "Wrought in Rhimes's Image: Viola Davis Plays Shonda Rhimes's Latest Tough Heroine" about television series How to Get Away with Murder and the career of its African-American producer, Shonda Rhimes. Stanley wrote, "When Shonda Rhimes writes her autobiography, it should be called 'How to Get Away With Being an Angry Black Woman'", an expression that was seen by some as offensive. Stanley's piece, wrote the Times's Public Editor, Margaret Sullivan, "struck many readers as completely off-base. Many called it offensive, while some went further, saying it was racist". Stanley defended her piece, writing in an email message to Talking Points Memo, "[t]he whole point of the piece—once you read past the first 140 characters—is to praise Shonda Rhimes for pushing back so successfully on a tiresome but insidious stereotype".

Stanley left the Times in 2017, and began working on Air Mail with Graydon Carter in 2018.

In 2023, Stanley co-authored a letter from the editor for Air Mail Weekly explaining their decision to let accused rapist Armie Hammer tell his side of the story in response to charges filed against him in 2022. In the letter, Stanley cites their decision as wanting to “know why so few of the accusations against Hammer were examined seriously by the media or law enforcement.”

== Personal life ==
Stanley was previously married to Michael Specter. They have a daughter.
