= Byron Calame =

American journalist (born 1939)

- Born: April 14, 1939 (age 86); Appleton City, Missouri, US
- Occupation: Journalist

Byron "Barney" Calame (born April 14, 1939, in Appleton City, Missouri) is an American journalist. He worked at The Wall Street Journal for 39 years, retiring as deputy managing editor in 2004. In 2005, he became the second public editor of The New York Times for a fixed two-year term.

== Early life and education ==
Calame earned a bachelor's degree in journalism at the University of Missouri in 1961 and was awarded a Doctor of Humane Letters honorary degree in 2011. He received a master's degree in political science at the University of Maryland in 1966. He served as an officer in the U.S. Navy from 1961 to 1965.

== Wall Street Journal ==
Calame joined the Journal in 1965 and served as a reporter, bureau chief and editor before being named the deputy managing editor in 1992. "As deputy managing editor since 1992, Barney has run the entire paper in my absence and much of it in my presence", Paul Steiger, then the Journal managing editor, said in announcing Calame's retirement at the end of 2004. His responsibilities as deputy managing editor included maintaining the paper's ethical and journalistic standards, and he was "widely regarded as the conscience of the paper". His role outside the Journal newsroom, however, was seldom a highly visible one.

His work at the Journal was recognized by several awards. He received the 2005 Gerald Loeb Lifetime Achievement Award, the 2005 New York Financial Writers’ Association Elliott V. Bell Award, and the 2002 Society of American Business Editors and Writers Distinguished Achievement Award.

== New York Times ==
Invited to become the Times public editor two months after retiring from the Journal, Calame succeeded Daniel Okrent in the ombudsman-like position and was followed by Clark Hoyt. His focus on the nuts-and-bolts of newspapering and journalistic ethics drew sharp criticism, and some observers complained that he pulled his punches and was too restrained in criticizing the newspaper and its staff.

Jack Shafer, then the media critic for Slate, declared in a May 2006 commentary that Calame's first year as public editor had been "dreadful". He complained "Calame possesses a mandate that would allow him to boil the journalistic ocean if he so desired, but he usually elects to merely warm a teapot for his readers and pour out thimblefuls of weak chamomile".

Calame was criticized by both conservatives and liberals. Conservative syndicated columnist Michelle Malkin called Calame "totally worthless". Sidney Schanberg, then the media writer for the liberal Village Voice, accused him in 2006 of nitpicking a Times national security article.

Some assessments were more positive. Calame was awarded the 2006 Bart Richards Award for Media Criticism for six of his public editor columns. "’He was forthright in his examination and was not afraid to say exactly what he thought and to hold the newspaper accountable,’ said Peter Bhatia, a former American Society of News Editors president who was one of the three judges.

As Calame neared the end of his term, Shafer told the New York Observer: "I think that Barney has gotten better. He’s not engaging in the ankle-biting behavior he was before. I would give him a B for reversing direction, and getting away from attacking the capillaries".

Calame severely criticized Judith Miller after the conclusion of the legal maneuvering over her controversial decision to go to jail in 2005 rather than reveal her sources of information. He challenged "shortcuts" she had taken in her reporting and concluded "the problems facing her inside and outside the newsroom will make it difficult for her to return to the paper as a reporter". His views were hotly contested by Miller and her supporters, who contended that Calame was acting more like a management representative than an independent thinker.

He revealed that an April 9, 2006, The New York Times Magazine cover story by Jack Hitt had asserted—without checking the trial record—that a woman in El Salvador had been sentenced to 30 years in prison for having an abortion; in fact, she had been convicted of murdering a newborn baby. Calame criticized two assistant managing editors who refused to retract letters to readers insisting the story was accurate—after being told of the true verdict—and refused run a correction in the paper until the outcry that developed after his column appeared.

A January 1, 2006 column accused Times executive editor, Bill Keller, and publisher, Arthur Sulzberger, Jr., of "stonewalling" for refusing to answer Calame's questions about how long Keller had held up publication of a December 16, 2005, story about National Security Agency classified wiretapping programs. Eight months later, Keller acknowledged to Calame that the story had been held up before the 2004 presidential election and longer than the one year stated in the original article.

Media offices
Preceded by Daniel Okrent	Public Editor for The New York Times; 2005–2007	Succeeded by Clark Hoyt
