= Clark Hoyt =

American journalist

Clark Hoyt is an American journalist who was the public editor of The New York Times, serving as the "readers' representative." He was the newspaper's third public editor, or ombudsman, after Daniel Okrent and Byron Calame. His initial two-year term began on May 14, 2007, and was later extended for another year, expiring in June 2010.

== Biography ==
Hoyt is a member of The Hill School class of 1960 and a 1964 graduate of Columbia College of Columbia University. Hoyt began his journalism career in 1966 at The Ledger. Shortly afterwards in 1968 he joined the American media company Knight Ridder, where he was deployed to work at the Detroit Free Press as a general reporter, before progressing to become a political reporter. Indeed, Hoyt would spend most of his journalism career at Knight Ridder—except for a stint at The Miami Herald as a Washington Correspondent during the 1970s — until its sale to The McClatchy Company in 2006.

During the 1980s and mid-2000s, upon Hoyt's return to Knight Ridder, he filled numerous positions within the company, including business editor, managing editor, Washington news editor, and chief of the Washington bureau. Hoyt also served as Vice President of News for Knight Ridder from 1993–99.

Hoyt is also a joint 1973 Pulitzer Prize winner; a prize he shares with fellow journalist Robert Boyd for their coverage of the Democratic vice presidential nominee Thomas Eagleton, and their uncovering of the electric shock treatment and powerful anti-psychotics used to treat Eagleton's ongoing mental health problems regarding his manic depression, which Eagleton tried to keep secret from the Democratic presidential nominee George McGovern and the press.

== Departure from The New York Times ==
On June 12, 2010, in his final analysis of his three-year tenure as The New York Times' public editor, Hoyt said,

For the past three years, my assignment has been to try to help this newspaper live up to its own high journalistic standards as it covered a historic presidential election, two wars, the Great Recession, violence in the Middle East and more. I have deplored the overuse of anonymous sources, warned against the creep of opinion into news analysis and worried about the preservation of Times quality on the Internet. But, in truth, I have sometimes felt less like a keeper of the flame and more like an internal affairs cop.

Further, upon commenting about the New York Times' continual accusations of liberal bias, Hoyt said,

There is no question that the editorial page is liberal and the regular columnists on the Op-Ed page are heavily weighted in that direction. There is also no question that The Times, though a national newspaper, shares the prevailing sensibilities of the city and region where it is published. It does not take creationism or intelligent design as serious alternatives to the theory of evolution. It prints the marriages and commitment ceremonies of same-sex couples. It covers art and cultural events out on the edge....But if The Times were really the Fox News of the left, how could you explain the investigative reporting that brought down Eliot Spitzer, New York’s Democratic governor; derailed the election campaign of his Democratic successor, David Paterson; got Charles Rangel, the Harlem Democrat who was chairman of the House Ways and Means Committee, in ethics trouble; and exposed the falsehoods that Attorney General Richard Blumenthal of Connecticut, another Democrat, was telling about his service record in the Vietnam era?

Media offices
Preceded by Byron Calame	Public Editor for The New York Times; 2007–2010	Succeeded by Arthur S. Brisbane
