= Elizabeth Spayd =

American media journalist

- Education: Colorado State University
- Occupation: Media journalist
- Employers: The Washington Post; Columbia Journalism Review; The New York Times; Facebook

Elizabeth Spayd is an American media journalist. She was the first woman to be named managing editor at The Washington Post, the editor and publisher of the Columbia Journalism Review, the sixth public editor of The New York Times, and a transparency consultant for Facebook. During her tenure at The New York Times, she took a number of controversial stances, and the paper eliminated her role in 2017.

Media offices
Preceded by Margaret Sullivan	Public Editor for The New York Times; 2016–2017	Position eliminated
