= Last Call: The Rise and Fall of Prohibition =

2010 nonfiction book by Daniel Okrent

Last Call: The Rise and Fall of Prohibition is a 2010 nonfiction book by American writer Daniel Okrent about the history of prohibition in the United States. The book was published by Scribner. It was a primary influence on the Ken Burns documentary Prohibition.
