= George Walker (1930s pitcher) =

American baseball player (1915–1967)

- Pitcher
- Born: February 5, 1915; Waco, Texas, U.S.
- Died: August 19, 1967 (aged 52); Waco, Texas, U.S.
- Batted: Right Threw: Right

Negro league baseball debut
- 1937, for the Homestead Grays

Last appearance
- 1943, for the Kansas City Monarchs

Teams
- Homestead Grays (1937–1938); Kansas City Monarchs (1939–1941, 1943)

Career highlights and awards
- Negro American League ERA leader (1940); Negro American League wins leader (1939)

George T. Walker (February 5, 1915 – August 19, 1967) was an American Negro league pitcher in the 1930s and 1940s.

Walker holds the lowest known single-season WHIP across all major professional baseball leagues, with 0.7347 during his 1940 season with the Kansas City Monarchs.

A native of Waco, Texas, Walker made his Negro leagues debut with the Homestead Grays in 1937. He went on to play for the Kansas City Monarchs through 1943, then played minor league baseball for the Tucson Cowboys in 1952 and the Tyler East Texans in 1953. Walker died in Waco in 1967 at age 52.
