= Columbia Journalism Review =

American magazine for professional journalists

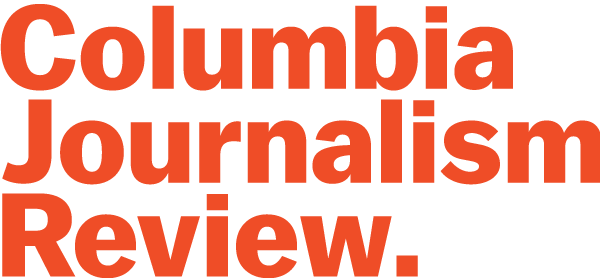
- Editor: Betsy Morais
- Categories: Journalism, journalism reviews
- Frequency: Biannually
- Format: A4
- First issue: 1961; 65 years ago
- Company: Columbia University Graduate School of Journalism
- Country: United States
- Based in: New York City
- Language: English
- Website: www.cjr.org
- ISSN: 0010-194X (print); 2691-6479 (web)
- OCLC: 464657921

The Columbia Journalism Review (CJR) is a biannual magazine for professional journalists that has been published by the Columbia University Graduate School of Journalism since 1961. Its original purpose was "to assess the performance of journalism in all its forms, to call attention to its shortcomings and strengths, and to help define—or redefine—standards of honest, responsible service." The CJR's contents include news and media industry trends, analysis, professional ethics, and stories behind news. In 2015, the CJR announced that the publishing frequency of the print magazine was being reduced from six to two issues per year in order to focus on its digital operations.

== Organization board ==
The CJR's current chairman is Rebecca Blumenstein, President-Editorial of NBC News. The publisher is Jelani Cobb, dean of the Columbia Journalism School and staff writer at The New Yorker. The previous chairman of the magazine was Victor Navasky, a professor at the Columbia University Graduate School of Journalism and former editor and publisher of the politically progressive The Nation. According to Executive Editor Michael Hoyt, Navasky's role is "99% financial" and "he doesn't push anything editorially." Hoyt also has stated that Navasky has "learned how to get a small magazine of ideas into the black, and he's trying to come up with some strategies for us."

== Finances ==
CJR is a nonprofit entity and relies on fundraising to fund its operations. In August 2007, Mike Hoyt, the executive editor of CJR since 2003, said the magazine's income in 2007 would exceed expenses by about $50,000, with estimates of a $40,000 surplus in 2008. Hoyt attributed the surpluses to a mix of some staff cuts, such as not replacing three editors who left, and fundraising increases. Donations to the CJR in the past three years have included about $1.25 million from a group of news veterans headed by former Philadelphia Inquirer executive editor Gene Roberts.

As of mid-2007, the CJR had an eight-person staff, an annual budget of $2.3 million, and a paper circulation of approximately 19,000, including 6,000 student subscriptions. Although enrollment numbers are not available and do not contribute to these circulation figures, subscriptions to an Internet newsletter entitled The Media Today began in July 2017.

== Editor ==
In 2016, Kyle Pope, who had served as the editor in chief of The New York Observer, was announced as the new editor and publisher of CJR, replacing Elizabeth Spayd, when she was announced as the sixth public editor of The New York Times. In 2017, in Washington, D.C., Pope addressed the House Judiciary Committee bipartisan Forum on Press Freedoms regarding concerns that the actions of Donald Trump during his campaign for and following election as President of the United States undermine the constitutional freedom of the press. In June 2024, Sewell Chan was appointed to be the executive editor of CJR, effective September 16. In April 2025, Columbia University fired Chan eight months after his tenure began. In November 2025, longtime managing editor Betsy Morais was appointed editor in chief.

== See also ==
- American Journalism Review
- New Yorkers in journalism
