= LearnedLeague =

Web-based quiz competition

- LearnedLeague Logo
- Creator: Shayne Bushfield
- Website: LearnedLeague.com
- Registration: Required to participate
- Launched: 1997
- Current status: Active

LearnedLeague is a web-based, invitation-only global quiz league operated by Seattle-based software engineer Shayne Bushfield under the pseudonym "Thorsten A. Integrity". As of March 2026, it has over 35,800 members worldwide.

== Structure ==
Players are organized into leagues with nonspecific geographic designations like "Central" and "Frontier". Players in each league are then sorted into "rundles" based on past performance (all first-time players begin in special rookie rundles). A promotion-and-relegation system is used: a player can move up to higher rundles by finishing at or near the top of a lower one, or move down to lower rundles by finishing at or near the bottom of an upper one. The top players in each league compete annually for the title of LearnedLeague Champion.

== Gameplay ==
=== Regular season ===
Each calendar year is divided into four seasons. Each season includes 25 match days—essentially one per U.S. business day. Players are paired against each other each day during the season and compete in a six-question trivia match, with questions from 18 categories ranging from world history, science, and geography to lifestyle, food/drink, and television. Each player attempts to answer as many questions correctly as possible ("offense") and assigns point values to each question ("defense"). Players must assign one question a value of 3 points, two questions values of 2 points, two questions values of 1 point, and one question a value of 0 points (allowing a maximum score per player of 9 points). A player's opponent will get the assigned point value if they answer correctly. Since the past performance of all players based on subject matter is openly available, defense is an important factor in gameplay. Answers must be submitted by 10 PM Pacific Time. Results from the previous day along with the new set of questions are released each Match Day by midnight Pacific time.

=== MiniLeagues and One-Day Specials ===
Between regular seasons, a number of optional multiday and single-day competitions are held, each with a specific theme. Competitions have been on topics as varied as Boston, The Middle Ages, Steely Dan, and Wikipedia. In single-day competitions (individually known as a "One-Day Special"), all competitors answer 12 questions. All correct answers are worth 15 points, but five player-designated "money questions" award additional points equal to the percentage of all players who got the question wrong. So, for example, if a player correctly answers a money question that 30% of all other players get right, they earn 70 points on top of the base 15, for a total of 85. Some One-Day Specials follow a constraint where each question is accompanied by an image or audio, known as Just Images or Just Audio one-days, respectively. Other One-Day Specials have a hidden connection that is not announced beforehand, known as a Mystery Theme.

Multiday competitions, called "MiniLeagues", are run in a similar manner to regular LearnedLeague seasons, but in lieu of rundles, players are assigned to ad hoc groups of 12. After 11 rounds of regular play are completed, the top three finishers (formerly, top two finishers) in each group compete in a championship structured identically to the single-day competitions (non-finalists can play as well, but their scores are not recorded on the final list).

=== LearnedLeague Championship ===
The LearnedLeague Championship is an annual competition between the top competitors of each league. Past champions and the top 50 of the previous year are automatically invited; otherwise, in each of the four seasons within a year, the highest-finishing player in an A Rundle not already qualified gets a spot. The format is similar to the one-day format, with 12-question sets of which five must be moneyed. There are four such sets, and after the first two only those who score in the top half continue to the last two. The winner is the person who scores the most total points, and earns a scarf.

Unlike regular LearnedLeague gameplay, the championship sets are proctored on a web communication platform such as Google Meet, and have a shorter timeframe to answer and money the questions.

LL Champions
Year	Champion	Runner-Up	3rd Place
2026	GroceV	FrielP	MeyerT
2025	JacksonM	ShimizuK	KingJA
2024	MeyerT	GroceV	WhitlockS
2023	FrielP	GoodeM	SobczakR
2022	FrielP	MeyersR	SngD
2021	UllspergerA	MeyerT	MeyersR
2020	MeyerT	BrooksS	MeyersR
2019	MeyerT	GroceV	BahnamanS
2018	PerryS	SterlacciJ	BlishS
2017	BlishS	RautY	UllspergerA
2016	MeyerT	BahnamanS	PerryS
2015	BlishS	DhuwaliaR	PerryS
2014	MeyerT	FrielP	

== Rules of conduct ==
LearnedLeague players are prohibited by an honor code from looking up answers. In addition, forfeiting matches is discouraged (if players are aware of a scheduling conflict, they can request Advance Access, allowing them to receive that day's questions in advance). Both cheating and repeated forfeiting are grounds for expulsion from LearnedLeague.

== Players ==
New players can join LearnedLeague only if they are referred by current members in good standing. Prominent current and former players include Jeopardy! champion and host Ken Jennings, Jeopardy! champions Jamie Ding and Brad Rutter, Game of Thrones showrunner David Benioff, musician Jackie Fox, actor Guy Branum, Rotisserie League Baseball inventor Daniel Okrent, writer Anna Quindlen, politician and former White House Chief of Staff Mick Mulvaney, economist Steven Levitt, and journalists Dylan Matthews and David Weigel.

== History ==
Bushfield started the league in his 20-person workplace in 1997. In 1999, he learned HTML to build the LearnedLeague website.

In 2004, the league had 100 players. As of 2020, there were 18,000.
