= Walks plus hits per inning pitched =

Baseball statistic measuring the baserunners a pitcher has allowed

In baseball statistics, walks plus hits per inning pitched (WHIP) is a sabermetric measurement of the number of baserunners a pitcher has allowed per inning pitched. WHIP is calculated by adding the number of walks and hits allowed and dividing this sum by the number of innings pitched.

WHIP reflects a pitcher's propensity for allowing batters to reach base, therefore a lower WHIP indicates better performance.

While earned run average (ERA) measures the earned runs a pitcher gives up, WHIP more directly measures a pitcher's effectiveness against batters. Like ERA, WHIP accounts for pitcher performance disregarding errors and unearned runs. (Note: On-base plus slugging, or OPS, is a somewhat similar measure for hitters in that it's attempting to be a measure of overall effectiveness.)

== History ==
The stat was invented in 1979 by writer Daniel Okrent, who called the metric "innings pitched ratio" at the time. Okrent excluded hit batsmen from the numerator of baserunners allowed since Sunday newspapers did not include hit batsmen in their agate box scores.

WHIP is one of the few sabermetric statistics to enter mainstream baseball usage. In addition to its use in live games, the WHIP is one of the most commonly used statistics in fantasy baseball, and is standard in fantasy leagues that employ 4×4, 5×5, and 6×6 formats.

== Leaders ==
WHIP near 1.000 or lower over the course of a season will often rank among the league leaders in Major League Baseball (MLB).

The lowest single-season WHIP in MLB history through 2024 is held by George Walker of the 1940 Kansas City Monarchs, with a WHIP of 0.7347 which broke the previous record of 0.7692 of Guy Hecker of the 1882 Louisville Eclipse. The second-lowest single-season WHIP is held by Pedro Martínez of the 2000 Boston Red Sox with a WHIP of 0.7373; third-lowest single-season WHIP is held by Kenta Maeda of the 2020 Minnesota Twins, with a WHIP of 0.7500; the fourth-lowest single-season WHIP is held by the previously mentioned Guy Hecker; the fifth-lowest single-season WHIP is held by Walter Johnson of the 1913 Washington Senators, with a WHIP of 0.7803.

Cleveland Broncos/Naps (currently the Guardians) right-handed pitcher Addie Joss holds the MLB record for the lowest career WHIP as of 2024, with a 0.9678 WHIP in 2,327 innings. Active pitcher Jacob deGrom of the Texas Rangers currently holds a career 0.9941 WHIP in 1367 innings and holds second. Chicago White Sox spitballer Ed Walsh is third, with a 0.9996 WHIP in 2,964 1/3 innings, the lowest career WHIP for a qualified pitcher with 10 or more seasons pitched. Reliever Mariano Rivera ranks fourth among qualified pitchers with a career WHIP of 1.0003 in 1,283 2/3 innings. Los Angeles Dodgers left-handed pitcher Clayton Kershaw ranks fifth with a WHIP of 1.0096 in 2,742 2/3 innings.

== See also ==
- List of Major League Baseball career WHIP leaders
