= List of Major League Baseball annual ERA leaders =

In baseball, earned run average (ERA) is a statistic used to measure the performance of pitchers. It is determined by dividing the number of earned runs allowed by the number of innings pitched, and multiplying by nine.^{[a]}

Major League Baseball recognizes the player in each league^{[b]} with the lowest earned run average each season.^{[c]} The first ERA champion in the National League was George Bradley; in the National League's inaugural 1876 season, Bradley posted a 1.23 ERA for the St. Louis Brown Stockings, allowing 78 earned runs in 573 innings pitched. The American League was established in 1901, and Hall of Fame pitcher Cy Young led that league with a 1.62 ERA for the Boston Americans during the 1901 season.

Over the course of his 17-year major league career, Lefty Grove led the American League in ERA nine times, with a career single-season low of 2.06 for the 1931 Philadelphia Athletics. Roger Clemens has won the second-most ERA titles, capturing six in the American League and one in the National League. Sandy Koufax led the National League in ERA for five consecutive seasons (1962–1966); Koufax' five awards are the most won consecutively by any player and are tied for the most awards by a player in the National League with Christy Mathewson and Clayton Kershaw. In the American League, Walter Johnson also won five ERA titles, and Pedro Martínez has won a total of five (four American League and one National League) with two different teams.

The most recent ERA champions are Cam Schlittler in the American League and Jacob Misiorowski in the National League.

The lowest single-season ERA in league history was posted by Tim Keefe, whose 0.86 ERA in 105 innings pitched for the National League's Troy Trojans in 1880 led his closest competitor by .52 runs. In the American League, Dutch Leonard's 0.96 ERA is a single-season record. Keefe and Leonard are the only two pitchers ever to allow less than one run per nine innings pitched in a single season. The widest margin of victory for an ERA champion is 1.96 runs, achieved when Martínez's 1.74 ERA led Clemens' 3.70 in the American League during the 2000 season. The largest margin of victory in the National League is 1.26 runs—Dazzy Vance's 2.61 ERA over Carl Hubbell's 3.87 in 1930. The smallest margin of victory for an ERA champion is .009 runs. Although the statistic is traditionally recorded to two decimal places by most sources, the 1988 American League title was decided by a margin of less than one hundredth of a run when Allan Anderson's ERA of 2.446 (55 earned runs in 202 1/3 innings) bested Teddy Higuera's 2.455 mark (62 earned runs in 227 1/3 innings). Other contests decided by one hundredth or less include Luis Tiant's 1.91 ERA ahead of Gaylord Perry's 1.92 in 1972 and Mark Fidrych (2.34) over Vida Blue (2.35) in 1976.

Hoyt Wilhelm was the first pitcher in the modern era to lead both leagues in ERA (1952 with the New York Giants and 1959 with the Baltimore Orioles).

== Key ==
Year	Links to the corresponding "year in baseball" or "Major League Baseball season" article
Leader	Player with the lowest earned run average (ERA) in the league
Runner-up	Player with the second-best ERA in the league
League	Denoted only for players outside of the modern major leagues
†	Member of the National Baseball Hall of Fame and Museum

== National League ==
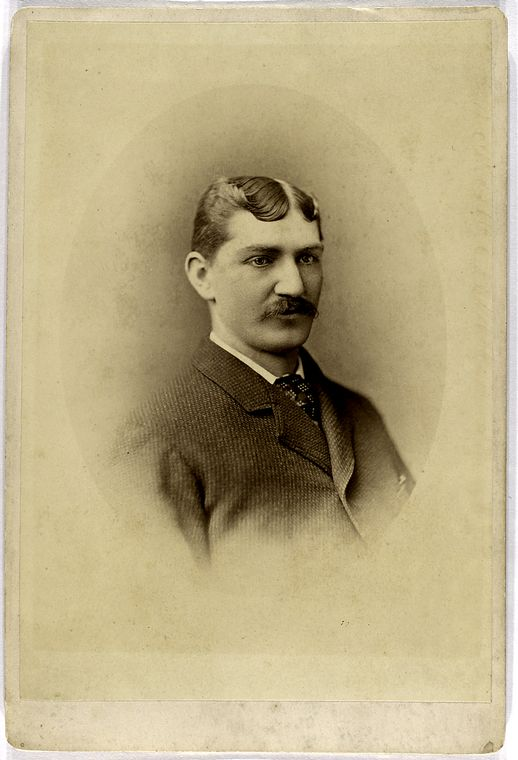
Tommy Bond won the triple crown in 1877, leading the National League in wins, strikeouts, and ERA.

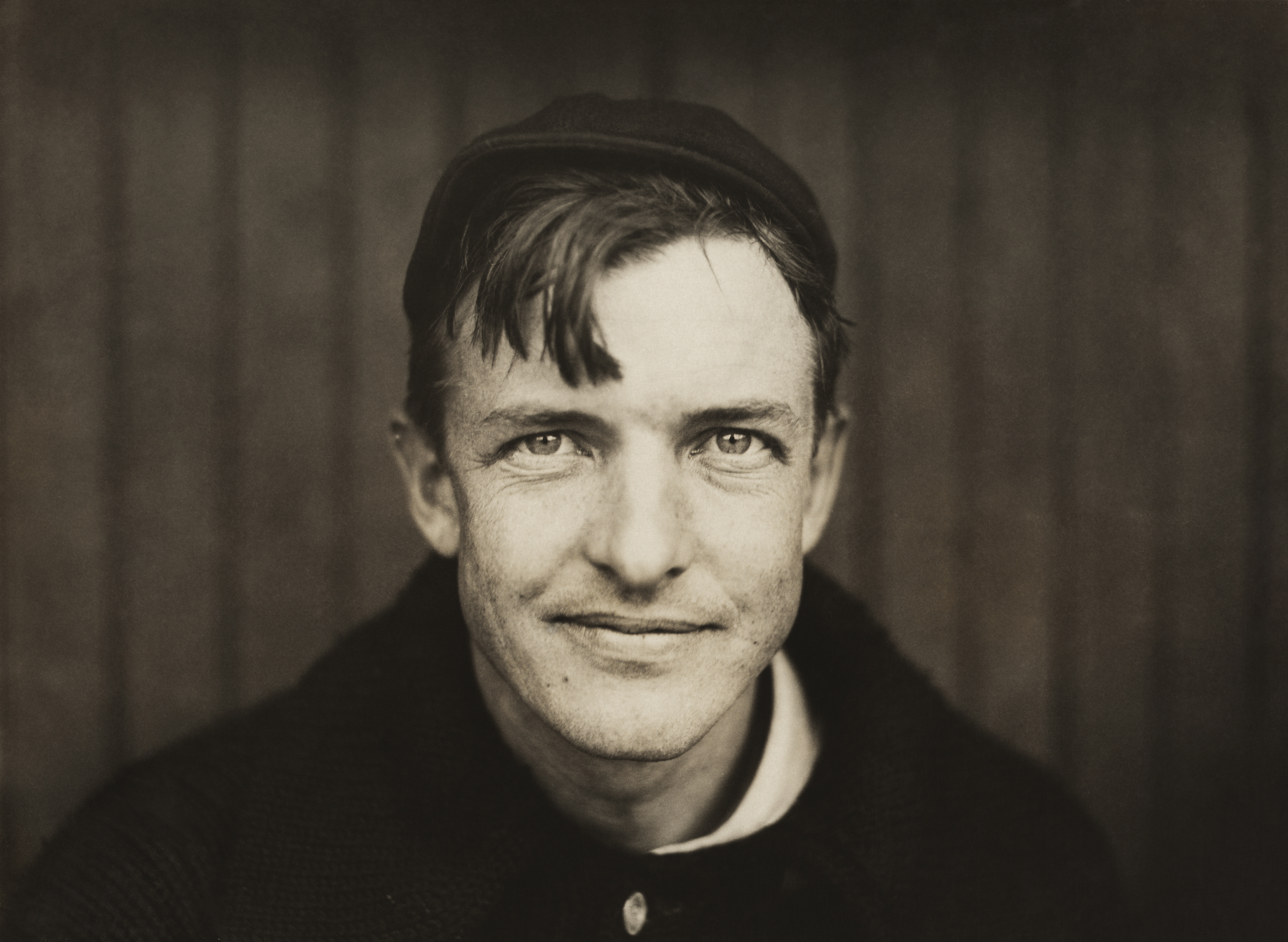
Christy Mathewson's career ERA of 2.13 is eighth on the all-time list; he led the National League in ERA five times during his career.

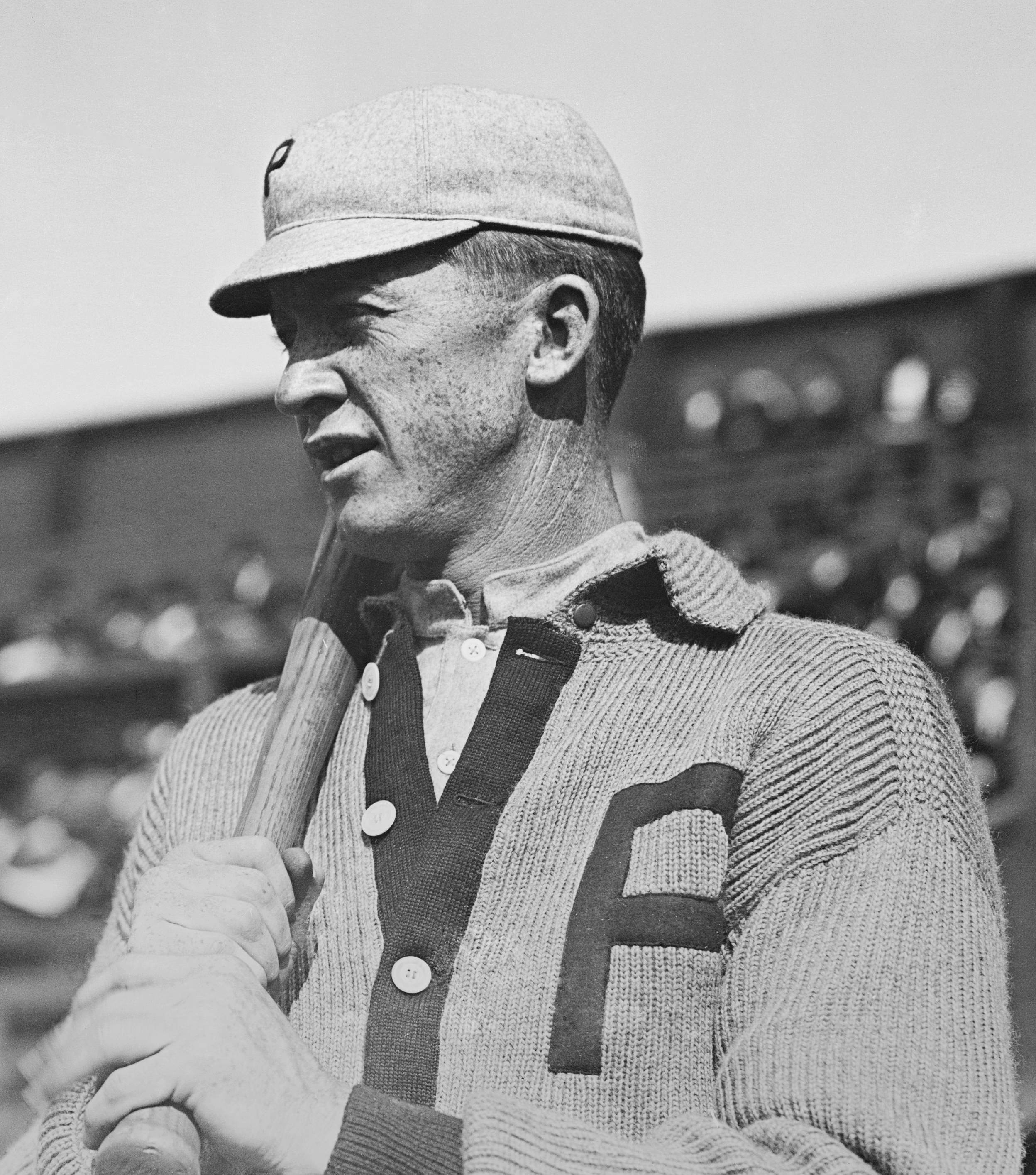
Grover Cleveland Alexander won the National League ERA title four times with two different teams (the Philadelphia Phillies and the Chicago Cubs).

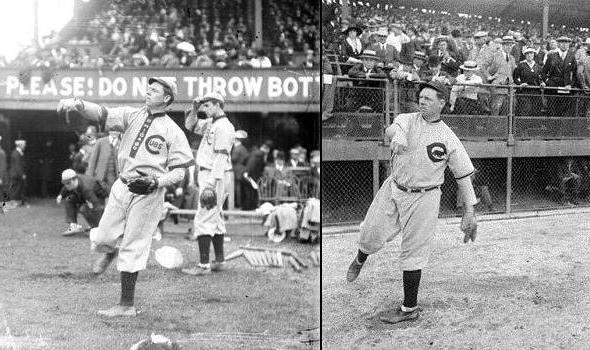
Mordecai "Three-Finger" Brown led the league in ERA in 1906 and finished second three times.

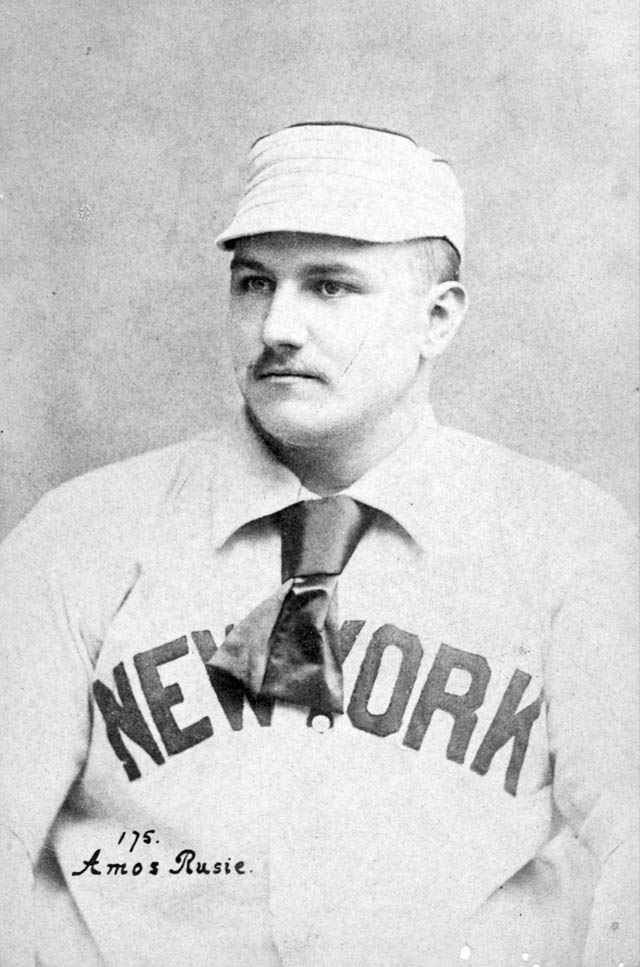
Amos Rusie led the National League in ERA in 1894 and 1897, and finished second to Ted Breitenstein in 1893.

Sandy Koufax' five consecutive seasons leading the National League in ERA is an NL record.

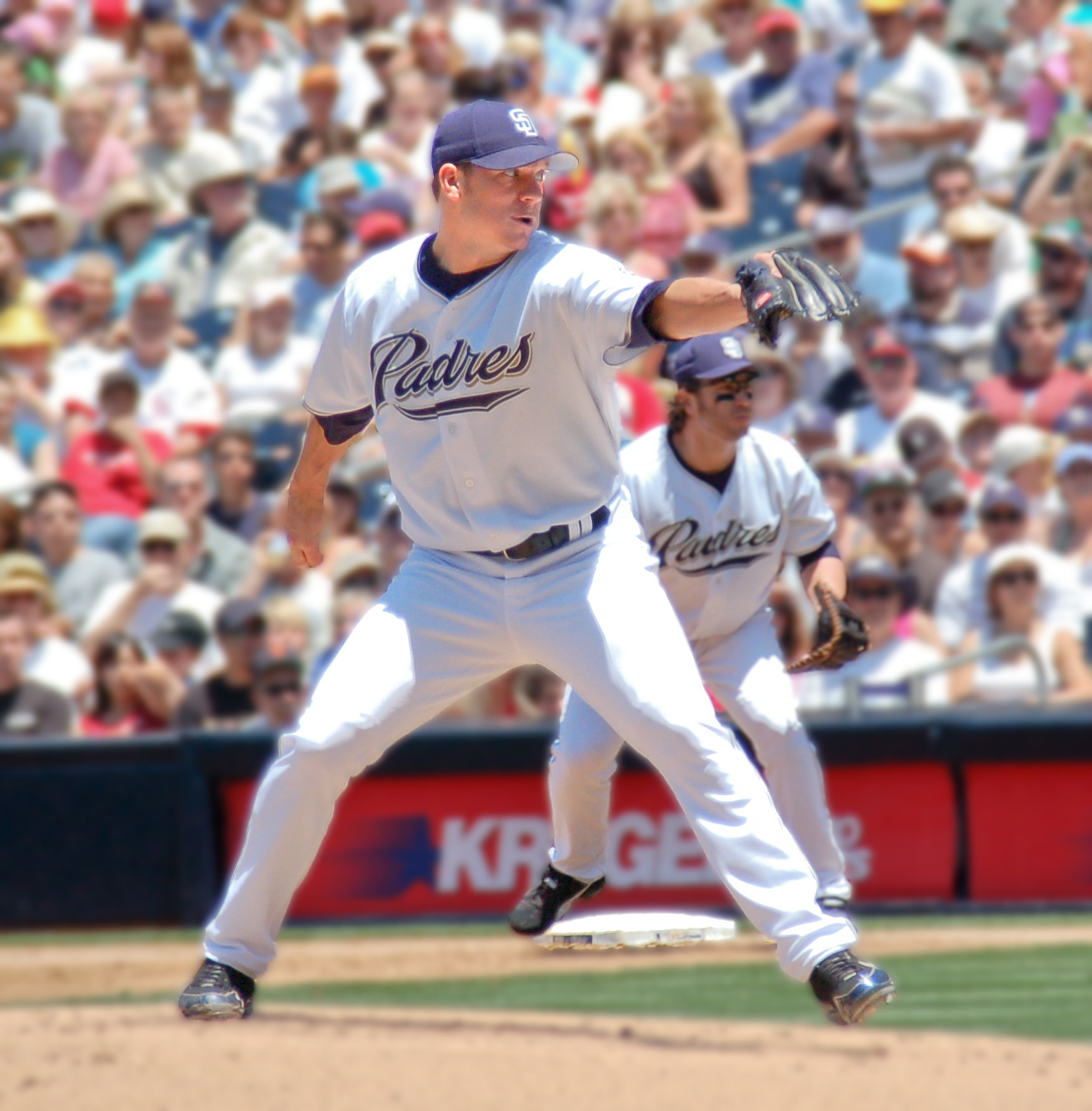
Jake Peavy's 2007 ERA of 2.54 led all National League pitchers.

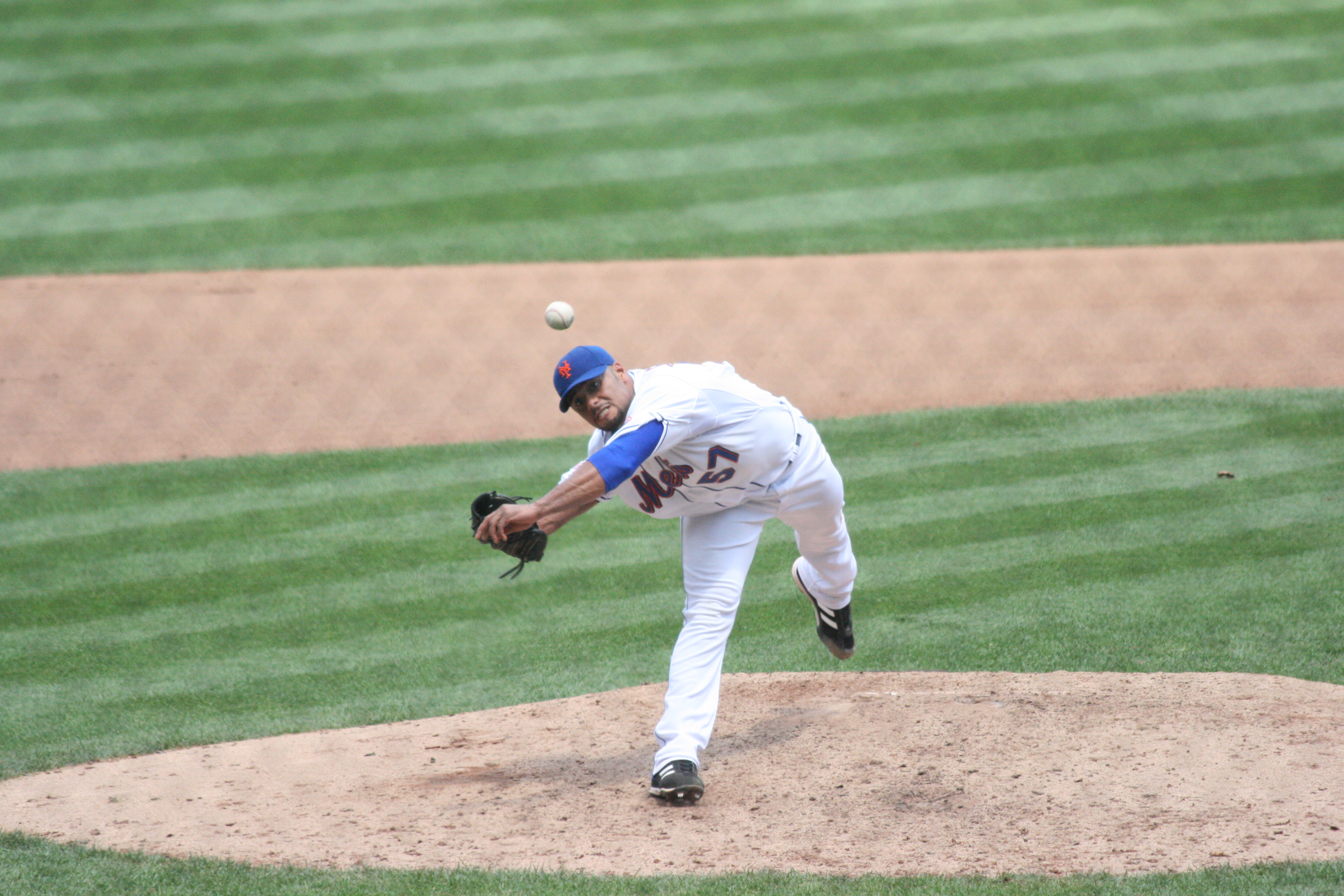
Johan Santana won the ERA title in his first National League season after eight years with the Minnesota Twins.

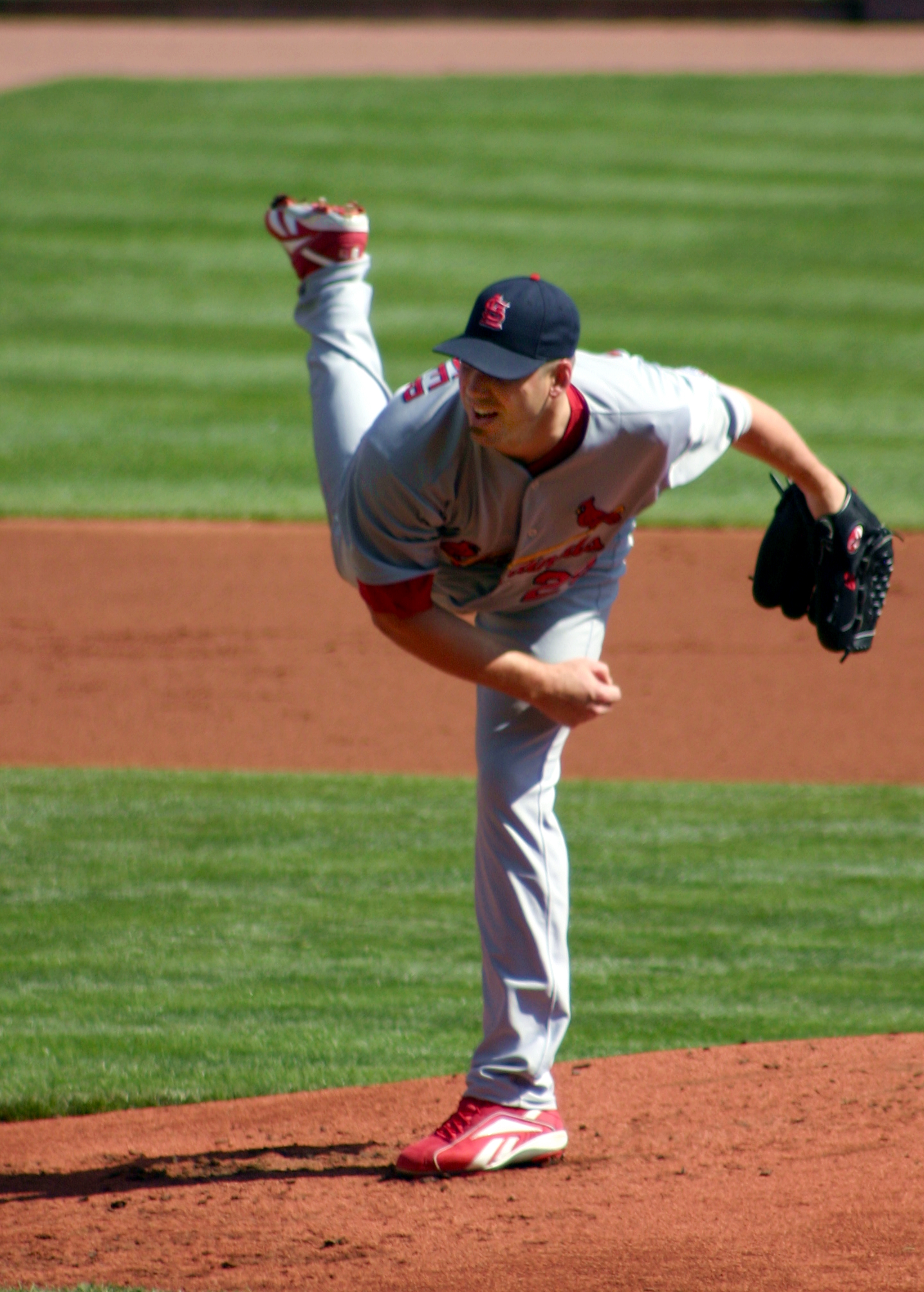
Chris Carpenter had the lowest ERA in the National League in 2009.

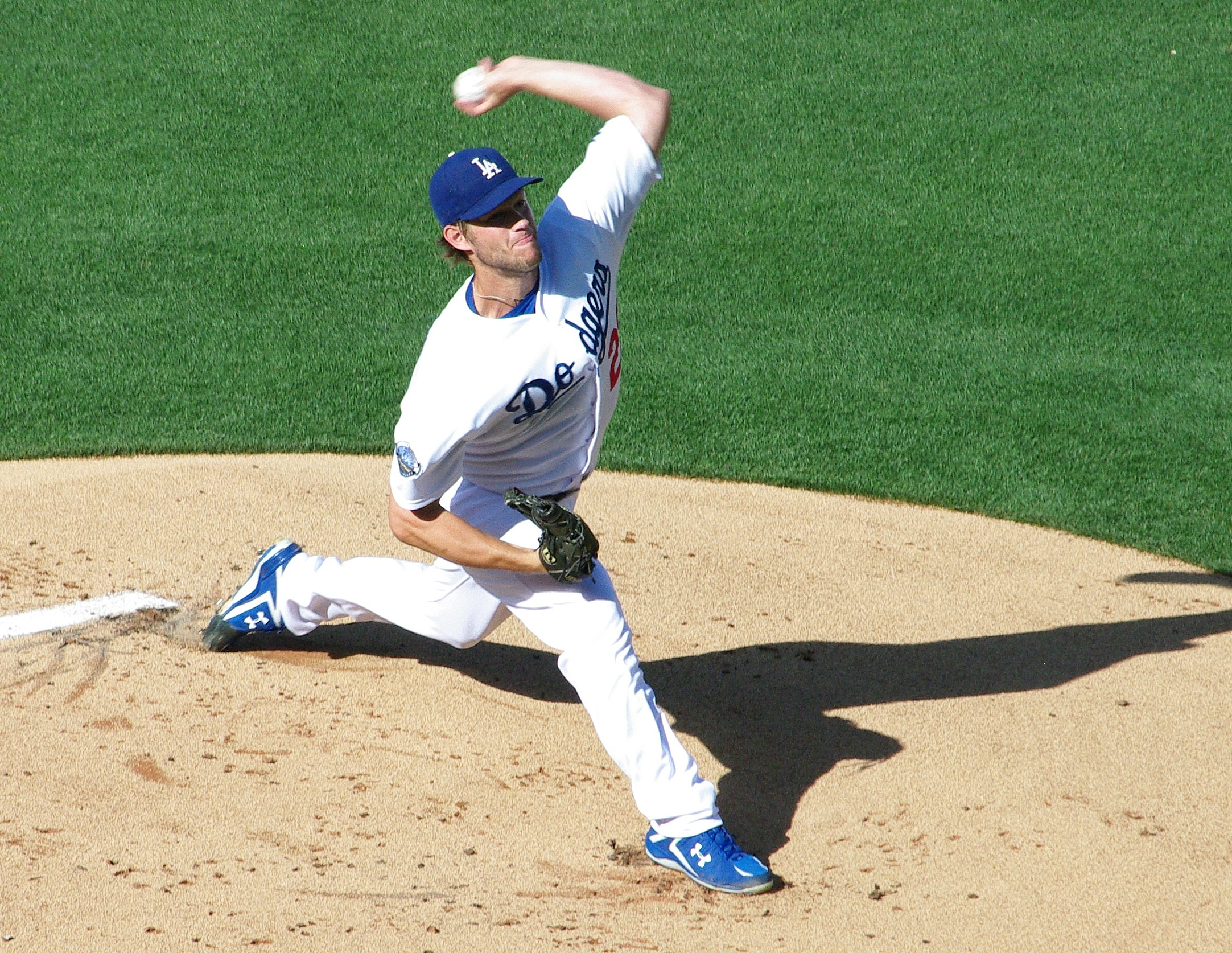
Clayton Kershaw is the first pitcher in history to lead MLB in ERA for 4 consecutive years (2011–2014).

Year	Leader	ERA	Team	Runner-up	ERA	Ref
1876	George Bradley	1.23	St. Louis Brown Stockings	Jim Devlin	1.56	
1877	Tommy Bond	2.11	Boston Red Caps	Terry Larkin	2.14	
1878	John Montgomery Ward^{†}	1.51	Providence Grays	Jim McCormick	1.69	
1879	Tommy Bond	1.96	Boston Red Caps	Will White	1.99	
1880	Tim Keefe^{†}	0.86	Troy Trojans	George Bradley	1.38	
1881	Stump Weidman	1.80	Detroit Wolverines	John Montgomery Ward^{†}	2.13	
1882	Larry Corcoran	1.95	Chicago White Stockings	Charles Radbourn^{†}	2.09	
1883	Jim McCormick	1.84	Cleveland Blues	Charles Radbourn^{†}	2.05	
1884	Charles Radbourn^{†}	1.38	Providence Grays	Charlie Sweeney	1.55	
1885	Tim Keefe^{†}	1.58	New York Giants	Mickey Welch^{†}	1.66	
1886	Henry Boyle	1.76	St. Louis Maroons	Charlie Ferguson	1.96	
1887	Dan Casey	2.86	Philadelphia Phillies	Pete Conway	2.90	
1888	Tim Keefe^{†}	1.74	New York Giants	Ben Sanders	1.90	
1889	John Clarkson^{†}	2.73	Boston Beaneaters	Jersey Bakley	2.96	
1890	Billy Rhines	1.95	Cincinnati Reds	Kid Nichols^{†}	2.23	
1891	John Ewing	2.27	New York Giants	Kid Nichols^{†}	2.39	
1892	Cy Young^{†}	1.93	Cleveland Spiders	Tim Keefe^{†}	2.36	
1893	Ted Breitenstein	3.18	St. Louis Browns	Amos Rusie^{†}	3.23	
1894	Amos Rusie^{†}	2.78	New York Giants	Jouett Meekin	3.70	
1895	Al Maul	2.45	Washington Senators	Pink Hawley	3.18	
1896	Billy Rhines	2.45	Cincinnati Reds	Kid Nichols^{†}	2.83	
1897	Amos Rusie^{†}	2.54	New York Giants	Kid Nichols^{†}	2.64	
1898	Clark Griffith^{†}	1.88	Chicago Orphans	Al Maul	2.10	
1899	Vic Willis^{†}	2.50	Boston Beaneaters	Cy Young^{†}	2.58	
1900	Rube Waddell^{†}	2.37	Pittsburgh Pirates	Ned Garvin	2.41	
1901	Jesse Tannehill	2.18	Pittsburgh Pirates	Deacon Phillippe	2.22	
1902	Jack Taylor	1.33	Chicago Orphans	Noodles Hahn	1.77	
1903	Sam Leever	2.06	Pittsburgh Pirates	Christy Mathewson^{†}	2.26	
1904	Joe McGinnity^{†}	1.61	New York Giants	Ned Garvin	1.68	
1905	Christy Mathewson^{†}	1.28	New York Giants	Ed Reulbach	1.42	
1906	Mordecai Brown^{†}	1.04	Chicago Cubs	Jack Pfiester	1.51	
1907	Jack Pfiester	1.15	Chicago Cubs	Carl Lundgren	1.17	
1908	Christy Mathewson^{†}	1.43	New York Giants	Mordecai Brown^{†}	1.47	
1909	Christy Mathewson^{†}	1.14	New York Giants	Mordecai Brown^{†}	1.31	
1910	King Cole	1.80	Chicago Cubs	Mordecai Brown^{†}	1.86	
1911	Christy Mathewson^{†}	1.99	New York Giants	Lew Richie	2.31	
1912	Jeff Tesreau	1.96	New York Giants	Christy Mathewson^{†}	2.12	
1913	Christy Mathewson^{†}	2.06	New York Giants	Babe Adams	2.15	
1914	Bill Doak	1.72	St. Louis Cardinals	Bill James	1.90	
1915	Grover Cleveland Alexander^{†}	1.22	Philadelphia Phillies	Fred Toney	1.58	
1916	Grover Cleveland Alexander^{†}	1.55	Philadelphia Phillies	Rube Marquard^{†}	1.58	
1917	Fred Anderson	1.44	New York Giants	Grover Cleveland Alexander^{†}	1.83	
1918	Hippo Vaughn	1.74	Chicago Cubs	Lefty Tyler	2.00	
1919	Grover Cleveland Alexander^{†}	1.72	Chicago Cubs	Hippo Vaughn	1.79	
1920	Grover Cleveland Alexander^{†}	1.91	Chicago Cubs	Babe Adams	2.16	
1921	Bill Doak	2.59	St. Louis Cardinals	Babe Adams	2.64	
1922	Phil Douglas	2.63	New York Giants	Rosy Ryan	3.01	
1923	Dolf Luque	1.93	Cincinnati Reds	Eppa Rixey^{†}	2.80	
1924	Dazzy Vance^{†}	2.16	Brooklyn Robins	Hugh McQuillan	2.69	
1925	Dolf Luque	2.63	Cincinnati Reds	Eppa Rixey^{†}	2.88	
1926	Ray Kremer	2.61	Pittsburgh Pirates	Charlie Root	2.82	
1927	Ray Kremer	2.47	Pittsburgh Pirates	Grover Cleveland Alexander^{†}	2.52	
1928	Dazzy Vance^{†}	2.09	Brooklyn Robins	Sheriff Blake	2.47	
1929	Bill Walker	3.09	New York Giants	Burleigh Grimes^{†}	3.13	
1930	Dazzy Vance^{†}	2.61	Brooklyn Robins	Carl Hubbell^{†}	3.87	
1931	Bill Walker	2.26	New York Giants	Carl Hubbell^{†}	2.65	
1932	Lon Warneke	2.37	Chicago Cubs	Carl Hubbell^{†}	2.50	
1933	Carl Hubbell^{†}	1.66	New York Giants	Lon Warneke	2.00	
1934	Carl Hubbell^{†}	2.30	New York Giants	Dizzy Dean^{†}	2.66	
1935	Cy Blanton	2.58	Pittsburgh Pirates	Bill Swift	2.70	
1936	Carl Hubbell^{†}	2.31	New York Giants	Danny MacFayden	2.87	
1937	Jim Turner	2.38	Boston Bees	Cliff Melton	2.61	
1938	Bill Lee	2.66	Chicago Cubs	Charlie Root	2.86	
1939	Bucky Walters	2.29	Cincinnati Reds	Bob Bowman	2.60	
1940	Bucky Walters	2.48	Cincinnati Reds	Claude Passeau	2.50	
1941	Elmer Riddle	2.24	Cincinnati Reds	Whit Wyatt	2.34	
1942	Mort Cooper	1.78	St. Louis Cardinals	Johnny Beazley	2.13	
1943	Max Lanier	1.90	St. Louis Cardinals	Mort Cooper	2.30	
1944	Ed Heusser	2.38	Cincinnati Reds	Bucky Walters	2.40	
1945	Ray Prim	2.40	Chicago Cubs	Claude Passeau	2.46	
1946	Howie Pollet	2.10	St. Louis Cardinals	Johnny Sain	2.21	
1947	Warren Spahn^{†}	2.33	Boston Braves	Ewell Blackwell	2.47	
1948	Harry Brecheen	2.24	St. Louis Cardinals	Dutch Leonard	2.51	
1949	Dave Koslo	2.50	New York Giants	Jerry Staley	2.73	
1950	Sal Maglie	2.71	New York Giants	Ewell Blackwell	2.97	
1951	Chet Nichols Jr.	2.88	Boston Braves	Sal Maglie	2.93	
1952	Hoyt Wilhelm^{†}	2.43	New York Giants	Warren Hacker	2.58	
1953	Warren Spahn^{†}	2.10	Milwaukee Braves	Robin Roberts^{†}	2.75	
1954	Johnny Antonelli	2.30	New York Giants	Lew Burdette	2.76	
1955	Bob Friend	2.83	Pittsburgh Pirates	Don Newcombe	3.20	
1956	Lew Burdette	2.70	Milwaukee Braves	Warren Spahn^{†}	2.78	
1957	Johnny Podres	2.66	Brooklyn Dodgers	Don Drysdale^{†}	2.69	
1958	Stu Miller	2.47	San Francisco Giants	Sam Jones	2.88	
1959	Sam Jones	2.83	San Francisco Giants	Stu Miller	2.84	
1960	Mike McCormick	2.70	San Francisco Giants	Ernie Broglio	2.74	
1961	Warren Spahn^{†}	3.02	Milwaukee Braves	Jim O'Toole	3.10	
1962	Sandy Koufax^{†}	2.54	Los Angeles Dodgers	Bob Shaw	2.80	
1963	Sandy Koufax^{†}	1.88	Los Angeles Dodgers	Dick Ellsworth	2.11	
1964	Sandy Koufax^{†}	1.74	Los Angeles Dodgers	Don Drysdale^{†}	2.18	
1965	Sandy Koufax^{†}	2.04	Los Angeles Dodgers	Juan Marichal^{†}	2.13	
1966	Sandy Koufax^{†}	1.73	Los Angeles Dodgers	Mike Cuellar	2.22	
1967	Phil Niekro^{†}	1.87	Atlanta Braves	Jim Bunning^{†}	2.29	
1968	Bob Gibson^{†}	1.12	St. Louis Cardinals	Bobby Bolin	1.99	
1969	Juan Marichal^{†}	2.10	San Francisco Giants	Steve Carlton^{†}	2.17	
1970	Tom Seaver^{†}	2.82	New York Mets	Wayne Simpson	3.02	
1971	Tom Seaver^{†}	1.76	New York Mets	Dave Roberts	2.10	
1972	Steve Carlton^{†}	1.97	Philadelphia Phillies	Gary Nolan	1.99	
1973	Tom Seaver^{†}	2.08	New York Mets	Don Sutton^{†}	2.42	
1974	Buzz Capra	2.28	Atlanta Braves	Phil Niekro^{†}	2.38	
1975	Randy Jones	2.24	San Diego Padres	Andy Messersmith	2.29	
1976	John Denny	2.52	St. Louis Cardinals	Doug Rau	2.57	
1977	John Candelaria	2.34	Pittsburgh Pirates	Tom Seaver^{†}	2.58	
1978	Craig Swan	2.43	New York Mets	Steve Rogers	2.47	
1979	J. R. Richard	2.71	Houston Astros	Tom Hume	2.76	
1980	Don Sutton^{†}	2.20	Los Angeles Dodgers	Steve Carlton^{†}	2.34	
1981	Nolan Ryan^{†}	1.69	Houston Astros	Bob Knepper	2.18	
1982	Steve Rogers	2.40	Montreal Expos	Joe Niekro	2.47^{[a]}	
1983	Atlee Hammaker	2.25	San Francisco Giants	John Denny	2.37	
1984	Alejandro Peña	2.48	Los Angeles Dodgers	Dwight Gooden	2.60	
1985	Dwight Gooden	1.53	New York Mets	John Tudor	1.93	
1986	Mike Scott	2.22	Houston Astros	Bob Ojeda	2.57	
1987	Nolan Ryan^{†}	2.76	Houston Astros	Mike Dunne	3.03	
1988	Joe Magrane	2.18	St. Louis Cardinals	David Cone	2.22	
1989	Scott Garrelts	2.28	San Francisco Giants	Orel Hershiser	2.31	
1990	Danny Darwin	2.21	Houston Astros	Zane Smith	2.55	
1991	Dennis Martínez	2.39	Montreal Expos	José Rijo	2.51	
1992	Bill Swift	2.08	San Francisco Giants	Bob Tewksbury	2.16	
1993	Greg Maddux^{†}	2.36	Atlanta Braves	José Rijo	2.48	
1994	Greg Maddux^{†}	1.56	Atlanta Braves	Bret Saberhagen	2.74	
1995	Greg Maddux^{†}	1.63	Atlanta Braves	Hideo Nomo	2.54	
1996	Kevin Brown	1.89	Florida Marlins	Greg Maddux^{†}	2.72	
1997	Pedro Martínez^{†}	1.90	Montreal Expos	Greg Maddux^{†}	2.20	
1998	Greg Maddux^{†}	2.22	Atlanta Braves	Kevin Brown	2.38	
1999	Randy Johnson^{†}	2.48	Arizona Diamondbacks	Kevin Millwood	2.68	
2000	Kevin Brown	2.58	Los Angeles Dodgers	Randy Johnson^{†}	2.64	
2001	Randy Johnson^{†}	2.49	Arizona Diamondbacks	Curt Schilling	2.98	
2002	Randy Johnson^{†}	2.32	Arizona Diamondbacks	Greg Maddux^{†}	2.62	
2003	Jason Schmidt	2.34	San Francisco Giants	Kevin Brown	2.39	
2004	Jake Peavy	2.27	San Diego Padres	Randy Johnson^{†}	2.60	
2005	Roger Clemens	1.87	Houston Astros	Andy Pettitte	2.39	
2006	Roy Oswalt	2.98	Houston Astros	Chris Carpenter	3.09	
2007	Jake Peavy	2.54	San Diego Padres	Brandon Webb	3.01	
2008	Johan Santana	2.53	New York Mets	Tim Lincecum	2.62	
2009	Chris Carpenter	2.24	St. Louis Cardinals	Tim Lincecum	2.48	
2010	Josh Johnson	2.30	Florida Marlins	Adam Wainwright	2.42	
2011	Clayton Kershaw	2.28	Los Angeles Dodgers	Roy Halladay^{†}	2.35	
2012	Clayton Kershaw	2.53	Los Angeles Dodgers	R. A. Dickey	2.73	
2013	Clayton Kershaw	1.83	Los Angeles Dodgers	José Fernández	2.19	
2014	Clayton Kershaw	1.77	Los Angeles Dodgers	Johnny Cueto	2.25	
2015	Zack Greinke	1.66	Los Angeles Dodgers	Jake Arrieta	1.77	
2016	Kyle Hendricks	2.13	Chicago Cubs	Jon Lester	2.44	
2017	Clayton Kershaw	2.31	Los Angeles Dodgers	Max Scherzer	2.51	
2018	Jacob deGrom	1.70	New York Mets	Aaron Nola	2.37	
2019	Hyun-jin Ryu	2.32	Los Angeles Dodgers	Jacob deGrom	2.43	
2020	Trevor Bauer	1.73	Cincinnati Reds	Yu Darvish	2.01	
2021	Corbin Burnes	2.43	Milwaukee Brewers	Max Scherzer	2.46	
2022	Julio Urías	2.16	Los Angeles Dodgers	Sandy Alcántara	2.28	
2023	Blake Snell	2.25	San Diego Padres	Kodai Senga	2.98	
2024	Chris Sale	2.38	Atlanta Braves	Zack Wheeler	2.57	
2025	Paul Skenes	1.97	Pittsburgh Pirates	Yoshinobu Yamamoto	2.49	
2026	Jacob Misiorowski	1.80	Milwaukee Brewers	Chris Sale	2.16	

=== Notes ===
- ^{a} While Baseball-Reference.com lists both Niekro and Joaquín Andújar with an ERA of 2.47 in 1982, Niekro's average is lower (2.467) than Andújar's (2.473) if extended to three decimal places.

== American League ==
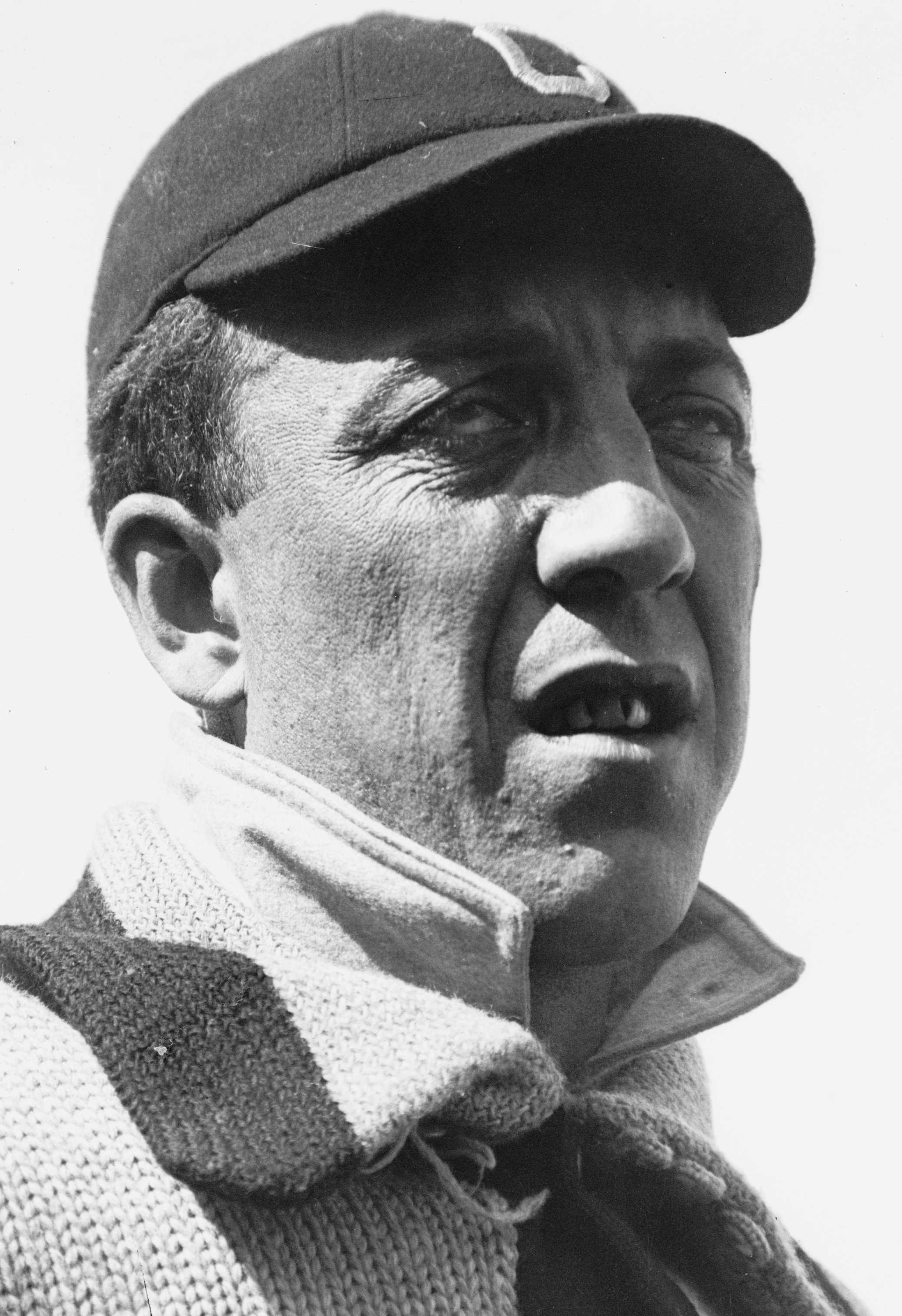
Addie Joss led the American League in ERA in 1904 and 1908.

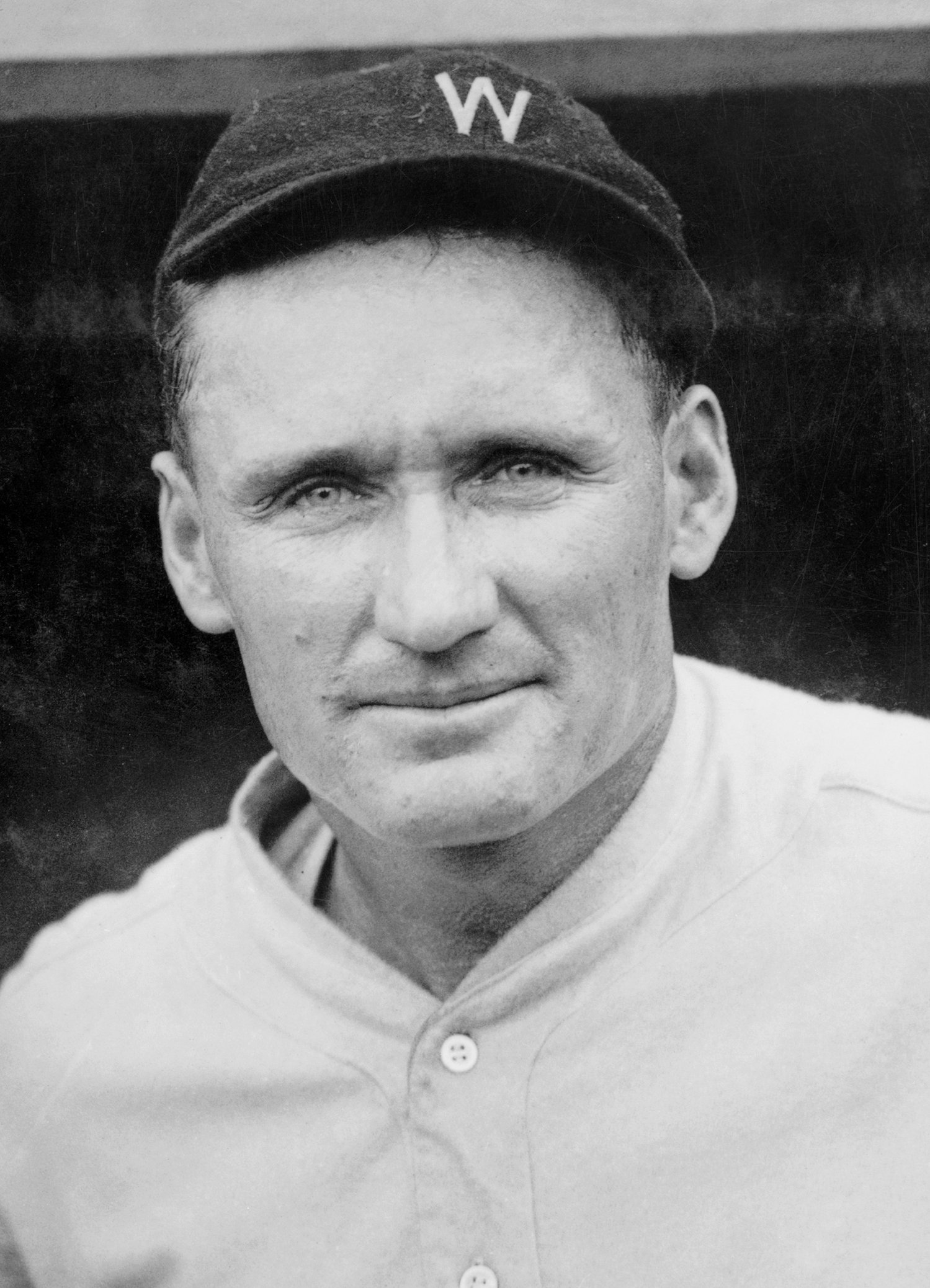
In addition to leading the American League in ERA five times in his career and winning three triple crowns, Walter Johnson was one of the five charter members of the Baseball Hall of Fame.

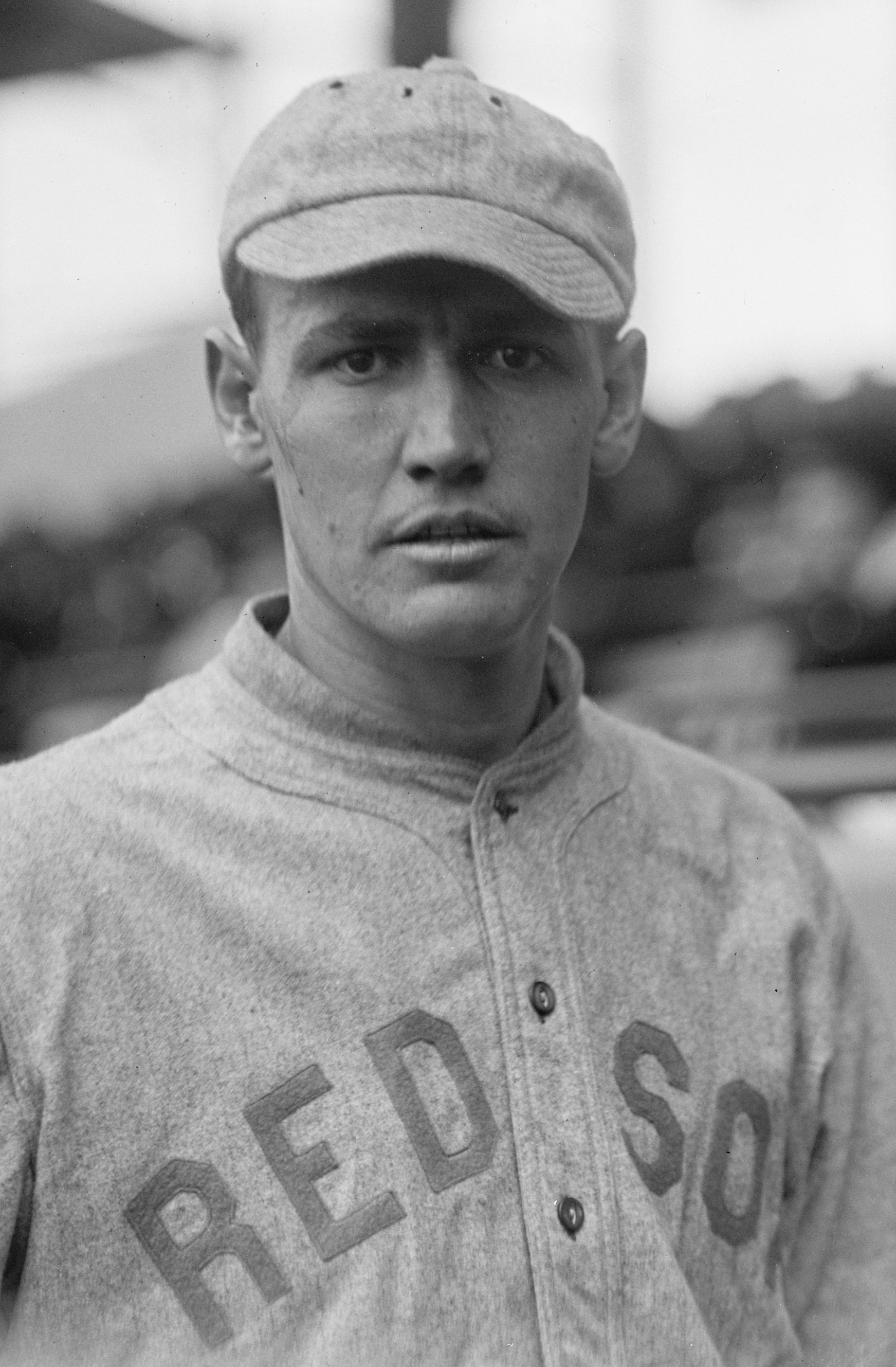
"Smoky" Joe Wood won 15 games in 1915 when he won the ERA title; he is one of thirteen pitchers who have won 30 games in a single season since 1900.

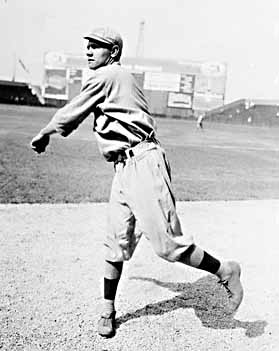
Babe Ruth led the league in ERA in 1916; he began his Major League Baseball career as a pitcher with the Boston Red Sox before converting to the outfield.

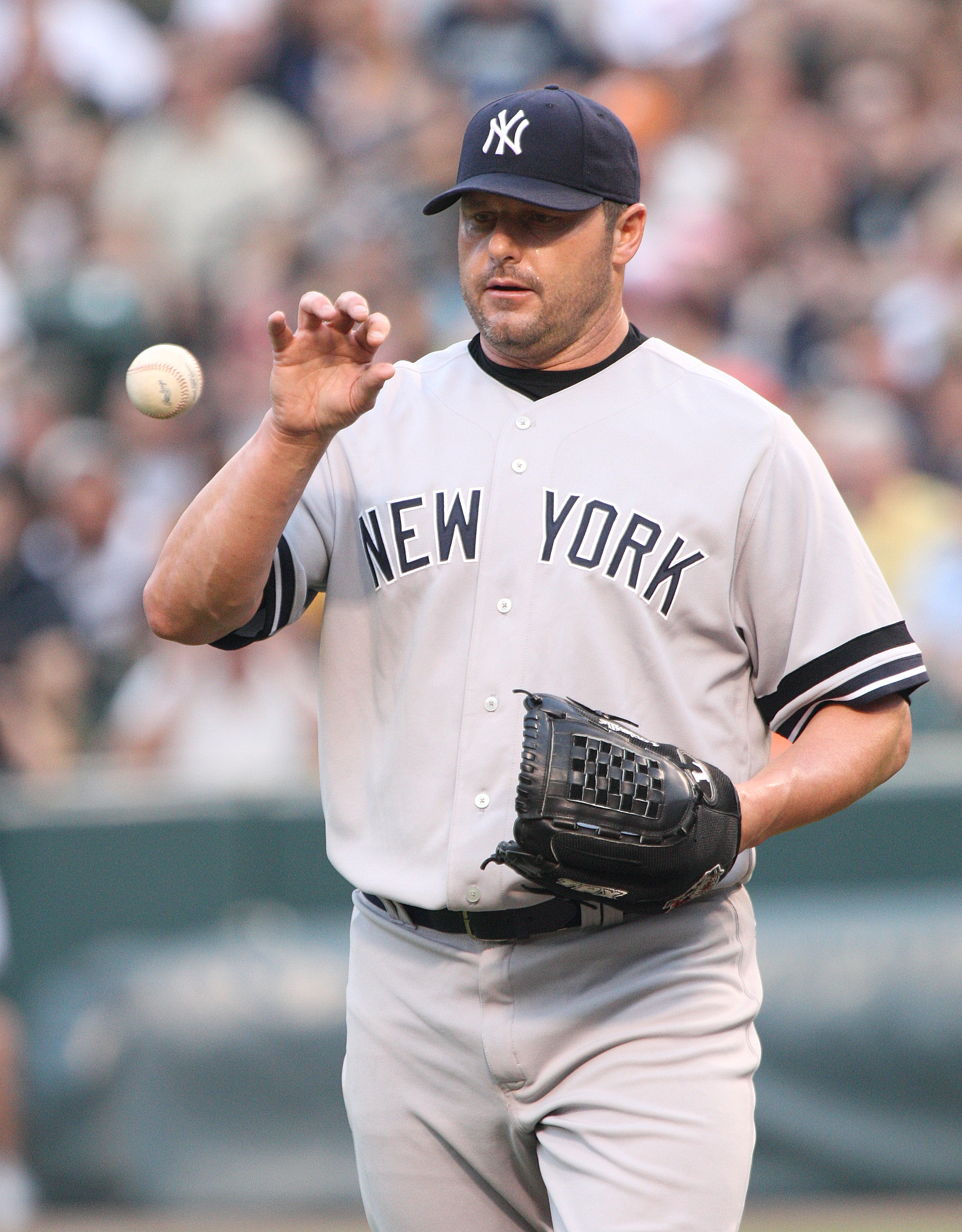
Roger Clemens' seven ERA championships are the second-most by any player in Major League Baseball history, behind Lefty Grove's nine.

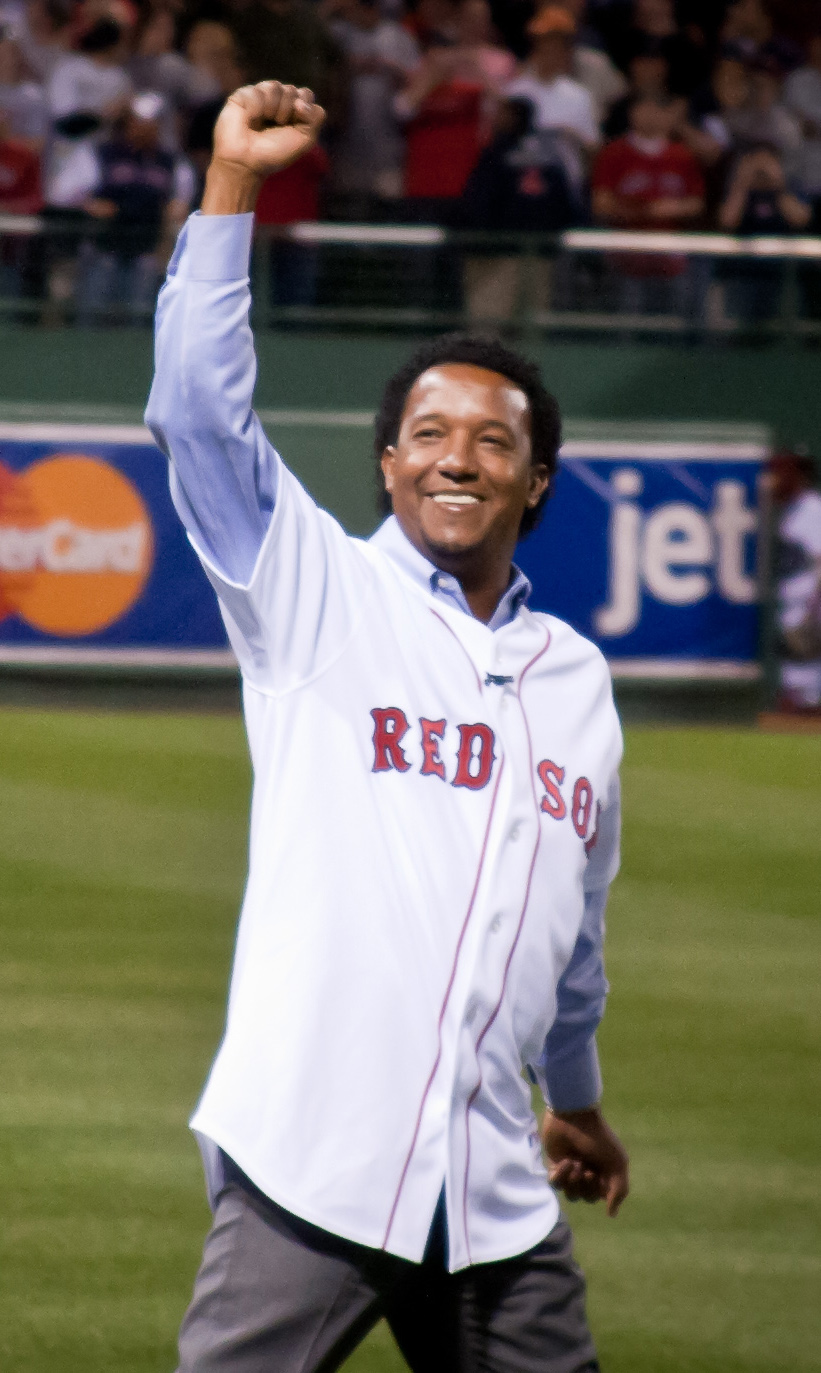
Pedro Martínez won five ERA titles across both leagues; his 2000 margin of victory over Clemens for the ERA title is the largest in Major League Baseball history.

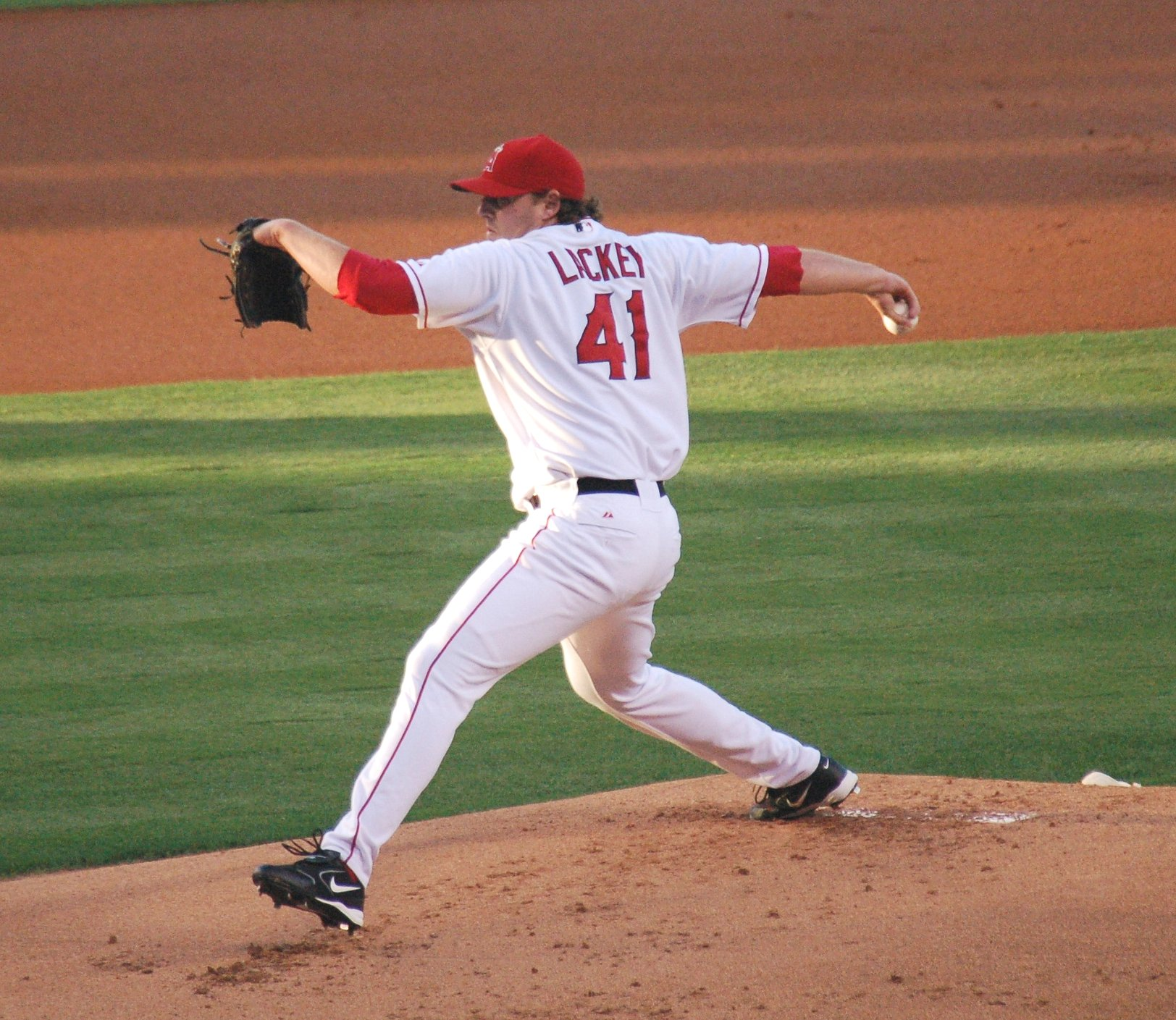
John Lackey's 3.01 ERA in 2007 led the American League.

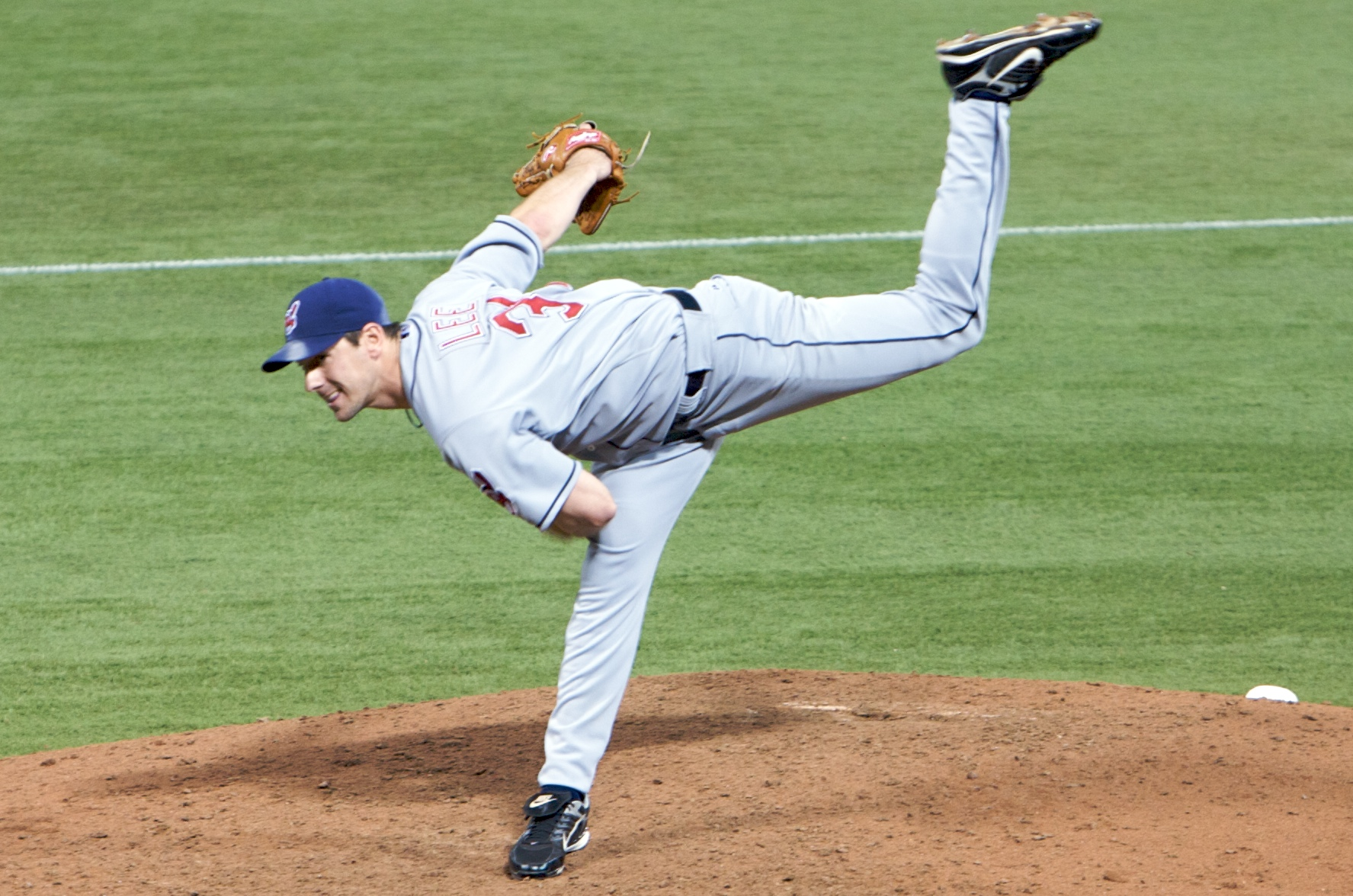
Cliff Lee won the Cy Young Award in 2008 in addition to the ERA title.

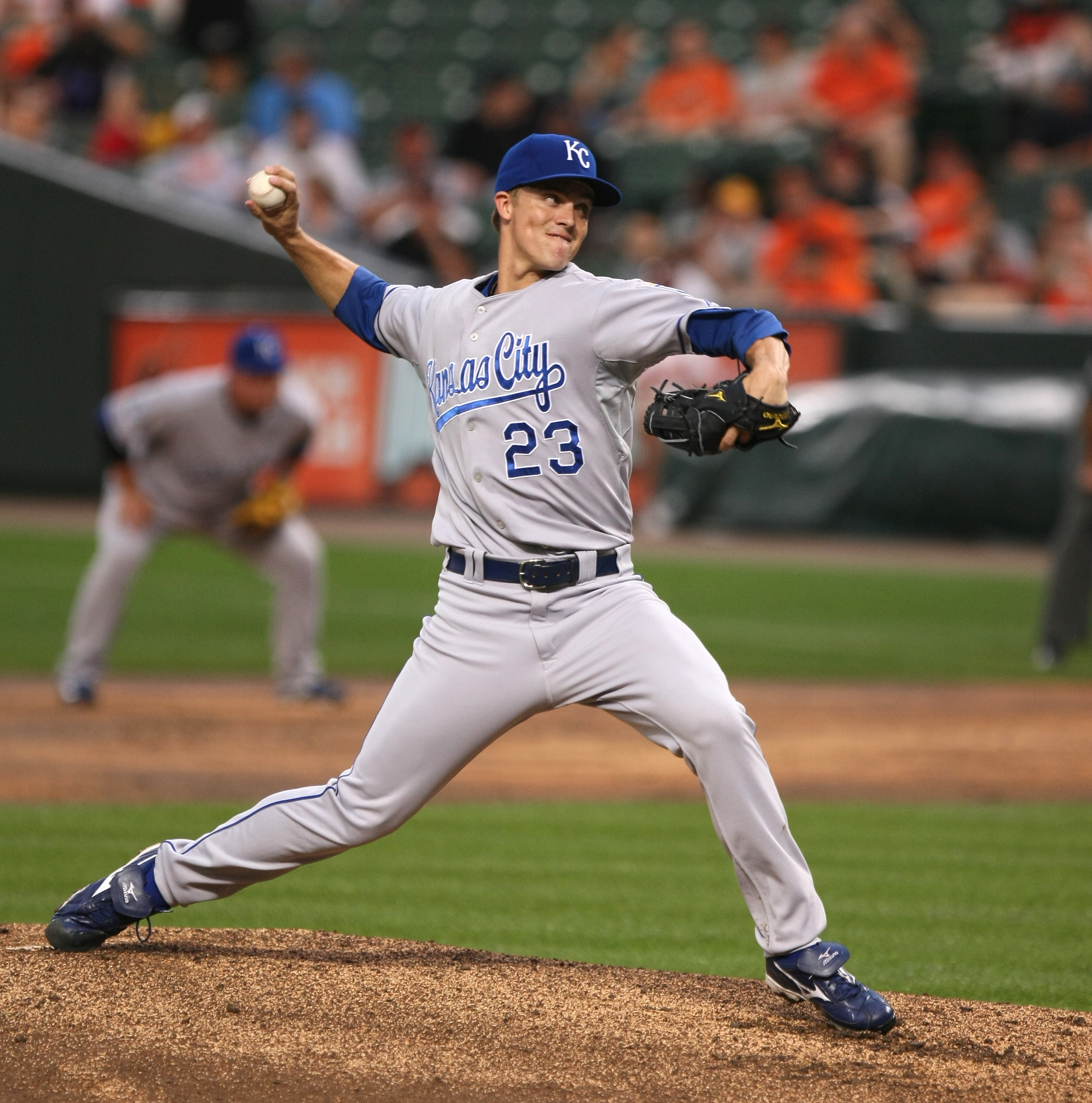
Zack Greinke, pitching for the Kansas City Royals, became the second consecutive pitcher to win the Cy Young Award and lead the American League in ERA in the same season.

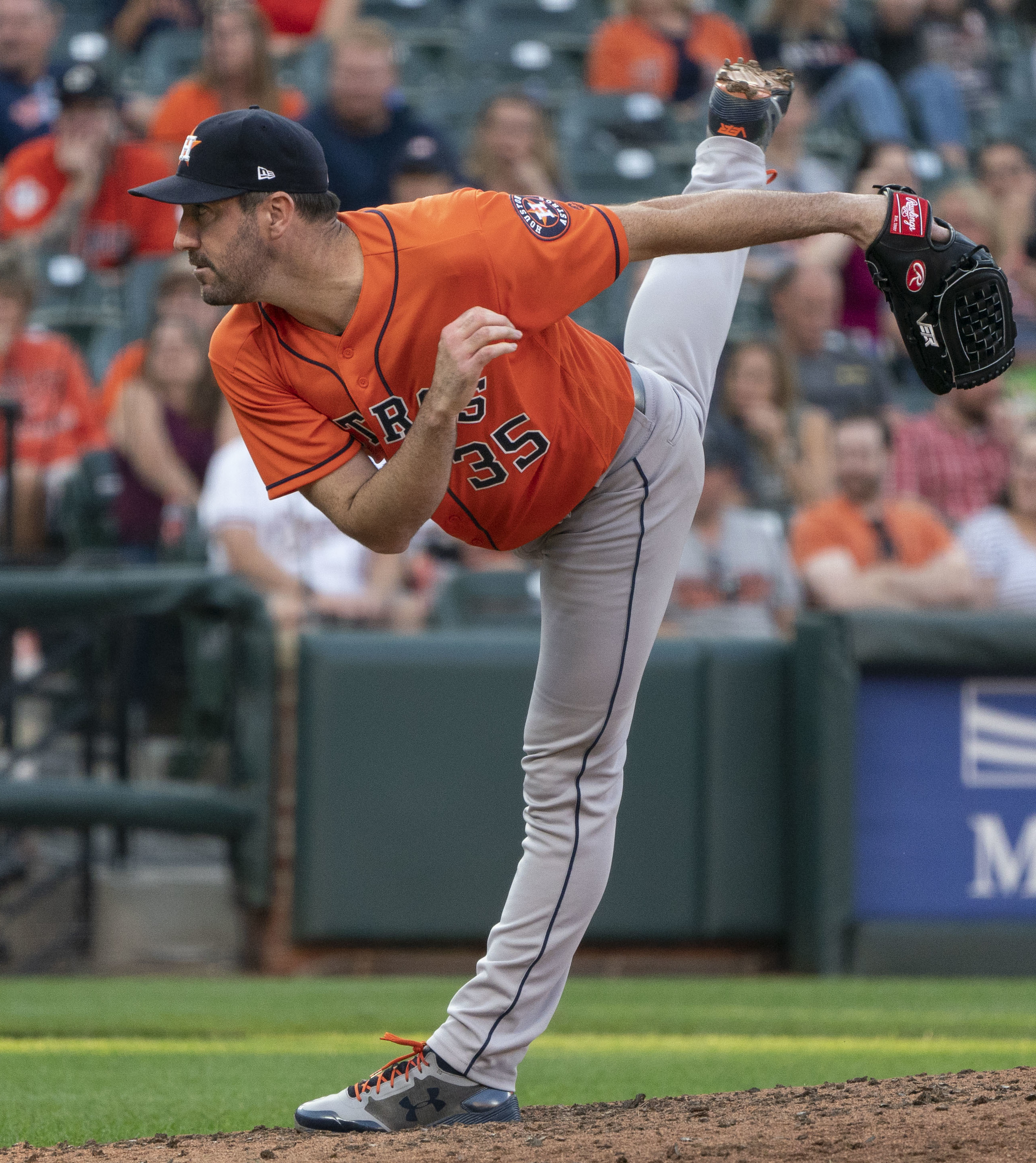
At 39 years old in 2022, Justin Verlander pitched to a 1.75 ERA after missing the previous season while recovering from Tommy John surgery, leading to his third career Cy Young Award.

Year	Leader	ERA	Team	Runner-up	ERA	Ref
1901	Cy Young^{†}	1.62	Boston Americans	Nixey Callahan	2.42	
1902	Ed Siever	1.91	Detroit Tigers	Rube Waddell^{†}	2.05	
1903	Earl Moore	1.74	Cleveland Naps	Cy Young^{†}	2.08	
1904	Addie Joss^{†}	1.59	Cleveland Naps	Rube Waddell^{†}	1.62	
1905	Rube Waddell^{†}	1.48	Philadelphia Athletics	Doc White	1.76	
1906	Doc White	1.52	Chicago White Sox	Barney Pelty	1.59	
1907	Ed Walsh^{†}	1.60	Chicago White Sox	Ed Killian	1.78	
1908	Addie Joss^{†}	1.16	Cleveland Naps	Cy Young^{†}	1.26	
1909	Harry Krause	1.39	Philadelphia Athletics	Ed Walsh^{†}	1.41	
1910	Ed Walsh^{†}	1.27	Chicago White Sox	Jack Coombs	1.30	
1911	Vean Gregg	1.80	Cleveland Naps	Walter Johnson^{†}	1.90	
1912	Walter Johnson^{†}	1.39	Washington Senators	Joe Wood	1.91	
1913	Walter Johnson^{†}	1.14	Washington Senators	Eddie Cicotte	1.58	
1914	Dutch Leonard	0.96	Boston Red Sox	Rube Foster	1.70	
1915	Joe Wood	1.49	Boston Red Sox	Walter Johnson^{†}	1.55	
1916	Babe Ruth^{†}	1.75	Boston Red Sox	Eddie Cicotte	1.78	
1917	Eddie Cicotte	1.53	Chicago White Sox	Carl Mays	1.74	
1918	Walter Johnson^{†}	1.27	Washington Senators	Stan Coveleski^{†}	1.82	
1919	Walter Johnson^{†}	1.49	Washington Senators	Eddie Cicotte	1.82	
1920	Bob Shawkey	2.45	New York Yankees	Stan Coveleski^{†}	2.49	
1921	Red Faber^{†}	2.48	Chicago White Sox	George Mogridge	3.00	
1922	Red Faber^{†}	2.81	Chicago White Sox	Herman Pillette	2.85	
1923	Stan Coveleski^{†}	2.76	Washington Senators	Waite Hoyt^{†}	3.02	
1924	Walter Johnson^{†}	2.72	Washington Senators	Tom Zachary	2.75	
1925	Stan Coveleski^{†}	2.84	Washington Senators	Herb Pennock^{†}	2.96	
1926	Lefty Grove^{†}	2.51	Philadelphia Athletics	George Uhle	2.83	
1927	Wilcy Moore	2.28	New York Yankees	Waite Hoyt^{†}	2.63	
1928	Garland Braxton	2.51	Washington Senators	Herb Pennock^{†}	2.56	
1929	Lefty Grove^{†}	2.81	Philadelphia Athletics	Firpo Marberry	3.06	
1930	Lefty Grove^{†}	2.54	Philadelphia Athletics	Wes Ferrell	3.31	
1931	Lefty Grove^{†}	2.06	Philadelphia Athletics	Lefty Gomez^{†}	2.67	
1932	Lefty Grove^{†}	2.84	Philadelphia Athletics	Red Ruffing^{†}	3.09	
1933	Mel Harder	2.95	Cleveland Indians	Tommy Bridges	3.09	
1934	Lefty Gomez^{†}	2.33	New York Yankees	Mel Harder	2.61	
1935	Lefty Grove^{†}	2.70	Boston Red Sox	Ted Lyons^{†}	3.02	
1936	Lefty Grove^{†}	2.81	Boston Red Sox	Johnny Allen	3.44	
1937	Lefty Gomez^{†}	2.33	New York Yankees	Monty Stratton	2.40	
1938	Lefty Grove^{†}	3.08	Boston Red Sox	Red Ruffing^{†}	3.31	
1939	Lefty Grove^{†}	2.54	Boston Red Sox	Ted Lyons^{†}	2.76	
1940	Bob Feller^{†}	2.61	Cleveland Indians	Bobo Newsom	2.83	
1941	Thornton Lee	2.37	Chicago White Sox	Al Benton	2.97	
1942	Ted Lyons^{†}	2.10	Chicago White Sox	Tiny Bonham	2.27	
1943	Spud Chandler	1.64	New York Yankees	Tiny Bonham	2.27	
1944	Dizzy Trout	2.12	Detroit Tigers	Hal Newhouser^{†}	2.22	
1945	Hal Newhouser^{†}	1.81	Detroit Tigers	Al Benton	2.02	
1946	Hal Newhouser^{†}	1.94	Detroit Tigers	Spud Chandler	2.10	
1947	Joe Haynes	2.42	Chicago White Sox	Bob Feller^{†}	2.68	
1948	Gene Bearden	2.43	Cleveland Indians	Ray Scarborough	2.82^{[a]}	
1949	Mike Garcia	2.36	Cleveland Indians	Mel Parnell	2.77	
1950	Early Wynn^{†}	3.20	Cleveland Indians	Ned Garver	3.39	
1951	Saul Rogovin	2.78	Chicago White Sox; Detroit Tigers	Ed Lopat	2.91	
1952	Allie Reynolds	2.06	New York Yankees	Mike Garcia	2.37	
1953	Ed Lopat	2.42	New York Yankees	Billy Pierce	2.72	
1954	Mike Garcia	2.64	Cleveland Indians	Sandy Consuegra	2.69	
1955	Billy Pierce	1.97	Chicago White Sox	Whitey Ford^{†}	2.63	
1956	Whitey Ford^{†}	2.47	New York Yankees	Herb Score	2.53	
1957	Bobby Shantz	2.45	New York Yankees	Tom Sturdivant	2.54	
1958	Whitey Ford^{†}	2.01	New York Yankees	Billy Pierce	2.68	
1959	Hoyt Wilhelm^{†}	2.19	Baltimore Orioles	Camilo Pascual	2.64	
1960	Frank Baumann	2.67	Chicago White Sox	Jim Bunning^{†}	2.79	
1961	Dick Donovan	2.40	Washington Senators	Bill Stafford	2.68	
1962	Hank Aguirre	2.21	Detroit Tigers	Robin Roberts^{†}	2.78	
1963	Gary Peters	2.33	Chicago White Sox	Juan Pizarro	2.39	
1964	Dean Chance	1.65	Los Angeles Angels	Joe Horlen	1.88	
1965	Sam McDowell	2.18	Cleveland Indians	Eddie Fisher	2.40	
1966	Gary Peters	1.98	Chicago White Sox	Joe Horlen	2.43	
1967	Joe Horlen	2.06	Chicago White Sox	Gary Peters	2.28	
1968	Luis Tiant	1.60	Cleveland Indians	Sam McDowell	1.81	
1969	Dick Bosman	2.19	Washington Senators	Jim Palmer^{†}	2.34	
1970	Diego Seguí	2.56	Oakland Athletics	Jim Palmer^{†}	2.71	
1971	Vida Blue	1.82	Oakland Athletics	Wilbur Wood	1.91	
1972	Luis Tiant	1.91	Boston Red Sox	Gaylord Perry^{†}	1.92	
1973	Jim Palmer^{†}	2.40	Baltimore Orioles	Bert Blyleven^{†}	2.52	
1974	Catfish Hunter^{†}	2.49	Oakland Athletics	Gaylord Perry^{†}	2.51	
1975	Jim Palmer^{†}	2.09	Baltimore Orioles	Catfish Hunter^{†}	2.58	
1976	Mark Fidrych	2.34	Detroit Tigers	Vida Blue	2.35	
1977	Frank Tanana	2.54	California Angels	Bert Blyleven^{†}	2.72	
1978	Ron Guidry	1.74	New York Yankees	Jon Matlack	2.27	
1979	Ron Guidry	2.78	New York Yankees	Tommy John	2.96	
1980	Rudy May	2.46	New York Yankees	Mike Norris	2.53	
1981	Sammy Stewart	2.32 ^{[d]}	Baltimore Orioles	Steve McCatty	2.33	
1982	Rick Sutcliffe	2.96	Cleveland Indians	Bob Stanley	3.10	
1983	Rick Honeycutt	2.42	Texas Rangers	Mike Boddicker	2.77	
1984	Mike Boddicker	2.79	Baltimore Orioles	Dave Stieb	2.83	
1985	Dave Stieb	2.48	Toronto Blue Jays	Charlie Leibrandt	2.69	
1986	Roger Clemens	2.48	Boston Red Sox	Teddy Higuera	2.79	
1987	Jimmy Key	2.76	Toronto Blue Jays	Frank Viola	2.90	
1988	Allan Anderson	2.45^{[b]}	Minnesota Twins	Teddy Higuera	2.45^{[c]}	
1989	Bret Saberhagen	2.16	Kansas City Royals	Chuck Finley	2.57	
1990	Roger Clemens	1.93	Boston Red Sox	Chuck Finley	2.40	
1991	Roger Clemens	2.62	Boston Red Sox	Tom Candiotti	2.65	
1992	Roger Clemens	2.41	Boston Red Sox	Kevin Appier	2.46	
1993	Kevin Appier	2.56	Kansas City Royals	Wilson Álvarez	2.95	
1994	Steve Ontiveros	2.65	Oakland Athletics	Roger Clemens	2.85	
1995	Randy Johnson^{†}	2.48	Seattle Mariners	Tim Wakefield	2.95	
1996	Juan Guzmán	2.93	Toronto Blue Jays	Pat Hentgen	3.22	
1997	Roger Clemens	2.05	Toronto Blue Jays	Randy Johnson^{†}	2.28	
1998	Roger Clemens	2.65	Toronto Blue Jays	Pedro Martínez^{†}	2.89	
1999	Pedro Martínez^{†}	2.07	Boston Red Sox	David Cone	3.44	
2000	Pedro Martínez^{†}	1.74	Boston Red Sox	Roger Clemens	3.70	
2001	Freddy García	3.05	Seattle Mariners	Mike Mussina^{†}	3.15	
2002	Pedro Martínez^{†}	2.26	Boston Red Sox	Derek Lowe	2.58	
2003	Pedro Martínez^{†}	2.22	Boston Red Sox	Tim Hudson	2.70	
2004	Johan Santana	2.61	Minnesota Twins	Curt Schilling	3.26	
2005	Kevin Millwood	2.86	Cleveland Indians	Johan Santana	2.87	
2006	Johan Santana	2.77	Minnesota Twins	Roy Halladay^{†}	3.19	
2007	John Lackey	3.01	Los Angeles Angels of Anaheim	Fausto Carmona	3.06	
2008	Cliff Lee	2.54	Cleveland Indians	Roy Halladay^{†}	2.78	
2009	Zack Greinke	2.16	Kansas City Royals	Félix Hernández	2.49	
2010	Félix Hernández	2.27	Seattle Mariners	Clay Buchholz	2.33	
2011	Justin Verlander	2.40	Detroit Tigers	Jered Weaver	2.41	
2012	David Price	2.56	Tampa Bay Rays	Justin Verlander	2.64	
2013	Aníbal Sánchez	2.57	Detroit Tigers	Bartolo Colón	2.65	
2014	Félix Hernández	2.14	Seattle Mariners	Chris Sale	2.17	
2015	David Price	2.45	Detroit Tigers; Toronto Blue Jays	Dallas Keuchel	2.48	
2016	Aaron Sanchez	3.00	Toronto Blue Jays	Justin Verlander	3.04	
2017	Corey Kluber	2.25	Cleveland Indians	Chris Sale	2.90	
2018	Blake Snell	1.89	Tampa Bay Rays	Trevor Bauer	2.21	
2019	Gerrit Cole	2.50	Houston Astros	Justin Verlander	2.58	
2020	Shane Bieber	1.63	Cleveland Indians	Dallas Keuchel	1.99	
2021	Robbie Ray	2.84	Toronto Blue Jays	Lance McCullers Jr.	3.16	
2022	Justin Verlander	1.75	Houston Astros	Dylan Cease	2.20	
2023	Gerrit Cole	2.63	New York Yankees	Sonny Gray	2.79	
2024	Tarik Skubal	2.39	Detroit Tigers	Ronel Blanco	2.80	
2025	Tarik Skubal	2.21	Detroit Tigers	Hunter Brown	2.43	
2026	Cam Schlittler	1.95	New York Yankees	Dylan Cease	2.40	

=== Notes ===
- ^{a} While Baseball-Reference.com lists both Scarborough and Hall of Famer Bob Lemon with an ERA of 2.82 in 1948, Scarborough's average is lower (2.817) than Lemon's (2.820) if extended to three decimal places.
- ^{b} ^{c} While Baseball-Reference lists both Anderson and Higuera with an ERA of 2.45 in 1988, Anderson's average is lower (2.446) than Higuera's (2.455) if extended to three decimal places.
- ^{d} Until 1981, the rules stated that the number of innings pitched should be rounded to the nearest whole inning. This explains why McCatty was, at the time, awarded the 1981 ERA title, although his ERA appears to be slightly higher than that of Stewart.

== Negro Major Leagues ==
=== Negro National League I ===
Year	Leader	ERA	Team	Runner-up	ERA	Ref
1920	Dave Brown	1.82	Chicago American Giants	Tom Williams	1.83	
1921	Bullet Rogan^{†}	1.72	Kansas City Monarchs	Dave Brown	2.50	
1922	Lucius Hampton	2.49	Indianapolis ABCs	Juan Padrón	2.74	
1923	Ed Rile	2.53	Chicago American Giants	Bullet Rogan^{†}	2.94	
1924	Bill Foster^{†}	2.16	Chicago American Giants / Memphis Red Sox	Juan Padrón	2.17	
1925	Bill Foster^{†}	1.62	Birmingham Black Barons / Chicago American Giants	Bullet Rogan^{†}	1.74	
1926	Bill Foster^{†}	1.80	Chicago American Giants	Chet Brewer	2.37	
1927	Bill Foster^{†}	2.03	Chicago American Giants	William Bell	2.17	
1928	Willie Powell	2.00	Chicago American Giants	Ted Trent	2.21	
1929	Chet Brewer	1.93	Kansas City Monarchs	Yellowhorse Morris	1.98	
1930	Ted Radcliffe	2.58	St. Louis Stars	Satchel Paige^{†}	2.87	
1931	Logan Hensley	1.63	St. Louis Stars	Nelson Dean	2.06	

=== Eastern Colored League ===
Year	Leader	ERA	Team	Runner-up	ERA	Ref
1923	Nip Winters	2.36	Hilldale Club	Red Ryan	2.48	
1924	Dave Brown	2.00	New York Lincoln Giants	Rats Henderson	2.58	
1925	George Britt	3.01	Baltimore Black Sox	Nip Winters	3.02	
1926	Willis Flournoy	2.32	Brooklyn Royal Giants	Rats Henderson	2.58	
1927	Darltie Cooper	2.51	Harrisburg Giants	Rats Henderson	2.86	
1928	Jimmy Shields	1.51	Baltimore Black Sox	Laymon Yokely	2.77 (Note: Juanelo Mirabal also finished with a 2.77 ERA; however, when calculated to three decimal places, Yokely's ERA was 2.772 and Mirabal's was 2.773.)	

=== American Negro League ===
Year	Leader	ERA	Team	Runner-up	ERA	Ref
1929	Joe Strong	2.71	Hilldale Club / Homestead Grays	Smokey Joe Williams^{†}	3.26	

=== East–West League ===
Year	Leader	ERA	Team	Runner-up	ERA	Ref
1932	Joe Strong	2.07	Homestead Grays	William Bell	2.47	

=== Negro Southern League ===
Year	Leader	ERA	Team	Runner-up	ERA	Ref
1932	Red Parnell	0.83	Monroe Monarchs	Everett Nelson	1.76	

=== Negro National League II ===
Year	Leader	ERA	Team	Runner-up	ERA	Ref
1933	Satchel Paige^{†}	1.94	Pittsburgh Crawfords	Percy Bailey	2.03	
1934	Slim Jones	1.29	Philadelphia Stars	Satchel Paige^{†}	1.54	
1935	Leroy Matlock	1.52	Pittsburgh Crawfords	Neck Stanley	2.47	
1936	Jim Willis	2.84	Washington Elite Giants	Bill Holland	3.18	
1937	Roy Welmaker	2.31	Homestead Grays	Terris McDuffie	2.96	
1938	Ray Brown^{†}	1.88	Homestead Grays	Bill Holland	2.48	
1939	Roy Partlow	1.74	Homestead Grays	James Brown	1.89	
1940	Ray Brown^{†}	2.07	Homestead Grays	Emery Adams	3.17	
1941	Bill Byrd	2.23	Baltimore Elite Giants	Johnny Wright	2.36	
1942	Roy Partlow	1.69	Homestead Grays	Leon Day^{†}	1.73	
1943	Johnny Wright	2.54	Homestead Grays	Dave Barnhill	2.83	
1944	Donald Troy	1.63	Baltimore Elite Giants	Barney Morris	2.16	
1945	Garnett Blair	0.96	Homestead Grays	Johnny Wright	1.38	
1946	Rufus Lewis	1.97	Newark Eagles	Leon Day^{†}	2.39	
1947	Lino Donoso	2.30	New York Cubans	Amos Watson	2.31	
1948	Bill Ricks	1.56	Baltimore Elite Giants	Max Manning	1.59	

=== Negro American League ===
Year	Leader	ERA	Team	Runner-up	ERA	Ref
1937	Gene Bremer	1.47	Cincinnati Tigers	Hilton Smith^{†}	1.66	
1938	Hilton Smith^{†}	1.92	Kansas City Monarchs	Telosh Howard	2.01	
1939	Felix Evans	1.86	Indianapolis ABCs/Atlanta Black Crackers	George Walker	1.99	
1940	George Walker	1.29	Kansas City Monarchs	Johnny Wright	2.40	
1941	Gready McKinnis	1.04	Birmingham Black Barons	Ford Smith	1.69	
1942	Smoky Owens	1.83	Cincinnati-Cleveland Buckeyes	Jack Matchett	1.92	
1943	Theolic Smith	2.22	Cleveland Buckeyes	Rosey Davis	2.35	
1944	Robert Keyes	0.64	Memphis Red Sox	Satchel Paige^{†}	1.10	
1945	Rosey Davis	1.65	Cleveland Buckeyes / Cincinnati-Indianapolis Clowns	Gene Bremer	2.25	
1946	Satchel Paige^{†}	1.29	Kansas City Monarchs	Angel García	1.36	
1947	Gene Richardson	1.33	Kansas City Monarchs	Ford Smith	2.00	
1948	Ford Smith	2.43	Kansas City Monarchs	Jimmy Newberry	2.62	

== Footnotes ==
- ^{a} This is shown in the mathematical formula at right.
- ^{b} Recognized "major leagues" include the current American and National Leagues and several defunct leagues—the American Association, the Federal League, the Players' League, and the Union Association.
- ^{c} A pitcher must average throwing at least one inning per game scheduled for his team during the season (currently 162 innings per 162 games) to qualify for the ERA title.

== See also ==
- Adjusted ERA+
- Defense-Independent ERA
- List of Major League Baseball leaders in career ERA
- Run average
