= Jimmy Shields (baseball) =

American baseball player (1905–1963)

- Pitcher
- Born: September 8, 1905; Petersburg, Virginia, U.S.
- Died: November 21, 1963 (aged 58); Petersburg, Virginia, U.S.
- Threw: Right

Negro league baseball debut
- 1928, for the Bacharach Giants

Last appearance
- 1929, for the Bacharach Giants

Teams
- Bacharach Giants (1928–1929)

Career highlights and awards
- Eastern Colored League ERA leader (1928)

James Edward Shields Jr. (September 8, 1905 – November 21, 1963) was an American Negro league pitcher in 1928 and 1929.

A native of Petersburg, Virginia, Shields attended Peabody High School and Virginia Union University. He broke into the Negro leagues in 1928 with the Bacharach Giants, and posted a 3–2 record on the mound. Shields died in Petersburg in 1963 at age 58.
