= Margaret Sullivan (journalist) =

American media columnist

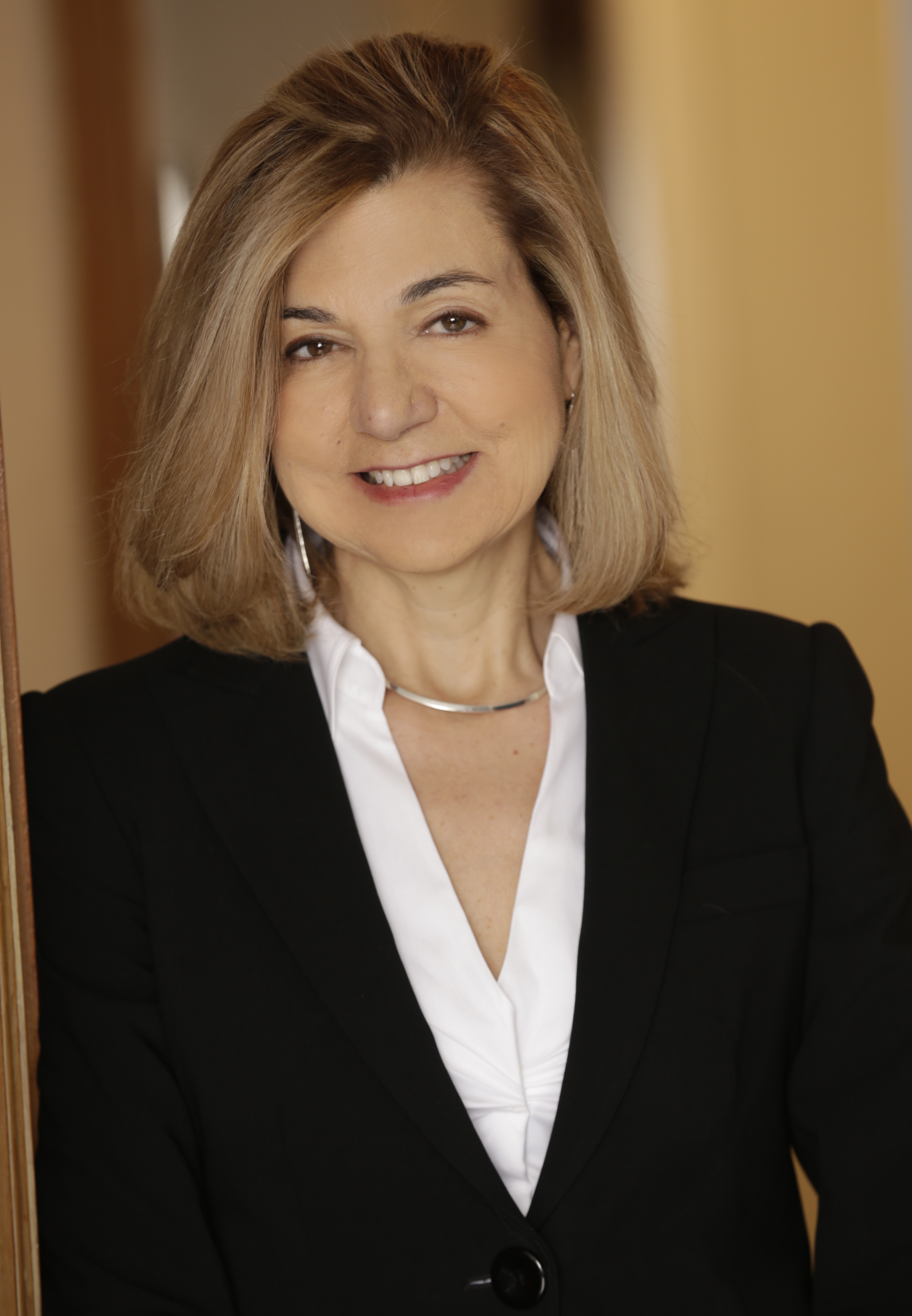
- Sullivan in 2016
- Born: Margaret M. Sullivan; May 1, 1957 (age 69); Lackawanna, New York, US
- Education: Georgetown University; Northwestern University
- Occupations: Journalist; columnist; editor
- Employers: The Guardian; Duke University; The Washington Post; The New York Times; The Buffalo News
- Spouse: Charles Anzalone (m. 1985; div. 2007)

Margaret M. Sullivan (born 1957) is an American journalist who is the media, politics and culture columnist for The Guardian US. Her previous roles include a two year appointment directing the Craig Newmark Center for Journalism Ethics and Security at Columbia Journalism School, media columnist for The Washington Post, serving as the fifth public editor of The New York Times, and as editor and vice-president of The Buffalo News.

== Biography ==
Sullivan is a native of Lackawanna, New York. She is the daughter of John Sullivan, an attorney, and Elaine Saab Sullivan, a department store buyer and school teacher. She graduated from Nardin Academy in Buffalo, where she served as editor in chief of the school newspaper and captain of the basketball team. She is a graduate of Georgetown University. She also holds an M.S.J. from Northwestern University's Medill School of Journalism. Sullivan joined The Buffalo News in 1980 as a summer intern, becoming the paper's first female editor in 1999. In 1985, she married fellow Buffalo News journalist Charles Anzalone. They had two children before divorcing in 2007.

Sullivan was appointed to the Pulitzer Prize Board in 2011. She has been a juror several times and has served as the chairwoman of the commentary jury in 2006. She has been elected a director of the American Society of News Editors and led its First Amendment committee. Sullivan is also the author of Ghosting the News: Local Journalism and the Crisis of American Democracy, which was published by Columbia Global Reports in 2020, and her memoir, Newsroom Confidential: Lessons (and Worries) from an Ink-Stained Life, which was published by St. Martin's Press in 2022. In a New York Times review Steve Coll, the former dean of Columbia Journalism School called Sullivan "the critic American journalism requires, a veteran practitioner with street cred, still in touch with the 'unaccountable joy' of reporting and writing that continues to draw talented young people to the field."

== Career ==
=== The Buffalo News ===
Sullivan was the first woman to serve as the editor and as the managing editor of The Buffalo News, the largest newspaper in Western New York, after previously working as a reporter and columnist. Sullivan focused The Buffalo News's reporting on poverty, economic development and inequities in public education and established its first investigative team. During her tenure the Buffalo News received the New York News Publishers Association for Distinguished Community Service seven years running.

She was criticized for the newspaper's reporting of the 2010 City Grill shooting, after she allowed the victims' criminal records to be published as a front-page story. Buffalo's black community responded by staging public burnings of the newspaper in protest. After meeting with community leaders, she made changes to improve the paper's coverage of the black community and established a community advisory board.

=== The New York Times ===
In the New York Times announcement of Sullivan's appointment on July 16, 2012, former executive editor Jill Abramson said, "Margaret has exactly the right experience to assume this critical role for us at this time. She has an impressive 32-year background in print journalism where she has distinguished herself as a reporter, columnist, editor and manager. And critically for us at this time, she has shown adeptness at embracing new platforms and engaging and interacting with readers in real time online, in print and in person." Unlike previous public editors of The New York Times, Sullivan signed on for four years.

In December 2015, Sullivan announced that she was not renewing her contract with The Times. Sullivan stated that "The role really requires an outsider's perspective, so I've thought all along that having a clear time limit serves The Times and its readers best."

Her tenure was celebrated by both journalists and readers. "Her tenure accomplished many things, most importantly the potential of web-based media reporting and criticism to combat the media establishment's groupthink," Eric Alterman observed.

=== Washington Post ===
In February 2016, it was announced that when Sullivan left The Times, she would be joining The Washington Post as its media columnist. Arthur Sulzberger Jr., The Times's publisher, praised Sullivan in a memo to staff stating that she had "ushered the position into a new age." Her first column in The Washington Post ran on May 22, 2016. On August 10, 2022, Sullivan announced her departure in memo to staff, calling it a "self-imposed term limit". On the same day, Duke University named Sullivan as their 2023 Egan Visiting professor. Sullivan's final column for The Post was published on August 21, 2022.

=== The Guardian ===
Since January 2023, Sullivan has been a media, politics, and culture columnist for The Guardian US.

=== Columbia University ===
On Jan. 1, 2024, Sullivan began a two-year appointment as executive director for the Craig Newmark Center for Journalism Ethics and Security at Columbia University. She has previously taught Audience and Engagement courses at Columbia.

== Awards ==
In 2020, Sullivan was awarded the Mirror Award for her Post article on the media coverage of Donald Trump's first impeachment. The same year she won the Penn State University Bart Richards Award for Media Criticism. She also won the 2023 AEJMC First Amendment Award in 2023. In 2023 she was elected to the American Academy of Arts & Sciences.

Media offices
Preceded by Arthur S. Brisbane	Public Editor for The New York Times; 2012-2016	Succeeded by Liz Spayd
