= Daniel Okrent =

American writer and editor (born 1948)

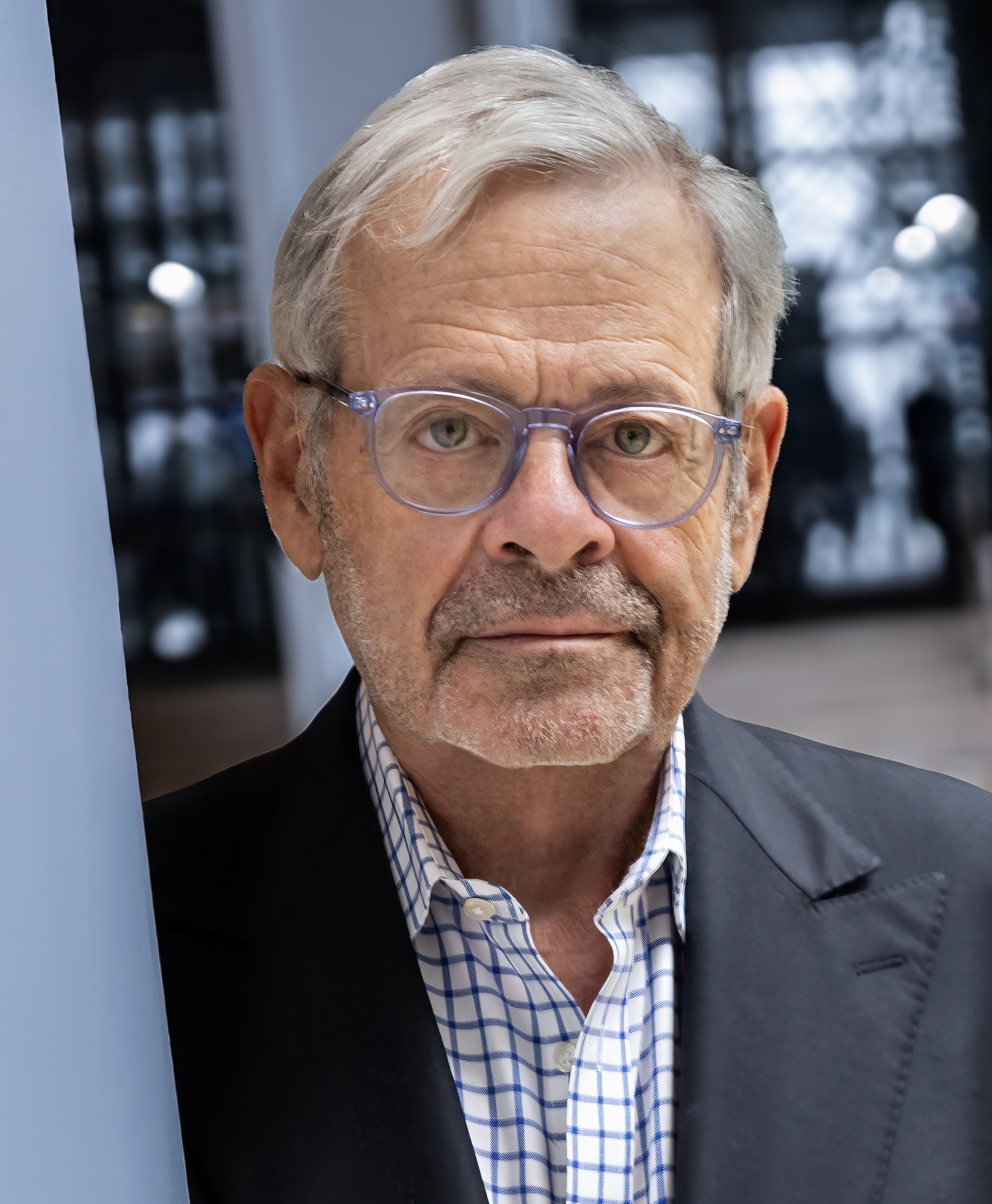
- Born: Detroit, Michigan, U.S.
- Education: University of Michigan
- Occupations: writer; editor
- Spouse: Rebecca Okrent
- Children: John Okrent, Lydia Okrent
- Website: www.danielokrent.com

Daniel Okrent (born April 2, 1948) is an American writer and editor. He is best known for having served as the first public editor of The New York Times newspaper, inventing Rotisserie League Baseball, and for writing several history books. (His Last Call: The Rise and Fall of Prohibition served as a major source for the 2011 Ken Burns/Lynn Novick miniseries Prohibition). In November 2011, Last Call won the Albert J. Beveridge prize, awarded by the American Historical Association to the year's best book of American history. In 2019, he published The Guarded Gate: Bigotry, Eugenics, and the Law That Kept Two Generations of Jews, Italians, and Other European Immigrants Out of America. His most recent book is Stephen Sondheim: Art Isn't Easy (2026).

== Early life and education ==
Born to a Jewish family in Detroit, Michigan, Okrent graduated from Cass Technical High School in Detroit in 1965. He earned a BA degree from the University of Michigan, where he says he mostly worked on the university's student newspaper The Michigan Daily.

== Career ==
Most of his career has been spent as an editor, at such places as Alfred A. Knopf; Harcourt, Brace, Jovanovich; Esquire Magazine; New England Monthly; Life Magazine; and Time, Inc.

His book Great Fortune: The Epic of Rockefeller Center (Viking, 2003) was a finalist for the Pulitzer Prize for History.

In October 2003, Okrent was named the first public editor for The New York Times, following the Jayson Blair scandal of falsified reporting. He held this position until May 2005.

Okrent and Peter Gethers, having acquired the theatrical rights to the site and name of the web series Old Jews Telling Jokes, co-wrote and co-produced a revue of that name. It opened at the Westside Theatre in Manhattan on May 20, 2012.

From 2003 to 2008, Okrent served as chairman of the Smithsonian's National Portrait Gallery. He has been awarded honorary degrees by the University of Michigan and the Massachusetts College of Liberal Arts.

Since 2017, Okrent has been listed on the advisory board of the Secular Coalition for America.

=== The Death of Print? ===
In the late 1990s, as editor of new media at Time Inc., Okrent wrote about the future of magazine publishing. He believed that the advancement of digital technologies would make it easier for people to read newspapers, magazines and books online. In late 1999, Okrent made a prediction about the future of print media in the Hearst New Media Lecture at the Graduate School of Journalism of Columbia University.

He told his audience:

I believe they, and all forms of print, are dead. Finished. Over. Perhaps not in my professional lifetime, but certainly in that of the youngest people in this room. Remove the question mark from the title of this talk. The Death of Print, full stop.

=== Okrent's law ===
During an interview after being appointed as the first public news editor of The New York Times, Okrent said, "The pursuit of balance can create imbalance because sometimes something is true." In what has become known as "Okrent's law", he was referring to the phenomenon of the press providing legitimacy to unsupported fringe viewpoints in an effort to appear even-handed.

== Baseball ==
Okrent invented Rotisserie League Baseball, the best-known form of fantasy baseball, in 1979. The name comes from the fact that he proposed the idea to his friends while dining at La Rôtisserie Française restaurant on New York City's East 52nd Street. Okrent's team in the Rotisserie League was called the "Okrent Fenokees", a pun on the Okefenokee Swamp. He was one of the first two people inducted into the Fantasy Sports Hall of Fame. Okrent was still playing Rotisserie as of 2009 under the team name Dan Druffs. Despite having been credited with inventing fantasy baseball he has never been able to win a Rotisserie League. His exploits of inventing Rotisserie League Baseball were chronicled in Silly Little Game, part of the ESPN 30 for 30 documentary series, in 2010.

Okrent is also credited with inventing the baseball stat, WHIP. At the time he referred to it as IPRAT, signifying "Innings Pitched Ratio".

In May 1981, Okrent wrote and Sports Illustrated published "He Does It by the Numbers". This profile of the then-unknown Bill James launched James's career as baseball's foremost analyst.

In 1994, Okrent was filmed for his in-depth knowledge of baseball history for the Ken Burns documentary Baseball. During the nine-part series, a red-sweater-wearing Okrent delivered a detailed analysis of the cultural aspects of the national pastime, including a comparison of the dramatic Game 6 of the 1975 World Series between the Boston Red Sox and Cincinnati Reds to the conflict and character development in Russian novels.

== Personal life ==
Okrent has participated in LearnedLeague under the name "OkrentD". He is the uncle of the linguist Arika Okrent.

== Bibliography ==
- The Ultimate Baseball Book (co-editor, with Harris Lewine) (1979)
- Nine Innings: The Anatomy of Baseball as Seen Through the Playing of a Single Game (1985)
- Baseball Anecdotes (co-author, with Steve Wulf) (1987)
- The Way We Were: New England Then, New England Now (1988)
- Great Fortune: The Epic of Rockefeller Center (2003)
- Public Editor #1 (2006)
- Last Call: The Rise and Fall of Prohibition (2010)
- The Guarded Gate: Bigotry, Eugenics, and the Law That Kept Two Generations of Jews, Italians, and Other European Immigrants Out of America (2019)
- Stephen Sondheim: Art Isn’t Easy (2026)

== Filmography ==
- Baseball (1994), (2010) | Documentary | Directed by: Ken Burns
- Sweet And Lowdown (1999) | Role of: A.J. Pickman | Comedy-Drama | Directed by: Woody Allen
- Wordplay (2006) | Documentary | Directed by: Patrick Creadon
- The Hoax (2007) | Role of: Real Publisher #1 | Comedy-Drama | Directed by: Lasse Hallström
- Silly Little Game (2010) | Documentary | Directed by: Lucas Jansen and Adam Kurland
- Prohibition (2011) | Documentary | Directed by: Ken Burns and Lynn Novick.

== See also ==
- List of people from Detroit
- List of people from New York City
- List of University of Michigan alumni

Media offices
| New title | Public Editor for The New York Times; 2003–2005 | Succeeded by Byron Calame |
