= Adrian Nicole LeBlanc =

American journalist

Adrian LeBlanc
- Education: Smith College; Oxford University; Yale University.
- Writing career
- Genre: Journalism
- Notable awards: Holtzbrinck Fellow; MacArthur Fellowship

Adrian Nicole LeBlanc is an American journalist whose works focus on the marginalized members of society: adolescents living in poverty, prostitutes, women in prison, etc. She is best known for her 2003 non-fiction book Random Family. She was a recipient of the MacArthur Fellowship—popularly known as the "Genius Grant"—in 2006.

== Early life and education ==
LeBlanc grew up in a working-class family in Leominster, Massachusetts. She studied at Smith College, University of Oxford, and Yale University. She worked for Seventeen as an editor after earning her master's degree in modern literature at Oxford.

== Random Family ==
LeBlanc's first book, Random Family: Love, Drugs, Trouble, and Coming of Age in the Bronx, took more than 10 years to research and write. Random Family is a nonfiction account of the struggles of two women and their family as they deal with love, drug dealers, babies and prison time in the Bronx. LeBlanc and Random Family garnered several awards and nominations. Her research methods earned her a spot among several other journalists and nonfiction writers in Robert Boynton's book, New New Journalism.

== Career ==
=== Journalism ===
LeBlanc has contributed to The New York Times Magazine, The Village Voice, The New Yorker and Esquire. She currently lives in Manhattan.

=== Academic ===
Adrian Nicole LeBlanc was a Holtzbrinck Fellow at the American Academy in Berlin, Germany, for Spring 2009. She is a visiting scholar at the Arthur L. Carter Journalism Institute at New York University 2009–2010. She was part of the Harman Writer-in-Residence Program at Baruch College in Spring 2011.

== Publications ==
- "Gang Girl: When Manny's Locked-Up" (August, 1994)
- "Landing from the Sky", The New Yorker, April 23, 2000)
- "When the Man of the House Is in the Big House" Cover, January, 2003)
- Random Family: Love, Drugs, Trouble, and Coming of Age in the Bronx. Simon and Schuster. 2003. ISBN 978-1-4391-2489-5.
- "Sidelines" (About the work of Swiss artist Uwe Wittwer, in Geblendet / Dazzled: Kehrer, Heidelberg, 2005)
- "'The Ground We Lived On': A Father's Last Days" (documenting the last months of her father's life, on NPR's All Things Considered, 2006)

== Awards ==
- Margolis Award (2000)
- Lettre Ulysses Award (2003)
- New York Times Best Books of the Year (2003)
- Borders Original Voices Award for Nonfiction
- MacArthur Fellow (2006)
