= Random Family =

2003 Non-fiction Book by Adrian Nicole LeBlanc

- Paperback edition
- Author: Adrian Nicole LeBlanc
- Language: English
- Genre: Non-fiction
- Publication date: 2003
- Publication place: United States

Random Family: Love, Drugs, Trouble, and Coming of Age in the Bronx is a 2003 narrative non-fiction study of urban life by American writer Adrian Nicole LeBlanc.

== Summary ==
The book, LeBlanc's first, took more than 10 years to research and write. Set in the Bronx's Tremont neighborhood during the crack epidemic and the War on Drugs, the book follows the lives of a family — Jessica, her brother Cesar, their mother Lourdes, and Cesar’s girlfriend Coco — from the mid-1980s into the early 2000s, as its members contend with teenage pregnancy, poverty, crime and incarceration.

LeBlanc began the long period of research after reporting in Newsday about the trial of "a hugely successful heroin dealer" named George 'Boy George' Rivera. Through the figure of his girlfriend, Jessica, LeBlanc excavated the lives of an extended, struggling Puerto Rican family in the South Bronx during a tumultuous period in New York's history.

== Reception ==
In The New York Times, critic Janet Maslin described LeBlanc's work as "a book that exerts the fascination of a classic, unflinching documentary." Mark Kramer, director of the Nieman Foundation Program on Narrative Journalism at Harvard University, praised the book's "relentless neutrality." In The New York Times Book Review, Margaret Talbot wrote, "The conventional compliment to pay a work of narrative nonfiction is to say that it's 'novelistic' or that it 'reads like fiction.' You could certainly say that of 'Random Family,' and yet there are tasks a writer like LeBlanc must accomplish that are different, and in some ways more difficult, than a novelist's. For one thing, she must remain cleareyed about people to whom she owes a tremendous debt of gratitude for admitting her into the intimacies of their lives. And for another, she must hew to a plotline that is often stuttering and circular and decidedly lacking in resolution. None of the people she writes about veer definitively toward a newer or better life — they tend toward the same tired grooves — yet she makes their stories riveting"; Talbot called LeBlanc's work, "An extraordinary book." The novel is #25 on The New York Times' 100 Best Books of the 21st Century list.

== Awards and honors ==
LeBlanc and Random Family garnered several awards and nominations. Her research methods earned her a spot among several other journalists and nonfiction writers in Robert Boynton's book, The New New Journalism. In 2006, LeBlanc received a MacArthur Fellowship, more popularly known as a "Genius Grant".
