= Great Fortune: The Epic of Rockefeller Center =

2003 book by Daniel Okrent

- Paperback edition cover
- Author: Daniel Okrent
- Language: English
- Subject: Rockefeller Center
- Genre: Non-fiction
- Set in: Manhattan
- Publisher: Viking Press
- Publication date: September 29, 2003
- Publication place: United States
- Media type: Print, e-book
- Pages: 544
- ISBN: 978-0670031696
- OCLC: 58392831

Great Fortune: The Epic of Rockefeller Center is a non-fiction book by American writer Daniel Okrent about the conception, planning, and building of Rockefeller Center in Manhattan, New York City. The text was initially published on September 29, 2003 by Viking. In this book, Daniel Okrent provides a detailed story of Rockefeller Center creation—from conception to construction—and the role that John D. Rockefeller Jr. and his associates played in those events. The text also explores such themes as big-time business, art, architecture, politics, and social life, and how they interact.

== Awards ==
In 2004, the book was the Pulitzer Prize for History finalist.

== Reception ==
Adam Cohen of The New York Times commented "Okrent has a good time with the most storied parts of Rockefeller Center lore.... A greater flaw is the book's failure to situate Rockefeller Center in a larger historical context, or to extract deeper meaning. It would be interesting to get more of Okrent's thoughts about the project's impact on the development of New York City". A reviewer of Publishers Weekly stated "Just as Okrent's Nine Innings beautifully telescoped all of baseball into a single game in 1982 between the Milwaukee Brewers and the Baltimore Orioles, so the former Life editor and Time Inc. executive finds in the creation of Rockefeller Center a good deal of New York and many of the contradictions in American life as the country worked to emerge from the Depression".
