= Public editor =

Person who supervises implementation of journalism ethics at news organization

A public editor is a position existing at some news publications; the person holding this position is responsible for supervising the implementation of proper journalism ethics within that publication. These responsibilities include identifying and examining critical errors or omissions, and acting as a liaison with the public. Most commonly, public editors perform this work through a regular feature on a newspaper's editorial page. Because public editors are generally employees of the very newspaper they're criticizing, it may appear as though there is a possibility of bias. However, a newspaper with a high standard of ethics would not fire a public editor for a criticism of the paper; the act would contradict the purpose of the position and would itself be a very likely cause for public concern.

Many major newspapers in the U.S. use the public editor column as the voice for their ombudsman, though this is not always the case. Public editor columns cover a broader scope of issues and do not have an accreditation process, while in order to qualify as an ombudsman of any standing one must be a member of the Organisation of News Ombudsmen.

The first newspaper to appoint an ombudsman was Tokyo's Asahi Shimbun in 1922; the first American newspapers to appoint a public editor were the Louisville Courier-Journal and the Louisville Times in 1967.

At The New York Times, the position was created in response to the Jayson Blair scandal. The Times' first public editor was Daniel Okrent, whose background was primarily in book publishing; Okrent held the position from December 2003 through May 2005. Over the next twelve years, five persons in succession held the position, but then on May 31, 2017, the Times announced that it was eliminating the public editor position.
