= Newark Eagles all-time roster =

The following is the list of players on the Newark Eagles all-time roster. These are Newark Eagles players who appeared in at least one game for the Eagles, or for the teams that merged to form the Eagles, the Newark Dodgers and Brooklyn Eagles, from 1933 to 1951.

On-going research continuously discovers unreported or misreported games (and the affected players), while some games and players may be lost forever. Therefore, some Negro league players' affiliations will likely remain incomplete and possibly disputed.

‡ Bold player inducted as a member of the National Baseball Hall of Fame and Museum.

== A–D ==
Player	Year(s)	Position(s)	Ref
Spencer Alexander	1940–1941	OF	
Bill Anderson	1947	P	
Red Applegate	1947	P	
Paul Arnold	1934–1935	OF	
Earl Ashby	1948	C	
Russell Awkard	1940–1941	OF	
Alonza Bailey	1934–1935	P	
Otha Bailey	1950–1951	C	
Norman Banks	1945	3B	
Marvin Barker	1935, 1941	OF	
Vic Barnett	1944	OF	
Giovanni Beale	1947	1B / P	
John Beckwith	1934	1B	
William Bell	1935–1937	P	
Charles Beverly	1936	P	
Charlie Biot	1932	OF	
Jimmy Boyd	1946	P	
Archie Brathwaite	1944	OF	
George Britt	1934	P / 3B	
Ameal Brooks	1947	C	
James Brown	1939–1943	OF	
Jesse Brown	1938	P	
Ulysses Brown	1937–1939	C	
Buddy Burbage	1934	OF	
Tex Burnett	1935–1937	C / 1B	
Willie Burns	1935, 1942	P	
Ed Butler	1943	SS	
Jim Carter	1948	P	
Spoon Carter	1940	P	
Mickey Casey	1938	C	
Goldie Cephus	1934	—	
Thad Christopher	1936, 1941, 1945	OF	
Ray Clark	1934–1935	P	
Buster Clarkson	1940, 1942	SS	
Cecil Cole	1946	P	
Anthony Cooper	1935	2B	
Darltie Cooper	1940	P	
James Cox	1947	P	
Harry Cozart	1939, 1944	P	
Homer Craig	1934–1935	P	
Hubert Crawford	1936	SS	
Jimmie Crutchfield	1937–1938	OF	
Ray Dandridge‡	1934–1938, 1942, 1944	3B / 2B	
Pepper Daniels	1935	C	
Austin Davis	1943	3B / SS	
Earl Davis	1934	2B	
Johnny Davis	1940–1950	OF	
Rosey Davis	1938	P	
Leon Day‡	1935–1939, 1941–1943, 1946	P	
Jo Jo Deal	1948	OF	
Russ Dedeaux	1941	P	
Paul Dixon	1936	OF	
Rap Dixon	1935	OF	
Larry Doby‡	1942–1944, 1946–1947	2B	
Lucius Dorsey	1942	OF	

== E–L ==
Player	Year(s)	Position(s)	Ref
Joe Echols	1939	OF	
Weedy Edwards	1947	P	
Jim Elam	1943	P	
Charles England	1946	P	
Bob Evans	1934–1939	P	
Jimmy Everett	1936, 1940	P	
Benny Felder	1936	SS	
Toots Ferrell	1947	P	
John Fitzgerald	1943, 1947	OF / C	
Percy Forrest	1944	P	
Jonas Gaines	1937	P	
Walter Lee Gibbons	1948	—	
Dennis Gilchrist	1935	2B	
George Giles	1935	1B	
Oscar Givens	1939, 1946, 1948	SS	
Clyde Golden	1948	P	
Honey Green	1938	P / OF	
Clarence Griffin	1935	OF	
Wiley Griggs	1950–1951		
Nap Gulley	1947	P	
Vernon Harrison	1939	P	
Bob Harvey	1943–1951	OF	
Bun Hayes	1935	P	
Johnny Hayes	1934–1939	C	
Jay Heard	1949–1951		
Jimmy Hill	1938–1945	P	
Fred Hobgood	1941–1944	P	
Crush Holloway	1935	OF	
Johnny Holmes	1942	OF	
Leniel Hooker	1940–1948	P	
Emmett Hopkins	1945	P	
Carl Howard	1935	—	
Willie Hubert	1939	P	
Charlie Humber	1945	2B	
Cal Irvin	1946	SS	
Monte Irvin‡	1938–1943, 1945–1948	OF / SS	
Clarence Isreal	1940–1942, 1946	3B	
Bill Jackman	1935–1936	P	
Ed Jacobs	1944	P	
Charlie Jemison	1935	P	
Fats Jenkins	1935	OF	
Bert Johnson	1934–1935	OF	
Bucky Johnson	1939	2B	
Johnny A. Johnson	1938	P	
Leamon Johnson	1941, 1944	SS / 2B	
Percy Lacey	1935	P	
Raymon Lacy	1948–1950		
Wilbur Lansing	1948	P	
Rufus Lewis	1946–1950	P	
Leonard Lindsay	1935	1B	
Mo Lisby	1934	P	
Dick Lundy	1934–1935, 1937	SS	

== M–R ==
Player	Year(s)	Position(s)	Ref
Biz Mackey‡	1939–1941, 1945–1947	C	
William Makell	1944	C	
Max Manning	1938–1942, 1946–1949	P	
Ziggy Marcell	1948	C	
Duke Markham	1935–1936	OF	
Fran Matthews	1938, 1940–1942, 1945	1B	
Tuts McBride	1941	OF	
Frank McCoy	1934–1935	C	
Terris McDuffie	1935–1938, 1944–1945	P	
Jack McLaurin	1948	C	
Lefty Mellix	1934	P	
Schute Merritt	1934	2B	
Flash Miller	1934–1935	2B / SS	
Purnell Mincy	1940	P	
James Moore	1936–1937	1B	
Barney Morris	1936	P	
Sy Morton	1944	SS	
Lefty Nelson	1938	—	
Don Newcombe	1944–1945	P	
Billy Nicholas	1935–1936	P	
Willie Nixon	1940	OF	
Roosevelt Owens	1934, 1937	P	
Ted Page	1936	OF	
Clarence Palm	1935	C	
Charlie Parks	1940–1942, 1944, 1946–1947	C	
Pat Patterson	1946–1947	3B	
Warren Peace	1945–1947	P	
Lennie Pearson	1937–1948	1B / OF	
Javier Pérez	1935	3B	
Rafael Polanco	1941	OF	
Andrew Porter	1947	P	
Marvin Price	1950–1951		
Busta Quintana	1934	2B	
Ted Radcliffe	1935	P	
Jimmy Reese	1935	P	
Earl Richardson	1943	SS	
Vernon Riddick	1939, 1941	SS / 3B	
Specs Roberts	1945	P	
Ray Robinson	1938	P	
Leon Ruffin	1935–1936, 1939, 1942–1944, 1946	C	

== S–Z ==
Player	Year(s)	Position(s)	Ref
Bubby Sadler	1935	SS	
Dick Seay	1937–1940	2B	
Jim Smith	1943	C	
Willie Smith	1938	3B / P	
Fred Spearman	1936	3B	
Joe Spencer	1943	2B	
Larry St. Thomas	1943	C	
Jim Starks	1934–1935	1B	
Otis Starks	1935	P	
Leon Stewart	1936, 1940	P	
Ed Stone	1935–1940, 1942–1943	OF	
Mule Suttles‡	1936–1939, 1941–1944	1B / OF	
Schoolboy Johnny Taylor	1940	P	
Clint Thomas	1936	OF	
Nelson Thomas	1947	P	
Charlie Thomason	1941–1942	OF	
Ted Toles Jr.	1947		
Bob Turner	1944	OF	
Slim Vaughan	1934	P	
Albert Walker	1940	P	
Bo Wallace	1948–1949	C	
Willie Ward	1935	OF	
Joe Ware	1935	1B	
Johnny Washington	1950		
Skeeter Watkins	1942–1946	3B / SS	
Dick Weaver	1944	—	
Willie Wells‡	1936–1939, 1942, 1945	SS	
Arthur White	1934	P	
Eugene White	1935	3B	
Carl Whitney	1942	OF	
Jimmy Wilkes	1945–1950	OF	
Sidney Williams	1945	P	
Elbert Williams	1935	P	
Harry Williams	1935–1936	2B	
Jim Williams	1935	OF	
Leroy Williams	1947–1948	2B / SS	
Cotton Williams	1943–1951	P	
Roy Williams	1935	P	
Willie Williams	1945, 1947–1951	SS	
Wilmore Williams	1943	OF	
Bob Wilson	1947–1948	3B	
Fred Wilson	1939	OF	
Johnny Wright	1937–1939, 1945	P	
Willie Wynn	1944–1945, 1947–1948	C	
Bill Yancey	1935	SS	
Tom Young	1941	C	
