= 1946 Negro World Series =

Team (Wins)	Manager(s)
Newark Eagles (4)	Biz Mackey
Kansas City Monarchs (3)	Frank Duncan
- Dates: September 17–29
- Venue(s): New York: Polo Grounds (1); Newark: Ruppert Stadium (2,6,7); Kansas City: Blues Stadium (3,4); Chicago: Comiskey Park (5)
- Hall of Famers: Newark: Leon Day, Larry Doby, Monte Irvin, Biz Mackey (mgr.); Kansas City: Willard Brown, Satchel Paige, Hilton Smith

In the 1946 Negro World Series, the Newark Eagles, champions of the Negro National League, beat the Kansas City Monarchs, champions of the Negro American League, four games to three.

== Summary ==
Newark won the series, 4–3.

Game	Date	Score	Location	Time	Attendance
1	September 17	Kansas City Monarchs – 2, Newark Eagles – 1	Polo Grounds	3:08	19,423
2	September 19	Kansas City Monarchs – 4, Newark Eagles – 7	Ruppert Stadium	2:26	9,787
3	September 23	Newark Eagles – 5, Kansas City Monarchs – 15	Blues Stadium	2:35	8,492
4	September 24	Newark Eagles – 8, Kansas City Monarchs – 1	Blues Stadium	2:00	3,836
5	September 25	Newark Eagles – 1, Kansas City Monarchs – 5	Comiskey Park	2:20	4,000
6	September 27	Kansas City Monarchs – 7, Newark Eagles – 9	Ruppert Stadium	—	—
7	September 29	Kansas City Monarchs – 2, Newark Eagles – 3	Ruppert Stadium	—	7,500

== Matchups ==
=== Game 1 ===
Tuesday, September 17, 1946 at Polo Grounds, New York, New York
Team	1	2	3	4	5	6	7	8	9	R	H	E
Kansas City	1	0	0	0	0	0	1	0	0	2	8	0
Newark	0	0	0	0	0	1	0	0	0	1	9	1
WP: Satchel Paige (1–0) LP: Rufus Lewis (0–1); Boxscore

Game 1 matched Hilton Smith for Kansas City and Leon Day for Newark, but each would not factor in the final decision, while each team lost a player due to injury. Newark third baseman Clarence Isreal was lost for the game in the third inning due to dislocating his knee while running into the stands for a foul ball (he was replaced by Benny Felder). Monarch shortstop Jim Hamilton was lost in the fifth inning due to suffering a compound fracture in his right leg on a play at the plate (he would be replaced by Chico Renfroe).

Kansas City started the proceedings with the first run in the opening inning with Hank Thompson hitting a leadoff single. However, right fielder Bob Harvey would commit an error on the play, and Thompson advanced all the way to third base. Herb Souell would follow him with a single to right that scored Thompson. A single by the next batter was followed by a double play and a subsequent out to quell the threat for more.

The Monarchs blew a key chance in the fourth inning for runs. The bases were loaded on two walks and a single and one out, but Hilton Smith and Hank Thompson committed outs to end the threat. Newark had their own blown chance in the fifth inning, when they had two baserunners on with one out, but Jimmy Wilkes and Benny Felder both committed outs to keep the game at 1–0. Smith was replaced after the fifth inning, having allowed five hits while walking two batters and striking out four. Day would follow in being replaced in the fifth, having allowed four hits while walking four and striking out six. In for Smith was Satchel Paige while in for Day was Rufus Lewis, with each proving to allow four hits in four innings, but Paige proved the most effective, as he allowed no runs to score while striking out eight. Newark broke through in the sixth inning. Second baseman Larry Doby was walked by Smith (who in turned was replaced by Paige). Doby stole second base, but Monte Irvin and Lennie Pearson struck out. With two outs, Johnny Davis hit a single to right that tied the game.

Kansas City responded in the seventh inning, starting on a single by Paige that got him to second base when Doby committed an error. With two outs, Souell hit a single to left that scored Paige and gave them a 2–1 lead. The Eagles would hit a single in each of the last three innings but fail to send a runner home, with Cotton Williams striking out to end the game.

=== Game 2 ===
Thursday, September 19, 1946 at Ruppert Stadium in Newark, New Jersey
Team	1	2	3	4	5	6	7	8	9	R	H	E
Kansas City	0	0	0	1	3	0	0	0	0	4	6	2
Newark	0	0	1	0	0	0	6	0	0	7	12	2
WP: Max Manning (1–0) LP: Satchel Paige (1–1); Home runs: KC: Willard Brown (1); NWK: Larry Doby (1); Boxscore

This was the first time since Game 3 of the 1942 Negro World Series that each team hit a home run, and it saw Kansas City blow a 4–1 lead in the seventh inning. Acting as starter was Ford Smith for Kansas City while Max Manning started for Newark. The Eagles started the scoring when Larry Doby drew a two-out walk. Monte Irvin lined a double that scored Doby. Kansas City equaled the game in the fifth inning, starting with a leadoff single by Buck O'Neil, who advanced to second base on an error by center fielder Jimmy Wilkes. After a batter struck out, Chico Renfroe lined a single to right field that scored O'Neil.

Kansas City cracked open the game in the sixth inning. Herb Souell hit a leadoff single, and Ted Strong laid a successful bunt that ended up getting him to first base when Manning committed an error. Willard Brown proceeded to hit a home run that made the score 4–1. However, Newark responded the next inning. Wilkes started by lining a leadoff single. After a strikeout, Doby stepped to the plate with one out. He hit a home run that made the score 4–3. After a walk to Irvin, Smith was replaced by Paige for his second straight relief appearance. Lennie Pearson lined a single to left that scored Irvin and tied the game, and an error by left fielder Johnie Scott got him to second base. A single by Johnny Davis scored Pearson to break the tie. A strikeout meant that Leon Ruffin stepped to the plate with two out. He responded with a single that scored Davis, and the throw by right fielder Strong rolled through third baseman Souell's legs, which meant that Ruffin advanced to third on the play. Manning, up to bat, singled to right to score the sixth and final run of the inning to make a 7–4 lead.

Kansas City had one last chance in the ninth inning, when Renfroe hit a one-out single and H. Smith drew a walk that put two baserunners on with one out. However, Paige hit the ball to second baseman Doby, who threw to Pearson for a double play that ended the game. Manning pitched a complete game in allowing four runs on six hits with three walks and eight strikeouts for Newark. For Kansas City, Smith allowed four runs to score on eight hits on 6 1/3 innings while walking five and striking out twice, while Paige pitched 1 2/3 innings and allowed three runs on four hits with one strikeout.

=== Game 3 ===
Monday, September 23, 1946 at Blues Stadium in Kansas City, Missouri
Team	1	2	3	4	5	6	7	8	9	R	H	E
Newark	0	2	0	0	1	0	2	0	0	5	7	3
Kansas City	1	4	0	1	1	1	0	7	X	15	21	1
WP: Jim LaMarque (1–0) LP: Leniel Hooker (0–1); Home runs: NWK: None; KC: Ted Strong (1); Boxscore

Leniel Hooker of the Eagles was matched against Jim LaMarque of the Monarchs. Kansas City started the scoring in the first inning, with one-out singles by Herb Souell and Hank Thompson resulting in runners on the corner. Catcher Leon Ruffin would allow a passed ball that resulted in a run when Souell advanced to home. Newark responded in the second inning. Monte Irvin and Lennie Pearson hit singles; two outs followed, but the runners advanced to third and second base. Ruffin made up for his error by lining a single that scored both runners and gave them the lead. When Kansas City came to bat in the bottom half of the inning, they responded in kind. Buck O'Neil hit a leadoff single and then stole second base. This was followed by a walk to Johnie Scott and a force-out that meant runners were on first and second with one out. LaMarque would hit a single that scored Scott, and Chico Renfroe followed him with a single that loaded the bases. One batter later, Thompson would line a two-out single that scored three runs after shortstop Irvin committed an error, with the result being that the score was 5–2 in favor of Kansas City. The Monarchs piled on the runs by scoring a run in each of the next three innings. Hooker was pulled after four innings of work, having allowed six runs on nine hits while walking a batter. He was pulled for Cotton Williams, who pitched the next three innings. Newark would cut into the lead in the seventh, starting with a walk to Pat Patterson and a single by Larry Doby. A force-out and a sacrifice out resulted in two runs scoring.

The eighth inning proved to be undoing for the Eagles, who saw a three run deficit turn into a ten run blowout. It started with four straight singles, which resulted in two runs, while an out by Brown scored another run. Ted Strong would hit a one-out home run that made it 13–5. It was followed by an out and then a combination of three singles and a walk that resulted in two runs. Williams was pulled at last after it was 15–5, having allowed nine runs to score in his 3 2/3 innings of work (doing so on 11 hits), replaced by Max Manning. He drew a hit and a groundout to end the inning. Larry Doby ended the game on an out in the ninth inning that gave Kansas City a 2–1 series lead. LaMarque pitched a complete game while allowing five runs on seven hits with three walks and eight strikeouts.

=== Game 4 ===
Tuesday, September 24, 1946 at Blues Stadium in Kansas City, Missouri
Team	1	2	3	4	5	6	7	8	9	R	H	E
Newark	0	0	2	0	2	3	1	0	0	8	14	0
Kansas City	0	1	0	0	0	0	0	0	0	1	4	3
WP: Rufus Lewis (1–1) LP: Ted Alexander (0–1); Home runs: NWK: Monte Irvin (1); KC: None; Boxscore

Game 4 matched Rufus Lewis for the Eagles against Ted Alexander of the Monarchs.

Kansas City scored the first run of the game in the second inning on the strength of a leadoff single by Willard Brown, who advanced to second on a stolen base and then went to third and home on outs made (the latter on a fly to center by Buck O'Neil). Ultimately, Kansas City would score just one run in the game, having just four hits while only having one in the first three innings each and in the sixth inning. Newark responded in the next inning. Jimmy Wilkes hit a one-out single, which was followed by Pat Patterson advancing on an error. One batter (and out) later, Monte Irvin hit a two-out single that would score Wilkes and then score Patterson after catcher Earl Taborn committed an error.

In the fifth, Newark cemented their lead on the strength of four hits (Wilkes, Larry Doby, Irvin, and Lennie Pearson) and an error committed by Kansas City that resulted in two runs while Alexander was replaced by Satchel Paige (however, it did not stop Doby when he attempted to steal home plate from third base, which succeeded). The runs continued in the next inning, starting on a one-out walk to Ruffin that was followed by a Rufus Lewis single and a Wilkes double that scored a run before Doby hit a triple that cleared the bases (he also committed the last out when trying to stretch the triple into an inside-the-park home run). Irvin scored the final run of the game in the seventh inning on a leadoff home run to right field.

Lewis threw a complete game while allowing one run on four hits with six strikeouts. Alexander allowed four runs to score on six hits while going 4 2/3 innings and walking two with one strikeout. Paige pitched the remaining 4 1/3 innings while allowing four runs to score on eight hits with three strikeouts and one walk.

=== Game 5 ===
Wednesday, September 25, 1946 at Comiskey Park in Chicago, Illinois
Team	1	2	3	4	5	6	7	8	9	R	H	E
Newark	0	0	0	0	0	0	0	1	0	1	10	0
Kansas City	0	0	0	1	0	2	2	0	X	5	9	0
WP: Hilton Smith (1–0) LP: Max Manning (1–1); Boxscore

Game 5 matched Max Manning against Hilton Smith, and each pitcher went the distance, the first of just two games in the Series where the bullpen wasn't needed for each team. Manning went eight innings but allowed five runs to score on nine hits with three walks and seven strikeouts, while Smith went nine innings and allowed just one run on ten hits with a walk and three strikeouts.

Both teams had roughly the same amount of hits and baserunners left on, but Kansas City made more out of their opportunities to win (Newark for example left two baserunners in each of the first three innings). It started in the fourth inning, as Hank Thompson drew a leadoff walk. He made his way to second base after a pop-out and a strikeout, and Johnie Scott got him to third with a single. Ford Smith, playing at right field in the seven-hole spot, would hit a single to center that scored Thompson.

In the sixth, Kansas City added on to the lead. Thompson hit a leadoff double and then advanced to third on a ground out. Buck O'Neil then hit a sacrifice bunt that scored Thompson. Scott then hit a triple to left, which was followed by an intentional walk to Smith with two out. However, Manning would throw a wild pitch that allowed Scott to race home from third to make it 3–0. In the next inning, Hilton Smith and Chico Renfroe each would hit a single. Two batters later, Willard Brown hit a two-out double to right that scored the runners and made it 5–0. Newark scored their only run of the game when Lennie Pearson hit a one-out double to score Monte Irvin from first base.

=== Game 6 ===
Friday, September 27, 1946 at Ruppert Stadium in Newark, New Jersey
Team	1	2	3	4	5	6	7	8	9	R	H	E
Kansas City	5	0	0	0	0	0	2	0	0	7	11	2
Newark	4	2	0	2	0	1	0	0	X	9	10	3
WP: Leniel Hooker (1–1) LP: Steve Wylie (0–1); Home runs: KCM: Willard Brown (2), Buck O'Neil (1); NWK: Monte Irvin 2 (3) Lennie Pearson (1); Boxscore

Game 6 matched Leon Day against Jim LaMarque, but in a unique circumstance, neither pitcher would commit a single out for their teams, as each team exploded in offense in the first inning, while Monte Irvin became the first and only player to hit two home runs in a Negro World Series game.

In the top of the first inning, Day allowed two singles and an error that set up Willard Brown at the plate. Brown hit a home run to left field that made it 4–0, and Day was replaced on the mound by Leniel Hooker (Day stayed in the game, moving to center field). Hooker allowed the first two runners to reach before a single by Earl Taborn drove the fifth run in to score. In the bottom half of the frame, LaMarque issued walks to Hooker, Clarence Isreal, and Larry Doby, loading the bases. He was pulled for Steve Wylie. A force-out on Irvin generated one out, but a single by Lennie Pearson scored two runs. A wild pitch by Wylie narrowed the score to 5–3. An intentional walk put runners on the corner with two out, and Leon Ruffin responded with a single to make it 5–4. Newark took the lead in the second inning, doing so on the strength of a walk issued to Hooker, who was driven home three batters later on a home run to left field by Irvin to make it 6–5. They added on to their lead in the fourth inning, when Pearson hit a one-out home run to left field after Irvin had hit a single. Kansas City responded in the next frame when W. Brown hit a leadoff single and Buck O'Neil hit a home run that made it 8–7. The next run proved to be the last one, and it was scored by Irvin on a home run to right field in the sixth inning, and O'Neil committed the final out in the ninth inning as the Eagles proved victorious.

Wylie had pitched 3 1/3 innings in relief and allowed five runs to score on eight hits while walking two and striking out two before being taken out for Ted Alexander (who had pitched the closing 4 2/3 innings of one-run ball). Hooker had pitched nine innings in relief while allowing three runs on eight hits with one walk and three strikeouts.

=== Game 7 ===
Sunday, September 29, 1946 at Ruppert Stadium in Newark, New Jersey
Team	1	2	3	4	5	6	7	8	9	R	H	E
Kansas City	0	0	0	0	0	1	1	0	0	2	8	2
Newark	1	0	0	0	0	2	0	0	X	3	3	1
WP: Rufus Lewis (2–1) LP: Ford Smith (0–1); Home runs: KCM: Buck O'Neil (2); NWK: None; Boxscore

The final game matched Rufus Lewis of Newark (the Game 4 winner) versus Ford Smith (making his second start after doing Game 2).

Newark never trailed during the first Game 7 of the Negro World Series since 1943. With one out, Pat Patterson reached first base when second baseman Hank Thompson committed an error. Larry Doby drew a walk to have two batters on with one out. Monte Irvin then hit a single to right that scored Patterson and gave the Eagles a 1–0 lead at the end of the first inning.

Kansas City had left a base runner each of the first five innings but came up with nothing. In the sixth inning, however, Buck O'Neil hit a home run to left field that tied the game. The Eagles responded in the bottom half of the frame, starting when Doby and Irvin both reached base on walks. With two outs, Johnny Davis hit a double to left that scored both runners on base and made the score 3–1. Kansas City inched closer in the seventh inning; Joe Greene reached on a single and stole second base before Ford Smith hit a single to put runners on the corner. Herb Souell hit a two-out single to narrow the score to 3–2, but Hank Thompson committed an out to close the inning.

In the closing inning, Kansas City reached base twice with a single by Smith and a walk to Chico Renfroe (which occurred after a critical single by Taborn failed because he tried to make it to second base and was called out). With two outs, Souell popped out to first baseman Lennie Pearson to end the game and give Newark the championship. Ford Smith pitched eight innings and allowed three runs on three hits with seven walks and two strikeouts for the Monarchs. For Newark, Rufus Lewis pitched nine innings and allowed two runs on eight hits with four walks and eight strikeouts.

== See also ==
- 1946 World Series
