= Benny Felder =

American baseball player

- Shortstop
- Born: December 9, 1926; Tampa, Florida, U.S.
- Died: October 2, 2009 (aged 82); Tampa, Florida, U.S.
- Batted: Right Threw: Right

Negro league baseball debut
- 1946, for the Newark Eagles

Last appearance
- 1951, for the Philadelphia Stars
- Stats at Baseball Reference

Teams
- Newark Eagles (1946–1947); Indianapolis Clowns (1948); Philadelphia Stars (1951)

William Benjamin Felder (December 9, 1926 – October 2, 2009) was an American Negro league baseball shortstop who played for the 1946 Negro World Series champion Newark Eagles.

A native of Tampa, Florida, Felder was a strong-fielding but light-hitting infielder. He broke into the Negro leagues in 1946 for Newark, and took the field on opening day for Baseball Hall of Famer Leon Day's no-hitter against the Philadelphia Stars. Felder split shortstop duties that season with Hall of Famer Monte Irvin, and saw action in the club's Negro World Series victory over the Kansas City Monarchs.

Felder went on to play in the minor leagues for the Key West Conchs in 1952, the Pampa Oilers in 1953, and split time with Pampa and the Artesia NuMexers in 1954. He died in Tampa in 2009 at age 82.
