= Oscar Givens =

American baseball player

- Infielder
- Born: July 5, 1922; Elizabeth, New Jersey, U.S.
- Died: October 22, 1967 (aged 45); Lyons, New Jersey, U.S.
- Batted: Right Threw: Right

Negro league baseball debut
- 1946, for the Newark Eagles

Last appearance
- 1948, for the Newark Eagles
- Stats at Baseball Reference

Teams
- Newark Eagles (1946, 1948)

Oscar Cornelius Givens (July 5, 1922 – October 22, 1967), nicknamed "Gibby", was an American Negro league infielder in the 1940s.

A native of Elizabeth, New Jersey, Givens attended Linden High School and Morgan State College. He played for the Newark Eagles during their 1946 Negro World Series championship season, and played for the club again in 1948. Givens died in Lyons, New Jersey in 1967 at age 45.
