= Ford Smith =

American baseball player (1919–1983)

- Pitcher / Outfielder
- Born: January 9, 1919; Phoenix, Arizona, U.S.
- Died: February 26, 1983 (aged 64); Phoenix, Arizona, U.S.
- Batted: Both Threw: Right

Negro league baseball debut
- 1939, for the Chicago American Giants

Last appearance
- 1948, for the Kansas City Monarchs

Teams
- Chicago American Giants (1939); Indianapolis Crawfords (1940); Kansas City Monarchs (1941, 1946–1948)

Career highlights and awards
- Negro American League ERA leader (1948)

John Ford Smith (January 9, 1919 – February 26, 1983) was an American professional baseball pitcher and outfielder in the Negro leagues in the 1930s and 1940s.

A native of Phoenix, Arizona, Smith attended the University of Arizona. He broke into the Negro leagues in 1939 with the Chicago American Giants, and played with the Indianapolis Crawfords in 1940 and the Kansas City Monarchs in 1941. He served in the United States Army Air Corps during World War II, and after his service returned to play with Kansas City from 1946 to 1948. He started Game 2 and Game 7 of the 1946 Negro World Series for the Monarchs, and was selected to play in the East–West All-Star Game in 1947.

Smith and Baseball Hall of Famer Monte Irvin signed with the New York Giants on the same day in 1949, and Smith spent the next several years playing in the minor leagues. In 1949 and 1950, he played for the Jersey City Giants, in 1951 for the Drummondville Cubs, 1952 and 1953 for the Phoenix Senators, and 1954 for the El Paso Texans.

After his baseball career, he returned to Phoenix, where he worked for the Phoenix Union High School District, and served as executive director of the Arizona Civil Rights Commission. He died in Phoenix in 1983 at age 64.
