= Norman Banks =

Norman Banks may refer to:

- Norman Banks (baseball), Negro league baseball player
- Norman Banks (broadcaster) (1905–1985), radio broadcaster of Australian rules football
- Norman Banks (bishop) (born 1954), Anglican bishop of Richborough
