= Ted Strong =

American baseball player (1914–1978)

- Outfielder / Shortstop / First baseman / Player-manager
- Born: January 2, 1914; South Bend, Indiana, U.S.
- Died: March 1, 1978 (aged 64); Chicago, Illinois, U.S.
- Batted: Both Threw: Right

Negro leagues debut
- 1937, for the Indianapolis Athletics

Last Negro leagues appearance
- 1951, for the Chicago American Giants

Negro leagues statistics
- Batting average: .323
- Hits: 252
- Home runs: 22
- Runs batted in: 167
- Stolen bases: 28
- Stats at Baseball Reference

Teams
- Baseball: Chicago American Giants (1936-1937); Indianapolis Athletics (1937); Kansas City Monarchs (1937, 1938–39, 1941–42, 1946–47); Indianapolis ABCs (1938); Indianapolis Clowns (1948); Basketball: Harlem Globetrotters (1935–42, 1946–49); Chicago Studebaker Flyers (1942–43)

Career highlights and awards
- Negro World Series champion (1942); 7× All-Star (1937, 1938, 1939 (1), 1939², 1941, 1942 (1), 1942²); 5× Negro American League pennant (1937, 1939, 1941, 1942, 1946); 2× Negro American League batting champion (1942, 1946); Triple Crown (1942)

Theodore Reginald Strong Jr. (January 2, 1914 – March 1, 1978), was an American professional baseball outfielder, shortstop, first baseman, and player-manager who played from 1936 to 1942 and again from 1946 to 1951 for the Chicago American Giants, Indianapolis Athletics, Kansas City Monarchs, Indianapolis ABCs, and Indianapolis Clowns.

== Playing career ==
=== Baseball ===
Strong started his professional baseball career in 1937. He played 26 games that year, primarily for the Indianapolis Athletics, although he was later shifted to the Kansas City Monarchs and Chicago American Giants. He batted .320 while being named to his first East-West All-Star Game. He contributed to the Monarchs winning the NAL pennant that year. In the Championship Series held against the Chicago American Giants, he batted .400 in four games while driving in three runs as the Monarchs won the pennant. In 1938, he made another All-Star team while batting .389 in twenty games spent mostly in Indianapolis. After he was traded to Kansas City late in the year, he stayed with the team for nearly the rest of his career. In 1939, he played 46 games while batting .314 and leading the Negro American League in walks (22) and runs batted in (fourteen); he was named to both East-West games that year. He batted .263 in the Championship Series against the St. Louis Stars in 1939. He took a year off before returning in 1941. That year, he had a slashline of .327/.468/.602 (with the latter two leading the league) while playing in thirty games; he led the league in walks (26) and home runs (six) while receiving an East-West selection. In 1942, he led the Negro American League in batting average (.364), home runs (six), and runs batted in (32) to achieve the batting Triple Crown, an achievement only done by six other players in Negro league history. He and Lennie Pearson both achieved the mark in 1942 and thus were the last players to do so in league history. He also led the league in hits (48) and runs (31). In the 1942 Negro World Series that year, he played in four games and batted .333 while hitting a home run and driving in four runs to help beat the Homestead Grays.

Strong's career was interrupted while he served in World War II from 1943 to 1945, as a Seabee in the Marshall Islands. He was honorably discharged in January 1946. In 1946, he returned to play 34 games with the Monarchs. He batted a league-leading .364 while leading the league in runs (30), and home runs (three). In the 1946 Negro World Series against the Newark Eagles, he batted .133 in four games with two RBI in the series loss. 1947 was his last year with the Monarchs. He played in 37 games and batted .210. He closed his major league career with the Indianapolis Clowns in 1948, batted .389 in twelve games.

=== Basketball ===
Strong also played basketball for the original Harlem Globetrotters from 1935 to 1942 and from 1946 to 1949, during the baseball off-season. In 1942, he also briefly played for the Chicago Studebaker Flyers of the National Basketball League, along with other Globetrotters, as one of the first black players in the league.
