= Charles England =

American baseball player

- Pitcher
- Born: September 6, 1921; Newton, North Carolina, U.S.
- Died: January 23, 1999 (aged 77); Salisbury, North Carolina, U.S.

Negro league baseball debut
- 1946, for the Newark Eagles

Last appearance
- 1946, for the Newark Eagles
- Stats at Baseball Reference

Teams
- Newark Eagles (1946)

Charles Macon England (September 6, 1921 – January 23, 1999) was an American Negro league pitcher in the 1940s.

A native of Newton, North Carolina, England played for the Newark Eagles during their 1946 Negro World Series championship season. England died in Salisbury, North Carolina in 1999 at age 77.
