= Warren Peace (baseball) =

American baseball player

- Pitcher
- Born: August 6, 1921; Kittrell, North Carolina, U.S.
- Died: November 3, 2002 (aged 81); Chester, Pennsylvania, U.S.
- Batted: Right Threw: Right

Negro league baseball debut
- 1945, for the Newark Eagles

Last appearance
- 1947, for the Newark Eagles

Teams
- Newark Eagles (1945–1947)

William Warren Peace (August 6, 1921 – November 3, 2002) was an American Negro league baseball pitcher for the Newark Eagles between 1945 and 1947.

A native of Kittrell, North Carolina, Peace pitched for Newark's 1946 Negro World Series champion club. He died in Chester, Pennsylvania, in 2002 at age 81.
