= Charles McBride =

Charles or Charlie McBride may refer to:

- Charles McBride (sculptor), Scottish sculptor
- Tuts McBride (Charles Henry McBride), American baseball player
- Charlie McBride (rugby league), New Zealand rugby league footballer
- Charlie McBride (American football coach)
- Charlie McBride, played one NFL game in 1936
