= Homer Craig =

American baseball player

- Pitcher

Negro league baseball debut
- 1934, for the Newark Dodgers

Last appearance
- 1935, for the Newark Dodgers
- Stats at Baseball Reference

Teams
- Newark Dodgers (1934–1935)

Homer Craig is an American former Negro league pitcher who played in the 1930s.

Craig played for the Newark Dodgers in 1934 and 1935. In 16 recorded games, he posted six hits in 26 plate appearances with a 5.91 ERA in 77.2 innings on the mound.
