= Clyde Golden =

American baseball player (1928–2017)

- Pitcher
- Born: December 30, 1928; Jacksonville, Florida, U.S.
- Died: January 20, 2017 (aged 88); Jacksonville, Florida, U.S.
- Threw: Left

Negro league baseball debut
- 1948, for the Newark Eagles

Last appearance
- 1948, for the Newark Eagles
- Stats at Baseball Reference

Teams
- Newark Eagles (1948)

Clyde Sherman Golden (December 30, 1928 – January 20, 2017) was an American professional baseball pitcher in the Negro leagues.

A native of Jacksonville, Florida, Golden played for the Newark Eagles in 1948. He died in Jacksonville on January 20, 2017, at the age of 88.
