= Jim Smith (catcher) =

- Catcher
- Batted: Unknown Threw: Unknown

Negro league baseball debut
- 1943, for the Newark Eagles

Last appearance
- 1943, for the Newark Eagles

Teams
- Newark Eagles (1943)

James Smith was an American professional baseball catcher in the Negro leagues. He played with the Newark Eagles in 1943.
