= Vernon Riddick =

American baseball player

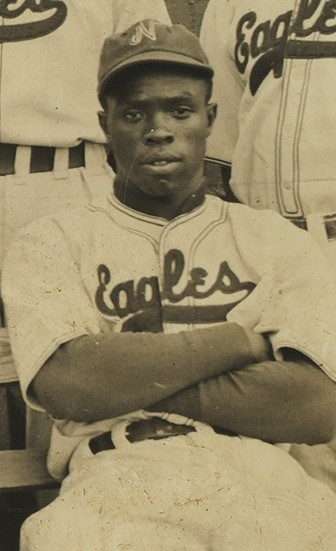
- Infielder
- Born: January 1, 1917; Elizabeth City, North Carolina, U.S.
- Died: March 12, 1979 (aged 62); Norfolk, Virginia, U.S.
- Batted: Right Threw: Right

Negro league baseball debut
- 1939, for the Newark Eagles

Last appearance
- 1941, for the Newark Eagles

Teams
- Newark Eagles (1939, 1941)

Vernon Walter Riddick (January 1, 1917 – March 12, 1979), nicknamed "Big Six", was an American Negro league infielder.

A native of Elizabeth City, North Carolina, Riddick made his Negro leagues debut in 1939 with the Newark Eagles, and played again for Newark in 1941. He died in Norfolk, Virginia in 1979 at age 62.
