= Bo Wallace (baseball) =

American baseball player (1929-2000)

- Catcher
- Born: April 7, 1929; Elizabeth, New Jersey, U.S.
- Died: April 14, 2000 (aged 71); Elizabeth, New Jersey, U.S.
- Batted: Unknown Threw: Right

Negro league baseball debut
- 1948, for the Newark Eagles

Last appearance
- 1949, for the Houston Eagles

Teams
- Newark/Houston Eagles (1948-1949)

James Alfred Wallace (April 7, 1929 – April 14, 2000) was an American professional baseball catcher in the Negro leagues. He played with the Newark/Houston Eagles in 1948 and 1949. In 1950, he split time between the Ottawa Nationals of the Border League and the Bridgeport Bees in the Colonial League.

Wallace served in the United States Armed Forces during the Korean War and lost part of his left hand in a grenade explosion, ending his baseball career.
