= Johnny Washington (pitcher) =

American baseball player and Purple Heart/Silver Star recipient

- Pitcher / First baseman / Outfield
- Born: April 20, 1930 (age 96); Chicago, Illinois, U.S.

Negro leagues debut
- 1948, for the Houston Eagles

Last appearance
- 1950, for the Houston Eagles
- Stats at Baseball Reference

Teams
- Houston Eagles (1948, 1950); Chicago American Giants (1949)

Career highlights and awards
- Marine Corps Championship (1952)

Johnny B. Washington (born April 20, 1930) played for the Chicago American Giants and the Houston Eagles in baseball's Negro league.

Washington was born in Chicago and attended that city's Morgan Park High School, graduating in 1949.

In 1951 Washington joined the U.S. Marine Corps, serving in Korea. He played on the Marine's national championship baseball team in 1952.
