= Rafael Polanco =

Puerto Rican baseball player (born 1913)

- Left fielder
- Born: June 24, 1913; San Juan, Puerto Rico
- Died: Unknown; Unknown
- Batted: Unknown Threw: Unknown

Negro league baseball debut
- 1941, for the Newark Eagles

Last appearance
- 1941, for the Newark Eagles

Teams
- Newark Eagles (1941)

Rafael Polanco Cruz (June 24, 1913 – death date unknown) was a Puerto Rican baseball left fielder in the Negro leagues. He played with the Newark Eagles in 1941. Some sources list him playing for the Philadelphia Stars in 1942.
