= Vernon Harrison (baseball) =

American baseball player (1919–1978)

- Pitcher
- Born: July 13, 1919; Portsmouth, Virginia, U.S.
- Died: March 18, 1978 (aged 58); Jersey City, New Jersey, U.S.
- Batted: Unknown Threw: Left

Negro league baseball debut
- 1939, for the Newark Eagles

Last appearance
- 1939, for the Newark Eagles
- Stats at Baseball Reference

Teams
- Newark Eagles (1939)

Vernon Randolph "Lefty" Harrison (July 13, 1919 – March 18, 1978) was an American professional baseball pitcher in the Negro leagues. He played with the Newark Eagles in 1939.
