= Dick Weaver =

- Pinch hitter
- Batted: Unknown Threw: Unknown

Negro league baseball debut
- 1944, for the Newark Eagles

Last appearance
- 1944, for the Newark Eagles

Teams
- Newark Eagles (1944)

Dick Weaver was an American professional baseball player in the Negro leagues. He played with the Newark Eagles in 1944.
