= Fred Hobgood =

American baseball player

- Pitcher
- Born: October 1, 1921; Kinston, North Carolina, U.S.
- Died: September 23, 1965 (aged 43); Kinston, North Carolina, U.S.
- Batted: Left Threw: Left

Negro league baseball debut
- 1941, for the Newark Eagles

Last appearance
- 1946, for the Philadelphia Stars
- Stats at Baseball Reference

Teams
- Newark Eagles (1941–1944, 1946); Philadelphia Stars (1944)

Frederick Douglass Hobgood (October 1, 1921 – September 23, 1965) was an American Negro league baseball pitcher in the 1940s.

A native of Kinston, North Carolina, Hobgood made his Negro leagues debut in 1941 for the Newark Eagles. He played for Newark through 1944 and again in 1946, and also played briefly for the Philadelphia Stars in 1944. Hobgood died in Kinston in 1965 at age 43.
