= Jim Elam =

American baseball player

- Pitcher
- Born: June 6, 1920; Midlothian, Virginia, U.S.
- Died: February 4, 1961 (aged 40); Richmond, Virginia, U.S.
- Batted: Unknown Threw: Unknown

Negro league baseball debut
- 1943, for the Newark Eagles

Last appearance
- 1943, for the Newark Eagles
- Stats at Baseball Reference

Teams
- Newark Eagles (1943)

James Thomas Elam (June 6, 1920 – February 4, 1961) was an American professional baseball pitcher in the Negro leagues.

A native of Midlothian, Virginia, Elam played with the Newark Eagles in 1943. He served in the US Army during World War II, and died in Richmond, Virginia in 1961 at age 40.
