= Roosevelt Owens =

- Pitcher
- Born: December 22, 1910; Atlanta, Georgia, U.S.
- Batted: Unknown Threw: Unknown

Negro league baseball debut
- 1934, for the Newark Dodgers

Last appearance
- 1937, for the Newark Eagles

Teams
- Newark Dodgers/Eagles (1934, 1937); Baltimore Black Sox (1934); Brooklyn Royal Giants (1937)

Roosevelt Henry Owens (born December 22, 1910 - death date unknown) was an American professional baseball pitcher in the Negro leagues. He played with Newark Dodgers/Eagles in 1934 and 1937, the Baltimore Black Sox in 1934, and the Brooklyn Royal Giants in 1937.
