= Nelson Thomas =

- Pitcher
- Batted: Unknown Threw: Unknown

Negro league baseball debut
- 1947, for the Newark Eagles

Last appearance
- 1947, for the Newark Eagles

Teams
- Newark Eagles (1947)

Nelson Thomas was an American professional baseball pitcher in the Negro leagues. He played with the Newark Eagles in 1947.
