= Austin Davis (infielder) =

American baseball player (1922–2000)

- Third baseman, Shortstop, Second baseman
- Born: July 15, 1922; Aiken, South Carolina
- Died: December 4, 2000 (aged 78); St. Petersburg, Florida
- Batted: Right Threw: Right

Negro league baseball debut
- 1943, for the Newark Eagles

Last appearance
- 1946, for the New York Black Yankees
- Stats at Baseball Reference

Teams
- Newark Eagles (1943); New York Black Yankees (1946)

Austin Francoy Davis Jr. (July 15, 1922 – December 4, 2000) was an American former Negro league infielder who played in the 1940s.

Davis played for the Newark Eagles in 1943. In 11 recorded games, he posted four hits in 39 plate appearances while playing third base and shortstop. He appeared in one game at second base for the New York Black Yankees in 1946.
