= Albert Walker (baseball) =

American baseball player

- Pitcher
- Batted: Unknown Threw: Unknown

Negro league baseball debut
- 1940, for the Newark Eagles

Last appearance
- 1940, for the Newark Eagles

Teams
- Newark Eagles (1940)

Albert Walker was an American professional baseball pitcher in the Negro leagues. He played with the Newark Eagles in 1940.
