= Harry Cozart =

American baseball player

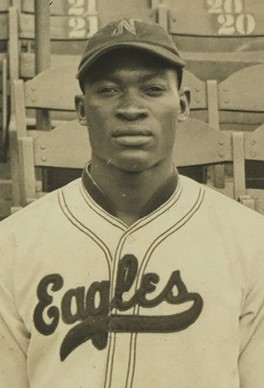
- Pitcher
- Born: April 17, 1917; Raleigh, North Carolina, U.S.
- Died: May 21, 1989 (aged 72); Detroit, Michigan, U.S.
- Batted: Right Threw: Right

Negro league baseball debut
- 1939, for the Newark Eagles

Last appearance
- 1944, for the Newark Eagles
- Stats at Baseball Reference

Teams
- Newark Eagles (1939, 1944)

Haywood Cozart (April 17, 1917 – May 21, 1989), nicknamed "Big Train", was an American Negro league pitcher.

A native of Raleigh, North Carolina, Cozart made his Negro leagues debut in 1939 with the Newark Eagles, and played again for Newark in 1944. He died in Detroit, Michigan in 1989 at age 72.
