= Bob Turner (baseball) =

American baseball player

- Center fielder
- Born: September 15, 1926; Franklin, New Jersey, U.S.
- Died: April 23, 1962 (aged 35)
- Batted: Right Threw: Right

Negro league baseball debut
- 1944, for the Newark Eagles

Last appearance
- 1946, for the Kansas City Monarchs

Teams
- Newark Eagles (1944); Kansas City Monarchs (1946)

Robert Lewis Turner (September 15, 1926 – April 23, 1962) was an American professional baseball center fielder in the Negro leagues. He played with the Newark Eagles in 1944 and the Kansas City Monarchs in 1946.
