= Jimmy Boyd (baseball) =

American baseball player

- Pitcher
- Born: March 31, 1918; Winnsboro, South Carolina, U.S.
- Died: October 14, 1965 (aged 47); Columbia, South Carolina, U.S.
- Batted: Unknown Threw: Unknown

Negro league baseball debut
- 1946, for the Newark Eagles

Last appearance
- 1946, for the Newark Eagles
- Stats at Baseball Reference

Teams
- Newark Eagles (1946)

James Edward Boyd (March 31, 1918 – October 14, 1965) was an American professional baseball pitcher in the Negro leagues. He played with the Newark Eagles in 1946.
