= Rufus Lewis =

American baseball player(1919–1999)

- Pitcher
- Born: December 13, 1919; Hattiesburg, Mississippi, U.S.
- Died: December 17, 1999 (aged 80); Southfield, Michigan, U.S.
- Batted: Right Threw: Right

debut
- 1936, for the Pittsburgh Crawfords

Last appearance
- 1952, for the Dorados de Chihuahua

Teams
- Pittsburgh Crawfords (1936–1938); Newark Eagles (1946–1948); Navegantes del Magallanes (1946–1947 [winter]); Habana BBC (1947–1948 [winter]); Diablos Rojos del México (1950–1951; 1952); Azules de Veracruz (1951); Dorados de Chihuahua (1952)

Career highlights and awards
- All-Star (1948); Negro League World Series champion (1946); Negro National League ERA leader (1946)

Rufus Lewis (December 13, 1919 – December 17, 1999) was an American professional baseball pitcher who played in Negro league baseball, as well as in Cuban, Mexican and Venezuelan professional leagues affiliated to organized baseball.

Lewis pitched in three games for the Eagles in the 1946 Negro World Series, pitching in relief in Game 1 for teammate Hilton Smith before getting starts in Game 4 and Game 7; Lewis went 2-1, including wins in both starts as Newark won their only championship; Lewis pitched a complete game while allowing eight hits with two runs while walking four and striking out eight batters.

A native of Hattiesburg, Mississippi, Lewis served in the United States Army Air Forces during World War II. He died in Southfield, Michigan in 1999 at age 80.
