= Willie Ward =

American baseball player

- Center fielder
- Born: November 3, 1909; Atlantic City, New Jersey, U.S.
- Died: February 1987; Atlantic City, New Jersey, U.S.
- Batted: Unknown Threw: Unknown

Negro league baseball debut
- 1932, for the Bacharach Giants

Last appearance
- 1945, for the Philadelphia Stars

Teams
- Bacharach Giants (1932); Brooklyn Eagles (1935); Philadelphia Stars (1935)

William Addison Ward (November 3, 1909 – February 1987) was an American professional baseball center fielder in the Negro leagues. He played with the Bacharach Giants in 1932 and the Brooklyn Eagles and Philadelphia Stars in 1935.
