= Schute Merritt =

American baseball player

- Second baseman
- Born: 1910 or 1911; Easton, Pennsylvania, U.S.
- Died: May 14, 1988; Easton, Pennsylvania, U.S.
- Batted: Right Threw: Right

Negro league baseball debut
- 1934, for the Newark Dodgers

Last appearance
- 1934, for the Newark Dodgers
- Stats at Baseball Reference

Teams
- Newark Dodgers (1934)

William E. Merritt (1910 or 1911 – May 14, 1988), nicknamed "Schute" or "Chute", was an American Negro league second baseman in the 1930s.

A native of Easton, Pennsylvania, Merritt graduated from Easton Area High School in 1930. He played for the Newark Dodgers in 1934, and served in the US Navy during World War II. Merritt died in his hometown of Easton in 1988 at age 77.
