= Spencer Alexander =

American baseball player

- Left fielder
- Born: September 4, 1916; Gastonia, North Carolina, U.S.
- Died: November 29, 1987 (aged 71); Bessemer City, North Carolina, U.S.
- Batted: Left Threw: Right

Negro league baseball debut
- 1940, for the Newark Eagles

Last appearance
- 1941, for the Newark Eagles
- Stats at Baseball Reference

Teams
- Newark Eagles (1940-1941)

Spencer Alexander (September 4, 1916 – November 29, 1987) was an American professional baseball left fielder in the Negro leagues. He played with the Newark Eagles in 1940 and 1941.
