= Honey Green =

American baseball player (1915–1989)

Alfred Gerardis "Honey" Green
- Left fielder / Pitcher
- Batted: Right Threw: Right

Negro league baseball debut
- 1938, for the Newark Eagles

Last appearance
- 1938, for the Newark Eagles
- Stats at Baseball Reference

Teams
- Newark Eagles (1938)

Honey Green (September 23, 1915 – January 29, 1989) was an American professional baseball left fielder and pitcher in the Negro leagues. He played with the Newark Eagles in 1938.

Green was born Alfred Geradis Green in Cambridge, Massachusetts, on September 23, 1915. He died in Barnstable, Massachusetts, on January 29, 1989, at the age of 73.
