= Jim Carter (baseball) =

American baseball player

- Pitcher
- Born: December 10, 1928; Lawrenceville, New Jersey, U.S.
- Died: October 12, 2000 (aged 71); Princeton, New Jersey, U.S.
- Batted: Right Threw: Right

Negro league baseball debut
- 1948, for the Newark Eagles

Last appearance
- 1948, for the Newark Eagles
- Stats at Baseball Reference

Teams
- Newark Eagles (1948)

James Azah Carter (December 10, 1928 – October 12, 2000), also listed as Bill Carter, was an American professional baseball pitcher in the Negro leagues. He played with the Newark Eagles in 1948.
