= Jo Jo Deal =

American baseball player

- Left fielder
- Born: March 1, 1925; West Palm Beach, Florida, U.S.
- Died: July 27, 1970 (aged 45); Fort Lauderdale, Florida, U.S.
- Batted: Both Threw: Left

Negro league baseball debut
- 1948, for the Newark Eagles

Last appearance
- 1948, for the Newark Eagles
- Stats at Baseball Reference

Teams
- Newark Eagles (1948)

David Edward "Jo Jo" Deal (March 1, 1925 – July 27, 1970) was an American professional baseball left fielder in the Negro leagues. He played for the Newark Eagles in 1948.
