= Sidney Williams (baseball) =

- Pitcher
- Born: July 28, 1914; Louisville, Georgia, U.S.
- Died: January 8, 2006 (aged 91)
- Batted: Unknown Threw: Right

Negro league baseball debut
- 1945, for the Newark Eagles

Last appearance
- 1946, for the New York Black Yankees

Teams
- Newark Eagles (1945); New York Black Yankees (1946)

Sidney Linear Williams (July 28, 1914 – January 8, 2006) was an American professional baseball pitcher in the Negro leagues. He played with the Newark Eagles in 1945 and the New York Black Yankees in 1946.
