= Emmett Hopkins =

1945 American baseball pitcher

- Pitcher
- Batted: Unknown Threw: Unknown

Negro league baseball debut
- 1945, for the Newark Eagles

Last appearance
- 1945, for the Newark Eagles
- Stats at Baseball Reference

Teams
- Newark Eagles (1945)

Emmett Hopkins was an American professional baseball pitcher in the Negro leagues. He played with the Newark Eagles in 1945.
