= Clarence Griffin (baseball) =

American baseball player

- Outfielder
- Born: August 26, 1911; Banks County, Georgia, U.S.
- Died: February 27, 1991 (aged 79); Columbus, Ohio, U.S.
- Batted: Right Threw: Right

Negro league baseball debut
- 1933, for the Columbus Blue Birds

Last appearance
- 1935, for the Brooklyn Eagles
- Stats at Baseball Reference

Teams
- Columbus Blue Birds (1933); Cleveland Red Sox (1934); Brooklyn Eagles (1935)

Clarence Bernard Griffin (August 26, 1911 – February 27, 1991) was an American Negro league outfielder in the 1930s.

A native of Banks County, Georgia, Griffin made his Negro leagues debut in 1933 with the Columbus Blue Birds. He went on to play for the Cleveland Red Sox and Brooklyn Eagles. Griffin died in Columbus, Ohio in 1991 at age 79.
