= Larry St. Thomas =

American baseball player (1919-1992)

- Catcher
- Born: January 17, 1919; Dawson, Georgia, U.S.
- Died: April 20, 1992 (aged 73); New York City, New York, U.S.
- Batted: Right Threw: Right

Negro league baseball debut
- 1943, for the Newark Eagles

Last appearance
- 1947, for the New York Black Yankees

Teams
- Newark Eagles (1943); New York Black Yankees (1947)

Felman Larry St. Thomas (January 17, 1919 – April 20, 1992) was an American professional baseball catcher in the Negro leagues. He played with the Newark Eagles in 1943 and the New York Black Yankees in 1947.
