= Jimmy Hill (baseball) =

American baseball player (1918–1993)

- Born: June 6, 1918; Plant City, Florida
- Died: May 31, 1993 (aged 74); Sarasota, Florida

debut
- 1938, for the Newark Eagles

Last appearance
- 1945, for the Newark Eagles
- Stats at Baseball Reference

Jimmy Hill (June 6, 1918 - May 31, 1993) was an American Negro league baseball player who played for the Newark Eagles of the Negro National League from 1938 to 1945.
