= Willie Williams (baseball) =

American baseball player

- Infielder
- Born: May 25, 1925; Orangeburg, South Carolina or Holly Hill, South Carolina, U.S.
- Died: August 23, 2011 (aged 86); Sarasota, Florida, U.S.

Negro leagues debut
- 1948, for the Newark Eagles

Last appearance
- 1948, for the Newark Eagles

Career statistics
- Batting average: .231
- Home runs: 0
- Runs batted in: 14

Teams
- Newark Eagles (1948)

Willie C. Williams (May 25, 1925 – August 23, 2011), nicknamed "Curley", was an American Negro league baseball infielder who played for the Newark Eagles, Houston Eagles, New Orleans Eagles and in the minor leagues in a career that spanned from 1945 to 1953.

Born in Orangeburg or Holly Hill, South Carolina, Williams began his career with the Newark Eagles franchise in 1945 and remained with it through 1951, even as the team changed locations - it became the Houston Eagles in 1949 and then the New Orleans Eagles in 1951.

He began his minor league career in 1951, signing with the Chicago White Sox and playing for the Colorado Springs Sky Sox, with whom he hit .297 with four home runs in 20 games. He split 1952 in the White Sox and St. Louis Browns system, hitting .256 in 102 games. In 1953, he suited up for the Carman Cardinals of the independent Mandak League.

On August 23, 2011, he died at the age of 86 in Sarasota, Florida.
