= Giovanni Beale =

American baseball player

- Pitcher
- Born: June 15, 1922; Suffolk, Virginia, U.S.
- Died: July 9, 1970 (aged 48)
- Batted: Unknown Threw: Left

Negro league baseball debut
- 1947, for the Newark Eagles

Last appearance
- 1947, for the Newark Eagles

Teams
- Newark Eagles (1947)

Giovanni Valiant "Lefty" Beale (June 15, 1922 – July 9, 1970) was an American professional baseball pitcher in the Negro leagues. He played with the Newark Eagles in 1947.
