= Eugene White =

- Third baseman
- Batted: Unknown Threw: Unknown

Negro league baseball debut
- 1935, for the Brooklyn Eagles

Last appearance
- 1935, for the Brooklyn Eagles

Teams
- Brooklyn Eagles (1935)

Eugene White was an American professional baseball third baseman in the Negro leagues. He played with the Brooklyn Eagles in 1935.
