= Percy Lacey =

American baseball player

- Pitcher

Negro league baseball debut
- 1935, for the Newark Dodgers

Last appearance
- 1937, for the Philadelphia Stars

Teams
- Newark Dodgers (1935); Philadelphia Stars (1937)

Percy Lacey is an American former Negro league pitcher who played in the 1930s.

Lacey played for the Newark Dodgers in 1935 and for the Philadelphia Stars in 1937. In five recorded career appearances on the mound, he posted a 6.56 ERA over 23.1 innings.
