= Arthur White (baseball) =

American baseball player

- Pitcher

Negro league baseball debut
- 1934, for the Newark Dodgers

Last appearance
- 1936, for the Bacharach Giants

Teams
- Newark Dodgers (1934); Bacharach Giants (1936)

Arthur White is an American former Negro league pitcher who played in the 1930s.

White made his Negro leagues debut in 1934 with the Newark Dodgers. He went on to play for the Bacharach Giants in 1936.
