= Ed Butler (baseball) =

American baseball player

- Shortstop
- Batted: Unknown Threw: Unknown

Negro league baseball debut
- 1943, for the Newark Eagles

Last appearance
- 1945, for the Homestead Grays
- Stats at Baseball Reference

Teams
- Newark Eagles (1943); Homestead Grays (1945)

Edward Butler was an American professional baseball shortstop in the Negro leagues. He played with the Newark Eagles in 1943 and the Homestead Grays in 1945.
