= Percy Forrest =

- Pitcher
- Born: November 8, 1916; New Orleans, Louisiana, U.S.
- Died: May 9, 1994 (aged 77); New York, New York, U.S.
- Batted: Right Threw: Right

Negro league baseball debut
- 1938, for the Chicago American Giants

Last appearance
- 1946, for the New York Black Yankees
- Stats at Baseball Reference

Teams
- Chicago American Giants (1938-1939); New York Black Yankees (1943-1946); Newark Eagles (1944)

Percy Forrest (November 8, 1916 – May 9, 1994) was an American professional baseball pitcher in the Negro leagues. He played from 1938 to 1945 with the Chicago American Giants, New York Black Yankees and Newark Eagles.
