= Hubert Crawford =

- Infielder
- Born: February 13, 1910; Monroe, North Carolina, U.S.
- Died: September 9, 1983 (aged 73); Newark, New Jersey, U.S.
- Batted: Right Threw: Right

Negro league baseball debut
- 1932, for the Bacharach Giants

Last appearance
- 1936, for the Newark Eagles
- Stats at Baseball Reference

Teams
- Bacharach Giants (1932); Newark Eagles (1936)

Hubert Edwin Crawford (February 13, 1910 – September 9, 1983) was an American professional baseball infielder in the Negro leagues. He played with the Bacharach Giants in 1932 and the Newark Eagles in 1936.
