= Carl Howard (baseball) =

American baseball player

- Pitcher / Pinch runner
- Born: September 21, 1904; Simmons Creek, West Virginia, U.S.
- Died: February 12, 1980 (aged 75); Roanoke, Virginia, U.S.
- Batted: Right Threw: Right

Negro league baseball debut
- 1935, for the Brooklyn Eagles

Last appearance
- 1935, for the Brooklyn Eagles
- Stats at Baseball Reference

Teams
- Brooklyn Eagles (1935)

Carl Edgar "Sailor" Howard (September 21, 1904 – February 12, 1980) was an American professional baseball pitcher in the Negro leagues. He played with the Brooklyn Eagles in 1935.
