= Slim Vaughan =

American baseball player

- Pitcher
- Born: April 22, 1910; Richmond, Virginia, U.S.
- Died: July 3, 1992 (aged 82); Plainfield, New Jersey, U.S.
- Batted: Right Threw: Right

Negro league baseball debut
- 1934, for the Newark Dodgers

Last appearance
- 1934, for the Newark Dodgers
- Stats at Baseball Reference

Teams
- Newark Dodgers (1934)

Richard Edward "Slim" Vaughan (April 22, 1910 – July 3, 1992) was an American Negro league pitcher in the 1930s.

A native of Richmond, Virginia, Vaughan played for the Newark Dodgers in 1934. In nine recorded games on the mound, he posted a 7.49 ERA over 33.2 innings. Vaughan died in Plainfield, New Jersey in 1992 at age 82.
