= Lefty Mellix =

American baseball player

- Pitcher
- Born: April 29, 1896; Atlantic City, New Jersey, U.S.
- Died: March 23, 1985 (aged 88); Homewood, Pennsylvania, U.S.
- Batted: Left Threw: Left

Negro league baseball debut
- 1934, for the Newark Dodgers

Last appearance
- 1943, for the Homestead Grays

Teams
- Newark Dodgers (1934); Homestead Grays (1935, 1943)

Ralph Boley Mellix (April 29, 1896 – March 23, 1985), sometimes listed as "Felix", and nicknamed "Lefty", was an American Negro league baseball pitcher in the 1930s and 1940s.

A native of Atlantic City, New Jersey, Mellix attended Peabody High School in Pittsburgh, Pennsylvania. In 1934, he played for the Newark Dodgers, and in 1935 and 1943 he appeared for the Homestead Grays. Mellix died in Homewood, Pennsylvania in 1985 at age 88.
