= Russ Dedeaux =

American baseball player

- Pitcher
- Born: December 7, 1913; New Orleans, Louisiana, U.S.
- Died: January 2, 1956 (aged 42); Newark, New Jersey, U.S.
- Batted: Unknown Threw: Unknown

Negro league baseball debut
- 1941, for the Newark Eagles

Last appearance
- 1946, for the Los Angeles White Sox
- Stats at Baseball Reference

Teams
- Newark Eagles (1941); New York Black Yankees (1941); Los Angeles White Sox (1946)

Russell Louis Dedeaux (December 7, 1913 – January 2, 1956) was an American professional baseball pitcher in the Negro leagues. He played with the Newark Eagles and New York Black Yankees in 1941 and the Los Angeles White Sox in 1946. He was killed in a car accident in 1956.
