= John Fitzgerald (catcher) =

American baseball player

- Catcher
- Born: Unknown; Newark, New Jersey, U.S.
- Batted: Right Threw: Right

Negro league baseball debut
- 1943, for the Newark Eagles

Last appearance
- 1947, for the New York Black Yankees
- Stats at Baseball Reference

Teams
- Newark Eagles (1943, 1947); New York Black Yankees (1947)

John "Buster" Fitzgerald was an American professional baseball catcher in the Negro leagues. He played with the Newark Eagles in 1943 and 1947 and the New York Black Yankees in 1947.
