= Johnny Holmes =

- Left fielder
- Batted: Unknown Threw: Unknown

Negro league baseball debut
- 1942, for the Newark Eagles

Last appearance
- 1942, for the Newark Eagles
- Stats at Baseball Reference

Teams
- Newark Eagles (1942)

Johnny Holmes was an American professional baseball left fielder in the Negro leagues. He played with the Newark Eagles in 1942.
