= Duke Markham =

American baseball player

- Outfielder
- Born: December 14, 1906; Beech Springs, South Carolina, U.S.
- Died: January 29, 1939 (aged 32); Winston-Salem, North Carolina, U.S.
- Batted: Right Threw: Right

Negro league baseball debut
- 1935, for the Newark Dodgers

Last appearance
- 1936, for the Newark Eagles

Teams
- Newark Dodgers/Eagles (1935-1936)

Melvin "Duke" Markham, born Melvin Nesbit (December 14, 1906 – January 29, 1939), was an American professional baseball outfielder in the Negro leagues. He played with the Newark Dodgers/Eagles in 1935 and 1936. Markham was shot and killed in Winston-Salem, North Carolina in 1939.
