= Charlie Thomason =

- Outfielder
- Born: August 13, 1918; Heard County, Georgia, U.S.
- Died: May 2, 1998 (aged 79); Providence, Rhode Island, U.S.
- Batted: Right Threw: Right

Negro league baseball debut
- 1941, for the Newark Eagles

Last appearance
- 1942, for the Newark Eagles

Teams
- Newark Eagles (1941-1942)

Charles John Thomason (August 13, 1918 – May 2, 1998) was an American professional baseball outfielder in the Negro leagues. He played with the Newark Eagles in 1943 and 1942.
