= Lennie Pearson =

American baseball player

- First baseman
- Born: August 23, 1914; Akron, Ohio, U.S.
- Died: December 7, 1980 (aged 66); East Orange, New Jersey, U.S.
- Batted: Right Threw: Right

Negro leagues debut
- 1937, for the Newark Eagles

Last Negro leagues appearance
- 1948, for the Newark Eagles

Career statistics
- Batting average: .294
- Hits: 506
- Home runs: 50
- Runs batted in: 325
- Stolen bases: 42

Teams
- Newark Eagles (1937–1942, 1943, 1944–1948); Homestead Grays (1942, 1943); Philadelphia Stars (1943)

Career highlights and awards
- 6× All-Star (1941, 1942, 1943, 1945, 1946); Negro World Series champion (1946); Negro National League batting champion (1942); Triple Crown (1942)

Leonard Curtis Pearson (May 23, 1918 – December 7, 1980), nicknamed "Hoss", was an American professional baseball first baseman in the Negro leagues. He played from 1937 to 1949, playing mostly with the Newark Eagles.

Pearson started his Negro league career at the age of 19 with the Newark Eagles. He played 24 games in the 1937 season and batted .234. He played with the Eagles for all but six games of his 463-game career (with brief appearances for two teams). He batted over .300 for the first time in 1940, when he batted .347 with a Negro National League-leading eight home runs. He regressed the next year with .278 but made his first East-West All-Star Game. In 1942, he batted a league-leading .347 while leading in hits (67), home runs (11), and runs batted in (56); he was named to both All-Star games held that year. Only six other players in Negro league baseball history had achieved a batting Triple Crown, and it was Pearson and Ted Strong of the Negro American League that year that were the last players to achieve a batting Triple Crown.

The following year, he batted just .271 but made another All-Star team. He made the All-Star team for the 1945 and 1946 seasons while batting .300 in each year (including leading the league in stolen bases with seventeen in 1946). He played his last major league season in 1948, batting .292.
