= Willie Smith (third baseman) =

- Third baseman / Pitcher
- Batted: Unknown Threw: Unknown

Negro league baseball debut
- 1938, for the Newark Eagles

Last appearance
- 1938, for the Newark Eagles

Teams
- Newark Eagles (1938)

Willie Smith was an American professional baseball third baseman and pitcher in the Negro leagues. He played with the Newark Eagles in 1938.
