= Leon Stewart (baseball) =

American baseball player (1915–1969)

- Pitcher / Outfielder
- Born: September 5, 1915; Norfolk, Virginia, U.S.
- Died: August 10, 1969 (aged 53); The Bronx, New York, U.S.
- Batted: Right Threw: Left

Negro National League debut
- 1936, for the Newark Eagles

Last Negro National League appearance
- 1942, for the Birmingham Black Barons

Teams
- Newark Eagles (1936, 1940); Birmingham Black Barons (1942)

Leon "Lefty" Stewart (September 5, 1915 – August 10, 1969) was an American professional baseball pitcher in the Negro leagues. He played with the Newark Eagles in 1936 and 1940. He later played with the Negro American League Birmingham Black Barons in 1942 as outfielder. Leon adopted the nickname "Lefty" because he batted right and pitched left
