= Earl Richardson (baseball) =

American baseball player

- Shortstop
- Born: November 22, 1924; Montclair, New Jersey, U.S.
- Died: April 9, 2003 (aged 78); Parsippany, New Jersey, U.S.
- Batted: Right Threw: Right

Negro league baseball debut
- 1943, for the Newark Eagles

Last appearance
- 1943, for the Newark Eagles

Teams
- Newark Eagles (1943)

Earl Allen Richardson (November 22, 1924 – April 9, 2003) was an American professional baseball shortstop in the Negro leagues.

A native of Montclair, New Jersey, Richardson attended Montclair High School. He played with the Newark Eagles as a teenager in 1943, and served in the US Navy during World War II. Richardson died in Parsippany, New Jersey in 2003 at age 78.
