= Wilmore Williams =

American baseball player

- Right fielder
- Born: June 16, 1918; Williamsburg, Virginia, U.S.
- Died: June 30, 2002 (aged 84); West Point, Virginia, U.S.
- Batted: Unknown Threw: Unknown

Negro league baseball debut
- 1943, for the Newark Eagles

Last appearance
- 1943, for the Newark Eagles

Teams
- Newark Eagles (1943)

Wilmore Williams (June 16, 1918 – June 30, 2002) was an American professional baseball right fielder in the Negro leagues.

A native of Williamsburg, Virginia, Williams played with the Newark Eagles in 1943. He served in the US Navy during World War II, and died in West Point, Virginia in 2002 at age 84.
