= Jimmy Wilkes =

American baseball player

- Outfielder
- Born: October 1, 1925; Philadelphia, Pennsylvania, United States
- Died: August 11, 2008 (aged 82); Brantford, Ontario, Canada
- Batted: Left Threw: Left

Negro leagues debut
- 1945, for the Newark Eagles

Last appearance
- 1948, for the Newark Eagles

Negro National League statistics
- Batting average: .239
- Home runs: 4
- Runs scored: 59
- Stats at Baseball Reference

Teams
- Newark Eagles (1945–1948)

Career highlights and awards
- Negro League World Series champion (1946); All-Star (1948)

James Eugene Wilkes (October 1, 1925 – August 11, 2008), nicknamed "Seabiscuit", was an American professional baseball outfielder. He played in Negro league baseball for the Newark Eagles from 1945 to 1948. He was a member of the 1946 Negro World Series championship team, and was an All-Star in 1948.

In 1949 and 1950, Wilkes played for the Houston Eagles of the Negro American League. He then played in Minor League Baseball from 1950 through 1952 in the Brooklyn Dodgers organization. After only appearing in nine minor-league games in 1952, he returned to the Negro American League with the Indianapolis Clowns that season.

Wilkes subsequently played with the Brantford Red Sox of Southern Ontario from 1953 through 1963. In five of those seasons, the Red Sox were champions of the Intercounty Baseball League. He is considered one of the top 100 players in league history. After retiring as a player, Wilkes served as an umpire in the league for 23 years.
