= Billy Nicholas =

- Pitcher
- Batted: Unknown Threw: Unknown

Negro league baseball debut
- 1935, for the Brooklyn Eagles

Last appearance
- 1936, for the Newark Eagles

Teams
- Brooklyn/Newark Eagles (1935-1936)

William Nicholas, also listed as William Nichols/Nicholson, was an American professional baseball pitcher in the Negro leagues. He played with the Brooklyn/Newark Eagles in 1935 and 1936.
