= Pat Patterson (infielder, born 1911) =

American baseball player

- Infielder
- Born: December 19, 1911; East Chicago, Indiana, U.S.
- Died: May 16, 1984 (aged 72); Houston, Texas, U.S.
- Batted: Both Threw: Right

Negro league baseball debut
- 1934, for the Cleveland Red Sox

Last appearance
- 1947, for the Newark Eagles

Teams
- Cleveland Red Sox (1934); Homestead Grays (1934); Pittsburgh Crawfords (1935); Kansas City Monarchs (1936); Pittsburgh Crawfords (1937); Philadelphia Stars (1938–1939, 1941–1942); Newark Eagles (1946–1947)

Andrew Lawrence Patterson (December 19, 1911 – May 16, 1984) was an American Negro league baseball infielder in the 1930s and 1940s.

A native of East Chicago, Indiana, Patterson attended Washington High School and Wiley College, where he starred in football and baseball. He broke into the Negro leagues in 1934 with the Cleveland Red Sox, and was selected to play in that season's East–West All-Star Game. After serving in the military in World War II, Patterson returned to baseball and played for the 1946 Negro World Series champion Newark Eagles.

Following his baseball career, Patterson was a high school teacher, coach, athletic director, and superintendent of schools in Houston, Texas. He died in Houston in 1984 at age 72.
