= Ray Clark (baseball) =

American baseball player

- Pitcher

Negro league baseball debut
- 1934, for the Newark Dodgers

Last appearance
- 1935, for the Newark Dodgers

Teams
- Newark Dodgers (1934–1935)

Ray Clark is an American former Negro league pitcher who played in the 1930s.

Clark played for the Newark Dodgers in 1934 and 1935. In five recorded appearances on the mound, he posted a 9.86 ERA over 21 innings.
