= Charlie Jemison =

American baseball player

- Pitcher
- Born: 1903; Walker County, Alabama, U.S.

Negro league baseball debut
- 1932, for the Homestead Grays

Last appearance
- 1935, for the Newark Dodgers

Teams
- Homestead Grays (1932, 1934); Newark Dodgers (1935)

Charles Heard Jemison (born 1903) was an American Negro league pitcher in the 1930s.

A native of Walker County, Alabama, Jemison made his Negro leagues debut in 1932 with the Homestead Grays. He played for the Homestead club again in 1934, and went on to play for the Newark Dodgers in 1935.
