= Ed Jacobs (baseball) =

- Pitcher
- Batted: Unknown Threw: Unknown

Negro league baseball debut
- 1944, for the Newark Eagles

Last appearance
- 1944, for the Newark Eagles
- Stats at Baseball Reference

Teams
- Newark Eagles (1944)

Edward "Red" Jacobs was an American professional baseball pitcher in the Negro leagues. He played with the Newark Eagles in 1944.
