= Leon Ruffin =

American baseball player

- Catcher
- Born: February 11, 1912; Portsmouth, Virginia, U.S.
- Died: August 14, 1970 (aged 58); Portsmouth, Virginia, U.S.
- Batted: Right Threw: Right

debut
- 1935, for the Brooklyn Eagles

Last appearance
- 1946, for the Newark Eagles

Negro National League statistics
- Batting average: .204
- Home runs: 3
- Runs scored: 52

Teams
- Brooklyn Eagles (1935); Newark Eagles (1936, 1939, 1942–1944, 1946); Pittsburgh Crawfords (1937–1938); Philadelphia Stars (1939–1940)

Career highlights and awards
- All-Star (1946); Negro League World Series champion (1946)

Charles Leon Ruffin (February 11, 1912 – August 14, 1970) was an American catcher in Negro league baseball. He played for the Brooklyn Eagles, Newark Eagles, Pittsburgh Crawfords, and Philadelphia Stars between 1935 and 1946.

A native of Portsmouth, Virginia, Ruffin served in the US Navy during World War II. He died in Portsmouth in 1970 at age 58.
