= Leon Day =

American baseball player (1916–1995)

- Pitcher / Center fielder / Second baseman
- Born: October 30, 1916; Alexandria, Virginia, U.S.
- Died: March 13, 1995 (aged 78); Baltimore, Maryland, U.S.
- Batted: Right Threw: Right

Negro leagues debut
- 1934, for the Baltimore Black Sox

Last Negro leagues appearance
- 1950, for the Baltimore Elite Giants

Negro leagues (Note: On December 16, 2020, Major League Baseball declared certain Negro leagues, from the span of 1920–1948, to be "Major League". Day's statistics reflect his time in the Negro leagues from 1934 to 1946.) statistics
- Win–loss record: 50–22
- Earned run average: 3.58
- Strikeouts: 432
- Stats at Baseball Reference

Teams
- Baltimore Black Sox (1934); Brooklyn / Newark Eagles (1935–1939, 1941–1943, 1946); Baltimore Elite Giants (1949–1950)

Career highlights and awards
- 9× All-Star (1935, 1937, 1939, 1939², 1942, 1942², 1943, 1946, 1946²); Negro World Series champion (1946); Negro National League wins leader (1946); Negro National League strikeout leader (1942)

Member of the National

Baseball Hall of Fame
- Induction: 1995
- Election method: Veterans Committee

Leon Day (October 30, 1916 – March 13, 1995) was an American professional baseball pitcher, center fielder, and second baseman who spent the majority of his career in the Negro leagues. Recognized as one of the most versatile athletes in the league during his prime, Day could play every position except catcher. A right-handed pitcher with a trademark no wind-up delivery, Day excelled at striking batters out, especially with his high-speed fastball. At the same time, he was an above-average contact hitter, which, combined with his effectiveness as a baserunner and his tenacious fielding, helped cement Day as one of the most dynamic players of the era.

Debuting in the Negro leagues in 1934, Day played with the Baltimore Black Sox, Newark Eagles, and Baltimore Elite Giants during his career. In 1937, Day had the best season of his career as a member of the Eagles, finishing with a perfect record of 13–0 and a batting average over .300. Day also played Puerto Rican winter ball in the offseasons. He holds both the Negro and Puerto Rican league records for strikeouts in a game, and appeared in the most East–West All-Star Games.

Because of his soft-spoken demeanor, Day's accomplishments were not immediately recognized as opposed to other elite pitchers of the league like Satchel Paige. Nonetheless, Day is considered one of the best pitchers of the Negro leagues, equaling and sometimes surpassing the abilities of his contemporaries. In 1995, Day was elected into the Baseball Hall of Fame, just six days before his death at 78 years old.

== Early life ==
Day was born to glass factory worker Ellis Day and his wife Hattie Leet in Alexandria, Virginia, a city 7 miles (11 km) from Washington, D.C., on October 30, 1916. His family, which included five other siblings, moved the following year to Mount Winans, a predominantly black community in a poor area of Southwest Baltimore, in a residence situated on Pierpont Street that lacked electricity and indoor plumbing. At a young age, Day became enamored with baseball, often playing local sandlot games or taking the long walk from his neighborhood to Maryland Ball Park where he watched the Baltimore Black Sox.

Day participated in Mount Winans Athletic Club when he was 12 and 13 years old. Because his campus did not offer a baseball program, in 1933, at 17 years old, Day dropped out of Frederick Douglass High School to join the semi-professional team the Silver Moons. With the club, he was predominantly a second baseman, "but if the pitcher got in trouble", recollected Day, "I'd say 'Give me the ball'".

== Baseball career ==
=== Negro leagues ===
Day was discovered by Herbert "Rap" Dixon, a former Negro leagues baseball player and manager of the Black Sox, who took notice of his exceptional fielding and pitching abilities. In early 1934, Day was signed to a professional baseball contract worth $60 per month, gaining valuable insight during the season from his teammate Lamon Yokeley. However, due to the financial instability of the organization, the Black Sox disbanded at the end of the year. Day, Dixon, Yokeley, and other high-profile teammates subsequently signed with the Brooklyn Eagles in 1935. There, Day was mentored on his pickoff move by pitcher Ted "Double Duty" Radcliffe. The Eagles' general manager, Ben Taylor, sensed potential in the promising prospect and incorporated Day into the starting rotation. His first regular season on the mound, Day finished with a 9–2 record, highlighted by a one-hitter, and earned his first of seven East–West All-Star Game appearances.

In 1936, Day was recognized as the ace of the recently relocated Newark Eagles pitching staff, bringing "a lot of intangibles to his game—his tenacity in going after hitters, his speed and quickness in fielding the ball, and his dedication to the game", as Day's teammate of five years Max Manning recalled. His best season in the Negro leagues came in 1937, when Day was backed by the vaunted "million-dollar infield" consisting of Ray Dandridge, Willie Wells, Dick Seay, and Mule Suttles. Though just 5-foot-9 inches, Day delivered a 90–95 mph fastball. The pitch was deceptively fast because Day delivered with no windup, and threw the competition off-balance with his pinpoint accurate curveball. Day posted a perfect 13–0 season, coupled by a 3.02 earned run average (ERA), .320 batting average, and eight home runs. When he was not active on the mound, Day at one point or another played at every position, with the exception of catcher, and was a dangerous bat in the line-up, excelling to such an extent that Day drew comparisons to Babe Ruth's legendary batting talent. Some writers like Daniel Nathan and Thomas Kern even argue that Day should have been a full-time outfielder to have his bat in the line-up every game.

On July 31, 1942, Day set a Negro league record for strikeouts in a single game, striking out 18 batters from the Baltimore Elite Giants in a one-hit shutout. The only hit manufactured against Day that outing was a bloop single to left field off the bat of "Pee Wee" Butts. In the 1942 East-West All-Star Game, with runners threatening in the seventh inning, Day entered in relief to strike out seven batters, the most recorded by a pitcher in an East-West All-Star appearance. Although the Newark Eagles failed to secure the Negro National League pennant that season, Day still participated in the Negro League World Series thanks to an odd transaction. After dropping the first three games, the Homestead Grays acquired Day on loan from the Eagles. He bested his rival Satchel Paige and the Kansas City Monarchs in a 4–1 Game Four victory. In response to the upset, the Pittsburgh Courier, one of the most respected newspapers covering the Negro leagues, ranked Day ahead of Paige as the best pitcher in the league in 1942 and 1943. For his performance, Day was rewarded with $100 and a train ride back to Baltimore. The outcome of the game was thrown out on appeal by the Monarchs, however, for the Grays' use of unauthorized players. Without Day, the replay of the game was won by the Monarchs, sealing the series sweep.

=== World War II ===
On September 1, 1943, Day was drafted into military service. He entered into active service on September 22, 1943. He eventually served in the 818th Amphibian Battalion and landed on Utah Beach six days after Operation Overlord to drop supplies. Following VE-Day, he was stationed in France. Day and fellow Negro leaguer Willard Brown were recruited to the Oise All-Stars; Philadelphia Phillies pitcher Sam Nahem was the player-manager of the team. The team easily overcame the competition to reach the ETO World Series to face the 71st Infantry Division team, composed predominantly of Major League Baseball players. By contrast, the OISE club consisted of a mismatched roster of various minor leaguers, Negro leaguers, and semi-professionals. Before a crowd of 50,000 at Stadion Nürnberg in Germany, Day pitched in Game Two for a 2–1 victory as the OISE All-Stars eventually won the championship in five games. Day's date of separation from the Army was March 14, 1946. His honorable discharge lists his military occupational specialty as Amphibian Truck Driver (934), his decorations and citations as the European-African-Middle-Eastern (EAME) Service Medal and the WWII Victory Medal, and his final rank as Technician 5th Grade (Tec 5). It also lists his height as 5'10" and his weight as 180 pounds.

=== Return to baseball ===
Following his discharge from the military, Day returned to the Eagles in time for Opening Day on May 5, 1946. Despite not having pitched professionally for so long, he threw a no-hitter against the Philadelphia Stars in a 2–0 victory, allowing just three base runners via a walk and two errors charged to his teammates. Hampered by a lingering arm injury, Day nonetheless led the league that season in wins, strikeouts, and complete games. That same year, in the Negro League World Series, he pitched in two games as the Eagles edged the Monarchs in seven games, winning the championship. He played his final season in the Negro leagues in 1949 with the Baltimore Elite Giants. Record keeping was poor during Day's career; partial statistics credit him with a 67–29 record, but league historians claim he won as many as 300 games.

=== Other leagues ===
During the 1935 offseason, Day traveled to Puerto Rico to participate in the country's winter ball league. Beginning with his first trip in 1935, he played six seasons of winter ball in Puerto Rico, spending most of his time with the Aguadilla Sharks.

Much as with the Negro leagues, records of games were poorly documented, but some statistics show Day went 34–26 in his career with the team, and he established the league's record for most strikeouts in a game, posting 19 in 1939.

In 1940, Day spent parts of the winter playing in the Venezuelan League, and for the Veracruz Red Eagles of the Mexican Baseball League, where he finished the season with a record of 6–0.

He returned to the Mexican League in 1947 and 1948 for the financial remuneration, however, comparatively speaking, the venture was unsuccessful for Day, who finished with a combined record of 18–20 and a 4.00 ERA.

Following his departure from the Negro leagues in 1950, Day spent a season with the semi-professional Winnipeg Buffalos of the Mandak League. Finally, in 1951 Day made his debut in organized baseball, albeit in the minors, with the Toronto Maple Leafs, a Triple-A club where Day tallied a 1–1 record with a 1.58 ERA through 14 games. Lastly, Day also played for two other Class-A teams in the St. Louis Browns farm system, the Scranton Miners and the Edmonton Eskimos, before retiring from professional baseball in 1955 at age 39.

== Later life and legacy ==
In his post-baseball career, Day worked as a bartender in Newark before returning to his hometown in Baltimore in 1970, where he held a position as a security guard until 1979. Before Day's death in 1995, there were numerous efforts to celebrate his career and induct Day into the Baseball Hall of Fame in Cooperstown, a long-time dream of his. One such effort was made by Mayor Kurt Schmoke who declared January 31, 1992, Leon Day's Day in Baltimore. Governor William Donald Schaefer made a similar proclamation for Annapolis later that same year on May 10. Day threw out the ceremonial first pitch to Pat Borders at the 1993 Major League Baseball All-Star Game. Day's discreet demeanor and humble personality often understated his several accomplishments, most likely leading to him being overlooked by the Baseball Hall of Fame's voting committee. After falling short one vote of being inducted in 1993, Day was elected to the Hall of Fame on March 7, 1995. Six days later, Day died of heart failure while in hospice at St. Agnes Hospital in Baltimore; he was 78 years old.

Impossible to ignore was Day's disparity to his rival, Paige. Historians have noted that Paige had a boisterous approach compared to Day's reserved demeanor; Paige was tall and Day was short and slender; and Paige worked hard to promote his name while Day shied away from attention. The pitchers' infrequent head-to-head matchups led to remarkable pitching duels, three of which Day won.

Posthumous efforts were designed to honor Day. Baltimore renamed a west city park in 1997, refurbished with a baseball field and a sign welcoming visitors to "Negro League Hall of Famer Leon Day Park". Day's widow, Geraldine, established the Leon Day Foundation in 2001 to sponsor organized sports and preserve the cultural significance of the Negro leagues.

In 2013, the Bob Feller Act of Valor Award honored Day as one of 37 Baseball Hall of Fame members for his service in the United States Army during World War II.
