= Clarence Isreal =

American baseball player

- Born: February 15, 1918; Marietta, Georgia, U.S.
- Died: April 12, 1987 (aged 69); Rockville, Maryland, U.S.
- Batted: Right Threw: Right

debut
- 1940, for the Newark Eagles

Last appearance
- 1947, for the Homestead Grays

Negro National League statistics
- Batting average: .228
- Home runs: 6
- Runs scored: 78
- Stats at Baseball Reference

Teams
- Newark Eagles (1940–1942, 1946); Homestead Grays (1946–1947)

Career highlights and awards
- Negro League World Series champion (1946)

Clarence Charles "Pint" Isreal (February 15, 1918 – April 12, 1987) was an American Negro league baseball player.

A native of Marietta, Georgia, Isreal played for the Newark Eagles and Homestead Grays between 1940 and 1947, and served in the US Army during World War II. He died in Rockville, Maryland in 1987 at age 69.
