= Steve Wylie =

American baseball player (1911–1993)

- Pitcher
- Born: May 7, 1911; Clarksville, Tennessee, U.S.
- Died: October 23, 1993 (aged 82); Fredonia, Tennessee, U.S.
- Batted: Right Threw: Right

Negro league baseball debut
- 1940, for the Memphis Red Sox

Last appearance
- 1947, for the Chicago American Giants

Teams
- Memphis Red Sox (1944); Kansas City Monarchs (1944–1947); Chicago American Giants (1947)

Steve Enloe Wylie (May 7, 1911 – October 23, 1993) was an American professional baseball pitcher in the Negro leagues. He played from 1944 to 1947 with the Memphis Red Sox, Kansas City Monarchs and Chicago American Giants.
