= Norman Banks (baseball) =

American baseball player

- Third baseman
- Batted: Unknown Threw: Unknown

Negro league baseball debut
- 1945, for the Newark Eagles

Last appearance
- 1945, for the Newark Eagles
- Stats at Baseball Reference

Teams
- Newark Eagles (1945)

Norman Earl Banks was an American professional baseball third baseman in the Negro leagues. He played with the Newark Eagles in 1945.
