= Chico Renfroe =

- Shortstop
- Born: January 1, 1923; Newark, New Jersey, U.S.
- Died: September 1, 1991 (aged 68); Atlanta, Georgia, U.S.
- Batted: Right Threw: Right

Negro league baseball debut
- 1945, for the Kansas City Monarchs

Last Negro league baseball appearance
- 1953, for the Kansas City Monarchs

Teams
- Kansas City Monarchs (1945–1947, 1953); Cleveland Buckeyes (1948–1949); Indianapolis Clowns (1949–1950); Torreon Algodoneros (1955)

Othello Nelson "Chico" Renfroe (March 1, 1923 – September 3, 1991) was an American professional baseball shortstop in the Negro leagues and in the Mexican League. He played from 1945 to 1953 with several teams, including the Kansas City Monarchs, Cleveland Buckeyes, Indianapolis Clowns and the Torreon Algodoneros. After retiring from baseball, Renfroe worked for the United States Postal Service and was the sports director of WIGO. He also worked as an official scorer for the Atlanta Braves.
