= Tuts McBride =

- Left fielder
- Born: May 11, 1916; Savannah, Georgia, U.S.
- Died: May 8, 2004 (aged 87); New York City, U.S.
- Batted: Unknown Threw: Unknown

Negro league baseball debut
- 1941, for the Newark Eagles

Last appearance
- 1941, for the Newark Eagles

Teams
- Newark Eagles (1941)

Charles Henry "Tuts" McBride (May 11, 1916 – May 8, 2004) was an American professional baseball left fielder in the Negro leagues. He played with the Newark Eagles in 1941.
