= Bob Harvey (baseball) =

American baseball player

- Outfielder
- Born: May 28, 1918; St. Michaels, Maryland, U.S.
- Died: June 27, 1992 (aged 74); Montclair, New Jersey, U.S.
- Batted: Left Threw: Right

debut
- 1943, for the Newark Eagles

Last appearance
- 1950, for the Houston Eagles

Career statistics
- Batting average: .313
- Hits: 240
- Home runs: 9
- Runs batted in: 118
- Stolen bases: 5
- Stats at Baseball Reference

Teams
- Newark Eagles (1943–1948); Birmingham Black Barons (1945); Houston Eagles (1950)

Career highlights and awards
- 2× All-Star (1948, 1950); Negro League World Series champion (1946)

Robert Alexander Harvey (May 28, 1918 – June 27, 1992) was an American outfielder in Negro league baseball. He played for the Newark Eagles, Birmingham Black Barons, and Houston Eagles between 1943 and 1950.
