= Cotton Williams =

American baseball player

- Pitcher / Infielder
- Born: January 18, 1917; Maryland, U.S.
- Died: December 28, 2000 (aged 83); Philadelphia, Pennsylvania, U.S.
- Batted: Right Threw: Right

Negro leagues debut
- 1943, for the Newark Eagles

Last appearance
- 1951, for the Philadelphia Stars

Teams
- Newark Eagles (1943, 1946–1948); Houston Eagles (1949–1950); New Orleans Eagles (1951); Philadelphia Stars (1943)

Robert A. "Cotton" Williams (January 18, 1917 – December 28, 2000) was an American professional baseball pitcher and infielder in the Negro leagues. He played from 1943 to 1951, playing mostly with the Newark Eagles.
