= Larry Doby =

American baseball player (1923–2003)

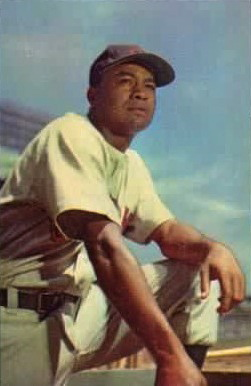
- Doby with the Cleveland Indians in 1953
- Center fielder / Manager
- Born: December 13, 1923; Camden, South Carolina, U.S.
- Died: June 18, 2003 (aged 79); Montclair, New Jersey, U.S.
- Batted: Left Threw: Right

Professional debut
- NgL: 1942, for the Newark Eagles
- MLB: July 5, 1947, for the Cleveland Indians
- NPB: June 30, 1962, for the Chunichi Dragons

Last appearance
- MLB: June 26, 1959, for the Chicago White Sox
- NPB: October 9, 1962, for the Chunichi Dragons

MLB statistics
- Batting average: .288
- Home runs: 273
- Runs batted in: 1,099
- Managerial record: 37–50
- Winning %: .425

NPB statistics
- Batting average: .224
- Home runs: 10
- Runs batted in: 35
- Stats at Baseball Reference
- Managerial record at Baseball Reference

Teams
- As player: Newark Eagles (1942–1944, 1946–1947); Cleveland Indians (1947–1955); Chicago White Sox (1956–1957); Cleveland Indians (1958); Detroit Tigers (1959); Chicago White Sox (1959); Chunichi Dragons (1962); As manager: Chicago White Sox (1978)

Career highlights and awards
- NgL All-Star (1946); 7× All-Star (1949–1955); Negro World Series champion (1946); World Series champion (1948); 2× AL home run leader (1952, 1954); AL RBI leader (1954); Cleveland Guardians No. 14 retired; Cleveland Guardians Hall of Fame

Member of the National

Baseball Hall of Fame
- Induction: 1998
- Election method: Veterans Committee

Lawrence Eugene Doby (December 13, 1923 – June 18, 2003) was an American professional baseball player in the Negro leagues and Major League Baseball (MLB) who was the second black player to break baseball's color barrier and the first black player in the American League. A native of Camden, South Carolina, and three-sport all-state athlete while in high school in Paterson, New Jersey, Doby accepted a basketball scholarship from Long Island University. At 17 years of age, he began his professional baseball career with the Newark Eagles as the team's second baseman. Doby joined the United States Navy during World War II. His military service complete, Doby returned to baseball in 1946, and along with teammate Monte Irvin, helped the Eagles win the Negro League World Series.

In July 1947, three months after Jackie Robinson made history with the Brooklyn Dodgers, Doby broke the color barrier in the American League when he signed a contract to play with Bill Veeck's Cleveland Indians. Doby was the first player to go directly to the majors from the Negro leagues. A seven-time All-Star center fielder, Doby and teammate Satchel Paige were the first African-American players to win a World Series championship when the Indians took the crown in 1948. He helped the Indians win 111 games (second-best in MLB history at the time) and the AL pennant in 1954, finished second in the American League Most Valuable Player (MVP) award voting and was the AL's RBI leader and home run champion. He went on to play for the Chicago White Sox, Detroit Tigers, and Chunichi Dragons before his retirement as a player in 1962.

Doby later served as the second black manager in the majors with the Chicago White Sox, and in 1995 was appointed to a position in the AL's executive office. He also served as a director with the New Jersey Nets of the National Basketball Association (NBA). He was selected to the National Baseball Hall of Fame in 1998 by the Hall's Veterans Committee and died in 2003 at the age of 79.

== Early life ==
Doby was born in Camden, South Carolina, to David Doby and Etta Brooks on December 13, 1923. Doby's father served in World War I. David worked as a horse groomer and played semi-professional baseball, but drowned in an accident at age 37 in New York state. Doby's mother, who had divorced David before his death, moved to Paterson, New Jersey; Doby remained in Camden. He lived with his grandmother before moving to live with his father's sister and brother-in-law from 1934 to 1938. He attended Jackson School, which was segregated under South Carolina state law. His first opportunity to play organized baseball came as a student at Boylan-Haven-Mather Academy, a private school affiliated with the Methodist church. Richard Dubose, who had managed Doby's father and was known locally in African-American circles for his baseball expertise, gave Doby some of his first baseball lessons. Reflecting on his years growing up in South Carolina, including how he and playmates used worn down broom handles for bats, Doby said, "Growing up in Camden, we didn't have baseball bats. We'd use a tree here, a tin can there, for bases."

After completing eighth grade, Doby moved north to Paterson at the age of 14 to be reunited with his mother; she visited him weekly while he lived with one of her friends. At Paterson Eastside High School, Doby was a multi-sport athlete; as well as playing baseball and basketball, he was a wide receiver in football and lettered in track. After winning a state football championship, the Eastside team was invited to play in Florida, but the promoters would not allow Doby, the only black player on the team, to participate. Consequently, the team voted to forgo the trip as a gesture of support for Doby.

During summer vacation Doby played baseball with a black semi-pro team, the Smart Sets, where he played with future Hall of Fame shortstop Monte Irvin. He also had a brief stint with the Harlem Renaissance, a professional basketball team, as an unpaid substitute player. Upon completing high school, he accepted an athletic scholarship to play basketball at Long Island University Brooklyn (LIU). Doby had been dating Eastside classmate Helyn Curvy since his sophomore year and, according to Doby, being able to remain close to Paterson was the "main reason" he selected LIU.

In the summer before he enrolled at LIU, Doby accepted an offer to play for the Newark Eagles of the Negro National League (NNL) for the remainder of the 1942 season, and he transferred to Virginia Union University as a result.

== Negro leagues and World War II ==
Negro league umpire Henry Moore advised Newark Eagles' owners Abe and Effa Manley to give Doby a tryout at Hinchliffe Stadium in Paterson, which was successful; Doby joined the Eagles in 1942 at the age of 17 for $300. The contract stated Doby would play until September when he would start classes at college; to protect his amateur status he signed using the alias "Larry Walker" and local reporters were told he originated from Los Angeles, California. On May 31, Doby appeared in his first professional game when the Eagles played against the New York Cubans at Yankee Stadium. In the 26 games where box scores have been found, Doby's batting average was .391. Doby recalled a game against catcher Josh Gibson and pitcher Ray Brown of the Homestead Grays:

My first time up, Josh said, 'We're going to find out if you can hit a fastball.' I singled. Next time up, Josh said, 'We're going to find out if you can hit a curveball.' I singled. Third time up, Josh said, 'We're going to find out how you do after you're knocked down.' I popped up the first time after they knocked me down. The second time, I singled.

Doby's career in Newark was interrupted for two years for service in the United States Navy. Doby spent 1943 and part of 1944 at Camp Robert Smalls at the Great Lakes Naval Training School near Chicago. He appeared on an all-black baseball squad and maintained a .342 batting average against teams composed of white players, some of which featured major leaguers. He then went to Treasure Island Naval Base in San Francisco Bay, California. Before serving in the Pacific Theater of World War II, Doby spent time at Navy sites in Ogden, Utah, and San Diego, California. He was stationed on Ulithi in the Pacific Ocean in 1945. Doby heard of Jackie Robinson's minor league contract deal with the Montreal Royals of the International League from his base on Ulithi listening to Armed Forces Radio, and as a result Doby saw real hope in becoming a Major League baseball player. While in Hawaii, Doby met fellow Navy man and future teammate Mickey Vernon. Vernon, then with the Washington Senators, was so impressed with Doby's skills he wrote to Senators owner Clark Griffith, encouraging Griffith to sign Doby should MLB ever allow integration. During his time in the Navy, Doby was described by his colleagues as quiet. Doby was discharged from the Navy in January 1946. In the summer of that year, Doby and Helyn Curvy were married.

After playing for the San Juan Senators in Puerto Rico, Doby rejoined the Eagles in 1946. He made the All-Star roster, batted .360 (fourth in the NNL), hit five home runs (fifth) and led the NNL in triples (six). Manager Biz Mackey led the Eagles, including Doby, Monte Irvin and Johnny Davis, to the Negro World Series championship over Satchel Paige and the Kansas City Monarchs in seven games to conclude the 1946 season. For the Series, Doby hit .372 with one home run, five RBIs, and three stolen bases. Many in the Negro leagues believed Doby or Irvin would be first to break the MLB color barrier, not Robinson. On considering a career in Major League Baseball, Doby said, "I never dreamed that far ahead. Growing up in a segregated society, you couldn't have thought that that was the way it was going to be. There was no bright spot as far as looking at baseball until Mr. Robinson got the opportunity to play in Montreal in '46."

== Major League Baseball career ==
=== Integration of American League (1947) ===
Cleveland Indians owner and team president Bill Veeck proposed integrating baseball in 1942, which had been informally segregated since the turn of the century, but this was rejected by Commissioner Kenesaw Mountain Landis. Veeck had begun the process of finding a young, talented player from the Negro leagues, and told a reporter in Cleveland that he would integrate the Indians' roster if he could find a black player with the necessary talent level who could withstand the taunts and pressure of being the first black athlete in the AL. The reporter suggested Doby, whom Veeck had seen at the Great Lakes Naval Training School. Doby's name was also mentioned when Veeck talked with reporters who covered the Negro leagues. Indians scout Bill Killefer rated Doby favorably and perhaps just as important for Veeck, reported Doby's off-field behavior was not a concern. The Dodgers rated Doby their top young Negro league prospect. But unlike the Brooklyn Dodgers' Branch Rickey, who signed Robinson one full season before bringing him to the National League, Veeck used a different strategy, letting Doby remain with the Eagles instead of bringing him through the Indians' farm system. He told the Pittsburgh Courier, "One afternoon when the team trots out on the field, a Negro player will be out there with it."

While Rickey declined to pay for the purchasing rights of Robinson while he played for the Kansas City Monarchs, Veeck was "determined to buy Doby's contract from the Eagles" and had no problem paying purchasing rights. Effa Manley, business manager for the Eagles, believed her club's close relationship with the New York Yankees might put Doby in a Yankees uniform, but they did not take interest in him. Veeck finalized a contract deal for Doby with Manley on July 3, 1947. Veeck paid her a total of $15,000 for her second baseman—$10,000 for taking him from the Eagles and another $5,000 once it was determined he would stay with the Indians for at least 30 days. After Manley agreed to Veeck's offer, she stated to him, "If Larry Doby were white and a free agent, you'd give him $100,000 to sign as a bonus." The press were not told that Doby had been signed by the Indians as Veeck wanted to manage how fans in Cleveland would be introduced to Doby. "I moved slowly and carefully, perhaps even timidly", Veeck said. The Eagles had a doubleheader on July 4 but Doby, who had a .415 batting average and 14 home runs to that point in the season, only played in the first as Veeck sent his assistant and public relations personnel member, Louis Jones, for Doby. The two took a train from Newark to Chicago where the Indians were scheduled to play the Chicago White Sox the next day.

On July 5, with the Indians in Chicago in the midst of a road trip, Doby made his debut as the second black baseball player after Robinson to play in the majors after establishment of the baseball color line. Veeck hired two plainclothes police officers to accompany Doby as he went to Comiskey Park. Player-manager Lou Boudreau initially had a hard time finding a place in the lineup for Doby, who had played second base and shortstop for most of his career. Boudreau himself was the regular shortstop, while Joe Gordon was the second baseman. That day, Doby met his new teammates for the first time. "I walked down that line, stuck out my hand, and very few hands came back in return. Most of the ones that did were cold-fish handshakes, along with a look that said, 'You don't belong here", Doby reminisced years later. Four of Doby's teammates did not shake his hand, and of those, two turned their backs to Doby when he tried to introduce himself. During warm-ups, Doby languished for minutes while his teammates interacted with one another. Not until Joe Gordon asked Doby to play catch with him was Doby given the chance to engage. Gordon befriended Doby and became one of his closest friends on the team.

Doby entered the game in the seventh inning as a pinch-hitter for relief pitcher Bryan Stephens and recorded a strikeout. In the 1949 movie The Kid from Cleveland, Veeck tells the story that Gordon struck out on three swings in his immediate at-bat after Doby to save face for his new teammate. However, Doby's second strike was the result of a foul ball, both the Associated Press and Chicago Tribune stated Doby struck out on five pitches instead of three, and in addition, Gordon was standing on third base during Doby's at-bat. From Pride and Prejudice: The Biography of Larry Doby:

After the game, Doby quickly showered and dressed without incident in the Cleveland clubhouse. His escort, Louis Jones, then took him not to the Del Prado Hotel downtown, where the Indians players stayed, but to the black DuSable Hotel in Chicago's predominantly black South Side, near Comiskey Park. The segregated arrangement established a pattern, on Doby's first day, that he would be compelled to follow, in spring training and during the regular season, in many cities, throughout his playing career.

The Indians had a doubleheader against the White Sox on Sunday, July 6, for which 31,566 were in attendance; it was estimated that approximately 30 percent of the crowd were black. Some congregations of black churches let out early while others walked immediately from Sunday service to Comiskey Park. Boudreau had Doby pinch-hit in the first game but for the second, listed him a starter at first base, a position Doby was not expected to fill when the Indians brought him up to play at second base. Doby had played the position before with the Eagles but was without a proper mitt for first base and met much resistance when attempts were made to borrow one from teammates, including first baseman Eddie Robinson, whom Boudreau had asked Doby to replace that day. Doby said only because Gordon asked in the clubhouse to borrow one of the first baseman's mitts did he have one to use in the second game of the doubleheader as earlier direct requests from Doby were rejected. The mitt was loaned by a White Sox player. Boudreau recounts an incident where Robinson refused the mitt to Doby, but when asked by Indians traveling secretary Spud Goldstein, Robinson obliged. It was the only game Doby started for the remainder of the season. Doby recorded his first major league hit in four at-bats and had an RBI in a 5–1 Indians win.

A columnist wrote in the Plain Dealer on July 8: "Cleveland's man in the street is the right sort of American, as was evidenced right solidly once more by the response to the question: 'How does the signing of Larry Doby by the Indians strike you? Said the man in the street: Can he hit? ... That's all that counts." Conversely, Doby was criticized from players both active and retired. Noted former player Rogers Hornsby said, after watching Doby play one time in 1947:

Bill Veeck did the Negro race no favor when he signed Larry Doby to a Cleveland contract. If Veeck wanted to demonstrate that the Negro has no place in major league baseball, he could have used no subtler means to establish the point. If he were white he wouldn't be considered good enough to play with a semi-pro club. He is fast on his feet but that lets him out. He hasn't any other quality that could possibly recommend him.

In his rookie year, Doby hit .156 (5-for-32) in 29 games. He played four games at second base and one each at first base and shortstop. Throughout the season, he talked with Jackie Robinson via telephone, the two encouraging each other. "And Jackie and I agreed we shouldn't challenge anybody or cause trouble—or we'd both be out of the big leagues, just like that. We figured that if we spoke out, we would ruin things for other black players." After his rookie season, Doby again pursued time on the basketball court and appeared with the Paterson Crescents of the American Basketball League after signing a contract in January 1948. He was the first black player to join the league.

=== Cleveland Indians ===
==== 1948–1950 ====
He was a great American, served the country in World War II, and he was a great ballplayer. He was kind of like Buzz Aldrin, the second man on the moon, because he was the second African-American in the majors behind Jackie Robinson. He was just as good of a ballplayer, an exciting player, and a very good teammate.

— Hall of Famer Bob Feller, teammate with Doby 1947–55

In 1948, Doby experienced his first spring training with the Indians in Tucson, Arizona. Unlike their white teammates, Doby, along with Satchel Paige and Minnie Miñoso, were not permitted to stay at the nearby Santa Rita hotel but instead stayed with a local black family and used a rental car provided by the Indians for transportation. During spring training, Doby read books concerning outfield play, and received instruction and encouragement from former Indians manager Tris Speaker and Indians' farm system director Hank Greenberg. Doby also credited Indians coach Bill McKechnie with helping him adjust to the majors and learning the outfield. In an exhibition game in Houston against the New York Giants, Doby hit a home run that "may have traveled 500 feet before landing far beyond the fence in center field." As Moore wrote in his biography of Doby, "With that home run, all doubts that Doby would make the 1948 Cleveland team vanished. That year, he played in 121 games and hit .301 for the season with 14 home runs and 66 RBIs. Throughout the regular season Doby was racially abused by opposing teams, and Veeck asked AL president Will Harridge for support in getting players to rein in their animosity towards Doby.

Doby played a major role in Cleveland's World Series victory against the Boston Braves. In Game 4 on October 9, Doby hit the first home run by a black player in World Series history. A picture featuring an embrace between Doby and white teammate Steve Gromek, who had pitched a complete game that day, was on the cover of the next day's Plain Dealer. Richard Goldstein of The New York Times called the photograph "a signature moment in the integration of Major League Baseball." Of the picture, Doby said, "The picture was more rewarding and happy for me than actually hitting the home run. The picture finally showed a moment of a man showing his feelings for me." The Indians defeated the Braves in six games and with it, Cleveland had its first World Series championship since the 1920 season. Doby's .318 batting average during the Series led the Indians. Nationally syndicated columnist Grantland Rice argued that without Doby and Gene Bearden, who had won 20 games that year, the Indians would have finished in fourth or fifth place. After the Series, Doby received a celebratory parade in Paterson, New Jersey, and during the offseason he, along with other teammates, appeared in the 1949 film The Kid From Cleveland. With additional income available due to the post-season run and Series championship, Doby and his wife attempted to buy a home in Paterson in an all-white neighborhood but were kept out by a petition from members of the community. The Dobys were allowed to purchase their desired home when the Paterson city mayor intervened on their behalf.

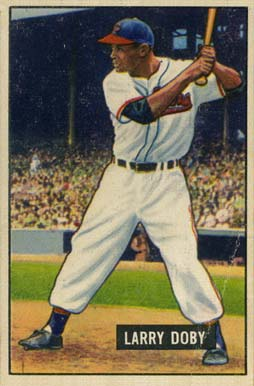
A 1951 Bowman trading card of Doby

During the 1949 season, Doby was selected to his first MLB All-Star Game. He was one of five Indians selected by Boudreau and joined Jackie Robinson, Roy Campanella and Don Newcombe as the first black players to be amongst those chosen to participate in the 1949 All-Star Game. Boudreau fined Doby after he attempted to steal home with no outs and bases loaded in a game against the Yankees on July 20. Of the fine, Boudreau said, "It was not based only on that attempt to steal home. Larry has taken several unnecessary chances lately. This should make him more careful." His home run (24) and RBI (85) totals increased during the 1949 season, and by 1950, he was considered the best center fielder in the game by The Sporting News. By the first week in July, Doby's .370 batting average trailed only 1949 AL batting champion George Kell, who had a .375 average. He earned career-bests in batting average (.326), hits (164) and on-base percentage (OBP) (.442), while playing in 142 games. Doby hit the 100-RBI mark (102) for the first time in his career while his OBP led the AL. He finished eighth in AL MVP voting, highest among outfielders. At the end of the season, Cleveland signed him to a new, more lucrative contract. Doby was named by Cleveland sports writers as the Cleveland Baseball Man of the Year after the season, the first time a black player was chosen.

==== 1951–1955 ====
Doby hit 20 home runs and 69 RBIs in 1951, both fewer than the previous season, and his batting average improved to .295. His 21-game hit-streak was the second-longest for the Indians that season, behind Dale Mitchell's mark of 23 games in a row. Indians general manager Hank Greenberg reduced Doby's salary due to the lower home run numbers despite Doby, who attributed the lower numbers to tightness in his legs, stating he would not accept a pay cut. Indians manager Al López confirmed that Doby was injury-riddled throughout the season, stating that he "was beset by first one injury and then another" including "a muscle tear in his thigh, a groin pull, an ankle twist." Doby received blame for the Indians' failure to win the AL pennant and was labeled a "loner" by some in the press, including Plain Dealer sports editor Gordon Cobbledick who in an article in Sport wrote "Larry's a mixed-up guy—a badly mixed-up guy" stemming from "the emotional impact of discovering racial prejudice against him." Cobbledick also took issue with Doby's assertion that opposing pitchers were knocking him down due to Doby being black. The assertion was confirmed by Sam Lacy, who wrote in the Baltimore Afro-American, "Statistics show that eight colored players in the two major leagues were hit by pitches a total of 68 times during the 1951 campaign, an average of 8 1/2 times per man. No other player was hit as many as eight times in the season."

One month before spring training for the 1952 season, Doby employed former Olympic track and field athlete Harrison Dillard to come to his home in New Jersey to prepare his legs in hopes of eliminating injuries, which had affected him the previous season. Dillard and the Indians' team doctor prescribed lower-body warm-ups to Doby before the start of each game. Leg injuries continued to bother Doby during the start of the season. On June 4, 1952, he hit for the cycle. By the end of the 1952 season, Doby was second in the AL in RBIs to teammate Al Rosen by one, 105 to 104. His .541 slugging percentage, runs scored (104), strikeout (111), and home run (32) totals were all highest in the AL.

Leading up to the 1953 season, Doby asked Greenberg and Indians management for a pay raise after earning $22,000 the previous season. In early March, the raise was granted, and he was slated to make $28,000 that year. For 1953, Doby had a .263 batting average, which was his lowest since joining the league in 1947. He led the AL in strikeouts for the second and final time in his career, a career-high 121 times, but hit 29 home runs and 102 RBIs on the year. He also had 96 walks, which was third in the AL.

For the sixth time in his major league career, Doby was named an All-Star during the 1954 season, one of five Indians named. The game was held at Cleveland's Municipal Stadium and featured the second-largest crowd to watch an All-Star Game (the largest was in 1935 at the same stadium). In what would prove his final career All-Star at bat, Doby hit a pinch-hit solo home run in the eighth inning to tie the game at 9–9; the AL squad went on to win, 11–9. His home run was the first hit by a black player in an All-Star Game. The game, which had a record 17 hits by the AL and was the highest-scoring All-Star Game until 1998, was called the best ever by All-Star Game founder Arch Ward. As the regular season resumed, Doby helped the Indians to win a franchise-record 111 games and the AL pennant. His regular season 32 home runs and career-high 126 RBIs were highest in the AL, which led to him finishing second in AL MVP voting. The Indians were swept in the 1954 World Series by Doby's former Eagles teammate Monte Irvin and the New York Giants.

In his last full season with the Indians in 1955, Doby was selected for his seventh consecutive and final All-Star Game. Doby's leg injuries affected him severely at this point in his career and he did not enter the game. He finished the 1955 season with 26 home runs and 75 RBIs while hitting .291 in 131 games, his fewest played since 1948. Not all in Cleveland were disappointed to see Doby leaving. Wrote one Plain Dealer columnist, Franklin Lewis: "He has been a controversial athlete. Highly gifted, he was frequently morose, sullen, and upon occasion, downright surly to his teammates ... He thought of himself, at the beginning, as the symbol of the Negro in his league." Doby responded, "I was looked on as a Black man, not as a human being. I did feel a responsibility to the Black players who came after me, but that was a responsibility, basically, to people, not just to Black people."

=== Later years (1956–1960) ===
After spending nine seasons with Cleveland, Doby was traded on October 25, 1955, to the Chicago White Sox for Chico Carrasquel and Jim Busby. Chicago was looking for a consistent home run hitter after finishing the season with 116 home runs as a team. "The search is over for a long ball hitter. We've certainly needed a consistent one—and we've been eying Doby for some time", said White Sox vice president Chuck Comiskey. White Sox manager Marty Marion believed Doby's bat would be a welcome addition to his club when he said, "The guy used to murder us when we played Cleveland. He'll make a big difference in the number of one-run and two-run decisions we might lose." After winning a doubleheader against the Yankees on June 22, 1956, Doby and the White Sox swept New York, the first time since the 1945 season the Yankees had been swept in a four-game series. The White Sox won eight straight games, the longest winning streak in the AL to that point in the season, and had done so with the help of Doby's six home runs during the eight-game stretch. "You know, when we dealt for Doby, we weren't worried about Larry. We knew he'd come through", Comiskey said. Doby finished the season with a .268 batting average and led the team with 24 home runs and 102 RBIs. Chicago finished 1956 in third place in the AL with an 85–69 record.

In a game on August 20, 1957, against the Washington Senators, Doby helped preserve pitcher Bob Keegan's no-hitter with a backhand catch off a long line drive from Herb Plews, one of "two close calls" for Keegan that game. His 1957 home run total of 14 tied for the team-high, as he managed a .288 average and recorded 79 RBIs, second-highest on the team after former Indians teammate Minnie Miñoso. The White Sox finished second in the AL with a 90–64 record.

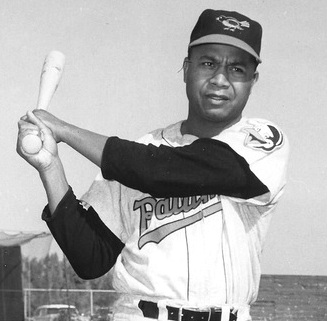
Doby at the Baltimore Orioles' spring training camp in 1958. He was traded to the Cleveland Indians before appearing in a regular season game for Baltimore.

Doby was part of a December 3, 1957, multi-player trade between the White Sox and Baltimore Orioles, then was traded again on April 1 to Cleveland along with Don Ferrarese for Gene Woodling, Bud Daley, and Dick Williams. He appeared in 89 games with the Indians that season and had a .289 batting average, 13 home runs, and 45 RBIs. He was sent to the Detroit Tigers on March 21, 1959, in exchange for Tito Francona. Tigers general manager Rick Ferrell said, "this gives us some more power and we just hope Doby hits as well in Briggs Stadium this season as he has in other years." He hit .218 with four RBIs before Detroit sold the 35-year-old Doby to the White Sox on May 13 for $20,000.

After 21 games with the White Sox, he was sent to Triple-A affiliate San Diego Padres of the Pacific Coast League after hitting .241 with no home runs and 9 RBIs. Doby fractured an ankle while sliding into third base after hitting a triple during a road game the Padres played against Sacramento, and was sent to a local hospital in Sacramento before going to Johns Hopkins Hospital for further evaluation. Doby worked out with the White Sox before the 1960 season but, due to nagging injuries, did not earn a roster spot. In late April he joined the Toronto Maple Leafs of the International League on a trial basis but was released by the team on May 6 after X-rays showed bone deterioration in his affected ankle.

Doby finished his 13-year major league career with a .283 batting average, accumulated 1,515 hits, 253 home runs and 970 RBIs in 1,533 games and 5,348 at-bats. Of his 1,533 career games, 1,146 of them were spent with the Indians. "I played against great talent in the Major Leagues and I played against great talent in the Negro Leagues. I didn't see a lot of difference", said Doby.

=== Nippon baseball (1962) ===
Doby had participated in baseball clinics in 1962 as a member of a travel delegation from the U.S. Department of State. That year, Doby came out of retirement and became one of the first Americans to play professional baseball in Japan's Nippon Professional Baseball league when he and Don Newcombe, a former teammate with the Newark Eagles, signed contracts with the Chunichi Dragons. Doby spent the season splitting his time between 1B (36 games) and RF (34 games) and batted .225 with 10 HR, 35 RBI, and 27 runs in 240 at bats. After the season, Doby returned to the U.S. in October and resumed his work as a liquor retailer.

== Managerial and executive appointments ==
After retiring as a player, Doby became a scout with the Montreal Expos in 1969 and served as a minor league instructor with the organization in 1970. He was batting coach under manager Gene Mauch from 1971 to 1973 and again in 1976. He managed various teams during five seasons of winter league baseball in Venezuela, including Águilas del Zulia during the 1970–71 winter season. Doby rejoined the Indians for the 1974 season as first base coach for manager Ken Aspromonte. When Aspromonte was fired after the 1974 season, the Indians named Frank Robinson the club's player-manager and baseball's first black manager.

After Robinson's hire as manager, Doby returned to work for the Expos. In 1976, Bill Veeck purchased the White Sox for a second time and hired Doby to be the team's batting coach. As a team, the White Sox finished the 1976 season with a .255 batting average, 586 runs scored and 73 home runs. By June 29, 1977, the team's average was .284, and had recorded 382 runs scored and 87 home runs. They finished the season fourth in team batting average (.278) and had 192 home runs and 844 runs scored as a team. After firing the White Sox's manager and former Doby teammate Bob Lemon, Veeck replaced him with Doby on June 30, 1978. At age 53, Doby became the second black manager in the majors after Robinson. "It's so nice to work for a man like Bill Veeck. You just work as hard as you can, and if the opportunity arises, you will certainly get the opportunity to fulfill your dreams", Doby said after being named White Sox manager.

To that point in the season, the White Sox had a 34–40 record. On July 1 in his first game as manager, the White Sox suffered a 10–0 loss to the Minnesota Twins but Doby won his second game, 8–5, the next day against the same team. The White Sox finished 71–90, including 37–50 under Doby, in what would be Doby's sole managerial role. Veeck hired player-manager Don Kessinger to succeed Doby after deciding not to re-hire Doby, although Kessinger resigned as manager in the second half of the 1979 season. After removing Doby from the manager's role and reassigning him to batting coach, the position Doby held before being named manager, Veeck said, "Larry will always have a role on this team in some capacity." He served in that role for one additional season and resigned in October 1979.

After retiring from baseball, Doby was named director of communications for the National Basketball Association's New Jersey Nets from 1980 to 1989 and also served as the Nets' director of community affairs until 1990. Doby was named special assistant to the AL's last president, Gene Budig, on April 17, 1995.

=== Managerial record ===
Team	Year	Regular season					Postseason			
Team	Year	Games	Won	Lost	Win %	Finish	Won	Lost	Win %	Result
CWS	1978	87	37	50	.425	5th in AL West	–	–	–	–
Total		87	37	50	.425		0	0	–	

== Second man ==
I was never bitter because I believed in the man upstairs. I continue to do my best. I let someone else be bitter. If I was bitter, I was only hurting me. I prefer to remember Bill Veeck and Jim Hegan and Joe Gordon, the good guys. There is no point in talking about the others.

— Larry Doby

The New York Times wrote, "In glorifying those who are first, the second is often forgotten ... Larry Doby integrated all those American League ball parks where Jackie Robinson never appeared. And he did it with class and clout." During the 1997 season, when the long-departed Jackie Robinson's number 42 was being retired throughout baseball, and the still-living Doby was being virtually ignored by the media, an editorial in Sports Illustrated pointed out that Doby had to suffer the same indignities that Robinson did, and with nowhere near the media attention and implicit support. Scoop Jackson in 2007 wrote, in response to the tradition of MLB players wearing jerseys in homage of Robinson, "Second place finishers in America are suckers. And so are those who make the story of history less simple than it needs to be. This happens sometimes in America. Those who don't come first or don't do things a certain way get lost. They disappear." In a 1978 interview, Doby said, "Jackie got all the publicity for putting up with it (racial slurs). But it was the same thing I had to deal with. He was first, but the crap I took was just as bad. Nobody said, 'We're gonna be nice to the second Black'".

Doby served as one of the pallbearers at Robinson's funeral. As fellow Hall of Famer Joe Morgan wrote, "Anyone who knew Larry knew that he admired Robinson and was never jealous of the attention Robinson received." Former teammate Al Rosen said:

Jackie was a college educated man who had been an officer in the service and who played at the Triple-A level. Jackie was brought in by Branch Rickey specifically to be the first black player in major league baseball. Larry Doby came up as a second baseman who didn't have time to get his full college education, and was forced to play a different position in his first major league season. I think, because of those circumstances, he had a more difficult time than Jackie Robinson. I don't think he has gotten the credit he deserves.

Doby experienced many prejudices during his time before, during, and after the majors. One incident took place during a game as Doby was sliding into second base when the shortstop from the opposing team spat tobacco juice on him. Doby called it the worst injustice he experienced on the field. He endured many racial slurs, from the stands and elsewhere, during games. He also received death threats. After he had retired as a player, Doby recalled memories of his days as a barrier-breaker. "You know why I hit so well in Washington and St. Louis? They were major Jim Crow seating parks and when I came to bat, I knew where the noise was coming from and who was making it. I felt like a quarterback with 5,000 cheerleaders calling his name. You know most of them couldn't afford to be there. I never forgot them."

Shortly after the Indians had honored Doby by naming a nearby street after him, The Plain Dealer columnist Bill Livingston wrote, "The Larry Doby way of pioneering was the same as the Jackie Robinson way in the National League, only Doby's debut occurred six short weeks later and with almost no advance preparation by Doby or the Indians." Doby threw out the ceremonial first pitch at the 1997 Major League Baseball All-Star Game, played at Jacobs Field. The decision to have the game in Cleveland coincided with the 1997 season marking the fiftieth anniversary of Robinson breaking baseball's color barrier. It was also 50 years and 3 days since Doby became the first black player in the American League.

== Hall of Fame ==
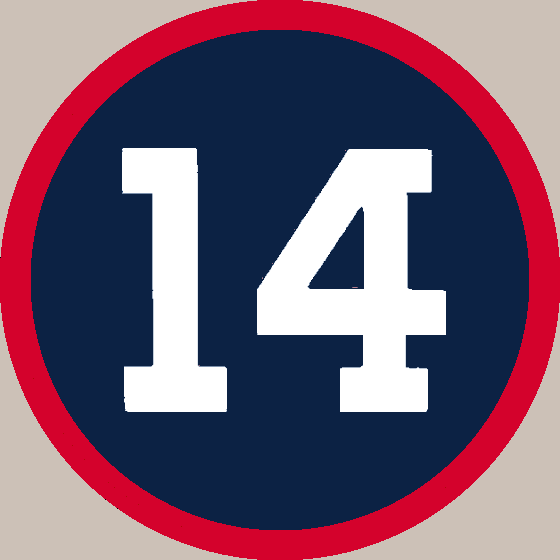
Larry Doby's number 14 was retired by the Cleveland Indians in 1994.

Doby was elected into the National Baseball Hall of Fame on March 3, 1998, by the Veterans Committee at the age of 74. "This is just a tremendous feeling. It's kind of like a bale of cotton has been on your shoulders, and now it's off", said Doby. When he received word about his election, it was by a telephone call from fellow Hall member Ted Williams. Upon hearing of Doby's election, Gene Mauch, said, "You have to be some kind of special person to go through what Larry and Jackie Robinson went through. They both are. I'm not too sure there's a player in the game today who could handle it."

He was inducted into the National Baseball Hall of Fame and Museum on July 26, 1998. Doby became the first member born in South Carolina elected to the Hall. Although he was the first to play in MLB, Doby was the last member elected to the Hall of the four players to ever play in both a Negro league and MLB World Series, the others being Satchel Paige, Monte Irvin, and Willie Mays.

== Death ==
Doby and his wife, Helyn, had five children, six grandchildren and four great-grandchildren. When the Dobys moved to Montclair, Yogi Berra and his wife became neighborhood friends and children of the two families played baseball and football together. Doby had a kidney removed in 1997 after a cancerous tumor was detected. Helyn, married to Doby for 55 years, died in 2001 after a six-month battle with cancer.

Doby died on June 18, 2003, at his home in Montclair, New Jersey, at age 79 after suffering from cancer. When Doby died, President George W. Bush made the following statement:

Larry Doby was a good and honorable man, and a tremendous athlete and manager. He had a profound influence on the game of baseball, and he will be missed. As the first African American player in the American League, he helped lead the Cleveland Indians to their last World Series title in 1948, became a nine-time All-Star and was voted into the Baseball Hall of Fame in 1998. Laura joins me in sending our condolences to Larry's family during this difficult time.

MLB Commissioner Bud Selig (1992–2015) released a statement a day following Doby's death:

Like Jackie, he endured the pain of being a pioneer with grace, dignity, and determination and eased the way for all who followed. He achieved another historic second 31 years later he became the second African-American to manage a big league club, following Frank Robinson.

Former MLB Commissioner Fay Vincent said:

Larry's role in history was recognized slowly and belatedly. Jackie Robinson, who broke the color line first but in the same year, quite naturally received most of the attention. Larry played out his career with dignity and then slid gracefully into various front-office positions in basketball and then later in baseball. Only in the 90's did baseball wake up to the obvious fact that Larry was every bit as deserving of recognition as Jackie.

== Honors and legacy ==
Long before Doby was inducted into the Baseball Hall of Fame came induction in the Indians Hall of Fame in August 1966. Later, in May 1973, he was inducted into the South Carolina Hall of Fame and in 2010, the New Jersey Hall of Fame. On August 10, 2007, the Indians paid tribute to Doby on Larry Doby Day by collectively using his number (14) on their uniforms. The franchise again honored him when in 2012, Eagle Avenue, next to the Indians' Progressive Field, was renamed "Larry Doby Way" in an on-field postgame ceremony. Among those present at the ceremony were former star pitcher Jim "Mudcat" Grant, Indians president Mark Shapiro, Cleveland mayor Frank Jackson, and various members of Doby's family. The Indians unveiled a life-sized bronze statue of Doby outside Progressive Field on July 25, 2015.

The South Carolina chapter of the Society for American Baseball Research, located in Aiken, South Carolina, is named after Doby, a native South Carolinian.

In 1997, Princeton University awarded Doby an honorary Doctorate of Humanities.

The city of Paterson, New Jersey, renamed the Eastside Park baseball field "Larry Doby Field" on June 1, 2002. The Yogi Berra Museum and Learning Center has a section named the Larry Doby Wing. Of Berra, Doby said, "Yogi was one of the first opposing players to talk to me. As a catcher, Yogi talked to everybody. I finally had to tell the umpire: 'Please tell him to shut up. He asked me how my family was back in the first inning.'"

In 2011, the U.S. Postal Service announced that Doby would be one of the four baseball players (along with Ted Williams, Joe DiMaggio, and Willie Stargell) to appear on a postage stamp in 2012, as part of its "Major League Baseball All-Stars" series. The stamp was released July 21, 2012.

In 2013, the Bob Feller Act of Valor Award honored Doby as one of 37 Baseball Hall of Fame members for his service in the United States Navy during World War II.

In 2022, the Garden State Parkway's Brookdale North Service Area in Bloomfield, New Jersey, was renamed the Larry Doby Service Area.

On December 23, 2023, on what would have been his 100th birthday, Doby was posthumously awarded a Congressional Gold Medal.

== See also ==
- List of Negro league baseball players
- List of first black Major League Baseball players
- List of Negro league baseball players who played in Major League Baseball
- List of Major League Baseball career home run leaders
- List of Major League Baseball players to hit for the cycle
- List of Major League Baseball annual runs batted in leaders
- List of Major League Baseball annual home run leaders
- List of Major League Baseball annual runs scored leaders
- List of people on stamps of the United States

Achievements
Preceded by Gus Bell	Hitting for the cycle June 4, 1952	Succeeded by Don Mueller
