= Leniel Hooker =

American baseball player

- Pitcher
- Born: June 28, 1919; Sanford, North Carolina, U.S.
- Died: December 18, 1977 (aged 58); Newark, New Jersey, U.S.
- Batted: Right Threw: Right

debut
- 1940, for the Newark Eagles

Last appearance
- 1951, for the Drummondville Cubs
- Stats at Baseball Reference

Teams
- Newark Eagles (1940–1948); Philadelphia Stars (1943); Farnham Pirates (1949); Drummondville Cubs (1949–1951)

Career highlights and awards
- Negro League World Series champion (1946)

Leniel Charlie Hooker (June 28, 1919 – December 18, 1977) was an American pitcher in Negro league baseball. He played from 1940 to 1951.
