= Max Manning =

American baseball player

- Pitcher
- Born: November 18, 1918; Rome, Georgia, U.S.
- Died: June 23, 2003 (aged 84); Pleasantville, New Jersey, U.S.
- Batted: Left Threw: Right

debut
- 1939, for the Newark Eagles

Last appearance
- 1948, for the Newark Eagles

Negro National League statistics
- Win–loss record: 37-18
- Run average: 4.36
- Strikeouts: 212

Teams
- Newark Eagles (1939–1942, 1946–1948)

Maxwell Cornelius Manning (November 18, 1918 – June 23, 2003), nicknamed Dr. Cyclops, was an American pitcher in Negro league baseball. He played for the Newark Eagles between 1938 and 1949.

Manning was born in Rome, Georgia. His father, Robert Manning, was a teacher, and moved his family amongst several locations including Mississippi, Philadelphia, and Pleasantville, New Jersey, where they settled. He served in the United States Army Air Forces during World War II. Beginning in 1937, he played collegiate basketball and baseball for Lincoln University, where he began a friendship with Monte Irvin. He left university in 1938 to pursue professional play. In the 1946 Negro World Series, he started two games and went 1–1 to help the Eagles win the championship.

Upon retirement in 1951, Manning resumed his studies at Glassboro State College in Glassboro, New Jersey, where he played for their baseball and basketball teams. After graduation, he taught sixth grade in Pleasantville for 28 years. He died in 2003, at age 84.

Manning appeared in a 2003 episode of the PBS series History Detectives, which featured an investigation into how a baseball field dedicated to fellow Negro league player John Henry Lloyd (better known as "Pop" Lloyd) came to be in Atlantic City, New Jersey during a period where racial discrimination was in force.
