= Monte Irvin =

American baseball player (1919–2016)

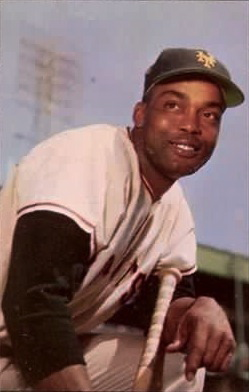
- Irvin with the New York Giants, c. 1953
- Left fielder
- Born: February 25, 1919; Haleburg, Alabama, U.S.
- Died: January 11, 2016 (aged 96); Houston, Texas, U.S.
- Batted: Right Threw: Right

Professional debut
- NgL: 1938, for the Newark Eagles
- MLB: July 8, 1949, for the New York Giants

Last MLB appearance
- September 30, 1956, for the Chicago Cubs

MLB statistics
- Batting average: .305
- Home runs: 139
- Runs batted in: 684
- Stats at Baseball Reference

Teams
- Newark Eagles (1938–1943, 1945–1948); New York Giants (1949–1955); Chicago Cubs (1956)

Career highlights and awards
- 4x NgL All-Star (1941, 1946–1948); MLB All-Star (1952); Negro World Series champion (1946); World Series champion (1954); 3× Negro National League batting champion (1940, 1941, 1946); NL RBI leader (1951); San Francisco Giants No. 20 retired

Member of the National

Baseball Hall of Fame
- Induction: 1973
- Election method: Negro Leagues Committee
Military career
Allegiance	United States
Branch	United States Army
Service years	1942–1945
Rank	Sergeant
Units	1313th Battalion
Conflicts	World War II

Monford Merrill "Monte" Irvin (February 25, 1919 – January 11, 2016) was an American left fielder and right fielder in the Negro leagues and Major League Baseball (MLB) who played with the Newark Eagles (1938–1942, 1946–1948), New York Giants (1949–1955) and Chicago Cubs (1956). He grew up in New Jersey and was a standout football player at Lincoln University. Irvin left Lincoln to spend several seasons in Negro league baseball. His career was interrupted by military service from 1943 to 1945.

When he joined the New York Giants, Irvin became one of the earliest African-American MLB players. He played in two World Series for the Giants. When future Hall of Famer Willie Mays joined the Giants in 1951, Irvin was asked to mentor him. He was inducted into the Baseball Hall of Fame in 1973. After his playing career, Irvin was a baseball scout and held an administrative role with the MLB commissioner's office.

At the time of his death, Irvin was the oldest living former Negro Leagues player, New York Giant and Chicago Cub. He lived in a retirement community in Houston before his death.

== Early life ==
Monford Merrill "Monte" Irvin was born on February 25, 1919, in Haleburg, Alabama, the eighth of 13 children, and brother of fellow Negro leaguer Cal Irvin. As a child, he moved with his family to Orange, New Jersey. At Orange High School, he starred in four sports, earning a total of 16 varsity letters and setting a state record in the javelin throw. Irvin played baseball for the Orange Triangles, the local semiprofessional team, and he credited its coach with giving him an activity that helped him to stay out of trouble. He was offered a football scholarship to the University of Michigan, but he had to turn it down because he did not have enough money to move to Ann Arbor.

== College career ==
Irvin attended Lincoln University and was a star football player. However, he had disagreements with his coach and he found that he could not remain on his athletic scholarship and pursue pre-dentistry studies. As his frustration mounted, Irvin began to be recruited by Negro league baseball teams.

== Professional career ==
=== Newark Eagles (1938–1943, 1945–1948) ===
Irvin played for the Newark Eagles of the Negro National League in 1938. Larry Doby, the first player to break the color barrier in the American League, was Irvin's double play partner with Newark at one time. After hitting for high batting averages of .422 and .396 (1940–41), Irvin asked for a raise before the 1942 season. When that was denied, he left the Negro leagues for the Mexican League, where he won a triple crown; he had a .397 batting average and 20 home runs in 63 games.

=== World War II ===
Following the 1942 Mexican League season, Irvin was drafted into military service. Joining the army's GS Engineers, 1313th Battalion, for the next three years, Irvin was deployed to England, France, and Belgium, and he served in the Battle of the Bulge. Irvin said that while many black soldiers had been treated badly by their white counterparts, the situation improved for black soldiers as many white soldiers realized the contradiction in an oppressed group being sent to Europe to fight for the oppressed people in other countries. Irvin's military service left him with ringing in the ears, which affected his coordination.

=== Return to baseball ===
After World War II, Irvin was approached by Brooklyn Dodgers executive Branch Rickey about being signed for the major leagues, but Irvin felt he was not ready to play at that level so soon after leaving the service. The Newark Eagles business manager, Effa Manley, would not let Rickey sign Irvin without compensation. Rickey had already obtained Jackie Robinson without paying for his rights to his Negro league clubs. Said Irvin,

... from a purely business standpoint, Mrs. Manley felt that Branch Rickey was obligated to compensate her for my contract. That position probably delayed my entry into the major leagues ... Mrs. Manley told Rickey that he had taken Don Newcombe for no money but she wasn't going to let him take me without some compensation. Furthermore, if he tried to do it, she would sue and fight him in court ... Rickey contacted her to say he was no longer interested and released me ... the Giants picked up my contract ...

Irvin earned MVP honors in the 1945–46 Puerto Rican Winter League. He returned to the Newark Eagles in 1946 to lead his team to a league pennant. Irvin won his second batting championship, hitting .401, and was instrumental in beating the Kansas City Monarchs in a seven-game Negro League World Series, batting .462 with three home runs. He was a five-time Negro League All-Star (1941, 1946–1948, including two games in 1946). He spent the winter of 1948–49 in Cuba.

=== New York Giants (1949–1955) ===
In 1949, the New York Giants paid $5,000 for Irvin's contract. He was one of the first black players to be signed, as Jackie Robinson had only broken the MLB color line in 1947. Assigned to Jersey City of the International League, Irvin batted .373. He debuted with the Giants on July 8, 1949, as a pinch hitter. Back with Jersey City in 1950, he was called up after hitting .510 with ten home runs in 18 games. Irvin batted .299 for the Giants that season, playing first base and the outfield.

In 1951, Irvin sparked the Giants' miraculous comeback to overtake the Dodgers in the pennant race, batting .312 with 24 homers and a league-best 121 runs batted in (RBI), en route to the World Series (he went 11–24 for .458). In the third game of the playoff between the Giants and Dodgers, Irvin popped out in the bottom of the ninth inning before Bobby Thomson hit the Shot Heard 'Round the World. That year Irvin teamed with Hank Thompson and Willie Mays to form the first all-black outfield in the majors. Later, he finished third in the NL's MVP voting.

During that season, Giants manager Leo Durocher asked Irvin to serve as a mentor for Mays, who had been called up to the team in May. Mays later said, "In my time, when I was coming up, you had to have some kind of guidance. And Monte was like my brother ... I couldn't go anywhere without him, especially on the road ... It was just a treat to be around him. I didn't understand life in New York until I met Monte. He knew everything about what was going on and he protected me dearly." Irvin later replied, "I did that for two years and in the third year he started showing me around."

Irvin suffered a broken ankle during a spring training game in Denver in 1952, jamming his ankle on third base while sliding. "It was a horrible thing to see," reported Mays. However, Irvin returned in time to be named to his only Major League Baseball All-Star Game in 1952. He appeared in only 46 games that season, hitting .310 with four home runs and 21 RBI. Irvin hit .329 with 21 home runs and 97 RBI in 1953, finishing 15th in the league MVP voting. The following season, he hit .262 with 19 home runs and 64 RBI, with the Giants winning the pennant and facing the Cleveland Indians in the 1954 World Series. Irvin was in left field when Mays, playing center field, made "The Catch" on a deep drive off the bat of Vic Wertz in Game 1. The Giants went on to win the Series in four games, with Irvin collecting two hits in nine at bats.

In 1955, Irvin had been sent down to the minor leagues, where he hit 14 home runs in 75 games for the Minneapolis Millers.

=== Chicago Cubs (1956) ===
The Chicago Cubs signed Irvin before the 1956 season. The team said that he would compete with Hank Sauer for a starting position in left field. Irvin appeared in 111 games for the Cubs that year, hitting .271 with 15 home runs.

A back injury led to Irvin's retirement as a player in 1957. He sustained the injury during spring training that year and only appeared in four minor league games for the Los Angeles Angels of the Pacific Coast League. In his major league career, Irvin batted .293, with 99 home runs, 443 RBI, 366 runs scored, 731 hits, 97 doubles, 31 triples, and 28 stolen bases, with 351 walks for a .383 on-base percentage, and 1187 total bases for a .475 slugging average in 764 games played. Defensively, Irvin recorded a .981 fielding percentage.

== Later life ==
Monte appeared on an episode of To Tell The Truth dated May 22, 1961, in which he impersonated a judo champion.

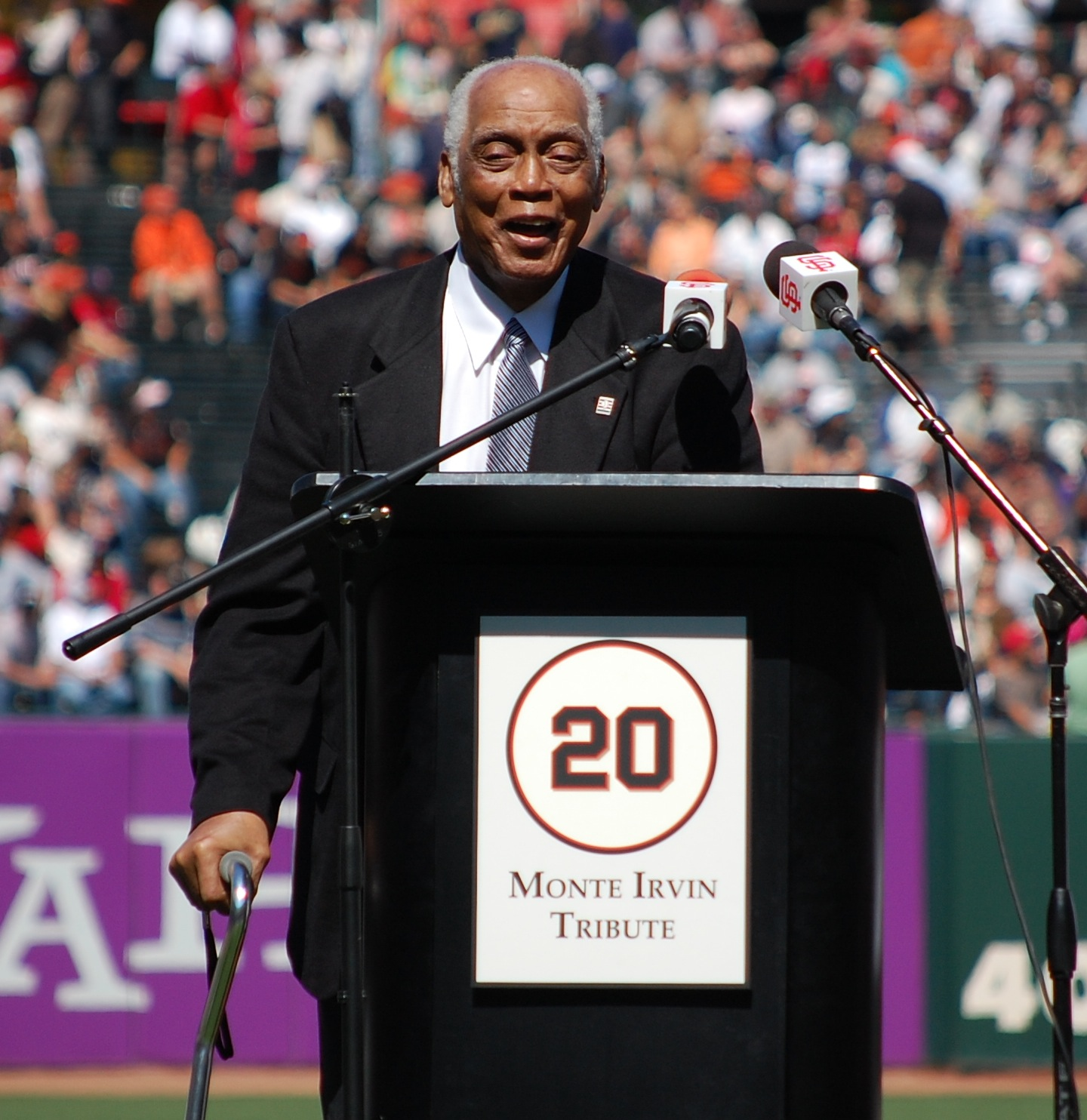
Irvin at his number retirement ceremony, 2010

After retiring, Irvin worked as a representative for the Rheingold beer company, and later as a scout for the New York Mets from 1967 to 1968. He was named an MLB public relations specialist for the commissioner's office under Bowie Kuhn in 1968. The appointment made him the first black executive in professional baseball. He was elected to the Mexican Professional Baseball Hall of Fame in 1972. The next year, he was inducted into the Baseball Hall of Fame, primarily on the basis of his play in the Negro leagues.

In 1974, Kuhn was present in Cincinnati when Hank Aaron tied Babe Ruth's record of 714 career home runs. When the team came back to Atlanta, Kuhn sent Irvin in his place, so Kuhn was not present for Aaron's 715th home run. Even as late as 1980, Aaron was so angry at Kuhn that he did not attend an event where Kuhn was to present him with an award.

Irvin stepped down from his role in the commissioner's office when Kuhn announced his retirement in 1984. He retired to Homosassa, Florida, but he accepted an MLB role involving special projects and appearances.

On May 16, 2006, Orange Park in the city of Orange, New Jersey was renamed Monte Irvin Park, in his honor.

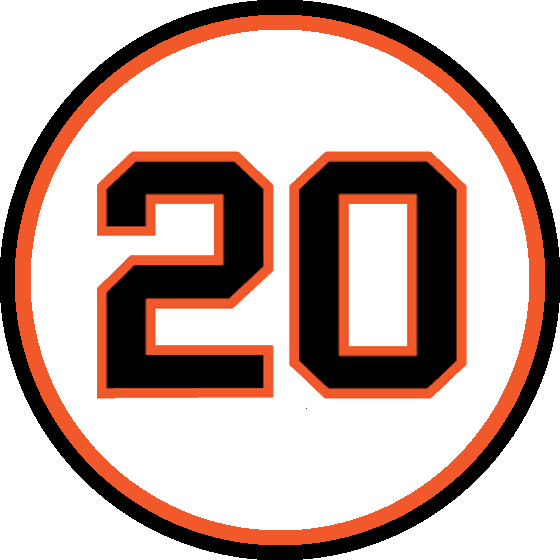
Monte Irvin's number 20 was retired by the San Francisco Giants in 2010.

On June 26, 2010, the San Francisco Giants officially retired his number 20 uniform. He was joined by fellow Hall of Famers Willie Mays, Willie McCovey, Juan Marichal, Gaylord Perry and Orlando Cepeda in the pre-game ceremony. He later joined those same Giants Hall of Famers in throwing out the ceremonial first pitch of Game 1 of 2010 World Series. In 2015, he was presented a 2014 World Series ring by Giants executives and later joined the Giants in visiting the White House.

In 2013, the Bob Feller Act of Valor Award honored Irvin as one of 37 Baseball Hall of Fame members for his service in the United States Army during World War II.

On January 11, 2016, Irvin died of natural causes in Houston at age 96. At the time of his death, Irvin was the oldest living African American to have played in the major leagues, as well as the oldest living member of a World Series-winning team. Before his death, he lived in a retirement community in Houston. He also served on the Veterans Committee of the Hall of Fame. The Giants wore a patch in his memory for the 2016 season, a black circle with an orange outline with "Monte" on top of his number 20, to be worn on the left sleeve.

On October 19, 2016, a life-sized bronze statue of Irvin was dedicated in Monte Irvin Park in Orange, New Jersey.

In 2021, Irvin was inducted into the New Jersey Hall of Fame.

== Career statistics ==
=== Negro leagues ===
The first official statistics for the Negro leagues were compiled as part of a statistical study sponsored by the National Baseball Hall of Fame and supervised by Larry Lester and Dick Clark, in which a research team collected statistics from thousands of box-scores of league-sanctioned games.

Link including Negro Leagues statistics officially entered into Major League Baseball's official records: https://www.mlb.com/player/monte-irvin-116403

The results from the first study were the statistics for Negro League Hall of Famers elected before 2006, which were published in Shades of Glory by Lawrence D. Hogan. These statistics include the official Negro league statistics for Monte Irvin, which may differ from Major League Baseball's official records:

Year	Team	G	AB	R	H	2B	3B	HR	RBI	SB	BB	BA	SLG
1938	Newark	2	4	0	0	0	0	0	0	0	0	.000	.000
1939	Newark	21	76	11	22	2	1	2	11	0	7	.289	.421
1940	Newark	35	131	26	46	9	4	3	36	2	12	.351	.550
1941	Newark	34	126	28	50	11	1	5	36	7	10	.397	.619
1942	Newark	4	18	7	11	3	1	1	11	0	0	.611	1.056
1945	Newark	1	5	0	1	0	0	0	1	0	0	.200	.200
1946	Newark – c	40	149	34	57	8	2	6	36	3	16	.383	.584
1947	Newark	13	48	13	16	1	0	4	10	1	8	.333	.604
1948	Newark	9	30	6	7	0	0	2	5	2	4	.233	.433
Total	9 seasons	159	587	125	210	34	9	23	146	15	57	.358	.564
c = pennant and Negro League World Series championship.

=== Mexican League ===
Year	Team	G	AB	R	H	2B	3B	HR	RBI	SB	BB	BA	SLG
1942	Veracruz	63	237	74	94	17	6	20*	79	11	50	.397*	.772
* – led league.

== See also ==
- List of first black Major League Baseball players
- List of Negro league baseball players who played in Major League Baseball
- List of Major League Baseball annual runs batted in leaders
