= Newark Eagles =

American professional Negro League baseball team (1936–1950)

Information
- League: Independent (1933); Negro National League (II) (1934–1948); Negro American League (1949–1951)
- Location: Newark, New Jersey
- Ballpark: General Electric Field (Bloomfield, New Jersey) (1934 Dodgers); Ollemar Stadium (Irvington, New Jersey) (1935 Dodgers); Ebbets Field (Brooklyn) (1935 Eagles); Ruppert Stadium (Newark) (1936–1948); Buffalo Stadium (Houston) (1949–1950)
- Established: 1933 (est. 1936 through merger)
- Disbanded: 1950
- Nicknames: Newark Dodgers* (1933–1935); Brooklyn Eagles* (1935); *merged 1935; Newark Eagles (1936–1948); Houston Eagles (1949–1950); New Orleans Eagles (1951)
- Negro World Series championships: 1946
- League titles: 1946

The Newark Eagles were a professional Negro league baseball team which played in the Negro National League from 1936 to 1948. They were owned by Abe and Effa Manley.

== History ==
=== Formation ===
The Newark Eagles were formed in 1936 when the Newark Dodgers, established in 1933, merged with the Brooklyn Eagles, established in 1935. Abe Manley and his wife Effa Manley, owners and founders of the Brooklyn Eagles, purchased the Newark Dodgers franchise and combined the teams' assets and player rosters. Charles Tyler, the previous owner of the Dodgers, signed the team over in exchange for cancellation of an approximately $500 debt that Tyler owed Abe Manley.

Team management was left to Effa, making the Eagles the third professional baseball team owned and operated by a woman. The first such team was the St. Louis Cardinals, which was owned by Helene Hathaway Britton from 1911 to 1917, and the second such team was the Indianapolis ABCs who were owned by Olivia Taylor from 1922 to 1926. The Eagles shared Ruppert Stadium with the minor league Newark Bears.

The Eagles were to (black) Newark what the Dodgers were to Brooklyn.

— Eagles star Max Manning

=== Decline and demise ===
After the close of the 1948 season, in the aftermath of Jackie Robinson's successful integration of Major League Baseball a year earlier, the Negro National League contracted and merged into the Negro American League. The Eagles were sold and moved to Houston, Texas for the 1949 season, where they became known as the Houston Eagles, part of the NAL's western division. Two years later they again relocated, this time to New Orleans. The New Orleans Eagles lasted one year before folding after the 1951 season.

== Negro World Series champions ==
Under Effa Manley's guidance, the 1946 team won the Negro World Series, upsetting the Kansas City Monarchs in a 7-game series.

== Players ==
=== Baseball Hall of Famers ===
Newark Eagles Hall of Famers
| Inductee | Position | Tenure | Inducted |
|---|---|---|---|
| Ray Dandridge | 3B | 1934–1938; 1942, 1944 | 1987 |
| Leon Day | P | 1937–1939; 1941–1943, 1946 | 1995 |
| Larry Doby | CF | 1942–1944; 1945–1947 | 1998 |
| Monte Irvin | LF | 1938–1942; 1945–1948 | 1973 |
| Biz Mackey | C | 1939–1942; 1945–1947 | 2006 |
| Mule Suttles | 1B | 1936–1940; 1942–1944) | 2006 |
| Willie Wells | SS | 1937–1939 | 1997 |
| Effa Manley | Owner | 1935–1948 | 2006 |

=== Notable alumni ===
- Don Newcombe (1944–1945) 4 x MLB All Star; 1949 Rookie of the year; 1956 Cy Young Award; 1956 NL Most Valuable Player
