= List of Kansas City Monarchs seasons =

This list of Kansas City Monarchs seasons compiles games played by the Kansas City Monarchs. For seasons when the Monarchs were league members or an associate team, only games that counted in official league standings are included. Seasons when they had no league membership and played an independent/barnstorming schedule include games against primarily major-league-caliber teams.

Contemporary coverage of games and standings was spotty and inconsistent. Ongoing research continuously discovers unreported or misreported games, while some games are probably lost forever. Therefore, Negro league seasonal finishes will likely remain incomplete and subjective.

== Year by year ==
Colored/Negro World Series Champions (1924–1927 & 1942–1948) ‡	League champions †	Other playoff ^

Season	Level	League	Season finish		Games	Wins	Loses	Ties	Win% (Note: Placement in annual standings were generally decided by win percentage; "games behind" were never used.)	Postseason	Ref
Season	Level	League	Full (Note: Finish in years when only a full season was indicates actual place in standings. Finish in years a split season was played indicates combined place in standings for both halves of the season.)	Split (Note: Years with a "—" did not play a split season. "1st" or 2nd" indicate which half of the season was won. "DNQ" indicates team did not win either half and did not qualify for postseason.)	Games	Wins	Loses	Ties	Win%	Postseason	Ref
Kansas City Monarchs
1920	Major	NNL1	3	—	79	44	33	2	.571		
1921	Major	NNL1	3	—	95	54	41	0	.568		
1922	Major	NNL1	2	—	80	47	31	2	.603		
1923†	Major	NNL1	1	—	86	54	32	0	.628	Won pennant outright	
1924‡	Major	NNL1	1	—	79	57	22	0	.722	Won Colored World Series (Hilldale Club) 5–4–1; Won pennant outright	
1925†	Major	NNL1	1	1st	84	59	23	2	.720	Lost Colored World Series (Hilldale Club) 5–1; Won NNL split-season playoff (St. Louis Stars^{2}) 5–3	
1926^	Major	NNL1	1	1st	82	60	22	0	.732	Lost NNL split-season playoff (Chicago American Giants^{2}) 5–4	
1927	Major	NNL1	3	DNQ	88	55	33	0	.625		
1928	Major	NNL1	2	DNQ	80	50	29	1	.633		
1929†	Major	NNL1	1	1st & 2nd	80	63	17	0	.788	Won pennant outright	
1930	Major	NNL1	2	DNQ	63	40	23	0	.635		
1931	Independent	—	—	—	19	10	9	0	.526		
1932	Independent	—	—	—	18	13	5	0	.722		
1933	Independent	—	—	—	6	4	2	0	.667		
1934	Independent	—	—	—	9	3	6	0	.333		
1935	Independent	—	—	—	16	8	6	2	.571		
1936	Independent	—	—	—	17	14	3	0	.824		
1937†	Major	NAL	1	1st	72	52	19	1	.732	Won NAL split-season playoff (Chicago American Giants^{2}) 5–1–1	
1938	Major	NAL	1	DNQ	73	45	27	1	.625		
1939†	Major	NAL	1	1st	71	46	25	0	.648	Won NAL split-season playoff (St. Louis Stars^{2}) 4–1	
1940†	Major	NAL	1	—	50	36	11	3	.766	Won pennant outright	
1941†	Major	NAL	1	—	48	31	16	1	.660	Won Pennant outright	
1942‡	Major	NAL	1	—	39	27	12	0	.692	Won Negro World Series (Washington Homestead Grays) 4–0; Won pennant outright	
1943	Major	NAL	1	DNQ	72	44	27	1	.620		
1944	Major	NAL	4	DNQ	87	39	48	0	.448		
1945	Major	NAL	3	DNQ	96	52	41	3	.559		
1946†	Major	NAL	1	1st & 2nd	81	60	19	2	.759	Lost Negro World Series (Newark Eagles) 4–3; Won pennant outright	
1947	Major	NAL	2	—	98	62	36	0	.633		
1948^	Major	NAL	2	2nd	104	67	34	3	.663	Lost NAL split-season playoff (Birmingham Black Barons^{1}) 4–3–1	
1949	Minor	NAL	1 (W)	—	91	54	37	0	.593	Kansas City lost key players to the Majors and did not participate in the post-season	
1950^	Minor	NAL	1 (W)	1st & 2nd	73	52	21	0	.712	No divisional playoff (Indianapolis Clowns^{E})	
1951^	Minor	NAL	1 (W)	—	70	42	28	0	.600	Lost NAL divisional playoff (Indianapolis Clowns^{E}) ?–?	
1952	Minor	NAL	4	DNQ	49	23	26	0	.469		
1953†	Minor	NAL	1	1st & 2nd	77	56	21	0	.727	Won pennant outright	
1954	Minor	NAL	6	DNQ	67	23	43	1	.348		
1955†	Minor	NAL	1	1st	15	11	4	0	.733	No second-half played; declared champion	
Kansas City Monarchs (based in Grand Rapids, Michigan)
1956	Minor	NAL	4	DNQ	15	6	9	0	.400		
1957†	Minor	NAL	1	—	43	34	9	0	.791	Won pennant outright	
1958^	Minor	NAL	1	1st	56	3	24	2	.556	No split-season playoff (Birmingham Black Barons^{2})	
1959	Minor	NAL	—	—							
1960	Minor	NAL	—	—							
1961	Minor	NAL	—	—							
1962	Minor	NAL	—	—							
1963	Independent	—	—	—							
1964	Independent	—	—	—							
1965	Independent	—	—	—							

Key
