= 1944 Kansas City Monarchs season =

1944 Kansas City Monarchs
- League: Negro American League
- Ballpark: Ruppert Stadium
- City: Kansas City, Missouri
- Record: 49–74 (.398)
- League place: 5th
- Managers: Frank Duncan

The 1944 Kansas City Monarchs baseball team represented the Kansas City Monarchs in the Negro American League (NAL) during the 1944 baseball season. The team compiled a 49–74 record (37–51 in NAL games) and finished in fifth place in the NAL.

Frank Duncan was the team's manager. Key players included:

- Second baseman Bonnie Serrell compiled a .321 batting average, a .493 slugging percentage, and a .374 on-base percentage.
- Left fielder Jim LaMarque compiled a .296 batting average a .444 slugging percentage, and a. 345 on-base percentage.
- Third baseman Herb Souell compiled a .284 batting average, a .360 slugging percentage, and a .344 on-base percentage.
- Pitcher Satchel Paige led the team with a 6–4 win–loss record with 105 strikeouts and a 1.01 earned run average (ERA).
- Pitcher Booker McDaniel also posted a strong season with a 6–4 record, 73 strikeouts, and a 1.55 ERA.

Other regular players for the 1944 Monarchs included left fielder Lee Moody (.249 batting average), first baseman Newt Allen (.264 batting average), shortstop Jesse Williams (.229 batting average), center fielder Mance Smith (.191 batting average), catcher Sammy Haynes (.188 batting average), right fielder Dave Harper (.325 batting average), and pitchers Jack Matchett (3-4, 4.32 ERA), Hilton Smith (2-5, 3.44 ERA), and Eddie Locke (3-1, 3.33 ERA).

== Standings ==
vs. Negro American League					vs. Major Black teams			
Negro American League	W	L	Pct.	GB	W	L	T	Pct.
Birmingham Black Barons	58	24	.707	—	71	42	0	.628
Cincinnati–Indianapolis Clowns	50	44	.532	14	59	54	1	.522
Cleveland Buckeyes	45	42	.517	15½	59	56	1	.513
Memphis Red Sox	54	64	.458	22	65	78	0	.455
Kansas City Monarchs	37	51	.420	24	49	74	0	.398
Chicago American Giants	35	53	.398	26	43	72	1	.375
