= 1945 Kansas City Monarchs season =

1945 Kansas City Monarchs
- League: Negro American League
- Ballpark: Ruppert Stadium
- City: Kansas City, Missouri
- Record: 62–48–4 (.561)
- League place: 2nd
- Managers: Frank Duncan

The 1945 Kansas City Monarchs baseball team represented the Kansas City Monarchs in the Negro American League (NAL) during the 1945 baseball season. The team compiled a 62–48–4 record (47–34–3 in NAL games) and finished in second place in the NAL.

Frank Duncan was the team's manager. Key players included:

- In his first season of professional baseball, shortstop Jackie Robinson, at age 26, led the team with a .376 batting average, a .586 slugging percentage, and a .443 on-base percentage.
- First baseman Lee Moody compiled a .330 batting average, a .410 slugging percentage, and a .357 on-base percentage.
- Second baseman Jesse Williams compiled a .300 batting average, a .400 slugging percentage, and a .375 on-base percentage.
- Pitcher Booker McDaniel compiled a 9-5 record with 117 strikeouts and a 3.18 earned run average (ERA).
- Pitcher Jim LaMarque compiled a 7-2 record with 71 strikeouts and a 3.15 ERA.

Other regular players for the 1945 Monarchs included center fielder Johnie Scott (.248 batting average), right fielder Walter Thomas (.305 batting average), third baseman Herb Souell (.314 batting average), second baseman Chico Renfroe (.247 batting average), catcher Sammy Haynes (.197 batting average), left fielder Eli Williams (.270 batting average), and pitchers Hilton Smith (6-4, 3.27 ERA) and Satchel Paige (4-4, 4.05 ERA).

== Standings ==
| vs. Negro American League | | | | | | vs. Major Black teams | | | |
| Negro American League | W | L | T | Pct. | GB | W | L | T | Pct. |
|---|---|---|---|---|---|---|---|---|---|
| Cleveland Buckeyes | 62 | 17 | 1 | .781 | — | 72 | 31 | 3 | .693 |
| Kansas City Monarchs | 47 | 34 | 3 | .577 | 16 | 62 | 48 | 4 | .561 |
| Birmingham Black Barons | 41 | 31 | 2 | .568 | 17½ | 62 | 48 | 3 | .562 |
| Chicago American Giants | 41 | 48 | 1 | .461 | 26 | 49 | 59 | 1 | .454 |
| Cincinnati–Indianapolis Clowns | 33 | 47 | 1 | .414 | 29½ | 41 | 67 | 1 | .381 |
| Memphis Red Sox | 17 | 64 | 2 | .217 | 46 | 31 | 73 | 2 | .302 |
