= 1943 Kansas City Monarchs season =

1943 Kansas City Monarchs
- League: Negro American League
- Ballpark: Ruppert Stadium
- City: Kansas City, Missouri
- Record: 52–40–3 (.563)
- League place: 1st
- Managers: Frank Duncan

The 1943 Kansas City Monarchs baseball team represented the Kansas City Monarchs in the Negro American League (NAL) during the 1943 baseball season. The team compiled a 52–40–3 record (36–23–1 in NAL games) and finished in first place in the NAL.

Frank Duncan was the team's manager. The team's key players included:

- Center fielder Willard Brown led the team with a .333 batting average, a .520 slugging percentage, a .382 on-base percentage with seven home runs and 33 RBIs. Brown was inducted into the Baseball Hall of Fame in 2006.
- First baseman Buck O'Neil tallied a .284 batting average, a .329 slugging percentage, and a .331 on-base percentage. O'Neil was inducted into the Baseball Hall of Fame in 2022.
- Pitcher Booker McDaniel compiled a 9-2 win-loss record and a 2.42 earned run average (ERA).
- Pitcher Satchel Paige compiled an 8–8 win-loss record with 91 strikeouts and a 2.91 ERA. Paige was inducted into the Baseball Hall of Fame in 1971.

Other regular players included third baseman Herb Souell (.250 batting average), second baseman Bonnie Serrell (.295 batting average), shortstop Jesse Williams (.250 batting average), left fielder Newt Allen (.224 batting average), right fielder Hank Thompson (.313 batting average), left fielder Willie Simms (.270 batting average), catcher Herb Barnhill (.241 batting average), and pitchers Jack Matchett (4-6, 4.50 ERA) and Hilton Smith (3-2, 2.55 ERA).

== Standings ==
vs. Negro American League						vs. Major Black teams			
Negro American League	W	L	T	Pct.	GB	W	L	T	Pct.
Kansas City Monarchs	36	23	1	.608	—	52	39	1	.571
Cleveland Buckeyes	39	27	2	.588	½	52	40	3	.563
^{(1)} Birmingham Black Barons	44	34	3	.562	1½	62	49	3	.557
^{(2)} Chicago American Giants	37	33	1	.528	4½	45	38	1	.542
Memphis Red Sox	32	51	4	.391	16	49	59	4	.455
Cincinnati Clowns	27	47	5	.373	16½	41	67	5	.385

^{(1)} First half champion ^{(2)} Second half champion
