= 1948 Kansas City Monarchs season =

1948 Kansas City Monarchs
- League: Negro American League
- Ballpark: Blues Stadium
- City: Kansas City, Missouri
- Record: 69–37–3 (.647)
- League place: 2nd
- Owners: J. L. Wilkinson, Tom Baird
- Managers: Frank Duncan

The 1948 Kansas City Monarchs baseball team represented the Kansas City Monarchs in the Negro American League (NAL) during the 1948 baseball season. The team compiled a 69–37–3 record (65–35–3 in NAL games), won the second-half NAL penant, and lost the NAL championship series to the Birmingham Black Barons.

Buck O'Neil was the team's manager. Key players included:

- Center fielder Willard Brown led the team with a .408 batting average, a .684 slugging percentage, a .477 on-base percentage, seven home runs, and 54 RBIs.
- Right fielder Hank Thompson compiled a .335 batting average, a .551 slugging percentage, and a .477 on-base percentage.
- Pitcher Jim LaMarque compiled a 9-4 win–loss record with 80 strikeouts and a 3.20 earned run average (ERA).

Other regular players included third baseman Herb Souell (.286 batting average), shortstop Gene Baker (.249 batting average), second baseman Curt Roberts (.243 batting average), catcher Earl Taborn (.297 batting average), left fielder Johnie Scott (.300 batting average), first baseman Buck O'Neil (.213 batting average), left fielder Elston Howard (.250 batting average), pitchers Hilton Smith (4-2, 4.38 ERA), Gene Collins (4-4, 4.18 ERA), and Ford Smith (4-2, 2.43 ERA).

== Standings ==
vs. Negro American League						vs. Major Black teams			
Negro American League	W	L	T	Pct.	GB	W	L	T	Pct.
^{(1)} Birmingham Black Barons	62	28	2	.685	—	67	40	3	.623
^{(2)} Kansas City Monarchs	65	35	3	.646	2	69	37	3	.647
Cleveland Buckeyes	47	53	3	.471	20	50	58	4	.464
Indianapolis Clowns	38	55	5	.413	25½	45	78	7	.373
Memphis Red Sox	42	63	4	.404	27½	49	69	4	.418
Chicago American Giants	35	55	1	.390	27	38	60	2	.390

^{(1)} First half champion ^{(2)} Second half champion
