= 1942 Kansas City Monarchs season =

1942 Kansas City Monarchs
- League: Negro American League
- Ballpark: Ruppert Stadium
- City: Kansas City, Missouri
- Record: 35–17 (.673)
- League place: 1st
- Managers: Frank Duncan

The 1942 Kansas City Monarchs baseball team represented the Kansas City Monarchs in the Negro American League (NAL) during the 1942 baseball season. The team compiled a 35–17 (.673) record, won the NAL pennant, and defeated the Homestead Grays in the 1942 Negro World Series.

The team featured three players who were later inducted into the Baseball Hall of Fame: center fielder Willard Brown; and pitchers Hilton Smith and Satchel Paige.

The team's leading batters were:

- Right fielder Ted Strong - .364 batting average, .561 slugging percentage, six home runs, 32 RBIs in 34 games
- Second baseman Bonnie Serrell - .360 batting average, .561 slugging percentage, 22 RBIs in 33 games
- Willard Brown - .338 batting average, .493 slugging percentage, four home runs, 26 RBIs in 35 games

The team's leading pitchers were Jack Matchett (5–1, 1.92 ERA) and Booker McDaniel (5–1, 2.44 ERA).
