= 1938 Kansas City Monarchs season =

1938 Kansas City Monarchs
- League: Negro American League
- Ballpark: Ruppert Stadium
- City: Kansas City, Missouri
- Record: 48–29–1 (.622)
- League place: 2nd
- Managers: Andy Cooper

The 1938 Kansas City Monarchs baseball team represented the Kansas City Monarchs in the Negro American League (NAL) during the 1938 baseball season. The team compiled a 48–29–1 (45–27–1) record and finished in second place in the NAL.

The team featured several players who were later inducted into the Baseball Hall of Fame, including:

- Manager/pitcher Andy Cooper compiled a 2-0 win–loss record with a 3.57 earned run average (ERA).
- First baseman Buck O'Neil with a .250 batting average, a .408 slugging percentage, and a .325 on-base percentage.
- Center fielder Willard Brown compiled a .344 batting average, a .594 slugging percentage and a .382 on-base percentage.
- Center fielder Turkey Stearnes compiled a .267 batting average, .417 slugging percentage, and .313 on-base percentage.
- Left fielder Bullet Rogan compiled a .214 batting average, a .250 slugging percentage, and a .290 on-base percentage.
- Pitcher Hilton Smith led the team with a 9-2 record with 88 strikeouts and a 2.08 ERA.

Other regular players included left fielder Henry Milton (.335 batting average), second baseman Newt Allen (.272 batting average), shortstop Mex Johnson (.228 batting average), third baseman Roosevelt Cox (.207 batting average), right fielder Ed Mayweather (.270 batting average), catcher Harry Else (.300 batting average), and pitchers Vet Barnes (5-3, 4.40 ERA), Floyd Kranson (4-2, 4.14 ERA), Frank Bradley (4-2, 3.57 ERA), and Johnny Markham (3-4, 3.51 ERA).

== Standings ==
vs. Negro American League						vs. Major Black teams			
Negro American League	W	L	T	Pct.	GB	W	L	T	Pct.
^{(1)} Memphis Red Sox	39	23	1	.627	1	40	35	1	.533
Kansas City Monarchs	45	27	1	.623	—	48	29	1	.622
Chicago American Giants	41	37	3	.525	7	42	39	3	.518
^{(2)} Atlanta Black Crackers	30	31	0	.492	9½	32	34	0	.485
Jacksonville Red Caps	14	16	1	.468	10	14	16	1	.468
Indianapolis ABCs	17	21	0	.447	11	17	21	0	.447
Birmingham Black Barons	13	44	0	.228	24½	13	48	0	.213

^{(1)} First half champion ^{(2)} Second half champion
