= 1937 Kansas City Monarchs season =

1937 Kansas City Monarchs
- League: Negro American League
- Ballpark: Ruppert Stadium
- City: Kansas City, Missouri
- Record: 51–22–1 (.696)
- League place: 1st
- Managers: Andy Cooper

The 1937 Kansas City Monarchs baseball team represented the Kansas City Monarchs in the Negro American League (NAL) during the 1937 baseball season. The team compiled a 51–22–1 (.696) record and won the NAL pennant.

The team featured four individuals who were later inducted into the Baseball Hall of Fame: manager/pitcher Andy Cooper, left fielder Willard Brown, and pitcher Hilton Smith.

The team's leading batters were:

- Willard Brown - .380 batting average, .680 slugging percentage, 10 home runs, 57 RBIs in 53 games
- Second baseman Newt Allen - .314 batting average in 51 games

The team's leading pitchers were Hilton Smith (11–4, 1.61 ERA), Vet Barnes (8–2, 2.27 ERA), and Johnny Markham (6–0, 4.43 ERA).

The 1937 Monarchs adjusted ERA+ of 194 is the highest ever by a Major League team in a season, with the record previously being held by the 1872 Boston Red Stockings, who had an ERA+ of 193.
