= 1940 Kansas City Monarchs season =

1940 Kansas City Monarchs
- League: Negro American League
- Ballpark: Ruppert Stadium
- City: Kansas City, Missouri
- Record: 31–15–2 (.667)
- League place: 1st
- Managers: Andy Cooper

The 1940 Kansas City Monarchs baseball team represented the Kansas City Monarchs in the Negro American League (NAL) during the 1940 baseball season. The team compiled a 31–15–2 (.667) record and won the NAL pennant.

The team featured three individuals who were later inducted into the Baseball Hall of Fame: manager Andy Cooper, center fielder Turkey Stearnes, and left fielder Willard Brown.

The team's leading batters were:

- Shortstop Jesse Williams - .368 batting average, 24 RBIs in 31 games
- Third baseman Herb Souell - .340 batting average
- Buck O'Neil - .307 batting average, .447 slugging percentage, 30 RBIs in 31 games

The team's leading pitchers were Jack Matchett (6–2, 2.58 ERA) and Frank Bradley (4–1, 2.38 ERA).
