= 1947 Kansas City Monarchs season =

1947 Kansas City Monarchs
- League: Negro American League
- Ballpark: Blues Staium
- City: Kansas City, Missouri
- Record: 66–47–1 (.583)
- League place: 2nd
- Owners: J. L. Wilkinson, Tom Baird
- Managers: Frank Duncan

The 1947 Kansas City Monarchs baseball team represented the Kansas City Monarchs in the Negro American League (NAL) during the 1947 baseball season. The team compiled a 66–47–1 record (54–32 in NAL games) and finished in second place in the NAL.

Frank Duncan was the team's manager. Key players included:

- Center fielder Willard Brown led the team with a .375 batting average, a .645 slugging percentage, and 64 RBIs, and ranked second on the team with a .421 on-base percentage.
- Shortstop Hank Thompson compiled a .335 batting average, a .578 slugging percentage, and a .413 on-base percentage.
- Third baseman Herb Souell compiled a .331 batting average, a .416 slugging percentage, and a .379 on-base percentage.
- Catcher Joe Greene compiled a .328 batting average, a .500 slugging percentage, a .469 on-base percentage.
- Pitcher Jim LaMarque compiled a 10-3 win-loss record with 80 strikeouts and a 3.39 earned run average (ERA).

== Standings ==
vs. Negro American League						vs. Major Black teams			
Negro American League	W	L	T	Pct.	GB	W	L	T	Pct.
Cleveland Buckeyes	57	19	0	.750	—	62	35	1	.638
Kansas City Monarchs	54	32	0	.628	8	66	47	1	.583
Birmingham Black Barons	49	41	0	.544	15	58	52	0	.527
Memphis Red Sox	43	54	2	.444	24½	49	65	3	.432
Cincinnati–Indianapolis Clowns	32	60	2	.351	33	40	73	2	.357
Chicago American Giants	29	58	0	.333	33½	36	67	0	.350
