= 1946 Kansas City Monarchs season =

1946 Kansas City Monarchs
- League: Negro American League
- Ballpark: Ruppert Stadium
- City: Kansas City, Missouri
- Record: 66–29–2 (.691)
- League place: 2nd
- Managers: Frank Duncan

The 1946 Kansas City Monarchs baseball team represented the Kansas City Monarchs in the Negro American League (NAL) during the 1946 baseball season. The team compiled a 66–29–2 record (56–19–2 in NAL games) and won the NAL championship.

Frank Duncan was the team's manager. Key players included:

- First baseman Lee Moody led the team with a .455 batting average, a .591 slugging percentage, and a .478 on-base percentage.
- Center fielder Willard Brown compiled a .331 batting average, a .552 slugging percentage, and a .362 on-base percentage.
- Right fielder Ted Strong compiled a .364 batting average, a .500 slugging percentage, and a .466 on-base percentage.
- Pitcher Satchel Paige compiled a 4-0 record and a 1.29 earned run average (ERA).
- Pitcher Jim LaMarque compiled a 4-5 record with 37 strikeouts and a 3.67 ERA.
- Pitcher Connie Johnson compiled a 5-4 record with 63 strikeouts and a 3.59 ERA.
- Pitcher Steve Wylie compiled a 5-2 record with 26 strikeouts and a 5.11 ERA.

== Standings ==
vs. Negro American League						vs. Major Black teams			
Negro American League	W	L	T	Pct.	GB	W	L	T	Pct.
Kansas City Monarchs	56	19	2	.740	—	66	29	2	.691
Birmingham Black Barons	39	33	1	.541	15½	51	39	3	.565
Cleveland Buckeyes	37	35	3	.513	17½	45	44	5	.505
Memphis Red Sox	40	50	3	.446	23½	46	62	5	.429
Cincinnati–Indianapolis Clowns	35	44	1	.444	23	38	56	2	.406
Chicago American Giants	35	61	2	.367	31½	40	68	3	.374
