= 1941 Kansas City Monarchs season =

Baseball team

1941 Kansas City Monarchs
- League: Negro American League
- Ballpark: Ruppert Stadium
- City: Kansas City, Missouri
- Record: 34–13 (.723)
- League place: 1st
- Managers: Newt Allen

The 1941 Kansas City Monarchs baseball team represented the Kansas City Monarchs in the Negro American League (NAL) during the 1941 baseball season. The team compiled a 34–13 (.723) record and won the NAL pennant.

The team featured three players who were later inducted into the Baseball Hall of Fame: center fielder Willard Brown; and pitchers Hilton Smith and Satchel Paige.

The team's leading batters were:

- Willard Brown- .328 batting average, .555 slugging percentage, five home runs, 29 RBIs in 33 games
- Right fielder Ted Strong - .327 batting average, 602 slugging percentage, six home runs, 27 RBIs in 30 games

The team's leading pitchers were Hilton Smith (10–0, 1.53 ERA) and Satchel Paige (5–0, 2.35 ERA).
