= 1926 Kansas City Monarchs season =

1926 Kansas City Monarchs
- League: Negro American League
- Ballpark: Muehlebach Field
- City: Kansas City, Missouri
- Record: 60–22 (.732)
- League place: 5th
- Owners: J. L. Wilkinson
- Managers: Bullet Rogan

The 1926 Kansas City Monarchs baseball team represented the Kansas City Monarchs in the Negro National League (NNL) during the 1926 baseball season. The team compiled a 60–22 record (.732) and won the first-half championship in the NNL.

Bullet Rogan was the team's manager. Key players included:

- Center fielder Cristóbal Torriente led the team with a .351 batting average, a .511 slugging percentage, a .446 on-base percentage, five home runs, and 65 RBIs.
- Left fielder Wade Johnston compiled a .308 batting average, a .413 slugging percentage, and a .374 on-base percentage.
- Third baseman Newt Joseph compiled a .295 batting average, a .457 slugging percentage, and a .391 on-base percentage.
- Pitcher William Bell compiled a 15-6 win-loss record with 68 strikeouts, and a 2.39 earned run average (ERA).
- Pitcher Chet Brewer compiled a 12-1 record with 78 strikeouts and a 2.45 ERA.

Other regular players for the 1926 Monarchs included shortstop Newt Allen (.248 batting average), second baseman Dink Mothell (.296 batting average), first baseman Lemuel Hawkins (.268 batting average), right fielder Hurley McNair (.297 batting average), catcher Frank Duncan (.283 batting average), and pitchers Bullet Rogan (12-3, 2.86 ERA), Nelson Dean (7-4, 3.86 ERA) and Cliff Bell (5-4, 4.01 ERA).

== Standings ==
vs. Negro National League						vs. Major Black teams			
Negro National League	W	L	T	Pct.	GB	W	L	T	Pct.
^{(1)} Kansas City Monarchs	60	22	0	.732	—	60	22	0	.732
^{(2)} Chicago American Giants	56	24	2	.695	3	57	24	3	.696
St. Louis Stars	56	32	1	.635	7	61	35	2	.633
Detroit Stars	52	45	1	.536	15½	52	47	1	.525
Indianapolis ABCs	38	47	1	.448	23½	40	50	1	.445
Cuban Stars (West)	19	49	0	.279	34	19	49	0	.279
Cleveland Elites†	8	40	1	.173	35	8	41	1	.170
Dayton Marcos§	6	36	0	.143	34	6	36	0	.143

^{(1)} First half champion ^{(2)} Second half champion
†Cleveland folds mid-season before the conclusion of the season.
§Dayton departs mid-season as an independent team, before the conclusion of the season.
