= 1939 Kansas City Monarchs season =

1939 Kansas City Monarchs
- League: Negro American League
- Ballpark: Ruppert Stadium
- City: Kansas City, Missouri
- Record: 42–25 (.627)
- League place: 1st
- Managers: Andy Cooper

The 1939 Kansas City Monarchs baseball team represented the Kansas City Monarchs in the Negro American League (NAL) during the 1939 baseball season. The team compiled a 42–25 (.627) record and won the NAL pennant.

The team featured three individuals who were later inducted into the Baseball Hall of Fame: manager/pitcher Andy Cooper, center fielder Turkey Stearnes, and left fielder Willard Brown.

The team's leading batters were:

- Willard Brown - .368 batting average, .586 slugging percentage, 42 RBIs in 44 games
- Turkey Stearnes - .330 batting average, 503 slugging percentage, and 39 RBIs in 49 games
- Shortstop Ted Strong - .314 batting average

The team's leading pitchers were George Walker (8–1, 1.99 ERA) and Frank Bradley (7–4, 2.75 ERA).
