= 2001 Baseball Hall of Fame balloting =

Elections to the Baseball Hall of Fame

National Baseball

Hall of Fame and Museum
- New inductees: 4
- via BBWAA: 2
- via Veterans Committee: 2
- Total inductees: 253
- Induction date: August 5, 2001

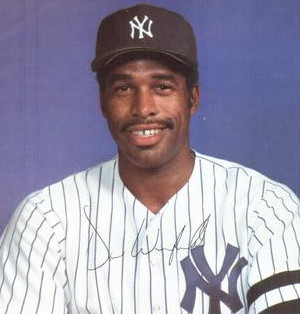
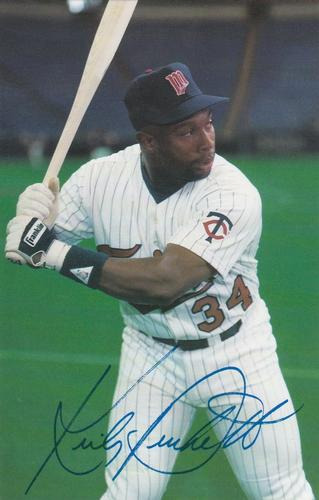
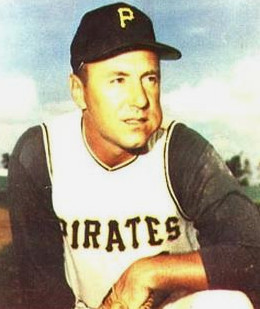
2001 inductees (L-R): Dave Winfield, Kirby Puckett, and Bill Mazeroski. Hilton Smith was also inducted.

Elections to the Baseball Hall of Fame for 2001 followed the system in use since 1995. The Baseball Writers' Association of America (BBWAA) voted by mail to select from recent major league players and elected two: Kirby Puckett and Dave Winfield. The Veterans Committee met in closed sessions and selected two people from multiple classified ballots: Bill Mazeroski and Hilton Smith.

Induction ceremonies in Cooperstown, New York, were held August 5 with Commissioner Bud Selig presiding.

== BBWAA election ==
The BBWAA was authorized to elect players active in 1981 or later, but not after 1995; the ballot included candidates from the 2000 ballot who received at least 5% of the vote but were not elected, along with selected players, chosen by a screening committee, whose last appearance was in 1995. All 10-year members of the BBWAA were eligible to vote.

Voters were instructed to cast votes for up to 10 candidates; any candidate receiving votes on at least 75% of the ballots would be honored with induction to the Hall. Results of the 2001 election by the BBWAA were announced on January 16, 2001. The ballot consisted of 32 players; 515 ballots were cast, with 387 votes required for election. A total of 3258 individual votes were cast, an average of 6.33 per ballot. Those candidates receiving less than 5% of the vote (25 votes) would not appear on future BBWAA ballots, and under then-current rules were also eliminated from future consideration by the Veterans Committee. A change in Hall policy later in 2001 restored the eligibility of players dropped from BBWAA balloting for Veterans Committee consideration.

Candidates who were eligible for the first time are indicated with a dagger (†). The two candidates who received at least 75% of the vote and were elected are indicated in bold italics; candidates who have since been selected in subsequent elections are indicated in italics. The 13 candidates who received less than 5% of the vote, thus becoming ineligible for future BBWAA consideration, are indicated with an asterisk (*).

José Rijo, who received only one vote, resumed his major league career in 2001-2002; he again became eligible on the 2008 ballot.

Both selections, Kirby Puckett of the Minnesota Twins and Dave Winfield of the New York Yankees, were late-1980s/early-1990s star hitters. Puckett is best known for leading the Twins to the World Championship before being forced to retire due to glaucoma.

Player	Votes	Percent	Change	Year
**Dave Winfield**†	**435**	**84.5**	-	1st
**Kirby Puckett**†	**423**	**82.1**	-	1st
Gary Carter	334	64.9	▲15.2%	4th
Jim Rice	298	57.9	▲6.4%	7th
Bruce Sutter	245	47.6	▲9.1%	8th
Goose Gossage	228	44.3	▲11.0%	2nd
Steve Garvey	176	34.2	▲2.1%	9th
Tommy John	146	28.3	▲1.2%	7th
Don Mattingly†	145	28.2	-	1st
Jim Kaat	135	26.2	▲1.1%	13th
Bert Blyleven	121	23.5	▲6.1%	4th
Jack Morris	101	19.6	▼2.6%	2nd
Dale Murphy	93	18.1	▼5.1%	3rd
Dave Parker	84	16.3	▼4.5%	5th
Dave Concepción	74	14.4	▲1.0%	8th
Luis Tiant	63	12.2	▼5.0%	14th
Keith Hernandez	41	8.0	▼2.4%	6th
Dave Stewart†	38	7.4	-	1st
Ron Guidry	27	5.2	▼3.6%	8th
Lou Whitaker†*	15	2.9	-	1st
Kirk Gibson†*	13	2.5	-	1st
Lance Parrish†*	9	1.7	-	1st
Tom Henke†*	6	1.2	-	1st
Dave Righetti†*	2	0.4	-	1st
Steve Bedrosian†*	1	0.2	-	1st
Tom Browning†*	1	0.2	-	1st
Ron Darling†*	1	0.2	-	1st
Jim Deshaies†*	1	0.2	-	1st
John Kruk†*	1	0.2	-	1st
José Rijo†*	1	0.2	-	1st
Howard Johnson†*	0	0.0	-	1st
Andy Van Slyke†*	0	0.0	-	1st

Key
	Elected to the Hall of Fame on this ballot (named in **bold italics**).
	Elected subsequently, as of 2025 (named in plain italics).
	Renominated for the 2002 BBWAA election by adequate performance on this ballot and has not been elected, as of 2025.
	Eliminated from annual BBWAA consideration by poor performance or expiration on this ballot and has not been elected, as of 2025.
†	First time on the BBWAA ballot.
*	Eliminated from annual BBWAA consideration by poor performance or expiration on this ballot.

The newly-eligible candidates included 21 All-Stars, five of whom were not on the ballot, representing a total of 65 All-Star selections. Among the new candidates were 12-time All-Star Dave Winfield, 10-time All-Star Kirby Puckett, 8-time All-Star Lance Parrish, 6-time All-Star Don Mattingly and 5-time All-Star Lou Whitaker. The field also included 2 MVPs (Mattingly and Kirk Gibson), 2 Rookies of the Year (Whitaker and Dave Righetti), and one Cy Young Award winner (Steve Bedrosian).

Players eligible for the first time who were not included on the ballot were: Scott Bankhead, Kevin Bass, Bud Black, Jerry Browne, Steve Buechele, Danny Cox, José DeLeón, Scott Fletcher, Tom Foley, Jim Gott, Atlee Hammaker, Brian Harper, Greg A. Harris, Billy Hatcher, Dwayne Henry, Tim Hulett, Chris James, Bill Krueger, Mike LaValliere, Manuel Lee, Candy Maldonado, Mike Moore, Rob Murphy, Matt Nokes, José Oquendo, Spike Owen, Mike Pagliarulo, Gerald Perry, Dennis Rasmussen, Randy Ready, Franklin Stubbs, Mitch Webster, and Bill Wegman.

== Veterans Committee ==
This was the final meeting of the Committee on Veterans established by the Hall of Fame in 1953. It met in closed sessions, as always, to elect as many as two executives, managers, umpires, and older major league players—the categories considered in all of its meetings.

The older players eligible were those with ten major league seasons beginning 1946 or earlier; those who received at least 100 votes from the BBWAA in some election up to 1992; and those who received at least 60% support in some election beginning 1993. Players on Major League Baseball's ineligible list were also ineligible for election.

By an arrangement since 1995 the committee separately considered candidates from the Negro leagues and from the 19th century with authority to select one from each of those two special ballots. It elected two people, second baseman Bill Mazeroski from the 1960s and pitcher Hilton Smith from the Negro leagues.

The Board of Directors reformed the system radically with new rules enacted in August. Formerly 15 members appointed to limited terms, the new Veterans Committee would comprise all living members of the Hall and recipients of the Spink and Frick awards to writers and broadcasters. In particular the new members were 61 living Hall of Famers, 13 living recipients of the J. G. Taylor Spink Award, 13 living recipients of the Ford C. Frick Award, and three members of the previous committee whose terms had not yet expired.

Elections for players retired more than 20 years would be held every other year and elections for (managers, umpires and executives) would be held every fourth year. The first cycle for both categories would be in 2002 and 2003 for induction in 2003.

== J. G. Taylor Spink Award ==
Ross Newhan received the J. G. Taylor Spink Award honoring a baseball writer. (The award was voted at the December 2000 meeting of the BBWAA, dated 2000, and included in the summer 2001 ceremonies.)

== Ford C. Frick Award ==
Felo Ramírez received the Ford C. Frick Award honoring a baseball broadcaster.
