= Charro Park =

Baseball venue in Brownsville, Texas, US

Coordinates: 25.919560°N 97.499267°W

Charro Park is a baseball venue in Brownsville, Texas, on the campus of St. Joseph's Academy. The ballpark once hosted a game between the Kansas City Monarchs and the Brownsville Merchants in 1946. The Brownsville Tigers, a semi-pro team, once played their games at Charro Park.
