= 1924 Kansas City Monarchs season =

1924 Kansas City Monarchs
- League: Negro National League
- Ballpark: Muehlebach Field
- City: Kansas City, Missouri
- Record: 57–22 (.722)
- League place: 1st
- Managers: Bullet Rogan

The 1924 Kansas City Monarchs baseball team competed in the Negro National League during the 1924 baseball season. The Monarchs compiled a 57–22 (.722) record and won the Negro National League championship. The team played its home games at Muehlebach Field in Kansas City, Missouri.

The team's leading batters were:

- Pitcher/center fielder Bullet Rogan - .396 batting average, .617 slugging percentage, five home runs, 33 RBIs in 49 games (Rogan was later inducted into the Baseball Hall of Fame)
- Third baseman Newt Joseph - .375 batting average, .543 slugging percentage, four home runs, 68 RBIS in 71 games
- Left fielder Heavy Johnson - .366 batting average, .543 slugging percentage, five home runs, 44 RBIs in 70 games
- Shortstop Dobie Moore - .355 batting average, .545 slugging percentage, five home runs, 62 RBIs in 75 games
- Right fielder Hurley McNair - .339 batting average, 467 slugging percentage, five home runs, 59 RBIs in 71 games

The team's leading pitchers were Bullet Rogan (16–5, 3.14 ERA, 101 strikeouts in 175 innings pithed) and William Bell (9–2, 3.75 ERA).
