= Eli Williams (baseball) =

American baseball player (1916–2003)

- Outfielder
- Born: November 8, 1916; Union Springs, Alabama, U.S.
- Died: October 26, 2003 (aged 86); Miami, Florida, U.S.

Negro league baseball debut
- 1943, for the Harrisburg–St. Louis Stars

Last appearance
- 1945, for the Kansas City Monarchs

Teams
- Harrisburg–St. Louis Stars (1943); Kansas City Monarchs (1945)

Elijah Williams (November 8, 1916 – October 26, 2003), nicknamed "Eddie", was an American Negro league outfielder who played in the 1940s.

A native of Union Springs, Alabama, Williams made his Negro leagues debut in 1943 with the Harrisburg–St. Louis Stars. He went on to play for the Kansas City Monarchs in 1945. Williams died in Miami, Florida in 2003 at age 86.
