= Mance Smith =

American baseball player

- Outfielder
- Batted: Right Threw: Right

Negro league baseball debut
- 1944, for the Kansas City Monarchs

Last appearance
- 1944, for the Kansas City Monarchs
- Stats at Baseball Reference

Teams
- Kansas City Monarchs (1944)

Monroe "Mance" Smith is an American former Negro league outfielder who played in the 1940s.

Smith played for the Kansas City Monarchs in 1944. In 23 recorded games, he posted 15 hits and eight RBI in 83 plate appearances.
