= 1937 Cincinnati Tigers season =

1937 Cincinnati Tigers
- League: Negro American League
- Ballpark: Crosley Field
- City: Cincinnati, Ohio
- Owners: DeHart Hubbard
- Managers: Ted Radcliffe

The 1937 Cincinnati Tigers season was their first season playing baseball in the new Negro American League, also in its first season. The Tigers were previously members of the Negro Southern League and the integrated Indiana-Ohio League. In early October 1936, a "Negro Western League" was established with the Tigers as charter members. The Tigers finished the season with a 44-36 record, good for second place in the league.
