= Barney Serrell =

American baseball player (1920–1996)

- Second baseman
- Born: March 9, 1920; Natchez, Louisiana, U.S.
- Died: August 15, 1996 (aged 76); Santa Clara, California, U.S.
- Batted: Left Threw: Right

Negro leagues debut
- 1941, for the Chicago American Giants

Last Negro leagues appearance
- 1945, for the Kansas City Monarchs

Negro leagues statistics
- Batting average: .313
- Home runs: 8
- Runs batted in: 75
- Stats at Baseball Reference

Teams
- Chicago American Giants (1941); Kansas City Monarchs (1942–1945)

Career highlights and awards
- East-West All-Star Game (1944)

Member of the Mexican Professional

Baseball Hall of Fame
- Induction: 2020

Barney Clinton "El Grillo" Serrell (March 9, 1920 – August 15, 1996) was an American professional baseball second baseman in the Negro leagues and the Mexican League. He played from 1941 to 1957 with several teams. He is also listed as William C. Serrell and Bonnie Serrell.

Serrell started his Negro league career with the Chicago American Giants, playing one game and going 1-for-4. He then moved to the Kansas City Monarchs, where he played for four seasons. In 1942, he finished second in the batting title race of the Negro American League, batting .360, which was only beaten out by Ted Strong, his teammate (.364). He led the league in triples with five. In the 1942 Negro World Series against the Homestead Grays, he batted .412 with five runs batted in in the series win. He batted .287 in 53 games in 1943 while leading the league in doubles and triples. In 1944, he made his one East-West All-Star Game while batting .355 in 28 games while leading in runs (twenty), home runs (two), and runs batted in (eighteen). In 1945, he played in three games and had just two hits before he was released.

In 2020, Serrell was inducted into the Mexican Professional Baseball Hall of Fame.
