= Johnie Scott =

American baseball player

- Outfielder
- Born: August 28, 1913; Magnolia, Arkansas, U.S.
- Died: March 7, 1967 (aged 53); Los Angeles, California, U.S.
- Batted: Left Threw: Left

Negro league baseball debut
- 1944, for the Birmingham Black Barons

Last appearance
- 1948, for the Kansas City Monarchs

Teams
- Birmingham Black Barons (1944); Kansas City Monarchs (1944–1948)

Johnie Scott (August 28, 1913 – March 7, 1967) was an American Negro league baseball outfielder in the 1940s.

A native of Magnolia, Arkansas, Scott made his Negro leagues debut in 1944 for the Birmingham Black Barons. He went on to play five seasons with the Kansas City Monarchs, where he was a teammate of Baseball Hall of Famer Jackie Robinson in 1945, and represented Kansas City in the 1946 East–West All-Star Game. Scott died in Los Angeles, California in 1967 at age 53.
