= Sammy Haynes =

American baseball player

- Catcher
- Born: May 29, 1920; Atlanta, Georgia, US
- Died: November 11, 1997 (aged 77); Los Angeles, California, US
- Batted: Right Threw: Right

Negro league baseball debut
- 1939, for the Atlanta Black Crackers

Last appearance
- 1947, for the Atlanta Black Crackers
- Stats at Baseball Reference

Teams
- Atlanta Black Crackers (1939–1942); Kansas City Monarchs (1943–1945); Atlanta Black Crackers (1946–1947)

Sammy Haynes (May 29, 1920 – November 11, 1997) was an American Negro league catcher in the 1930s and 1940s.

A native of Atlanta, Georgia, Haynes made his Negro leagues debut in 1939 with the Atlanta Black Crackers. From 1943 to 1945, he played for the Kansas City Monarchs, where he was a teammate of Baseball Hall of Famer Jackie Robinson in the 1945 season. After his time in Kansas City, Haynes went on to manage the newly reorganized Atlanta Black Crackers.

Haynes lost his sight later in life, and subsequently founded a charity to help needy ex-athletes. He died in Los Angeles, California in 1997 at age 77.
