= Jesse Williams (shortstop) =

American baseball player

- Shortstop
- Born: June 22, 1913; Henderson, Texas, U.S.
- Died: February 27, 1990 (aged 76); Kansas City, Missouri, U.S.
- Batted: Right Threw: Right

Negro league baseball debut
- 1939, for the Kansas City Monarchs

Last appearance
- 1950, for the Indianapolis Clowns
- Stats at Baseball Reference

Teams
- Kansas City Monarchs (1939–1947); Indianapolis Clowns (1948–1950)

Jesse Horace Williams (June 22, 1913 – February 27, 1990), nicknamed "Bill", was an American Negro league shortstop for the Kansas City Monarchs and Indianapolis Clowns between 1939 and 1950.

A native of Henderson, Texas, Williams batted .471 for the Monarchs in the 1942 Negro World Series, and was selected to play in the East–West All-Star Game in 1943 and 1945. He served in the US Army during World War II. After his Negro league career, he played for the Tecolotes de Nuevo Laredo in 1951, the Vancouver Capilanos in 1952, and the Beaumont Exporters in 1954.

Williams died in Kansas City, Missouri in 1990 at age 76.
