= 1942 Negro World Series =

Team (Wins)	Manager(s)
Kansas City Monarchs (4)	Frank Duncan
Homestead Grays (0)	Vic Harris
- Dates: September 8–29
- Venue(s): Washington: Griffith Stadium (1); Pittsburgh: Forbes Field (2); New York: Yankee Stadium (3); Philadelphia: Shibe Park (4)
- Hall of Famers: Kansas City: Willard Brown, Buck O'Neil, Satchel Paige, Hilton Smith; Homestead: Ray Brown, Josh Gibson, Buck Leonard, Jud Wilson

The 1942 Negro World Series was a best-of-seven match-up between the Negro American League champion Kansas City Monarchs and the Negro National League champion Washington-Homestead Grays. In a six-game series, the Monarchs swept the Grays four games to none, with two additional games not counted in the standings. The Monarchs actually won the 1942 series 5-1, but a second game played in Yankee Stadium on September 13 (a seven-inning victory by the Monarchs) was not counted by prior agreement, and the only game played in Kansas City was thrown out on appeal when the Grays used unauthorized players from other NNL teams.

It was the first World Series between eastern and western Negro leagues champions since 1927, resuming after a 14-year lapse since the collapse of the Eastern Colored League had ended the previous post-season meetings. The series featured eight members of the Baseball Hall of Fame, four each from the Monarchs (Satchel Paige, Hilton Smith, Buck O'Neil, and Willard Brown) and the Grays (Josh Gibson, Jud Wilson, Ray Brown, and Buck Leonard). One additional Hall of Famer, Leon Day, played in one of the games that was not counted, Monarchs legend Bullet Rogan umpired in that same game.

The Monarchs and Grays had met during the regular season in two exhibition games, in which the Grays had twice defeated Monarch ace Satchel Paige in extra innings. Some of the pre-Series publicity had concentrated on whether Paige would be seeking revenge for his losses or whether the Grays truly held a "jinx" over him and would continue to dominate him. Paige pitched in all four official games and earned one victory and one save in a series that saw four official games, an exhibition game, and a game called due to protest.

This was the Grays' first appearance ever in the Negro World Series, though this was their third consecutive NNL pennant, and fifth in six seasons. They would appear in the next three CWS, winning in 1943 and '44. It was the third appearance by the Monarchs (going back to 1924) in the CWS, their second championship, and their fifth NAL pennant in six seasons. They would appear one more time, losing to the Newark Eagles in 1946.

== Summary ==
Kansas City won the series, 4–0.

Game	Date	Score	Location	Time	Attendance
1	September 8	Kansas City Monarchs – 8, Homestead Grays – 0	Griffith Stadium	N/A	22,129
2	September 10	Kansas City Monarchs – 8, Homestead Grays – 4	Forbes Field	N/A	5,219
3	September 13	Kansas City Monarchs – 9, Homestead Grays – 3	Yankee Stadium	N/A	25,290
4	September 29	Kansas City Monarchs – 9, Homestead Grays – 5	Shibe Park	N/A	14,029

Managers: Frank Duncan (Kansas City); Vic Harris (Washington-Homestead)

== Matchups ==
=== Game One ===
September 8, 1942, at Griffith Stadium in Washington, DC

Team	1	2	3	4	5	6	7	8	9	R	H	E
Kansas City	0	0	0	0	0	1	3	2	2	8	14	0
Washington-Homestead	0	0	0	0	0	0	0	0	0	0	2	6
W: Jack Matchett (1-0) L: Roy Welmaker (0-1)
HRs: none
Umpires: John Craig, -- Kemp, and Script Lee

Satchel Paige and Roy Welmaker matched zeros for five innings, before Jack Matchett relieved Paige. Paige allowed consecutive singles to Sam Bankhead and Howard Easterling in the fourth inning, but the Grays batters were hitless otherwise. The Monarchs scored in the sixth on errors by Bankhead and Josh Gibson, and then scored in each inning afterward, routing the Grays by an 8-0 score. Matchett was credited with the victory.

Script Lee, who umpired at third base this game, was the losing pitcher in the final game of the first Colored World Series in 1924.

=== Game Two ===
September 10, 1942, at Forbes Field in Pittsburgh

Team	1	2	3	4	5	6	7	8	9	R	H	E
Kansas City	1	0	0	1	0	0	0	3	3	8	13	1
Washington-Homestead	0	0	0	0	0	0	0	4	0	4	12	2
W: Hilton Smith (1-0) L: Roy Partlow (0-1) SV: Satchel Paige (1)
HRs: none
Umpires: John Craig, Raymond "Mo" Harris, and Win Harris

Before the game, Paige was announced as the starter, but Hilton Smith started instead and pitched five hitless innings before turning pitching chores over to Paige with a 2-0 lead. Paige preserved the lead by pitching out of a two-out bases-loaded jam in the seventh inning when he struck out Josh Gibson on three pitches.

The Monarchs scored three runs in the top of the eighth on William "Bonnie" Serrell's bases-loaded triple (Serrell was thrown out at the plate attempting to make it an inside-the-park grand slam), but the Grays finally broke into the scoring column with four runs in their half of the inning. Paige again pitched out of a jam and ended the inning with a 5-4 lead. Three runs in the ninth gave the Monarchs a final 8-4 cushion, and Paige earned a save for his relief work.

Rain had fallen in Pittsburgh most of the day, and bad weather threatened throughout the game, and attendance was held down as a result.

One of the great legends of Negro league play is the story that Satchel Paige deliberately walked the bases loaded in the late innings in order to face and strike out Josh Gibson, taunting him as he did.

As frequently told in one form, Paige came into the game in the seventh inning with a 2-0 lead. With two out in the inning, the Grays’ leadoff man Jerry Benjamin tripled. With two out and a man on third, Paige, after some discussion with his manager, intentionally walked the next two batters, Vic Harris and Howard Easterling, so he could face Gibson, the most feared hitter in all of black baseball, with the bases loaded. Paige then taunted Gibson while throwing fastballs ("this one's gonna be a pea at your knee"), getting two called strikes on Gibson and then striking him out swinging. The story has also occasionally been told as having happened in the ninth inning with the winning runs on base, and sometimes Gibson was said to have watched all three strikes sail by without ever taking his bat off his shoulder.

According to local and contemporary newspaper reports of the game, Paige retired Chester Williams, the inning’s first batter, gave up a single to pitcher Roy Partlow, retired Benjamin on a force play, then surrendered two-out singles to Harris and Eastering, loading the bases. Paige did strike out Gibson on three pitches to end the inning and preserve the lead, but there is no record of him taunting Gibson. News accounts also report that Gibson fouled off the first two pitches before missing the third strike. The box score of the game shows that Paige did not walk a man.

The first account of this mythical version first appeared in the 1948 book, Pitchin' Man, nearly two years after Gibson's death, and was told in its more familiar form in his 1962 autobiography, Maybe I'll Pitch Forever, 20 years after the fact, and would be repeated and embellished by many others (most notably Buck O'Neil) in the years since. The final score was 8-4 Monarchs, Paige earning a save.

=== Game Three ===
September 13, 1942, at Yankee Stadium in New York

Team	1	2	3	4	5	6	7	8	9	R	H	E
Kansas City	0	0	4	2	3	0	0	0	0	9	16	3
Washington-Homestead	2	0	0	0	0	1	0	0	0	3	7	4
W: Joe Matchett (2-0) L: Ray Brown (0-1)
HRs: KC – Ted Strong (1), Willard Brown (1); WAS-HOM – Howard Easterling (1)
Umpires: Fred McCreary, Bert Gholston, and John Craig

A two-out home run by Howard Easterling put the Grays up with a 2-0 lead over Paige after one inning, and Paige then uncharacteristically retired from the game after only two innings and nine batters. Jack Matchett, who had relieved Paige in Game One, came in and allowed the Grays a single unearned run for the remainder of the game. Home runs by Ted Strong and Willard Brown helped the Monarchs to score nine runs in the next three innings, and Matchett cruised to his second victory of the Series.

=== Games not counted in Series ===
September 13, 1942 (game 2) at Yankee Stadium in New York

Team	1	2	3	4	5	6	7	R	H	E
Kansas City	2	1	1	0	0	1	0	5	6	2
Washington-Homestead	0	0	0	0	0	0	0	0	3	1
W: Gready McKinnis L: Roy Partlow
HRs: KC – Joe Greene
Umpires: Fred McCreary, Bert Gholston, and John Craig

The teams scheduled a second game immediately following Game Three. It was standard practice of the Negro leagues to make the second game of any double-header a seven-inning game, and both teams agreed that it would be treated as an exhibition game and not counted in the statistics or standings of the World Series. The Monarchs won the game easily. Gread McKinnis, who had pitched all season for the Birmingham Black Barons, was signed by the Monarchs to pitch this game, and threw a three-hit shutout, winning 5-0.

After augmenting their lineup and rotation with some players signed from the Newark Eagles and Philadelphia Stars, the Grays played an exhibition game on September 16 against the Baltimore Elite Giants, whom they had edged out for the NNL title, and lost 2-1. The Monarchs beat the Cincinnati Clowns 2-1 on September 17 in a neutral-site exhibition. The game received only a brief mention in newspapers with a line score.

There was a one-week gap between this and the next game, reflecting (1) the exhibition game the Grays scheduled, (2) the Monarchs' problems being a tenant in a minor league ballpark and having to find an open date, and (3) the new wartime travel restrictions, which kept teams from chartering their own transportation between New York and Kansas City, and forcing them to rely upon public transportation. The teams would also travel to Chicago and back east again using public transportation.

September 20, 1942, at Ruppert Stadium in Kansas City

Team	1	2	3	4	5	6	7	8	9	R	H	E
Washington-Homestead	0	0	0	0	2	0	1	0	1	4	9	0
Kansas City	0	0	0	0	0	0	0	1	0	1	5	1
W: Leon Day L: Satchel Paige
HRs: none
Umpires: Billy Donaldson and Wilber "Bullet" Rogan; Hurley McNair

This game was the most widely reported of all of the Series, receiving coverage from The Sporting News, which rarely covered Negro league baseball, and Christian Science Monitor, which rarely covered baseball in any form, as well as more mainstream white dailies and several Negro press weeklies.

In the only game in their home park, Kansas City took their lone loss to the Grays, 4-1. Leon Day struck out 12 in shutting down Kansas City while Paige was roughed up by the Grays' augmented lineup; this time he got neither offensive support nor defensive relief in the defeat.

Homestead was riddled by injuries, having lost Sam Bankhead, Roy Partlow, David Whatley, and Matt Carlisle. They signed pitcher Leon Day, second baseman Lenny Pearson, and outfielder Ed Stone from the Newark Eagles, and shortstop Bus Clarkson from the Philadelphia Stars. Day held the Monarchs to one run, while Pearson shored up the Grays' defense and Pearson and Stone provided most of the team's offense for the game.

The Grays scored first. Harris walked with one out in the fifth. After Day had struck out, Benjamin tripled off the right field wall, scoring Harris, and scored a moment later on Stone's two-base hit. Homestead scored once in the seventh with two out when Pearson doubled and scored when Harris reached on O'Neil's error.

The Monarchs wasted a number of chances, but finally got on the board in the eighth. O'Neil singled leading off, went to third on Serrell's single and scored on Williams force out, making the score 3-1. The Grays added their final tally in the ninth when Pearson doubled, went to third on Harris' infield out, and scored on Day's fly ball out (sac flies were not credited at this time).

According to the Kansas City Call, "the game was interrupted several times and no less than a dozen baseballs thrown out because someone was using emery on the ball." Most of the protests were coming from Monarch batters accusing the Grays of scuffing the ball.

The Monarchs protested the use of "ringers" before the start of the game, but played the game under protest for the fans who showed up. After the game, Grays owner Cum Posey, faced with several injuries (including Sam Bankhead's broken arm and Roy Partlow developing a painful boil under his pitching arm), signed shortstop Bus Clarkson from the Philadelphia Stars and pitcher Leon Day, outfielder Ed Stone and second baseman Lenny Pearson from the Newark Eagles for the remainder of the series. Posey claimed that he had lost two other players, Carlisle and Whatley, to the military draft. The Monarchs vocally objected to the use of "ringers" before the start of the game, but played the game under official protest for the fans who showed up.

After the game, Posey claimed that he had received verbal permission to sign the players from Monarchs co-owner Tom Baird in a meeting in New York, but the details of that meeting were never publicized and the Monarchs other owner, J.L. Wilkinson, denied knowledge of any such agreement. Monarchs secretary and business manager William "Dizzy" Dismukes stated "We didn't play the Homestead Grays. We lost to the National League All-Stars."

The Kansas City Kansan reported the next day that the Monarchs were threatening to cancel the remainder of the series. However, a committee composed of officers from both leagues and both teams met that afternoon and upheld the Monarchs' protest, and the game was disallowed, leaving the Monarchs still ahead in the series, 3-0. The Grays also agreed to not use the extra players for the remainder of the series as well.

The umpiring crew for this game stood as reminders of the early days of the organized Negro leagues. Home plate umpire Billy Donaldson was one of the longest-tenured Negro league umpires, having begun his career in 1923 with the first Negro National League. First base ump Bullet Rogan spent his playing and managing careers with the Monarchs, and was now a regular NAL ump. Rogan won two games in the first Colored World Series. Third base ump Hurley McNair had also played for the Monarchs in that first Colored World Series.

No makeup game was scheduled in Kansas City, and the series moved on to Chicago.

September 27, 1942, at Wrigley Field in Chicago

The game was canceled on account of rain and was not rescheduled. It was announced in the newspapers that all remaining games would be played in Philadelphia.

=== Game Four ===
September 29, 1942, at Shibe Park in Philadelphia

Team	1	2	3	4	5	6	7	8	9	R	H	E
Kansas City	1	0	1	2	0	0	2	3	0	9	13	2
Washington-Homestead	3	0	2	0	0	0	0	0	0	5	7	1
W: Satchel Paige (1-0) L: Johnny Wright (0-1)
HRs: KC – Joe Greene (1)
Umpires: Fred McCreary, Frank Forbes, and Phil Cockrell

Paige again was scheduled to start, but was not to be found when the game began. Joe Matchett was called upon to start in his place, and struggled, giving up five unearned runs in 3 2/3 innings. Paige showed up at the ballpark, claiming he had been detained because of a speeding ticket in Lancaster, PA, and immediately relieved Matchett, not allowing a hit or run in the 5 1/3 innings he pitched. The Monarchs took the lead in the seventh inning, and padded the lead in the eighth. Roy Partlow, who was listed as injured during the "ringer" controversy, started for the Grays, but left in the second inning. Josh Gibson also made an early exit from the game, leaving after only two innings.

Phil Cockrell, umpiring at third base in this final game, was the losing pitcher in the first Colored World Series in 1924. The white World Series began the day after this series ended.

With the Kansas City game thrown out, the Grays were the home team in each of the four official games. Even counting the two non-official games, the visiting team was the winner in all six games.

In the four games that counted, Monarch second baseman Bonnie Serrell made ten hits and shortstop Jesse Williams stole five bases. If records of the Negro World Series were considered part of Major League canon, the former mark would have tied the record for a four-game World Series, set by Babe Ruth in 1928, while the latter would have established a new and as yet unbroken four-game World Series mark.

== See also ==
- 1942 World Series

== Sources ==
- Books
  - Paige, LeRoy; Lebowitz, Hal (1948). Pitchin' Man.
  - Paige, LeRoy; Lipman, David (1962). Maybe I'll Pitch Forever: A Great Baseball Player Tells the Hilarious Story Behind the Legend.
  - Holway, John (2001). The Complete Book of Baseball's Negro Leagues. Fern Park: Hastings House. ISBN 0-8038-2007-0.
  - Clark, Dick; Lester, Larry, eds. (1994). The Negro Leagues Book. Cleveland: SABR. ISBN 0-910137-55-2.
  - Heaphy, Leslie A., ed. (2007). Satchel Paige and Company: Essays on the Kansas City Monarchs, Their Greatest Star and the Negro Leagues. McFarland. ISBN 978-0-7864-3075-8.
- Newspapers
  - Baltimore Afro-American, September/October 1942
  - Chicago Defender, September/October 1942
  - Kansas City Call, September/October 1942
  - Kansas City Times, September 21, 1942
  - Philadelphia Inquirer, September 30, 1942
  - Pittsburgh Courier, September/October 1942
  - Pittsburgh Press-Gazette, September 11, 1942
  - Pittsburgh Post, September 11, 1942
  - Pittsburgh Sun-Telegraph, September 11, 1942
  - The Sporting News, September/October 1942
  - Washington Post, September 9, 1942
