= Andy Cooper =

American baseball player and manager (1898–1941)

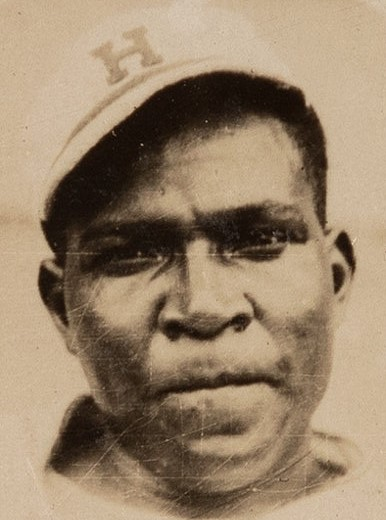
- Pitcher / Player-manager
- Born: April 24, 1898; Waco, Texas, U.S.
- Died: June 3, 1941 (aged 43); Waco, Texas, U.S.
- Batted: Right Threw: Left

Negro leagues debut
- 1920, for the Detroit Stars

Last Negro leagues appearance
- 1939, for the Kansas City Monarchs

Negro leagues (Note: On December 16, 2020, Major League Baseball declared the Negro leagues, from the span of 1920–1948, to be a "Major League". Cooper's statistics reflect his time in the Negro leagues from 1920 to 1930 and 1937 until the end of his career.) statistics
- Win–loss record: 118–64
- Earned run average: 3.58
- Strikeouts: 719
- Managerial record: 173–89–4
- Winning %: .660
- Stats at Baseball Reference
- Managerial record at Baseball Reference

Teams
- As player: Detroit Stars (1920–1927); Habana (1923); Kansas City Monarchs (1928–1929); Detroit Stars (1930); Kansas City Monarchs (1933–1936); Chicago American Giants (1937); Kansas City Monarchs (1937–1939); As manager: Kansas City Monarchs (1937–1940)

Career highlights and awards
- East–West All-Star Game (1933, 1936); Negro National League pennant (1929); 3× Negro American League pennant (1937, 1939, 1940)

Member of the National

Baseball Hall of Fame
- Induction: 2006
- Election method: Committee on African-American Baseball

Andrew Lewis Cooper (April 24, 1898 – June 3, 1941), nicknamed "Lefty", was an American professional baseball pitcher and player-manager in the Negro leagues. He was elected to the Baseball Hall of Fame in 2006. An alumnus of Paul Quinn College, Cooper played nine seasons for the Detroit Stars and ten seasons for the Kansas City Monarchs, and briefly played for the Chicago American Giants. The Texan was 6 feet 2 inches (188 cm) tall and weighed 220 pounds (100 kg; 16 st).

In defiance of a threatened five-year Negro league ban for contract jumping, Cooper joined a 1927 barnstorming team that toured Hawaii and Japan. He spent most of his later career with the Monarchs. Cooper is the Negro league record holder for career saves. In a 1937 playoff game, he pitched 17 innings. Cooper served as manager or player-manager for the Monarchs from 1937 to 1940, leading the team to the pennant three times during those four seasons.

== Early life ==
Cooper was born in Waco, Texas, where he attended A. J. Moore High School. He continued his education in Waco at Paul Quinn College (the school moved to Dallas in 1990).

== Career ==
=== Early career ===
Cooper pitched for the Detroit Stars from 1920 to 1927. The Stars played in Mack Park, which was noted for its short fences. Despite the hitter-friendly dimensions of the park, Cooper excelled as a pitcher in Detroit. The short fences often allowed Detroit's powerful hitters to provide good run support for Cooper. In The New Bill James Historical Baseball Abstract, James characterized Cooper as the best Negro league pitcher of 1923.

Cooper was traded to the Kansas City Monarchs for five players in 1928. He became known for his durability as a pitcher. To open the 1928 season, the left-hander pitched a two-hit shutout against the Cleveland Tigers, which he followed with a 4-3 win over the Tigers the next day.

=== Later career ===
Cooper returned to the Stars for another season in 1930. In nine years with the Stars, he earned a 92-47 record. He rejoined the Monarchs in 1931. One of his best years was 1936, when he went 27–8 against all levels of competition. He made his only All-Star appearance that season, as Negro league All-Star games had not been played until three years earlier.

Cooper became player-manager of the Monarchs in 1937. The Monarchs joined the newly formed Negro American League (NAL) that year. As manager for the Monarchs, he won three pennants, the most for any manager in the era of the league. Nearing the end of his career, Cooper pitched 17 innings in a playoff game that year versus the Chicago American Giants. Cooper gave up two runs in the first inning of the game, but he pitched 16 subsequent scoreless innings. In Black Baseball in Kansas City, Cooper was described as having "more junk than Fred Sanford", but he walked only one batter. The game was declared a tie after the 17th inning, but the Monarchs won the playoff series four games to one with the one tie.

Cooper became known for his ability to alter the speed of his pitches. He threw a fastball, a curveball and a screwball. He also had a well-known pickoff move. He posted a 116–57 career record and went 72–30 over a six-year span. He often pitched three games in a five-game series, starting two and relieving another. He holds the Negro league career record for saves (29). Negro league historian Dick Clark called Cooper the greatest pitcher to play for Detroit, either for the Stars or the Tigers. By 1940, Cooper had managed the team to three pennants.

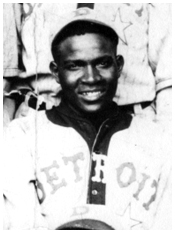
Cooper with the Detroit Stars in 1920

Negro league star Buck O'Neil said that Cooper and Kansas City owner J. L. Wilkinson were responsible for O'Neil joining the NAL and ultimately becoming a member of the Monarchs. In 1937, Cooper and Wilkinson were impressed by O'Neil but the team had a first baseman who was returning from an injury. They encouraged O'Neil to sign with the Memphis Red Sox. The Monarchs traded their first baseman the next year and purchased O'Neil's contract from Memphis.

=== Winter leagues and barnstorming teams ===
Cooper also played several seasons of winter baseball. He played in Cuba during the winters of 1923-24, 1924–25 and 1928–29; he compiled a 15-17 record there.

By 1927, player pay had been cut and morale was low in the NNL and the Eastern Colored League (ECL). To limit the options of the players, the leagues announced a five-year ban on any contract-jumping players. Cooper and three other Negro league players - Biz Mackey, Rap Dixon and Frank Duncan - decided to test the ban. They joined a traveling all-star team, the Philadelphia Royal Giants, in a four-month barnstorming tour of Japan. The team traveled by ocean liner and it took 20 days to arrive in Japan. On their return, they played some games in Honolulu. The team won all 23 games they played on the tour. Upon his return, Cooper received a 30-day suspension and a $200 fine.

Cooper went barnstorming in the Pacific with the Royal Giants in 1932-33. The team earned a 47-2-1 record as they visited the Philippines, China, Korea and Japan. Cooper recorded a .342 batting average on the trip. The next year, he accompanied the Royal Giants to Japan, China, the Philippines and Hawaii for a four-month, 35-game trip.

== Personal ==
Cooper had one son, Andy Cooper Jr.

== Illness and death ==
According to reports in the Chicago Defender, Cooper reportedly suffered a stroke early in the 1941 pre-season. He left for his home in Waco to rest and recover, leaving Newt Allen as interim manager, but suffered a fatal heart attack on June 3, having never returned to the Monarchs. He was buried in Greenwood Cemetery in Waco.

== Legacy ==
Cooper was inducted into the Baseball Hall of Fame in 2006. His Hall of Fame class included 17 black players and executives from the Negro league or pre-Negro league eras. A special committee had been formed that year to select the group, and it narrowed down a pool of 39 candidates to arrive at the final selections.

The 109th United States Congress issued a resolution that year honoring the 2006 Negro league and pre-Negro league inductees.

In 2014, Cooper made the final ballot for election to the Texas Sports Hall of Fame.

Due to the incomplete nature of Negro league baseball statistics, and the fact that Major League Baseball did not officially recognize the save statistic until the 1969 season, many Negro league pitchers are likely undercredited for the number of saves they would have actually recorded. That being said, Cooper is recognized by Baseball Reference as the Negro league all-time leader in saves with 24. He also is tied for the most saves in a season by a Negro league player, with six in 1923; the other Negro league players to record six saves in a season were Tom Williams (1924), Army Cooper (1929), and Booker McDaniel (1945).
