= Bullet Rogan =

American baseball player (1893–1967)

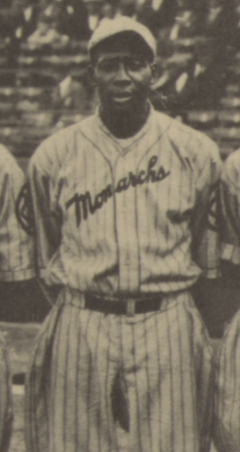
- Rogan in 1924
- Pitcher / Outfielder / Manager
- Born: July 28, 1893; Oklahoma City, Indian Territory
- Died: March 4, 1967 (aged 73); Kansas City, Missouri, U.S.
- Batted: Right Threw: Right

Negro leagues debut
- 1920, Kansas City Monarchs

Last Negro leagues appearance
- 1938, Kansas City Monarchs

Negro leagues (Note: On December 16, 2020, Major League Baseball declared certain Negro leagues, from the span of 1920–1948, to be "Major League". Rogan's statistics reflect his time in the Negro leagues from 1920 to 1930, and 1937–1938.) statistics
- Win–loss record: 120–52
- Earned run average: 2.65
- Strikeouts: 918
- Batting average: .338
- Home runs: 50
- Runs batted in: 419
- Managerial record: 257–111–1
- Winning %: .698
- Stats at Baseball Reference

Teams
- As player: Kansas City Monarchs (1920–1930, 1933–1938); As manager: Kansas City Monarchs (1926–1931, 1933–1934)

Career highlights and awards
- All-Star (1936); Negro World Series champion (1924); 4× Negro National League pennant (1923, 1924, 1925, 1929); Negro American League pennant (1937); 2× Negro National League wins leader (1923, 1924); Negro National League ERA leader (1921); 2× Negro National League strikeout leader (1923, 1925); Pitched a combined no-hitter with José Méndez against the Milwaukee Bears on August 6, 1923; Played in first night game in baseball history, April 29, 1930; Toured the Philippines, Japan, and China in 1933–34 with the Philadelphia Royal Giants

Member of the National

Baseball Hall of Fame
- Induction: 1998
- Election method: Veterans Committee

Charles Wilber Rogan (July 28, 1893 – March 4, 1967), nicknamed "Bullet Joe", was an American pitcher, outfielder, second baseman and player-manager for the Kansas City Monarchs in the Negro baseball leagues from 1920 to 1938. Renowned as a two-way player who could both hit and pitch successfully, one statistical compilation shows Rogan winning more games than any other pitcher in Negro leagues history and ranking fourth highest in career batting average. He was elected to the Baseball Hall of Fame in 1998.

Rogan's early baseball career took place in the U.S. Army, where he played for a famous team in the all-black 25th Infantry. After joining the Kansas City Monarchs, he was the top pitcher and one of the best hitters on a team that won three pennants from 1923 to 1925 and the 1924 Colored World Series. In addition to pitching and hitting, Rogan started managing in 1926 and led his team to another league title in 1929.

"Charleston was everything—but Rogan was more", said William "Big C" Johnson, one of Rogan's Army teammates. "Rogan could do everything, everywhere." "He was the onliest pitcher I ever saw, I ever heard of in my life, was pitching and hitting in the cleanup place", said Satchel Paige. According to Rogan's longtime catcher Frank Duncan, "If you had to choose between Rogan and Paige, you'd pick Rogan, because he could hit. The pitching, you'd as soon have Satchel as Rogan, understand? But Rogan's hitting was so terrific. Get my point?" Casey Stengel called Rogan "one of the best—if not the best—pitcher that ever lived."

== Early life ==
Charles Wilber Rogan was born in Oklahoma City, Oklahoma.

After the death of his mother and his father's remarriage in 1908, he moved with his family to Kansas City, Kansas, where he attended Sumner High School. He began his baseball career there in 1911 as a catcher with Fred Palace's Colts, a semipro team composed mostly of teenagers. Also joining the Colts that season was Dick Whitworth, who would, like Rogan, go on to pitch for many years in the Negro leagues.

Friction with his stepmother and unhappiness with the segregated high school he attended led Rogan to drop out of school before graduation and enlist in the Army on October 19, 1911. He lied about his age to do so. This would cause later confusion about Rogan's age, as some records (along with his Hall of Fame plaque) give his birth year as 1889, others as 1893; recent histories, such as Phil Dixon's, conclude that the latter date is correct.

== U.S. Army and the 25th Infantry Wreckers ==
Rogan served in the Philippines during American colonization with the 24th Infantry Regiment, an all-black regiment, for three years. He was honorably discharged in 1914.

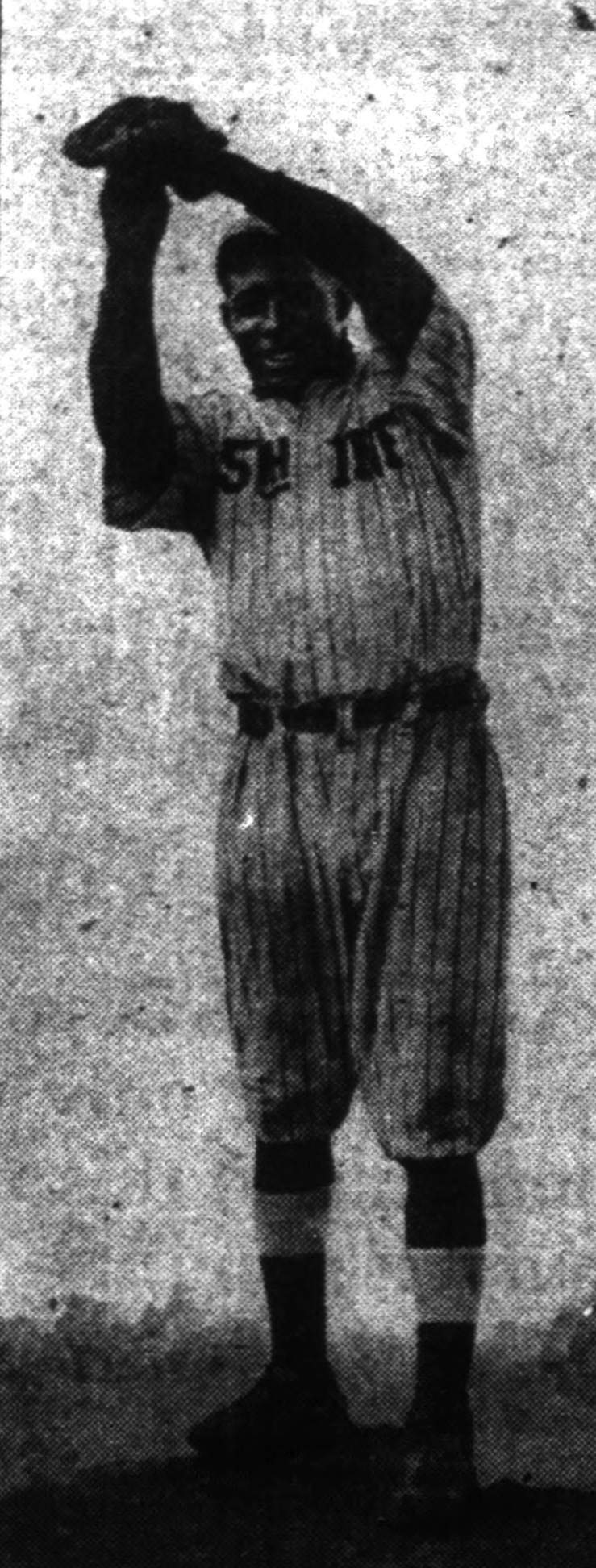
Rogan in 25th Wreckers Uniform in 1917

Before returning to the United States, Rogan reenlisted, this time with the 25th Infantry, another African American unit, at that time stationed at Schofield Barracks in Hawaii. He was specifically recruited to play for the regiment's famous baseball team, known as the "Wreckers." He made his debut with the Wreckers on July 4, 1915.

His Army teammates included a number of later Negro league stars, such as Dobie Moore, Heavy Johnson, Bob Fagan, Lemuel Hawkins, and William "Big C" Johnson. Over the next three seasons, the Wreckers won the Post League championship, the United States Army Series, and the Oahu League. In February 1917 Rogan twice defeated the Portland Beavers of the Pacific Coast League, who were visiting the islands for spring training. On furlough for several months in 1917, Rogan played professionally for the Los Angeles White Sox, the Kansas City, Kansas, Giants, and J. L. Wilkinson's All Nations Club, but returned to the army for three more years.

In August 1918 Rogan and the rest of the 25th Infantry were moved to Camp Stephen D. Little in Nogales, Arizona. Researchers John Holway and James Riley report that in 1919, Casey Stengel played against Rogan in Arizona, and subsequently recommended him to Wilkinson for his new Negro National League team, the Kansas City Monarchs. However, Rogan had already played in the California Winter League and for Wilkinson's All-Nations team in 1917, and had already been noted by African American newspapers as early as 1916.

== Professional career ==
Rogan with the Kansas City Monarchs, c. 1924

In July 1920, Rogan and Dobie Moore joined the Monarchs. Rogan quickly became the premier pitcher and biggest box-office draw in the young league. By his third season with the Monarchs, 1922, he hit .390, and his 13 home runs were good for second in the league. On August 6, 1923, Rogan combined with teammate and manager José Méndez to pitch a no-hitter against the Milwaukee Bears, Méndez pitching the first five innings and Rogan the last four. That season he hit .364 with a league-leading 16 wins and 151 strikeouts to lead the Monarchs to their first pennant.

In 1924 Rogan hit .395 while compiling an 18–6 record and leading the Monarchs to their second league title. He starred in the first Black World Series, leading the Monarchs with 13 hits and winning two games as Kansas City defeated the Eastern Colored League champion Hilldales. That winter he led the 1924/25 Cuban League with nine victories for the champion Almendares club.

Rogan may have reached his peak in 1925, leading Kansas City to its third straight league championship with a 17–2 record and a .381 batting average. In the playoffs against the St. Louis Stars he hit .450 and won three more games, including one shutout. However, before the World Series rematch with Hilldale, Rogan suffered a knee injury while playing with his young son. Forced to undergo surgery, he missed the series. Without their star, the Monarchs were defeated in six games.

The following season, Rogan took over from José Méndez as manager of the Kansas City Monarchs. In that season's NNL playoffs against the Chicago American Giants, he pitched and lost both games of a series-deciding doubleheader to the younger Bill Foster. As late as 1928 at the age of 34, Bullet Rogan was the best hitter (.358) and arguably the best pitcher (10–2) on the Monarchs. That year he slammed three home runs in a game against the Detroit Stars.

Rogan continued at the Monarchs' helm in 1929 when they won their fourth NNL championship and recorded the best record (62–17) in the history of the league. On April 29, 1930, in Enid, Oklahoma, Rogan played for the Monarchs in baseball's first night game. In August he was hospitalized with an undisclosed illness. He remained out of the lineup for more than a year, finally returning on September 28, 1931.

When Wilkinson did not organize a Kansas City Monarchs team for 1932, Rogan joined a white independent team in Jamestown, North Dakota, where he played until August. He batted .315 and went 20–3 as a pitcher before returning to the reorganized Monarchs in September. In the winter of 1933 and 1934, Rogan returned to Hawaii and the Philippines as a member of the Philadelphia Royal Giants, a black all-star team. The Royal Giants toured Japan and China as well. In 1936, at the age of 43, Rogan appeared in the East-West All-Star Game.

== Rogan as player and manager ==
Relatively small (5 foot 7, 160 pounds (72.6 kg)), Rogan was solidly built and strong, with thin legs and a narrow waist but broad shoulders. He threw and batted right-handed, and used an unusually heavy bat. "You saw Ernie Banks hit in his prime, then you saw Rogan", said Buck O'Neil. "He could hit that ball...He was the type of guy that stood a long way from the plate. Not too close, because they'd jam you." According to his longtime teammate Frank Duncan, "Rogan was one of the best low-ball hitters I ever saw, and one of the best curve-ball hitters. Rogan taught Bob and Irish Meusel how to hit curve balls." While not extremely fast, he ran the bases well and stole when necessary.

As a pitcher, Rogan used a no-windup delivery and both overhand and sidearm motions, and relied on an array of curveballs, a spitball, a palmball, a forkball, and the fastball that gave him his nickname. According to the sportswriter A.S. "Doc" Young, "Joe Rogan possessed as much natural ability as Smokey Joe or Satch, but his control was not up to theirs." Frank Duncan, who caught both Paige and Rogan, said,

Satchel was easier to catch. He could throw it in a quart cup. But Rogan was all over the plate—high, low, inside, outside. He'd walk five-six men, but he didn't give up many runs. Bullet had a little more steam on the ball than Paige—and he had a better-breaking curve. The batters thought it was a fastball heading for them and they would jump back from the plate and all of a sudden, it would break sharply for a strike. I would rank him with today's best. I have never seen a pitcher like him, and I have caught some of the best pitchers in the business.

Another Monarchs teammate, George Carr, said,

Rogan was the greatest pitcher that ever threw a ball. He had not only an arm to pitch with but a head to think with. Rogan was a smart pitcher with a wonderful memory. Once Rogan pitched to a batter, he never forgot that batter's weaknesses and strong points. And don't think Rogan was nicknamed "Bullet" for nothing. That guy had a ball that was almost too fast to catch. He would really burn 'em in there.

As a manager, he was a strict disciplinarian, possibly a result of his military background. Carroll "Dink" Mothell maintained that "Rogan wanted to run the ball club like they did it in the army. He liked to give orders too much, even before he was managing. He used to bawl players out for different things. I could take it, but we had ball players, when he'd get on them, they'd go into a shell, resented it, and didn't give him their best." Another Monarchs pitcher, Chet Brewer, said that "Rogan wasn't the best manager because he was such a great ball player himself. He couldn't teach pitchers much, because he'd say, 'All you have to do is go out and throw the man what I threw'." According to historian Phil Dixon, "In Rogan's first few years as manager he was reluctant to pinch-hit for many of the veterans on his roster because they were his friends." He did not trust younger players, often inserting himself to pitch or pinch-hit for them. He sometimes treated rookies harshly. Eventually Rogan "discarded his distant approach" and became increasingly known for teaching and developing less experienced players.

== Personal life ==
On October 22, 1922, Wilber Rogan married Kathrine McWilliams, a Colorado farm girl. Their son Wilber Rogan, Jr., was born right after the 1924 World Series. Between the 1923 and 1924 seasons, it was reported that Rogan spent the winter writing life insurance. After his retirement as a player, Rogan became an umpire in the Negro American League until 1946, then worked in the post office. He died in Kansas City, Missouri on March 4, 1967, at age 73. The Baseball Hall of Fame first admitted Negro league players in the 1970s, but did not honor Rogan until 1998, 31 years after his death.

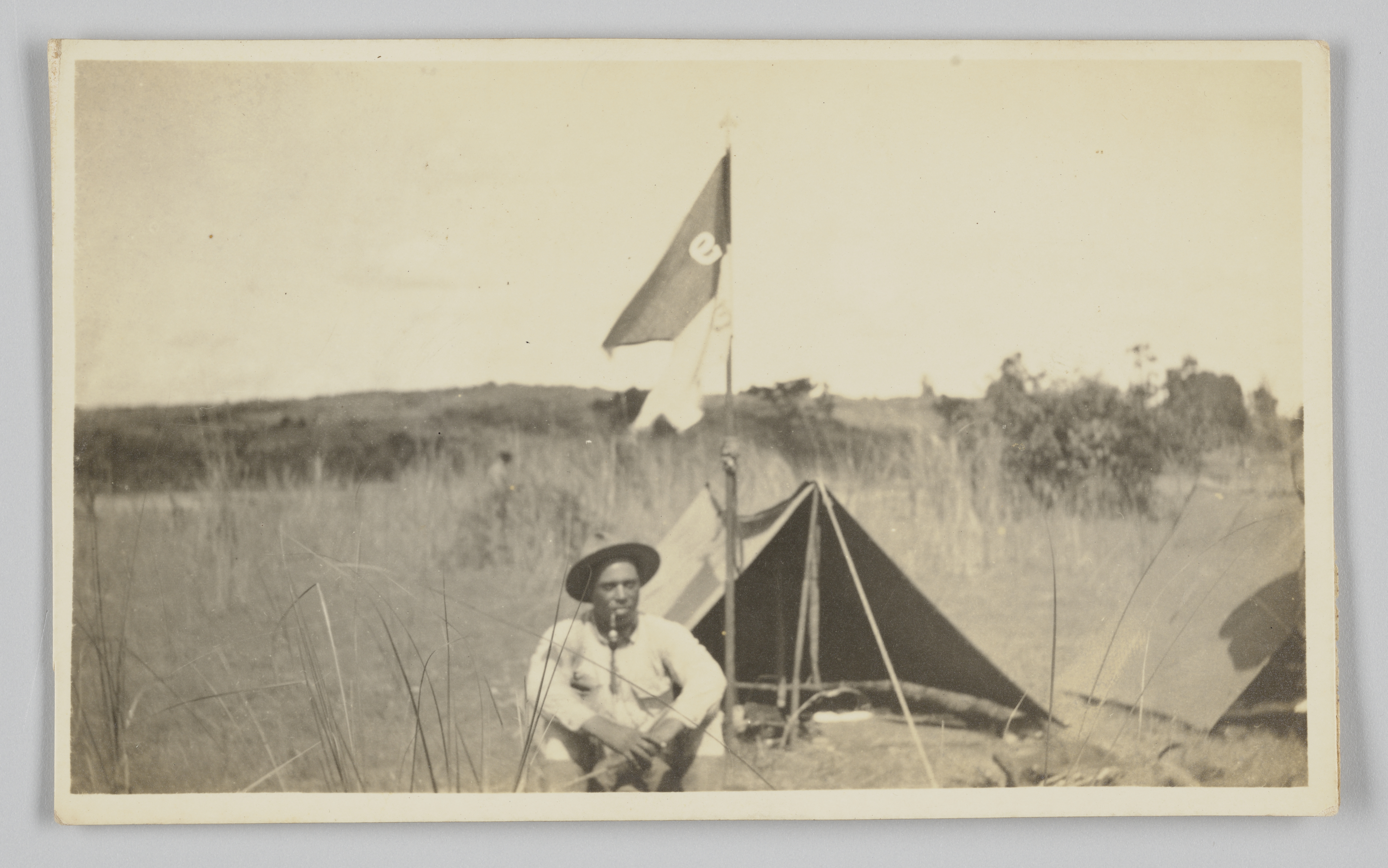
Wilber Rogan smoking a pipe at camp in the Philippines

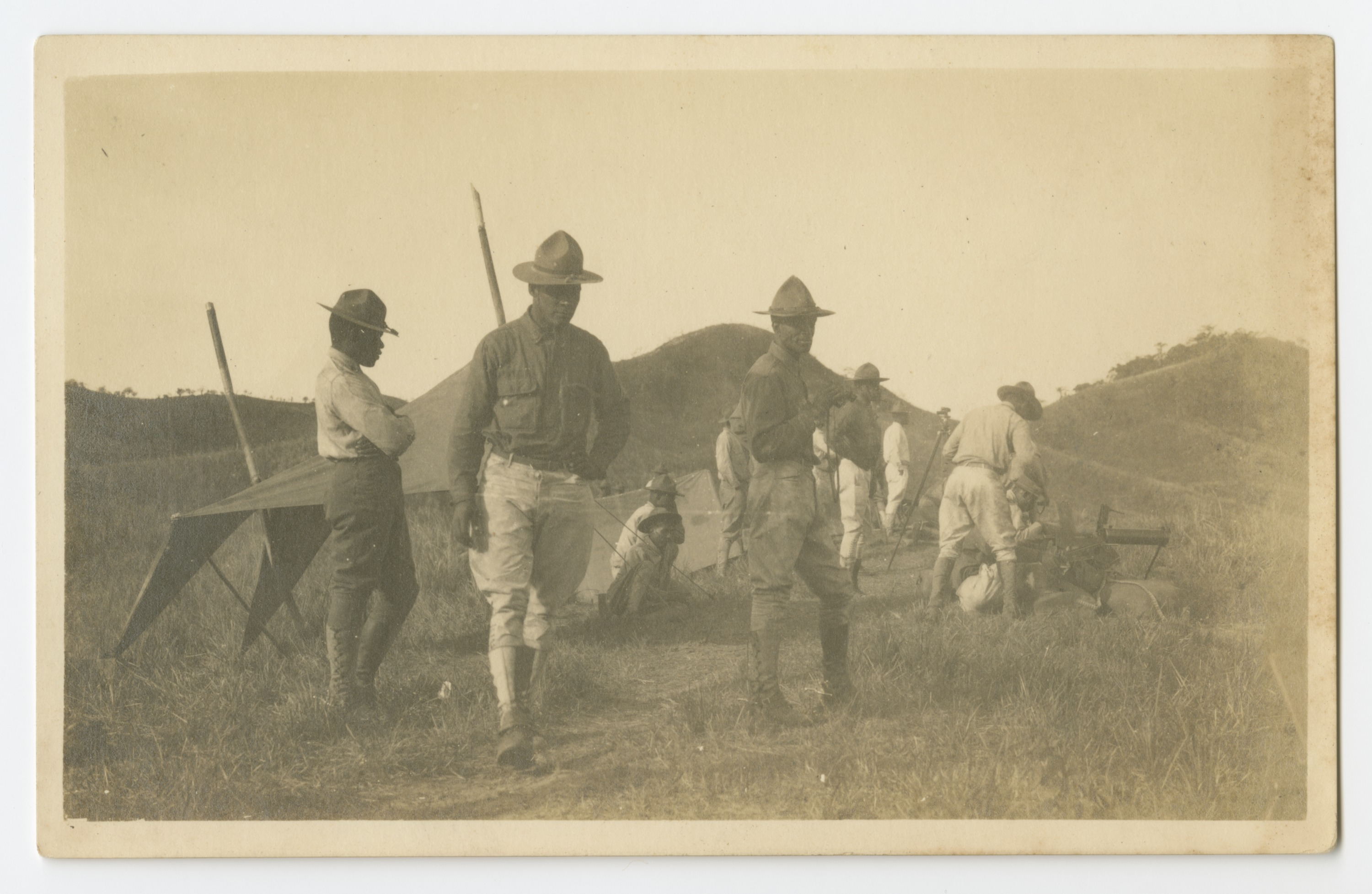
Wilbur Rogan at camp with the 24th Infantry

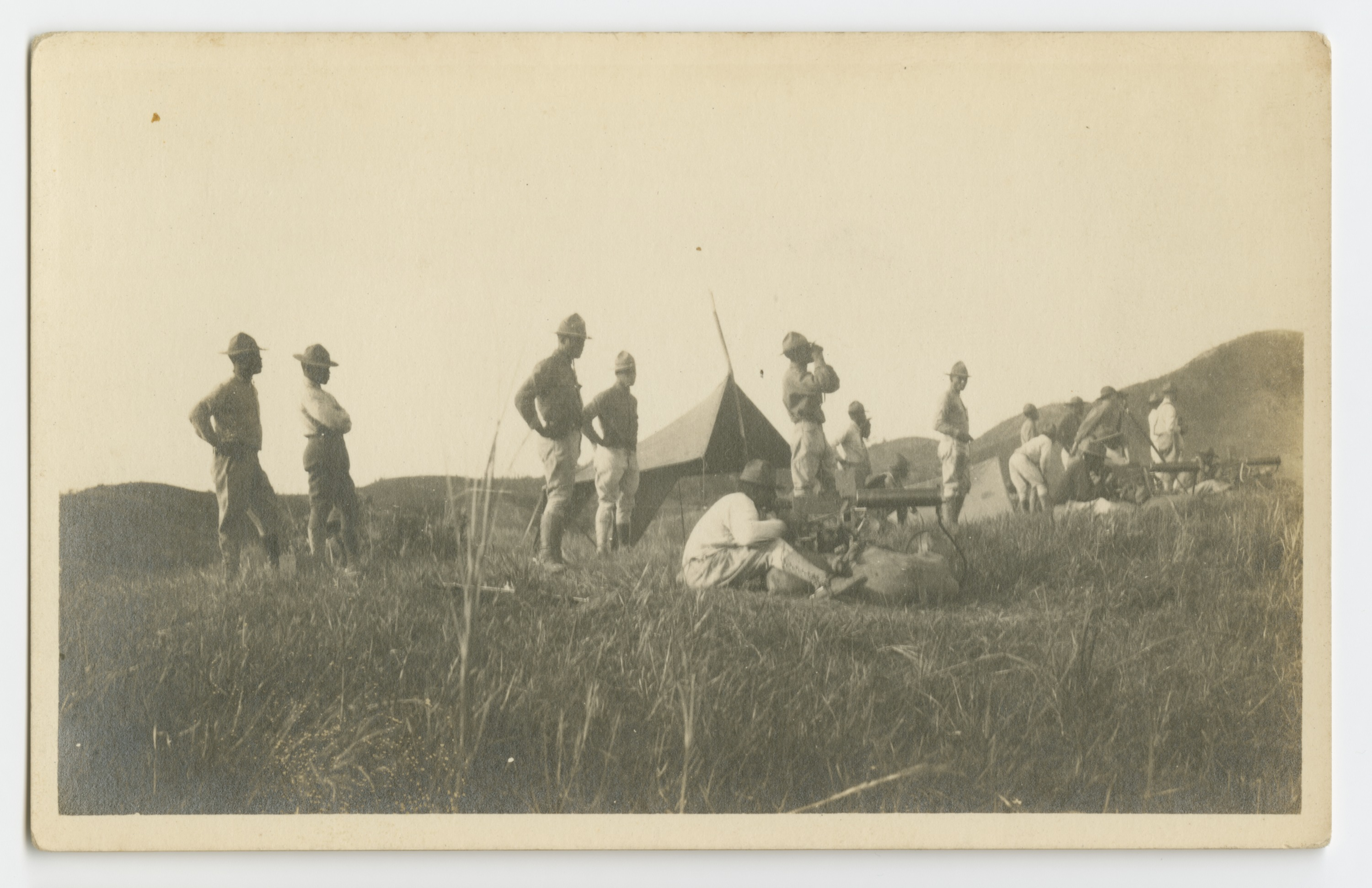
Wilbur Rogan at camp with the 24th Infantry

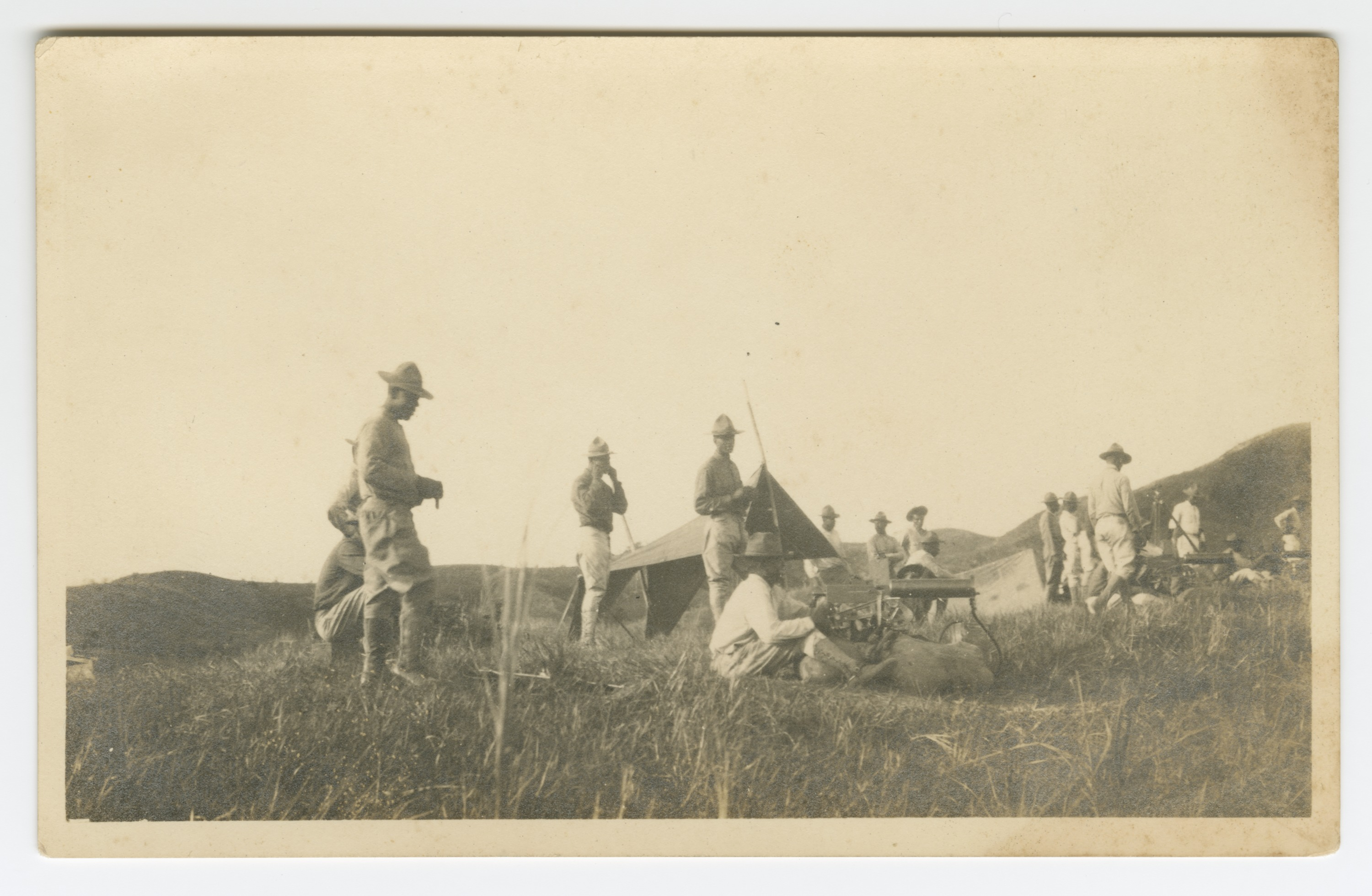
Wilbur Rogan at camp with the 24th Infantry

== Career statistics ==
=== Major leagues ===
Rogan played games in the Negro Leagues in 17 years, and against white Major League teams in three.

- Negro league baseball statistics and player information from Seamheads.com, or Baseball Reference (Negro leagues)

And Major League Baseball: https://www.mlb.com/player/bullet-rogan-492581

=== California Winter League ===
Batting

Year	Team	G	AB	H	2B	3B	HR	BA	SLG
1920/21	Los Angeles White Sox	30	106	39	3	4	5 *	.368 *	.613
1925/26	Philadelphia Royal Giants	30	89	30	8	0	2	.326	.494
1926/27	Philadelphia Royal Giants	23	57	17	2	0	0	.298	.333
1928/29	Cleveland Giants	28	106	43	5	1	4	.406	.585
1929/30	Philadelphia Royal Giants	19	76	28	8	0	4	.362	.632
Total		130	434	157	25	5	15	.362	.546
* = league leader.

Pitching

Year	Team	W	L	Pct	G	CG	IP	BB	SO	ShO
1920/21	Los Angeles White Sox	8	8	.500	16	16	144	74 *	110 *	1 *
1925/26	Philadelphia Royal Giants	14 *	2	.875	18 *	16 *	153 *	52 *	82 *	1
1926/7	Philadelphia Royal Giants	6	2	.750	11 *	6	68	21 *	38	2 *
1928/29	Cleveland Giants	9	1	.900	12	8	92	21	68	1
1929/30	Philadelphia Royal Giants	5	1	.800	7	6	59	21	53 *	0
Total		42	14	.750	64	52	516	189	351	5
* = league leader.

Rogan spent five seasons in the integrated California Winter League between 1920 and 1930 against teams of white major and minor leaguers. Rogan's team won the championship every year.

=== Cuban (Winter) League ===
Year	Team	League	W	L	Pct	G	CG
1924/25	Almendares p	Cuban	9*	4	.692	18	5
p = pennant; * – led league.

=== Against all competition ===
Historian Phil Dixon puts Rogan's lifetime totals against all competition, including semipro and Army teams, at more than 350 games won, 2000 strikeouts, 2500 hits, 350 home runs, and 500 stolen bases.
