= Booker McDaniel =

American baseball player (1913–1974)

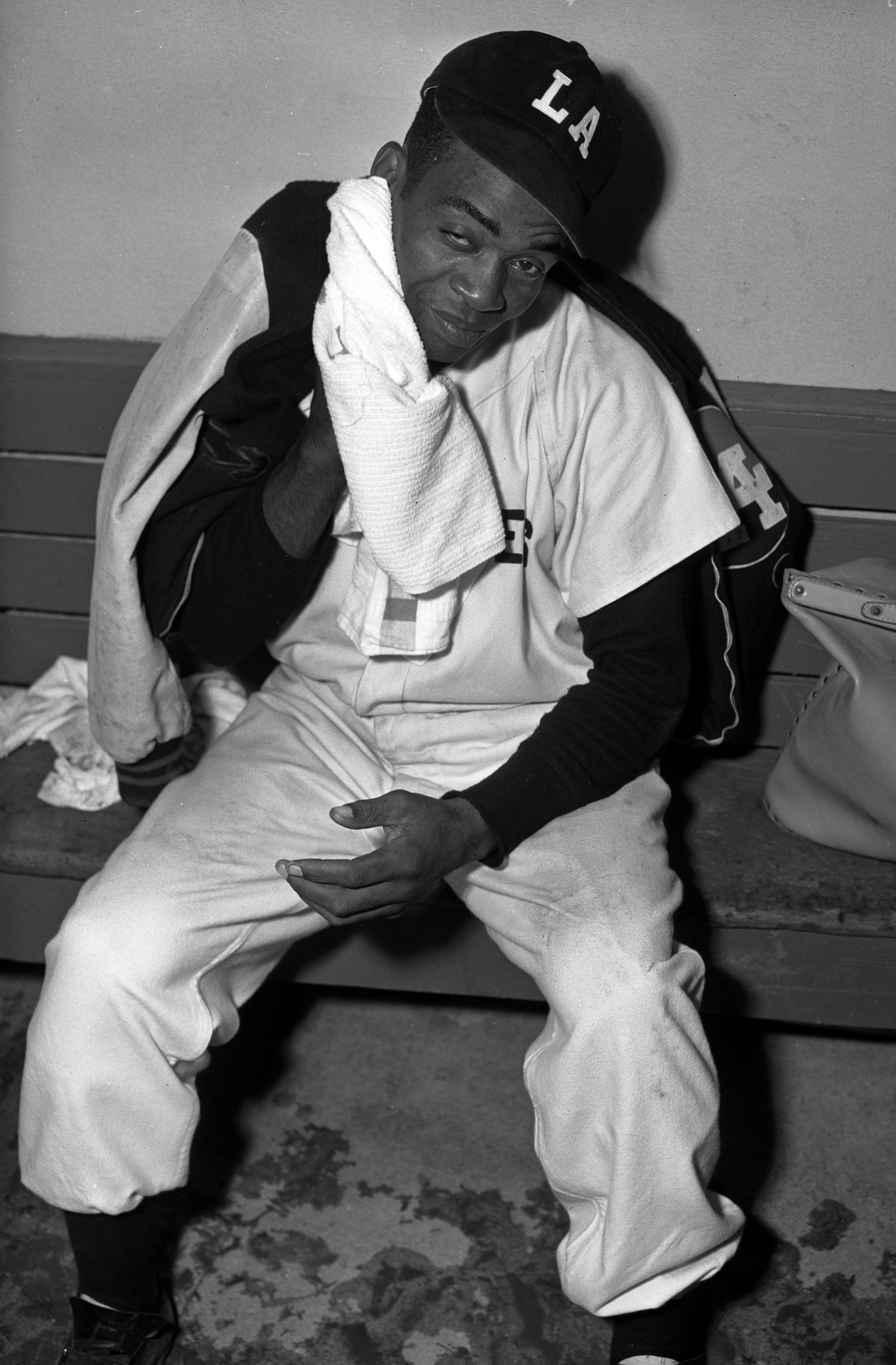
- Pitcher
- Born: September 13, 1913; Kenwood, Arkansas, U.S.
- Died: December 12, 1974 (aged 61); Kansas City, Kansas, U.S.
- Batted: Right Threw: Right

Negro league baseball debut
- 1940, for the Kansas City Monarchs

Last appearance
- 1949, for the Kansas City Monarchs
- Stats at Baseball Reference

Teams
- Kansas City Monarchs (1940–1946, 1949)

Career highlights and awards
- Negro American League wins leader (1945); Negro American League strikeout leader (1945)

Booker Taliaferro McDaniel (September 13, 1913 – December 12, 1974) was an American professional baseball pitcher in the Negro leagues. He played from 1940 to 1946, and again in 1949 with the Kansas City Monarchs. He also played for the Los Angeles Angels of the Pacific Coast League in 1949 and 1950. McDaniel died of throat cancer.
