= Jack Matchett =

American baseball player

- Pitcher
- Born: February 4, 1908; Palestine, Texas
- Died: March 19, 1979 (aged 71); Los Angeles, California
- Batted: Left Threw: Right

debut
- 1940, for the Kansas City Monarchs

Last appearance
- 1945, for the Kansas City Monarchs

Negro American League statistics
- Win–loss record: 19–7
- Run average: 4.16
- Strikeouts: 94

Teams
- Kansas City Monarchs (1940, 1942–1945); Cincinnati Clowns (1942)

Career highlights and awards
- Negro World Series champion (1942)

Clarence "Jack" Matchett (February 4, 1908 – March 19, 1979) was a pitcher in Negro league baseball. He played for the Kansas City Monarchs and Cincinnati Clowns between 1940 and 1945.
