= Jim LaMarque =

American baseball player (1921–2000)

- Pitcher
- Born: July 29, 1921; Potosi, Missouri, U.S.
- Died: January 15, 2000 (aged 78); North Kansas City, Missouri, U.S.
- Batted: Left Threw: Left

Negro league baseball debut
- 1942, for the Kansas City Monarchs

Last appearance
- 1951, for the Kansas City Monarchs

Teams
- Kansas City Monarchs (1942–1951)

Career highlights and awards
- Negro World Series champion (1942); 2× Negro National League wins leader (1947, 1948); 2× Negro National League strikeout leader (1947, 1948)

James Harding LaMarque (July 29, 1921 – January 15, 2000), also nicknamed "Lefty", was an American professional baseball pitcher in the Negro leagues. He played from 1942 to 1951 with the Kansas City Monarchs. He also played with the Diablos Rojos del México of the Mexican League in 1950.
