= Newt Allen =

American baseball player and manager (1901-1988)

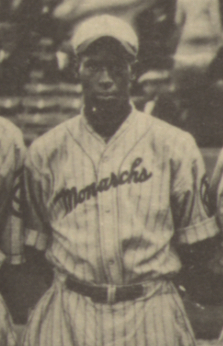
- Allen at the 1924 Colored World Series
- Second baseman / Manager
- Born: May 19, 1901; Austin, Texas, US
- Died: June 9, 1988 (aged 87); Cincinnati, Ohio, US
- Batted: Right Threw: Right

Negro leagues debut
- 1923, for the Kansas City Monarchs

Last Negro leagues appearance
- 1947, for the Indianapolis Clowns

Negro leagues (Note: On December 16, 2020, Major League Baseball declared certain Negro leagues, from the span of 1920–1948, to be "major" leagues. Allen's statistics reflect his time in the Negro leagues from 1922 to 1932, and from 1937 until the end of his career.) statistics
- Batting average: .288
- Hits: 1,053
- Home runs: 21
- Runs batted in: 476
- Stats at Baseball Reference
- Managerial record at Baseball Reference

Teams
- Kansas City Monarchs (1923–1945); St. Louis Stars (1931); Detroit Wolves (1932); Homestead Grays (1932); Chicago American Giants (1937); Indianapolis Clowns (1947)

Career highlights and awards
- 3× NgL All-Star (1937, 1938, 1941); 2× Negro World Series champion (1924, 1942)

Newton Henry Allen (May 19, 1901 – June 9, 1988) was an American second baseman and manager in baseball's Negro leagues.

Born in Austin, Texas, he began his Negro league career late in 1923 with the Kansas City Monarchs and, except for brief stints with other teams in 1931 and 1932, stayed with the Monarchs until his retirement in 1948. Long known for his leadership ability, he became the Monarchs' manager in 1941 when Andy Cooper suffered a pre-season stroke and died during the season. He won the Negro American League championship that season, but resigned as manager just before the beginning of the following season, resuming his duties as a reserve infielder.

Allen's accomplishments as a player were even more impressive. A master at scoring runs, he bunted, stole bases and almost always provided the spark his team needed to win. Among the fastest baserunners of his generation of Negro leaguers, his most remarkable season was his 1929 campaign, in which he batted .330 while hitting 24 doubles and stealing 23 bases in a typically abbreviated Negro league season.

Allen is listed on the second team of a 1952 Pittsburgh Courier poll of the greatest black baseball players of all time. Allen made the list of 39 finalists for the 2006 special Negro leagues and Pre-Negro leagues Election for the Baseball Hall of Fame, but was not one of the 17 ultimately chosen.

Allen died at age 87 in Cincinnati, Ohio.
