= Herb Souell =

American baseball player (1913–1978)

- Third baseman
- Born: February 5, 1913; West Monroe, Louisiana, U.S.
- Died: July 12, 1978 (aged 65); Los Angeles, California, U.S.
- Batted: Both Threw: Right

Negro league baseball debut
- 1940, for the Kansas City Monarchs

Last appearance
- 1950, for the Kansas City Monarchs
- Stats at Baseball Reference

Teams
- Kansas City Monarchs (1940–1950)

Herbert Souell (February 5, 1913 – July 12, 1978) was an American professional baseball third baseman in the Negro leagues. He played from 1940 to 1950 with the Kansas City Monarchs. He also played in the minor leagues in the Western International League and Arizona–Texas League in 1952. He played for the Spokane Indians, Tucson Cowboys, and the Chihuahua Dorados.
