= Hilton Smith =

American baseball player (1907–1983)

- Pitcher / Outfielder
- Born: February 27, 1907; Giddings, Texas, U.S.
- Died: November 18, 1983 (aged 76); Kansas City, Missouri, U.S.
- Batted: Right Threw: Right

Negro leagues debut
- 1932, for the Monroe Monarchs

Last Negro leagues appearance
- 1948, for the Kansas City Monarchs

Negro leagues (Note: On December 16, 2020, Major League Baseball declared the Negro leagues, from the span of 1920–1948, to be a "Major League". Smith's statistics reflect his time in the Negro leagues from 1932 and from 1937 until the end of his career.) statistics
- Win–loss record: 70–38
- Earned run average: 2.92
- Strikeouts: 594
- Stats at Baseball Reference

Teams
- Monroe Monarchs (1932–1935); Kansas City Monarchs (1936–1948)

Career highlights and awards
- 6× All-Star (1937–1942); Negro World Series champion (1942); Negro American League Triple Crown (1938); Negro American League ERA leader (1938); 3× Negro American League wins leader (1937, 1938, 1941); 4× Negro American League strikeout leader (1937–1939, 1941)

Member of the National

Baseball Hall of Fame
- Induction: 2001
- Election method: Veterans Committee

Hilton Lee Smith (February 27, 1907 (Note: During his lifetime, Smith claimed that his birthdate was 1912, which is the date shown in several references such as Riley, p. 723. Nearly 20 years after his death, however, historian Larry Lester discovered information and confirmed that his actual birthdate was February 27, 1907; see Thornley, p. 136.) – November 18, 1983) was an American professional baseball pitcher and outfielder in the Negro leagues. He pitched alongside Satchel Paige for the Kansas City Monarchs and the Bismarck Club between 1932 and 1948. He was inducted into the National Baseball Hall of Fame in 2001.

== Early life ==
Born in Giddings, Texas, Smith began his career in black baseball's equivalent of the minor leagues with the Austin Black Senators in Austin, Texas. Smith made the dean's list as a student at Prairie View A&M College in 1928 and 1929. He was an outfielder in his first college season and a pitcher in his second year.

His big-league debut was with the Monroe Monarchs of Monroe, Louisiana, in 1932. In 1934, Smith wed Louise Humphrey. They had two children.

== Semiprofessional career ==
From 1935 to 1936, Smith pitched for the Bismarck semiprofessional team organized by Neil Churchill. In 1935, his teammates included Satchel Paige, Ted "Double Duty" Radcliffe, Quincy Trouppe, Barney Morris, and Chet Brewer. In August, the team won the national semipro championship in Wichita, Kansas. In 1936, Paige, Radcliffe, and Brewer departed and Smith became the ace of the Bismarck team. They returned to the national championship, where Smith won four games, but Bismarck failed to repeat as champions.

Smith joined the semipro Fulda Giants of rural Fulda, Minnesota, in 1949 after being recruited by manager Dick Reusse following Smith's tenure with the Kansas City Monarchs. Due to having a "dead arm" following his major league career, Smith played more first base than he pitched for the Fulda Giants.

== Negro league career ==
In late 1936, Smith signed with the Kansas City Monarchs. From 1937 until his retirement in 1948, Smith was a star pitcher on the Monarchs. He possessed an outstanding curveball, but was overshadowed by his more flamboyant teammate Satchel Paige. Often, Paige would pitch the first three innings of a game, leaving Smith to pitch the remaining six. Also, unlike Paige, Smith was a very good hitter. Smith led the Negro American League in wins three times (1937–38, 1941). He also led the NAL with strikeouts four times (1937–39, 1941). He was tied with Ray Brown as the second player in Negro league history to win the pitching Triple Crown, doing so in 1938 with 9 wins, 88 strikeouts, and a 1.92 ERA.

== Post-playing career and death ==
After retiring from baseball, Smith worked as a schoolteacher and later as a steel-plant foreman. He also scouted for the Chicago Cubs. Smith had a quiet, reserved temperament, but in his later years, he stood up for Negro league players in their struggle to be inducted into the Baseball Hall of Fame. He died in 1983 in Kansas City, Missouri. In 2001, he was posthumously inducted into the Baseball Hall of Fame.

== See also ==
- List of Negro league baseball no-hitters
