= Willard Brown =

American baseball player (1915–1996)

- Outfielder
- Born: June 26, 1915; Shreveport, Louisiana, U.S.
- Died: August 4, 1996 (aged 81); Houston, Texas, U.S.
- Batted: Right Threw: Right

Professional debut
- NgL: 1936, for the Kansas City Monarchs
- MLB: July 19, 1947, for the St. Louis Browns

Last appearance
- MLB: August 17, 1947, for the St. Louis Browns
- NgL: 1951, for the Kansas City Monarchs

MLB (Note: On December 16, 2020, Major League Baseball declared the Negro leagues, from the span of 1920–1948, to be a "Major League". Brown's statistics reflect his time in the Negro leagues from 1937 to 1948.) statistics
- Batting average: .351
- Home runs: 54
- Runs batted in: 391
- Stats at Baseball Reference

Teams
- Kansas City Monarchs (1937–1944, 1946–1947); St. Louis Browns (1947); Kansas City Monarchs (1948–1951)

Career highlights and awards
- 4× Negro American League pennant (1937, 1939, 1940, 1941); Negro World Series champion (1942); 6× NgL All-Star (1936–1937, 1942–1943, 1948–1949); Negro American League batting champion (1947); First African-American to hit a home run in the American League

Member of the National

Baseball Hall of Fame
- Induction: 2006
- Election method: Committee on African-American Baseball

Willard Jessie Brown (June 26, 1915 – August 4, 1996) was an American professional baseball player who played as an outfielder in the Negro leagues for the Kansas City Monarchs and in Major League Baseball (MLB) for the St. Louis Browns, where he was one of the league's first African American players. Often called "Home Run Brown" for making history as the first Black ballplayer to hit a home run in the American League, Brown's other nicknames included "Sonny", due to his preference for crowded Sunday games, and "Ese Hombre" ("That Man"), due to his offensive dominance playing in the Puerto Rican Winter League.

For the Monarchs, Brown led the Negro American League in hits for eight seasons (1937–39, 1941–43, 1946, 1948) and runs batted in (RBI) seven times during his career. His eight times leading a league in hits is tied with Ty Cobb for most in baseball history while his seven times leading in RBI for a league is tied for second-most in baseball history with Josh Gibson; Gibson and Brown also finished in the top two in batting average in five seasons each, the most in Negro league history.

In 1947, Willard Brown and fellow Monarchs player Hank Thompson both signed with the St. Louis Browns, becoming the third and fourth Black ballplayers in the MLB and marking the first time two African Americans played as teammates on the same MLB team. Brown is a member of the National Baseball Hall of Fame and Museum.

== Early life ==
Brown was born in Shreveport, Louisiana on 26 June 1915. He grew up in Natchitoches, Louisiana and in Shreveport. Brown's father was a mill laborer who became the owner of a cabinetmaking shop. Brown was a batboy in spring training for the Kansas City Monarchs, as the Negro league team held its workouts in Shreveport.

== Baseball career ==
He began his baseball career in 1934 with the Monroe Monarchs, a minor Negro league team in the Negro Southern League. In 1937, he signed with the Kansas City Monarchs, for which he would play in six out of the next eight years. A rookie season of 56 games played with a .379 batting average, ten home runs, 81 hits, and 60 RBI (for which he led the latter three categories) proved to be the beginning of a career full of raw power.

During his pre-war baseball years, he established himself as having the most raw power in Negro league history, and possibly in the history of baseball. He hit home runs more often than the better known Josh Gibson, causing Gibson to give Brown his nickname.

He also hit for a batting average of .374 in 1948 and regularly hitting over .350. Brown was one of the fastest players in baseball in the late 1930s and 1940s, as well as a solid outfielder. From 1937 to 1946, Brown helped lead the Monarchs to six pennants in ten seasons. He finished second in batting average three times during this period (1937, 1939, 1943).

Brown left the Monarchs for the first time in 1940, swayed by the Mexican Leagues (as devised by Jorge Pasquel), who raided 63 players with the promise of more money ($1,000 per month); Brown played in Nuevo Laredo.

In the 1942 season, the Monarchs met the Negro National League champion Homestead Grays in the 1942 Negro World Series, the first Negro World Series between the Negro American League and the Negro National League since 1927. Brown stole a base in Game 2 and hit a home run in Game 3 while collecting seven hits in sixteen combined at-bats in four official games (an exhibition game and a game later not counted by the league was also played).

In the winter of 1941-42, he moved to the Puerto Rican leagues in Humacao. He also played parts of 1943-44 in the California Winter League. He served in the U.S. Army in 1944, seeing service in Europe before returning to the Monarchs in 1946 after being released from duty as a technician fifth grade. He batted .371 in 1947, leading the league for the first and only time.

Like many players of this era, in 1944 Brown left baseball to serve for two years in the U.S. Army during WWII. In 1946 he would return to play for the Monarchs for another year, when everything changed Jackie Robinson broke the MLB's color barrier.

=== MLB career ===
In 1947, mere months after Jackie Robinson signed with the Brooklyn Dodgers, the floundering St. Louis Browns signed both Willard Brown and Monarchs teammate Hank Thompson. This made them the third and fourth Black ballplayers in MLB history and made the St. Louis Browns the first MLB team with two Black players on their roster. The Associated Press reported at the time that of all the Black players signed by MLB teams that season, "Outfielder Brown was considered to be the prize package of the lot, with only his age against him.

On July 20th 1947, Brown and Thompson both played for St. Louis against the Boston Red Sox. This marked the first time in history that two black players appeared in an MLB game together playing for the same team.

Brown entered the baseball record books again on August 13, 1947, when he became the first African-American player to hit a home run in the American League: an inside-the-park homer off Detroit Tigers pitcher and future Hall of Famer Hal Newhouser.

Brown's time in the MLB would be unfortunately brief - after two years spent enlisted in the U.S. Army during WWII, he wasn't able to match the physical prowess he had previously shown in the Negro Leagues and in Mexico and Puerto Rico during the winter off-seasons. But the biggest obstacle was racism - St. Louis was the southernmost team in Major League Baseball at the time and Brown and Thompson faced much more discrimination and hostility from their own teammates than Jackie Robinson or Larry Doby did from their teammates on the Brooklyn Dodgers and Cleveland Indians, respectively.

Throughout the season Brown struggled from racism in his new surroundings, hitting .179 in just 21 games between July 19 and August 21 before he was released.

=== Later career ===
That winter, Brown went to Puerto Rico and had one of his greatest seasons ever, batting .432 with 27 home runs and 86 RBI in just 60 games, winning the Triple Crown and earning the nickname Ese Hombre or "That Man". He then won the Puerto Rican Winter League Triple Crown in the 1949–1950 season, and also hit for the cycle once in his career.

He returned to the Monarchs for the 1948 season (the last before the Negro leagues started to decline in terms of player quality). He played in 44 games and batted .404 while having 67 hits and 53 RBI, with the latter two topping the league totals once again (he finished second in batting average for the fourth and final time). His career home run total is not known, but he is considered to be among the Negro league career leaders in homers despite a relatively brief career.

He continued to play for a time with the Monarchs until the early 1950s while also still playing winter ball in Puerto Rico, where he won another Triple Crown in the winter of 1949-50. He played in Canada with the Border League for the Ottawa Nationals for a 30-game pennant run. He also played in the Caribbean Series in Venezuela along with summer ball in the Dominican Republic (1951–52). He then played in the Texas League and Western League from 1953 through 1956. He finished his Puerto Rico play in 1956-57; he batted .350 in his career there and was named to the Puerto Rican Baseball Hall of Fame in 1991. He played in 1957 for the Minot Mallards of the Manitoba-Dakota League before closing out his career barnstorming with the Monarchs in 1958. He then retired to his home in Houston.

== Later life and legacy ==
Brown retired with the most times leading a league in Extra-base hits with eight, later tied by Hank Aaron.

After retiring from baseball, Brown was a long time resident of Houston, Texas. He died there in 1996 at the age of 81, after suffering from Alzheimer's disease for several years. Brown was interred at Houston National Cemetery on August 12, 1996.

He was featured on several baseball cards during his playing days, including ones from Toleteros that were inserts in packages of tobacco. Buck O'Neil described Brown as the "most natural ballplayer I ever saw”.

Brown was elected to the Baseball Hall of Fame in 2006. The same year, he gained induction into the Caribbean Baseball Hall of Fame as part of their first class.

In 2013, the Bob Feller Act of Valor Award honored Brown as one of 37 Baseball Hall of Fame members for his service in the United States Army during World War II.

== See also ==
- List of Negro league baseball players who played in Major League Baseball
