= Frank Duncan (catcher) =

American baseball player (1901–1973)

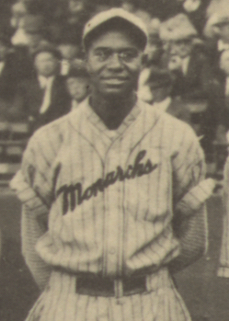
- Duncan at the 1924 Colored World Series
- Catcher
- Born: February 14, 1901; Kansas City, Missouri, U.S.
- Died: December 4, 1973 (aged 72); Kansas City, Missouri, U.S.
- Batted: Right Threw: Right

Career statistics
- Batting average: .258
- Runs batted in: 340
- Hits: 693
- Managerial record: 323–240
- Winning percentage: .574
- Stats at Baseball Reference
- Managerial record at Baseball Reference

Teams
- As player: Chicago Giants (1920–1921); Kansas City Monarchs (1921–1930); Homestead Grays (1932); New York Cubans (1935–1936); Kansas City Monarchs (1937); Chicago American Giants (1937); Kansas City Monarchs (1938); Chicago American Giants (1938, 1940); Kansas City Monarchs (1941–1945); As manager: Kansas City Monarchs (1942–1947)

Career highlights and awards
- 2× Negro World Series champion (1924, 1942); 4× Negro National League pennant (1923–1925, 1929); 4× Negro American League pennant (1937, 1941, 1942, 1946)

Frank Lee Duncan Jr (February 14, 1901 – December 4, 1973) was an American professional baseball player in the Negro leagues from 1920 to 1948. He was primarily a catcher for the Kansas City Monarchs, handling their pitching staff for over a decade. While playing part-time, he managed the Monarchs to two pennants in 1942 and 1946; he managed the Monarchs for the longest of all managers in team history with six and he won 281 games as skipper, a club record. He caught two no-hitters with the Monarchs, in 1923 and 1929.

== Playing career ==
Duncan broke in with the 1920 Chicago Giants, forcing John Beckwith to move from catcher to shortstop. He hit just .161. In 1921, Duncan moved to the Monarchs and slashed .250/.295/.277 for the combined season. In 1922, Duncan improved to .235/.317/.313 at the plate and was credited with 22 sacrifice hits to lead the Negro National League in that category. He led the NNL's catchers in fielding percentage (.984) and assists (91).

In 1923, he batted .257/.332/.332 and fielded .960 while batting second for the pennant-winning Monarchs. That winter, he played for one of the most famous Cuban Winter League teams ever, the 1923–1924 Santa Clara Leopardos. He batted .336 and slugged .401 for the club, which won the pennant with a 36–11 record.

Duncan batted .267/.358/.332 in 1924, helping the Monarchs to the second of their three consecutive pennants. He was batted only .139 (5 for 36) in the 1924 Colored World Series, won by the Monarchs in 10 games. Despite the low batting average, one of his most memorable moments as a player came in Game Eight when he singled the tying and winning runs home in a dramatic ninth-inning comeback victory by his team. The play was notable because veteran catcher Louis Santop had dropped Duncan's foul pop-up one pitch before, and his key hit went through shortstop Biz Mackey's legs. Both Mackey and Santop were considered great defensive players, though Santop's best defensive days were behind him.

Duncan hit only .200 for Santa Clara in the winter of 1924. In 1925, the catcher slipped to .222 for the Monarchs. He went 3 for 21 in the playoffs and 4 for 21 in the 1925 Negro World Series. He again had a huge moment in the series, with a great tag on Otto Briggs at home in the 11th inning of game one. Duncan batted .247 in 1926. In June, he was in the middle of a fight when he collided with John Hines. During the melee, he was struck on the back of the head by the butt of a policeman's pistol. While Duncan was down, Jelly Gardner kicked him in the mouth with his spikes.

In the winter of 1926–1927, Duncan batted .276 and slugged .328 in the California Winter League. In 1927, the Kansas City native hit .395 while splitting time with T.J. Young. Had he qualified, he would have ranked 4th in the NNL in batting average. Duncan took part in a memorable tour of Japan by Negro league players that year; the blackball stars won 23 games, tied once and lost none. The fall trip included stops in Hawaii, China, Russia and the Philippines.

In the winter of 1927–1928, Duncan was 8-for-21 with two doubles in the California Winter League.

In 1928, Duncan batted just .182. With Cienfuegos that winter, he hit .265 and slugged .434. His 8 stolen bases were second on the team behind Cool Papa Bell. Duncan hit .346 in 1929. That winter, he hit .250 for Cienfuegos and slugged .369.

Duncan hit .370 in 1930, tying for third in the NNL behind only Mule Suttles and Willie Wells. He was 5 for 13 with a triple for Cienfuegos in the 1930 CWL before the season was cut short. In the Campeonato Unico that replaced the CWL that year, he hit .276 with no extra-base hits in 29 AB for the Cienfuegos club.

Duncan hit .297 in 1931 in the Negro leagues. He moved to the Pittsburgh Crawfords in 1932 but only managed a .211 mark.

=== Later career ===
In 1935, Duncan had a .102 batting average for the New York Cubans. He followed with a .239 average in 1936 and was 0 for 3 in an exhibition against the Cincinnati Reds. In 1937, Duncan returned to Kansas City and hit .173. In the final postseason series, he was 3 for 17. He went 2 for 12 in exhibitions against white major leaguers that fall.

Duncan came back in 1938. He hit .247 for Kansas City and .378 for Chicago. His 4 triples led the Negro American League. In the 1938 East-West Game, he was 0-for-1 with a walk as the West's starting catcher and #7 hitter in a 5–4 win. He started a double play with a pick-off of Sammy T. Hughes during the game. Larry Brown took over behind the plate for Duncan. In 1939, Duncan played for a semipro team.

== Managerial career ==
He became Kansas City's playing manager in 1942, leading them to a league title, and then won the 1942 Negro World Series, sweeping the Homestead Grays four games to none.

Duncan was drafted into the United States Army for World War II after the 1942 season. He became a sergeant in the 371st Infantry Regiment of the 92nd Division. He showed off his precision by hitting 31 bull's eyes in 32 shots in rapid firing from 200 yards, a marksmanship record. He was honorably discharged early in 1943 and returned to manage the Monarchs in 1943 before the season began.

In 1944, at 43 years old, he hit .144, and the Monarchs finished last for the first time in their history, having lost much of their best players to the war. He was Jackie Robinson's first professional manager the following season. Duncan led Kansas City to the 1946 Negro World Series, which they lost in seven games to the Newark Eagles. He retired from managing after the 1947 season, turning over managerial responsibilities to Buck O'Neil.

He umpired in the NAL for a couple of years while also running a tavern after leaving baseball.

== Personal life ==
Duncan was married to noted blues singer Julia Lee. She frequently performed in all-white nightclubs, and Duncan had to sit with the orchestra, pretending to be a musician, in order to see her perform.

Duncan played alongside his son, pitcher Frank Duncan III, in 1941, and they are thought to have been the first father-son battery in professional baseball history. Duncan went 0-for-4 against Bob Feller and Ken Heintzelman in exhibitions in 1941.
