= Negro American League =

American baseball league

- Classification: Major league (to 1948)
- Sport: Negro league baseball
- First season: 1937
- Folded: 1962
- No. of teams: ~18
- Country: United States
- Most titles: Kansas City Monarchs (8)

Notes
- Declined to minor league status after integration from 1949

The Negro American League was one of the several Negro leagues created during the time organized American baseball was segregated. The league was established in 1937, and disbanded after its 1962 season.

== Negro American League franchises ==
Annual final standings: 1937, 1938, 1939, 1940, 1941, 1942, 1943, 1944, 1945, 1946, 1947, 1948

- Birmingham Black Barons (1937–1938; 1940–1962)
- Chicago American Giants (1937–1952)
- Cincinnati Tigers (1937)
- Detroit Stars (III) (1937)
- Indianapolis Athletics (1937)
- Kansas City Monarchs (1937–1962)
- Memphis Red Sox (1937–1959)
- St. Louis Stars (II) (1937)
- Atlanta Black Crackers (1938) / Indianapolis ABCs (IV) (1939)
- Jacksonville Red Caps (1938; 1941–1942) / Cleveland Bears (1939–1940)
- Indianapolis ABCs (III) (1938) / St. Louis Stars (III) (1939) / St. Louis–New Orleans Stars (1940–1941)
- Toledo Crawfords (1939) / Toledo–Indianapolis Crawfords (1940)
- Cincinnati–Cleveland Buckeyes (1942) / Cleveland Buckeyes (1943–1948; 1950) / Louisville Buckeyes (1949)
- Cincinnati Clowns (1943) / Cincinnati–Indianapolis Clowns (1944–1945) / Indianapolis Clowns (1946–1954)
- Baltimore Elite Giants (1949–1951) from the Negro National League
- Houston Eagles (formerly Newark Eagles) (1949–1950) / New Orleans Eagles (1951) from the Negro National League
- New York Cubans (1949–1950) from the Negro National League
- Philadelphia Stars (1949–1952) from the Negro National League
- Detroit Stars (1954–1957; 1959) / Detroit Clowns (1958) / Detroit–New Orleans Stars (1960)
- Louisville Clippers (1954)
- Raleigh Tigers (1959–1962)
- New Orleans Crescent Stars (1957)
- Mobile Havana Cuban Giants (1957)
- Newark Indians (Cubs) (1959)

=== Member timeline ===
Major league to 1948; minor league from 1949.

- 1937: Formation of NAL consisting of 8 teams — Birmingham Black Barons, Chicago American Giants, Cincinnati Tigers, Detroit Stars (III), Indianapolis Athletics, Kansas City Monarchs, Memphis Red Sox and St. Louis Stars (II).
- 1938: Dropped Cincinnati Tigers, Detroit Stars (III), Indianapolis Athletics and St. Louis Stars (II); Added Atlanta Black Crackers, Indianapolis ABCs (II) and Jacksonville Red Caps.
- 1939: Dropped Birmingham Black Barons; Added Toledo Crawfords.
- 1940: Dropped Indianapolis ABCs (IV); Re-added Birmingham Black Barons.
- 1941: Dropped Indianapolis Crawfords.
- 1942: Dropped St. Louis–New Orleans Stars (merged with New York Black Yankees); Added Cincinnati-Cleveland Buckeyes.
- 1943: Dropped Jacksonville Red Caps; Added Cincinnati Clowns.
- 1948: Standings and statistics were lightly reported in print starting around 1948.
- 1951: Indianapolis Clowns relocate to Buffalo, New York but retain the Indianapolis Clowns name.

== League champions ==
=== Pennant winners ===
From 1939 through 1942 and 1944 through 1947, the team in first place at the end of the season was declared the Pennant winner. Due to the unorthodox nature of the schedule (and little incentive to enforce it), some teams frequently played many more games than others did in any given season. For example, the 1937 season featured Kansas City being first place with a 52–19–1 record (.732). However, they still competed in a Championship Series, albeit against the third place team in the Chicago American Giants (36–24–1), who played more games than the 2nd place Cincinnati Tigers (35–18–1) but had one more win.

This led to some disputed championships and two teams claiming the title. Generally, the team with the best winning percentage (with some minimum number of games played) was awarded the Pennant, but other times it was the team with the most victories. The "games behind" method of recording standings was uncommon in most black leagues. From 1942 until 1948, the pennant winner (as determined by record or by postseason series victory) went on to the Negro World Series.

Pennant awarded by victory in the Championship Series

Year	Winning team	Manager	Reference
1937	Kansas City Monarchs (1)	Andy Cooper	
1938	Memphis Red Sox (1)	Ted Radcliffe	
1939	Kansas City Monarchs (2)	Andy Cooper	
1940	Kansas City Monarchs (3)	Andy Cooper	
1941	Kansas City Monarchs (4)	Newt Allen	
1942	Kansas City Monarchs (5)	Frank Duncan	
1943	Birmingham Black Barons (1)	Winfield Welch	
1944	Birmingham Black Barons (2)	Winfield Welch	
1945	Cleveland Buckeyes (1)	Quincy Trouppe	
1946	Kansas City Monarchs (6)	Frank Duncan	
1947	Cleveland Buckeyes (2)	Quincy Trouppe	
1948	Birmingham Black Barons (3)	Piper Davis	

==== Post-integration champions ====
- 1949 Baltimore Elite Giants
- 1950 Indianapolis Clowns
- 1951 Indianapolis Clowns
- 1952 Indianapolis Clowns
- 1953 Kansas City Monarchs
- 1954 Indianapolis Clowns
- 1955 Birmingham Black Barons (first half); Detroit Stars (second half)†
- 1956 Detroit Stars
- 1957 Kansas City Monarchs

† – Pennant was decided via a split-season schedule with the winner of the first half of the season playing the winner of the second half of the season.

=== League play-offs ===
On numerous occasions, the NAL split the season into two halves. The winner of the first half played the winner of the second half for the league Pennant. As mentioned above, disputes also occurred in the split season finishes. Five times a League Championship Series was played, with varying games needed to win the Series; the 1938 series ended prematurely because of problems with finding a suitable venue for the rest of the series.

Year	Winning team	Games	Losing team	Reference
1937	Kansas City Monarchs (1, 1–0)	5–1–(1)**^{T}**	Chicago American Giants (1, 0–1)	
1938	Memphis Red Sox	2–0	Atlanta Black Crackers	
1939	Kansas City Monarchs (2, 2–0)	4–1–(1)**^{T}**	St. Louis Stars	
1943	Birmingham Black Barons (1, 1–0)	3–2	Chicago American Giants (2, 0–2)	
1948	Birmingham Black Barons (2, 2–0)	4–3–(1)**^{T}**	Kansas City Monarchs (3, 2–1)	

Legend

- **^{T}** One game finished in a tied game.

=== Negro World Series ===
For the duration of the league, a Negro World Series took place seven times, from 1942 through 1948. The NAL Pennant winner met the champion of the rival Negro National League. Five out of the seven years, the Negro American League team (below in bold) succumbed.

- 1942 – **Kansas City Monarchs** beat Washington Homestead Grays, 4 games to 0 games
- 1943 – Washington Homestead Grays beat **Birmingham Black Barons**, 4 games to 3 games
- 1944 – Washington Homestead Grays beat **Birmingham Black Barons**, 4 games to 1 game
- 1945 – **Cleveland Buckeyes** beat Washington Homestead Grays, 4 games to 0 games
- 1946 – Newark Eagles beat **Kansas City Monarchs**, 4 games to 3 games
- 1947 – New York Cubans beat **Cleveland Buckeyes**, 4 games to 1 game
- 1948 – Washington Homestead Grays beat **Birmingham Black Barons**, 4 games to 1 game
