= Kansas City Monarchs =

Negro League baseball team in Kansas City, Missouri

Logo
Cap insignia

Information
- League: Negro National League (1920–1931); Independent (1932–1936); Negro American League (1937–1961); Independent (1962–1965); Based in Grand Rapids, Michigan 1956–65 but retained Kansas City as their name
- Location: Kansas City, Missouri
- Ballpark: Association Park (1920–1923); Muehlebach Field (1923–1955); a.k.a. Ruppert Stadium (1937–1942); a.k.a. Blues Stadium (1943–1954); a.k.a. Municipal Stadium (1955); Valley Field, Grand Rapids (1956–1965)
- Established: 1920
- Disbanded: 1965
- Negro World Series championships: 1924; 1942
- League titles: 1923; 1924; 1925; 1929; 1937; 1939; 1940; 1941; 1942; 1946; 1953; 1957

The Kansas City Monarchs were the longest-running franchise in the history of baseball's Negro leagues. Operating in Kansas City, Missouri, and owned by J. L. Wilkinson, they were charter members of the Negro National League from 1920 to 1930. Wilkinson was the first white owner at the time of the establishment of the team. In 1930, the Monarchs became the first professional baseball team to use a portable lighting system which was transported from game to game in trucks to play games at night, five years before any Major League Baseball team did. The Monarchs won ten league championships before integration, and triumphed in the first Negro World Series in 1924. The Monarchs had only one season in which they did not have a winning record and produced more major league players than any other Negro league franchise. After relocating to Grand Rapids, Michigan, the team was disbanded in 1965.

== Negro National League ==
The Monarchs were formed in 1920, primarily from two sources. Owner J. L. Wilkinson drew players from his All Nations barnstorming team, which had been inactive during World War I, and the 25th Infantry Wreckers, an all-black team recruited into the U.S. Army almost exclusively for their playing talent. He put together a collection of talent, including pitcher/outfielder Bullet Rogan, an eventual Hall of Famer who established himself as one of the most popular stars of the new league; sluggers Dobie Moore, Heavy Johnson, George Carr, and Hurley McNair; and pitchers Rube Curry and Cliff Bell. Immediate contenders, the Monarchs became bitter rivals to black baseball's reigning power, Rube Foster's Chicago American Giants. After three years of failing to break off the Giants' hold on the pennant, Wilkinson fired manager Sam Crawford in mid-1923, replacing him with veteran Cuban star José Méndez, who then led the Monarchs to the league championship.

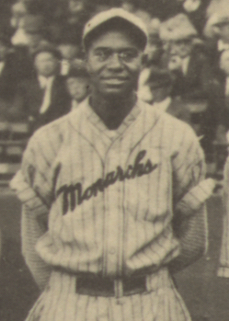
Frank Duncan, 1924 Monarchs

Winning the pennant again in 1924, the Monarchs participated in the first Negro League World Series, defeating the Eastern Colored League champion Hilldale team from Darby, Pennsylvania, in a ten-game series (five wins, four losses, and one tie). In this series, Méndez had an ERA of 1.42 in four of the games and was responsible for a shutout in the one game he was the starting pitcher in. Motivated by the Monarchs' runaway pennant victory, NNL president Rube Foster changed the league schedule to a split-season format for 1925. However, Kansas City still took the league title again in 1925, but lost the World Series to Hilldale when Rogan was injured just before the series began, winning one game and losing five. Even though Méndez was the manager, he still pitched during the few years he held the position. Among the team's regulars during these years were the second baseman/shortstop Newt Allen who in the 1924 series alone had a batting average of .282 and seven doubles and Frank Duncan. Newt Joseph played third base for the Monarchs from 1922 through their NNL years, hitting a composite .284 during that time.

In 1926 manager Méndez returned to Cuba, and Rogan took over as player/manager. He kept up the Monarchs' tradition of fine pitching, as the team's staff over the next few years featured Negro league greats including Chet Brewer, William Bell, and lefty Andy Cooper. The club traded for legendary Cuban outfielder Cristóbal Torriente, but also permanently lost the services of star shortstop Dobie Moore, whose career ended that year due to a severe off-the-field injury. After winning the first-half pennant, the Monarchs dropped a best of nine playoff to the Chicago American Giants when Rogan lost both games of a series-closing doubleheader to the young Bill Foster, another eventual Hall of Famer. In 1928 the Monarchs narrowly missed a second-half title, but won both halves of the 1929 NNL title with the best overall single-season record ever compiled by a Negro league team at 62 wins and 17 losses. By this time, pitcher Andy Cooper who had made a name for himself by playing for seven years with the Detroit Stars had joined the Monarchs. No World Series was played that year between the Monarchs and the Baltimore Black Sox, champions of the eastern American Negro League.

== J.L. Wilkinson ==
J.L. Wilkinson was the owner of the Kansas City Monarchs team from 1920 until the team was sold to Tom Baird in 1947. J.L. Wilkinson used days like "Ladies' Day" and "Kid's Day" to promote baseball and attract more players to the All Nationals Club to develop their talent and eventually be available to be placed on the Kansas City Monarch team. He was among the top businessmen and promoters for African American baseball. This helped the Kansas City Monarchs become a very stable and successful franchise. J.L. Wilkinson's Kansas City Monarchs was the only team in the Negro Leagues to play against a comedic team even after there were regulations put in place so that other teams could avoid playing against the comedic team. This comedic team wore grass skirts, war paint, and bright uniforms with a clown on the front.

== Night baseball ==
The Monarchs won four pennant championships before they introduced night baseball in the 1930s. The Kansas City Monarchs started playing night baseball to try to get more people to come to the games. The first night game was in early March, 1930 in Lawrence, Kansas. The Monarchs had portable light systems that could be transported on the team's bus to any game. The lights were powered by portable generators and attached to retractable poles. This was the first team to regularly play baseball under artificial light, including the major league teams. Night baseball gave the Monarchs more time to play more games, which also allowed them to make more profits. This increase in profits helped the Kansas City Monarchs continue to be one of the most stable franchises in the Negro Leagues.

== Barnstorming, Negro American League ==
Following the death of the original league, the Monarchs spent several years as an independent team, mostly barnstorming through the Midwest, West, and western Canada. They frequently toured with the House of David baseball team. Hall of Famers Hilton Smith, a pitcher, and Willard Brown, a slugging shortstop/outfielder with a consistent batting average of over .300, became Monarch mainstays during this time. During the 1940s, Willard Brown became the go-to home run hitter for the Monarchs. With Andy Cooper now at the helm, the Monarchs became charter members of the Negro American League (NAL) in 1937, winning the first league title. Andy Cooper was responsible for leading the Monarchs to bring home the pennant in 1939 and 1940. The Kansas City Monarchs then won the next two league championships and won winning the renewed Negro League World Series in 1942 in four straight games against the Homestead Grays.

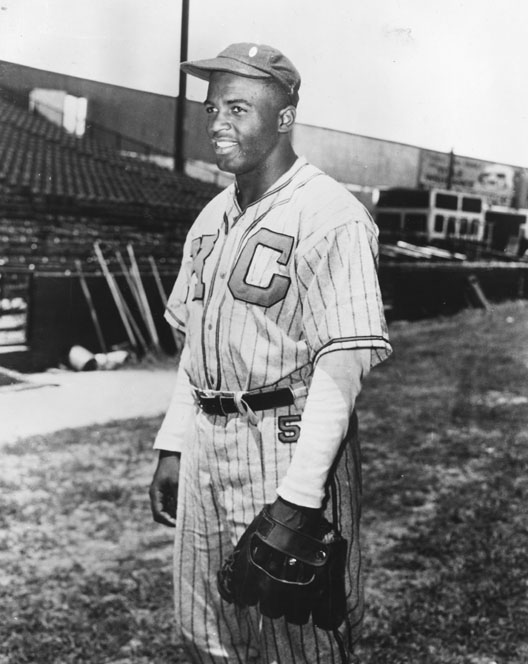
Jackie Robinson

At the start of this run the Monarchs acquired their most famous player, Hall of Fame pitcher Satchel Paige, who had since his rookie season in 1927 built a reputation as the best hurler in black baseball for the Birmingham Black Barons, Pittsburgh Crawfords, and several other teams. Suffering from an arm injury and generally thought to be done, Paige joined the Monarchs' B team in 1939; by 1940 he had recovered and been called up to the Monarchs' main squad, where he became their top drawing card. Paige was the subject of a lot of stories, both true and folklore, and became a legend to people who don't even follow baseball. For example, he was known to have known the outfielders to sit on the ground behind him while he struck out the hitter and there was someone on base that could possibly tie the game up. Paige also warmed up before pitching in a game by throwing across a gum wrapper as home plate. Paige led another superb Monarchs' staff that included fellow Hall of Famer Hilton Smith, the veteran Chet Brewer, Booker McDaniels, Jim LaMarque, and several others. They won one last NAL pennant in 1946, but lost a seven-game World Series to the Newark Eagles; in this series, they lost four games and won three.

In 1945, UCLA football star and Army lieutenant Jackie Robinson hit .387 as the Monarchs' shortstop. He became the first Monarch to make the jump to white baseball, signing with the Brooklyn Dodgers in 1946. He broke the minor league color line in 1946 with the Montreal Royals, and integrated the major leagues with the Dodgers in 1947. As baseball gradually desegregated in the late 1940s and 1950s, the Monarchs developed a niche as the foremost developer of black talent for the major leagues. The team sent more players to the majors than any other Negro league franchise, including Robinson, Paige, Ernie Banks, Elston Howard, Hank Thompson, and Willard Brown.

Newt Allen succeeded Cooper as manager in 1941, and was followed by Frank Duncan in 1942. Duncan stayed at the helm through the 1947 season winning two league titles and one world title. After Duncan stepped down, longtime first baseman Buck O'Neil took over. Then Monarchs lost the league title to the Birmingham Black Barons in 1948 which prevented them from appearing in the last Negro World Series. 1948 was also the year that Wilkinson sold the Monarchs to Tom Baird who owned the team through their minor league days in the 1950s. The Monarchs won the league's western division first-half pennant in 1949, but declined to participate in a playoff with the Chicago American Giants, as their roster was depleted by player sales to major league clubs. They won the NAL West Division title in 1950 but did not meet the eastern champion Indianapolis Clowns that year. They won a half-season pennant in 1951 but lost a playoff. O'Neil won his only two league titles in 1953 and 1955, with a last-place finish sandwiched between in 1954 as the Negro American League of the 1950s declined in quality and shrank in size, while in the process grooming a number of eventual major league players.

== Home fields and move to Grand Rapids ==
The Monarchs played their home games in the minor league Kansas City Blues' Association Park from 1920 to 1923, and moved to the Blues' new park, Muehlebach Field, in mid-1923. They mostly barnstormed in the early-to-mid-1930s, but used Muehlebach (later known as Ruppert Stadium or Blues Stadium at different times) from 1937 until 1955. They once played a game against the Brownsville Merchants at Charro Park in 1946. After a single season of scheduling games with the major league Kansas City Athletics as prime tenants of the renamed Municipal Stadium, Tom Baird sold eight players to major league clubs and four more players to minor league teams, released his manager, Buck O'Neil, who then signed on as a scout for the Chicago Cubs, and then sold the franchise to baseball entrepreneur Ted Rasberry, who moved its base to Grand Rapids, Michigan, though retaining the name "Kansas City Monarchs". From 1956 on, the Monarchs were a full-time barnstorming team. The Negro American League ceased operations in 1962, and the Monarchs finally disbanded after the 1965 season. In Grand Rapids, the Monarchs Played at Valley Field, located at 700 Valley Ave NW, near where Sullivan Field is today.

== Minor league affiliate ==
The Kansas City Monarchs were one of a few Negro league teams that informally employed a farm team. The Monroe Monarchs played from the late 1920s to 1935, mostly as a minor league team loosely associated with Kansas City.

== Players ==
=== Baseball Hall of Famers ===
Players and managers listed in bold are depicted on their Hall of Fame plaques wearing a Monarchs cap insignia. An asterisk (*) denotes the player is depicted on Hall of Fame plaque without a cap insignia or with the cap insignia obscured but the Hall of Fame recognizes Monarchs as "Primary Team"

Kansas City Monarchs Hall of Famers
Inductee	Position	Tenure	Inducted
Ernie Banks	SS/1B	1950–1953	1977
Cool Papa Bell	CF	1932	1974
**Willard Brown**	OF	1935–1944; 1946–1949	2006
Andy Cooper	P	1928–1929, 1931; 1933–1939	2006
Bill Foster	P	1931	1996
José Méndez	P	1917, 1920–1926	2006
Buck O'Neil	Executive	1938-1943, 1946-1955	2022
**Satchel Paige***	P	1935, 1940–1947	1971
Jackie Robinson	2B	1945	1962
Bullet Rogan	P/OF	1920–1930; 1933–1938	1998
**Hilton Smith***	P	1937–1948	2001
Turkey Stearnes	OF	1931, 1934; 1938–1940	2000
Cristobal Torriente	OF	1916–1917, 1926	2006
Willie Wells	SS	1932	1997
**J.L. Wilkinson***	Founder	1920–1947	2006

=== Other notable players ===
- Toni Stone (1954); first woman to play in the negro leagues (1953); she was traded from the Indianapolis Clowns to the Monarchs in the 1950s.
- Elston Howard (1948–1950) 12 time MLB All-Star; 1963 AL Most Valuable Player.
- Quincy Trouppe (1932, 1935)
- Sam Bankhead utility man; highly valued.

== Legacy ==
In February 2021, the team's name was revived by a Kansas City, Kansas, minor league team, the Kansas City T-Bones. The name was approved through a negotiation with the Negro Leagues Baseball Museum.

=== MLB throwback jerseys ===
The Kansas City Royals have honored the Monarchs by wearing replica uniforms during regular-season baseball games on several occasions, including July 14, 2001 (at Pittsburgh), July 1, 2007, and May 30, 2009 (at home vs. White Sox), June 9, 2012 (at Pittsburgh), July 21, 2012, and June 23, 2019 (both at home vs. Minnesota), August 24, 2013 (at home vs. Washington Nationals), May 18, 2014 (at home vs. Baltimore), May 17, 2015 (at home vs. New York Yankees), May 15, 2016 (at home vs. Atlanta), May 7, 2017 (at home vs. Cleveland), and August 13, 2022 (at home vs. Los Angeles Dodgers). Throwback jerseys worn during Royals home games have typically been auctioned as a fundraiser for the Negro Leagues Baseball Museum.

== See also ==
- Category:Kansas City Monarchs players - full list of Monarch players
- Kansas City Monarchs (2021–present) - Independent baseball team that adopted the team's name, originally known as the Kansas City T-Bones

== Additional references ==
- Only the Ball was White by Robert Peterson (1970) Publisher: Prentice-Hall (Englewood Cliffs NJ) ISBN 0-19-507637-0
- The Kansas City Monarchs by Janet Bruce-Campbell {1985} Publisher: University Press of Kansas (Lawrence KS) ISBN 0-7006-0343-3
- The Monarchs 1920–1938, Featuring Wilber "Bullet" Rogan by Phil S. Dixon {2002} Publisher: Mariah Press (Sioux Falls SD) ISBN 1-893250-08-3
- The Negro Leagues Book edited by Dick Clark & Larry Lester {1994} Publisher: The Society for American Baseball Research (Cleveland OH) ISBN 0-910137-55-2
- The Complete Book of Baseball's Negro Leagues by John B. Holway {2001} Publisher: Hastings House ISBN 0-8038-2007-0
- Black America Series Black Baseball in Kansas Cityby Larry Lester and Sammy J. Miller (2000) Publisher: Arcadia Publishing (Charleston, SC) ISBN 978-0-7385-0842-9
- Tye, Larry (2009), Satchel: The Life and Times of an American Legend, New York: Random House, ISBN 978-1-4000-6651-3
