= Baltimore Elite Giants all-time roster =

The following is the list of players on the Baltimore Elite Giants all-time roster. These are Baltimore Elite Giants players who appeared in at least one game for the Elite Giants, based in either Nashville, Columbus, Washington or Baltimore, or for the Nashville Standard Giants from 1919 to 1951.

On-going research continuously discovers unreported or misreported games (and the affected players), while some games and players may be lost forever. Therefore, some Negro league players' affiliations will likely remain incomplete and possibly disputed.

‡ Bold player inducted as a member of the National Baseball Hall of Fame and Museum.

== A–D ==
Player	Year(s)	Position(s)	Ref
Emery Adams	1939–1942	P	
Bill Anderson	1930	OF	
Jimmie Armstead	1940, 1946	OF	
Raymond Austin	1930	P	
Percy Bailey	1933	P	
Sam Bankhead	1932–1934	OF / SS	
Bud Barbee	1940, 1943	1B / P	
Bill Barnes	1940–1942, 1946	P	
Eddie Berry	1943	P	
Jimmy Binder	1936	3B	
Charlie Biot	1940–1941	OF	
Joe Black	1943–1950	P	
Willie Bobo	1929–1930	1B	
Oscar Boone	1939	C	
Jesse Brown	1940–1942	P	
Ted Brown	1943	SS	
Black Bottom Buford	1929–1932	2B / 3B	
Ernest Burke	1946–1948	P	
Willie Burns	1943	P	
Pee Wee Butts	1939–1942, 1944–1948	SS	
Bill Byrd	1935–1939, 1941–1950	P	
Cyril Byron	1946	C	
Roy Campanella‡	1937–1942, 1944–1945	C	
Joe Campini	1948	C	
Richard Cannon	1931–1932	P	
Mickey Casey	1942	—	
Leonardo Chapman	1944	1B	
Thad Christopher	1936, 1943	OF	
Bob Clarke	1941–1946	C	
Zack Clayton	1945	1B	
Comer Cox	1930–1931	OF	
Goose Curry	1933, 1936, 1939–1941	OF	
Ray Dandridge‡	1933	SS	
Charley Davidson	1940	P	
Butch Davis	1947	OF	
Ross Davis	1940	P	
Leon Day‡	1949–1950	P	
Art Demery	1941	OF	
Doc Dennis	1942–1945, 1951	1B	
Jimmy Direaux	1937–1938	P	
Eddie Dixon	1940	P	
James Dudley	1940–1947	C	
Frank Duncan	1945	P	
Tommie Dukes	1932–1934	C	

== E–L ==
Player	Year(s)	Position(s)	Ref
Jesse Edwards	1929–1930	2B / OF	
Louis English	1930	C	
Toots Ferrell	1948–1951	P	
Tite Figueroa	1946	P	
Ed Finney	1947–1948	3B	
Jimmy Ford	1938	3B	
Jonas Gaines	1937–1939, 1941–1942, 1944–1948	P	
Jim Gilliam	1946–1950	2B	
Tom Glover	1935, 1937–1939, 1942–1945	P	
Jim Gray	1929	3B	
Bob Griffith	1934–1938, 1941	P	
Felix Guilbe	1946–1947	OF	
Paul Hardy	1934–1935	C	
Bill Harvey	1939, 1942–1946	P / OF	
Rufus Hatten	1946	C	
Henry Henderson	1932	1B	
Leonard Henderson	1930, 1932	3B	
Joe Hewitt	1929–1932	IF / OF	
Archie Hinton	1945–1946	P	
Ulysses Hollimon	1951	P	
Crush Holloway	1939	OF	
Lefty Holmes	1936	P	
Frog Holsey	1932	P	
Bill Hoskins	1938–1946	OF	
Willie Hubert	1939–1940	P	
Sammy T. Hughes	1933–1940, 1942, 1946	2B	
Charlie Humber	1943	—	
Tom Jackson	1929	P	
Al Johnson	1936	P	
Johnny A. Johnson	1939	P	
Jim Jones	1943	OF	
Henry Kimbro	1937–1940, 1942–1951	OF	
Milt Laurent	1927, 1932	OF	
Clarence Lewis	1934	SS / OF	
Red Longley	1936	OF / 2B	
Lester Lockett	1947–1948	OF / 3B	
Kid Lowe	1930	3B	
Granville Lyons	1932, 1934, 1938, 1942	1B	

== M–R ==
Player	Year(s)	Position(s)	Ref
Biz Mackey‡	1936–1939	C	
William Makell	1943	C	
Ziggy Marcell	1940, 1947	C	
Luis Márquez	1946	OF	
Bailey McCauley	1930	P	
Butch McCord	1948–1950	OF	
Bob Miller	1932	2B	
Percy Miller	1930, 1933–1934	P	
Art Milton	1943	1B	
Bud Mitchell	1935	P	
James Moore	1939–1940	1B	
Nate Moreland	1940, 1945	P	
Sack Morgan	1945	P	
Leroy Morney	1935–1937	SS / 2B / 3B	
Al Morris	1929–1930	OF	
Cowboy Murray	1940, 1943	P	
George Nash	1932	P	
Albert Owens	1930	P	
Judge Owens	1943	2B	
Graham Pace	1930	OF	
Red Parnell	1934–1935	OF	
Clyde Parris	1946	2B	
Lennie Pearson	1949	1B	
José Pereira	1947	P	
Bill Perkins	1940, 1947–1948	C	
Shirley Petway	1932	—	
Lefty Phillips	1939–1940	P	
Andrew Porter	1932–1938, 1942–1946	P	
Jimmy Reese	1940	P	
Gene Richardson	1951	P	
Jack Ridley	1929–1933	OF	
Charlie Rivera	1939	3B	
Bobby Robinson	1934	3B	
Frazier Robinson	1943, 1946–1950	C	
Norman Robinson	1939–1940, 1943–1946	OF / 3B	
Bob Romby	1946–1950	P	
Frank Russell	1943–1944, 1946, 1948	2B / OF / 3B	

== S–Z ==
Player	Year(s)	Position(s)	Ref
Lloyd Scott	1934	2B	
Freddie Shepard	1943	3B	
Hubert Simmons	1950–1951	P / OF	
Bob Smith	1932–1933	C	
Felton Snow	1933–1947	3B / SS / 2B	
Clyde Sowell	1948	P	
Willie Spearman	1929	P	
Joe Spencer	1943	2B	
Frank Stewart	1936	P	
Manuel Stewart	1946	3B	
Ossie Stewart	1943	P	
Lonnie Summers	1938	OF	
Jamuel Tarrant	1945	P	
Roosevelt Tate	1932	OF	
Candy Jim Taylor	1933–1936	—	
Sam Thompson	1935	P	
Clarence Trealkill	1929	SS	
Donald Troy	1944–1945	P	
Lefty Turner	1942	1B	
Luis Villodas	1946–1947	C	
Arnold Waites	1937	P	
Hoss Walker	1932–1940, 1948	SS	
Tony Walker	1944–1945	P	
Johnny Washington	1941, 1946–1948	1B	
Amos Watson	1947	P	
Willie Wells‡	1946	3B	
Jim West	1933–1940	1B	
Clarence White	1929–1930	P	
Joe Wiggins	1930	3B	
Joe Wiley	1947	3B / 2B	
Biggie Williams	1943	OF	
Harry Williams	1945	2B	
Nish Williams	1929–1930, 1932–1937	C / OF	
Poindexter Williams	1930, 1933	C	
Woody Williams	1937, 1939–1940	P	
Jim Willis	1929–1930, 1932–1937, 1939	P	
Alfred Wilmore	1948–1950	P	
Woodrow Wilson	1936	P	
Bill Wright	1932–1939, 1942, 1945	OF	
Henry Wright	1929–1935	P	
Zollie Wright	1935–1937	OF	
Laymon Yokely	1944	P	
Harvey Young	1943	SS	
Jim Zapp	1945–1946, 1950–1951, 1954	OF / 3B	
