= 1949 Baltimore Elite Giants season =

1949 Baltimore Elite Giants
- League: Negro American League
- Ballpark: Bugle Field
- City: Baltimore
- League place: 1st
- Owners: Vernon Green
- Managers: Hoss Walker, Lennie Pearson

The 1949 Baltimore Elite Giants baseball team represented the Baltimore Elite Giants in the Negro American League (NAL) during the 1949 baseball season. The team won the NAL pennant. Hoss Walker and Lennie Pearson were the team's managers. The team's owner, Vernon Green, died of a heart attack in late May 1949. The team played its home games at Bugle Field in Baltimore.

Players included

- Harry Bayliss
- Joe Black
- Pee Wee Butts
- Bill Byrd
- John Davidson
- Butch Davis
- Leon Day
- Leroy Ferrell
- Junior Gilliam
- Vic Harris
- Johnny Hayes
- Henry Kimbro
- Lester Lockett
- Butch McCord
- Lennie Pearson
- Frazier Robinson
- Sylvester Rogers
- Bob Romby
- Frank Russell
- Hoss Walker
- Alfred Wilmore
