= List of Baltimore Elite Giants seasons =

This list of Baltimore Elite Giants seasons compiles games played by the Baltimore Elite Giants. Seasons in which the Elite Giants were league members (or an associate team), only games that counted in official league standings are included. Seasons in which they had no league membership and played an independent/barnstorming schedule include games against primarily major-league-caliber teams.

Contemporary coverage of games and won-loss standings was spotty and inconsistent. On-going research continuously discovers unreported or misreported games, while some games are probably lost forever. Therefore, Negro league seasonal finishes will likely remain incomplete and subjective.

== Year by year ==
Negro World Series Champions (1924–1927 & 1942–1948) *	League champions ‡	Other playoff ^

Season	Level	League	Season finish		Games	Wins	Loses	Ties	Win% (Note: Placement in annual standings were generally decided by win percentage; "games behind" were never used.)	Postseason	Ref
Season	Level	League	Full (Note: Finish in years when only a full season was indicates actual place in standings. Finish in years a split season was played indicates combined place in standings for both halves of the season.)	Split (Note: Years with a "—" did not play a split season. "1st" or 2nd" indicate which half of the season was won. "DNQ" indicates team did not win either half and did not qualify for postseason.)	Games	Wins	Loses	Ties	Win%	Postseason	Ref
Nashville Standard Giants
1920	Independent	—	—	—							
Nashville Elite Giants
1921‡	Minor	NSL	1	—	118	72	46	0	.610	Won NSL playoff (Montgomery Grey Sox^{2nd}) 4–1	
1922‡	Minor	NSL	1	—	71	47	24	0	.662	Won pennant outright	
1923	Minor	NSL	4	—	7	0	7	0	.000		
1924	Independent	—	—	—							
1925	Independent	—	—	—							
1926	Minor	NSL	—	5	26	11	15	0	.423		
1926	Minor	NSL	—	6	36	15	21	0	.417		
1927	Minor	NSL	2	—	27	18	9	0	.667		
1928	Independent	—	—	—							
1929‡	Independent	—	—	—	40	14	22	4	.389		
1929‡	Minor	NSL	1	—	12	9	3	0	.750	Won pennant outright	
1930	Major	NNL1	9	DNQ	82	26	55	1	.321		
1931‡	Minor	NSL	1	—	33	22	11	0	.667	Won pennant outright	
1932^	Major	NSL	4	2nd	47	24	23	0	.511	Lost NSL split-season playoff (Chicago American Giants^{1}) 4–3	
1933	Major	NNL2	4	—	42	19	22	1	.463		
1934	Major	NNL2	5	DNQ	47	18	28	1	.391		
Columbus Elite Giants
1935	Major	NNL2	3	DNQ	55	29	24	2	.547		
Washington Elite Giants
1936^	Major	NNL2	5	2nd	64	29	34	1	.460	Declared NNL split-season runner-up to (Pittsburgh Crawfords^{1})	
1937	Major	NNL2	5	—	62	23	36	3	.390		
Baltimore Elite Giants
1938	Major	NNL2	3	—	52	26	23	3	.531		
1939‡	Major	NNL2	4	—	44	21	23	0	.477	Won NNL tournament (Homestead Grays^{1st}) 3–1–1; Won 1st round of NNL tournament (Newark Eagles^{2nd}) 3–1	
1940	Major	NNL2	2	—	55	32	23	0	.582		
1941	Major	NNL2	2	DNQ	68	44	24	0	.647		
1942	Major	NNL2	2	—	66	38	27	1	.585		
1943	Major	NNL2	5	—	47	18	26	3	.409		
1944	Major	NNL2	4	DNQ	72	34	38	0	.472		
1945	Major	NNL2	3	DNQ	70	36	32	2	.529		
1946	Major	NNL2	2	DNQ	75	38	34	3	.528		
1947	Major	NNL2	3	—	83	41	40	2	.506		
1948^	Major	NNL2	2	1st	76	46	28	2	.622	Lost NNL split-season playoff (Homestead Grays^{2}) 2–1–1	
1949‡	Minor	NAL	1 (E)	—	89	59	30	0	.633	Won NAL split-season playoff (Homestead Grays^{W}) ?–?	
1950	Minor	NAL	2 (E)	—	45	24	20	1	.545		
1951	Minor	NAL	2 (E)	—	64	28	36	0	.438		

Key
