= 1939 Baltimore Elite Giants season =

1939 Baltimore Elite Giants
- League: Negro National League
- Ballpark: Oriole Park
- City: Baltimore
- Record: 24–24 (.500)
- League place: 1st
- Managers: Felton Snow

The 1939 Baltimore Elite Giants baseball team represented the Baltimore Elite Giants in the Negro National League during the 1939 baseball season. The Elite Giants compiled a 24–24 (.500) record and won the Negro National League championship. The team played its home games at Oriole Park in Baltimore.

Two players from the 1939 team were later inducted into the Baseball Hall of Fame, including catcher Roy Campanella.

The team's leading batters were:

- Left fielder Bill Hoskins - .382 batting average, .528 slugging percentage
- Second baseman Sammy T. Hughes - .378 batting average, .500 slugging percentage
- Right fielder Wild Bill Wright - .365 batting average, .458 slugging percentage
- Center fielder Henry Kimbro - .313 batting average, .446 slugging percentage

The team's leading pitchers were Bill Byrd (7–2 record, 3.32 ERA) and Willie Hubert (3–1, 1.11 ERA).
