= Milt Laurent =

American baseball player (1901–1995)

- Outfielder
- Born: December 26, 1901; New Orleans, Louisiana, U.S.
- Died: October 25, 1995 (aged 93); New Orleans, Louisiana, U.S.
- Batted: Right Threw: Right

Negro leagues debut
- 1921, for the New Orleans Crescent Stars

Last Negro leagues appearance
- 1937, for the New Orleans Crescent Stars

Negro leagues (Note: On December 16, 2020, Major League Baseball declared certain Negro leagues, from the span of 1920–1948, to be "major" leagues. Laurent's statistics reflect his time in the Negro leagues from 1929–1932.) statistics
- Batting average: .234
- Home runs: 3
- Runs batted in: 78

Teams
- New Orleans Crescent Stars (1921–1922); New Orleans Ads (1923); New Orleans Black Pelicans (1923–1926); Nashville Elite Giants (1927); Memphis Red Sox (1928–1930); Birmingham Black Barons (1929); Cleveland Cubs (1931–1932); Nashville Elite Giants (1932); Birmingham Black Barons (1932); New Orleans Crescent Stars (1933–1937)

Milfred Stephen Laurent (December 26, 1901 – October 25, 1995), nicknamed "Rick", was an American Negro league outfielder in the 1920s and 1930s.

A native of New Orleans, Louisiana, Milfred Stephen Laurent was born as the son of Paul Laurent and Augustine Sarrazin. Laurent broke into the Negro leagues in 1921 with the New Orleans Crescent Stars. He went on to play for several teams over a 17-year career, concluding his career back with the Crescent Stars from 1933 to 1937. He was inducted into the Greater New Orleans Sports Hall of Fame in 1980, and died in New Orleans in 1995 at age 93.
