= Eddie Berry =

Eddie Berry may refer to:

- Eddie Berry (pitcher) (1918–1981), American Negro Leagues pitcher
- Eddie Berry (shortstop), American Negro Leagues shortstop
