= Nish Williams =

American baseball player (1904-1968)

- Catcher
- Born: February 29, 1904; Columbus, Georgia, U.S.
- Died: September 2, 1968 (aged 64); Atlanta, Georgia, U.S.
- Batted: Right Threw: Right

Negro league baseball debut
- 1930, for the Nashville Elite Giants

Last appearance
- 1939, for the Indianapolis ABCs/Atlanta Black Crackers
- Managerial record at Baseball Reference

Teams
- As player: Nashville Elite Giants (1930); Cleveland Cubs (1931); Nashville/Columbus/Washington Elite Giants (1932–1937); Atlanta Black Crackers (1938); Indianapolis ABCs/Atlanta Black Crackers (1939); As manager: Atlanta Black Crackers (1938)

Vinicius James Williams (February 29, 1904 – September 2, 1968) was an American Negro league catcher between 1928 and 1939.

A native of Columbus, Georgia, Williams moved to Atlanta as a child and later attended Morehouse College. He made his Negro leagues debut in 1928 with the Nashville Elite Giants. With the exception of a one-year stint with the Cleveland Cubs in 1931, Williams played for the Elite Giants through 1937, as the team's home moved from Nashville to Columbus and Washington. He joined the Atlanta Black Crackers as player-manager in 1938, was relieved of his managerial duties mid-season, and remained with that club when it moved to Indianapolis in 1939. Williams married the mother of baseball great Donn Clendenon, and was instrumental in Clendenon's early baseball development.

In 1968, the Atlanta Braves broke an unwritten rule by inviting Williams and several other Negro leaguers to play in their old-timers' game. He described the experience as a dream come true. Williams was a restaurateur in Atlanta for decades before his death from cancer on September 2, 1968.
