= George Nash =

George Nash may refer to:

- George K. Nash (1842–1904), American politician
- George Nash (cricketer) (1850–1903), English cricketer
- George Valentine Nash (1864–1921), American botanist
- George Nash (actor), actor in American films including The Jungle (1914 film)
- George Nash (baseball) (1907–1976), American baseball player
- George H. Nash (born 1945), American historian of conservatism
- George Nash (rower) (born 1989), English rower
