= Comer Cox =

American baseball player

- Outfielder
- Born: May 9, 1905; Athens, Alabama, U.S.
- Died: August, 1971; Springfield, Illinois, U.S.
- Batted: Right Threw: Right

Negro league baseball debut
- 1930, for the Nashville Elite Giants

Last appearance
- 1931, for the Cleveland Cubs
- Stats at Baseball Reference

Teams
- Nashville Elite Giants (1930); Cleveland Cubs (1931)

Comer Lane Cox (May 9, 1905 – August, 1971) was an American Negro league outfielder in 1930 and 1931.

A native of Athens, Alabama, Cox attended Sumner High School in St. Louis, Missouri, and Fisk University. He spent two seasons in the Negro leagues, playing for the Nashville Elite Giants in 1930, and the Cleveland Cubs in 1931. After his baseball career, Cox settled in Springfield, Illinois, where he became the director of the Springfield Urban League. He died in Springfield in 1971 at age 66, and in 1976, the city's Comer Cox Park was named in his memory.
