= Jim Willis (1930s pitcher) =

American baseball player (born 1906)

- Pitcher
- Born: June 11, 1906; Louisiana, U.S.
- Threw: Right

Negro league baseball debut
- 1926, for the New Orleans Algiers

Last appearance
- 1939, for the Baltimore Elite Giants

Teams
- New Orleans Algiers (1926); Birmingham Black Barons (1928); Nashville Elite Giants (1929–1930); Cleveland Cubs (1931); Nashville Elite Giants (1932–1934); Philadelphia Stars (1933); Columbus Elite Giants (1935); Washington Elite Giants (1936–1937); Baltimore Elite Giants (1939)

Career highlights and awards
- Negro National League ERA leader (1936)

Ed "Jim" Willis Jr. (June 11, 1906 – death date unknown) was an American professional baseball pitcher in the Negro leagues in the 1920s and 1930s.

Willis made his Negro leagues debut in 1926 with the New Orleans Algiers. In 1929, he joined the Nashville Elite Giants, and spent the majority of his career with the club, as it moved from Nashville to Cleveland, Columbus, Washington, and finally Baltimore, where Willis finished his career in 1939.
