= List of Coppin State Eagles men's basketball head coaches =

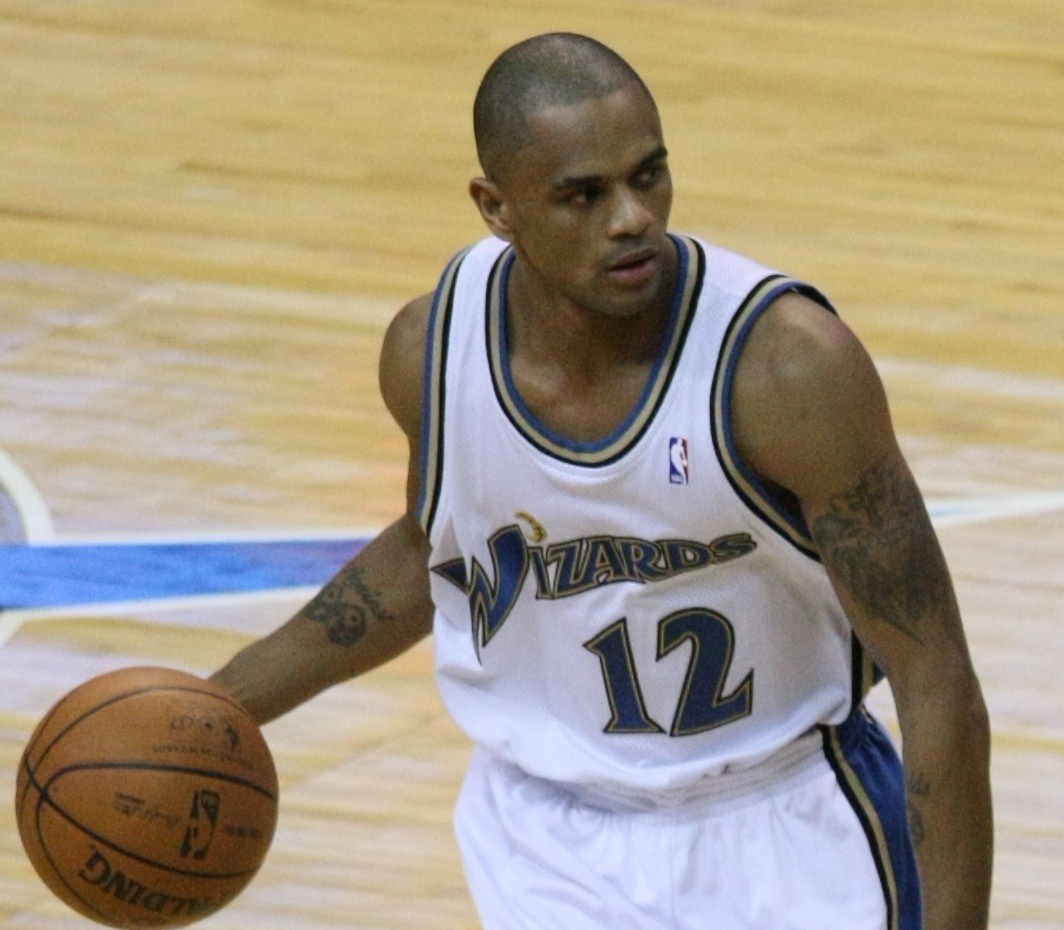
Juan Dixon, the replacing head coach of the Coppin State Eagles.

The following is a list of Coppin State Eagles men's basketball head coaches. There have been seven head coaches of the Eagles in their 59-season history.

Coppin State's most recent head coach is Larry Stewart. He was hired as the Eagles' head coach in March 2023, replacing Juan Dixon, who was fired after the 2022–23 season.

No.	Tenure	Coach	Years	Record	Pct.
1	1964–1965	Cyril Byron	1	1–13	.071
2	1965–1970	Joseph Jones	5	44–49	.473
3	1970–1974	Charles Hardnett	4	59–39	.602
4	1974–1986	John Bates	12	209–121	.633
5	1986–2014	Fang Mitchell	28	429–417	.507
6	2014–2017	Michael Grant	3	26–69	.274
7	2017–2023	Juan Dixon	6	51–131	.280
8	2023–present	Larry Stewart	1	0–0	–
Totals		8 coaches	59 seasons	819–839	.494
Records updated through end of 2022–23 season Source
