= Woody Williams (disambiguation) =

Woody Williams (born 1966) is an American retired baseball pitcher.

Woody Williams may also refer to:

- Woody Williams (infielder) (1912–1995), American baseball player
- Woody Williams (pitcher, born 1918) (1918–1990), American baseball player
- Hershel W. Williams (1923–2022), World War II Medal of Honor recipient
