= Joe Wiggins (baseball) =

American baseball player

- Third baseman
- Born: September 19, 1906; Dinwiddie County, Virginia, U.S.
- Died: October 25, 1984 (aged 78); Cleveland, Ohio, U.S.
- Threw: Right

Negro league baseball debut
- 1930, for the Nashville Elite Giants

Last appearance
- 1934, for the Bacharach Giants

Teams
- Nashville Elite Giants (1930); Cleveland Cubs (1931); Baltimore Black Sox (1932); New York Black Yankees (1933); Bacharach Giants (1933–1934)

Joseph Clifton Wiggins (September 19, 1906 – October 25, 1984), also known as "Joe Chevalier", and nicknamed "Jumping Joe", was an American Negro league third baseman in the 1930s.

== Early life and careers ==
A native of Dinwiddie County, Virginia, Wiggins attended Virginia State University, Atlanta University, and Fisk University. He made his Negro leagues debut in 1930 for the Nashville Elite Giants, and played for several teams through 1934. Wiggins died in Cleveland, Ohio in 1984 at age 78.
