= Bill Perkins (baseball) =

American baseball player (1906–1958)

- Catcher / Corner outfielder
- Born: June 26, 1906; Dawson, Georgia, U.S.
- Died: January 24, 1958 (aged 51); Birmingham, Alabama, U.S.
- Batted: Right Threw: Right

Negro league baseball debut
- 1928, for the Birmingham Black Barons

Last appearance
- 1948, for the Baltimore Elite Giants

Teams
- Birmingham Black Barons (1928); Brooklyn Royal Giants (1929); Birmingham Black Barons (1930); Cleveland Cubs (1931); Baltimore Black Sox (1931); Pittsburgh Crawfords (1931–1936); Cleveland Stars (1932); Homestead Grays (1932); Santo Domingo Stars (1937); Philadelphia Stars (1938–1939); Baltimore Elite Giants (1940); Diablos Rojos del Mexico (1941); Industriales de Monterrey (1942); Birmingham Black Barons (1945); New York Black Yankees (1945-1946); Philadelphia Stars (1946); Baltimore Elite Giants (1947–1948)

Career highlights and awards
- 2× All-Star (1934, 1940)

William Gamiel Perkins (June 26, 1906 – January 24, 1958) was an American professional baseball catcher and corner outfielder who played in the Negro leagues and the Mexican League from 1928 to 1948 with several teams.

A native of Albany, Georgia, Perkins is best known for being "Satchel Paige's personal catcher throughout his career" and wearing a chest protector that read, "Thou shalt not steal!" While playing for the Pittsburgh Crawfords, Perkins served as Hall of Famer Josh Gibson's backup catcher; but, even as backup catcher, he was the one to whom Paige most often threw his fastballs. He played in two East-West All-Star Games, in 1934 and 1940.

Perkins was one of the "jumpers" who jumped to Santo Domingo when tropical countries started summer seasons in competition with American leagues. He was temporarily suspended from playing in the United States in 1938, but the suspension was short and he then signed with the Philadelphia Stars. He served in the US Army during World War II, and was shot in a restaurant in 1948 with very limited details about the event.
