= Raymond Austin (baseball) =

- Pitcher
- Batted: Unknown Threw: Unknown

Negro league baseball debut
- 1930, for the Nashville Elite Giants

Last appearance
- 1932, for the Atlanta Black Crackers
- Stats at Baseball Reference

Teams
- Nashville Elite Giants (1930); Birmingham Black Barons (1930); Atlanta Black Crackers (1932)

Raymond "Tank" Austin was an American professional baseball pitcher in the Negro leagues. He played with the Nashville Elite Giants and Birmingham Black Barons in 1930 and the Atlanta Black Crackers in 1932.

== Career ==
Austin started the first game of the 1930 Negro National League season for the Nashville Elite Giants. He was relieved by Bailey McCauley in a losing effort against the St. Louis Stars.

His final recorded game came with the Atlanta Black Crackers in 1932, when he faced the Montgomery Grey Sox on June 19, 1932. He pitched either four or five innings, depending on the source, in a losing effort.
