= Lloyd Scott (disambiguation) =

Lloyd Scott (1961–2026) was an English fundraiser for charities and former footballer.

Lloyd Scott may also refer to:

- Lloyd Scott (musician) (1902–1959), American jazz musician
- Lloyd Scott (baseball) (1910–1973), American baseball player in the 1930s
