= Henry Wright (baseball) =

American baseball player

- Pitcher
- Born: December 16, 1906; Columbia, Tennessee, U.S.
- Died: August 27, 1960 (aged 53); Nashville, Tennessee, U.S.
- Threw: Right

Negro league baseball debut
- 1929, for the Nashville Elite Giants

Last appearance
- 1935, for the Columbus Elite Giants

Teams
- Nashville Elite Giants (1929–1930); Cleveland Cubs (1931); Nashville Elite Giants (1932–1934); Columbus Elite Giants (1935)

Henry Lewis Wright (December 16, 1906 – August 27, 1960), nicknamed "Red", was an American Negro league pitcher between 1929 and 1935.

A native of Columbia, Tennessee, Wright made his Negro leagues debut in 1929 for the Nashville Elite Giants. He played for the team through 1935, as the franchise moved from Nashville to Cleveland and Columbus.
