= Jim Zapp =

American baseball player (1924–2016)

- Left fielder
- Born: April 18, 1924; Nashville, Tennessee, U.S.
- Died: September 30, 2016 (aged 92); Harker Heights, Texas, U.S.
- Batted: Right Threw: Right

Negro leagues debut
- 1945, for the Baltimore Elite Giants

Last Negro leagues appearance
- 1954, for the Birmingham Black Barons

Teams
- Baltimore Elite Giants (1945–1946, 1950–1951, 1954); Nashville Cubs (1946); Atlanta Black Crackers (1947); Birmingham Black Barons (1948, 1954)

James Stephen Zapp (April 18, 1924 – September 30, 2016), nicknamed "Zipper", was an American professional baseball outfielder who played baseball in the Negro leagues and minor leagues from 1945 to 1955. Spending the majority of his career with the Baltimore Elite Giants, Zapp is described as an above-average power and contact hitter. When Zapp began playing in integrated baseball with the Paris Lakers of the Mississippi-Ohio Valley League, he broke the league's RBI record total for a single-season, which still stands today.

== Early life and military service ==
Born in Nashville, Tennessee, Zapp, as an adolescent, attended a Catholic school which did not provide a baseball program. Although he occasionally played softball as a teenager, his relationship with baseball began by an unusual approach—after he enlisted in the United States Navy in 1942, Zapp joined a segregated military team while stationed in Pearl Harbor, Hawaii. Impressed with his performance on the field, coach Edgar "Special Delivery" Jones—a former running-back in the NFL—transferred Zapp to his white team, making him and first baseman Andy Ashford the only two black players to join the integrated line-up. During his stint, Zapp contributed to back-to-back titles in the 1943 and 1944 seasons. Zapp remained active in navy baseball until 1945, when the Second World War came to a close and he was honorably discharged.

== Baseball career ==
While stationed at Staten Island, New York, Zapp was signed by the Baltimore Elite Giants as a backup corner outfielder, initially on a weekend basis, then full-time for the winter season. In 1946, he returned home and joined the Nashville Cubs. The following year, Zapp played for the Atlanta Black Crackers, showing a hint of his power hitting by knocking 11 home runs in half a season. Frustrated by the team's inability to pay its players, Zapp abandoned the Black Crackers, jumping off the team bus in New York City to share housing with family. Incidentally, Zapp was branded as temperamental although he "didn't call it temperamental," he told reporter Brent Kelly, "If I didn't think the owners was treating me right, I'd quit, ask for my release, or whatever, as long as they didn't give me my money. Sometimes they did not". Zapp surmises his decision later denied him an opportunity to play in integrated Major League Baseball. As he stood in front of a nightclub in New York City, Zapp was recognized by a talent scout, and signed to join the Birmingham Black Barons in 1948.

Entering his fourth professional season, Zapp earned the position of the Barons' starting left-outfielder, playing alongside Willie Mays. Although accurate statistics were not kept, Zapp is considered as an above-average power and contact hitter, batting over .300 for the duration of his career. When Norm Robinson, the center-outfielder before Mays, returned to the Black Barons after recovering from a leg injury, he was inserted into left field to utilize his defensive prowess, briefly displacing Zapp from the everyday line-up. Despite his diminished role, he played a crucial part in leading the team to winning Negro American League pennant in seven games against the Kansas City Monarchs. Zapp, in what he considers the highlight moment of his career, hit a walk-off home run in the bottom of the ninth inning of Game 3. The Black Barons, however, were overpowered by the Homestead Grays, who won the Negro World Series in five games. In the Black Barons' only victory of the series, Zapp knocked a game-tying home run in the bottom of the ninth on the way to an extra-innings victory.

During the next two seasons, he played with semi-professional organizations, the Morocco Stars in 1949 and the Nashville Stars in 1950. He returned to the Elite Giants for the 1950 and 1951 seasons. As the mid-season of 1951 approached and the Negro league all-stars were selected, Zapp was left off the list, even though he was arguably playing the best baseball of his career thus far. Disgruntled, Zapp departed the team. A recommendation by fellow former Negro leaguer Butch McCord in 1952 persuaded club owner Josh Gibbons to sign Zapp to the Paris Lakers of the Mississippi-Ohio Valley League. Zapp hit .330 with 20 home runs, the league's most of the season, (low-power environment) and 136 RBIs for a league record which still stands today. He attributed his high RBI total to teammate McCords, who batted in front of Zapp with a lofty .390 batting average.

The following season Zapp joined the Danville Dans, briefly playing in just 11 games with a .286 average. He enjoyed two productive years with the Big Spring Broncs in 1954 and 1955, batting .290 with 32 home runs in 90 games and .311 with 29 home runs in 89 games. With the 32 home runs, the last of which was earned after suffering an eye injury, Zapp lead the league. In between seasons, Zapp returned to the Barons and then the Elite Giants for a month just as the Negro leagues were beginning to fold. For his second season with the Broncs, Zapp struggled defensively after being shifted to first base and was traded to the Port Arthur Sea Hawks, adding eight home runs and 37 RBIs during his stint. After the conclusion of the 1955 season, Zapp retired from baseball to work as a civil service worker for 24 years. In the early to mid 1970s he was the athletic director at Webb Air Force Base in Big Springs, Texas.

== Later life ==
Afflicted with Alzheimer's disease since the late-2000s, Zapp had been in declining health. In January 2016, his family made a public statement notifying fans he was in the final stages of the disease and could no longer respond to fan mail. He still was actively umpiring high school baseball games and lived in Harkers Heights, Texas. He died on September 30, 2016.
