= Jack Ridley (baseball) =

American baseball player

- Outfielder
- Born: 1905; Tennessee, U.S.
- Batted: Left

Negro league baseball debut
- 1928, for the Nashville Elite Giants

Last appearance
- 1933, for the Nashville Elite Giants

Teams
- Nashville Elite Giants (1928–1930); Cleveland Cubs (1931); Nashville Elite Giants (1932–1933)

Jack Ridley (1905 – death unknown) was an American Negro league outfielder in the 1920s and 1930s.

A native of Tennessee, Ridley made his Negro leagues debut in 1928 for the Nashville Elite Giants. He played for Nashville two more seasons before moving on to the Cleveland Cubs in 1931, then returning to Nashville to finish his career in 1932 and 1933.
