= Judge Owens (disambiguation) =

Judge Owens (1916–2001) was an American Negro league infielder. Judge Owens may also refer to:

- John B. Owens (born 1971), judge of the United States Court of Appeals for the Ninth Circuit
- Richard Owen (judge) (1922–2015), judge of the United States District Court for the Southern District of New York
- Wilbur Dawson Owens Jr. (1930–2010), judge of the United States District Court for the Middle District of Georgia
