= Frog Holsey =

American baseball player

- Pitcher
- Born: Robert J. Holsey; May 14, 1906; Louisiana, U.S.
- Died: December 12, 1972 (aged 66); Chicago, Illinois, U.S.

Negro league baseball debut
- 1928, for the Chicago American Giants

Last appearance
- 1932, for the Nashville Elite Giants
- Stats at Baseball Reference

Teams
- Chicago American Giants (1928–1930); Cleveland Cubs (1931); Nashville Elite Giants (1932)

Robert J. "Frog" Holsey (May 14, 1906 – December 12, 1972) was an American Negro league pitcher between 1928 and 1932.

A native of Louisiana, Holsey made his Negro leagues debut in 1928 with the Chicago American Giants. He played three seasons with Chicago, and went on to play for the Cleveland Cubs and Nashville Elite Giants.
