= Black Bottom Buford =

American baseball player (1906–1966)

- Second baseman
- Born: December 25, 1906; Spring Hill, Tennessee, US
- Died: November 8, 1966 (aged 59); Nashville, Tennessee, US
- Threw: Right

Negro league baseball debut
- 1929, for the Nashville Elite Giants

Last appearance
- 1933, for the Indianapolis ABCs
- Stats at Baseball Reference

Teams
- Nashville Elite Giants (1929–1930); Cleveland Cubs (1931); Nashville Elite Giants (1932); Indianapolis ABCs (1933)

James L. Buford Jr. (December 25, 1906 – November 8, 1966), nicknamed "Black Bottom", was an American Negro league second baseman between 1929 and 1933.

A native of Tennessee, Buford made his Negro leagues debut in 1929 with the Nashville Elite Giants. He remained with the club for four seasons, as it moved to Cleveland in 1931 and back to Nashville in 1932. Buford finished his career in 1933 with the Indianapolis ABCs.
