= Richard Cannon (baseball) =

American baseball player

- Pitcher
- Born: September 1909; Mount Vernon, Indiana, U.S.
- Died: February 3, 1935; Louisville, Kentucky, U.S.
- Threw: Right

Negro league baseball debut
- 1928, for the St. Louis Stars

Last appearance
- 1932, for the Birmingham Black Barons
- Stats at Baseball Reference

Teams
- St. Louis Stars (1928–1929); Louisville Black Caps (1930); Cleveland Cubs (1931); Nashville Elite Giants (1932); Louisville Black Caps (1932); Birmingham Black Barons (1932)

Richard Cannon (September 1909 – February 3, 1935), nicknamed "Speedball", was an American Negro league baseball pitcher from 1928 to 1932.

A native of Mount Vernon, Indiana, Cannon made his Negro leagues debut in 1928 with the St. Louis Stars. He played for St. Louis again the following season, then spent 1930 and 1931 with the Louisville Black Caps and Cleveland Cubs. Cannon died in Louisville, Kentucky, in 1935 at age 25 after being shot in an altercation with a 51-year-old man named William Raynes.
