= Zollie Wright =

American baseball player

- Outfielder
- Born: September 17, 1909; Milford, Texas, U.S.
- Died: April 12, 1976 (aged 66); Philadelphia, Pennsylvania, U.S.
- Batted: Right Threw: Right

Negro league baseball debut
- 1931, for the Memphis Red Sox

Last appearance
- 1943, for the New York Black Yankees

Teams
- Memphis Red Sox (1931); Monroe Monarchs (1932); New Orleans Crescent Stars (1934); Columbus Elite Giants (1935); Washington Elite Giants (1936–1937); Washington Black Senators (1938); New York Black Yankees (1938–1940); Philadelphia Stars (1941); New York Black Yankees (1943)

Zollie Coffer Wright (September 17, 1909 – April 12, 1976) was an American Negro league outfielder in the 1930s and 1940s.

A native of Milford, Texas, Wright attended Paul Quinn College. He made his Negro leagues debut in 1931 for the Memphis Red Sox. As a member of the Washington Elite Giants in 1936, Wright was selected to play in the East–West All-Star Game. He died in Philadelphia, Pennsylvania in 1976 at age 66.
