= Gayraud Wilmore =

American historian (1921–2020)

Gayraud Stephen Wilmore Jr. (December 20, 1921 – April 18, 2020) was an American writer, historian, ethicist, educator, and theologian, known for his role in the Civil Rights Movement and his scholarship related to the history of the African-American church and the history of African-American religious experience, as well as his contributions to black theology.

== Early life and army service ==
Wilmore was born in Philadelphia, Pennsylvania, to a mother who was a domestic worker and a father who was an office clerk. His father, a World War I veteran, founded the first Black American Legion Post in the state of Pennsylvania. Wilmore had two younger brothers—Alfred Wilmore, a pitcher in Negro league baseball; and Jacques Wilmore, a civil rights worker and activist.

In high school, Wilmore was active in drama club, wrote for the school newspaper, and briefly joined the Young Communist League before graduating in 1938.

After high school, he enrolled at Lincoln University, but was soon drafted into the United States Army. As a Buffalo Soldier, he served with the all-black 92nd Infantry division in Italy.

After returning to the United States, he completed his studies at Lincoln University, receiving his Bachelor of Arts degree in 1947.

== Ministry and academic career ==
Wilmore completed a Bachelor of Divinity degree in 1950, also at Lincoln University. Soon after graduation he was ordained by the Presbyterian Church (U.S.A.) and appointed pastor of the Second Presbyterian Church in West Chester, Pennsylvania. He would serve that congregation for three years. During his time in West Chester he helped integrate the local school system, with one of his sons becoming the first black student to attend an all-white school.

He began his first serious work related to civil rights when he was appointed to the PCUSA's Board of Christian Education's Department of Social Education and Action. He became an associate executive on the board, holding the position for five years. Wilmore then became a member of the faculty of Pittsburgh Theological Seminary, where he worked from 1959 to 1963 as assistant professor of social ethics. In 1963, when the 175th General Assembly of the UPCUSA convened, it created the Commission on Religion and Race, naming Wilmore as its executive director. During his time as executive director, Wilmore oversaw several racial justice initiatives, organized protests, and trained ministers to participate in boycotts. He served as executive director from 1962 until 1972.

Upon his retirement from the commission, he joined the faculty at Boston University School of Theology, teaching social ethics there from 1972 until 1974. He then taught at Colgate Rochester Divinity School from 1974 until 1983, before joining New York Theological Seminary, where he served as dean of divinity until 1987. He moved again to teach church history at the Interdenominational Theological Center in Atlanta, Georgia, where he also became editor of the school's theology journal. He remained at the school for five years before joining the faculty of United Theological Seminary in Dayton, Ohio, as an adjunct professor from 1995 until 1998.

He died on April 18, 2020, at the age of 98.

== Publications ==
Wilmore wrote or edited 16 books and is considered an internationally acclaimed scholar and theologian of the history of the African-American church and black theology. He was a contributing editor to Christianity and Crisis.

Among his more popular books are Black Theology: A Documentary History, 1966–1979 (edited with James Hal Cone and published in 1979); Black Religion and Black Radicalism: An Interpretation of the Religious History of African Americans, the first edition of which was published in 1973; and Pragmatic Spirituality, published in 2004.
