= Albert Owens =

American baseball player

- Pitcher

Negro league baseball debut
- 1930, for the Nashville Elite Giants

Last appearance
- 1930, for the Nashville Elite Giants
- Stats at Baseball Reference

Teams
- Nashville Elite Giants (1930)

Albert Owens was an American Negro league pitcher in the 1930s.

Owens played for the Nashville Elite Giants in 1930. In three recorded appearances on the mound, he posted a 6.61 ERA over 16.1 innings.
