= Jim Gray (third baseman) =

American baseball player

- Third baseman
- Born: May 28, 1907; Nashville, Tennessee
- Died: April 3, 1976 (aged 68); Nashville, Tennessee

Negro league baseball debut
- 1929, for the Nashville Elite Giants

Last appearance
- 1929, for the Nashville Elite Giants
- Stats at Baseball Reference

Teams
- Nashville Elite Giants (1929)

Ostranda "Jim" Gray (May 28, 1907 – April 3, 1976) was an American Negro league third baseman in the 1920s.

Gray played third base and occasionally second base for the Nashville Elite Giants in 1929. In three recorded games, he posted one hit in eight plate appearances.

Gray served as a private first class in the United States Army during World War II. He is buried at Nashville National Cemetery.
