= Pee Wee Butts =

American baseball player

- Shortstop
- Born: August 27, 1919; Sparta, Georgia
- Died: December 30, 1972 (aged 53); Atlanta, Georgia
- Batted: Right Threw: Right

Negro league baseball debut
- 1938, for the Atlanta Black Crackers

Last appearance
- 1954, for the Memphis Red Sox
- Stats at Baseball Reference

Teams
- Atlanta Black Crackers (1938); Indianapolis ABC's (1939); Baltimore Elite Giants (1939–42, 1944–51); Birmingham Black Barons (1952–53); Memphis Red Sox (1954)

Thomas Lee "Pee Wee" Butts (August 27, 1919 – December 30, 1972) was an American baseball player who played in the Negro leagues.

== Early life ==
Thomas Lee "Pee Wee" Butts was born August 27, 1919, in Sparta, Georgia, the birthplace of boxer Tommy "Hurricane" Jackson. He spent his childhood there and attended Washington High School. He played football and baseball for Washington High and was considered one of the best quarterbacks in the area. The name "Pee Wee" came from his stature. At 5'7" and 140 pounds after a big meal, Butts was one of the smallest players on record.

== The beginning ==
At age 17, Butts quit high school and began playing baseball with the Atlanta Black Crackers of the Negro American League in 1936. Because of his youth, opposing players tried to intimidate Butts by sliding spikes up into him. Here he also learned to throw side arm to get batters out at first. The team moved to Indianapolis after Pee Wee's first two seasons and became known as the ABCs. In 1940, the Baltimore Elite Giants of the Negro National League came to town to play the ABCs and offered Pee Wee a tryout after the game. Pee Wee was hesitant to leave home, but he figured the Black Crackers/ABCs team was breaking up, so he might as well.

== The Baltimore Elite Giants ==
For nine seasons in Baltimore, Pee Wee was a .280 hitter and he developed a reputation as one of the finest fielders in the game. He only hit 3 home runs in nine seasons but made up for it in average and fielding ability. He often turned double plays with the help of Junior Gilliam. It is said that Pee Wee coached Gilliam into the fine fielder that he became. Pee Wee had a problem with nerves at first. He was so nervous in his first game in Baltimore that he threw 3 balls into the stands. His manager, Felton Snow gave him the nickname "Cool breeze" to help him feel comfortable. In 1949, Baltimore won the pennant and the team fell apart financially. Gilliam went to Springfield, Massachusetts to try out for the Minor Leagues and Pee Wee knew he also would be moving on.

== Puerto Rico ==
For several seasons, Butts played in the off season in Puerto Rico in the late 1940s and early 1950s, after the Negro league season had commenced. In 1948, Butts hit .324 with the Santurce Crabbers.

== End of career ==
When Gilliam left for the Dodgers, rather than have to start over with a new second baseman, Butts went to Canada to play for the Winnipeg Buffaloes of the Manitoba-Dakota League. Under manager Willie Wells, Butts batted .286 and the team won the pennant. Wells helped Pee Wee to tame his erratic arm by telling him to remain low after fielding so he would not have to rush his throws. One season in Canada was enough for Butts. He said it was too cold in Winnipeg and he went to Lincoln, Nebraska, to play for the Class-A affiliate of the Philadelphia A's. Lincoln was none too kind to Pee Wee as he batted only .170 for the one season he was there. The organization wanted to send him to play for their Class B team, but Butts did not want to hold a roster spot from a young player who had a chance of moving up. He went back to the Negro leagues for two seasons before playing his final season in 1955 with the Texas City Texans of the Big State league.

== Almost to the Big Leagues ==
Two teammates of Butts', Jim Gilliam and Roy Campanella, made it to the major leagues. Gilliam was not as good a player as Butts was, but he was younger. Butts' coaches thought he would make it big;; people compared him to Phil Rizzuto. One Cuban pitcher who faced Butts when he played in Puerto Rico, Dolf Luque, even said that Butts could hit better than Rizzuto.

== Retirement ==
After Pee Wee's final season in Texas, he said he just moped around for a year. He returned home to Atlanta and played in an old timer's game in 1969. He went to visit Roy Campanella after his career ending car accident.
