= Clyde Sowell =

American baseball player

- Pitcher
- Born: December 22, 1931; Andalusia, Alabama, U.S.
- Died: July 22, 1989 (aged 57); Brundidge, Alabama, U.S.
- Batted: Right Threw: Right

Negro league baseball debut
- 1948, for the Baltimore Elite Giants

Last appearance
- 1948, for the Baltimore Elite Giants

Teams
- Baltimore Elite Giants (1948)

Clyde Eugene Sowell (December 22, 1931 – July 22, 1989) was an American Negro league pitcher in the 1940s.

A native of Andalusia, Alabama, Sowell played for the Baltimore Elite Giants in 1948. He died in Brundidge, Alabama in 1989 at age 57.
