= Gene Richardson =

American baseball player (1928–1997)

- Pitcher
- Born: January 26, 1928; San Diego, California, U.S.
- Died: August 1, 1997 (aged 69); San Diego, California, U.S.
- Batted: Left Threw: Left

Negro league baseball debut
- 1947, for the Kansas City Monarchs

Last appearance
- 1953, for the Kansas City Monarchs

Teams
- Kansas City Monarchs (1947–1950); Baltimore Elite Giants (1951); Kansas City Monarchs (1952–1953)

Career highlights and awards
- Negro American League ERA leader (1947)

Norval Eugene Richardson (January 26, 1928 – August 1, 1997) was an American professional baseball pitcher in the Negro leagues in the 1940s and 1950s.

A native of San Diego, California, Richardson attended San Diego High School, and made his Negro leagues debut in 1947 for the Kansas City Monarchs. A lefty with a good curve and control, he pitched for the Monarchs through 1950, then pitched one season for the Baltimore Elite Giants before finishing his career back in Kansas City for two final seasons. He died in San Diego in 1997 at age 69.
