= Clarence Trealkill =

American baseball player

- Shortstop
- Batted: Right Threw: Right

Negro league baseball debut
- 1929, for the Nashville Elite Giants

Last appearance
- 1929, for the Nashville Elite Giants

Teams
- Nashville Elite Giants (1929)

Clarence Harvey Trealkill was an American Negro league shortstop in the 1920s.

Trealkill played for the Nashville Elite Giants in 1929. In eight recorded games, he posted seven hits in 25 plate appearances.
