= Nate Moreland =

American baseball player (1914–1973)

- Pitcher
- Born: April 22, 1914; England, Arkansas, U.S.
- Died: November 27, 1973 (aged 59); Alameda County, California, U.S.
- Batted: Right Threw: Left

Negro league baseball debut
- 1940, for the Baltimore Elite Giants

Last Mexican League appearance
- 1946, for the Industriales de Monterrey

Teams
- Baltimore Elite Giants (1940, 1945); Alijadores de Tampico (1941, 1944); Industriales de Monterrey (1946)

Nathaniel Edmund Moreland (April 22, 1914 – November 27, 1973) was an American professional baseball pitcher in the Negro leagues, Mexican League and Minor League Baseball. He played professionally from 1940 to 1956 with several clubs.
