= Donald Troy =

American baseball player (1927–2006)

- Pitcher
- Born: March 2, 1927; Los Angeles, California, U.S.
- Died: July 31, 2006 (aged 79); Hilo, Hawaii, U.S.
- Batted: Right Threw: Right

Negro league baseball debut
- 1944, for the Baltimore Elite Giants

Last appearance
- 1945, for the Baltimore Elite Giants

Teams
- Baltimore Elite Giants (1944–1945)

Career highlights and awards
- Negro National League ERA leader (1944)

Donald Lee Troy (March 2, 1927 – July 31, 2006), nicknamed "California Kid", was an American professional baseball pitcher in the Negro leagues for the Baltimore Elite Giants in 1944 and 1945.

A native of Los Angeles, California, Troy broke into the Elite Giants' starting rotation in 1947 as a 17-year-old. He died in Hilo, Hawaii in 2006 at age 79.
