= Emery Adams =

American baseball player

- Pitcher
- Born: October 10, 1911; Collierville, Tennessee, U.S.
- Died: January 22, 1955 (aged 43); New York City, New York, U.S.
- Batted: Right Threw: Right

Negro league baseball debut
- 1932, for the Memphis Red Sox

Last appearance
- 1946, for the New York Black Yankees

Career statistics
- Win–loss record: 29–24
- Earned run average: 4.60
- Strikeouts: 184
- Stats at Baseball Reference

Teams
- Memphis Red Sox (1932, 1937–1938); Baltimore Elite Giants (1939–1942); New York Black Yankees (1943); Philadelphia Stars (1943); New York Black Yankees (1945–1946)

Emery "Ace" Adams (October 10, 1911 – January 22, 1955) was an American professional baseball pitcher in the Negro leagues. He played from 1932 to 1946 with the Memphis Red Sox, New York Black Yankees, and Baltimore Elite Giants.
