= Arnold Waites =

American baseball player

- Pitcher
- Born: October 20, 1914 (age 111); Bastrop County, Texas, U.S.
- Died: August 24, 1963 (aged 48); Nashville, Tennessee, U.S.
- Threw: Right

Negro league baseball debut
- 1935, for the Philadelphia Stars

Last appearance
- 1937, for the Washington Elite Giants

Teams
- Philadelphia Stars (1935); Homestead Grays (1936–1937); Washington Elite Giants (1937)

Arnold Waites (October 20, 1914 – August 24, 1963) was an American Negro league baseball pitcher who played in the 1930s.

A native of Bastrop County, Texas, Waites made his Negro leagues debut in 1935 with the Philadelphia Stars. He went on to play for the Homestead Grays the following season, and finished his career in 1937 with the Grays and the Washington Elite Giants. Waites died in Nashville, Tennessee in 1963 at age 48.
