= Toots Ferrell =

American baseball player

- Pitcher
- Born: September 21, 1929; Chestertown, Maryland, US
- Died: October 11, 2002 (aged 73); Newark, Delaware, US

Negro league baseball debut
- 1947, for the Newark Eagles

Last appearance
- 1949, for the Baltimore Elite Giants
- Stats at Baseball Reference

Teams
- Newark Eagles (1947); Baltimore Elite Giants (1948–1949)

Howard Leroy Ferrell Jr. (September 21, 1929 – October 11, 2002), nicknamed "Toots", was an American Negro league pitcher in the 1940s.

A native of Chestertown, Maryland, Ferrell made his Negro leagues debut at age 17 with the Newark Eagles in 1947. He went on to play for the Baltimore Elite Giants in 1948 and 1949, and served in the US Army during the Korean War. Ferrell was inducted into the Delaware Sports Museum and Hall of Fame in 2000, and died in Newark, Delaware in 2002 at age 73.
