= Art Demery =

American baseball player

- Outfielder
- Born: June 10, 1914; Boley, Oklahoma, U.S.
- Died: January 5, 1995 (aged 80); Bakersfield, California, U.S.

Negro league baseball debut
- 1941, for the Baltimore Elite Giants

Last appearance
- 1941, for the Baltimore Elite Giants

Teams
- Baltimore Elite Giants (1941)

Artist Demery (June 10, 1914 – January 5, 1995) was an American Negro league outfielder in the 1940s.

A native of Boley, Oklahoma, Demery played for the Baltimore Elite Giants in 1941. He was the father of professional baseball players Larry Demery, who played for the Pittsburgh Pirates, and Art Demery Jr, who played in the Kansas City Royals' minor league system. Demery died in Bakersfield, California in 1995 at age 80.
