= Jamuel Tarrant =

American baseball player

- Pitcher
- Born: November 25, 1914; Piedmont, South Carolina, U.S.
- Died: September 7, 2012 (aged 97); Stockbridge, Georgia, U.S.

Negro league baseball debut
- 1945, for the Baltimore Elite Giants

Last appearance
- 1945, for the Baltimore Elite Giants

Teams
- Baltimore Elite Giants (1945)

Jamuel Tarrant (November 25, 1914 – September 7, 2012) was an American Negro league pitcher in the 1940s.

A native of Piedmont, South Carolina, Tarrant pitched for the Baltimore Elite Giants in 1945. He died in Stockbridge, Georgia in 2012 at age 97.
