= Bill Anderson (outfielder) =

- Right fielder
- Born: 1907; Enterprise, Alabama, U.S.
- Died: March 21, 1932 (aged 24–25); Northport, Alabama, U.S.
- Batted: Unknown Threw: Unknown

Negro league baseball debut
- 1930, for the Nashville Elite Giants

Last appearance
- 1930, for the Nashville Elite Giants
- Stats at Baseball Reference

Teams
- Nashville Elite Giants (1930)

William M. Anderson (1907 – March 21, 1932) was an American professional baseball right fielder in the Negro leagues. He played with the Nashville Elite Giants in 1930.
