= Manuel Stewart =

American baseball player

- Third baseman
- Born: July 30, 1922; Chester, South Carolina, U.S.
- Died: May 27, 1954 (aged 31); Elizabeth, New Jersey, U.S.

NNL debut
- 1946, for the Baltimore Elite Giants

Last NNL appearance
- 1946, for the Baltimore Elite Giants

NNL statistics
- Batting average: .000
- Home runs: 0
- Runs batted in: 0

Teams
- Baltimore Elite Giants (1946)

Manuel Stewart (July 30, 1922 – May 27, 1954) was an American Negro league third baseman in the 1940s.

A native of Chester, South Carolina, Stewart played for the Baltimore Elite Giants in 1946. He died in Elizabeth, New Jersey in 1954 at age 31.

Stewart, who served in the United States Marine Corps during World War II, was serving as a patrolman in New Jersey for three years when he killed his girlfriend, Gladys Foreman, and then himself with his service revolver.
