= Ted Brown (baseball) =

American baseball player

- Shortstop

Negro league baseball debut
- 1943, for the Baltimore Elite Giants

Last appearance
- 1943, for the Baltimore Elite Giants

Teams
- Baltimore Elite Giants (1943)

Ted Brown is an American former Negro league shortstop who played in the 1940s.

Brown played for the Baltimore Elite Giants in 1943. In five recorded games, he posted six hits in 19 plate appearances.
