= Johnny Hayes (baseball) =

American baseball player (1910-1988)

- Catcher
- Born: April 27, 1910; Independence, Missouri, U.S.
- Died: November 16, 1988 (aged 78); Auburn Park, Illinois, U.S.
- Batted: Left Threw: Right

Negro league baseball debut
- 1934, for the Newark Dodgers

Last appearance
- 1951, for the Baltimore Elite Giants
- Stats at Baseball Reference

Teams
- Newark Dodgers (1934–1934); Newark Eagles (1936–1939); New York Black Yankees (1940–1942, 1946–1948); Baltimore Elite Giants (1949–1951)

John William Hayes (April 27, 1910 – November 16, 1988) was an American Negro league baseball catcher from 1934 to 1951.

A native of Independence, Missouri, Hayes served in the US Army during World War II. He was selected to play in the East–West All-Star Game in 1947 and 1951. Hayes died in Auburn Park, Illinois in 1988 at age 78.
