= Graham Pace =

American baseball player

- Outfielder

Negro league baseball debut
- 1930, for the Nashville Elite Giants

Last appearance
- 1930, for the Nashville Elite Giants

Teams
- Nashville Elite Giants (1930)

Graham Pace, nicknamed "Eddie", is an American former Negro league outfielder who played in the 1930s.

Pace played for the Nashville Elite Giants in 1930. In eight recorded games, he posted five hits in 31 plate appearances.
