= Ziggy Marcell =

American baseball player (1916-1990)

- Catcher
- Born: September 1, 1916; New Orleans, Louisiana, U.S.
- Died: October 10, 1990 (aged 74); Los Angeles, California, U.S.
- Batted: Right Threw: Right

Negro league baseball debut
- 1939, for the Kansas City Monarchs

Last appearance
- 1948, for the Newark Eagles

Teams
- Kansas City Monarchs (1939); Homestead Grays (1940); New York Black Yankees (1941); Chicago American Giants (1942); Philadelphia Stars (1942); Baltimore Elite Giants (1947); Newark Eagles (1948)

Everett Marcell (September 1, 1916 – October 10, 1990), nicknamed "Ziggy", was an American Negro league baseball catcher and Harlem Globetrotters basketball player in the 1930s and 1940s.

A native of New Orleans, Louisiana, Marcell attended Southern University, and was the son of fellow Negro leaguer Oliver Marcell. A basketball star at Southern, Marcell was known for his extraordinary ball-handling skills. He continued his basketball career after college, suiting up for the Harlem Globetrotters from 1938 to 1946, and for the Los Angeles Red Devils basketball team alongside Baseball Hall of Famer Jackie Robinson in 1946. Marcell also played professional football in 1944 for the Los Angeles Bulldogs.

Marcell made his Negro leagues debut in 1939 for the Kansas City Monarchs, and played for several teams before concluding his Negro leagues career with the Newark Eagles in 1948. In 1950, he played for the Farnham Pirates of the Provincial League.

Marcell died in Los Angeles, California in 1990 at age 74.
