= William Makell =

American baseball player

- Catcher
- Born: June 22, 1922; Washington, D.C., U.S.
- Died: May 1967 (aged 44); Unknown
- Batted: Right Threw: Right

Negro league baseball debut
- 1943, for the Baltimore Elite Giants

Last appearance
- 1944, for the Newark Eagles

Teams
- Baltimore Elite Giants (1943); Newark Eagles (1944)

William M. Makell (June 22, 1922 – May 1967), also listed as Frank Makell, was an American professional baseball catcher in the Negro leagues. He played with the Baltimore Elite Giants in 1943 and the Newark Eagles in 1944.
