= Frank Stewart (1930s pitcher) =

American baseball player

- Pitcher

Negro league baseball debut
- 1934, for the Homestead Grays

Last appearance
- 1936, for the Washington Elite Giants

Teams
- Homestead Grays (1934); Washington Elite Giants (1936)

Frank Stewart (fl. 1936) is an American former Negro league pitcher who played in the 1930s.

Stewart made his Negro leagues debut in 1934 with the Homestead Grays. He went on to play for the Washington Elite Giants in 1936.
