= Al Johnson (pitcher) =

American baseball player

- Pitcher

Negro league baseball debut
- 1936, for the Washington Elite Giants

Last appearance
- 1936, for the Washington Elite Giants

Teams
- Washington Elite Giants (1936)

Al Johnson is an American former Negro league pitcher who played in the 1930s.

Johnson played for the Washington Elite Giants in 1936. In four recorded appearances on the mound, he posted a 10.80 ERA over 13.1 innings.
