= Charlie Humber =

American baseball player

- Second baseman
- Born: February 14, 1914; Richland, Georgia, U.S.
- Died: June 27, 1991 (aged 77); Joppa, Maryland, U.S.
- Batted: Right Threw: Right

Negro league baseball debut
- 1943, for the Baltimore Elite Giants

Last appearance
- 1945, for the Newark Eagles

Teams
- Baltimore Elite Giants (1943); Newark Eagles (1945)

Charlie W. Humber (February 14, 1914 – June 27, 1991) was an American professional baseball second baseman in the Negro leagues. He played with the Baltimore Elite Giants in 1943 and the Newark Eagles in 1945.

Some sources combine his career with Thomas Humber, who played Minor League Baseball from 1955 to 1961, but this was a different player.
