= Tony Walker (pitcher) =

American baseball player

- Pitcher

Negro league baseball debut
- 1944, for the Baltimore Elite Giants

Last appearance
- 1945, for the Philadelphia Stars

Teams
- Baltimore Elite Giants (1944–1945); Philadelphia Stars (1945)

Tony Walker, nicknamed "Pretty Boy", was an American Negro league pitcher in the 1940s.

Walker made his Negro leagues debut in 1944 with the Baltimore Elite Giants. The following season, he returned to Baltimore and also played for the Philadelphia Stars.
