= Roosevelt Tate =

American baseball player

- Outfielder
- Born: March 10, 1911; Bessemer, Alabama, U.S.
- Died: December 25, 1968 (aged 57); Bessemer, Alabama, U.S.
- Batted: Right Threw: Right

Negro league baseball debut
- 1931, for the Knoxville Giants

Last appearance
- 1937, for the Chicago American Giants

Teams
- Knoxville Giants (1931); Birmingham Black Barons (1932); Nashville Elite Giants (1932); Louisville Black Caps (1932); Cincinnati Tigers (1937); Chicago American Giants (1937)

Roosevelt Tate (March 10, 1911 – December 25, 1968), nicknamed "Speed" and "Bill", was an American Negro league outfielder in the 1930s.

A native of Bessemer, Alabama, Tate made his Negro leagues debut in 1931 for the Knoxville Giants. The following season, he split time between the Birmingham Black Barons, Nashville Elite Giants, and Louisville Black Caps. Tate's final professional season came in 1937, when he played for the Cincinnati Tigers and Chicago American Giants. He died in Bessemer in 1968 at age 57.
