= José Pereira (baseball) =

Puerto Rican baseball player (born 1927)

- Pitcher
- Born: June 8, 1927; Fajardo, Puerto Rico
- Died: May 20, 2001 (aged 73); Toa Alta, Puerto Rico
- Batted: Right Threw: Right

Negro league baseball debut
- 1947, for the Baltimore Elite Giants

Last appearance
- 1947, for the Baltimore Elite Giants

Teams
- Baltimore Elite Giants (1947)

José Pereira (June 8, 1927 – May 20, 2001) was a Puerto Rican pitcher in the Negro leagues.

A native of Fajardo, Puerto Rico, Pereira played for the Baltimore Elite Giants in 1947. He died in Toa Alta, Puerto Rico in 2001 at age 73.
