= Clarence Lewis (baseball) =

American baseball player (1911–1937)

- Shortstop
- Born: 1911; Memphis, Tennessee, U.S.
- Died: July 28, 1937 (aged 25–26); Memphis, Tennessee, U.S.
- Batted: Right Threw: Right

Negro league baseball debut
- 1932, for the Memphis Red Sox

Last appearance
- 1937, for the Memphis Red Sox

Teams
- Memphis Red Sox (1932, 1937); Pittsburgh Crawfords (1933); Akron Grays (1933); Cleveland Giants (1933); Homestead Grays (1933); Cleveland Red Sox (1934); Nashville Elite Giants (1934)

Clarence E. “Foots” Lewis Jr. (1911 – July 28, 1937) was an American professional baseball shortstop in the Negro leagues. He played with the Memphis Red Sox in 1932 and 1937, four teams in 1933, and the Cleveland Red Sox and Nashville Elite Giants in 1934.
