= Jimmy Direaux =

American baseball player

- Pitcher
- Born: 1916 (age 109–110); Pasadena, California, U.S.
- Batted: Right Threw: Right

Negro league baseball debut
- 1937, for the Washington Elite Giants

Last appearance
- 1938, for the Baltimore Elite Giants
- Stats at Baseball Reference

Teams
- Washington Elite Giants (1937); Baltimore Elite Giants (1938)

James Direaux (born 1916) is an American former Negro league pitcher who played in the 1930s.

A native of Pasadena, Direaux made his Negro leagues debut in 1937 with the Washington Elite Giants. He played for the Elite Giants again the following season when the team moved to Baltimore. After a season without a team, Direax moved to the Mexican League, where he played for Carta Blanca from 1939 to 1940 and later for the Alijadores de Tampico from the remainder of the 1940 until 1943. Spending a season with Azules de Veracruz, Direaux returned to Tampico for the 1944 season, before transferring once more to Diablos Rojos del México, where he retired after the 1945 season.
