= Ossie Stewart (baseball) =

American baseball player

- Pitcher

Negro league baseball debut
- 1943, for the Baltimore Elite Giants

Last appearance
- 1943, for the Baltimore Elite Giants

Teams
- Baltimore Elite Giants (1943)

Ossie Stewart is an American former Negro league pitcher who played in the 1940s.

Stewart played for the Baltimore Elite Giants in 1943. In four recorded appearances on the mound, he posted a 12.71 ERA over 11.1 innings.
