= Ed Finney =

American baseball player

- Third baseman
- Born: November 4, 1924; Akron, Ohio, U.S.
- Died: March 17, 1998 (aged 73); Akron, Ohio, U.S.
- Batted: Right Threw: Right

Negro league baseball debut
- 1947, for the Baltimore Elite Giants

Last appearance
- 1948, for the Baltimore Elite Giants
- Stats at Baseball Reference

Teams
- Baltimore Elite Giants (1947–1948)

Edward Louis Finney (November 4, 1924 – March 17, 1998), nicknamed "Mike", was an American Negro league third baseman in the 1940s.

A native of Akron, Ohio, Finney made his Negro leagues debut in 1947 for the Baltimore Elite Giants, and played for Baltimore again in 1948. He died in Akron in 1998 at age 73.
