= Red Parnell =

American baseball player (1903–1954)

- Outfielder / Pitcher / Player-manager
- Born: November 23, 1903; Port Allen, Louisiana, U.S.
- Died: February 22, 1954 (aged 48); Philadelphia, Pennsylvania, U.S.
- Batted: Right Threw: Right

Negro league baseball debut
- 1927, for the Birmingham Black Barons

Last appearance
- 1943, for the Philadelphia Stars

Career statistics
- Batting average: .328
- Hits: 719
- Home runs: 39
- Runs batted in: 374
- Stolen bases: 51
- Earned run average: 1.86
- Managerial record: 9–21
- Winning percentage: .300

Teams
- As player: Birmingham Black Barons (1927–1928); Monroe Monarchs (1932); Nashville Elite Giants (1934); Columbus Elite Giants (1935); Philadelphia Stars (1936–1943); As manager: Philadelphia Stars (1940–1941)

Career highlights and awards
- 2× NgL All-Star (1934, 1939); Negro Southern League ERA leader (1932); Negro National League batting champion (1927)

Roy Alexander "Red" Parnell (November 23, 1903 – February 22, 1954) was an American professional baseball outfielder, pitcher, and player-manager in Negro league baseball, most notably with the Philadelphia Stars from 1936 to 1943. Born in Port Allen, Louisiana, he died at age 48 in Philadelphia.

In his rookie year in the Negro National League in 1927, he batted .422 in 87 games, which was the best among the league batters (he also led the league in hits with 141). In 1932, playing with Memphis of the NSL, he led the league in doubles (12), triples (11), and runs batted in (50). Parnell also tried his hand at pitching, appearing in at least one game in four seasons. He had played in just four games at pitcher before 1932, but he was sent to pitch seven for the Red Sox that year (with six starts), and he responded with five complete games and two shutouts for a 5-1 record in 54 innings pitched. He had an ERA of 0.83, which led the Negro Southern League. He appeared in just one further game at pitcher in 1940 for Philadelphia, allowing three runs in seven innings in a loss. He played thirteen seasons on and off in the Negro leagues (1927–28, 1932, 1934-1943).

Teams he played with included:

- Birmingham Black Barons (1926-1928)
- Houston Black Buffaloes (1932)
- Monroe Monarchs (1932)
- New Orleans Crescent Stars (1933-1934)
- Nashville Elite Giants (1934)
- Columbus Elite Giants (1935)
- Philadelphia Stars (1936-1943)
- Santo Domingo (1937)
- New York Black Yankees (1937)
- Pittsburgh Crawfords (1946)
- Houston Eagles (1950)
