= Archie Hinton =

American baseball player

- Pitcher
- Born: June 1, 1926; Raleigh, North Carolina, U.S.
- Died: January 17, 1974 (aged 47); San Francisco, California, U.S.
- Batted: Right Threw: Right

Negro league baseball debut
- 1945, for the Baltimore Elite Giants

Last appearance
- 1946, for the Baltimore Elite Giants
- Stats at Baseball Reference

Teams
- Baltimore Elite Giants (1945–1946)

Roland Rudolph Hinton (June 1, 1926 – January 17, 1974), nicknamed "Archie", was an American Negro league pitcher in the 1940s.

A native of Raleigh, North Carolina, Hinton attended Santa Monica High School. He played for the Baltimore Elite Giants in 1945 and 1946, and died in San Francisco, California in 1974 at age 47.
