= Louis English =

American baseball player (1902–1976)

- Catcher
- Born: February 24, 1902; Louisville, Kentucky, U.S.
- Died: July 9, 1976 (aged 74); Butte County, California, U.S.

Negro league baseball debut
- 1929, for the Detroit Stars

Last appearance
- 1932, for the Louisville Black Caps

Career statistics
- Batting average: .247
- Home runs: 3
- Runs batted in: 20
- Stats at Baseball Reference

Teams
- Detroit Stars (1929); Nashville Elite Giants (1930); Louisville Black Caps (1930); Louisville White Sox (1931); Louisville Black Caps (1932)

Louis English (February 24, 1902 – July 9, 1976) was an American Negro league catcher from 1929 to 1932.

A native of Louisville, Kentucky, English made his Negro leagues debut in 1929 for the Detroit Stars. He went on to play for the Nashville Elite Giants, Louisville Black Caps, and Louisville White Sox.

In 1945, he managed a black baseball team consisting of players from the Chico Army Air Field.

English died in Butte County, California in 1976 at age 74.
