= Biggie Williams =

American baseball player

- Outfielder

Negro league baseball debut
- 1943, for the Baltimore Elite Giants

Last appearance
- 1943, for the Baltimore Elite Giants

Teams
- Baltimore Elite Giants (1943)

Bilbo Williams, nicknamed "Biggie", is an American former Negro league outfielder who played in the 1940s.

Williams played for the Baltimore Elite Giants in 1943. In six recorded games, he posted two hits in 23 plate appearances.
