= Butch Davis (outfielder, born 1916) =

American baseball player

- Left fielder
- Born: May 4, 1916; Charlotte, North Carolina, U.S.
- Died: November 28, 1988 (aged 72); Charlotte, North Carolina, U.S.
- Batted: Left Threw: Right

Negro league baseball debut
- 1944, for the Atlanta Black Crackers

Last appearance
- 1947, for the Baltimore Elite Giants
- Stats at Baseball Reference

Teams
- Atlanta Black Crackers (1944); Baltimore Elite Giants (1947, 1949)

Robert Lomax "Butch" Davis (May 4, 1916 – November 28, 1988) was an American professional baseball left fielder in the Negro leagues. He played for the Atlanta Black Crackers in 1944 and the Baltimore Elite Giants in 1947 and 1949. He also played in Minor League Baseball until 1955.
