= Leonardo Chapman =

Puerto Rican baseball player (born 1922

- First baseman
- Born: April 30, 1922; Puerta de Tierra, Puerto Rico
- Died: October 20, 1974 (aged 52); San Juan, Puerto Rico

Negro league baseball debut
- 1944, for the Baltimore Elite Giants

Last appearance
- 1944, for the Baltimore Elite Giants

Teams
- Baltimore Elite Giants (1944)

Leonardo Chapman Medina (April 30, 1922 – October 20, 1974) was a Puerto Rican first baseman in the Negro leagues in the 1940s.

A native of Puerta de Tierra, Puerto Rico, Chapman played for the Baltimore Elite Giants in 1944. In 11 recorded games, he posted seven hits in 42 plate appearances. Chapman died in San Juan, Puerto Rico in 1974 at age 52.
