= Joe Wiley =

American baseball player (1918–1993)

- Infielder
- Born: August 27, 1918; New Orleans, Louisiana, U.S.
- Died: March 13, 1993 (aged 74); New Orleans, Louisiana, U.S.
- Batted: Right Threw: Right

Negro league baseball debut
- 1947, for the Baltimore Elite Giants

Last appearance
- 1948, for the Birmingham Black Barons

Teams
- Baltimore Elite Giants (1947); Birmingham Black Barons (1948)

Joseph Wiley Jr. (August 27, 1918 – March 13, 1993) was an American Negro league infielder in the late 1940s.

A native of New Orleans, Louisiana, Wiley made his Negro leagues debut in 1947 for the Baltimore Elite Giants, and played for the Birmingham Black Barons the following season. In 1950 and 1951, he played in the Mandak League for the Elmwood Giants and the Carman Cardinals. Wiley died in New Orleans in 1993 at age 74.
