= Woodrow Wilson (baseball) =

American baseball player (1916–1965)

Woodrow "Lefty" Wilson
- Pitcher
- Born: December 16, 1916; Limestone County, Texas, U.S.
- Died: April 19, 1965 (aged 48); Dallas, Texas, U.S.
- Threw: Left

Negro league baseball debut
- 1936, for the Washington Elite Giants

Last appearance
- 1940, for the Indianapolis Crawfords

Teams
- Washington Elite Giants (1936); Kansas City Monarchs (1936–1937); Memphis Red Sox (1937–1940); Indianapolis Crawfords (1940)

Woodrow W. Wilson (December 16, 1916 – April 19, 1965), nicknamed "Lefty", was an American Negro league pitcher between 1936 and 1940.

A native of Limestone County, Texas, Wilson made his Negro leagues debut in 1936 for the Washington Elite Giants and Kansas City Monarchs. He went on to spend four seasons with the Memphis Red Sox. Wilson died in Dallas, Texas in 1965 at age 48.
