= Cowboy Murray =

Professional baseball player

- Pitcher
- Batted: Unknown Threw: Unknown

Negro league baseball debut
- 1943, for the Baltimore Elite Giants

Last appearance
- 1943, for the Baltimore Elite Giants

Teams
- Baltimore Elite Giants (1943)

Cowboy Murray was an American professional baseball pitcher in the Negro leagues. He played with the Baltimore Elite Giants in 1943.
