= Harvey Young (baseball) =

American baseball player

- Shortstop
- Born: October 20, 1920; Nashville, Tennessee, U.S.
- Died: August 1, 1959 (aged 38); Nashville, Tennessee, U.S.
- Threw: Right

Negro league baseball debut
- 1941, for the New York Black Yankees

Last appearance
- 1944, for the Kansas City Monarchs

Teams
- New York Black Yankees (1941); Baltimore Elite Giants (1943); Atlanta Black Crackers (1943); Kansas City Monarchs (1944)

Harvey Young (October 20, 1920 – August 1, 1959), nicknamed "Pep", was an American Negro league shortstop who played in the 1940s.

A native of Nashville, Young made his Negro leagues debut in 1941 with the New York Black Yankees. He went on to play for the Baltimore Elite Giants and Atlanta Black Crackers in 1943, and finished his career in 1944 with the Kansas City Monarchs.
