= Charley Davidson =

American baseball player

- Pitcher
- Born: September 2, 1916; Cheraw, South Carolina, U.S.
- Died: May 29, 1990 (aged 73)
- Batted: Unknown Threw: Right

Negro league baseball debut
- 1940, for the Baltimore Elite Giants

Last appearance
- 1948, for the New York Black Yankees
- Stats at Baseball Reference

Teams
- Baltimore Elite Giants (1940); New York Black Yankees (1946-1948)

Charles William "Specs" Davidson (September 27, 1916 – April 29, 1990) was an American professional baseball pitcher in the Negro leagues. He played with the Baltimore Elite Giants in 1940 and the New York Black Yankees from 1946 to 1948.
