= Bud Mitchell =

American baseball player

- Outfielder
- Threw: Right

Negro league baseball debut
- 1929, for the Hilldale Club

Last appearance
- 1935, for the Columbus Elite Giants
- Stats at Baseball Reference

Teams
- Hilldale Club (1929–1931); Bacharach Giants (1933); Philadelphia Stars (1933); Baltimore Black Sox (1934); Columbus Elite Giants (1935)

Bud Mitchell is an American former Negro league outfielder who played between 1929 and 1935.

Mitchell attended Chester High School and Lincoln University. He made his Negro leagues debut in 1929 with the Hilldale Club, and played three seasons with Hilldale. Mitchell went on to play for several teams, finishing his career in 1935 with the Columbus Elite Giants.
