= Luis Villodas =

Puerto Rican baseball player (1918-1994)

- Catcher
- Born: January 4, 1918; Ponce, Puerto Rico
- Died: August 21, 1994 (aged 76); Ponce, Puerto Rico
- Batted: Right Threw: Right

Negro league baseball debut
- 1946, for the Baltimore Elite Giants

Last appearance
- 1947, for the Baltimore Elite Giants

Teams
- Baltimore Elite Giants (1944–45)

Luis Villodas Ramírez (January 4, 1918 – August 21, 1994), nicknamed "King Kong", was a Puerto Rican catcher in the Negro leagues in 1946 and 1947.

A native of Ponce, Puerto Rico, Villodas made his Negro leagues debut in 1946 for the Baltimore Elite Giants, and played for Baltimore again in 1947. He went on to play in the minor leagues for the Albuquerque Dukes and Abilene Blue Sox through the 1955 season. Villodas was inducted into the Puerto Rican Baseball Hall of Fame in 1993, and died in Ponce in 1994 at age 76.
