= Johnny A. Johnson =

American baseball player (born 1915)

Johnny Johnson
- Pitcher
- Born: September 26, 1915; Jefferson, Texas, U.S.
- Threw: Right

Negro league baseball debut
- 1938, for the Newark Eagles

Last appearance
- 1946, for the New York Black Yankees
- Stats at Baseball Reference

Teams
- Newark Eagles (1938); Baltimore Elite Giants (1939); Homestead Grays (1944); New York Black Yankees (1945–1946)

John Arthur Johnson (born September 26, 1915, date of death unknown), nicknamed "Long John", was an American Negro league pitcher who played between 1938 and 1946.

A native of De Soto Parish, Louisiana, Johnson made his Negro leagues debut in 1938 with the Newark Eagles. He played for the Baltimore Elite Giants the following season, and went on to play for the Homestead Grays during their 1944 Negro World Series championship season. Johnson finished his career with a two-year stint with the New York Black Yankees in 1945 and 1946.
