= Jesse Brown (baseball) =

American baseball player

- Pitcher
- Born: June 6, 1914; Cleveland, Ohio, U.S.
- Died: May 25, 1980 (aged 65); Wellesley, Massachusetts, U.S.
- Batted: Left Threw: Left

Negro league baseball debut
- 1938, for the Newark Eagles

Last appearance
- 1944, for the New York Black Yankees
- Stats at Baseball Reference

Teams
- Newark Eagles (1938); New York Black Yankees (1939–1940); Baltimore Elite Giants (1940–1942); New York Black Yankees (1944)

Jesse James Brown (June 6, 1914 – May 25, 1980) was an American Negro league pitcher between 1938 and 1944.

A native of Cleveland, Ohio, Brown made his Negro leagues debut in 1938 with the Newark Eagles. He went on to play for the New York Black Yankees and Baltimore Elite Giants. Brown died in Wellesley, Massachusetts in 1980 at age 65.
