= Freddie Shepard =

American baseball player

- Outfielder
- Born: June 12, 1916; Wetumpka, Alabama, U.S.
- Died: December 5, 1999 (aged 83); Birmingham, Alabama, U.S.
- Batted: Left Threw: Right

Negro league baseball debut
- 1943, for the Baltimore Elite Giants

Last appearance
- 1946, for the Birmingham Black Barons

Teams
- Baltimore Elite Giants (1943); Atlanta Black Crackers (1943–1944); Birmingham Black Barons (1945–1946)

Frederick Douglas Shepard (June 12, 1916 – December 5, 1999) was an American Negro league outfielder in the 1940s.

A native of Wetumpka, Alabama, Shepard attended Morris Brown College. He made his Negro league debut in 1943 for the Baltimore Elite Giants, then played for the Atlanta Black Crackers through 1944, and the Birmingham Black Barons in 1945 and 1946. Shepard played minor league baseball in 1950 for the Minot Mallards of the Mandak League. He died in Birmingham, Alabama in 1999 at age 83.
