= Willie Bobo (baseball) =

American baseball player

- First baseman
- Born: 1898; Texas, U.S.
- Died: February 22, 1931; San Diego, California, U.S.
- Batted: Left Threw: Left

Negro league baseball debut
- 1923, for the Kansas City Monarchs

Last appearance
- 1930, for the Nashville Elite Giants
- Stats at Baseball Reference

Teams
- Kansas City Monarchs (1923); St. Louis Stars (1924–1928); Cleveland Tigers (1928); Nashville Elite Giants (1930)

Willie Alphonso Bobo (February 7, 1898 - February 22, 1931) was an American Negro league baseball first baseman between 1923 and 1930.

A native of Tennessee, Bobo made his Negro leagues debut in 1923 with the Kansas City Monarchs. He played the next five seasons with the St. Louis Stars, and finished his career with a two-year stint with the Nashville Elite Giants in 1929 and 1930. Bobo died in San Diego, California in 1931 at 33 years old
