= Tom Jackson (baseball) =

- Pitcher
- Batted: Unknown Threw: Right

Negro league baseball debut
- 1926, for the St. Louis Stars

Last appearance
- 1929, for the Nashville Elite Giants
- Stats at Baseball Reference

Teams
- St. Louis Stars (1926-1927); Memphis Red Sox (1927); Cleveland Tigers (1928); Nashville Elite Giants (1929)

Thomas Walton Jackson was an American professional baseball pitcher in the Negro leagues. He played with the St. Louis Stars in 1926 and 1927, the Memphis Red Sox in 1927, the Cleveland Tigers in 1928, and the Nashville Elite Giants in 1929.
