= Clyde Parris =

Panamanian baseball player (1922–2016)

- Third baseman / Shortstop / Second baseman
- Born: September 11, 1922; Panama City, Panama
- Died: July 9, 2016 (aged 93); Valley Stream, New York, U.S.
- Batted: Right Threw: Right

Negro league baseball debut
- 1946, for the Baltimore Elite Giants

Last appearance
- 1947, for the New York Black Yankees

Teams
- Baltimore Elite Giants (1946); New York Black Yankees (1946–1947)

Jonathan Clyde Parris (September 11, 1922 – July 9, 2016) was a Panamanian professional baseball third baseman, shortstop and second baseman in the Negro leagues in the 1940s.

A native of Panama City, Panama, Parris played for the Baltimore Elite Giants in 1946, and the New York Black Yankees in 1946 and 1947. Following his Negro leagues career, he played minor league baseball through 1960, including five years with the Montreal Royals of the International League. Parris died in Valley Stream, New York in 2016 at age 93.
