= Sam Thompson (pitcher) =

American baseball player

- Pitcher
- Born: May 27, 1908; Sulligent, Alabama, U.S.
- Died: January 29, 1978 (aged 69); Los Angeles, California, U.S.
- Batted: Right Threw: Right

Negro league baseball debut
- 1932, for the Indianapolis ABCs

Last appearance
- 1942, for the Chicago American Giants

Teams
- Indianapolis ABCs (1932); Pollock's Cuban Stars (1933); Kansas City Monarchs (1934); Columbus Elite Giants (1935); Philadelphia Stars (1936–1940); Chicago American Giants (1942)

Samuel Thompson (May 27, 1908 – January 29, 1978), nicknamed "Sad Sam", was an American pitcher in the Negro leagues from 1932 to 1942.

A native of Sulligent, Alabama, Thompson attended Sumner High School and Wiley College. He pitched for over a decade in the Negro leagues, and was often ranked among the league's top hurlers.

Thompson died in Los Angeles, California in 1978 at age 69.
