= Bill Harvey (baseball) =

American baseball player

- Pitcher
- Born: March 23, 1908; Clarksdale, Mississippi, U.S.
- Died: March 3, 1989 (aged 80); Baltimore, Maryland, U.S.
- Batted: Left Threw: Left

Negro league baseball debut
- 1931, for the Memphis Red Sox

Last appearance
- 1946, for the Baltimore Elite Giants
- Stats at Baseball Reference

Teams
- Memphis Red Sox (1931–1934); Monroe Monarchs (1932); Cleveland Giants (1933); Pittsburgh Crawfords (1933, 1935–1938); Toledo Crawfords (1939); Baltimore Elite Giants (1939, 1942–1946)

David William Harvey (March 23, 1908 – March 3, 1989) was an American Negro league baseball pitcher in the 1930s and 1940s.

A native of Clarksdale, Mississippi, Harvey made his Negro leagues debut with the Memphis Red Sox in 1931. He went on to play for several other teams, with his longest stints coming with the Pittsburgh Crawfords and Baltimore Elite Giants. Harvey tossed a scoreless inning in the 1943 East–West All-Star Game, and served in the United States Army during World War II. He died in Baltimore, Maryland in 1989 at age 80.
