= Sack Morgan =

American baseball player

- Pitcher
- Threw: Left

Negro league baseball debut
- 1945, for the Baltimore Elite Giants

Last appearance
- 1948, for the Memphis Red Sox

Teams
- Baltimore Elite Giants (1945); Memphis Red Sox (1948)

William Lee Morgan, nicknamed "Sack", is an American former Negro league baseball pitcher who played in the 1940s.

Morgan made his Negro leagues debut in 1945 with the Baltimore Elite Giants. In nine recorded appearances on the mound for Baltimore, he worked 38.1 innings and posted a 3–3 record with 21 strikeouts. Morgan went on to play for the Memphis Red Sox in 1948.
