= Frank Russell (baseball) =

American baseball player

- Infielder
- Born: May 8, 1921; Nashville, Tennessee, U.S.
- Died: January 1984 (aged 62); Nashville, Tennessee, U.S.
- Batted: Right Threw: Right

Negro league baseball debut
- 1943, for the Baltimore Elite Giants

Last appearance
- 1948, for the Baltimore Elite Giants

Teams
- Baltimore Elite Giants (1943–1944, 1946, 1948)

Frank Russell (May 8, 1921 – January 1984), nicknamed "Junior", was an American Negro league infielder in the 1940s.

A native of Nashville, Tennessee, Russell made his Negro leagues debut in 1943 with the Baltimore Elite Giants. He served in the United States Army during World War II. After returning from his service, Russell rejoined the Elite Giants for the 1946 and 1948 seasons. He died in Nashville in 1984 at age 62.
