= George Nash (baseball) =

American baseball player

- Pitcher
- Born: March 31, 1907; Birmingham, Alabama, U.S.
- Died: October 1976; Cleveland, Ohio, U.S.
- Batted: Unknown Threw: Left

Negro league baseball debut
- 1928, for the Birmingham Black Barons

Last appearance
- 1933, for the Indianapolis ABCs/Detroit Stars

Teams
- Birmingham Black Barons (1928, 1932); Memphis Red Sox (1929); Nashville Elite Giants (1932); Indianapolis ABCs/Detroit Stars (1933)

George Granderson Nash (March 31, 1907 – October 1976), also listed as William Nash, was an American professional baseball pitcher in the Negro leagues. He played with the Birmingham Black Barons, Memphis Red Sox, Nashville Elite Giants, and Indianapolis ABCs/Detroit Stars from 1928 to 1933.
