= Eddie Berry (shortstop) =

- Shortstop
- Batted: Unknown Threw: Unknown

Negro league baseball debut
- 1930, for the Memphis Red Sox

Last appearance
- 1930, for the Memphis Red Sox
- Stats at Baseball Reference

Teams
- Memphis Red Sox (1930)

Eddie Berry was an American professional baseball shortstop in the Negro leagues. He played with the Memphis Red Sox in 1930.
