= Henry Kimbro =

American baseball player (1912–1999)

- Outfielder
- Born: February 10, 1912; Nashville, Tennessee, U.S.
- Died: July 11, 1999 (aged 87); Nashville, Tennessee, U.S.
- Batted: Left Threw: Right

Negro league baseball debut
- 1937, for the Washington Elite Giants

Last appearance
- 1948, for the Baltimore Elite Giants

Career statistics
- Batting average: .301
- Hits: 632
- Home runs: 29
- Runs batted in: 277
- Stolen bases: 65

Teams
- Washington / Baltimore Elite Giants (1937–1940); New York Black Yankees (1941); Baltimore Elite Giants (1942–1948)

Career highlights and awards
- 7× All-Star (1941, 1943, 1944, 1946, 1947); Negro National League batting champion (1947)

Henry Allen Kimbro (February 10, 1912 – July 11, 1999), nicknamed "Jimbo", was an American Negro league baseball outfielder from the late 1930s through the early 1950s. He played for the Washington Elite Giants, Baltimore Elite Giants, and the New York Black Yankees and managed the Birmingham Black Barons from 1952 to 1953 before retiring from baseball.

Kimbro was a lead-off hitter for most of his professional baseball career, owing to his patience at the plate and speed around the base paths. Notable accomplishments include finishing third in batting average twice; .371 in 1946, .363 in 1947. He appeared in six East-West All-Star Games.

In 1939, the Elite Giants made the postseason in unique circumstances. They participated in a four-team tournament that matched them against the Newark Eagles. He batted .313 with a run batted in as the Giants won in four games. In the League Championship Series, facing the legendary Homestead Grays, he batted .167 with three hits in five games, but they prevailed over Homestead for their first and only pennant. 1940, he led the Negro National League in runs (48), walks (39) along with at-bats (213) and plate appearances (254). In 1947, he led the league in runs (69), hits (93), doubles (24), RBI (52) to go along with a .384/.448/.624 batting line. He was the second Elite Giant to win a league batting title (teammate Roy Campanella won it 1945 and Lester Lockett would later win it in 1948). He also played for Havana in the Cuban Winter League during the 1947–48 season.

In 1948, he played a league high 58 games in the final major league season of the Negro leagues. He batted .269, but he walked 58 times to lead the league in on-base percentage for .450 while also leading the league in plate appearances (265), hit by pitch (seven), and runs (53). In 1948, the Giants contended for the league pennant once more. In four games, Kimbro batted .615 with eight hits, but Homestead beat Baltimore. In batting, Kimbro ranks highly among all-time statistics in Elite Giants history: first in hits (599), Wins above replacement (14.4), games (511), walks (285), stolen bases (55), and runs batted in (264). As a center fielder, he led the league in games five times, putouts three times, assists twice, and errors twice.

Kimbro once hit a home run over the roof of Briggs Stadium in Detroit.

In 2004, Kimbro was posthumously inducted into the Tennessee Sports Hall of Fame.

Kimbro was honored by the Nashville Sounds on June 19, 2024, by giving away bobble heads.
