= New Orleans Crescent Stars =

Negro league baseball club

The New Orleans Crescent Stars were an independent Negro league baseball club that existed from 1933 to 1934.

The New Orleans team helped produce several players as Pepper Bassett, Gene Bremer, Lloyd Davenport, Harry Else, Barney Morris, Tom Parker, Red Parnell, Hilton Smith and Felton Snow, who managed them at one point.

The team played at Crescent Star Park.
