= Bob Romby =

American baseball player

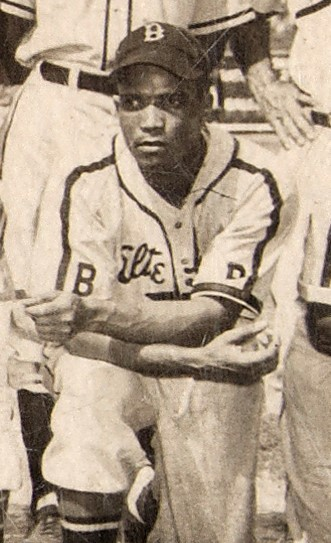
- Pitcher / Right fielder
- Born: December 15, 1918; Shreveport, Louisiana, U.S.
- Died: November 25, 2004 (aged 85); Farmville, Virginia, U.S.
- Batted: Left Threw: Left

Negro league baseball debut
- 1946, for the Baltimore Elite Giants

Last appearance
- 1950, for the Baltimore Elite Giants

Negro National League statistics
- Win–loss record: 17–9
- Earned run average: 2.74
- Strikeouts: 183
- Batting average: .184
- Home runs: 2
- Runs batted in: 13

Teams
- Baltimore Elite Giants (1946–1950)

Career highlights and awards
- 2× NgL All-Star (1947(1), 1947²); Negro National League strikeout leader (1947)

Robert Lee Romby (December 15, 1918 – November 25, 2004) was an American professional baseball pitcher and right fielder from 1946 to 1950 in the Negro leagues.

A native of Shreveport, Louisiana, Romby served in the US Army during World War II. He made his Negro leagues debut in 1946 for the Baltimore Elite Giants, and played for Baltimore through 1950. In 1948, Romby was selected to represent the Elite Giants in the East–West All-Star Game, and in 1949 he was part of Baltimore's Negro American League championship club. Romby died in Farmville, Virginia in 2004 at age 85.
