= Cyril Byron =

Tuskegee Airman and American baseball player (1920–2015)

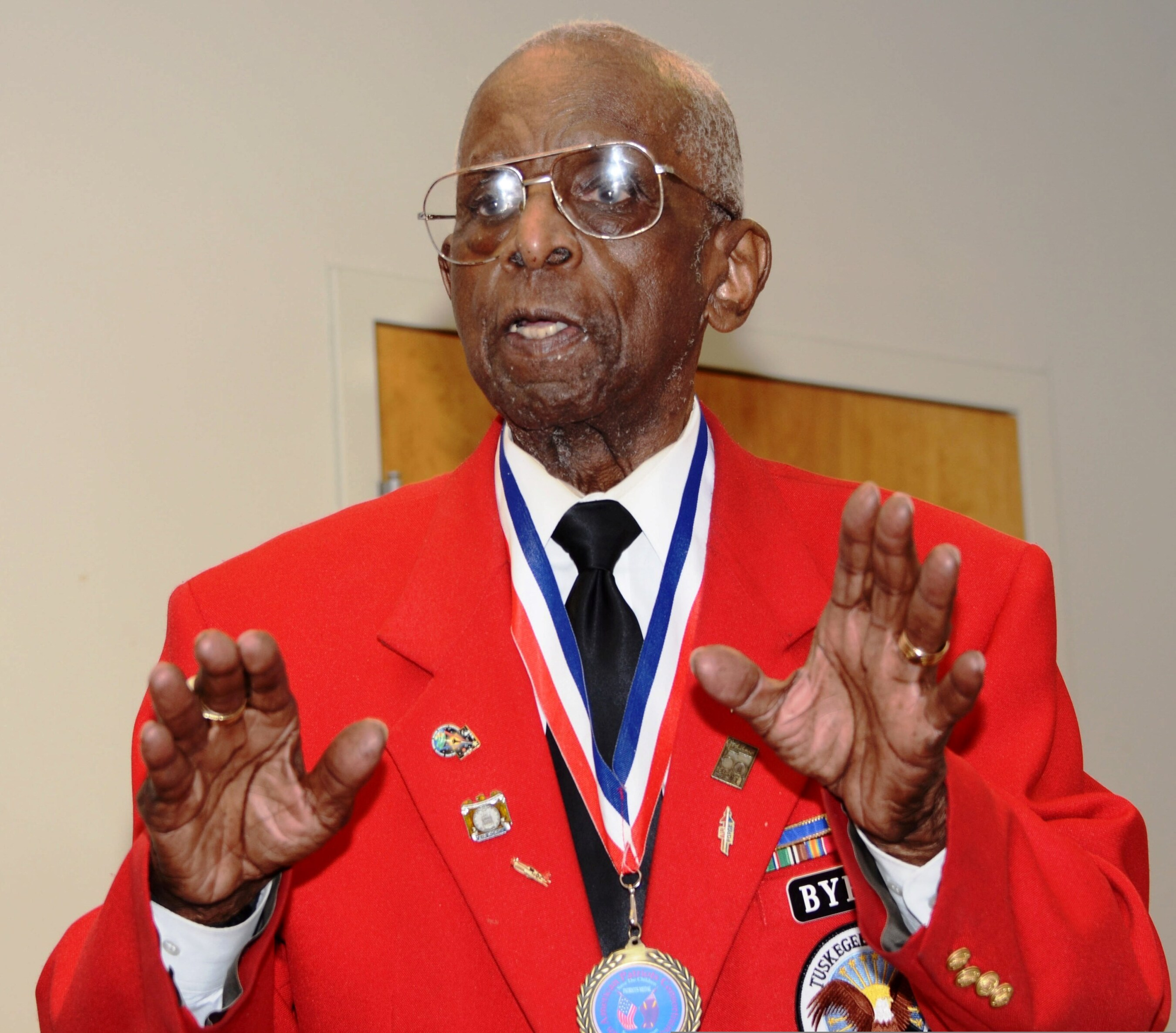
- Byron in 2012
- Catcher
- Born: April 15, 1920; New York, New York, U.S.
- Died: October 20, 2015 (aged 95); Fort Washington, Maryland, U.S.

Negro league baseball debut
- 1946, for the Baltimore Elite Giants

Last appearance
- 1946, for the Baltimore Elite Giants

Career statistics
- Batting average: .200
- Home runs: 0
- Runs batted in: 0

Teams
- Baltimore Elite Giants (1946)

Cyril Osbourne Byron Sr. (April 15, 1920 – October 20, 2015) was an American Negro league catcher and a member of the Tuskegee Airmen who served in World War II.

== Biography ==
A native of New York, New York and the son of Jamaican immigrants, Byron graduated from Morris High School in 1939. He went on to be a star quarterback at Morgan State College. In 1941, Byron joined the Tuskegee Airmen and served in North Africa and Sicily in World War II. After the war, he played for the Baltimore Elite Giants in 1946, and graduated from Morgan State with a degree in chemistry in 1947.

Unable to find work as a research chemist, he spent four years as an officer with the Port Authority of New York and New Jersey (PANYNJ) Police Department. According to the PANYNJ, he is believed to be the first black officer in the agency's history.

While working for the PAPD's George Washington Bridge Command, Byron earned a master's degree in education from New York University in 1952. He earned a doctorate from Temple University in 1974. He enjoyed a long career as a professor, coach, and administrator at Fort Valley State College, Coppin State College, and Baltimore City Community College, retiring in 1991.

Byron was inducted into the Morgan State University Athletic Hall of Fame in 1973, the Baltimore Community College Hall of Fame in 2011 and Coppin State University Hall of Fame in 2012. He and other Tuskegee Airmen were awarded the Congressional Gold Medal in 2007 by President George W. Bush, and he attended the two inauguration ceremonies of Barack Obama at Obama's invitation. Byron died in Fort Washington, Maryland in 2015 at age 95.
