= Woody Williams (pitcher, born 1918) =

American baseball player

- Pitcher
- Born: August 23, 1918; Nolensville, Tennessee, U.S.
- Died: May 22, 1990 (aged 71); Chicago, Illinois, U.S.
- Threw: Right

Negro league baseball debut
- 1937, for the Washington Elite Giants

Last appearance
- 1940, for the Baltimore Elite Giants

Teams
- Washington/Baltimore Elite Giants (1937-1938, 1940)

Woodrow Wilson Williams (August 23, 1918 – May 22, 1990) was an American Negro league baseball pitcher in the 1940s.

A native of Nolensville, Tennessee, Williams played for the Washington Elite Giants in 1937 and played with the team after it moved to Baltimore in 1938 and 1940. In 21 recorded appearances on the mound, he posted a 5–3 record with a 5.04 ERA over 69.2 innings. Williams died in Chicago, Illinois in 1990 at age 71.
