= Lloyd Scott (baseball) =

American baseball player (1910–1973)

- Second baseman
- Born: September 17, 1910; Yazoo City, Mississippi, U.S.
- Died: January 3, 1973 (aged 62); Friars Point, Mississippi, U.S.

Negro league baseball debut
- 1934, for the Chicago American Giants

Last appearance
- 1934, for the Nashville Elite Giants
- Stats at Baseball Reference

Teams
- Chicago American Giants (1934); Nashville Elite Giants (1934)

Lloyd Cortez Scott (September 17, 1910 – January 3, 1973) was an American Negro league second baseman who played in the 1930s.

== Biography ==
Scott attended Alcorn State University, and played for the Chicago American Giants and Nashville Elite Giants in 1934. In 19 recorded games, he posted 12 hits and six RBI in 67 plate appearances. He died in Friars Point, Mississippi on January 3, 1973, at the age of 62.
