= Sammy T. Hughes =

American baseball player (1910–1981)

- Second baseman
- Born: October 20, 1910; Louisville, Kentucky, U.S.
- Died: August 9, 1981 (aged 70); Los Angeles, California, U.S.
- Batted: Right Threw: Right

debut
- 1930, for the Louisville White Sox

Last appearance
- 1942, for the Baltimore Elite Giants
- Stats at Baseball Reference

Teams
- Louisville White Sox (1930–1931); Washington Pilots (1932); Nashville Elite Giants (1933–1934); Columbus Elite Giants (1935); Washington Elite Giants (1936–1937); NNL All Stars Team (1937); Baltimore Elite Giants (1935–1942); Unión Laguna de Torreón (1941)

Samuel Thomas Hughes (October 20, 1910 – August 9, 1981) was an American second baseman in baseball's Negro leagues.

Born in Louisville, Kentucky, Hughes played primarily for the Elite Giants through their various stops in Nashville, Columbus, Washington, D.C., and Baltimore, always in the Negro National League. He served in the US Army during World War II. At age 42, Hughes received votes listing him on the 1952 Pittsburgh Courier player-voted poll of the Negro leagues' best players ever. Hughes died at age 70 in Los Angeles.
