= Alfred Wilmore =

American baseball player

- Pitcher
- Born: November 15, 1924; Philadelphia, Pennsylvania, US
- Died: March 3, 1996 (aged 71); Philadelphia, Pennsylvania, US
- Batted: Right Threw: Right

Negro league baseball debut
- 1946, for the Philadelphia Stars

Last appearance
- 1950, for the Baltimore Elite Giants

Teams
- Philadelphia Stars (1946–1947); Baltimore Elite Giants (1948–1950)

Alfred Gardner Wilmore (November 15, 1924 – March 3, 1996), nicknamed "Apples", was an American Negro league pitcher for the Philadelphia Stars and Baltimore Elite Giants between 1946 and 1950.

A native of Philadelphia, Pennsylvania, Wilmore was the middle of three sons born to a mother who was a domestic worker and a father who was an office clerk. His father, a World War I veteran, founded the first Black American Legion Post in the state of Pennsylvania. Wilmore's older brother, Gayraud Wilmore Jr., was a theologian and historian; his younger brother, Jacques Wilmore, was a civil rights worker.

Al Wilmore attended Benjamin Franklin High School. He acquired his nickname as a child, preferring to spend his money on apples rather than candy, and then eating the entire apple.

Wilmore served in the US Army during World War II. After returning from war, he spent several seasons in the Negro leagues, and was selected to play in the 1949 East–West All-Star Game as a member of the Baltimore Elite Giants. Wilmore was signed by the Philadelphia Athletics in 1952, and played for the minor league Lincoln A's, but did not reach the major league level. Wilmore died in Philadelphia in 1996 at age 71.
