= Frazier Robinson =

American baseball player (1910–1997)

- Catcher
- Born: May 30, 1910; Birmingham, Alabama, U.S.
- Died: October 13, 1997 (aged 87); Kings Mountain, North Carolina, U.S.
- Batted: Right Threw: Right

Negro league baseball debut
- 1942, for the Kansas City Monarchs

Last appearance
- 1950, for the Baltimore Elite Giants

Teams
- Kansas City Monarchs (1942–1943); New York Black Yankees (1943); Baltimore Elite Giants (1943, 1946–1950)

Henry Frazier Robinson (May 30, 1910 – October 13, 1997), nicknamed "Slow", was an American Negro league catcher for the Kansas City Monarchs, New York Black Yankees, and Baltimore Elite Giants between 1942 and 1950.

A native of Birmingham, Alabama, Robinson was the brother of fellow Negro leaguer Norman Robinson, and served in the US Navy during World War II. Robinson died in Kings Mountain, North Carolina in 1997 at age 87.
