= Bailey McCauley =

American baseball player

- Pitcher
- Born: August 3, 1896; Sparta, Tennessee, U.S.
- Died: March 20, 1965 (aged 68); Santa Ana, California, U.S.

Negro league baseball debut
- 1930, for the Nashville Elite Giants

Last appearance
- 1930, for the Nashville Elite Giants
- Stats at Baseball Reference

Teams
- Nashville Elite Giants (1930)

Bailey McCauley (August 3, 1896 – March 20, 1965) was an American Negro league baseball pitcher who played in the 1930s.

McCauley played for the Nashville Elite Giants in 1930. In 13 recorded games, he posted 7.83 ERA over 46 innings.
