= Eddie Berry (pitcher) =

American baseball player

- Pitcher
- Born: October 16, 1918; Danville, Kentucky, U.S.
- Died: November 25, 1981 (aged 63); Lexington, Kentucky, U.S.
- Batted: Unknown Threw: Unknown

Negro league baseball debut
- 1943, for the Baltimore Elite Giants

Last appearance
- 1943, for the Baltimore Elite Giants
- Stats at Baseball Reference

Teams
- Baltimore Elite Giants (1943)

William Edward Berry (October 16, 1918 – November 25, 1981) was an American professional baseball pitcher in the Negro leagues. He played with the Baltimore Elite Giants in 1943.
