= Hoss Walker =

American baseball player

- Shortstop
- Born: September 10, 1904; Austin, Texas, U.S.
- Died: February 10, 1971 (aged 66); Nashville, Tennessee, U.S.
- Batted: Right Threw: Right

Negro league baseball debut
- 1929, for the Bacharach Giants

Last appearance
- 1948, for the Baltimore Elite Giants

Teams
- As player: Bacharach Giants (1929); Cleveland Cubs (1931); Nashville Elite Giants (1932–1934); Columbus Elite Giants (1935); Homestead Grays (1936); Washington Elite Giants (1936–1937); Memphis Red Sox (1938); Baltimore Elite Giants (1938–1940); New York Black Yankees (1940–1941); Birmingham Black Barons (1941–1943); Indianapolis Clowns (1944–1947); Baltimore Elite Giants (1948); As manager: Indianapolis Clowns (1944–1947); Baltimore Elite Giants (1948–1949)

Jesse Walker (September 10, 1904 – February 10, 1971), nicknamed "Hoss", was an American Negro league shortstop and manager from the 1920s into the 1950s.

A native of Austin, Texas, Walker made his Negro leagues debut in 1929 with the Bacharach Giants. He went on to enjoy a 20-year playing career, and was a successful manager for many years. He was selected to manage the East team at the East–West All-Star Game in 1949 and 1950.
