= Judge Owens =

American baseball player

- Infielder
- Born: November 3, 1916; Milner, Georgia, U.S.
- Died: November 22, 2001 (aged 85); Queens, New York, U.S.
- Batted: Left Threw: Right

Negro league baseball debut
- 1943, for the Atlanta Black Crackers

Last appearance
- 1943, for the Baltimore Elite Giants

Teams
- Atlanta Black Crackers (1943); Baltimore Elite Giants (1943)

Judge Owens (November 3, 1916 – November 22, 2001), nicknamed "Dusty", was an American Negro league infielder in the 1940s.

A native of Milner, Georgia, Owens played for the Atlanta Black Crackers in 1943, and also played for the Baltimore Elite Giants that season. In seven recorded games, he posted ten hits in 30 plate appearances. Owens died in Queens, New York, in 2001 at age 85.
