= Lester Lockett =

Negro League Baseball player (1912–2005)

- Left fielder / Third baseman
- Born: March 25, 1912; Princeton, Indiana, U.S.
- Died: October 4, 2005 (aged 93); Chicago, Illinois, U.S.
- Batted: Right Threw: Right

Negro league baseball debut
- 1937, for the St. Louis Stars

Last appearance
- 1948, for the Baltimore Elite Giants

Career statistics
- Batting average: .286
- Home runs: 9
- Runs batted in: 184

Teams
- St. Louis Stars (1937); Birmingham Black Barons (1938); Chicago American Giants (1939); Birmingham Black Barons (1941–1942); Chicago American Giants (1942); Birmingham Black Barons (1943–1946); Indianapolis Clowns (1946); Baltimore Elite Giants (1947–1948)

Career highlights and awards
- 4× All-Star (1943, 1945, 1948); Negro National League batting champion (1948)

Lester Lockett (March 25, 1912 – October 4, 2005) was an American professional baseball left fielder and third baseman in the Negro leagues. He played from 1937 to 1948 with several teams.

In February 1997, he was living at a YMCA in Lake View, Chicago and carried a briefcase full of memorabilia from his baseball career.
