= Butch McCord =

American baseball player

- Born: November 2, 1925; Nashville, Tennessee, U.S.
- Died: January 27, 2011 (aged 85); Nashville, Tennessee, U.S.

Teams
- Nashville Cubs; Nashville Black Vols; Baltimore Elite Giants (1948–1950); Chicago American Giants (1950)

Clinton Hill McCord (November 2, 1925 – January 27, 2011) was an American professional baseball player who played in the Negro leagues from 1947 to 1950 before spending over a decade in minor league ball. In the Negro leagues, he suited up for the Nashville Cubs, Nashville Black Vols, Baltimore Elite Giants (1948–1950) and Chicago American Giants (1950).

He joined organized baseball in 1951, hitting .363 and .392 his first two seasons, pacing the Mississippi–Ohio Valley League both years. After a down year in 1953, he came back to hit .358 in 1954, leading the Western League. Overall, McCord hit .306 with 1,435 hits, 279 doubles, 64 triples and 89 home runs in 1,312 games.

McCord was born and died in Nashville, Tennessee. He served in the United States Marine Corps in 1944 and 1945. While playing baseball, he attended Tennessee State University on a football scholarship.
