= Jim Gilliam =

American baseball player (1928–1978)

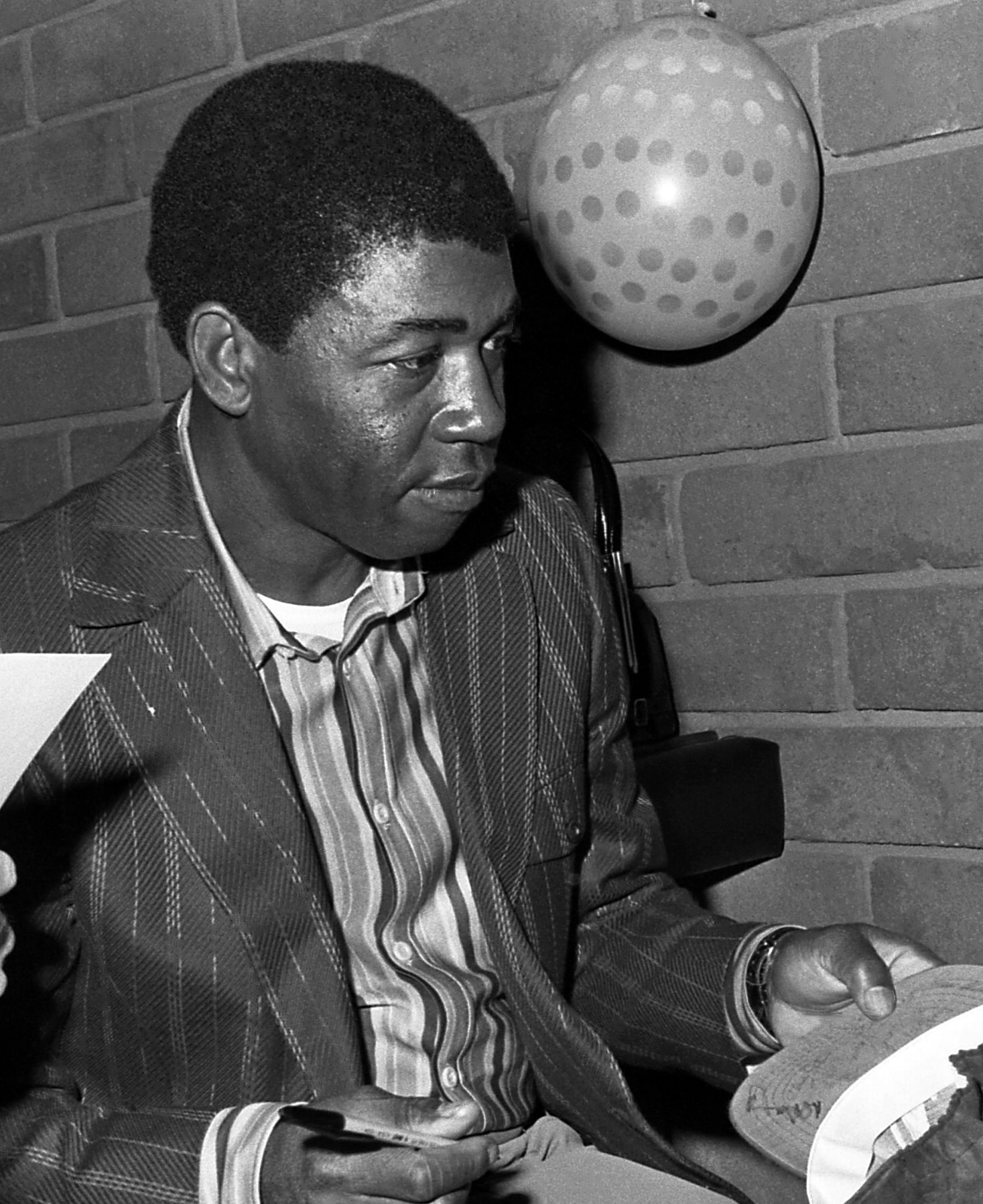
- Gilliam in 1971
- Second baseman / Third baseman
- Born: October 17, 1928; Nashville, Tennessee, U.S.
- Died: October 8, 1978 (aged 49); Inglewood, California, U.S.
- Batted: Switch Threw: Right

Professional debut
- NgL: 1946, for the Baltimore Elite Giants
- MLB: April 14, 1953, for the Brooklyn Dodgers

Last MLB appearance
- September 30, 1966, for the Los Angeles Dodgers

MLB (Note: On December 16, 2020, Major League Baseball declared the Negro leagues, from the span of 1920–1948, to be a "Major League". Gilliam's statistics reflect his time in the Negro leagues from 1946–1948.) statistics
- Batting average: .266
- Hits: 2,021
- Home runs: 65
- Runs batted in: 625
- Stats at Baseball Reference

Teams
- Baltimore Elite Giants (1946–1950); Brooklyn / Los Angeles Dodgers (1953–1966); As coach: Los Angeles Dodgers (1964–1978)

Career highlights and awards
- 2× NgL All-Star (1948, 1948²); 2× All-Star (1956, 1959); 4× World Series champion (1955, 1959, 1963, 1965); NL Rookie of the Year (1953); Los Angeles Dodgers No. 19 retired

James William "Junior" Gilliam (October 17, 1928 – October 8, 1978) was an American second baseman, third baseman, and coach in Negro league and Major League Baseball. He began his baseball career in the Negro leagues in 1946 and became an All-Star second baseman with the Baltimore Elite Giants. He was signed by the Brooklyn Dodgers in 1951 and joined the major leagues in 1953. He was named the 1953 National League (NL) Rookie of the Year and was a key member of ten National League championship teams from 1953 to 1978 that spanned their time in Brooklyn and later Los Angeles. As the leadoff hitter for most of the 1950s, he scored over 100 runs in each of his first four seasons and led the National League in triples in 1953 and walks in 1959. In his time as a major league player, he collected over 2,000 hits. In 1964, Gilliam became one of the first African American coaches while still an active player and became a full-time coach at first base in 1966, where he resided until his death.

== Early life ==
Gilliam was born on October 17, 1928, in Nashville, Tennessee to James Sr. and Katherine (Duval) Gilliam. He attended Pearl High School in Nashville, playing baseball and starring at halfback in football, but dropped out during his junior or senior year to pursue playing professional baseball.

== Negro leagues ==
Gilliam began playing on a local semi-pro team at age 14. In 1943 and/or 1944, he played for a local Nashville baseball team called the Crawfords. In 1945, Crawfords' owner Paul Jones put together a team, the Nashville Black Vols, as a Negro League farm team of the Negro National League's Baltimore Elite Giants. Jones paid Gilliam to play for the team, and Gilliam got permission from his mother to leave high school at 16. The Elite Giants originally brought Gilliam up as a reserve infielder in 1946. He would play on the team from 1946 to 1950. He received his nickname, "Junior", at 16-years old because he was the Giants' youngest player.

He played in only 21 games with 48 at bats in 1946, but had a .257 batting average in 59 games the following season. In these first two seasons, Gilliam was a weak right-handed hitter against curveballs thrown by right-handed pitchers. His manager George "Tubby" Scales worked with Gilliam to learn batting left-handed as well as right-handed, successfully making Gilliam a switch hitter. Scales also managed Gilliam in Puerto Rican winter baseball, where Gilliam played three seasons.

In 1948, his batting average rose to .289, and he made the East All-Star team. In 1949, Gilliam's average was .302. He was voted an All-Star for the East three straight years from 1948 to 1950.

The Brooklyn Dodgers purchased Gilliam's contract rights from the Elite Giants for $4,000.

== Minor leagues ==
In 1951, he was signed as an amateur free agent by the Brooklyn Dodgers, who sent him to play for their Triple-A International League (IL) farm team, the Montreal Royals. The Royals were managed by Walter Alston during Gilliam's two years playing for them. In 1951, he played in 152 games, both at second base and in the outfield, batting .287, with 117 runs scored, 117 bases on balls, a .413 on base percentage (OBP), and 15 stolen bases. In 1952 for the Royals, he hit .301, with nine home runs, nine triples, 39 doubles, 111 runs, 112 runs batted in (RBI), 100 bases on balls, a .411 OBP, 18 stolen bases, and an .862 OPS (on-base plus slugging). He played the vast majority of his games at second base. He led the International League in runs in both 1951 and 1952, and was the IL's most valuable player in 1952.

After signing with the Dodgers, Gilliam could not play for the team's Double-A affiliate, the Fort Worth Cats, as blacks were still barred from the Texas League. In 1952, pitcher Dave Hoskins became the first black player in the Texas League.

== Brooklyn Dodgers ==
Gilliam made his debut with the Dodgers in April 1953, with the formidable task of taking over second base from future Hall of fame second baseman Jackie Robinson, who broke the color barrier in major league baseball in 1947. In 1953, Robinson was shifted to the outfield (76 games) and third base (44 games). Robinson made the effort to teach Gilliam how to properly play second base. Teammate and future Hall of Fame shortstop Pee Wee Reese was also an inspiration to Gilliam, and treated his black teammates with respect, making Gilliam feel relaxed on the team. Gilliam led all NL players in games played at second base (149) and his .976 fielding percentage was third in the league in 1953.

Gilliam also proved capable as a hitter, batting .278 with a team-leading 125 runs for the National League champions. His 17 triples led all major league hitters, and remain the most by a Dodger since 1920. Gilliam also led the league in plate appearances (710) and was second in the NL (behind Stan Musial and tied with Ralph Kiner) with 100 walks, and third with 21 stolen bases (one behind teammate Reese); though he was also caught stealing a league leading 14 times. He was the first rookie to draw 100 walks. For his excellent season he earned National League Rookie of the Year honors, as well as The Sporting News Rookie of the Year Award.

He continued to play well during the team's Brooklyn years. In 1954, Walter Alston took over as the Dodgers manager. Gilliam hit .282 with a career-high 13 home runs, scoring 107 runs. He played 143 games at second base, with a .977 fielding percentage (fifth best in the NL). In 1955, the Dodgers defeated the Yankees four games to three in the World Series. During the regular season, Gilliam's average slipped to .249, but he scored over 100 runs (110) for the third consecutive year. He hit .292 in the World Series.

The Dodgers won the NL pennant in 1956, losing to the Yankees 4–3 in the World Series. During the regular season, Gilliam batted a career-best .300, with 95 walks and a .399 OBP. He scored over 100 runs (102) for the fourth consecutive year. He played 102 games at second base and 56 in the outfield. Gilliam made his first major league All-Star team, though he did not get in the game, on a NL team managed by Walter Alston. He also finished fifth in voting for the National League's League Baseball Most Valuable Player Award (MVP), won by teammate Don Newcombe.

He was again second in the league in walks (95, behind teammate Duke Snider) and steals (21, behind Willie Mays' 40). Snider finished just above him in OBP for league best, both at .399; and he was fifth in the NL in runs. On July 21 of that year, he tied John Montgomery Ward's 1892 major league record of 12 assists in a game by a second baseman, a record since tied (but never surpassed as of 2024), by seven other second basemen.

By 1957, he was considered the best leadoff hitter in the NL. After proving himself in Brooklyn, his teammates no longer called him Junior, but Jim. He was the full-time second baseman again (148 games). In the Dodgers' last season in Brooklyn in 1957, he batted .250 but led the National League in putouts (407) and fielding percentage (.986) and again finished second behind Mays (38) with 26 stolen bases. He scored 89 runs, the first time in the major leagues he had less than 100 in a season. Jackie Robinson had retired before the season started, after being traded to the New York Giants. The Dodgers finished the season in third place, with an 84–70 record.

== Los Angeles Dodgers ==
1960 Jay Publishing card of Gilliam for Los Angeles Dodgers

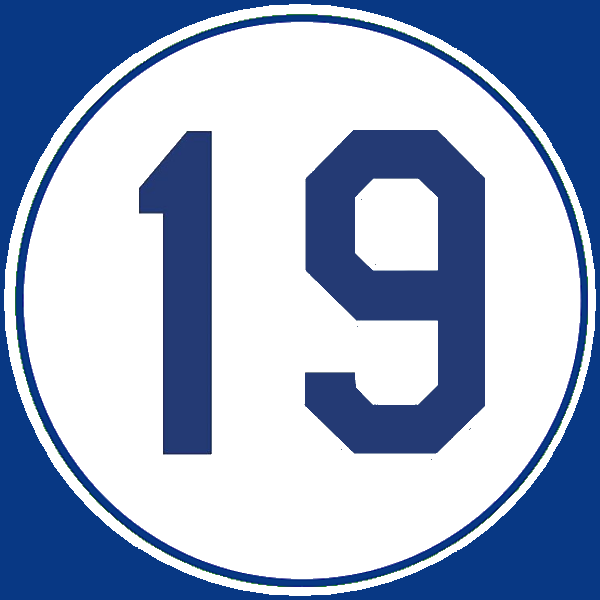
Jim Gilliam's number 19 was retired by the Los Angeles Dodgers in 1978.

The Dodgers moved to Los Angeles before the 1958 season. Gilliam continued to star with the team after their 1958 move to Los Angeles, though he gradually shifted to third base. In 1958, he played 75 games in the outfield, 44 at third base and 32 at second base; the first time he played third base since his early days with the Elite Giants. In 1959, he was the Dodgers' full-time third baseman.

In 1958, he hit .261, with 81 runs, 18 stolen bases and was 19th in NL MVP voting. The Dodgers were in the World Series again in 1959, defeating the Chicago White Sox four games to two. During the season, Gilliam hit .282, with 96 walks, 91 runs, a .387 OBP and 23 stolen bases. His 96 bases on balls led the National League, and he was tied for second in stolen bases (once again behind Mays who had 27), and sixth in OBP. In his first season at third base, his .958 fielding percentage was fifth best in the NL. In 1959, Gilliam was again an All-Star, but this time as a third baseman. He played in the second All-Star game that year, on August 3, hitting a home run off of Billy O'Dell.

In 1960, he played 130 games at third base and 30 at second base. He hit only .248, but had 96 walks (3rd in the NL) and 96 runs (8th in the NL). In 1961, he played 74 games at third base, but started only 35 games there, while starting 66 at second base and nine in the outfield; batting .244, with 79 walks and 74 runs. In 1962, he started 96 games at second base and 60 at third base, batting .270, with 93 walks and 83 runs.

Maury Wills became the Dodgers full-time shortstop in 1960. Wills became the team's leadoff hitter, and Gilliam moved to the second spot in the batting order, behind Wills. In 1962, Wills set an all-time record for stolen bases with 104, the first player ever to steal more than 100 bases in a season. Wills credited Gilliam's self-sacrifice and discipline as the second hitter, as being critical to his setting the stolen base record. Major league player and manager Dusty Baker, who had been mentored by Gilliam as a young player, described Gilliam's role: "'That second hitter has to be a double leadoff man, patient. You hope he can run, take pitches, so the guy ahead of him can steal. He almost has to be your smartest guy in the lineup....'"

The Dodgers won the National pennant again in 1963, with Gilliam once again the starting second baseman. At 34-years old, he batted .282, with 77 runs, 60 walks and 19 stolen bases. He placed sixth in that year's NL MVP vote. The Dodgers swept the 104-win New York Yankees 4–0 in the 1963 World Series.

The Dodgers fell to 6th place in 1964, with an 80–82 record. Gilliam started only 79 games (chiefly at third base), with only 390 plate appearances and a .228 average. This was his first major league season with less than 531 plate appearances. At the end of the season, Gilliam was named a coach by Dodgers manager Walter Alston, replacing Leo Durocher, becoming the third African-American to hold a major league coaching position. Gilliam intended 1964 to be his last playing year, but team injuries resulted in his seeing substantial play at third base in 1965 (80 games) and 1966 (70 games), with the team again winning the National League championship in both seasons. He also played 22 games in the outfield and five games at second base in 1965.

In 1965 he was part of the major leagues' first all-switch-hitting infield, with shortstop Wills, first baseman Wes Parker, and second baseman Jim Lefebvre. On September 5, Gilliam hit a 2-run pinch triple in a road game against the Houston Astros, giving the Dodgers a 3–2 lead in the ninth inning. The Los Angeles Rams were playing a preseason home game against the Philadelphia Eagles at the Coliseum. The Rams were playing so poorly despite their 10–0 win that the biggest cheer from the stands came from people listening to portable radios tuned to the Dodger game who cheered when Gilliam got the hit.

He finally retired as a player following the 1966 season with a .266 career batting average, 2,021 hits, 1,255 runs, 65 home runs, 625 runs batted in, 325 doubles, 80 triples, 1,036 walks, and 219 stolen bases over 17 seasons. Defensively, he recorded an overall .973 fielding percentage.

He was also nicknamed the "Devil" on the Dodgers because of his pool hall prowess.

== Post-season games ==
Gilliam played in seven World Series with the Dodgers, four of them against the New York Yankees.

=== 1950s ===
In the 1953 World Series against the Yankees, he singled to lead off Game 1, and had a solo homer in the fifth inning batting left-handed against Allie Reynolds. He hit three doubles, scoring once and driving in two runs, in the 7–3 Game 4 victory. Gilliam had another home run, this time batting right-handed, in the 11–7 loss in Game 5. Overall, he hit .296, with three doubles, two home runs and four RBIs.

In addition to hitting .292 in the 1955 World Series, he had seven base hits, eight walks and a .469 OBP, with three RBIs. In Game 3 of the 1955 World Series, he drew a walk with the bases loaded in the second inning to give the Dodgers the lead for good. In Game 4, he drove in the first run of the 8–5 Dodgers' victory. The Dodgers won in seven games for their first Series championship.

In the 1956 World Series, he walked with one out in the tenth inning of Game 6 and scored on a single by Robinson to give the Dodgers a 1–0 victory, tying the Series. In Game 5, he struck out to start the game and grounded out twice in the perfect game pitched by the Yankees' Don Larsen. Gilliam played all seven games in the Series, with two hits and seven bases on balls. The Yankees won the Series 4–3.

He was also on Dodgers team that won the World Series in 1959 against the Chicago White Sox, four games to two. Gilliam played in all six games, batting .240.

=== 1960s ===
In the 1963 World Series Gilliam played in all four games, hitting only .154. However, he played an important role in the Dodgers winning Games 3 and 4. Gilliam scored the only run of Game 3 in the first inning. He walked and advanced to second base on a Jim Bouton wild pitch, later scoring on a Tommy Davis base hit. In Game 4, future Hall of fame left-handed pitchers Sandy Koufax (Dodgers) and Whitey Ford (Yankees) faced each other. The Yankees had tied the game 1–1 in the top of the 7th inning. In the bottom of the inning, Gilliam advanced all the way to third base on an error by Joe Pepitone on a throw from Clete Boyer. He scored on a Willie Davis sacrifice fly to give the Dodgers a 2–1 win and a four game Series sweep.

He started all seven games of the 1965 World Series against the Minnesota Twins, in a year that began with him being a retired player. He made the key defensive play of Game 7 to preserve Sandy Koufax’s 2–0 shutout victory that won the World Series for the Dodgers.

His final major league appearance was in Game 2 of the 1966 World Series against the Baltimore Orioles. The Dodgers lost the series four games to none. Gilliam played in only two games, without a hit.

== Coach and manager ==
Gilliam served as a player-coach in 1965-66, and became a full-time first-base coach in 1967. He continued as a coach with the Dodgers until his death in 1978, including three more Dodger pennant teams in 1974, 1977, and 1978; they lost the World Series in each year.

In 1973, he managed the San Juan team in the Puerto Rican winter league.

== Honors ==
In October of 1953, he received a scroll and key to the city from Nashville mayor Ben West. In 1995, he was inducted into the Tennessee Sports Hall of Fame.

== Death and legacy ==
Gilliam suffered a massive brain hemorrhage at his home on September 15, 1978, and, following surgery, lapsed into a coma from which he did not recover. He died in Inglewood, California, on October 8, 1978, nine days before his 50th birthday and one day after the Dodgers clinched their tenth pennant during his tenure in the 1978 National League Championship Series.

Reverend Jesse Jackson officiated at his funeral, which was attended by 2,000 people. Those giving eulogies included the Yankees' Reggie Jackson, who was playing against the Dodgers in the World Series. Gilliam was buried with his uniform. His uniform number 19 was retired by the Dodgers two days after his death, prior to Game 1 of the 1978 World Series. He and Fernando Valenzuela are the only Dodgers whose numbers have been retired but are not in the Hall of Fame. He is interred in the Inglewood Park Cemetery, in Inglewood, California.

The Dodgers wore a black memorial patch with Gilliam's number 19 on the left sleeve of their jerseys during the 1978 World Series, and dedicated their efforts in the World Series to him. The Dodgers' archrival New York Yankees won the series in six games.

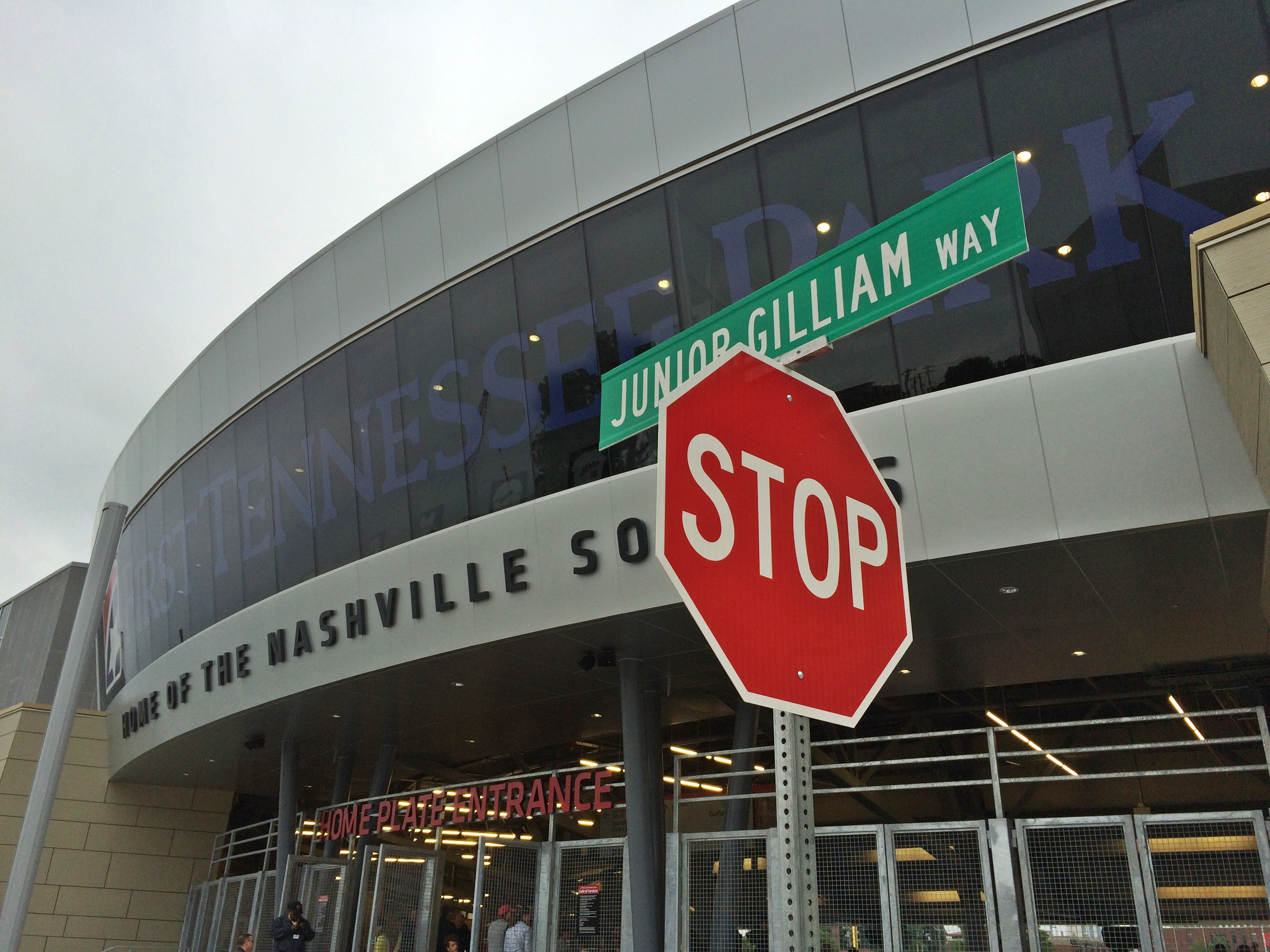
A street sign in front of First Horizon Park in Nashville, Tennessee, honoring Junior Gilliam

Gilliam was respected for his personal qualities and sportsmanship, in addition to his playing ability, over his 28-year career with the Dodgers. Quotations about him include the following:

What a great team player he was. He'd hit behind Maury, take pitch after pitch after pitch. And when Maury got to second, he'd give himself up by hitting the ball to the right side, even with two strikes, which most hitters won't do.

— teammate Jeff Torborg, describing Gilliam as the ideal #2 hitter

He didn't hit with power, he had no arm, and he couldn't run. But he did the little things to win ballgames. He never griped or complained. He was one of the most unselfish ballplayers I know.

— manager Walter Alston, Uniform is buried with Gilliam, The Baltimore Sun (October 12, 1978)

Father, friend, and locker room inspiration that will never be forgotten.

— Davey Lopes, Dodgers second baseman from 1972 to 1981

Pulitzer Prize winner and Baseball Writers Association of America Career Excellence Award winner Jim Murray of the Los Angeles Times called Gilliam his favorite all-time athlete. Soon after Gilliam's death, Murray wrote "God gave Jim Gilliam qualities that didn't show in a track meet. Patience. Determination. Discipline. Guts. ... Jim Gilliam was more a representative of baseball than any league president."

The book Carl Erskine's Tales from the Dodgers Dugout: Extra Innings (2004) includes short stories from former Dodger pitcher Carl Erskine. Gilliam is prominent in many of these stories.

In 1981, the City of Los Angeles dedicated a park in honor of Junior Gilliam's legacy. In 1984 the Jim Gilliam Park opened to the public, and is located on La Brea Avenue. The Jim Gilliam Park is marked by several facilities named after him. The first ball ceremony was thrown by the Honorable Tom Bradley, Mayor of Los Angeles (1973–1993).

On May 21, 2015, the Nashville Metro Council passed an ordinance renaming a part of Jackson Street between Second Avenue and to an alley slightly past Fifth Avenue to "Junior Gilliam Way". The center part of this stretch named for Gilliam is the location of Nashville's First Horizon Park, a minor league baseball stadium built in 2015 for the Triple-A Nashville Sounds.

In 2025, August Publications published a biography of Gilliam, Jim Gilliam: The Forgotten Dodger, by Stephen W. Dittmore.

== See also ==
- List of Negro league baseball players who played in Major League Baseball
- List of Major League Baseball career runs scored leaders
- List of Major League Baseball annual triples leaders
- List of Major League Baseball career stolen bases leaders
- List of Major League Baseball players who spent their entire career with one franchise

== Notes ==
Preceded by 1st official batting coach	Los Angeles Dodgers Hitting Coach; 1977–1978	Succeeded by Jim Lefebvre
