= Felton Snow =

American baseball player (1905–1974)

- Third base
- Born: October 23, 1905; Oxford, Alabama, U.S.
- Died: March 16, 1974 (aged 68); Louisville, Kentucky, U.S.
- Batted: Right Threw: Right

Negro league baseball debut
- 1931, for the Louisville White Sox

Last appearance
- 1947, for the Baltimore Elite Giants

Career statistics
- Batting average: .265
- Hits: 513
- Managerial record: 279–225–8
- Managerial record at Baseball Reference

Teams
- As player: Louisville White Sox/Black Caps (1931-1932); Nashville/Columbus/Washington/Baltimore Elite Giants (1933–47); Kansas City Monarchs (1943); Philadelphia Stars (1943); As manager: Baltimore Elite Giants (1939–42, 1944–47)

Career highlights and awards
- 2x East-West All Star Game (1935, 1936); Negro National League pennant (1939)

Felton "Skipper" Snow (October 23, 1905 – March 16, 1974) was an American Negro leagues professional baseball player who played for the Nashville Elite Giants that later became the Columbus Elite Giants, the Washington Elite Giants, and the Baltimore Elite Giants. Snow played on the West Squad in the East-West All-Star Games of 1935 and 1936. In 1940, he became a player-manager for the Baltimore Elite Giants.

Snow was born in Oxford, Alabama in 1905 and moved to Louisville, Kentucky as a youngster. In 1929, he began playing for different Louisville ballclubs and eventually joined Tom Wilson's Nashville Elites. Snow was known as a solid hitter, and a good fielder and baserunner. Eventually, Snow became the Elite Giants' standout third baseman. He batted .301 in 1939 and played in two Negro league All-Star games. In the 1935 All-Star game, he batted .670. His 1936 West All-Star team included such stars as Satchel Paige, Josh Gibson and Cool Papa Bell.

In 1939, he began doing double duty as player-manager of the Baltimore Elite Giants. In his first year, the Giants finished in fourth place (winning 20 games in 44 games), but the Negro National League decided to matchup them up in a four-team tournament with the Homestead Grays (36 wins in 56 games), the Newark Eagles (33 wins in 56 games), and the Philadelphia Stars (24 wins in 54 games). In the Playoffs, the Giants faced the Eagles in a best-of-five series and won three games to one to advance to the Championship Series against the Grays. They pulled off the upset in five games (one tie) to win their first and only pennant. In seven seasons as player-manager he batted .333, .227, .269, .200, .270, .245, and .306. Snow retired from baseball in 1950 with over 21 years of playing time. The Giants finished second place four more times in his tenure.

In retirement, Snow returned to Louisville and worked for the local armory. Following a work injury, he took a job at the Hubbard's Lane Barber Shop where he worked until his death in 1974 at the age of 68.

From 1987 to 2007, there was a Felton Snow baseball team in the St. Matthews, Kentucky Little League Baseball program.

He was buried in an unmarked grave, but in September 2022, he was given a graveside monument thanks to the Louisville Chapter of SABR and other donors. In conjunction with that ceremony the Louisville Bats retired his jersey number (2).
