= Cleveland Cubs =

Negro league baseball team

Information
- League: Negro National League (1931)
- Location: Cleveland, Ohio
- Ballpark: Hardware Field (1931)
- Established: 1920
- Disbanded: 1950

The Cleveland Cubs were a Negro league baseball team in the Negro National League, based in Cleveland, Ohio, in 1931. In their only season, they finished in second place with a 23-22 record. The rosters of the 1931 Cubs and the 1931 Nashville Elite Giants have some overlap as Tom Wilson was owner of both teams.

The Cubs had one Hall of Famer play for them: Satchel Paige pitched in 5 games for the Cubs, winning one and losing one, with a 2.13 ERA. The Cubs home ballpark was Hardware Field.

== Foster Memorial Giants ==
An independent Cleveland Cubs team emerged in 1932 that also went by the name "Foster Memorial Giants." Originally named Rube Foster Memorial Giants and based in Chicago, the team moved to Cleveland (and the Southern League) as a result of success of Chicago American Giants in their home city. They disappeared after playing to a 1–15 record.

This incarnation of the Cubs also had one Hall of Famer play for them: Cristóbal Torriente played in 11 games hitting .244. This Cubs team had no designated home ballpark.

== Sources ==
- Aiello, Thomas (2006). "The Fading of the Greys: Black Baseball and Historical Memory in Little Rock". The Arkansas Historical Quarterly. 65 (4). Arkansas Historical Association: 360–384. doi:10.2307/40028091. eISSN 2327-1213. ISSN 0004-1823. JSTOR 40028091.
