= Baltimore Elite Giants =

Negro league baseball team

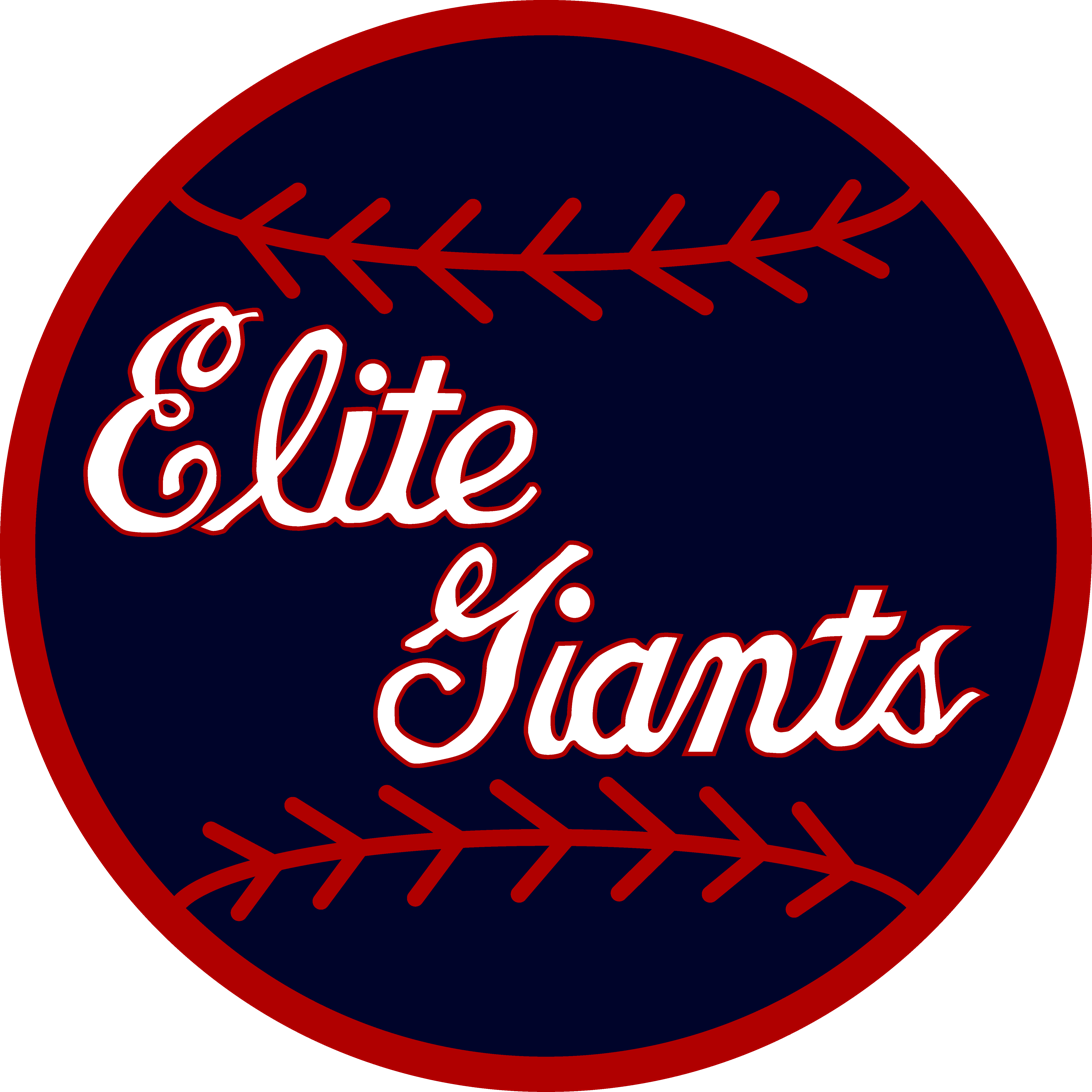
Logo
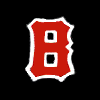
Cap insignia

Information
- League: Independent (1920–1929); Negro National League (1930); Negro Southern League (1931–1932); Negro National League (1933–1948); Negro American League (1949–1950)
- Location: Baltimore, Maryland
- Ballpark: Sulphur Dell (1920–1928); Greenwood Park (1920–1928); Tom Wilson Park (1929–1934); Red Bird Stadium (1935); Griffith Stadium (1936-1937); Bugle Field (1938–1949); Oriole Park (1938–1944); Memorial Stadium (1950); Westport Park (1950)
- Established: 1920
- Disbanded: 1950
- Nicknames: Nashville Standard Giants (1920); Nashville Elite Giants (1921–1934); Columbus Elite Giants (1935); Washington Elite Giants (1936–1937); Baltimore Elite Giants (1938–1950)
- League titles: 1939; 1949

The Baltimore Elite Giants were a professional baseball team that played in the Negro leagues from 1920 to 1950. The team was established by Thomas T. Wilson, in Nashville, Tennessee as the semi-pro Nashville Standard Giants on March 26, 1920. The team was renamed the Elite Giants in 1921, and moved to Baltimore, Maryland in 1938, where the team remained for the duration of their existence. The team and its fans pronounced the word "Elite" as "EE-light".

== Barnstorming years ==
The Nashville Standard Giants were formed as a semi-professional all-Negro team in Nashville, Tennessee, on March 26, 1920. The club was chartered by Thomas T. Wilson, T. Clay Moore, J. B. Boyd, Marshall Garrett, Walter Phillips, W. H. Pettis, J. L. Overton, and R. H. Tabor. The team's origins lie in that of two of Nashville's local negro amateur baseball teams: the Nashville Maroons (formed in 1909) and the Elites (formed in 1913). Their home games were played at Sulphur Dell and Greenwood Park, the African American community's local park. The Standard Giants welcomed any and all competition, including white-only teams, but played independently of any organized leagues until the mid-1920s.

The team was renamed the Nashville Elite Giants (pronounced EE-light) in 1921. That same year, they swept the Montgomery Grey Sox (of the minor league Negro Southern League) in a four-game championship series to win the right to declare themselves the Southern Colored Champions. They continued to play independently until joining the Negro Southern League in 1926. Nashville completed its first season in the league with a 15–15 (.500) record.

In 1929, Nashville was granted an associate membership in the Negro National League. The team finished in eighth (last) place with a 10–20 (.333) record. That same year, Wilson built a new ballpark for his team, Tom Wilson Park, which also served as a spring training site for other Negro league teams, as well as white-only minor league teams, such as the Southern Association's Nashville Vols. Babe Ruth, Lou Gehrig, and Roy Campanella are known to have played at the park. The 8,000 (or 4,000) seat facility featured a single-decked, covered grandstand. The ballpark was centrally located in Nashville's largest black community, known as Trimble Bottom, near the convergence of Second and Forth Avenues, just north of the fairgrounds.

== Negro league years ==
=== National League ===
In 1930, the team gained admission into their first organized league, the Negro National League. The Elite Giants finished in seventh place with a 39–47 record.

=== Southern League ===
The Elite Giants joined the Negro Southern League, where they played in 1931 and 1932.

=== Second National League ===
A second incarnation of the Negro National League was formed in 1933, where the Elite Giants played for the following two seasons. Nashville finished the 1933 season in fifth place with a 29–22 record and tied as winners of the second half of the season with the Pittsburgh Crawfords. Nashville lost a three-game playoff with Pittsburgh for a spot in the league championship game. In 1934, the Elite Giants finished in fourth place with a 20–28 record.

In 1935, the team moved to Columbus, Ohio and became the Columbus Elite Giants. They played only one season in Columbus, 1935, finishing in fourth place with a 16–17 record.

In 1936 the team moved to Washington, D.C. and became the Washington Elite Giants. In their first season, they finished in fifth place with a 21–24 record. In 1937, the Elites finished in third place with a 27–17 record.

The team moved again in 1938 to Baltimore, Maryland and became the Baltimore Elite Giants. In 1939, the Elites won the Negro National Title, defeating the Homestead Grays. In 1948, they won the first half, but lost the championship to second half winners, the Homestead Grays.

=== American League ===
In 1949, the Negro National League ceased operations, and the Elite Giants joined the Negro American League. In their first season with the new league, Baltimore captured the Eastern and Western Division titles, earning them a second Negro National Title. In thirteen seasons in Baltimore, of the eleven which have available standings, the Elite Giants finished in the top three during nine of those seasons. In dire financial straits, the club played one final season in 1950 before dissolving.

== Baseball Hall of Fame inductees ==
These Baltimore Elite Giants alumni have been inducted to the National Baseball Hall of Fame and Museum.

Baltimore Elite Giants Hall of Famers
Inductee	Position	Tenure	Inducted
Roy Campanella	C	1937–1945	1969
Ray Dandridge	3B / 2B / SS	1933	1987
Leon Day	P	1949	1995
Biz Mackey	C / SS / 1B	1936–1939	2006
Willie Wells	SS / 3B	1946	1997

A number of future major leaguers wore the uniform of the Elite Giants, including Hall of Famers Roy Campanella and Leon Day (who played in with the team in the non-major league years of 1949-50). Also a member of the Elite Giants were two future National League Rookie of the Years in Junior Gilliam (1953) and Joe Black (1952), each who played with Campanella for the Brooklyn Dodgers. The Elite Giants also added the first known professional baseball player of Cape Verdean descent, Joe Campini, to their roster in 1948.

== Championships ==
The Elite Giants won four Negro Southern League pennants while based in Nashville. The NSL was considered a minor league during those years. After relocation to Baltimore, the Elite Giants won a major Negro league pennant in the Negro National League four team playoff; the fourth place Giants beat the 2nd place Eagles and the first place Grays to win the pennant. After integration, the Giants won a pennant in the Negro American League.

Season	Manager	Record	Postseason
1921		72–46 (1st place)	Won NSL playoff (Montgomery Grey Sox^{2nd place}) 4–1
1922		47–24 (1st place)	Won pennant outright
1929		9–3 (1st place)	Won pennant outright
1931		22–11 (1st place)	'Won pennant outright
Total Negro Southern League pennants			4
1939	Felton Snow	22–25 (4th place)	2nd round: 3–1–1 over 1st place Homestead Grays; 1st round: 3–1 over 2nd place Newark Eagles
Total Negro National League pennants			1
1949	Hoss Walker	59–30 (1st place, East Division)	Won NAL playoff (Homestead Grays^{West Division}) ?–?
Total Negro American League pennants			1
