= Jacksonville Red Caps all-time roster =

The following is the list of players on the Jacksonville Red Caps all-time roster. These are Jacksonville Red Caps players who appeared in at least one game for the Red Caps in 1938 or from 1941 to 1942, or the Cleveland Bears from 1939 to 1940.

On-going research continuously discovers unreported or misreported games (and the affected players), while some games and players may be lost forever. Therefore, some Negro league players' affiliations will likely remain incomplete and possibly disputed.

‡ Bold player inducted as a member of the National Baseball Hall of Fame and Museum.

== A–L ==
Player	Year(s)	Position(s)	Ref
Hosea Allen	1941–1942	P	
Ted Alexander	1940	P	
Jabbo Andrews	1942	RF	
Herb Barnhill	1937–1938, 1940–1942	C	
Alonzo Boone	1939–1940	P	
Lefty Boone	1942	P	
George Britt	1941–1942	C	
Alex Broome	1940–1942	P	
Jack Bruton	1939	OF	
Walter Burch	1939	C	
Jim Canada	1942	1B	
Duke Cleveland	1938–1942, 1944	OF	
Ralph Coles	1939–1941	OF	
James Cooper	1942	P	
Alphonso Cox	1938	P	
Spencer Davis	1938	2B	
[William Dyke	1942	2B	
Specs Ellis	1937, 1940–1942, 1944	P	
Felix Evans	1938	P / OF	
Gerves Fagan	1942	3B	
Bernard Fernandez	1939	P	
Willie Ferrell	1938–1939	P	
Albert Frazier	1937–1940, 1944	2B / 3B	
Charlie Harris	1944	2B	
Preacher Henry	1937–1942	P	
Leroy Holmes	1937–1939	SS	
Herman Howard	1938–1939	P	
Mint Jones	1937–1941	1B	
Gabby Kemp	1938, 1940–1941	2B	
Clarence Lamar	1938–1942, 1944	SS	

== M–Z ==
Player	Year(s)	Position(s)	Ref
Felix McLaurin	1942	OF	
Jack McLaurin	1944	OF	
Alonzo Mitchell	1937–1941, 1944	P	
Willie Nixon	1941	OF	
Smoky Owens	1938–1940	P	
Sylvester Owens	1942	OF	
Don Pelham	1937	OF	
Johnny Ray	1939–1942	OF	
Walter Robinson	1937–1938, 1940–1942, 1944	2B	
Joe Royal	1937–1939, 1942, 1944	OF	
Leo Sanders	1942	SS	
Andy Sarvis	1939–1942	P	
Robert Scott	1941	1B	
Gene Smith	1941–1942	3B	
Henry Smith	1942	2B	
Dan Thomas	1939	OF	
Lacey Thomas	1937–1938, 1940, 1944	OF	
Henry Turner	1937–1942	C	
Eugene Tyler	1939	OF	
Clarence White	1940	P	
Jim Williams	1940, 1944	OF	
Parnell Woods	1939–1942	3B	
