= Atlanta Black Crackers all-time roster =

The following is the list of players on the Atlanta Black Crackers all-time roster. These are Atlanta Black Crackers players who appeared in at least one game for the Black Crackers from 1919 to 1938, or the Indianapolis ABCs in 1939.

On-going research continuously discovers unreported or misreported games (and the affected players), while some games and players may be lost forever. Therefore, some Negro league players' affiliations will likely remain incomplete and possibly disputed.

‡ Bold player inducted as a member of the National Baseball Hall of Fame and Museum.

== A–K ==
Player	Year(s)	Position(s)	Ref
Hipolito Arenas	1927–1928, 1932	OF	
Raymond Austin	1932	P	
Herb Barnhill	1936		
Cannonball Berry	1938	P	
Oscar Boone	1939	C	
Bo Briggery	1932	SS	
Ping Burke	1937	P	
Pee Wee Butts	1938	SS	
Jim Canada	1938		
Marlin Carter	1938	2B	
Jim Colzie	1938–1939		
Bill Cooper	1937–1938	C	
Alex Crumbley	1938	OF	
Babe Davis	1937–1939	OF	
Spencer Davis	1938–1939	3B	
Eddie Dixon	1938–1939	P	
Charles Dunklin	1938	P	
Felix Evans	1935–1936, 1938–1939	P	
Bernard Fernandez	1938–1939		
Benny Fields	1938	3B	
Hap Glenn	1937–1938	3B	
Joe Greene	1932–1938	C	
Red Hadley	1937–1939	OF	
Roy Harding	1938	P	
Sammy Haynes	1938–1939		
Jonathan Hill	1937	OF	
Flit Holliday	1938	OF	
Herman Howard	1938	P	
Telosh Howard	1932, 1937–1938	P	
Bozo Jackson	1938	SS / 2B	
Jasper Jones	1932	OF	
Gabby Kemp	1937–1939	2B	

== L–Z ==
Player	Year(s)	Position(s)	Ref
Horatio Lamar	1939	2B	
Emory Long	1932	3B	
John McFarlin	1932	1B	
Bub Miller	1938	3B	
Alonzo Mitchell	1938–1939		
Bo Mitchell	1938	P	
Tee Mitchell	1939	P	
James Moore	1933–1935, 1938–1939	1B	
Lefty Nelson	1937	P	
Don Pelham	1937–1938	OF	
Lamar Potter	1932	P	
Jimmy Reese	1937–1938	P	
Donald Reeves	1937–1939	OF	
Ambrose Reid	1932	OF	
Ormond Sampson	1932, 1937	SS	
Jimmy Shamberger	1938	3B	
Leo Sims	1938	SS	
Gene Smith	1938		
Guy Smith	1939	P	
Jack Thornton	1932, 1937	1B	
Cristóbal Torriente‡	1932		
Roy Welmaker	1932, 1936–1937	P	
Nish Williams	1938–1939	C	
James Winston	1932	OF	
Geech Yarborough	1932	C	
