= Joseph Royal (disambiguation) =

Joseph Royal may refer to:

- Joseph Royal (1837–1902), Canadian politician, business and journalist
- Joe Royal (baseball) (1912–1975), American baseball player
- Joey Royal, Canadian Anglican bishop
- Joe Royal (rugby union) (born 1985), New Zealand rugby player

== See also ==
- Joe Royal (disambiguation)
