= Red Moore =

Red Moore may refer to:

- James "Red" Moore (baseball) (1916–2016), American Negro league baseball player
- William R. "Red" Moore (American football) (1922–2011), American football player and coach
