= Clarence White (disambiguation) =

Clarence White (1944–1973) was an American guitarist.

Clarence White may also refer to:

- Clarence Cameron White (1880–1960), American composer
- Clarence Hudson White (1871–1925), American photographer
- Clarence White (baseball) (1901–?), American baseball player
- Clarrie White (Clarence Alfred Eric White, 1914–1991), Australian rules footballer
