= Walter Robinson =

Walter Robinson may refer to:

- Walter Robinson (cricketer) (1851–1919), English cricketer
- Walter George Robinson (1873–1949), Canadian insurance and loan agent and political figure in Saskatchewan
- Walter G. Robinson (1879–1940), engineer, businessman, and National Guard officer from New York
- Walter Robinson (baseball) (born 1908), American Negro leagues baseball player
- Walter Robinson (bishop) (1919–1975), Anglican Bishop of Dunedin
- Walter V. Robinson (born 1946), American journalist and journalism professor
- Walter Robinson (artist) (1950–2025), American art critic and artist
- Walter Robinson (composer), African American composer
- Walter Allen Robinson (1839–1895), British administrator and principal of Aitchison College, Lahore
- Newt Robinson (Walter Robinson), American baseball player
