= Larry Mitchell =

Larry or Lawrence Mitchell may refer to:

- Larry Mitchell (author) (1939–2012), American author and publisher
- Larry Mitchell (ice hockey) (born 1967), Canadian-German ice hockey coach
- Larry Mitchell (baseball) (born 1971), pitcher in Major League Baseball
- Lawrence "Boo" Mitchell, American musician
- Tee Mitchell (Lawrence Berry Mitchell, 1916–1970), American baseball player
- John Mitchell Jr. (politician) (born 1954), known as Larry, American politician
