= Leroy Holmes =

Leroy Holmes may refer to:

- LeRoy Holmes (1913–1986), American songwriter, composer and record producer
- Leroy Holmes (baseball) (1914–1964), American Negro league shortstop
