= Sylvester Owens =

American baseball player

- Outfielder

Negro league baseball debut
- 1937, for the Birmingham Black Barons

Last appearance
- 1942, for the Jacksonville Red Caps

Teams
- Birmingham Black Barons (1937–1938); Indianapolis ABCs (1939); St. Louis–New Orleans Stars (1939–1940); Indianapolis Crawfords (1940); Philadelphia Stars (1941); Jacksonville Red Caps (1942)

Sylvester Owens was an American Negro league baseball outfielder in the 1930s and 1940s.

Owens made his Negro leagues debut in 1937 with the Birmingham Black Barons. He went on to play with several teams, including the St. Louis–New Orleans Stars and Philadelphia Stars, and finished his career in 1942 with the Jacksonville Red Caps.
