= Jack Thornton (baseball) =

American baseball player (1909–2002)

- First baseman
- Born: November 29, 1909; Athens, Georgia
- Died: November 4, 2002 (aged 92); Chicago, Illinois
- Batted: Right Threw: Right

Negro league baseball debut
- 1932, for the Atlanta Black Crackers

Last appearance
- 1937, for the Atlanta Black Crackers

Teams
- Atlanta Black Crackers (1932, 1937)

Roy Jack Thornton (November 29, 1909 – November 4, 2002), born "Roy Lee Thornton", was an American Negro league first baseman in the 1930s.

A native of Athens, Georgia, Thornton attended Morris Brown College and Atlanta University. He played for the Atlanta Black Crackers in 1932 and again in 1937. Thornton died in Chicago, Illinois in 2002 at age 92.
