= Red Hadley =

American baseball player (1909–1974)

- Outfielder
- Born: March 28, 1909; Thomasville, Georgia, U.S.
- Died: November 1, 1974 (aged 65); Atlanta, Georgia, U.S.
- Batted: Left Threw: Right

Negro league baseball debut
- 1937, for the Atlanta Black Crackers

Last appearance
- 1939, for the Indianapolis ABCs
- Stats at Baseball Reference

Teams
- Atlanta Black Crackers (1937–1938); Indianapolis ABCs (1939)

Henry Thomas "Red" Hadley (March 28, 1909 – November 1, 1974) was an American Negro league outfielder in the 1930s.

A native of Thomasville, Georgia, Hadley played college football for Morris Brown College, where he once returned a punt 75 yards for a touchdown. Hadley made his Negro leagues debut in 1937 with the Atlanta Black Crackers, and played for three seasons with the club, which became known as the "Indianapolis ABCs" in 1939. He died in Atlanta, Georgia in 1974 at age 65.
