= Charlie Harris (second baseman) =

American baseball player

- Second baseman

Negro league baseball debut
- 1943, for the Cincinnati Clowns

Last appearance
- 1944, for the Jacksonville Red Caps
- Stats at Baseball Reference

Teams
- Cincinnati Clowns (1943); Chicago American Giants (1943); Jacksonville Red Caps (1944)

Charlie Harris was an American Negro league baseball second baseman who played in the 1940s.

Harris made his Negro leagues debut in 1943 with the Cincinnati Clowns and Chicago American Giants. The following season, he played for the Jacksonville Red Caps.
