= Specs Ellis =

American baseball player

- Pitcher
- Threw: Left

Negro league baseball debut
- 1937, for the Jacksonville Red Caps

Last appearance
- 1944, for the Birmingham Black Barons
- Stats at Baseball Reference

Teams
- Jacksonville Red Caps/Cleveland Bears (1937, 1940–1942); Birmingham Black Barons (1942); Cincinnati Clowns (1943); Jacksonville Red Caps (1944); Birmingham Black Barons (1944)

Specs Ellis was an American Negro league baseball pitcher who played in the 1930s and 1940s.

Ellis made his debut in 1937 with the Jacksonville Red Caps. He spent several seasons with the club, and also played for the Birmingham Black Barons and Cincinnati Clowns.
