= Leo Sims =

American baseball player

- Infielder

Negro league baseball debut
- 1938, for the Birmingham Black Barons

Last appearance
- 1938, for the Atlanta Black Crackers
- Stats at Baseball Reference

Teams
- Birmingham Black Barons (1938); Atlanta Black Crackers (1938)

Leo Sims is an American former Negro league infielder who played in the 1930s.

Sims played for the Birmingham Black Barons and Atlanta Black Crackers in 1938. In 11 recorded games, he posted eight hits in 43 plate appearances.
