= Mint Jones =

American baseball player (1910–1962)

- First baseman
- Born: December 10, 1910; Tampa, Florida, US
- Died: October 1962; Jacksonville, Florida, US
- Batted: Both Threw: Right

Negro league baseball debut
- 1937, for the Jacksonville Red Caps

Last appearance
- 1941, for the Jacksonville Red Caps
- Stats at Baseball Reference

Teams
- Jacksonville Red Caps (1937–1938); Cleveland Bears (1939–1940); Jacksonville Red Caps (1941)

Ernest Mint Jones (December 10, 1910 – October 1962) was an American Negro league first baseman who played between 1937 and 1941.

A native of Tampa, Florida, Jones made his Negro leagues debut in 1937 with the Jacksonville Red Caps. He remained with the club through 1941, as it moved to Cleveland in 1939, and then back to Jacksonville in 1941.
