= José Bautista =

Dominican baseball player (born 1980)

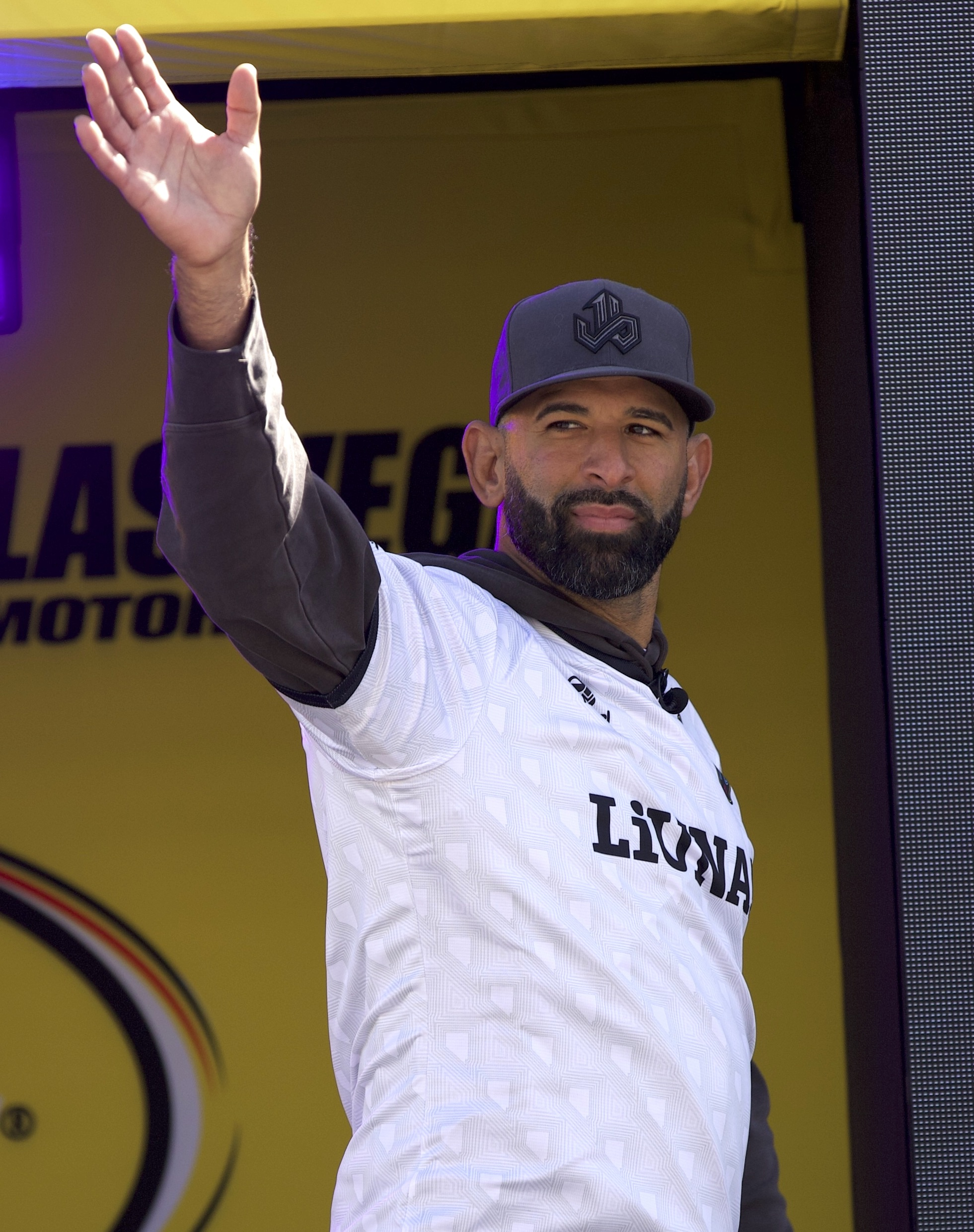
- Bautista at Las Vegas Motor Speedway in 2024
- Right fielder / Third baseman
- Born: October 19, 1980 (age 46); Santo Domingo, Dominican Republic
- Batted: Right Threw: Right

MLB debut
- April 4, 2004, for the Baltimore Orioles

Last MLB appearance
- September 30, 2018, for the Philadelphia Phillies

MLB statistics
- Batting average: .247
- Home runs: 344
- Runs batted in: 975
- Stats at Baseball Reference

Teams
- Baltimore Orioles (2004); Tampa Bay Devil Rays (2004); Kansas City Royals (2004); Pittsburgh Pirates (2004–2008); Toronto Blue Jays (2008–2017); Atlanta Braves (2018); New York Mets (2018); Philadelphia Phillies (2018)

Career highlights and awards
- 6× All-Star (2010–2015); 3× Silver Slugger Award (2010, 2011, 2014); 2× AL Hank Aaron Award (2010, 2011); 2× MLB home run leader (2010, 2011); Toronto Blue Jays Hall of Excellence

Member of the Canadian

Baseball Hall of Fame
- Induction: 2025
Medals
Men's baseball
Representing Dominican Republic
Olympic Games
Bronze medal – third place	2020 Tokyo	Team

José Antonio Bautista Santos (born October 19, 1980), nicknamed "Joey Bats", is a Dominican former professional baseball right fielder and third baseman who played 15 seasons in Major League Baseball (MLB), primarily for the Toronto Blue Jays. Bautista also played for the Baltimore Orioles, Tampa Bay Devil Rays, Kansas City Royals, Pittsburgh Pirates, Atlanta Braves, New York Mets, and Philadelphia Phillies.

The Pirates selected Bautista in the 20th round of the 2000 MLB draft. He played for four clubs, primarily at third base, before joining the Blue Jays in 2008. In 2010, he became the 26th member of the 50 home run club, while leading MLB in home runs for the first of two consecutive seasons. From 2010–2015, Bautista hit more home runs than any player in the major leagues. He was an MLB All-Star six consecutive times and won three Silver Slugger Awards and two Hank Aaron Awards. He was named the American League (AL) Player of the Month five times and AL Player of the Week four times. Bautista was voted in the top ten in the AL Most Valuable Player Award four times.

Major league scouts took note of Bautista, including his power hitting potential and strong throwing arm, while he was in junior college. In 2004, he made his MLB debut with the Orioles and became the first player to appear on five MLB rosters in one season. He ended the season with the Pirates, where he would remain for four-plus seasons, seeing time as a utility player who played six positions, including designated hitter (DH).

Bautista was traded to the Blue Jays in August 2008. After making adjustments to his swing, he broke through with ten home runs in September 2009. From 2010 to 2017, Bautista hit at least 20 home runs each year, and in four of those seasons, hit at least 35 home runs, both scored and drove in at least 100 runs, and drew at least 100 bases on balls, including twice leading the AL. In 2015, while playing in the playoffs for the first time, his bat flip in the American League Division Series (ALDS) caused a sensation that became a symbol of Toronto's first playoff appearance in 22 years. He is a leader or among the top ten in numerous offensive single-season and career categories for the Blue Jays.

In 2011, Bautista set up a program that helps athletes from the Dominican Republic to attend universities in the United States.

In 2024, he became the owner of Las Vegas Lights FC.

== Early life ==
Coming from a middle class family in the Dominican Republic that placed great importance on education, Bautista began studying English at age eight. His mother was an accountant and financial planner, and his father, who had earned a master's degree in agricultural engineering in Hungary, ran poultry farms. Bautista attended a private high school, De La Salle High School, in Santo Domingo. He was aided by the Latin Athletes Education Fund, designed for players from Spanish-speaking countries aspiring to play college baseball in the United States. Although he invested much time in pursuing professional baseball, Bautista studied business at Mother and Teacher Pontifical Catholic University in the event a career in baseball did not materialize.

After working out with various Major League Baseball (MLB) clubs, he turned down offers of $5,000 from the New York Yankees and $42,000 from the Arizona Diamondbacks. The Cincinnati Reds offered him $300,000, which Bautista accepted; however, before the contract could become official, the team changed ownership and subsequently rescinded the offer. Bautista then created a highlight tape of himself using a camcorder and sent it to various colleges in the United States. There was no response until he received a call from Oscar Pérez, whom he had known from the Quique Cruz League in the Dominican Republic. Pérez informed him of the Latin Athletes Education Fund. He connected Bautista with Don Odermann, a businessman in the San Francisco Bay Area. Odermann, who assisted baseball players from Latin America desiring to play baseball in the US, knew that Chipola College, a junior college in Marianna, Florida, was seeking an everyday player. There, Bautista played for two years until being drafted.

== Professional career ==
=== Early career ===
The Pittsburgh Pirates drafted Bautista in the 20th round (599th overall) of the 2000 Major League Baseball draft. He signed with the Pirates for a $500,000 signing bonus. Bautista played for the Williamsport Crosscutters of the Class A Short Season New York–Penn League in 2001 and the Hickory Crawdads of the Class A South Atlantic League in 2002. In 2003, he played for the Lynchburg Hillcats of the Class A-Advanced Carolina League.

After the 2003 season, the Baltimore Orioles selected Bautista in the Rule 5 draft and carried him on their Opening Day roster. He made his MLB debut with Baltimore on April 4, 2004. After playing 16 games with the Orioles, the Tampa Bay Devil Rays claimed him off waivers on June 3. Twenty-five days later, the Kansas City Royals purchased him from Tampa Bay after a 12-game stint with the Devil Rays. He played 13 games for the Royals before they traded him to the New York Mets on July 30 for Justin Huber, who then traded him minutes later to the Pittsburgh Pirates with Ty Wigginton and minor leaguer Matt Peterson for Kris Benson and Jeff Keppinger. Bautista tied the Major League rookie record for the most teams played for in a single season, appearing in at least one game for four different clubs (Note: The other players to do this are Frank Huelsman in 1904, Charles Zomphier in 1927, Alex Crumbley in 1938, and Gerves Fagan in 1943.).

Bautista played in 11 games for the Pirates in 2005. In 2006, his first full season in the major leagues, Bautista hit .235 with 16 home runs (HR) and 51 runs batted in (RBI). The following season in 2007, he posted similar numbers in 142 games, finishing the season with a batting average of .254, 15 home runs and 63 RBI. That same year, he became the starting third baseman for the Pirates. He took over for reigning National League batting champion Freddy Sanchez, who moved to second base.

Bautista was to be the Pirates' starting third baseman and backup outfielder in 2008. From June 14–24, he hit five home runs in a span of nine games against interleague opponents Baltimore Orioles, Chicago White Sox, Toronto Blue Jays, and the New York Yankees. However, he struggled offensively for most of the year, and after the 2008 trade deadline Bautista lost his starting job to the newly acquired Andy LaRoche. Bautista was optioned to the Triple-A Indianapolis Indians on August 13.

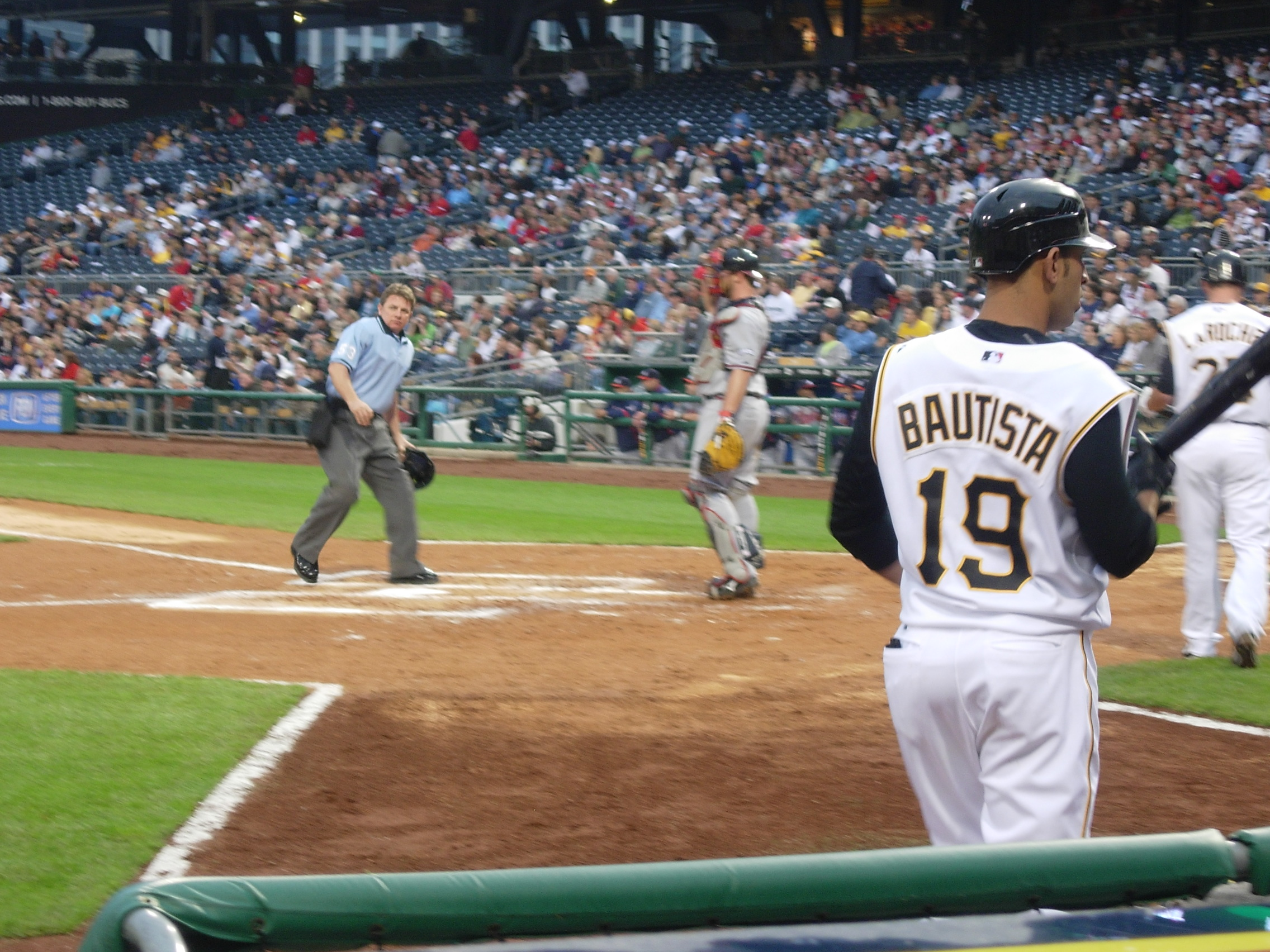
Bautista with the Pirates in 2008

=== Toronto Blue Jays ===
==== 2008 ====
On August 21, 2008, the Pirates traded Bautista to the Blue Jays for a player to be named later, who eventually was Robinzon Díaz. The Blue Jays needed a third baseman due to an injury to Scott Rolen. Bautista batted .214 with three home runs and 10 RBI in 21 games for Toronto after the trade.

==== 2009 ====
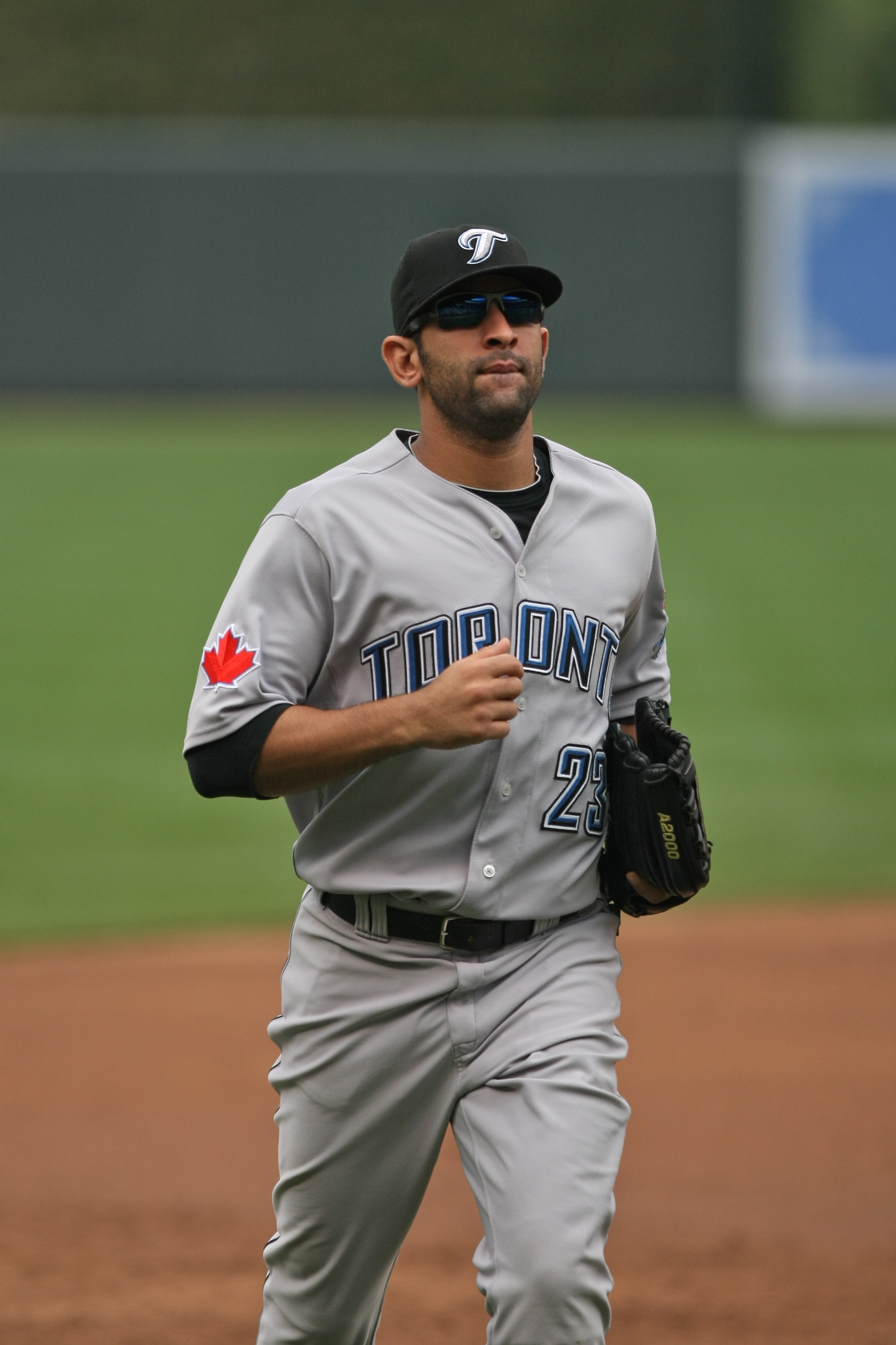
Bautista with the Toronto Blue Jays in 2009

Starting the 2009 season on the bench, manager Cito Gaston assigned Bautista to back up Rolen and outfielders Alex Ríos and Adam Lind. Bautista started the season with a .317 batting average, .404 on-base percentage (OBP) and .463 slugging percentage (SLG) in 49 plate appearances in April. However, his numbers fell off, as he batted between .167 and .231 each month from May through August with two total home runs. At times he showed marked plate discipline; in the month of May, he walked 14 times for a .403 OBP despite batting just .231. Eventually, the Chicago White Sox claimed Rios off waivers, the Blue Jays assigned Lind to the role of designated hitter, and an injury to Marco Scutaro led to an increase in Bautista's playing time and making him the leadoff hitter.

As the season drew to a close, the Blue Jays made changes to their coaching staff. One was to move first base coach Dwayne Murphy to replace the retiring Gene Tenace as hitting coach. Formerly a Blue Jays' minor league roving hitting instructor and hitting coach, Murphy had already spent nearly one year working with Bautista, teaching him to leverage his pull power by starting his swing with his now-familiar high leg kick. In September and October, he finally broke through, hitting 10 home runs with 21 RBI, a .257 batting average and a .606 slugging percentage (SLG). He hit 13 total home runs in 2009 with 40 RBI, a batting average of .235, and 79 hits in 113 games. Originally considered to be a non-tender candidate, he re-signed with the Blue Jays on a one-year, $2.4 million US contract for the 2010 season.

==== 2010 ====
Bautista began the 2010 campaign as the starting right fielder and leadoff hitter. On May 17, he was named AL Player of the Week after hitting .444 (8-for-18) with 20 total bases, 4 home runs, 8 RBI, 8 runs scored, a .565 OBP, and an MLB-best 1.111 SLG. Bautista hit his 20th home run as part of a two-home run night against the St. Louis Cardinals on June 22, setting a new career high for a single season in just two months.

Bautista was selected as a reserve for the 2010 Major League Baseball All-Star Game. Bautista entered the game as a pinch runner for Josh Hamilton and finished the game 0-for-1.

For the month of July, Bautista batted .347, with 11 home runs, 29 RBI, and an AL-leading .765 slugging percentage, sharing American League Player of the Month honors with Twins outfielder Delmon Young. Bautista was also named Blue Jays' Player of the Month, which is selected through voting by the Toronto chapter of the Baseball Writers' Association of America (BBWAA). With his 12 home runs in May and 11 in July, Bautista became the third Blue Jay player in franchise history to have two months with at least 10 home runs.

Bautista was named co-winner of the American League Player of the Week award for the period ending August 1. He hit .545 with five homers and 13 RBI during that span. On August 26, Bautista hit his 100th career home run against the Detroit Tigers. Bautista was again named player of the week for the week ending August 29; in seven games that week, Bautista led the American League with a .500 batting average (10-for-20) and hit four home runs. Bautista became the only Blue Jays player to win the award three times in one season. Bautista won AL Player of the Month for the month of August, in which he hit he led the AL in home runs (12), RBI (24), slugging percentage (.724) and total bases (72), while tying for the lead in extra-base hits (18). He finished tied for second with 23 runs and was third with 23 walks. He also won the Honda Player of the Month Award, his second such award in as many months.

On September 17, Bautista set the new Blue Jays single-season home run record with his 48th home run, breaking the record set by George Bell. On September 23, Bautista became the 26th player in MLB history to reach the 50 home run club in one season, and the first Blue Jays player to do so. His 52nd home run set a new MLB record for the largest single-season increase in home runs, eclipsing Davey Johnson's 38 home run increase from 1972 to 1973. Bautista finished the 2010 season with an MLB-leading 54 home runs, the highest total since Alex Rodriguez hit 54 in 2007. Bautista won the AL Hank Aaron Award and a Silver Slugger Award, awards for his offensive performance, and finished fourth in the AL Most Valuable Player Award (MVP) voting, behind Hamilton, Miguel Cabrera and Robinson Canó. The Toronto chapter of the BBWAA named Bautista the Blue Jays' Most Valuable Player, the Blue Jays' Most Improved Player, and presented him the John Cerutti Award for displaying "goodwill, cooperation and character".

==== 2011 ====
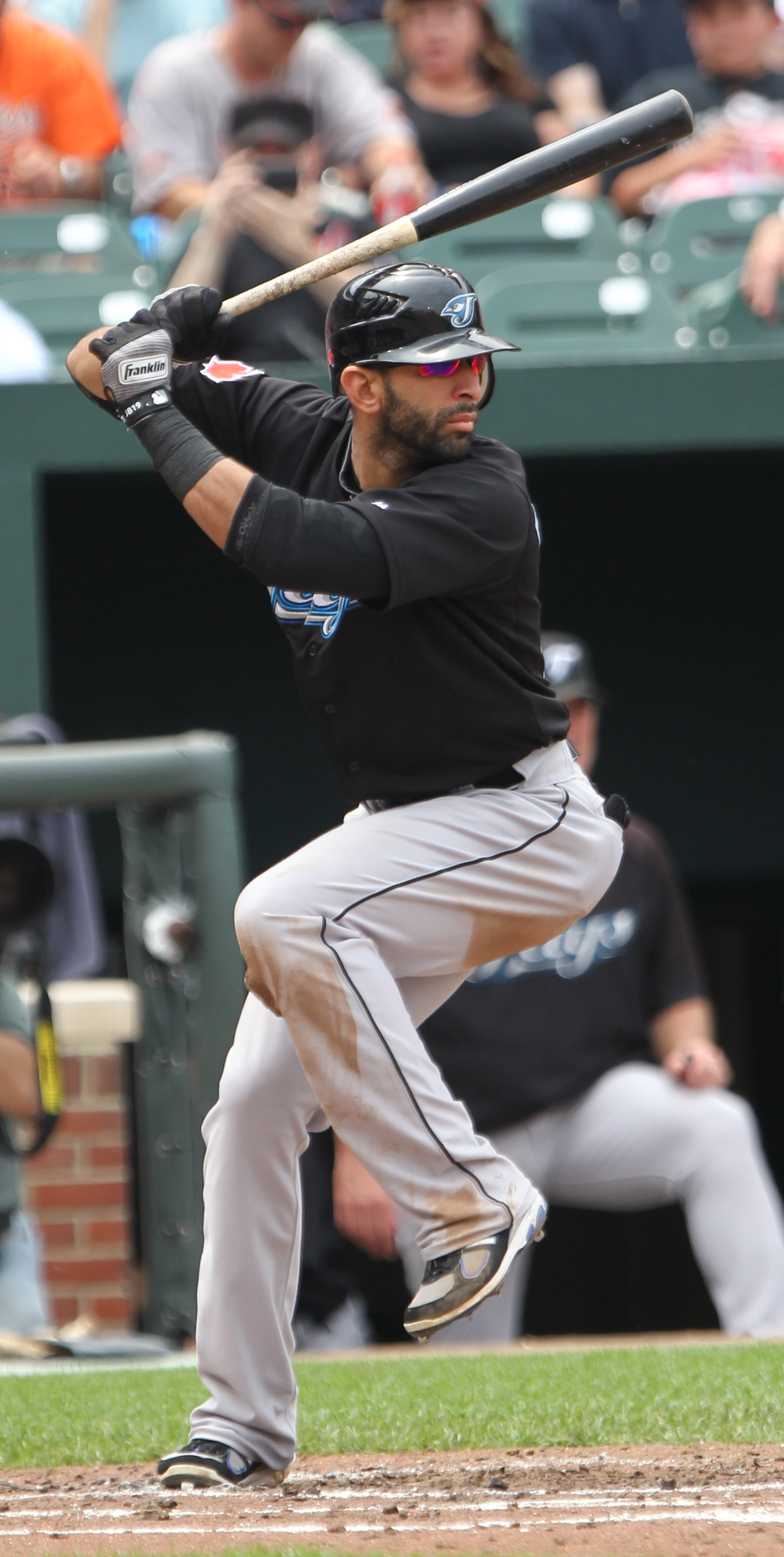
Bautista batting for Toronto in 2011

Bautista agreed to a five-year contract extension worth $64 million before the 2011 season. He began the season as the starting right fielder for the Blue Jays, with Edwin Encarnación playing third base. Bautista walked 28 times in the month of April, breaking a club record that was set when Carlos Delgado collected 26 bases on balls in April 2001. Bautista was unanimously selected for the Blue Jays' Player of the Month award, and was also named the AL Player of the Month for the month of April (his third such award in four months, dating back to the 2010 season).

On May 15, Bautista hit three home runs against the Minnesota Twins, the first three-home run game of his career. On May 28, in a home game against the Chicago White Sox, Bautista hit his 20th home run, a three-run shot to left field, becoming the first player to reach 20 home runs in 2011 as well as the fastest player to reach 20 home runs (44 games) in Blue Jays franchise history. Bautista won the AL Player of the Month award for May, his fourth such award in five months. He also became the first player to have the highest number of home runs in a single month for five consecutive months since Jimmie Foxx did so from June 1933 to April 1934. Bautista also won the Blue Jays' Player of the Month award for the second consecutive month. On June 23, the Blue Jays shifted Bautista to third base and recalled Eric Thames to play the outfield.

Bautista was selected for the 2011 MLB All-Star Game, receiving a record 7,454,753 votes. At the time of his selection, he led MLB in home runs (26), walks (70), OBP (.471), slugging percentage (.679), OPS (1.150), times on base (160) and was also in second place for runs scored (64), total bases (182) and extra base hits (41). He became the first Blue Jay in history to lead the league in All-Star voting. He was also the first Blue Jay to be voted into the All-Star game as a starter since Carlos Delgado in 2003. Bautista participated in the Home Run Derby; he hit four home runs and was eliminated in the first round.

On August 5, with the debut of prospect Brett Lawrie to play third base, Bautista returned to right field. In a game against the Oakland Athletics on August 20, Bautista walked three times, which brought his season total to 102 walks in 113 games, the fastest a player reached 100 walks since Barry Bonds in 2007. During a game against the New York Yankees on September 5, Bautista hit his 40th home run of the season, a solo homer off reliever Rafael Soriano. He became the second player in franchise history with back-to-back 40 home run seasons. Two games later on September 7, against the Boston Red Sox, Bautista stole home plate on a double steal in which Lawrie took second base, becoming the first 40 home run hitter to steal home plate since Adam Dunn in 2004.

After leading the major leagues in home runs for the second consecutive season with 43, Bautista became the first player to do so since Mark McGwire in 1998 and 1999. Bautista also led the majors in slugging percentage (.608), OPS (1.056) and walks (132) and the AL in intentional walks (24). He placed second in OBP (.447) behind Cabrera. He batted .302 and also placed in the top ten in the league in runs scored (105), total bases (312) and times on base (293). Defensively, he led AL right fielders with five double plays turned and placed fourth in assists with 13 and fifth with six errors. His walk total was the highest in the league since Jason Giambi collected 137 in 2000, while setting a new Blue Jays franchise record, which Delgado previously held with 123, also in 2000. He also set new Blue Jays' single-season records with 8.1 total Wins Above Replacement (WAR) and 8.3 offensive WAR according to Baseball Reference, edging John Olerud's 7.7 total in 1993, and Delgado's 8.1 offensive WAR in 2000. Bautista held the record for total WAR until Josh Donaldson rated at 8.8 in 2015; however, as of 2015, Bautista still holds the record for offensive WAR. He was the American League winner of the Hank Aaron Award for the second consecutive season, becoming just the third player in the award's history, after Rodriguez and Barry Bonds, to win the award in back-to-back years. Bautista also received his second consecutive Silver Slugger Award.

==== 2012 ====
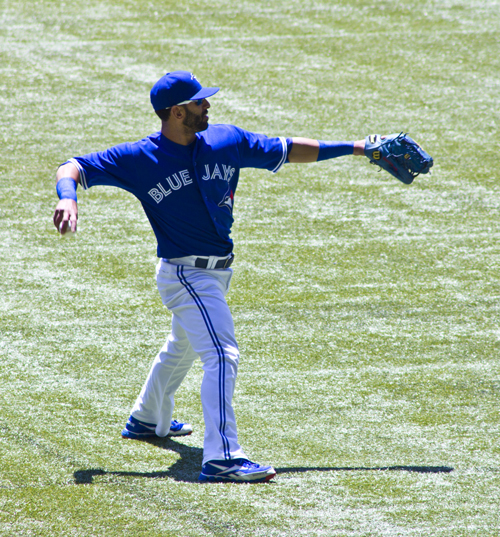
Bautista with the Blue Jays in 2012

On January 30, 2012, Bautista was announced as the cover athlete for the Canadian edition of MLB 12: The Show. In an interleague game against the Milwaukee Brewers on June 19, Bautista hit the second of three straight solo home runs by the Blue Jays, between Colby Rasmus and Edwin Encarnación, the first time since 2005 that the Jays went back-to-back-to-back with home runs. Bautista also took over the MLB lead in home runs for 2012, hitting his 25th on June 27 against the Boston Red Sox, which broke the Blue Jays club record for home runs in a month, with 13. He went on to finish the month with 14 home runs, one short of the American League record for June.

Bautista was voted an American League starter in the All-Star Game for the second consecutive year and his third overall All-Star selection. Hamilton surpassed Bautista's record vote total of the prior year. On July 2, Bautista was named American League Player of the Month for June. It was his fifth time receiving the honor in his career. He batted .274 with 14 home runs and 30 RBI in the month of June. His 14 home runs in June set a new Blue Jays franchise record for home runs in a month. Bautista competed in the Home Run Derby. At the time of his selection, he led all major league players with 26 home runs. Bautista finished second to Prince Fielder.

Bautista was placed on the 15-day disabled list on July 17 with inflammation in his wrist. He had started in all previous 90 games, and the Blue Jays called up prospect Anthony Gose to take his place after the game. Bautista was activated on August 24, but returned to the DL on August 26 after he re-aggravated the injury to his left wrist. On August 28, the Jays announced that he would undergo season-ending surgery on the wrist. In 2012, Bautista batted .241 with 27 home runs and 65 RBI in 92 games.

==== 2013 ====
On January 21, 2013, it was announced that Bautista would once again be the cover athlete of the Canadian edition of MLB 13: The Show. He hit his 200th career home run in a game against the Boston Red Sox on June 29. On July 6, he was elected to his fourth consecutive All-Star Game, and his third as the starting right fielder for the American League. At the time of his selection, he batted .264 with 20 home runs and 52 RBI. In the All-Star Game, he recorded the game-winning RBI on a sacrifice fly in the 4th inning as the AL won 3–0.

Playing against the Oakland Athletics on July 30, Bautista hit his 25th home run of the season. In doing so, he became the fourth player in Blue Jays franchise history to hit at least 25 home runs in four consecutive seasons, joining Bell (1984–1987), Carter (1991–1996), and Delgado (1996–2004). His season ended prematurely for the second consecutive time on September 4, when it was announced that he would be shut down with a left hip bone bruise. Bautista finished 2013 with a .259 batting average, 28 home runs, and 73 RBI.

==== 2014 ====
Bautista opened the 2014 season with a streak of 37 games in which he reached base safely. His streak, the longest to open a season in Blue Jays franchise history, came to an end on May 11, 2014, when he went 0–4. On June 18, he recorded his 1,000 career hit in a game against the New York Yankees. Bautista was named as the American League Captain for the 2014 Major League Baseball Home Run Derby on June 23. On July 6, it was announced that not only was he elected to his fifth consecutive All-Star Game, but, for the second time, received the highest number of votes in the Majors, with 5,859,019.

On August 10, Bautista ended the longest game in franchise history by hitting an opposite field single to drive in Munenori Kawasaki in the 19th inning, and gave the Jays the 6–5 win over the Detroit Tigers. On August 26, Bautista hit his 25th home run of the season, and in doing so, joined Carter and Delgado as the only Blue Jays players in franchise history to hit at least 25 in five or more consecutive seasons. Four days later, Bautista hit his 100th career home run at Rogers Centre, a two-run shot off Yankees starter Michael Pineda, and his fourth straight game with a home run which tied a career-high. He would go on to hit a home run on August 31, extending his home run streak to five games and establishing a new career-high.

In a home game against the Chicago Cubs on September 8, Bautista hit his 200th home run as a Blue Jay, joining George Bell, Carlos Delgado, Joe Carter, and Vernon Wells as the only players with 200 or more home runs in franchise history. Bautista finished 2014 with a .286 batting average, 35 home runs, and 103 RBI. He won his third Silver Slugger Award for his efforts.

==== 2015 ====
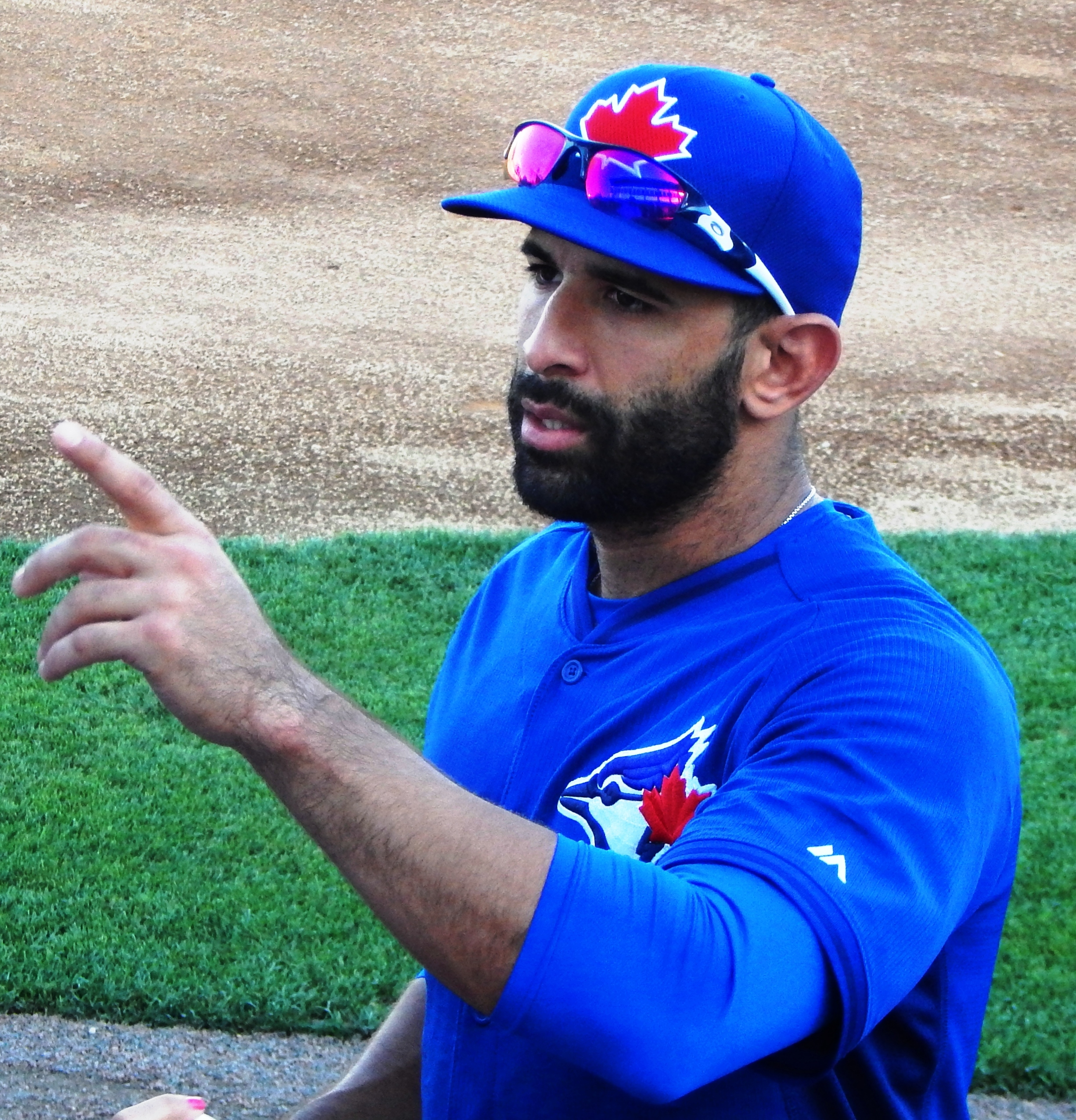
Bautista talking to fans during 2015 spring training

In early 2015, Bautista earned 10-and-5 rights by having at least 10 years of service time in the big-leagues, with the last 5 being on the same team. These rights give Bautista the ability to veto any trade he would be involved in. In a home game against the Baltimore Orioles on April 21, 2015, Bautista hit his 250th career home run. He injured his right shoulder during that game, attempting to throw out Delmon Young at first base. He was held out of the lineup for several days before returning, exclusively as the designated hitter. Bautista received a cortisone shot on May 24 and returned to the outfield on June 2, against the Washington Nationals. On July 6, Bautista was named to his sixth-consecutive All-Star team, as a reserve outfielder at Great American Ball Park in Cincinnati. However, on July 11, it was announced that he would sit out the game due to a shoulder injury. Bautista tied Vernon Wells for second place on the Blue Jays' all-time home run list on July 21, when he hit his 223rd home run for Toronto in a 7–1 win over the Oakland Athletics. He surpassed Wells on July 24 in a 5–2 loss to the Seattle Mariners.

On September 30, Bautista surpassed the 40 home run mark for the third time in his career, hitting a solo shot in the 9th inning against the Orioles to extend the Blue Jays lead to 11–1. The Blue Jays would win the game, 15–2, and clinch the American League East.

Bautista finished the 2015 regular season with a .250 batting average, 40 home runs, and 114 RBI. He also walked more than he struck out for the second consecutive year, totaling 110 walks to 106 strikeouts. For the season, he had the lowest line drive percentage of all major league hitters (13.9%). From 2010 to 2015, he batted .268 with 153 doubles, 227 home runs, 582 RBI, 574 walks, 576 strikeouts, .390 OBP, .555 SLG, .945 OPS, and 156 OPS+. In that span, he hit more home runs than any other major leaguer, 28 ahead of second-place Miguel Cabrera, was second in slugging percentage and walks, third in OPS and OPS+, and fifth in OBP.

On October 8, 2015, with just over 1,400 career games played, Bautista made his postseason debut against the Texas Rangers in the American League Division Series (ALDS). In the 5th and final game of the series on October 14, Bautista hit a three-run home run off Sam Dyson that gave the Jays a 6–3 lead that they would not relinquish, sending Toronto to the American League Championship Series (ALCS). Bautista watched the home run and flipped his bat high into the air before running the bases, a celebratory gesture that was applauded by Blue Jays fans and media outlets, while drawing the ire of Rangers players as unsportsmanlike, in the midst of a 53-minute 7th inning laden with controversy. A vital symbol of Toronto's first postseason appearance since 1993, the bat flip was voted Esurance's MLB Award for Best Play on Offense for 2015. In the five games of the ALDS, Bautista batted .273 with two home runs and five RBI.

In Game 3 of the ALCS against the Kansas City Royals, Bautista had one hit and two walks, joining Keith Hernandez as the only players in MLB postseason history to reach base three times on their birthday. The Blue Jays would win the game, 11–8. In Game 6, Bautista hit two home runs, including a two-run game-tying homer at the top of the 8th inning to tie the game at 3–3; however the Royals would win 4–3 to take the pennant.

On November 3, 2015, Toronto exercised Bautista's $14 million option for 2016.

==== 2016 ====
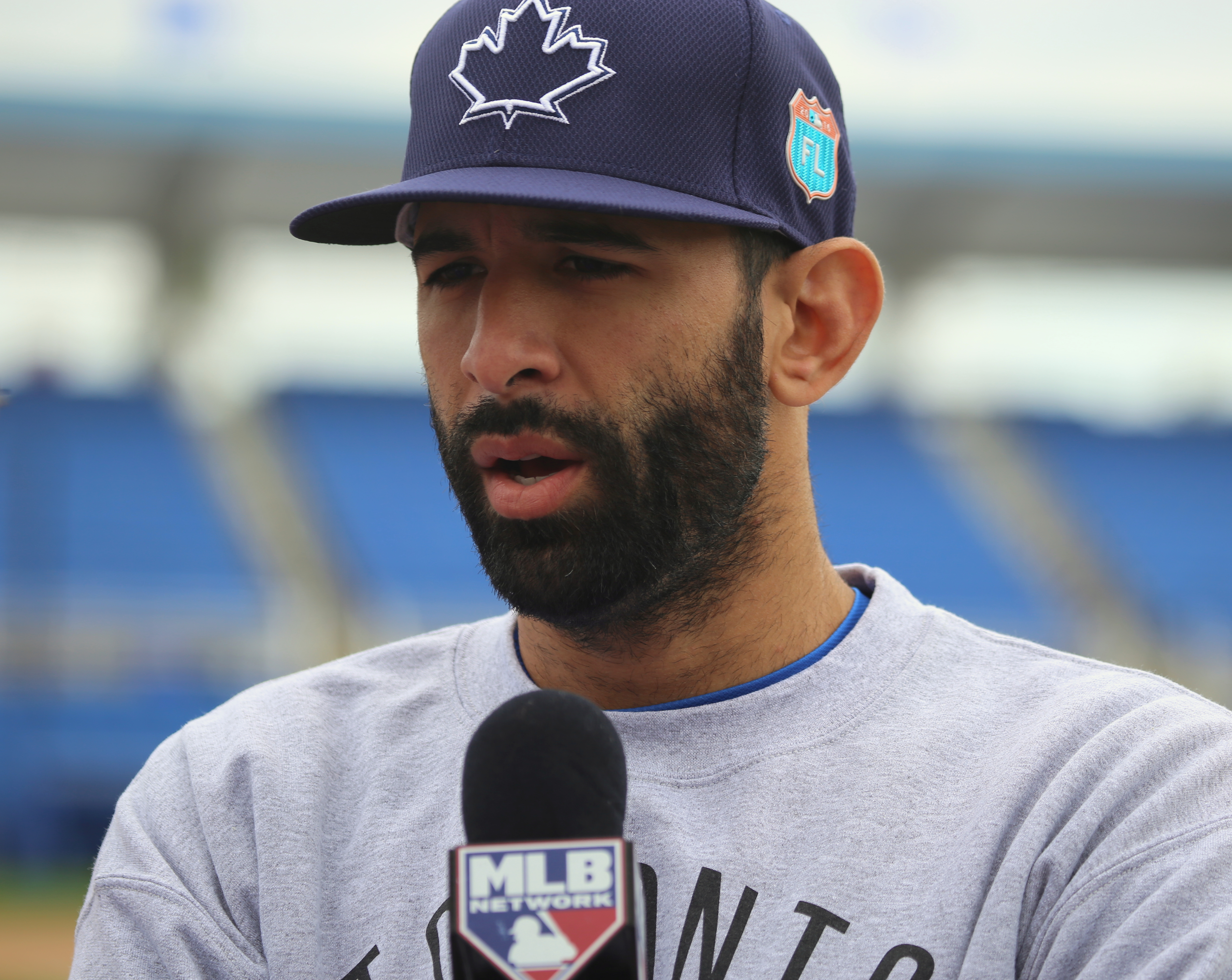
Bautista with Toronto in 2016

During his final regular season plate appearance against the Texas Rangers on May 15, 2016, Bautista was hit by a pitch from Matt Bush, which many believed to be retaliation by the Rangers organization for Bautista's bat flip in the 2015 ALDS. Two batters later, Bautista, intending to break-up a double play, made a hard slide into second baseman Rougned Odor. Although the slide did not make any contact, Odor pushed Bautista, who shoved back, followed by Odor punching Bautista in the jaw. This ignited a bench-clearing brawl. Bautista was handed a one-game suspension by the league for his part in the melee, which he appealed. On May 27, MLB announced that they had upheld the suspension. During the day of his suspension, Bautista served as the public address announcer at Rogers Centre. On June 17, he was placed on the 15-day disabled list due to an injury to his left big toe. He returned from the DL near the end of July. On August 2, Bautista hit his 300th career home run, a solo shot off Houston Astros starter Lance McCullers Jr. He would finish the season batting .234 with 22 home runs and 69 RBI in 116 games, helping the Blue Jays to a second consecutive appearance in the ALCS.

On November 7, the Blue Jays extended a $17.2 million qualifying offer to Bautista, which he declined on November 14.

==== 2017 ====
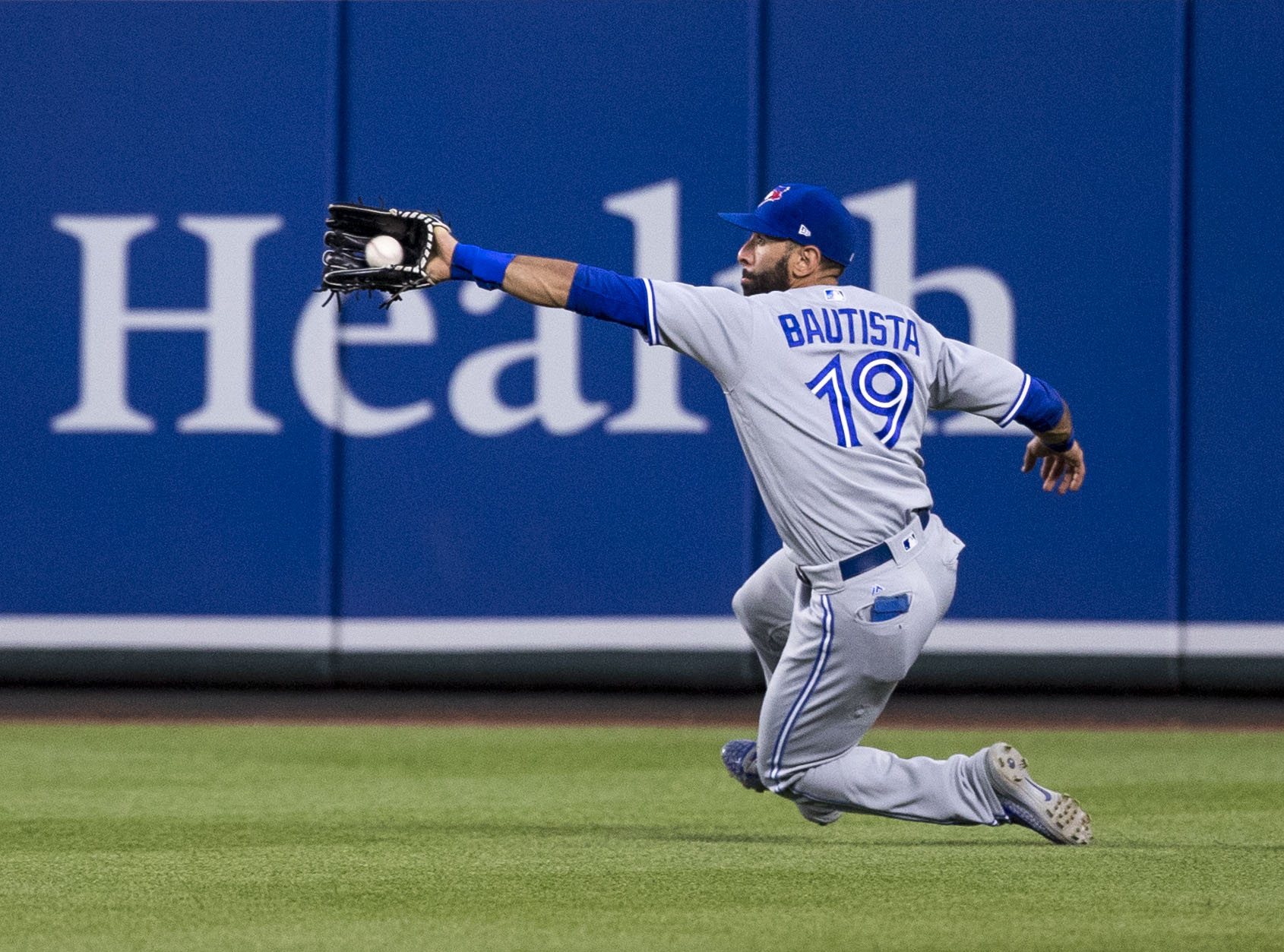
Bautista making a sliding catch at Oriole Park at Camden Yards in 2017

On January 18, 2017, Bautista signed a one-year, $18 million contract with the Blue Jays, avoiding arbitration. The contract included a $17 million mutual option for the 2018 season, as well as a $20 million vesting option for 2019. On August 11, Bautista reached the 20 home run mark for the eighth consecutive season.

Bautista ended the year batting .203 with 23 home runs and 65 RBI in 157 games. His .203 batting average was the lowest of all qualified major league batters. The Blue Jays declined Bautista's option for 2018 on November 4, 2017, marking the end of his tenure in Toronto.

=== Atlanta Braves ===
On April 18, 2018, Bautista signed a minor league contract with the Atlanta Braves. After playing a few games for the Gwinnett Stripers, the Braves promoted Bautista to start at third base for the first of a three-game series against the San Francisco Giants on May 4. On May 12, 2018, Bautista hit his first home run with the Braves. Bautista batted .143 with two home runs and five RBIs in 35 at bats over 12 games played before being released by the Braves on May 20.

=== New York Mets ===
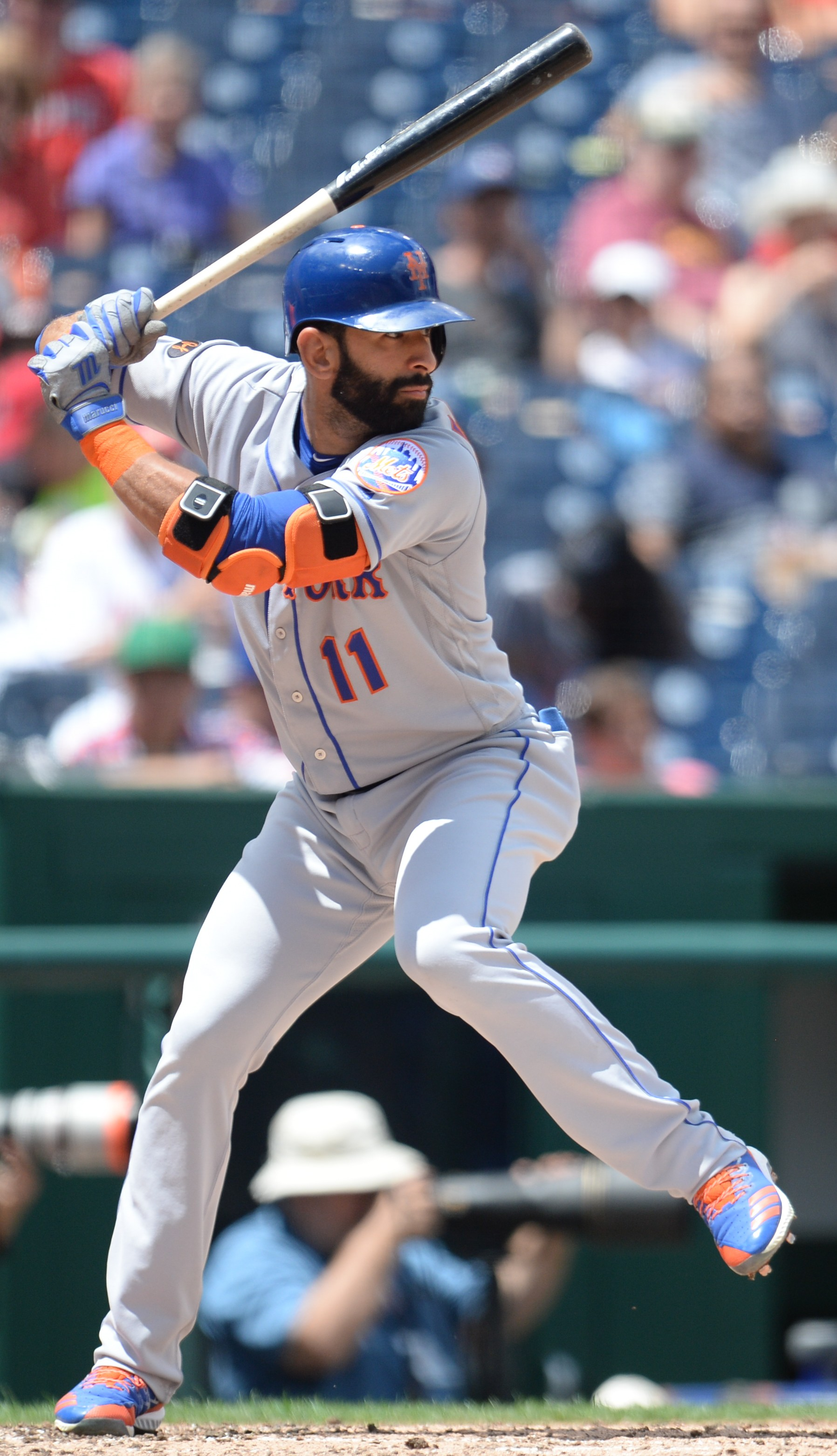
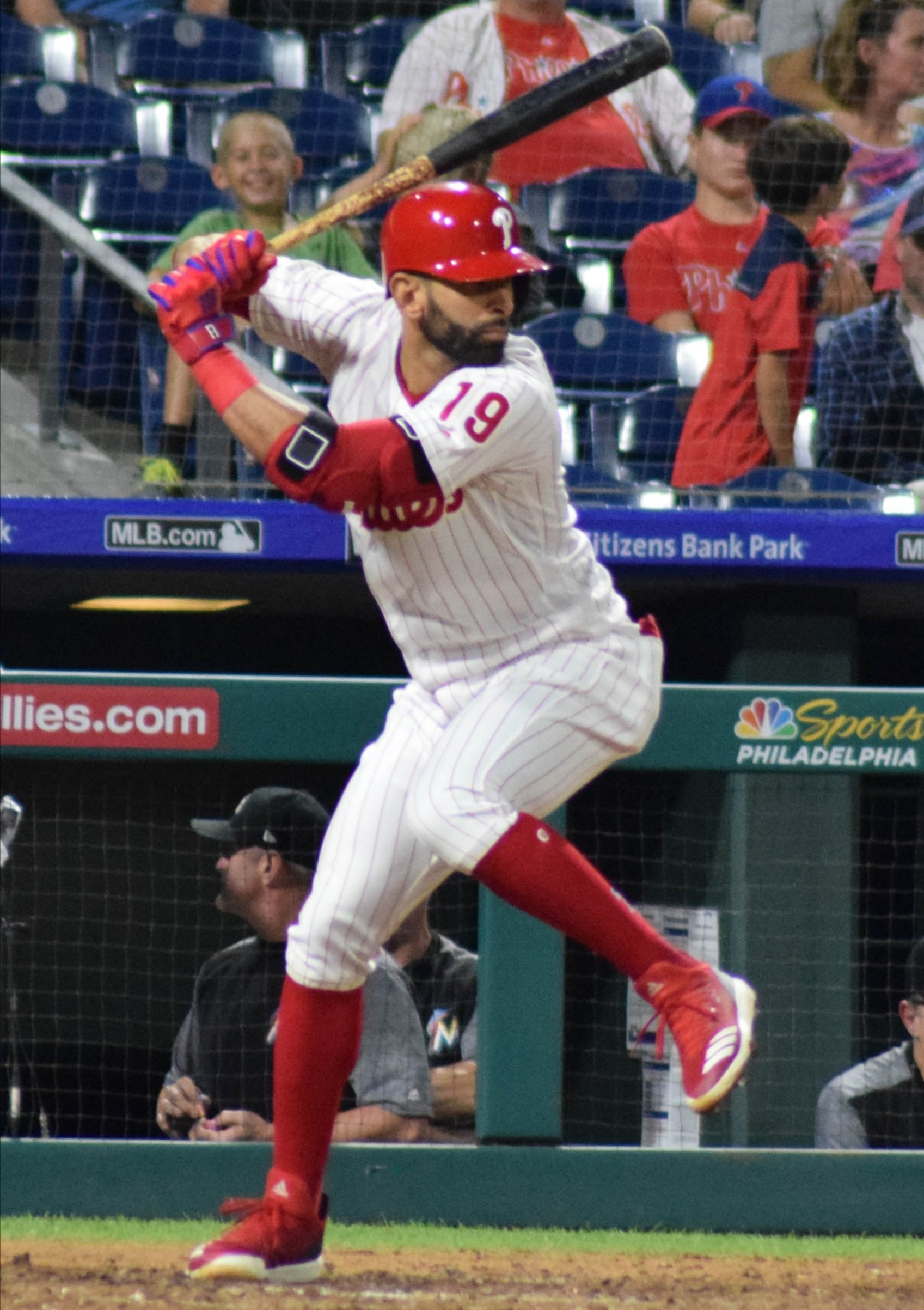
Bautista in the 2018 season: with the New York Mets (left) and with the Philadelphia Phillies (right)

On May 22, 2018, Bautista signed a one-year contract with the New York Mets. On June 22, he hit his first home run as a Met against the Los Angeles Dodgers, making it his third of the season (his previous two being with the Braves). On July 6, Bautista hit a walk-off grand slam in the bottom of the 9th inning against the Tampa Bay Rays, the first walk-off home run of his career. In 83 games for the Mets, he batted .204 with 9 home runs, 37 RBI, and a .351 OBP.

=== Philadelphia Phillies ===
On August 28, 2018, the Mets traded Bautista to the Philadelphia Phillies for a player to be named later or cash. He batted .244 with two home runs and 6 RBI in 27 games with the Phillies, and posted a .404 OBP and .870 OPS. He was the 9th-oldest player in the National League. Bautista elected free agency on October 29.

=== Post–2018 ===
In November 2019, Bautista expressed desire to continue his career after taking the 2019 season off.

In March 2020, reports surfaced he was hoping to return as a two-way player. He had joined former Blue Jays teammate Marcus Stroman, a starting pitcher to workout with during the offseason. Bautista began following Stroman's training regime and which eventually led to a few social media videos posted by him, showing Bautista pitching and Stroman sharing the opinion that he could "easily" pitch out of a Major League bullpen. Several reports followed suggesting he was eying a return to MLB as a pitcher, who could also provide at bats from another position or as a DH, but Bautista quashed the rumour quickly. "Just to kind of clear the record, I've never stated that it was my plan or desire to make it to the big leagues as a big-league pitcher," he told MLB Network Radio. He did, however, leave the door open to an opportunity to pitch should it arise.

=== Retirement ===
In March 2023, the Blue Jays announced that Bautista would be inducted onto their Level of Excellence on August 12, 2023, in ceremony prior to their game versus the Chicago Cubs. The day before the ceremony, Bautista signed a one-day contract with the team and formally announced that he will retire as a Blue Jay.

== Post-playing career ==
On May 12, 2022, Bautista was named a special advisor to the general manager for the Leones del Escogido in the Dominican Professional Baseball League.

Bautista garnered 1.6% of votes in the 2024 National Baseball Hall of Fame election, below the threshold to appear on future ballots.

On February 12, 2025, Bautista was inducted into the Canadian Baseball Hall of Fame alongside Érik Bédard, Greg Hamilton, Amanda Asay, Arleene Johnson, and Gerry Snyder.

== International career ==
Bautista represented the Dominican Republic national baseball team at the 2009 World Baseball Classic and 2017 World Baseball Classic.

On February 7, 2017, he was selected to play at the 2017 World Baseball Classic.

On March 12, 2020, he was selected to play for the Dominican Republic at the 2020 Summer Olympics Americas Qualifying, but on the same day, qualifying was postponed due to the COVID-19 pandemic.

The Americas qualifier was later rescheduled to be held from May 31 through June 5 in Port St. Lucie and West Palm Beach, Florida, with Bautista as the team's starting first baseman.

The Dominican Republic placed second in the Olympics Americas Qualifying, and advanced to the Final Qualifying Tournament, which they won, giving them and Bautista a spot in the 2020 Summer Olympics, where they won a bronze medal.

== Awards and accomplishments ==
=== Awards ===
- 5× American League Player of the Month (Jul. 2010, Aug. 2010, Apr. 2011, May 2011, Jun. 2012)
- 4× American League Player of the Week (May 16, 2010; August 1, 2010; August 29, 2010; July 3, 2011)
- Esurance's MLB Award for Best Play, Offense (2015)
- 2× Hank Aaron Award (2010, 2011)
- John Cerutti Award (2010)
- 6× Major League Baseball All-Star (2010–15)
- 2× Neil MacCarl Award (2010, 2011)
- 3× Silver Slugger Award at outfield (2010, 2011, 2014)
- Toronto Blue Jays Most Improved Player (2010)
- Olympic Bronze medalist: 2020 Summer Olympics
- Added to the Blue Jays Level of Excellence on August 12, 2023

=== Accomplishments ===
- 2× American League bases on balls leader (2011, 2015)
- 2× Major League Baseball home run leader (2010, 2011)
- Major League Baseball on-base plus slugging percentage leader (2011)
- Major League Baseball slugging percentage leader (2011)
- Toronto Blue Jays top-ten in career on-base percentage, slugging percentage, on-base plus slugging percentage, runs scored, total bases, home runs, runs batted in, bases on balls and adjusted on-base plus slugging percentage (through 2015)

=== Records ===
- Major League Baseball record for largest single-season home run increase (39 from 2009 to 2010)
- Toronto Blue Jays single-season most bases on balls (132 in 2011)
- Toronto Blue Jays single-season most home runs (54 in 2010)
- Toronto Blue Jays single-season most offensive WAR (8.3 in 2011)

== Personal life ==
Bautista's father is Spanish.

Bautista and his then-girlfriend, Neisha Croyle, had their first daughter together, born April 2011. His second daughter was born in November 2012. In 2011, Bautista set up a program to aid athletes to have the same opportunity he had to attend American universities. Initially focused on the Dominican Republic, it has expanded to Canada. Bautista and Neisha Croyle were married November 2017.

Bautista's younger brother, Luis, played college baseball at Florida International University. He was drafted by the Chicago Cubs in the 32nd round of the 2007 Major League Baseball draft and played in their minor league system through 2008.

A species of weevil, Sicoderus bautistai, was named for Bautista in 2018.

In January 2024, Bautista acquired primary ownership of USL Championship soccer club Las Vegas Lights FC.

=== Business ventures ===
After retiring from professional baseball, Bautista became active in a range of business ventures. According to a 2025 interview with *The Globe and Mail*, he invested in the Canadian e-commerce company Endy, as well as in real estate, food technology, cleantech, and private equity. In 2024, Bautista became a co-owner of Las Vegas Lights FC, a club in the United Soccer League. He has stated that USL ownership offers more direct involvement than larger leagues and sees potential in the league’s future growth and planned promotion/relegation system. Bautista often takes advisory or branding roles in the startups he supports, focusing on ventures where he can contribute beyond capital.

== See also ==
- List of Major League Baseball career home run leaders
- List of Major League Baseball career putouts as a right fielder leaders
- List of Major League Baseball players from the Dominican Republic
- List of Olympic medalists in baseball
- List of Toronto Blue Jays team records
- Toronto Blue Jays award winners and league leaders
