= Flit Holliday =

American baseball player

- Outfielder
- Born: January 26, 1914; Beaumont, Texas, U.S.
- Died: August 22, 1992 (aged 78); Edwardsville, Illinois, U.S.
- Batted: Left Threw: Left

Negro league baseball debut
- 1938, for the Atlanta Black Crackers

Last appearance
- 1938, for the Atlanta Black Crackers
- Stats at Baseball Reference

Teams
- Atlanta Black Crackers (1938)

Charles Dourcy Holliday (January 26, 1914 – August 22, 1992), nicknamed "Flit", was an American Negro league outfielder in the 1930s.

A native of Beaumont, Texas, Holliday played for the Atlanta Black Crackers in 1938. In 11 recorded games, he posted four hits in 31 plate appearances. Holliday died in Edwardsville, Illinois in 1992 at age 78.
