= Eddie Dixon =

American baseball player (1916–1993)

- Pitcher
- Born: May 15, 1916; Bonifay, Florida, U.S.
- Died: July 8, 1993 (aged 77); Fort Lauderdale, Florida, U.S.
- Batted: Right Threw: Right

Negro league baseball debut
- 1938, for the Atlanta Black Crackers

Last appearance
- 1940, for the Baltimore Elite Giants
- Stats at Baseball Reference

Teams
- Atlanta Black Crackers (1938); Indianapolis ABCs (1939); Baltimore Elite Giants (1940)

Eddie Lee Dixon (May 15, 1916 – July 8, 1993), nicknamed "Bullet", was an American Negro league pitcher from 1938 to 1940.

A native of Bonifay, Florida, Dixon attended Morris Brown College. He made his Negro leagues debut in 1938 with the Atlanta Black Crackers, and remained with the team the following season when it moved to Indianapolis. Dixon finished his career in 1940 with a short stint with the Baltimore Elite Giants. He died in Fort Lauderdale, Florida in 1993 at age 77.
