= Guy Smith (baseball) =

American baseball player

- Pitcher

Negro league baseball debut
- 1939, for the Indianapolis ABCs

Last appearance
- 1939, for the Indianapolis ABCs

Teams
- Indianapolis ABCs (1939)

Guy Smith is an American former Negro league pitcher who played in the 1930s.

Smith played for the Indianapolis ABCs in 1939. In three recorded appearances on the mound, he posted a 4.09 ERA over 22 innings.
