= Bo Briggery =

American baseball player

- Shortstop
- Born: August 8, 1908; Walton County, Georgia, U.S.
- Died: September 12, 1971 (aged 63); Walton County, Georgia, U.S.
- Batted: Unknown Threw: Unknown

Negro league baseball debut
- 1932, for the Atlanta Black Crackers

Last appearance
- 1932, for the Atlanta Black Crackers
- Stats at Baseball Reference

Teams
- Atlanta Black Crackers (1932)

Oscar Robert "Bo" Briggery (August 8, 1908 – September 12, 1971) was an American professional baseball shortstop in the Negro leagues. He played with the Atlanta Black Crackers in 1932.
