= Jim Canada =

American baseball player

- First baseman
- Born: January 9, 1912; Montgomery, Alabama, U.S.
- Died: January 17, 1975 (aged 63); Bessemer, Alabama, U.S.
- Batted: Left Threw: Right

Negro league baseball debut
- 1937, for the Birmingham Black Barons

Last appearance
- 1945, for the Memphis Red Sox
- Stats at Baseball Reference

Teams
- Birmingham Black Barons (1937–1938); Atlanta Black Crackers (1938); Jacksonville Red Caps (1942); Memphis Red Sox (1943–1945)

Jim Canada (January 9, 1912 – January 17, 1975) was an American Negro league first baseman in the 1930s and 1940s.

A native of Montgomery, Alabama, Canada made his Negro leagues debut in 1937 with the Birmingham Black Barons. He went on to play for the Atlanta Black Crackers and Jacksonville Red Caps, and finished his career with a three-year stint with the Memphis Red Sox from 1943 to 1945. Canada died in Bessemer, Alabama in 1975 at age 63.
