= Herman Howard =

American baseball player

- Pitcher
- Born: March 10, 1910; Birmingham, Alabama, U.S.
- Died: December 30, 1969 (aged 59); Birmingham, Alabama, U.S.
- Batted: Left Threw: Left

Negro league baseball debut
- 1937, for the Birmingham Black Barons

Last appearance
- 1946, for the Chicago American Giants
- Stats at Baseball Reference

Teams
- Birmingham Black Barons (1937); Atlanta Black Crackers (1938); Jacksonville Red Caps (1938); Memphis Red Sox (1939); Cleveland Bears (1939); Birmingham Black Barons (1940); Chicago American Giants (1946)

Herman Eugene Howard (March 10, 1910 – December 30, 1969), nicknamed "Red", was an American Negro league pitcher between 1937 and 1946.

A native of Birmingham, Alabama, Howard made his Negro leagues debut in 1937 with the Birmingham Black Barons. He went on to play for several teams, finishing his career in 1946 with the Chicago American Giants. Howard died in Birmingham in 1969 at age 59.
