= Alex Crumbley =

American baseball player

- Outfielder
- Born: May 22, 1909; Sparta, Georgia, U.S.
- Died: November 20, 1938 (aged 29); Winston-Salem, North Carolina, U.S.
- Batted: Left Threw: Right

Negro league baseball debut
- 1937, for the New York Black Yankees

Last appearance
- 1938, for the Atlanta Black Crackers
- Stats at Baseball Reference

Teams
- New York Black Yankees (1937-1938); Washington Black Senators (1938); Pittsburgh Crawfords (1938); Atlanta Black Crackers (1938)

Alex Crumbley Jr. (May 22, 1909 – November 20, 1938) was an American professional baseball outfielder in the Negro leagues. He played with the New York Black Yankees, Washington Black Senators, Pittsburgh Crawfords, and Atlanta Black Crackers from 1937 to 1938.

In 1938, Crumbley tied the Major League rookie record for the most teams played for in a single season, appearing in at least one game for four different clubs (Note: The other players to do this are Frank Huelsman in 1904, Charles Zomphier in 1927, Gerves Fagan in 1943, and José Bautista in 2004.).
