= Duke Cleveland =

American baseball player

- Outfielder
- Born: November 25, 1916; Alapaha, Georgia, U.S.
- Died: August 13, 1970 (aged 53); Jacksonville, Florida, U.S.
- Batted: Left Threw: Right

Negro league baseball debut
- 1938, for the Jacksonville Red Caps

Last appearance
- 1947, for the Indianapolis Clowns
- Stats at Baseball Reference

Teams
- Jacksonville Red Caps (1938); Cleveland Bears (1939–1940); Jacksonville Red Caps (1941–1942); Cleveland Buckeyes (1942–1943); Jacksonville Red Caps (1944); Indianapolis Clowns (1946–1947)

Howard Cleveland (November 25, 1916 – August 13, 1970), nicknamed "Duke", was an American Negro league outfielder between 1938 and 1947.

A native of Alapaha, Georgia, Cleveland made his Negro leagues debut in 1938 with the Jacksonville Red Caps. He remained with the club through 1942, as the team moved to Cleveland and then back to Jacksonville. Cleveland went on to play for the Cleveland Buckeyes, returned to the Red Caps in 1944, and finished his career with the Indianapolis Clowns in 1946 and 1947. He died in Jacksonville, Florida in 1970 at age 53.
