= Leroy Holmes (baseball) =

American baseball player (1912–1985)

- Shortstop
- Born: December 12, 1912; Brunswick, Georgia, U.S.
- Died: October 7, 1985 (aged 72); Atlanta, Georgia, U.S.
- Batted: Left Threw: Right

Negro league baseball debut
- 1937, for the Jacksonville Red Caps

Last appearance
- 1945, for the Cincinnati Clowns
- Stats at Baseball Reference

Teams
- Jacksonville Red Caps (1937–1938); Cleveland Bears (1939); Indianapolis ABCs (1939); New York Black Yankees (1945); Cincinnati Clowns (1945)

Leroy Holmes (December 12, 1912 – October 7, 1985), nicknamed "Philly" and "Buddy", was an American Negro league shortstop between 1937 and 1945.

A native of Brunswick, Georgia, Holmes was the brother of fellow Negro leaguer Lefty Holmes and attended Bethune-Cookman College. He made his Negro leagues debut in 1937 for the Jacksonville Red Caps, and played for Jacksonville again the following season. Holmes split 1939 with the Cleveland Bears and Indianapolis ABCs, then played for the New York Black Yankees and Cincinnati Clowns in 1945. He died in Atlanta, Georgia in 1985 at age 72.
