= Henry Turner (baseball) =

American baseball player (born 1913)

- Catcher / Outfielder
- Born: September 1, 1913; Lloyd, Florida, U.S.
- Died: Unknown
- Batted: Right Threw: Right

Negro league baseball debut
- 1937, for the Jacksonville Red Caps

Last appearance
- 1943, for the Cleveland Buckeyes

Career statistics
- Batting average: .284
- Hits: 80
- Home runs: 1
- Runs batted in: 48
- Stolen bases: 4

Teams
- Jacksonville Red Caps/Cleveland Bears (1937-1942); Cleveland Buckeyes (1943)

Career highlights and awards
- Negro American League batting champion (1939)

Henry "Flash" Turner (September 1, 1913 – date of death unknown) was an American professional baseball catcher and outfielder in the Negro leagues. He played with the Jacksonville Red Caps/Cleveland Bears from 1937 to 1942 and the Cleveland Buckeyes in 1943.

== Career ==
Turner broke into the major leagues of black baseball with the Jacksonville Red Caps in 1937, appearing in five games. He remained with the club in 1938 and batted .292 in 14 documented games. In 1939, when stayed with the club when they became the Cleveland Bears and led the Negro American League in batting average with .370 in 28 recorded games played with 21 runs batted in. He played in 26 documented games the following year and batted .200 before the club returned to Jacksonville as the Red Caps, where he played 17 documented combined games over the next two years, collecting 10 hits. He closed his career out with the Cleveland Buckeyes and batted .186 in 17 recorded games. He was released by Cleveland prior to the start of the 1944 season.
