= Hap Glenn =

American baseball player (1913–1977)

- Third baseman
- Born: August 27, 1913; Stone Mountain, Georgia, U.S.
- Died: March 13, 1977 (aged 63); Warren, Ohio, U.S.
- Batted: Right Threw: Right

Negro league baseball debut
- 1937, for the Atlanta Black Crackers

Last appearance
- 1938, for the Atlanta Black Crackers
- Stats at Baseball Reference

Teams
- Atlanta Black Crackers (1937–1938)

Oscar Glenn (August 27, 1913 – March 13, 1977), nicknamed "Hap", was an American Negro league third baseman in the 1930s.

A native of Stone Mountain, Georgia, Glenn played for the Atlanta Black Crackers in 1937 and 1938. He died in Warren, Ohio in 1977 at age 63.
