= Hosea Allen =

American baseball player

- Pitcher
- Born: October 23, 1918; Jacksonville, Florida, U.S.
- Died: September 26, 1948 (aged 29); Tampa, Florida, U.S.
- Batted: Unknown Threw: Right

Negro league baseball debut
- 1941, for the Jacksonville Red Caps

Last appearance
- 1947, for the Indianapolis–Cincinnati Clowns
- Stats at Baseball Reference

Teams
- Jacksonville Red Caps (1941-1942); Cleveland Buckeyes (1946); Indianapolis–Cincinnati Clowns (1947)

Hosea Walter "Buster" Allen (October 23, 1918 – September 26, 1948), also listed as Hoses Allen, was an American professional baseball pitcher in the Negro leagues. He played with the Jacksonville Red Caps, Cleveland Buckeyes, and the Indianapolis–Cincinnati Clowns from 1941 to 1947.
