= Geech Yarborough =

American baseball player

- Catcher / Pitcher
- Batted: Unknown Threw: Unknown

Negro league baseball debut
- 1932, for the Atlanta Black Crackers

Last appearance
- 1940, for the Newark Eagles

Teams
- Atlanta Black Crackers (1932); Newark Eagles (1940)

Geech Yarborough was an American professional baseball catcher and pitcher in the Negro leagues. He played with the Atlanta Black Crackers in 1932 and the Newark Eagles in 1940.
