= Henry Smith (baseball) =

Professional baseball player

- Second baseman
- Born: 1913 (age 112–113); Houston, Texas
- Batted: Right Threw: Right

Negro league baseball debut
- 1942, for the Jacksonville Red Caps

Last appearance
- 1945, for the Indianapolis/Cincinnati Clowns

Teams
- Jacksonville Red Caps (1942); Chicago American Giants (1942–1943); Indianapolis/Cincinnati Clowns (1943–1945)

Henry Smith (1913 – death date unknown) was a Negro league baseball second baseman in the 1940s.

Smith made his Negro leagues debut in 1942 with the Jacksonville Red Caps and the Chicago American Giants. He went on to play for the Indianapolis/Cincinnati Clowns through his final season in 1945.
