= Jimmy Shamberger =

American baseball player

- Third baseman
- Born: October 15, 1918; Lower Peach Tree, Alabama, U.S.
- Threw: Right

Negro league baseball debut
- 1938, for the Atlanta Black Crackers

Last appearance
- 1940, for the Indianapolis Crawfords

Teams
- Atlanta Black Crackers (1938); Indianapolis Crawfords (1940)

James Jim Shamberger (October 15, 1918 - death date unknown) was an American Negro league baseball third baseman who played between 1938 and 1940.

A native of Lower Peach Tree, Alabama, Shamberger made his Negro leagues debut in 1938 with the Atlanta Black Crackers. He went on to play for the Indianapolis Crawfords in 1940.
