= Gene Smith (baseball) =

American baseball player

- Infielder
- Born: November 28, 1911; Key West, Florida, U.S.
- Died: October 3, 1995 (aged 83)
- Batted: Right Threw: Right

Negro league baseball debut
- 1941, for the Jacksonville Red Caps

Last appearance
- 1946, for the Indianapolis Clowns

Teams
- Jacksonville Red Caps (1941–1942); Cleveland Buckeyes (1942); Indianapolis Clowns (1946)

Eugene L. "Gene" Smith (November 28, 1911 – October 3, 1995) was an American Negro league baseball infielder who played in the 1940s.

A native of Key West, Florida, Smith made his Negro leagues debut in 1941 with the Jacksonville Red Caps. He went on to play for the Cleveland Buckeyes, and finished his career in 1946 with the Indianapolis Clowns.
