= John McFarlin =

American baseball player

- First baseman
- Born: August 24, 1907; Atlanta, Georgia
- Died: September 26, 1947 (aged 40); Atlanta, Georgia
- Threw: Right

Negro league baseball debut
- 1932, for the Atlanta Black Crackers

Last appearance
- 1932, for the Atlanta Black Crackers

Teams
- Atlanta Black Crackers (1932)

John Robert McFarlin (August 24, 1907 – September 26, 1947) was an American Negro league first baseman in the 1930s.

A native of Atlanta, Georgia, McFarlin played for the Atlanta Black Crackers in 1932. In three recorded games, he posted two hits in ten plate appearances. McFarlin died in Atlanta in 1947 at age 40.
