= Parnell Woods =

American baseball player

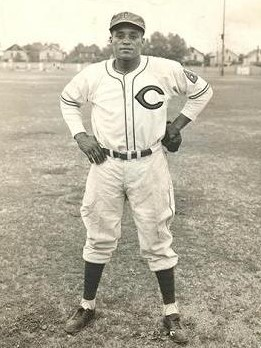
- Third baseman
- Born: February 16, 1912; Birmingham, Alabama, U.S.
- Died: July 22, 1977 (aged 65); Cleveland, Ohio, U.S.
- Batted: Right Threw: Right

debut
- 1937, for the Birmingham Black Barons

Last appearance
- 1949, for the Oakland Oaks
- Managerial record at Baseball Reference

Teams
- Birmingham Black Barons (1937–1938, 1940); Cleveland Bears (1939–1940); Jacksonville Red Caps (1941–1942); Cincinnati/Cleveland Buckeyes (1942); Cleveland Buckeyes (1943–1945); Oakland Oaks (1949)

Career highlights and awards
- 4× All-Star (1939, 1940, 1941, 1942); Negro League World Series champion (1945)

Parnell L. Woods (February 16, 1912 – July 22, 1977) was an American third baseman in Negro league baseball. He played between 1937 and 1949.
