= Lefty Holmes =

- Pitcher
- Born: February 28, 1907; Brunswick, Georgia, U.S.
- Died: December 27, 1987 (aged 80); Brunswick, Georgia, U.S.
- Batted: Left Threw: Left

Negro league baseball debut
- 1929, for the Lincoln Giants

Last appearance
- 1940, for the New York Cubans
- Stats at Baseball Reference

Teams
- Lincoln Giants (1929); Cuban House of David (1931); Baltimore Black Sox (1932); Philadelphia Stars (1933-1934); Washington Elite Giants (1936); New York Cubans (1936, 1940); Washington Black Senators (1938)

Frank "Lefty" Holmes (February 28, 1907 – December 27, 1987), also nicknamed "Sonny", "Ducky", and "Eddie", was an American professional baseball pitcher in the Negro leagues. A native of Brunswick, Georgia, he was the brother of fellow Negro leaguer Philly Holmes, and played from 1929 to 1940 with multiple clubs. Holmes died in his hometown of Brunswick in 1987 at age 80.
