= Jasper Jones (baseball) =

American baseball player

- Outfielder

Negro league baseball debut
- 1932, for the Atlanta Black Crackers

Last appearance
- 1932, for the Atlanta Black Crackers

Teams
- Atlanta Black Crackers (1932)

Jasper "Jazz" Jones was an American Negro league outfielder in the 1930s.

Jones played for the Atlanta Black Crackers in 1932. In three recorded games, he posted two hits in 12 plate appearances.
