= Lamar Potter =

Professional baseball player

- Pitcher
- Batted: Unknown Threw: Unknown

Negro league baseball debut
- 1932, for the Atlanta Black Crackers

Last appearance
- 1932, for the Atlanta Black Crackers

Teams
- Atlanta Black Crackers (1932)

Lamar Potter was an American professional baseball pitcher in the Negro leagues. He played with the Atlanta Black Crackers in 1932.
