= Jack McLaurin =

1940s American baseball player

- Outfielder
- Batted: Unknown Threw: Unknown

Negro league baseball debut
- 1944, for the Jacksonville Red Caps

Last appearance
- 1948, for the Newark Eagles

Teams
- Jacksonville Red Caps (1944); Birmingham Black Barons (1945); Newark Eagles (1948)

Johnnie McLaurin was an American professional baseball outfielder in the Negro leagues. He played with the Jacksonville Red Caps in 1944, Birmingham Black Barons in 1945, and the Newark Eagles in 1948. In some sources, his career in combined with Felix McLaurin.
