= James Winston (baseball) =

American baseball player

- Pitcher

Negro league baseball debut
- 1931, for the Detroit Stars

Last appearance
- 1932, for the Atlanta Black Crackers
- Stats at Baseball Reference

Teams
- Detroit Stars (1931); Chicago American Giants (1931); Atlanta Black Crackers (1932)

James Winston is an American former Negro league pitcher who played in the 1930s.

Winston played for the Detroit Stars and the Chicago American Giants in 1931. The following season, he played for the Atlanta Black Crackers.
