= Indianapolis ABCs (disambiguation) =

The Indianapolis ABCs were a Negro league baseball team that played from 1913 until 1926.

Indianapolis ABCs may also refer to:

- Indianapolis ABCs (1931–1933), a Negro league baseball team that played from 1931 until 1933
- St. Louis–New Orleans Stars, known as the Indianapolis ABCs in 1938
- Atlanta Black Crackers, known as the Indianapolis ABCs in 1939
