= Ping Burke =

American baseball player

- Pitcher
- Born: Greensboro, Georgia, U.S.
- Batted: Right Threw: Right

Negro league baseball debut
- 1937, for the Atlanta Black Crackers

Last appearance
- 1937, for the Atlanta Black Crackers

Teams
- Atlanta Black Crackers (1937)

Walter Burke, nicknamed "Ping", is an American former Negro league pitcher who played in the 1930s.

A native of Greensboro, Georgia, Burke played for the Atlanta Black Crackers in 1937. In eight recorded career games on the mound, he posted a 0.95 ERA with 48 strikeouts over 47.1 innings.
