= Hipolito Arenas =

American baseball player (1907–1995)

- Born: August 13, 1907; Tampa, Florida, US
- Died: December 28, 1995 (aged 88); Tampa, Florida, US
- Threw: Right

Negro league baseball debut
- 1932, for the Atlanta Black Crackers

Last appearance
- 1932, for the Atlanta Black Crackers
- Stats at Baseball Reference

Teams
- Atlanta Black Crackers (1932)

Hipolito Kanterra Arenas, Sr. (August 13, 1907 – December 28, 1995), nicknamed "Torrento", was an American Negro league baseball player. Arenas grew up in Tampa, Florida, but also spent time in Ybor City, Florida. He would climb from local teams to the Negro leagues. Arenas played for the Atlanta Black Crackers from 1928 to 1929, and for the New York Cubans in 1930.

== Personal life ==
Arenas was born in 1907, in Tampa to Manuel and Facunda Arenas, both of which had immigrated to the United States from Cuba with their, at the time, 3 children. He was the second youngest out of 5 children, having 3 older sisters, Ynes, Theodora, and Juliana, and a younger brother, Cresencio. He worked for the Tampa Gas Company after his career in the Negro league. He married Erma Dancil, and had 5 children; Cecelia, Hipolito Jr., Jorge, Manuel, and Albert. He died December 28 of 1995, and is buried in Tampa's Rest Haven Memorial Park.

In earlier documentation, Arenas's ethnicity was listed as "mulatto", with later references listing him as black.
