= Gabby Kemp =

American baseball player (1919–1993)

- Second baseman
- Born: April 9, 1919; Winder, Georgia, U.S.
- Died: October 21, 1993 (aged 74); Atlanta, Georgia, U.S.
- Batted: Right Threw: Right

Negro league baseball debut
- 1937, for the Atlanta Black Crackers

Last appearance
- 1941, for the Jacksonville Red Caps

Teams
- As player: Atlanta Black Crackers (1937–1938); Jacksonville Red Caps (1938); Indianapolis ABCs (1939); Jacksonville Red Caps (1941); As manager: Atlanta Black Crackers (1938); Indianapolis ABCs (1939)

James Albert Kemp (April 9, 1919 – October 21, 1993), nicknamed "Gabby", was an American Negro league baseball second baseman and manager between 1937 and 1941.

A native of Winder, Georgia, Kemp made his Negro leagues debut in 1937 with the Atlanta Black Crackers. He served as player-manager of the club in 1938, and again in 1939 when the club moved to Indianapolis. Kemp finished his career with a short stint with the Jacksonville Red Caps in 1941. He died in Atlanta, Georgia in 1993 at age 74.
