= Benny Fields (baseball) =

- Second baseman / Third baseman
- Batted: Unknown Threw: Unknown

Negro league baseball debut
- 1930, for the Memphis Red Sox

Last appearance
- 1938, for the Birmingham Black Barons
- Stats at Baseball Reference

Teams
- Memphis Red Sox (1930); Cleveland Cubs (1932); Birmingham Black Barons (1938); Atlanta Black Crackers (1938)

Benjamin Fields was a professional baseball infielder in the Negro leagues. He played with the Memphis Red Sox, Cleveland Cubs, Birmingham Black Barons and Atlanta Black Crackers, and New York Black Yankees from 1930 to 1938.
