= Lefty Nelson =

American baseball player

- Pitcher
- Batted: Unknown Threw: Left

Negro league baseball debut
- 1937, for the Atlanta Black Crackers

Last appearance
- 1938, for the Newark Eagles

Teams
- Atlanta Black Crackers (1937); Newark Eagles (1938)

Lefty Nelson was an American professional baseball pitcher in the Negro leagues. He played with the Atlanta Black Crackers in 1937 and the Newark Eagles in 1938.
