= Roy Harding =

Professional baseballer

- Pitcher
- Batted: Unknown Threw: Unknown

Negro league baseball debut
- 1938, for the Atlanta Black Crackers

Last appearance
- 1938, for the Atlanta Black Crackers
- Stats at Baseball Reference

Teams
- Atlanta Black Crackers (1938)

Roy Harding was a professional baseball pitcher in the Negro leagues. He played with the Atlanta Black Crackers in 1938.
