= Eugene Tyler =

Professional baseball player

- Outfielder
- Batted: Right Threw: Right

Negro league baseball debut
- 1939, for the Cleveland Bears

Last appearance
- 1943, for the Kansas City Monarchs

Teams
- Cleveland Bears (1939); Cincinnati/Cleveland Buckeyes (1942); Kansas City Monarchs (1943)

Eugene Tyler was a Negro league outfielder between 1939 and 1943.

Tyler made his Negro leagues debut in 1939 with the Cleveland Bears. He went on to play for the Cincinnati/Cleveland Buckeyes in 1942, and finished his career with the Kansas City Monarchs the following season.
