= Joe Royal =

Joe Royal may refer to:

- Joe Royal (rugby union) (born 1985), New Zealand rugby player
- Joe Royal (baseball) (1912–1975), American baseball player

== See also ==
- Joe Royle (born 1949), English football manager
