= Willie Nixon =

American baseball player

- Right fielder
- Born: October 29, 1916; York, Alabama, U.S.
- Died: December 14, 1979 (aged 63)
- Batted: Unknown Threw: Unknown

Negro league baseball debut
- 1940, for the Newark Eagles

Last appearance
- 1941, for the Jacksonville Red Caps

Teams
- Newark Eagles (1940); Birmingham Black Barons (1940-1941); Jacksonville Red Caps (1941)

Willie D. Nixon (October 29, 1916 – December 14, 1979) was an American professional baseball right fielder in the Negro leagues.

== Career ==
Nixon played with the Newark Eagles, Birmingham Black Barons, and Jacksonville Red Caps in 1940 and 1941.
