= Bernard Fernandez (baseball) =

American baseball player

- Pitcher
- Born: March 5, 1918; Tampa, Florida, U.S.
- Died: November 29, 2014 (aged 96); North Las Vegas, Nevada, U.S.
- Batted: Right Threw: Right
- Stats at Baseball Reference

Teams
- Nebraska Giants (1933–1935); Civilian Conservation Corp (CCC) Baseball Team (1935–1938); Jacksonville Red Caps (1938, 1939); Atlanta Black Crackers (1938, 1939); Pepsi Cola Giants (1940, 1942, 1943–1944); Philadelphia Stars (1941, 1943, 1944, 1945, 1946); Sandblast Indians (1941); Brooklyn Royal Giants (1941); Brooklyn Brown Dodgers (1945); Pittsburgh Crawfords (1946); Richmond Giants (1947–1948); New York Black Yankees (1948–1949)

Bernardo Fernandez (March 5, 1918 – November 29, 2014) was an American professional baseball pitcher who played in the Negro leagues. He played for the Atlanta Black Crackers, Jacksonville Red Caps, Philadelphia Stars, Brooklyn Royal Giants, Pittsburgh Crawfords and New York Black Yankees, among other independent and minor Negro league teams.

He was born in Tampa, Florida, and died at 96 in North Las Vegas, Nevada, where he lived.
