= Telosh Howard =

American baseball player

- Pitcher
- Born: Macon, Georgia, U.S.
- Batted: Right Threw: Right

Negro league baseball debut
- 1932, for the Atlanta Black Crackers

Last appearance
- 1939, for the Atlanta Black Crackers
- Stats at Baseball Reference

Teams
- Atlanta Black Crackers (1932, 1937–1939)

Telosh Howard is an American former Negro league pitcher who played in the 1930s.

A native of Macon, Georgia, Howard played several seasons for the Atlanta Black Crackers between 1932 and 1939. His most productive recorded season came in 1938, when he posted a 2.01 ERA over 62.2 innings in 12 appearances on the mound.
