= Gerves Fagan =

American baseball player

- Second baseman
- Born: May 12, 1916; Walls, Mississippi, U.S.
- Died: June 18, 1973 (aged 57); Chicago, Illinois, U.S.

Negro league baseball debut
- 1942, for the Jacksonville Red Caps

Last appearance
- 1943, for the Philadelphia Stars
- Stats at Baseball Reference

Teams
- Jacksonville Red Caps (1942); Memphis Red Sox (1942–1943); New York Black Yankees (1943); Harrisburg–St. Louis Stars (1943); Philadelphia Stars (1943)

Gerves Franklin Fagan (May 12, 1916 – June 18, 1973) was an American Negro league baseball second baseman in the 1940s.

A native of Walls, Mississippi, Fagan tied the Major League rookie record for the most teams played for in a single season, appearing in at least one game for four different clubs in 1943 (Note: The other players to do this are Frank Huelsman in 1904, Charles Zomphier in 1927, Alex Crumbley in 1938, and José Bautista in 2004.). He played for Memphis again the following season, and also appeared with the New York Black Yankees, Harrisburg–St. Louis Stars, and Philadelphia Stars Fagan died in Chicago, Illinois in 1973 at age 57.
