= Oscar Boone =

American baseball player (1911-1958)

- Catcher
- Born: March 28, 1911; Cameron, Texas, U.S.
- Died: October 12, 1958 (aged 47); Eloy, Arizona, U.S.
- Batted: Right Threw: Right

Negro league baseball debut
- 1939, for the Atlanta Black Crackers

Last appearance
- 1941, for the Chicago American Giants
- Stats at Baseball Reference

Teams
- Atlanta Black Crackers (1939); Baltimore Elite Giants (1939); Chicago American Giants (1941)

Oscar Boone (March 28, 1911 – October 12, 1958), nicknamed "the San Angelo Sheepherder", was an American professional baseball catcher in the Negro leagues.

A native of Cameron, Texas, Boone played for the Atlanta Black Crackers and Baltimore Elite Giants in 1939 and the Chicago American Giants in 1941. He died in Eloy, Arizona in 1958 at age 47.
