= Horatio Lamar =

American baseball player

- Second baseman
- Born: July 11, 1911; Augusta, Georgia, U.S.
- Died: February 19, 1998 (aged 86); Augusta, Georgia, U.S.
- Batted: Left Threw: Right

Negro league baseball debut
- 1939, for the Indianapolis ABCs

Last appearance
- 1939, for the Indianapolis ABCs

Teams
- Indianapolis ABCs (1939)

Horatio Vincent Lamar (July 11, 1911 – February 19, 1998) was an American Negro league second baseman in the 1930s.

A native of Augusta, Georgia, Lamar attended Morehouse College and played for the Indianapolis ABCs in 1939. He died in Augusta in 1998 at age 86.
