= Leo Sanders =

American baseball player

- Shortstop
- Born: March 10, 1914; Vian, Oklahoma, U.S.
- Died: August 4, 1999 (aged 85); Muskogee, Oklahoma, U.S.
- Threw: Right

Negro league baseball debut
- 1937, for the Memphis Red Sox

Last appearance
- 1942, for the Jacksonville Red Caps

Teams
- Memphis Red Sox (1937); Birmingham Black Barons (1940); Kansas City Monarchs (1940); Jacksonville Red Caps (1942)

Leo N. Sanders (March 10, 1914 – August 4, 1999) was an American Negro league shortstop between 1937 and 1942.

A native of Vian, Oklahoma, Sanders made his Negro leagues debut in 1937 with the Memphis Red Sox. He played for the Birmingham Black Barons and Kansas City Monarchs in 1940, and finished his career with the Jacksonville Red Caps in 1942. Sanders died in Muskogee, Oklahoma in 1999 at age 85.
