= Alex Broome =

American baseball player

- Pitcher
- Born: March 13, 1921; Tampa, Florida, U.S.
- Batted: Unknown Threw: Unknown

Negro league baseball debut
- 1940, for the Cleveland Bears

Last appearance
- 1942, for the Jacksonville Red Caps
- Stats at Baseball Reference

Teams
- Cleveland Bears/Jacksonville Red Caps (1940-1942)

Alexander Rudolph Broome (born March 13, 1921) was an American professional baseball pitcher in the Negro leagues. He played with the Cleveland Bears in 1940 and when they became the Jacksonville Red Caps in 1941 and 1942. He earned the nickname "Satchel" due to his pitch speed, a nod to Satchel Paige.
