= Dan Thomas (outfielder) =

American baseball player

- Outfielder

Negro league baseball debut
- 1939, for the Cleveland Bears

Last appearance
- 1940, for the Birmingham Black Barons
- Stats at Baseball Reference

Teams
- Cleveland Bears (1939); Birmingham Black Barons (1940)

Daniel Thomas is an American former Negro league outfielder who played between 1939 and 1940.

Thomas played for the Cleveland Bears in 1939 and for the Birmingham Black Barons in 1940. In 19 recorded career games, he posted 11 hits and two RBI in 61 plate appearances.
