= Johnny Ray (outfielder) =

American baseball player

- Outfielder
- Born: September 8, 1911; Williamson County, Tennessee, U.S.
- Died: June 28, 1957 (aged 45); Nashville, Tennessee, U.S.
- Batted: Left Threw: Right

Negro league baseball debut
- 1932, for the Montgomery Grey Sox

Last appearance
- 1945, for the Kansas City Monarchs

Teams
- Montgomery Grey Sox (1932); Birmingham Black Barons (1937); Cleveland Bears (1939–1940); Jacksonville Red Caps (1941–1942); Cincinnati Clowns (1943); Indianapolis Clowns (1944–45); Birmingham Black Barons (1945); Kansas City Monarchs (1945)

John Ray (September 8, 1911 – June 28, 1957) was an American Negro league outfielder in the 1930s and 1940s.

A native of Williamson County, Tennessee, Ray made his Negro leagues debut in 1932 for the Montgomery Grey Sox. In his final season, 1945, he played for the Kansas City Monarchs alongside Baseball Hall of Famer Jackie Robinson. Ray died in Nashville, Tennessee in 1957 at age 45.
