= Andy Sarvis =

American baseball player

- Pitcher
- Born: December 22, 1907; Seville, Florida, U.S.
- Died: October 29, 1976 (aged 68); Jacksonville, Florida, U.S.
- Threw: Right

Negro league baseball debut
- 1939, for the Cleveland Bears

Last appearance
- 1944, for the Jacksonville Red Caps

Teams
- Cleveland Bears (1939–1940); Jacksonville Red Caps (1941–1942, 1944)

Andrew Sarvis (December 22, 1907 – October 29, 1976), nicknamed "Smoky", was an American Negro league pitcher between 1939 and 1944.

A native of Seville, Florida, Sarvis made his Negro leagues debut in 1939 for the Cleveland Bears. He went on to play for the Jacksonville Red Caps in 1941, and finished his career with Jacksonville in 1944. Sarvis died in Jacksonville, Florida in 1976 at age 68.
