= Jonathan Hill (baseball) =

- Left fielder/Pitcher
- Batted: Unknown Threw: Unknown

Negro league baseball debut
- 1937, for the Atlanta Black Crackers

Last appearance
- 1937, for the St. Louis Stars
- Stats at Baseball Reference

Teams
- Atlanta Black Crackers (1937); St. Louis Stars (1937)

Jonathan Hill was a professional baseball left fielder and pitcher in the Negro leagues. He played with the Atlanta Black Crackers and St. Louis Stars in 1937.
