= William Dyke (baseball) =

American baseball player

- Second baseman
- Born: August 2, 1906; Bellevue, Virginia
- Died: April 8, 1984 (aged 77); Salem, Virginia
- Threw: Left

Negro league baseball debut
- 1942, for the Jacksonville Red Caps

Last appearance
- 1942, for the Jacksonville Red Caps

Teams
- Jacksonville Red Caps (1942)

William Robert Dyke Jr. (August 2, 1906 – April 8, 1984) was an American Negro league second baseman in the 1940s.

A native of Bellevue, Virginia, Dyke played for the Jacksonville Red Caps in 1942. He died in Salem, Virginia in 1984 at age 77.
