= Jim Williams (outfielder, born 1906) =

American baseball player

- Outfielder
- Born: January 16, 1906; Benton, Alabama, U.S.
- Batted: Right Threw: Right

Negro league baseball debut
- 1931, for the Indianapolis ABCs

Last appearance
- 1944, for the Jacksonville Red Caps
- Managerial record at Baseball Reference

Teams
- Indianapolis ABCs (1931–1933); Homestead Grays (1933–1934); Newark Dodgers (1935); Brooklyn Eagles (1935); New York Black Yankees (1936); Homestead Grays (1937–1939); Toledo Crawfords (1939); Cleveland Bears (1940); New York Black Yankees (1940–1941); New York Cubans (1942); New York Black Yankees (1943–1944); Jacksonville Red Caps (1944)

James Williams (January 16, 1906 – date of death unknown), nicknamed "Big Jim", was an American Negro league baseball outfielder in the 1930s and 1940s.

A native of Benton, Alabama, Williams made his Negro leagues debut in 1931 with the Indianapolis ABCs. He went on to play for several teams, and was selected to play in the 1939 East–West All-Star Game. He finished his career in 1944 with the New York Black Yankees and Jacksonville Red Caps.
