= Don Pelham =

American baseball player

- Outfielder
- Born: April 14, 1908; Hawthorne, Florida, U.S.
- Died: March 28, 1981 (aged 72); Lake County, Florida, U.S.
- Batted: Left Threw: Right

Negro league baseball debut
- 1937, for the Jacksonville Red Caps

Last appearance
- 1938, for the Atlanta Black Crackers

Teams
- Jacksonville Red Caps (1937); Atlanta Black Crackers (1937–1938)

Wilson Donald Pelham (April 14, 1908 – March 28, 1981) was an American Negro league outfielder in the 1930s.

A native of Hawthorne, Florida, Pelham made his Negro leagues debut in 1937 with the Jacksonville Red Caps and the Atlanta Black Crackers. He played again for Atlanta the following season, when he served as acting manager and led the team in home runs. Pelham died in Lake County, Florida in 1981 at age 72.
