= Preacher Henry =

American baseball player (1911–1992)

- Pitcher
- Born: March 10, 1911; Inverness, Florida, U.S.
- Died: May 16, 1992 (aged 81); Jacksonville, Florida, U.S.
- Batted: Right Threw: Right

Negro league baseball debut
- 1937, for the Jacksonville Red Caps

Last appearance
- 1948, for the Indianapolis Clowns
- Stats at Baseball Reference

Teams
- Jacksonville Red Caps (1937–1938); Cleveland Bears (1939–1940); Jacksonville Red Caps (1941–1942); Cincinnati Clowns (1943); Indianapolis Clowns (1946–1948)

Career highlights and awards
- Negro American League strikeout leader (1940)

Leo Henry (March 10, 1911 – May 16, 1992), nicknamed "Preacher", was an American professional baseball pitcher in the 1930s and 1940s in the Negro leagues.

== Career ==
A native of Inverness, Florida, Henry made his Negro leagues debut in 1937 with the Jacksonville Red Caps. He played six seasons with the club as it moved to Cleveland and then back to Jacksonville, and was selected to play in the 1941 East–West All-Star Game. Henry served in the US Army during World War II, and finished his baseball career with the Indianapolis Clowns from 1946 to 1948. He died in Jacksonville, Florida in 1992 at age 81.
