= James Cooper (pitcher) =

American baseball player

- Pitcher
- Born: 1919; St. Louis, Missouri, U.S.
- Batted: Right Threw: Right

Negro league baseball debut
- 1942, for the Cleveland Buckeyes

Last appearance
- 1942, for the Jacksonville Red Caps

Teams
- Cleveland Buckeyes (1942); Jacksonville Red Caps (1942)

James Cooper (born 1919) is an American former Negro league pitcher who played in the 1940s.

A native of St. Louis, Missouri, Cooper played for the Cleveland Buckeyes and the Jacksonville Red Caps in 1942. In four recorded appearances on the mound, he posted a 9.00 ERA over 16 innings.
