= Albert Frazier =

American coach

Biographical details
- Born: January 23, 1915; Jacksonville, Florida, U.S.
- Died: August 18, 1999 (aged 84); Jacksonville, Florida, U.S.

Playing career

Baseball
- 1938: Jacksonville Red Caps
- 1939–1940: Cleveland Bears
- 1944: Jacksonville Red Caps

Coaching career (HC unless noted)

Football
- 1953: Savannah State

Baseball
- 1957–1959: Savannah State
- 1969–1971: Savannah State

Head coaching record
- Overall: 0–8 (football)

Albert Edwin Frazier (January 23, 1915 – August 18, 1999) was an American Negro league baseball player and collegiate American football and baseball coach. He served as the head football coach and baseball coach at Savannah State University in Savannah, Georgia.
