= Clarence Lamar =

American baseball player (1915–1951)

- Shortstop
- Born: March 12, 1915; Montgomery, Alabama, U.S.
- Died: July 15, 1951 (aged 36); Montgomery, Alabama, U.S.
- Batted: Right Threw: Right

Negro league baseball debut
- 1937, for the St. Louis Stars

Last appearance
- 1944, for the Jacksonville Red Caps

Teams
- St. Louis Stars (1937); Birmingham Black Barons (1937); Jacksonville Red Caps (1938); Cleveland Bears (1939–1940); Jacksonville Red Caps (1941–1942); Birmingham Black Barons (1942); Cincinnati Clowns (1943); Jacksonville Red Caps (1944)

Clarence Lamar (March 12, 1915 – July 15, 1951), nicknamed "Lemon", was an American Negro league shortstop who played in the 1930s and 1940s.

A native of Montgomery, Alabama, Lamar made his Negro leagues debut in 1937 with the St. Louis Stars and Birmingham Black Barons. He went on to play for several teams, finishing his career in 1944 with the Jacksonville Red Caps.
