= Charles Zomphier =

American baseball player

- Second baseman
- Born: February 18, 1906; St. Louis, Missouri, U.S.
- Died: January 31, 1973 (aged 66); St. Louis, Missouri, U.S.
- Batted: Right Threw: Right

Negro league baseball debut
- 1926, for the Cleveland Elites

Last appearance
- 1931, for the Cleveland Cubs

Teams
- Cleveland Elites (1926); Cleveland Hornets (1927); St. Louis Stars (1927); Birmingham Black Barons (1927); Cuban Stars (West) (1927); St. Louis Giants (1928); Cleveland Tigers (1928); Memphis Red Sox (1930); Cleveland Cubs (1931)

Charles Zomphier (February 18, 1906 – January 31, 1973) was an American professional baseball second baseman in the Negro leagues. He played from 1927 to 1931 with several teams. After his playing days, he became an umpire in the Negro American League and in semi-pro leagues in the St. Louis, Missouri area.

In 1927, Zomphier tied the Major League rookie record for the most teams played for in a single season, appearing in at least one game for four different clubs (Note: The other players to do this are Frank Huelsman in 1904, Alex Crumbley in 1938, Gerves Fagan in 1943, and José Bautista in 2004.).
