= Lacey Thomas =

American baseball player

- Outfielder
- Born: April 26, 1910; Meridian, Mississippi, U.S.
- Batted: Left Threw: Right

Negro league baseball debut
- 1935, for the Chicago American Giants

Last appearance
- 1944, for the Baltimore Elite Giants

Teams
- Chicago American Giants (1935); Jacksonville Red Caps (1937–1938); Cleveland Bears (1940); Jacksonville Red Caps (1944)

Lacey Thomas (born April 26, 1910) is an American former Negro league outfielder who played in the 1930s and 1940s.

A native of Meridian, Mississippi, Thomas made his Negro leagues debut in 1935 for the Chicago American Giants. He went on to play several seasons for the Jacksonville Red Caps/Cleveland Bears franchise through 1944.
