= Robert Scott (first baseman) =

American baseball player

- First baseman
- Born: 1917

Negro league baseball debut
- 1941, for the Jacksonville Red Caps

Last appearance
- 1941, for the Jacksonville Red Caps

Teams
- Jacksonville Red Caps (1941)

Robert Scott (born 1917) is an American former Negro league first baseman who played in the 1940s.

Scott played for the Jacksonville Red Caps in 1941. In seven recorded games, he posted one hit in 21 plate appearances.
