= Bo Mitchell (baseball) =

American baseball player

- Pitcher
- Born: February 14, 1912
- Died: June 27, 1939 (aged 27); Bessemer, Alabama, U.S.
- Threw: Right

Negro league baseball debut
- 1937, for the Birmingham Black Barons

Last appearance
- 1938, for the Atlanta Black Crackers
- Stats at Baseball Reference

Teams
- Birmingham Black Barons (1937–1938); Atlanta Black Crackers (1938)

Bo Mitchell (February 14, 1912 – June 27, 1939) was an American Negro league pitcher who played in the 1930s.

Mitchell played for the Birmingham Black Barons in 1937, and played for both Birmingham and the Atlanta Black Crackers the following season. In 21 recorded games on the mound, he posted a 4.16 ERA over 125.1 innings.
