= Bub Miller =

American baseball player

- Third baseman

Negro league baseball debut
- 1938, for the Homestead Grays

Last appearance
- 1938, for the Atlanta Black Crackers

Teams
- Homestead Grays (1938); Atlanta Black Crackers (1938)

James "Bub" Miller is an American former Negro league third baseman who played in the 1930s.

Miller played for the Homestead Grays and the Atlanta Black Crackers in 1938. In four recorded games, he posted three hits in 17 plate appearances.
