= Ralph Coles =

Professional baseball player

- Left fielder
- Born: June 26, 1913; Kissimmee, Florida, U.S.
- Died: July 8, 1984 (aged 71); Philadelphia, Pennsylvania, U.S.
- Batted: Both Threw: Right

Negro league baseball debut
- 1939, for the Cleveland Bears

Last appearance
- 1941, for the Jacksonville Red Caps
- Stats at Baseball Reference

Teams
- Cleveland Bears/Jacksonville Red Caps (1939-1941)

Ralph Herman Coles (June 26, 1913 - July 8, 1984) was an American professional baseball left fielder in the Negro leagues. He played with the Cleveland Bears/Jacksonville Red Caps from 1939 to 1941.
