= Willie Ferrell =

American baseball player

- Pitcher
- Born: November 6, 1913; Empire, Alabama, U.S.
- Died: December 18, 1995; Empire, Alabama, U.S.
- Threw: Left

Negro league baseball debut
- 1937, for the Birmingham Black Barons

Last appearance
- 1943, for the Chicago American Giants
- Stats at Baseball Reference

Teams
- Birmingham Black Barons (1937); Jacksonville Red Caps (1938); Cleveland Bears (1939); Homestead Grays (1939–1940); Chicago American Giants (1941–1943)

William O'Neal Ferrell (November 6, 1913 – December 18, 1995), nicknamed "Red", was an American Negro league pitcher who played between 1937 and 1943.

A native of Empire, Alabama, Ferrell made his Negro leagues debut in 1937 with the Birmingham Black Barons. He went on to play with the Jacksonville Red Caps, Cleveland Bears, and Homestead Grays, and finished his career with a three-year stint with the Chicago American Giants from 1941 to 1943.
