= Walter Robinson (baseball) =

American baseball player (1908–1967)

- Infielder
- Born: March 5, 1908; Fernandina Beach, Florida, U.S.
- Died: May 1967 (aged 59); Jacksonville, Florida, U.S.
- Batted: Right Threw: Right

Negro league baseball debut
- 1937, for the Jacksonville Red Caps

Last appearance
- 1944, for the Baltimore Elite Giants

Teams
- Jacksonville Red Caps (1937–1938); Cleveland Bears (1940); Jacksonville Red Caps (1941–1942); Atlanta Black Crackers (1943); New York Black Yankees (1943); Jacksonville Red Caps (1944)

Walter Kenneth Robinson (March 5, 1908 – May 1967), nicknamed "Skin Down", was an American Negro league infielder who played between 1937 and 1944.

A native of Fernandina Beach, Florida, Robinson made his Negro leagues debut in 1937 with the Jacksonville Red Caps. He played with the club through 1942, as it moved to Cleveland and back to Jacksonville. Robinson played for the Atlanta Black Crackers and New York Black Yankees in 1943, and returned to finish his career in Jacksonville in 1944.
