= James Moore (baseball) =

American professional baseball player

- First baseman
- Born: November 18, 1916; Atlanta, Georgia, U.S.
- Died: February 6, 2016 (aged 99); Atlanta, Georgia, U.S.
- Batted: Left Threw: Left

Negro leagues debut
- 1936, for the Newark Eagles

Last Negro leagues appearance
- 1940, for the Baltimore Elite Giants

Negro leagues statistics
- Batting average: .285
- Home runs: 3
- Runs batted in: 82

Teams
- Newark Eagles (1936–1937); Atlanta Black Crackers / Indianapolis ABCs (1938–1939); Baltimore Elite Giants (1939–1940)

James Robert "Red" Moore (November 18, 1916 – February 6, 2016) was an American professional baseball first baseman. Moore was a player in the Negro leagues, appearing with several different teams including his hometown Atlanta Black Crackers. He also served with three different All-Star teams and, in 1938, played with the Southern News Services All-American Negro League Baseball Team.

In 1939, Moore had a batting average of .400, something only 23 other Negro Major League players accomplished. In 2006, he was inducted into the Atlanta Sports Hall of Fame. Listed at 5 feet 11 inches (1.80 m) and 180 pounds (82 kg), he batted and threw left-handed.

== Biography ==
Born in Atlanta, Georgia, Moore began playing baseball professionally after graduating from Booker T. Washington High School in 1933. Over the next six years, Moore moved among the Atlanta Black Crackers, Macon Peaches, Chattanooga Choo-Choos, Schenectady Black Sox, Newark Eagles and Baltimore Elite Giants. He gradually earned a reputation, according to Voices from the Negro Leagues, as perhaps "the best fielding basemen of all time" in his league. Baseball records for his time playing with major Negro league teams (1937–1940) list Moore as accruing a .279 batting average with two home runs and 96 runs batted in. His best offensive season was 1938, when he batted a combined .355 with Atlanta and Newark.

In 1940, after finishing the regular season in Baltimore, Moore played in a winter season in Los Angeles that allowed white and black players to compete against each other, a competition that was first allowed and then halted by Major League Baseball commissioner Kenesaw Mountain Landis. Moore himself believed that the games were halted because the black players were too successful, stating that "The public, they liked to see the competition, but the commissioner, he didn't have that attitude after he found out that we were drawin' real good crowds and we were beatin' 'em a lot."

Moore registered for the military draft in October 1940, and served in the United States Army from 1942 to 1945. After the war, he returned to baseball for three seasons with the minor Negro league Atlanta Black Crackers. At his most highly paid, prior to the war, he earned $250 a month with a $1.50 daily food allowance.

In 2006, Moore was among six individuals inducted into the Atlanta Sports Hall of Fame, in its second year of existence. He died at the age of 99 on February 6, 2016; he was survived by his wife, Mary.

== Sources ==
- Kelley, Brent P. (1998). Voices from the Negro Leagues: Conversations with 52 Baseball Standouts of the Period 1924-1960. McFarland. ISBN 0-7864-2279-3.
