= Tee Mitchell =

American baseball player

- Pitcher
- Born: May 2, 1916; Thomasville, Georgia, U.S.
- Died: November 3, 1970 (aged 54); Atlanta, Georgia, U.S.
- Threw: Right

Negro league baseball debut
- 1939, for the Indianapolis ABCs

Last appearance
- 1939, for the Indianapolis ABCs

Teams
- Indianapolis ABCs (1939)

Lawrence Berry "Tee" Mitchell (May 2, 1916 – November 3, 1970) was an American Negro league pitcher in the 1930s.

A native of Thomasville, Georgia, Mitchell played for the Indianapolis ABCs in 1939. He died in Atlanta, Georgia in 1970 at age 54.
