= Clarence White (baseball) =

American baseball player (1901–??)

- Pitcher
- Born: 1901
- Threw: Left

Negro league baseball debut
- 1928, for the Memphis Red Sox

Last appearance
- 1940, for the Cleveland Bears

Teams
- Memphis Red Sox (1928); Nashville Elite Giants (1929–1930); Louisville Black Caps (1930); Louisville White Sox (1931); Montgomery Grey Sox (1932); Cleveland Bears (1940)

Clarence White (1901 – death unknown), nicknamed "Red", was an American Negro league pitcher from 1928 to 1940.

A native of Tennessee, White made his Negro leagues debut in 1928 with the Memphis Red Sox. He went on to play for the Nashville Elite Giants, Louisville Black Caps, Louisville White Sox, and Montgomery Grey Sox through 1932, and the Cleveland Bears in 1940.
