= Herb Barnhill =

American baseball player (1913–2004)

- Catcher
- Born: July 2, 1913; Hazlehurst, Georgia, U.S.
- Died: July 25, 2004 (aged 91); Jacksonville, Florida, U.S.
- Batted: Right Threw: Right

Negro league baseball debut
- 1938, for the Jacksonville Red Caps

Last appearance
- 1946, for the Chicago American Giants
- Stats at Baseball Reference

Teams
- Jacksonville Red Caps (1938, 1941–1942); Cleveland Bears (1939–1940); Kansas City Monarchs (1943); Chicago American Giants (1944–1946)

Herbert Edward Barnhill (July 2, 1913 – July 25, 2004) was an American professional baseball catcher in the Negro leagues. He played from 1938 to 1946, with the Jacksonville Red Caps, Cleveland Bears, Kansas City Monarchs, and Chicago American Giants.
