= Joe Royal (baseball) =

American baseball player

- Outfielder
- Born: April 9, 1912; Atlanta, Georgia, U.S.
- Died: March 1975 (aged 62)
- Batted: Right Threw: Right

Negro league baseball debut
- 1937, for the Indianapolis Athletics

Last appearance
- 1944, for the Jacksonville Red Caps

Teams
- Indianapolis Athletics (1937); Jacksonville Red Caps (1938, 1942, 1944); Cleveland Bears (1939); New York Black Yankees (1944)

Joseph John Royal, Jr. (April 9, 1912 – March 1975) was an American professional baseball outfielder in the Negro leagues. He played from 1937 to 1944 with several teams.
