= Atlanta Black Crackers =

Black baseball team

- Logo

Information
- League: Independent (1919, 1922–25, 1928, 1930–31, 1933–34, 1937); Negro Southern League (1920–21, 1926–27, 1929, 1932, 1935–36); Negro American League (1938–1939)
- Location: Atlanta, Georgia
- Ballpark: Ponce de Leon Park (1919–1938); Perry Stadium (1939)
- Established: 1919
- Disbanded: 1939
- Nicknames: Atlanta Cubs (1919, 1926); Atlanta Grey Sox (1929); Indianapolis ABCs (1939)

The Atlanta Black Crackers (originally known as the Atlanta Cubs and later briefly the Indianapolis ABCs) were a professional Negro league baseball team which played during the early to mid-20th century. They were primarily a minor Negro league team; however in the brief period they played as a major Negro league team, they won the second half pennant of the Negro American League in 1938 but lost the play-off for the overall season title.

== Beginnings ==
The Atlanta Black Crackers were founded as the Atlanta Cubs as a semiprofessional team of black college students. They began to play independently in 1919 and changed their name to the Black Crackers because fans had already begun to call them by that name. They were named after the local white league team, the Atlanta Crackers, of the Class A Southern Association. It was not unusual for white and Negro league teams to have similar names, but in this case "Cracker" was a term with a complicated history, used sometimes as a colloquial and pejorative nickname for rural southern Whites, but also used affectionately by residents of Florida and Georgia who had long and deep ties to that region.

== League play ==
=== Negro Southern League ===
The Black Crackers joined the minor league Negro Southern League (NSL) in March 1920. Their uniforms, bats, baseballs, and other supplies were donated by their white Southern Association counterpart, the Atlanta Crackers. They were slated to play the 1921 season in the newly formed Negro Southeastern League under the Cubs moniker, however no records have been found of the league playing a season; they instead continued competing as the Black Sox in the NSL.

From 1922 through 1925, the Black Crackers played an independent barnstorming schedule and did not participate in any league play. After taking a two-year hiatus, the NSL re-grouped for the 1926 season and Atlanta was included in the league schedule for 1926 and 1927. When the NSL again went on hiatus in 1928, the Black Crackers returned to barnstorming. In 1929, Atlanta returned to the NSL, this time known as the Grey Sox, however after the season they returned to barnstorming.

By 1932, the Great Depression had decimated the profits of most Negro league teams and only a few organized Negro leagues survived. Atlanta had trouble profiting on their own causing them to go back to playing a league schedule. The NSL was considered the highest quality surviving league and it therefore became the de facto major league for the 1932 season and was the only organized league to complete their full schedule. After the season, the Black Crackers once again played on their own for another two seasons.

W. B. Baker brought Atlanta back to the NSL in 1935 and 1936, but the NSL collapsed for the last time after the 1936 season. Some of its member teams folded as well, but the Black Crackers were invited into the newly organized Negro American League.

The Atlanta Black Crackers left the NSL having a few solid years, but never finishing above the middle of the pack and finishing last in 1926 and 1927.

=== Negro American League ===
After W. B. Baker died suddenly, new owner John H. Harden took over in 1937 barnstorming in the north. Harden put together a talented roster and the team started winning quickly.

In 1938, the Black Crackers were invited to play in a year-old major league, the Negro American League. They went on to have a very strong year, finishing in first place for the second half of the season, but scheduling problems and umpire controversies caused their Pennant series with the first-half champion Memphis Red Sox to be canceled.

Unable to draw sufficient crowds in Atlanta, Harden took the team to Indianapolis following the 1938 season; they played as the fourth team to use the name Indianapolis ABCs. At the conclusion of the 1939 season, the team disbanded due to low attendance.

== Players ==
=== Hall of Famers ===
- Cristóbal Torriente

== Home fields ==
The team played their home games at Ponce de Leon Park, along with the white Atlanta Crackers. However, the Black Crackers were not allowed to play at Ponce de Leon Park when the Crackers had a home game. The Black Crackers were then forced to play at either Morehouse College or Morris Brown College.

== MLB throwback jerseys ==
On June 28, 1997, the Atlanta Braves wore 1938 Black Crackers home uniforms and the visiting Philadelphia Phillies wore 1938 Philadelphia Stars road uniforms. The teams wore these same uniforms again for their matchup on May 14, 2011. On April 27, 2013, the Braves sported Black Crackers throwbacks in a game against the Detroit Tigers. On May 3, 2014, the Braves wore the Black Crackers jerseys in a game against the San Francisco Giants. On June 20, 2015, the Braves again wore the Black Crackers uniform in a game against the New York Mets, who wore the uniform of the Brooklyn Royal Giants to honor the Negro League. On May 15, 2016, the Braves wore Black Crackers away jerseys while playing against the Kansas City Royals, who wore Kansas City Monarchs jerseys. All game-worn gear from this game was auctioned off as a fundraiser for the Negro Leagues Baseball Museum.
