= Jacksonville Red Caps =

American professional baseball team

Information
- League: Negro American League (1938–1942)
- Location: Jacksonville, Florida
- Ballpark: Durkee Field (1938); Hardware Field (1939–1940); Durkee Field (1941–1942)
- Established: 1938
- Disbanded: 1942
- Nickname(s): Jacksonville Red Caps (1938); Cleveland Bears (1939–1940); Jacksonville Red Caps (1941–1942)

The Jacksonville Red Caps were a Negro league baseball team based primarily in Jacksonville, Florida. They played the Negro American League from 1938 until 1942.

== History ==
The team was based in Jacksonville, Florida playing at Durkee Field in 1938. They moved to Cleveland in 1939 and became the Cleveland Bears, playing their home games at Hardware Field. They returned to Jacksonville as the Red Caps in 1941 for two seasons, dropping out of the NAL in July 1942. After the war, the Red Caps apparently continued as an unaffiliated Negro league team playing at Durkee Field.

== League play ==
The Red Caps only played seven league games their first season, finishing 3-4. After transferring to Cleveland in 1939, the Bears (according to Negro leagues historian John Holway) had the best overall record in the NAL but were not awarded the pennant, finishing with a 22-4 record in league play. The Kansas City Monarchs finished with more victories, going 25-13, and, as per the tradition of the time, were thereby declared league champions. Later research shows the Bears with a 20-21 record in 1939, third in the NAL.

The Bears fell hard in 1940, finishing last in the league with a 6-16 record. Returning to Jacksonville, the Red Caps finished second from last with an 8-10 record in league play. They fared no better in 1942 season, going 2-6 before dropping from the league in July.

== MLB throwback jerseys ==
On June 28, 2008, in Pittsburgh, the Tampa Bay Rays and Pittsburgh Pirates honored the Negro leagues by wearing uniforms of the Jacksonville Red Caps and the Pittsburgh Crawfords, respectively, in an interleague game. The Pirates won the game, 4-3 in 13 innings.
