= Gunjin Shōgi =

Japanese board game

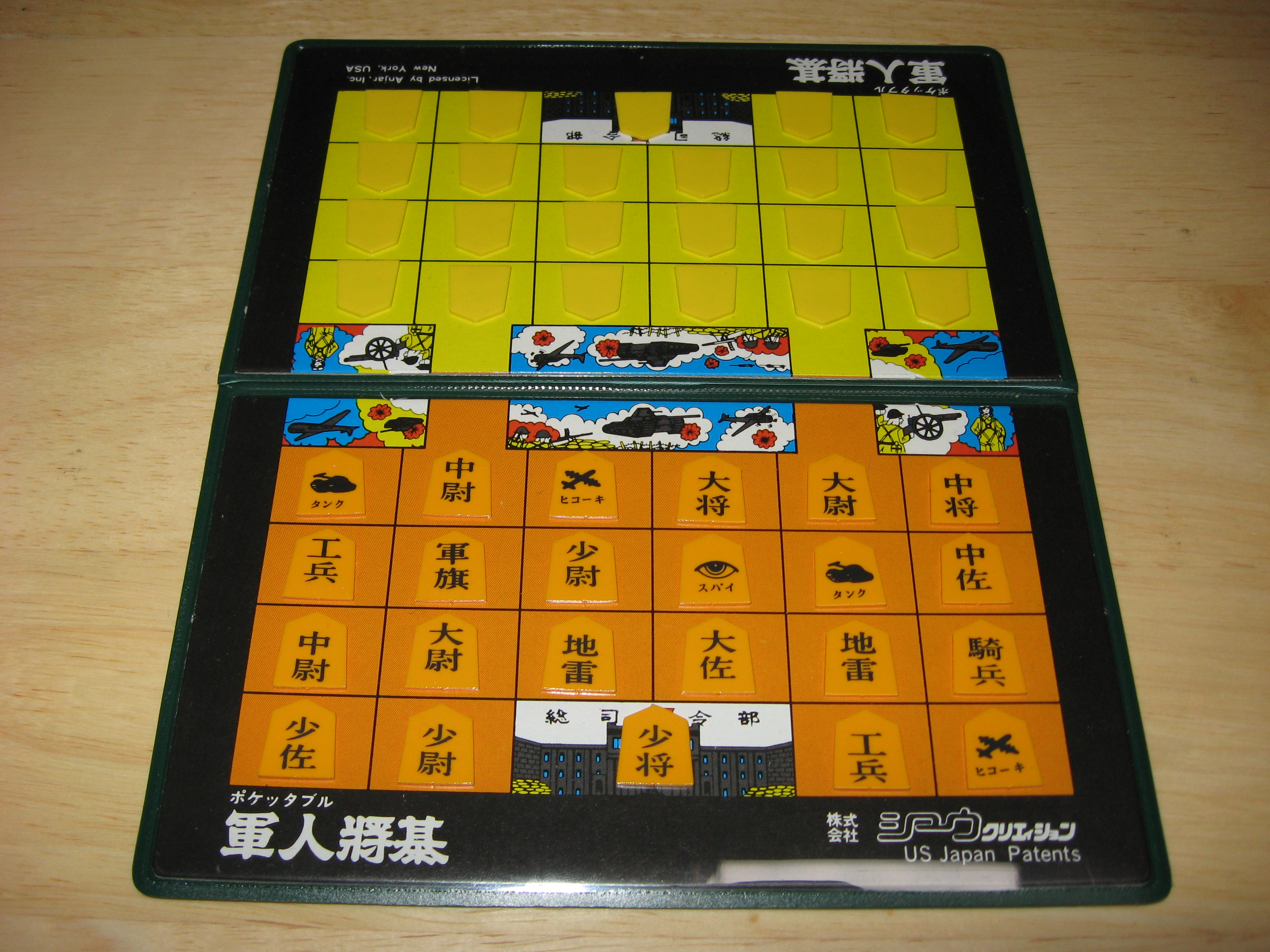
Gunjin Shōgi (23-piece) travel set, with magnetic pieces

Gunjin Shōgi or Japanese Military Chess (軍人将棋), also known as Marching Chess (行軍将棋, Kōgun Shōgi), is a two-player board game, intended for children. Although the pentagonal pieces are shaped like those of Shōgi, the objective is to capture the other player's flag, more similar in gameplay to Stratego (1942) and its antecedent L'Attaque (1908). Both players start with an equal number of pieces in varying strengths; like Stratego and L'Attaque, Gunjin Shōgi is a game of imperfect information, where the placement of the opponent's pieces are hidden initially and must be determined by deduction. It is not known what influence these games, which were developed around the same time, may have had on each other, as there are notable similarities and differences.

== History ==
Gunjin Shōgi has been sold and played since as early as 1895, although it is not known by whom and when it was invented. Dr. Christian Junghans reported this game in Monatshefte magazine in Germany in 1905. It seems, only after reading his article, Julie Berg took out a patent on a war game in London and Paris in 1907. Similarly, Hermance Edan took a patent for the game L'Attaque in 1909 and sold them in 1910; Game historian Michel Boutin asserts Edan was influenced by Gunjin Shōgi; however, papers left by Edan's estate indicate she had invented the game in the 1880s. L'Attaque in turn had a strong influence on Stratego, which was developed by Jacques Johan Mogendorff in the 1940s.

There are multiple versions of Gunjin Shōgi, distinguished by the number of pieces controlled by each player as well as the size of the board. The 23- and 31-piece versions are similar, influenced by the technology of World War I, and the 25-piece version (aka Missile March, ミサイル行軍) is a more recent development, incorporating technologies developed during World War II. Because most commercially available versions of Gunjin Shōgi show these more modern influences, the influence of the original design on L'Attaque, developed pre-WWI, is unclear.

Gunjin Shōgi is well-suited for video game implementation since the computer can take the place of the third-party arbiter without revealing the identity of pieces. Numerous examples exist, although many releases were limited to Japan. A Simple series title was released as Ultimate Mind Games for PlayStation 2 for western markets, which included a Gunjin Shōgi implementation.

== Gameplay ==
6×4 example board (23-piece Gunjin Shōgi)
	A	B	C	D	E	F
8						
7						
6						
5						
—						
4						
3						
2						
1						

Gunjin Shōgi is characterized as a game for children because of its simple rules.

1. Basic gameplay and objective:
  - Players take turns, moving one piece per turn.
  - To win, a player must take the opponent's flag and occupy the opponent's headquarters. Only senior or flag officers may be used to occupy the headquarters.
  - In some variations, occupying the headquarters is sufficient to win; in others, capturing all the opponent's mobile pieces or just the general can be a victory condition.
  - The flag's strength depends on the adjacent piece immediately behind it.
2. Initial setup:
  - Each player's pieces are placed so their identities and starting positions are not visible to their opponent.
  - Mines may not be placed at the entrances or exits to the bridges. For the 6×4 board shown as an example here, that means B4, B5, E4, and E5 may not contain mines.
  - Placing the flag in the last row (closest to the player) means there is no piece that can be placed behind it as reinforcement, making it vulnerable to capture.
3. Movement:
  - Bridges are not considered a separate space, unless indicated on the board. For this 6×4 board example with "I" type bridges, that means that B4 and B5 are adjacent.
  - Most human pieces move one space at a time: forward, backward, right, or left, but not diagonally.
  - Engineers and, in some variants, also the spy, can move an unlimited number of empty spaces in a straight line (not diagonally).
  - Mounted pieces (aerial and ground) are more mobile than most human pieces, with specific rules for movement depending on the variant. Typically, mounted ground units gain one bonus move forward, and aerial units can move forward and backward and jump over occupied spaces.
  - The atomic bomb is stationary unless adjacent to a missile, which can "carry" it.
4. Attack:
  - Two opposing pieces adjacent to each other (not diagonally) may attack. In this example, if it is the orange player's turn, the Lieutenant at B4 could attack the piece at B5, or the Captain at E4 could attack the piece at E5.
  - Pieces with higher strength win the attack and remain on the board. A third-party observer usually is used to judge the results from the attack.
  - The spy is the only piece that can defeat the general. Conversely, the spy is defeated by every other piece.
  - Mines defeat all attackers except the engineer. Regardless of the attacker, after a mine is attacked it is removed from the board.
  - Missiles remove pieces from five spaces (the space where it lands plus the spaces immediately forward, backward, left, and right) unless a "mid-air collision" has occurred, which is when one of those five spaces is occupied by an opponent's missile. In that case, only the two missiles are removed from the board.
  - When the missile is carrying an atomic bomb, the pieces in nine spaces are removed (adding diagonal directions). Again, a "mid-air collision" cancels this, resulting in the removal of both missiles and the atomic bomb.

Since its release, publishers have created many versions of Gunjin Shōgi, which have differing rules, piece counts, and gameboard sizes. All versions have several common features, including a hierarchy of strengths based on military officer ranks, mines and engineers to defuse them, a weak spy able to capture the most powerful general, a headquarters area, and a flag or other stationary object to be captured; despite these, there is a wide variety of mechanized and mounted units (planes, tanks, cavalry, infantry, missiles, atomic bombs) and gameboard layouts.

Gunjin Shōgi variants and pieces
Pieces Name	Strength	23	25	31	Notes
Board size (home area)		6×4	9×3	8×4	Typically has "bridges" over a river, represented by the center of the board, with either straight, X, or Y shapes. Bridges are not counted as a separate row: the squares connected by the bridges are considered to be adjacent to each other. Military headquarters occupy the 2 or 3 squares in the center of the row closest to each player.
Human pieces
Flag officers
General 大将	14	1	1	1	The flag officers can move one adjacent space forward, backward, left, or right.
Lieutenant General 中将	13	1	1	1	The flag officers can move one adjacent space forward, backward, left, or right.
Major General 少将	12	1	1	2	The flag officers can move one adjacent space forward, backward, left, or right.
Senior officers
Colonel 大佐	9	1	2	2	The senior officers can move one adjacent space forward, backward, left, or right.
Lieutenant Colonel 中佐	8	1	2	2	The senior officers can move one adjacent space forward, backward, left, or right.
Major 少佐	7	1	2	2	The senior officers can move one adjacent space forward, backward, left, or right.
Junior officers
Captain 大尉	6	2	0	2	The junior officers can move one adjacent space forward, backward, left, or right.
Lieutenant 中尉	5	2	0	2	The junior officers can move one adjacent space forward, backward, left, or right.
2nd Lieutenant 少尉	4	2	0	2	The junior officers can move one adjacent space forward, backward, left, or right.
Specialists
Engineer 工兵	2	2	3	3	Engineers can move like a rook in chess, over any number of empty squares forward, backwards, left, or right, similar to the scout in L'Attaque and Stratego. They cannot jump over occupied squares.
Spy スパイ	1	1	1	1	The spy can only beat the general. For the 25-piece game, the spy follows the same movement rules as the engineers; for the other games, the spy follows the same one-square movement rules as the general and field officers.
Mounted pieces
Aerial
Plane 飛行機	11	2	0	2	The plane can move forward or backward any number of squares, or move left or right one square. It can jump over other pieces. Planes beat all pieces except flag officers (generals, lieutenant generals, and major generals).
Jet ジェット機	11	0	2	0	In the 25-piece game, the jet can move to any square except to squares occupied by friendly pieces or the opponent's marshal.
Missile ミサイル	—	0	2	0	Movement is similar to the jet, unrestricted except to squares occupied by friendly pieces or the opponent's marshal. By itself, the missile removes all pieces in the four adjacent squares (forwards, backwards, left, and right) from where it fell, unless one of those squares is occupied by an opponent's missile, in which case only the two missiles are removed.
Ground
Tank タンク	10	2	2	3	Tanks follow the same movement rules as Cavalry for the 23- and 31-piece games; for the 25-piece game, they follow the same movement rules as Engineers. Tanks beat all pieces except generals, planes, engineers, and mines.
Cavalry 騎兵	3	1	0	2	Cavalry can move forward two squares in a single turn, or use regular movement rules (one adjacent square). These pieces cannot jump other pieces when moving forward two squares. Cavalry only beat spies and engineers.
Artillery 砲兵	3	0	2	0	Artillery follows the same movement rules as the Engineers.
Stationary pieces
Attack / Defense
Mine 地雷	—	2	2	3	Mines are a single-use item; they are removed after being attacked, along with the attacking piece unless attacked by an engineer. Mines may not be placed at the entrances or exits to bridges. In the 8×6 example board shown, mines cannot be placed at B5, E5, B4, or E4.
Atomic bomb 原爆	—	0	1	0	Immobile unless adjacent to a missile, in which case the pieces can be moved together. When the missile enters the opponent's camp, all pieces in the eight adjacent squares (forwards, backwards, left, right, and diagonally) from the bomb's square are removed, unless one of those squares is occupied by an opponent's missile, in which case only the two missiles and the atomic bomb are removed.
Leaders
Flag 軍旗	varies	1	0	1	The flag's strength is determined by the piece behind it.
Marshal 元帥	—	0	1	0	The marshal is immobile and takes the place of the flag for the 25-piece game. Vulnerable to attack only by a flag or senior officer, and only when there are no adjacent friendly pieces.

=== Boards ===
Hironori Takahashi has documented at least a dozen varieties of game boards; the size and configuration of the player's "home area", where they deploy their pieces, are tied to the total number of pieces per player.

Gunjin Shōgi game board sizes and piece counts
Pieces per player	Deployment area for each player		
Pieces per player	Columns	Rows	Headquarters
35	7	5	1×1
31	8	4	2×1
28	7	4	1x1
26	7	4	3×1
25	5	5	1×1
25	9	3	3×1
23	6	4	2×1
22	7	3	+2×1
21	7	3	1×1
17	9	3	2×1
15	5	3	1×1
10	5	3	1×1

Each game board also features "bridges" connecting the two player deployment areas. The bridges are either straight ("I"), crossed ("X"), or branching ("Y") types, arranged symmetrically from left to right. Some of the X-type bridges have a circular spot in the middle, so a player will enter the bridge on one turn from either one of the two legs, occupying the middle, then on the next turn exit at either one of the two exits.

Diagrams of Gunjin Shōgi boards

Two player areas each 5×3, connected by two "I" bridges spanning B3-B4 and D3-D4

5×5 player areas, two "I" bridges

6×4 player areas, two "I" bridges [23-piece game]

6×4 player areas, two "Y" bridges. A player entering the left bridge at B5 may move to either A4 or B4.

8×4 player areas, two "X" bridges. A player entering the right bridge at F4 may travel to F5 or H5, but not H4.

8×4 player areas, two "X" bridges with center spots [31-piece game]

9×3 player areas, two "X" bridges [25-piece game]

=== Pieces ===
Gunjin Shōgi pieces were made from wood until the late 1980s, when manufacturing was switched over to plastic. It is possible to memorize the grain patterns on the back of the wooden pieces, which makes it difficult to conceal the opponent's initial setup.

Winning table for March Shōgi
(D)efender (A)ttacker	General	Lt General	Mine	Major General	Plane	Tank	Col	Lt Col	Major	Captain	Lieut	2nd Lt	Cavalry	Engineer	Spy
General	AD	A	AD	A	A	A	A	A	A	A	A	A	A	A	D
Lt General	D	AD	AD	A	A	A	A	A	A	A	A	A	A	A	A
Mine	—	—	—	—	—	—	—	—	—	—	—	—	—	—	—
Major General	D	D	AD	AD	A	A	A	A	A	A	A	A	A	A	A
Plane	D	D	A	D	AD	A	A	A	A	A	A	A	A	A	A
Tank	D	D	AD	D	D	AD	A	A	A	A	A	A	A	A	A
Colonel	D	D	AD	D	D	D	AD	A	A	A	A	A	A	A	A
Lt Colonel	D	D	AD	D	D	D	D	AD	A	A	A	A	A	A	A
Major	D	D	AD	D	D	D	D	D	AD	A	A	A	A	A	A
Captain	D	D	AD	D	D	D	D	D	D	AD	A	A	A	A	A
Lieut	D	D	AD	D	D	D	D	D	D	D	AD	A	A	A	A
2nd Lt	D	D	AD	D	D	D	D	D	D	D	D	AD	A	A	A
Cavalry	D	D	AD	D	D	D	D	D	D	D	D	D	AD	A	A
Engineer	D	D	A	D	D	D	D	D	D	D	D	D	D	AD	A
Spy	A	D	AD	D	D	D	D	D	D	D	D	D	D	D	D

Winning table for Missile March Shōgi
(D)efender (A)ttacker	Missile	Atomic Bomb	General	Lieutenant General	Major General	Jet	Tank	Colonel	Lieutenant Colonel	Major	Mine	Artillery	Engineer	Spy	Marshal
Missile	AD	A	A	A	A	A	A	A	A	A	AD	A	A	A	—
Atomic bomb	—	AD	A	A	A	A	A	A	A	A	AD	A	A	A	—
General	D	D	AD	A	A	A	A	A	A	A	AD	A	A	D	X
Lieutenant General	D	D	D	AD	A	A	A	A	A	A	AD	A	A	A	X
Major General	D	D	D	D	AD	A	A	A	A	A	AD	A	A	A	X
Jet	D	D	D	D	D	AD	D	A	A	A	AD	D	A	A	—
Tank	D	D	D	D	D	D	AD	A	A	A	AD	D	D	A	D
Colonel	D	D	D	D	D	D	D	AD	A	A	AD	A	A	A	X
Lieutenant Colonel	D	D	D	D	D	D	D	D	AD	A	AD	A	A	A	X
Major	D	D	D	D	D	D	D	D	D	AD	AD	A	A	A	X
Mine	—	—	—	—	—	—	—	—	—	—	—	—	—	—	—
Artillery	D	D	D	D	D	A	A	D	D	D	A	AD	A	A	D
Engineer	D	D	D	D	D	D	A	D	D	D	A	D	AD	A	D
Spy	D	D	A	D	D	D	D	D	D	D	AD	D	D	D	D
Marshal	—	—	—	—	—	—	—	—	—	—	—	—	—	—	—

Notes

- A = Attacker wins, defender removed from board
- D = Defender wins, attacker removed from board
- AD = Both attacker and defender removed from board
- X = Defender wins if there are still friendly pieces present, otherwise loses

=== Differences with Stratego ===
The main differences between Gunjin Shōgi and Stratego are:

- Gunjin Shōgi needs a referee to resolve the battles of the pieces, which are kept face-down throughout the game.
- The Flag is placed only on the headquarters and a player who successfully occupied the headquarters of the opponent shall win the game.
- There are no Scout pieces. The Engineers and Spy have the same movement as the Scouts in Stratego.
- Only flag and senior officers can occupy the opponent's headquarters.
- Engineer (analog of miner) can remove mines and tanks.
