= Luzhanqi =

Board game

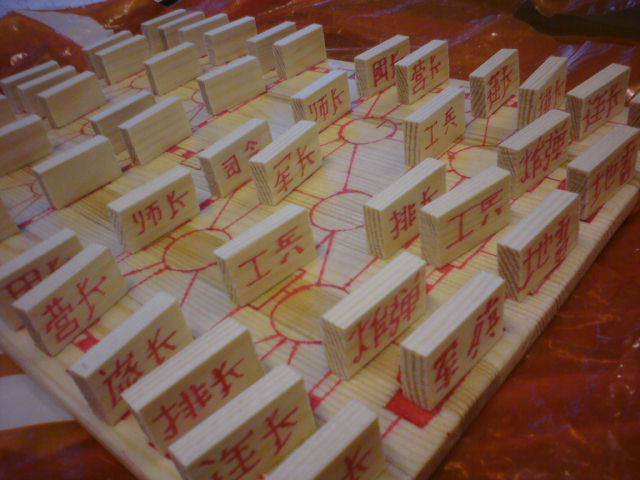
- Players: 2 (3 with a referee)
- Setup time: Under one minute
- Playing time: Informal games: less than 30 minutes.
- Chance: Some, originating to the incomplete information of the game
- Skills: Strategy, tactics, memory, bluff

Chinese military chess (luzhanqi) (Chinese: 陸戰棋; pinyin: lùzhànqí) (lit. “Land Battle Chess”) is a two-player Chinese board game . There is also a version for four players. It bears many similarities to dou shou qi, Game of the Generals and the Western board game Stratego. It is a non-perfect abstract strategy game of partial information, since each player has only limited knowledge concerning the disposition of the opposing pieces. Because of the Chinese nature of the game, terms used within the game may vary in translation.

Luzhanqi is mainly played by children as a precursor to games like xiangqi and weiqi, but people of other ages may also enjoy it as a game of leisure.

== Objective ==
The aim of the game is to capture the opponent's flag through penetrating their defenses, while trying to prevent the opponent from capturing the player's own flag.

== Board ==
Game board

The Luzhanqi board is divided into 65 spaces, which are connected by either roads or railroads to adjacent spaces.

- Roads - usually marked as thin lines on the board. A piece can only travel one space across a road at any time.
- Railroads – usually marked as thick lines on the board, a piece can travel any number of spaces along a railroad in a straight line, as long as its path is not obstructed by another piece.

Each player has 30 spaces in their territory (their side of the board), arranged in five columns and six rows, separated by five special spaces (a single row) from their opponent. Each space has a different shape, depending on whether it is traversable and if pieces can be captured from that space.

Luzhanqi spaces
Name	Shape	Illustration	Quantity	Notes
Post 兵站 Bīngzhàn	rectangle		23(×2)	Also known as Soldier Station; this is a normal space. Pieces can move on or off these spaces at will, and can be attacked and captured on them.
Campsite 行营 Xíngyíng	circle		5(×2)	A piece on a campsite cannot be attacked.
Headquarters 大本营 Dàběnyíng	building		2(×2)	There are two headquarter spaces, positioned to either side of the central axis at the sixth row of the player's territory (closest to the player). The Flag must be placed on one of these two spaces. Any piece that has been placed on or has entered a headquarters space can no longer move.
Mountains 山界 Shān jiè	double circle		2	Pieces cannot move over these two spaces.
Frontlines 前线 Qiánxiàn	square		3	These are the only points at which a piece can enter the opponent's territory. Pieces do not land on these spaces, they pass over them.

== Pieces ==
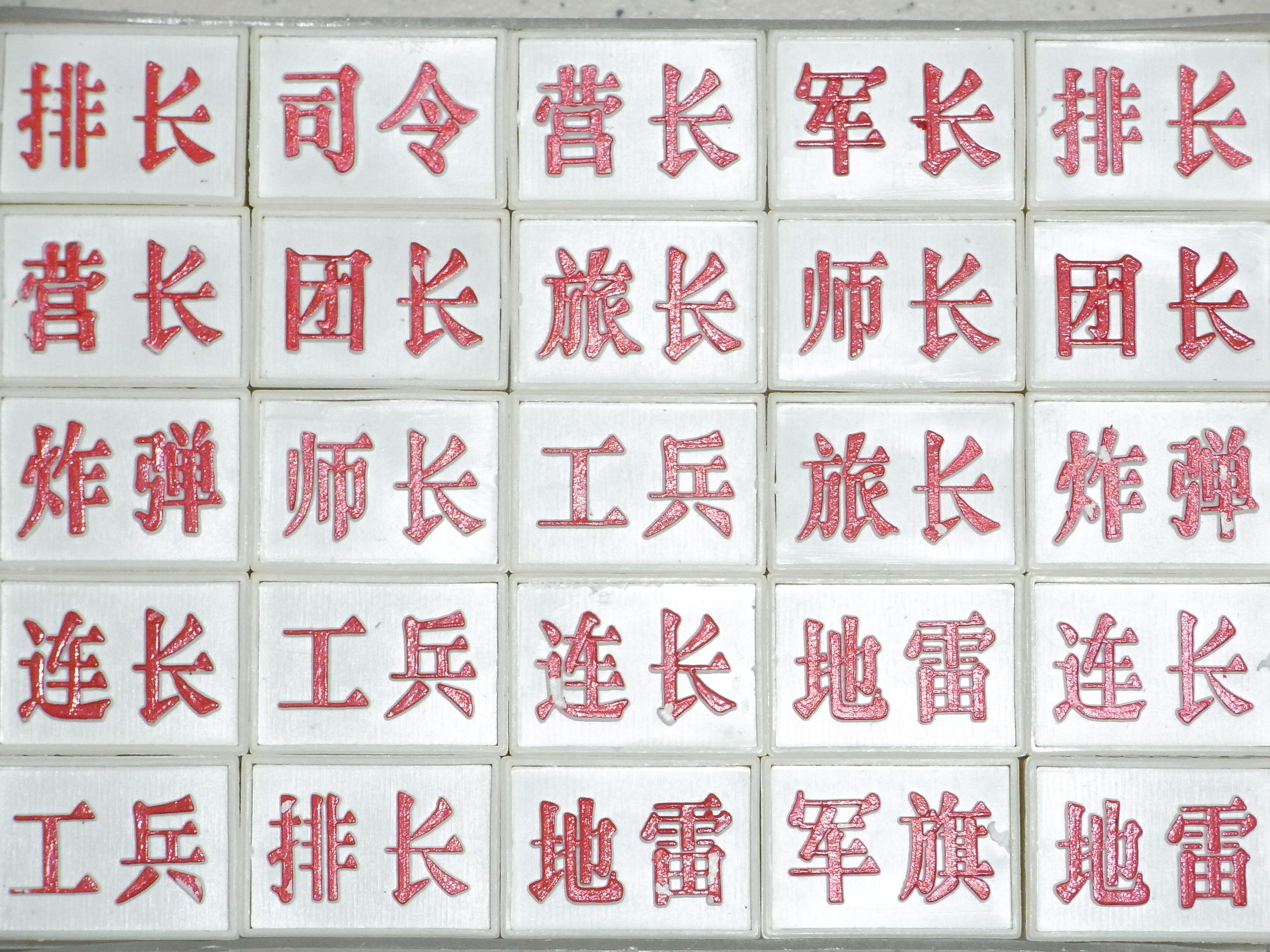
The pieces

Each player has 25 pieces, which are identical except for markings on one side. They are listed here in order of order, where any piece of a higher order may capture one of lower order (if the enemy is of the same order, both pieces will be removed from the board when they fight).

Luzhanqi pieces
Name	Commander	Illustration	Quantity	Order	Notes
Field Marshal 司令 Sī lìng	Overall		1	9	Any player whose Field Marshal is destroyed (by an enemy Field Marshal, Bomb or Landmine) must reveal their Flag.
General 军长 Jūn zhǎng	Field army		1	8	
Major General 师长 Shī zhǎng	Division		2	7	
Brigadier General 旅长 Lǚ zhǎng	Brigade		2	6	
Colonel 团长 Tuán zhǎng	Regiment		2	5	
Major 营长 Yíng zhǎng	Battalion		2	4	
Captain 连长 Lián zhǎng	Company		3	3	
Lieutenant 排长 Pái zhǎng	Platoon		3	2	
Engineer (Sapper) 工兵 Gōngbīng			3	1	The only pieces which can turn corners when travelling along the Railroad. Engineers can also capture (i.e. destroy) Landmines without being removed from the board.
Bomb 炸弹 Zhàdàn			2	—	Unlike the stationary landmine, bombs may be moved. Any attack by (or on) a bomb results in destruction for both the bomb and the opponent's piece. They may capture the opponent's flag. Bombs may not be placed on the front line (the first rank) during the initial set-up.
Landmine 地雷 Dìléi			3	—	Any attack results in the destruction of attacking pieces, except when attacked by an enemy Engineer wherein only the Landmine will be destroyed, or by a Bomb in which both pieces will be destroyed. Depending on the ruleset used, Landmines may or may not be removed from play following a failed attack. Landmines may only be placed on the fifth and sixth ranks during set-up, and may not be moved from their positions during gameplay.
Military Flag 军旗 Jūnqí			1	—	Must be placed on one of the two Headquarters spaces on the sixth rank. It cannot move. Its capture brings the victory of the attacker and ends the game.

== Gameplay ==
Both players begin by arranging their pieces on their half of the board, with the markings that indicate rank facing towards them (and hence invisible to the opponent). Some version allows the pieces to be placed face up, allowing both players to see them. Initially, all pieces must be placed on posts or headquarters; bombs may not be placed on the first rank, landmines must be placed on the last two ranks, and the flag must be placed in one of the headquarters spaces.

Play then proceeds by turns, with each player moving one piece per turn. On each move a piece may move to any connected adjacent space, or use the Railroad lines to travel to more distant spaces.

When a piece lands on a space occupied by an opposing piece, the respective orders of the two pieces are compared (either by the players or by an independent referee). The lower-ordered piece is removed from the board; if the two are of equal order, both are to be removed from the board. Special pieces (see above) also play their respective roles.

As soon as a player's Field Marshal (order 9) is lost (having collided with the opposing Field Marshal, or was destroyed by a bomb or landmine), he must declare so by revealing the headquarters in which his Flag is placed.

When a player attacks his opponent's headquarters, he will win the game if he enters the one with the flag; if he picked the other headquarters, then normal attacking rules apply, and if the attacking piece captures the headquarters piece, it must remain there and not move, revoking its purpose as a piece. However, with this, it becomes obvious to the attacking player that the flag must be planted in the other headquarters. (Some variants do not include this rule.)

== Strategies ==
It is feasible to send the Brigadier Generals or Major Generals (order 6 and 7) to attack the opponent's pieces, for these pieces are effective in getting rid of lower-ordered pieces and identifying those of higher order. Smaller-ordered pieces can be used to infiltrate the opponent's campsites, while Engineers are employed to remove landmines when the route to the opponent's fifth and sixth ranks is clear. Bombs should be sent to campsites as soon as possible to prevent accidental bombing, and should only be employed to destroy the highest-ordered pieces of order 8 and 9, to defend one's own flag from being captured, or to destroy a blocking landmine. The arrangement of landmines and nearby pieces should also be carefully thought out to secure the defense of the headquarters.

== Multi-player versions ==
A typical 4-player Junqi gameboard

One of the main spin-offs of Luzhanqi is Si Guo Zhan Qi (Chinese: 四国戰棋; pinyin: sìguó jūnqí; lit. 'Four Country Battle Chess') derived from arranging a board for four-players, with each taking up a territory adjacent to another at 90-degree angles. Players at opposite ends team up to defend against the other pair; the game ends when both players of a team has their flags captured, or when all sides are unable to defeat each other and thus agree to a draw.

If a player has his flag captured, he must admit defeat, thus removing all of his pieces off the board. He may also do so by resigning if his situation looks hopeless. In this case, if his ally across the board is still in the game, the game continues; otherwise, it ends with the victory of the other team. Even if a player admits defeat or resigns, his team may still win if his ally is able to defeat both opposing teams.

As shown in the diagram, there will no longer be Mountains or No-man's Lands, for the 9 shared spaces in the middle of the territories will be public territory. There are now curved railroads, where the rule for railroads still apply across the curve for all pieces: in a single turn, moving pieces can still travel along any part of the yellow line in the diagram, but not in the direction of the arrow. Engineers are still spared from this restriction and may move to any space accessible via railroads.

Board for six-player variant

A six-player variant also exists, named 六国戰棋; liùguó jūnqí; 'Six Country Battle Chess'. Similar to the four-player variant, it features three teams of two, with each player seated opposite their teammate.

== Other variants ==
There are many variant rules of Junqi. Before a game, players usually decide which rule to use.

=== Common ===
- "Flying Bombs": Under this rule, Bombs move the same way Engineers do.
- "Explosive Mines": Under this rule, An attempt by pieces (other than an Engineer) to capture a Mine kills both the moving piece and the Mine, as opposed to killing only the moving piece. An Engineer still captures a Mine. This rule is more common in 2-players game.

=== Two players ===
- "Flag Carrier": Under this regional variant, games are not won by merely capturing flags. In order to win, a player has to let a piece "take" the flag with it, and carries it back to his/her own flag. A piece carrying the flag moves normally, and if it is captured, the Flag returns to the original headquarters it was in. Also, under this variant, pieces do not become immobile upon entering a headquarters.

=== Four players ===
- "Allied Visible": Under this rule, a player has the right to know his/her ally's piece arrangement, i.e. the rank of all his/her ally's pieces. (In some online games, allied players' pieces are simply made visible to each other.)
- "All Visible": Under this rule, all players place their pieces with their marked side up, that is, making all pieces' rank visible to all players, effectively making it an abstract strategy game of full information.

== See also ==
- Game of the Generals
- Jungle (board game)
- Xiangqi
