= The Generals (game) =

Electronic abstract strategy game

- Other names: The Generals Electronic Strategy Game
- Designers: James R. Becker; Julius Cooper; Fredric M. Kuriloff; Sofronio H. Pasola, Jr.
- Publishers: Ideal Toy Company
- Publication: 1980; 46 years ago
- Genres: Abstract strategy game; Electronic game
- Players: 2
- Playing time: 10 minutes
- Age range: 8+

The Generals, or The Generals Electronic Strategy Game, is an electronic abstract strategy game published in 1980 by Ideal Toy Company. It implements the gameplay of the 1970 game Game of the Generals, in which two players contest control of spaces on a game board by moving game pieces with ranks hidden to their opponent and challenging opposing pieces; the results of challenges are determined by the hierarchy of ranks of those pieces, in a manner similar to Stratego, and decided by an electronic arbiter.

== Gameplay ==
The Generals is played on a 9 by 8 board of squares between a red army and a blue army each consisting of 12 Officers of different ranks, six Privates, two Agents (called "Spies" in Game of the Generals), and a Flag. To start, both players arrange their pieces in any order on the first three rows of the board with the blank sides facing their opponent; this simulates the "fog of war" by hiding the identities of opposing pieces from each player.

Players take turn alternatively, with each moving one piece per turn. All pieces can move one square forward, backwards, or sideways at a time, but cannot move diagonally or into a square already occupied by another piece. A piece moved adjacent to an opposing piece can choose to challenge it, the winner of which is determined by placing both pieces into the electronic arbiter. The weaker piece in the challenge is removed and both are eliminated if both pieces are of equal strength. Higher ranked pieces are stronger than lower ranked pieces, and all pieces except the Private can be eliminated by an Agent. If challenged, the Flag can be eliminated by any opposing piece.

The winner is the player who can either eliminate their opponent's Flag or maneuver their own Flag to the other side of the board without it being eliminated.

=== Electronic arbiter ===
Unlike Game of Generals, The Generals implements an electronic arbiter so that two players do not need a third, neutral observer to determine the result of challenges. The pieces are encoded mechanically with a series of raised dots on the bottom to communicate their rank to the electronic arbiter. Lights on the side of the stronger piece will light up to indicate the winner of the conflict and if flag is placed in the arbiter at the end of the game, it plays Taps.

== Reception ==
Writing for Issue 22 of Games, Sid Sackson described The Generals as a "simple, intriguing battle game," comparing the gameplay to Stratego. Games also featured the game in its 1981 Games 100. The game was praised by Jeux & Stratégie #6 for its presentation and rules clarity.
