= Hermance Edan =

French board game designer (1851–1934)

- Born: Bénédicte Émilie Hermance Cécile Edan; 21 December 1851; Paris, France
- Died: 2 May 1934 (aged 82); Paris, France
- Occupation: Game designer
- Known for: L'Attaque

Hermance Edan (21 December 1851 – 2 May 1934) was a French designer and publisher of board games, active from 1908 until her death in 1934. She is best known for creating and patenting the game L'Attaque, a successful game in its own right and the predecessor to Stratego.

== Biography ==
Hermance Edan was born in Paris on 21 December 1851, daughter of Antoine-Victor Edan (1801-1864), a schoolmaster in Picardy, and his second wife, Louise Cécile Gosse (1815-1902). Through her mother, Edan was the grand-niece of the painter Nicolas Gosse. Through her father, she was the niece of Benoît Edan (1803-1871), a diplomat and first consul of France in Shanghai.

Nothing is known of Hermance Edan's childhood, education or life before 1908, when she applied to the French Patent Office for a patent for a "battle game with mobile pieces on a gameboard". This patent was issued to her the following year. She also filed a patent application in Great Britain for L'Attaque in November 1909. In 1909, she took part in the Concours Lépine, a competition for inventors. There, she exhibited two games, L'Attaque and another game, Vite Au But.

In subsequent years, Edan became a professional creator and publisher of board games, selling her games to department stores through wholesalers. By 1912, she was in business with her brother-in-law (whom she married in 1915, after the death of his wife, Hermance's sister Nelly), under the name of "EDAN and RODHAIN, games, R. d'Alençon 9". In 1915, she submitted a patent application in France for a "Jeu de Bataille navale".

Around 1920, Edan made an agreement with H. P. Gibson and Sons Ltd to distribute its game in the United Kingdom and other Anglophone countries under their original French titles. L'Attaque went on to meet with great success in the United Kingdom. Later, Gibson added variants, including Dover Patrol (a naval variant of L'Attaque) and Aviation (an aerial variant).

Edan's business remained active during the First World War, as she filed at least one patent in 1917. By 1925, her office was located at 3 Avenue du Maine, in the 15th arrondissement of Paris.

Edan's husband died in 1920. Edan herself died on 2 May 1934, at the age of 82, at her home and office on Avenue du Maine in Paris.

== Bibliography ==
- Michel Boutin, “L'Attaque, a French game derived from Gunjin Shogi”, in Art et savoir de l'Inde: Actes du colloque « Jeux indiens et originaires d'Inde » organisés [sic] dans le cadre d’Europalia India, Michel Van Langendonckt, ed, Brussels: HEB, 2015 (Sciences, art and culture, 2), p. 233-268
- Michel Boutin, " De L'Attaque à Stratego », Plato, n° 97, June 2017, p. 56-60.
- Michel Boutin, " Histoire et diffusion d’un jeu japonais 'Gunjin Shogi' et d’un jeu danois 'Polygon-Hex' ", in Farida Sellal, ed., Association «Sauver l’Imzad » – 4ème Rencontre internationale: Recueil de Communications « Pratiques sportives traditionnelles et tourisme culturel durable » – Tamanrasset, from 7 to 12 January 2019, (Tamanrasset): (Association Sauver l’Imzad), nd [2020], p. 17-49.
