= Gibsons Games =

UK board game company

- Type: Private
- Industry: Games
- Founded: 1919; 107 years ago
- Headquarters: United Kingdom
- Website: gibsonsgames.co.uk

Gibsons Games (Gibsons) is an independent, family-owned UK board game and jigsaw puzzle company and one of the oldest in the United Kingdom. Gibsons is the trading name of H. P. Gibson & Sons Ltd. The fourth generation of the Gibsons family now runs the company. The company is headquartered in Sutton, England.

== History ==
=== Early beginnings: International Card Company ===
The company was founded in 1919 by Harry Percy Gibson when he received an unsecured loan of 500 pounds from the Royal Bank of Scotland in Bishopsgate, London. He used this money to buy the International Card Company (ICC), which had originally been founded in Glasgow. Gibson and the ICC were the sole agents for the popular De La Rue playing card brand and supplied retailers with a range of postcards and card games.

=== H. P. Gibson & Sons Ltd. ===
ICC continued to trade during the First World War and was eventually sold to De La Rue in 1919. That same year, Harry Gibson founded H. P. Gibson & Sons Ltd. This new company placed an emphasis on selling card games, similar to the ICC in the past, but also gave Gibson the opportunity to diversify into board games and other novelty products. Some of the games were made directly by the company from printing premises in Aldersgate Street, London, while other products came from external game companies and distributed by H. P. Gibson & Sons. The company made their name with the HPG (H. P. Gibson and Sons) brand of indoor games and were famous for offering 'The Big Four,' a series of military-themed board games that covered all the armed forces: L'Attaque, Dover Patrol, Aviation, and Tri-Tactics. The Big Four were a mainstay of H. P. Gibson & Sons' board games line-up, and by 1939, the company ranked alongside industry leaders such as Waddingtons, Spears, and Chad Valley.

The company continued to thrive during the interwar period with a diverse range of games. In the early 1930s, Harry Percy retired with his sons Robert and Harry Aisbitt took over the running of the company. The company's premises, along with its manufacturing equipment were destroyed during the Blitz, on 30 December 1940. Fresh premises were found and the company re-established trading from Barrett Street in London's West End.

=== Post-WWII ===
After the Second World War, the company focused their attention on wholesale distribution for other games manufacturers, as well as their own family games and pastimes. In 1949, new ranges were introduced, including paddling pools, kites, beach toys, and croquet, to maintain business throughout the year. These products gave representatives a reason to meet sports shop owners, helping the company secure new clients in a booming and consistently strong sector.

=== Michael Gibson, Gibsons Games and the introduction of Uno, diplomacy and jigsaw puzzles ===
In 1966, Harry Percy's grandson Michael Gibson joined the family business. In the early 1970s, with the company facing the prospect of losing wholesale business as their clients began to sell directly to consumers, Michael Gibson suggested that previously discontinued games from Waddingtons could potentially be profitable if they were to be relaunched. H. P. Gibson & Sons Ltd approached Waddingtons, who were receptive to the idea. Soon, H. P. Gibson & Sons were manufacturing and distributing titles such as Risk, Travel Go, Game of Nations, and 4000 AD. The move was a resounding success and became part of the core business strategy.

In 1969, Harry Aisbitt died, followed by Robert Gibson in 1973. Michael Gibson took charge of the company. Within a decade, Michael got rid of the summer range of paddling pools and formalised the evolution of the company by shortening the name to Gibsons Games, taking on the familiar brand identity.

By the mid-1980s, the company had bought their own freehold in Colliers Wood and had an established range of 25 board game titles, including Diplomacy and Wembley, as well as the license for 221b Baker Street, still a best-selling title for the company, and the popular UNO card game which helped to enhance the Gibsons Games brand.

In the late 1980s Gibsons Games released their first jigsaw puzzles, with images of aerial photographs of Britain and familiar landmarks. Fundamentally, the company prided itself on the high-quality jigsaw board, the packaging of the puzzle, and their excellent customer service, as well as pictures that evoked nostalgic memories for puzzle enthusiasts. In 1996, Gibsons Games expanded further with the agreement between themselves and Piatnik, the playing card company. They began to distribute Piatnik playing cards as well as distributing their popular game Pass the Bomb within the UK market.

=== 21st century Gibsons: A family business ===
In the new millennium, Gibsons Games shortened their name again to "Gibsons". Kate Gibson, the daughter of Michael Gibson, joined the team, as did her cousin Nicki Gumbrell. In the first few years of the twenty-first century, almost half of Gibsons' sales came from jigsaw puzzles. In 2024 the proportion is closer to 70%. In 2006, the company moved premises to their current office building in Sutton. The business launched their own direct-to-consumer website in 2019.

Michael Gibson celebrated his 50th anniversary working for Gibsons in 2016, the same year that his daughter Kate took over as Managing Director and Nicki Gumbrell became Sales Director. Kate has placed a new focus on corporate social responsibility as part of the company's strategy of “bringing people together,” which includes supporting many charitable causes and offering work experience to vulnerable young people.

In 2019, Gibsons celebrated its 100th anniversary by relaunching a limited-edition version of L'Attaque, one of the business's first games. This same year, Gibsons expanded their range with the introduction of their design-led White Logo Collection.

In early 2021, Gibsons introduced their Made For You by Gibsons personalised puzzle range. In 2021, Gibsons donated £50,000 to charitable organisations as part of its wider corporate social responsibility initiatives.

== The Gibsons Green Game plan ==
In 2019, Gibsons set up an in-house sustainability team to investigate how they can improve their environmental footprint. One of their main projects was the Perfect Puzzle Project. The company removed the shrink wrap plastic from the outside of their jigsaw puzzles, which are now secured with biodegradable seals. Additionally, Gibsons reduced their puzzle box by almost 30%.

The games in Gibsons' traditional games collection are made from reforested hardwood. These products are also plastic free, as are their Little Gibsons range of puzzles and games.

== Products ==
- Piecing Together Collection – for people living with dementia
- Little Gibsons – for children; plastic-free
- White Logo Collection – for young adults wanting to take a digital detox
- Made For You by Gibsons Personalised Puzzles – available in 1000 or 500 pieces; customers upload their image through the Gibsons website
- Jigsaw Puzzles (mostly hand drawn art, ranging from 2 to 2000 pieces)
- Board Games
  - 221b Baker Street
  - Auto-Go
  - Aviation (aerial version of L'Attaque)
  - Civilization
  - Diplomacy
  - Dover Patrol (naval version of L'Attaque)
  - Hare and Tortoise
  - Ludo
  - L'Attaque
  - Mission Earth
  - Snakes and Ladders
  - Lotto
- Pass the Bomb
- Pass the Pud
- Piatnik Playing Card Range
