= 221B Baker Street (board game) =

Board game featuring Sherlock Holmes

221B Baker Street: The Master Detective Game is a board game featuring Arthur Conan Doyle's fictional detective Sherlock Holmes and developed by Jay Moriarty (dba Antler Productions) in 1975 and sold by the John N. Hansen Co. in the US since 1977. The players have to solve cases using the clues provided by visiting locations on the board such as 221B Baker Street, Scotland Yard, Apothecary and Pawn Broker.

The original game has twenty cases, but there are eight expansion sets of 20 cases each for a total of 180 cases available for play, created through 1986. A new Deluxe Edition of 221 B Baker Street, published by Hansen, has been released in the U.S. in 2016. This Deluxe Edition contains the original 180 cases plus 20 all-new cases for a complete set of 200 cases. The Deluxe Edition also includes all new artwork, board design, and collectible Sherlockian metal tokens. The original game has been licensed for sale in the UK (Gibsons Games), Canada, Australia, New Zealand, Brazil and Romania. Editions of the game published by Gibson have reproduced almost 40 of the 180 cases of the Hansen edition (basically taking from the 20 original cases plus the 20 from the first expansion), but also included 60 new cases for a total of 100. Their recent 2014 edition has 75 cases taken from their 100. The Brazilian version is titled Scotland Yard and translated in Portuguese.

A sequel game, 221 B Baker Street: Sherlock Holmes and the Time Machine came out around 1996, in which players travel back in time to solve real and infamous cases throughout the 20th century, but is no longer published in the U.S. However, a Time Machine version of the game has been released in Brazil (2016–17) titled Scotland Yard: Sherlock Holmes & The Time Machine and features 40 cases.

== Gameplay ==
Before the game starts, a case is selected, and one player reads the case file. This fills in the players on the background of the case as well as lists the location of each clue in the case booklet. A place may provide no clue, or only a part of one. Clues may also be entirely irrelevant or throw a player off entirely. Clues often are in the form of a riddle, especially multi-part clues.

Play begins with each player at the Start square in the corner of the board, from which the players visit each of the 14 locations on the board. Movement is decided by the throw of a single die.

Upon entering a location, the player may read the back of the card containing the case. This consists of a list of locations and a number assigned to each one. The player may then secretly read the relevant paragraph in the back of the rulebook, which is the clue. (The numbers are mixed up, so two adjacent numbers in the book are unlikely to be from the same case.)

Each paragraph may or may not contain evidence of note, and the clue may be cryptic. A time limit to read the clue is recommended, after which the book must be closed and the play passed to the next player. If a person wishes more time (or needs to check again), then he must stay for an extra move (or return to the location if previously vacated) to get another attempt. Allowing some players (e.g., children playing) more time than others is not unknown.

If the player believes that they know the solution to the case, they may return to the starting point. Upon returning to the starting point, the player must announce (publicly) the essentials of the crime: typically the culprit, the weapon used, and the motive. Some cases (scenarios) may require other items to be revealed—e.g., culprit, motive, location of stolen items. This is outlined in the case introduction. Having read aloud their solution, they inspect the rulebook and look up the entry given for the correct solution. If correct, they must read it aloud to confirm. If not, they stay silent except to announce their failure and are excluded from the game. It is possible for all players to be excluded.

Three additional 'twists' (or tactics) are available. The Carriage Depot (one of the locations) can also be used to move immediately to any point on the board, in which case they cannot view the clue, although they may view the clue, then wait for their next turn before taking a carriage. Also, each player begins the game with two markers: one is a key and the other a warrant. Upon leaving a location, the player may use their warrant to bar access to all other players, who must expend their own key card to remove it. Only one of each card may be held by a player at one time, although replacements may be gained by visiting Scotland Yard or the Locksmith's (both locations with clues). 221B, Scotland Yard and the Locksmith's may not themselves be sealed with a warrant. A warrant can be used to obstruct other players to locations with helpful clues or placed in locations with useless clues to convince other players that such a location is useful.

== Format of Clues ==
Clues come in three basic forms:

- No Clue. Literally as stated.
- Descriptive: e.g., "Mr. Fowler, the Baker's assistant, was seen arguing with Mrs. Turnbuckle (the victim) earlier that evening about his unpaid rent." or "Holmes reasons that a petty pickpocket, such as Hobson, would not by himself know how to break a bank safe." This may or may not be relevant. In the case of the latter, it points either to an accomplice (who also must be identified in the solution), or that Hobbs has otherwise unknown skills or that Hobbs is not involved. In the case of the former, it may reveal both the killer and potential motive (Fowler killed Mrs. Turnbuckle over unpaid rent), or it might be simple coincidence. Another possibility might be: "Although everyone heard three shots, only one chamber in the revolver found at the scene had been expended." This (more indirect clue) would need careful consideration. Was there more than 1 weapon? Or had the weapon been reloaded? If reloaded, then by whom and when? And in either result, what does this mean for the case?
- Weapon/Killer/Motive Clue: e.g., "Motive Clue (3 Parts): I – Extremely Cold". In this case the clue is assembled like a game of charades, forming syllables, words, or phrases from clues which must be assembled. The full sentence composed of all its parts will often then be a cryptic statement pointing to the solution or a literal spelling of the solution. For example, a two-part killer clue might spell the offender's name. The 'I' at the beginning of the example given indicates this is the first syllable/word/fragment of a phrase that contains three fragments. The other two will be in other locations.

== Locations ==
- 221B Baker Street (Start/End Location, never any clues associated.)
- Chemist
- Bank
- Carriage Depot
- Docks (can be accessed from two points, of which one must remain unsealed.)
- Hotel
- Locksmith (provides new keys, cannot be sealed)
- Museum
- Newsagent's
- Park (3 Entrance paths, one must remain unsealed.)
- Pawnbroker
- Theater
- Boar's Head
- Tobacconist
- Scotland Yard (replaces used warrants, cannot be blocked by one.)

The two locations with multiple entrance/exit positions can be used to gain a short-cut. The player must stop upon entering (viewing the clue or not) but can leave one turn later. In the case of a 'race to the end' (two players making all the way to reach 221B first to announce their solution) this is invaluable in the case of the Park as it occupies a whole stretch of the board and one end is directly adjacent to 221B. With average die rolls, it would take 6 moves to move the whole length of the park by normal means rather than the two used by moving through it. The carriage depot (should it be closer) is also invaluable in this 'race to the end' situation. In the new Deluxe Edition, a new board is used, and the park and carriage depot have been moved, eliminating this technique

== Additional notes on Tactics ==
Many novice players begin at 221B and then progress across the board. Another tactic is to move to the Park (directly adjacent to 221B), read the clue, and then move (due to the large size of the park location) to the carriage depot. Upon reading the clue at the depot, take a carriage to the docks (the furthest point from 221B) or a nearby location to the docks. In that way the player works 'backwards' across the board (back towards 221B rather than away from it), and so after gaining many clues will be closer to 221B than a player who worked from 221B outwards (and so might be the opposite side of the board – and hence the furthest distance from the 'end' at 221B when enough clues are read to provide the solution.)

== Expansion Sets ==
8 expansion sets with additional cases are published, numbered from 2 to 9. They can be purchased separately or are all available in the new Deluxe edition, which includes the complete set of 180 cases, plus 20 more. A ninth set has now been published with the 20 new cases.

== Reception ==
In the January 1990 edition of Games International (Issue 12), Kevin Jacklin thought that "the system generally works well, although sometimes the choice of location for certain clues appears to be random." Jacklin wasn't sure about the evenness of play, noting that "the quality of the cases is variable." He concluded, "Despite occasional errors and misprinted clues, the atmosphere is good, and several cases may be played in an evening."

In a retrospective review of 221B Baker Street in Black Gate, Bob Byrne said "Overall, 221B is a decent game. I think its strength is in its lack of complexity, and it is a good Holmes-themed game to play with kids."

== Reviews ==
- Games # 145 (Vol 22, #3) 1998 June – Sherlock Holmes and the Time Machine
- 1980 Games 100 in Games
- 1981 Games 100 in Games
- 1982 Games 100 in Games
- Jeux & Stratégie No. 25
- The Playboy Winner's Guide to Board Games
- 221B Baker Street Board Game Review | Tabletok Games
