= Game of the Generals =

Filipino board game

- Box cover of the 1981 version
- Publishers: Sofronio H. Pasola Jr.
- Publication: 1970; 56 years ago
- Genres: Board game
- Players: 1 versus 1, plus an optional arbiter or referee
- Setup time: 2 to 3 minutes
- Playing time: 30 to 120 minutes (player-dependent)
- Chance: Yes
- Age range: All ages
- Skills: Memory; bluffing; inter-player communication; strategy

Game of the Generals, also called GG or GOG or simply The Generals, is an educational war game invented in the Philippines by Sofronio H. Pasola Jr. in 1970. Its Filipino name is "Salpakan." It can be played in twenty to thirty minutes. It is designed for two players, each controlling an army, and a neutral Arbiter (sometimes called a Referee or an Adjutant) to decide the results of "challenges" between opposing playing pieces that have their identities hidden from the opponent.

The game simulates armies at war trying to overpower, misinform, outflank, outmaneuver and destroy each other. It optimizes using logic, memory, and spatial skills. It simulates the "fog of war" because the identities of the opposing pieces are hidden from each player and can only be guessed at by their location, movements, or from the results of challenges. The game allows only one side's plan to succeed, although a player may change plans during the game. There are two different ways of winning the game (see below). Certain strategies and tactics, however, allow both sides the chance of securing a better idea of the other's plan as the game progresses. Players can also speak or gesture to their opponents during matches, to create a false impression about the identity of their pieces or their overall strategy.

The game bears many similarities to the earlier games L'Attaque and Stratego.

== History ==
Sofronio H. Pasola, Jr. invented this game with the inspiration of his son Ronnie Pasola.

The Pasolas first tried the Game of the Generals on a chessboard. Even then, the pieces had no particular arrangement. There were no spies in the experimental game; but after Ronnie Pasola remembered the James Bond movies and Mata Hari, he added the Spies. The Pasolas also decided to make the pieces hidden, after remembering card games.

The Game of the Generals' was released publicly on 28 February 1973. After the game was released, it angered some Filipino chess players who thought that Pasola was trying to denigrate chess.

== Objectives and victory conditions ==
The game's objective is to eliminate or capture the opponent's Flag or to maneuver one's Flag to the far edge of the board, subject to the following conditions.

If challenged, the Flag is eliminated by any opposing piece, including the opposing and challenging Flag. If a player's Flag is eliminated by a challenge, that player loses the game. The Flag that challenges the opponent's Flag wins the challenge and thus wins the game.

When the Flag successfully reaches the opponent's back rank, it has to survive one more turn without being challenged before it can declare a victory. If a Flag reaches the opposing back rank and there is no adjacent opposing piece that can challenge it, the Flag wins the game immediately. If a Flag reaches the opposing back rank directly adjacent to an opposing piece, and that piece does not challenge the Flag immediately on the opponent's next turn, then that Flag wins the game. Any player may reveal their Flag at any time and for any reason, although most often a player reveals their Flag after it has already secured victory at the opposing back rank.

Most games end in a victory for one of the players. However, any player may propose a draw at any time; the opponent can either decline, so play continues, or agree, and thus the game ends in a tie.

At the end of a match, whether as a draw or as a victory for one player, it is courteous to allow the opposing player a view of the surviving pieces before they are taken off the board.

== Equipment ==
=== Pieces ===
The player's set of pieces represents 21 soldiers (combatants) with a hierarchy of ranks and functions. A higher-ranking piece (usually the officers) will eliminate any lower-ranking piece, with the exception of the two Spies; the Spies eliminate all pieces except the 6 Privates.

Apart from the Flag (the Philippine Flag) and the Spy (a pair of prying eyes), the rank insignia of the pieces used in the game are those used in the Philippine Army.

The playing pieces are identical-sized plastic or metal flat rectangles bent or molded at a 90-degree- or 80-degree angles. The rank insignia are printed on the rear side to keep them hidden from the opposing player; the game requires that the front side of the pieces should have no distinguishing marks that will help identify the pieces.

In plastic sets, the colors commonly used in the pieces are black and white. There are also sets composed of wooden boards and aluminum pieces. Those pieces have rank insignia that are printed either red or blue. In metal sets, the board's color is commonly brown and the pieces are aluminum colored. Some of the cheaper game sets consist of just a rolled up sheet printed with squares instead of a rigid board, as well as plastic pieces with ranks printed on cardboard.

Pieces	No. of Pieces	Function
General of the Army (Five Stars) = 5*G	1	Eliminates any lower-ranking officer, the Private, and the Flag.
General (Four Stars) = 4*G	1	Eliminates any lower-ranking officer, the Private, and the Flag.
Lieutenant General (Three Stars) = 3*G	1	Eliminates any lower-ranking officer, the Private, and the Flag.
Major General (Two Stars) = 2*G	1	Eliminates any lower-ranking officer, the Private, and the Flag.
Brigadier General (One Star) = 1*G	1	Eliminates any lower-ranking officer, the Private, and the Flag.
Colonel (Three Magdalo 7-Ray Suns) = COL	1	Eliminates any lower-ranking officer, the Private, and the Flag.
Lieutenant Colonel (Two Magdalo 7-Ray Suns) = LTC	1	Eliminates any lower-ranking officer, the Private, and the Flag.
Major (One Magdalo 7-Ray Sun) = MAJ	1	Eliminates any lower-ranking officer, the Private, and the Flag.
Captain (Three Magdalo Triangles) = CPT	1	Eliminates any lower-ranking officer, the Private, and the Flag.
1st Lieutenant (Two Magdalo Triangles) = 1LT	1	Eliminates any lower-ranking officer, the Private, and the Flag.
2nd Lieutenant (One Magdalo Triangle) = 2LT	1	Eliminates the Sergeant, the Private, and the Flag.
Sergeant (Three Chevrons) = SGT	1	Eliminates the Private, and the Flag.
Private (One Chevron) = PVT	6	Eliminates the Spy, and the Flag.
Spy (Two Prying Eyes) = SPY	2	Eliminates all officers from the rank of Sergeant up to 5-Star General and the Flag.
Flag (Philippine Flag) = FLG	1	Eliminates the opposing Flag as long as it takes the aggressive action against the enemy Flag.

Note: If both soldiers are of equal rank, both are eliminated (colloquially termed as a "split").

=== Board ===
	A	B	C	D	E	F	G	H	I	
8				3*G	FLG	SGT				8
7	1*G	2*G	SPY	LTC	PVT	1LT	SPY	CPT	MAJ	7
6	2LT	PVT	PVT	4*G	PVT	5*G	PVT	PVT	COL	6
5										5
4										4
3	3*G			PVT	LTC	5*G	PVT			3
2		1LT	SPY	CPT	SGT	PVT		4*G	SPY	2
1	2LT	MAJ	COL	PVT	PVT	FLG	1*G	2*G	PVT	1
	A	B	C	D	E	F	G	H	I	

The game is played on a rectangular board with 72 plain squares arranged in 8 horizontal ranks and 9 vertical files. To start the game, each player's 21 pieces are placed in various locations within the nearest 3 rows to each player's home side. These are the 27 closest squares, leaving 6 squares unoccupied. For example, the Black player in the illustrated example has deployed 21 pieces in Ranks 6, 7, and 8, leaving the squares A8, B8, C8, G8, H8, and I8 unoccupied. The White player has also deployed 21 pieces in the nearest 3 Ranks (1, 2, and 3), leaving A2, B3, C3, G2, H3, and I3 unoccupied.

A player can consider the half of the board nearest him to be "friendly territory" while the other side's half is the "enemy territory," though this is not an actual rule in the game. The two middle rows (fourth rank from each player's edge of the board) are initially empty at the start of the game and represent "no man's land" or "unconquered territory" that the contending pieces can occupy or leave vacant, depending on each player's strategy.

Although not specifically marked, each player's side of the board can be grouped into three amorphous battle zones, generally consisting of nine squares each: these zones are the "left flank," the "center," and the "right flank," but the boundaries are variable or may be considered psychological.

==== Initial layout ====
Unlike chess or its variants, there is no predetermined initial layout for placing the pieces, allowing each player to place the pieces in different squares to their preference or according to their initial strategy. Some players like to place the spaces (unoccupied squares) at the rear row, the front row, to one side of the board, or interspersed between the pieces, but that initial placement can be a form of deception to try to mislead the opposing player.

The allocation of spaces (6 vacant squares) is important for the tactical movement of the individual pieces in the first three ranks, because a piece that has friendly pieces in front, behind, and on each side is effectively immobilized until a space opens up on these adjacent squares.

== Basic gameplay ==
=== Moves ===
There is also no predetermined order of play. The players can decide who goes first; afterward, they take their turns alternately. Each player can move only one piece per turn.

All pieces have the same move: one square forward, backward, or sideways, as long as it is not blocked by the board's edge or by another friendly piece. A piece cannot move into a square already occupied by a friendly piece. A piece cannot move diagonally nor move two or more squares away from its original position.

If a piece moves adjacent to (in front of, behind, or to the side of, but not diagonally from) an opposing piece, the piece that was stationary can be moved to *challenge* the opposing piece by entering and occupying the adjacent enemy-occupied square.

For the result of the challenge, a neutral Arbiter examines both pieces and removes (eliminates) the lower-ranking piece without showing the winning player the identity of that eliminated losing piece. If the two opposing pieces are of equal rank, both pieces are eliminated (called a "split") and the square they were on becomes unoccupied.

=== Challenges, maneuvering, and arbitration ===
Each piece can "challenge" an opposing piece directly adjacent in front, behind, or to either side of it. This is identical, in effect, to the way it moves. Thus, a piece does not directly threaten an opposing piece that is situated diagonally to it. However, a piece known or thought to be more assertive can restrict the movement of a weaker opposing piece that is situated diagonally to it by threatening to eliminate it if it moves to a square adjacent to that of the stronger piece.

A player can prevent or evade a challenge by moving his threatened piece to a square away from or diagonal to an adjacent enemy piece. This can result in a chase of the evading piece over various squares of the playing area as an assertive player tries to threaten the evading piece with elimination.

On any subsequent turn, an aggressive player can decide to restrict or trap an evading enemy piece by moving another of his pieces to a square diagonal to the enemy piece. It might be necessary for that aggressive player to force the evading enemy piece to the edge of the board or adjacent to another enemy piece to immobilize it. When the trapped enemy piece is moved to a square already threatened by (directly adjacent to) one of the entrapping pieces, it can then be challenged.

A player initiates a challenge by placing their piece on the adjacent square where an opposing piece is located.

The following table shows all the possible results of a challenge between two opposing pieces. One or both of them may be eliminated.

Challenge arbitration (Note: The intersection of row and column indicates what happens when the two listed pieces challenge each other.: The Yes (green check mark) indicates the White piece (listed in the leftmost column) is removed and the Black piece (listed in the topmost row) is retained.; The No (red x mark) indicates the White piece is retained and the Black piece is removed.; "Both" means both pieces are removed.; "Ch." means the challenger is retained, and the challenged piece is removed.)
	5*G	4*G	3*G	2*G	1*G	COL	LTC	MAJ	CPT	1LT	2LT	SGT	PVT	SPY	FLG
5*G	Both	No	No	No	No	No	No	No	No	No	No	No	No	Yes	No
4*G	Yes	Both	No	No	No	No	No	No	No	No	No	No	No	Yes	No
3*G	Yes	Yes	Both	No	No	No	No	No	No	No	No	No	No	Yes	No
2*G	Yes	Yes	Yes	Both	No	No	No	No	No	No	No	No	No	Yes	No
1*G	Yes	Yes	Yes	Yes	Both	No	No	No	No	No	No	No	No	Yes	No
COL	Yes	Yes	Yes	Yes	Yes	Both	No	No	No	No	No	No	No	Yes	No
LTC	Yes	Yes	Yes	Yes	Yes	Yes	Both	No	No	No	No	No	No	Yes	No
MAJ	Yes	Yes	Yes	Yes	Yes	Yes	Yes	Both	No	No	No	No	No	Yes	No
CPT	Yes	Yes	Yes	Yes	Yes	Yes	Yes	Yes	Both	No	No	No	No	Yes	No
1LT	Yes	Yes	Yes	Yes	Yes	Yes	Yes	Yes	Yes	Both	No	No	No	Yes	No
2LT	Yes	Yes	Yes	Yes	Yes	Yes	Yes	Yes	Yes	Yes	Both	No	No	Yes	No
SGT	Yes	Yes	Yes	Yes	Yes	Yes	Yes	Yes	Yes	Yes	Yes	Both	No	Yes	No
PVT	Yes	Yes	Yes	Yes	Yes	Yes	Yes	Yes	Yes	Yes	Yes	Yes	Both	No	No
SPY	No	No	No	No	No	No	No	No	No	No	No	No	Yes	Both	No
FLG	Yes	Yes	Yes	Yes	Yes	Yes	Yes	Yes	Yes	Yes	Yes	Yes	Yes	Yes	Ch.

Notes

The Arbiter then examines the ranks of the opposing pieces, removes the lower-ranked piece off the board, and returns it to the owner regardless of who initiated the challenge. The eliminated pieces are not revealed to the opposing player until the game ends. The Arbiter must not reveal the ranks of the pieces to the opposition, nor can he give any verbal or non-verbal clues about the rest of the board layout.

The game can be played without an Arbiter. In this case, when a challenge is made, both players must state the rank of their piece after which the lower-ranked piece is eliminated. The presence of the Arbiter, though not compulsory, is significant to ensure secrecy until the game is over. Official games are conducted with an Arbiter.

=== Determining the results of a challenge ===
Regardless of which piece initiated the challenge, their ranks determine which piece is to be eliminated and removed from the board.

- Any one of the player's pieces can challenge and eliminate the opposing Flag [FLG]. This includes the player's own Flag.
- Any piece, except the Spy [SPY] and the Flag [FLG], eliminates the Private [PVT].
- Officers eliminate other officers that are lower in rank (e.g., a Four-Star General [4*G] eliminates a Lieutenant Colonel [LTC]).
- A Spy eliminates all officers (including the Five-Star General [5*G]). Only the Private [PVT] can eliminate the Spy [SPY].
- If both pieces are of the same rank, both are removed from the board (often called a "split" by most players and Arbiters).
- If a Flag challenges the opponent's Flag, the challenging Flag prevails and wins the game.

If a Flag [FLG] reaches the opposite edge or farthest rank of the board, the opponent has one turn left although it is not announced. After the turn, the player who advanced his Flag waits for the next player to make his move and afterwards, he reveals his Flag.

If the advanced Flag was not challenged, the player with the advanced Flag wins the game.

If any Flag is challenged by any piece, the player with that challenged Flag loses the game.

== Application of warfare concepts to the game ==
=== Combatant roles of the pieces ===
The playing pieces can be classified according to the following tactical functions and roles:

- Spies - The two Spies [SPY] defends other pieces against Killers and then other officers.
- Killers - The Five-Star [5*G] and Four-Star [4*G] Generals, which are the four most-powerful pieces, have the critical job of eliminating the enemy Sweepers and all other pieces, either by aggressive challenging or ambush, to gain a power-level, numerical, or positional advantage against the opponent.
- Sweepers - The five next-most-powerful officers (Three-Star General [3*G] down to the Major [MAJ]) will take over the Killer function if the Five-Star and Four-Star Generals are eliminated. Their main job is to remove all lower-ranking enemy officers and Privates to be able to acquire and retain a numerical or positional advantage of friendly pieces over the enemy.
- Probers - These are five "sacrificial" junior officers from the Captain [CAP] down to the Sergeant [SGT]. Their job is to challenge untested enemy pieces and determine their power so they can either be avoided, ambushed, or targeted for elimination by the Killers or Privates. By eliminating Privates, Probers often act as bodyguards to the Spies and the Flag.
- Privates - The main job of the six Privates [PVT] is to eliminate the Spies [SPY] (in the opening and middle game) and the Flag [FLG] (in the end game). They usually accompany the highest-ranking officers in order to eliminate the Spy [SPY] that targets the officers. While they can be considered sacrificial, once there are only one or two Privates left, it becomes very difficult to eliminate the Spies.
- Flag - The Flag [FLG] is the only piece that can win victory and must be hidden and protected at all costs, even when it has an unobstructed way to the far edge of the board; then it can go for broke. Often, a Private [PVT] or low-ranking officer is made to act like a scared Flag to deceive the opponent. Sometimes a Flag can try to move as if it was a mid-level or low-ranking officer, or as a Private, to avoid being challenged by another piece.

Note: The roles of the Sweepers and Probers can be interchanged in various ways, depending on the player's tactical preference. For deception purposes, an experienced Generals player may make side comments or move individual pieces as if they were scared, passive, evasive, active, assertive, or aggressive in order to distract, deceive, deflect, entrap, ambush, or outsmart an opponent.

Psychological tactics, but not including offensive or discourteous trash talk, are part of the face-to-face game. Most electronic or software versions of this game reduce or disregard this psychological element.

=== Common strategies and tactics ===
An experienced Generals player will have tried out and practiced a number of basic strategies, tactics, and maneuvers. Each strategy starts out with a particular distribution of strong or weaker pieces in the front line or rear areas, as well as in the left flank, center, or right flank. The most common strategies usually depend on clustering or distributing powerful pieces in different areas of the board. In the list below, the first four can be considered "basic strategies" while the last four are relatively "advanced strategies," depending on the player's experience level or creativity.

- Linear Assault - This is a simplistic strategy mostly used by beginners. It consists of powerful units in the front line forming a shield and weaker units at the side and rear line. The whole front line is advanced as a "lawnmower" on a broad front to try to eliminate most of the enemy. Sometimes a lower-ranked piece is placed in the front rank to probe because its elimination causes the eliminating piece to be identified as a strong one. However, massing one's troops side-by-side or behind each other often immobilizes them and prevents them from maneuvering. The linear formation can be disrupted and broken up by Strongpoints and Clustered Task Forces. This Linear Assault is not very effective if one immediately loses one's strong pieces because the only troops left are the weak ones.
- Blitzkrieg - Amass powerful pieces on one side of the board (left or right flank), then try to steamroller and blow a hole through the enemy front lines by eliminating all the defenders on that flank. Once the way is clear, send the Flag forward with an escort and march on to victory to the far edge of the board. A Blitz through the center is rare because it requires lining both sides of the corridor with powerful pieces to eliminate possible blockers of one's Flag. A disadvantage of the Blitzkrieg is that one flank is strong while sacrificial troops man the other flank; an enemy Blitz that, by chance, is pointed at the weak flank, can punch through it easily.
- Banzai Charge - This is a variation of the Blitzkrieg strategy. Troops are generally divided into two or three groups. The center group consists of high-ranking units while the other groups are on one or both flanks with a few strong units. While trying to blast a hole on either of the two flanks, also send a strong blitzkrieg in the center to make a path for the Flag, or just to gain a numerical or positional advantage. This strategy can be effective if the opposing player's pieces are immediately eliminated. However, it can be stopped if the attacking Killers and Sweepers are immediately or gradually eliminated and there are not enough reserve units to carry the Flag through.
- Slow-Moving Shield - The most-high-ranking pieces are arranged in a central disk or clump with the Spies and top Generals in the middle lane and center for defense. The Flag is placed in the center-rear for maximum defense and is not meant to advance to the back row of the enemy territory. The player using this strategy can try to make a slow-moving massed attack up the center or try to guard against offensive probes into the center. It is somewhat vulnerable to the Rampaging Bulls strategy that can penetrate a flank and eliminate weak pieces in the rear. The Distributed Defense and Clustered Task Forces strategies can slowly reduce the Shield formation to eliminate the Spies and Generals.
- Rampaging Bulls - Send unsupported Generals (either Killers or Sweepers) into the enemy lines to eliminate as many opposing pieces and try to put them in the enemy's rear areas to create havoc and disrupt the enemy's plans and composure. Use them to force the enemy to move his Spies or to weaken his front lines so your other high-ranking pieces can make their own rampage. Try to keep the Rampaging Bulls active and mobile as long as possible so they continue to threaten enemy pieces remaining on the board and to help reveal the enemy Spies by their movements. Divert the enemy player's attention from the Rampaging Bulls by making other offensive moves elsewhere on the board.
- Strongholds - The Strongholds strategy consists of assembling three to five units to form a strong point, and it can be shaped similar to a triangle or cross (if you want it revealed to the enemy). The remaining troops, with one Spy [SPY], are interspersed at the sides and front of the Strongholds. Diagonally placed Privates [PVT] in each group can defend and support to kill enemy Spies while your Five-Star [5*G] and Four-Star [4*G] Generals are reserved in the middle of the groups as ambushers by posing as if they were weak pieces. Probers and some Sweepers at the front can help you determine the enemy's high-ranking pieces while threatening to eliminate the enemy Privates and Probers. The stationary Strongholds can start moving forward into offensive mode after some high-ranking enemy pieces or Spies are eliminated.
- Clustered Task Forces - This is similar to the Strongholds strategy but the combatant groups are actively moving around and switching positions often (to try to make the enemy player forget what pieces they might be and where they are). Group a high-ranking general, a Spy, two Privates, and two to three officers into a "combined arms" task force whose job is to eliminate enemy pieces in one area and to reduce his overall numbers. Switch the attack or defensive maneuvers from one Task Force or flank to the other as needed to divert the opponent's attention and make him become confused about the identity of your powerful pieces. Use expert maneuvering of your "hunter-killer groups" to isolate the enemy Flag and eliminate it.
- Distributed Defense - Spread out your powerful pieces with supporting units across the entire battlefield (playing area) to probe and ambush the enemy's Killer pieces. Maneuver your pieces to rearrange them as blocking forces and to deceive the opponent as to which pieces are powerful or sacrificial. Ensure there are maneuver spaces where your powerful pieces can move to. Put lower-ranking Generals in the rear areas to take over the defense or bring them forward to assist in the counterattack. Using this strategy, one can make limited strikes into enemy territory then withdraw those forces before they become trapped or ambushed. Force the enemy to redeploy his pieces so you can identify the enemy's strong versus the weaker units. After eliminating most of the troops in the front and sides, send forward some troops to identify and corner the flag.

=== Switching strategies and changing tactics ===
An experienced player may want to mix two or more of the above-listed strategies and tactics at different locations on the board. For example, he can amass a powerful task force on one flank to conduct a Blitzkrieg offense while setting up a Stronghold in the center or the other flank to try to destroy a possible enemy attack that has Rampaging Bulls or Probers.

A game can have multiple strategies depending on the outcome of the initial challenges. Loss of high-ranking pieces, especially of the Killers, usually stops an offensive action and forces a player to change plans or to go on the defensive. A player needs to muster and redistribute his remaining higher-ranking pieces to avoid the enemy's Killer pieces while continuing to eliminate the mid- and low-ranking pieces. Once numerical balance or superiority is achieved, or if he can outflank the defenders, a player should be able to shift back to offensive Flag-rushing or Flag-hunting operations.

Deception and psychological warfare can be a major component of the game. Players must memorize the position and probable identity of known enemy pieces because losing track of a possible Killer piece or Private can lead to loss of important pieces. Sometimes a Spy [SPY] has to be sacrificed ("split") against a known enemy Spy in order to clear the way for your Sweepers to eliminate the remaining enemy pieces. Try to keep one or more reserve forces available for various contingencies and to provide multiple tactical options or changes in overall strategy. Maneuvering pieces and allocating empty squares in a crowded area is also important to bring your appropriate pieces against lower-level enemy pieces, avoid losses from identified high-powered enemy pieces, or to eliminate the enemy Flag.

== Variations ==
There are many variations to make the game more exciting or difficult. Many variations involve simple modifications like showing the flag or simply playing with only 11 pieces. These modifications are often combined to make the game more challenging.

=== Krig ===
Krig is one of the online variants. Rules are very similar except:

- Players can place one piece in their respective borders
- Players identity is hidden until the end
- Pieces will be revealed at the end

=== "The Generals Electronic Strategy Game" ===
In 1980, Ideal released The Generals Electronic Strategy Game. The rules and piece ranks are the same as above, except that the "Spies" are "Agents", and an electronic arbiter determines which piece wins in a confrontation; neither player sees his opponent's pieces. The plastic pieces have selected notches on their bases, which depress certain indentations in the electronic arbiter's twin slots. The lights flash and a short musical phrase plays before a light labeled "battle winner" is illuminated. The losing piece is removed from the board, while the winning piece is placed back on the board. If the flag is placed in the arbiter, it plays "Taps" after the initial musical phrase.

Unlike the original version of the game, if a player's Flag reaches the back row in The Generals Electronic Strategy Game, that player wins, even if an opposing piece occupies an adjacent square on the back row.

=== Software ===
Software versions of Game of the Generals have been developed for various platforms. The game's rules and mechanics lend themselves to digitization, allowing a software-based arbiter to handle challenges and determine win conditions in place of a human referee.

An example is Game of the Generals Mobile, a mobile application developed by Mawkins Entertainment and released for Android devices in 2020. The app supports online and offline play, AI opponents, match replays, and player rankings.

In 1988, three college students from the Philippines—Paul Q. Gozon, Paterno A. Lim, and Hector C. Santos—created a software version of the game using Turbo Pascal as part of an academic thesis. The project aimed to replicate decision-making processes in gameplay through a computerized opponent.

== Comparison with Stratego ==
Generals bears many similarities with Stratego, including a hierarchy/ranking of pieces, invisible enemy piece values, arbitrary initial placement within a player's "home" area, and the use of spies to eliminate high-ranking pieces.

However, unlike Stratego, Generals does not have any bombs, nor miners to defuse them. The Generals spies act as reusable mines, as they will remove almost all pieces when attacked yet are not themselves removed from the board. Generals also does not have scouts, which may cross several spaces across the board in one move. All of the pieces in Generals can move, while both the flag and the bombs in Stratego are stationary. Also, each player has two Spies in Generals, while each only has one Spy in Stratego. In general, Stratego has more pieces than Generals and games accordingly last longer.

In addition, unlike Stratego, which features two "lakes" in the middle of the board, all 72 of the squares on the Generals board are accessible. There are six empty spaces during the initial placement of pieces in the three ranks closest to the player for Generals, while the same three ranks are completely filled in Stratego.

Finally, Generals inherently requires a third-party Arbiter (either human or electronic) to maintain the game's uncertainty all the way to the endgame. Stratego requires that both players' pieces be revealed during a challenge to determine which is removed.

== Reviews ==
- The board game was imported to the United States by Atmar Enterprises and shown at the 1978 Toy Fair; Sid Sackson noted it "offers some new twists on Stratego, including ... an arbiter [which] announces the winner of a challenge, without divulging the strength of the pieces involved."
- The electronic version published by Ideal was briefly profiled as part of the 1980 Games 100 in Games magazine; Sackson's review called it an "intriguing battle game".
