= L'Attaque =

1909 French board game

- Designers: Hermance Edan
- Publishers: Au Jeu Retrouvé; H. P. Gibson & Sons
- Publication: 1909; 117 years ago
- Genres: Board wargames; Strategy games
- Players: 2
- Playing time: 20 minutes
- Age range: 12+

L'Attaque or The Attack is a French board wargame first published by Hermance Edan in 1909 which inspired the creation of later games, such as Stratego. Two players each move 36 ranked game pieces with hidden identities and challenge opposing pieces, the results of which are determined by the rank hierarchy, in order to either capture their opponent's Flag or manipulate the board so their opponent cannot make any further moves.

== Publication history ==
According to historian and game collector Thierry Depaulis, on November 26 1908 Frenchwoman Hermance Edan filed a patent for a "jeu de bataille avec pièces mobiles sur damier" (a battle game with mobile pieces on a gameboard) with the French Patent Office, based on a game she had developed in the 1880s. The patent (patent #396.795) was released in 1909 and the game began being sold by French game manufacturer Au Jeu Retrouvé in 1910 under the name "L'Attaque". It was sold in France by department store La Samaritaine, and appeared in Britain before World War I. In 1925, English game maker H.P. Gibson and Sons bought the rights to the game and began publishing at least until the 1970s, initially retaining the French name before eventually changing it to "The Attack".

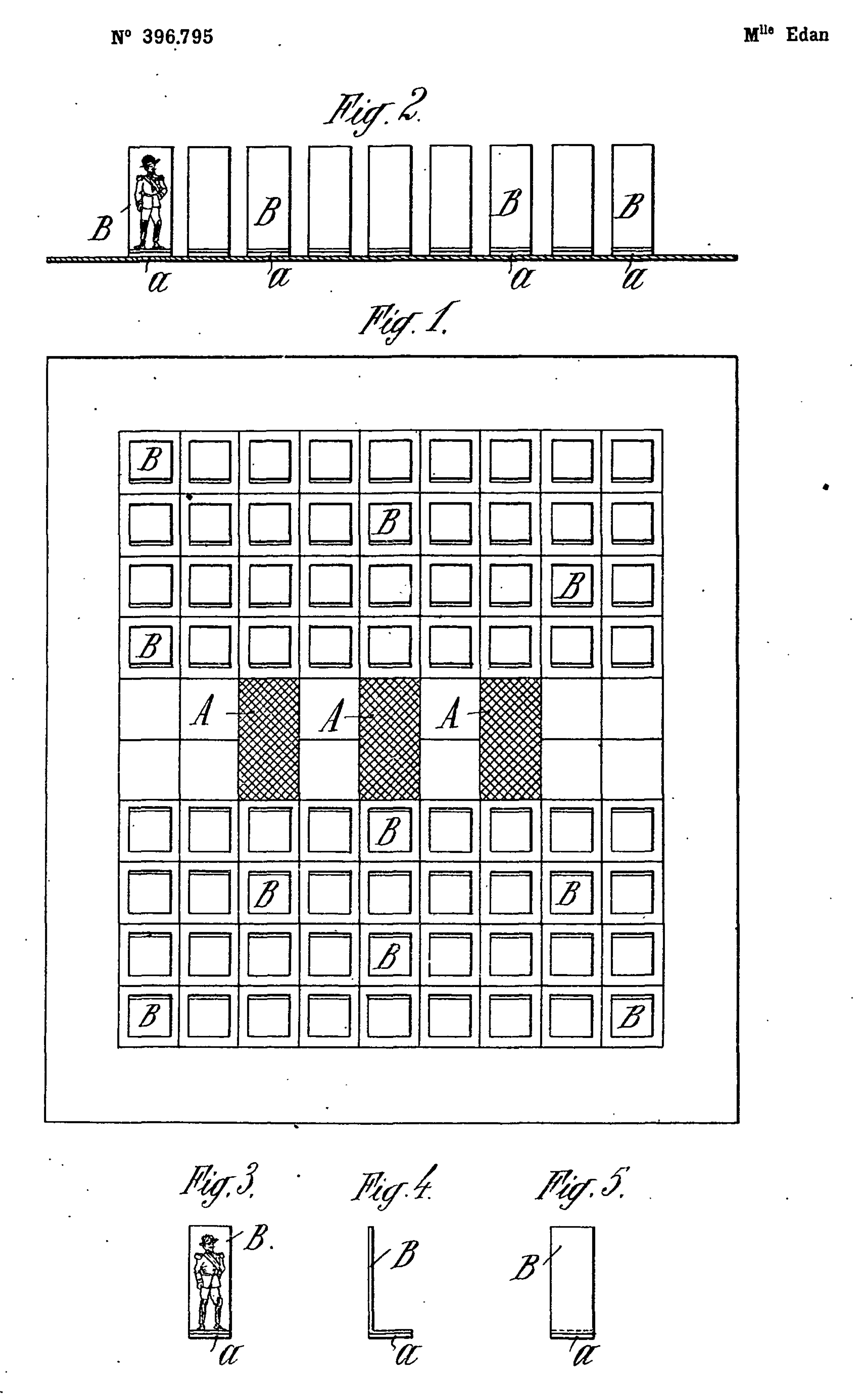
Early drawings of L'Attaque done by Hermance Edan included in the patent

=== Related and derivative games ===
L'Attaque shows similarities to the Chinese game dou shou qi, also known as jungle, in which ranked animals pieces capture lower ranked pieces. Some believe L'Attaque is a later version of jungle, but according to historian R.C. Bell, Jungle was first published in the 20th century and cannot have been a predecessor. The game also shows similarities to Gunjin Shōgi, a 19th century Japanese game which uses pieces akin to Shogi but otherwise plays like L'Attaque.

In 1932, Gibson and Sons published Tri-tactics, which was a combination of three of their previous publications – L'Attaque, Dover Patrol, and Aviation – and consisted of various fighting units engaging in land and water combat to capture their opponent's Naval Base or Headquarters.

Stratego is a nearly identical game to L'Attaque, aside from the use of additional pieces, and historians Fred Horn and Alex de Voogt state that the idea for it was likely derived from or transmitted as a result of L'Attaque. Stratego was first published in the Netherlands in 1946 and later in the United States in 1961, and since has had many alternative versions, themed editions, and spinoffs.

== Gameplay ==
L'Attaque is played on a 9×10 board with three 2-square lakes in the centre. Both players receive 36 standing rectangular cardboard pieces of various ranks, colour printed with soldiers in contemporary (to 1900) uniforms – not Napoleonic, as in Stratego – of red or blue. Each piece has a military hierarchal value and can only capture pieces with a lower rank than them. Players set up their pieces facing them in the first four rows of their side, such that neither player can see the rank of their opponent's pieces.

Rank	Piece	Count per player	Special properties
10	Commander-in-chief	1	Vulnerable only to a Mine or attacking Spy
9	Brigadier General	1	
8	Colonel	2	
7	Commandant	2	
6	Captain	4	
5	Lieutenant	4	
4	Sergeant	4	
3	Sapper	4	Can capture Mines without being removed from the game
2	Scout	8	Can move any distance in a non-diagonal straight line without leaping over pieces or lakes; cannot capture another Scout; an attacking Scout returns to their space after attacking
1	Spy	1	Can capture the Commander-in-chief
	Flag	1	Immobile; capturing the opponent's Flag wins the game
	Mine	4	Immobile; any piece (except a Sapper) attacking a Mine is removed from the game

Players take turns moving one of their pieces a single space vertically or horizontally, although pieces cannot move into a space with a lake or another piece. If two pieces come face-to-face, the player whose turn it is can choose to attack. Both players then reveal their pieces and, unless their ability says otherwise, the one with the lower rank is captured and removed from the board. If the pieces are of equal rank, both are removed.

The game continues until a player captures either their opponent's Flag or all of their moveable pieces.

== Reception ==
Eric Solomon, writing for Issue 24 of Games & Puzzles, described L'Attaque as "an inexpensive and unpretentious game not claiming to be realistic in any sense" and praised it for its fast pace and clarity of the rules.
