= Jungle (board game) =

Board game

鬥獸棋/斗兽棋 (dou shou qi)
- A typical and inexpensive Jungle set with paper board, purchased at a Chinese stationery shop
- Genres: Board game; Abstract strategy game
- Players: 2
- Setup time: 1–2 minutes
- Playing time: 5–30 minutes
- Chance: None
- Skills: Strategy, tactics, counting
- Synonyms: Dou shou qi; The jungle game; Children's chess; Oriental chess; Animal chess

Jungle or dou shou qi (simplified Chinese: 斗兽棋; traditional Chinese: 鬥獸棋; pinyin: dòu shòu qí; lit. 'fighting animal game') is a modern Chinese board game with an obscure history. A British version known as "Jungle King" was sold in the 1960s by the John Waddington company. The game is played on a 7×9 board and is popular with children in the Far East.

Jungle is a two-player strategy game and has been cited by The Playboy Winner's Guide to Board Games as resembling the Western game Stratego. The game is also known as the jungle game, children's chess, oriental chess, animal kingdom and animal chess.

== Overview ==
The Jungle gameboard represents a jungle terrain with dens, traps "set" around dens, and rivers. Each player controls eight game pieces representing different animals of various rank. Stronger-ranked animals can capture ("eat") animals of weaker or equal rank. The player who is first to maneuver any one of their pieces into the opponent's den wins the game. An alternative way to win is to capture all the opponent's pieces.

== Board ==
The Jungle gameboard, usually made of paper, consists of seven columns and nine rows of squares (7×9 rectangle = 63 squares). Pieces move on the squares as in chess, not on the grid lines as in xiangqi. Pictures of eight animals and their names appear on each side of the board to indicate initial placement of the game pieces. After initial setup, these designated squares have no special meaning in the gameplay.

There are several special squares and areas of the Jungle board:

- Each player has one den (Chinese: 獸穴; pinyin: shòuxuè; lit. 'lair') square located in the centre of their first row of the board and labeled as such in Chinese.
- Three traps (Chinese: 陷阱; pinyin: xiànjǐng; lit. 'snare') border each den, to each side and in front. These are also labeled in Chinese.
- Two water areas or rivers (Chinese: 小河; pinyin: xiǎohé; lit. 'river') are located in the centre of the board, each comprising 6 squares in a 2×3 rectangle, and labeled with the Chinese characters for "river". There are single columns of ordinary land squares on the edges of the board, and down the middle between the rivers.

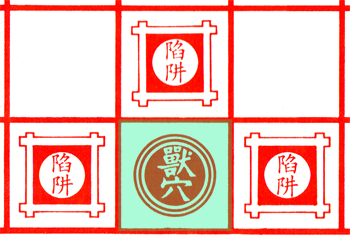
The den highlighted in green

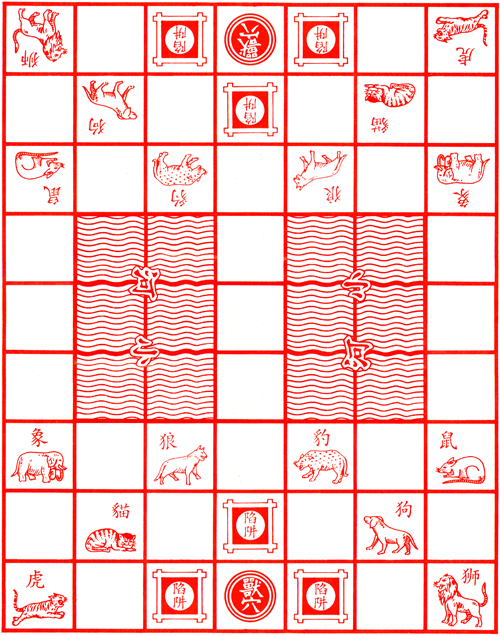
A typical Jungle board labelling the starting squares, the den, the traps, and the rivers

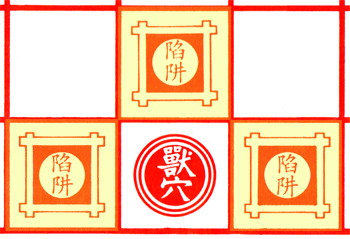
The traps highlighted in yellow

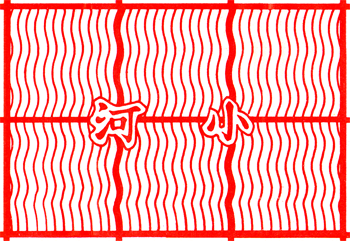
One of the rivers

== Pieces ==
Each player has eight game pieces representing different animals, each with a different rank, and in their own colour (blue versus red). The animal ranking, from strongest to weakest, is:

| Rank | Piece | |
|---|---|---|
| 8 | Elephant | Chinese: 象; pinyin: xiàng |
| 7 | Lion | Chinese: 獅; pinyin: shī |
| 6 | Tiger | Chinese: 虎; pinyin: hǔ |
| 5 | Leopard | Chinese: 豹; pinyin: bào |
| 4 | Wolf | Chinese: 狼; pinyin: láng |
| 3 | Dog | Chinese: 狗; pinyin: gǒu |
| 2 | Cat | Chinese: 貓; pinyin: māo |
| 1 | Rat | Chinese: 鼠; pinyin: shǔ |

Pieces start on squares with pictures corresponding to their animal, which are invariably shown on the Jungle board.

== Rules ==
=== Movement ===
Players alternate moves with Blue moving first. During their turn, a player must move. All pieces can move one square horizontally or vertically (not diagonally). A piece may not move into its own den. Animals of either side can move into and out of any trap square.

There are special rules related to the water squares:

- The rat is the only animal that may go onto (or off of) a water square.
- The lion and tiger can jump over a river vertically. The lion can also jump over a river horizontally; in many Chinese rule sets the tiger can as well. They jump from a square on one edge of the river to the next non-water square on the other side.
- If that square contains an enemy piece of equal or lower rank, the lion or tiger capture it as part of their jump.
- A jumping move is blocked (not permitted) if a rat of either color currently occupies any of the intervening water squares.

=== Capturing ===
Animals capture opponent pieces by "killing/eating" them (the attacking piece replaces the captured piece on its square; the captured piece is removed from the game). A piece can capture any enemy piece that has the same or lower rank, with the following exceptions:

- The rat can "kill" (capture) an elephant, but only from a land square, not from a water square.
  Many published versions of the game say the rat kills the elephant by "running into its ear and gnawing into its brain".
- A rat in the water is invulnerable to capture by any piece on land. (Therefore, a rat in the water can only be killed by another rat in the water.)
- A piece that enters one of the opponent's trap squares is reduced in rank to 0. Thus the trapped piece may be captured by the defending side with any piece, regardless of rank. A trapped piece has its normal rank restored when it exits an opponent's trap square.

== Minor variations ==
There are some commonly played ruleset variations, as follows:

- The elephant may not kill the rat under any circumstances.
- Some play the game with the lion and tiger being equally strong, whereby they can kill each other.
- Some versions have the tiger outranking the lion.
- The leopard may jump over the river horizontally but not vertically (due to its lesser strength than the tiger or lion). It can jump over a rat in the river.
- All traps are universal. If an animal goes into a trap in its own region, an opponent animal is able to capture it regardless of rank difference if it is beside the trapped animal. The rules for being on one's own trap do vary.
- A variant has the wolf replaced by the fox, in which case the dog is stronger than the fox.
- There are variations in which the lion is not able to jump across the river horizontally.
- The rules for the rat to capture either the elephant or rat from or into the water do vary.
- There is a simplified version called animal checkers, which has no traps or rivers, and only the rat, dog, tiger and elephant.
- Amongst the many examples shown on BoardGameGeek there is at least one where the pieces are designed so that they are no longer visible by the opponent (mounted as a card on a stand like Stratego pieces). This change alters the game from one of stochastic 'full-knowledge' to one of partial-knowledge.
- There is a version of the game that limits which animals (rankings 1–4) can move onto the trap squares.
- Some players prefer allowing the dog to move onto water squares.

== See also ==
- Jun Qi
- Chinese chess
- Congo (chess variant)
