= Pass the Bomb =

Pass the Bomb is a word game invented by Jon Kitching, licensed by Weekend Games and published by Piatnik. It consists of a timer in the shape of a black bomb with a string fuse. Pressing a button starts a loud ticking and, after a random time interval, the sound of an explosion. Players must pass the bomb from hand to hand to avoid being blown up but, in order to do this, they must say a new word. This word must contain letters from a card which is turned to start the round. For example, if the letters are KE then the word might be keep or spike. Thirteen rounds are played and the player who has lost the fewest lives is the winner.

The original version contains a die which restricts the location of the letters within each word. The smaller travel version has an extra-loud bomb but no die.
