= Stratego =

Strategy board game

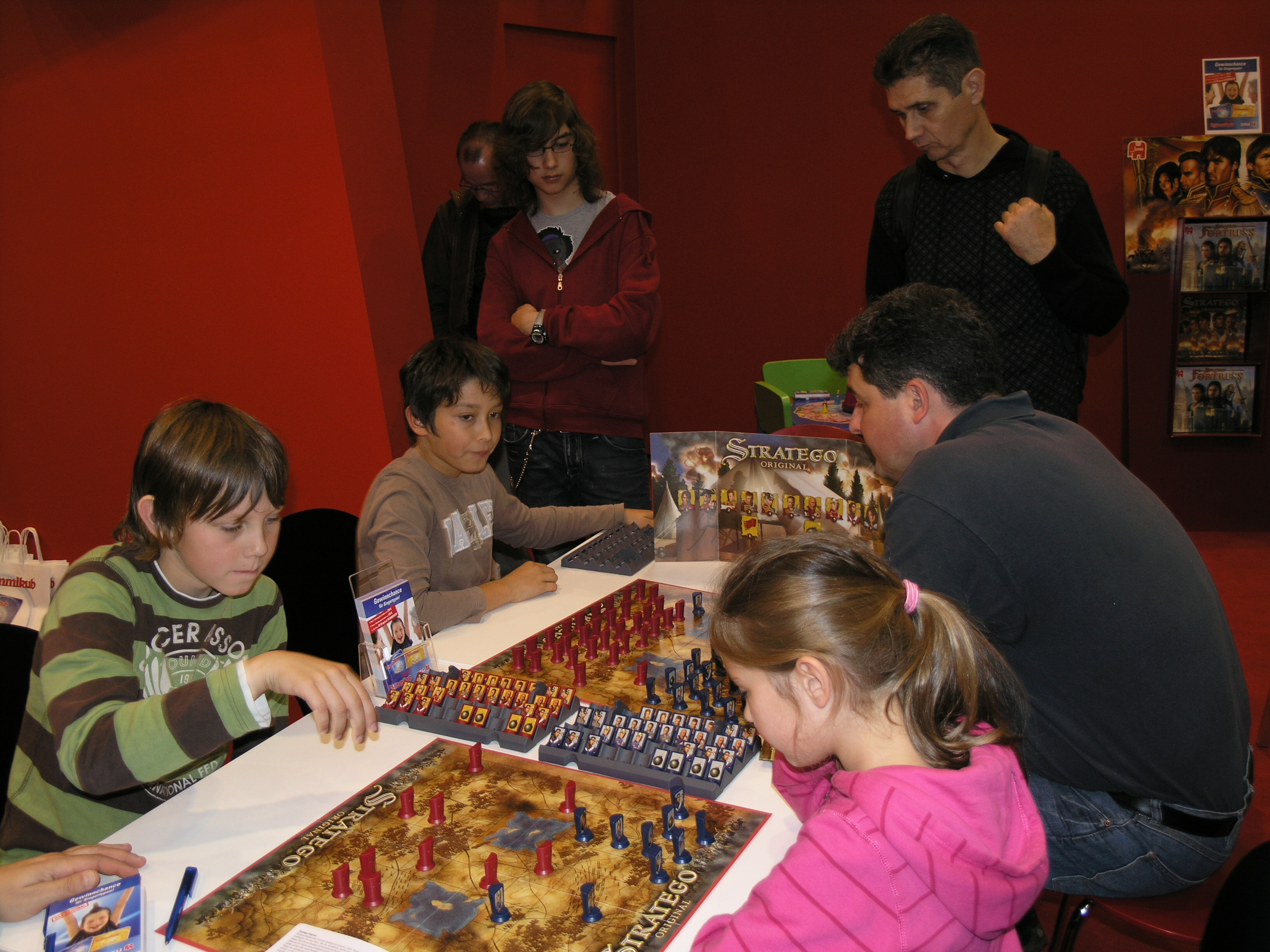
- Two games of Stratego in session
- Publishers: Jumbo Games
- Years active: 1946–present
- Genres: Board game Strategy game War game
- Players: 2
- Setup time: 1 to 5 minutes
- Playing time: 10 minutes to 1.5 hours
- Chance: None
- Age range: 8+
- Skills: Strategy, tactics, memory, bluff

Stratego (/strəˈtiːɡoʊ/ strə-TEE-goh) is a chess-like strategy board wargame for two players on a board of 10×10 squares. Each player controls an army of 40 pieces representing individual officer and soldier ranks through a numbering scheme. The pieces have Napoleonic insignia. The objective of the game is to either find and capture the opponent's Flag or to capture all movable enemy pieces so that the opponent cannot make any further moves. Stratego has simple rules but a depth of strategy.

The game is a slightly modified copy of an early 20th century French game named L'Attaque ('The Attack'), and has been in production in Europe since World War II and the United States since 1961. There are now two- and four-player versions, versions with 10, 30 or 40 pieces per player, and boards with smaller sizes (number of spaces). There are also variant pieces and different rulesets.

The International Stratego Federation, the game's governing body, sponsors an annual Stratego World Championship.

== Name and trademark ==
Stratego is from the French or Greek strategos (var. strategus) for leader of an ancient (especially Greek) army: first general.

The name Stratego was first registered in 1942 in the Netherlands. The United States trademark was filed in 1958 and registered in 1960 to Jacques Johan Mogendorff and is presently owned by Jumbo Games as successors to Hausemann and Hotte, headquartered in the Netherlands. It has been licensed to manufacturers such as Milton Bradley, Hasbro and others, as well as retailers such as Barnes & Noble, Target stores, etc.

== The contents of the game ==
	A	B	C	D	E	F	G	H	I	J
10										
9										
8										
7										
6										
5										
4										
3										
2										
1										

This description is of the original and classic games; many variant shapes and colors of pieces and boards have been produced in the decades since.

The game box contents are a set of 40 gold-embossed red playing pieces, a set of silver-embossed blue playing pieces, and a folding 15 1/2 in × 18 1/2 in (39 cm × 47 cm) rectangular cardboard playing board imprinted with a 10×10 grid of spaces. The early sets featured painted wood pieces, later sets colored plastic. The pieces are small and roughly rectangular, 1 in (25 mm) tall and 3/4 in (19 mm) wide, and unweighted. More modern versions first introduced in Europe have cylindrical castle-shaped pieces. Some versions have a cardboard privacy screen to assist setup. A few versions have wooden boxes or boards.

== Setup ==
Typically, color is chosen by lot: one player uses red pieces, and the other uses blue pieces. Before the start of the game, players arrange their 40 pieces in a 4×10 configuration at either end of the board. The ranks are printed on one side only and placed so that the players cannot identify the opponent's pieces. Players may not place pieces in the lakes or the 12 squares in the center of the board. Such pre-play distinguishes the fundamental strategy of particular players and influences the outcome of the game.

== Gameplay ==
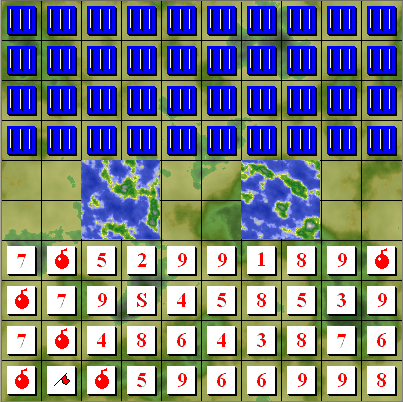
Computer software version of Stratego

Players alternate moving; red moves first. The right to move first does not significantly affect game play (unlike chess). Each player moves one piece per turn. A player must move a piece in their turn; one cannot skip a turn.

Two zones in the middle of the board, each 2×2, cannot be entered by either player's pieces at any time. They are shown as lakes on the battlefield and serve as choke points to make frontal assaults less direct.

The game can be won by capturing the opponent's Flag or all of their moveable pieces. It is possible to have ranked pieces that are not moveable because they are trapped behind bombs. In unusual cases, it is possible to draw, for example, when both players' flags are protected by bombs and each player has one remaining piece which is not a miner.

The average game has 381 moves. The number of legal positions is 10^{115}. The number of possible games is 10^{535}. Stratego has many more moves and possible board states than other familiar games such as chess and backgammon; however, unlike those games where a single bad move at any point may result in loss of the game, most moves in Stratego are inconsequential as players think in "games not moves".

=== Rules of movement ===
All movable pieces, with the exception of the Scout, may move only one step to any adjacent space vertically or horizontally (but not diagonally). A piece may not move onto a space occupied by a like-color piece. Bomb and Flag pieces are not moveable. The Scout may move any number of spaces in a straight line (such as the rook in chess). In the older versions of Stratego the Scout could not move and strike in the same turn; in newer versions this was allowed. Even before that, sanctioned play usually amended the original Scout movement to allow moving and striking in the same turn because it facilitates gameplay.

No piece can move back and forth between the same two spaces for more than three consecutive turns (two square rule). Nor can a piece endlessly chase an opposing piece it has no hope of attacking (more square rule).

When a player wants to attack, they "strike" by touching an opposing piece with their piece or by moving it onto the square the opposing piece occupies. Both players then reveal their piece's rank; the weaker piece (see exceptions below) is removed from the board. If the engaging pieces are of equal rank, both are removed. A piece may not move onto a square already occupied unless it attacks. The original rules also contained a provision that following a strike, the winning piece immediately occupies the space vacated by the losing piece. (Note: However, due to a misprint, this meant that when the winning piece is the struck piece, it moves out of position to take the space previously occupied by the striker. The rules were amended later to make it clear that when the winning piece is the struck (defending) piece, it remains in place.)

Two pieces have special attack powers. One special piece is the Bomb which only Miners can defuse. It immediately eliminates any other piece striking it without being destroyed itself. Each player also has one Spy, which succeeds only if it attacks the Marshal or the Flag. If the Spy attacks any other piece, or is attacked by any piece (including the Marshal), the Spy is defeated.

=== Recording the game ===
Competitive play does not include recording the game, unlike chess. The game is fast-paced, no standard notation exists, and players keep their initial setups secret, so recording over-the-board games is impractical.

However, digital interfaces such as web-based gaming interfaces may have a facility for recording, replaying and downloading the game. Those interfaces use an algebraic-style notation that numbers the rows ('ranks') 1 to 10 from bottom to top and the columns ('files') A to J from left to right. Alternately, a few interfaces designate the files as A to K, omitting 'I'. Moves are recorded as source square followed by destination square separated by a "-" (move) or "x" (strike). Revealed pieces on strikes precede the square designation, and may be by either rank name or rank number for brevity, for example "major B2xcaptain B3". The bottom half of the board is by default considered to be the 'red' side, and the top half the 'blue' side.

=== Strategy ===
Unlike chess, Stratego is a game of imperfect information. In addition to calculated sequences of moves, this gives rise to aspects of battle psychology such as concealment, bluffing, lying in wait and guessing.

There are also strategic and tactical elements in the initial setup of the pieces. Stylistic preferences ("aggressive" vs "defensive") also enter into setup.

== Pieces ==
=== Classic pieces ===
There are seven immobile pieces – six Bombs and one Flag – and 33 mobile pieces per player. They can move to the adjacent square in horizontal or vertical direction, with exception of the Scout, which moves any distance. From highest rank to lowest the pieces are:

US / EU Rank	"Classic" US Rank	Piece	Count per player	Special properties
B	B	Bomb	6	Immovable; any piece attacking a Bomb is removed from the game, unless the attacking piece was a Miner
10	1	Marshal	1	Most powerful piece, but vulnerable to capture by an attacking Spy
9	2	General	1	
8	3	Colonel	2	
7	4	Major	3	
6	5	Captain	4	
5	6	Lieutenant	4	
4	7	Sergeant	4	
3	8	Miner	5	Can defuse (i. e. capture) Bombs
2	9	Scout	8	Can move any distance in a horizontal or vertical straight line without leaping over pieces or lakes; originally unable to move and attack in the same turn, later changed to allow movement and attack.
1	S	Spy	1	Weakest piece, captured by any other attacking piece, but an attacking Spy can capture the Marshal
F	F	Flag	1	Immovable; capturing the opponent's Flag wins the game

The higher ranked piece always captures the lower, except when stated otherwise. When a piece attacks another piece with equal rank, both are removed.

In the original versions published in the United States, the ranks were numbered with the most powerful Marshal piece ranked at 1, then numbers ascending as power fell until Scout was 9, and the Spy was not numbered but designated S. In 2000, this was inverted, with the Marshal ranked as 10, descending to 2 for the Scout, and the Spy ranked with number 1. "Classic" versions have been released since then with the lower number strongest, as in prior versions of the game.

=== Variant pieces ===
Variant versions of the game have a few different pieces with different rules of movement, such as the Cannon, Archer (possibly a different name for the Cannon), Spotter, Infiltrator, Corporal and Cavalry Captain. In one version, mobile pieces are allowed to "carry" the Flag. In some variants such as Stratego Waterloo and Fire and Ice Stratego, all or most of the pieces have substantially different moves.

== History ==
=== Japanese Military Chess ===
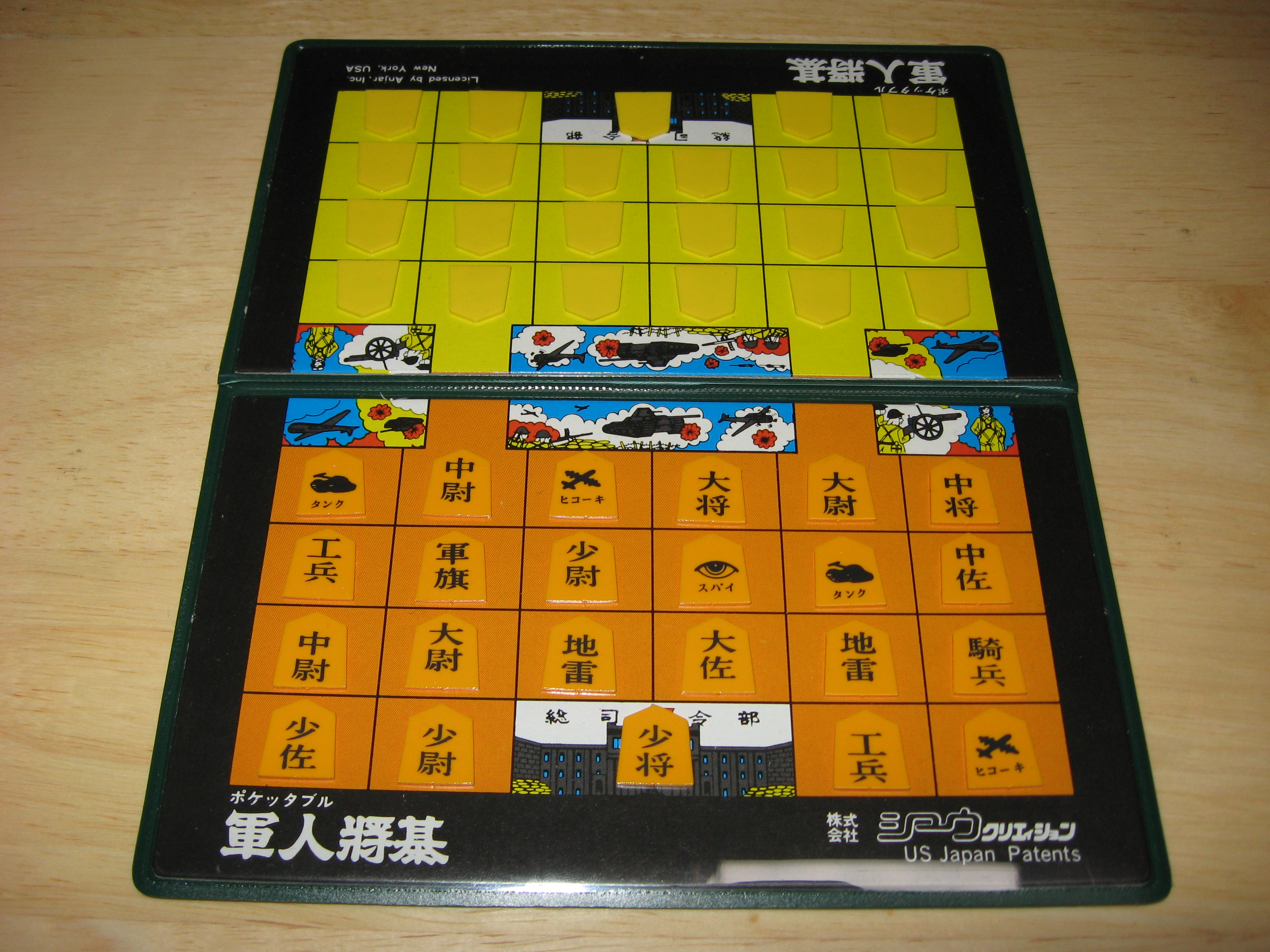
Gunjin Shogi (23-piece)

Japanese Military Chess (Gunjin Shogi) has been sold and played since as early as 1895, although it is not known by whom and when it was invented. Dr. Christian Junghans reported this game in Monatshefte magazine in Germany in 1905. It seems, only after reading his article, Julie Berg took out a patent on a war game in London and Paris in 1907. Similarly, Hermance Edan took a patent for L'attaque game in 1909 and sold them in 1910.

The main differences between Gunjin Shogi and Stratego are:

- Gunjin Shogi needs a referee to resolve the battles of the pieces, which are kept face-down throughout the game.
- The Flag is placed only on the headquarters and a player who successfully occupied the headquarters of the opponent shall win the game.
- There are no Scout pieces. The Engineers and Spy have the same movement as the Scouts in Stratego.
- Only flag and senior officers can occupy the opponent's headquarters.
- Engineer (analogue of miner) can remove mines and tanks.

There are at least three different versions of Gunjin Shogi, distinguished by the number of pieces controlled by each player as well as the size of the board. The 23- and 31-piece versions are similar, influenced by the technology of World War I, and the 25-piece version is a more recent development, incorporating technologies developed during World War II.

=== French L'Attaque ===
Jeu de bataille ave pièces mobiles sur damier pieces
Rank	Piece	Qty
B	mine	4
1	général chef d'armée	1
2	général chef de brigade	1
3	colonel	2
4	commandant	2
5	capitain	4
6	lieutenant	4
7	sergent	4
8	sapeur	4
9	éclaireur	8
S	espion	1
F	le drapeau	1

In nearly its present form Stratego appeared in France from La Samaritaine in 1910, and then in Britain before World War I, as a game called L'Attaque. Historian and game collector Thierry Depaulis writes:

It was in fact designed by a lady, Mademoiselle Hermance Edan, who filed a patent for a "jeu de bataille avec pièces mobiles sur damier" (a battle game with mobile pieces on a gameboard) on 1908-11-26. The patent was released by the French Patent Office in 1909 (patent #396.795). Hermance Edan had given no name to her game but a French manufacturer named Au Jeu Retrouvé was selling the game as L'Attaque as early as 1910.

"Jeu de bataille avec pièces mobiles sur damier" gameboard
	A	B	C	D	E	F	G	H	I
10									
9									
8									
7									
6									
5									
4									
3									
2									
1									

The French patent has 36 pieces for each player and also has a slightly different board layout, but it introduced the same hierarchical rules of attack and movement followed by modern versions of the game. Depaulis further notes the 1910 version had two armies, divided into red and blue colors. The rules of L'attaque were basically the same as Stratego. It featured standing cardboard rectangular pieces, color printed with soldiers who wore contemporary (to 1900) uniforms, not Napoleonic uniforms. In papers of her estate, Ms. Edan states that she developed the game in the 1880s.

=== H. P. Gibson & Sons games ===
The publishing rights for L'Attaque were acquired for the United Kingdom by game maker H.P. Gibson and Sons in 1925, retaining the French name through at least the 1970s. Gibsons also produced several modified forms of the game, at least one of which predates the acquisition of the rights:

- Dover Patrol – a naval warfare game on a board of 12×8 squares devised by Harry A. Gibson in 1911, but very similar to L'Attaque (and hence Stratego)
- Aviation (game) – an air battle variation designed by Harry Gibson in 1925, with a variant called Battle of Britain sold in the 1970s
- Tri-Tactics – a game combining land, sea and air warfare on a 12×12 board, with 56 pieces per person, dating from 1932, evolved from the above games.

In 2019, Gibsons released a 100th anniversary edition of L'Attaque. This edition included both the original and modern rules.

=== Stratego (classic) ===
Stratego was created by Dutchman Jacques Johan Mogendorff sometime before 1942. The name was registered as a trademark in 1942 by the Dutch company Van Perlstein & Roeper Bosch N.V. (which also produced the first edition of Monopoly). After WW2, Mogendorff licensed Stratego to Smeets and Schippers, a Dutch company, in 1946. Hausemann and Hotte acquired a license in 1958 for European distribution, and in 1959 for global distribution. After Mogendorff's death in 1961, Hausemann and Hotte purchased the trademark from his heirs, and sublicensed it to Milton Bradley (which was acquired by Hasbro in 1984) in 1961 for United States distribution. It is introduced to the people of the United States as, "the American version of the game now popular on the Continent." In 2009, Hausemann and Hotte was succeeded by Koninklijke Jumbo B.V. in the Netherlands.

The modern game of Stratego, with its Napoleonic imagery, was originally manufactured in the Netherlands. Pieces were originally made of printed cardboard and inserted in metal clip stands. After World War II, painted wood pieces became standard. Starting in the early 1960s all versions switched to plastic pieces. The change from wood to plastic was made for economical reasons, as was the case with many products during that period, but with Stratego the change also served a structural function: Unlike the wooden pieces, the plastic pieces were designed with a small base. The wooden pieces had none, often resulting in pieces tipping over. This was disastrous for that player, since it often immediately revealed the piece's rank, as well as unleashing a literal domino effect by having a falling piece knock over other pieces. European versions introduced cylindrical castle-shaped pieces that proved to be popular. American editions later introduced new rectangular pieces with a more stable base and colorful stickers, not images directly imprinted on the plastic.

European versions of the game give the Marshal the highest number (10), while the initial American versions used the numbering system of L'Attaque, giving the Marshal the lowest number (1) to show the highest value (i.e. it is the number 1, or most powerful, tile). More recent American versions of the game, which adopted the European system, caused considerable complaint among American players who grew up in the 1960s and 1970s. This may have been a factor in the release of a Nostalgia edition, in a wooden box, reproducing the classic edition of the early 1970s.

=== Modern Stratego variations ===
==== Electronic Stratego ====
Electronic Stratego was introduced by Milton Bradley in 1982. To promote the release, the company hired two actors to play Ronald Reagan and Leonid Brezhnev, who played a match at the New York Public Library Main Branch.

It has features that make many aspects of the game strikingly different from those of classic Stratego. The board is 8 wide by 10 squares deep, instead of 10×10. The blocked "lake" areas are therefore 1×2 instead of 2×2. Each side has 24 pieces, instead of 40, deployed in the three rows closest to the player; instead of six bomb pieces, Electronic Stratego uses hidden bomb pegs.

Each type of playing piece in Electronic Stratego has a unique series of bumps on its bottom that are read by the game's battery-operated touch-sensitive "board". When attacking another piece, the attacking player hits their Strike button, presses their piece and then the targeted piece: the game either rewards a successful attack or punishes a failed strike with an appropriate bit of music. In this way the players never know for certain the rank of the piece that wins the attack, only whether the attack wins, fails, or ties (similar to the role of the referee in the Chinese game of Luzhanqi). Instead of choosing to move a piece, a player can opt to "probe" an opposing piece by hitting the Probe button and pressing down on the enemy piece: the game then beeps out a rough approximation of the strength of that piece.

There are no Bomb pieces: Bombs are set using pegs placed on a touch-sensitive "peg board" that is closed from view prior to the start of the game. Hence, it is possible for a player to have their piece occupying a square with a bomb on it. If an opposing piece lands on the seemingly empty square, the game plays the sound of an explosion and that piece is removed from play. As in classic Stratego, only a Miner can remove a Bomb from play.

The Scout is allowed to move diagonally, in addition to its usual horizontal and vertical moves. Again, as with the non-electronic Stratego, scouts are not allowed to jump over pieces.

A player who successfully captures the opposing Flag is rewarded with a triumphant bit of music from the 1812 Overture.

==== New pieces and versions ====
In the late 1990s, the Jumbo Company released several European variants, including a three- and four-player version, and a new Cannon piece (which jumps two squares to capture any piece, but loses to any attack against it). It also included some alternate rules such as Barrage (a quicker two-player game with fewer pieces) and Reserves (reinforcements in the three- and four-player games). The four-player version appeared in America in 1997.

Starting in the 2000s, Hasbro, under its Milton Bradley label, released a series of popular media-themed Stratego editions.

Besides themed variants with substantially different rules, current production includes three slightly different editions: sets with classic (1961) piece numbering (highest rank=1), sets with European piece numbering (highest rank=10), and sets that allow substitution of one or two variant pieces such as Cannons, usually in place of scouts. Sets produced since 1970 or so have uniformly adopted the rule that scouts can move and strike in the same turn.

== Stratego AI ==
In July 2022, DeepMind announced the development of DeepNash, a model-free multi-agent reinforcement learning system capable of playing Stratego at the level of a human expert. Stratego has been difficult to model well because the opponent's pieces are hidden, making it a game of imperfect information, the initial setup has more than 10^{66} possible states, and the overall game tree has 10^{535} possible states. DeepNash was able to win 84% of 50 ranked matches in online matches hosted by Gravon over a period of two weeks in April 2022 against human players, and won at a minimum rate of 97% over hundreds of matches against previously-developed Stratego-playing programs including Probe, Master of the Flag, Demon of Ignorance, Asmodeus, Celsius, PeternLewis, and Vixen.

In 2026, a model named Ataraxos beat Pim Niemeijer, a four-time world champion, 15–1 with 4 draws.

== Related and derivative games ==
Stratego and its predecessor L'Attaque have spawned several derivative games, notably one 20th century Chinese game, "Game of the fighting animals" (Dou Shou Qi) also known as Jungle or "Animal Chess".

The game Jungle also has pieces (but of animals rather than soldiers) with different ranks and pieces with higher rank capture the pieces with lower rank. The board, with two lakes in the middle, is also remarkably similar to that in Stratego. The major differences between the two games is that in Jungle, the pieces are not hidden from the opponent, and the setup is fixed. According to historian R.C. Bell, this game is 20th century, and cannot have been a predecessor of L'Attaque or Stratego.

A more elaborate and complex Chinese game known as Land Battle Chess (Lu Zhan Qi) or Army Chess (Lu Zhan Jun Qi) is a similar board game to Stratego, with a few differences: It is played on a 5×13 board with two un-occupiable spaces in the middle, and each player has 25 playing pieces. The setup is not fixed, both players keep their pieces hidden from their opponent, and the objective is to capture the enemy's flag.[2] Lu Zhan Jun Qi's basic gameplay is similar, though differences include "missile" pieces and a xiangqi-style board layout with the addition of railroads and defensive "camps". A third person is also typically used as a referee to decide battles between pieces without revealing their identities. An expanded version of the Land Battle Chess game also exists, adding naval and aircraft pieces and is known as Sea-Land-Air Battle Chess (Hai Lu Kong Zhan Qi).[3] There is also a 4-player version of Lu Zhan Jun Qi that has players opposite to each other on the board be on the same team and try to capture the opposite teams' flags and can defend each other from the opposition's attacks.

- Tri-tactics, by Gibson & Sons introduced in the 1950s combining L'Attaque, Dover Patrol and Aviation. The pieces represented fighting units (e.g. "division", "battalion", "brigade") rather than individual soldiers. The board consisted of land, ocean, rivers and lakes.
- Game of the Generals, a Philippine variety of Stratego introduced in 1973 played on a modified (8×9) chessboard
- battle for the temple, an Israeli game by Isratoys company

A capture the flag game called "Stratego" and loosely based on the board game is played at summer camps. In this game, two teams of thirty to sixty players are assigned ranks by distribution of coloured objects such as pinnies or glowsticks, the colours representing rank, not team. Players can tag and capture lower-ranked opponents, with the exception that the lowest rank captures the highest. Players who do not know their teammates may not be able to tell which team other players are on, creating incomplete information and opportunities for bluffing.

== Versions ==
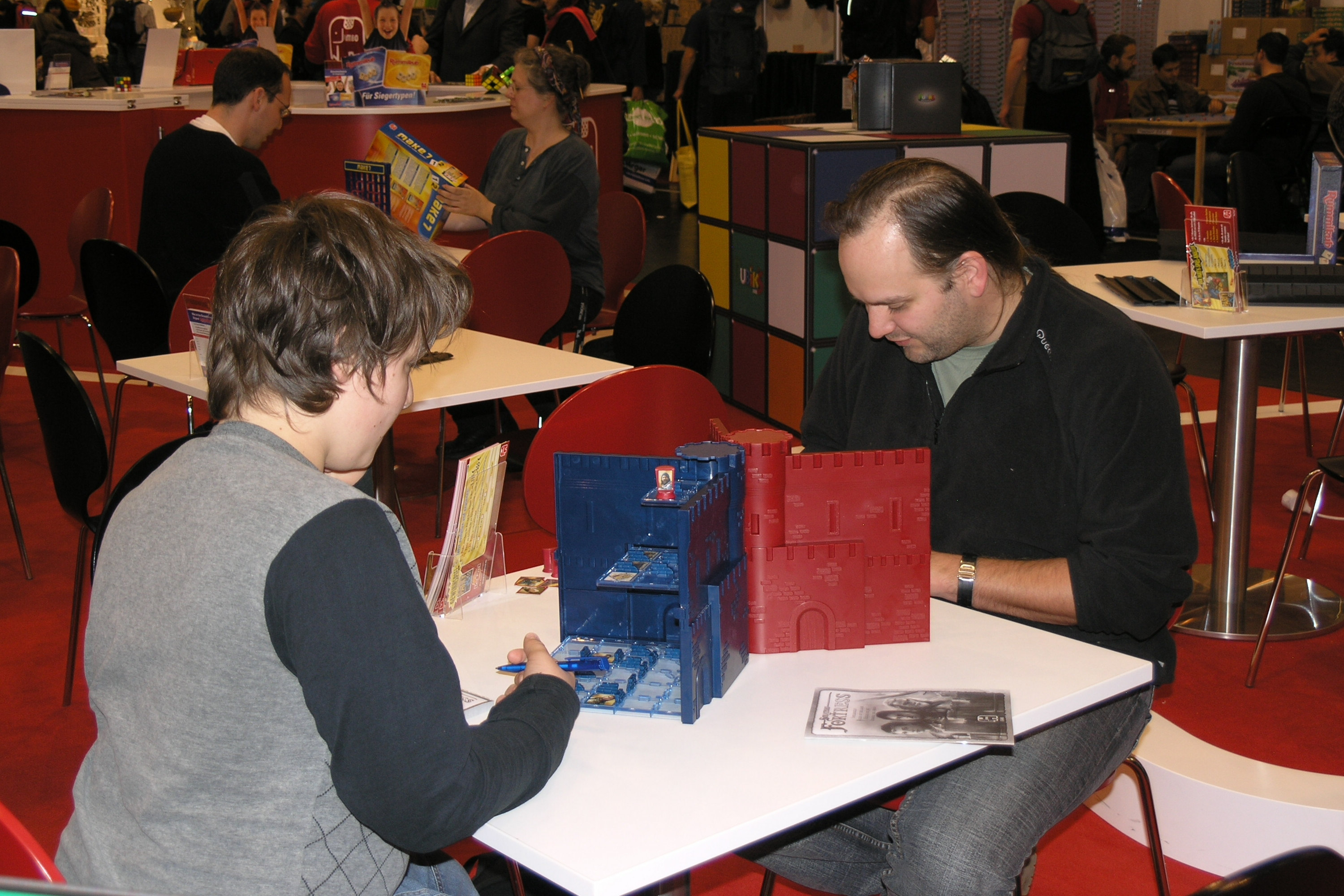
Stratego Fortress

The game remains in production, with new versions released every few years. These are a few of the notable ones. The first U.S. edition 1961 Milton Bradley set, and a special edition 1963 set called Stratego Fine, had wooden pieces. The 1961 wood pieces had a design that looked like vines scaling a castle wall on the back.

Later 1961 productions featured plastic pieces. All other regular editions had plastic pieces. A few special editions as noted below had wooden or metal pieces.

=== Classic versions ===
These have 10×10 boards, 40 pieces per side with classic pieces and rules of movement.

Official Modern Version: Also known as Stratego Original. Redesigned pieces and game art. The pieces now use stickers attached to new "castle-like" plastic pieces. The stickers must be applied by the player after purchase. Rank numbering is reversed in European style (higher numbers equals higher rank). Comes with an optional alternate piece, the Infiltrator.

Nostalgia Game Series Edition: Released 2002. Traditional stamped plastic pieces, although the metallic paint is dull and less reflective than some older versions, and the pieces are not engraved as some previous editions were. Wooden box, traditional board and piece numbering.

Stratego 50th Anniversary (2011) by Spin Master comes in both a book-style box and a cookie-tin-like metal box, with original new artwork, pieces and gameplay. It includes optional Cannons (2 per player) playing pieces.

Library Edition: Hasbro's Library Series puts what appears to be the classic Stratego of the Nostalgia Edition into a compact, book-like design. The wooden box approximates the size of a book and is made to fit in a bookcase in one's library. In this version, the scout may not move and strike in the same turn.

Michael Graves Design Stratego by Milton Bradley introduced in 2002 and sold exclusively through Target Stores. It features a finished wood box, wooden pedestal board, and closed black and white roughly wedge-shaped plastic pieces. Limited production, no longer available.

Stratego Onyx: Introduced in 2008, Stratego Onyx was sold exclusively by Barnes & Noble. It includes foil-stamped wooden game pieces and a raised gameboard with a decorative wooden frame. One-time production, no longer available.

Franklin Mint Civil War Collector's Edition: In the mid-1990s, Franklin Mint created a luxury version of Stratego with an American Civil War theme and gold- and silver-plated pieces. Due to a last-minute licensing problem, the set was never officially released and offered for sale. The only remaining copies are those sent to the company's retail stores for display.

=== Variant Versions ===
These have substantially different configurations and rules.

Ultimate Stratego: No longer in production, this version can still be found at some online stores and specialty gaming stores. This version is a variant of traditional Stratego and can accommodate up to 4 players simultaneously. The Ultimate Stratego board game contained four different Stratego versions: "Ultimate Lightning", "Alliance Campaign", "Alliance Lightning" and "Ultimate Campaign".

Science Fiction Version: Jumbo B.V. / Spin Master version of Stratego, common in North American department stores. The game has a futuristic science fiction theme. Played on a smaller 8×10 board, with 30 pieces per player. Features unique Spotter playing pieces.

Stratego Waterloo: For the bicentenary of the Battle of Waterloo in June 2015, the Dutch publishing group Jumbo published Stratego Waterloo. Instead of using ranks, the different historical units that had actually fought at the battle were added as Pawns (Old Guard, 95th Rifles...) – each with their own strengths and weaknesses. The Pawns are divided into light infantry, line infantry, light cavalry, heavy cavalry, artillery, commanders and commanders-in-chief (Wellington and Napoleon). Instead of capturing the Flag, the players must get two of their pawns on the lines of communication of their opponent.

From highest rank to lowest the pieces are:

Rank	French (Blue)		Allied (Red)			
Rank	French (Blue)		Initial forces		Prussian reinforcements (Black)	
Rank	Name	Count	Name	Count	Name	Count
8/1	Emperor Napoleon (France)	1	Duke of Wellington (Britain)	1	—N/a	
7/2	Marshal Ney (France)	1	Lord Uxbridge (Britain)	1	Field Marshal Von Bulow (Prussia)	1
6/3	Empress's Dragoons (French Imperial Guard)	2	British Royal Guards	2	—N/a	
5/4	Polish Lancers (French Imperial Guard)	4	Scots Greys & Highland Regiments (Scottish cavalry and infantry, respectively)	3	—N/a	
4/5	Cuirassiers (French Imperial Guard)	5	Dutch Carabiniers (cavalry)	3	—N/a	
3/6	French Line Infantry	15	KGL Infantry (Britain)	18	Prussian Infantry	3
2/7	Chasseurs a Cheval (French cavalry)	6	95th Rifles (British infantry) & KGL Hussars (British cavalry)	8	Silesian Landwehr (Prussian cavalry & infantry)	8
1/8	French Light Infantry	5	Brunswick Leib ("Black Infantry")	3	—N/a	
	Artillery	8	Artillery	6	Artillery	1
Totals	France	47	Allies	45	Prussia	13

The higher ranked piece always captures the lower.

Stratego Conquest: 1996, two- to four-handed game played on world map; alternate pieces cannons and cavalry

Stratego Fortress: A 3D version of Stratego featuring a 3-level fortress and mystical themed pieces and maneuvers

Fire and Ice Stratego: The Hasbro version called Fire and Ice Stratego has different pieces and rules of movement. The game features a smaller 8×10 board and each player has 30 magical and mythological themed pieces with special powers.

=== Promotional ===
Hertog Jan, a Dutch brand of beer, released Stratego Tournament, a promotional version of Stratego with variant rules. It includes substantially fewer pieces, including only one Bomb and no Miners. Since each side has only about 18 pieces, the pieces are far more mobile. The scout in this version is allowed to move three squares in any combination of directions (including L-shapes) and there is a new piece called the Archer, which is defeated by anything, but can defeat any piece other than the Bomb by shooting it from a two-square distance, in direct orthogonal, or straight, directions only. If one player is unable to move any more of his or her pieces, the game results in a tie because neither player's Flag was captured.

=== Themed ===
These variants are produced by the company with pop-culture-themed pieces licensed from their respective owners:

- The Lord of the Rings (2004)
- Star Wars (2002)
- Star Wars: The Clone Wars (2009)
- Chronicles of Narnia (2005)
- Pirates of the Caribbean (2007)
- Marvel Comics (2007)
- Transformers (2007)
- Sharpe's Attack (1996)
- Duel Masters (2004)

Produced by Avalon Hill:

- Stratego: Legends (1999)

Produced by USAopoly:

- Democrats vs Republicans Stratego (2008)
- Civil War Stratego (2007)

== Competition ==
There are now many Stratego competitions held throughout the world. The game is particularly popular in the Netherlands, Germany, Greece, USA and Belgium, where live and online championships are organized. The international Stratego scene has been dominated by players from the Netherlands and Greece from its inception to the 2020s. Stratego World Championships have been held since 1997 and continue to be held almost yearly around August.

Stratego competitions are now held in all four versions of the game:

Classic Stratego
Competitions in the original game include the "Classic Stratego World Championships", the "Classic Stratego Olympiad" and several National Championships from various different countries.

Ultimate Lightning Stratego
In this version of the game, each side has only 20 pieces. A few pieces have variant moves and there are a few rule differences. Games take only a fraction of the time needed for Classic Stratego. Competitions in this version include the "Ultimate Lightning World Championships" and the "Ultimate Lightning European Championships".

Duel Stratego
The version is played with 10 pieces per side on an 8×10 board. Competitions in this version now include the "Stratego Duel World Championships," which were held for the first time in August 2009 (Sheffield, England).

Stratego Barrage
To force decisions in knock-out stages in tournaments, in 1992 Stratego Barrage was developed by Marc Perriëns and Roel Eefting. In this "Quick-Stratego" a setup can be made in one minute and played in 5 minutes. The eight pieces with which Barrage is played are the Flag, the Marshall, the General, 1 Bomb, 1 Miner, 2 Scouts and the Spy. Since 1992 Dutch Championships and since 2000 World Championships in Barrage have been organised. Cambodian Champion is Sor Samedy, Dutch Champion (2014) is Ruben van de Built, World Champion (2013) is Tim Slagboom.

=== Tournaments ===
World Championships Stratego Classic (40 pieces)

Year	Host	Gold	Silver	Bronze
1997	(United Kingdom) London	(Netherlands) Peter van Bodegom	(Netherlands) George Franka	(Netherlands) Erik van den Berg
1998	(United Kingdom) London	(Netherlands) Luc Adriaansen	(Netherlands) Sander Rinzema	(Netherlands) Erik van den Berg
1999	(United Kingdom) London	(Netherlands) Johnny van Geffen	(Netherlands) René Helmus	(Netherlands) George Franka
2000	(United Kingdom) London	(Netherlands) Erik van den Berg	(Netherlands) André Pols	(Netherlands) Wim Snelleman
2001	(Germany) Berlin	(Netherlands) Erik van den Berg	(Netherlands) René Helmus	(Netherlands) Vincent de Boer
2002	(Netherlands) Rotterdam	(Netherlands) Erik van den Berg	(Netherlands) Dennis Baas	(Netherlands) Wim Snelleman
2003	(Austria) Vienna	(Netherlands) Vincent de Boer	(Netherlands) André Pols	(Netherlands) Wout Gulden
2004	(Belgium) Antwerp	(Netherlands) Vincent de Boer	(Netherlands) Erik van den Berg	(Netherlands) Luc Adriaansen
2005	Not held			
2006	(Belgium) Antwerp	(Netherlands) Erik van den Berg	(Netherlands) Ricardo Kik	(Germany) Mark Blockhaus
2007	(Belgium) Antwerp	(Netherlands) Vincent de Boer	(Germany) Ralf Sandkuhle	(Netherlands) Erik van den Berg
2008	(Ukraine) Kyiv	(Netherlands) Pim Niemeijer	(Netherlands) Tim Slagboom	(Netherlands) Vincent de Boer
2009	(Germany) Gladbeck	(Germany) Steffen Annies	(Netherlands) Tim Slagboom	(Netherlands) Pim Niemeijer
2010	(Netherlands) Maastricht	(Netherlands) Pim Niemeijer	(Netherlands) Tim Slagboom	(Germany) Andreas Bonnermann
2011	(United Kingdom) North Shields	(United Kingdom) Richard Ratcliffe	(Netherlands) Tim Slagboom	(Netherlands) George Franka
2012	(Netherlands) Haastrecht	(Netherlands) Pim Niemeijer	(United Kingdom) Richard Ratcliffe	(Czech Republic) Martin Ehrenberger
2013	(Germany) Berlin	(Netherlands) Tim Slagboom	(Germany) Steffen Annies	(Germany) Axel Hangg
2014	(Greece) Thessaloniki	(Netherlands) Tim Slagboom	(Netherlands) George Franka	(Netherlands) Ruben van de Bilt
2015	(Belgium) Waterloo	(Netherlands) Pim Niemeijer	(Netherlands) Johnny van Geffen	(Netherlands) Vincent de Boer
2016	(Germany) Rendsburg	(Greece) Stavros Sekertzis	(Netherlands) Tim Slagboom	(Netherlands) John Schepers
2017	(Greece) Marmari	(Netherlands) Anjo Travaille	(Netherlands) Tim Slagboom	(Greece) John Vandoros
2018	(Netherlands) Naarden	(Greece) John Vandoros	(Netherlands) Vince van Geffen	(Netherlands) Sem van Geffen
2019	(United Kingdom) Sheffield	(Netherlands) Tim Slagboom	(Netherlands) Pim Niemeijer	(United States) Angel Baron
2020	Not held due to the COVID-19 pandemic			
2021	Not held due to the COVID-19 pandemic			
2022	(Greece) Kalavryta	(Greece) Gerasimos Karelas	(Netherlands) Max Roelofs	(Netherlands) Anjo Travaille
2023	(Netherlands) Amsterdam	(Netherlands) Vince van Geffen	(Netherlands) Max Roelofs	(Netherlands) Sem van Geffen
2024	(Germany) Nüremberg	(Netherlands) Vince van Geffen	(Netherlands) Tim Slagboom	(Netherlands) Max Roelofs
2025	(Switzerland) Avenches	(Netherlands) Vince van Geffen	(Netherlands) Max Roelofs	(Netherlands) Sem van Geffen
2026	(Netherlands) Leiden	(Netherlands) Sem van Geffen	(Germany) Benjamin Roos	(Canada) Ray Manji

World Championships Stratego Juniors Classic (40 pieces)

Year	Host	Gold	Silver	Bronze
2001	(Germany) Berlin	(Netherlands) Roel Verleysdonk	(Netherlands) Thomas Kok	(Netherlands) Niels Hardorff
2002	(Netherlands) Rotterdam	(Netherlands) Roel Verleysdonk	(Netherlands) Niels Hardorff	(Netherlands) Jordy de Raef
2003	(Austria) Vienna	(Netherlands) Roel Verleysdonk	(Netherlands) Jordy de Raef	(Netherlands) Peter Verleysdonnk
2004	(Belgium) Antwerp	(Netherlands) Roel Verleysdonk	(Netherlands) Pim Niemeijer	(France) Julien Alexis
2005	Not held			
2006	(Belgium) Antwerp	(Netherlands) Peter Verleysdonk	(Netherlands) Bert Verleysdonk	(Germany) Vincent Pausch
2007	Not held			
2008	(Ukraine) Kyiv	(Ukraine) Maksym Malyshevsky	(Ukraine) Yuriy Mykhalyuk	(Ukraine) Nazariy Klyuzhnyy
2009	(Germany) Gladbeck	(Germany) Ansgar Pausch	(Belgium) Filip Andriessen	(Germany) Benedikt Abel
2010	(Netherlands) Maastricht	(Netherlands) Steven van den Enden	(Germany) Wilhelm David Weber	(Germany) Ruben Trittin
2011	(United Kingdom) North Shields	(Germany) Adrian Hangg	(Germany) Ruben Trittin	(United Kingdom) Emerson Ratcliffe
2012	(Netherlands) Haastrecht	(Germany) Simon Quinn	(Germany) Wilhelm David Weber	(Belgium) Filip Andriessen
2013	(Germany) Berlin	(Germany) Wilhelm David Weber	(Germany) Timon Abel	(Germany) Nighel Apostel
2014	(Greece) Thessaloniki	(Greece) Ioannis Takatinis	(Greece) Anastasia Takatiui	(Greece) Iosif Fragkou
2015	(Belgium) Waterloo	(Netherlands) Vince van Geffen	(Netherlands) Sem van Geffen	(Netherlands) Bram Geelhoed
2016	(Germany) Rendsburg	(Germany) Nils Abel	(Germany) Lasse Baasch	(Germany) Mads Sievers
2017	(Greece) Marmari	(Greece) Elissaios Vandoros	(Greece) Ernestos Pilalis	(Greece) Filippos Mpanitsiotis
2018	(Netherlands) Naarden	(Netherlands) Thomas Geelhoed	(Netherlands) Daniel Geelhoed	(United Kingdom) Woody Melbourne
2019	(United Kingdom) Sheffield	(United Kingdom) Woody Melbourne	(United Kingdom) Elly Melbourne	(Belgium) Alexander de Almeida
2020	Not held due to the COVID-19 pandemic			
2021	Not held due to the COVID-19 pandemic			
2022	(Greece) Kalavryta	(Greece) Phaedon Kougiemitros	(Greece) Ermis Metaxas-Mariatos	(Greece) Evangelia Arkoumani
2023	Not held			
2024	(Germany) Nüremberg	(Austria) Lio Birnbaumer	(Germany) Ilyan Jánváry	(Germany) Andor Jánváry

World Championships Stratego Barrage (8 pieces)

Year	Host	Gold	Silver	Bronze
2006	(United Kingdom) London	(Netherlands) Roel Eefting	(United Kingdom) Richard Ratcliffe	(Netherlands) Dennis Baas
2007	Not held			
2008	(United Kingdom) London	(United Kingdom) Richard Ratcliffe	(United Kingdom) Chris Sergeant	(United Kingdom) Luke Daniels
2009	Not held			
2010	Not held			
2011	(United Kingdom) Newcastle	(United Kingdom) Richard Ratcliffe	(Netherlands) Kees de Vos	(Netherlands) Mark Baardman
2012	Not held			
2013	Not held			
2014	(Greece) Thessaloniki	(Netherlands) Ruben van de Bilt	(United Kingdom) Richard Ratcliffe	(Netherlands) Theo Gerrits
2015	(Belgium) Waterloo	(Germany) Axel Hangg	(Netherlands) Pim Niemeijer	(Netherlands) David Bouten
2016	Not held			
2017	Not held			
2018	(Netherlands) Naarden	(Netherlands) Pim Niemeijer	(Germany) Axel Hangg	(Netherlands) Roel Eefting
2019	(United Kingdom) Sheffield	(United Kingdom) Richard Ratcliffe	(United States) Angel Baron	(Netherlands) Dennis Baas
2020	Not held due to the COVID-19 pandemic			
2021	Not held due to the COVID-19 pandemic			
2022	(Greece) Kalavryta	(Netherlands) Pim Niemeijer	(Netherlands) Dennis Baas	(Greece) Gerasimos Karelas
2023	(Netherlands) Amsterdam	(Switzerland) Sébastien Crot	(United Kingdom) Joshua Critchlow	(Germany) Axel Hangg
2024	(Germany) Nüremberg	(Germany) Axel Hangg	(Germany) Nils Tiedemann	(Germany) Yannick Müller
2025	(Switzerland) Avenches	(Switzerland) Sébastien Crot	(Greece) Dimitris Karamanis	(Germany) Nils Tiedemann
2026	(Netherlands) Leiden	(Germany) Adrian Hangg	(Greece) Dimitrios Kosmopoulos	(Canada) Ray Manji

Other tournaments

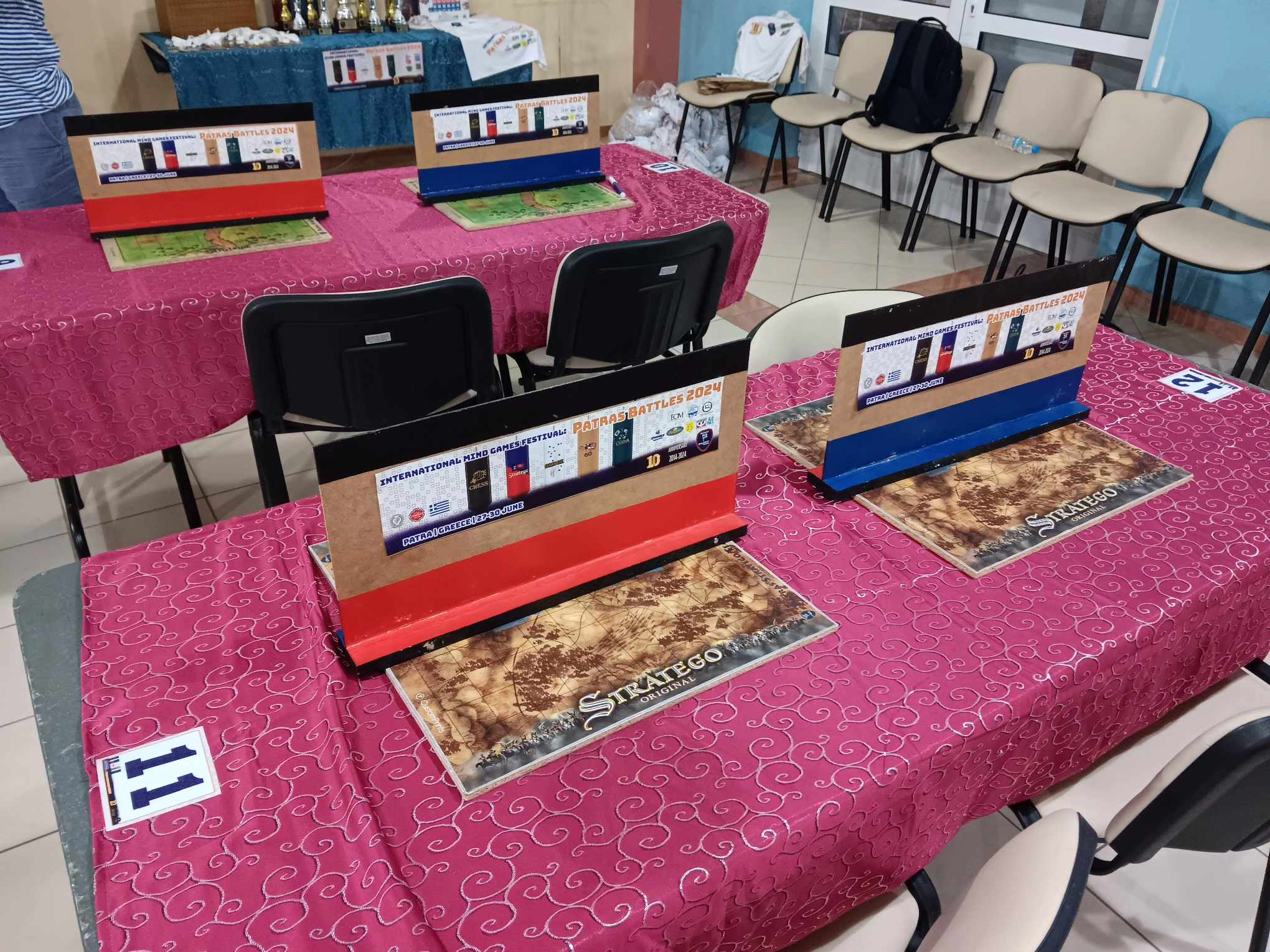
Stratego boards set at the 2024 Patras Battles tournament.

- 1991 First Dutch Championship. In 1991 the first Dutch Stratego Championship was being organized by Johan van der Wielen, Roel Eefting and Marc Perriëns. One hundred and eight players participated in this event in Nijmegen. Wim Snelleman was the winner. Several Dutch Championships would follow.
- 1997 First Cambodian Championship. In 1997 Cambodia had the scoop to be the first Asian country in which its national Classic Stratego Championship was being organized. Organizer Roel Eefting defeated runner-up Max van Wel.
- 1998 Second Cambodian Championship. In 1998 Roel Eefting surprisingly lost his title to fellow Dutchman Marc Nickel (Derks), who ironically was invited by him on a journey together through Cambodia.
- 2007 World Team Cup. The World Team cup is played annually at the World Championships. It is a four player event with teams competing for their country. Holland defeated Germany in the 2007 World Team Cup.
- 2007 Stratego Olympiad. The 2007 Stratego Olympiad was held as part of the list of events within the Mind Sports Olympics. The 2007 event was held near London, England on 25 and 26 August 2007. Roel Eefting won both the event and the World Title on Barrage (Quick-Stratego which is played with 8 pieces).
- 2007 Stratego World Team Championship. The Stratego World Team Championship is held as part of the events at the Mind Sports Olympics. This event is a three player event with teams competing for their country. Great Britain defeated Holland in the 2007 World Team Championships.
- 2007 Computer Stratego World Championship. StrategoUSA conducted the first open tournament ever held for Stratego AI programs during December 2007. Programs played Classic Stratego rules in a round robin format. The tournament was a demonstration of state-of-the-art Stratego AI, with the hope it would spur new research into Stratego AI methodology. The winning program was Probe, which finished with a record of 17–0–3 (W–L–D).
- 2008 Computer Stratego World Championship. The 2008 tournament was held during December with six programs participating. Once again, StrategoUSA hosted the tournament online. Probe repeated as the champion, with a record of 22–3–0 (W–L–D).
- 2009 Computer Stratego World Championship. The 2009 tournament was held in December. Once again, StrategoUSA hosted the tournament online. The winner was Master of the Flag II, with a record of 30–3–2 (W–L–D).
- 2010 Stratego World Championship. The 2010 tournament was held in August, in Maastricht, Netherlands, Pim Neimejer (Netherlands) won the World Championship (overall score). Lady Kathryn Whitehorn (England) won the Women's Stratego World Championship. In team play, The Netherlands National Team won Gold (first), Germany Silver (second), and England Bronze (third).
- 2010 Computer Stratego World Championship. The 2010 tournament was held in December. Once again, StrategoUSA hosted the tournament online. The winner was Probe, with a record of 24–3–3 (W–L–D).
- 2016 - today Patras Battles. Since 2016 almost every year in Patras the local team Patras Stratego Team organizes this international tournament inviting the best players from all over the world.

== See also ==
- List of abstract strategy games
- Game complexity
