= WTRX =

Sports radio station in Flint, Michigan

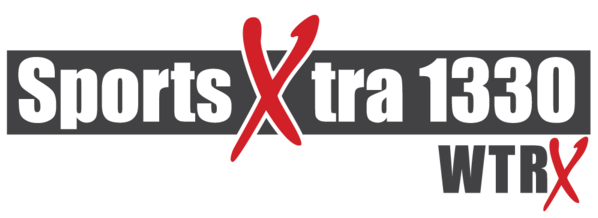
- Flint, Michigan; United States
- Frequency: 1330 kHz
- Branding: Sports XTRA 1330

Programming
- Format: Defunct (was Sports)
- Affiliations: Infinity Sports Network; Michigan Wolverines

Ownership
- Owner: Cumulus Media; (Radio License Holding CBC, LLC)
- Sister stations: WDZZ; WFBE; WWCK; WWCK-FM

History
- First air date: October 1, 1947 (as WBBC)
- Last air date: March 29, 2025
- Former call signs: WBBC (1947–1960); WTRX (1960–1989); WDLZ (1989–1990)

Technical information
- Licensing authority: FCC
- Facility ID: 15768
- Class: B
- Power: 5,000 watts day; 1,000 watts night
- Transmitter coordinates: 42°58′25.1″N 83°38′59.8″W

Links
- Public license information: Public file; LMS

WTRX (1330 AM, "Sports XTRA 1330") was a radio station in Flint, Michigan. Until going silent in March 2025, WTRX was a sports radio station and the Flint affiliate for Michigan Wolverines football and men's basketball, and Infinity Sports Network.

WTRX's studios were located in Mundy Township near U.S. 23 and Hill Rd. and its transmitter was in Burton at 3076 East Bristol Road near Dort Hwy. WFBE continues transmissions from the former WTRX facility.

== History ==
The station began broadcasting October 13, 1947, under the WBBC call sign. It was owned by Booth Radio Stations, Incorporated and was a Mutual affiliate. WBBC was also briefly a CBS Radio affiliate in 1959, after WJR in Detroit briefly dropped its CBS affiliation to become an independent. In 1960, WBBC was purchased by Robert E. Eastman, who changed the call letters to WTRX and installed a Top 40 format to compete with WTAC. By early 1968, the station had evolved into an adult contemporary (or "bright MOR" as then-station manager Johnny Nogaj described it in Billboard) format, which lasted for the next 21 years. During this time, the station was also an affiliate of American Top 40, until 1986 when the show moved to Saginaw-based WIOG on its new 102.5 MHz frequency.

In 1989, the station was auctioned at Flint Hyatt Regency where David Lee Shure a Flint area businessman won the bid on the station and property. Days after the paperwork was filed it became an affiliate of Satellite Music Network's Z-Rock format as WDLZ. The station subsequently failed, largely due to the downward spiral in the local economy and the migration of many AM stations in the area to non-music formats.

After a period of silence after WDLZ went off the air in 1990, WTRX came back on the air with its legendary call sign restored, but with no original programming. WTRX spent the first few years simulcasting Bay City station WMAX's sports radio format until it established its own sports programming in 1996.

In 2001, WTRX's studio was moved from its transmitter location on Bristol Road in Burton to the studios and offices of co-owned WFBE on Miller Road in Flint Township.

Cumulus Media purchased WTRX in 2011. It relocated its studios and offices to 6317 Taylor Drive in Mundy Township in March 2012. In addition to its Flint sister stations, WTRX's other sister stations in the Flint/Tri-Cities area were WHNN, WIOG, WKQZ and WILZ, all licensed to the Tri-Cities; of the four, only WHNN and WIOG also cover the Flint area under normal listening conditions.

Cumulus Media suspended operations of the station on March 29, 2025. The license was cancelled on March 26, 2026. The WTRX callsign has since been recycled within the Smile FM network and effective April 15, 2026, has been applied to a station formerly known as WKKM, on 91.5 MHz licensed to Speaker Township, MI, in southwestern Sanilac County.
