= WMRP =

WMRP may refer to:

- WMRP-LP, a radio station in Mundy Township, Michigan with an oldies format
- WWCK-FM, an AM radio station in Flint, Michigan that held the WMRP call letters from 1964 until 1971.
- WWCK (AM), an AM radio station in Flint, Michigan that held the WMRP call letters from 1946 until 1971.
