= WWCK =

WWCK refers to a pair of radio stations in Flint, Michigan:

- WWCK (AM), (1570 AM), "K 107.3", a classic hits music station
- WWCK-FM, (105.5 FM), "CK 105.5", a top 40 music station
