= Flint, Michigan =

City in Michigan, United States

Flint
- City
- City of Flint
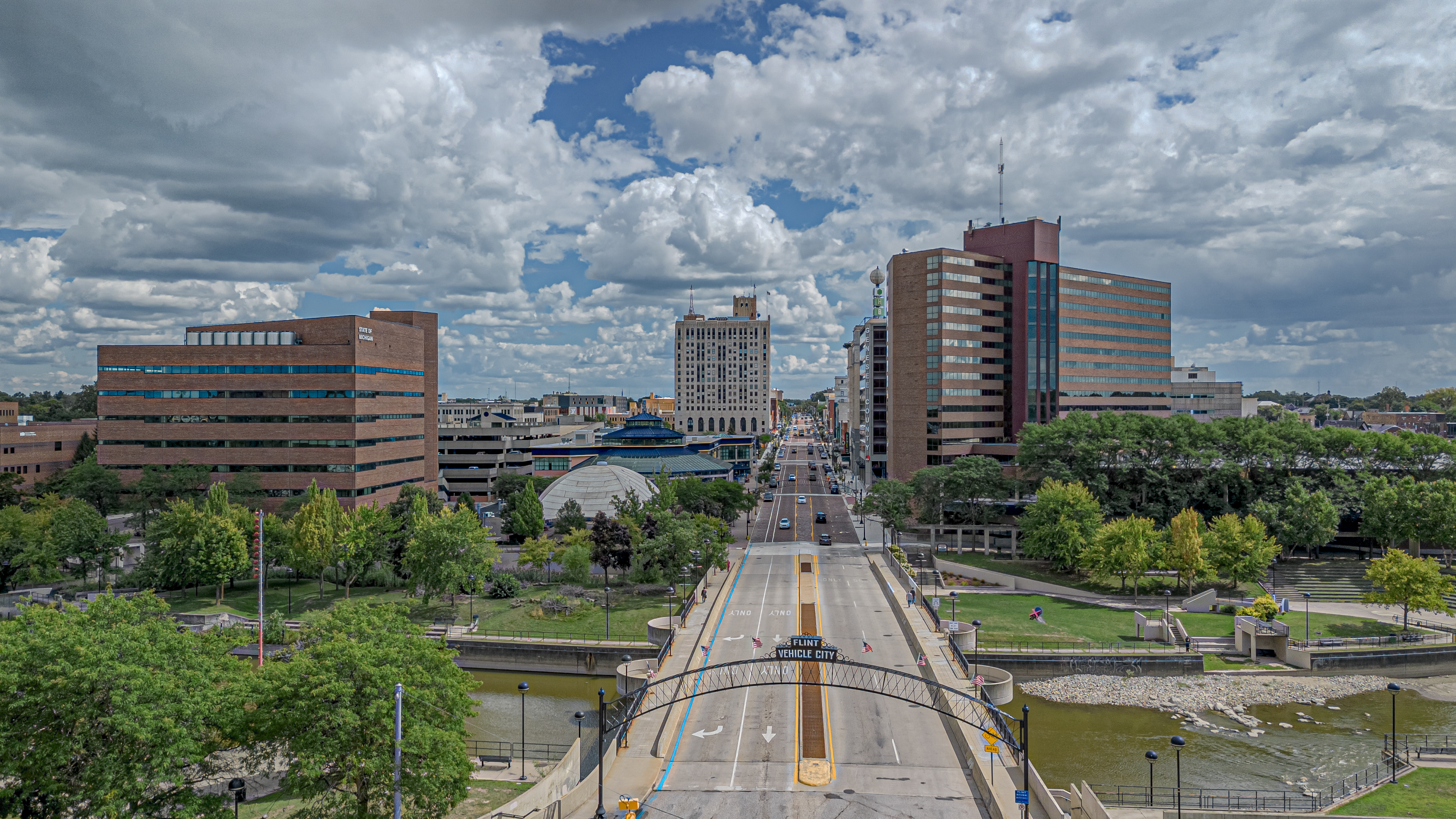
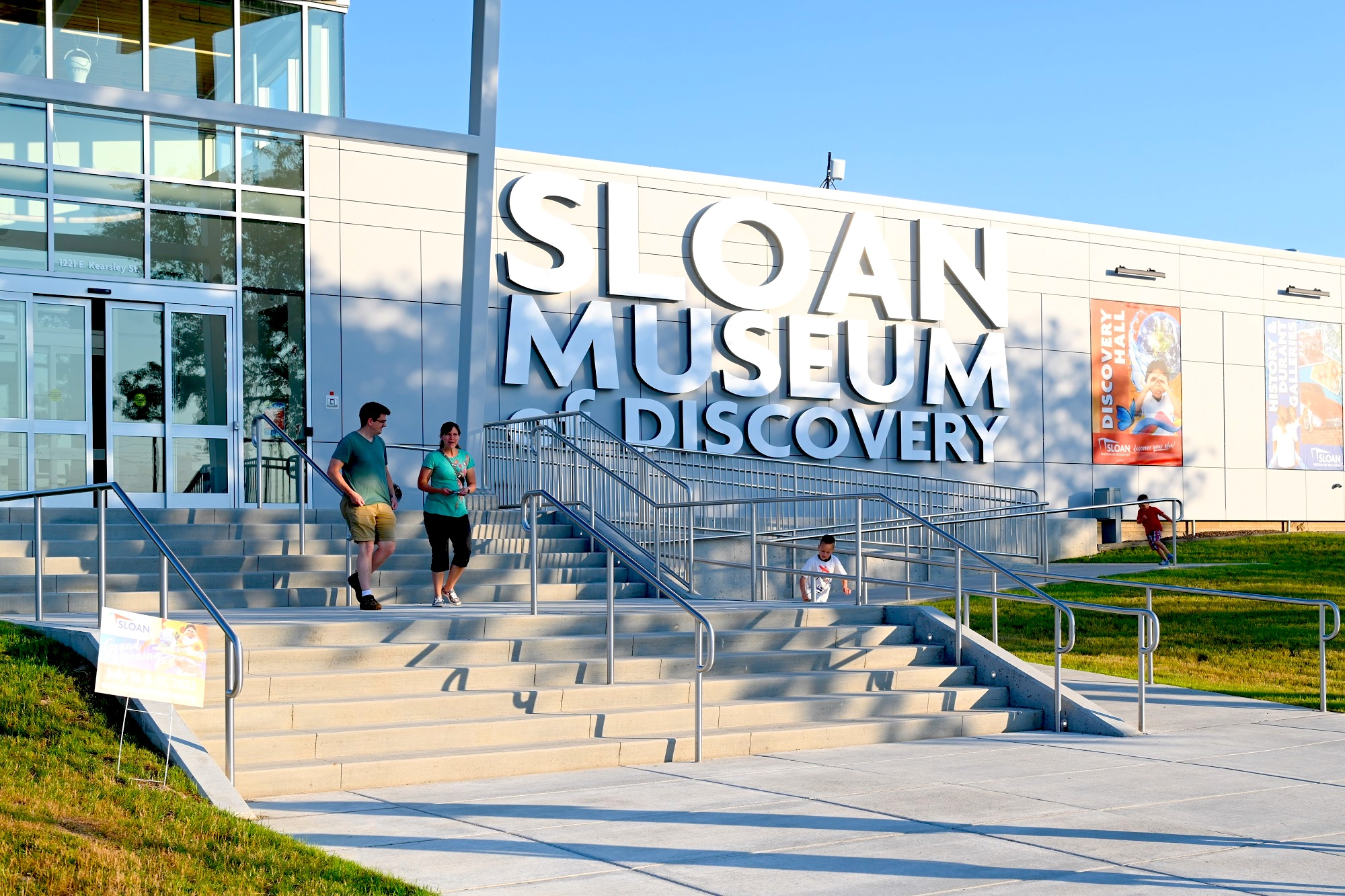
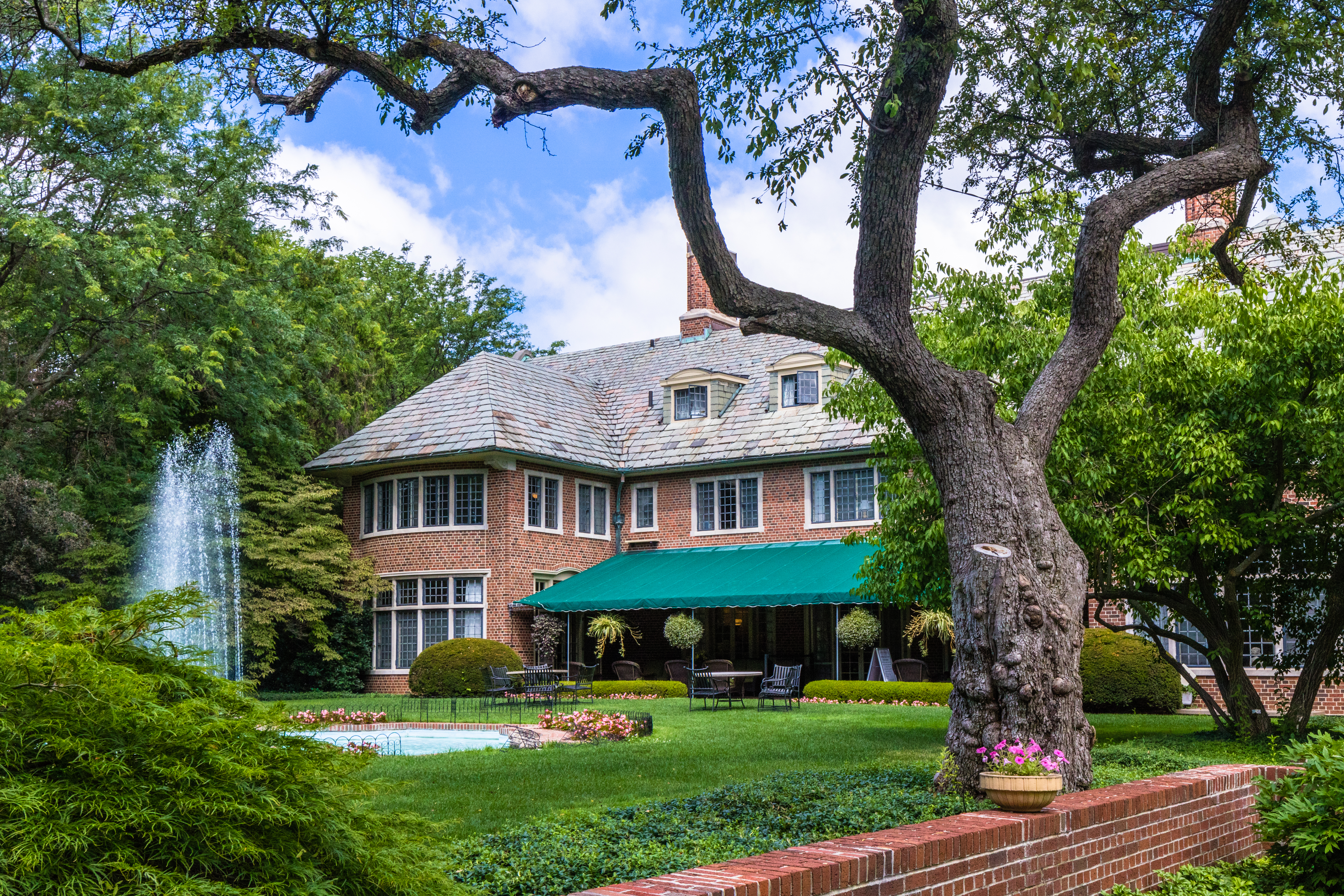
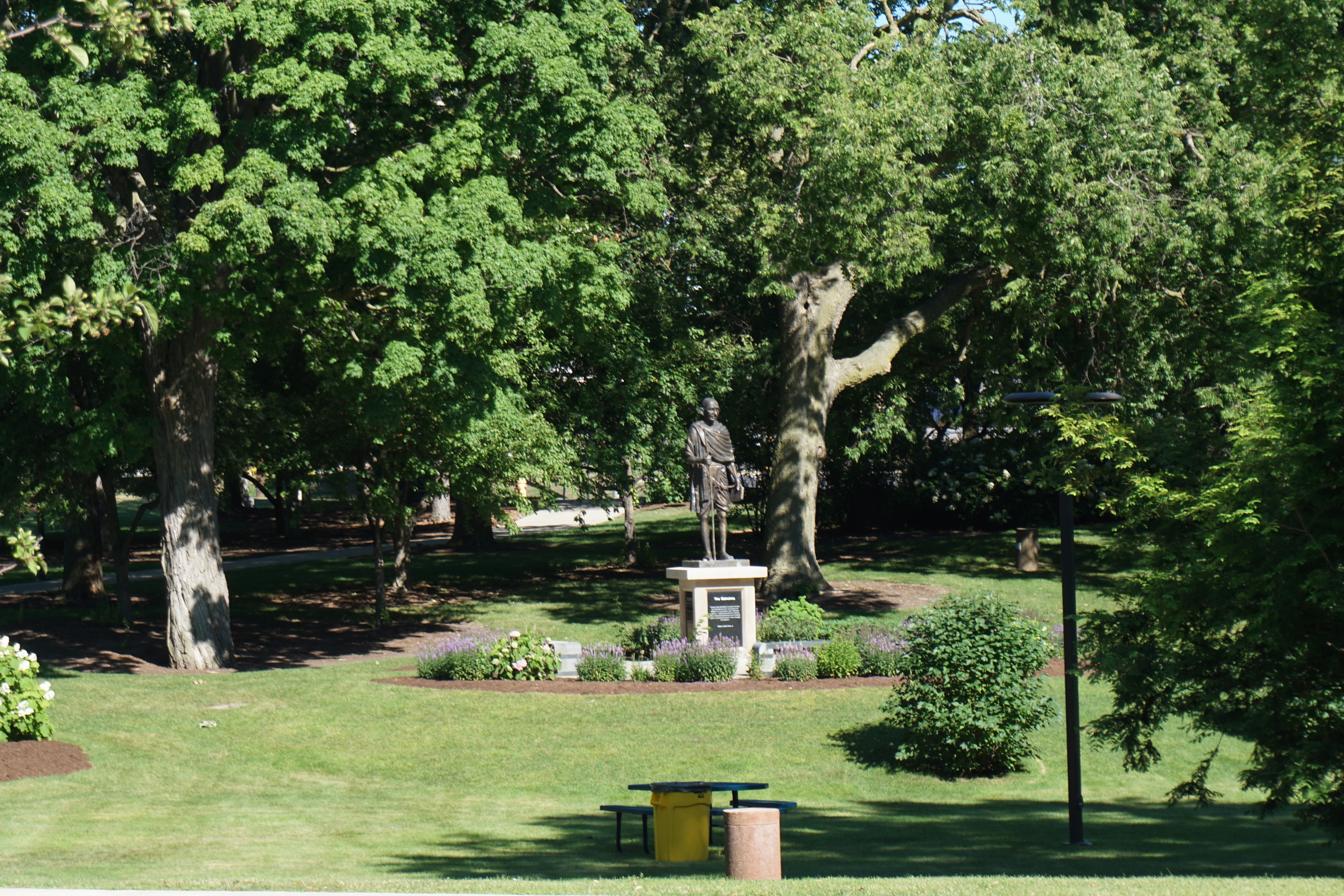
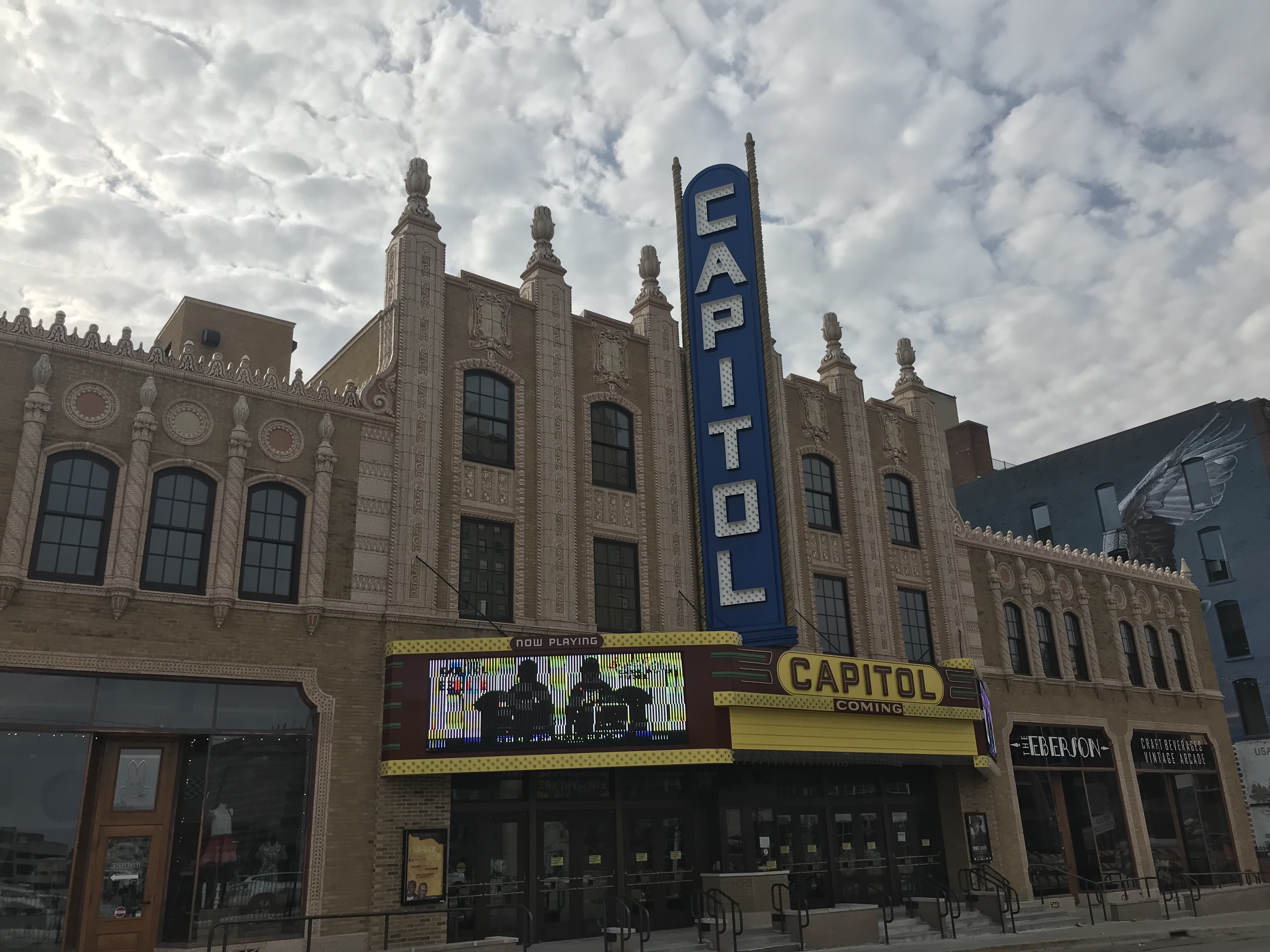
- Downtown Flint Sloan Museum Applewood Estate Willson Park Capitol Theatre

- Flag Seal
- Nicknames: Vehicle City (official); Flint Town (unofficial)
- Motto(s): "Strong and Proud"
- Interactive map of Flint
- Location within Michigan Location within the United States
- Coordinates: 43°1′8″N 83°41′36″W
- Country: United States
- State: Michigan
- County: Genesee
- Settled: 1819
- Organized (Flint Township): March 2, 1836
- Incorporated (city): 1855
- Founder: Jacob Smith

Government
  - Type: Mayor–council
  - Mayor: Sheldon Neeley (D)
  - City Administrator’s Office: Clyde D. Edwards, MSA
  - Councilmembers: 1. Leon El-Alamin (NP); 2. Ladel Lewis (D); 3. Lashawn Johnson (NP); 4. Judy Priestley (R); 5. Jerri Winfrey-Carter (D); 6. Tonya Burns (D); 7. Candice Mushatt (D); 8. Dennis Pfeiffer (NP); 9. Jonathan Jarrett (NP)

Area
  - City: 34.105 sq mi (88.332 km^{2})
  - Land: 33.440 sq mi (86.610 km^{2})
  - Water: 0.665 sq mi (1.722 km^{2}) 1.95%
  - Urban: 205.44 sq mi (532.10 km^{2})
  - Metro: 637.07 sq mi (1,650.00 km^{2})
- Elevation: 750 ft (230 m)

Population (2020)
  - City: 81,252
  - Estimate (2024): 79,735
  - Rank: US: 467th MI: 12th
  - Density: 2,384.3/sq mi (920.59/km^{2})
  - Urban: 298,964 (US: 134th)
  - Urban density: 1,455/sq mi (561.8/km^{2})
  - Metro: 402,279 (US: 138th)
  - Metro density: 632/sq mi (243.9/km^{2})
- Demonym: Flintstone
- Time zone: UTC–5 (Eastern (EST))
  - Summer (DST): UTC–4 (EDT)
- ZIP Codes: 48501–48507, 48509, 48519, 48529, 48531–48532, 48550–48557
- Area code: 810
- FIPS code: 26-29000
- GNIS feature ID: 0626170
- Website: cityofflint.com

Flint is a city in and the county seat of Genesee County, Michigan, United States. The city's population was 81,252 at the 2020 census, and was estimated to be 79,735 in 2024, making it the most populous city in Genesee County and the 12th-most populous city in Michigan. Located along the Flint River 66 miles (106 km) northwest of Detroit, it is a principal city within the Central Michigan region. The Flint metropolitan area is located entirely within Genesee County and is the fourth-largest metro area in Michigan, with a population of 406,892 in the 2020 census.

Flint was founded as a village by fur trader Jacob Smith in 1819 and became a major lumbering area on the historic Saginaw Trail during the 19th century. The city was incorporated in 1855. From the late 19th century to the mid-20th century, the city was a leading manufacturer of carriages and later automobiles, earning it the nickname "Vehicle City". General Motors (GM) was founded in Flint in 1908, and the city grew into an automobile manufacturing powerhouse for GM's Buick and Chevrolet divisions, especially after World War II up until the early 1980s recession. Flint was also the home of a sit-down strike in 1936–37 that played a vital role in the formation of the United Auto Workers.

Since the late 1960s, Flint has faced several crises. The city experienced an economic downturn after GM significantly downsized its workforce in the area from a high of 80,000 in 1978 to under 8,000 by 2010. From 1960 to 2010, the population of the city nearly halved, from 196,940 to 102,434. In the mid-2000s, Flint became known for its comparatively high crime rates and has repeatedly been ranked among the most dangerous cities in the United States according to crime statistics; however, Flint has seen a dramatic decline in homicides and crime as of November 2026. The city was under a state of financial emergency from 2002 to 2004 and again from 2011 to 2015.

From 2014 to 2019, Flint faced a public health emergency due to lead contamination in parts of the local water supply as well as an outbreak of Legionnaires' disease. The acute lead crisis has been addressed as the city has secured a new source of clean water, installed modern copper pipes to nearly every home, and distributed filters to all residents who want them. However, a legacy of distrust in public authorities remains.

== History ==
The region was home to several Ojibwe tribes at the start of the 19th century, with a particularly significant community established near present-day Montrose. The Flint River had several convenient fords which became points of contention among rival tribes, as attested by the presence of nearby arrowheads and burial mounds. Some of the city currently resides atop ancient Ojibwe burial grounds.

=== 19th century: lumber and the beginnings of the automobile industry ===
In 1819, Jacob Smith, a fur trader on cordial terms with both the local Ojibwe and the territorial government, founded a trading post at the Grand Traverse of the Flint River. On several occasions, Smith negotiated land exchanges with the Ojibwe on behalf of the U.S. government, and he was highly regarded on both sides. Smith apportioned many of his holdings to his children. As the ideal stopover on the overland route between Detroit and Saginaw, Flint grew into a small but prosperous village and incorporated in 1855. The 1860 U.S. census indicated that Genesee County had a population of 22,498 of Michigan's 750,000.

In the latter half of the 19th century, Flint became a center of the Michigan lumber industry. Revenue from lumber funded the establishment of a local carriage-making industry. As horse-drawn carriages gave way to the automobiles, Flint then naturally grew into a major player in the nascent auto industry. Buick Motor Company, after a rudimentary start in Detroit, soon moved to Flint. AC Spark Plug originated in Flint. These were followed by several now-defunct automobile marques such as the Dort, Little, Flint, and Mason brands. Chevrolet's first (and for many years, main) manufacturing facility was also in Flint, although the Chevrolet headquarters were in Detroit. For a brief period, all Chevrolets and Buicks were built in Flint.

The first Ladies' Library Association in Michigan was started in Flint in 1851 in the home of Maria Smith Stockton, daughter of the founder of the community. This library, initially private, is considered the precursor of the current Flint Public Library.

=== Early and mid-20th century: the auto industry takes shape ===
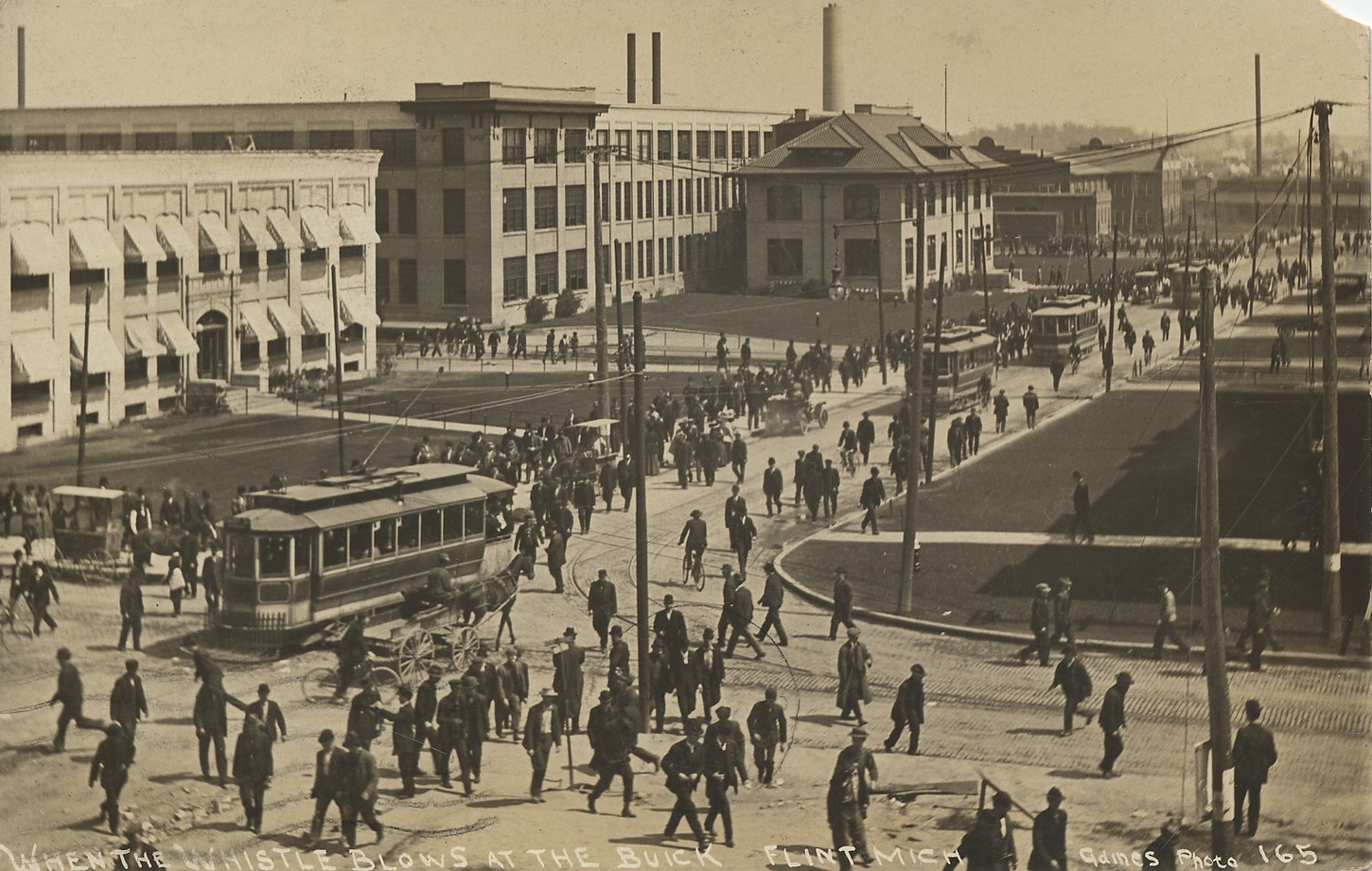
Buick factory complex in Flint, 1912

Saginaw Street in the early 20th century

In 1904, local entrepreneur William C. Durant was brought in to manage Buick, which became the largest manufacturer of automobiles by 1908. In 1908, Durant founded General Motors (GM), filing incorporation papers in New Jersey, with headquarters in Flint. GM moved its headquarters to Detroit in the mid-1920s. Durant lost control of GM twice during his lifetime. On the first occasion, he befriended Louis Chevrolet and founded Chevrolet, which was a runaway success. He used the capital from this success to buy back share control. He later lost decisive control again, permanently. Durant experienced financial ruin in the stock market crash of 1929 and subsequently ran a bowling alley in Flint until the time of his death in 1947.

The city's mayors were targeted for recall twice, Mayor David R. Cuthbertson in 1924 and Mayor William H. McKeighan in 1927. Recall supporters in both cases were jailed by the police. Cuthbertson had angered the Ku Klux Klan (KKK) by the appointment of a Catholic police chief. The KKK led the recall effort and supported Judson Transue, Cuthbertson's elected successor. Transue however did not remove the police chief. McKeighan survived his recall only to face conspiracy charges in 1928. McKeighan was under investigation for a multitude of crimes which angered city leaders enough to push for changes in the city charter.

In 1928, the city adopted a new city charter with a council-manager form of government. Subsequently, McKeighan ran the "Green Slate" of candidates who won in 1931 and 1932 and he was select as mayor in 1931. In 1935, the city residents approved a charter amendment establishing the Civil Service Commission.

For the last century, Flint's history has been dominated by both the auto industry and car culture. The Sit-Down Strike of 1936–1937 saw the fledgling United Automobile Workers triumph over General Motors and establish itself as a major union, leading to widespread unionization in US industry. The successful mediation of the strike by Governor Frank Murphy, culminating in a one-page agreement recognizing the Union and rehiring workers fired due to strike participation began an era of successful organizing by the UAW. The city was a major contributor of tanks and other war machines during World War II due to its extensive manufacturing facilities. For decades, Flint remained politically significant as a major population center as well as for its importance to the automotive industry.

A freighter named after the city, the SS City of Flint, was the first US ship to be captured during the Second World War, in October 1939. The vessel was later sunk in 1943. On June 8, 1953, the Flint-Beecher tornado, a large F5 tornado, struck the city, killing 116 people, making it the most deadly tornado in Michigan history.

The city's population peaked in 1960 at almost 200,000, at which time it was the second largest city in the state. The decades of the 1950s and 1960s are seen as the height of Flint's prosperity and influence. They culminated with the establishment of many local institutions, most notably the Flint Cultural Center. This landmark remains one of the city's chief commercial and artistic draws to this day. The city's Bishop International Airport was the busiest in Michigan for United Airlines apart from Detroit Metropolitan Airport, with flights to many destinations in the Mid-West and the Mid-Atlantic.

=== Late 20th century: deindustrialization and demographic changes ===
Since the late 1960s through the end of the 20th century, Flint has suffered from disinvestment, deindustrialization, depopulation and urban decay, as well as high rates of crime, unemployment and poverty. Initially, this took the form of white flight that afflicted many urban industrialized American towns and cities. Given Flint's role in the automotive industry, this decline was exacerbated by the 1973 oil crisis with spiking oil prices and the U.S. auto industry's subsequent loss of market share to imports, as Japanese manufacturers were producing cars with better fuel economy.

In the 1980s, the rate of deindustrialization accelerated again with local GM employment falling from a 1978 high of 80,000 to under 8,000 by 2010. Only 10% of the manufacturing work force from its height remains in Flint. Many factors have been blamed, including outsourcing, offshoring, increased automation, and moving jobs to non-union facilities in right to work states and foreign countries.

This decline was highlighted in the film Roger & Me by Michael Moore (the title refers to Roger B. Smith, the CEO of General Motors during the 1980s). Also highlighted in Moore's documentary was the failure of city officials to reverse the trends with entertainment options (e.g. the now-demolished AutoWorld) during the 1980s. Moore, a native of Davison (a Flint suburb), revisited Flint in his later movies, including Bowling for Columbine, Fahrenheit 9/11, and Fahrenheit 11/9.

=== 21st century ===
==== First financial emergency: 2002–2004 ====
By 2002, Flint had accrued $30 million in debt. On March 5, 2002, the city's voters recalled Mayor Woodrow Stanley. On May 22, Governor John Engler declared a financial emergency in Flint, and on July 8 the state appointed an emergency financial manager, Ed Kurtz. The emergency financial manager displaced the temporary mayor, Darnell Earley, in the city administrator position.

In August 2002, city voters elected former Mayor James Rutherford to finish the remainder of Stanley's term of office. On September 24, Kurtz commissioned a salary and wage study for top city officials from an outside accounting and consulting firm. The financial manager then installed a new code enforcement program for annual rental inspections and emergency demolitions. On October 8, Kurtz ordered cuts in pay for the mayor (from $107,000 to $24,000) and the City Council members (from $23,000 to $18,000). He also eliminated insurance benefits for most officials. After spending $245,000 fighting the takeover, the City Council ended the lawsuits on October 14. Immediately thereafter on October 16, a new interim financial plan was put in place by the manager. This plan initiated controls on hiring, overnight travel and spending by city employees. On November 12, Kurtz directed the city's retirement board to stop unusual pension benefits, which had decreased some retiree pensions by 3.5%. Kurtz sought the return of overpayments to the pension fund. However, in December, the state attorney general stated that emergency financial managers do not have authority over the retirement system. With contract talks stalled, Kurtz stated that there either need to be cuts or layoffs to union employees. That same month, the city's recreation centers were temporarily closed.

Emergency measures continued in 2003. In May, Kurtz increased water and sewer bills by 11% and shut down operations of the ombudsman's office. In September, a 4% pay cut was agreed to by the city's largest union. In October, Kurtz moved in favor of infrastructure improvements, authorizing $1 million in sewer and road projects. Don Williamson was elected a full-term mayor and sworn in on November 10. In December, city audits reported nearly $14 million in reductions in the city deficit. For the 2003–2004 budget year, estimates decreased that amount to between $6 million and $8 million.

With pressure from Kurtz for large layoffs and replacement of the board on February 17, 2004, the City Retirement Board agreed to four proposals reducing the amount of the city's contribution into the system. On March 24, Kurtz indicated that he would raise the City Council's and the mayor's pay, and in May, Kurtz laid off 10 workers as part of 35 job cuts for the 2004–05 budget. In June 2004, Kurtz reported that the financial emergency was over.

==== Redevelopment ====
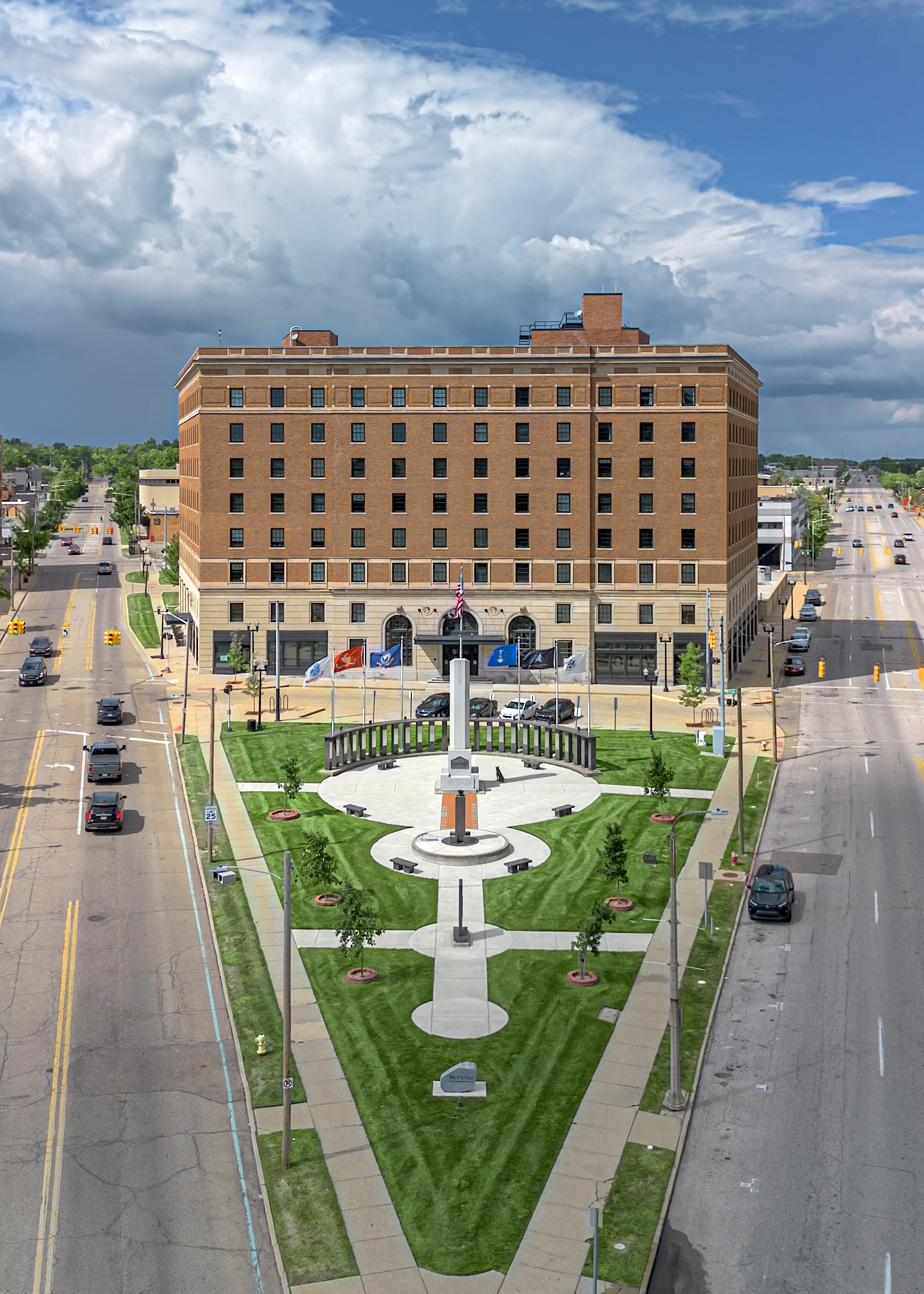
The Durant, built in 1919

In November 2013, American Cast Iron Pipe Company, a Birmingham, Alabama, based company, became the first to build a production facility in Flint's former Buick City site, purchasing the property from the RACER Trust. Commercially, local organizations have attempted to pool their resources in the central business district and to expand and bolster higher education at four local institutions. Examples of their efforts include the following:

- Landmarks such as the First National Bank building have been extensively renovated, often to create lofts or office space, and filming for the Will Ferrell movie Semi-Pro resulted in renovations to the Capitol Theatre.
- The Paterson Building at Saginaw and Third street. The building is rich in Art Deco throughout the interior and exterior. The building also houses its own garage in the lower level.
- In 2004, University Park, the first planned residential community in Flint in over 30 years, was built north of Fifth Avenue off Saginaw Street, Flint's main thoroughfare.
- Local foundations have funded the renovation and redecoration of Saginaw Street and have begun work turning University Avenue (formerly known as Third Avenue) into a mile-long "University Corridor" connecting University of Michigan–Flint with Kettering University.
- Atwood Stadium, located on University Avenue, received extensive renovations, and the Cultivating Our Community project landscaped 16 different locations as a part of a $415,600 beautification project.
- Wade Trim and Rowe Incorporated made major renovations to transform empty downtown Flint blocks into business, entertainment, and housing centers. WNEM-TV, a television station based in Saginaw, uses space in the Wade Trim building facing Saginaw Street as a secondary studio and newsroom.
- The long-vacant Durant Hotel, formerly owned by the United Hotels Company, was turned into a mixture of commercial space and apartments intended to attract young professionals or college students, with 93 units.
- In March 2008, the Crim Race Foundation put up an offer to buy the vacant Character Inn and turn it into a fitness center and do a multimillion-dollar renovation.

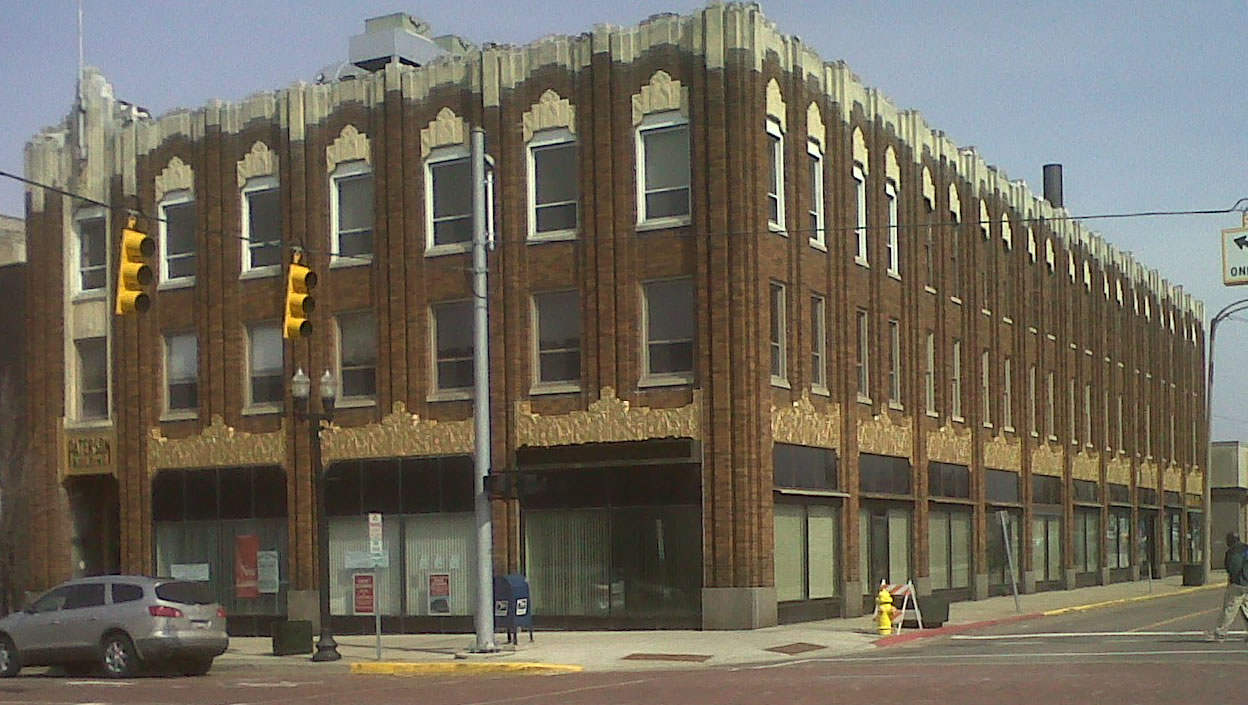
The Paterson Building

Similar to a plan in Detroit, Flint is in the process of tearing down thousands of abandoned homes to create available real estate. As of June 2009, approximately 1,100 homes have been demolished in Flint, with one official estimating another 3,000 more will have to be torn down.

==== Second financial emergency: 2011–2015 ====
On September 30, 2011, Governor Rick Snyder appointed an eight-member team to review Flint's financial state with a request to report back in 30 days (half the legal time for a review). On November 8, Mayor Dayne Walling defeated challenger Darryl Buchanan 8,819 votes (56%) to 6,868 votes (44%). That same day, the Michigan State review panel declared Flint to be in a state of a "local government financial emergency" recommending the state again appoint an emergency manager. On November 14, the City Council voted 7 to 2 to not appeal the state review with Mayor Walling concurring the next day. Governor Snyder appointed Michael Brown as the city's emergency manager. On December 2, Brown dismissed a number of top administrators. Pay and benefits from Flint's elected officials were automatically removed. On December 8, the office of ombudsman and the Civil Service Commission were eliminated by Brown.

On January 16, 2012, protestors against the emergency manager law including Flint residents marched near the governor's home. The next day, Brown filed a financial and operating plan with the state as mandated by law. The next month, each ward in the city had a community engagement meeting hosted by Brown. Governor Snyder on March 7 made a statewide public safety message from Flint City Hall that included help for Flint with plans for reopening the Flint lockup and increasing state police patrols in Flint.

On March 20, 2012, days after a lawsuit was filed by labor union AFSCME, and a restraining order was issued against Brown, his appointment was found to be in violation of the Michigan Open Meetings Act, and Mayor Walling and the City Council had their powers returned. The state immediately filed an emergency appeal, claiming the financial emergency still existed. On March 26, the appeal was granted, putting Brown back in power. Brown and several unions agreed to new contract terms in April. Brown unveiled his fiscal year 2013 budget on April 23. It included cuts in nearly every department including police and fire, as well as higher taxes. An Obsolete Property Rehabilitation District was created by Manager Brown in June 2012 for 11 downtown Flint properties. On July 19, the city pension system was transferred to the Municipal Employees Retirement System by the city's retirement board which led to a legal challenge.

On August 3, 2012, the Michigan Supreme Court ordered the state Board of Canvassers to certify a referendum on Public Act 4, the Emergency Manager Law, for the November ballot. Brown made several actions on August 7 including placing a $6 million public safety millage on the ballot and sold Genesee Towers to a development group for $1 to demolish the structure. The board certified the referendum petition on August 8, returning the previous Emergency Financial Manager Law into effect. With Brown previously temporary mayor for the last few years, he was ineligible to be the Emergency Financial Manager. Ed Kurtz was once again appointed Emergency Financial Manager by the Emergency Financial Assistance Loan Board.

Two lawsuits were filed in September 2012, one by the city council against Kurtz's appointment, while another was against the state in Ingham County Circuit Court claiming the old emergency financial manager law remains repealed. On November 30, State Treasurer Andy Dillon announced the financial emergency was still ongoing, and the emergency manager was still needed.

Michael Brown was re-appointed Emergency Manager on June 26, 2013, and returned to work on July 8. Flint had an $11.3 million projected deficit when Brown started as emergency manager in 2011. The city faced a $19.1 million combined deficit from 2012, with plans to borrow $12 million to cover part of it. Brown resigned from his position in early September 2013, and his last day was October 31. He was succeeded by Saginaw city manager (and former Flint temporary mayor) Darnell Earley.

Earley formed a blue ribbon committee on governance with 23 members on January 16, 2014, to review city operations and consider possible charter amendments. The blue ribbon committee recommend that the city move to a council-manager government. Six charter amendment proposals were placed on the November 4, 2014, ballot with the charter review commission proposal passing along with reduction of mayoral staff appointments and budgetary amendments. Proposals which would eliminate certain executive departments, the Civil Service Commission and the ombudsman office were defeated. Flint elected a nine-member Charter Review Commission on May 5, 2015.

With Earley appointed to be emergency manager for Detroit Public Schools on January 13, 2015, city financial adviser Jerry Ambrose was selected to finish out the financial emergency with an expected exit in April. On April 30, 2015, the state moved the city from under an emergency manager receivership to a Receivership Transition Advisory Board. On November 3, 2015, Flint residents elected Karen Weaver as their first female mayor. On January 22, 2016, the Receivership Transition Advisory Board unanimously voted to return some powers, including appointment authority, to the mayor. The Receivership Transit Authority Board was formally dissolved by State Treasurer Nick Khouri on April 10, 2018, returning the city to local control.

==== Water state of emergency ====
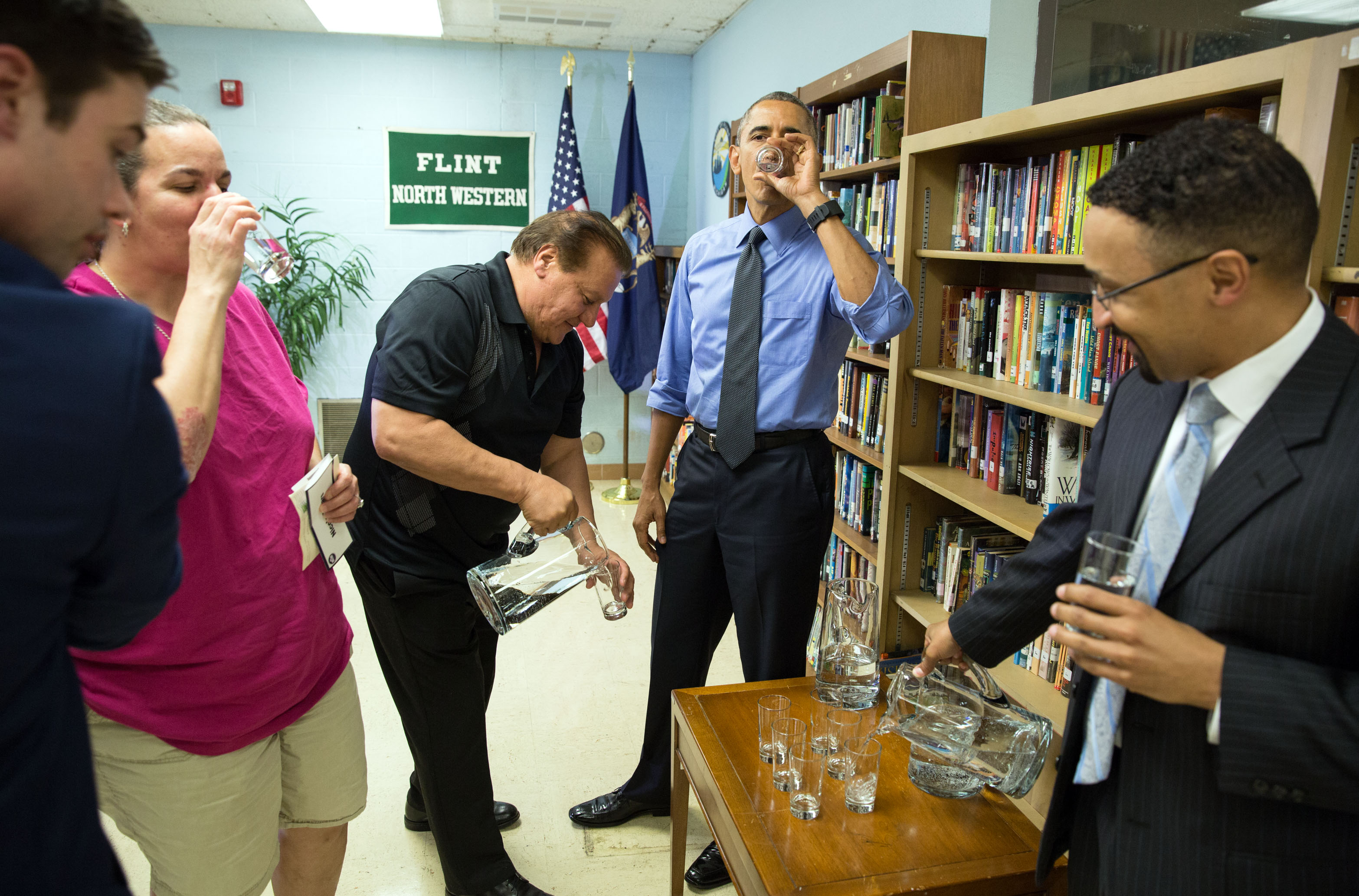
President Barack Obama sips filtered Flint water following a roundtable on the Flint water crisis, 2016

In April 2014, during a financial crisis, state-appointed emergency manager Darnell Earley changed Flint's water source from the Detroit Water and Sewerage Department (sourced from Lake Huron) to the Flint River. The problem was compounded with the fact that anticorrosive measures were not implemented. After two independent studies, lead poisoning caused by the water was found in the area's population. This has led to several lawsuits, the resignation of several officials, fifteen criminal indictments, and a federal public health state of emergency for all of Genesee County.

== Geography ==
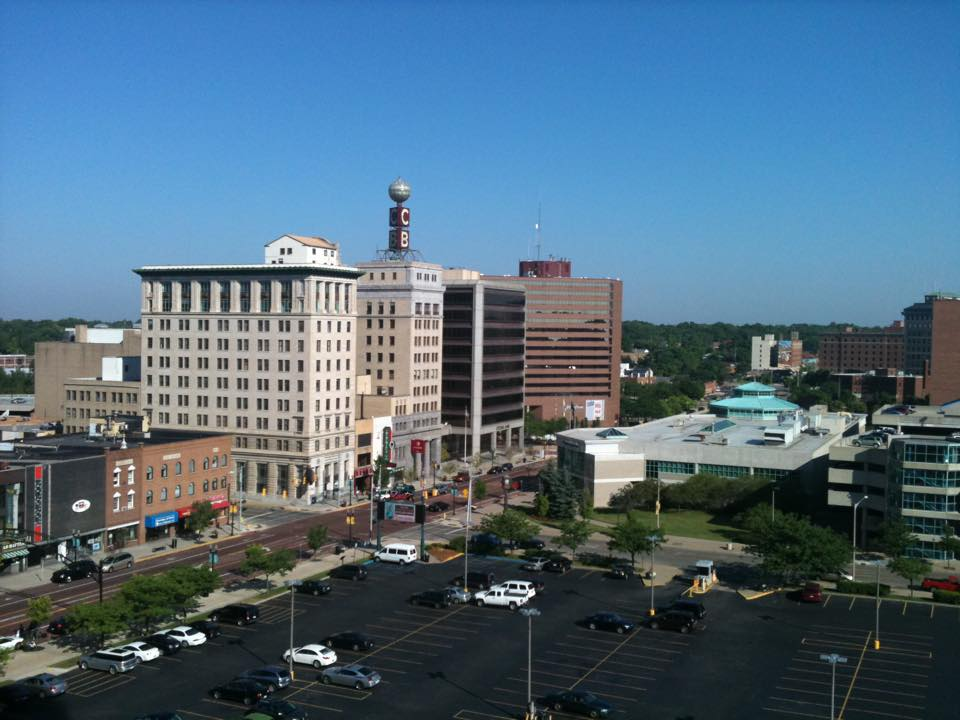
Downtown Flint looking northwest, taken from a now-demolished skyscraper, the Genesee Towers. The downtown core has seen some improvement in recent years due to an influx of younger people, college students, and new restaurants and bars.

Flint lies in the Flint/Tri-Cities region of Michigan. Flint and Genesee County can be categorized as a subregion of Flint/Tri-Cities. It is located along the Flint River, which flows through Lapeer, Genesee, and Saginaw counties and is 78.3 mi (126.0 km) long.

According to the United States Census Bureau, the city has a total area of 34.06 square miles (88.21 km^{2}), of which, 33.42 square miles (86.56 km^{2}) is land and 0.64 square miles (1.66 km^{2}) is water. Flint lies just to the northeast of the Flint hills. The terrain is low and rolling along the south and east sides, and flatter to the northwest.

=== Neighborhoods ===
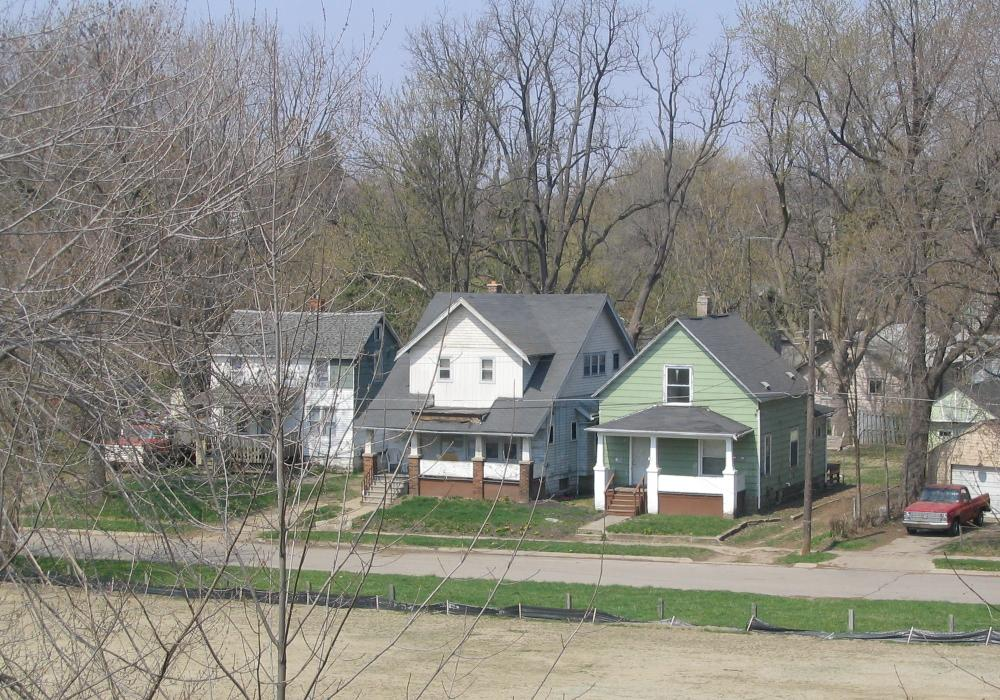
Hall's Flats on the West Side is one of Flint's many neighborhoods.

Flint has several neighborhoods grouped around the center of the city on the four cardinal sides. The downtown business district is centered on Saginaw Street south of the Flint River. Just west, on opposite sides of the river, are Carriage Town (north) and the Grand Traverse Street District (south). Both neighborhoods boast strong neighborhood associations. These neighborhoods were the center of manufacturing for and profits from the nation's carriage industry until the 1920s and are the site of many well-preserved Victorian homes and the setting of Atwood Stadium.

The University Avenue corridor of Carriage Town is home to the largest concentration of Greek housing in the area. Many fraternity houses from Kettering University and the University of Michigan-Flint are located there.

Just north of downtown is River Village, an example of gentrification via mixed-income public housing. To the east of I-475 is Central Park and Fairfield Village. These are the only two neighborhoods between UM-Flint and Mott Community College and enjoy strong neighborhood associations. Central Park piloted a project to convert street lights to LED and is defined by seven cul-de-sacs.

The North Side and 5th Ward are predominantly African American, with such historic districts as Buick City and Civic Park on the north, and Sugar Hill, Floral Park, and Kent and Elm Parks on the south. Many of these neighborhoods were the original centers of early Michigan blues. The South Side in particular was also a center for multi-racial migration from Missouri, Kentucky, Tennessee, and the Deep South since World War II. These neighborhoods are most often lower income but have maintained some level of economic stratification. The East Side is the site of the Applewood Mott Estate, and Mott Community College, the Cultural Center, and East Village, one of Flint's more prosperous areas. The surrounding neighborhood is called the college/Cultural Neighborhood, with a strong neighborhood association, lower crime rate and stable housing prices.

Just north is Eastside Proper, also known as the State Streets, and has much of Flint's Hispanic community. The West Side includes the main site of the 1936–37 sit-down strike, the Mott Park neighborhood, Kettering University, and the historic Woodcroft Estates, owned in the past by legendary automotive executives and current home to prominent and historic Flint families such as the Motts, the Manleys, and the Smiths.

Facilities associated with General Motors in the past and present are scattered throughout the city, including GM Truck and Bus, Flint Metal Center and Powertrain South (clustered together on the city's southwestern corner); Powertrain North, Flint Tool and Die and Delphi East. The largest plant, Buick City, and adjacent facilities have been demolished.

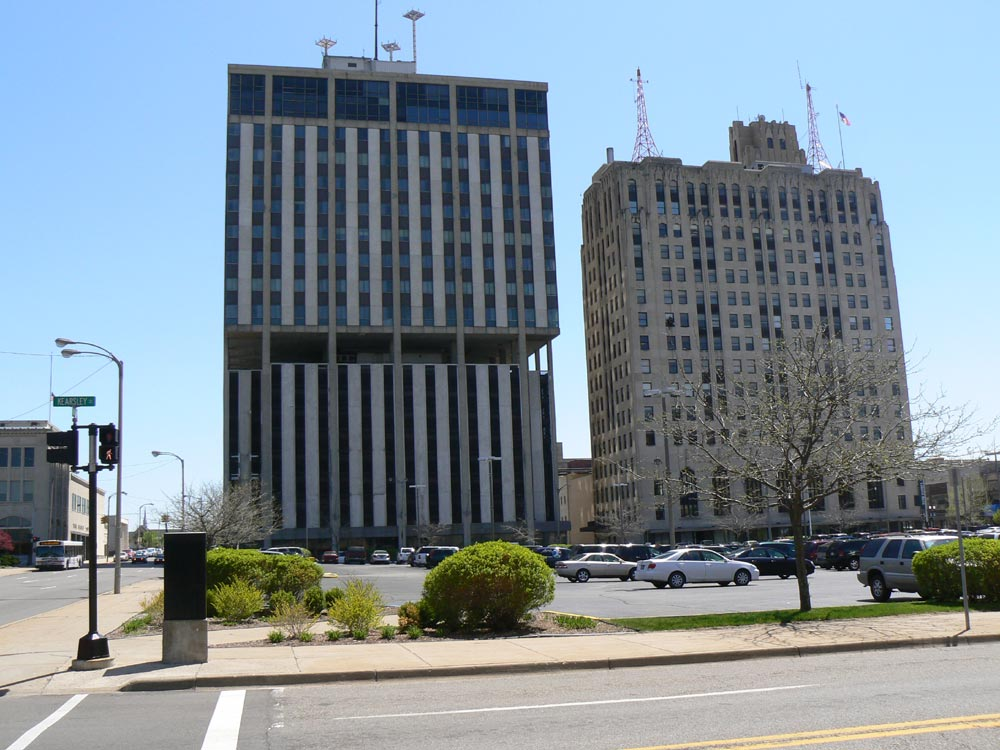
The Genesee Towers (left), now demolished, and Mott Foundation Building (right). The Flint Journal's former headquarters (now used by the Michigan State University College of Human Medicine) is to the far left.

Half of Flint's fourteen tallest buildings were built during the 1920s. The 19-story Genesee Towers, formerly the city's tallest building, was completed in 1968. The building became unused in later years and fell into severe disrepair: a cautionary sign warning of falling debris was put on the sidewalk in front of it. An investment company purchased the building for $1, and it was demolished (by implosion) on December 22, 2013.

=== Climate ===
Climate chart for Flint

Typical of southeastern Michigan, Flint has a humid continental climate (Köppen Dfb), and is part of USDA Hardiness zone 6a. Winters are cold, with moderate snowfall and temperatures not rising above freezing on an average 52 days annually, while dropping to 0 °F (−18 °C) or below on an average 9.3 days a year; summers are warm to hot with temperatures exceeding 90 °F (32 °C) on 9.0 days. The monthly daily mean temperature ranges from 23.0 °F (−5.0 °C) in January to 70.9 °F (21.6 °C) in July. Official temperature extremes range from 108 °F (42 °C) on July 8 and 13, 1936 down to −25 °F (−32 °C) on January 18, 1976, and February 20, 2015; the record low maximum is −4 °F (−20 °C) on January 18, 1994, while, conversely the record high minimum is 79 °F (26 °C) on July 18, 1942. Decades may pass between readings of 100 °F (38 °C) or higher, which last occurred July 17, 2012. The average window for freezing temperatures is October 8 thru May 7, allowing a growing season of 153 days. On June 8, 1953, Flint was hit by an F5 tornado, which claimed 116 lives.

Precipitation is moderate and somewhat evenly-distributed throughout the year, although the warmer months average more, averaging 31.97 inches (812 mm) annually, but historically ranging from 18.08 in (459 mm) in 1963 to 45.38 in (1,153 mm) in 1975. Snowfall, which typically falls in measurable amounts between November 12 through April 9 (occasionally in October and very rarely in May), averages 52.1 inches (132 cm) per year, although historically ranging from 16.0 in (41 cm) in 1944–45 to 85.3 in (217 cm) in 2017–18. A snow depth of 1 in (2.5 cm) or more occurs on an average 64 days, with 53 days from December to February.

Climate data for Flint, Michigan (Bishop Int'l), 1991–2020 normals, extremes 1921–present
Month	Jan	Feb	Mar	Apr	May	Jun	Jul	Aug	Sep	Oct	Nov	Dec	Year
Record high °F (°C)	65 (18)	73 (23)	86 (30)	88 (31)	93 (34)	104 (40)	108 (42)	103 (39)	100 (38)	89 (32)	79 (26)	70 (21)	108 (42)
Mean maximum °F (°C)	52.1 (11.2)	53.0 (11.7)	68.1 (20.1)	78.4 (25.8)	86.2 (30.1)	91.9 (33.3)	92.7 (33.7)	91.5 (33.1)	88.4 (31.3)	79.3 (26.3)	66.0 (18.9)	55.1 (12.8)	94.8 (34.9)
Mean daily maximum °F (°C)	29.9 (−1.2)	32.8 (0.4)	43.3 (6.3)	56.7 (13.7)	68.9 (20.5)	78.2 (25.7)	82.1 (27.8)	79.9 (26.6)	73.1 (22.8)	60.1 (15.6)	46.6 (8.1)	34.9 (1.6)	57.2 (14.0)
Daily mean °F (°C)	23.0 (−5.0)	24.7 (−4.1)	34.2 (1.2)	46.0 (7.8)	57.4 (14.1)	67.1 (19.5)	70.9 (21.6)	69.1 (20.6)	61.7 (16.5)	50.2 (10.1)	38.8 (3.8)	28.7 (−1.8)	47.6 (8.7)
Mean daily minimum °F (°C)	16.0 (−8.9)	16.7 (−8.5)	25.1 (−3.8)	35.3 (1.8)	46.0 (7.8)	55.9 (13.3)	59.7 (15.4)	58.3 (14.6)	50.4 (10.2)	40.3 (4.6)	31.0 (−0.6)	22.5 (−5.3)	38.1 (3.4)
Mean minimum °F (°C)	−6.1 (−21.2)	−4.4 (−20.2)	5.4 (−14.8)	21.4 (−5.9)	31.8 (−0.1)	41.4 (5.2)	47.2 (8.4)	46.1 (7.8)	35.0 (1.7)	25.9 (−3.4)	15.4 (−9.2)	3.5 (−15.8)	−10.2 (−23.4)
Record low °F (°C)	−25 (−32)	−25 (−32)	−16 (−27)	6 (−14)	22 (−6)	33 (1)	40 (4)	37 (3)	26 (−3)	19 (−7)	−7 (−22)	−18 (−28)	−25 (−32)
Average precipitation inches (mm)	1.99 (51)	1.68 (43)	1.97 (50)	3.13 (80)	3.68 (93)	3.12 (79)	3.41 (87)	3.16 (80)	2.90 (74)	2.77 (70)	2.27 (58)	1.89 (48)	31.97 (812)
Average snowfall inches (cm)	15.1 (38)	13.0 (33)	6.6 (17)	2.4 (6.1)	0.0 (0.0)	0.0 (0.0)	0.0 (0.0)	0.0 (0.0)	0.0 (0.0)	0.3 (0.76)	3.3 (8.4)	11.4 (29)	52.1 (132)
Average precipitation days (≥ 0.01 in)	14.2	10.9	11.0	12.7	12.1	10.8	9.5	10.0	9.6	11.8	11.6	13.8	138.0
Average snowy days (≥ 0.1 in)	13.3	10.7	6.2	2.4	0.0	0.0	0.0	0.0	0.0	0.3	3.6	10.3	46.8
Average relative humidity (%)	75.3	73.1	70.3	65.8	65.5	68.4	69.6	73.3	75.6	73.2	75.6	77.4	71.9
Average dew point °F (°C)	15.3 (−9.3)	16.2 (−8.8)	24.4 (−4.2)	34.0 (1.1)	44.6 (7.0)	54.7 (12.6)	59.4 (15.2)	58.8 (14.9)	52.5 (11.4)	41.0 (5.0)	31.8 (−0.1)	21.4 (−5.9)	37.8 (3.2)
Source: NOAA (relative humidity and dew point 1961–1990)

== Demographics ==
Historical population
Census	Pop.	Note	%±
1850	1,670		—
1860	2,950		76.6%
1870	5,386		82.6%
1880	8,409		56.1%
1890	9,803		16.6%
1900	13,103		33.7%
1910	38,550		194.2%
1920	91,599		137.6%
1930	156,492		70.8%
1940	151,543		−3.2%
1950	163,143		7.7%
1960	196,940		20.7%
1970	193,317		−1.8%
1980	159,611		−17.4%
1990	140,761		−11.8%
2000	124,943		−11.2%
2010	102,434		−18.0%
2020	81,252		−20.7%
2024 (est.)	79,735		−1.9%
U.S. Decennial Census; 2020 Census

=== Racial and ethnic composition ===
Flint, Michigan – racial and ethnic composition Note: the US Census treats Hispanic/Latino as an ethnic category. This table excludes Latinos from the racial categories and assigns them to a separate category. Hispanics/Latinos may be of any race.
Race / ethnicity (NH = non-Hispanic)	Pop. 1990	Pop. 2000	Pop. 2010	Pop. 2020	% 1990	% 2000	% 2010	% 2020
White alone (NH)	67,971	50,020	36,537	26,372	48.29%	40.03%	35.67%	32.46%
Black or African American alone (NH)	67,027	66,231	57,451	45,293	47.62%	53.01%	56.09%	55.74%
Native American or Alaska Native alone (NH)	937	703	455	302	0.67%	0.56%	0.44%	0.37%
Asian alone (NH)	656	536	450	404	0.47%	0.43%	0.44%	0.50%
Native Hawaiian or Pacific Islander alone (NH)	—	14	14	25	—	0.01%	0.01%	0.03%
Other race alone (NH)	156	252	140	424	0.11%	0.20%	0.14%	0.52%
Mixed race or multiracial (NH)	—	3,445	3,411	4,476	—	2.76%	3.33%	5.51%
Hispanic or Latino (any race)	4,014	3,742	3,976	3,956	2.85%	2.99%	3.88%	4.87%
Total	140,761	124,943	102,434	81,252	100.00%	100.00%	100.00%	100.00%

=== 2020 census ===
As of the 2020 census, Flint had a population of 81,252, with 33,559 households and 18,640 families. The median age was 36.4 years; 25.3% of residents were under the age of 18 and 13.8% were 65 years of age or older. For every 100 females there were 96.5 males, and for every 100 females age 18 and over there were 92.5 males age 18 and over.

The population density was 2,429.78 inhabitants per square mile (938.1/km^{2}). There were 40,578 housing units at an average density of 1,213.46 per square mile (468.5/km^{2}); 17.3% were vacant. The homeowner vacancy rate was 2.0% and the rental vacancy rate was 12.9%.

100.0% of residents lived in urban areas, while 0.0% lived in rural areas.

Racial composition as of the 2020 census
Race	Number	Percent
White	27,538	33.9%
Black or African American	45,711	56.3%
American Indian and Alaska Native	398	0.5%
Asian	410	0.5%
Native Hawaiian and Other Pacific Islander	27	0.0%
Some other race	1,585	2.0%
Two or more races	5,583	6.9%

=== 2010 census ===
As of the 2010 census, there were 102,434 people, 40,472 households, and 23,949 families residing in the city. The population density was 3,065.05 inhabitants per square mile (1,183.4/km^{2}). There were 51,321 housing units at an average density of 1,535.64 per square mile (592.9/km^{2}). The racial makeup of the city was 37.42% White, 56.56% African American, 0.54% Native American, 0.45% Asian, 0.02% Pacific Islander, 1.14% from some other races and 3.87% from two or more races. Hispanic or Latino people of any race were 3.88% of the population.

There were 40,472 households, of which 34.3% had children under the age of 18 living with them, 23.1% were married couples living together, 29.0% had a female householder with no husband present, 7.1% had a male householder with no wife present, and 40.8% were non-families. 33.9% of all households were made up of individuals, and 9.8% had someone living alone who was 65 years of age or older. The average household size was 2.45 and the average family size was 3.13.

The median age in the city was 33.6 years. 27.3% of residents were under the age of 18; 11.3% were between the ages of 18 and 24; 25.5% were from 25 to 44; 25.1% were from 45 to 64; and 10.7% were 65 years of age or older. The gender makeup of the city was 48.0% male and 52.0% female.

=== 2023 American Community Survey ===
As of the 2023 American Community Survey, there are 33,670 estimated households in Flint with an average of 2.33 persons per household. The city has a median household income of $36,194. Approximately 34.4% of the city's population lives at or below the poverty line. Flint has an estimated 54.8% employment rate, with 13.1% of the population holding a bachelor's degree or higher and 83.3% holding a high school diploma.

=== Immigration and ethnicity estimates ===
In 2016, Niraj Warikoo of the Detroit Free Press stated that area community leaders believed that the Hispanic and Latino people made up close to 6% of the city population, while the city also had 142 Arab-American families. According to the most recent data from the U.S. Census Bureau, slightly over 1% of Flint's population was born outside the U.S., and over three-quarters of that foreign-born population have become naturalized citizens.

== Sports ==
Club	Sport	League	Venue
Flint City Bucks	Soccer	USL League 2	Atwood Stadium
Flint Rogues Rugby Club	Rugby	Michigan Rugby Football Union	Longway Park
Flint Fury	Football	Midwest Elite Football Alliance	Flint Hamady High School
Flint United	Men's Basketball	The Basketball League	Dort Financial Center
Flint Monarchs	Women's basketball	Women's American Basketball	Dort Financial Center
Flint Firebirds	Hockey	Ontario Hockey League	Dort Financial Center
Flint City Handball Club	Club Team Handball	TBD	Berston Fieldhouse

=== American football ===
There is semi-pro football at Atwood Stadium with the Flint Fury. Atwood is an 11,000+ seat stadium in downtown Flint which has hosted many events, including baseball. When artificial turf was installed, it was no longer able to host baseball games. The Flint Fury have been in action since 2003, and are currently a part of the Great Lakes Football League. The team was founded by two of its players; Charles Lawler and Prince Goodson, who both played for the defunct Flint Falcons semi-pro team. The team is now solely owned by Lawler.

The 2009 Heisman Trophy winner Mark Ingram II, born and raised in Grand Blanc, attended his final year of high school at Flint Southwestern Academy. He won the Heisman with 1304 total votes. Ingram attended the University of Alabama and is their first Heisman winner. He was a member of the National Champion 2009 Alabama Crimson Tide football team.

=== Basketball ===
Many Flint natives have played basketball in the National Basketball Association (NBA), NCAA Division I or European professional basketball. NBA champion Glen Rice, Eddie Robinson and three-time NBA champion JaVale McGee, and Milwaukee Bucks forward Kyle Kuzma all hail from Flint, as do Morris Peterson, Mateen Cleaves, and Charlie Bell (four of the five starters from Michigan State University's "Flintstones" 2000 National Championship team).

Local teacher and independent film maker Marcus Davenport chronicles Flint's ties to basketball and the basketball culture in his documentary Flint Star: The Motion Picture. Will Ferrell's 2008 movie Semi-Pro is based on the fictional basketball team the "Flint Tropics".

=== Ice hockey ===
On January 14, 2015, the Ontario Hockey League's Plymouth Whalers were relocated to Flint after a sale of the team to the owner of Perani Arena for the 2015–16 season. The team changed its name to the Flint Firebirds. In September 2022, the Firebirds announced the Leamington Flyers as an affiliate.

=== Other sports ===
Flint is twinned with Hamilton, Ontario, and its amateur athletes compete in the CANUSA Games, held alternatively between the two cities since 1957.

=== Former sports teams ===
Club	Sport	League	Venue
Flint Flames (2000)	Arena football	Indoor Football League	IMA Sports Arena
Michigan Pirates (2007)	Arena football	Continental Indoor Football League	Perani Arena and Event Center
Flint Phantoms (2008)	Arena football	Continental Indoor Football League	Perani Arena and Event Center
Flint Flyers (1889–1891)	Baseball	Michigan State League	Venue Unknown
Flint Vehicles (1906–1915, 1921–1925)	Baseball	Michigan-Ontario League	Athletic Park
Flint Halligans (1919–1920)	Baseball	Michigan-Ontario League	Athletic Park
Flint Gems (1940)	Baseball	Michigan State League	Atwood Stadium
Flint Indians (1941)	Baseball	Michigan State League	Atwood Stadium
Flint Arrows (1948–1951)	Baseball	Central League	Atwood Stadium
Flint Pros (1972–1974)	Basketball	Continental Basketball Association	IMA Auditorium
Flint Fuze (2001)	Basketball	Continental Basketball Association	IMA Sports Arena
UM-Flint Kodiaks	College football	National Club Football Association	Atwood Stadium
Flint Wildcats (1974–1977)	Football	Midwest Football League	Atwood Stadium
Flint Sabres (1974–1988)	Football	Midwest Football League	Atwood Stadium
Flint Falcons (1992–2001)	Football	Michigan Football League, Ohio Valley Football League	Atwood Stadium, Holy Redeemer Field
Michigan Admirals (2002–2009)	Football	North American Football League, United States Football Alliance	Hamady Field, Russ Reynolds Field, Atwood Stadium
Genesee County Patriots (2003–2009)	Football	Ohio Valley Football League, North American Football League	Atwood Stadium, Guy V. Houston Stadium
Flint Blue Devils	Football	League unknown	Atwood Stadium
Flint Yellow Jackets	Football	League unknown	Atwood Stadium
Flint Rampage	Football	Great Lakes Football League	Atwood Stadium
Flint Generals (1969–1985)	Hockey	International Hockey League	IMA Center
Flint Spirits (1985–1990)	Hockey	International Hockey League	IMA Sports Arena
Flint Bulldogs (1991–1993)	Hockey	Colonial Hockey League	IMA Sports Arena
Flint Generals (1993–2010)	Hockey	Colonial/United/International Hockey League (1993–2010)	Perani Arena and Event Center
Michigan Warriors (2010–2015)	Hockey	North American Hockey League	Perani Arena, Iceland Arena
Flint City Riveters	Women's football	Women's Football Alliance	Guy V. Houston Stadium
Michigan Phoenix	Women's soccer	Women's Premier Soccer League	Guy V. Houston Stadium
Waza Flo	Indoor soccer	Major Arena Soccer League	Dort Federal Credit Union Event Center

== Government ==
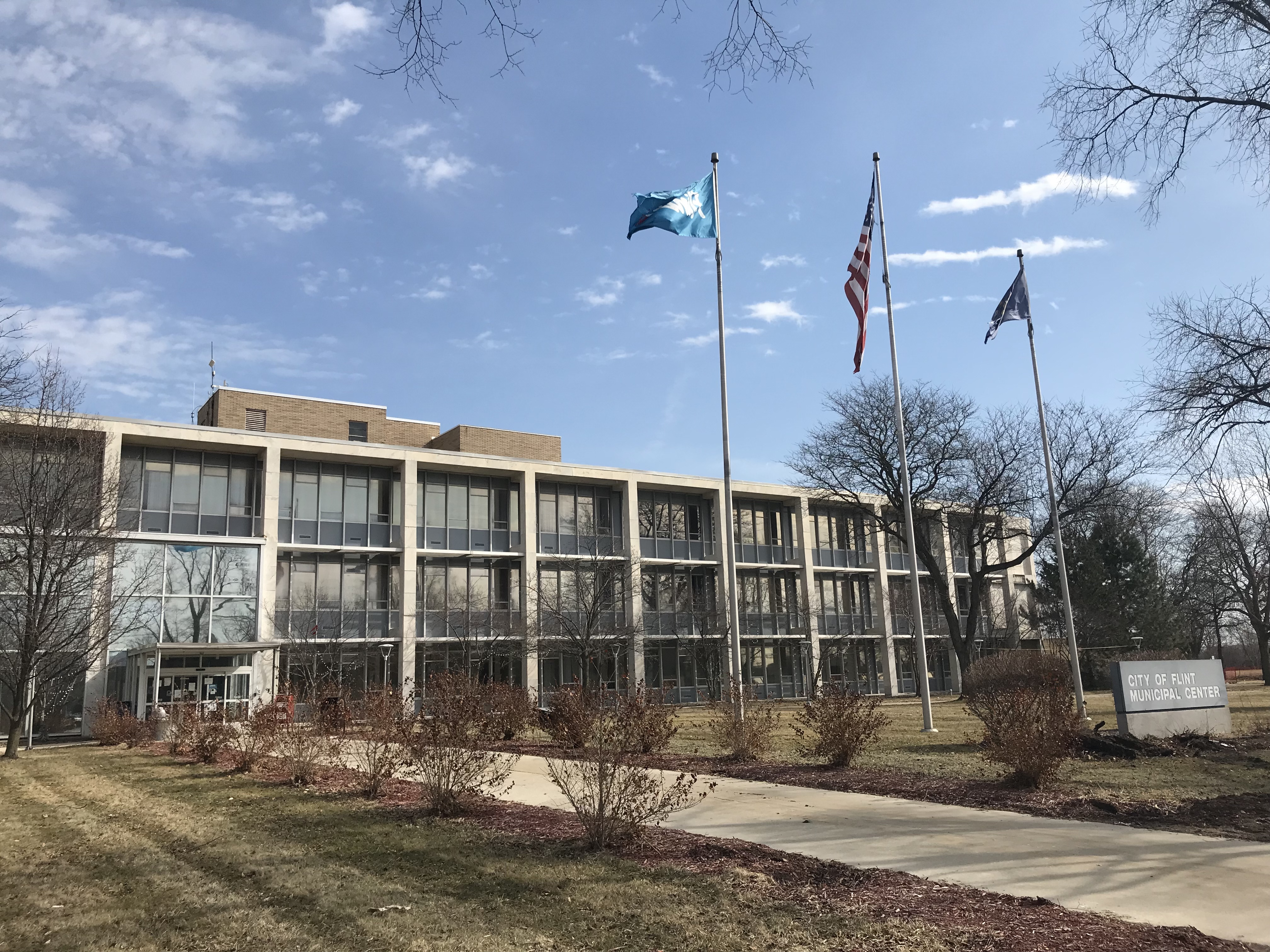
Flint Municipal Center

The city levies an income tax of 1 percent on residents and 0.5 percent on nonresidents. The 1974 Charter is the city's current charter that gives the city a strong mayor form of government. It also instituted the appointed independent office of Ombudsman, while the city clerk is solely appointed by the city council. The city council is composed of members elected from the city's nine wards. A Charter Review Commission is currently impaneled to review the charter for a complete overhaul. The city operated under state-led financial receivership from April 30, 2015, to April 10, 2018, which saw the city under an Emergency Manager as the State of Michigan had declared a state of local government financial emergency. The Receivership Transition Advisory Board had the authority to override council decisions related to financial matters. The city has operated under at least four charters (1855, 1888, 1929, 1974).

=== Law enforcement ===
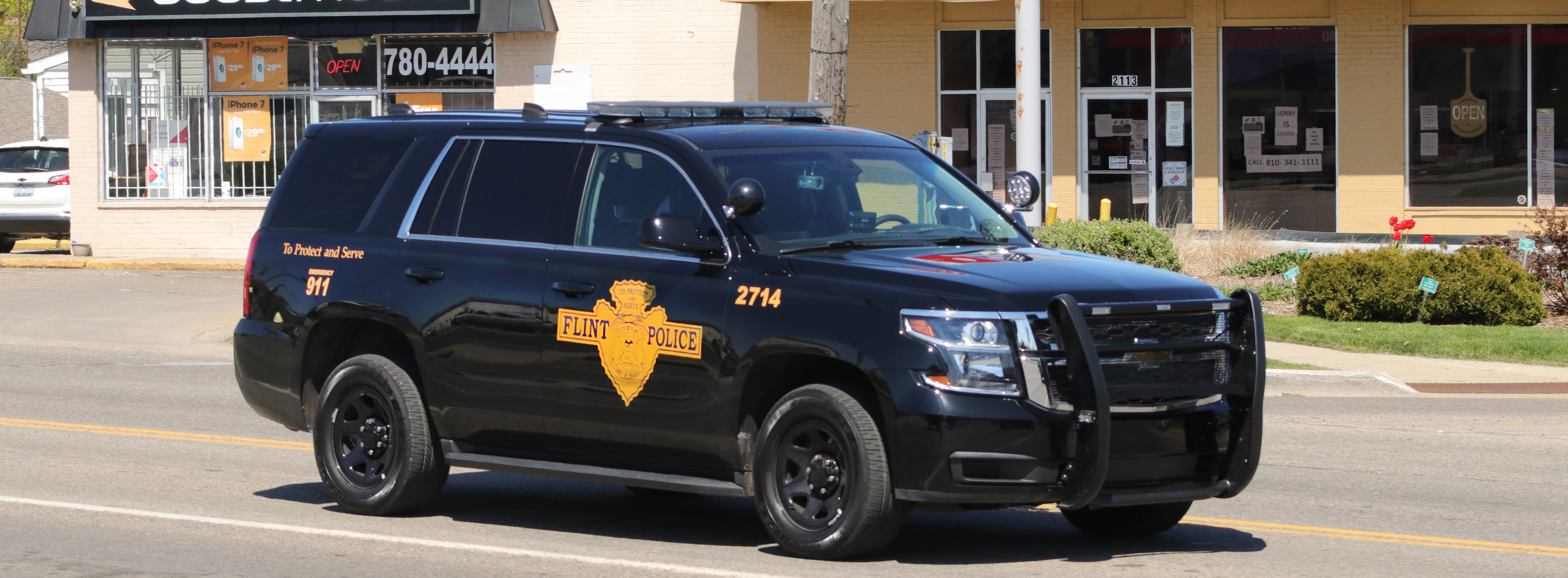
A Flint police vehicle

Flint
- Crime rates* (2023)

Violent crimes
- Homicide: 155
- Rape: 428
- Robbery: 346
- Aggravated assault: 4,896
- Total violent crime: 5,825

Property crimes
- Burglary: 1,796
- Larceny-theft: 4,557
- Motor vehicle theft: 1,044
- Arson: 111
- Total property crime: 7,508
- Note: Reported crimes per 100,000 population Source: 2023 FBI CDE UCR Data

Law enforcement in Flint is the responsibility of the Flint Police Department, the Genesee County Sheriff's Office, and the Michigan State Police. Flint has been consistently ranked as one of the most dangerous cities in the United States by multiple sources. From 2007 to 2009, violent crime in Flint was ranked in the top five among U.S. cities with a population of at least 50,000 people. From 2010 to 2012, Flint ranked as the city with the highest violent crime rate among cities with over 100,000 population. In 2015, CQ Press (using FBI statistics) ranked the crime index for Flint as seventh-highest in cities with population greater than 75,000. In 2018, the FBI reported Flint was ranked as America's sixth most violent city among those with population of 50,000 or more in 2017. Violent crimes were up 23% compared to 2016 according to the report.

=== Politics ===
Most politicians are affiliated with the Democratic party despite the city's elections being nonpartisan. In 2006, Flint was the tenth most liberal city in the United States, according to a nationwide study by the non-partisan Bay Area Center for Voting Research, which examined the voting patterns of 237 cities with a population over 100,000.

The city elected Karen Weaver as its first female mayor in 2015. She was succeeded in 2020 by Sheldon Neeley.

== Education ==
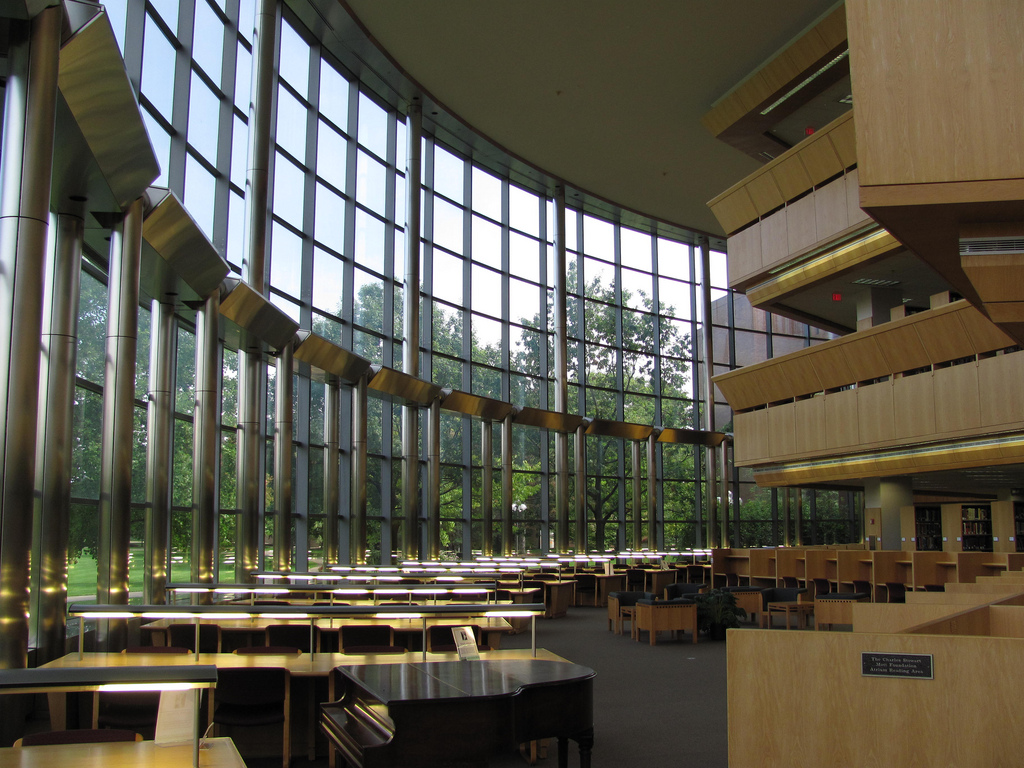
Frances Willson Thompson Library at the University of Michigan–Flint

=== Colleges and universities ===
- University of Michigan–Flint
- Kettering University
- Mott Community College
- Michigan State University College of Human Medicine

=== Primary and secondary schools ===
Public K-12 education is provided under the umbrella of the Flint Community Schools. Students attend ten elementary schools, one middle school, and one high school (Flint Southwestern Academy). The city's original high school, Flint Central High School, was closed in 2009 because of a budget deficit and a lack of maintenance on the building by the Flint School District. The building, however, still stands. Flint Northern High School was converted to an alternative education school at the start of the 2013–14 school year and was closed later in 2014. The state-run Michigan School for the Deaf is located in Flint, and Michigan School for the Blind was previously there, having moved from Lansing in 1995.

The Catholic high school is Fr. Luke M. Powers Catholic High School which is part of the Roman Catholic Diocese of Lansing and serves the entire county. The school moved from its location just north of Flint in Mt. Morris Township in 2013 into the former Michigan School for the Deaf building off of Miller Road in Flint, which received a $22 million renovation. The Valley School is a small private K–12 school. Flint also has several charter schools, including International Academy of Flint, Flint Cultural Center Academy and Eagle's Nest Academy.

=== Libraries ===
The Flint Public Library holds 454,645 books, 22,355 audio materials, 9,453 video materials, and 2,496 serial subscriptions.

== Media ==
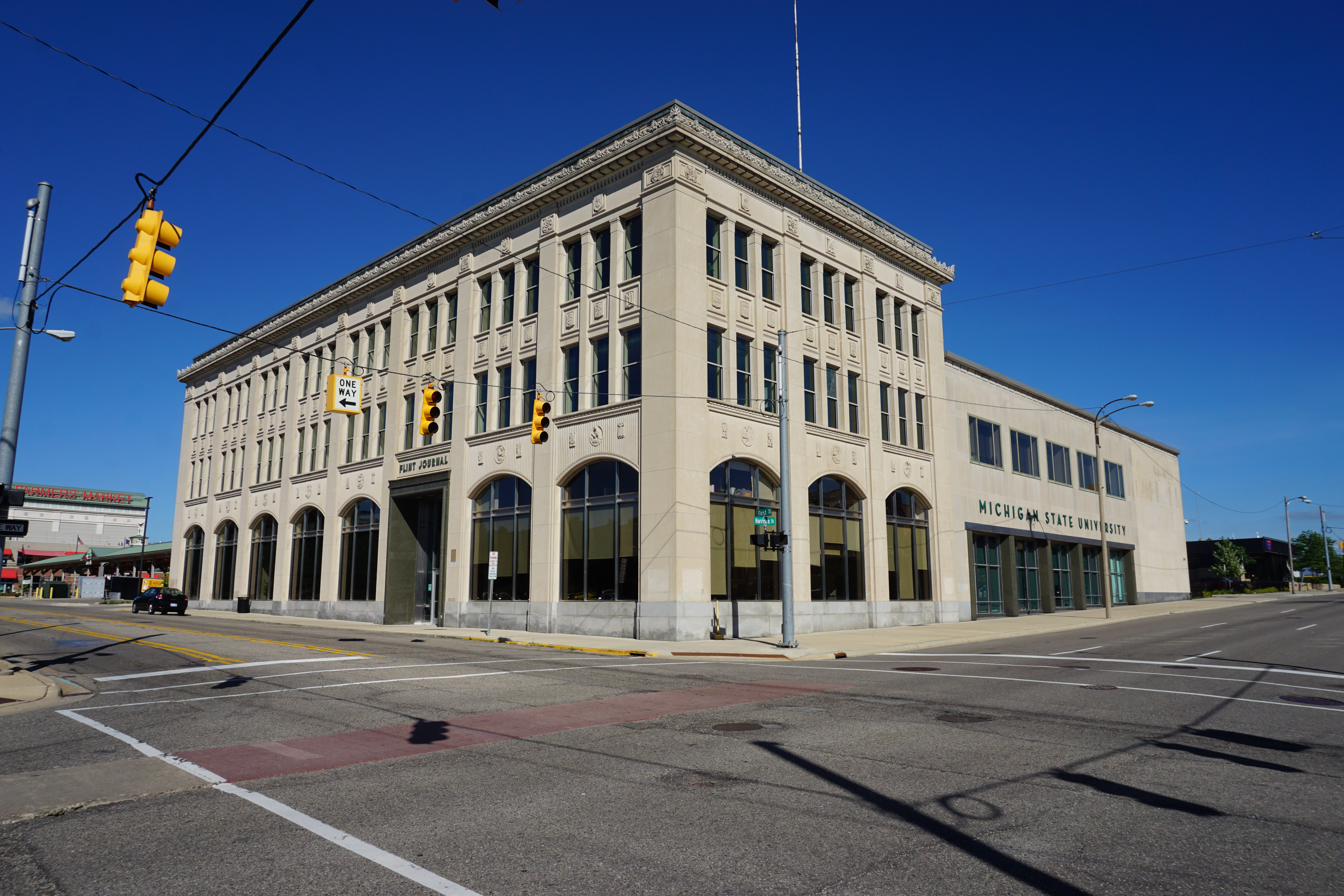
The former Flint Journal Building, now used by the Michigan State University College of Human Medicine

=== Print ===
The county's largest newspaper is The Flint Journal, which dates back to 1876. Effective June 2009 the paper ceased to be a daily publication, opting to publish on Thursdays, Fridays and Sundays. The move made Genesee County the largest county in the United States without a daily newspaper. The Flint Journal began publishing a Tuesday edition in March 2010. The East Village Magazine is a non-profit news magazine providing information about neighborhood issues since 1976. The monthly magazine centers on the East Village neighborhood, outside downtown Flint, but is distributed throughout the city. The Uncommon Sense was a monthly publication featuring investigative journalism, political analysis, satirical cartoons, and articles about Flint music, art, nightlife and culture; it stopped publishing in 2007. In January 2009, Uncommon Sense editors and contributors began publishing Broadside, available exclusively in print. Its last issue was published in April 2014. In early 2009 Flint Comix & Entertainment began circulating around college campuses, and local businesses. This monthly publication features local and nationally recognized comic artists, as well as editorials, and other news.

Two quarterly magazines have appeared in recent years: Innovative Health Magazine and Downtown Flint Revival Magazine. Debuting in 2008, Innovative Health highlights the medical advancements, health services and lifestyles happening in and around Genesee County, while Downtown Flint Revival reports on new developments, building renovations and the many businesses in the Downtown area. A new monthly magazine which began publishing in June 2013 is known as My City Magazine which highlights events, arts and culture in Genesee County. Online news source FlintBeat.com was launched in 2017 by Flint-area native, Jiquanda Johnson. The hyper local news website focuses on Flint City Hall, solutions journalism and public health in addition to their work covering neighborhoods and telling community stories. University publications include University of Michigan–Flint's student newspaper The Michigan Times, Kettering University's The Technician and the MCC Chronicle, formerly the MCC Post, which is a monthly magazine from Mott Community College.

=== Television ===
WJRT-TV (ABC), formerly one of ten ABC owned-and-operated stations, is currently the only area station to operate from Flint. WSMH (Fox, with NBC on DT2) is licensed to Flint, but its programming originates from outside of Flint proper (the suburb Mt. Morris Township), WEYI (Roar), licensed to Saginaw, and WBSF (The CW), licensed to Bay City, share studios with WSMH. Other stations outside the Flint area that serve the area include Saginaw-based WNEM-TV (CBS, with MyNetworkTV on DT2) (which has a news bureau in Downtown Flint), Delta College's WDCQ-TV (PBS), and Saginaw's WAQP (TCT).

==== TV stations ====
Call sign	Virtual channel	Physical channel	City of license	Network	Branding	Owner
WNEM-TV	5	30	Bay City	CBS; MNTV (DT2)	WNEM-TV5; WNEM-TV5 Plus (DT2)	Gray Television
WJRT-TV	12	12	Flint	ABC	ABC12	Allen Media Broadcasting
WCMU-TV	14	26	Mount Pleasant	PBS	CMU Public Media	Central Michigan University
WDCQ-TV	19	15	Bad Axe	PBS	Delta College Public Media - PBS	Delta College
WEYI-TV	25	18	Saginaw	Roar	Roar	Howard Stirk Holdings
WBSF	46	23	Bay City	The CW	CW 46	Cunningham Broadcasting
WAQP	49	36	Saginaw	TCT	TCT	Tri-State Christian Television
WSMH	66	16	Flint	Fox; NBC (DT2)	Fox 66; NBC 25 (DT2)	Sinclair Broadcast Group

=== Radio ===
The Flint radio market has a rich history. WAMM-AM 1420 (started in 1955, now gospel station WFLT) on the city's eastside was one of the first stations in the country to program to the black community and was also where legendary DJ Casey Kasem had his first radio job. WTAC-AM 600 (now religious station WSNL) was a highly rated and influential Top 40 station in the 1960s and 1970s, showcasing Michigan artists and being the first in the U.S. to play acts like The Who and AC/DC. WTAC changed its format to country music in 1980 and then became a pioneering contemporary Christian music station a few years later; the calls are now on 89.7 FM, a member of the "Smile FM" network. WTRX-AM 1330 also played Top 40 music for a time in the 1960s and '70s. The city's first radio station, AM 910 WFDF, first went on the air in 1922. It has since relocated south into the Detroit market, changing its city of license to Farmington Hills and increasing its power to 50,000 watts.

==== AM stations ====
Frequency (kHz)	Callsign	City of license	Format	Branding	Owner
600	WSNL	Flint	Christian talk	Christian Talk AM 600 and 106.5 FM	Christian Broadcasting System
1160	WCXI	Fenton	Christian talk	WCXI	Birach Broadcasting
1330	WTRX	Flint	Sports	Sports Xtra 1330	Cumulus Media
1420	WFLT	Flint	Urban Gospel	WFLT 1420	Flint Evangelical Broadcasting Association
1570	WWCK	Flint	Classic hits	K 107.3	Cumulus Media

==== FM stations ====
Frequency (MHz)	Callsign	City of license	Format	Branding	Owner
88.9	WLFN	Flint	Contemporary Christian	K-Love	Educational Media Foundation
89.7	WTAC	Burton/Flint	Christian	Smile FM	Superior Communications
91.1	WFUM	Flint	Public (News/Talk)	Michigan Public	University of Michigan
92.1	WFOV-LP	Flint	Variety (Adult Hits/Talk/Public affairs)	Our Voices Radio	Flint Odyssey House
92.7	WDZZ	Flint	Urban Adult Contemporary	Z 92.7	Cumulus Media
93.7	WRCL	Frankenmuth	Rhythmic Contemporary Hits	Club 93.7	Townsquare Media
94.3	WKUF-LP	Flint	College/Variety	WKUF 94.3	Kettering University
95.1	WFBE	Flint	Country	B95	Cumulus Media
97.3	W247CG (simulcast of WTAC)	Russellville	Christian	Smile FM	Superior Communications
98.9	WNFH	Vassar	Christian Music	Hope FM	
100.1	W261BH (simulcast of WLFN)	Flint	Contemporary Christian	K-Love	Educational Media Foundation
101.5	WWBN	Tuscola/Flint	Mainstream Rock	Banana 101.5	Townsquare Media
102.1	WFAH-LP	Flint	Variety	WFAH 102.1 FM	Greater Flint Arts Council
103.1	WQUS	Lapeer/Flint	Sports Radio	103.1 The Ticket	Townsquare Media
103.9	WRSR	Owosso/Flint	Sports Radio	103.9 The Fox	Krol Communications
104.7	WMRP-LP	Mundy Township	Oldies	Retro 104.7	SWC Concerts, Inc
105.5	WWCK-FM	Flint	Mainstream Contemporary Hits	CK 105.5	Cumulus Media
106.3	W292DA (simulcast of WLFN)	Linden	Contemporary Christian	K-Love	Educational Media Foundation
106.5	W293CA (simulcast of WSNL)	Flint	Christian	Christian Talk AM 600 and 106.5 FM	Christian Broadcasting System
107.3	W297CG (simulcast of WWCK)	Flint	Classic hits	K 107.3	Cumulus Media
107.9	WCRZ	Flint	Adult Contemporary	Cars 108	Townsquare Media

== Infrastructure ==
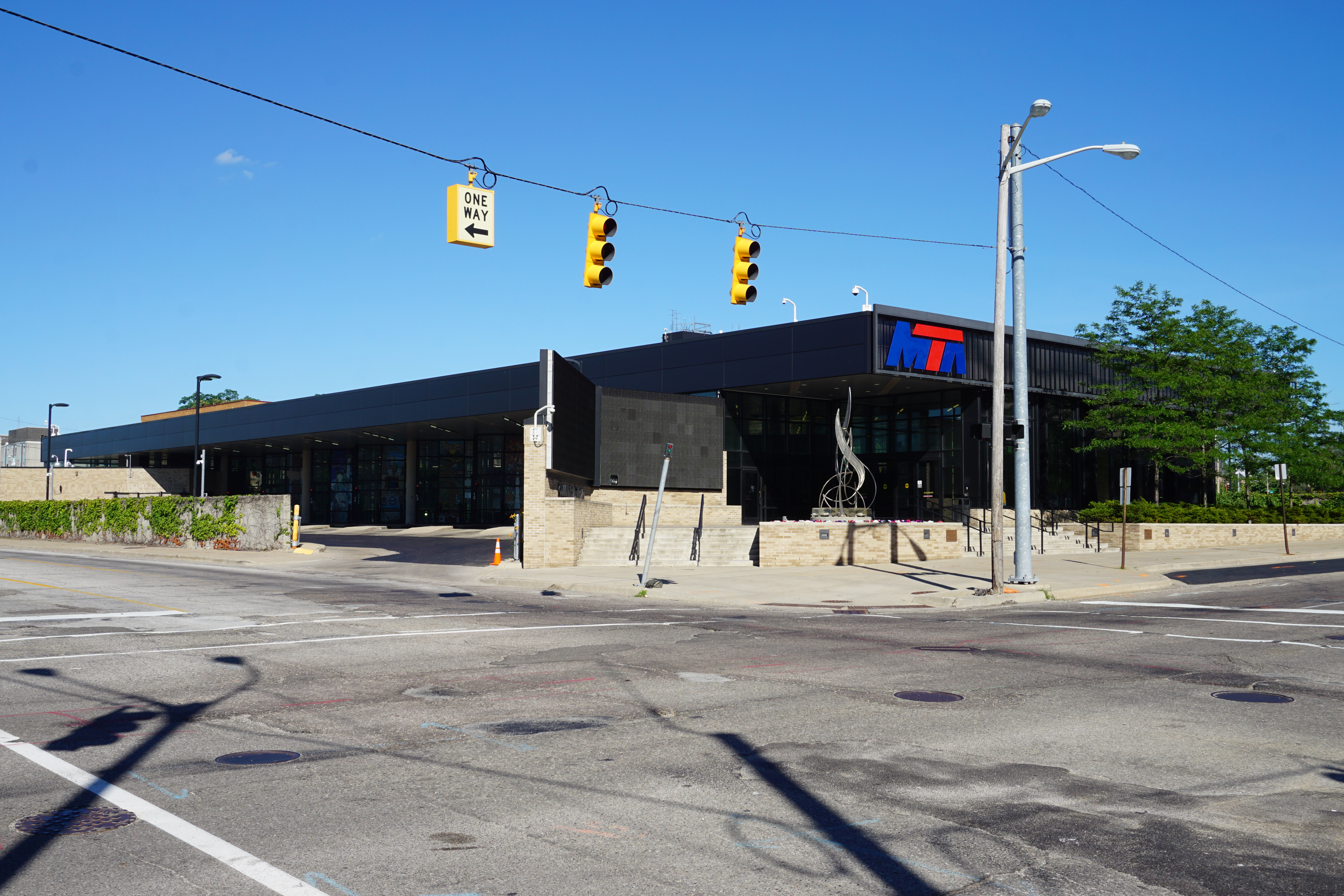
MTA Transit Center

=== Bus lines ===
The city of Flint is served by various bus lines. For travel within and around the city, the Flint Mass Transportation Authority (MTA) provides local bus services. Indian Trails provides inter-city bus service north to Saint Ignace, through Bay City and south to Pontiac, Southfield, and Detroit, and runs services west to Chicago. MTA's main hub is in Downtown Flint, while the Indian Trails station is co-located at the Flint Amtrak station on Dort Highway, just north of I-69.

=== Major highways ===
- I-69 runs east and west through Flint.
- I-75 / US 23 runs north and south through the southwestern part of the city near the General Motors Flint Assembly complex and Bishop International Airport.
- I-475 runs north and south through Flint.
- M-21 (also known as Corunna Road and Court Street) runs nearly due east and west through Flint, west of I-475
- M-54, also known as Dort Highway after Flint automotive pioneer Josiah Dallas Dort, runs north and south through the eastern part of the city.

=== Railroads ===
Amtrak provides intercity passenger rail service on the Blue Water line from Chicago to Port Huron at the border to Canada. The Amtrak station is located on Dort Highway, just north of I-69. The station was built in 1989 and replaced an earlier Grand Trunk Western Railroad (GTW) station closer to downtown. Canadian National Railway (GTW's successor) and Lake State Railway provide freight service to Flint, with CN operating from Bristol Yard on the western side of the city and LSRC operating from the former CSX Transportation McGrew Yard to the north. While CSX ceded control of their former Saginaw Subdivision north of Plymouth to LSRC in 2019, they continue to operate trackage rights trains over CN from Flint to Port Huron several times per week as of 2020. Into the late 1940s, the Pere Marquette Railway operated daily passenger trains through a separate station 1 1/4 miles away, with trains heading north to Saginaw and Bay City and south to Detroit's Fort Street Union Depot.

=== Airports ===
Flint is served by three passenger and two cargo airlines at Bishop International Airport. It is located on Bristol Road between I-75 and I-69. Dalton Airport, a public use airport near Flushing, also serves small, privately owned planes. Price's Airport in Linden serves the same purpose.

=== Healthcare ===
- Hurley Medical Center
- McLaren Regional Medical Center
- Flint once had two other full service hospitals: St. Joseph's Hospital and Flint Osteopathic Hospital (FOH). In 1988, HealthSource Group, the parent company of FOH, became affiliated with St. Joseph Health Systems. In 1992, St. Joseph Health Systems changed its name to Genesys Health System and the names of its four hospitals to Genesys Regional Medical Center (GRMC). On February 15, 1997, all the former GHS hospitals were consolidated into one hospital at Genesys Regional Medical Center at Health Park in suburban Grand Blanc Township (now owned by Ascension Health who later changed its name to Ascension Genesys Hospital) and Flint Osteopathic Hospital was razed during the Spring/Summer of 2015.

== Sister cities ==
Flint has four sister cities, as designated by Sister Cities International:

- Changchun, Jilin, China
- Hamilton, Ontario, Canada
- Kielce, Świętokrzyskie Voivodeship, Poland
- Tolyatti, Samara Oblast, Russia

== Books ==
The following notable books are set in Flint or relate to the city.

Fiction

- The Watsons Go to Birmingham - 1963 by Christopher Paul Curtis
- Bud, Not Buddy by Christopher Paul Curtis
- Elijah of Buxton by Christopher Paul Curtis
- The Mighty Miss Malone by Christopher Paul Curtis
- Daddy Cool by Donald Goines
- The Ghosts of Flint by Anna Lardinois
- Urbantasm (book series) by Connor Coyne

Non-Fiction

- What the Eyes Don't See by Dr. Mona Hanna-Attisha
- Hanging On by Edmund G. Love
- Teardown: Memoir of a Vanishing City by Gordon Young
- The Poisoned City: Flint's Water and Urban Tragedy by Anna Clark
- Haunted Flint by Roxanne Rhoades and Joe Shipping
- Rivethead: Tales from the Assembly Line by Ben Hamper

== Music ==
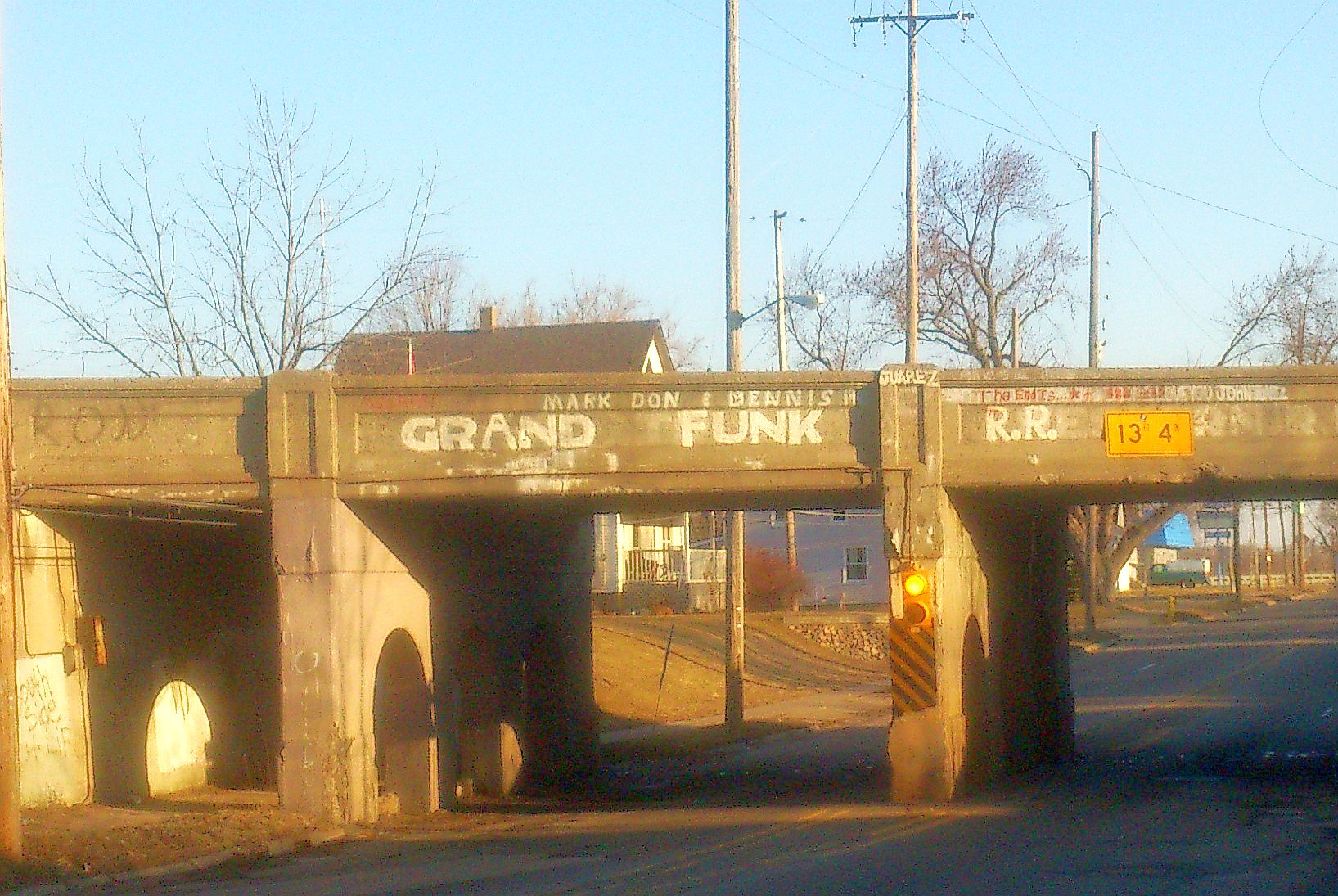
A railroad bridge in Flint re-painted to show the name of rock band Grand Funk Railroad, which was formed in the city in 1969.

Flint is currently home to an emerging rap scene, pioneered by artists like Rio Da Yung OG, Bfb Da Packman, and YN Jay. Flint rap, greatly influenced by Detroit drill, is characterized by bouncy drums, menacing melodic elements, and commonly a tresillo rhythm in the 808. Many artists use a laidback, almost nonchalant, vocal delivery. Flint rappers have gained notoriety for their outlandish, vulgar, and often comical lyrics.

- Flint is the subject of the Sufjan Stevens song "Flint (For the Unemployed and Underpaid)" featured on his album Michigan.
- Flint is the main focus for music group King 810 crediting it as "Murder Town" and their life growing up during the increase of crime rates during the 2000s. Also creating the songs "Crow's Feet" and "We Gotta Help Ourselves" to raise money toward the current water crisis happening in the city
- Flint was home to MC Breed, the first commercially successful rapper to come from the Midwest.
- Flint was where rock band Grand Funk Railroad was formed in 1969.
- Kansas City rapper Tech N9ne mentioned its water problems in his song "Poisoning the well"
- Flint is likely the subject of "Near DT, MI" by the English rock band Black Midi.
- Flint is the hometown of the award-winning Pop/RnB group Ready For The World.
- Flint is the hometown of shoegaze band Greet Death.

== Film and television ==
The following films and television shows have taken place or were filmed in Flint.

=== Television ===
- Nash Bridges (1996-2001): In one of the last episodes of the show, the character Michelle jokes to a man soon to be sent to live in Flint through the witness protection program that the city is similar to Paris. The man, from a foreign country, does not realize she is joking and is looking forward to his arrival in Flint.
- The Fitzpatricks (1977–78): A CBS TV drama about an Irish Catholic working-class family living in Flint. The show was filmed in Hollywood but set in Flint. Also, the families were portrayed as steelworkers, not autoworkers.
- Flint Town (2018): A Netflix documentary about the struggling urban areas of the city.
- TV Nation (1994–1995) was the debut TV series by Michael Moore. Numerous segments were filmed in and around Flint, including one where Moore uses declassified information to find the exact impact point from the nuclear ICBM that targeted the city (ground zero was Chevrolet Assembly, one of the General Motors plants at Bluff & Cadillac Streets). Moore then went to Kazakhstan to try to redirect the ICBM away from Flint.
- The Awful Truth (1999–2000) was Michael Moore's second TV show. It featured segments from Flint.
- The Flint Police Department has appeared in the 31st season of the reality show Cops, airing in the summer of 2018 and winter of 2019.
- Flint Police also appeared in a 2015 episode on TNT's Cold Justice: Sex Crimes, which paid to test old rape kits that resulted in convictions of three people for criminal sexual conduct.

=== Movies ===
- To Touch a Child (1962): A look into Community Schools, a concept pioneered by Charles Stewart Mott and spread throughout the United States.
- With Babies and Banners: Story of the Women's Emergency Brigade (1979): Documentary about the women of the Flint Sit-Down Strike.
- Roger & Me (1989): Michael Moore documentary about the economic depression in the Flint area caused by the closure of several General Motors factories in the late 1980s.
- Pets or Meat: The Return to Flint (1992): Follow-up of Roger & Me.
- The Big One (1998) Documentary film in which Moore urges Nike to consider building a shoe factory in Flint. Moore succeeds in convincing Nike CEO Philip Knight to match his offer to donate money to Buell Elementary School, which would eventually become the locale of the infamous Kayla Rolland shooting.
- Shattered Faith (2001): Independent (Fifth Sun Productions) film written and directed by Flint native Stephen Vincent. The movie was filmed in Flint. The cast was made mostly of Flint residents but did feature Joe Estevez. Vincent's multi-year project debuted September 20, 2001, and was released directly to DVD.
- Bowling for Columbine (2002): Moore's take on the gun industry also profiles the shooting of Kayla Rolland.
- Chameleon Street (1990): Wendell B. Harris Jr.'s story of famed con man Douglas Street. Winner of the Grand Jury Prize at Sundance.
- The Real Blair Witch (2003): Documentary about a group of Flint teenagers kidnapping and terrorizing a fellow student.
- The Michigan Independent (2004): Documentary film about the Michigan independent music community. Many segments were shot in Flint, particularly at the Flint Local 432.
- Fahrenheit 9/11 (2004): Moore takes on the George W. Bush administration. Moore filmed students from Flint Southwestern Academy. Filmed Marine recruiters at Courtland Center and references Genesee Valley Center as a mall for more wealthy citizens, "The rich mall in the suburbs." However, Courtland Center is in Burton, also a Flint suburb.
- Michael Moore Hates America (2004): Filmmaker Mike Wilson travels to Flint to document small businesses and other development efforts in the city, and compares it to the depictions of the city in Moore's documentaries.
- Flintown Kids (2005): Documentary film about violence in Flint.
- Semi-Pro (2008): Will Ferrell movie, which centers around a fictitious 1970s ABA basketball team, the Flint Tropics. It was partially filmed in Flint.
- Capitalism: A Love Story (2009) A Michael Moore documentary about the negative impacts capitalism can have on people and communities.
- The Ides of March (2011): A feature film starring Ryan Gosling and George Clooney. Certain scenes were shot around downtown Flint, near the Capitol Theatre and the alley around it.
- Minor League (2011): A feature film starring Robert Miano, music artist Bone Crusher, Dustin Diamond, and Brad Leo Lyon. Numerous scenes were shot around Flint, including at Atwood Stadium, where the story's central Football team played their games.
- Little Creeps (2012): A feature film starring Joe Estevez, Dustin Diamond, and Lark Voorhees of Saved By the Bell fame (Screech and Lisa, respectively), Jake the Snake Roberts, Brad Leo Lyon, and Robert Z'Dar. Restaurant and nightclub scenes were shot at locations in Flint.
- The Watsons go to Birmingham, 1963: (2013) A movie about an African-American family who go towards Birmingham, Alabama, during the darkest moments of the civil rights movement to teach the oldest child of the family that life isn't a joke. First half of the movie was filmed in Flint.
- Thursday the 12th (2017): A feature film starring Jenna Simms, Brad Leo Lyon, Marilyn Ghigliotti, and Brian Sutherland. Approximately half of this film was shot in Flint, Michigan, while the rest of the movie was wrapped in Jackson, Michigan, and Savannah, Georgia.
- Don't Drink the Water (2017): A Brad Leo Lyon documentary film about the water crisis in Flint, Michigan and other communities.
- Fahrenheit 11/9 (2018): Michael Moore takes on the presidential election campaign of 2016, the victory of Donald Trump, the reasons behind the failure of the Democrats to win middle America. The Flint water crisis and the role of both political parties in creating and sustaining the crisis is highlighted.
- Life in Flint (2018): A documentary with testimonials from numerous residents about the positive aspects of the city.

== See also ==
- Back to the Bricks
- Citizens Republic Bancorp
- History of General Motors
- USS Flint, 3 ships
