= WFBE =

Radio station in Flint, Michigan

- Flint, Michigan; United States
- Broadcast area: Flint, Michigan
- Frequency: 95.1 MHz
- Branding: B95

Programming
- Format: Country
- Affiliations: Westwood One

Ownership
- Owner: Cumulus Media; (Radio License Holding CBC, LLC)
- Sister stations: WDZZ-FM; WWCK; WWCK-FM

History
- First air date: October 5, 1953
- Call sign meaning: Flint Board of Education (former owners)

Technical information
- Licensing authority: FCC
- Facility ID: 21730
- Class: B
- Power: 34,000 watts
- HAAT: 97 meters (318 ft)
- Transmitter coordinates: 42°58′24″N 83°39′2″W

Links
- Public license information: Public file; LMS
- Webcast: Listen live
- Website: www.wfbe95.com

WFBE (95.1 FM, "B95") is a commercial radio station licensed to Flint, Michigan, United States. Owned by Cumulus Media, the station features a country music format. Its studios are on Taylor Drive in Mundy Township, using a Flint address.

The transmitter is on East Bristol Road near South Dort Highway in Burton.

== History ==
=== Flint Board of Education ===
The station signed on the air on October 5, 1953. WFBE was owned by the Flint Board of Education and the studios were on the campus of Flint Central High School for many years. It was a non-commercial, public radio station which also offered educational programs.

In 1997, the Flint Board of Education was in a serious budget shortfall. It could no longer afford to maintain the station and the board members decided the schools could use the money from a sale.

=== Liggett, Rainbow and Citadel ownership ===
Though many listeners were upset about the sale of this public outlet, 95.1 was sold to Liggett Communications of Lansing, Michigan. Even though it was a non-commercial radio station, WFBE operated on a commercial frequency. After the sale was finalized, Liggett moved the studios to Miller Road.

WFBE was later purchased by Rainbow Radio but it did not keep the station long. Citadel Broadcasting purchased B95 from Rainbow Radio in February 2000. The transmitting tower was originally located on Flint Board of Education property, first on the Oak Grove Campus, then Flint Central High School. The station vacated the high school when new transmitting facilities became operational in 2010 at the co-owned transmitting facilities of WTRX. The old broadcast tower was taken down on October of that year.

=== Cumulus and Nash-FM ===
Citadel merged with Cumulus Media on September 16, 2011. WFBE relocated to Cumulus' Taylor Drive studios in March 2012.

On February 3, 2014, WFBE and nine other Cumulus-owned country music stations made the switch to Nash-FM branding. It also added some national Nash-FM programs to its schedule. On April 1, 2021, WFBE rebranded back to "B95" after seven years.

== Previous Logo ==
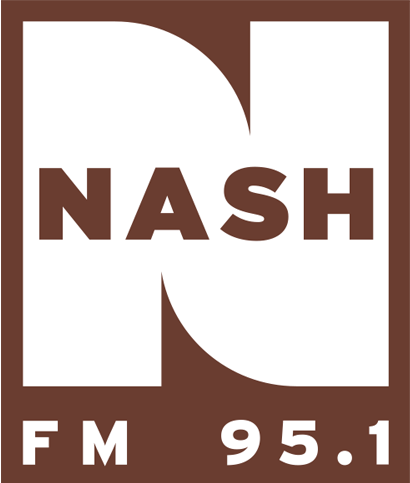
