= WFLT =

Flint, Michigan; United States
- Broadcast area: (Daytime) (Nighttime)
- Frequency: 1420 kHz
- Branding: Best Variety of Gospel Music

Programming
- Format: Urban Gospel

Ownership
- Owner: Christian Evangelical Broadcasting Association

History
- First air date: December 9, 1955
- Former call signs: WAMM (1955–1980)
- Call sign meaning: Flint, Michigan; or What Flint Listens To

Technical information
- Licensing authority: FCC
- Class: D
- Power: 500 watts (Daytime); 142 watts (Nighttime)
- Transmitter coordinates: 43°01′19″N 83°38′35″W

Links
- Public license information: Public file; LMS

WFLT (1420 AM) is a radio station broadcasting an Urban Gospel format. Licensed to Flint, Michigan, United States, it first began broadcasting as WAMM on December 9, 1955.

As WAMM, 1420 AM was the area's premier African-American-oriented R&B station for years. The station also provided an early on-air job for future American Top 40 host Casey Kasem (who moved on to WJBK in Detroit and then to Los Angeles). Though primarily targeted to black listeners, WAMM had many white listeners as well.

In the fall of 1979, WDZZ-FM signed on as Flint's first urban FM station and quickly became a ratings success. WAMM never recovered, and went off the air on December 30, 1981. The station adopted Al Ham's Music of Your Life format on December 31, changing its calls to the current WFLT. The station soon switched to religious programming and was purchased in 1990 by the Christian Evangelical Broadcasting Association, the current owners, who converted the station back to its African-American-oriented roots, but this time as the successful gospel-music station that it still is today.
