= Crime in Flint, Michigan =

Crime in Flint, Michigan, has been a serious issue for more than a decade. Since the late-2000s, Flint has consistently ranked among the most violent cities in the United States. Law enforcement in Flint is primarily the responsibility of the Flint Police Department, which is often assisted by the Genesee County Sheriff's Department and the Michigan State Police, which maintains a post in adjacent Flint Township that serves all of Genesee County, as well as the Genesee County Parks and Recreation Commission Police and the campus police departments of the University of Michigan–Flint, Kettering University, and Mott Community College.

== Flint Police Department ==
The Flint Police Department (a.k.a. Flint PD or FPD) is the primary law enforcement agency in the city, led by Chief Terence Green. In recent decades, it has faced significant downsizing due to population decline and the ongoing economic depression in the city.

Between 2008 and 2010, mayor Dayne Walling reduced the number of patrol-level police officers from 208 to 67. The total number of police officer positions fell by 141, due to a combination of layoffs, resignations, and retirements

On September 28, 2011, the Flint Police Department was awarded $1,225,638 from the Department of Justice's Community Oriented Policing Services (COPS) program to re-hire 6 laid off patrol officers. The officers were scheduled to be on the job starting in October 2011.

On June 18, 2012, Michigan Governor Rick Snyder visited Flint and announced additional state troopers would be sent to Flint and that additional state money would be provided to Flint for the city jail. Additionally, on the same day, state representative Jim Ananich proposed the Michigan State Housing Development Authority give state money from the federal foreclosure benefit fund to the Flint Police Department to hire more officers. A month later on July 17, 2012, Ananich reiterated his push to secure those funds from the state. He also pointed out that scrap metal thefts are on the rise in the city, and proposed a portion of the $97 million fund be set aside to prevent them, which he claimed will also benefit the local economy by attracting new businesses to the city.

In fiscal year 2015, Flint PD received funding from both the SAKI (Sexual Assault Kit Initiative) and the New York County District Attorney's Office, to fund two full-time police investigators to address the city's backlog of unsubmitted sexual assault kits (SAKs).

Flint PD's newest squad is the Crime Area Target Team, formed by Chief Tim Johnson in April 2016. It concentrates on combating the illegal narcotics trafficking and firearms trades. In February 2017, it confiscated $20,000 street value crystal methamphetamine, $20,000 street value heroin, nearly $10,000 worth of powder cocaine, $2,300 worth of crack cocaine, $30,000 worth of marijuana, $1,500 in psilocybin mushrooms, $1,500 of illegal prescription medications, and about $34,000 cash. This resulted in 126 arrests, 238 new felonies, 82 new misdemeanors, 22 felony warrants, 19 misdemeanors, 30 guns confiscated and 30 vehicles impounded.

On January 15, 2025, it was announced that the Flint and Saginaw police departments are in discussion to implement new adjustments to the "Secure Cities Partnership" with the Michigan State Police that has been in place since 2012. Currently, 28 state police personnel have been assigned to work in Finch. Although Flint Police Detective Sergeant Tyrone Booth has declared that "we do not anticipate any changes to our violent crime task force, which consists of personnel from the City of Flint Police Department and Michigan State Police troopers.", some reports indicate the partnership may be ending and residents have expressed concerns over it.

=== In popular culture ===
The Flint Police Department was featured in a 2015 episode of TNT's Cold Justice: Sex Crimes, which paid to test old rape kits that resulted in convictions of three people for criminal sexual conduct.

The Flint Police Department appeared in four episodes of the 31st season of the reality show Cops, aired in mid 2018 and early 2019. The episodes were titled "Three's Company", "Out the Window", "Slow and Low", and "Spinning Out".

The Flint Police Department (and the Flint water crisis) is also the subject of the eight-part 2018 Netflix documentary Flint Town, which was recorded in 2016.

== Historical crime trends ==
The following statistics are derived from the annual Federal Bureau of Investigation (FBI) Uniform Crime Reports.

Year	Population	Violent crime	Murder/manslaughter	Rape (Note: The reporting definition of rape was changed in 2013, reducing the ability to directly compare with previous years. Further information is available from the FBI)	Robbery	Aggravated assault	Property crime	Burglary	Larceny/theft	Motor vehicle theft	Arson
2005	119,814	2,708	48	105	566	1,989	7,709	2,634	3,492	1,583	188
2006	118,256	3,070	54	143	627	2,246	8,117	3,058	3,538	1,521	186
2007	116,024	2,741	30	109	665	1,937	7,246	3,241	2,965	1,040	240
2008	113,462	2,297	32	103	686	1,476	6,889	3,273	2,707	909	145
2009	111,657	2,244	36	91	590	1,527	6,397	3,057	2,664	676	173
2010	109,245	2,412	53	92	670	1,597	6,237	3,648	1,936	653	343
2011	102,357	2,392	52	85	607	1,648	6,618	3,628	2,220	770	287
2012	101,632	2,774	63	108	673	1,930	5,645	2,979	2,207	459	226
2013	99,941	1,907	48	145	447	1,267	4,261	1,941	2,000	320	110
2014	99,166	1,694	28	115	277	1,274	3,891	1,677	1,944	270	133
2015	98,221	1,451	47	77	272	1,055	3,538	1,391	1,880	267	79
2016	97,548	1,545	45	96	249	1,155	3,323	1,213	1,867	243	63
2017	96,448	1,879	37	104	272	1,466	2,632	961	1,397	274	
2018	95,943	1,739	32	130	189	1,388	2,584	796	1,488	300	
2019	95,212	1,284	23	64	78	1,119	1,986	559	1,220	207	

== Most dangerous city in the U.S. ==
Flint has been consistently ranked as one of the most dangerous cities in the United States by multiple sources. From 2007 to 2009, violent crime in Flint was ranked in the top five among U.S. cities with a population of at least 50,000 people. From 2010 to 2012, Flint ranked as the city with the highest violent crime rate among cities with over 100,000 population. In 2015, CQ Press (using FBI statistics) ranked the crime index for Flint as 7th-highest in cities with population greater than 75,000.

== Unsolved crime ==
Unsolved crimes remained high in Flint. In 2008, only 19 of 32 homicides resulted in convictions; in 2009, only 12 of 36 homicides led to conviction; and, in 2010, only 31 of 64 homicides led to conviction.
