= WMRP-LP =

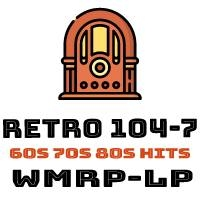
- Mundy Township, Michigan; United States
- Broadcast area: Mundy Township, Michigan; Grand Blanc, Michigan; Swartz Creek, Michigan
- Frequency: 104.7 MHz
- Branding: Retro 104-7

Programming
- Format: oldies

Ownership
- Owner: SWC Concerts, Inc

History
- First air date: 2008
- Call sign meaning: "Methodist Radio Parish"

Technical information
- Licensing authority: FCC
- Facility ID: 126791
- Class: L1
- ERP: 100 watts
- HAAT: 29 meters (95 ft)
- Transmitter coordinates: 42°54′59″N 83°41′33″W

Links
- Public license information: LMS
- Website: www.wmrp.org

WMRP-LP (104.7 FM), branded Retro 104.7 is an oldies formatted broadcast radio station licensed to Mundy Township, Michigan, serving the Mundy Township/Grand Blanc area. WMRP-LP is owned and operated by SWC Concerts, Inc.

== History ==
WMRP-LP went on the air in March 2008, but its call sign dates back to 1946, when the now WWCK, used it as part of its MOR format and as a broadcast "arm" of the United Methodist Church, from which the station gets its call sign meaning.

In 1964, WMRP would spawn an FM station, known as WMRP-FM, which today is WWCK-FM.

Neither of the two stations has any other relation to today's WMRP-LP 104.7 than this.

In January 2011, WMRP-LP 104.7 changed from adult contemporary Christian music as "Ark 104.7" to a Christian country format. It was one of three such radio stations in Michigan as of May 2015.

On November 18, 2023, it switched to an oldies format with music from the 1960s to the 1980s.
