= USS Flint =

USS Flint may refer to the following ships of the United States Navy:

- USS Flint (CL-64), was renamed Vincennes (CL-64) on 16 October 1942 before being launched on 17 July 1943
- USS Flint (CL-97), was commissioned 31 August 1944 and decommissioned 6 May 1947
- USS Flint (AE-32), was commissioned 20 November 1971, decommissioned 4 August 1995 and is currently in service with Military Sealift Command
