= WDZZ-FM =

- Flint, Michigan; United States
- Broadcast area: Flint, Michigan
- Frequency: 92.7 MHz
- Branding: Z92.7

Programming
- Format: Urban adult contemporary
- Affiliations: Premiere Networks

Ownership
- Owner: Cumulus Media; (Cumulus Licensing LLC)
- Sister stations: WFBE; WWCK; WWCK-FM

History
- First air date: September 29, 1979
- Call sign meaning: "Dazz" (named after song by R&B group Brick)

Technical information
- Licensing authority: FCC
- Facility ID: 13665
- Class: A
- ERP: 3,000 watts
- HAAT: 100 meters
- Transmitter coordinates: 43°02′29″N 83°41′28″W

Links
- Public license information: Public file; LMS
- Webcast: Listen live
- Website: www.wdzz.com

WDZZ-FM (92.7 MHz, "Z92.7") is a radio station broadcasting an urban adult contemporary format, licensed to Flint, Michigan, and under ownership of Cumulus Media. Its studios are located south of the Flint city limits and its transmitter is north of downtown Flint.

== History ==
WDZZ was founded by Vernon Merritt in 1979 as the Flint area's first FM station to target African-American audiences, playing a mixture of disco music and jazz which eventually evolved into mainstream Urban Contemporary. It is believed that the call letters were a tribute to the song "Dazz" by the group Brick; "Dazz" was an amalgamation of "disco" and "jazz".

Before the sign-on of 92.7, WAMM 1420 now WFLT served as Flint's Rhythm & Blues Station, with its only competition being Saginaw's WWWS which did not provide a clear signal over much of the Flint area. WDZZ had an immediate impact, as the station debuted at number one in the Arbitron ratings in its first full ratings period (which was Spring 1980, as Flint was only measured by Arbitron once per year at that time), with a share of over 11 per cent. WAMM never recovered and soon flipped formats to the Music of Your Life as WFLT, eventually settling into the urban gospel format it has today.

WDZZ would become Mainstream Urban with the addition of Hip Hop in 1989 and was using the Moniker "DZ93".

WDZZ has gone through several R&B formats including Mainstream Urban (including rap and hip-hop tracks) and Gospel on Sunday Mornings. The station is licensed for and formerly broadcast in HD Radio, the only one of Cumulus Media's Flint stations to do so. In 1998 WDZZ, WWCK-FM, and WRSR were sold from Connoisseur to Cumulus Media.

Current DJs include Rickey Smiley, August, Big Tone, DJ Chef Nate, Keith Sweat and Sunday Morning Gospel Host Eugene Brown.

WDZZ-FM was named a finalist for Urban Station of the Year for the 2025 and 2026 NAB Marconi Awards.

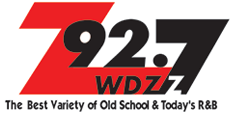
Logo under previous slogan
