= WWCK (AM) =

Currently silent
- Flint, Michigan; United States
- Frequency: 1570 kHz

Programming
- Format: Adult contemporary

Ownership
- Owner: Cumulus Media; (Cumulus Licensing LLC)
- Sister stations: WDZZ-FM; WFBE; WWCK-FM

History
- First air date: November 11, 1946
- Former call signs: WMRP (1946–1971); WCZN (1971–1976); WLQB (1976–1981); WWMN (1981–1984); WGMZ (1984–1986)
- Call sign meaning: reminiscent of CKLW

Technical information
- Licensing authority: FCC
- Facility ID: 39679
- Class: D
- Power: 1,000 watts (day); 179 watts (night)
- Transmitter coordinates: 43°00′39.1″N 83°39′2.8″W
- Translator: 107.3 W297CG (Flint)

Links
- Public license information: Public file; LMS

WWCK (1570 AM) is a commercial radio station licensed to Flint, Michigan, United States, that is currently silent. Owned by Cumulus Media, it last broadcast an adult contemporary format, with studios located south of the Flint city limits, and AM transmitter located east of downtown Flint along Lapeer Rd just east of Dort Hwy.

Programming was also heard on FM translator W297CG at 107.3 MHz.

== History ==
The station signed on the air on November 11, 1946. As WMRP (Methodist Radio Parish) in the 1960s, it served as a broadcast ministry of the United Methodist Church, featuring MOR music with some Christian talk and teaching shows. The conservative owners of WMRP-AM and WMRP-FM 105.5 (unrelated to today's current WMRP-LP at 104.7) refused to allow any cigarette or alcohol advertising on the stations.

The United Methodist Church decided to sell WMRP-AM/FM in 1971, and the stations were purchased that year by John W. Nogaj, who converted 105.5 to Top 40 and later album rock as WWCK (the calls being a tribute to CKLW in Windsor, Ontario).

The new owner installed a country music format on AM 1570 with the new call sign WCZN ("Your Country Cousin"). The country format was replaced by oldies as "Solid Gold 16" in 1974. In 1975, following the sale of WWCK and WCZN to Reams Broadcasting, WWCK-FM went full-time album rock, and WCZN picked up the Top 40 format.

This was followed by religious programming as WLQB (1976), a female-oriented talk/adult contemporary format as WWMN (1981), and beautiful music/easy listening as WGMZ (picking up the calls and format that were dropped by 107.9 FM when it became WCRZ in 1984).

In 1986, AM 1570 became WWCK and began to simulcast WWCK-FM (which switched from AOR to a CHR format on January the 1st of 1989 following the sale of the stations from Reams Broadcasting to Majac of Michigan). Originally a daytime-only station on a Mexican clear channel, a treaty signed between the American and Mexican governments allowed the station to broadcast full-time at reduced power at night in 1986.

Cumulus Media took control of WWCK-AM/FM in March 2000, and a year later, WWCK dropped its simulcast of the FM station in favor of urban contemporary gospel music via ABC Radio's "Rejoice - Musical Soul Food" network. The Gospel format lasted four years.

On March 1, 2004, WWCK switched to a talk radio format. This allowed Flint to once again have a talk station of its own following WFDF AM 910's move into the Detroit radio market as a Radio Disney network affiliate. WWCK featured a roster of mainly syndicated conservative talk show hosts including Mark Levin, John Batchelor and Red Eye Radio.

News, weather, sports, and traffic reports were provided by anchors from WJRT-TV, state news from The Michigan News Network and national/international news from Westwood One News. Weekend programs and hosts included Kim Komando, Joe Pags, Bob Brinker, Leo LaPorte, USA Financial Headquarters, Free Talk Live, and Mike Avery's Outdoor Magazine.

On January 1, 2021, WWCK changed its format from talk to classic hits, branded as "K107.3". It also carries Michigan State Spartans football and men's basketball games.

Cumulus Media suspended operations of the station and its FM translator on March 29, 2025. On March 5, 2026, WWCK and its translator resumed operation, with Cumulus submitting a resumption of operations letter to the Federal Communications Commission on March 9, 2026. On March 30, 2026, Cumulus Media once again took WWCK and W297CG silent, 25 days after resuming operations. The latest Silent Special Temporary Authority (STA) was filed on April 6, 2026. Mentioned in an attached file on the STA request Cumulus is in negotiations with a potential buyer of the station, no details were mentioned on who the buyer is.
