= WWCK-FM =

- Flint, Michigan; United States
- Broadcast area: Flint
- Frequency: 105.5 MHz (HD Radio)
- Branding: CK-105.5

Programming
- Format: Top 40 (CHR)
- Affiliations: Westwood One

Ownership
- Owner: Cumulus Media; (Cumulus Licensing LLC)
- Sister stations: WDZZ; WFBE; WWCK

History
- First air date: September 1964 (as WMRP-FM)
- Former call signs: WMRP-FM (1964-1971)
- Call sign meaning: reminiscent of CKLW

Technical information
- Licensing authority: FCC
- Facility ID: 39678
- Class: B1
- Power: 25,000 watts
- HAAT: 100 meters
- Transmitter coordinates: 43°00′39″N 83°39′4″W

Links
- Public license information: Public file; LMS
- Webcast: Listen live
- Website: www.wwck.com

WWCK-FM (105.5 MHz, "CK105.5") is a radio station in Flint, Michigan, broadcasting a top 40 (CHR) format. The station is owned by Cumulus Media and has programmed its current format since 1989. Its studios are located south of the Flint city limits and its transmitter is east of downtown Flint near the intersection of Dort Highway and Interstate 69, from a facility shared with its AM sister station WWCK. Its signal can reach as far west as Lansing, Michigan, as far south as Pontiac, Michigan, as far east as Imlay City, Michigan and as far north as Bay City, Michigan

== History ==
=== Early history: WMRP ===
The station originally went on the air in 1964 as WMRP-FM. The WMRP calls stood for Methodist Radio Parish. WMRP-FM aired a beautiful music format while WMRP (1570 AM) played MOR; the conservative owners of the stations prohibited any advertising for tobacco or alcohol products.

=== WWCK is born as FM 105 Flint's Best Rock ===
In 1971, the United Methodist Church withdrew support for WMRP-AM-FM, and the stations were sold that year to John W. Nogaj, who changed the FM's call letters to WWCK in November 1971 as a tribute to Windsor, Ontario's powerhouse CKLW and installed a daytime Top 40 and nighttime AOR format. AM 1570 went country and later oldies as WCZN.

John sold WCZN and WWCK in 1975 to Reams Broadcasting who changed WWCK's format in October 1975 to full time AOR. As "WWCK FM 105, Flint's Best Rock" and then as "WWCK FM 105, Rock Of The Eighties". WWCK-FM was a market leader in Flint for many years, and it was named as the top rated rock station in all of the United States in 1985, WWCK-FM was also the home of WWCK's DJ turned-filmmaker Michael Moore's Sunday night show "Radio Free Flint" from 1980 through 1985 and "Buffalo Dick's Radio Ranch" with Jeffrey Lamb and future voice actor himself Robert Paulsen was voted as "The Best Local Programming In All Markets" by Billboard Magazine in 1982.

=== WWCK goes into CHR/Top 40 as CK 105 FM ===
In December 1988, Reams Broadcasting sold WWCK and WWCK-FM to Majac of Michigan, On January 1, 1989, Majac officially changed WWCK-FM's format from an AOR station to a CHR/Top 40 station as "The All New CK 105 FM" with WWCK AM serving as a shadowcast of FM 105. This marked the first time Flint had a second FM CHR/Top 40 hHit music radio station of its own since WTAC changed from Top 40 to country in 1981. The fans of the old FM 105 era were unhappy with the change, but WWCK's new format took off in the ratings and gain some new fans as in the CHR fanbase as CK 105 posted several number one showings (12+) in the Flint Arbitron reports throughout the 1990s. CK 105.5 is typically still a top ten ratings performer in Flint.

WWCK-FM was once housed at its transmitter location on Lapeer Rd. During the 1990s WWCK-FM allowed requests at the studio window. It was also common for wedding parties to stop by the studio for shout outs and such.
