= Deaths in June 1992 =

The following is a list of notable deaths in June 1992.

Entries for each day are listed alphabetically by surname. A typical entry lists information in the following sequence:

- Name, age, country of citizenship at birth, subsequent country of citizenship (if applicable), reason for notability, cause of death (if known), and reference.

== June 1992 ==
=== 1 ===
- Karl-Heinz Freiberger, 51, German Olympic field hockey player (1964, 1968).
- Eve Gardiner, 78, English beautician and remedial make-up artist.
- Niels Heilbuth, 85, Danish Olympic field hockey player (1928).
- George Jablonski, 72, American basketball player.
- Anatoli Porkhunov, 63, Soviet footballer.
- Yrjö Sotiola, 79, Finnish football player and Olympian (1936).
- Delia Villegas Vorhauer, 52, American social worker.
- Adele Wiseman, 64, Canadian author.

=== 2 ===
- Gerd Boder, 58, German composer.
- Jess Brooks, 79, American baseball player.
- Glenn Dixon, 83, American baseball player.
- Philip Dunne, 84, American screenwriter (How Green Was My Valley, The Ghost and Mrs. Muir, The Robe), cancer.
- Endre Győrfi, 72, Hungarian Olympic water polo player (1948).
- Antonio Herin, 92, Italian Olympic cross-country skier (1924).
- Ryoji Naraoka, 84, Japanese Olympic racewalker (1936).
- Donald Nichols, 69, United States Air Force intelligence officer.
- Alexandru Nicolschi, 76, communist activist, Soviet agent and officer, and Securitate chief, with the rank of Lieutenant General.
- Sergio Paganella, 80, Italian Olympic basketball player (1936).
- Henri Zwiers, 92, Dutch architect.

=== 3 ===
- Ray Buker, 92, American track and field athlete and Olympian (1924).
- Ettore Campogalliani, 88, Italian composer, musician and teacher.
- Wilfried Dietrich, 58, German wrestler and Olympic champion (1956, 1960, 1964, 1968, 1972), heart attack.
- William Gaines, 70, American publisher (Mad), in 1947, he succeeded his deceased father at the head of the family's comic book publishing company EC Comics, he died in his sleep. Gaines had been in ill health for years, using a pacemaker.
- Robert Morley, 84, English actor (Marie Antoinette, The African Queen, Around the World in 80 Days), stroke.
- Patrick Peyton, 83, Irish-American Roman Catholic priest.

=== 4 ===
- Margherita Bontade, 91, Italian politician.
- Vladimir Chekalov, 69, Russian painter.
- Melvin Dresher, 81, Polish-born American mathematician.
- Geezil Minerve, 70, Cuban-American jazz musician.
- Siddhicharan Shrestha, 80, Nepalese poet.
- Carl Stotz, 82, American founder of Little League Baseball.

=== 5 ===
- Bob Chadwick, 65, Australian rules footballer.
- Max Lerner, 89, Russian-born American journalist.
- Narciso Martínez, 80, Mexican folk musician.
- Laurence Naismith, 83, English actor (Scrooge, A Night to Remember, Jason and the Argonauts).
- Ethel Reschke, 81, German actress.
- Franz Reuß, 88, German Luftwaffe general during World War II.

=== 6 ===
- Richard Eurich, 89, English painter.
- Martin Goodman, 84, American publisher and founder of Marvel Comics, pneumonia.
- Roger Hägglund, 30, Swedish ice hockey player (Quebec Nordiques, IF Björklöven), traffic collision.
- Arnie Knepper, 61, American racecar driver, cancer.
- E. Harold Munn, 88, American politician.
- Larry Riley, 39, American actor (Knots Landing, A Soldier's Story, Stir Crazy), AIDS-related kidney failure.
- Manfred Stengl, 46, Austrian Olympic luger (1964) and cyclist, racing collision.

=== 7 ===
- Bill France, 82, American businessman and racing driver, founder of NASCAR, Alzheimer's disease.
- Ina Halley, 65, German actress.
- Alexander Koldunov, 68, Soviet flying ace during World War II.
- Ivan Kramberger, 56, Slovenian writer, philanthropist, and politician, homicide.
- Max Nixon, 81, Australian rugby league footballer.
- Olav Rytter, 89, Norwegian journalist, newspaper editor, and radio personality.
- Bob Sweeney, 73, American television director (The Andy Griffith Show, Hogan's Heroes) and actor (Marnie), cancer.
- Bill Vanthoff, 83, Australian rules footballer.

=== 8 ===
- Atef Bseiso, 43, Palestinian PLO's liaison officer, homicide.
- Farag Foda, 46, Egyptian writer and human rights activist, murdered.
- Cesar Jayme, 74, Filipino Olympic sports shooter (1948, 1952, 1956, 1960).
- Alfred Uhl, 83, Austrian composer.
- Sakae Ōba, 78, Imperial Japanese Army officer during World War II.
- George Van Roggen, 70, Canadian politician, member of the Canada Senate (1971- ).

=== 9 ===
- Per Bergsland, 74, Norwegian fighter pilot, escapist from Stalag Luft III.
- Betty Miles, 82, American actress and stuntwoman.
- Big Miller, 69, American musician, heart attack.
- Fernando de Quintanilha e Mendonça Dias, 93, Portuguese admiral and colonial administrator.
- Eddie Vines, 74, American baseball player.

=== 10 ===
- Al Brightman, 68, American basketball player (Boston Celtics) and coach, cancer.
- Glyn Smallwood Jones, 84, British colonial administrator, liver failure.
- Svend Jørgensen, 87, Danish Olympic field hockey player (1948).
- Morris Kline, 84, American mathematician.
- William S. Mailliard, 75, American banker and politician, member of the United States House of Representatives (1953-1974).
- Hachidai Nakamura, 61, Japanese composer, diabetes.
- Nat Pierce, 66, American jazz pianist, composer and arranger.
- Hans Reiser, 73, German actor.
- Bert Sotlar, 71, Yugoslav film actor.

=== 11 ===
- John Freeman Loutit, 82, Australian radiobiologist.
- Rafael Orozco Maestre, 38, Colombian singer of vallenato music, shot.
- Alexander Spoehr, 78, American anthropologist.
- Jack Sullivan, 78, Canadian sports journalist.

=== 12 ===
- Allahverdi Baghirov, 46, Azerbaijani officer, politician and war hero, land mine.
- Serge Daney, 48, French movie critic, AIDS-related complications.
- Gerry Lynn, 36, Australian rules footballer (Hawthorn Football Club), plane crash.
- Harry Mallett, 77, Australian rules footballer.
- Randy Moore, 85, American baseball player.
- Gerda Nicolson, 54, Australian actress, cerebral hemorrhage.
- Renié, 90, American costume designer (Cleopatra, The President's Lady, The Big Fisherman), Oscar winner (1964).
- Klemens Rudnicki, 95, Polish Army general.

=== 13 ===
- Anatoly Nikolayevich Davidovich, 27, Azerbaijani sergeant and war hero, killed in action.
- Pumpuang Duangjan, 30, Thai pop singer, lupus.
- Edward Leslie Gray, 97, Canadian politician.
- Remziye Hisar, 89-90, Turkish chemist.
- Edwin C. Horrell, 89, American football player and coach.
- Carl Nordenfalk, 84, Swedish art historian and academic.
- Erik Paaske, 58, Danish actor and singer.
- Len Rice, 73, American baseball player (Cincinnati Reds, Chicago Cubs).
- Shikar Shikarov, 38, Azerbaijani soldier, killed in battle.
- Qu Wu, 93, Chinese military officer and politician.

=== 14 ===
- Carlos d'Alessio, 56, Argentine-French composer, AIDS-related complications.
- Alfie Evans, 75, Australian rules footballer.
- Paul Felinger, 78, Austrian Olympic canoeist (1948).
- Bernie Kaplan, 79, American football player (New York Giants, Philadelphia Eagles).
- Martin B. McKneally, 77, American politician, member of the United States House of Representatives (1969-1971).
- Thomas Nipperdey, 64, German historian.
- William Ross, 91, Canadian Olympic rower (1928).
- Mirasgar Seyidov, 22, Azerbaijani soldier and war hero, killed in action.

=== 15 ===
- Jean Aerts, 84, Belgian road bicycle racer and Olympian (1928).
- Amitabha Bhattacharyya, 60, Indian engineer.
- Lev Gumilyov, 79, Soviet historian, ethnologist, and anthropologist.
- Leo Halle, 86, Dutch football player.
- Kinji Imanishi, 90, Japanese ecologist and anthropologist.
- Eddie Lopat, 73, American baseball player (Chicago White Sox, New York Yankees, Baltimore Orioles), pancreatic cancer.
- Jay MacDowell, 72, American gridiron football player (Philadelphia Eagles).
- Chuck Menville, 52, American television writer (The Real Ghostbusters, The Smurfs, Sabrina the Teenage Witch), cancer.
- Chingiz Mustafayev, 31, Azerbaijani journalist, killed in action.
- Roque Olsen, 66, Argentine football player and manager.
- José Vidal Porcar, 67, Spanish cyclist.
- Brett Whiteley, 53, Australian artist, drug overdose.

=== 16 ===
- Jacob Beser, 71, United States Army Air Forces officer.
- Siro Bianchi, 67, Italian-French cyclist.
- W. L. Mooty, 86, American lawyer and politician.
- Peter Legh, 4th Baron Newton, 77, British politician.

=== 17 ===
- Dewey Balfa, 65, American cajun musician.
- Frederick Exley, 63, American author (A Fan's Notes), stroke.
- Grace Towns Hamilton, 85, American politician.
- Jacob Levin, 88, American chess player.
- Wally Lock, 75, Australian rules footballer.
- Jim Nance, 49, American gridiron football player (Boston/New England Patriots, New York Jets), heart attack.
- John R. Platt, 74, American physicist and biophysicist.
- Ishrat Hussain Usmani, 75, Pakistani atomic physicist.
- Bev Wallace, 69, American football player (San Francisco 49ers).

=== 18 ===
- Peter Allen, 48, Australian singer-songwriter, AIDS.
- Mordecai Ardon, 95, Hungarian-Israeli painter.
- Johnny Friedlaender, 79, German/French 20th-century artist.
- Benjamin Guinness, 3rd Earl of Iveagh, 55, Irish businessman and politician, cancer.
- Janusz Kruk, 45, Polish singer, guitarist and composer, heart failure.
- Ken McAuley, 71, Canadian ice hockey player (New York Rangers).
- Carlos Humberto Perette, 76, Argentine Radical Civic Union politician and lawyer.
- R. G. Samaranayake, 68, Sri Lankan politician.

=== 19 ===
- Jas H. Duke, 53, Australian poet and cult figure.
- Kathleen McKane Godfree, 96, English tennis player, Olympic champion (1920, 1924).
- Margherita Guidacci, 71, Italian poet, stroke.
- Mick Hughson, 76, Australian rules footballer.
- Herb Jones, 76, Australian rules footballer.
- Bruno Riem, 68, Swiss Olympic modern pentathlete (1948).
- Stephan Waser, 72, Swiss bobsledder and Olympic medalist (1952).

=== 20 ===
- Klaus Gerbig, 53, German Olympic hurdler (1960).
- Georges Gratiant, 85, Martiniquais communist politician.
- Charles Groves, 77, English conductor.
- Nikolai Sidelnikov, 62, Russian composer.
- Thomas Whitfield, 38, American musician, heart attack.

=== 21 ===
- Leonid Azgaldyan, 49, Armenian physicist and military leader, killed in action.
- Harry Eagle, 87, American physician and pathologist.
- Bill Milroy, 62, Australian rules footballer.
- Joan Fuster Ortells, 69, Spanish writer.
- Lajos Sántha, 76, Hungarian Olympic gymnast (1948, 1952).
- Yoshiko Uchida, 70, Japanese-American writer.
- Li Xiannian, 82, Chinese politician, president (1983–1988).
- Franz Wasner, 86, Austrian Roman Catholic priest and missionary, director of the Trapp Family.

=== 22 ===
- Rufus Baker, 73, American baseball player.
- Hansjörg Eichler, 76, German botanist.
- M. F. K. Fisher, 83, American cookbook author.
- Constantin Virgil Gheorghiu, 75, Romanian-French novelist.
- Reg Harris, 72, British cyclist and Olympian (1948), stroke.
- Gemini Kantha, 67, Sri Lankan actress.
- Franco Leccese, 67 Italian sprinter and Olympian (1952).
- Arthur C. Lundahl, 77, American aerial reconnaissance pioneer.
- Ng Ming-yam, 37, Hong Kong politician and writer, leukemia.
- Chuck Mitchell, 64, American actor (Porky's), cirrhosis.
- Charlie Ondras, 25, American noise rock drummer, drug overdose.
- Emanuel David Rudolph, 64, American botanist.
- István Szívós Sr., 71, Hungarian water polo player, coach and Olympian (1948, 1952, 1956).

=== 23 ===
- Eric Andolsek, 25, American gridiron football player (Detroit Lions), traffic accident.
- Cash Fitzgerald, 71, Australian rules footballer.
- Margot Bernice Forde, 57, New Zealand botanist, curator, and taxonomist.
- Lucile Saunders McDonald, 93, American journalist, historian, and children's author.
- Joy Nichols, 67, Australian-British comedian, actress and singer.
- Juris Podnieks, 41, Latvian filmmaker, drowned.
- John Spencer Churchill, 83, English artist.
- Viktor Yanushevsky, 32, Soviet and Belarusian football player, heart attack.

=== 24 ===
- Jorge Salas Chávez, 77, Argentinian Olympic sailor (1948, 1956, 1960, 1964, 1972).
- Vern Curtis, 72, American baseball player (Washington Senators).
- Len Darling, 82, Australian cricketer.
- Jean Delarge, 99, Belgian Olympic middle-distance runner (1920).
- Victor Lemberechts, 68, Belgian footballer.
- Maharajapuram Santhanam, 64, Indian singer, traffic collision.
- Jo Spence, 58, British photographer, writer, and photo therapist, breast cancer.
- Rudolf Svedberg, 81, Swedish Olympic wrestler (1936).
- Dean White, 69, American basketball player.

=== 25 ===
- Jerome Brown, 27, American football player (Philadelphia Eagles), traffic collision.
- Larry Cahan, 58, Canadian ice hockey player.
- Sayavush Hasanov, 28, Azerbaijan soldier and war hero, killed in action.
- Herbert J. McGlinchey, 87, American politician, member of the United States House of Representatives (1945-1947).
- Don Newmeyer, 90, American football player.
- James Stirling, 66, British architect, complications from surgery.

=== 26 ===
- John Jacob Astor VI, 79, American shipping magnate and socialite.
- Jacob Butula, 61, Canadian Olympic boxer (1952).
- Flávio de Melo, 27, Brazilian Olympic rower (1988).
- Gyula Polgár, 80, Hungarian football player.
- Buddy Rogers, 71, American professional wrestler, stroke.
- Phil Rubenstein, 51, American actor (Tango & Cash, RoboCop 2, Elvira: Mistress of the Dark), heart failure.
- Harald Sverdrup, 69, Norwegian poet and children's writer.

=== 27 ===
- Sandy Amorós, 62, Cuban-American baseball player (Brooklyn/Los Angeles Dodgers, Detroit Tigers), pneumonia.
- Bob Harvey, 74, American baseball player.
- Frank Jelincich, 74, American baseball player (Chicago Cubs).
- Allan Jones, 84, American actor and singer, lung cancer.
- Martin F. Rockmore, 74, American marine general.
- Stefanie Sargent, 24, American musician (7 Year Bitch), accidental asphyxiation.
- Charles Tyler, 50, American jazz musician, heart failure.
- Elizabeth (Bessie) Watson, 91, Scottish child suffragette and piper.
- Georg Årlin, 75, Swedish actor.

=== 28 ===
- Roger Bisseron, 86, French racing cyclist.
- Peter Hirt, 82, Swiss racing driver.
- Valerian Kobakhia, 63, Soviet-Abkhaz apparatchik.
- Joan Marshall, 61, American actress (Bold Venture, Shampoo, Star Trek).
- John Piper, 88, English artist.
- Howard Roberts, 62, American jazz guitarist and session musician.
- Qian Sanqiang, 78, Chinese nuclear physicist.
- Mikhail Tal, 55, Latvian chess player, esophageal hemorrhage.

=== 29 ===
- Pierre Billotte, 86, French soldier and war hero during World War II.
- Mohamed Boudiaf, 73, Algerian politician, chairman of the High Council of State (since 1992), assassinated.
- May Farquharson, 98, Jamaican social worker, birth control advocate, philanthropist and reformer.
- Elie Kedourie, 66, British historian.
- Kamil Nəsibov, 45, Azerbaijani soldier and war hero, killed in action.
- Mario Rossi, 90, Italian conductor.
- Daniel Strickler, 95, United States Army general and politician.

=== 30 ===
- Henry Thynne, 6th Marquess of Bath, 87, British aristocrat and politician.
- André Hébuterne, 97, French painter.
- Käthe Itter, 85, German actress.
- Massey Lopes, 2nd Baron Roborough, 88, British peer and British Army officer.
- Jan van Heteren, 75, Dutch Olympic water polo player (1936).
