= 1992 in baseball =

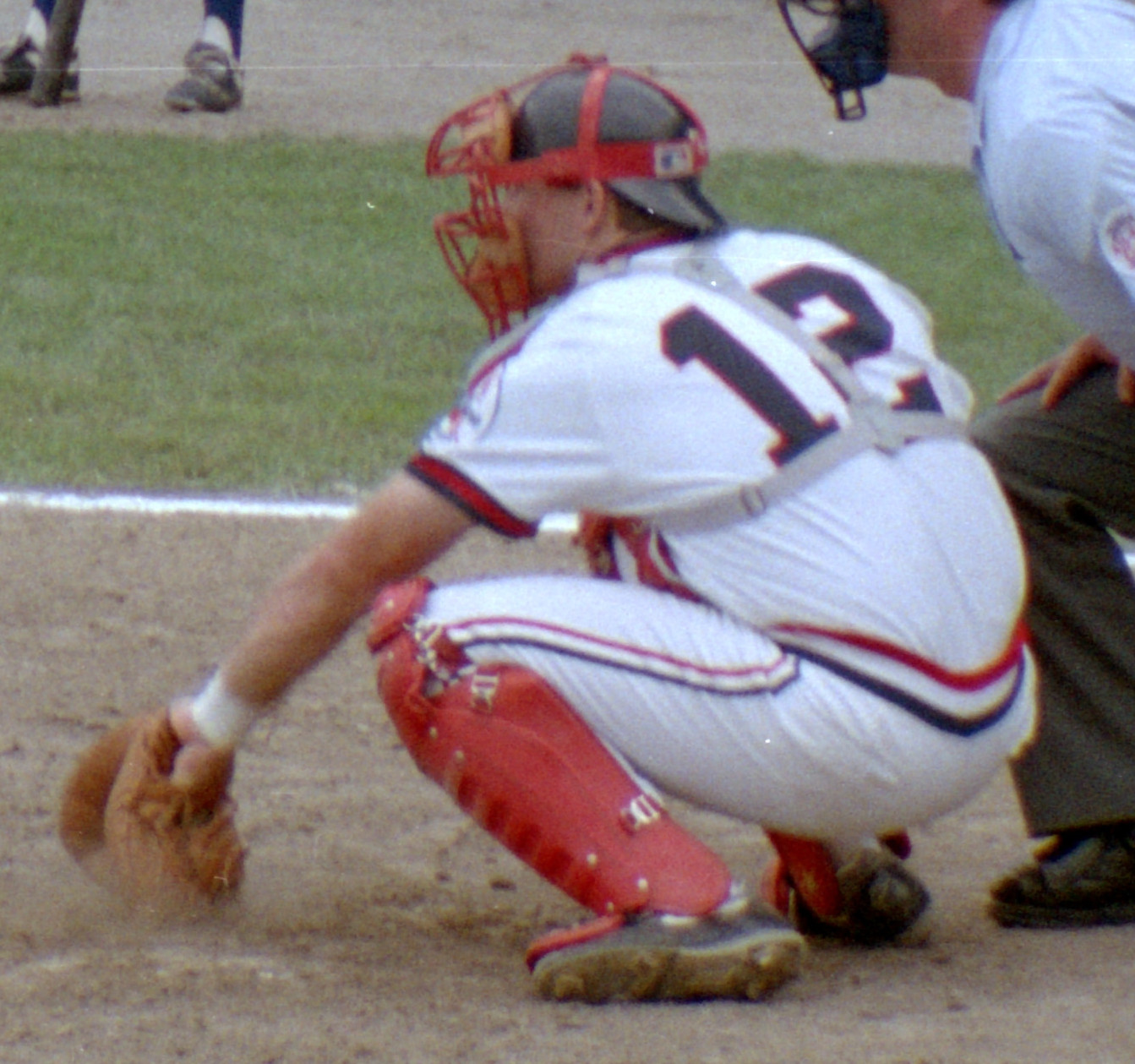
Rich Rowland catching for the Toledo Mud Hens during a game in Toledo, Ohio in June 1992

The following are the baseball events of the year 1992 throughout the world.

== Champions ==
=== Major League Baseball ===
- World Series: Toronto Blue Jays over Atlanta Braves (4-2); Pat Borders, MVP

League Championship Series (ALCS, NLCS)
East	Toronto	4
West	Oakland	2
East	Pittsburgh	3
West	Atlanta	4

World Series
AL	Toronto	4
NL	Atlanta	2

- American League Championship Series MVP: Roberto Alomar
- National League Championship Series MVP: John Smoltz
- All-Star Game, July 14 at Jack Murphy Stadium: American League, 13–6; Ken Griffey Jr., MVP

=== Other champions ===
- Caribbean World Series: Indios de Mayagüez (Puerto Rico)
- College World Series: Pepperdine
- Japan Series: Seibu Lions over Yakult Swallows (4-3)
- Korean Series: Lotte Giants over Binggrae Eagles
- Big League World Series: Broward County, Florida
- Junior League World Series: Tucson, Arizona
- Little League World Series: Long Beach, California; title awarded following loss to team from Zamboanga City, Mindanao, Philippines, which was later disqualified
- Senior League World Series: Pingtung, Taiwan
- Summer Olympic Games at Barcelona, Spain: Cuba (Gold), Chinese Taipei (Silver), Japan (Bronze)
- Taiwan Series: Brother Elephants

== Awards and honors ==
- Baseball Hall of Fame
  - Rollie Fingers
  - Bill McGowan
  - Hal Newhouser
  - Tom Seaver
- Most Valuable Player
  - Dennis Eckersley, Oakland Athletics (AL)
  - Barry Bonds, Pittsburgh Pirates (NL)
- Cy Young Award
  - Dennis Eckersley, Oakland Athletics (AL)
  - Greg Maddux, Chicago Cubs (NL)
- Rookie of the Year
  - Pat Listach, Milwaukee Brewers (AL)
  - Eric Karros, Los Angeles Dodgers (NL)
- Rolaids Relief Man of the Year Award
  - Dennis Eckersley, Oakland Athletics (AL)
  - Lee Smith, St. Louis Cardinals (NL)
- Manager of the Year
  - Tony La Russa, Oakland Athletics (AL)
  - Jim Leyland, Pittsburgh Pirates (NL)
- Woman Executive of the Year (major or minor league): Tammy Felker-White, Portland Beavers, Pacific Coast League
- Gold Glove Award
  - Don Mattingly (1B) (AL)
  - Roberto Alomar (2B) (AL)
  - Robin Ventura (3B) (AL)
  - Cal Ripken Jr. (SS) (AL)
  - Ken Griffey Jr. (OF) (AL)
  - Kirby Puckett (OF) (AL)
  - Devon White (OF) (AL)
  - Iván Rodríguez (C) (AL)
  - Mark Langston (P) (AL)
  - Mark Grace (1B) (NL)
  - José Lind (2B) (NL)
  - Terry Pendleton (3B) (NL)
  - Ozzie Smith (SS) (NL)
  - Barry Bonds (OF) (NL)
  - Andy Van Slyke (OF) (NL)
  - Larry Walker (OF) (NL)
  - Tom Pagnozzi (C) (NL)
  - Greg Maddux (P) (NL)

== MLB statistical leaders ==
	American League		National League
Type	Name	Stat	Name	Stat
AVG	Edgar Martínez SEA	.343	Gary Sheffield SD	.330
HR	Juan González TEX	43	Fred McGriff SD	35
RBI	Cecil Fielder DET	124	Darren Daulton PHI	109
Wins	Kevin Brown TEX; Jack Morris TOR	21	Tom Glavine ATL; Greg Maddux CHC	20
ERA	Roger Clemens BOS	2.41	Bill Swift SF	2.08

== Major League Baseball final standings ==
American League
Rank	Club	Wins	Losses	Win %	GB
East Division
1st	Toronto Blue Jays	96	66	.593	--
2nd	Milwaukee Brewers	92	70	.568	4.0
3rd	Baltimore Orioles	89	73	.549	7.0
4th	Cleveland Indians	76	86	.469	20.0
4th	New York Yankees	76	86	.469	20.0
6th	Detroit Tigers	75	87	.463	21.0
7th	Boston Red Sox	73	89	.451	23.0
West Division
1st	Oakland Athletics	96	66	.593	--
2nd	Minnesota Twins	90	72	.556	6.0
3rd	Chicago White Sox	86	76	.531	10.0
4th	Texas Rangers	77	85	.475	19.0
5th	California Angels	72	90	.444	24.0
5th	Kansas City Royals	72	90	.444	24.0
7th	Seattle Mariners	64	98	.395	32.0

National League
Rank	Club	Wins	Losses	Win %	GB
East Division
1st	Pittsburgh Pirates	96	66	.593	--
2nd	Montreal Expos	87	75	.537	9.0
3rd	St. Louis Cardinals	83	79	.512	13.0
4th	Chicago Cubs	78	84	.481	18.0
5th	New York Mets	72	90	.444	24.0
6th	Philadelphia Phillies	70	92	.432	26.0
West Division
1st	Atlanta Braves	98	64	.605	--
2nd	Cincinnati Reds	90	72	.556	8.0
3rd	San Diego Padres	82	80	.506	16.0
4th	Houston Astros	81	81	.500	17.0
5th	San Francisco Giants	72	90	.444	26.0
6th	Los Angeles Dodgers	63	99	.389	35.0

== Managers ==
=== American League ===
Team	Manager	Comments
Baltimore Orioles	Johnny Oates	
Boston Red Sox	Butch Hobson	
California Angels	Buck Rodgers	after a May bus accident John Wathan was acting manager for the remainder of the season
Chicago White Sox	Gene Lamont	
Cleveland Indians	Mike Hargrove	
Detroit Tigers	Sparky Anderson	
Kansas City Royals	Hal McRae	
Milwaukee Brewers	Phil Garner	
Minnesota Twins	Tom Kelly	
New York Yankees	Buck Showalter	
Oakland Athletics	Tony La Russa	Won American League West
Seattle Mariners	Bill Plummer	
Texas Rangers	Bobby Valentine	was replaced during the season by Toby Harrah
Toronto Blue Jays	Cito Gaston	Won the World Series

=== National League ===
Team	Manager	Comments
Atlanta Braves	Bobby Cox	Won the National League pennant
Chicago Cubs	Jim Lefebvre	
Cincinnati Reds	Lou Piniella	
Houston Astros	Art Howe	
Los Angeles Dodgers	Tommy Lasorda	
Montreal Expos	Tom Runnells	was replaced during the season by Felipe Alou
New York Mets	Jeff Torborg	
Philadelphia Phillies	Jim Fregosi	
Pittsburgh Pirates	Jim Leyland	Won National League East
St. Louis Cardinals	Joe Torre	
San Diego Padres	Jim Riggleman	
San Francisco Giants	Roger Craig	

== Events ==
=== January ===
- January 2 – The Boston Red Sox sign free agent pitcher Frank Viola.
- January 6 - The New York Yankees signed outfielder Danny Tartabull as a free agent.
- January 7 – Pitchers Tom Seaver and Rollie Fingers are elected to the Baseball Hall of Fame by the Baseball Writers' Association of America. Seaver finishes with a record 98.8% of the votes cast. Pete Rose, ineligible because of his ban from baseball (otherwise this year does not become his first year of eligibility), receives 41 write–in votes.
- January 8 - The Atlanta Braves signed Steve Lyons as a free agent.
- January 10 - The Chicago White Sox acquired Second Baseman Steve Sax from the New York Yankees in exchange for pitchers Domingo Jean, Bob Wickman and Melido Perez
- January 17 - The Oakland Athletics signed pitcher Ron Darling as a free agent.
- January 21 - The New York Yankees signed free agent catcher Mike Stanley.
- January 22 - The California Angels signed pitcher Bert Blyleven as a free agent.
- January 27 – The Oakland Athletics sign free agent relief pitcher Goose Gossage
  - The Cleveland Indians signed free agent third baseman Brook Jacoby.
- January 31 – The Pittsburgh Pirates sign outfielder Barry Bonds to a one-year contract worth $4.7 million, the largest-ever one-year deal.

=== February ===
- February 2 – The California Angels signed infielder Ken Oberkfell as a free agent.
- February 12 – The Montreal Expos signed catcher Rick Cerone as a free agent.
- February 19 – The Boyfriend episode of Seinfeld debuts on NBC, featuring very special guest star Keith Hernandez.
- February 20 – The Simpsons episode, Homer at the Bat airs featuring guest appearances by Roger Clemens, Wade Boggs, Ken Griffey Jr., Steve Sax, Ozzie Smith, José Canseco, Don Mattingly, Darryl Strawberry and Mike Scioscia.
- February 23 – The Milwaukee Brewers signed infielder Scott Fletcher as a free agent.
- February 27 – One hundred forty-nine players file for salary arbitration. Of the 21 who have a hearing, the players win ten and lose eleven. New York Mets pitcher David Cone receives a record $4.25 million award.

=== March ===
- March 2 – Chicago Cubs second baseman Ryne Sandberg becomes the highest-paid player in major league history when he agrees to a four-year contract extension worth $28.4 million.
- March 9 – Outfielder John Moses returns to Seattle by signing a free agent contract with the Mariners.
- March 10 – The Kansas City Royals trade outfielder Kirk Gibson to the Pittsburgh Pirates in exchange for pitcher Neal Heaton.
- March 15 – Dwight Evans is released by the Baltimore Orioles, ending his 20-year career.
- March 17:
  - The Minnesota Twins trade highly regarded prospect pitcher Denny Neagle to the Pittsburgh Pirates for pitcher John Smiley.
  - Pitcher Hal Newhouser and umpire Bill McGowan are elected to the Baseball Hall of Fame by the Veterans Committee.
- March 20 – The Detroit Tigers signed free agent pitcher Fernando Valenzuela.
- March 26 – The Milwaukee Brewers trade Gary Sheffield and minor league pitcher Geoff Kellogg to the San Diego Padres in exchange for pitcher Ricky Bones, infielder John Valentin and minor league prospect Matt Mieske
- March 28 – The Texas Rangers signed Steve Balboni as a free agent.
- March 30 – In one of the biggest cross-town trades in Chicago baseball history, the Chicago Cubs trade George Bell to the Chicago White Sox, while the Sox send Sammy Sosa to the Cubs.

=== April ===
- April 1 – Mike Heath is released by the Atlanta Braves.
- April 2 – In what would turn out to be a one sided trade, the Philadelphia Phillies acquire Curt Schilling from the Houston Astros for relief pitcher Jason Grimsley. Schilling plays a role in the Phillies World Series run, whereas Grimsley never appears in a single game for the Astros.
- April 5 – Less than a month after he is released by the Kansas City Royals, Kevin Seitzer signs a free agent contract with the Milwaukee Brewers.
  - The Texas Rangers sign a pair of free agents. Pitcher Floyd Bannister and catcher John Russell.
- April 6:
  - A crowd of 44,568 sees the Baltimore Orioles defeat the Cleveland Indians 2–0 in the first game at Oriole Park at Camden Yards. Rick Sutcliffe hurls the shutout for Baltimore.
  - The Texas Rangers overcome an 8–3 deficit to defeat the Seattle Mariners 12–10. The Rangers score nine runs in the eighth inning as a stunned Kingdome crowd watched on.
- April 10 – Dave Eiland makes it into the record books in an unusual way. He hits a home run in his first at bat, thus becoming the first pitcher who gave up a home run to the first batter he ever faced (Paul Molitor) and hit a home run in his very own first plate appearance. Eiland gave up the homer to Molitor as a member of the New York Yankees in 1988.
- April 28 - The Cincinnati Reds sign catcher Scott Bradley a free agent.

=== May ===
- May 4 - The Chunichi Dragons of the Japan Central League purchase the contract of outfielder Alonzo Powell from the Seattle Mariners.
- May 5 – The Pittsburgh Pirates release Kirk Gibson.
- May 8 – Butch Henry, a pitcher for the Houston Astros, hits an inside the park home run for his first career hit. He connects off Pirates pitcher Doug Drabek and Pirates outfielder Barry Bonds fails to field the ball. It would be the only home run of Henry's career.
- May 9 – At Busch Stadium, the St. Louis Cardinals come back from deficits of 9-0 and 11–3 to win 12–11 over the Atlanta Braves.
- May 21 – The California Angels team bus is involved in a crash on the New Jersey Turnpike. Eleven people are injured, the most serious being Buck Rodgers, the Angels manager. He would miss the next 90 games of the season.
- May 22 – The Montreal Expos fire manager Tom Runnels and name Felipe Alou as the team's new manager.
- May 27 – The Atlanta Braves, at the time in last place, defeat the Philadelphia Phillies 9–3. The upset win sparks the Braves, who go on a 78–37 run and win the NL West.
- May 30 – Scott Sanderson of the New York Yankees gets the W in the Yankees 8–1 win over the Milwaukee Brewers. The victory allows Sanderson to become the ninth pitcher to have defeated all (at the time) 26 teams in the major leagues. Nolan Ryan, Tommy John, Don Sutton, Mike Torrez, Rick Wise, Gaylord Perry, Doyle Alexander, and Goose Gossage were the others to accomplish the feat.

=== June ===
- June 1 – The MLB draft is held. Phil Nevin, Paul Shuey, B.J. Wallace, Jeffrey Hammonds, and Chad Mottola all go off the board before the New York Yankees select shortstop Derek Jeter.
- June 3 – The Detroit Tigers sell the contracts of pitcher Fernando Valenzuela and infielder Rick Renteria to Jalisco of the Mexican League.
- June 5 – Eddie Murray of the New York Mets drives in two runs in a game against the Pittsburgh Pirates. This allows Murray to tie Mickey Mantle as the all-time RBI leader among switch hitters. Murray would break the record the following day.
- June 8 – Steve Howe of the New York Yankees is banned from baseball for life by Commissioner Fay Vincent. Howe was arrested earlier in the year for striking a light pole with his vehicle and leaving the scene of an accident. The trial was postponed to May, and Howe took a plea deal on a charge of attempted drug possession.
- June 9 - The New York Yankees and New York Mets exchange pitchers, as the Mets send Tim Burke to the Yankees in exchange for Lee Guetterman.
- June 10 – Mark McGwire of the Oakland Athletics hits the 200th home run of his career, connecting off Chris Bosio of the Milwaukee Brewers.
- June 11 – The Pittsburgh Pirates release pitcher Dennis Lamp.
- June 16 – The California Angels retire Nolan Ryan's number in a pregame ceremony.
- June 20 – Kelly Saunders fills in for Rex Barney, the Public Address announcer for the Baltimore Orioles. This makes Saunders the second woman to fill that role, joining Joy Hawkins McCabe, who filled in for one game for the Washington Senators in 1966.

=== July ===
- July 6–8 – The Montreal Expos and Los Angeles Dodgers play a series of three doubleheaders at Dodger Stadium. The Dodgers sweep the first doubleheader, the Expos sweep the second, and the two teams split the third. The doubleheaders are part of a series that had been postponed because of the Los Angeles Riots.
- July 7 – Andy Van Slyke of the Pittsburgh Pirates becomes the first outfielder in nearly 18 years to record an unassisted double play, in the Pirates' 5–3 win over the Houston Astros. Van Slyke races in from center field to catch a fly ball, then continues in to double up Ken Caminiti, who was running from second base on the play.
- July 12 – Jeff Blauser of the Atlanta Braves hits three home runs in the Braves 7–3 win over the Chicago Cubs. Blauser joins Barry Larkin, Ernie Banks and Freddie Patek as the only shortstops in MLB history to hit three home runs in one game.
- July 14 – The American League pounds out a record 19 hits in defeating the National League by a score of 13–6 in the All-Star Game. It is the AL's fifth straight win. Seattle Mariners outfielder Ken Griffey Jr., who hit a single, a double and a home run, is named the MVP, 12 years after his father Ken Sr. won the same honor.
- July 15 – One day after signing free agent catcher Jerry Willard, who'd been released by the Atlanta Braves, the Montreal Expos release catcher Rick Cerone.
- July 17 – Three years removed from hitting 30 home runs for the Boston Red Sox, Nick Esasky is released by the Atlanta Braves, Esasky was suffering from vertigo, which essentially ended his career.
- July 24 – Scott Erickson throws the Minnesota Twins' only complete-game one-hitter. Former Twin Tom Brunansky has the only hit for the Boston Red Sox.
- July 26 – In a 6–2 win over the Baltimore Orioles, Nolan Ryan of the Texas Rangers gets his 319th win all-time, passing Phil Niekro to move into 12th on the all-time list. In the same game, Ryan recorded his 100th strike out of the season, setting a new MLB record of 23 straight seasons with 100 or more strike outs.
- July 30 – Juan Samuel's tenure with the Los Angeles Dodgers comes to an end. Samuel, who'd been acquired as part of a much ballyhooed trade, fails to live up to expectations.

=== August ===
- August 1 – As was the case last season, Deion Sanders leaves the Atlanta Braves to report for Atlanta Falcons training camp. However, he was able to rework his NFL contract and reported back to the Braves for the postseason.
- August 8 - The Milwaukee Brewers officially retire the number 34 in honor of pitcher Rollie Fingers.
- August 17 – At Dodger Stadium, Kevin Gross of the Los Angeles Dodgers no-hits the San Francisco Giants 2–0.
- August 21 - The California Angels released outfielder Von Hayes.
- August 28 – The Milwaukee Brewers lash 31 hits in a 22-2 drubbing of the Toronto Blue Jays, setting a record for the most hits by a team in a single nine-inning game. Darryl Hamilton leads the way for the Brewers, going 4-for-7 with 5 RBI.
- August 31 – The Oakland Athletics trade José Canseco to the Texas Rangers in the middle of a game and while Canseco was in the on-deck circle, for Rubén Sierra, Jeff Russell and Bobby Witt.

=== September ===
- September 7 – After receiving an 18–9 no-confidence vote from the owners, Commissioner Fay Vincent resigns under pressure. Vincent is soon replaced by Milwaukee Brewers president Bud Selig on what is meant to be an interim basis. The commissioner's power transfers to baseball's Executive Council, made up of the two league presidents and eight owners, with Selig as the chair. Besides, Jerry Reinsdorf, Chicago White Sox chairman explains: "When we go to war with the union, I want [the commissioner] to have an obligation only to the owners."
- September 9 – Robin Yount becomes the 17th big leaguer to reach 3,000 hits in the Milwaukee Brewers' 5–4 loss to the Cleveland Indians. Yount singles to right center off Cleveland's José Mesa in the seventh inning.
- September 20 – Mickey Morandini of the Philadelphia Phillies completes the first National League unassisted triple play in 65 years. It is the ninth in Major League history, but only the second to be pulled off by a second baseman. The Pittsburgh Pirates win the game, however, 3–2.
- September 23 – Bip Roberts of the Cincinnati Reds hits safely in his tenth consecutive at-bat. He ends his streak later in the game against the Los Angeles Dodgers.
- September 26 - Bill Pecota becomes the first position player in New York Mets history to appear as a pitcher. After appearing as a pinch hitter in the 8th inning, Pecota takes the mound in the ninth, and surrenders just one hit, a home run to Andy Van Slyke in the Mets 19-2 loss to the Pittsburgh Pirates.
- September 27 – The Pittsburgh Pirates seal their third consecutive National League East championship with a 4–2 victory over the New York Mets. It is the Pirates' final postseason berth before their 2013 season.
- September 28 – The idle Oakland Athletics clinch their fourth American League West crown in five years when the second-place Minnesota Twins fall to the Chicago White Sox 9–4.
- September 29 – The Atlanta Braves wrap up the National League West with a 6–0 shutout of the San Francisco Giants.
- September 30 – George Brett of the Kansas City Royals collects his 3,000th hit, an infield single off Tim Fortugno in the seventh inning of a 4–0 Royals victory over the California Angels.

=== October ===
- October 3 – The Toronto Blue Jays clinch their second straight American League East title with a narrow 3–2 win over the Detroit Tigers.
- October 11 - Two-sport Deion Sanders plays for the Atlanta Falcons in their game with the Miami Dolphins and flies immediately afterwards to Pittsburgh to play in the Atlanta Braves' playoff Game 5 against the Pittsburgh Pirates in an attempt to become the first professional athlete to play in games for two separate sports in the same day. However, Sanders does not play in the game for the Braves.
- October 14 - The Atlanta Braves defeat the Pittsburgh Pirates 3-2 in Game 7 of the 1992 National League Championship Series to clinch their second straight National League pennant. After the game, the Braves' Deion Sanders throws a bucket of ice on CBS baseball analyst Tim McCarver as he is conducting postgame interviews in the Braves' locker room allegedly over comments made by McCarver throughout the series over Sanders' commitment to the Braves alongside his commitment to the NFL's Atlanta Falcons.
- October 23 – The expansion Florida Marlins hire Rene Lachemann as the team's first manager.
- October 24 – The Toronto Blue Jays clinch their first World Series championship with a 4–3 win over the Atlanta Braves in Game 6. Dave Winfield's 2–out, 2–run double in the top of the 11th gives Toronto a 4–2 lead. The Braves score one run in the bottom half of the inning and have the tying run on the 3rd when the final out is made. Jimmy Key wins the game in relief, and Candy Maldonado homers for Toronto. Blue Jays catcher Pat Borders, with a .450 batting average, is named the Series MVP. The Toronto Blue Jays finish the season without being swept in any series. It is the first team from outside the United States to win the World Series.
- October 27 – The expansion Colorado Rockies hire Don Baylor as the team's first manager.

=== November ===
- November 10 – The National League fails to approve the sale of the San Francisco Giants to Vince Naimoli, blocking a move to St. Petersburg, Florida. The 9–4 vote falls short of the 10 required for approval.
- November 12 – Arbitrator George Nicolau overturns the lifetime ban of New York Yankees pitcher Steve Howe for substance abuse, considering it too severe. After that, Howe is re-signed by the team.
- November 16 – The Colorado Rockies sign free agent first baseman Andrés Galarraga, who rejoins Don Baylor, his hitting coach with the St. Louis Cardinals. Galarraga is coming off his second injury-plagued year, having missed 44 days of the season after being hit on the wrist by a Wally Whitehurst pitch in the third game of the season.
- November 17 – Major League Baseball holds an expansion draft to stock the rosters of the National League's two new teams, the Florida Marlins and Colorado Rockies. A total of 72 players are chosen. The best picks for Florida are Trevor Hoffman, eventually packaged for Gary Sheffield; Jeff Conine, and Cris Carpenter, later dealt to the Texas Rangers for Robb Nen. For Colorado, their best picks are Eric Young, Joe Girardi, Vinny Castilla, Armando Reynoso, Andy Ashby, Brad Ausmus, Charlie Hayes and Doug Bochtler. The next season, Ashby, Ausmus and Bochtler will go to the San Diego Padres in an ill-fated deal for pricey veteran pitchers Bruce Hurst and Greg Harris.
- November 22 – Milwaukee Brewers shortstop Pat Listach is named American League Rookie of the Year. Listach, who was recalled on April 7 to replace the injured Bill Spiers, hit a .290 average and also became the first Brewers player to steal 50 bases in a season.
- November 29 – Cincinnati Reds owner Marge Schott is quoted in The New York Times as saying that Adolf Hitler was initially good for Germany, that her references to "niggers" were in jest, and she couldn't understand why the word "Jap" was offensive. MLB appoints a four-man committee to investigate the controversial Schott.

=== December ===
- December 1 – During the Major League Baseball Players Association annual executive board meeting, its executive director Donald Fehr tells the membership that the union needs "to save the owners from themselves."
- December 4 - The New York Yankees sign free agent shortstop Spike Owen and the Minnesota Twins re-sign outfielder Kirby Puckett.
- December 6 - The New York Yankees acquire pitcher Jim Abbott from the California Angels in exchange for pitchers Jerry Nielsen, Russ Springer and first baseman J.T. Snow.
- December 7 – At the winter meetings in Louisville, the MLB owners vote 15–13 to reopen the Collective Bargaining Agreement (CBA) one year early, as they have the right to do. Two days later, MLBPA director Donald Fehr calls a 1993 lockout a "foregone conclusion".
- December 8 - The San Francisco Giants sign free agent Barry Bonds.
- December 10 - The New York Yankees sign free agent pitcher Jimmy Key.
- December 11 - The Baltimore Orioles release second baseman Bill Ripken and replace him with free agent Harold Reynolds.
- December 14 - The Baltimore Orioles continue to add free agents, signing pitcher Jamie Moyer and third baseman Scott Coolbaugh.
- December 15 - Notable free agent signings for the day include Bill Bean signing with the San Diego Padres, and Wade Boggs leaving the Boston Red Sox and signing with their rival, the New York Yankees.
- December 17 - The Minnesota Twins sign Dave Winfield as a free agent.

== Movies ==
- The Babe
- Comrades of Summer, The (TV)
- It's Spring Training, Charlie Brown (TV)
- League of Their Own, A
- Mr. Baseball

== Births ==
=== January ===
- January 3 – Sam Moll
- January 4 – Kris Bryant
- January 4 – Michael Lorenzen
- January 5 – A. J. Cole
- January 8 – Breyvic Valera
- January 9 – Joe Harvey
- January 9 – Joseph Odom
- January 10 – Ryon Healy
- January 11 – Stevie Wilkerson
- January 15 – Brennan Bernardino
- January 15 – Chi Chi Gonzalez
- January 15 – Tim Mayza
- January 16 – Daniel Ponce de Leon
- January 18 – Jaycob Brugman
- January 19 – Jharel Cotton
- January 23 – Jacob May
- January 26 – Kyle Garlick
- January 28 – Hunter Renfroe
- January 29 – Brandon Dixon
- January 31 – Alex Claudio

=== February ===
- February 1 – Sean Manaea
- February 3 – Orlando Calixte
- February 5 – Kaleb Ort
- February 10 – Omar Narváez
- February 12 – Jordan Patterson
- February 12 – Jerry Vasto
- February 16 – Jeff Brigham
- February 16 – Marco Gonzales
- February 17 – Esteban Quiroz
- February 18 – Andrew Campbell
- February 20 – Johnny Field
- February 21 – Ryan Merritt
- February 21 – Ian Miller
- February 22 – Dixon Machado
- February 22 – Kevin McCarthy
- February 22 – Braden Shipley
- February 25 – Jorge Soler
- February 28 – Niko Goodrum
- February 29 – Gerardo Concepción
- February 29 – Stefan Crichton

=== March ===
- March 2 – Ariel Hernández
- March 3 – Harrison Musgrave
- March 4 – Nick Castellanos
- March 5 – Ben Lively
- March 11 – Luke Barker
- March 16 – Reymin Guduan
- March 18 – Trey Mancini
- March 21 – Bobby Wahl
- March 21 – Jimmy Yacabonis
- March 26 – Ramón Flores
- March 26 – Rob Zastryzny
- March 27 – Montana DuRapau
- March 29 – Chad Pinder
- March 31 – Ryan Cordell

=== April ===
- April 2 – Wilmer Difo
- April 3 – Blake Swihart
- April 8 – Artie Lewicki
- April 8 – Jeff McNeil
- April 9 – Ryan McBroom
- April 15 – Henry Ramos
- April 17 – Ronny Rodríguez
- April 20 – Drew Robinson
- April 21 – Joc Pederson
- April 22 – Edwin Escobar
- April 24 – Rangel Ravelo
- April 25 – Luis Cessa
- April 25 – Trevor Williams
- April 25 – Wei-Chung Wang
- April 26 – Aaron Judge
- April 29 – Steven Brault

=== May ===
- May 2 – Yadiel Rivera
- May 3 – Amir Garrett
- May 4 – Cam Booser
- May 6 – Joey Meneses
- May 9 – Dillon Maples
- May 10 – JaCoby Jones
- May 11 – Glenn Sparkman
- May 12 – Jonathan Davis
- May 13 – Willson Contreras
- May 16 – Williams Jerez
- May 17 – Ben Gamel
- May 17 – Eric Jagielo
- May 17 – Brian O'Grady
- May 24 – Dan Slania
- May 24 – Andrew Toles
- May 26 – Aaron Blair
- May 29 – D. J. Snelten

=== June ===
- June 1 – Tayler Scott
- June 2 – Kaleb Cowart
- June 4 – Kent Emanuel
- June 5 – Dereck Rodríguez
- June 7 – Vincent Velasquez
- June 9 – Tony Wolters
- June 10 – Jay Flaa
- June 16 – Zack Weiss
- June 19 – Austin Brice
- June 19 – Oscar Taveras
- June 26 – Ryan Thompson
- June 26 – Austin Voth
- June 29 – Ryan Battaglia
- June 29 – Bubby Rossman
- June 29 – Yolmer Sánchez
- June 29 – Frank Schwindel

=== July ===
- July 1 – Aaron Sanchez
- July 4 – Zac Curtis
- July 4 – Mike Ford
- July 6 – Manny Machado
- July 8 – Mike Gerber
- July 11 – Johnny Barbato
- July 12 – Nicky Delmonico
- July 13 – Seth Brown
- July 13 – Alfredo González
- July 14 – Tim Locastro
- July 15 – Phillip Ervin
- July 16 – Tetsuto Yamada
- July 17 – Silvino Bracho
- July 18 – Dinelson Lamet
- July 19 – Jack Reinheimer
- July 20 – Tyrell Jenkins
- July 21 – Henry Owens
- July 23 – Ashton Goudeau
- July 26 – Paul Fry
- July 27 – Vicente Campos
- July 31 – José Fernández
- July 31 – Kyle McGrath

=== August ===
- August 2 – Dylan Moore
- August 3 – Bubba Starling
- August 4 – Domingo Germán
- August 5 – Domingo Santana
- August 6 – John Gant
- August 7 – José De León
- August 7 – Michael Pérez
- August 10 – Archie Bradley
- August 11 – Kohei Arihara
- August 13 – Taijuan Walker
- August 14 – Josh Bell
- August 15 – Yorman Rodríguez
- August 16 – Delino DeShields Jr.
- August 16 – Connor Joe
- August 18 – Austin Hedges
- August 21 – Brandon Drury
- August 25 – Chandler Shepherd
- August 26 – Maikel Franco
- August 26 – Trevor Gott
- August 27 – Spenser Watkins
- August 29 – Noah Syndergaard
- August 31 – Dillon Peters
- August 31 – Ricardo Rodríguez

=== September ===
- September 2 – Ronald Torreyes
- September 4 – Willy García
- September 4 – Aaron Slegers
- September 6 – Socrates Brito
- September 6 – Marco Hernández
- September 6 – Michael Kelly
- September 6 – Wes Parsons
- September 6 – Sung Chia-hao
- September 8 – Dan Altavilla
- September 9 – Pat Valaika
- September 10 – Phillip Evans
- September 10 – Chad Kuhl
- September 10 – Mitch Walding
- September 11 – Andrew Suarez
- September 12 – Andrew Faulkner
- September 12 – Matt Wisler
- September 17 – Zack Granite
- September 17 – José Ramírez
- September 18 – Justin Shafer
- September 18 – Spencer Turnbull
- September 19 – José Briceño
- September 19 – Juniel Querecuto
- September 20 – Jeffrey Springs
- September 22 – Sam Coonrod
- September 22 – Chris Ellis
- September 28 – Justin Anderson
- September 28 – Severino González
- September 29 – Jake Reed

=== October ===
- October 1 – Xander Bogaerts
- October 1 – Christian Lopes
- October 1 – Colin Moran
- October 1 – Cy Sneed
- October 2 – Yasuaki Yamasaki
- October 7 – Mookie Betts
- October 11 – Grayson Greiner
- October 12 – Jandel Gustave
- October 14 – Miguel Del Pozo
- October 15 – Cody Carroll
- October 15 – Teoscar Hernández
- October 16 – Bryce Harper
- October 16 – Rosell Herrera
- October 17 – Hanser Alberto
- October 19 – Samuel Tuivailala
- October 20 – Tyler Goeddel
- October 22 – Alen Hanson
- October 25 – Tyler Payne
- October 26 – Eric Skoglund
- October 26 – Dwight Smith
- October 29 – Colten Brewer
- October 30 – Osmer Morales

=== November ===
- November 5 – Takuya Kai
- November 6 – Alex Blandino
- November 7 – Jordan Weems
- November 9 – Greg Bird
- November 9 – Daniel Camarena
- November 9 – Rowan Wick
- November 12 – Ben Taylor
- November 13 – Daniel Gossett
- November 14 – Daniel Castro
- November 14 – Akeel Morris
- November 15 – Dylan Bundy
- November 15 – Trevor Story
- November 16 – Cheslor Cuthbert
- November 16 – Reggie McClain
- November 18 – Michael Reed
- November 20 – Shawn Morimando
- November 21 – Abel de los Santos
- November 21 – Jason Garcia
- November 22 – Jayson Aquino
- November 23 – Kyle Hart
- November 27 – Bradley Zimmer
- November 28 – Jose Trevino
- November 30 – Kyle Crick

=== December ===
- December 1 – Javier Báez
- December 1 – Taylor Guerrieri
- December 1 – Bobby Poyner
- December 2 – Gary Sánchez
- December 2 – Charlie Tilson
- December 4 – Raúl Alcántara
- December 4 – Jake Cave
- December 4 – Scott Heineman
- December 4 – Joe Musgrove
- December 4 – Blake Snell
- December 6 – Cam Gallagher
- December 10 – Carlos Rodon
- December 10 – Dillon Thomas
- December 11 – Dalton Pompey
- December 12 – Luis Castillo
- December 12 – José Osuna
- December 13 – Brandon Leibrandt
- December 13 – Austin Slater
- December 16 – Chris Garia
- December 16 – Jack López
- December 17 – Miguel Gómez
- December 17 – Daniel Vogelbach
- December 18 – Scott Barlow
- December 18 – Eric Haase
- December 19 – Edubray Ramos
- December 19 – Austen Williams
- December 20 – Joey Krehbiel
- December 20 – Shuta Tonosaki
- December 24 – A. J. Ladwig
- December 25 – Tanner Rainey
- December 27 – Jordan Montgomery
- December 28 – Carlos Estévez
- December 29 – Enderson Franco
- December 31 – Adam McCreery

== Deaths ==
=== January ===
- January 1 – Jean Lovell, 65, who set home runs all-time records for All-American Girls Professional Baseball League catchers both in career and regular season.
- January 1 – Buck Stanton, 85, outfielder for the 1931 St. Louis Browns.
- January 3 – George Meyer, 82, second baseman for the 1938 Chicago White Sox.
- January 11 – Orville Jorgens, 83, pitcher for the Philadelphia Phillies from 1935 to 1937.
- January 15 – Charlie Gassaway, 73, pitcher who spent three seasons with the Chicago Cubs (1944), Philadelphia Athletics (1945) and Cleveland Indians (1946).
- January 17 – Red Durrett, 70, outfielder for the 1944–1945 Brooklyn Dodgers.
- January 18 – Philomena Gianfrancisco, 68, outfielder who played from 1945 through 1948 in the All-American Girls Professional Baseball League.
- January 21 – Chuck Rowland, 92, backup catcher for the 1923 Philadelphia Athletics.
- January 30 – Ed Taylor, 90, third baseman and shortstop for the 1926 Boston Braves.
- January 30 – Coaker Triplett, 80, left fielder for the Chicago Cubs, St. Louis Cardinals and Philadelphia Phillies from 1938 to 1945, who later posted four .300 seasons with the Buffalo Bisons of the International League, including the 1950 batting title.

=== February ===
- February 8 – Fabian Gaffke, 78, outfielder for the Boston Red Sox and the Cleveland Indians between 1936 and 1942.
- February 8 – Wally Shannon, 59, middle infielder for the St Louis Cardinals from 1959 to 1960.
- February 10 – Arthur "Red" Patterson, 83, club president of the California Angels from 1975 to 1977 and a longtime public relations and promotions director for the New York Yankees and Brooklyn/Los Angeles Dodgers; began his career as a baseball writer for the New York Herald–Tribune.
- February 13 – Byron Humphrey, 80, pitcher for the 1938 Boston Red Sox.
- February 13 – Earl Rapp, 70, outfielder who played with the Detroit Tigers, Chicago White Sox, New York Giants, St. Louis Browns and Washington Senators in all or parts of three seasons spanning 1949–1952.
- February 24 – Betty McKenna, 60, All-American Girls Professional Baseball League infielder in three seasons from 1951 to 1953.
- February 26 – Jean R. Yawkey, 83, majority owner of the Boston Red Sox since 1976.

=== March ===
- March 2 – Eddie Locke, 69, pitcher/outfielder whose career included five years with three Negro American League teams (1943–1945), then, after integration of Organized Baseball, 13 years in the minor leagues, where he won twenty or more games four times (1953–1955, 1959).
- March 3 – George Giles, 82, first baseman who played for multiple Negro National League clubs, including the Homestead Grays, Pittsburgh Crawfords and St. Louis Stars, between 1927 and 1938; 1935 NNL All-Star; grandfather of Brian Giles.
- March 4 – Larry Rosenthal, 81, backup outfielder for the Chicago White Sox, Cleveland Indians, New York Yankees and Philadelphia Athletics in part of eight seasons spanning 1936–1945.
- March 8 – Sherman Edwards, 82, relief pitcher for the 1934 Cincinnati Reds.
- March 14 – Glenn Liebhardt, 81, pitcher for the Philadelphia Athletics and the St. Louis Browns in three seasons between 1930 and 1938.
- March 31 – Ken Silvestri, 75, backup catcher who played with three different teams between 1941 and 1951, most prominently for the World Champion 1941 Yankees and the 1950 ′′Whiz Kids′′ Phillies; later, a longtime coach and, briefly, interim manager of 1967 Atlanta Braves.

=== April ===
- April 2 – Dib Williams, 82, middle infielder for the Philadelphia Athletics and Boston Red Sox from 1930 through 1935, and a member of the 1931 Athletics American League champion team.
- April 12 – Betty Bays, 61, All-American Girls Professional Baseball League outfielder and catcher.
- April 13 – Steve Shemo, 77, backup infielder for the Boston Braves from 1944 to 1945.
- April 14 – Horacio Martínez, 79, stalwart Dominican shortstop of the New York Cubans (1935–1936, 1940–1947); five-time Negro National League All-Star.
- April 15 – Ralph Weigel, 70, catcher/outfielder who played in part of three seasons with the Cleveland Indians (1946), Chicago White Sox (1948) and Washington Senators (1949).
- April 20 – Pat Creeden, 85, second baseman and pinch hitter who played eight games for the 1931 Boston Red Sox.
- April 20 – Orval Grove, 72, All-Star pitcher who posted a 63–73 record and a 3.78 ERA for the Chicago White Sox from 1940 to 1949, while setting a team-record by winning his first nine decisions in 1943.
- April 23 – Deron Johnson, 53, first and third baseman who spent 16 seasons in the majors, while hitting .287 with 32 home runs and a National League-best 130 RBIs for the 1965 Cincinnati Reds, and also a member of the World Series champion Oakland Athletics in 1973.
- April 24 – Elio Chacón, 55, Venezuelan shortstop and second baseman who played in 228 games for the Cincinnati Reds (1960–1961) and New York Mets (1962) and led Mets in stolen bases in their inaugural season.
- April 25 – Bob Hazle, 61, right fielder for the Cincinnati Reds, Milwaukee Braves and Detroit Tigers in part of three seasons spanning 1955–1958; member of the 1957 World Series champion Braves.
- April 27 – Harlond Clift, 79, All-Star third baseman for the St. Louis Browns (1934–1942) and Washington Senators (1942–1945); the first man at his position to hit at least 30 home runs (34, in 1938), who also scored 100 runs seven times, set a record with 405 assists in 1937, and compiled a career-mark of 309 double plays which ranks him 23rd in the MLB all-time list.

=== May ===
- May 1 – Celerino Sánchez, 48, Mexican third baseman for the Yankees from 1972 to 1973, who won the 1966 Triple Crown in the Mexican League, also a member of the Mexican and Caribbean Baseball Halls of Fame.
- May 1 – Justin Stein, 80, backup infielder who played for the Philadelphia Phillies and the Cincinnati Reds during the 1938 season.
- May 2 – Cannonball Berry, 80, hard-throwing pitcher/outfielder who appeared in the Negro American League, independent baseball, and on barnstorming teams between 1937 and 1951.
- May 8 – Joyce Ricketts, 59, two-time All-Star outfielder in the All-American Girls Professional Baseball League.
- May 10 – Tom Seats, 81, pitcher for the Detroit Tigers (1940) and the Brooklyn Dodgers (1945).
- May 12 – Joe Burke, 68, front-office executive; general manager of the Texas Rangers (1972–1973) and Kansas City Royals (1974–1981); president of the Royals from 1981 until his death; named Executive of the Year by The Sporting News in 1976.
- May 16 – Preacher Henry, 81, diminutive – 5 ft 5 in (1.65 m) – pitcher who hurled for multiple Negro American League clubs over nine seasons spanning 1938 and 1948.
- May 25 – Otto Denning, 79, catcher who played from 1942 through 1943 for the Cleveland Indians, later a minor league manager.
- May 28 – Fumio Fujimura, 75, Hall of Fame Japanese Baseball League and NPB pitcher, infielder and manager for the Hanshin/Osaka Tigers.
- May 28 – Charley Schanz, 72, hard-throwing pitcher whose career extended for 17 seasons (1938–1954), including stints with the Philadelphia Phillies (1944–1947) and Boston Red Sox (1950).
- May 31 – Karl Schnell, 92, relief pitcher for the Cincinnati Reds in the 1922 and 1923 seasons.

=== June ===
- June 2 – Jess Brooks, 79, third baseman for the 1937 Kansas City Monarchs who led Negro American League hitters in two-base hits.
- June 4 – Carl Stotz, 82, founder of Little League Baseball in 1939 who left the organization in 1955 in a litigious leadership dispute, shortly after serving as a pallbearer at Cy Young's funeral.
- June 12 – Randy Moore, 85, right fielder for the Chicago White Sox (1927–28), Boston Braves (1930–35), Brooklyn Dodgers (1936–37) and St. Louis Cardinals (1937).
- June 13 – Len Rice, 73, backup catcher for the Cincinnati Reds (1944) and the Chicago Cubs (1945).
- June 15 – Eddie Lopat, 73, All-Star pitcher who combined with Allie Reynolds and Vic Raschi to form the heart of the New York Yankees rotation through five World Series championships from 1949 through 1953, while also leading the American League in both earned run average (2.42) and won-lost percentage (.800) in 1953; manager of the Kansas City Athletics from 1963 to June 10, 1964.
- June 16 – Rita Meyer, 65, shortstop and pitcher who played in the All-American Girls Professional Baseball League.
- June 22 – Rufus Baker, 73, shortstop/catcher/outfielder for the New York Black Yankees from 1943 to 1948.
- June 24 – Vern Curtis, 72, pitcher in parts of three seasons for the Washington Senators between 1943 and 1946.
- June 27 – Sandy Amorós, 62, Cuban left fielder for the Brooklyn Dodgers, best remembered for a spectacular catch in Game 7 of the 1955 World Series.
- June 27 – Bob Harvey, 74, outfielder who appeared in six seasons (1943–1948) for the Newark Eagles; led Negro National League in hitting (.430) in 1944 and selected an All-Star in 1948.
- June 27 – Frank Jelincich, 74, outfielder who played briefly for the Chicago Cubs in the 1941 season.
- June 27 – Woody Main, 70, pitcher for the Pittsburgh Pirates in parts of four seasons spanning 1948–1953.

=== July ===
- July 3 – George Staller, 76, backup outfielder for the 1943 Philadelphia Athletics, who later developed a distinguished career as a scout, also serving as first base coach on Earl Weaver's Baltimore Orioles staff from 1968 to 1975, while working on the Orioles' three consecutive American League championship teams (1969–1971) and the 1970 World Series champion.
- July 3 – Slim Vaughan, 82, right-hander who hurled in nine games for the Newark Dodgers of the Negro National League in 1934.
- July 10 – Walt Masters, 85, Canadian pitcher who played for the Washington Senators (1931), Philadelphia Phillies (1937) and Philadelphia Athletics (1939), and also an American football halfback and quarterback in the National Football League during three seasons between 1936 and 1944.
- July 14 – Willie Wynn, 74, catcher for three Negro leagues teams, principally the Newark Eagles, between 1944 and 1948.
- July 27 – Salty Parker, 80, backup infielder for the 1936 Detroit Tigers, who later posted a 20-year minor league managing record of 920–858 (.517), and also coached for the San Francisco Giants, Cleveland Indians, Los Angeles/California Angels, New York Mets and Houston Astros between 1958 and 1979, while serving brief stints as manager of the Mets (1967) and the Astros (1972).

=== August ===
- August 5 – Jim Marquis, 91, pitcher who played briefly for the New York Yankees during the 1925 season.
- August 5 – Lefty Wilkie, 77, Canadian pitcher who appeared in 68 games for the Pittsburgh Pirates from 1941 to 1942 and again in 1946.
- August 15 – Oran Frazier, 83, second baseman for the 1932 Montgomery Grey Sox of the Negro Southern League.
- August 22 – Flit Holliday, 78, outfielder for the 1938 Atlanta Black Crackers of the Negro American League.
- August 29 – Andy Gilbert, 78, outfielder for the Boston Red Sox in 1942 and 1946; successful minor league manager, posting a record of 2,055–1,959 (.512) with five league titles during 29 seasons spanning 1950–1982; coach for San Francisco Giants, 1972–1975.

=== September ===
- September 5 – Ron Davis, 50, outfielder who played from 1962 through 1969 for the Houston Colt .45s/Astros, St. Louis Cardinals and Pittsburgh Pirates, while collecting a .233 average with 10 home runs and 79 RBIs in 295 games.
- September 5 – Billy Herman, 83, Hall of Fame second baseman and a 10-time All-Star for the Chicago Cubs, Brooklyn Dodgers, Boston Braves and Pittsburgh Pirates between 1931 and 1947; batted .304 lifetime, scored 100 runs five times, and led the National League in hits, doubles and triples once each and in putouts seven times; manager of the Pirates in 1947 and the Boston Red Sox from October 3, 1964, through September 7, 1966; longtime coach.
- September 15 – Pedro Formental, 77, Cuban-born centerfielder whose career included stints in the Cuban Winter League, Mexican League, Negro American League (Memphis Red Sox, 1947), and Organized Baseball's minor leagues during the 1940s and 1950s.
- September 20 – Joe Fillmore, 78, pitcher for the Philadelphia Stars of the Negro National League (1941–1942, 1945–1946).
- September 22 – Aurelio López, 44, All-Star Mexican relief pitcher who posted a 62–36 record with a 3.56 ERA and 93 saves in 11 seasons for the Kansas City Royals, St. Louis Cardinals, Detroit Tigers and Houston Astros, which included two seasons of 21 saves for the Tigers from 1979 to 1980 and was also a member of the 1984 World Series champion Tigers.
- September 23 – Bernice Gera, 61, who became the first female umpire to officiate a professional baseball game, which took place on June 24, 1972, in the New York–Penn League in Geneva, New York.
- September 24 – Rufus Ligon, 89, southpaw pitcher and outfielder whose Negro leagues career included stints with the 1932 Little Rock Grays and 1944–1945 Memphis Red Sox.
- September 27 – Hal Smith, 90, middle-relief pitcher who posted a 12–11 record and a 3.77 ERA in 51 games for the Pittsburgh Pirates from 1932 to 1935.

=== October ===
- October 4 – Augie Prudhomme, 89, pitcher for the 1929 Detroit Tigers.
- October 9 – Mike Guerra, 79, Cuban catcher who played for the Washington Senators, Philadelphia Athletics and Boston Red Sox during 10 seasons spanning 1937–1951, and also a manager in the minors and the Mexican and Venezuelan winter leagues.
- October 10 – Willie Hutchinson, 71, pitcher/outfielder for the Kansas City Monarchs and Memphis Red Sox of the Negro American League between 1939 and 1946.
- October 15 – Jackie Sullivan, 74, second baseman who played in one game for the Detroit Tigers in 1944.
- October 17 – John O'Connell, 88, backup catcher for the Pittsburgh Pirates in 1928 and 1929.
- October 19 – Atley Donald, 82, New York Yankees pitcher who had a lifetime record of 65–33 for a winning percentage of .663; member of three (1939, 1941, 1943) World Series champions.
- October 20 – Spider Wilhelm, 63, shortstop for the 1953 Philadelphia Athletics.
- October 21 – Joe Dwyer, 89, pinch-hitter in 12 games for the 1937 Cincinnati Reds; outfielder who played in minor leagues for 21 seasons.
- October 22 – Red Barber, 84, broadcaster for the Cincinnati Reds, Brooklyn Dodgers and New York Yankees from 1934 to 1966 who, along with pal Mel Allen, earned the Ford Frick Award honors in its first class from the Baseball Hall of Fame and Museum.
- October 23 – Lou Rochelli, 73, second baseman in five games for the 1944 Brooklyn Dodgers; one of many ballplayers who only appeared in the major leagues during World War II.
- October 26 – Dottie Green, 71, catcher and chaperone, who participated in all 12 seasons of the All-American Girls Professional Baseball League.

=== November ===
- November 3 – Boze Berger, 82, infielder for the Cleveland Indians, Chicago White Sox and Boston Red Sox during six seasons between 1932 and 1939.
- November 3 – Chris Van Cuyk, 65, pitcher who played from 1950 through 1952 for the Brooklyn Dodgers.
- November 4 – Andy Varga, 61, pitcher for the Chicago Cubs during the 1950–1952 seasons.
- November 5 – Dick Hahn, 76, backup catcher for the 1940 Washington Senators.
- November 5 – Rod Scurry, 36, middle relief pitcher who posted a 19–32 record with a 3.24 ERA and 39 saves for three teams between 1980 and 1988, mostly with the Pittsburgh Pirates from 1980 to 1985.
- November 10 – Chuck Connors, 71, first baseman for the 1951 Chicago Cubs who gained stardom as an actor on the television series The Rifleman.
- November 13 – Johnny Ostrowski, 75, utility outfielder/third baseman who played for the Chicago Cubs, Boston Red Sox, Chicago White Sox and Washington Senators from 1943 to 1950.
- November 13 – Wally Shaner, 92, left fielder who played from 1923 to 1929 for the Cleveland Indians, Boston Red Sox and Cincinnati Reds.
- November 13 – Claude Wilborn, 80, right fielder for the 1940 Boston Bees.
- November 16 – Louis Nippert, 88, Cincinnati attorney who was co-owner of the Reds from 1967 to 1973 and majority owner from 1973 to 1981; during this period, the "Big Red Machine" captured four National League pennants and two World Series titles.
- November 16 – Gene Schott, 79, pitcher who played from 1935 through 1939 with the Cincinnati Reds, Philadelphia Phillies and Brooklyn Dodgers.
- November 20 – Stan Wasiak, 72, former catcher who managed in minor league baseball for 37 straight seasons (1950–1986), setting records for most games managed and games won.
- November 27 – Walt Tauscher, 90, pitcher for the Pittsburgh Pirates in 1928 and the Washington Senators in 1931, who also won 263 games in the minor leagues and managed at that level for five seasons.
- November 29 – Tuck Stainback, 81, backup outfielder for seven different major league teams from 1934 to 1946, who single-handedly prevented Carl Hubbell from pitching a perfect game in 1938.

=== December ===
- December 1 – Chile Gómez, 91, Mexican infielder for the Philadelphia Phillies between 1935 and 1942.
- December 1 – Sam Lowry, 72, pitcher who played for the Philadelphia Athletics during the 1942 and 1943 seasons.
- December 9 – Carl Barger, 62, attorney and executive; first club president of the expansion Florida Marlins, from July 8, 1991 until his death; previously, president of the Pirates from 1987 to 1991.
- December 10 – Babe Phelps, 84, catcher for the Washington Senators, Chicago Cubs, Brooklyn Dodgers and Pittsburgh Pirates in a span of 11 seasons from 1931 to 1942, whose .367 batting average in 1936 remains the highest for any major league catcher in the modern era (1901–present).
- December 12 – Rube Walker, 66, backup catcher for the 1948–1951 Chicago Cubs and 1951–1958 Brooklyn/Los Angeles Dodgers; later a longtime pitching coach for the Washington Senators, New York Mets and Atlanta Braves, who developed and nurtured the five-man rotation, including the pitching staff of the 1969 Amazin' Mets.
- December 15 – Dick Mulligan, 74, pitcher who played in parts of three seasons with the Washington Senators (1941), Philadelphia Phillies (1946) and Boston Braves (1946–1947).
- December 25 – Ed Donnelly, 60, relief pitcher for the 1959 Chicago Cubs, appearing in nine games.
- December 26 – Tom Gorman, 67, relief pitcher who played from 1952 to 1959 for the New York Yankees and the Kansas City Athletics.
- December 28 – Sal Maglie, nicknamed "The Barber", 75, All-Star pitcher for all three New York teams, primarily the Giants, during the 1950s, whose hardnosed style personified the rivalry among the Big Apple franchises; posted a 119–62 record and a 3.15 ERA in 303 career appearances, despite missing four seasons (1946–1949) under suspension for jumping to the outlaw Mexican League; also briefly appeared for the Indians and Cardinals; led National League in wins (1951) and ERA (1950), member of three NL champs and one World Series winner (1954 as a Giant); threw a no-hitter (as a Dodger), September 25, 1956 vs. Philadelphia.
