= East Side =

East Side or Eastside may refer to:

== Places ==
=== Australia ===
- East Side, Northern Territory

=== Canada ===
- Eastside, Ontario, a neighborhood in Sault Ste. Marie, Ontario
- Downtown Eastside, Vancouver, British Columbia
- The East Side, another name for East Vancouver, British Columbia

=== United Kingdom ===
- Eastside, Birmingham, West Midlands, England
- Eastside, Swansea, Wales

=== United States ===
- East San Jose, California
- Eastside, Long Beach, California
- Eastside Los Angeles, a neighborhood within Los Angeles
- East Side of Stamford, Connecticut
- Eastside, Atlanta, Georgia
- East Side, Chicago, Illinois
- Eastside, Flint, Michigan
- East Side, Kansas City, Missouri
- Eastside, Lexington, Kentucky, a neighborhood in southeastern Lexington
- East Side (Melrose), Massachusetts, a neighborhood
- East Side Township, Mille Lacs County, Minnesota
- Eastside, Paterson, New Jersey
- East Side, Binghamton, New York, a neighborhood of Binghamton
- East Side, Buffalo, New York
- East Side (Manhattan), New York
- Lower East Side, Manhattan, New York
- Upper East Side, Manhattan, New York
- Eastside, Oklahoma City, Oklahoma
- East Side, Pennsylvania
- East Side, Providence, Rhode Island, a collection of neighborhoods
- Eastside (King County, Washington), the eastern suburbs of Seattle, Washington
- The East Side (Milwaukee), Wisconsin

== Other uses ==
- Eastside High School (disambiguation)
- Eastside, part of St David's, Cardiff shopping centre, Cardiff, Wales
- "East Side", a 2000 song by Canadian pop group Smoother
- "Eastside" (song), a 2018 song by Benny Blanco, Halsey, and Khalid
- Eastside (film), a 1999 American film directed by Lorena David
- East Side (TV series), a 2023 Israeli drama TV series
- "Eastside", a song by Good Kid from their 2026 album Can We Hang Out Sometime?

== See also ==
- East Side, West Side (disambiguation)
