= Jim Abbott =

American baseball player (born 1967)

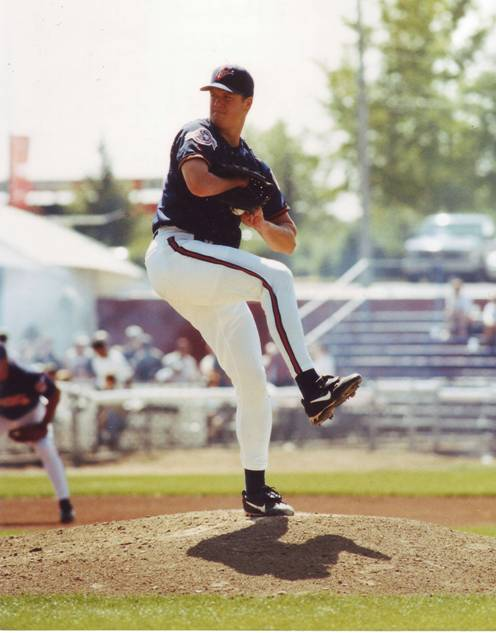
- Abbott in 1998
- Pitcher
- Born: September 19, 1967 (age 58); Flint, Michigan, U.S.
- Batted: Left Threw: Left

MLB debut
- April 8, 1989, for the California Angels

Last MLB appearance
- July 21, 1999, for the Milwaukee Brewers

MLB statistics
- Win–loss record: 87–108
- Earned run average: 4.25
- Strikeouts: 888
- Stats at Baseball Reference

Teams
- California Angels (1989–1992); New York Yankees (1993–1994); Chicago White Sox (1995); California Angels (1995–1996); Chicago White Sox (1998); Milwaukee Brewers (1999)

Career highlights and awards
- Pitched a no-hitter on September 4, 1993; Golden Spikes Award (1987)
Medals
Men's baseball
Representing United States
Olympic Games
Gold medal – first place	1988 Seoul	Team
Pan American Games
Silver medal – second place	1987 Indianapolis	Team
Baseball World Cup
Silver medal – second place	1988 Rome	Team

James Anthony Abbott (born September 19, 1967) is an American former professional baseball pitcher. He played in Major League Baseball (MLB) for the California Angels, New York Yankees, Chicago White Sox, and Milwaukee Brewers from 1989 to 1999. He was successful at the major league level despite being born without a right hand.

Abbott graduated from Flint Central High School and grew up in the East Village area of Flint, Michigan. He was drafted out of high school by the Toronto Blue Jays in the 36th round of the 1985 MLB draft but didn’t sign and decided to attend college. While with the University of Michigan, he got the James E. Sullivan Award as the nation's best amateur athlete in 1987 and won a gold medal in the demonstration event at the 1988 Summer Olympics. He was drafted in the first round of the 1988 MLB draft and reached the major leagues the next year.

As a member of the New York Yankees, he threw a no-hitter against the Cleveland Indians in 1993. He retired with a career record of 87 wins and 108 losses along with a 4.25 earned run average. He then became a motivational speaker.

== Playing career ==
=== Amateur years ===
Abbott was born in Flint, Michigan. He was picked up by the Ypsilanti, Michigan, American Legion team and went on to win the championship. He graduated from Flint Central High School in Michigan where he was a standout pitcher and quarterback. He played for the Grossi Baseball Club during the summer in Connie Mack Baseball. The Toronto Blue Jays selected Abbott in the 36th round in the 1985 Major League Baseball draft, but he did not sign with the Blue Jays.

Abbott enrolled at the University of Michigan and played college baseball for the Michigan Wolverines for three years from 1985 to 1988, leading them to two Big Ten Conference championships. In 1987, he won the James E. Sullivan Award as the top amateur athlete in the United States, becoming the first baseball player to win the award. He was the flag-bearer for the United States at the 1987 Pan American Games in Indianapolis, helping lead the US to a second-place finish. Baseball was a demonstration sport in the 1988 Summer Olympics; he pitched the final game, winning an unofficial gold medal for the United States. Abbott was voted the Big Ten Athlete of the Year in 1988.

Abbott's University of Michigan #31 jersey was retired at the Wolverines' April 18, 2009, home game against Michigan State University. In 2007, he was elected to the College Baseball Hall of Fame for his career at Michigan.

=== MLB career ===
The California Angels selected Abbott in the first round, with the eighth overall selection, of the 1988 Major League Baseball draft. In 1989, he joined the Angels' starting rotation as a rookie without playing in Minor League Baseball. That season, he posted a 12–12 win–loss record with an earned run average (ERA) of 3.92, and finished fifth in the year's American League (AL) Rookie of the Year Award voting.

In 1991, Abbott went 18–11 for the Angels, who finished in last place in the AL West with an 81–81 record. He posted the fourth-lowest ERA in the AL (2.89) while pitching 243 innings. As a result, he finished third in the AL Cy Young Award voting. In the 1992 season, he posted a 2.77 ERA (fifth-lowest in the AL) but his win–loss record fell to 7–15 for the sixth-place Angels. He also won the Tony Conigliaro Award in 1992.

In the offseason, the Angels attempted to trim payroll and traded Abbott to the New York Yankees for their top minor league prospect first baseman J. T. Snow, and pitchers Russ Springer and Jerry Nielsen. He had an up and down year for the Yankees but on September 4, 1993, Abbott pitched a no-hitter against the Cleveland Indians. On November 26 in the same year, he appeared as himself on the TV series Boy Meets World in the episode "Class Pre-Union" with fellow University of Michigan alumnus William Russ.

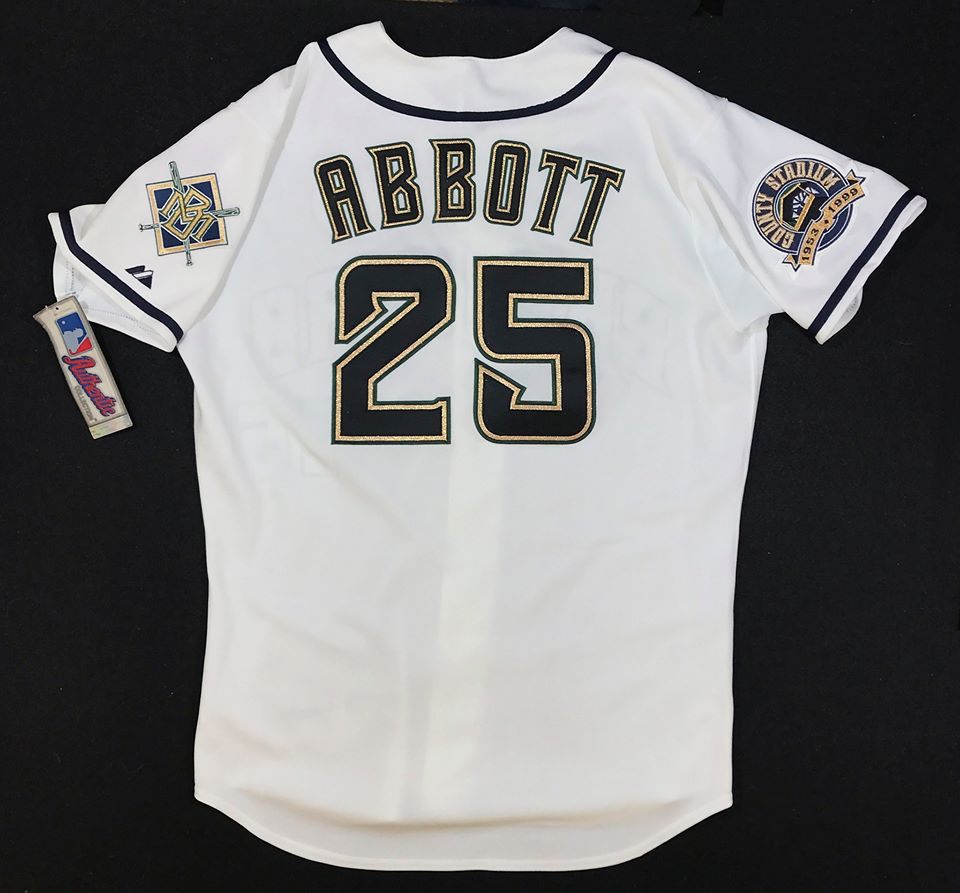
1999 Milwaukee Brewers #25 Jim Abbott home jersey

In 1994, Abbott's Yankees led the AL East, but the season was halted and the playoffs were canceled, due to a players strike on August 12. A free agent after the 1994 season, Abbott signed with the Chicago White Sox in April 1995. On July 27, 1995, the White Sox traded him and Tim Fortugno to the Angels for McKay Christensen, Andrew Lorraine, Bill Simas, and John Snyder. The Angels held an 11-game lead over the Seattle Mariners in August, but lost the AL West division title in a one-game playoff to the Mariners.

Abbott re-signed with the Angels for the 1996 season. He struggled through it, posting a 2–18 record with a 7.48 ERA. The Angels released him before Opening Day of the 1997 season, and he retired.

Abbott returned to the White Sox in 1998, starting five games and winning all five. He continued his comeback the following year with the Milwaukee Brewers, but pitched ineffectively. This was the first time he had played for a National League team, forcing him to bat for the first time in his career. He recorded two hits in 21 at bats during his Brewers stint. Both of his hits scored runs, and both hits came off Chicago Cubs pitcher Jon Lieber, albeit in different games.

Abbott retired after the 1999 season with a career record of 87–108, with a 4.25 ERA. He became eligible for the National Baseball Hall of Fame on the 2005 BBWAA ballot, but received only 13 votes (2.5% of the total vote) and fell off the ballot.

== Playing with one hand ==
When preparing to pitch the ball, Abbott would rest his glove on the end of his right forearm. After releasing the ball, he would quickly slip his hand into the glove, usually in time to field any balls that a two-handed pitcher would be able to field. Then he would secure the glove between his right forearm and torso, slip his hand out of it, and remove the ball from it, usually in time to throw out the runner at first or sometimes even start a double play. At all levels, teams tried to exploit his fielding disadvantage by repeatedly bunting to him.

Batting was not an issue for Abbott for the majority of his career, since the American League used the designated hitter, and he played only two seasons in the interleague play era. But he tripled in a spring training game in 1991 off Rick Reuschel, and when he joined the National League's Milwaukee Brewers in 1999, he had two hits in 21 at-bats, both off Jon Lieber. New York Yankees closer Mariano Rivera claimed to have witnessed Abbott hitting home runs during batting practice.

His disability inspired him to work harder than most. "As a kid I really wanted to fit in," Abbott says on his website about growing up with a disability. "Sports became a way for me to gain acceptance. I think this fueled my desire to succeed. I truly believe that difficult times and disappointments can push us to find abilities and strengths we wouldn't know existed without the experience of struggle."

== Awards ==
- 1986 — Abbott was presented with the United States Sports Academy's Mildred "Babe" Didrikson Zaharias Courage Award for his courageous action in overcoming adversity to excel in sports.
- 1987 — Abbott won the Golden Spikes Award.
- 1992 — Abbott was awarded the Tony Conigliaro Award, given annually by the Boston Red Sox to a Major League player who overcomes an obstacle and adversity through the attributes of spirit, determination, and courage that were trademarks of the Boston star.
- 2003 — Abbott was inducted into the Baseball Reliquary's Shrine of the Eternals.
- 2014 — Abbott was one of 12 recipients of the Henry Viscardi Achievement Awards.
- 2026 — Abbott was awarded the Jimmy V Award for Perseverance at the ESPY Awards

== Autobiography ==
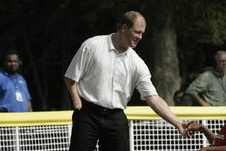
Jim Abbott, post retirement

In April 2012, Abbott's autobiography, Imperfect: An Improbable Life (ISBN 0345523253), co-written with Tim Brown, was published by Ballantine Books.

== See also ==
- Chad Bentz – American baseball player (born 1980)
- List of baseball players who went directly to Major League Baseball
- List of Major League Baseball no-hitters
- Pete Gray – American baseball player (1915–2002)
- University of Michigan Athletic Hall of Honor – Hall of fame in Ann Arbor, Michigan

Awards and achievements
Preceded by Chris Bosio	No-hitter pitcher September 4, 1993	Succeeded by Darryl Kile
