= MCSF (disambiguation) =

The Marine Corps Scholarship Foundation is a non-profit foundation providing scholarships to children of United States Marines and Navy Corpsmen.

MCSF may also refer to:

- Macrophage colony-stimulating factor (M-CSF), a hematopoietic cytokine
- Marine Corps Security Forces, a United States Marine Corps initialism
