= Russ Springer =

American baseball player (born 1968)

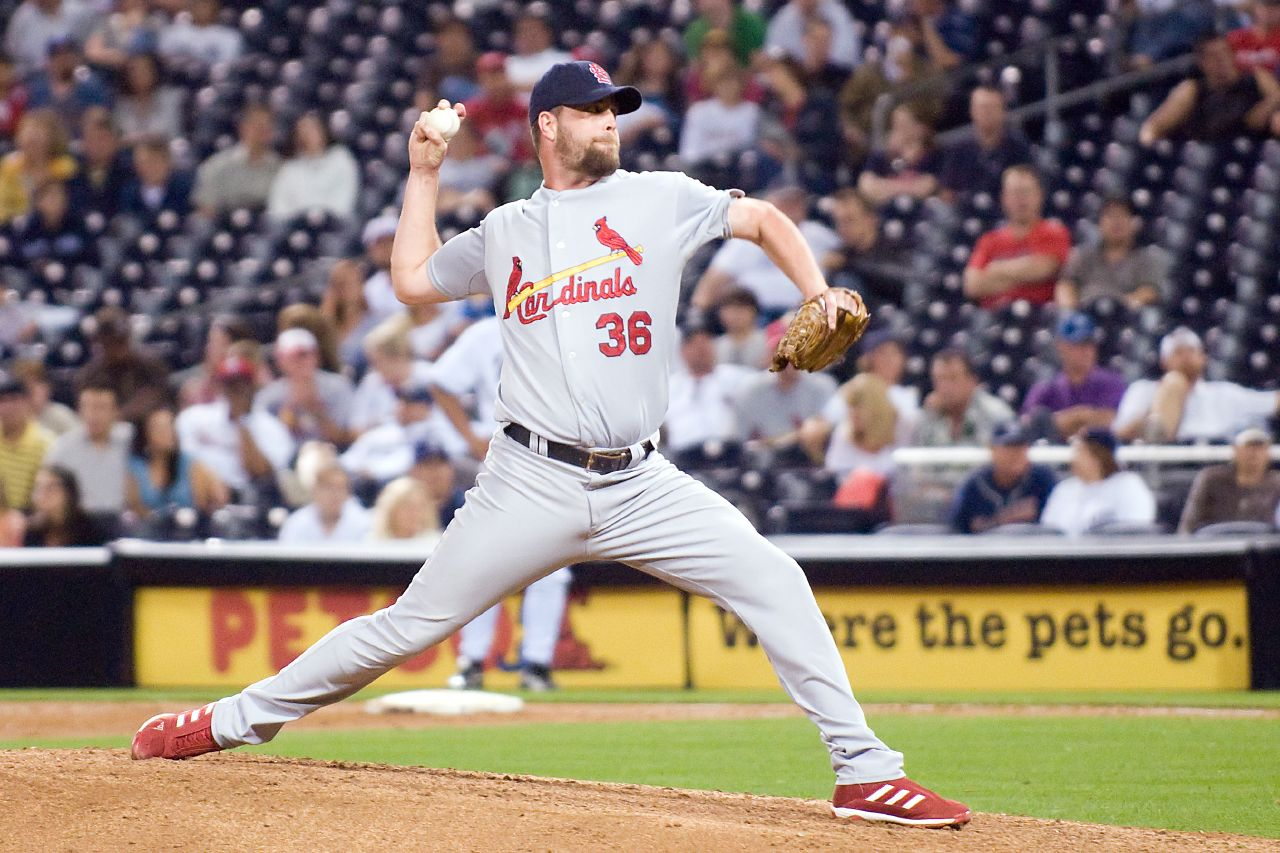
- Springer with the St. Louis Cardinals
- Pitcher
- Born: November 7, 1968 (age 57); Alexandria, Louisiana, U.S.
- Batted: Right Threw: Right

MLB debut
- April 17, 1992, for the New York Yankees

Last MLB appearance
- August 4, 2010, for the Cincinnati Reds

MLB statistics
- Win–loss record: 36–45
- Earned run average: 4.52
- Strikeouts: 775
- Stats at Baseball Reference

Teams
- New York Yankees (1992); California Angels (1993–1995); Philadelphia Phillies (1995–1996); Houston Astros (1997); Arizona Diamondbacks (1998); Atlanta Braves (1998–1999); Arizona Diamondbacks (2000–2001); St. Louis Cardinals (2003); Houston Astros (2004–2006); St. Louis Cardinals (2007–2008); Oakland Athletics (2009); Tampa Bay Rays (2009); Cincinnati Reds (2010)

Russell Paul Springer (born November 7, 1968) is an American former Major League Baseball relief pitcher. Springer made his major league debut on April 17, 1992, with the New York Yankees. He also pitched for the California Angels, Philadelphia Phillies, Arizona Diamondbacks, Atlanta Braves, Houston Astros, St. Louis Cardinals, Oakland Athletics, and Cincinnati Reds. He was a member of the Arizona Diamondbacks when they won the 2001 World Series, and was a member of the Houston Astros when they went to the World Series in 2005.

== College ==
Springer played college baseball for the LSU Tigers.

== Professional career ==
Springer was drafted by the New York Yankees in the 7th round of the 1989 Major League Baseball draft and signed with the Yankees immediately after the draft in June 1989. On December 6, 1992, Springer was traded by the Yankees with J. T. Snow and Jerry Nielsen to the California Angels in exchange for Jim Abbott. On August 15, 1995, he was traded by the Angels with Kevin Flora to the Philadelphia Phillies in exchange for Dave Gallagher. In the 1996–97 offseason, he signed with the Houston Astros.

In the 1997 MLB expansion draft, Springer was chosen by the Arizona Diamondbacks. On June 23, 1998, he was traded by the Diamondbacks to the Atlanta Braves in exchange for Alan Embree. In Atlanta, he picked up the win in game six of the 1999 NLCS, which clinched the pennant for the Braves. After the 1999 season, he re–signed with the Diamondbacks. He signed as a free agent with the St. Louis Cardinals in the 2002–03 offseason, and the Houston Astros in 2004.

Springer was involved in a May 16, 2006, incident in a game between the Astros and the San Francisco Giants with Barry Bonds. Bonds, with 713 career home runs at the time (one short of tying Babe Ruth for second on the career home runs list), was hit by a Springer pitch in the shoulder. Springer was then ejected along with Astros manager Phil Garner. He received an ovation from Astros fans as he left the field, leading to criticism from Giants manager Felipe Alou and broadcaster Jon Miller that the ovation was in bad taste. Springer was suspended for four games and Garner one game for the incident.

Springer was again signed by the Cardinals before the 2007 season. In 2007, he was 8–1 with an ERA of 2.18 with the Cardinals. On January 29, 2009, Springer signed with the Oakland Athletics. On August 8, 2009, he was claimed off waivers by the Tampa Bay Rays.

On July 15, 2010, Springer signed with the Cincinnati Reds. The agreement called for Springer to join the Reds' Triple–A team, the Louisville Bats, for a prep assignment prior to possibly joining the Reds. The Reds' general manager, Walt Jocketty, was also the general manager for the Cardinals during Springer's two stints there. On August 2, Springer was recalled from Louisville, replacing Carlos Fisher on the active roster.

Springer announced his retirement from professional baseball on January 30, 2011.
