= Eastside, Flint, Michigan =

Neighborhood in Michigan

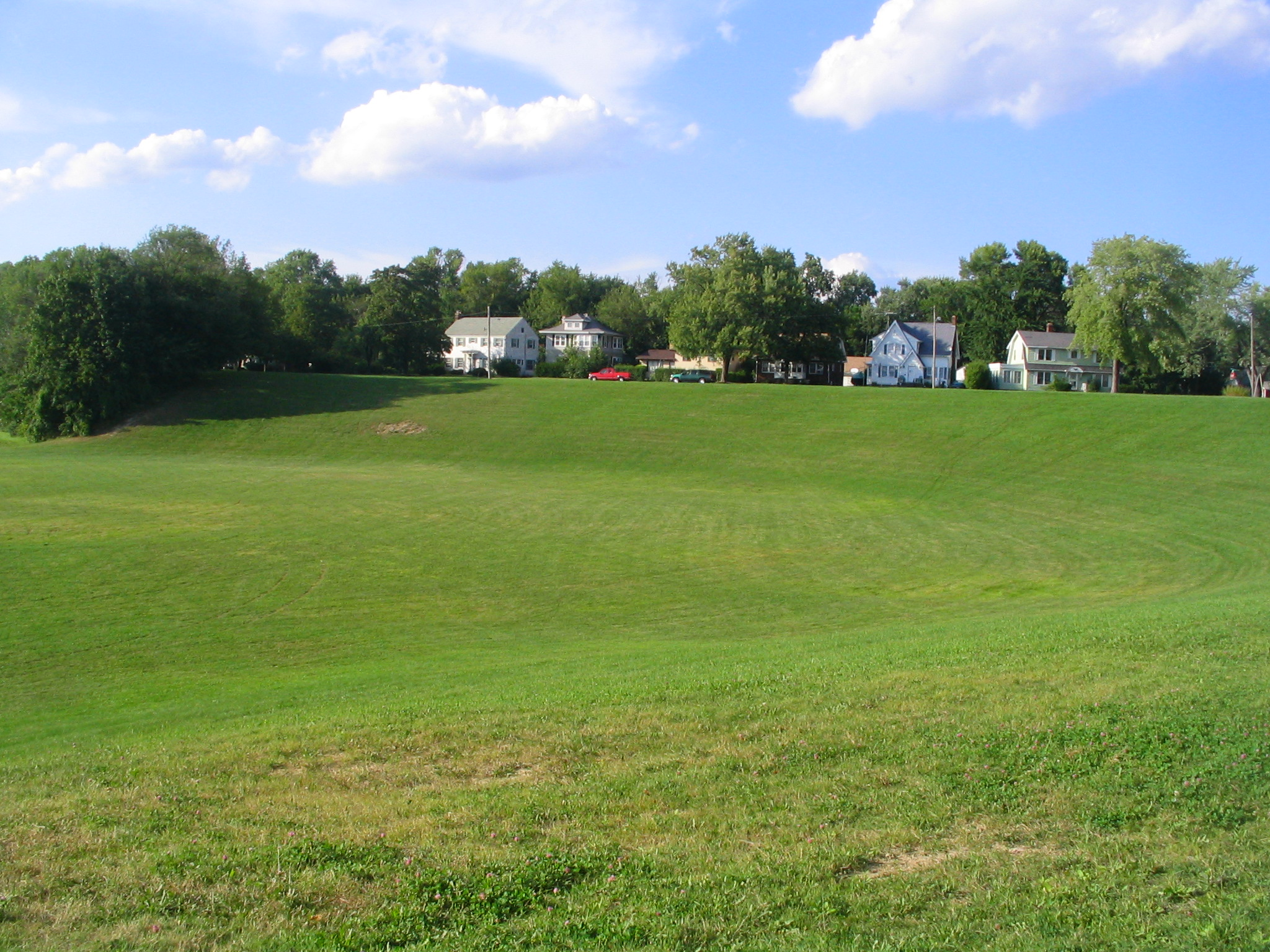
57-Acre Kearsley Park anchors the southern boundary of Flint's Eastside, and it is considered to be Flint's "showpiece" park.

Eastside, sometimes known as the State Streets, is a large neighborhood in Flint, Michigan. The neighborhood is bounded on the west by University Park and Buick City, the north by the Northeast Side, the east by Thrift City, and the south by East Village. The neighborhood is anchored on the north and south by two large parks, Whaley and Kearsley, and is also the site of Washington and Williams Elementary Schools, and formerly Homedale Elementary.

== Location ==
The most commonly given boundaries, established by the Olde Eastside Neighbors, are the Flint River to the west, Dort Highway to the east, Whaley Park to the north, and Robert T. Longway to the south. "State Streets" is drawn from the name of twenty streets that bisect the center of the neighborhood from north to south.

== History ==
Since 1904, the Eastside has been located adjacent to General Motors North Flint facilities, including Buick City. While subdivisions such as Civic Park and the East Village were originally designed as "bedroom neighborhoods" at some distance from the factories, the Eastside was built as a lower-income community from the beginning. This is demonstrated by the housing stock which consists almost strictly of wood-frame bungalows. Additionally, the neighborhood has been isolated from the rest of the city by the Flint River and, later, I-475 and Delphi East. Even in Flint's halcyon decades of the 1940s and 1950s, the Eastside was not considered a prosperous neighborhood.

Problems magnified with the deindustrialization of General Motors beginning in the early 1980s. The Eastside did not suffer from the rapid white-flight experienced across the river. At the same time, a large portion of the original population was displaced by southern migrants, and the neighborhood has gradually diversified.

== Present day ==
While the Eastside is Flint's most racially and ethnically diverse neighborhood, it has been continually plagued by gang-related violence and racial tension. Today, the Eastside is one of Flint's most troubled neighborhoods in terms of violent crime. Due in large part to these problems, and the affordability of housing stock, the Eastside is one of the few neighborhoods in Flint where the majority of residents are not landowners. Mass property acquisitions have led to the concentration of residences in the hands of a few landlords. This, combined with infrastructural degradation and the decline of Flint as a whole, have reduced property values to new lows.
