= J. T. Snow =

American baseball player (born 1968)

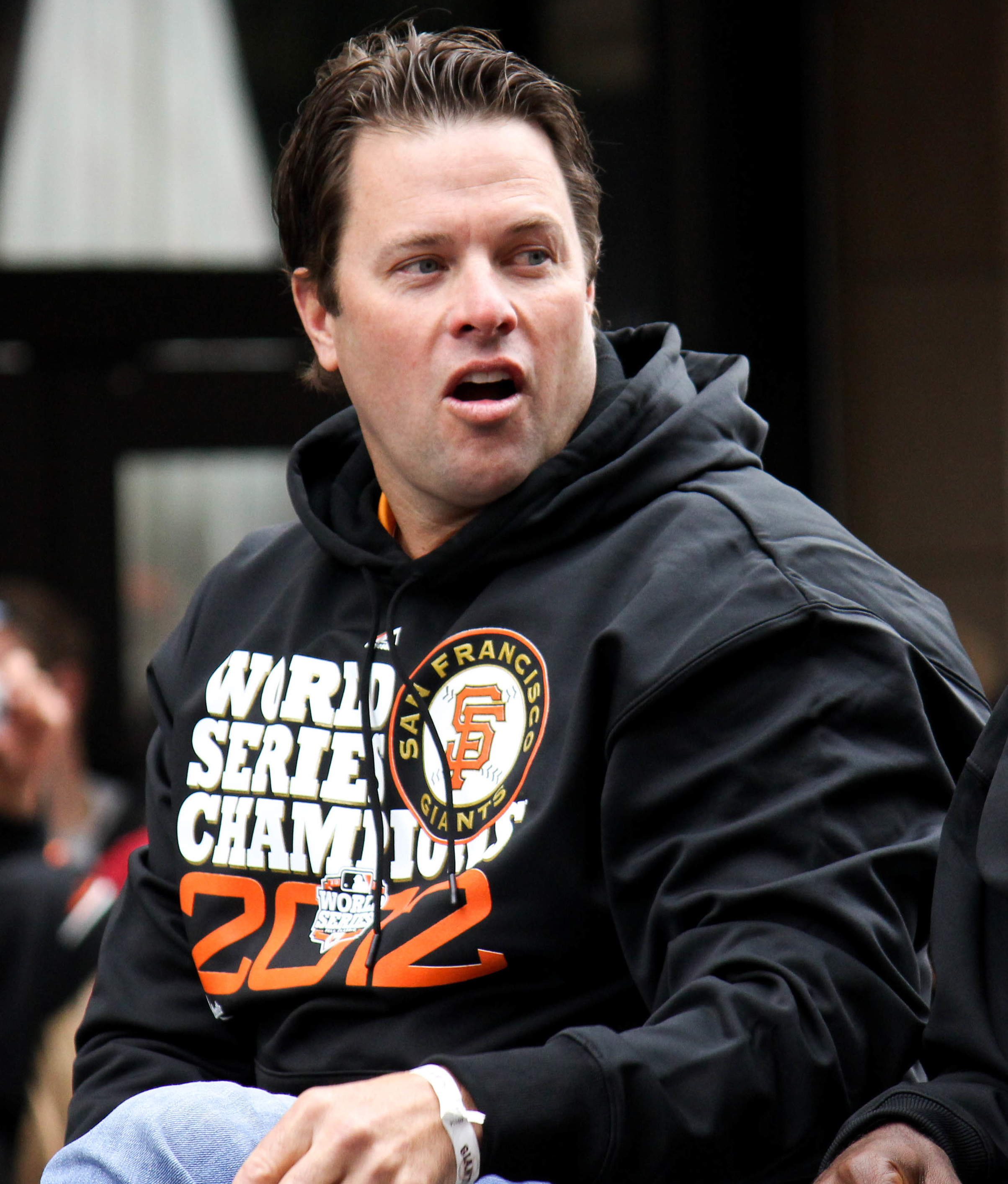
- Snow at the 2012 World Series victory parade

Modesto Roadsters
- First baseman
- Born: February 26, 1968 (age 58); Long Beach, California, U.S.
- Batted: Switch Threw: Left

MLB debut
- September 20, 1992, for the New York Yankees

Last MLB appearance
- September 27, 2008, for the San Francisco Giants

MLB statistics
- Batting average: .268
- Home runs: 189
- Runs batted in: 877
- Stats at Baseball Reference

Teams
- New York Yankees (1992); California Angels (1993–1996); San Francisco Giants (1997–2005); Boston Red Sox (2006); San Francisco Giants (2008)

Career highlights and awards
- 6× Gold Glove Award (1995–2000); San Francisco Giants Wall of Fame

Jack Thomas Snow Jr. (born February 26, 1968) is an American former professional baseball player, television sports color commentator, former bench coach for the Oakland Ballers and current manager for the Modesto Roadsters. He played as a first baseman in Major League Baseball from 1992 to 2006, most notably as a member of the San Francisco Giants. Snow excelled as a defensive player, winning six consecutive Gold Glove Awards as a first baseman between 1995 and 2000. After his playing career, Snow worked in radio and television broadcasting. He has also worked as a special assistant to the general manager for the Giants.

== Early life ==
Jack Thomas Snow Jr. was born on February 26, 1968, in Long Beach, California, to former NFL player Jack Snow and Merry Carole Shane, who died in 1998 from thyroid cancer. He has two sisters, Michelle and Stephanie.

His father worked with him at first base, throwing balls from shortstop purposely in the dirt to improve his fielding skills. He played recreational baseball in Seal Beach, for what is now known as Seal Beach PONY. Snow attended Los Alamitos High School in Los Alamitos, California and was awarded All-Orange County honors in baseball, football, and basketball. He played safety his junior year (1984) and quarterback his senior year (1985) on the varsity football team. Receiver Rob Katzaroff set an Orange County record with 93 single-season receptions while Snow played quarterback. On the basketball team, Snow played point guard. On the baseball team, Snow played with future Giants reliever Robb Nen and future UCLA Bruins outfielder Katzaroff. All three Griffin baseball players from the 1985 season were eventually drafted to play minor league baseball.

== College career ==
After high school, Snow attended the University of Arizona and played three seasons for the Arizona Wildcats baseball team, where his teammates included Kenny Lofton, Alan Zinter, Scott Erickson, Trevor Hoffman, and Kevin Long. In 1988, he played collegiate summer baseball for the Orleans Cardinals of the Cape Cod Baseball League.

== Professional career ==
=== Draft and minor leagues ===
The New York Yankees selected Snow in the fifth round of the 1989 Major League Baseball draft.

=== New York Yankees (1992) ===
He made his major league debut with the Yankees at the end of the 1992 season.

=== California Angels (1993–1996) ===
After the 1992 season, the Yankees traded Snow, Jerry Nielsen, and Russ Springer to the California Angels for Jim Abbott. Snow played for the Angels from 1993 to 1996, where he won two Gold Glove Awards.

=== San Francisco Giants (1997–2005) ===
Snow was traded to the Giants after the 1996 season for left-handed pitcher Allen Watson and minor league pitcher Fausto Macey.

While a switch-hitter earlier in his career, Snow batted exclusively left-handed after 1998. In 2000, he led the league in sacrifice flies with 14. After a two-year injury-riddled stretch from 2002 to 2003 when his batting average was .246, Snow rebounded in 2004 with a .327 average, hitting .387 after the All-Star break (which ranked second only to Ichiro Suzuki in the Major Leagues).

On June 26, 1999, Snow tagged out Los Angeles Dodgers pitcher Carlos Pérez using the "hidden ball trick", the last successful execution of the play in the 20th century.

In the 2000 National League Division Series against the New York Mets, with the Giants trailing 4–1 in the bottom of the ninth, Snow hit a three-run pinch-hit homer against Mets reliever Armando Benítez. However, the Giants failed to capitalize on their momentum, eventually falling in the 10th inning and going on to lose the series.

In the 2002 World Series, Snow was scoring a run in Game 5 off a Kenny Lofton triple and lifted 3-year-old Darren Baker, the Giants' batboy and son of then Giants’ manager Dusty Baker, by the jacket as he was crossing home plate. Darren had run out to collect Lofton's bat before the play was completed. This turned into a touching and memorable incident, but easily could have resulted in disaster with a small child wandering into the path of Snow and David Bell as they both barreled home to score. Following the incident with Darren Baker, Major League Baseball required batboys and girls to be at least 14 years of age. A photograph of this incident now hangs in the Baseball Hall of Fame, in Cooperstown, New York.

In the 2003 National League Division Series against the Florida Marlins, with the Giants trailing 7–6 in Game 4 in the ninth inning, he attempted to score from second base on a single to left field, but Jeff Conine's throw to the plate came in time as catcher Iván Rodríguez tagged Snow at the plate as Snow barreled into him, ending the game and the series. According to the Elias Sports Bureau, it was the first postseason series to end with the potential tying run thrown out at the plate.

=== Boston Red Sox (2006) ===
Snow's tenure with the Giants effectively ended when the team declined to offer him salary arbitration before the 2006 season. He signed a one-year, $2 million contract with the Boston Red Sox on January 6, 2006. After his father's death in 2006, Snow wore his father's number 84 in his honor. He served primarily in a platoon with Kevin Youkilis at first base until he requested to be designated for assignment due to a lack of playing time. He was granted his designation June 19, and was officially released eight days later.

=== San Francisco Giants (2008) and retirement ===
At the end of the 2006 season, Snow retired from baseball and began working as a color commentator on Giants radio broadcasts alongside play-by-play announcer Dave Flemming. He has also served as an advisor to the Giants' general manager, Brian Sabean, and as a roving minor league instructor for the Giants. Since 2013, he has worked as a college baseball broadcaster for the Pac-12 Network.

On September 24, 2008, the Giants signed Snow to a one-day contract to allow him to retire as a Giant. However, rather than immediately retiring after signing the symbolic contract and receiving no actual pay as is usually done, Snow was penciled into the starting lineup and took the field on September 27 against the Dodgers, but was replaced before the first pitch. It was a move that allowed Snow to officially take the field as a Giants player one last time. Eugenio Vélez, Omar Vizquel, and Rich Aurilia threw balls in the dirt to mess with Snow during fielding practice prior to the first pitch, but Snow still made the plays. For his brief official appearance, he received the prorated league minimum salary of $2,100.

J. T. Snow career statistics
Years	Games	PA	AB	R	H	2B	3B	HR	RBI	BB	SO	AVG	OBP	SLG	FLD%
16	1716	6553	5641	798	1509	293	19	189	877	760	1142	.268	.357	.427	.995

In 28 postseason games, Snow batted .327 (32-for-98) with 11 runs, 3 home runs and 15 RBI.

== Coaching career ==
On January 18, 2024, Snow was announced as the first base coach and bench coach for the Oakland Ballers of the Pioneer League during their inaugural season.

On November 13, 2025, Snow was named the manager of the newly formed Modesto Roadsters of the Pioneer League.

== Personal life ==
Snow lives in Northern California with his wife Gina.
