= 1992 Junior League World Series =

Tournament information
- Location: Taylor, Michigan
- Dates: August 17–22

Final positions
- Champions: Tucson, Arizona
- Runner-up: Lake Charles, Louisiana

The 1992 Junior League World Series took place from August 17–22 in Taylor, Michigan, United States. Tucson, Arizona defeated Lake Charles, Louisiana twice in the championship game.

== Teams ==
United States	International
(Indiana) Portage, Indiana Central	(Ontario) Orleans, Ontario Canada
(New Jersey) Ringwood, New Jersey East	(Belgium) Brussels, Belgium Europe
(Louisiana) Lake Charles, Louisiana South	(Sonora) Guaymas, Sonora Mexico
(Arizona) Tucson, Arizona; Sunnyside; West	Yabucoa, Puerto Rico Puerto Rico

== Results ==
Upper round 1	Upper round 2	Upper final	World Championship
—	New Jersey (F/8)	11
—	Belgium	10
1–0	New Jersey
1–0	Louisiana
—	Mexico	1
—	Louisiana	2
2–0	Louisiana
2–0	Puerto Rico
—	Canada	5
—	Arizona	11
1–0	Arizona	2
1–0	Puerto Rico	3
—	Indiana	1
—	Puerto Rico (F/8)	2	3–0	Louisiana	1	4
4–1	Arizona	8	5
Lower round 1	Lower round 2	Lower round 3	Lower final
1–1	Arizona	4
0–1	Belgium	1	1–1	Mexico	0	2–1	Puerto Rico	1
0–1	Mexico	17	2–1	Arizona	10	3–1	Arizona	8
2–1	New Jersey	1
1–1	New Jersey
0–1	Canada	5	1–1	Canada
0–1	Indiana	3

1992 Junior League World Series Champions
Sunnyside LL
Tucson, Arizona
