= East Side, West Side =

East Side, West Side may refer to:

== Books ==
- East Side West Side (novel), 1947 American novel by Marcia Davenport
- East Side West Side (Ritter book), 1998 American sports book by Lawrence S. Ritter

== Film and TV ==
- East Side - West Side (1923 film), American silent drama
- East Side West Side (1925 film), American silent animated short from Fleischer Studios
- East Side, West Side (1927 film), American silent drama
- East Side West Side (1929 film), American sound remake of 1925 Fleischer short a/k/a The Sidewalks of New York
- East Side, West Side (1949 film), American drama based on Marcia Davenport's novel
- East Side West Side (TV series), 1963–64 American drama series

== Songs ==
- "East Side, West Side (song)", 1894 American composition a/k/a "The Sidewalks of New York"
- "East Side West Side", 2014 song by American Jimmy Ruffin
