= Martin F. Rockmore =

Brigadier general in the United States Marine Corps

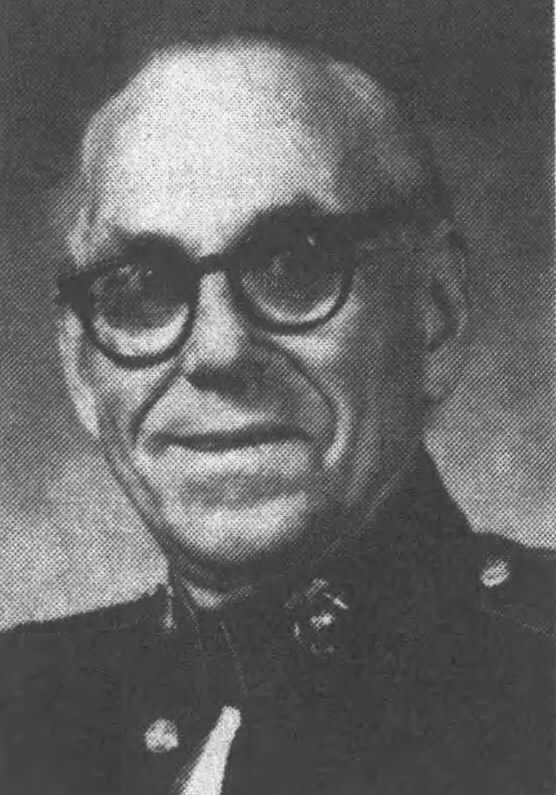
- Rockmore in 1988
- Born: September 5, 1917
- Died: June 27, 1992 (aged 74)
- Branch: U.S. Marine Corps
- Service years: ???–1964
- Rank: Brigadier general
- Conflicts: World War II
- Awards: Silver Star
- Spouse: Ruth

Martin F. Rockmore (September 5, 1917 – June 27, 1992) was a United States Marine Corps brigadier general.

== Life and career ==
Rockmore graduated from St. Lawrence University in 1938.

Rockmore was a decorated Marine veteran of World War II.

In 1962, Rockmore founded the Marine Corps Scholarship Foundation, an organization that provides needs-based scholarships for children whose parent served in the Marine Corps or as a Navy Corpsman or Religious Program Specialist.

Rockmore died on June 27, 1992, at the age of 74.
