= East Side West Side (Ritter book) =

1998 book by Lawrence S. Ritter

- Author: Lawrence S. Ritter
- Subject: Sports
- Genre: Non-fiction
- Published: 1998
- Publisher: Total Sports
- ISBN: 0-9656949-6-8

East Side, West Side: Tales of New York Sporting Life 1910–1960 is a sports book written by Lawrence S. Ritter and published in 1998. It is a Total Sports production and was distributed by Andrews McNeel.

The book centers on popular sports sites and figures of New York between 1910 and 1960. Among the personalities the book talks about in depth are Babe Ruth, Lou Gehrig, Joe Louis, Primo Carnera, Tony Canzoneri, Sugar Ray Robinson, Casey Stengel, Mickey Mantle, Joe DiMaggio, Lou Stillman, Jacob Ruppert and more. Sports covered in depth are baseball, basketball, boxing, hockey and horse racing, all of which were popular sports in New York during the 50 years covered by the book.
