= Harry Mallett (footballer) =

Australian rules footballer, born 1914

Personal information
- Full name: Henry George Mallett
- Born: 2 December 1914; Port Melbourne, Victoria
- Died: 12 June 1992 (aged 77); New South Wales
- Original team: Sandringham
- Height: 171 cm (5 ft 7 in)
- Weight: 67 kg (148 lb)

Playing career^{1}
| Years | Club | Games (Goals) |
| 1934–36 | Sandringham (VFA) | 25 (5) |
| 1936 | Essendon | 2 (0) |
- ^{1} Playing statistics correct to the end of 1936.

Henry George Mallett (2 December 1914 – 12 June 1992) was an Australian rules footballer who played with Essendon in the Victorian Football League (VFL).
