= Svend Jørgensen =

Danish hockey player

Personal information
- Nationality: Danish
- Born: 24 December 1904 Holbæk, Denmark
- Died: 10 June 1992 (aged 87) Frederiksberg, Denmark

Sport
- Sport: Field hockey

Svend Jørgensen (24 December 1904 – 10 June 1992) was a Danish field hockey player. He competed in the men's tournament at the 1948 Summer Olympics.
