= Eastside, Lexington =

Eastside
- Neighborhood of Lexington, Kentucky
- Interactive map of Eastside
- Coordinates: 38.036°N 84.481°W
- Country: United States
- State: Kentucky
- County: Fayette
- City: Lexington

Population (2000)
  - Total: 1,687
- Time zone: UTC-5 (Eastern (EST))
  - Summer (DST): UTC-4 (EDT)
- ZIP code: 40502, 40508
- Area code: 859

Eastside is a neighborhood in southeastern Lexington, Kentucky, United States. Its boundaries are Walton Avenue to the north, CSX railroad tracks to the east, Richmond Avenue to the south, and Main Street to the west.

== Neighborhood statistics ==
- Area: 0.150 square miles (0.39 km^{2})
- Population: 1,687
- Population density: 7,613 people per square mile
- Median household income: $42,655
