= Willie Wynn =

American baseball player

- Catcher
- Born: August 25, 1917; Windsor, North Carolina, U.S.
- Died: July 14, 1992 (aged 74); Camden, New Jersey, U.S.
- Batted: Right Threw: Right

Negro league baseball debut
- 1944, for the Newark Eagles

Last appearance
- 1948, for the Newark Eagles

Teams
- Newark Eagles (1944–1945, 1947–1948); Philadelphia Stars (1946–1947)

Willie M. "Fourteen" Wynn (August 25, 1917 – July 14, 1992) was an American professional baseball catcher in the Negro leagues. He played with the Newark Eagles in 1944 and 1945 and in 1947 and 1948, and the Philadelphia Stars in 1946 and 1947.
