= Eddie Vines =

American baseball player

- First baseman
- Born: April 27, 1918; Tuscaloosa, Alabama, U.S.
- Died: June 9, 1992 (aged 74); Pontiac, Michigan, U.S.
- Batted: Left Threw: Right

Negro league baseball debut
- 1940, for the Birmingham Black Barons

Last appearance
- 1940, for the Birmingham Black Barons

Teams
- Birmingham Black Barons (1940)

Eddie Benjamin Vines (April 27, 1918 – June 9, 1992) was an American Negro league first baseman in the 1940s.

A native of Tuscaloosa, Alabama, Vines played for the Birmingham Black Barons in 1940. He died in Pontiac, Michigan in 1992 at age 74.
