= Central Park, Flint =

Neighborhood in Flint, Michigan, United States

Coordinates: 43.0184°N 83.6807°W

The Central Park is a neighborhood in the City of Flint, Michigan. It is bounded as follows: east of Caeser Chavez avenue, south of Kearsley street, west of Crapo street, and north of East Court street.

== Description ==
Many of the houses in this neighborhood date back to the late 19th century, when the city of Flint was transitioning from horse-drawn carriage assembly to automobile manufacturing. Currently, the central park neighborhood association is a collection of residents who meet monthly in promoting this viable area located between the college-cultural area and the downtown municipal and business center in which wide-ranging demographic groups from college students to retirees reside.
