= Marine Corps Scholarship Foundation =

Organization

- Abbreviation: MCSF
- Formation: 1962
- Headquarters: Alexandria, Virginia, U.S.A.
- Website: https://www.mcsf.org/

The Marine Corps Scholarship Foundation is a privately funded, 501(c)(3) non-profit organization located in Alexandria, Virginia. The organization provides academic scholarships to children of United States Marines and Navy Corpsmen. The Scholarship Foundation is the Nation's oldest and largest provider of need-based scholarship to military children. Their funding is provided by private supporters, including individuals, corporations, and other nonprofit foundations. The organization's mission is to "Honor Marines by Educating Their Children."

In October 2025, Lieutenant General George W. Smith Jr., USMC (RET), was announced as the new Chairman of the Board of Directors.

== History ==
The Marine Corps Scholarship Foundation was established in 1962 in New York City. When a group of service-minded Marines, led by Brigadier General Martin F. Rockmore, learned that a Marine World War II Medal of Honor recipient could not afford to send his child to college. Concerned, General Rockmore and his peers organized a charity ball that December, which raised $1,500. At the Ball, these funds were awarded as a scholarship to a single student. The annual charity ball, known as the New York Leatherneck Ball, continues to this day and celebrated its 50th anniversary in 2012. The original event has inspired numerous balls, galas, golf tournaments, and other fundraisers across the country. Today, the Scholarship Foundation, with the assistance of volunteers across the country, hosts more than 35 fundraising activities annually.

== Scholarship ==
The scholarships provide access to affordable education for the children of Marines and Navy Corpsmen pursuing postsecondary, undergraduate, and career-technical education programs.

The Scholarship Foundation's awards are primarily need-based. Qualified applicants must be the child of a Marine or Navy Corpsman, and their maximum family income must not exceed that of the current pay scale of a sergeant major.

Scholarship applications are accepted January 1 - March 1, annually, via the Scholarship Foundation's website.

As of March 2026, the scholarship foundation has awarded more than 55,000 scholarships, valued at over $200 million.

== Special Commitments ==
Through its "Heroes Tribute for Children of the Fallen" and "Heroes Tribute for Children of the Wounded" scholarship programs, the Scholarship Foundation has made special commitments to the sons and daughters of Marines and Navy Corpsmen whose parent has been killed or wounded in combat.

== Leadership ==
The Chairman of the Scholarship Foundation's Board of Directors is Lieutenant General George W. Smith Jr., USMC (Ret). Lieutenant Colonel Ted Probert USMC (Ret) serves as President and CEO of the company.
