= Herb Jones (footballer) =

Australian rules footballer (1915–1992)

Personal information
- Full name: Herb Jones
- Born: 28 August 1915
- Died: 19 June 1992 (aged 76)
- Height: 182 cm (6 ft 0 in)
- Weight: 82 kg (181 lb)
- Position: Half back flanker

Playing career^{1}
Years	Club	Games (Goals)
1936–44	North Melbourne	65 (5)
- ^{1} Playing statistics correct to the end of 1944.

Herb Jones (28 August 1915 – 19 June 1992) was an Australian rules footballer who played with North Melbourne in the Victorian Football League (VFL).
