= Bill Vanthoff =

Australian rules footballer, born 1909

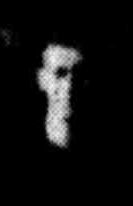

Personal information
- Full name: Evert William Vanthoff
- Born: 1 January 1909; Elmore, Victoria
- Died: 7 June 1992 (aged 83)
- Original team: Terang
- Height: 180 cm (5 ft 11 in)
- Weight: 75 kg (165 lb)
- Position: Forward

Playing career^{1}
Years	Club	Games (Goals)
1930–1934	Melbourne	60 (42)
- ^{1} Playing statistics correct to the end of 1934.

Evert William Vanthoff (1 January 1909 – 7 June 1992) was an Australian rules footballer who played with Melbourne in the Victorian Football League (VFL).

Vanthoff was a small forward, who could also play as a rover. In the 1930 VFL season, his first, he kicked four goals in a win over Footscray, which would remain a career best. He represented the VFL in the 1933 Sydney Carnival, against South Australia.

He served with the Royal Australian Air Force in World War II.

During the 27 years he worked at the Melbourne Cricket Ground, he held various positions. He spent 10 years as assistant curator to Bert Lutrell and then was the head curator himself for six years in the 1950s. In 1956 he left to become a groundsman at Trinity Grammar School.
