= Oran Frazier =

American baseball player

- Second baseman
- Born: November 26, 1908; Montgomery, Alabama, U.S.
- Died: August 15, 1992 (aged 83); Selma, Alabama, U.S.
- Threw: Right

Negro league baseball debut
- 1932, for the Montgomery Grey Sox

Last appearance
- 1932, for the Montgomery Grey Sox

Teams
- Montgomery Grey Sox (1932)

Oran Franklin Frazier (November 26, 1908 – August 15, 1992) was an American Negro league second baseman in the 1930s.

A native of Montgomery, Alabama, Frazier attended Alabama State Teachers College. He played for the Montgomery Grey Sox in 1932. Frazier died in Selma, Alabama in 1992 at age 83.
