= East Village, Flint =

Neighborhood in Flint, Michigan, U.S.

The East Village is a neighborhood located on the East Side of Flint, Michigan, bounded on the west by Downtown Flint, particularly I-475, north by the same expressway, east by Crapo Street and the south by Court Street and the Fairfield Village neighborhood. It is the site of Flint Central High School, the Flint Cultural Center and their affiliated institutions. The neighborhood is occasionally confused with the Eastside, due to their proximity and similar names. Along these lines, East Villagers sometimes identify themselves as East Siders. The East Village term is included by some residents as the college and Cultural neighborhood, which is the wealthy enclave to the south east of the 4 square blocks that define Flint's East Village.

== Location ==
There is some ambiguity among residents as to specific neighborhood boundaries. Mainly this is a result of the distribution areas for East Village Magazine. Broadly speaking, the surrounding area is bounded on the north by Robert T. Longway, the south by Interstate 69 (I-69), the west by I-475, and the east by M-54 (Dort Highway). Within this area, however, there are several smaller neighborhoods separate from East Village. These include the area north of Court Street and west of Crapo Street, named Central Park, and the area south of Court Street and west of Gilkey Creek, known as the Interchange Neighborhood and Fairfield Village. The affluent enclave within this area is referred to as the "College Cultural neighborhood" by its residents and is centered off Court Street East of Crapo Street and West of Dort Hwy, bordered by Mott Community College, Pierce Park and Woodlawn Park. In the narrowest sense, then, "East Village" consists of the neighborhood bordered on the west by Gilkey Creek and Mott Community College, and on the other sides by Longway, Dort, and I-69.

== The Name "East Village" ==
This title came about as an informal designation by area residents after the 1976 founding of East Village Magazine. Editor Gary Custer has stated that the name first appeared July 3, 1976 on the initial issue of the publication. Being east of somewhere, specifically downtown, and following Marshal McLuhan's ideas that advanced communications had created a "global village," the name was born. Custer said that the whole concept was that East Village was a state of mind, not a physical place.

== History ==
Scenic locales like Woodlawn Park attracted development of an enclave of wealthy residents, particularly south of Court Street. More historically diverse areas, such as the area off Crapo Street to I-475 which is the real East Village, did not experience many of these the associated problems that the college and Cultural enclave has attracted. This upper-income area went through a troubled period in the 1960s during the successful challenge of housing compacts that prevented African Americans from moving into the area. In the 1950s and 60s, construction of I-69 and I-475 somewhat isolated the community from its neighbors; in particular, Lapeer Road and Dort Highway are now the only connections between the East Village neighborhoods and Kent Park and Sugar Hill to the south.

== Present day ==
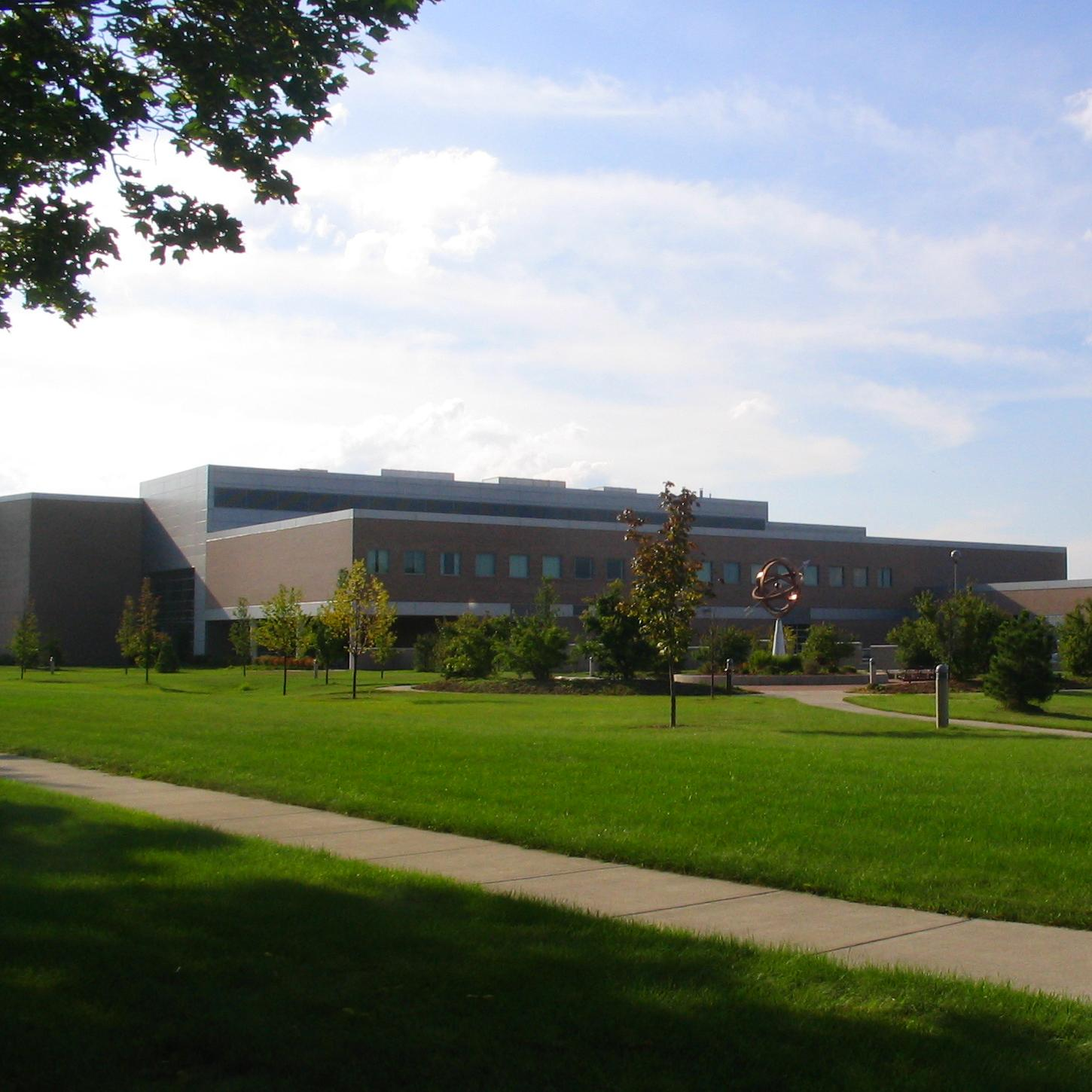
In January 2006 the sprawling St. Joseph's hospital complex was demolished and replaced with Mott Community College's Regional Technology Center, a sign of ongoing development in the East Village.

Today, the East Village is one of Flint's better known smaller neighborhoods, being the site of Mott Community College, Central High School, and the Flint Cultural Center. While the area suffers from the same population exodus that has affected Flint generally, housing values have remained fairly stable. This is partly due to the expansion of Mott Community College, which took advantage of the recent demolition of St. Joseph Hospital to build a Regional Technology Center. The East Village is more racially integrated than much of the city, but remains predominantly white.
