= Joe Fillmore =

American Negro league baseball player (1914–1992)

- Pitcher
- Born: March 14, 1914; Victoria, Texas, U.S.
- Died: September 20, 1992 (aged 78); Los Angeles, California, U.S.
- Batted: Right Threw: Right

Negro league baseball debut
- 1941, for the Philadelphia Stars

Last appearance
- 1946, for the Philadelphia Stars
- Stats at Baseball Reference

Teams
- Philadelphia Stars (1941–1942, 1945–1946)

Joe Alexander Fillmore (March 14, 1914 – September 20, 1992), nicknamed "Fireball", was an American Negro league baseball pitcher for the Philadelphia Stars.

A native of Victoria, Texas, Fillmore made his Negro leagues debut for the Philadelphia Stars in 1941. He served in the United States Army in World War II. He was an ace pitcher for the integrated March Field Flyers in Riverside, California After his service, Fillmore returned to the Stars for the 1945 and 1946 seasons, then played in the Mexican League in 1947. He died in Los Angeles, California in 1992 at age 78. He was interred at Angelus-Rosedale Cemetery.
