= Eastside, Swansea =

Coordinates: 51°39′N 3°54′W

Eastside is an area of Swansea, Wales which is loosely defined as the populated areas to the east of the River Tawe. The Swansea local authority has a housing authority covering Eastside which covers the areas of Birchgrove, Talycoppa, Trallwn, Winch Wen, Port Tennant and St Thomas.

== See also ==
- Swansea East (UK Parliament constituency)
