= Cash Fitzgerald =

Australian rules footballer

Personal information
- Full name: Cashen Noel Keon Fitzgerald
- Born: 16 May 1921
- Died: 23 June 1992 (aged 71); Warrandyte, Victoria
- Height: 175 cm (5 ft 9 in)
- Weight: 75 kg (165 lb)

Playing career^{1}
Years	Club	Games (Goals)
1947	Hawthorn	3 (0)
- ^{1} Playing statistics correct to the end of 1947.

Cashen Noel Keon Fitzgerald (16 May 1921 – 23 June 1992) was an Australian rules footballer who played with Hawthorn in the Victorian Football League (VFL).
