= Eastside High School =

Eastside High School or East Side High School can refer to:

- East Side High School (Cleveland, Mississippi)
- Eastside High School (Coeburn, Virginia)
- Eastside High School (Covington, Georgia) (Atlanta area)
- Eastside High School (Gainesville, Florida)
- Eastside High School (Lancaster, California) (Los Angeles area)
- Eastside High School (Sacramento, California)
- Eastside High School (Madison, Wisconsin)
- Eastside High School (Camden, New Jersey) (Philadelphia area)
- East Side High School (Newark, New Jersey) (New York City area)
- Eastside High School (Paterson, New Jersey) (New York City area), highlighted in the 1989 film Lean on Me
- Eastside High School (Taylors, South Carolina) (Greenville-Spartanburg area)
- Eastside Junior-Senior High School (Butler, Indiana)
