= Willie Hutchinson =

American baseball player

- Pitcher
- Born: April 23, 1921
- Died: October 10, 1992 (aged 71); Denver, Colorado, U.S.
- Batted: Right Threw: Right

Negro league baseball debut
- 1939, for the Kansas City Monarchs

Last appearance
- 1949, for the Memphis Red Sox
- Stats at Baseball Reference

Teams
- Kansas City Monarchs (1939); Memphis Red Sox (1940–1941); Kansas City Monarchs (1941); Memphis Red Sox (1942–1944, 1946, 1948–1949)

Willie D. Hutchinson (April 23, 1921 – October 10, 1992), nicknamed "Ace", was an American Negro league pitcher between 1939 and 1949.

Hutchinson made his Negro leagues debut in 1939 with the Kansas City Monarchs. He played the majority of his career with the Memphis Red Sox, and in his final season of 1949 represented Memphis in the East–West All-Star Game. Hutchinson went on to play in the minor leagues in the early 1950s. He died in Denver, Colorado in 1992 at age 71.
