= Glenn Dixon =

American baseball player

- Outfielder
- Born: July 11, 1908; Little Rock, Arkansas, U.S.
- Died: June 2, 1992 (aged 83); Sikeston, Missouri, U.S.
- Batted: Right Threw: Right

Negro league baseball debut
- 1937, for the St. Louis Stars

Last appearance
- 1937, for the St. Louis Stars

Teams
- St. Louis Stars (1937)

Glenn M. Dixon (July 11, 1908 – June 2, 1992) was an American Negro league outfielder in the 1930s.

A native of Little Rock, Arkansas, Dixon played for the St. Louis Stars in 1937. In nine recorded games, he posted four hits in 32 plate appearances. Dixon died in Sikeston, Missouri in 1992 at age 83.
