= Jess Brooks =

American baseball player

- Third baseman
- Born: February 21, 1913; Tacoma, Washington, U.S.
- Died: June 2, 1992 (aged 79); Los Angeles, California, U.S.
- Batted: Unknown Threw: Right

Negro league baseball debut
- 1937, for the Kansas City Monarchs

Last appearance
- 1937, for the Kansas City Monarchs
- Stats at Baseball Reference

Teams
- Kansas City Monarchs (1937)

Jess Edward Brooks (February 21, 1913 – June 2, 1992) was an American professional baseball third baseman in the Negro leagues. He played with the Kansas City Monarchs in 1937. He played football, basketball, and baseball at the College of Puget Sound.

Brooks died on June 2, 1992 at the age of 79. He was interred at Mountain View Cemetery in Altadena, California.
