= Rufus Baker =

American baseball player

- Shortstop
- Born: September 20, 1918; Bridgeport, Connecticut, U.S.
- Died: June 22, 1992 (aged 73); Bridgeport, Connecticut, U.S.
- Batted: Right Threw: Right

Negro league baseball debut
- 1943, for the New York Black Yankees

Last appearance
- 1950, for the New York Black Yankees
- Stats at Baseball Reference

Teams
- New York Black Yankees (1943-1950)

Rufus Baker (September 20, 1918 – June 22, 1992) was an American professional baseball shortstop in the Negro leagues. He played from 1943 to 1950 with the New York Black Yankees.
