= Jerry Nielsen =

American baseball player (born 1966)

- Pitcher
- Born: August 5, 1966 (age 59); Sacramento, California, U.S.
- Batted: Left Threw: Left

MLB debut
- July 12, 1992, for the New York Yankees

Last MLB appearance
- July 8, 1993, for the California Angels

MLB statistics
- Win–loss record: 1–0
- Earned run average: 5.91
- Strikeouts: 20
- Stats at Baseball Reference

Teams
- New York Yankees (1992); California Angels (1993)

Gerald Arthur Nielsen (born August 5, 1966) is an American former professional baseball pitcher.
