= List of Kettering University people =

This is a list of notable people associated with Kettering University.

== Alumni ==
Name	Graduation year	Occupation
Mary Barra	1985	CEO and chairman, General Motors Corporation
Larry Burns	1975	Vice president, General Motors Corporation
Don Chaffin	1962	Professor of Industrial & Biomedical Engineering, University of Michigan
Edward Nicholas Cole	1933	Former president, General Motors; former chairman, Checker Motors Corporation
Ivan Deveson	1959	Retired lord mayor of Melbourne, Australia
Elliott M. (Pete) Estes	1938	President, General Motors
Pam Fletcher	1989	CEO, Sion Power
David Hermance	1970	Executive engineer, Advanced Technology Vehicles, Toyota
Henry Juszkiewicz	1974	CEO, Gibson Guitar Corporation
Bob Kagle	1978	General partner, Benchmark Capital
David Kenny	1984	Managing partner, VivaKi, Publicis Groupe
Aaron Kyle	2002	Professor of the Practice in the Department of Biomedical Engineering, Duke University
Ryan Mathews	2001	NASCAR driver
F. James McDonald	1944	Former president, General Motors Corporation
John Thomas Mentzer		Chancellor's Professor and Vivienne R. Bruce Chair of Excellence in Business, University of Tennessee
Dane Miller	1969	Chairman, president, and CEO, Biomet
Raj Nair	1987	CEO, singer
Rodney O'Neal	1976	Former president and CEO, Delphi Automotive
Stan O'Neal	1974	Former CEO, Merrill Lynch
William H. Osborne	1983	President and CEO, Federal Signal Corporation
Jeffrey Owens	1978	Former chief technology officer, Delphi Automotive
Terence Dennis Sherman Jr	1987	Senior Controls Engineer, Bridgestone Americas
Thomas Snyder	1967	President, Ivy Tech Community College of Indiana
Sonia Syngal	1993	Former CEO, The Gap
Tim Willis	1988	VP of Business Operations, NVIDIA
Qasar Younis	2004	Co-founder of Applied Intuition

== Honorary degree recipients ==
Name	Degree	Awarded	Occupation
Carol Bartz	Honorary Doctor of Management	June 1997	Chairman, president, CEO, AutoDesk
Dave Bing	Honorary Doctor of Management	June 2000	NBA player
Curtis Carlson	Honorary Doctor of Science	June 2008	President, CEO, SRI International
Ben Carson	Honorary Doctor of Humane Letters	June 1997	Neurosurgeon, Johns Hopkins Hospital, Baltimore, Maryland
Jaime Escalante	Honorary Doctor of Humanities	June 1989	Mathematics teacher, Garfield High School (Los Angeles County, California)
David Hermance '70	Honorary Doctor of Engineering (posthumous)	June 2008	Executive engineer, Advanced Technology Vehicles, Toyota
Dean Kamen	Honorary Doctor of Engineering	December 2001	President, DEKA Research and Development; founder, FIRST; inventor of Segway
David A. Kenny	Honorary Doctor of Management	June 2014	CEO and chairman, The Weather Channel
Dale E. Kildee	Honorary Doctor of Humane Letters	December 2007	Member, United States House of Representatives
Carl Levin	Honorary Doctor of Humane Letters	June 2011	United States senator
Robert Lutz	Honorary Doctor of Management	June 2003	Chairman, General Motors North America
John H. McConnell	Honorary Doctor of Management	December 1998	Founder, Worthington Industries
Scott McNealy	Honorary Doctor of Engineering	June 1994	President, chairman, CEO, Sun Microsystems
Rodney O'Neal	Honorary Doctor of Engineering	June 2015	Retired CEO, Delphi Automotive
Stan O'Neal '74	Honorary Doctor of Management	December 2002	CEO, Merrill Lynch
Paul F. Oreffice	Honorary Doctor of Management	June 1987	Chairman, president, CEO, Dow Chemical Company
Stanford R. Ovshinsky	Honorary Doctor of Engineering	December 2010	Inventor
L. Brooks Patterson	Honorary Doctor of Humane Letters	December 2006	County executive, Oakland County, Michigan
John F. Smith, Jr.	Honorary Doctor of Engineering	June 1998	President, CEO, chairman, General Motors
Roger Bonham Smith	Honorary Doctor of Management	June 1986	Chairman, General Motors
Frank Stronach	Honorary Doctor of Management	December 1997	Chairman, Magna International
Arthur L. Tuuri	Honorary Doctor of Humane Letters	December 1994	Pediatrician, Mott Children's Health Center, Flint, Michigan
MaliVai Washington	Honorary Doctor of Humane Letters	June 2002	Professional tennis player
Michael M. Wood	Honorary Doctor of Humane Letters	June 2009	Former United States ambassador to Sweden; Chairman, Redwood Investments LLC
Steve Wozniak	Honorary Doctor of Engineering	December 2005	Co-founder of Apple Computer
Chester A. Huber '77	Honorary Doctor of Engineering	June 2006	Former President and CEO, General Motors OnStar
L. Brooks Patterson	Honorary Doctor of Humane Letters	December 2006	Oakland County Executive
Joseph B. Anderson	Honorary Doctor of Management	June 2007	Chairman and CEO of Tag Holding Companies in Troy, MI
Congressman, Dale E. Kildee	Honorary Doctor of Humane Letters	December 2007	Congressman (D), representing 5th District in the State of Michigan
Gary L. Cowger '70	Honorary Doctor of Engineering	December 2007	Chairman and CEO, GLC Ventures and Former Global Group Vice President, General Motors
Curtis R. Carlson	Honorary Doctor of Science	June 2008	Former President and CEO, SRI International
David W. Hermance '70	Honorary Doctor of Engineering	June 2008	Executive Engineer for Advanced Technology Vehicles, Toyota Technical Center, USA
Dr. Russell J. Ebeid '62	Honorary Doctor of Management	July 2008	Former Chairman and President, Guardian Glass Group, Guardian Industries
Michael M. Wood	Honorary Doctor of Humane Letters	June 2009	Former U.S. Ambassador to Sweden and Chair, Redwood Investments, LLC
Marissa T. Peterson '83	Honorary Doctor of Management	July 2009	President and CEO, Mission Peak Executive Consulting
Henry Juszkiewicz '76	Honorary Doctor of Management	December 2009	Chairman and CEO of Gibson Guitar
Stanford R. Ovshinsky	Honorary Doctor of Engineering	December 2010	Deceased, Noted Inventor, scientist, and entrepreneur
Senator Carl Levin	Honorary Doctor of Humane Letters	June 2011	Former United States Senator
Robert C. Kagle '78	Honorary Doctor of Engineering	June 2013	General Partner and Co-Founder Benchmark Capital
David Kenny '84	Honorary Doctor of Management	June 2014	The Weather Company
Rodney O'Neal '76	Honorary Doctor of Engineering	June 2015	Retired CEO, Delphi
Sonia Syngal '93	Honorary Doctor of Management	June 2017	Global President and CEO for Old Navy
Latondra Newton ’91	Honorary Doctor of Management	June 2018	Senior Vice President and Chief Diversity Officer of The Walt Disney Company
Brady Ericson ’94	Honorary Doctor of Engineering	June 2022	Vice President of BorgWarner Inc. and President and General Manager of Fuel Systems and Aftermarket
Paul Bascobert '87	Honorary Doctor of Business Administration	June 2023	President of Reuters
Sean McBurney '03	Honorary Doctor of Business Administration	June 2024	Regional President at Caesars Entertainment, Inc.
Frank Perna, Jr. ‘61	Honorary Doctor of Engineering	June 2025	Retired CEO, MSC Software
Sherry Ann House ‘94	Honorary Doctor of Business Administration	June 2025	CFO Ford Motor Company

== Board of trustees ==
Name	Occupation
Henio Arcangeli '86	President, Motorsports Group Company, Yamaha Motor Corporation USA
Lizabeth A. Ardisana	CEO, ASG Renaissance
Carla J. Bailo '83	
Jane E. Boon '90	
Walter G. Borst '85	President and CEO, GM Asset Management
Don Chaffin '61	R.G. Snyder Distinguished University Professor (Emeritus), Industrial & Operations Engineering and Biomedical Engineering, University of Michigan
Bruce D. Coventry '75	Vice president, Operations, Electrovaya
Gary L. Cowger '70 (former chair)	Retired group vice president, Global Manufacturing and Labor, General Motors
Jacqueline A. Dedo '84 (secretary)	President, Piston Group
Neil De Koker '67	President & CEO, Original Equipment Suppliers Association
Phillip Dutcher '74	COO, Downtown Naples Campus, NCH Healthcare System
David S. Hoyte '71	President, Transformation Management LLC
Charles F. Kettering III	President, Ridgeleigh Management Company
Jesse Lopez	CEO, BAE Industries Inc.
Robert K. McMahan	President, Kettering University
Michael Mansuetti	President, Robert Bosch LLC, Farmington Hills MI
John Moyer	President, Asahi Kasei Plastics
Cindy Niekamp	Senior vice president, Automotive Coatings, PPG Industries
Chris Nielsen '87	President, Toyota Motor Manufacturing
Jeffrey Owens '78	President, Electronics & Safety, Delphi Corporation
Paul S. Peabody	CIO, Palomar Pomerado Health
Raymond Scott	Senior vice president and president, Global Electrical Power Systems, Lear Corporation
Marjorie Sorge	Executive director, Detroit Regional News Hub
Lyn St. James	Lyn St. James Racing LLC, Lyn St. James Foundation
Randy Stashick	Vice president of Engineering, United Parcel Service
Diana Tremblay '82	Vice president, Manufacturing & Labor Relations, General Motors

== Presidents ==
The following persons have served as president of Kettering University or its predecessors:

No.	President	Term start	Term end	Refs.
1	Albert J. Sobey	1919	1950	
2	Guy R. Cowing	1950	1960	
3	Harold P. Rodes	1960	1976	
4	William B. Cottingham	1976	June 30, 1991	
5	James E.A. John	July 1, 1991	June 30, 2005	
6	Stanley R. Liberty	July 1, 2005	July 31, 2011	
7	Robert K. McMahan	August 1, 2011	present	
