= Tuuri (surname) =

Tuuri is a Finnish-language surname. Notable people with the surname include:

- Antti Tuuri (born 1944), Finnish writer
- Arthur L. Tuuri (1920–1996), American pediatrician
- Helena Tuuri, Finnish diplomat
- Heta Tuuri (born 1995), Finnish high jumper
- Joacim Tuuri (born 1989), Finnish footballer
