= Hermance (name) =

Hermance is a given name and surname. Notable people with the name include:

== Given name ==
- Hermance Edan (1851–1934), French designer and publisher of board games
- Hermance Lesguillon (1800–1882), French poet and novelist

== Surname ==
- David Hermance (1947–2006), American automotive engineer
- Vincent Hermance (born 1984), French mountain bike trials cyclist
