= Atwood Stadium =

Stadium in the United States

- "The Beautiful Stadium of Ours"
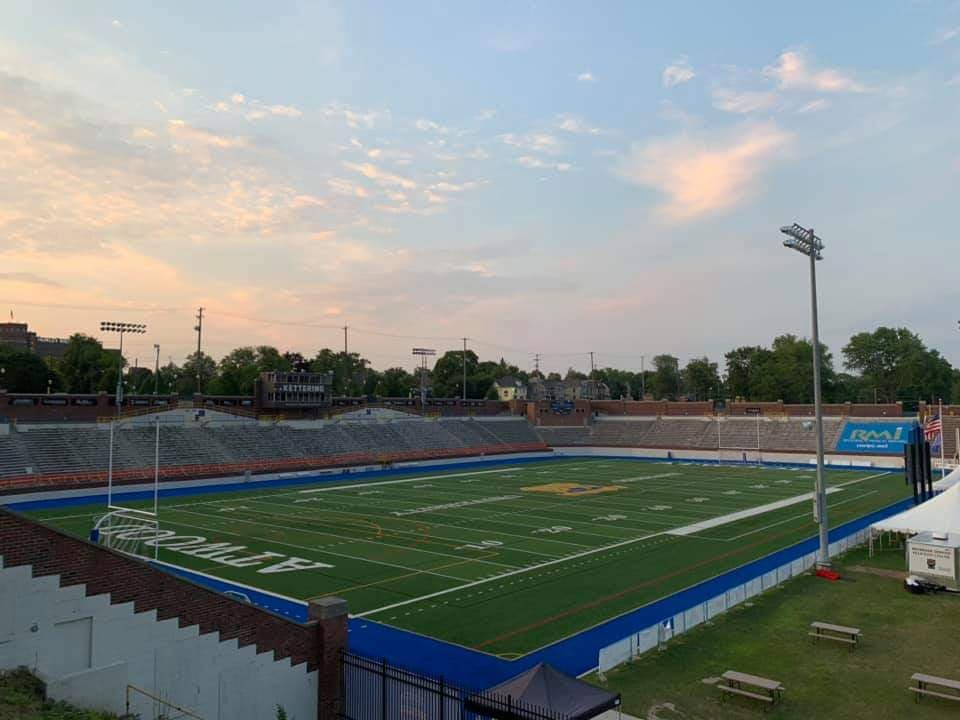
- Atwood Stadium in 2019
- Interactive map of Atwood Stadium
- Address: 701 University Ave.
- Location: Flint, Michigan
- Owner: Kettering University
- Seating type: Bleacher
- Capacity: 11,000
- Surface: Grass (1929-1968); AstroTurf (1968-2014); FieldTurf (2015–present)
- Public transit: MTA Flint Rte. #4 Civic Park (University at Begole or University at Prospect)

Construction
- Groundbreaking: 1928
- Built: 1929
- Renovated: 1995, 2015
- Closed: 1992-1995
- Cost: $100,000 (1929) $3.5 million (1995 renovation) $2 million+ (2015 renovation)

Tenants
- Flint Arrows (CL) 1948–1951; U of M Flint Kodiaks (NCFA) 2010–2017; Flint City Bucks (USL2) 2019–present Powers Catholic High School 2019–present

Website
- www.kettering.edu/about/atwood-stadium

Atwood Stadium is an 11,000-seat stadium owned by Kettering University. It is located in the historic Carriage Town district area of downtown Flint, Michigan. In 2019 it became the home field for the Flint City Bucks, a soccer club that competes in USL League Two, as well as Powers Catholic High School. The annual Vehicle City Gridiron Classic also opens the high school football season at Atwood Stadium, with six to eight teams competing each season. The Flint Institute of Music hosts an annual Independence Day concert in the stadium, which is coordinated with Flint's fireworks display, which is launched from the Chevy Commons park, located to the south immediately across the Flint River from the stadium.

The stadium was named after Edwin W. Atwood, who was elected as the Mayor of the City of Flint in 1920, and also donated a portion of the site for the stadium. It has hosted boxing matches, UAW strikes, high school football, minor-league baseball, election stump speeches, and concerts over the years. Originally Atwood Stadium had a natural grass field, but in 1968 began using artificial turf. Atwood's turf was ruled unsafe, leading to the stadium's closure in 1992. The stadium reopened in 1995 after $3.5 million in improvements, including a new artificial turf field, and resumed hosting football games for Flint Community Schools.

Kettering University received ownership after Flint Emergency Manager Mike Brown ordered the city to transfer ownership in 2013, with the university undertaking the cost of emergency repairs to permit the stadium to continue operation. In 2015 the stadium underwent over $2 million in renovations to the restrooms, press box, concourse, exterior and playing field, and hosted Powers Catholic, Flint Southwestern and Flint Northwestern high school football in the fall of 2015. The new FieldTurf surface has permanent lines for regulation high school football, soccer, and lacrosse. The field goal posts are permanently mounted whereas soccer and lacrosse goals are moved into position as needed. As the field goal uprights are not hinged and therefore cannot be tipped back during soccer matches, the uprights are in bounds above the soccer goal.

Since 2019, the Flint City Bucks soccer team and Powers Catholic High School's football, boys and girls soccer, boys and girls lacrosse, and marching band programs share Atwood Stadium as their home field. Kettering University's intramural and recreational sports programs also extensively use the field, however the university has no varsity intercollegiate athletic programs. Perhaps uniquely, Atwood Stadium is a university-owned public stadium which has permanent regulation markings for high school football but no such markings for college football.

The stadium seating surrounds the field on three sides and is open on the south side, allowing spectators to overlook the paved parking area, the Flint River, and Chevy Commons park beyond. A Genesee County park trail runs along the south edge of the Atwood Stadium paved parking lot along the riverside. Kettering University leaves a portion of the paved parking area publicly accessible to allow residents to fish the river.

The stadium received its nickname, "The Beautiful Stadium of Ours," from the River Rats, the original Bucks supporters' group. The group's tradition is to sing about the stadium as they march to every home match.

== History ==
Atwood Stadium opened on June 8, 1929, and was named after Edwin W. Atwood who donated a portion of the site for the stadium.

From 1930 through 1976 the Annual Football game between Flint Central High School & Flint Northern High School was played on Thanksgiving Day and drew attendance in the tens of thousands of people. The 1967 game (Northern won 6-2) between these two schools was dubbed the "Mud Bowl" because of the field being extensively and extremely torn up due to a rigorous high school football season. The 1950 game with Tony Branoff, Leroy Bolden, and Ellis Duckett drew a record crowd of 20,600, thanks to standing room and temporary seating. Due to the development of state playoffs after 1976, the game was no longer held on Thanksgiving Day. Prior to the closure of Flint Central in 2009, Central won the overall series 41-39-1. Only four of the 81 meetings were not held at Atwood. The inaugural meeting in 1928 was held at Dort Field behind Flint Central. The 1929 meeting was held at Viking Field behind the original Flint Northern. Due to the stadium's temporary closure in 1992, the 1993 and 1994 Central-Northern games were held at Guy V. Houston Stadium, located near Flint Northwestern.

President Franklin D. Roosevelt delivered a speech at the stadium in 1936.

The minor league baseball Flint Arrows played at the stadium from 1948 to 1951. The Arrows were a Class A affiliate of the Detroit Tigers.

Atwood Stadium was renovated in 1966 with new ticket booths, a larger press box, improved lighting and new sod. The renovation also made Atwood an exclusive football stadium. After the sod failed the following year, Astroturf was installed in 1968.

The homecoming concert of American Idol Contestant LaKisha Jones was held here on June 9, 2007. More recently, it hosted a homecoming tribute to 2009 Heisman Trophy winner and Flint Southwestern Academy graduate Mark Ingram, Jr.

City of Flint Emergency Manager Mike Brown signed over ownership of Atwood Stadium in 2013 to Kettering University.

In the past Atwood Stadium hosted the Michigan Invitational Tournament, a high school marching band competition hosted by Flushing High School, which at the time was one of the longest-running marching band competitions in Michigan.

Atwood was home to the annual season opening game between Flint Northwestern and Flint Beecher. Beecher was coached by former NFL player Courtney Hawkins, while Northwestern also had a famous alum as a coach, former NFL wide receiver Andre Rison. Beecher won the 2010 opener, 28-18, while Northwestern took the 2011 opener, 46-44, in double overtime. During odd-numbered years, it has also been the site of Powers Catholic's football game against Nouvel Catholic Central High School; when Powers is the home team, it was usually played at the beginning of the season.

With community gifts from Diplomat Pharmacy, Charles Stewart Mott Foundation and Kettering University in 2015, the university oversaw over $2 million in renovations and improvements to help reopen the stadium in time for the 2015 high school football season. Since then, the Flint high schools have consolidated and no longer use Atwood Stadium as a home stadium. This alleviated scheduling conflicts which occasionally displaced Flint Southwestern home openers to Guy Houston Stadium.

Since 2017, Atwood Stadium has hosted the Vehicle City Gridiron Classic to mark the start of the Michigan high school football season. Six to eight teams participate. Although Powers Catholic had previously played games over several seasons at Atwood Stadium as the home team, the school formally adopted Atwood Stadium as its home field for football, boys and girls soccer, boys and girls lacrosse, and marching band in 2019, using it as the site of competition and practice, although every other year they still open the season with a "home away from home" game at Aagason Field at Holy Redeemer, home of the Bendle High School Tigers in Burton, Michigan, due to the aforementioned Vehicle City Gridiron Classic. Powers Catholic shares the "home of" title with the Flint City Bucks USL League Two soccer team, who also moved to Atwood Stadium in 2019. In their first season in Flint, the Flint City Bucks reached and hosted the USL League Two final, and in front of 7198 fans, won the title with a 1-0 win over Reading United after extra time.

In April 2020, Kettering University partnered with Hurley Medical Center to allow the hospital to set up a drive through COVID-19 testing clinic at the stadium, which is located one block south of the hospital.

== Road Races ==
The Atwood Stadium Races, formerly the Tuuri, is set of road races, kid's dash, 5K and 10K, that begin and end at the stadium and hosted by the Crim Fitness Foundation in partnership with Kettering University. The races are typically held on the fourth Saturday in July. It is an official Crim Training Program voucher race and is known as a training race for the Crim. Racers can choose to run the "duo", both races.

The Tuuri 10K road race, named after Flint pediatrician Arthur L. Tuuri, began in 1979. The first four years, the winners won with sub-30-minute times. In 1981, Greg Meyer, a Michigan native, set the record of 29:28. In 1991, the race had its peak number of finishers with 1,176. In 2010, the Hurley Foundation ran its last Tuuri road race despite it being one of top Flint area races with 856 runners in 2010.

A committee of runners led by Brian and Dorie Barkey attempt to have the Tuuri race be continued by Hurley or picked up by the Crim Fitness Foundation. Instead the committee staged the races in 2011 as the Atwood Stadium Road Races, hoping the nearby Carriage Town Ministries' festival would help the race and vice versa. The 10K and 5K had only changes to it starting and ending at Atwood Stadium. In 2018 and 2019, Kettering University operated the road races with the route being changed taking the runners past Chevy Commons, the Flint River Trail, Mott Park, the Educare Center, Glenwood Cemetery and Kettering's new Mobility Research Center.
