= David Kenny (executive) =

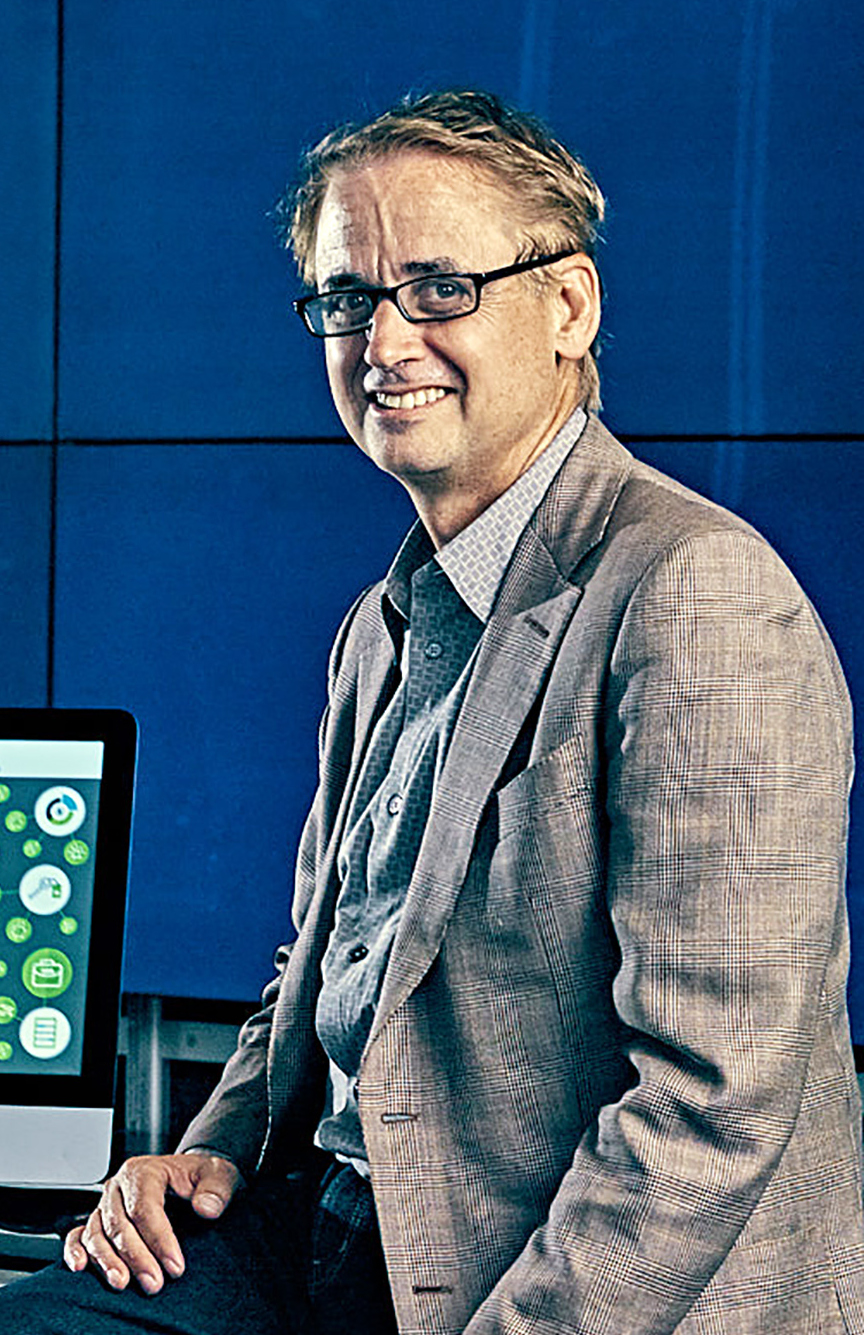
- David Kenny in 2017
- Born: 1961; Lansing, Michigan
- Education: Kettering University; Harvard Business School (MBA)
- Occupation: Businessman
- Known for: former CEO of The Weather Channel, former CEO of Nielsen Company
- Title: Executive chairmain, Nielsen

David Kenny is an American businessman and the former CEO of Nielsen Holdings. He was formerly the CEO of The Weather Company and senior vice president of IBM's Watson & Cloud platform.

== Early life and education ==
Kenny was born in Lansing, Michigan in 1961. He earned a bachelor's degree from Kettering University (then the General Motors Institute) in 1984 and an MBA from Harvard Business School in 1986.

== Career ==
Kenny worked as a consultant at Bain & Company between 1987 and 1997. In 1997 he became the CEO of Digitas, leading the company through an initial public offering in 2000 and its acquisition by Publicis Groupe in 2007. He was the president of Akamai Technologies and resigned from this position on October 26, 2011.

In January 2012, Kenny replaced Mike Kelly as CEO of The Weather Company and served as chairman of the board. When The Weather Company was acquired by IBM in 2016, Kenny became the senior Vice President of IBM's Watson & Cloud platform.

Kenny joined Nielsen as CEO in December 2018. In September 2023, he was succeeded by Karthik Rao and assumed the role of executive chairman.
