= Arthur L. Tuuri =

American pediatrician (1920–1996)

Arthur L. Tuuri (April 25, 1920 – January 29, 1996) was a pediatrician. Tuuri studied at the medical school of the University of Michigan in the early 1940s.

He came to Flint, Michigan in 1948 to work at the Mott Children's Health Center. He worked there until he retired in 1985, becoming president emeritus. He also worked with AIDS patients. In 1994, he was awarded an honorary Doctor of Humane Letters from Kettering University. He died in 1996 at age 75.

Named for him in the Flint area:

- Durant-Tuuri-Mott Elementary School
- Hurley Medical Center's Pediatric Wing
- Tuuri Race Day
- Tuuri Place
