= Chevy Commons =

Park in Flint, Michigan

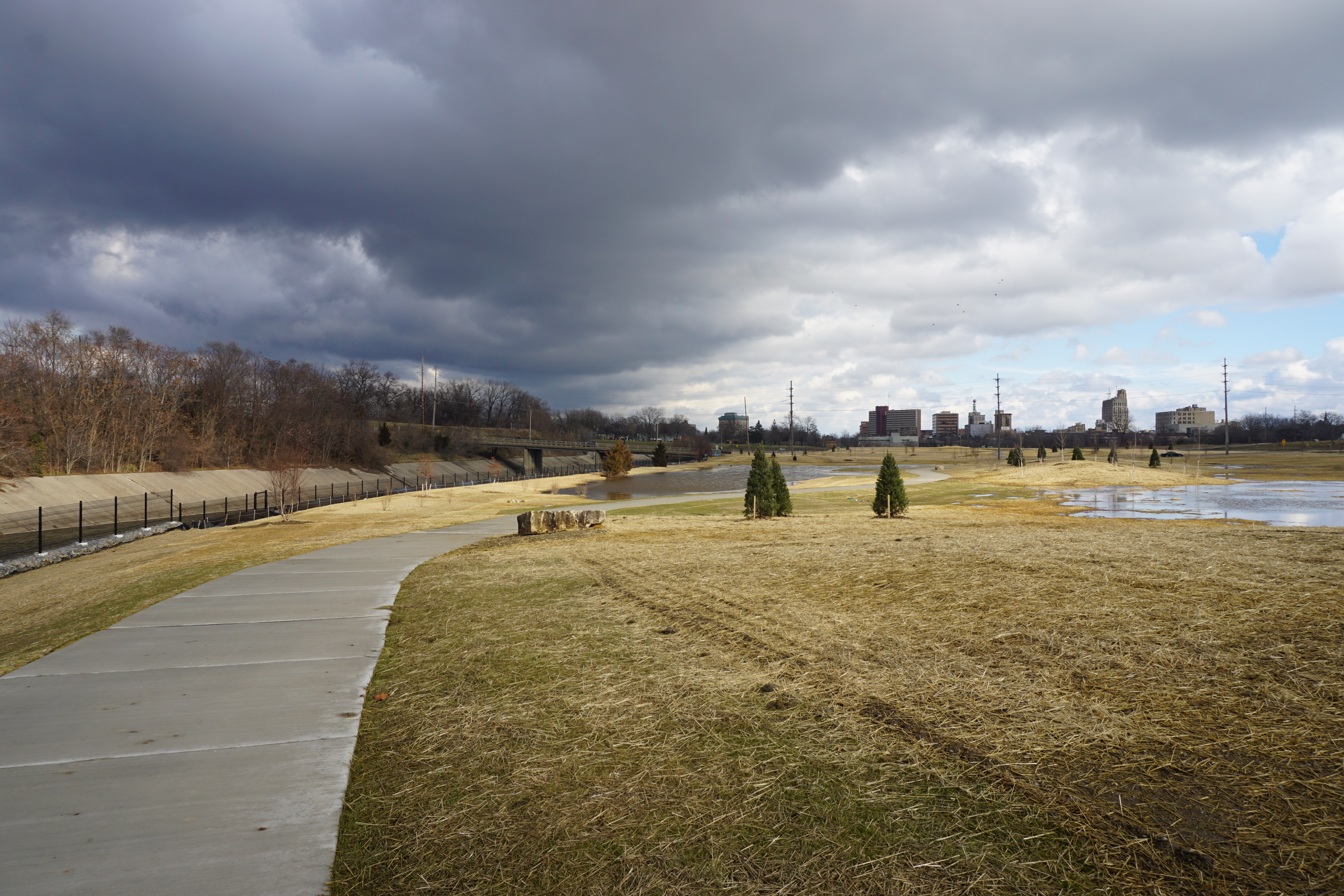
- Chevy Commons in 2018

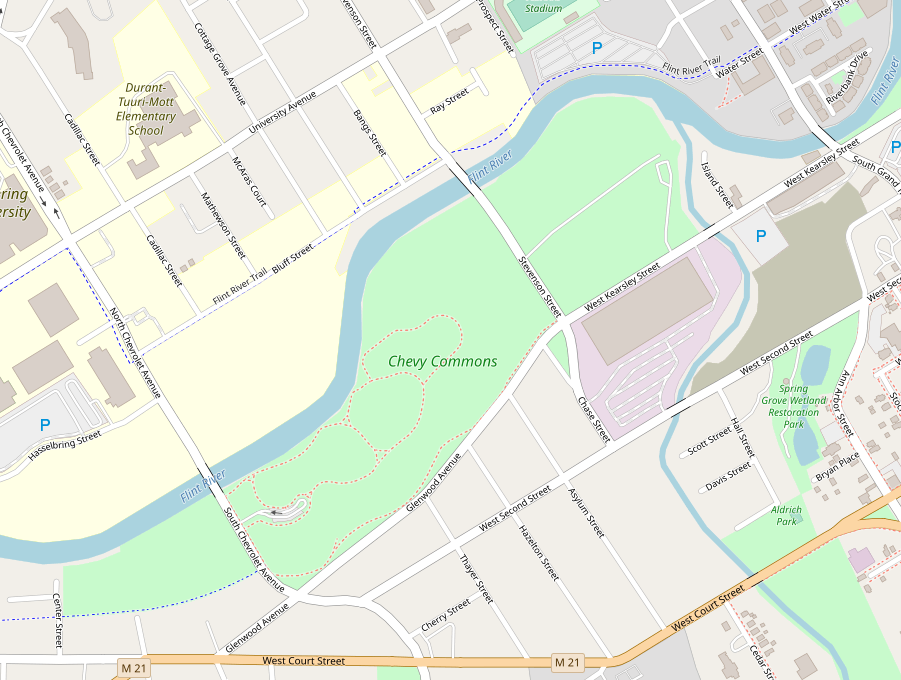
- Map of Chevy Commons
- Type: Public park
- Location: Flint, Michigan
- Coordinates: 43°00′44″N 83°42′17″W
- Area: 60 acres (24 ha)
- Created: 2018
- Operator: Genesee County Parks and Recreation Commission
- Status: Open all year
- Website: geneseecountyparks.org

Chevy Commons is a park along the Flint River between Kettering University and downtown Flint, Michigan. Formerly the site of the original Chevrolet factory widely known as "Chevy in the Hole", it has been redeveloped and revitalized since 2015 as event space and recreational areas with restored grasslands, meadows, wetlands, and woodlands. It also features green spaces, low-maintenance native plants, and walking trails. In total, the creation of Chevy Commons is expected to cost approximately $17.3 million, and it is part of a broader, $36.8-million project to change the landscape of the Flint River in Downtown Flint. The state of Michigan has committed to developing the site as a state park.

== History ==
Between downtown and Kettering University along the Flint River in Flint, Michigan, what is now Chevy Commons was the site of a sawmill and a paper mill before becoming the home of Flint Wagon Works in the 1880s. It is better known as the site of a former Chevrolet factory called Chevrolet Flint Manufacturing but widely known as "Chevy in the Hole". Automotive manufacturing at the factory began in 1904, and it employed 14,000 workers at its zenith. It was also the location of the Flint sit-down strike. The last buildings on the site were demolished in 2004 by automotive parts supplier Delphi, leaving it as a brownfield. For numerous years before the idea of Chevy Commons took form in 2014, blight elimination at Chevy in the Hole was considered.

== Redevelopment ==
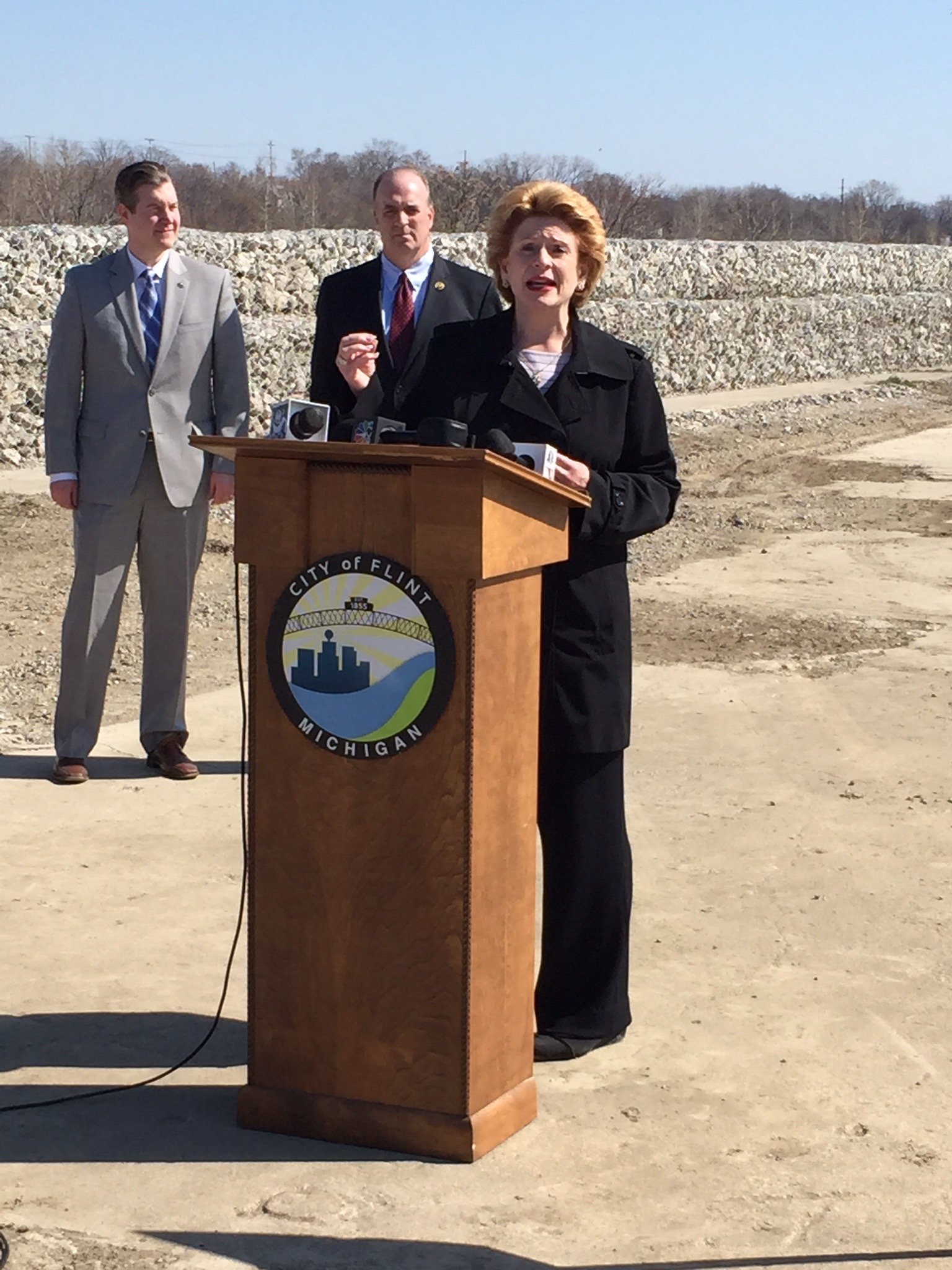
Senator Debbie Stabenow speaking at the Chevy Commons groundbreaking on April 17, 2015

In 2014, Mayor Dayne Walling announced two separate grants (of $1.6 million and $1.9 million, respectively) from the Environmental Protection Agency (EPA) to develop city-owned Chevy in the Hole into a park. Genesee County Historical Society president Dave White noted this represents the first time in almost 200 years that the site is not being used for manufacturing or commercial purposes. According to Walling, Chevy Commons was conceived to provide event space and recreational areas as well as recognize the site's automotive and Native American history. He conceived it as "an interesting, natural space right in the heart of the city".

Christina Kelly, of the Genesee County Land Bank, noted that the project was dependent on federal funds, and that redevelopment of the site planned to focus on capping the ground and building up soil on top of it instead of concentrating primarily on decontamination. Prior to the first EPA grant, however, thousands of trees had been planted on the site to help decontaminate it naturally.

The city and Land Bank conceive of Chevy Commons as a "destination park". On April 10, 2014, approximately 70 people expressed strong support for the project at a public meeting. While the plans for Chevy Commons are outlined in the city's master plan, they also interface with Kettering's master plan, as well as its redevelopment of Atwood Stadium.

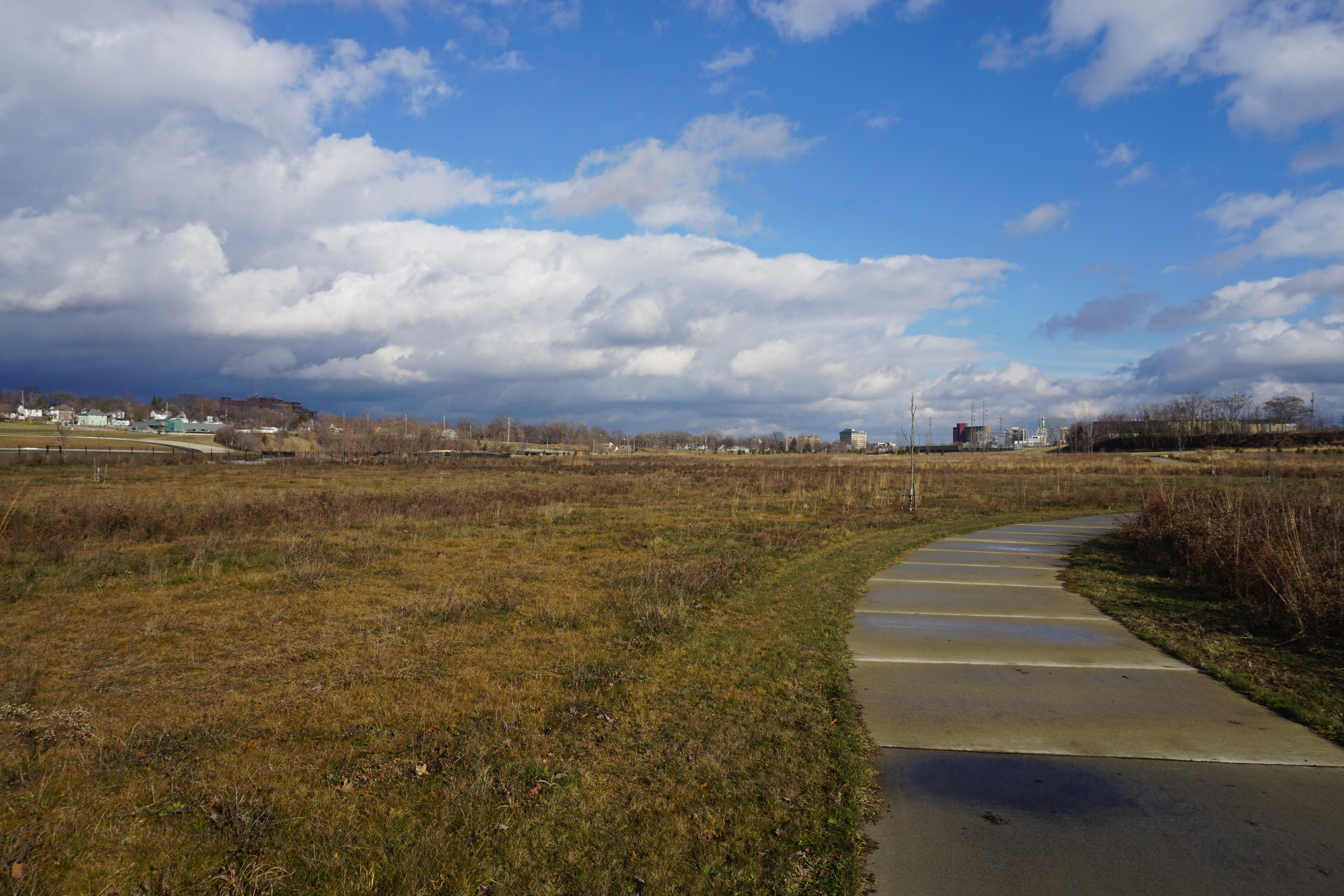
Chevy Commons in 2018

In March 2015, the 60-acre (24 ha) site began a redevelopment and revitalization process that ultimately transformed it into a park, starting with the removal of wire fencing and work on sewer lines. On April 17, the city officially celebrated the start of work on Chevy Commons with a groundbreaking ceremony. The former brownfield was redeveloped into restored grasslands, meadows, and woodlands while walking trails were created on the site. Its design features green spaces, low-maintenance native plants, and wetlands that are intended to control the cost of stormwater management.

The site is being redeveloped in phases, starting with the first phase: planting shrubs, building walking paths, and creating car parking on the southwestern end of the site. The second phase concentrated on connecting the site to county and regional trails, enhancing views of the Flint River, and improving access for fishing. By 2015, millions of dollars had been spent on cleaning up industrial waste on the site, and the next phase of the project commenced: covering the concrete slabs of the site with 2 feet (0.61 m) to 10 feet (3.0 m) of topsoil, a total of 50,000 yards (46,000 m). Folliowing this, grass and trees were planted, and walking trails created. By June 2015, the first phase of construction of Chevy Commons was well underway. By "fortunate coincidence", it also became the trailhead for the Genesee Valley Trail that was constructed to connect it with Flint Township. Also that month, Chevy Commons entered phase two of its construction, as work on building the green cap continued.

On September 24, 2016, Chevy Commons hosted its first event as a finished park: a children's biking event called Cycling Circles. In May 2017, a pedestrian bridge linking Chevy Commons with Carriage Town and connecting two already-existing segments of the statewide Iron Belle Trail was planned. By that point, both the first and second phases of the project had been completed, with additional third and fourth phases planned as part of the broader Riverfront Restoration Project, which endeavors to naturalize the Flint River and make it more accessible, safer, and easier to use for recreation. The third phase concerns 9 acres (3.6 ha) of land along Kearsley Street (between Swartz Creek and Stevenson Street) and was expected to be completed by the end of 2017; the fourth phase deals with greening the area along the river on both sides of Stevenson Street in 2018. In total, the creation of Chevy Commons is expected to cost approximately $17.3 million.

By July 2018, the third phase was complete, and the first three phases were open to the public. At that time, the fourth phase was expected to be complete by October 2018, at which point leftover funds and a $315,000 grant from the Michigan Department of Environmental Quality will be used to start work on the fifth and final phase. The fifth phase will feature additional walking trails, a parking lot, and possibly also a sledding hill.

In 2021, the state announced plans to develop the site as the county's first state park.

== Related developments ==
Chevy Commons is part of a broader, $36.8-million project to change the landscape of the Flint River in Downtown Flint that also includes removing the Hamilton Dam, greening Riverbank Park, and naturalizing the river by softening it with native plants and rocks. Led by Genesee County Parks and the Michigan Department of Natural Resources, the project began in summer 2017 and is tentatively expected to be complete by 2019. An additional 20-acre (8.1 ha) brownfield that was previously part of Chevy in the Hole is being redeveloped into automotive proving grounds, including for autonomous vehicles, by Kettering University and General Motors.
