= WKUF-LP =

- Flint, Michigan; United States
- Broadcast area: Flint, Michigan
- Frequency: 94.3 MHz

Programming
- Format: Variety; Campus radio student station

Ownership
- Owner: Kettering University

History
- First air date: November 19, 2004
- Former call signs: WGMI (unlicensed); KRIB (unlicensed)
- Former frequencies: 530 AM, 96.7 FM
- Call sign meaning: Kettering University Flint

Technical information
- Licensing authority: FCC
- Facility ID: 125734
- Class: L1
- ERP: 100 watts
- HAAT: 29 m (95 ft)
- Transmitter coordinates: 43°00′52″N 83°42′50″W

Links
- Public license information: LMS
- Webcast: www.reverbnation.com/venue/wkuflpradio943fm
- Website: www.wkuf.fm

WKUF-LP (94.3 FM) is a student-run low-power campus radio station located in Flint, Michigan. It broadcasts at 100 watts. It is operated by Kettering University, formerly the General Motors Institute (GMI). It is paid for by student activity fees and a special fund created by the university.

== History ==
=== Early broadcasts ===
Radio has a long history at Kettering University. In the early 1970s an unlicensed "carrier current" radio station operated with the call letters "KRIB". The station was managed by GMI student Lewis Middaugh and Friday late-evening DJ, the late Johnnie Heiman (Dr. J). "Dr. J" moved from an Indiana nut farm to the "big city" Flint when he attended GMI. KRIB helped start him off on a very successful radio career until his death in a farming accident. KRIB was ahead of its time in the radio world. The Glett-Albanese wind-down hour, a Friday evening regular show, was one of the first "dueling DJ" spots in the nation. The show had a dedicated following and this broadcasting technique caught on across the nation. This continued until in the early 1980s, when the current student media club was formed, calling itself WGMI. The WGMI AM broadcasts were only available in the dorms, which meant that WGMI did not require any government licensing. The station, however, declined as AM broadcasts lost popularity. By 1997 there were no more broadcasts from WGMI AM 530. Despite this, there was still enough student interest to keep the radio media group alive.

=== WKUS Student Club ===
When GMI became Kettering University in 1998, the club updated its name to WKUS (Kettering University Station), and interest in a more official radio broadcast grew. Believing that Kettering should have a radio station due to its inevitable positive impacts on the university, WKUS made it one of their main goals to bring such a broadcast to campus. In effort to prepare for a radio station, a small broadcast booth was created in BJ's Lounge, and students began to pursue official licensing.

Low-power FM was introduced to the public for the first time by the Federal Communications Commission (FCC) in January 2000. Club presidents Cortny Robison and Noelle Surprenant played an important role in filing the original FCC application in September 2000 for an LPFM building permit at a broadcast frequency of 96.7 MHz. The application, however, was held up because of a frequency adjacency issue with existing radio stations. Without a clear opportunity to amend the application, hopes for an FM radio station were put in limbo.

In order to sustain itself as a student media organization while it awaited the FCC's response, WKUS reinvented itself as a student DJ service. The club promoted itself by instituting a regular Friday DJ Lunch Hour in the Great Court of Kettering's Campus Center. In addition, the club provided DJ services for student organization activities, orientation weekends, homecoming week, Greek open parties, and philanthropy events. WKUS also achieved campus recognition by regularly hosting open mic nights and an annual battle-of-the-bands. A benefit concert for the FM effort was even held at the Flint Local 432.

The club operated this way for about two years, while this adjacency issue remained unchanged. Eventually, the FCC allowed the station the opportunity to amend the application and then-president Steven Proper took charge of filing the corrected application and preparing for possibility of being awarded a permit-to-build. With the time lapse from the original application, the university's official stance on the project had become unclear and so the club officers set to work on creating a proposal to secure the university's support. Foremost at the club's priorities was creating a contingency plan to raise approximately $50,000 for the construction of the tower and broadcast equipment.

Work intensified when the club received notice that the FCC reviewed the amended application and had granted the university a permit-to-build. Faced with a fast approaching deadline, the student officers worked closely with Diane Vyvyan, the club's advisor, and a steering committee to secure station space, design the broadcasting rig, and create an entirely new infrastructure for the club. After many presentations and meetings with the university's leadership, the station was generously supported financially by Dr. Patrick Deese, the Dean of Student Affairs, and the Kettering Student Government (KSG).

The station's construction was finished just before the deadline specified by the permit-to-build. The most visible portion of the station, the antenna tower, was erected on November 14, 2004 behind the Academic Building (original plans called for the antenna to be located on a lamp post in the athletic fields or on top of the campus center). As the station applied for an official call sign from the FCC, it was discovered that the letters WKUS, which had been associated with the LPFM effort were unavailable. The station leadership decided to instead apply for WKUF, which they envisioned standing for "Kettering University and Flint", suggesting the station's mission to be a voice for both the university and the Flint community. The "LP" suffix denotes the low power nature of the station.

The selection and acquisition of broadcast equipment was overseen by David Blankenship, the club's vice-president (station engineer) and Dr. James McLaughlin from Kettering's Electrical Engineering department designed the station's antenna. Because of the time constraints surrounding the station's construction, the University hired a dedicated co-op student, Alan Delos Santos, to work on the station.

On November 19, 2004 at 12:30 PM, WKUF-LP officially kicked off its broadcast with then-president Scott Porter giving a speech over the airwaves. As the speech was being read in the broadcast studio, a radio receiver was set up in the Great Court for all to hear. Steve Proper, who had originally prepared for the creation of the station, spoke as did Melverne Mills Jr., the Program Director and Steve Schwartz. Finally, Alan Delos Santos introducing the first official song broadcast by the station, "Video Killed the Radio Star" by The Buggles (a reference to the inaugural broadcast of MTV).

In addition to TV12, the Flint Journal and The Uncommon Sense stopped by to cover the official opening of the station. TV5 also stopped by before the official first broadcast to see the station.
