= Rodney O'Neal =

American business executive

- Born: Rodney O'Neal; Dayton, Ohio
- Occupation: Chief executive officer
- Employer: Delphi
- Relatives: Stanley O'Neal (cousin)

Rodney O'Neal is an American businessman. He served as the president and chief executive officer of Delphi Automotive.

== Biography ==
Rodney O'Neal was born in Dayton, Ohio to parents who stressed the importance of education very early on. In his early years, he delivered The Dayton Daily News, and at 13, was named newspaper delivery boy of the year. He later worked in the newspaper's circulation department until he left for college.

=== Early life ===
He graduated from the General Motors Institute, now Kettering University, and received a Master's degree from Stanford University.

=== Career ===
He joined General Motors in 1976 as a production engineer, making steering wheels. A year later, he was promoted to front line supervisor. Over the course of the next several years, he would hold a number of engineering, production and manufacturing positions in locations throughout the United States, Portugal and Canada. In 1997, he became vice president of General Motors and general manager of Delphi Interior Systems. In 1998, when Delphi became an independent company, he became vice president. Since 2007, he has served as president and CEO.

In November 2011, O'Neal rang the bell at the New York Stock Exchange to mark Delphi's initial public offering.

He sits on the board of directors of Delphi and Sprint Nextel. He is also a board member of the Michigan Manufacturers Association and Woodward, Inc. He formerly served on the board of directors of the Goodyear Tire and Rubber Company.

He is a member of the Executive Leadership Council, an organization which supports African-Americans in leadership positions in business, education, or the community. He also sits on the board of Inroads, an organization which aims to offer internships in the corporate world to ethnic minorities. He sits on the advisory board of Focus: HOPE, a Detroit-based organization which tackles racism and poverty.

In 2015 he was named to the 75th class of the Automotive Hall of Fame.

== Personal ==
His cousin is Stan O'Neal, the former chairman and CEO of Merrill Lynch.
