= Qasar Younis =

Pakistani-American businessman

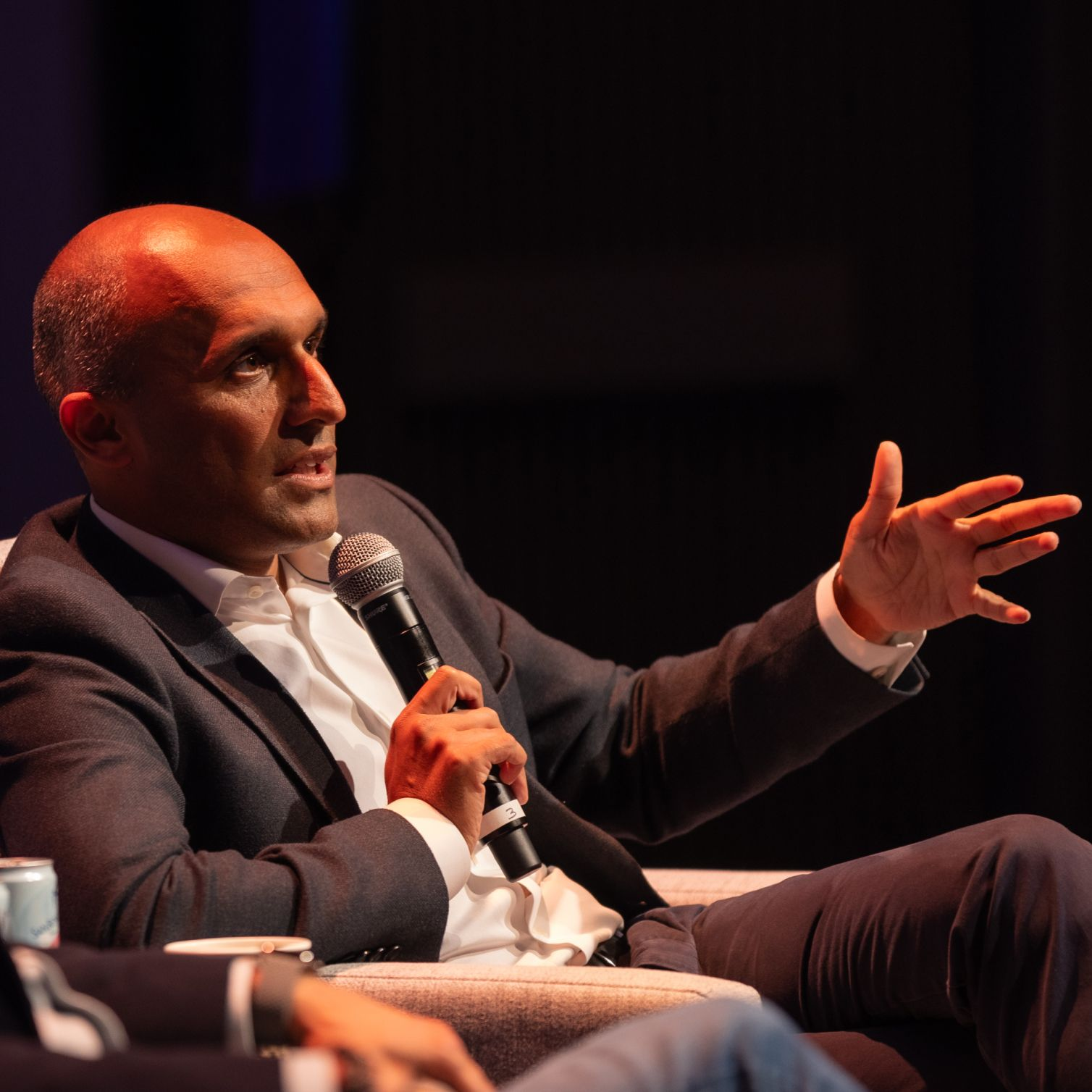
- Born: 1982 (age 43–44); Punjab, Pakistan
- Education: Kettering University (BS); Harvard University (MBA)
- Known for: Applied Intuition, Y Combinator, Google
- Title: CEO of Applied Intuition
- Website: qy.co

Qasar Younis (born 1982) is a Pakistani American businessman and venture capitalist who is the CEO and co-founder of Applied Intuition. Prior to Applied Intuition, he was the COO of Y Combinator from 2015 to 2017. He was also the co-founder and CEO of Talkbin (acquired by Google).

== Early life and education ==
Younis was born on a farm in Punjab, Pakistan, and emigrated to the United States in 1988. He grew up in the Detroit area. While studying engineering at Kettering University in Flint, Michigan (formerly General Motors Institute), he spent time working across General Motors tech centers and factories. He then went on to complete his MBA at Harvard Business School.

== Career ==
Younis started his career as an engineer at General Motors and then Bosch in Japan. After completing his MBA at Harvard Business School, he launched Cameesa in 2007, a consumer crowdfunding startup. In 2010, he moved to the San Francisco Bay Area to start his second startup, TalkBin, a customer feedback app used by retailers such as Crate & Barrel. The company graduated from Y Combinator and was acquired by Google in 2011. After the acquisition, Younis joined Google for 3.5 years as a product lead on Google Maps.

=== Y Combinator ===
After the TalkBin acquisition, Younis continued advising other startups, particularly through Y Combinator. In early 2013, he became a part-time partner at YC. In early 2014, he became a partner at Y Combinator. In 2015 he was promoted to COO.

In his time at Y Combinator, the firm invested in OpenAI, Cruise, Scale AI, DoorDash, GitLab, Coinbase, Flexport, Checkr, and others. He also helped start and create some of the most important initiatives inside the accelerator including raising the $700 million Continuity Fund, starting the software team, and creating Investor Day.

=== Applied Intuition ===
In January 2017, Younis started Applied Intuition, along with co-founder Peter Ludwig, a former Google product manager and software engineer who graduated in engineering from the University of Michigan. Marc Andreessen joined also as a board member in 2017.

Applied Intuition develops software platforms and simulation tools for physical AI, aiming to provide a common autonomy stack that can power road vehicles, industrial machines and defense systems, and cites work with 18 of the 20 largest global OEMs, autonomy startups and defense companies to accelerate autonomy programs. Younis has described the company’s approach as building a single autonomous driving software platform that can be adapted across cars, trucks, industrial equipment and defense systems. As of 2025, Applied Intuition employed about 1,300 people working on applications ranging from automotive driver-assistance features to military vehicles and robotics.

Applied Intuition is currently valued at $15 billion following a $600 million Series F and tender offer announced in June 2025. The funding was co-led by BlackRock-managed funds and Kleiner Perkins, with new investors including Franklin Templeton and Qatar Investment Authority. This represents an increase from the company's previous $6 billion valuation in 2024. Investors include Andreessen Horowitz, Fidelity Investments, Lux Capital, General Catalyst, Ray Dalio, Henry Kravis, Mary Meeker, Reid Hoffman, and Mustafa Suleyman.
