= Robert McMahan =

American academic and businessman (born 1961)

Robert K. McMahan
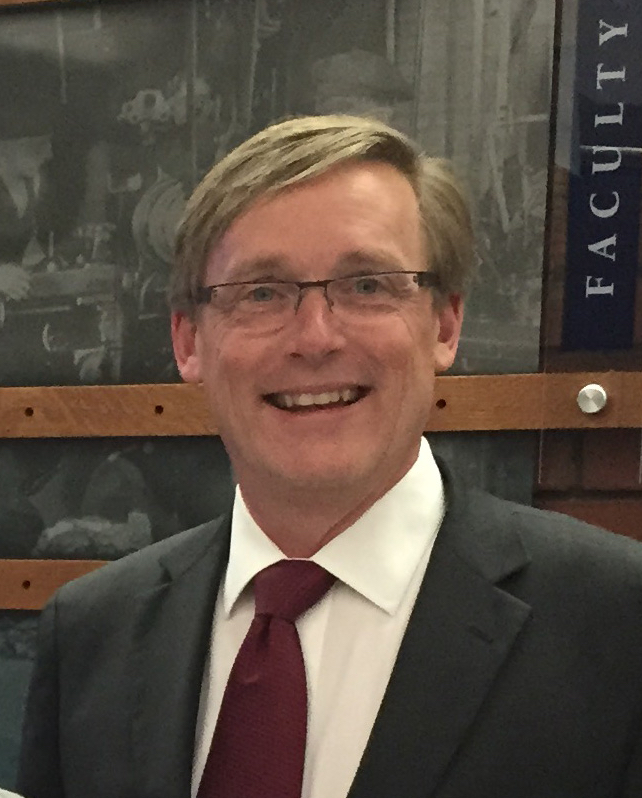
- McMahan in 2017

7th President of Kettering University
- In office August 1, 2011 – Present
- Preceded by: Stanley R. Liberty

Personal details
- Born: 1961 (age 64–65) Florida, United States
- Spouse: Karen Deschamps (m. 1989)
- Children: 2
- Education: Duke University; Dartmouth College
- Profession: Professor of Physics, Academic Administrator
- Institutions: Center for Astrophysics | Harvard & Smithsonian; Dartmouth College; University of North Carolina at Chapel Hill; Western Carolina University; Kettering University
- Website: Kettering University Office of the President
- Scientific career
- Fields: Physics, Astrophysics
- Thesis: Automatic Parameterization and Analysis of Stellar Atmospheres: A Study of the DA White Dwarfs (1986)
- Doctoral advisor: Gary A. Wegner
- Other academic advisors: Margaret Geller

Robert K. McMahan (born 1961) is an American physicist, professor, and entrepreneur who is the seventh and current president of Kettering University.

== Biography and career ==
=== Academic ===
McMahan received undergraduate degrees in physics and the history of art from Duke University in 1982 and a Ph.D. in physics from Dartmouth in 1986 under Gary Wegner. After a postdoctoral appointment at the Center for Astrophysics | Harvard & Smithsonian under Margaret Geller (1986-1989), and while also engaged in a number of corporate and public sector roles (see Corporate and Public below), he served as a research professor of physics and astronomy at the University of North Carolina at Chapel Hill from 1989-2008 as well as a visiting scholar at Oxford University and the University of Durham (UK). He joined Western Carolina University in 2008 as the founding dean of the Kimmel School and Professor of Engineering prior to becoming the seventh president of Kettering University in 2011, where he also holds an appointment as a tenured professor of physics.

McMahan is known for computational modeling and observational work in white dwarf stars early in his career, then later for work in cosmology and extragalactic astronomy. As a graduate student he was involved with the Seven Samurai research group that postulated the existence of the Great Attractor. This effort resulted in the development of a methodology of estimating the distance to galaxies which, when applied, has become one of the most reliable ways to measure the total mass density of the universe. As a postdoc at the Center for Astrophysics | Harvard & Smithsonian under Margaret Geller he participated in research that resulted in the development of maps of the large-scale structure of the universe, which led to the discovery of the Great Wall.

He was a member of the EFAR project, a detailed study of the peculiar velocity distribution of a large number elliptical-rich galaxy clusters. At the Center for Astrophysics | Harvard & Smithsonian he developed 3D visualization software that was used in the 40-minute film, So Many Galaxies...So Little Time, which was on display at the National Air and Space Museum.

He has published over 50 articles in astronomy and astrophysics, engineering and public policy and holds five US patents.

McMahan assumed the position of president of Kettering University on August 1, 2011.

=== Corporate and public ===
While at the Center for Astrophysics | Harvard & Smithsonian, McMahan founded McMahan Research Laboratories, an applied physics systems research and development firm in Cambridge, Massachusetts in 1988, which relocated to the Research Triangle Park of North Carolina in 1989 and later was acquired in 2000 by Gretag-Macbeth. He then joined In-Q-Tel, a private venture capital organization funded by the CIA, and afterward served as the senior advisor to the governor of North Carolina for science and technology, and the executive director of the North Carolina Board of Science and Technology from 2003-2008 where he led the development of significant state and national innovation, investment capital, and technology based economic development policies and legislation, and was a frequent international speaker on academic entrepreneurship and on the role of universities in economic development.

== Personal ==
McMahan has been married to the former Karen Deschamps, a graduate of McGill University, since 1989. They have two children.

Academic offices
| Preceded by Stanley R. Liberty | Presidents of Kettering University; 1 August 2011 - present | Succeeded by N/A (incumbent) |
