= Stanley O'Neal =

American business executive

Stan O'Neal
- Born: Earnest Stanley O'Neal Jr. October 7, 1951 (age 75); Roanoke, Alabama, United States
- Education: General Motors Institute (B.S.); Harvard Business School (M.B.A)
- Occupations: Business executive and corporate director
- Known for: CEO of Merrill Lynch, 2002–2007
- Spouse: Nancy Garvey
- Children: 2
- Relatives: Rodney O'Neal (cousin)

Earnest Stanley O'Neal (born October 7, 1951) is an American business executive and director on corporate boards. He was chief executive officer of Merrill Lynch from 2002 to 2007 and its chairman from 2003 to 2007, having joined the firm in 1986. He was the first African-American chief executive of a major Wall Street securities firm.

O'Neal left Merrill Lynch in October 2007 after the firm reported substantial mortgage-related losses during the subprime mortgage crisis, owing to its excessive exposure to subprime mortgage-backed securities. Merrill Lynch was acquired by Bank of America the following year.

Since June 2026, he has been chair of Hut 8 Corp. He also is on the boards of Clearway Energy, Element Solutions and ALLETE. O'Neal has been on the board of directors of Alcoa, Arconic, General Motors, and other corporations.

== Early life and education ==
E. Stanley "Stan" O'Neal was born in a Roanoke, Alabama hospital and raised in Wedowee, Alabama. He was the eldest of four children of Earnest O'Neal Sr., a farmer, and Ann Scales, a domestic worker. O'Neal grew up in a wood-frame house on the farm owned by his grandfather, James O'Neal, who died when Stan was five years old. The farm was situated on three hundred acres of mostly pine trees. As a child, he played with his sister, two brothers, and other family members on his grandfather's farm, "picking cotton and corn". He also sold and delivered newspapers.

When O'Neal was 12 years old, his father moved the family to Atlanta for better employment. His father worked on the assembly line at the General Motors (GM) factory in Doraville, Georgia, a suburb of Atlanta. O'Neal attended West Fulton High School.

For college, he enrolled in the General Motors Institute (GMI) (today known as Kettering University), and participated in a work-study program that allowed him to rotate between working at the GM Doraville plant and taking engineering and industrial administration classes at GMI. In 1974, he graduated from GMI with a bachelor's degree in industrial administration, the first person in his family to graduate from college.

After graduation, GM hired him as a supervisor at the Doraville plant. While working at the Doraville plant, O'Neal applied to Harvard Business School (HBS). He was accepted, and offered a GM merit-based scholarship. At HBS, he was one of a few Black students. He was elected vice president of the Afro-American Student Union. In 1978, he graduated with honors from HBS with an MBA in finance.

== Career ==
O'Neal began his career at General Motors. During his tenure at GM, he received several promotions. In 1981, he was appointed director of GM's office in Madrid, Spain and supervised a team of 30 employees.

=== Merrill Lynch ===
In 1986, O'Neal joined Merrill Lynch as director of investment banking. By the early 1990s, he was running Merrill's leveraged finance division.

In 1997, he was named executive vice president and co-head of Global Markets and Investment Banking. In 1998, he was appointed CFO. In 2000, he was appointed president of the U.S. Private Client Group, and oversaw 16,000 brokers in 800 branch offices. He was the first head of the private client group who had not previously been a broker at the firm, and led massive layoffs within the division. In 2001, O'Neal became president of Merrill Lynch at CEO David Komansky's request.

On July 23, 2002, O'Neal was selected as CEO, and then-CEO Komansky left his post two years earlier than planned. O'Neal was the first African-American CEO of a Wall Street firm. In April 2003 O'Neal was made chairman of Merrill Lynch as well, when Komansky resigned from the firm entirely. By August 2003, O'Neal dismissed Thomas H. Patrick, Sr., and Arshad R. Zakaria, two senior executives who had played pivotal roles in his promotion to CEO. O'Neal attempted to get rid of the 'Mother Merrill' culture of job security, arguing that it promoted cronyism instead of merit.

O'Neal wanted to transform Merrill into a trading powerhouse, and to surpass Goldman Sachs and other Wall Street firms. In 2006, he hired Osman Semerci as Global Head of Fixed Income, on the advice of trading and investment banking head Dow Kim and COO Ahmass Fakahany. Semerci continued Merrill's advances into the subprime mortgage-backed collateralized debt obligation (CDO) market, grew the firm's position from $5 to $6 billion worth of exposure to $55 billion in under one year, and fired trader Jeff Kronthal, who warned against too much exposure to CDOs. Merrill was one of the top CDO underwriters, and its executives received huge bonuses based on CDO performance. According to the then-president of Merrill, Greg Fleming, the dismissal of Kronthal in July 2006 was the day the firm's fate was sealed; in Fleming's opinion after Kronthal's firing Merrill was doomed to make the same mistakes as its competitors.

O'Neal was regarded as out of touch as the market changed and Merrill steered towards trouble, as he had "become isolated from his own firm. He had no idea that key risk managers had been pushed aside or that the people he had put in important positions were out of their depth". O'Neal was described as a manager who "had never been the kind of C.E.O. who walked the trading floor", and who was "divorced" from the worsening situation at Merrill Lynch and thus disconnected from the firm's internal decision-making. "At the same time Goldman executives were canceling vacations to deal with the burgeoning subprime crisis, O'Neal was often on the golf course, "playing round after round by himself".

During August and September 2007, as the subprime mortgage crisis swept through the global financial market, Merrill Lynch announced losses of $8 billion. O'Neal finally realized the huge exposure that Merrill had to subprime mortgage-backed CDOs, and that the firm would have to be sold in order to survive. As the crisis worsened, O'Neal made an unauthorized approach to Bank of America and Wachovia Bank about a possible merger, which played a role in his ouster. On October 30, 2007, O'Neal resigned as CEO. He left with a severance package including Merrill stock and options worth $161.5 million on top of the $91.4 million in total compensation he earned in 2006.

=== Later career and directorships ===
CNBC included O'Neal in their list of "Worst American CEOs of All Time" in 2009. A book review published by The New York Times argued that O'Neal was one of the people responsible for the 2008 financial crisis. During the final hearings prior to the firm's merger with Bank of America, numerous people – including a founder's son, Win Smith – laid the blame on O'Neal for the firm's downfall and loss of independence.

In 2011, the Financial Crisis Inquiry Commission (FCIC) recommended that O'Neal be prosecuted for multiple crimes in connection with his activities as CEO of Merrill Lynch during the lead up to the sub-prime crisis. None of the FCIC's recommendations resulted in any individual prosecutions.

On January 18, 2008, O'Neal was named to the board of directors of Alcoa and subsequently was a director of Arconic until 2023. He was on the board of General Motors from 2001 to 2006 and on the board of American Beacon Advisors from 2009 until September 2012.

O'Neal has been a director of Element Solutions, formerly Platform Specialty Products, since 2013 and of Clearway Energy since August 2018. He became a director of U.S. Data Mining Group, also known as US Bitcoin Corp., in 2021 and joined the board of Hut 8 Corp. when the companies merged in November 2023. Hut 8 appointed him chair of its board in June 2026. He also serwes as a director of ALLETE.

== Personal life ==
O'Neal's first marriage ended in divorce, in 1984.

He met his second wife, economist Nancy Garvey, while working at General Motors. They married in 1988 and have two children, twins who were born in 1991. They have a Park Avenue apartment and a vacation home on Martha's Vineyard.

O'Neal is an avid golfer.

== Honors and awards ==
- 1998: Kenneth A. Powell Alumni Award for Professional Achievement, jointly awarded by the African-American Alumni Association and the African-American Student Union at Harvard Business School
- 2000: Corporate Executive of the Year, Black Enterprise
- 2002: Achievement Award, Executive Leadership Council
- 2002: “Most Powerful Black Executive in America”, Fortune
- 2003: “25 Most Powerful People in Business”, Fortune
- 2005: Bank Street Celebration Honoree with Nancy Garvey (his wife), Bank Street College of Education
- 2007: Keynote address, Wharton Economic Summit, Michael L. Tarnopol Dean's Lecture Series, Wharton School

== Other board memberships ==
- advisory board, American Cancer Society,
- advisory board, Bronx Preparatory Charter School
- trustee, Buckley School, New York
- trustee, Catalyst
- trustee, Center for Strategic and International Studies
- member, Harvard Business School Visiting Committee
- director, Lower Manhattan Development Corporation
- director, NASDAQ Stock Exchange
- director, National Urban League
- director, Ronald McDonald House
- director, W. E. B. Du Bois Institute for African and African American Research, Harvard
