= Gary A. Wegner =

American astronomer

Gary Alan Wegner (born Seattle, Washington on December 26, 1944) is an American astronomer, the endowed Leede '49 Professor of Physics and Astronomy at Dartmouth College, and recipient of the Alexander Von Humboldt Prize. Wegner was also a member of a famous group of seven astronomers called the Seven Samurai who, in the 1980s, discovered the location of the Great Attractor. He has co-authored and authored over 320 articles in astronomy and astrophysics.

== Early life ==
Gary Wegner grew up in Washington State and was interested and involved in Astronomy from an early age. His first published work (as a teenager) comprised drawings of the surface of the planet Mercury. As a youth, he constructed a large telescope in his backyard, and received a Westinghouse Science Talent Search award when he was in high school, earning him a trip to Washington D.C.

== Academic work ==
Gary Wegner received his BSc degree from the University of Arizona in 1967, and his PhD degree in Astronomy from the University of Washington in 1971. He is the Margaret Anne and Edward Leede '49 Distinguished Professor at Dartmouth and a recipient of the prestigious Alexander Von Humboldt Prize from the Humboldt Foundation in Germany where he spent time at the Ruhr University. He has also worked at Mount Stromlo Observatory in the Australian Capital Territory, Oxford University, the South African Astronomical Observatory, the University of Delaware, Pennsylvania State University, Kitt Peak National Observatory, and he was director of MDM Observatory from 1991-99. His current work focuses on galaxies and he is also well known for his study of white dwarf stars.

Gary Wegner was a member of a group of astronomers known as the "Seven Samurai" which postulated the existence of the Great Attractor, a huge, diffuse region of material around 250 million light-years away that results in the observed motion of our local galaxies.

== Private life ==
He has been married to Cynthia Kay Wegner since 1966 and has five children and two grandchildren. He is the father of Josef Wegner, professor of Egyptology at the University of Pennsylvania and discoverer of the tomb of pharaoh Woseribre Senebkay.

== Publications ==
Wegner has published over 320 peer-reviewed papers in astronomy. The 10 with the most citations are :

- Schechter, P.L., Bailyn, C.D., Barr, R., Barvainis, R., Decker, C.M., Bernstein, G.M., Blakeslee, J.P., Bus, S.J., Dressler, A., Falco, E.E., Fesen, R.A., Fischer, P., Gebhardt, K., Harmer, D., Hewitt, J.N., Hjorth, J., Hurt, T., Jaunsen, A.O., Mateo, M., Mehlert, D., Richstone, D.O., Sparke, L.S., Thorstensen, J.R., Tonry, J.L., Wegner, G., Willmarth, D.W., Worthey, G. "The quadruple gravitational lens PG 1115+080: Time delays and models" (1997) Astrophysical Journal, 475 (2 PART II), pp. L85-L88. Cited 132 times.
- Giovanelli, R., Haynes, M.P., Herter, T., Vogt, N.P., Wegner, G., Salzer, J.J., Da Costa, L.N., Freudling, W. "The I band Tully-Fisher relation for cluster galaxies: Data presentation" (1997) Astronomical Journal, 113 (1), pp. 22–52. Cited 105 times.
- Giovanelli, R., Haynes, M.P., Herter, T., Vogt, N.P., Da Costa, L.N., Freudling, W., Salzer, J.J., Wegner, G. "The I band Tully-Fisher relation for cluster galaxies: A template relation. Its scatter and bias corrections" (1997) Astronomical Journal, 113 (1), pp. 53–79. Cited 96 times.
- Giovanelli, R., Haynes, M.P., Salzer, J.J., Wegner, G., Da Costa, L.N., Freudling, W. "Extinction in Sc galaxies" (1994) Astronomical Journal, 107 (6), pp. 2036–2054. Cited 88 times.
- Giovanelli, R., Haynes, M.P., Da Costa, L.N., Freudling, W., Salzer, J.J., Wegner, G. "The Tully-Fisher relation and H0" (1997) Astrophysical Journal, 477 (1 PART II), pp. L1-L4. Cited 78 times.
- Bernardi, M., Renzini, A., Da Costa, L.N., Wegner, G., Alonso, M.V., Pellegrini, P.S., Rité, C., Willmer, C.N.A. "Cluster versus field elliptical galaxies and clues on their formation" (1998) Astrophysical Journal, 508 (2 PART II), pp. L143-L146. Cited 76 times.
- McHardy, I.M., Jones, L.R., Merrifield, M.R., Mason, K.O., Newsam, A.M., Abraham, R.G., Dalton, G.B., Carrera, F., Smith, P.J., Rowan-Robinson, M., Wegner, G.A., Ponman, T.J., Lehto, H.J., Branduardi-Raymont, G., Luppino, G.A., Efstathiou, G., Allan, D.J., Quenby, J.J. "The origin of the cosmic soft X-ray background: Optical identification of an extremely deep ROSAT survey" (1998) Monthly Notices of the Royal Astronomical Society, 295 (3), pp. 641–671. Cited 69 times.
- Da Costa, L.N.., Freudling, W., Wegner, G., Giovanelli, R., Haynes, M.P., Salzer, J.J. "The mass distribution in the nearby universe" (1996) Astrophysical Journal, 468 (1 PART II), pp. L5-L8. Cited 62 times.
- Haynes, M.P., Giovanelli, R., Chamaraux, P., Da Costa, L.N., Freudling, W., Salzer, J.J., Wegner, G. "The I-band Tully-Fisher relation for Sc galaxies: 21 Centimeter H I line data" (1999) Astronomical Journal, 117 (5), pp. 2039–2051. Cited 61 times.
- Giovanelli, R., Haynes, M.P., Salzer, J.J., Wegner, G., Da Costa, L.N., Freudling, W. "Dependence on luminosity of photometric properties of disk galaxies: Surface brightness, size, and internal extinction" (1995) Astronomical Journal, 110 (3), pp. 1059–1070. Cited 60 times.
- Geller, M.J., Kurtz, M.J., Wegner, G., Thorstensen, J.R., Fabricant, D.G., Marzke, R.O., Huchra, J.P., Schild, R.E., Falco, E.E. "The century survey: A deeper slice of the universe" (1997) Astronomical Journal, 114 (6), pp. 2205–2211. Cited 59 times.
