= David Hermance =

American automotive engineer

David W. Hermance (September 27, 1947 – November 25, 2006) was an American automotive engineer called the "American father of the Prius." According to Automotive News, he was considered the top American executive for alternative fuel vehicles.

== Early life and education ==
Hermance was born in Logansport, Indiana to Keith Weston Hermance and Margaret "Peg" Johnstone Hermance.

Hermance earned a Bachelor of Science degree in engineering from the General Motors Institute.

== Career ==
Hermance joined General Motors in 1965 and served in a variety of roles in the Vehicle Emissions Laboratory from 1971 to 1985. From 1985 to 1991, he served as department head for durability test development at General Motors. He was a member of the Society of Automotive Engineers.

He joined Toyota Technical Center (TTC) in 1991 as senior manager in engine evaluation, with responsibility for evaluating North American passenger car engines. In 1992, he was promoted to general manager of the Powertrain Department in Gardena, California, where he was responsible for the development of engine and drivetrain calibrations for the North American market. His department tested many experimental designs, including TRW's "Electro-Mechanical Transmission", which became the hybrid electric vehicle.

At the Toyota Technical Center (TTC), Hermance served as executive engineer for advanced technology vehicles, overseeing North American vehicle communication and California emissions regulatory affairs. He earned a reputation as a persuasive speaker who could explain complex hybrid systems to the public and regulators in plain language. Most notably, he convinced Toyota that American drivers would only buy hybrids in large quantities if performance an size remained uncompromised.

Interviewed in 2004, Hermance said his championing of the Prius was environmentally motivated, adding, "I'm convinced global warming is real, and that if we're not principally responsible, we're at least contributing to that."

In July 2006, Hermance testified before the United States House Committee on Government Reform on the topic "Hybrid Cars: Increasing Fuel Efficiency and Reducing Oil Dependence."

== Death ==
Hermance was an avid pilot and flew his Russian Yak-55 aerobatic airplane regularly in aerobatic competition at the Intermediate level. Hermance died on November 25, 2006, while flying an Interavia E-3 off the California coast. Engine failure is not believed to be the cause of the crash.
