= Kettering University =

Private university in Flint, Michigan, US

- Former names: General Motors Institute of Technology, Flint Institute of Technology
- Type: Private university
- Established: 1919; 107 years ago
- Endowment: US$110 million (2021)
- President: Robert McMahan
- Provost: James Zhang
- Faculty: 145
- Students: 2,327
- Undergraduates: 1,905
- Postgraduates: 422
- Location: Flint, Michigan, United States; 43.0125°N 83.7125°W
- Campus: Urban
- Colors: Gold and Blue
- Nickname: Bulldogs
- Mascot: General Determination
- Website: www.kettering.edu
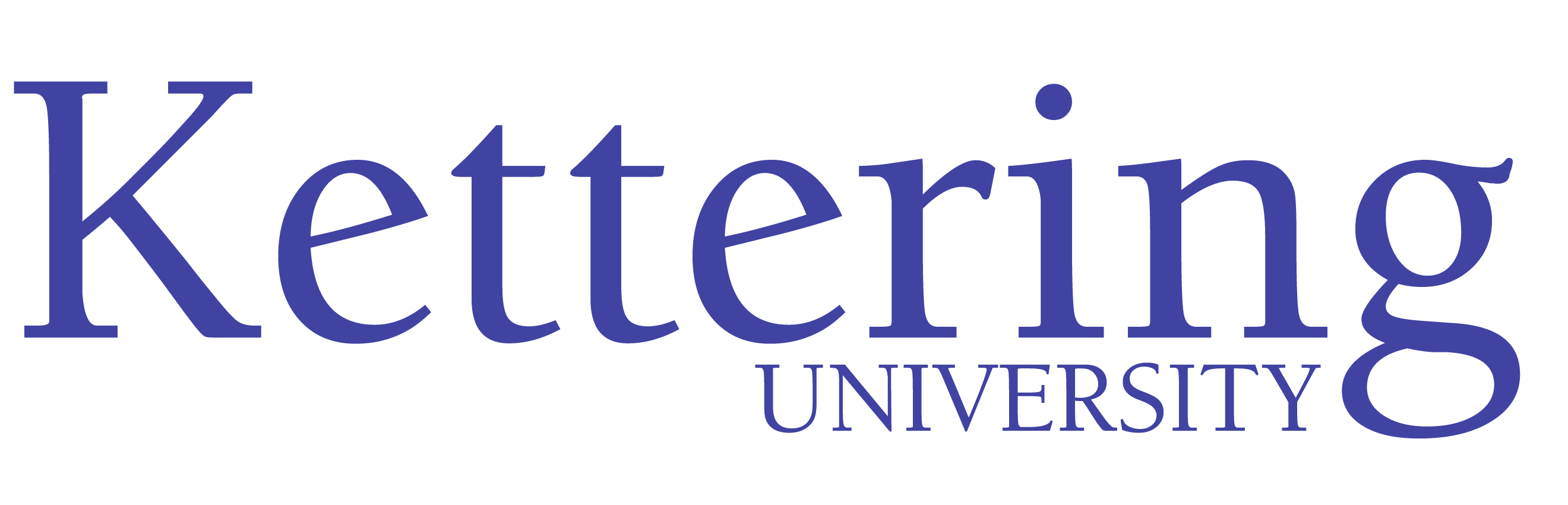

Kettering University is a private university in Flint, Michigan. It offers bachelor of science and master’s degrees in STEM (science, technology, engineering, and mathematics) and business. Kettering University undergraduate students must complete at least five co-op terms to graduate.

Kettering University is named after inventor and former head of research for General Motors, Charles F. Kettering. He was a distinguished inventor, researcher, and proponent of cooperative education.

== History ==
Kettering University
Presidents

Founded as The School of Automotive Trades by Albert Sobey under the direction of the Industrial Fellowship of Flint on October 20, 1919, Kettering University has a long legacy in the automotive industry. The university became known as the Flint Institute of Technology (Flint Tech) in 1923 before being acquired by General Motors in 1926. It was renamed as the General Motors Institute of Technology (General Motors Tech) and eventually the General Motors Institute in 1932.^{[2]}

Once referred to as the "West Point of the Automobile industry," GMI focused on a cooperative education model that combined classroom learning with real-world job experience (following the development of this program at the University of Cincinnati in 1907). GMI also pioneered freshman-level manufacturing courses (Production Processes I & II) and automotive degree specialties. In 1945, the Institute added a fifth-year thesis requirement, granting the school the ability to award degrees. The school's first bachelor's degree was subsequently awarded on August 23, 1946.^{[2]}

During the 1950s, the co-op program required applicants to find a GM division to sponsor them. School and work were mixed in four- or eight-week rotations, dividing the student body into four groups.

=== Split from GM ===
After GM reduced operations in Flint, the company and the university separated on July 1, 1982. The institution became "GMI Engineering & Management Institute," keeping the initials "GMI" to maintain its connection with the old General Motors Institute. The university began charging full tuition as an independent private university. The university kept the cooperative education model, expanding the number of co-op employers for students. The university also began offering graduate programs for both on- and off-campus students.^{[2]}

=== Name change and expansion of programs ===
The university's name was formally changed to Kettering University on January 1, 1998, in honor of Charles Kettering. The name change allowed the university to establish a separate identity from General Motors and to publicize their expansion of academic programs beyond automotive-related offerings.

The university launched a physics program in 1995 and the first ABET-accredited applied physics program in the world in 2013. A chemical engineering program as well as a pre-med course of study were launched in 2008. The chemical engineering program received ABET accreditation in 2013. The computer science program received ABET accreditation in 2007. The university added an applied biology program in 2013.

== Academics ==
Kettering University offers Bachelor of Science (BS) and masters (MS, MBA, MBA/MSMO dual) degree programs. Some masters programs are available online following the school's launch of distance education programs in 2015. Most undergraduate programs require completion of 160 credit hours for graduation. Its most popular undergraduate majors, by 2021 graduates, were:

Mechanical Engineering (233)
Electrical and Electronics Engineering (44)
Computer Science (42)
Computer Engineering (26)
Industrial Engineering (24)
Chemical Engineering (23)

=== Accreditation ===
Kettering University has been accredited by the Higher Learning Commission since 1962. Several of the university's academic programs have specific accreditation as well:

Program-specific accreditations
Program	Accreditor	Initial accreditation
Applied Physics	ABET	2011
Business Administration	ACBSP	1995
Chemical Engineering	ABET	2011
Computer Engineering	ABET	1998
Computer Science	ABET	2007
Electrical Engineering	ABET	1977
Engineering Physics	ABET	2011
Industrial Engineering	ABET	1977
Mechanical Engineering	ABET	1977

=== Rankings ===
Academic rankings

Master's
- Washington Monthly: 228

Regional
- U.S. News & World Report: 26

National
- Forbes: 206
- WSJ/College Pulse: 389

Kettering University ranked 13th nationally among non-Ph.D.-granting engineering universities and seventh nationally among mechanical engineering programs in the 2017 U.S. News & World Report "Best Colleges" edition. The university also received a "Best in the Midwest" designation from the Princeton Review.

Kettering ranked 12th nationally and first in the Midwest and Michigan in Return on Investment in PayScale.com's 2015 Return on Investment Rankings. PayScale.com also ranked Kettering 15th nationally and first in Michigan in its 2014 Salary Potential rankings. A 2015 CNNMoney.com article examining the top private colleges in the country in return on investment ranked Kettering 10th, noting that Kettering's students graduated with skills employers were looking for.

An article in the 2014 issue of Automobile magazine listed Kettering University among five top universities for students aiming to enter the auto industry. The article noted Kettering University's unique program, which prepares students for work and immerses them in it—alternating three months of school with three months of on-the-job experience, repeated until graduation.

=== Research ===
National Science Foundation Major Research Instrumentation (MRI) grants have allowed Kettering to add equipment that includes an X-Ray diffractometer, an X-Ray photoelectron spectroscopy (XPS) instrument, a motion capture system, a High-Throughput and High-Resolution Three-Dimensional Tissue Scanner with Internet-Connected 3D Virtual Microscope for Large-Scale Automated Histology, and - at the time - the only 4G LTE Wireless system on a college campus in the country. Kettering University partners with the federal government's U.S. Ignite program, which brings super high-speed internet capabilities to Flint, Michigan. The technology will bring Flint new healthcare, crime prevention, and educational opportunities. Also, in partnership with the University of Michigan and Michigan State University, Kettering University received a $1 million neighborhood stabilization grant from the United States Department of Justice in 2014.

=== FIRST Robotics ===
Kettering University opened the FIRST Robotics Competition Community Center in 2014. College officials said it was the first integration of a robotics center into a college campus in the country. Michigan Governor Rick Snyder attended the grand opening.

The facility provides work areas for eight FIRST teams, with space to accommodate up to 16 teams. There is also a regulation-size practice field and a machining lab. High school students on teams housed in the facility have access to Kettering University's faculty, staff, and students as mentors and the campus facilities. Approximately 25 percent of Kettering University's student body participated in FIRST Robotics in high school. The facility intends to create more opportunities for pre-college students, particularly students from underserved or financially disadvantaged populations, to gain exposure to science and engineering education and career possibilities. Kettering University also received a National Science Foundation grant in 2014 to provide scholarship to academically talented financially disadvantaged students who participated in high school robotics programs.

=== Cooperative and experiential learning ===
All Kettering University undergraduate students must complete some form of experiential learning for every degree program. Cooperative education begins as early as a student's freshman year. Student schedules typically alternate between academic terms that include classes and labs and full-time employment with one of Kettering's more than 550 partner organizations. Usually, a student maintains employment with the same organization throughout the program.

Cooperative experience is paid, with freshman students earning an average of $14.20 per hour on their co-op terms and upperclassmen earning an average of $18.44 per hour. Ninety-eight percent of Kettering University graduates are employed or accepted into graduate school within six months of graduation.

== Campus ==
Selected locations on Kettering University campus
1 Academic Building
2 Campus Center
3 C.S. Mott Science & Engineering Building
4 Frances Willson Thompson Hall
5 Connie & Jim John Recreation Center
6 McKeachie Pavilion
7 Recreation Fields
8 GM Mobility Research Center
9 Campus Village Apartments
10 Flint Children's Museum
11 Innovation Center
12 Atwood Stadium
13 Learning Commons

Kettering University's campus is situated on approximately 90 acres of land along the Flint River on the west side of Flint. In 2012, Kettering began purchasing distressed properties from the Genesee County Land Bank as part of its mission to play a leading role in the revitalization of Flint. The university demolished blighted structures and took over maintenance, mowing, and upkeep of the properties.

Kettering has received neighborhood stabilization grants from the Department of Justice and Centers for Disease Control and Prevention. These grants aimed to support the revitalization of neighborhoods near campus and establish a safe University Avenue Corridor (UAC), a walkable connector from Kettering's campus to downtown Flint, the University of Michigan–Flint campus, McLaren Regional Medical Center, and Hurley Medical Center.

=== Campus Master Plan ===
In 2014, Kettering University unveiled a new Campus Master Plan.

The plan's first phase of the master plan involved constructing a new mixed-use Learning Commons building to house some academic department functions, a modern library, new food service venues and options, and other resources, including increased access to flexible, technology-enabled, collaborative spaces. The building had space for visiting alums and other campus guests, integrating them into the campus community for the entirety of their visit. The $63 million learning commons facility opened in 2022.

Other phases of the campus master plan include the construction of a new residence hall, new research facilities, and a raised connector across Chevrolet Avenue that pays homage to a bridge that existed when the property was home to the General Motors Chevrolet Division. Additionally, the campus plan aimed to open the campus to better accommodate pre-college students by redeveloping the Academic Building with increased lab and community space.

=== Kettering University General Motors Mobility Research Center ===
In April 2015, Kettering University announced a $2 million naming donation from the General Motors Foundation to construct the Kettering University General Motors Foundation Automotive Research Area. The facility was conceived to be an automotive proving ground on a piece of campus that is the former site of the Chevrolet Division, or Chevy in the Hole. The cost for the project was $4.5 million, and it included construction of the research area on a 19-acre proving ground and an 18-acre brownfield site.

Eventually donning the name GM Mobility Research Center (MRC), the center was completed before 2023 and includes a 21-acre outdoor lab space. The outdoor lab has various areas for testing vehicle safety standards as well as hybrid and electric vehicle technologies. The MRC provides additional classroom and lab experiences for students and expands research opportunities for faculty and industry partners. At the time of its completion, it is the only facility of its kind on a college campus in the United States.

The project complements a major city of Flint project on the opposite side of the Flint River called Chevy Commons. The project converted a Flint-owned portion of Chevy in the Hole into an urban park that includes wetlands, woodlands, grasslands, green spaces, and paved recreation trails.

=== Academic Building ===
Kettering University's Academic Building was the first building constructed on campus and features a prominent arched architectural entrance at the corner of N. Chevrolet Avenue and University Avenue. This front entrance is constructed with stonework and bears the insignia "General Motors Institute of Technology" in stone at the top of the archway. This entrance is featured in Kettering University's seal.

The building currently includes several labs, including a polymer processing lab, an ergonomics lab, a work design Lab, applied biology labs, chemical engineering labs, an advanced power electronics lab, a haptics lab, an acoustics lab, and many other lab spaces. The building also houses McKinnon Theater, the Humanities Art Center, a library, and departmental offices.

=== Campus Center ===
The Campus Center is Kettering University's main administration building. It includes the Office of the President, Student Life, Admissions and Financial Aid, University Advancement and External Relations, Alumni Engagement, Multicultural Student Initiatives, and Sponsored Research.

In addition, the Campus Center houses three food service areas and a student center. Kettering's Campus Safety headquarters are also in the Campus Center. The Lear Corporation funded upgrades for the safety center, which included increased security enforcement and a close-circuit television surveillance system connected to feeds from security cameras throughout the campus.

The Campus Center also provides community space, including facilities for the Michigan Small Business Development Center I-69 Trade Corridor Regional Office, which supports local and regional businesses across multiple counties in Michigan, and classrooms for Oxford Virtual Academy.

=== C.S. Mott Science and Engineering Building ===
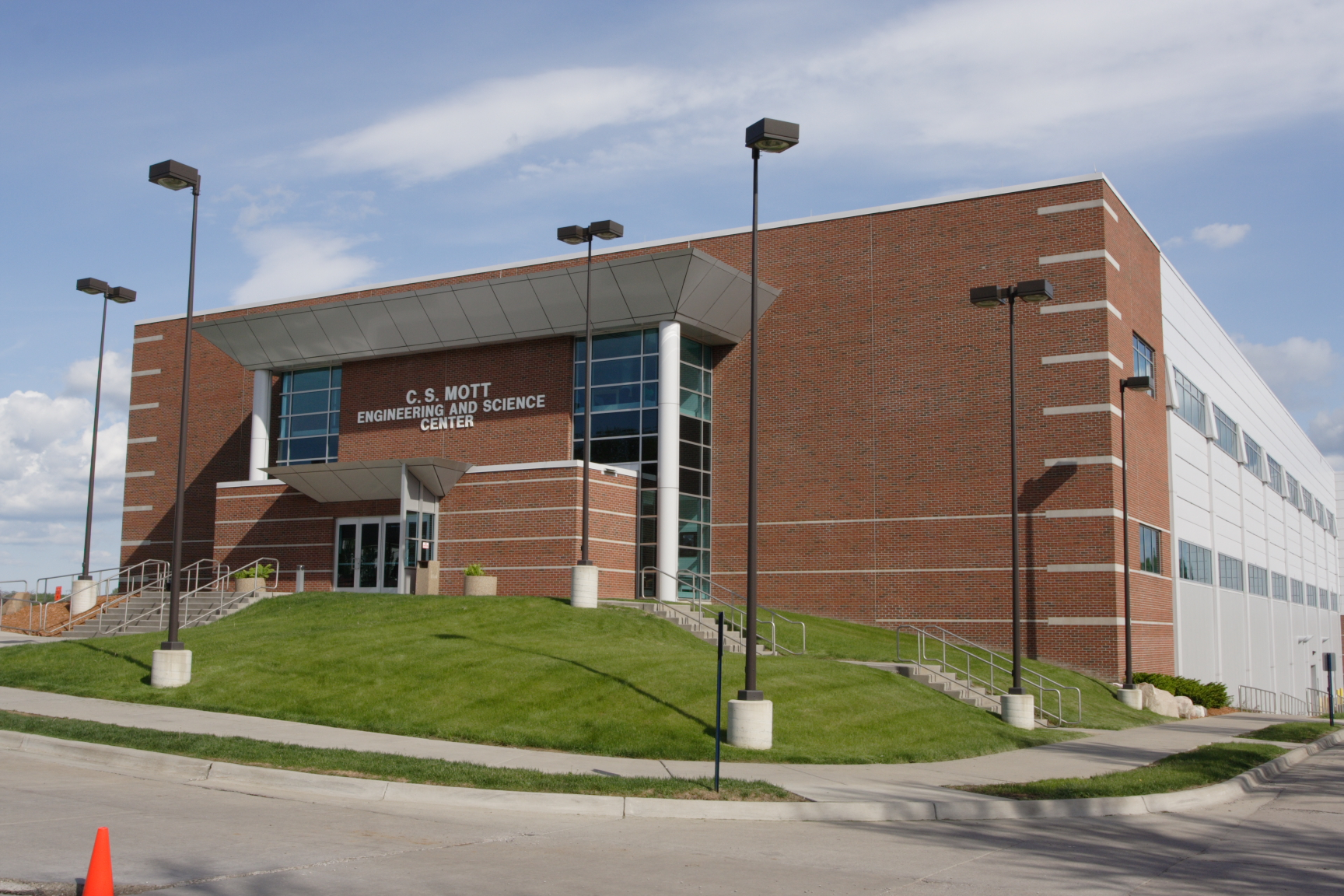
C.S. Mott Engineering and Science Center

The C.S. Mott Science and Engineering Building opened in 2003 and houses departmental offices as well as classroom space for Mechanical Engineering, Chemistry, and Biochemistry. The building includes several labs, including a powertrain lab, Kettering University's Crash Safety Center, a fuel cell lab, bioengineering labs, and other core science and engineering labs for students. The building also houses T-Space, a student-driven lab with activities encouraging an entrepreneurial mindset and access to tools such as 3D printing, laser cutting, and soldering for making electric and mechanical prototypes.

=== Frances Willson Thompson Hall ===
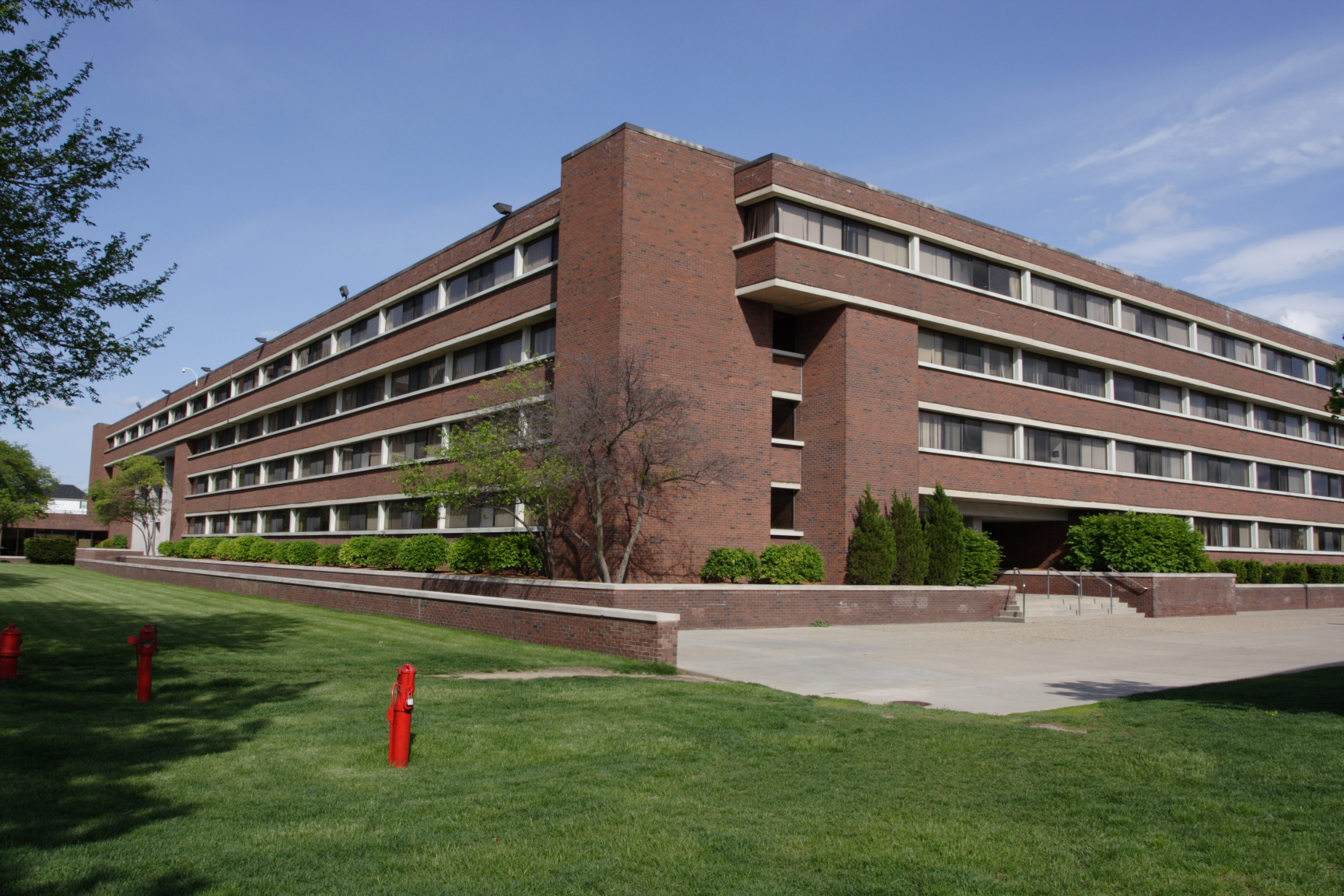
Frances Willson Thompson Hall

Kettering University's residence hall is the sole on-campus student housing facility. All students are required to live in the residence hall during their freshman year.

=== Connie and Jim John Recreation Center ===
Kettering's recreation center opened in 1995 and includes a 25-yard pool, indoor track, tennis, basketball, and racquetball courts, free weights, exercise equipment, an aerobics room, and meeting rooms. Kettering University's commencement ceremonies are typically hosted in the recreation center.

=== Learning Commons ===
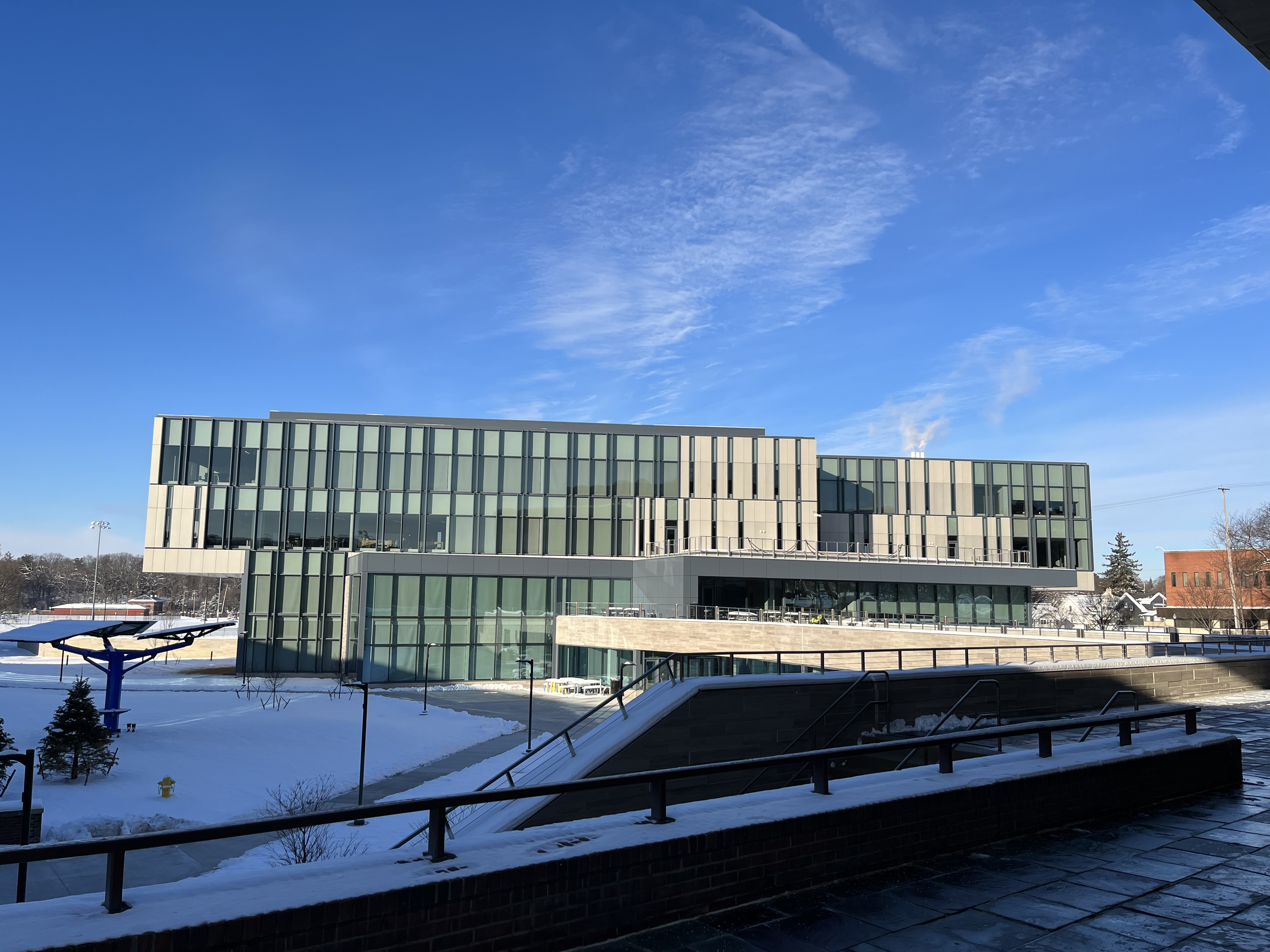
The Learning Commons in January 2023

Completed in 2022 and featuring an open-air atrium at its center, the Learning Commons building is home to a new cafeteria, coffee shop, auditorium, IT service desks, outdoor terraces, rooftop gardens, and over a dozen multi-use spaces for students to use to study and collaborate.

=== Innovation Center ===
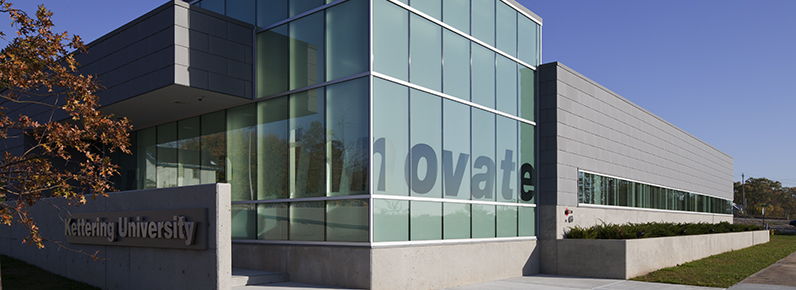
The Innovation Center on Bluff Street at Kettering University

The Innovation Center at Kettering University, a 9,000-square-foot incubator for entrepreneurs, opened in 2010. The Innovation Center was the first Leadership in Energy and Environmental Design (LEED) certified building in Genesee County.

=== Atwood Stadium ===
Kettering University acquired Atwood Stadium, an 11,000-seat stadium that was previously designated a city park, from the city of Flint in 2013. The stadium opened in 1929.

Kettering has made major repairs to the stadium, including fixing masonry work, restrooms, concessions areas, locker rooms, and lighting. in 2015, Kettering University replaced the turf in the stadium with a state-of-the-art field turf, making Atwood one of only three venues in the state of Michigan (the others are Ford Field and Michigan Stadium) with this field surface. With the replacement of the field surface, the field was expanded and lined to support NCAA/MLS soccer and men's and women's lacrosse play in addition to football.

Kettering University has constructed temporary ice rinks in the stadium and offered free open ice skating in the winters of 2014 and 2015.

=== Flint Children's Museum ===
The Flint Children's Museum, located on the campus of Kettering University, offers hands-on experiences for children ages two to ten. The museum features rotating exhibits that change every three months. Exhibit themes include How Things Work, Performing Arts, Health and Fitness, Our Town, and Discovery Zone.

The museum also features an outdoor educational area called Sproutside. The learning area was constructed in 2007 with support from the Ruth Mott Foundation and the Community Foundation of Greater Flint.

== Student life ==
Nearly half of Kettering University's student body lives in the university's residence hall or in the Campus Village Apartments complex adjacent to campus. Many others live near campus in fraternity and sorority housing or private rentals, making the university's campus community close-knit. A variety of activities and organizations give students plenty of social outlets on and near campus.

=== Kettering LEADERS Fellowship ===
In 1999, 31 graduating seniors committed to donating $10,000 each over 10 years to build up an endowment dedicated to student leadership development at Kettering University. Since then, the endowment has grown to over $450,000. The selective program is now known as the Kettering LEADERS Fellowship.

=== SAE Competition Teams ===
Kettering University competes in the Society of Automotive Engineering’s Collegiate Design Series by building competition vehicles to compete in the Baja SAE, Formula SAE, SAE Aero Design, and SAE Clean Snowmobile Challenge competitions. In 2018, Kettering University began competing in the SAE AutoDrive Challenge, in which students convert a Chevrolet Bolt vehicle into a SAE level 4 autonomous vehicle by the 3rd year of competition.

Each year, students design and build vehicles for national and international competitions. In 2015, Kettering's Clean Snowmobile Challenge team finished in the top two at its international competition for the fourth straight year (including a first-place finish in 2014). The Formula SAE team finished fourth out of 100 schools in competition in Brooklyn, Michigan in 2022. Previously, the Formula SAE team finished tenth at its competition in Lincoln, Nebraska in 2014, following a seventh-place finish in 2013.

=== DECA ===
Kettering University has a collegiate DECA team. Kettering students won 13 awards at a state of Michigan competition in 2015 and three awards at the international conference in Washington D.C. in 2014.

=== Model United Nations ===
Kettering University has a student Model United Nations (MUN) team. MUN teams feature students that roleplay as United Nations delegates and simulate United Nations committees at conferences or competitions.

Kettering University's team, which was formed in 2010, won its first-ever prize at an international competition at Model United Nations in the United States in November 2014 and won prizes at Harvard University in 2015 as well.

=== Greek life ===
Greek Life on the Kettering/GMI campus began in 1921. The first officially recognized organization was not formed until 5 years later as the White Elephants. Several other local fraternities would appear on campus during the following years. However, because during this time GMI was not accredited, no national/international recognized fraternities appeared on campus. When GMI did receive accreditation in 1962, the university would require all local fraternities to join a national/international fraternity. Many of the current fraternities on campus came from that transition. Kettering University has an active Greek system.

Many North American Interfraternity Conference (IFC) fraternities have chapters at Kettering as do several National Panhellenic Conference (NPC) sororities. The National Pan-Hellenic Council (NPHC) has several local chapters that are also affiliated with Kettering. IFC, NPC, and NPHC each have a school-wide council with representatives from each member organization. These councils are designed to facilitate communication between the different groups, and to facilitate relations with the university on matters such as school-wide events and membership.

=== Intramural sports ===
Kettering University offers intramural sports opportunities to students year-round. Sports offered include basketball, flag football, softball, soccer, volleyball, innertube water polo, outdoor broomball, volleyball, racquetball, Wiffleball home run derby, and more. The campus includes indoor basketball, tennis, and racquetball courts, a swimming pool, an indoor track, an outdoor track, softball and soccer fields, a sand volleyball court, and Atwood Stadium.

=== Student media ===
The low-power radio station WKUF-LP (94.3 FM) is run by Kettering University students and staff. It was founded in November 2004 and features music from several genres and talk programs from a variety of hosts.

Kettering University also has a student-run newspaper called The Technician. A print edition is published three times per term; an edition is also published online.

== Notable alumni ==
Mary Barra, CEO of General Motors, is a 1985 Kettering University graduate. Barra and former General Motors President Edward Nicholas Cole, a 1933 Kettering University graduate, who have appeared on the cover of Time.

Henry Juszkiewicz, a 1976 graduate, is the chairman and CEO of Gibson Guitar Corporation.

== See also ==
- Association of Independent Technological Universities
