= Baltimore Black Sox all-time roster =

The following is the list of players on the Baltimore Black Sox all-time roster. These are Baltimore Black Sox players who appeared in at least one game for the Black Sox from 1916 to 1933.

On-going research continuously discovers unreported or misreported games (and the affected players), while some games and players may be lost forever. Therefore, some Negro league players' affiliations will likely remain incomplete and possibly disputed.

‡ Bold player inducted as a member of the National Baseball Hall of Fame and Museum.

== A–D ==
Player	Year(s)	Position(s)	Ref
Alex Albritton	1922–1923	P	
Half Pint Allen	1932	P	
Major Allen	1922	2B	
Lewis Anderson	1933	C	
Luke Archer	1922	P	
John Beckwith	1924–1926, 1931	SS / 3B / OF	
Henry Blackmon	1924	3B	
Frank Blake	1932	OF	
George Boggs	1928	P	
Lefty Bowers	1926–1927	P	
Red Bradley	1927	P	
George Britt	1923–1926	P / 1B	
Scrappy Brown	1921–1922, 1926–1928	SS	
Buddy Burbage	1929, 1932	OF	
Ralph Burgin	1930	3B	
Tex Burnett	1933	C	
Maurice Busby	1922	P	
Wayne Carr	1923, 1925	P	
Cliff Carter	1923	P	
Paul Carter	1932	P	
Mickey Casey	1930–1932	C	
Porter Charleston	1932	P	
Morten Clark	1923	SS	
Bob Clarke	1923, 1925–1932	C	
Atkins Collins	1932	P	
Jimmy Cooke	1932	P	
Anthony Cooper	1933	SS	
Darltie Cooper	1926, 1931	P	
Sam Cooper	1923	P	
William Craddock	1929	—	
Rube Curry	1930	P / OF	
Eggie Dallard	1925–1926, 1932	OF / 1B	
Albert Davis	1931	P	
Connie Day	1924–1926	2B	
Leon Day‡	1934	P	
Paul Dixon	1932	OF	
Rap Dixon	1928–1931	OF	
Jake Dunn	1933	SS	

== E–K ==
Player	Year(s)	Position(s)	Ref
Mack Eggleston	1926–1928, 1930, 1933	C / OF	
Charley Evans	1921	OF	
William Evans	1925	P	
George Fiall	1925–1926	SS	
Tom Fiall	1925	SS	
Tom Finley	1932	3B	
Willis Flournoy	1929–1932	P	
Bill Force	1924–1929	P	
George Ford	1920–1924	SS / 2B / OF	
Márgaro Gámiz	1929	C	
Herbert Gay	1930	P	
George Giles	1933	OF	
Henry Gillespie	1931	P	
Willie Gisentaner	1932	OF	
Herman Gordon	1923	OF	
George Grayer	1920–1921	1B	
J. B. Hairstone	1920–1921	OF	
Blainey Hall	1920–1923, 1925	OF	
Halley Harding	1931	2B	
Bun Hayes	1928–1930, 1933	P	
Willie Haynes	1923	1B	
Pete Hill‡	1924–1925	OF	
Crush Holloway	1924–1928, 1931–1933	OF	
Lefty Holmes	1932	P	
Jesse Hubbard	1928–1929, 1933	OF / P	
Dick Jackson	1926–1928, 1931	2B	
Harry Jeffries	1924–1925, 1928, 1932	3B	
Jim Jeffries	1924–1925	OF / P	
Fats Jenkins	1930	OF	
Bert Johnson	1933	OF	
Claude Johnson	1923	SS / 2B	
Jimmy Johnson	1922	SS	
Heavy Johnson	1925–1926	OF	
Pearley Johnson	1926–1927, 1933	OF	
Wade Johnston	1924	OF	
Slim Jones	1932–1933	P	
Hen Jordan	1923	OF	
Eli Juran	1932	1B	
Ducky Kemp	1923	OF	
Andy Kyle	1922	OF	

== L–R ==
Player	Year(s)	Position(s)	Ref
Obie Lackey	1933	3B	
Duke Lattimore	1929	C	
Script Lee	1922, 1929–1931, 1933	P	
Bobo Leonard	1924–1925	OF	
Joe Lewis	1920–1923, 1933	C	
Clarence Lindsay	1923–1924, 1928	SS	
Nick Logan	1921–1923	P	
Dick Lundy	1929–1932	SS	
Biz Mackey‡	1928, 1930	C / IF	
Anthony Mahoney	1923	P	
Oliver Marcell	1929	3B	
Charlie Mason	1924	OF	
Bob McClure	1924–1928	P	
Webster McDonald	1930	P	
Terris McDuffie	1932	OF / P	
Red McNeal	1930	OF	
Chick Meade	1921	3B	
Babe Melton	1929	OF	
Louis Miller	1922–1923	3B	
Arnett Mitchell	1923, 1926	P	
Bill Monroe	1927	2B	
John Mungin	1925–1926	P	
Louis North	1922	OF	
Satchel Paige‡	1930	P	
Tom Payne	1933	OF	
Bill Perkins	1931	C	
Carlisle Perry	1923	2B	
Bill Pierce	1922	1B	
Ed Poles	1920, 1922–1924	SS	
Wilbert Pritchett	1926–1927	P	
O'Neal Pullen	1924	C	
Ramiro Ramírez	1923	OF	
Talmadge Richardson	1922–1923	OF / P	
Tom Richardson	1933	P	
Buck Ridgley	1920–1922, 1931	2B	
Dewey Rivers	1933	OF	
Rags Roberts	1922–1923	OF	
Julio Rojo	1923–1926	C / 3B	
Red Ryan	1929	P	

== S–Z ==
Player	Year(s)	Position(s)	Ref
Dick Seay	1926, 1932–1933	2B / SS	
Dennis Simpson	1933	1B	
Clarence Smith	1930	OF	
Cleo Smith	1922–1923, 1926, 1928	2B	
Dark Night Smith	1921–1922	P / 1B	
Herb Smith	1929, 1932	P	
Wyman Smith	1920–1924	OF	
Neck Stanley	1931	P	
Sam Streeter	1930	P	
Joe Strong	1924–1928	P	
Mule Suttles‡	1930	1B	
Doc Sykes	1920–1924	P	
Ben Taylor‡	1923, 1926–1928	1B	
Charley Thomas	1920–1922	C	
Dave Thomas	1930–1932	1B	
Orval Tucker	1930	3B	
Frank Warfield	1928–1931	2B	
Pete Washington	1927–1932	OF	
Joe Wheeler	1921, 1923	P	
Chaney White	1932	OF	
Joe Wiggins	1932	3B	
Harry Williams	1933	3B	
Harry Williams	1920–1921	3B	
Phil Williams	1931–1932	3B	
Roy Williams	1932–1933	P	
Jud Wilson‡	1922–1930	1B / 3B	
Percy Wilson	1924	1B	
Nip Winters	1929	1B / P	
James Womack	1933	1B	
Laymon Yokely	1926–1933	P	
