= List of Johnson C. Smith University alumni =

Johnson C. Smith University is a private historically black university in Charlotte, North Carolina. It was called Biddle Memorial Institute from 1867 to 1876 and Biddle University from 1876 to 1922.

Following is a list of some of its notability members.

Name	Graduation year	Notability	References
John Hurst Adams	1947	was an American civil rights activist and Bishop in the African Methodist Episcopal Church. He also served as a college president.	
Trezzvant Anderson	non-degreed	Journalist and author	
Tim Beamer	1971	Professional football player	
Harold Boulware		Civil rights attorney and judge in the United States.	
Frederick C. Branch	1942	First African American officer in the United States Marine Corps	
Jack S. Brayboy	1943	Football player, coach, teacher, and university administrator, all at Johnson C. Smith University	
Tyrone Britt	1967	Professional basketball player	
Vanderbilt Brown	1907	One of the first physicians to finish training in World War I with the Medical Reserve Corps	
Mickey Casey	non-degreed	Professional baseball player	
Eva Clayton	1955	United States House of Representatives from North Carolina	
Gregory Clifton	non-degreed	Professional football player with the Carolina Panthers and the Washington Redskins	
Dorothy Counts	1964	One of the first black students to attend Harry P. Harding High School in Charlotte, North Carolina	
Grover Covington		Professional player with the Canadian Football League	
John O. Crosby	non-degreed	First president of what is now North Carolina A&T State University	
Daniel Wallace Culp	1876	Pastor, principal, and doctor; first graduate of Biddle University	
Sadye Curry	1963	First African-American woman to become a gastroenterologist in the United States	
Charlie Smith Dannelly	1962	North Carolina Senate and Charlotte City Council	
Bill Davis	1963	Head football coach at South Carolina State University, Savannah State University, Tennessee State University, and Johnson C. Smith University	
De'Audra Dix	2009	Professional football player with the Canadian Football League	
Edward R. Dudley	1932	U.S. Ambassador to Liberia; first African American ambassador	
Bill Dusenbery		Professional football player with New Orleans Saints	
Thereasea Elder	non-degreed	First African American public health nurse in Charlotte, North Carolina	
Richard Erwin	1947	Judge on the United States District Court for the Middle District of North Carolina and the North Carolina Court of Appeal; first black federal judge in North Carolina	
Ferdinand Kwasi Fiawoo	1933	Ghanaian minister of religion, playwright, educator, and founder of Zion College in Ghana	
Malcolm Graham	1985	North Carolina Senate and Charlotte City Council	
Leford Green	2011	National Track Athlete of the Year in 2010 and 2011; 2012 Summer Olympics Jamaican National Olympic Track and Field team	
Chet Grimsley	1978	Author and first white student to garner accolades as All-CIAA and All-American at JCSU and at a historically Black college or university	
Larry D. Hall	1978	North Carolina House of Representatives	
Norman Washington Harllee		Supervisor of Dallas's public schools for Black children; principal of Dallas Colored High School	
Reginald Hawkins	1943	Civil rights activist; first African-American to run for Governor of North Carolina	
Bun Hayes	1929	Professional baseball player	
JoAnn Haysbert		Chancellor and Provost of Hampton University; president of Langston University	
Henry Aaron Hill	1936	Organic chemist; first Black president of the American Chemical Society	
Quentin Hillsman		Basketball coach at Syracuse University	
Cheris F. Hodges	1999	Author of African-American romance novels	
Delois Huntley		One of four black students to integrate Charlotte schools	
Cecil Ivory	1946	Presbyterian minister and civil rights leader	
Sara Dunlap Jackson	1943	National Archives and Records Administration archivist, Military Archives Division	
Benny Johnson	1970	Professional football player with the Houston Oilers and New Orleans Saints	
J. Charles Jones	1960	Co-founder of the Student Nonviolent Coordinating Committee (SNCC)	
Edward Joyner	1994	Basketball coach at Hampton University	
Boise Kimber	1981	Baptist minister and civil rights activist	
William Lindsay	1931	Professional baseball player	
Earl Manigault	non-degreed	Regarded as one of the greatest never to have played in the National Basketball Association	
Vince Matthews	1970	Winner of two gold medals for sprinting at the 1968 Summer Olympics and 1972 Summer Olympics	
Mildred Mitchell-Bateman	1941	Director of the Division of Professional Services at the West Virginia Department of Mental Health; chair of the Psychiatry Department at Marshall University	
Catherine Mae McKee McCottry	1941	was the first female African American physician in Charlotte, North Carolina, and the first female African American obstetrician and gynecologist in Charleston, South Carolina.	
Eddie McGirt	1948	Head football coach and athletic director at Johnson C. Smith University	
Curly Neal	1962	Member of the Harlem Globetrotters	
Pettis Norman	1962	Professional football player with the Dallas Cowboys and the San Diego Chargers	
Melanie Harrison Okoro	2005	Marine estuarine and environmental scientist	
Trevin Parks	2013	Professional basketball player and college basketball coach	
Obie Patterson	1965	Maryland House of Delegates and Maryland Senate	
Don Pullen	1963	Jazz pianist and organist	
Zilner Randolph		Jazz trumpeter and music educator	
Twiggy Sanders	1974	Member of the Harlem Globetrotters	
Jawn Sandifer	1935	New York Supreme Court justice; staff lawyer for the NAACP	
Gary Siplin	1976	Florida Senate and Florida House of Representatives	
Marvin Scott	1966	Sociology professor at Butler University	
Chris Smith	1992	Florida Senate and Florida House of Representatives	
Clarence F. Stephens	1938	Chair of the State University of New York at Potsdam mathematics department	
John Taylor		Professional football player	
Steel Arm Johnny Taylor		Professional baseball player and college baseball coach	
Evelyn Terry		North Carolina House of Representatives	
John Terry	non-degreed	Professional football player	
Sandra L. Townes	1966	Senior Judge of the United States District Court for the Eastern District of New York	
Skeets Tolbert		Jazz clarinetist	
Faya Ora Rose Touré	1966	Civil rights activist, lawyer, and first black female judge in Alabama	
Orval Tucker		Professional baseball player	
McKinley Washington Jr.	1961	South Carolina Senate and South Carolina House of Representatives	
Ola B. Watford	1946	Geophysicist with the United States Department of Commerce	
Bob Wells	1968	Professional football player	
Avon Williams	1940	Tennessee State Senate and civil right attorney	
Danielle Williams	2014	Winner of the gold medal at the 2015 World Championships for sprint hurdles	
Shermaine Williams	2011	Sprinter and 2012 Summer Olympics representative for Jamaica	
Emanuel Wilson	non-degreed	Professional football player with the Denver Broncos and the Green Bay Packers	
Draff Young		Professional basketball coach	
Daniel Whyte (American football)		Professional football player	
