= Johnson C. Smith Golden Bulls =

Intercollegiate sports teams of Johnson C. Smith University

- University: Johnson C. Smith University
- NCAA: Division II
- Conference: CIAA (primary)
- Athletic director: Denisha Hendricks
- Location: Charlotte, North Carolina
- Varsity teams: 13 (6 men's, 7 women's)
- Football stadium: Irwin Belk Complex
- Basketball arena: Jack S. Brayboy Gymnasium
- Softball stadium: Biddleville Park
- Tennis venue: Coleman/Cuthbertson Tennis Courts
- Nickname: Golden Bulls
- Colors: Navy blue and gold
- Mascot: Smitty the Golden Bull
- Website: goldenbullsports.com
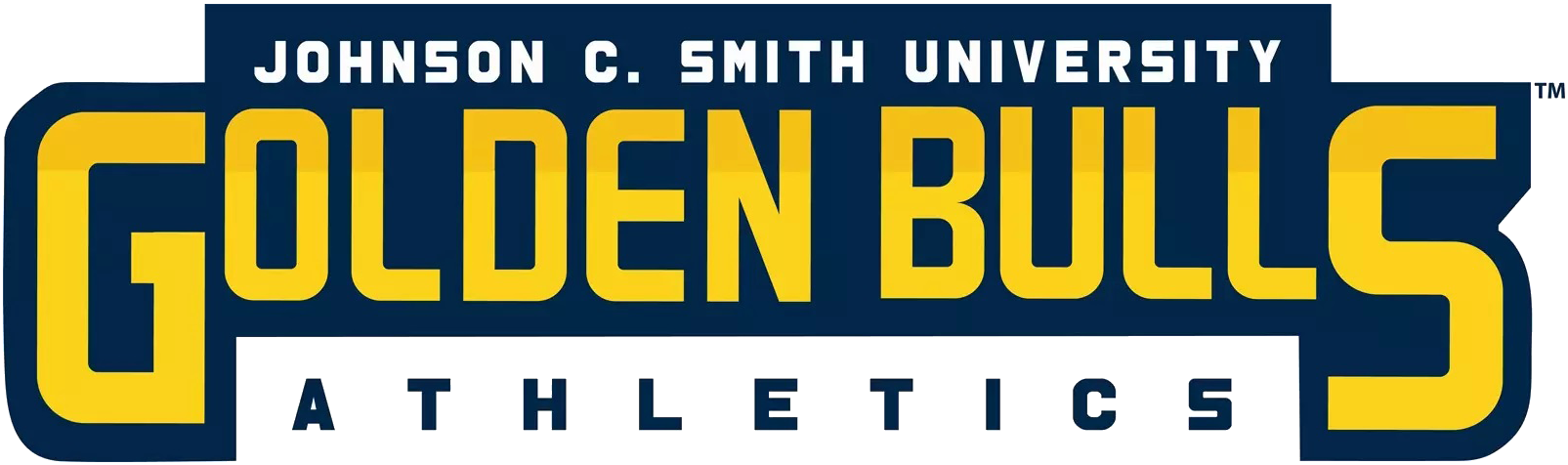

The Johnson C. Smith Golden Bulls are the athletic teams that represent Johnson C. Smith University, located in Charlotte, North Carolina, in intercollegiate sports at the Division II level of the National Collegiate Athletic Association (NCAA), primarily competing in the Central Intercollegiate Athletic Association since 1926.

== Conference affiliations ==
NCAA

- Independent (1892–1925)
- Central Intercollegiate Athletic Association (1926–present)

== Varsity teams ==
Men's sports	Women's sports
Basketball	Basketball
Cross country	Bowling
Football	Cross country
Golf	Softball
Tennis	Tennis
Track and field^{†}	Track and field^{†}
	Volleyball
† – Track and field includes both indoor and outdoor

=== Basketball ===
In 2001 the men's basketball team won the CIAA Basketball Tournament and advanced to the Division II Elite Eight. In 2006 the men's and women's basketball teams were the CIAA Western Division Champions and the Tournament Runners-up. In 2007 the men's basketball team were the 2007 CIAA Western Division Champions. In 2008 the men's basketball team won the 2008 CIAA Men's Basketball Championship. In 2009 the men's and women's basketball team won the 2009 CIAA basketball championship. Sports Illustrated named its venue "One of the Loudest Gymnasiums in the Country."

=== Football ===
==== Commemorative Classic: "The Birth of Black College Football" ====
On December 27, 1892, Livingstone College and Biddle College, (Johnson C. Smith) University played in the snows of Salisbury, North Carolina, just two days after Christmas. A writer of a story in the 1930 year-book of Livingstone College provided a glimpse of that December experience when the team from Biddle Institute traveled to Livingstone's Old Delta Grove campus in Salisbury to play while writers recorded the results of a historic moment in sports history.

According to historian T.M. Martin, the men of Biddle spent two years studying and practicing the sport of football. In 1892, they challenged the men of Livingstone, whose team was formally organized in the fall of that year.

It is doubtful that when Biddle University and Livingstone College teed it up on Dec. 27, 1892, in what was described as little more than a cow pasture, no less, if the contestants in this momentous occasion had the slightest inkling of the legacy they were about to give birth to. Games of monumental historical significance, coaches of legendary proportions and players of extraordinary brilliance ultimately emerged from the mother lode that was to become known as the historically Black colleges and universities. The teams played two 45-minute halves on Livingstone's front lawn. W.J. Trent scored Livingstone's only touchdown on a fumble recovery. By then snow had covered the field's markings and Biddle argued that the fumble was recovered out of bounds. The official ruled in Biddle's favor, allowing them to keep the 5–0 lead that they had established early on and giving JCSU the historic 1st victory! And the rivalry continues. ...

==== Bowl games ====
Johnson C. Smith has made seven bowl game appearances, winning four and losing three. After an initial appearance in a postseason contest in the 1942 Flower Bowl against Lane College in a shutout, 13–0.

Date	Bowl	W/L	Opponent	PF	PA
January 1, 1942	Flower Bowl	W	Lane	13	0
January 1, 1946	Cotton-Tobacco Bowl	W	Allen	18	6
December 7, 1946	Pecan Bowl	L	South Carolina NIA&M	6	13
December 3, 1949	Iodine Bowl	W	Allen	20	12
December 2, 2006	Pioneer Bowl	L	Tuskegee	7	17
December 3, 2011	Pioneer Bowl	W	Miles	35	33
December 13, 2023	Florida Beach Bowl	L	Fort Valley State	10	23
Total	7 bowl games	4–3		109	104

==== NCAA Division II playoffs ====
The Golden Bulls have made one appearance in the NCAA Division II playoffs, with a combined record of 0–1.

Year	Round	Opponent	Result
2025	First Round	Frostburg State	L, 7–21

== Notable alumni ==
=== Baseball ===
- Mickey Casey
- Bun Hayes
- Clarence Lindsay
- William Lindsay
- Steel Arm Johnny Taylor
- Orval Tucker

=== Basketball ===
- Tyrone Britt
- Quentin Hillsman
- Edward Joyner
- Earl Manigault
- Fred "Curly" Neal
- Trevin Parks
- James "Twiggy" Sanders
- Draff Young

=== Football ===
- Gregory Clifton
- Tim Beamer
- Jack S. Brayboy
- Grover Covington
- Bill Davis
- De'Audra Dix
- Bill Dusenbery
- Chet Grimsley
- Tim Harkness
- Benny Johnson
- Harris Jones
- Eddie McGirt
- Pettis Norman
- Reggie Sullivan
- John Taylor
- John Terry
- Bob Wells
- Emanuel Wilson

=== Track and field ===
- Leford Green
- Vincent Matthews
- Danielle Williams
- Shermaine Williams
