= Houston Rockets all-time roster =

American professional basketball team players

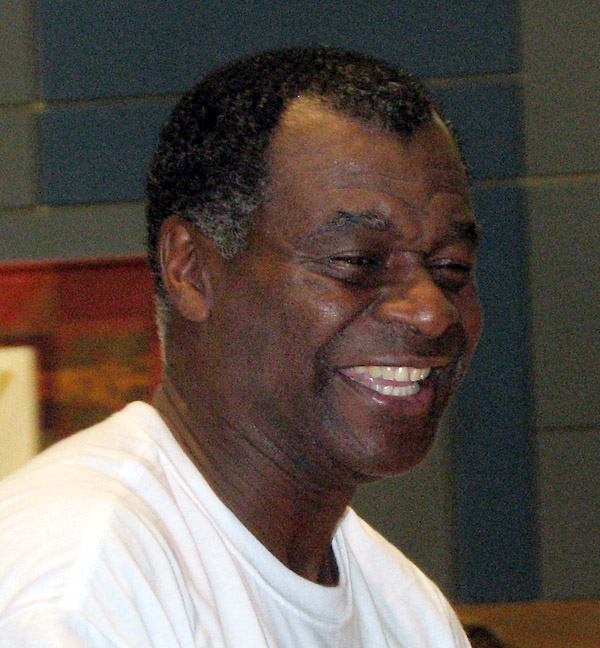
Calvin Murphy played all of his 13 seasons in Houston.

The Houston Rockets are an American professional basketball team based in Houston, Texas. The team plays in the Southwest Division of the Western Conference in National Basketball Association (NBA). The team was established in 1967, and played in San Diego, California for four years before being moved to Houston. In the Rockets debut season, they won only 15 games. However, after drafting Elvin Hayes first overall in the 1969 NBA draft, they made their first appearance in the playoffs in 1969. After Hayes was traded, Moses Malone was acquired to replace him. Malone won two MVPs during his time in Houston, and he led the Rockets to the conference finals in his first year with the team. He also took the Rockets to the NBA Finals in 1981, but they were defeated in six games by the Boston Celtics. In 1984, the Rockets drafted Hakeem Olajuwon, who led them to the 1986 Finals in his second year, where they lost again to Boston. In the next seven seasons, they lost in the first round of the playoffs five times. They won their first NBA championship in 1994, led by Olajuwon, who won Finals MVP. They repeated as champions the next year, and Olajuwon won Finals MVP once again. To date, the Rockets have not advanced to the finals again. The Rockets missed the playoffs from 1999 to 2003, and did not make the playoffs again until after they drafted Yao Ming in 2002. Beginning in 2003, the Rockets had a winning season in all but two of the next 18 seasons and, led by James Harden, advanced to the conference finals in 2015 and in 2018.

The following is a list of all the players, both past and current, who have appeared in at least one game for the franchise.

== Players ==
Note: Statistics are correct through the end of the 2025–26 season.

G	Guard	G/F	Guard-forward	F	Forward	F/C	Forward-center	C	Center

legend
^	Denotes player who has been inducted to the Naismith Memorial Basketball Hall of Fame
*	Denotes player who has been selected for at least one All-Star Game with the Houston Rockets and is currently on the team roster
^{+}	Denotes player who has been selected for at least one All-Star Game with the Houston Rockets
^{x}	Denotes player who is currently on the Houston Rockets roster
0.0	Denotes the Houston Rockets statistics leader (min. 100 games played for the team for per-game statistics)

=== A ===
All-time roster
Player	Pos.	Pre-draft team	Yrs	Seasons	Statistics									Ref.
Player	Pos.	Pre-draft team	Yrs	Seasons	GP	MP	REB	AST	PTS	MPG	RPG	APG	PPG	Ref.
Zaid Abdul-Aziz	F/C	Iowa State	4	1972–1975; 1977–1978	206	4,943	1,750	310	1,966	24.0	8.5	1.5	9.5	
Mark Acres	F/C	Oral Roberts	1	1992–1993	6	23	6	0	6	3.8	1.0	0.0	1.0	
Bud Acton	F	Hillsdale	1	1967–1968	23	195	47	11	77	8.5	2.0	0.5	3.3	
Don Adams	F	Northwestern	2	1970–1972	85	2,415	589	176	950	28.4	6.9	2.1	11.2	
Steven Adams^{x}	C	Pittsburgh	2	2024–2026	90	1,524	603	114	412	16.9	6.7	1.3	4.6	
Rick Adelman	G	Loyola Marymount	2	1968–1970	112	2,165	297	351	745	19.3	2.7	3.1	6.7	
Jeff Adrien	F	UConn	1	2011–2012	8	63	22	1	21	7.9	2.8	0.1	2.6	
Cole Aldrich	C	Kansas	1	2012–2013	30	213	57	6	50	7.1	1.9	0.2	1.7	
Rafer Alston	G	Fresno State	4	2005–2009	267	9,588	941	1,519	3,370	35.9	3.5	5.7	12.6	
David Andersen	C	(Italy) Virtus Bologna	1	2009–2010	63	891	208	44	367	14.1	3.3	0.7	5.8	
Derek Anderson	G	Kentucky	1	2005–2006	20	582	83	53	216	29.1	4.2	2.7	10.8	
James Anderson	G/F	Oklahoma State	1	2012–2013	29	307	58	33	115	10.6	2.0	1.1	4.0	
Richard Anderson	F/C	UC Santa Barbara	2	1986–1988	63	365	96	37	176	5.8	1.5	0.6	2.8	
Ryan Anderson	F	California	3	2016–2018; 2019–2020	140	3,855	668	130	1,601	27.5	4.8	0.9	11.4	
Shandon Anderson	G/F	Georgia	2	1999–2001	164	5,096	717	428	1,719	31.1	4.4	2.6	10.5	
Carmelo Anthony^	F	Syracuse	1	2018–2019	10	294	54	5	134	29.4	5.4	0.5	13.4	
Trevor Ariza	F	UCLA	5	2009–2010; 2014–2018	382	13,460	1,980	953	4,863	35.2	5.2	2.5	12.7	
Hilton Armstrong	F/C	UConn	1	2009–2010	9	40	6	3	10	4.4	0.7	0.3	1.1	
Ron Artest	F	St. John's	1	2008–2009	69	2,452	359	229	1,181	35.5	5.2	3.3	17.1	
Ömer Aşık	C	(Turkey) Fenerbahçe	2	2012–2014	130	3,432	1,334	100	1,112	26.4	10.3	0.8	8.6	
D. J. Augustin	G	Texas	2	2020–2022	54	926	85	152	393	17.1	1.6	2.8	7.3	

=== B ===
All-time roster
Player	Pos.	Pre-draft team	Yrs	Seasons	Statistics									Ref.
Player	Pos.	Pre-draft team	Yrs	Seasons	GP	MP	REB	AST	PTS	MPG	RPG	APG	PPG	Ref.
Gus Bailey	G/F	UTEP	2	1974–1976	77	708	132	100	192	9.2	1.7	1.3	2.5	
James Bailey	F/C	Rutgers	2	1982–1984	142	2,889	762	144	1,622	20.3	5.4	1.0	11.4	
Vin Baker	F	Hartford	1	2004–2005	3	13	2	1	2	4.3	0.7	0.3	0.7	
Tom Barker	F/C	Hawaii	1	1978–1979	5	16	6	0	8	3.2	1.2	0.0	1.6	
Charles Barkley^	F	Auburn	4	1996–2000	183	6,398	2,235	720	3,017	35.0	12.2	3.9	16.5	
Harry Barnes	F	Northeastern	1	1968–1969	22	126	26	5	43	5.7	1.2	0.2	2.0	
Jim Barnett	G/F	Oregon	3	1967–1970	207	5,519	822	760	2,794	26.7	4.0	3.7	13.5	
John Barnhill	G	Tennessee State	1	1967–1968	75	1,883	173	259	744	25.1	2.3	3.5	9.9	
Andre Barrett	G	Seton Hall	1	2004–2005	27	314	19	42	56	11.6	0.7	1.6	2.1	
Brent Barry	G	Oregon State	1	2008–2009	56	857	94	78	208	15.3	1.7	1.4	3.7	
Jon Barry	G	Georgia Tech	2	2004–2006	73	1,572	169	165	458	21.5	2.3	2.3	6.3	
Rick Barry^	F	Miami (FL)	2	1978–1980	152	4,382	513	770	1,948	28.8	3.4	5.1	12.8	
Shane Battier	F	Duke	5	2006–2011	348	11,912	1,623	784	3,052	34.2	4.7	2.3	8.8	
Lonny Baxter	F	Maryland	1	2005–2006	23	281	84	2	82	12.2	3.7	0.1	3.6	
Michael Beasley	F	Kansas State	1	2015–2016	20	363	98	16	255	18.2	4.9	0.8	12.8	
Ron Behagen	F/C	Minnesota	1	1977–1978	3	33	7	2	14	11.0	2.3	0.7	4.7	
Elmer Bennett	G	Notre Dame	1	1996–1997	4	16	1	4	10	4.0	0.3	1.0	2.5	
Walter Berry	F	St. John's	1	1988–1989	40	799	152	57	350	20.0	3.8	1.4	8.8	
Patrick Beverley	G	Arkansas	5	2012–2017	291	8,290	1,185	980	2,708	28.5	4.1	3.4	9.3	
Tarik Black	F/C	Kansas	2	2014–2015; 2017–2018	76	929	290	21	285	12.2	3.8	0.3	3.8	
John Block	F/C	USC	4	1967–1971	285	7,910	2,325	447	4,138	27.8	8.2	1.6	14.5	
Keith Bogans	G/F	Kentucky	1	2005–2006	33	1,064	149	83	281	32.2	4.5	2.5	8.5	
Phil Bond	G	Louisville	1	1977–1978	7	21	4	2	4	3.0	0.6	0.3	0.6	
Melvin Booker	G	Missouri	1	1995–1996	11	131	9	21	44	11.9	0.8	1.9	4.0	
Ryan Bowen	F	Iowa	2	2004–2006	134	1,256	164	42	199	9.4	1.2	0.3	1.5	
Anthony Bowie	G/F	Oklahoma	1	1989–1990	66	918	118	96	284	13.9	1.8	1.5	4.3	
Earl Boykins	G	Eastern Michigan	1	2011–2012	8	111	11	17	39	13.9	1.4	2.1	4.9	
Alonzo Bradley	F	Texas Southern	3	1977–1980	99	1,139	151	74	440	11.5	1.5	0.7	4.4	
Avery Bradley	G	Texas	1	2020–2021	17	391	39	32	88	23.0	2.3	1.9	5.2	
Torraye Braggs	F	Xavier	2	2003–2005	18	156	46	6	40	8.7	2.6	0.3	2.2	
Tim Breaux	F	Wyoming	2	1994–1996	96	910	94	39	289	9.5	1.0	0.4	3.0	
Corey Brewer	G/F	Florida	3	2014–2017	196	3,999	516	265	1,498	20.4	2.6	1.4	7.6	
Ronnie Brewer	G/F	Arkansas	1	2013–2014	23	158	14	10	7	6.9	0.6	0.4	0.3	
Tyrone Britt	G	Johnson C. Smith	1	1967–1968	11	84	15	12	28	7.6	1.4	1.1	2.5	
Aaron Brooks	G	Oregon	6	2007–2011; 2012–2014	297	7,090	543	977	3,465	23.9	1.8	3.3	11.7	
Armoni Brooks	G	Houston	2	2020–2022	61	1,210	149	79	477	19.8	2.4	1.3	7.8	
Dillon Brooks	F	Oregon	2	2023–2025	147	4,615	521	247	1,968	31.4	3.5	1.7	13.4	
Scott Brooks	G	UC Irvine	3	1992–1995	183	2,927	214	414	996	16.0	1.2	2.3	5.4	
Bobby Brown	G	Cal State Fullerton	2	2016–2018	45	238	13	25	112	5.3	0.3	0.6	2.5	
Chucky Brown	F	NC State	2	1994–1996	123	2,833	630	119	954	23.0	5.1	1.0	7.8	
Markel Brown	G	Oklahoma State	1	2017–2018	4	31	5	2	5	7.8	1.3	0.5	1.3	
Sterling Brown	G	SMU	1	2020–2021	51	1,229	224	72	416	24.1	4.4	1.4	8.2	
Tierre Brown	G	McNeese State	1	2001–2002	40	403	42	70	123	10.1	1.1	1.8	3.1	
Tony Brown	G/F	Arkansas	1	1988–1989	14	91	15	5	36	6.5	1.1	0.4	2.6	
Rick Brunson	G	Temple	1	2005–2006	23	215	20	33	44	9.3	0.9	1.4	1.9	
Joe Bryant	F/C	La Salle	1	1982–1983	81	2,055	277	186	812	25.4	3.4	2.3	10.0	
Mark Bryant	F/C	Seton Hall	1	1995–1996	71	1,587	351	52	611	22.4	4.9	0.7	8.6	
Chase Budinger	F	Arizona	3	2009–2012	210	4,524	718	289	1,980	21.5	3.4	1.4	9.4	
Matt Bullard	F	Iowa	9	1990–1994; 1996–2001	538	8,074	1,116	501	2,991	15.0	2.1	0.9	5.6	
Reggie Bullock	F	North Carolina	1	2023–2024	44	417	73	15	96	9.5	1.7	0.3	2.2	

=== C ===
All-time roster
Player	Pos.	Pre-draft team	Yrs	Seasons	Statistics									Ref.
Player	Pos.	Pre-draft team	Yrs	Seasons	GP	MP	REB	AST	PTS	MPG	RPG	APG	PPG	Ref.
Bruno Caboclo	F	(Brazil) Pinheiros Basquete	2	2019–2021	14	88	30	3	45	6.3	2.1	0.2	3.2	
Adrian Caldwell	F/C	Lamar	3	1989–1991; 1994–1995	100	704	219	15	179	7.0	2.2	0.2	1.8	
Marcus Camby	F/C	UMass	1	2011–2012	19	458	176	32	135	24.1	9.3	1.7	7.1	
Isaiah Canaan	G	Murray State	3	2013–2015; 2017–2018	48	625	58	51	255	13.0	1.2	1.1	5.3	
Clint Capela^{x}	C	(France) Élan Chalon	7	2014–2020; 2025–2026	409	9,600	3,588	374	4,357	23.5	8.8	0.9	10.7	
Antoine Carr	F/C	Wichita State	1	1998–1999	18	152	31	9	47	8.4	1.7	0.5	2.6	
DeMarre Carroll	F	Missouri	2	2010–2011; 2019–2020	14	166	24	16	54	11.9	1.7	1.1	3.9	
Joe Barry Carroll	F/C	Purdue	1	1987–1988	63	1,596	396	94	759	25.3	6.3	1.5	12.0	
Michael Carter-Williams	G	Syracuse	1	2018–2019	16	145	13	21	69	9.1	0.8	1.3	4.3	
Sam Cassell	G	Florida State	3	1993–1996	209	4,686	533	875	2,109	22.4	2.6	4.2	10.1	
Omri Casspi	F	(Israel) Maccabi Tel Aviv	1	2013–2014	71	1,283	260	88	490	18.1	3.7	1.2	6.9	
Kelvin Cato	C	Iowa State	5	1999–2004	317	7,112	1,955	158	1,975	22.4	6.2	0.5	6.2	
Tyson Chandler	C	Dominguez (CA)	1	2019–2020	26	219	66	6	34	8.4	2.5	0.2	1.3	
Derrick Chievous	F	Missouri	2	1988–1990	122	2,031	331	104	994	16.6	2.7	0.9	8.1	
Pete Chilcutt	F/C	North Carolina	2	1994–1996	142	1,998	473	92	558	14.1	3.3	0.6	3.9	
Chris Chiozza	G	Florida	1	2018–2019	7	33	4	4	6	4.7	0.6	0.6	0.9	
Marquese Chriss	F	Washington	1	2018–2019	16	104	28	6	29	6.5	1.8	0.4	1.8	
Josh Christopher	G	Arizona State	2	2021–2023	138	2,120	257	223	959	15.4	1.9	1.6	6.9	
Gary Clark	F	Cincinnati	2	2018–2020	69	853	156	30	218	12.4	2.3	0.4	3.2	
Chris Clemons	G	Campbell	1	2019–2020	33	291	30	27	161	8.8	0.9	0.8	4.9	
E. C. Coleman	F	Houston Baptist	2	1973–1974; 1978–1979	64	1,114	259	77	314	17.4	4.0	1.2	4.9	
Jason Collier	C	Georgia Tech	3	2000–2003	61	691	148	16	213	11.3	2.4	0.3	3.5	
Sean Colson	G	Charlotte	1	2000–2001	10	30	3	7	15	3.0	0.3	0.7	1.5	
Lester Conner	G	Oregon State	1	1987–1988	52	399	38	59	132	7.7	0.7	1.1	2.5	
Will Conroy	G	Washington	1	2009–2010	5	36	3	7	6	7.2	0.6	1.4	1.2	
Brian Cook	F	Illinois	2	2008–2010	24	69	14	2	33	2.9	0.6	0.1	1.4	
Daequan Cook	G	Ohio State	1	2012–2013	16	165	18	10	55	10.3	1.1	0.6	3.4	
DeMarcus Cousins	C	Kentucky	1	2020–2021	25	506	191	60	241	20.2	7.6	2.4	9.6	
Robert Covington	F	Tennessee State	2	2013–2014; 2019–2020	29	760	181	32	271	26.2	6.2	1.1	9.3	
Isaiah Crawford^{x}	F	Louisiana Tech	1	2025–2026	14	92	16	5	28	6.6	1.1	0.4	2.0	
Dick Cunningham	C	Murray State	1	1971–1972	63	720	243	57	171	11.4	3.9	0.9	2.7	
Earl Cureton	F/C	Detroit Mercy	1	1993–1994	2	30	12	0	4	15.0	6.0	0.0	2.0	
Bill Curley	F	Boston College	1	1999–2000	4	50	8	0	12	12.5	2.0	0.0	3.0	

=== D to E ===
All-time roster
Player	Pos.	Pre-draft team	Yrs	Seasons	Statistics									Ref.
Player	Pos.	Pre-draft team	Yrs	Seasons	GP	MP	REB	AST	PTS	MPG	RPG	APG	PPG	Ref.
Samuel Dalembert	C	Seton Hall	1	2011–2012	65	1,446	456	33	490	22.2	7.0	0.5	7.5	
Troy Daniels	G	VCU	2	2013–2015	22	183	10	9	88	8.3	0.5	0.4	4.0	
N'Faly Dante	C	Oregon	1	2024–2025	4	51	21	2	24	12.8	5.3	0.5	6.0	
Emanual Davis	G	Delaware State	2	1996–1998	58	829	69	85	249	14.3	1.2	1.5	4.3	
Jim Davis	F/C	Colorado	1	1971–1972	12	180	44	5	62	15.0	3.7	0.4	5.2	
Josh Davis	F	Wyoming	1	2005–2006	1	0	0	0	0	0.0	0.0	0.0	0.0	
JD Davison^{x}	G	Alabama	1	2025–2026	28	218	34	35	69	7.8	1.2	1.3	2.5	
Darius Days	F	LSU	1	2022–2023	4	25	6	1	15	6.3	1.5	0.3	3.8	
Sam Dekker	F	Wisconsin	2	2015–2017	80	1,425	285	76	504	17.8	3.6	1.0	6.3	
Carlos Delfino	G	(Italy) Fortitudo Bologna	1	2012–2013	67	1,689	220	135	708	25.2	3.3	2.0	10.6	
Michael Dickerson	G/F	Arizona	1	1998–1999	50	1,558	83	95	547	31.2	1.7	1.9	10.9	
Byron Dinkins	G	Charlotte	1	1989–1990	33	362	40	75	115	11.0	1.2	2.3	3.5	
Jacky Dorsey	F	Georgia	1	1978–1979	20	108	23	2	56	5.4	1.2	0.1	2.8	
Joey Dorsey	F	Memphis	3	2008–2010; 2014–2015	79	914	305	28	197	11.6	3.9	0.4	2.5	
Toney Douglas	G	Florida State	1	2012–2013	49	913	90	93	399	18.6	1.8	1.9	8.1	
Goran Dragić	G	(Slovenia) Olimpija	2	2010–2012	88	2,130	224	406	945	24.2	2.5	4.6	10.7	
Bryce Drew	G	Valparaiso	2	1998–2000	106	1,734	135	214	538	16.4	1.3	2.0	5.1	
Clyde Drexler (#22)^	G	Houston	4	1994–1998	219	8,041	1,338	1,192	4,155	36.7	6.1	5.4	19.0	
Mike Dunleavy Sr.	G	South Carolina	5	1977–1982	280	5,548	459	1,051	2,341	19.8	1.6	3.8	8.4	
Kevin Durant*	F	Texas	1	2025–2026	78	2,840	426	372	2,026	36.4	5.5	4.8	26.0	
Tari Eason^{x}	F	LSU	4	2022–2026	221	5,216	1,387	288	2,288	23.6	6.3	1.3	10.4	
Vincent Edwards	F	Purdue	1	2018–2019	2	16	2	0	3	8.0	1.0	0.0	1.5	
Johnny Egan	G	Providence	2	1970–1972	74	851	57	105	181	11.5	0.8	1.4	2.4	
Craig Ehlo	G/F	Washington State	3	1983–1986	88	451	80	61	208	5.1	0.9	0.7	2.4	
Mario Elie	G/F	American International	5	1993–1998	344	9,562	923	1,066	3,356	27.8	2.7	3.1	9.8	
James Ennis III	F	Long Beach State	1	2018–2019	40	949	117	27	294	23.7	2.9	0.7	7.4	
Tyler Ennis	G	Syracuse	1	2016–2017	31	196	19	34	58	6.3	0.6	1.1	1.9	

=== F to G ===
All-time roster
Player	Pos.	Pre-draft team	Yrs	Seasons	Statistics									Ref.
Player	Pos.	Pre-draft team	Yrs	Seasons	GP	MP	REB	AST	PTS	MPG	RPG	APG	PPG	Ref.
Kenneth Faried	F	Morehead State	1	2018–2019	25	610	206	18	323	24.4	8.2	0.7	12.9	
Dave Feitl	C	UTEP	2	1986–1987; 1990–1991	114	870	217	30	366	7.6	1.9	0.3	3.2	
Bruno Fernando	C	Maryland	2	2021–2023	41	458	162	33	195	11.2	4.0	0.8	4.8	
Hank Finkel	C	Dayton	2	1967–1969	88	1,448	482	93	744	16.5	5.5	1.1	8.5	
Dorian Finney-Smith^{x}	F	Florida	1	2025–2026	37	620	93	36	123	16.8	2.5	1.0	3.3	
Sleepy Floyd	G	Georgetown	6	1987–1993	439	11,631	1,104	2,363	5,030	26.5	2.5	5.4	11.5	
Jonny Flynn	G	Syracuse	1	2011–2012	11	135	8	28	37	12.3	0.7	2.5	3.4	
Alton Ford	F	Houston	1	2003–2004	9	41	11	3	15	4.6	1.2	0.3	1.7	
Phil Ford	G	North Carolina	2	1983–1985	106	2,310	164	471	616	21.8	1.5	4.4	5.8	
Courtney Fortson	G	Arkansas	1	2011–2012	6	49	7	5	18	8.2	1.2	0.8	3.0	
Richie Frahm	G	Gonzaga	1	2005–2006	8	117	10	6	42	14.6	1.3	0.8	5.3	
Steve Francis^{+}	G	Maryland	6	1999–2004; 2007–2008	384	15,024	2,318	2,411	7,281	39.1	6.0	6.3	19.0	
Michael Frazier	G	Florida	1	2019–2020	13	145	10	2	27	11.2	0.8	0.2	2.1	
World B. Free	G	Guilford	1	1987–1988	58	682	44	60	374	11.8	0.8	1.0	6.4	
Reece Gaines	G	Louisville	1	2004–2005	10	108	11	3	26	10.8	1.1	0.3	2.6	
Dave Gambee	F	Oregon State	1	1967–1968	80	1,755	464	93	1,071	21.9	5.8	1.2	13.4	
Francisco García	G/F	Louisville	3	2012–2015	87	1,602	162	98	475	18.4	1.9	1.1	5.5	
Winston Garland	G	Missouri State	1	1992–1993	66	1,004	108	138	391	15.2	1.6	2.1	5.9	
Calvin Garrett	F	Oral Roberts	3	1980–1983	125	2,530	365	211	667	20.2	2.9	1.7	5.3	
Usman Garuba	F/C	(Spain) Real Madrid Baloncesto	2	2021–2023	99	1,210	390	81	273	12.2	3.9	0.8	2.8	
Dick Gibbs	G/F	UTEP	2	1971–1973	65	759	140	52	235	11.7	2.2	0.8	3.6	
Dan Godfread	C	Evansville	1	1991–1992	1	2	0	0	0	2.0	0.0	0.0	0.0	
Eric Gordon	G	Indiana	7	2016–2023	379	11,528	858	886	5,944	30.4	2.3	2.3	15.7	
Andrew Goudelock	G	College of Charleston	1	2015–2016	8	50	2	4	22	6.3	0.3	0.5	2.8	
Stephen Graham	G	Oklahoma State	1	2005–2006	6	38	7	3	17	6.3	1.2	0.5	2.8	
Devin Gray	F	Clemson	1	1999–2000	21	124	25	5	49	5.9	1.2	0.2	2.3	
Gerald Green	G/F	Gulf Shores Academy (TX)	3	2007–2008; 2017–2019	115	2,406	317	65	1,178	20.9	2.8	0.6	10.2	
Jalen Green	G	Prolific Prep (CA)	4	2021–2025	307	10,038	1,310	1,030	6,173	32.7	4.3	3.4	20.1	
Jeff Green^{x}	F	Georgetown	4	2019–2020; 2023–2026	158	2,285	313	128	968	14.5	2.0	0.8	6.1	
Johnny Green	F/C	Michigan State	1	1967–1968	42	1,073	423	59	582	25.5	10.1	1.4	13.9	
Adrian Griffin	G/F	Seton Hall	1	2003–2004	19	133	19	10	11	7.0	1.0	0.5	0.6	
Eddie Griffin	F/C	Seton Hall	2	2001–2003	150	3,786	877	139	1,306	25.2	5.8	0.9	8.7	
Matt Guokas	G/F	Saint Joseph's	1	1973–1974	39	1,007	60	133	207	25.8	1.5	3.4	5.3	

=== H ===
All-time roster
Player	Pos.	Pre-draft team	Yrs	Seasons	Statistics									Ref.
Player	Pos.	Pre-draft team	Yrs	Seasons	GP	MP	REB	AST	PTS	MPG	RPG	APG	PPG	Ref.
Jordan Hamilton	G/F	Texas	1	2013–2014	21	349	61	18	138	16.6	2.9	0.9	6.6	
Thomas Hamilton	C	Pittsburgh	1	1999–2000	22	273	90	15	82	12.4	4.1	0.7	3.7	
James Harden^{+}	G	Arizona State	9	2012–2021	621	23,006	3,736	4,796	18,365	37.0	6.0	7.7	29.6	
Montrezl Harrell	F/C	Louisville	2	2015–2017	97	1,443	284	81	667	14.9	2.9	0.8	6.9	
Othella Harrington	F/C	Georgetown	3	1996–1999	156	2,666	651	57	1,023	17.1	4.2	0.4	6.6	
Mike Harris	F	Rice	3	2007–2008; 2009–2011	29	257	79	7	95	8.9	2.7	0.2	3.3	
Steve Harris	G	Tulsa	3	1985–1988	145	1,855	248	167	953	12.8	1.7	1.2	6.6	
Isaiah Hartenstein	F	(Lithuania) BC Žalgiris	2	2018–2020	51	487	137	33	160	9.5	2.7	0.6	3.1	
Steve Hawes	F/C	Washington	2	1974–1976	61	948	293	98	335	15.5	4.8	1.6	5.5	
Juaquin Hawkins	G/F	Long Beach State	1	2002–2003	58	685	78	47	134	11.8	1.3	0.8	2.3	
Chuck Hayes	F/C	Kentucky	7	2005–2011; 2015–2016	426	8,558	2,449	537	1,858	20.1	5.7	1.3	4.4	
Elvin Hayes (#44)^	F/C	Houston	7	1968–1972; 1981–1984	572	20,782	6,974	1,104	11,762	36.3	12.2	1.9	20.6	
Luther Head	G	Illinois	4	2005–2009	255	6,222	680	582	2,242	24.4	2.7	2.3	8.8	
Alvin Heggs	F	Texas	1	1995–1996	4	14	2	0	8	3.5	0.5	0.0	2.0	
Gerald Henderson	G	VCU	1	1991–1992	8	34	2	5	12	4.3	0.3	0.6	1.5	
Tom Henderson	G	Hawaii	4	1979–1983	258	5,472	422	1,025	1,446	21.2	1.6	4.0	5.6	
Conner Henry	G	UC Santa Barbara	1	1986–1987	18	92	7	8	24	5.1	0.4	0.4	1.3	
Carl Herrera	F	Houston	4	1991–1995	260	4,989	1,116	169	1,564	19.2	4.3	0.7	6.0	
Phil Hicks	F	Tulane	1	1976–1977	2	7	1	1	0	3.5	0.5	0.5	0.0	
Jordan Hill	F/C	Arizona	3	2009–2012	127	1,966	575	56	714	15.5	4.5	0.4	5.6	
Nate Hinton	G	Houston	1	2023–2024	15	75	22	10	33	5.0	1.5	0.7	2.2	
Aaron Holiday^{x}	G	UCLA	3	2023–2026	197	2,842	259	283	1,166	14.4	1.3	1.4	5.9	
Lionel Hollins	G	Arizona State	1	1984–1985	80	1,950	173	417	609	24.4	2.2	5.2	7.6	
Robert Horry	F	Alabama	4	1992–1996	295	9,408	1,568	919	3,109	31.9	5.3	3.1	10.5	
Danuel House	G	Texas A&M	4	2018–2022	154	4,057	582	213	1,420	26.3	3.8	1.4	9.2	
Dwight Howard^	C	SACA (GA)	3	2013–2016	183	5,899	2,132	279	2,919	32.2	11.7	1.5	16.0	
Juwan Howard	F	Michigan	3	2004–2007	221	6,284	1,351	337	2,300	28.4	6.1	1.5	10.4	
William Howard	F	Maryland	1	2019–2020	2	13	2	1	0	6.5	1.0	0.5	0.0	
Trevor Hudgins	G	Northwest Missouri State	1	2022–2023	5	28	0	3	9	5.6	0.0	0.6	1.8	
R. J. Hunter	G	Georgia State	1	2017–2018	5	45	5	3	19	9.0	1.0	0.6	3.8	

=== J ===
All-time roster
Player	Pos.	Pre-draft team	Yrs	Seasons	Statistics									Ref.
Player	Pos.	Pre-draft team	Yrs	Seasons	GP	MP	REB	AST	PTS	MPG	RPG	APG	PPG	Ref.
Aaron Jackson	G	Duquesne	1	2017–2018	1	35	3	1	8	35.0	3.0	1.0	8.0	
Bobby Jackson	G	Minnesota	1	2007–2008	26	498	71	63	228	19.2	2.7	2.4	8.8	
Demetrius Jackson	G	Notre Dame	1	2017–2018	12	63	11	5	8	5.3	0.9	0.4	0.7	
Jaren Jackson	G/F	Georgetown	1	1995–1996	4	33	3	0	8	8.3	0.8	0.0	2.0	
Jim Jackson	G	Ohio State	2	2003–2005	104	4,109	602	312	1,353	39.5	5.8	3.0	13.0	
Mark Jackson	G	St. John's	1	2003–2004	42	577	70	119	103	13.7	1.7	2.8	2.5	
Dave Jamerson	G/F	Ohio	2	1990–1992	85	580	73	60	304	6.8	0.9	0.7	3.6	
Henry James	F	St. Mary's (TX)	1	1995–1996	7	58	6	2	30	8.3	0.9	0.3	4.3	
Mike James	G	Duquesne	2	2004–2005; 2007–2008	60	1,229	138	132	551	20.5	2.3	2.2	9.2	
DaQuan Jeffries	G	Tulsa	1	2020–2021	13	261	42	16	64	20.1	3.2	1.2	4.9	
Jared Jeffries	F	Indiana	2	2009–2011	36	470	100	29	115	13.1	2.8	0.8	3.2	
Chris Jent	F	Ohio State	1	1993–1994	3	78	15	7	31	26.0	5.0	2.3	10.3	
Avery Johnson	G	Southern	1	1991–1992	49	772	45	166	251	15.8	0.9	3.4	5.1	
Buck Johnson	F	Alabama	6	1986–1992	432	10,562	1,565	767	4,139	24.4	3.6	1.8	9.6	
Eddie Johnson	G/F	Illinois	3	1996–1999	102	2,115	253	124	922	20.7	2.5	1.2	9.0	
Frank Johnson	G	Wake Forest	1	1988–1989	67	879	79	181	294	13.1	1.2	2.7	4.4	
George Johnson	C	Stephen F. Austin	2	1972–1974	45	407	106	12	97	9.0	2.4	0.3	2.2	
Joe Johnson	G/F	Arkansas	1	2017–2018	23	505	65	38	139	22.0	2.8	1.7	6.0	
John Johnson	F	Iowa	3	1975–1978	147	3,234	561	361	1,383	22.0	3.8	2.5	9.4	
Lee Johnson	F	East Texas State	1	1980–1981	10	80	20	1	17	8.0	2.0	0.1	1.7	
Nick Johnson	G	Arizona	1	2014–2015	28	262	39	11	74	9.4	1.4	0.4	2.6	
Bobby Jones	F	Washington	1	2007–2008	4	9	1	0	4	2.3	0.3	0.0	1.0	
Caldwell Jones	F/C	Albany State	2	1982–1984	163	4,946	1,250	294	1,577	30.3	7.7	1.8	9.7	
Charles Jones	F/C	Albany State	4	1994–1998	85	553	118	20	38	6.5	1.4	0.2	0.4	
Dwight Jones	F/C	Houston	4	1976–1980	258	5,208	1,325	225	1,893	20.2	5.1	0.9	7.3	
Major Jones	F	Albany State	5	1979–1984	327	4,645	1,195	200	1,514	14.2	3.7	0.6	4.6	
Mason Jones	G	Arkansas	1	2020–2021	26	307	51	39	152	11.8	2.0	1.5	5.8	
Nick Jones	G	Oregon	1	1967–1968	42	603	67	89	227	14.4	1.6	2.1	5.4	
Robin Jones	F/C	Saint Louis	1	1977–1978	12	66	14	2	26	5.5	1.2	0.2	2.2	
Terrence Jones	F	Kentucky	5	2012–2016; 2018–2019	180	4,292	1,028	179	1,847	23.8	5.7	1.0	10.3	

=== K to L ===
All-time roster
Player	Pos.	Pre-draft team	Yrs	Seasons	Statistics									Ref.
Player	Pos.	Pre-draft team	Yrs	Seasons	GP	MP	REB	AST	PTS	MPG	RPG	APG	PPG	Ref.
Frank Kaminsky	C	Wisconsin	1	2022–2023	10	59	16	11	18	5.9	1.6	1.1	1.8	
Goo Kennedy	F/C	TCU	1	1976–1977	32	277	51	6	65	8.7	1.6	0.2	2.0	
Toby Kimball	F/C	UConn	4	1967–1971	314	6,921	2,643	394	2,300	22.0	8.4	1.3	7.3	
Brandin Knight	G	Pittsburgh	1	2004–2005	1	3	0	1	0	3.0	0.0	1.0	0.0	
Brandon Knight	G	Kentucky	1	2018–2019	12	118	9	9	36	9.8	0.8	0.8	3.0	
Don Kojis^{+}	F	Marquette	3	1967–1970	206	7,256	1,874	468	4,037	35.2	9.1	2.3	19.6	
Kevin Kunnert	F/C	Iowa	5	1973–1978	341	8,699	2,891	532	3,550	25.5	8.5	1.6	10.4	
C. J. Kupec	F/C	Michigan	1	1977–1978	49	626	91	50	195	12.8	1.9	1.0	4.0	
Rodions Kurucs	F	(Spain) FC Barcelona	1	2020–2021	11	75	11	4	13	6.8	1.0	0.4	1.2	
Anthony Lamb	F	Vermont	1	2020–2021	24	415	70	23	133	17.3	2.9	1.0	5.5	
Maciej Lampe	C	(Spain) Real Madrid Baloncesto	1	2005–2006	4	12	5	0	4	3.0	1.3	0.0	1.0	
Jock Landale	C	St. Mary's (TX)	2	2023–2025	98	1,263	309	102	474	12.9	3.2	1.0	4.8	
Carl Landry	F	Purdue	3	2007–2010	163	3,593	836	100	1,819	22.0	5.1	0.6	11.2	
Dan Langhi	F	Vanderbilt	2	2000–2002	67	675	108	18	197	10.1	1.6	0.3	2.9	
Stu Lantz	G	Nebraska	4	1968–1972	318	10,048	1,242	1,067	4,947	31.6	3.9	3.4	15.6	
Ty Lawson	G	North Carolina	1	2015–2016	53	1,176	89	180	309	22.2	1.7	3.4	5.8	
Allen Leavell	G	Oklahoma City	10	1979–1989	700	16,248	1,164	3,339	6,684	23.2	1.7	4.8	9.5	
Courtney Lee	G	Western Kentucky	2	2010–2012	139	3,480	368	188	1,332	25.0	2.6	1.4	9.6	
Jeremy Lin	G	Harvard	2	2012–2014	153	4,694	434	791	1,985	30.7	2.8	5.2	13.0	
Randy Livingston	G	LSU	1	1996–1997	64	981	94	155	251	15.3	1.5	2.4	3.9	
Lewis Lloyd	G/F	Drake	5	1983–1987; 1989–1990	297	7,951	916	1,002	4,384	26.8	3.1	3.4	14.8	
Kyle Lowry	G	Villanova	4	2008–2012	218	6,332	847	1,212	2,515	29.0	3.9	5.6	11.5	
John Lucas	G	Maryland	5	1976–1978; 1984–1986; 1989–1990	325	9,680	792	2,358	3,756	29.8	2.4	7.3	11.6	
John Lucas III	G	Oklahoma State	2	2005–2007	60	490	41	45	184	8.2	0.7	0.8	3.1	
Tyronn Lue	G	Nebraska	1	2004–2005	21	479	40	58	125	22.8	1.9	2.8	6.0	

=== M ===
All-time roster
Player	Pos.	Pre-draft team	Yrs	Seasons	Statistics									Ref.
Player	Pos.	Pre-draft team	Yrs	Seasons	GP	MP	REB	AST	PTS	MPG	RPG	APG	PPG	Ref.
Scott Machado	G	Iona	1	2012–2013	6	21	1	6	8	3.5	0.2	1.0	1.3	
Sam Mack	G/F	Houston	3	1995–1997; 1998–1999	108	2,278	246	169	857	21.1	2.3	1.6	7.9	
Tito Maddox	G	Fresno State	1	2002–2003	9	35	7	5	11	3.9	0.8	0.6	1.2	
Moses Malone (#24)^	C	Petersburg HS (VA)	6	1976–1982	464	17,780	6,959	697	11,119	38.3	15.0	1.5	24.0	
Matt Maloney	G	Penn	3	1996–1999	175	4,789	312	543	1,457	27.4	1.8	3.1	8.3	
Jack Marin^{+}	G/F	Duke	2	1972–1974	128	4,121	605	412	1,998	32.2	4.7	3.2	15.6	
Boban Marjanović	C	(Serbia) Vršac	2	2022–2024	45	242	92	15	147	5.4	2.0	0.3	3.3	
Kevin Martin	G	Western Carolina	3	2009–2012	144	4,726	434	362	3,068	32.8	3.0	2.5	21.3	
Kenyon Martin Jr.	F	IMG Academy	3	2020–2023	206	5,016	991	272	2,154	24.3	4.8	1.3	10.5	
Tony Massenburg	F	Maryland	1	1999–2000	10	109	27	3	46	10.9	2.7	0.3	4.6	
Garrison Mathews	G	Lipscomb	2	2021–2023	110	2,314	252	87	864	21.0	2.3	0.8	7.9	
Cedric Maxwell	F	Charlotte	2	1986–1988	117	1,684	363	135	602	14.4	3.1	1.2	5.1	
Vernon Maxwell	G	Florida	6	1989–1995	402	13,299	1,182	1,730	6,002	33.1	2.9	4.3	14.9	
Luc Mbah a Moute	F	UCLA	2	2017–2018; 2019–2020	64	1,589	188	55	465	24.8	2.9	0.9	7.3	
Tim McCormick	C	Michigan	2	1988–1990	99	1,373	288	57	455	13.9	2.9	0.6	4.6	
Paul McCracken	G	Cal State Northridge	2	1972–1974	28	318	57	19	113	11.4	2.0	0.7	4.0	
Rodney McCray	G/F	Louisville	5	1983–1988	405	13,517	2,718	1,521	5,059	33.4	6.7	3.8	12.5	
K. J. McDaniels	G/F	Clemson	3	2014–2017	76	480	77	16	180	6.3	1.0	0.2	2.4	
Hank McDowell	F/C	Memphis	2	1984–1986	56	336	71	15	112	6.0	1.3	0.3	2.0	
Jon McGlocklin	G/F	Indiana	1	1967–1968	65	1,876	199	178	788	28.9	3.1	2.7	12.1	
Tracy McGrady^	G/F	MZCA (NC)	6	2004–2010	303	11,133	1,667	1,699	6,888	36.7	5.5	5.6	22.7	
Stan McKenzie	G/F	NYU	2	1972–1974	37	299	50	21	106	8.1	1.4	0.6	2.9	
Ben McLemore	G/F	Kansas	2	2019–2021	103	2,156	223	86	953	20.9	2.2	0.8	9.3	
McCoy McLemore	F/C	Drake	1	1971–1972	17	147	39	10	47	8.6	2.3	0.6	2.8	
Jack McVeigh	F	Nebraska	1	2024–2025	9	43	5	1	14	4.8	0.6	0.1	1.6	
Eric McWilliams	F	Long Beach State	1	1972–1973	44	245	60	5	86	5.6	1.4	0.1	2.0	
Cliff Meely	F/C	Colorado	5	1971–1976	298	6,190	1,658	389	2,594	20.8	5.6	1.3	8.7	
Pops Mensah-Bonsu	F	George Washington	1	2009–2010	4	13	4	1	5	3.3	1.0	0.3	1.3	
Joe Meriweather	F/C	Southern Illinois	1	1975–1976	81	2,042	516	82	830	25.2	6.4	1.0	10.2	
Larry Micheaux	F	Houston	1	1984–1985	39	394	99	17	165	10.1	2.5	0.4	4.2	
Anthony Miller	F	Michigan State	3	1998–2001	65	728	231	23	200	11.2	3.6	0.4	3.1	
Brad Miller	C	Purdue	1	2010–2011	60	1,015	222	145	382	16.9	3.7	2.4	6.4	
Dirk Minniefield	G	Kentucky	1	1986–1987	63	1,478	130	335	482	23.5	2.1	5.3	7.7	
Cuttino Mobley	G	Rhode Island	6	1998–2004	436	16,343	1,761	1,177	7,448	37.5	4.0	2.7	17.1	
Larry Moffett	F	UNLV	1	1977–1978	20	110	21	7	16	5.5	1.1	0.4	0.8	
Paul Mokeski	F/C	Kansas	1	1979–1980	12	113	29	2	29	9.4	2.4	0.2	2.4	
Otto Moore	F/C	UTPA	2	1972–1974	95	3,025	952	185	1,031	31.8	10.0	1.9	10.9	
Tracy Moore	G/F	Tulsa	2	1995–1997	35	427	48	26	190	12.2	1.4	0.7	5.4	
Marcus Morris	F	Kansas	2	2011–2013	71	1,280	235	50	505	18.0	3.3	0.7	7.1	
Terence Morris	F	Maryland	2	2001–2003	117	1,742	339	89	437	14.9	2.9	0.8	3.7	
Donatas Motiejūnas	F/C	(Italy) Benetton Treviso	4	2012–2016	214	4,074	848	236	1,676	19.0	4.0	1.1	7.8	
Calvin Murphy (#23)^	G	Niagara	13	1970–1983	1,002	30,607	2,103	4,402	17,949	30.5	2.1	4.4	17.9	
Tracy Murray	F	UCLA	1	1994–1995	25	203	22	5	88	8.1	0.9	0.2	3.5	
Dikembe Mutombo^	C	Georgetown	5	2004–2009	267	4,171	1,452	32	855	15.6	5.4	0.1	3.2	

=== N to P ===
All-time roster
Player	Pos.	Pre-draft team	Yrs	Seasons	Statistics									Ref.
Player	Pos.	Pre-draft team	Yrs	Seasons	GP	MP	REB	AST	PTS	MPG	RPG	APG	PPG	Ref.
Boštjan Nachbar	F	(Italy) Benetton Treviso	3	2002–2005	75	797	111	42	216	10.6	1.5	0.6	2.9	
Nenê	F/C	(Brazil) Vasco da Gama	3	2016–2019	161	2,502	581	136	1,100	15.5	3.6	0.8	6.8	
Chuck Nevitt	C	NC State	3	1982–1983; 1988–1990	52	301	84	4	92	5.8	1.6	0.1	1.8	
Mike Newlin	G/F	Utah	8	1971–1979	604	17,646	1,920	2,581	8,480	29.2	3.2	4.3	14.0	
Tristen Newton^{x}	G	UConn	1	2025–2026	1	12	3	0	12	12.0	3.0	0.0	12.0	
Daishen Nix	G	NBA G League Ignite	2	2021–2023	81	1,175	131	172	303	14.5	1.6	2.1	3.7	
Moochie Norris	G	West Florida	7	1999–2006	341	6,461	739	1,058	1,926	18.9	2.2	3.1	5.6	
Steve Novak	F	Marquette	2	2006–2008	70	455	61	12	186	6.5	0.9	0.2	2.7	
James Nunnally	F	UC Santa Barbara	1	2018–2019	2	38	1	2	9	19.0	0.5	1.0	4.5	
David Nwaba	F	Cal Poly	2	2020–2022	76	1,288	269	66	509	16.9	3.5	0.9	6.7	
Charles Oakley	F/C	Virginia Union	1	2003–2004	7	25	5	2	9	3.6	0.7	0.3	1.3	
Tim Ohlbrecht	C	(Germany) Telekom Baskets Bonn	1	2012–2013	3	12	1	1	3	4.0	0.3	0.3	1.0	
Josh Okogie^{x}	G	Georgia Tech	1	2025–2026	78	1,354	200	69	353	17.4	2.6	0.9	4.5	
Victor Oladipo	G	Indiana	1	2020–2021	20	669	95	99	424	33.5	4.8	5.0	21.2	
Hakeem Olajuwon (#34)^	C	Houston	17	1984–2001	1,177	42,844	13,382	2,992	26,511	36.4	11.4	2.5	22.5	
Jawann Oldham	C	Seattle	1	1981–1982	22	124	24	3	34	5.6	1.1	0.1	1.5	
Cameron Oliver	F	Nevada	1	2020–2021	4	87	21	5	43	21.8	5.3	1.3	10.8	
Kelly Olynyk	F/C	Gonzaga	1	2020–2021	27	840	228	112	513	31.1	8.4	4.1	19.0	
Chinanu Onuaku	F/C	Louisville	2	2016–2018	6	74	14	4	18	12.3	2.3	0.7	3.0	
Tom Owens	F/C	South Carolina	1	1976–1977	46	462	142	18	188	10.0	3.1	0.4	4.1	
Scott Padgett	F	Kentucky	3	2003–2005; 2006–2007	148	1,687	369	86	519	11.4	2.5	0.6	3.5	
Kostas Papanikolaou	F	(Greece) Olympiacos	1	2014–2015	43	795	118	85	182	18.5	2.7	2.0	4.2	
Chandler Parsons	F	Florida	3	2011–2014	213	7,345	1,113	701	3,002	34.5	5.2	3.3	14.1	
Patrick Patterson	F	Kentucky	3	2010–2013	163	3,570	707	145	1,362	21.9	4.3	0.9	8.4	
Justin Patton	C	Creighton	1	2020–2021	13	247	49	14	70	19.0	3.8	1.1	5.4	
Chris Paul	G	Wake Forest	2	2017–2019	116	3,704	578	930	1,987	31.9	5.0	8.0	17.1	
Billy Paultz	F/C	St. John's	4	1979–1983	240	4,141	1,003	273	1,334	17.3	4.2	1.1	5.6	
Curtis Perry	F	Missouri State	2	1970–1972	43	455	152	27	141	10.6	3.5	0.6	3.3	
Jim Petersen	F/C	Minnesota	4	1984–1988	293	6,574	1,536	347	2,232	22.4	5.2	1.2	7.6	
Richard Petruška	F/C	UCLA	1	1993–1994	22	92	31	1	53	4.2	1.4	0.0	2.4	
Eric Piatkowski	G/F	Nebraska	1	2003–2004	49	703	73	26	201	14.3	1.5	0.5	4.1	
Scottie Pippen^	G/F	Central Arkansas	1	1998–1999	50	2,011	323	293	726	40.2	6.5	5.9	14.5	
Kevin Porter Jr.	G	USC	3	2020–2023	146	4,766	680	878	2,510	32.6	4.7	6.0	17.2	
James Posey	G/F	Xavier	1	2002–2003	58	1,646	281	106	541	28.4	4.8	1.8	9.3	
Josh Powell	F	NC State	1	2013–2014	1	19	5	0	4	19.0	5.0	0.0	4.0	
Brent Price	G	Oklahoma	3	1996–1999	137	2,528	214	370	824	18.5	1.6	2.7	6.0	
Pablo Prigioni	G	(Argentina) Obras Sanitarias	1	2014–2015	24	402	39	67	73	16.8	1.6	2.8	3.0	

=== Q to S ===
All-time roster
Player	Pos.	Pre-draft team	Yrs	Seasons	Statistics									Ref.
Player	Pos.	Pre-draft team	Yrs	Seasons	GP	MP	REB	AST	PTS	MPG	RPG	APG	PPG	Ref.
Tim Quarterman	G	LSU	1	2017–2018	3	13	3	1	4	4.3	1.0	0.3	1.3	
Trevelin Queen	G	New Mexico State	1	2021–2022	10	74	16	4	43	7.4	1.6	0.4	4.3	
Ed Ratleff	G/F	Long Beach State	5	1973–1978	338	8,433	1,363	896	2,813	24.9	4.0	2.7	8.3	
Eldridge Recasner	G	Washington	1	1995–1996	63	1,275	144	170	436	20.2	2.3	2.7	6.9	
Robert Reid	G/F	St. Mary's (TX)	10	1977–1982; 1983–1988	762	21,718	3,706	2,253	8,823	28.5	4.9	3.0	11.6	
Cameron Reynolds	G	Tulane	1	2020–2021	2	34	5	2	13	17.0	2.5	1.0	6.5	
Rodrick Rhodes	G/F	USC	2	1997–1999	61	1,103	74	111	346	18.1	1.2	1.8	5.7	
Glen Rice	F	Michigan	2	2001–2003	82	2,138	201	96	728	26.1	2.5	1.2	8.9	
Eric Riley	C	Michigan	1	1993–1994	47	219	59	9	88	4.7	1.3	0.2	1.9	
Pat Riley^	G/F	Kentucky	3	1967–1970	172	2,764	346	359	1,312	16.1	2.0	2.1	7.6	
Ron Riley	F	USC	3	1973–1976	178	3,048	805	234	855	17.1	4.5	1.3	4.8	
Austin Rivers	G	Duke	2	2018–2020	115	2,939	266	222	1,004	25.6	2.3	1.9	8.7	
Stanley Roberts	C	LSU	1	1998–1999	6	33	11	0	14	5.5	1.8	0.0	2.3	
Larry Robinson	G/F	Centenary	1	1993–1994	6	55	10	6	25	9.2	1.7	1.0	4.2	
Thomas Robinson	F	Kansas	1	2012–2013	19	247	77	10	86	13.0	4.1	0.5	4.5	
David Roddy	F	Colorado State	1	2024–2025	3	35	5	2	13	11.7	1.7	0.7	4.3	
Carlos Rogers	F/C	Tennessee State	2	1999–2001	92	1,645	414	51	601	17.9	4.5	0.6	6.5	
Tree Rollins	C	Clemson	2	1991–1993	101	944	231	25	149	9.3	2.3	0.2	1.5	
Ralph Sampson^	F/C	Virginia	5	1983–1988	305	10,674	3,189	827	5,995	35.0	10.5	2.7	19.7	
Jermaine Samuels	F	Villanova	1	2023–2024	14	60	13	3	20	4.3	0.9	0.2	1.4	
Dennis Schröder	G	(Germany) Löwen Braunschweig	1	2021–2022	15	404	50	88	163	26.9	3.3	5.9	10.9	
Luis Scola	F	(Spain) Saski Baskonia	5	2007–2012	386	11,662	2,984	723	5,597	30.2	7.7	1.9	14.5	
Thabo Sefolosha	G/F	(Italy) Pallacanestro Biella	1	2019–2020	41	436	93	25	92	10.6	2.3	0.6	2.2	
Alperen Şengün*	C	(Turkey) Beşiktaş	5	2021–2026	358	10,499	3,086	1,605	6,049	29.3	8.6	4.5	16.9	
Reed Sheppard^{x}	G	Kentucky	2	2024–2026	134	2,801	316	352	1,339	20.9	2.4	2.6	10.0	
Purvis Short	G/F	Jackson State	2	1987–1989	146	3,106	401	269	1,641	21.3	2.7	1.8	11.2	
John Shumate	F/C	Notre Dame	1	1979–1980	29	332	79	23	101	11.4	2.7	0.8	3.5	
Iman Shumpert	G	Georgia Tech	1	2018–2019	20	382	54	21	91	19.1	2.7	1.1	4.6	
Alexey Shved	G	(Russia) CSKA Moscow	1	2014–2015	9	59	4	3	29	6.6	0.4	0.3	3.2	
Larry Siegfried	F	Ohio State	2	1970–1972	63	1,896	217	366	470	30.1	3.4	5.8	7.5	
Bingo Smith	G/F	Tulsa	1	1969–1970	75	1,198	328	75	550	16.0	4.4	1.0	7.3	
Greg Smith	F	Western Kentucky	2	1971–1973	58	1,560	330	164	504	26.9	5.7	2.8	8.7	
Greg Smith	C	Fresno State	3	2011–2014	89	1,279	368	26	473	14.4	4.1	0.3	5.3	
Ish Smith	G	Wake Forest	1	2010–2011	28	329	42	64	74	11.8	1.5	2.3	2.6	
Josh Smith	F	Oak Hill Academy (VA)	2	2014–2016	78	1,825	395	193	811	23.4	5.1	2.5	10.4	
Kenny Smith	G	North Carolina	6	1990–1996	468	13,712	889	2,457	5,910	29.3	1.9	5.3	12.6	
Larry Smith	F/C	Alcorn State	3	1989–1992	200	4,023	1,417	190	594	20.1	7.1	1.0	3.0	
Jabari Smith Jr.^{x}	F	Auburn	4	2022–2026	289	9,296	2,113	425	3,967	32.2	7.3	1.5	13.7	
Kirk Snyder	G	Nevada	2	2006–2008	48	644	95	47	226	13.4	2.0	1.0	4.7	
Ray Spalding	C	Louisville	1	2020–2021	2	19	4	0	4	9.5	2.0	0.0	2.0	
Vassilis Spanoulis	G	(Greece) Maroussi	1	2006–2007	31	272	22	28	85	8.8	0.7	0.9	2.7	
Larry Spriggs	F	Howard	1	1981–1982	4	37	6	4	14	9.3	1.5	1.0	3.5	
Joe Stephens	F	Little Rock	2	1996–1998	9	46	9	1	30	5.1	1.0	0.1	3.3	
Rod Strickland	G	DePaul	1	2004–2005	16	196	27	39	28	12.3	1.7	2.4	1.8	
John Stroud	F	Ole Miss	1	1980–1981	9	88	13	9	25	9.8	1.4	1.0	2.8	
Bob Sura	G	Florida State	1	2004–2005	61	1,922	337	317	626	31.5	5.5	5.2	10.3	
Stromile Swift	F	LSU	1	2005–2006	66	1,344	291	25	586	20.4	4.4	0.4	8.9	

=== T ===
All-time roster
Player	Pos.	Pre-draft team	Yrs	Seasons	Statistics									Ref.
Player	Pos.	Pre-draft team	Yrs	Seasons	GP	MP	REB	AST	PTS	MPG	RPG	APG	PPG	Ref.
Žan Tabak	C	(Croatia) Split	1	1994–1995	37	182	57	4	75	4.9	1.5	0.1	2.0	
Jae'Sean Tate^{x}	F	Ohio State	6	2020–2026	342	6,800	1,299	620	2,578	19.9	3.8	1.8	7.5	
Isaiah Taylor	G	Texas	1	2016–2017	4	52	3	3	3	13.0	0.8	0.8	0.8	
Jeff Taylor	G	Texas Tech	1	1982–1983	44	774	78	110	158	17.6	1.8	2.5	3.6	
Jermaine Taylor	G	UCF	2	2009–2011	39	380	55	18	167	9.7	1.4	0.5	4.3	
Maurice Taylor	F	Michigan	4	2000–2001; 2002–2005	249	6,335	1,164	330	2,619	25.4	4.7	1.3	10.5	
Terry Teagle	G/F	Baylor	3	1982–1984; 1992–1993	143	2,349	275	215	1,106	16.4	1.9	1.5	7.7	
Garrett Temple	G	LSU	1	2009–2010	9	118	14	7	45	13.1	1.6	0.8	5.0	
Jason Terry	G	Arizona	2	2014–2016	149	2,899	200	250	963	19.5	1.3	1.7	6.5	
Hasheem Thabeet	C	UConn	2	2010–2012	7	27	7	0	6	3.9	1.0	0.0	0.9	
Daniel Theis	C	(Germany) ratiopharm Ulm	1	2021–2022	26	584	130	20	218	22.5	5.0	0.8	8.4	
Brodric Thomas	G	Truman	1	2020–2021	4	24	3	4	10	6.0	0.8	1.0	2.5	
Kenny Thomas	F	New Mexico	4	1999–2003	238	6,687	1,507	366	2,334	28.1	6.3	1.5	9.8	
Khyri Thomas	G	Creighton	1	2020–2021	5	153	18	25	82	30.6	3.6	5.0	16.4	
Amen Thompson^{x}	F	Overtime Elite	3	2023–2026	210	6,566	1,587	848	3,005	31.3	7.6	4.0	14.3	
Bernard Thompson	G/F	Fresno State	1	1988–1989	23	222	28	13	62	9.7	1.2	0.6	2.7	
Marcus Thornton	G	LSU	1	2015–2016	47	885	115	66	472	18.8	2.4	1.4	10.0	
Otis Thorpe^{+}	F/C	Providence	7	1988–1995	518	18,631	5,010	1,338	8,177	36.0	9.7	2.6	15.8	
Sedale Threatt	G	West Virginia Tech	1	1996–1997	21	334	24	40	70	15.9	1.1	1.9	3.3	
Rudy Tomjanovich (#45)^{+}	F	Michigan	11	1970–1981	768	25,714	6,198	1,573	13,383	33.5	8.1	2.0	17.4	
Óscar Torres	F	(Venezuela) Marinos	1	2001–2002	65	1,075	122	40	389	16.5	1.9	0.6	6.0	
John Trapp	F	UNLV	3	1968–1971	177	3,247	868	192	1,305	18.3	4.9	1.1	7.4	
Jake Tsakalidis	C	(Greece) AEK Athens	1	2006–2007	13	132	40	3	30	10.2	3.1	0.2	2.3	
P. J. Tucker	F	Texas	4	2017–2021	268	8,509	1,560	333	1,744	31.8	5.8	1.2	6.5	
Andre Turner	G	Memphis	1	1987–1988	12	99	8	23	35	8.3	0.7	1.9	2.9	
John Turner	F	Phillips	1	1991–1992	42	345	78	12	117	8.2	1.9	0.3	2.8	

=== V to Z ===
All-time roster
Player	Pos.	Pre-draft team	Yrs	Seasons	Statistics									Ref.
Player	Pos.	Pre-draft team	Yrs	Seasons	GP	MP	REB	AST	PTS	MPG	RPG	APG	PPG	Ref.
John Vallely	G	UCLA	1	1971–1972	40	256	21	28	115	6.4	0.5	0.7	2.9	
Fred VanVleet^{x}	G	Wichita State	2	2023–2025	133	4,795	499	922	2,114	36.1	3.8	6.9	15.9	
Von Wafer	G	Florida State	1	2008–2009	63	1,225	113	71	610	19.4	1.8	1.1	9.7	
Granville Waiters	C	Ohio State	1	1985–1986	43	156	28	8	27	3.6	0.7	0.2	0.6	
Jimmy Walker	G	Providence	2	1972–1974	84	3,117	270	446	1,468	37.1	3.2	5.3	17.5	
Wally Walker	F	Virginia	2	1982–1984	140	2,863	465	254	1,041	20.5	3.3	1.8	7.4	
John Wall	G	Kentucky	1	2020–2021	40	1,288	129	275	823	32.2	3.2	6.9	20.6	
Charlie Ward	G	Florida State	1	2004–2005	14	360	39	43	75	25.7	2.8	3.1	5.4	
Jim Ware	F	Oklahoma City	1	1967–1968	30	228	77	7	73	7.6	2.6	0.2	2.4	
TyTy Washington Jr.	G	Kentucky	1	2022–2023	31	433	45	47	145	14.0	1.5	1.5	4.7	
Slick Watts	G	Xavier (LS)	1	1978–1979	61	1,046	103	243	225	17.1	1.7	4.0	3.7	
Clarence Weatherspoon	F	Southern Miss	2	2003–2005	77	1,177	276	34	330	15.3	3.6	0.4	4.3	
Brianté Weber	G	VCU	1	2017–2018	13	118	18	13	26	9.1	1.4	1.0	2.0	
Bonzi Wells	G/F	Ball State	2	2006–2008	79	1,714	380	111	686	21.7	4.8	1.4	8.7	
Owen Wells	F	Detroit Mercy	1	1974–1975	33	214	35	22	99	6.5	1.1	0.7	3.0	
David Wesley	G	Baylor	2	2004–2006	125	4,212	321	360	1,289	33.7	2.6	2.9	10.3	
Russell Westbrook^{+}	G	UCLA	1	2019–2020	57	2,049	451	401	1,553	35.9	7.9	7.0	27.2	
James White	G/F	Cincinnati	1	2008–2009	4	11	0	1	7	2.8	0.0	0.3	1.8	
Rudy White	G	Arizona State	4	1975–1978; 1979–1980	108	977	109	92	323	9.0	1.0	0.9	3.0	
Cam Whitmore	F	Villanova	2	2023–2025	98	1,707	331	82	1,056	17.4	3.4	0.8	10.8	
Mitchell Wiggins	G	Florida State	4	1984–1987; 1989–1990	258	5,413	813	400	2,648	21.0	3.2	1.6	10.3	
Mike Wilks	G	Rice	1	2003–2004	26	145	16	17	50	5.6	0.6	0.7	1.9	
Art Williams	G	Cal Poly Pomona	3	1967–1970	238	5,271	942	1,418	1,668	22.1	4.0	6.0	7.0	
Bernie Williams	G	La Salle	2	1969–1971	128	1,936	240	278	890	15.1	1.9	2.2	7.0	
Justin Williams	F	Wyoming	1	2007–2008	1	6	1	0	3	6.0	1.0	0.0	3.0	
Lou Williams	G	South Gwinnett HS (GA)	1	2016–2017	23	591	70	56	343	25.7	3.0	2.4	14.9	
Nate Williams	G	Buffalo	2	2023–2025	42	276	36	16	128	6.6	0.9	0.4	3.0	
Terrence Williams	F	Louisville	2	2010–2012	23	265	43	17	93	11.5	1.9	0.7	4.0	
Troy Williams	F	Indiana	2	2016–2018	10	156	28	7	63	15.6	2.8	0.7	6.3	
Walt Williams	G/F	Maryland	3	1999–2002	196	4,559	713	323	1,876	23.3	3.6	1.6	9.6	
Kevin Willis	F/C	Michigan State	3	1996–1998; 2001–2002	208	5,357	1,539	163	2,462	25.8	7.4	0.8	11.8	
Bill Willoughby	F/C	Dwight Morrow HS (NJ)	2	1980–1982	124	2,620	491	139	888	21.1	4.0	1.1	7.2	
D. J. Wilson	F	Michigan	1	2020–2021	23	328	87	20	140	14.3	3.8	0.9	6.1	
Kyle Wiltjer	F	Gonzaga	1	2016–2017	14	44	10	2	13	3.1	0.7	0.1	0.9	
Kennard Winchester	G/F	Averett	3	1990–1993	107	964	116	38	384	9.0	1.1	0.4	3.6	
Dave Wohl	G	Penn	4	1973–1977	165	2,933	190	576	828	17.8	1.2	3.5	5.0	
Christian Wood	C	UNLV	2	2020–2022	109	3,420	1,081	226	2,078	31.4	9.9	2.1	19.1	
David Wood	F	Nevada	1	1990–1991	82	1,421	246	94	432	17.3	3.0	1.1	5.3	
Loren Woods	F/C	Arizona	1	2007–2008	7	17	1	2	6	2.4	0.1	0.3	0.9	
Mike Woodson	G/F	Indiana	3	1988–1991	153	3,356	293	282	1,493	21.9	1.9	1.8	9.8	
Brandan Wright	F/C	North Carolina	1	2017–2018	1	15	2	0	4	15.0	2.0	0.0	4.0	
Yao Ming (#11)^	C	(China) Shanghai Sharks	8	2002–2009; 2010–2011	486	15,818	4,494	769	9,247	32.5	9.2	1.6	19.0	
Zhou Qi	F/C	(China) Xinjiang Flying Tigers	2	2017–2019	19	125	22	2	24	6.6	1.2	0.1	1.3	
