= Márgaro Gámiz =

Cuban baseball player (born 1905)

- Catcher
- Born: 1905; Havana, Cuba
- Threw: Right

Negro league baseball debut
- 1926, for the Harrisburg Giants

Last appearance
- 1929, for the Baltimore Black Sox
- Stats at Baseball Reference

Teams
- Harrisburg Giants (1926–1927); Philadelphia Tigers (1928); Cuban Stars (East) (1929); Baltimore Black Sox (1929)

Márgaro Gámiz (1905 – death unknown), nicknamed "Harry" and "Mazio", was a Cuban professional baseball catcher in the Negro leagues in the 1920s.

A native of Havana, Cuba, Gámiz made his Negro leagues debut in 1926 with the Harrisburg Giants. He played for Harrisburg again the following season, then went on to play for the Philadelphia Tigers, Cuban Stars (East), and Baltimore Black Sox.
