= Cleo Smith (baseball) =

American baseball infielder

- Infielder
- Born: August 10, 1899; Gloucester County, Virginia, U.S.
- Died: June 30, 1978 (aged 78); Washington, D.C., U.S.
- Batted: Left Threw: Right

Negro league baseball debut
- 1922, for the Baltimore Black Sox

Last appearance
- 1928, for the Philadelphia Tigers

Teams
- Baltimore Black Sox (1922–1923, 1928); Lincoln Giants (1924); Newark Stars (1926); Homestead Grays (1926); Harrisburg Giants (1928); Philadelphia Tigers (1928)

Cleophas "Cleo" Smith (August 10, 1899 – June 30, 1978) was an American professional baseball infielder in the Negro leagues. He played with several teams from 1922 to 1928.
