= Lewis Anderson =

Lewis Anderson may refer to:

- Lewis Anderson (runner) (1890–1958), American middle-distance runner
- Lewis Anderson (baseball), American baseball catcher in the Negro leagues
- Lewis Edward Anderson (1912–2007), American botanist
- Lew Anderson (1922–2006), American actor and musician
