= Wilbert Pritchett =

American baseball player

- Pitcher
- Born: February 10, 1897; Ridgely, Maryland, U.S.
- Died: August 5, 1955 (aged 58); Philadelphia, Pennsylvania, U.S.
- Threw: Left

Negro league baseball debut
- 1924, for the Hilldale Club

Last appearance
- 1932, for the Newark Browns

Teams
- Hilldale Club (1924); Harrisburg Giants (1925–1926); Baltimore Black Sox (1926–1927); Philadelphia Tigers (1928); Hilldale Club (1929–1930); Newark Browns (1932)

Wilbert Ira Pritchett (February 10, 1897 – August 5, 1955), also known as "Wilbur", was an American Negro league baseball pitcher between 1924 and 1932.

A native of Ridgely, Maryland, Pritchett made his Negro leagues debut in 1924 with the Hilldale Club. He went on to play for the Harrisburg Giants, Baltimore Black Sox, and Philadelphia Tigers before returning to Hilldale in 1929 and 1930. Pritchett finished his career with a short stint with the Newark Browns in 1932. He died in Philadelphia, Pennsylvania in 1955 at age 58.
