= William Cradock =

William Cradock, or Craddock could refer to:

- William Cradock (archdeacon of Lewes) (fl. 1512–1516), English pre-Reformation priest
- William Cradock (dean of St Patrick's) (1741–1793), English Anglican priest, Archdeacon of Kilmore
- William Craddock (baseball), Negro league baseball player
- William J. Craddock (1946–2004), American author
