= James Womack =

James Womack may refer to:

- James Womack (baseball), African-American baseball player
- James E. Womack (1941–2023), American biologist
- James P. Womack, research director of the International Motor Vehicle Program
