= Henry Gillespie (baseball) =

American baseball player

- Pitcher
- Born: July 14, 1896; Cheraw, South Carolina, U.S.
- Died: June 1, 1963 (aged 66); Philadelphia, Pennsylvania, U.S.
- Threw: Right

ECL debut
- 1925, for the Bacharach Giants

Last ECL appearance
- 1928, for the Philadelphia Tigers

ECL statistics
- Win–loss record: 4–12
- Earned run average: 6.19
- Strikeouts: 51
- Stats at Baseball Reference

Teams
- Bacharach Giants (1925); Lincoln Giants (1925); Harrisburg Giants (1926); Bacharach Giants (1927); Philadelphia Tigers (1928)

Henry Gillespie (July 14, 1896 – June 1, 1963) was an American Negro league baseball pitcher in the 1920s and 1930s.

A native of Cheraw, South Carolina, Gillespie made his Negro leagues debut in 1921 with the Hilldale Club. He went on to play for several teams, and finished his career in 1932 with the Bacharach Giants. Gillespie died in Philadelphia, Pennsylvania in 1963 at age 66.
