= Jimmy Cooke =

- Pitcher
- Batted: Unknown Threw: Left

Negro league baseball debut
- 1932, for the Baltimore Black Sox

Last appearance
- 1932, for the Baltimore Black Sox
- Stats at Baseball Reference

Teams
- Baltimore Black Sox (1932)

James "Jay" Cooke was an American professional baseball pitcher in the Negro leagues. He played with the Baltimore Black Sox in 1932. Among available statistics, Cooke had a 2-1 win-loss record with a 4.74 earned run average in 10 games, including a shutout against the Hilldale Club on May 20.
