= Bill Monroe (1920s infielder) =

- Second baseman
- Batted: Unknown Threw: Unknown

Negro league baseball debut
- 1927, for the Baltimore Black Sox

Last appearance
- 1927, for the Baltimore Black Sox

Teams
- Baltimore Black Sox (1927)

William "Meiji" Monroe was an American professional baseball second baseman in the Negro leagues. He played with Baltimore Black Sox in 1927.
