= Pearley Johnson =

American baseball player

- Outfielder
- Born: January 1, 1905; La Plata, Maryland, U.S.
- Died: December 19, 1991 (aged 86); Boston, Massachusetts, U.S.
- Batted: Right Threw: Right

Negro league baseball debut
- 1926, for the Baltimore Black Sox

Last appearance
- 1933, for the Baltimore Black Sox
- Stats at Baseball Reference

Teams
- Baltimore Black Sox (1926–1927); Harrisburg Giants (1928); Baltimore Black Sox (1933)

Pearley F. Johnson (January 1, 1905 – December 19, 1991), nicknamed "Tubby", was an American Negro league baseball outfielder between 1926 and 1933.

A native of La Plata, Maryland, Johnson made his Negro leagues debut in 1926 with the Baltimore Black Sox. He played for Baltimore the following season and went on to play for the Harrisburg Giants in 1928 before finishing his career in Baltimore in 1933. Johnson died in Boston, Massachusetts, in 1991 at age 86.
