= Scrappy Brown =

American baseball player

- Shortstop
- Born: July 18, 1899; Sparrows Point, Maryland, U.S.
- Died: September 13, 1951 (aged 52); Washington, D.C., U.S.
- Threw: Right

Negro league baseball debut
- 1920, for the Hilldale Club

Last appearance
- 1930, for the Brooklyn Royal Giants
- Stats at Baseball Reference

Teams
- Hilldale Club (1920); Baltimore Black Sox (1921–1922); Harrisburg Giants (1922); Homestead Grays (1924); Baltimore Black Sox (1926–1928); Bacharach Giants (1929); Brooklyn Royal Giants (1929–1930)

Malcolm Elmore Brown (July 18, 1899 – September 13, 1951), nicknamed "Scrappy", was an American Negro league baseball shortstop between 1920 and 1930.

A native of Sparrows Point, Maryland, Brown made his Negro leagues debut in 1920 with the Hilldale Club. He went on to play for several teams, including five seasons with the Baltimore Black Sox, and finished his career with a two-year stint with the Brooklyn Royal Giants in 1929 and 1930. Brown died in Washington, D.C., in 1951 at age 52.
