= Wyman Smith =

American baseball player

- Outfielder
- Born: December 2, 1898; Baltimore, Maryland, U.S.
- Died: August 16, 1953 (aged 54); Baltimore, Maryland, U.S.
- Batted: Left Threw: Left

Negro league baseball debut
- 1923, for the Baltimore Black Sox

Last appearance
- 1924, for the Baltimore Black Sox

Teams
- Baltimore Black Sox (1923–1924)

Wyman Chester Smith (December 2, 1898 – August 16, 1953), nicknamed "Subway", was an American Negro league outfielder in the 1920s.

A native of Baltimore, Maryland, Smith made his Negro leagues debut in 1920 for the Baltimore Black Sox. He went on to play four more seasons with the Black Sox, through 1924. Smith died in Baltimore in 1953 at age 54.
