= Jim Busby (third baseman) =

American baseball player

- Third baseman
- Born: November 28, 1900; Benton Harbor, Michigan
- Died: October 2, 1960 (aged 59)

Negro league baseball debut
- 1933, for the Detroit Stars

Last appearance
- 1933, for the Detroit Stars

Teams
- Detroit Stars (1933)

James Alfred Busby (November 28, 1900 – October 2, 1960) was an American Negro league third baseman in the 1930s.

A native of Benton Harbor, Michigan, Busby was the brother of fellow Negro leaguer Maurice Busby. He played for the Detroit Stars in 1933. Busby died in 1960 at age 59.
