= George Grayer =

American baseball player

- First baseman
- Born: May 10, 1894; Baltimore, Maryland, U.S.

Negro league baseball debut
- 1920, for the Baltimore Black Sox

Last appearance
- 1921, for the Baltimore Black Sox

Teams
- Baltimore Black Sox (1920–1921)

George A. Grayer (May 10, 1894 – death date unknown) was an American Negro league first baseman in the 1920s.

A native of Baltimore, Maryland, Grayer played for the Baltimore Black Sox in 1920 and 1921. In 11 recorded games, he posted eight hits and five RBI in 40 plate appearances.
