= Eli Juran =

American baseball player (1902–1955)

- First baseman / Pitcher
- Born: November 5, 1902; Pratt City, Alabama, U.S.
- Died: June 19, 1955 (aged 52); Amsterdam, New York, U.S.
- Batted: Unknown Threw: Unknown

Negro league baseball debut
- 1923, for the Birmingham Black Barons

Last appearance
- 1932, for the Baltimore Black Sox

Teams
- Birmingham Black Barons (1923); Newark Stars (1926); Washington Pilots (1923); Hilldale Club (1932); Baltimore Black Sox (1932)

Edward Eli Juran (November 5, 1902 – June 19, 1955) was an American professional baseball first baseman and pitcher in the Negro leagues. He played from 1923 to 1932 with the Birmingham Black Barons, Newark Stars, Washington Pilots, Hilldale Club, and Baltimore Black Sox. He played under the name "Eddie Durant" in the 1930s. His brother, Johnny Juran, also played with the Black Barons in 1923 and 1924.
