= Babe Melton =

- Center fielder/Second baseman
- Born: October 2, 1897; Rowan County, North Carolina, U.S.
- Died: February 15, 1962 (aged 48); Washington, D.C., U.S.
- Batted: Right Threw: Right

Negro league baseball debut
- 1926, for the Cleveland Elites

Last appearance
- 1929, for the Baltimore Black Sox

Teams
- Cleveland Elites (1926); Cleveland Tigers (1928); Lincoln Giants (1929); Baltimore Black Sox (1929)

Elbert Grant "Babe" Melton (October 2, 1897 – February 15, 1962) was an American Negro league baseball center fielder and second baseman. He played from 1926 to 1929 with the Cleveland Elites, Cleveland Tigers, Lincoln Giants, and Baltimore Black Sox.
