= Obie Lackey =

American baseball player

- Infielder
- Born: October 6, 1903; Stony Point, North Carolina, U.S.
- Died: December 1979; Philadelphia, Pennsylvania, U.S.
- Batted: Right Threw: Right

Negro league baseball debut
- 1929, for the Homestead Grays

Last appearance
- 1943, for the New York Black Yankees
- Stats at Baseball Reference

Teams
- Homestead Grays (1929); Hilldale Club (1929–1930); Brooklyn Royal Giants (1931); Hilldale Club (1932); Bacharach Giants (1932–1934); Baltimore Black Sox (1933); Pittsburgh Crawfords (1933); Philadelphia Stars (1935–1937); Bacharach Giants (1936); Homestead Grays (1938); New York Black Yankees (1943)

Obie Ezekiel Lackey (October 6, 1903 – December 1979) was an American Negro league infielder between 1929 and 1943.

A native of Stony Point, North Carolina, Lackey made his Negro leagues debut in 1929 for the Homestead Grays. He went on to play for several teams, including the Hilldale Club and Philadelphia Stars, and finished his career in 1943 with a short stint with the New York Black Yankees. Lackey died in Philadelphia, Pennsylvania in 1979 at age 76.
