= Luke Archer =

American baseball player

- Pitcher
- Born: June 9, 1899; Due West, South Carolina, U.S.
- Died: December 9, 1988 (aged 89); St. Augustine, Florida, U.S.
- Batted: Unknown Threw: Unknown

Negro league baseball debut
- 1919, for the Lincoln Giants

Last appearance
- 1922, for the Baltimore Black Sox

Teams
- Lincoln Giants (1919-1920); Baltimore Black Sox (1922)

Lucius Williams Archer (June 9, 1899 – December 9, 1988) was an American professional baseball pitcher in the Negro leagues. He played with the Lincoln Giants in 1919 and 1920 and the Baltimore Black Sox in 1922.
