= Charley Thomas (baseball) =

American baseball player

- Catcher

Negro league baseball debut
- 1920, for the Baltimore Black Sox

Last appearance
- 1922, for the Baltimore Black Sox

Teams
- Baltimore Black Sox (1920–1922)

Charles Thomas was a Negro league catcher in the 1920s.

Thomas made his Negro leagues debut in 1920 with the Baltimore Black Sox. He went on to play three seasons with Baltimore through 1922.
