= Red Bradley =

American baseball player

- Pitcher
- Batted: Unknown Threw: Unknown

Negro league baseball debut
- 1927, for the Baltimore Black Sox

Last appearance
- 1927, for the Baltimore Black Sox
- Stats at Baseball Reference

Teams
- Baltimore Black Sox (1927)

Red Bradley was an American professional baseball pitcher in the Negro leagues. He played with the Baltimore Black Sox in 1927.
