= Alex Albritton =

American baseball player

- Pitcher
- Born: February 12, 1892; Live Oak, Florida, U.S.
- Died: February 3, 1940 (aged 47); Philadelphia, Pennsylvania, U.S.
- Batted: Left Threw: Right

Negro league baseball debut
- 1918, for the Bacharach Giants

Last appearance
- 1925, for the Wilmington Potomacs
- Stats at Baseball Reference

Teams
- Bacharach Giants (1918); Pittsburgh Colored Stars of Buffalo (1920); Washington Braves (1921); Hilldale Club (1921); Baltimore Black Sox (1922-1923); Washington/Wilmington Potomacs (1923-1925); Brooklyn Cuban Giants (1924)

Alexander C. Albritton (February 12, 1892 (Note: Albritton's birth date appears as February 1892 in the 1900 United States census, while it is listed as February 12, 1894 in his World War I draft registration card.) – February 3, 1940) was an American professional baseball pitcher in the Negro leagues. He played with multiple teams from 1918 to 1925.

== Early life ==
Albritton was born in Live Oak, Florida, on February 12 of either 1892 or 1894, the son of D. W. and Charlotte Albritton.

At some point after 1900, his family moved to Ben Hill County, Georgia. Albritton later married a woman named Marie and they lived in both Florida and Philadelphia before he began his baseball career.

== Baseball career ==
Albritton appeared in at least one game for the Bacharach Giants in 1918, appearing in relief and allowing eight earned runs in 2.1 innings.

In 1920, Albritton played with the Pittsburgh Colored Stars of Buffalo before he was acquired by the Washington Braves in April 1921, for whom he played with through at least mid-May. By June 1921, he had joined the Hilldale Club.

Albritton pitched for the Baltimore Black Sox in 1922 and remained with the club when they joined the Eastern Colored League in 1923. By May 1923, he was pitching for the Washington Potomacs, and would remain with the club, now playing in Wilmington, Delaware, through 1925. In between appearances with the Potomacs, Albritton also pitched for the Brooklyn Cuban Giants in 1924.

By 1925, Albritton had earned the nickname "war horse" for his willingness to pitch as much as four times in a week.

== Death ==
Albritton was beaten to death at Philadelphia State Hospital at Byberry in 1940. According to the Republican Herald, witnesses testified that Albritton attacked attendant Frank Weinand, who then subdued Albritton, ultimately resulting in his death. Weinand was arrested and charged with homicide, but was cleared of any wrongdoing.

While his death certificate lists his burial location as Eden Cemetery in Collingdale, Pennsylvania, cemetery officials could find no record of anyone matching his description buried in 1940 or 1941.
