= Maurice Busby =

American baseball player

- Pitcher
- Born: March 31, 1892; Benton Harbor, Michigan, U.S.
- Died: November 3, 1945 (aged 53); Indianapolis, Indiana, U.S.
- Batted: Unknown Threw: Left

Negro league baseball debut
- 1921, for the Bacharach Giants

Last appearance
- 1922, for the Baltimore Black Sox

Teams
- Bacharach Giants (1921); All Cubans (1921); Baltimore Black Sox (1922)

Maurice Busby (March 31, 1892 – November 3, 1945) was an American professional baseball pitcher in the Negro leagues. He played with the Bacharach Giants, All Cubans, and Baltimore Black Sox in 1921 and 1922. His brother Jim Busby played with the Indianapolis ABCs/Detroit Stars in 1933.
