= Johnny Juran =

American baseball player (1900–1972)

- Pitcher
- Born: May 8, 1900; Pratt City, Alabama, U.S.
- Died: December 22, 1972 (aged 72); Birmingham, Alabama, U.S.
- Batted: Right Threw: Right

Negro league baseball debut
- 1923, for the Birmingham Black Barons

Last appearance
- 1924, for the Birmingham Black Barons

Teams
- Birmingham Black Barons (1923–1924)

John Henry Juran (May 8, 1900 – December 22, 1972) was an American Negro league baseball pitcher in the 1920s.

A native of Pratt City, Alabama, Juran was the brother of fellow Negro leaguer Eli Juran. Older brother Johnny played for the Birmingham Black Barons in 1923 and 1924. He died in Birmingham, Alabama in 1972 at age 72.
