= O'Neal Pullen =

American baseball player (1892-1944)

- Catcher
- Born: September 8, 1892; Beaumont, Texas, U.S.
- Died: April 19, 1944 (aged 51); Los Angeles, California, U.S.
- Batted: Right Threw: Right

Negro league baseball debut
- 1920, for the Brooklyn Royal Giants

Last appearance
- 1924, for the Baltimore Black Sox

Teams
- Brooklyn Royal Giants (1920); Baltimore Black Sox (1924)

O'Neal Pullen (September 8, 1892 – April 19, 1944) was an American Negro league catcher for the Brooklyn Royal Giants and Baltimore Black Sox in the early 1920s.

A native of Beaumont, Texas, Pullen served in the US Army in France in the 509th Colored Engineers battalion during World War I. He began his Negro leagues career in 1920 with the Brooklyn Royal Giants, and later played for the Baltimore Black Sox. Pullen spent the majority of his professional baseball career in the integrated California Winter League, and also was one of the first American baseball professionals to tour Japan.

Pullen died in Los Angeles, California in 1944 at age 51.
