= Strategic Seduction =

- First edition
- Author: Cheris Hodges
- Language: English
- Publication date: 2018

Strategic Seduction is a romance novel by Cheris Hodges, published in 2018 by Dafina Books.

The book received a generally positive reception, receiving reviews from publications including Kirkus Reviews, Publishers Weekly, and Bookish.
