= William Evans (baseball) =

- Pitcher
- Batted: Unknown Threw: Unknown

Negro league baseball debut
- 1924, for the Lincoln Giants

Last appearance
- 1925, for the Baltimore Black Sox
- Stats at Baseball Reference

Teams
- Lincoln Giants (1924); Baltimore Black Sox (1925)

William Evans was an American professional baseball pitcher in the Negro leagues. He played with the Lincoln Giants in 1924 and the Baltimore Black Sox in 1925.
