= Harry Williams (third baseman) =

American baseball player (fl. 1920s)

- Third baseman

Negro league baseball debut
- 1920, for the Baltimore Black Sox

Last appearance
- 1921, for the Baltimore Black Sox

Teams
- Baltimore Black Sox (1920–1921)

Harry Williams was an American Negro league third baseman in the 1920s.

Williams played for the Baltimore Black Sox in 1920 and 1921. In four recorded career games, he posted three hits in 15 plate appearances.
