= Talmadge Richardson =

- Pitcher
- Batted: Unknown Threw: Unknown

Negro league baseball debut
- 1921, for the Bacharach Giants

Last appearance
- 1923, for the Baltimore Black Sox

Teams
- Bacharach Giants (1921); Richmond Giants (1922); Baltimore Black Sox (1922-1923)

Talmadge Richardson was an American professional baseball pitcher in the Negro leagues. He played with Bacharach Giants in 1921, the Richmond Giants in 1922, and the Baltimore Black Sox in 1923.
