= Frank Blake (baseball) =

American baseball player

- Pitcher
- Born: September 22, 1910; Boston, Massachusetts, U.S.
- Died: Unknown; Unknown
- Batted: Unknown Threw: Left

Negro league baseball debut
- 1932, for the Baltimore Black Sox

Last appearance
- 1935, for the New York Cubans
- Stats at Baseball Reference

Teams
- Baltimore Black Sox (1932); New York Black Yankees (1934); New York Cubans (1935)

Francis "Powerhouse" Blake (September 22, 1910 – date of death unknown) was an American professional baseball pitcher in the Negro leagues. He played with the Baltimore Black Sox in 1932, the New York Black Yankees in 1934, and the New York Cubans in 1935.
