= Tom Payne (baseball) =

- Left fielder
- Batted: Unknown Threw: Unknown

Negro league baseball debut
- 1933, for the Homestead Grays

Last appearance
- 1933, for the Baltimore Black Sox

Teams
- Homestead Grays (1933); Baltimore Black Sox (1933)

Thomas Payne was an American professional baseball left fielder in the Negro leagues. He played with Homestead Grays and Baltimore Black Sox in 1933.
