= Nick Logan (baseball) =

American baseball player

- Pitcher
- Born: July 18, 1896; Buckingham County, Virginia, U.S.
- Died: April 1975; Wayne, Pennsylvania, U.S.

Negro league baseball debut
- 1921, for the Baltimore Black Sox

Last appearance
- 1923, for the Baltimore Black Sox

Teams
- Baltimore Black Sox (1921–1923)

Nicholas Logan (July 18, 1896 – April 1975) was an American Negro league pitcher in the 1920s.

A native of Buckingham County, Virginia, Logan made his Negro leagues debut in 1921 for the Baltimore Black Sox, and played three seasons with Baltimore. He died in Wayne, Pennsylvania in 1975 at age 78.
