= Deadly Rumors =

Romance novel by Cheris F. Hodges

- First edition (publ. Dafina Books)
- Author: Cheris F. Hodges
- Language: English
- Publication date: 2017

Deadly Rumors is a romance novel by Cheris F. Hodges, published in 2017 by Kensington Books.

The book received a generally positive reception, receiving reviews from publications including The New York Times, Publishers Weekly, and Kirkus Reviews.
