= Anthony Mahoney =

American baseball player (1893-1924)

- Pitcher / Manager
- Born: September 12, 1893; Charles County, Maryland, U.S.
- Died: September 25, 1924 (aged 31); Washington, DC, U.S.
- Batted: Right Threw: Left

Negro league baseball debut
- 1921, for the Brooklyn Royal Giants

Last appearance
- 1923, for the Baltimore Black Sox
- Managerial record at Baseball Reference

Teams
- As player: Brooklyn Royal Giants (1921); Indianapolis ABCs (1921–1922); Baltimore Black Sox (1923); As manager: Baltimore Black Sox (1923)

Anthony Barnes Mahoney (September 12, 1893 – September 25, 1924) was an American Negro league pitcher and manager in the 1920s.

A native of Charles County, Maryland, Mahoney served in the United States Armed Forces during World War I. He made his Negro leagues debut in 1921 with the Brooklyn Royal Giants and Indianapolis ABCs. He played for Indianapolis again the following season, then finished his career in 1923 as a player-manager with the Baltimore Black Sox. Mahoney died in Washington, D.C., in 1924 at age 31.
