= Louis North =

American baseball player

Negro league baseball debut
- 1922, for the Richmond Giants

Last appearance
- 1922, for the Baltimore Black Sox

Teams
- Richmond Giants (1922); Baltimore Black Sox (1922)

Louis North was an American Negro league outfielder in the 1920s.

North played for the Richmond Giants and Baltimore Black Sox in 1922. In 25 recorded games, he posted 19 hits and nine RBI in 93 plate appearances.
