= Joe Wheeler (baseball) =

- Pitcher
- Born: 1898; Unknown
- Batted: Right Threw: Right

Negro league baseball debut
- 1921, for the Baltimore Black Sox

Last appearance
- 1925, for the Washington Potomacs

Teams
- Baltimore Black Sox (1921, 1923); Bacharach Giants (1922); Wilmington Potomacs (1925)

Joseph "Jodie" Wheeler (1898 - death date unknown) was an American professional baseball pitcher in the Negro leagues. He played with the Baltimore Black Sox in 1921 and 1923, the Bacharach Giants in 1922, and the Wilmington Potomacs in 1925. He was released by the Potomacs in June 1925.
