= Atkins Collins =

American baseball player

- Pitcher
- Born: June 14, 1909; Piper, Alabama, U.S.
- Died: May 24, 1947 (aged 37); Mount Vernon, Alabama, U.S.
- Batted: Unknown Threw: Unknown

EWL debut
- 1932, for the Baltimore Black Sox

Last EWL appearance
- 1932, for the Baltimore Black Sox

EWL statistics
- Win–loss record: 0–1
- Earned run average: 54.00
- Strikeouts: 0
- Stats at Baseball Reference

Teams
- Baltimore Black Sox (1932)

Burton Atkins Collins (June 14, 1909 – May 24, 1947) was an American baseball pitcher in the Negro leagues. He played with the Baltimore Black Sox in 1932. He attended Alabama State Teachers College and played college baseball for the Alabama State Hornets. By 1939, he was working as a schoolteacher. He was represented by Arthur Shores in a lawsuit in June 1939 in which he claimed to have been denied the right to vote in a local election because of his race.
