= Phil Williams (baseball) =

American baseball player

- Third baseman / Center fielder
- Batted: Left Threw: Right

Negro league baseball debut
- 1931, for the Baltimore Black Sox

Last appearance
- 1932, for the Baltimore Black Sox

Teams
- Baltimore Black Sox (1931-1932)

Philip Williams, also listed as Pete Williams, was an American professional baseball third baseman and center fielder in the Negro leagues. He played with the Baltimore Black Sox in 1931 and 1932.
