= Duke Lattimore =

American baseball player (1904-1986)

- Catcher
- Born: March 26, 1904; Emanuel County, Georgia, U.S.
- Died: February 22, 1986 (aged 81); Virginia Beach, Virginia, U.S.
- Batted: Unknown Threw: Unknown

Negro league baseball debut
- 1929, for the Baltimore Black Sox

Last appearance
- 1933, for the Columbus Blue Birds

Teams
- Baltimore Black Sox (1929); Columbus Blue Birds (1933)

Albert "Duke" Lattimore (March 26, 1904 – February 22, 1986), also listed as Alphonso Lattimore, was an American professional baseball catcher in the Negro leagues. He played with Baltimore Black Sox in 1929 and the Columbus Blue Birds in 1933.
