= Herb Smith =

- Pitcher
- Born: July 12, 1906; Savannah, Georgia, U.S.
- Batted: Unknown Threw: Unknown

Negro league baseball debut
- 1929, for the Baltimore Black Sox

Last appearance
- 1933, for the Philadelphia Stars

Teams
- Baltimore Black Sox (1929, 1932); Philadelphia Stars (1933)

Herbert Smith (July 12, 1906 - death date unknown) was an American professional baseball pitcher in the Negro leagues. He played with the Baltimore Black Sox in 1929 and 1932 and the Philadelphia Stars in 1933.

According to available records, Smith appeared in at least 19 recorded Negro leagues games as a pitcher. His career statistics include appearances with multiple teams over a span of several seasons.
