= George Boggs =

American baseball player

- Pitcher
- Born: 1899; Virginia, US
- Batted: Right Threw: Right

Negro league baseball debut
- 1921, for the Cleveland Tate Stars

Last appearance
- 1928, for the Baltimore Black Sox
- Stats at Baseball Reference

Teams
- Cleveland Tate Stars (1921); Milwaukee Bears (1923); Detroit Stars (1923); Dayton Marcos (1926); Cleveland Tigers (1928); Baltimore Black Sox (1928)

George Boggs Jr. (1899 – death unknown) was an American Negro league pitcher.

A native of Virginia, Boggs made his Negro leagues debut in 1921 with the Cleveland Tate Stars. He went on to play for several teams, finishing his career in 1928 with the Cleveland Tigers and Baltimore Black Sox.
