= Half Pint Allen =

- Pitcher
- Born: January 31, 1906; Bridgewater, Virginia, U.S.
- Died: January 24, 1995 (aged 88); Chester, Pennsylvania, U.S.
- Batted: Unknown Threw: Left

Negro league baseball debut
- 1932, for the Baltimore Black Sox

Last appearance
- 1934, for the Baltimore Black Sox

Teams
- Baltimore Black Sox (1932, 1934)

Melvin Edward "Half Pint" "Lefty" Allen (January 31, 1906 - January 24, 1995) was an American professional baseball pitcher in the Negro leagues. He played with the Baltimore Black Sox in 1932 and 1934.
