= Bob Clarke (baseball) =

Black American baseball player (1903–1971)

- Catcher / Player-manager
- Born: January 8, 1903; Richmond, Virginia, U.S.
- Died: January 1, 1971 (aged 67); Newark, New Jersey, U.S.
- Batted: Right Threw: Right

Negro league baseball debut
- 1922, for the Richmond Giants

Last appearance
- 1948, for the New York Black Yankees

Eastern Colored League, East–West League, American Negro League, & Negro National League II statistics
- Batting average: .215
- Home runs: 7
- Runs batted in: 156
- Managerial record: 45–48–3
- Managerial winning percentage: .484
- Stats at Baseball Reference
- Managerial record at Baseball Reference

Teams
- As player: Richmond Giants (1922); Baltimore Black Sox (1923, 1925–1932); New York Black Yankees (1933–1940); Baltimore Elite Giants (1941–1946); New York Black Yankees (1948); As player-manager: New York Black Yankees (1936–1937)

Career highlights and awards
- Negro league All-Star (1940)

Robert Alfred Clarke (January 8, 1903 – January 1971), nicknamed "Eggie", was an American professional catcher and player-manager in the Negro leagues from the 1920s through the 1940s.

A native of Richmond, Virginia, Clarke made his Negro leagues debut in 1922 with the Richmond Giants. In 1923, he joined the Baltimore Black Sox, and played for the club through 1932. From 1933 to 1940, Clarke played for the New York Black Yankees, serving as player-manager in 1936 and 1937, and being selected to the East–West All-Star Game in 1940. He spent 1941 through 1946 with the Baltimore Elite Giants, and finished his career with a short return stint with the Black Yankees in 1948. Clarke died in Newark, New Jersey in 1971 at age 67.
