= Dennis Simpson (baseball) =

American baseball player

- First baseman
- Born: August 12, 1904; Hallidayboro, Illinois, U.S.
- Died: October 24, 1977 (aged 73); Washington, D.C., U.S.
- Batted: Right Threw: Right

Negro league baseball debut
- 1933, for the Baltimore Sox

Last appearance
- 1933, for the Baltimore Sox

Teams
- Baltimore Sox (1933)

Dennis Simpson (August 12, 1904 – October 24, 1977) was an American professional baseball first baseman in the Negro leagues. He played with the Baltimore Sox in 1933. He is also listed simply as Simpson.
