= Louis Miller (baseball) =

- Third baseman / Manager
- Batted: Unknown Threw: Right

debut
- 1910, for the Brooklyn Royal Giants

Last appearance
- 1923, for the Baltimore Black Sox

Teams
- Brooklyn Royal Giants (1910, 1916–1917, 1920–1921); Paterson Smart Set (1912); Cuban Giants of Buffalo (1913); Philadelphia Giants (1913–1915)); New York Colored Giants (1914); Cuban Giants (1914); New York Lincoln Stars (1915–1916); Atlantic City Bacharach Giants (1917–1921); Baltimore Black Sox (1922–1923)

Louis "Red" Miller (birthdate unknown) was a Negro leagues third baseman and manager for several years before the founding of the first Negro National League, and in its first few seasons.

Miller managed the Baltimore Black Sox in 1922 and 1923.
