= Dewey Rivers =

American baseball player

- Left fielder
- Born: December 15, 1898; Clinton, South Carolina, U.S.
- Died: August 1970; Philadelphia, Pennsylvania, U.S.
- Batted: Unknown Threw: Unknown

Negro league baseball debut
- 1926, for the Hilldale Club

Last appearance
- 1933, for the Baltimore Black Sox

Teams
- Hilldale Club (1926); Baltimore Black Sox (1933)

Dewey "Deep" Rivers (December 15, 1898 – August 1970) was an American professional baseball left fielder in the Negro leagues. He played with the Hilldale Club in 1926 and the Baltimore Black Sox in 1933.
