= Henry Blackmon =

American baseball player

- Third baseman
- Born: September 16, 1891; Hillsboro, Texas, U.S.
- Died: August 8, 1924 (aged 32); Baltimore, Maryland, U.S.
- Batted: Right Threw: Right

Negro league baseball debut
- 1920, for the Indianapolis ABCs

Last appearance
- 1924, for the Baltimore Black Sox
- Stats at Baseball Reference

Teams
- Indianapolis ABCs (1920–1924); Baltimore Black Sox (1924)

Henry Blackmon (September 16, 1891 – August 8, 1924) was an American Negro league third baseman in the 1920s.

A native of Hillsboro, Texas, Blackmon played for the Indianapolis ABCs from 1920 to 1924, and for the Baltimore Black Sox in 1924. Blackmon played third base and was stated to be a dependable .300 hitter, earning a salary of $180 per month. Blackmon died in Baltimore, Maryland in 1924 at age 32.
