= Bob Wells (American football) =

American football player (1945–1994)

No. 77
- Position: Offensive tackle

Personal information
- Born: August 4, 1945; New York, New York, U.S.
- Died: August 7, 1994 (aged 49); Decatur, Georgia, U.S.
- Listed height: 6 ft 4 in (1.93 m)
- Listed weight: 280 lb (127 kg)

Career information
- High school: Lucy Craft Laney (GA)
- College: Johnson C. Smith (1967)
- NFL draft: 1968: 15th round, 403rd overall pick

Career history
- San Diego Chargers (1968-1970); Cincinnati Bengals (1971)*; Houston Texans-Shreveport Steamer (1974)
- * Offseason or practice squad member only

Career NFL/AFL statistics
- Games played: 20
- Games started: 2
- Stats at Pro Football Reference

Robert Leroy Wells Jr. (August 4, 1945 – August 7, 1994) was an American professional football offensive tackle. He played college football for Johnson C. Smith and professional football for the San Diego Chargers (1968–1970), Cincinnati Bengals (1971), and Houston Texans (1974).

== Early life ==
Wells was born in New York City in 1945 and attended Lucy Craft Laney High School in Augusta, Georgia.

== College football ==
Wells played college football at Johnson C. Smith University in Charlotte, North Carolina.

== Professional football ==
Wells was selected by the San Diego Chargers in the 15th round of the 1968 NFL/AFL draft. He played at the right offensive tackle position for the Chargers, appearing in 20 games from 1968 to 1970. He also played for the Cincinnati Bengals in 1971 and for the Houston Texans of the World Football League in 1974.

== Later life ==
Wells died in 1994 at age 49 in Decatur, Georgia.
