= William Craddock (baseball) =

- Right fielder
- Batted: Unknown Threw: Unknown

Negro league baseball debut
- 1929, for the Baltimore Black Sox

Last appearance
- 1929, for the Bacharach Giants
- Stats at Baseball Reference

Teams
- Baltimore Black Sox (1929); Bacharach Giants (1929)

William Craddock was an American professional baseball right fielder in the Negro leagues. He played with the Baltimore Black Sox and Bacharach Giants in 1929.
