= Crush Holloway =

American baseball player

- Outfielder
- Born: September 15, 1896; Hillsboro, Texas, U.S.
- Died: June 24, 1972 (aged 75); Baltimore, Maryland, U.S.
- Batted: Switch Threw: Right

Negro leagues debut
- 1921, for the Indianapolis ABCs

Last Negro leagues appearance
- 1939, for the Baltimore Elite Giants
- Stats at Baseball Reference

Teams
- Indianapolis ABCs (1921–1923); Baltimore Black Sox (1924–1928, 1931–1933); Hilldale Daisies (1929, 1932); Detroit Stars (1930); New York Black Yankees (1932); Atlantic City Bacharach Giants (1934); Brooklyn Eagles (1935); Baltimore Elite Giants (1939)

Crush Christopher Columbus Holloway (September 15, 1896 – June 24, 1972) was an American professional outfielder who played in the Negro leagues between 1921 and 1939. A terror on the basepaths, Holloway earned a reputation as one of the most aggressive base runners in the league, often sharpening his spikes to intimidate opposing players. He joined various teams during his career, including the Indianapolis ABCs and the Baltimore Black Sox.

== Life and career ==
Holloway was born in Hillsboro, Texas, and raised in Waco. His actual first name "Crush", often wrongly associated with his physical presence on the basepaths, was given to him by his father the same day he witnessed two locomotives collide with each other at a county fair. As the only son of six siblings, Holloway was depended upon to work on the family cotton farm as a child, but also found time to play sandlot ball, emulating the play, particularly the baserunning style, of his idol Ty Cobb.

In 1919, Holloway signed his first professional baseball contract with the Waco Black Navigators, a club belonging to the Texas Colored League, playing primarily as a second baseman. After just three months however, the team suffered severe financial losses and was moved to San Antonio where they played as the renamed Black Aces for two seasons. A blockbuster seven-player trade sent Holloway to the Indianapolis ABCs in 1921. Because the second base position was already locked down by Connie Day, Holloway was converted into an outfielder by manager C. I. Taylor, who also mentored him on base stealing.

Thanks to Taylor and his observations of Cobb, Holloway became an intimidating presence on the base paths. As base stealing aficionado Jake Stephens described him: "By God! You'd be committing hara-kiri to get in the way of Crush Holloway or Jimmie Lyons. They'd cut you to death. I mean, they'd sharpen their spikes before they went out on the ball field. Like Cobb". To take advantage of his exceptional speed, the switch-hitting Holloway perfected the drag bunt to outrun the infield and get on base for those batting behind him. During his time spent with the ABCs between 1921 and 1923, he consistently retained a batting average (BA) around .300.

In 1924, Holloway joined the Baltimore Black Sox, signing a highly lucrative $350–375 per month contract. Again, he batted around .300 during his stint with the Black Sox, finishing with .331, .289, and .284 BAs respectively in three seasons with the club. The Hilldale Daisies acquired Holloway's contract in an exchange involving Red Ryan and Frank Warfield in 1929; the same season, Holloway lead the league in steals. Toward the latter half of his career, he hopped into several different teams, including the Detroit Stars, Black Sox, New York Black Yankees, Atlantic City Bacharach Giants, Brooklyn Eagles, and his final club the Baltimore Elite Giants before retiring in 1939.

Baseball historian John B. Holway later found Holloway in 1969, living in an impoverished district in Baltimore, Maryland where he owned a small tailor shop. Holloway died in June 1972 from cancer; he was 75.
