= Bill Dusenbery =

American football player (born 1948)

No. 47
- Position: Running back

Personal information
- Born: September 15, 1948 (age 78); Washington, D.C., U.S.
- Listed height: 6 ft 2 in (1.88 m)
- Listed weight: 198 lb (90 kg)

Career information
- High school: Dunbar (Lexington, Kentucky)
- College: Johnson C. Smith (1966–1969)
- NFL draft: 1970: 2nd round, 40th overall pick

Career history
- Houston Oilers (1970)*; New Orleans Saints (1970); Houston Oilers (1973)*
- * Offseason or practice squad member only

Career NFL statistics
- Rushing yards: 6
- Rushing average: 1.5
- Return yards: 183
- Stats at Pro Football Reference

William Dusenbery (born September 15, 1948) is an American former professional football player who was a running back for one season with the New Orleans Saints of the National Football League (NFL). He was selected by the Houston Oilers in the second round of the 1970 NFL draft. He played college football at Johnson C. Smith University.

== Early life ==
William Dusenbery was born on September 15, 1948, in Washington, D.C. and attended Paul Laurence Dunbar High School in Lexington, Kentucky. He helped Dunbar win the state title and also played in the 1966 Shrine Bowl.

== College career ==
Dusenbery played college football for the Johnson C. Smith Golden Bulls of Johnson C. Smith University, where he was the starting running back from 1966 to 1969. He earned all-conference honors his senior year in 1969. He rushed 447 times for 2,543 yards and 23 touchdowns during his college career. He was inducted into the Johnson C. Smith University Athletics Hall of Fame in 1997 and the CIAA Hall of Fame in 2024.

== Professional career ==
Dusenbery was selected by the Houston Oilers in the second round, with the 40th overall pick, of the 1970 NFL draft. He signed with the Oilers in 1970. He was traded to the Saints later in 1970. He played in eight games for the Saints during the 1970 season, rushing four times for six yards and returning ten kicks for 183 yards. He was released by the Saints in 1971.

Dusenbary signed with the Oilers again in 1973, but was released later that year.

== Personal life ==
Following his football career, Dusenbery worked for the Los Angeles Parks and Recreation Department for 35 yards, including a stint as Senior Director.
