= Cheris Hodges =

American journalist

- Born: 1977 (age 48–49)
- Education: Johnson C. Smith University
- Occupations: Author; freelance journalist
- Writing career
- Genre: Romance

Cheris F. Hodges (born 1977) is an African-American author of romance novels and a freelance journalist.

Hodges graduated from Johnson C. Smith University in 1999 with a degree in journalism. She lives in Charlotte, North Carolina. Hodges has previously written for Creative Loafing Charlotte and is also a winner of the North Carolina Press Association's community journalism award.

== Awards ==
- North Carolina Press Association's community journalism award

== Selected novels ==
- Betting on Love (2009)
- More Than He Can Handle (2009)
- His Sexy Bad Habit (2011)
- Too Hot for TV (2011)
- Recipe for Desire (2012)
- Forces of Nature (2013)
- Love After War (2013)
- Rumor Has It (2015)
- I Heard a Rumor (2015)
- Deadly Rumors (2017)
- The Perfect Present (2017)
- Strategic Seduction (2018)
