= Vanderbilt Brown =

American physician (1886 – 1921)

- Born: May 25, 1886; Danville, Virginia
- Died: April 25, 1921 (aged 34); Kanawha County, West Virginia
- Resting place: Danville, Virginia
- Education: Biddle University; Boston College of Physicians and Surgeons (1912)
- Occupation: physician
- Employer: Tuskegee Institute Hospital
- Title: First Lieutenant
- Parent(s): Thomas Brown; Maria Jones

Vanderbilt Brown (May 25, 1886 – April 25, 1921) was an American physician in Virginia. He was one of the first physicians to finish training in World War I (as a part of the Medical Reserve Corps). He was assigned to 365th Ambulance Company in the 317th Infantry of the 92nd Division. Brown died a few years after the war.

== Early life ==
Vanderbilt Brown was born in Danville, Virginia to Thomas Brown and Maria Jones. There is not much record of his early life, other than he attended Biddle University in Charlotte before going to attend Boston College of Physicians and Surgeons. Brown graduated from medical school in 1912 and began interning in Tuskegee Institute Hospital, which was part of the school Booker T. Washington had started. He returned to Charlotte, North Carolina in 1917 to start his own medical practice.

== Military service ==
In 1917, the United States joined World War I. After the declaration of war with Germany, many African Americans were turned away from the local recruiting stations. Unprepared for a large scale conflict, the United States Army had only four black regiments, and many commanders would not allow mixing of blacks and whites in their units. Also, the black regiments themselves were not trusted to be sent to Europe, as many of the higher ups possessed a lack of confidence in black soldiers as fighters. Fort Des Moines Provisional Army Officer Training School had been opened for training African American men as there had been a huge influx of African American volunteers and a petition was erected by the students of Howard University. However, there was still some discontent at the facility as many soldiers found that he had been unfairly assessed for merely being black.

When Dr. V. Brown answered the military's call for physicians he was immediately given the rank, First Lieutenant in the Army Medical Reserve Corps. Like all the African American recruits, he was sent to Fort Des Moines for medical training at the Medical Officers Training Camp. Indeed, he was one of the first individuals who entered the training camp and volunteered for duty. After completing his training, he was assigned to the 356th Field Hospital in the 92nd Division's 317th Regiment.

When arriving at France, Lieutenant Bradfield was reassigned to work in the 365th Ambulance Company where he remained throughout the war. During World War I, Ambulance companies were responsible for conducted first aid stations to treat immediate wounds and find best manners in evacuating injured soldiers. When the United States entered the World War I effort, the army organized ambulance units to serve at the front with the French. The War Department Orders NO. 75 established the U.S. Army Ambulance Service (USAAS) and the Sanitary Corps followed a week later. Both were part of the evolution of the Medical Reserve Corps. This allowed the Medical Department to commission individuals in specialties if need be. Lt. Brown also would have had his hands full with treating ill and influenza stricken soldiers as life in the trenches was hard.

Upon the 92nd Division's entry into French soil, it was moved to the St. Dre Sector to relief the 5th Regular U.S. Army Division (composed of white soldiers). Only a few days later had the 5th Regular Division captured the village of Frapelle. Immediately, these fresh African American recruits were submerged into the harsh terrain of the trenches where the Germans had been sending aggressive assaults, such as frequent released of gassing shells to Allied troops. In mid September Frapelle face a heavy German bombardment as an airplane duel came into the mixture. With aerial and artillery fire coming from many sides, Lieutenant Brown was on full deck. At some point during the attack, the Germans learned that the opposing force that faced them, the 92nd Division, was composed entirely of African Americans. The Germans decided to change tactics and went into the trenches. The U.S. troops believed that the Germans were sending another surge of gassing shells, however, when nothing emitted from the shells they went to investigate. Within the shells was a printed propaganda written in English. It was titled "To the Colored Soldiers of the American Army". The text continued saying:

           "Hello, boys, what are you doing over here? Fighting the Germans? Why? Have they ever done you any harm? Of course some white folks and the lying English-American papers told you that the Germans ought to be wiped out for the sake of Humanity and Democracy.What is Democracy? Personal freedom, all citizens enjoying the same rights socially and before the law. Do you enjoy the same rights as the white people do in America, the land of Freedom and Democracy, or are you rather not treated over there as second-class citizens? Can you go into a restaurant where white people dine? Can you get a seat in the theater where white people sit? Can you get a seat or a berth in the railroad car, or can you even ride, in the South, in the same street car with white people? And how about the law? Is lynching and the most horrible crimes connected therewith a lawful proceeding in a democratic country? Now, this is all different in Germany, where they do like colored people, where they treat them as gentlemen and as white people, and quite a number of colored people have fine positions in business in Berlin and other German cities. Why, then, fight the Germans only for the benefit of the Wall street robbers and to protect the millions they have loaned to the British, French, and Italians? You have been made the tool of the egotistic and rapacious rich in England and in America, and there is nothing in the whole game for you but broken bones, horrible wounds, spoiled health, or death. No satisfaction whatever will you get out of this unjust war. You have never seen Germany. So you are fools if you allow people to make you hate us. Come over and see for yourself. Let those do the fighting who make the profit out of this war. Don't allow them to use you as cannon fodder. To carry a gun in this war is not an honor, but a shame. Throw it away and come over into the German lines. You will find friends who will help you along".[5]

Lieutenant Brown and his fellow soldiers did not fall for the bait and continued fighting to their "honor and credit", according to E.J. Scott. The fighting continued with more aerial fire coming from the Germans, however, the French anti-aircraft guns got rid of the assault and the division moved from St. Die Sector to Ste. Menehold. The 92nd Division became a reserve corps for the Mseu-Argonne campaign in October. In November, he and his unit faced another aggressive assault from the Germans in Metz.

At the war's conclusion, he returned to Camp Lee in Virginia to treat remaining injured soldiers. He was honorably discharged in May 1919.

== Career ==
Dr. Brown moved back to Charleston, West Virginia to continue work on a medical practice.

== Death ==
Dr. Brown did not survive long after the war. He was discovered at his home in 1921, dead from a gunshot wound. The circumstances surrounding the murder were and still to this day are unknown. His body was returned to Danville, Virginia to be buried. He was survived by his mother.
