= Gregory Clifton =

American football player (born 1968)

No. 31
- Position: Wide receiver

Personal information
- Born: February 6, 1968 (age 58); Charlotte, North Carolina, U.S.
- Listed height: 5 ft 11 in (1.80 m)
- Listed weight: 175 lb (79 kg)

Career information
- High school: Independence (Charlotte)
- College: Johnson C. Smith
- NFL draft: 1993: undrafted

Career history
- Washington Redskins (1993); Philadelphia Eagles (1994)*; Carolina Panthers (1995)*
- * Offseason or practice squad member only

Career NFL statistics
- Receptions: 2
- Receiving yards: 15
- Stats at Pro Football Reference

Gregory T. Clifton (born February 6, 1968) is an American former professional football player who was a wide receiver for the Washington Redskins of the National Football League (NFL) in 1993. He played college football for the Johnson C. Smith Golden Bulls and VMI Keydets before playing two games in the NFL for Washington in 1993. On October 5, 1994, he was one of the first six players to tryout for the Carolina Panthers, who had yet to play a game.
