= James Womack (baseball) =

- First baseman
- Batted: Right Threw: Right

Negro league baseball debut
- 1928, for the Cleveland Tigers (1928)

Last appearance
- 1933, for the Baltimore Black Sox

Teams
- Cleveland Tigers (1928); Indianapolis ABCs (1931); Pollock's Cuban Stars (1932); Baltimore Black Sox (1933)

James Womack was an American professional baseball first baseman in the Negro leagues. He played from 1928 to 1933 with several teams.
