= Tim Beamer =

American football player (born 1948)

No. 46
- Position: Defensive back

Personal information
- Born: April 6, 1948 (age 78); Galax, Virginia, U.S.
- Listed height: 5 ft 11 in (1.80 m)
- Listed weight: 190 lb (86 kg)

Career information
- High school: Galax (VA)
- College: Illinois; Johnson C. Smith
- NFL draft: 1971: 5th round, 113th overall pick

Career history
- Buffalo Bills (1971); Hamilton Tiger-Cats (1973); Winnipeg Blue Bombers (1973); Memphis Southmen (1974)
- Stats at Pro Football Reference

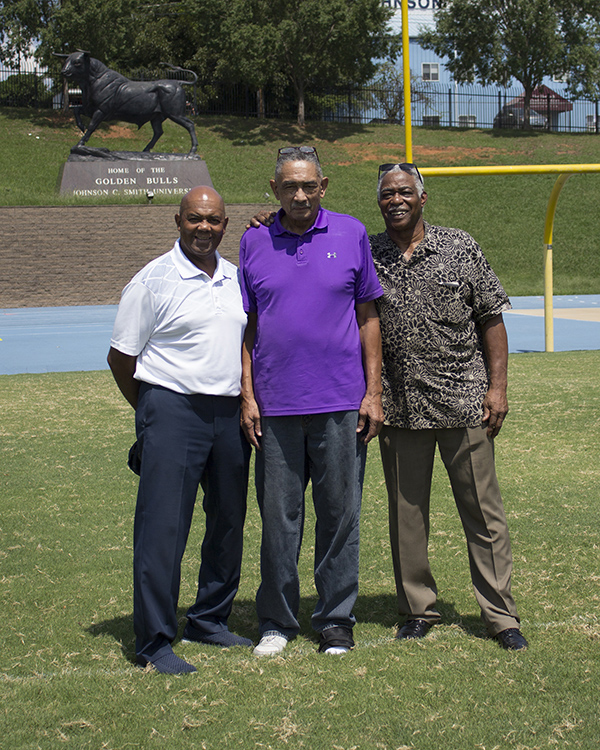
Tim Beamer (right) with two teammates from the 1969 CIAA national championship team, kicker Bernard Parker (left) and quarterback Elroy Duncan (center).

Timothy Carl Beamer (born April 6, 1948) is an American former professional football defensive back who played in the National Football League (NFL) for the Buffalo Bills for 12 games in 1971. In 1973, he played in the Canadian Football League (CFL) for the Hamilton Tiger-Cats and Winnipeg Blue Bombers. In 1974, he played for the Memphis Southmen in the World Football League (WFL), returning twenty kicks for a total of five hundred and seventy-three yards, averaging 28.7 yards a return, leading the league. Following the collapse of the WFL, Beamer earned a tryout with the New York Giants of the NFL. In New York, coaches tried Beamer at several positions, including running back. According to the New York Daily News:

"The most talked-about former WFLer in the Giants’ training camp these days is not necessarily Larry Csonka or any of the offensive linemen who came here with him. The Wiffle-man who has been getting the most frequent mention from coach Bill Arnsparger is Tim Beamer, a man without a position."

During a preseason game that year, Beamer suffered a shoulder injury that ended his professional career.

== Early life ==
Tim Beamer was the first Black athlete to play any sport at Galax High School in Galax, Virginia. He had never played organized football until his junior year, 1964, but he learned the game from Coach Joe Lindsey, led the New River District in scoring in both 1964 and 1965, and helped turn a previously winless football team into a contender. He also tied a state record the 100-yard dash (9.9 seconds) and set a new record for the 220-yard dash (21.9 seconds) at the Virginia state track meet in 1966. With his brothers, Donald and Joe, and his cousin, Richard Tyree, Tim set a state record in the 880-yard relay (1:32). At a track meet during his senior year, Tim Beamer set a district record of 9.7 seconds in the 100-yard dash, a record that stood for more than 20 years.

== College career ==
In 1966, Beamer accepted a football scholarship from the University of Illinois and played on the freshman team as a running back. The next spring, a sports reporter who sized up the varsity’s prospects speculated that Beamer, “a ‘sleeper’ from Galax, Va.,” had a shot at the job of starting halfback. The reporter had failed to notice that Beamer had been dismissed from school, along with more than a dozen other athletes, in the 1966-1967 "Slush Fund Scandal." The Big Ten Conference found that the athletes, most of them Black, accepted spending money from an off-the-books account managed by the university's athletic department. Beamer has stated that he and his teammates took small amounts of money because personnel in the athletic department assured them that this was proper. Murry Nelson, a sports historian, has concluded that 14 athletes were "collateral damage" who got "short shrift" in the scandal.

After leaving Illinois, Beamer enrolled at Johnson C. Smith University in Charlotte, N. C. He was not eligible to play football until his junior year, but he excelled on the track team and set a CIAA record with a time of 9.3 seconds in the 100-yard dash. Beamer played defensive back for the Golden Bulls' CIAA national championship team in 1969 and earned CIAA All American honors as a running back in 1970.

== Post-football career and personal life ==
With his older brother, Doug, Tim Beamer operated a pest-control business in Charlotte, N. C. for 30 years. With a former teammate at J. C. Smith, Bernard Parker, Beamer coached youth-league football in Charlotte for 17 years. In Charlotte, he and his brothers, Joe and Donald, have competed in golf tournaments.

== Honors ==
. Tim Beamer has been inducted into the Twin Counties Hall of Fame (Galax Gazette, Grayson and Carroll counties, Virginia) and the Johnson C. Smith University Hall of Fame. He was named to the New River District's all-district football team in both 1965 and 1966. He was a member of the Johnson C. Smith CIAA national championship team in 1969 and was named to the CIAA All American team as a running back in 1970.
