= Lewis Anderson (baseball) =

- Catcher
- Batted: Right Threw: Right

Negro league baseball debut
- 1930, for the Chicago American Giants

Last appearance
- 1933, for the Baltimore Black Sox
- Stats at Baseball Reference

Teams
- Chicago American Giants (1930); Baltimore Black Sox (1933)

Lewis Anderson was an American professional baseball catcher in the Negro leagues. He played with the Chicago American Giants in 1930 and the Baltimore Black Sox in 1933.
