= William Lindsay (baseball) =

American baseball player

- Shortstop
- Born: April 15, 1905; Spartanburg, South Carolina, U.S.
- Died: May 9, 2006 (aged 101); Philadelphia, Pennsylvania, U.S.
- Batted: Right Threw: Right

Negro league baseball debut
- 1934, for the Bacharach Giants

Last appearance
- 1934, for the Bacharach Giants

Teams
- Bacharach Giants (1934)

William Hudson Lindsay (April 15, 1905 – May 9, 2006), nicknamed "Red", was an American Negro league shortstop for the 1934 Bacharach Giants.

A native of Spartanburg, South Carolina, Lindsay graduated from Johnson C. Smith University, and is a member of the school's athletic hall of fame. Lindsay died in Philadelphia, Pennsylvania in 2007 at age 101.
