= Bun Hayes =

American baseball player (1903–1969)

- Pitcher
- Born: August 2, 1903; Louisburg, North Carolina, U.S.
- Died: November 29, 1969 (aged 66); Louisburg, North Carolina, U.S.
- Batted: Right Threw: Right

Negro league baseball debut
- 1928, for the Baltimore Black Sox

Last appearance
- 1935, for the Newark Dodgers
- Stats at Baseball Reference

Teams
- Baltimore Black Sox (1928–1930); Chicago American Giants (1930); Washington Pilots (1932); Baltimore Black Sox (1933–1934); Brooklyn Eagles (1935); Newark Dodgers (1935)

Burnalle James Hayes (August 2, 1903 – November 29, 1969), nicknamed "Bun", was an American Negro league pitcher from 1928 to 1935.

A native of Louisburg, North Carolina, Hayes attended Johnson C. Smith University and North Carolina Central University. He made his Negro leagues debut in 1928 with the Baltimore Black Sox. Hayes played for Baltimore through 1930, and returned to Baltimore for two more seasons in 1933 and 1934. He finished his career in 1935, splitting time between the Brooklyn Eagles and Newark Dodgers. Hayes died in Louisburg in 1969 at age 66.
