= Orval Tucker =

American baseball player

- Infielder
- Batted: Right Threw: Right

Negro league baseball debut
- 1930, for the Baltimore Black Sox

Last appearance
- 1930, for the Hilldale Club

Teams
- Baltimore Black Sox (1930); Hilldale Club (1930)

Orval Tucker is an American former Negro league infielder who played in the 1930s.

Tucker attended Johnson C. Smith University, and played in the Negro leagues in 1930 for the Baltimore Black Sox and the Hilldale Club. In his 15 recorded career games, he posted 12 hits with a home run and nine RBI in 49 plate appearances.
