= Mickey Casey =

American baseball player (1905-1968)

- Catcher
- Born: May 5, 1905; Newport News, Virginia, U.S.
- Died: January 1968; Philadelphia, Pennsylvania, U.S.
- Threw: Right

Negro league baseball debut
- 1930, for the Brooklyn Royal Giants

Last appearance
- 1942, for the Baltimore Elite Giants
- Stats at Baseball Reference

Teams
- Brooklyn Royal Giants (1930); Baltimore Black Sox (1930–1932); Philadelphia Stars (1933–1938); Washington Black Senators (1938); Newark Eagles (1938); Pittsburgh Crawfords (1938); New York Cubans (1939–1940); Baltimore Elite Giants (1942)

William Cofer Casey (May 5, 1905 – January 1968), nicknamed "Mickey", was an American Negro league catcher between 1930 and 1942.

A native of Newport News, Virginia, Casey attended Johnson C. Smith University. He made his Negro leagues debut in 1930 with the Brooklyn Royal Giants and Baltimore Black Sox. Casey went on to play for several teams, including a six-year stretch with the Philadelphia Stars. He finished his career in 1942 with the Baltimore Elite Giants. Casey died in Philadelphia, Pennsylvania in 1968 at the age of 62.
