= Draff Young =

American basketball coach

Personal information
- Born: April 9, 1942 Florence County, South Carolina, U.S.
- Died: March 24, 2012 (aged 69)

Career information
- High school: Eastern (Washington, D.C.)
- Coaching career: 1970–2006

Career history

Coaching
- 1970–1974: Cincinnati Royals / Kansas City–Omaha Kings (assistant)
- 1973: Kansas City–Omaha Kings (interim)
- 1974–1977: Oral Roberts (assistant)
- 1977–1978: USC (assistant)
- 1994–2006: Al Jahra

Draff Young (April 9, 1942 – March 24, 2012) was a National Basketball Association (NBA) coach.

Draff had a lifetime love and passion for basketball. His inspiration for basketball was stirred when his Uncle Perry put a peach barrel rim on the side of the house; this enabled him and his cousins to play basketball. Draff played basketball while attending Johnson C. Smith University, and after leaving college he began his career in professional basketball.

His career included an accomplishment of serving as Director of Public Relations and Promotions for Randolph Manufacturing Company, Randolph, Massachusetts (1965–1968). He appeared as a guest host on many television programs, in and outside the United States. He played with Marcus Haynes and the Fabulous Magicians during their Massachusetts appearances. He also played with Sam "Boom Boom" Wheeler and his All-Stars when they made their New England swing (1964–1968).

In 1967, Draff started a basketball program at the Boston School of the Deaf.

He served in the NBA from 1969 to 1974 as coach for the Cincinnati Royals and the Kansas City Omaha Kings.

In 1973, he became the first African-American who did not play in the NBA to serve as a head coach in the league when he coached for four games for the Kansas City-Omaha Kings. He also served as assistant coach on the USA Olympic basketball team that toured the United States in 1973.

From 1974 to 1977, he served as assistant basketball coach at Oral Roberts University.

From 1977 to 1978, he served as an assistant basketball coach at the University of Southern California.

Draff was Head National Men's Basketball coach for the country of Kuwait in 1978. He served as the Olympic Basketball coach for the country of Qatar from 1987 to 1994. From 1994 to 2006, he was Head basketball coach at Al Jahra Sports Club.

He was a basketball TV Sports Analyst for the NBA from 2003 to 2006.

After many years of traveling across the United States and various other countries pursuing his love of basketball, Draff returned to Timmonsville, South Carolina in pursuit of a spiritual journey. He began attending Zion Temple Holiness Church and was a dedicated member who could be seen many days praying in his parked car in the church's parking lot. He was appointed Deacon at Zion Temple and served faithfully until his health failed and he could no longer attend services.

== Head coaching record ==
=== NBA ===
Team	Year	G	W	L	W–L%	Finish	PG	PW	PL	PW–L%	Result
Kansas City–Omaha	1972–73	4	0	4	.000	interim	—	—	—	—	
Career		4	0	4	.000		—	—	—	—	
