= Tyrone Britt =

American basketball player

Personal information
- Born: April 18, 1944 (age 82)
- Listed height: 6 ft 4 in (1.93 m)
- Listed weight: 190 lb (86 kg)

Career information
- High school: Thomas Edison (Philadelphia, Pennsylvania)
- College: Johnson C. Smith
- NBA draft: 1967: undrafted
- Playing career: 1967–1968
- Position: Guard
- Number: 31

Career history
- 1967–1968: San Diego Rockets
- Stats at NBA.com
- Stats at Basketball Reference

Tyrone Britt (born April 18, 1944) is a retired American basketball player.

He played collegiately for the Johnson C. Smith University.

He played for the San Diego Rockets (1967–68) in the NBA for 11 games.

== Career statistics ==
Legend
| GP | Games played | GS | Games started | MPG | Minutes per game |
| FG% | Field goal percentage | 3P% | 3-point field goal percentage | FT% | Free throw percentage |
| RPG | Rebounds per game | APG | Assists per game | SPG | Steals per game |
| BPG | Blocks per game | PPG | Points per game | **Bold** | Career high |

=== NBA ===
==== Regular season ====
| Year | Team | GP | MPG | FG% | FT% | RPG | APG | PPG |
|---|---|---|---|---|---|---|---|---|
| 1967–68 | San Diego | 11 | 7.6 | .382 | .667 | 1.4 | 1.1 | 2.5 |
