= Philadelphia Tigers =

American professional baseball team

Information
- League: Eastern Colored League (1928)
- Location: Philadelphia, Pennsylvania
- Ballpark: Pencoyd Field
- Established: 1928
- Disbanded: 1928

The Philadelphia Tigers were a Negro league baseball team that played briefly in the 1928 Eastern Colored League (ECL) before the circuit disbanded in early June. The Tigers, organized by Smittie Lucas, featured a few well-known east coast players, such as Bill Yancey, George Johnson, and McKinley Downs, but no real stars.

They played at Pencoyd Field, which was near Wissahickon station in the Manayunk neighborhood of Philadelphia at 40°0′53″N 75°12′29″W.

After the ECL fell apart, the Tigers struggled on as a marginal independent team into July before disbanding.
