= Baltimore Black Sox =

Professional Negro league baseball team

Information
- League: Independent (1913–22, 30–31); Eastern Colored League (1923–28); American Negro League (1929); East-West League (1932); Negro National League (II) (1933-1934)
- Location: Baltimore, Maryland
- Ballpark: Maryland Baseball Park (1923–29); Bugle Field (1932–34)
- Established: 1913
- Disbanded: 1936
- League titles: 1929

The Baltimore Black Sox were a professional Negro league baseball team active between 1913 and 1936, based in Baltimore, Maryland.

== Founding ==
The Black Sox started as an independent team in 1913 by Howard Young. They were one of the original six teams to make up the Eastern Colored League in 1923.

== Heyday ==
In 1929, The Black Sox boasted the "Million Dollar Infield" of Jud "Boojum" Wilson (first baseman), Frank Warfield (second baseman), Oliver Marcell (third baseman) and Sir Richard Lundy (shortstop). The nickname was given to them by the media because of the prospective worth had they been white players. The Black Sox won over 70% of their games during the 1929 season and won the American Negro League Championship.

During their only season in the East–West League (1932), the Black Sox were in third place with a 41–41 record when the league ceased operations.

== Decline, demise and reincarnation ==
In 1932, Joe Cambria became co-owner and general manager and moved the team into Cum Posey's new East–West League. During that same year, the team moved its home games to Bugle Field, which was owned by Cambria. He renovated and expanded the field and added lighting equipment for night games. The team was in first place in the East–West League in late June when the league disbanded and the teams stopped paying player salaries, instead splitting a percentage of the gate receipts with the players. In 1933, the team joined Gus Greenlee's new Negro National League. The next season, Cambria applied to reenter the Negro National League, but when several star players announced they would leave the team, his application was rejected and he disbanded the team.

In mid-season 1934, another team entered the league using the Black Sox name, but it didn't meet with much success and disbanded after only one year. Another Black Sox team led by Crush Holloway joined the short lived minor Negro American Association in 1939.

== Players ==
=== Hall of Famers ===
- Leon Day
- Pete Hill
- Biz Mackey
- Satchel Paige
- Mule Suttles
- Ben Taylor
- Jud Wilson

== MLB throwback jersey ==
On September 6, 2007, the Baltimore Orioles wore Black Sox uniforms in commemoration of the 75th anniversary of the Black Sox' 1932 season.

On May 18, 2014, the Baltimore Orioles wore Black Sox uniforms as part of the Kansas City Royals's "Salute to the Negro Leagues".
