= Hilldale Club all-time roster =

The following is the list of players on the Hilldale Club all-time roster. These are Hilldale Club players who appeared in at least one game for the "Daisies" while they were based in Darby, Pennsylvania from 1916 to 1932.

On-going research continuously discovers unreported or misreported games (and the affected players), while some games and players may be lost forever. Therefore, some Negro league players' affiliations will likely remain incomplete and possibly disputed.

‡ Bold player inducted as a member of the National Baseball Hall of Fame and Museum.

== A–D ==
Player	Year(s)	Position(s)	Ref
Alex Albritton	1921	P	
Cliney Allen	1932	P	
Toussaint Allen	1919–1924	1B	
Paul Arnold	1926	OF	
Rudolph Ash	1926		
Jesse Barber	1920	2B	
William Baynard	1917	OF	
Otto Briggs	1917, 1919–1930	OF	
George Britt	1929	P / IF / C	
Country Brown	1918	OF	
Scrappy Brown	1920	SS	
Buddy Burbage	1930	OF	
Louis Burgee	1917, 1921	OF / 2B	
Ralph Burgin	1930	3B	
Bullet Campbell	1924–1928	P	
Walter Cannady	1928, 1931	1B / 2B	
George Carr	1923–1927, 1929	1B	
Cliff Carter	1929–1930, 1932	P	
Paul Carter	1931–1932	P	
John Cason	1920	2B	
Oscar Charleston‡	1928–1929	OF	
Porter Charleston	1927–1929, 1931–1932	P	
Phil Cockrell	1918–1932	P	
Darltie Cooper	1928–1929, 1932	P	
Charles Corbett	1927	P	
James Crump	1921–1922	2B	
Chance Cummings	1921	2B	
Rube Curry	1924–1925	P	
Eggie Dallard	1921, 1928–1932	1B / OF	
Yank Deas	1919	C	
Lou Dials	1932	OF	
Martín Dihigo‡	1929–1931	OF / IF / P	
Arthur Dilworth	1918	P / OF	
Tom Dixon	1930–1932	C	
Bunny Downs	1917–1922, 1929	IF	

== E–L ==
Player	Year(s)	Position(s)	Ref
Tom Fiall	1918	OF	
Willis Flournoy	1919–1923	P	
John Ford	1917	P	
Bill Francis	1920–1922	3B / SS	
William Fuller	1917–1918	2B	
Ping Gardner	1923, 1930	P	
Henry Gillespie	1921–1922, 1930	P	
Lewis Hampton	1923	P	
Andy Harris	1917, 1922	3B	
Willie Haynes	1922	P	
Charlie Henry	1922, 1926	P	
Bruce Hocker	1918	1B	
Crush Holloway	1929, 1932	OF	
Jesse Hubbard	1919, 1930	OF / P	
Robert Hudspeth	1929	1B	
Dick Jackson	1929–1930	2B	
Harry Jeffries	1932	3B	
Fats Jenkins	1928	OF	
Bill Johnson	1927	OF / C	
Cecil Johnson	1918	3B	
George Johnson	1918–1925, 1927	OF	
Jimmy Johnson	1932	SS	
Judy Johnson‡	1918, 1921–1929, 1931–1932	3B	
Shang Johnson	1917–1918	P	
Willie Jones	1930	C	
Eli Juran	1932	OF	
Harry Kenyon	1922	OF / P	
Ted Kimbro	1918	3B	
Obie Lackey	1929–1930, 1932	SS / 2B	
Obie Layton	1931	P	
Script Lee	1923–1927	P	
Oscar Levis	1930–1931	P	
Joe Lewis	1924–1925, 1927–1932	C	
Clarence Lindsay	1928	2B	
John Henry Lloyd‡	1923	SS	
Dick Lundy	1918–1919, 1923	SS	

== M–R ==
Player	Year(s)	Position(s)	Ref
Biz Mackey‡	1923–1931	C	
Oliver Marcell	1919	3B	
George Mayo	1917	1B	
Webster McDonald	1930–1931	P	
Chick Meade	1919	3B	
Bud Mitchell	1929–1931	OF / P	
John Perrigan	1921	2B	
Bill Pettus	1917–1918	1B	
Fred Pinder	1917	SS	
Spot Poles	1917, 1919	OF	
Wilbert Pritchett	1924, 1929–1930	P	
Connie Rector	1920–1922	P	
John Reese	1918–1919	OF	
Ambrose Reid	1930	3B / OF	
Cornelius Rhoades	1917	C	
John Richardson	1922	C	
Dewey Rivers	1926	OF	
Elihu Roberts	1919–1920	OF	
Newt Robinson	1925–1926	SS	
Red Ryan	1923–1929, 1930	P	

== S–Z ==
Player	Year(s)	Position(s)	Ref
Louis Santop‡	1918–1926	C	
Bob Scott	1927	OF	
Neck Stanley	1928–1929	P	
Otis Starks	1919	P	
Jake Stephens	1921–1929	SS	
Joe Strong	1928–1929	P	
Doc Sykes	1917–1918, 1922	P	
Melvin Sykes	1926	OF	
Clint Thomas	1923–1928	PF	
Herb Thomas	1930	P	
Clarence Thorpe	1928	P	
Norman Triplett	1917	OF	
Orval Tucker	1930	2B	
Pop Turner	1927	1B	
Jay Valentine	1917	OF	
Frank Warfield	1923–1928	2B	
Sam Warmack	1929, 1932	OF	
Namon Washington	1925–1927	OF	
Ted Waters	1927	OF	
Pearl Webster	1918	OF	
Burlin White	1919	C	
Chaney White	1920–1922, 1928–1932	OF	
Dick Whitworth	1920–1921	P	
Tom Williams	1918–1919	P	
Nip Winters	1923–1927, 1931	P	
Bill Yancey	1927, 1931	SS	
Jim York	1920–1921	C	
