= Mount Auburn Cemetery (Baltimore) =

Historic African American cemetery

- U.S. National Register of Historic Places
- U.S. Historic district
- Baltimore City Landmark
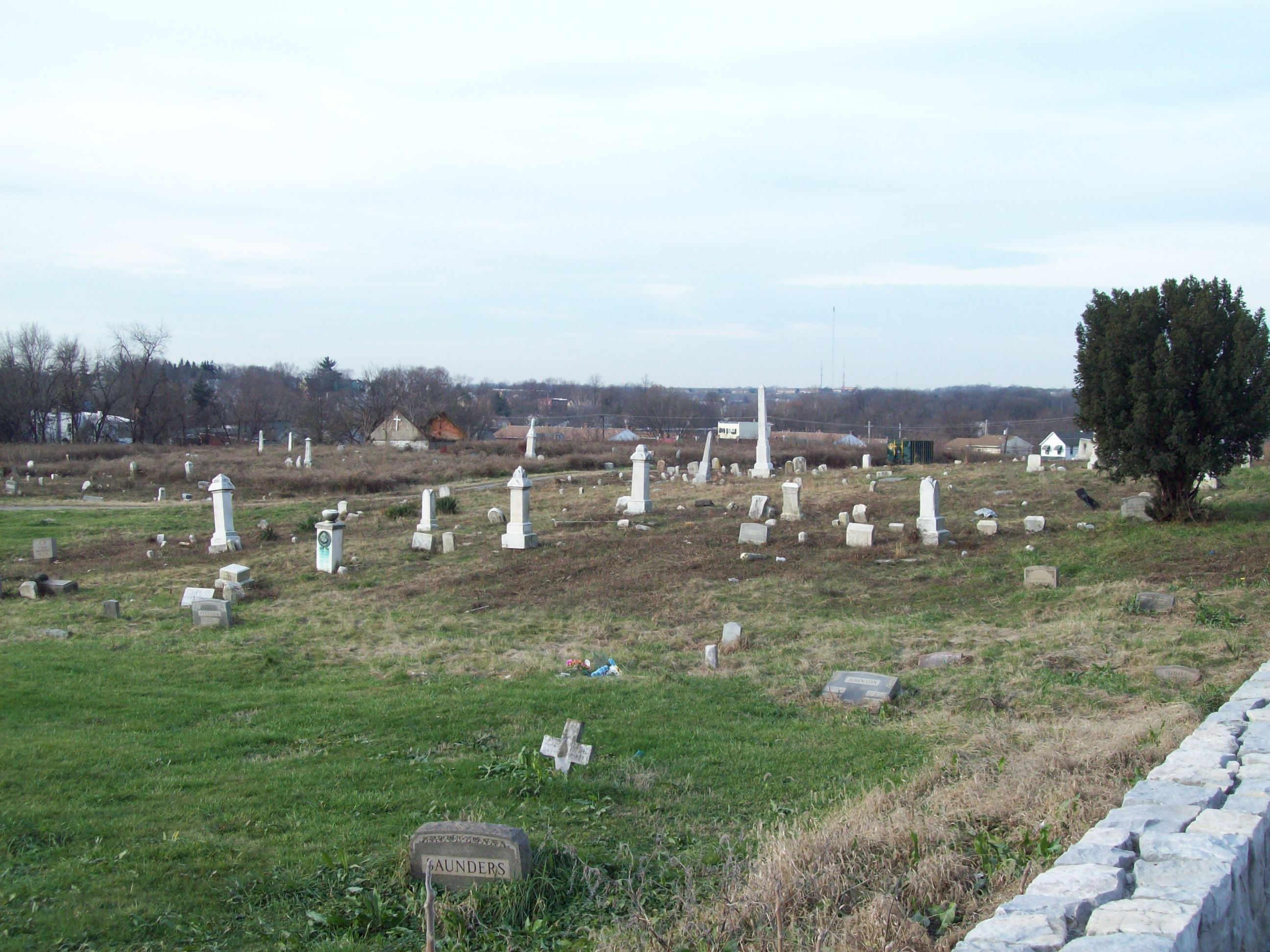
- Mount Auburn Cemetery, December 2011
- Interactive map of Mount Auburn Cemetery
- Location: 2614 Annapolis Rd., Baltimore, Maryland
- Coordinates: 39°15′34″N 76°38′23″W
- Area: 34 acres (14 ha)
- Built: 1872
- Architect: Pinkney, Roland Sr.
- Architectural style: Gothic, Classical Revival, et al.
- NRHP reference No.: 01000456

Significant dates
- Added to NRHP: September 7, 2001
- Designated BCL: 1986

Mount Auburn Cemetery is a historic African American cemetery and national historic district in Baltimore, Maryland, United States. Overlooking the Middle Branch of the Patapsco River to the east, Baltimore's Downtown to the north and railroad tracks to the south, Mt. Auburn Cemetery is surrounded by the Cherry Hill, Westport, Mt. Winans and Lakeland communities.

== History ==
One of the most historic and largest African American cemeteries in Baltimore, Mt. Auburn Cemetery was formed in 1872, by the Reverend James Peck in protest of segregation against the White Methodist Church. Its grounds encompass 34 acres (140,000 m^{2}) and holds more than 55,000 interred.

Designated on the local and national historic registers, the cemetery was once known as "The City of the Dead for Colored People" since it was the only place a person of color could be buried. Once part of a farm, the land was given to the Methodist Church and assigned to the Sharp Street Memorial United Methodist Church to oversee its grounds. Over the years the cemetery has fallen into total neglect with only a portion of its front acreage remaining identifiable as a cemetery.

Mt. Auburn Cemetery holds the remains of some of Baltimore's and the nation's "movers and shakers" of the local civil rights movement. In addition to runaway slaves, the cemetery contains the remains of the first African American ship chandler; clergymen; the first female funeral home director, Civil War and civil rights activists, lawyers, doctors, teachers, military veterans, founders of national fraternities’ and sororities’ and the ancestors of thousands of African-American families.

Mount Auburn Cemetery was added to the National Register of Historic Places in 2001.

== Notable interments ==
- Joe Gans (1874-1910), boxing's first African American World Champion (1901-1908).
- William Ashbie Hawkins (1862-1941), early African American bishop in the African Methodist Church, and one of Baltimore's first African American lawyers.
- Lillie Mae Carroll Jackson (1889-1975), pioneering civil rights activist who brought the National Association for the Advancement of Colored People to Baltimore and was its leader for 35 years.
- Edgar Amos Love (1891-1974), one of three founders of Omega Psi Phi fraternity.
- John H. Murphy Sr. (1840-1922), the founder of the Baltimore Afro-American.
