= List of baseball parks in Baltimore =

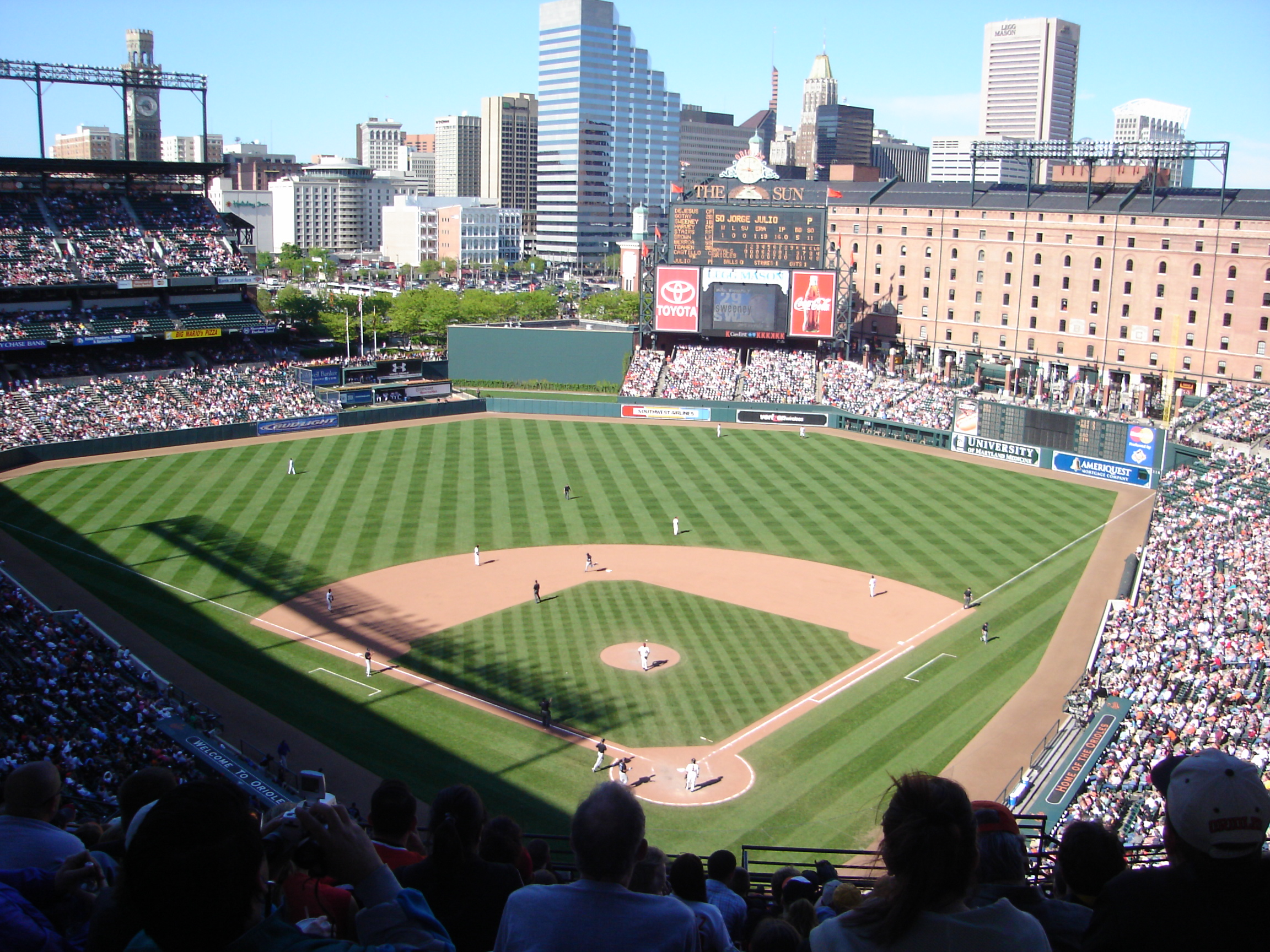
Oriole Park at Camden Yards

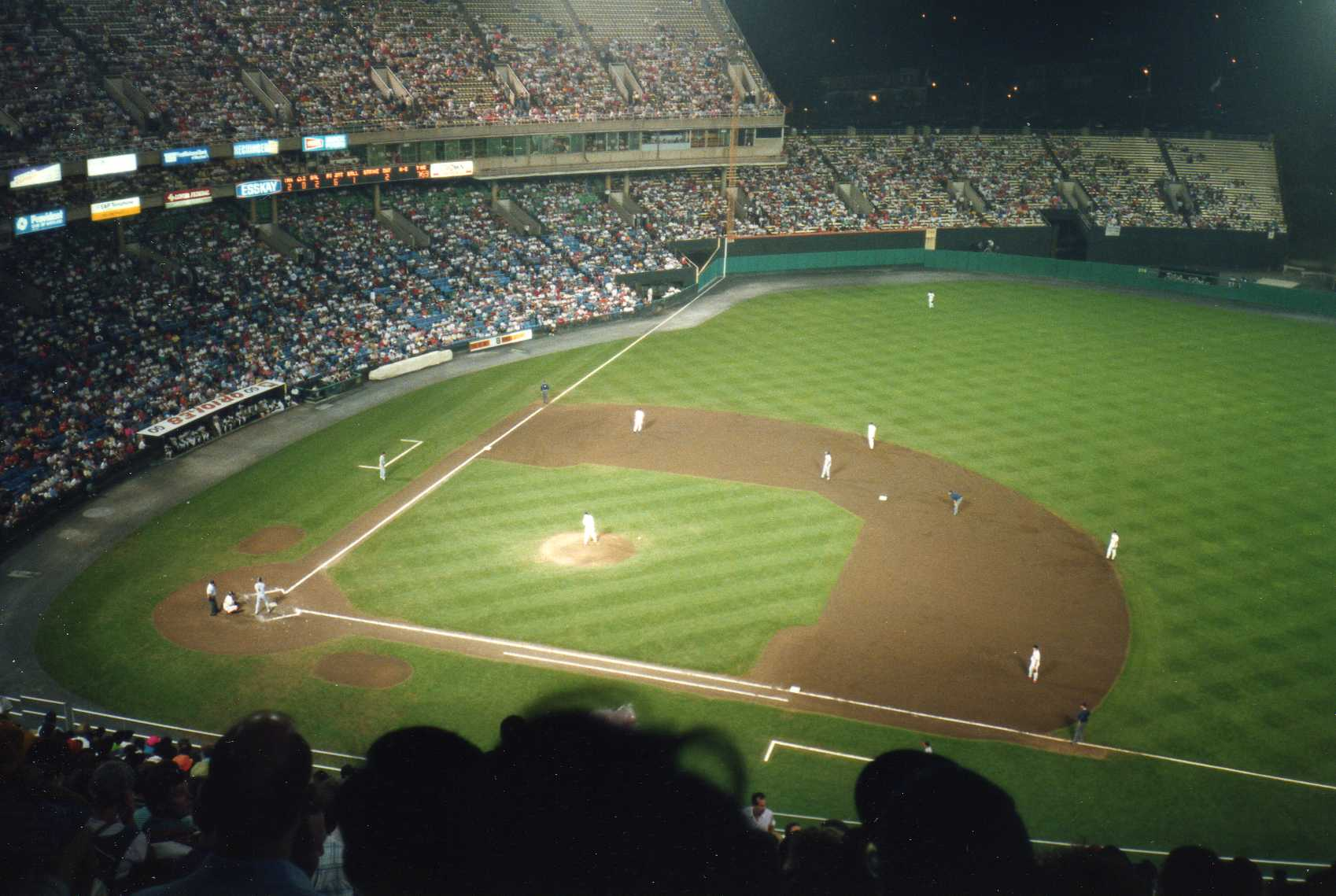
Memorial Stadium

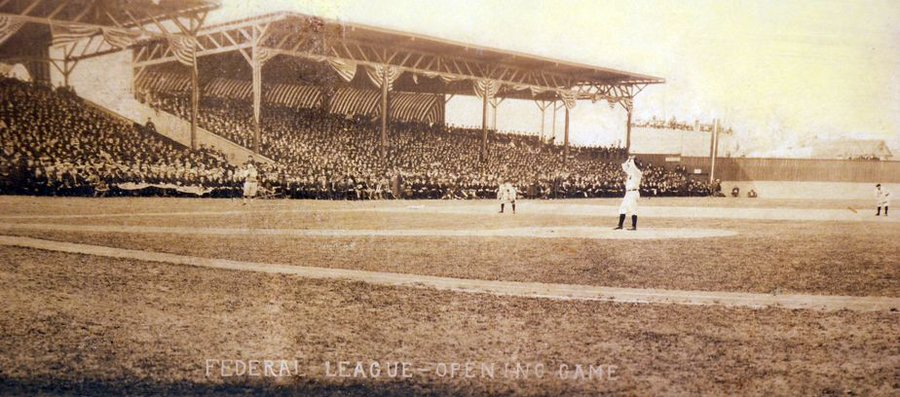
Terrapin Park / Oriole Park (V)

This is a list of venues used for professional baseball in Baltimore, Maryland. The information is a synthesis of the information contained in the references listed.

Flat Rock aka Druid Hill Park
Home of: Excelsior local club (1858-1859)
Location: Eutaw Place (southwest, third base); Flat Rocks (southeast, right field); between the Rogers and Brooks farms; on the former site of Mount Vernon Cemetery.
Currently: under Druid Lake in Druid Hill Park
See SABR article

Excelsior Field
Home of: Excelsior and other local clubs (1859-1860)

One well-publicized game against Excelsior of Brooklyn on September 22, 1860. Jim Creighton's Brooklyn club defeated the locals 51-6.

Location: North Avenue (north, third base / left field); Ross Road (now Druid Hill Avenue) (southwest, first base); eventual Gold Street (southeast, right field); just west of the site of Madison Avenue Grounds, and a few short blocks northeast of the site of Newington Park
Currently: commercial, residential
See SABR article

Madison Avenue Grounds later Monumental Park
Home of: non-league clubs prior to 1873; Maryland – NA (1873); Baltimore – Union Association (1884 - 1 game); Baltimore Eastern League (1884 - partial season)
Location: Madison Avenue (southwest, home base); Boundary Avenue (later North Avenue) (north, beyond third base / left field); Linden Avenue (northeast, center field); old road approximating Robert Street (southeast, right field)
Currently: Residential, churches

Newington Park
Home of: Lord Baltimore – National Association (1872–1874); Baltimore Orioles – American Association (1882)
Location: Pennsylvania Avenue (northeast); Gold Street (southeast); Calhoun Street (southwest); Baker Street (northwest) – a few blocks west-southwest of the Madison Street ballpark – diamond position unknown
Currently: Residential, school, church

Oriole Park (I)
Home of: Baltimore Orioles – American Association (1883–1888)

Also used as a neutral site for one game in the 1887 World Series

Location: Sixth Street / Huntingdon Avenue (later 25th Street) (north, right field); York Road (later Greenmount Avenue) (east, first base); Barclay Street (west, right field); eventual 24th Street (south, left field)
Currently: Residential, commercial

Belair Lot a.k.a. Union Park (I)
Home of: Baltimore – Union Association (1884)
Location - adjacent to Belair Market - contradictory details from two sources:

1. Forrest Street (northeast); Low Street (southeast); Orleans Street (south); Gay Street (northwest)
2. Forrest Street (northeast); Low Street (northwest); Orleans Street end (east); East Street (southwest)

Currently: Commercial buildings, vacant lots

Oriole Park (II)
Home of:

Baltimore Orioles – American Association (1889, mid-1891)
Baltimore Orioles – Atlantic Association (1890)

Location: 10th Street (later 29th) (north, home plate); York Road (later Greenmount) (east, third base, left field); future 9th Street (later 28th) (south, center field); future Barclay Street (west, first base, right field) – three blocks north of previous site
Currently: Residential, commercial

Acton's Park
Home of Baltimore Orioles – Atlantic Association (1890 – some Sunday games)
Location: Brooklyn, Maryland – "just back of [Samuel] Acton's house"; house location described as "South end Ferry Bar Bridge"
Currently: residential and commercial buildings

Union Park (II) a.k.a. Oriole Park (III)
Home of: Baltimore Orioles – American Association (mid-1891) and NL (1892–1899)
Location: 25th Street (north, home plate / third base); Barclay Street (east, left field); approximate line of Hunter Street (west, first base); approximate line of 23rd Street (south, right field) – just west of 1883–1889 site
Currently: Residential, commercial

Oriole Park (IV)
Home of: Baltimore Orioles – American League (1901–1902); Baltimore Orioles – Eastern/International League (1903–1914)
Location: Same as 1890–1891 site – 10th Street (later 29th) (north, home plate); York Road (later Greenmount) (east, third base); 9th Street (later 28th) (south, center field); Barclay (west, first base)
Currently: Residential, commercial

Terrapin Park / Oriole Park V
Home of: Baltimore Terrapins – Federal League (1914–1915); Baltimore Orioles – IL (1916–mid-1944)
Location: 10th Street (later 29th) (south, first base); York Road (later Greenmount) (east, right field); 11th Street (later 30th) (north, left field); Vineyard Lane (originally Gilmore Lane) (northwest, third base) – just across the street to the north from previous Oriole Park; Barclay now cuts through the property.
Currently: Commercial businesses

Westport Park
Home of: Baltimore Black Sox (1917–1920)
Location: Westport neighborhood – Annapolis Road (State Highway 648) (west, home plate); Clare Street, then Waterview Avenue (to the south, right field); Patapsco River (to the east, center field); Ridgleys Cove (to the north, left field)
Currently: vacant

Maryland Park
Home of: Baltimore Black Sox – Negro leagues (1923–1932)
Location: Bush Street and a branch of Ridgleys Cove (northeast, third base); Annapolis Road (State Highway 648) (northwest, first base); Ridgleys Cove (south and southeast, outfield); half a mile or so north of Westport Park
Currently: Wheelabrator Baltimore
A picture of the ballpark
Ballpark outline faintly visible on Sanborn map

Bugle Field
Home of: Baltimore Black Sox – Negro leagues (1932–1934); Baltimore Elite Giants – Negro leagues (1938–1949)
Location: Federal Street (south, first base); 1601 Edison Highway (west, third base); railroad tracks (northeast, outfield)
Currently: vacant lot, previously Rockland Industries plant

Westport Stadium a.k.a. Westport Park (II)
Home of: Baltimore Elite Giants 1950
Location: Westport neighborhood – 3008 Annapolis Road (State Highway 648) (east); Baltimore-Washington Parkway (State Highway 295) (west); West Patapsco Avenue (south)
Currently: commercial / industrial
Pictures of the ballpark

Memorial Stadium
Home of: Baltimore Orioles – IL (mid-1944–1953); Baltimore Orioles – American League (1954–1991); Bowie Baysox, Eastern League (1993)
Location: 33rd Street (south, home plate); Ellerslie Avenue (west, third base); 36th Street (north, center field); Ednor Road (east, first base)
Currently: Public park amidst commercial and residential development

Oriole Park at Camden Yards
Home of: Baltimore Orioles – AL (1992–present)
Location: 333 West Camden Street – Camden Street (north, left field); Eutaw Street (east, right field); Briscoe and Houser Streets (south, first base); Conway Street (west, third base)

== See also ==
- Lists of baseball parks

== Sources ==
- Ballparks of North America, Michael Benson, McFarland, 1989.
- House of Magic, by the Baltimore Orioles, 1991.
- Green Cathedrals, by Phil Lowry, several editions.
- The Home Team, by James H. Bready, several editions.
- The Federal League of 1914–1915, by Marc Okkonen, SABR, 1989.
- Baseball Memories, by Marc Okkonen, Sterling Publishing, 1992.
