= Blackout (wartime) =

Minimisation of light to stop aircraft identification of targets

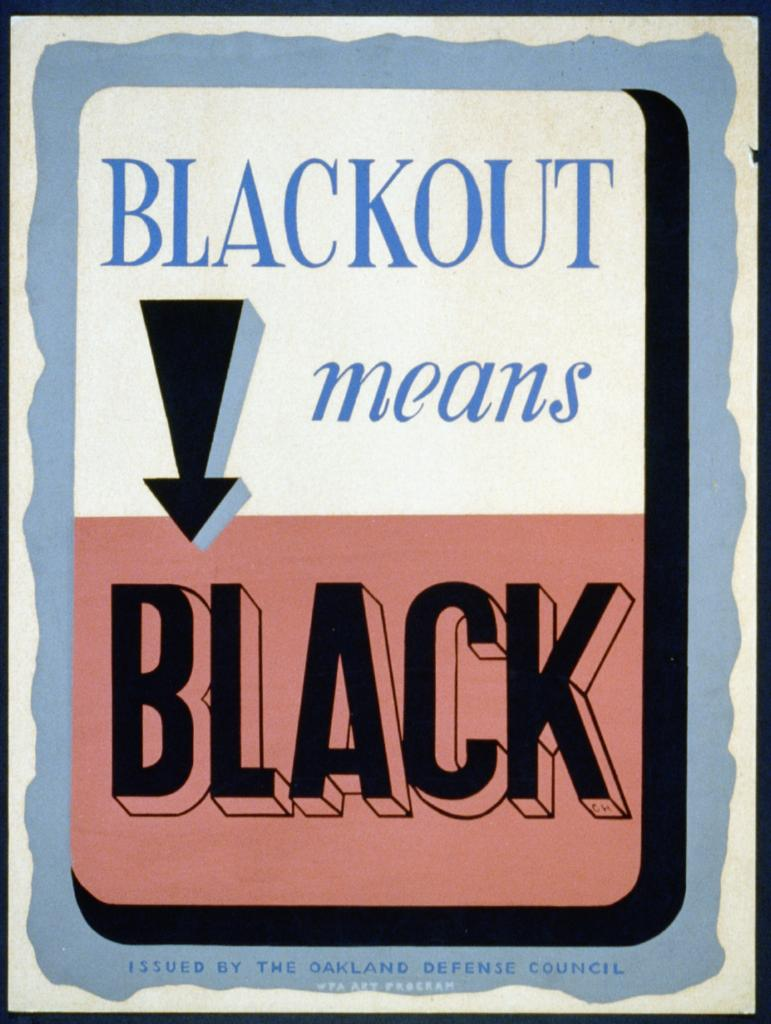
American poster from World War II, reminding citizens of blackouts for civil defense.

A blackout during war, or in preparation for an expected war, is the practice of collectively minimizing outdoor light, including upwardly directed (or reflected) light. This was done in the 20th century to prevent crews of enemy aircraft from being able to identify their targets by sight, such as during the London Blitz of 1940. In coastal regions, a shoreside blackout of city lights also helped protect ships from being seen silhouetted against the artificial light by enemy submarines further out at sea.

== World War I ==
=== United Kingdom ===
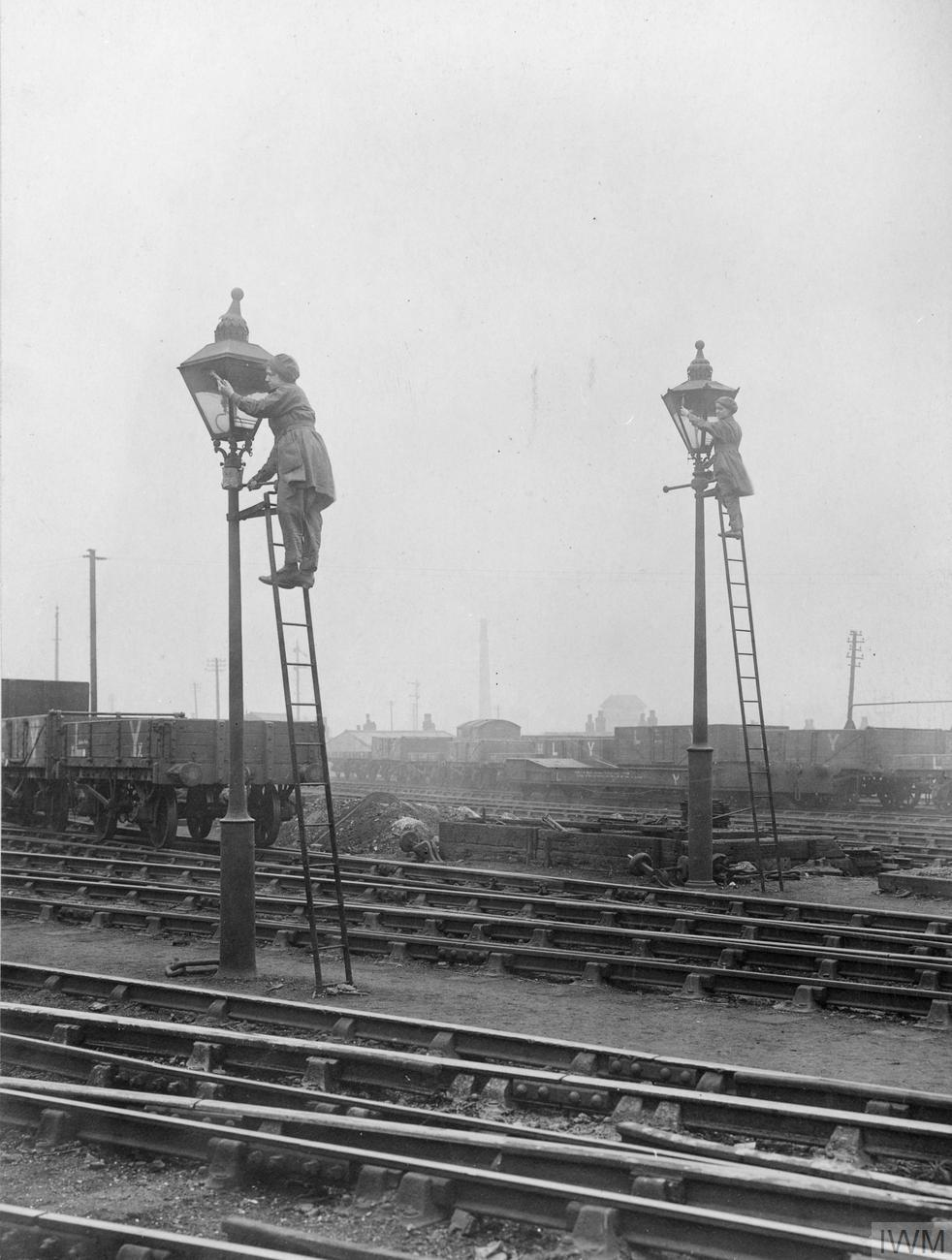
Employees of the Lancashire and Yorkshire Railway obscuring lamps to comply with lighting restrictions, 15 May 1917

Plans to black out British coastal towns in the event of war were drawn up in 1913 by Winston Churchill in his role as First Lord of the Admiralty; these plans were implemented on 12 August 1914, eight days after the United Kingdom had entered the war. On 1 October 1914, the Commissioner of the Metropolitan Police ordered that bright exterior lights were to be extinguished or dimmed in the London area and street lamps be partially painted out with black paint. Elsewhere, the matter was left to local authorities. Following the start of the German strategic bombing campaign early in 1915, ordinary people in towns without blackouts sometimes took the law into their own hands, smashing street lamps which they thought might attract an air raid. Blackout restrictions were extended to the whole of England in February 1916.

=== France ===
In France, a blackout was implemented for Paris at the start of the Zeppelin campaign in the spring of 1915, but was later relaxed, only to be reintroduced in the spring of 1918 when the Germans began using heavy bombers against the city.

=== Germany ===
In Germany, a blackout was only enforced in a zone 150 kilometres (93 miles) behind the Western Front.

== World War II ==
=== United Kingdom ===
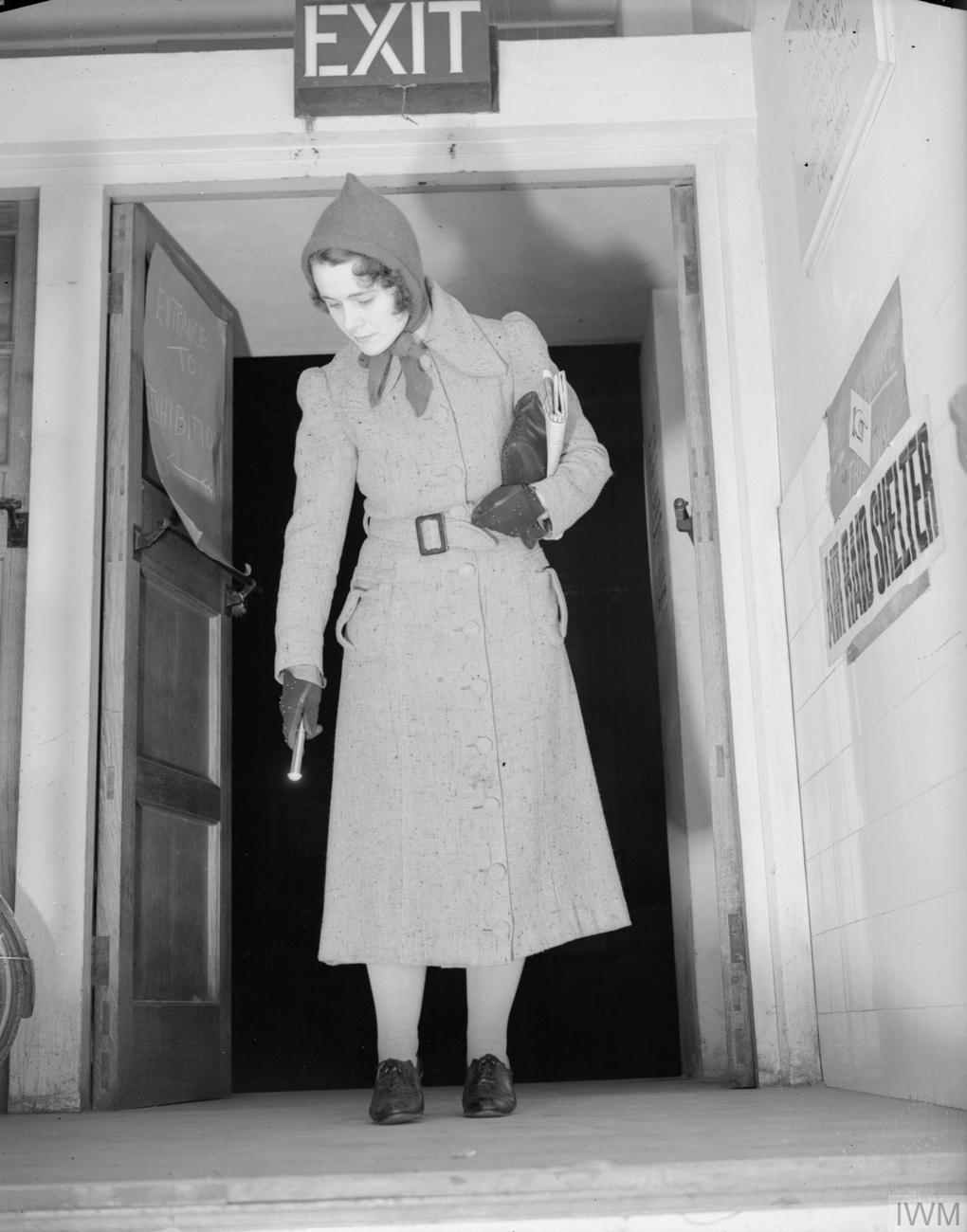
A Londoner pointing a torch at the ground during a blackout to find her way home at night in 1940

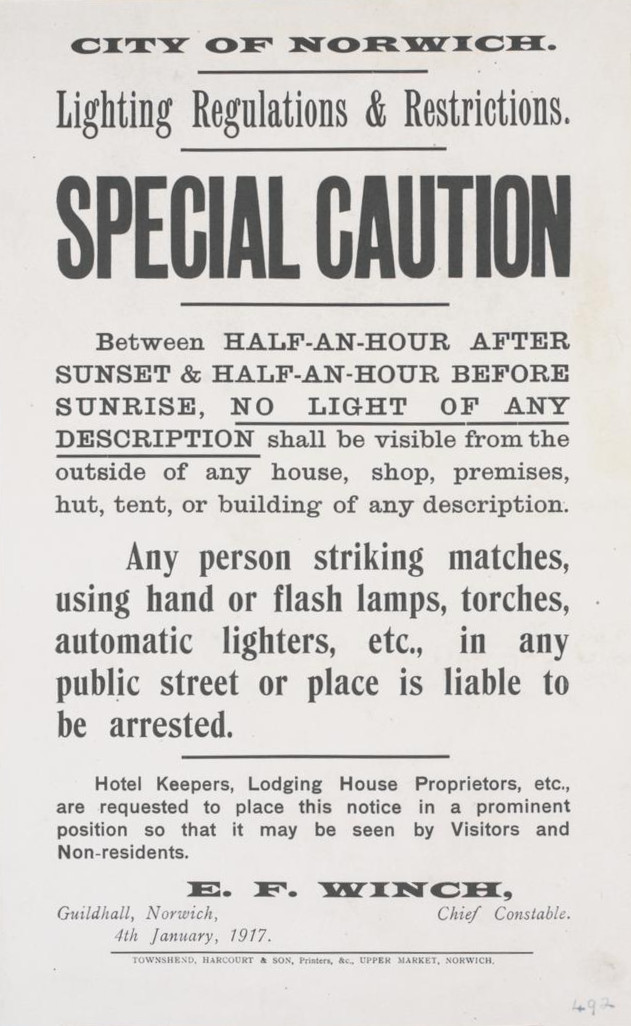
Blackout regulations in Norwich, England during the First World War.

During World War II, the Air Ministry had forecast that Britain would suffer night air bombing attacks causing large numbers of civilian casualties and mass destruction. It was widely agreed that navigation and targeting would be more difficult if man-made lights on the ground could be extinguished. As early as July 1939, Public Information Leaflet No 2 (part of the Air Raid Precautions (A.R.P.) training literature) warned of the need for popular discipline to ensure that the blackout regulations were fully enforced during the blackout periods.

Blackout regulations were imposed on 1 September 1939, before the declaration of war. These required that all windows and doors should be covered at night with suitable material such as heavy curtains, cardboard or paint, to prevent the escape of any glimmer of light which might aid enemy aircraft. The Government ensured that the necessary materials were available. External lights such as street lights were switched off, or dimmed and shielded to deflect light downward. Essential lights such as traffic lights and vehicle headlights were fitted with slotted covers to deflect their beams downwards to the ground.

Shops and factories had particular problems. Factories with large areas of glass roofing found it impossible to install temporary blackout panels and permanent methods (such as paint) lost natural light during daylight. Shops had to install double "airlock" doors to avoid lights showing as customers arrived and departed.

Blackouts proved one of the more unpleasant aspects of the war, disrupting many civilian activities and causing widespread grumbling and lower morale.

The blackout was enforced by civilian ARP wardens who would ensure that no buildings allowed the slightest peek or glow of light. Offenders were liable to stringent legal penalties.

Blackout restrictions greatly raised the dangers of night driving and fatalities increased as a consequence. As a result, some aspects were relaxed and speed limits were lowered. Fatalities were also recorded amongst merchant seamen falling into the docks at night and drowning during the blackout.

Crime also increased under the cover of darkness, from looting, theft, burglary, robbery, fraud, and gang activities, to rape and murder, and even serial murder.

As German war-making capability declined, a "dim-out" was introduced in September 1944, which allowed lighting to the equivalent of moonlight. A full blackout would be imposed if an alert was sounded. Full lighting of streets was allowed in April 1945; on 30 April, the day Hitler committed suicide, Big Ben was lit, 5 years and 123 days after the blackout was first imposed.

=== United States ===
An animation of a moving ship silhouetted against city lights

Since the attack on Pearl Harbor, the continental United States was exposed to air attacks while engaging in a war with Japan, such as the bombing of Dutch Harbor, the Lookout Air Raids, and the Fu-Go balloon bombs, but these were considered minor or negligible and did nothing to damage American morale and war effort. Along the Atlantic coast, the lack of a coastal blackout served to silhouette Allied shipping and thus expose vessels to German submarine attack. Coastal communities resisted the imposition of a blackout for amenity reasons, citing potential damage to tourism. The result was a disastrous loss of shipping, dubbed by German submariners as the "Second Happy Time".

=== Effectiveness ===
M. R. D. Foot argues that blackouts did not impair navigation by bombers because navigators focused more on reflective bodies of water, railroad tracks, or large highways.

== Techniques ==
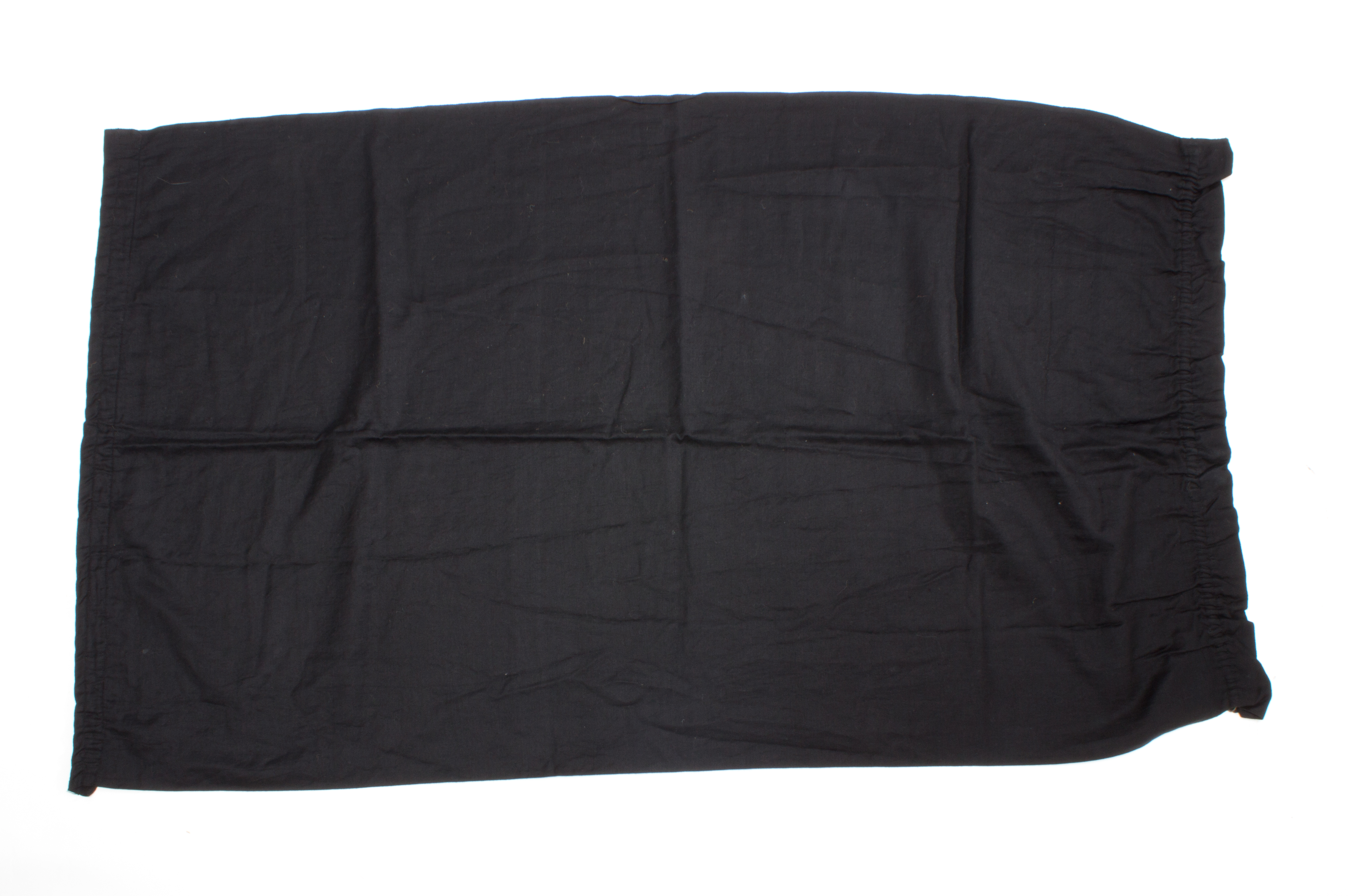
A blackout curtain used in Auckland, New Zealand during World War II.

Lights can simply be turned off or light can sometimes be minimized by tarring the windows of large public structures. In World War II, a dark blackout curtain was used to keep the light inside. Tarring the windows can mean a semi-permanent blackout status.

During the 1940s and 1950s, cities such as Detroit would practice blackout air raid drills. During this time, the city's Civil Defense workers would immediately activate the neighborhood air raid siren and families would be required to do the following in order:

1. Shut off all appliances, such as stoves, ovens, furnaces.
2. Shut off valves for water and natural gas or propane, as well as disconnect electricity.
3. Close blackout curtains (plain black curtains that would block light from coming in or going out). This step was changed after the atomic age began: where white curtains were used to reflect the thermal flash of the bomb, black curtains were used in World War II to prevent any airborne enemies from seeing light from windows.
4. Get to a public shelter, a fallout or bomb shelter, or the household basement, and stay there until the local police or block warden dismissed the blackout.

== Modern technology ==
The benefits of blackouts against air attack are now largely nullified in the face of a technologically sophisticated enemy. As early as World War II, aircraft were using radio-beam navigation (see "Battle of the Beams"), and targets were detected by air-to-ground radar, (e.g. H2X). Today, not only are night-vision goggles readily available to air crews, but sophisticated satellite-based and inertial navigation systems enable a static target to be found easily by aircraft and guided missiles. Nevertheless, during the 1991 Gulf War, authorities in Baghdad practiced blackouts along with other civil defence procedures, before the Gulf War air campaign began striking the city.
