= Burgee (surname) =

Burgee is a surname. Notable people with the surname include:

- John Burgee (born 1933), American architect
- Louis Burgee (1890–1966), American baseball player

== See also ==
- Burges
