= Norman Triplett (baseball) =

American baseball player

- Outfielder
- Born: October 18, 1892; La Mott, Pennsylvania
- Died: October 20, 1918 (aged 26); France

Negro league baseball debut
- 1917, for the Hilldale Club

Last appearance
- 1917, for the Hilldale Club

Teams
- Hilldale Club (1917)

Norman Triplett (October 18, 1892 – October 20, 1918) was an American Negro league outfielder in the 1910s.

A native of La Mott, Pennsylvania, Triplett played for the Hilldale Club in 1917. In two recorded games, he posted two hits with an RBI in eight plate appearances. Triplett died of pneumonia in 1918 at age 26 while serving in the US Army in France during World War I.
