= Doc Sykes =

American baseball player

- Pitcher
- Born: April 10, 1892; Decatur, Alabama
- Died: November 10, 1986 (aged 94); Baltimore, Maryland
- Batted: Right Threw: Right

Negro league baseball debut
- 1914, for the Brooklyn Royal Giants

Last appearance
- 1924, for the Baltimore Black Sox

Teams
- Brooklyn Royal Giants (1914); Lincoln Giants (1914); Lincoln Stars (1915–1916); Brooklyn Royal Giants (1916); Lincoln Giants (1917); Hilldale Club (1917–1918); Baltimore Black Sox (1920–1924)

Frank Jehoy Sykes (April 10, 1892 – November 10, 1986), nicknamed "Doc", was an American Negro league pitcher in the 1910s and 1920s.

A native of Decatur, Alabama, Sykes was the brother of fellow Negro leaguer Melvin Sykes. He attended Atlanta Baptist College and Howard University College of Medicine. He broke into professional baseball in 1914 with the Brooklyn Royal Giants, but his longest tenure was with the Baltimore Black Sox in the early 1920s. In 1922, Sykes tossed a no-hitter for Baltimore against the Bacharach Giants at Maryland Baseball Park.

After his baseball career, Sykes returned to Decatur to practice dentistry. While living in Decatur in 1931, he provided critical testimony in the Scottsboro Boys trial, challenging the fairness of an all-white jury in the case. The backlash of his involvement in the case eventually caused him to move to Baltimore, Maryland, where he continued his dental practice and lived until his death in 1986 at age 94.
