= Camptown Historic District =

Historic district in Pennsylvania, United States

- U.S. National Register of Historic Places
- U.S. Historic district
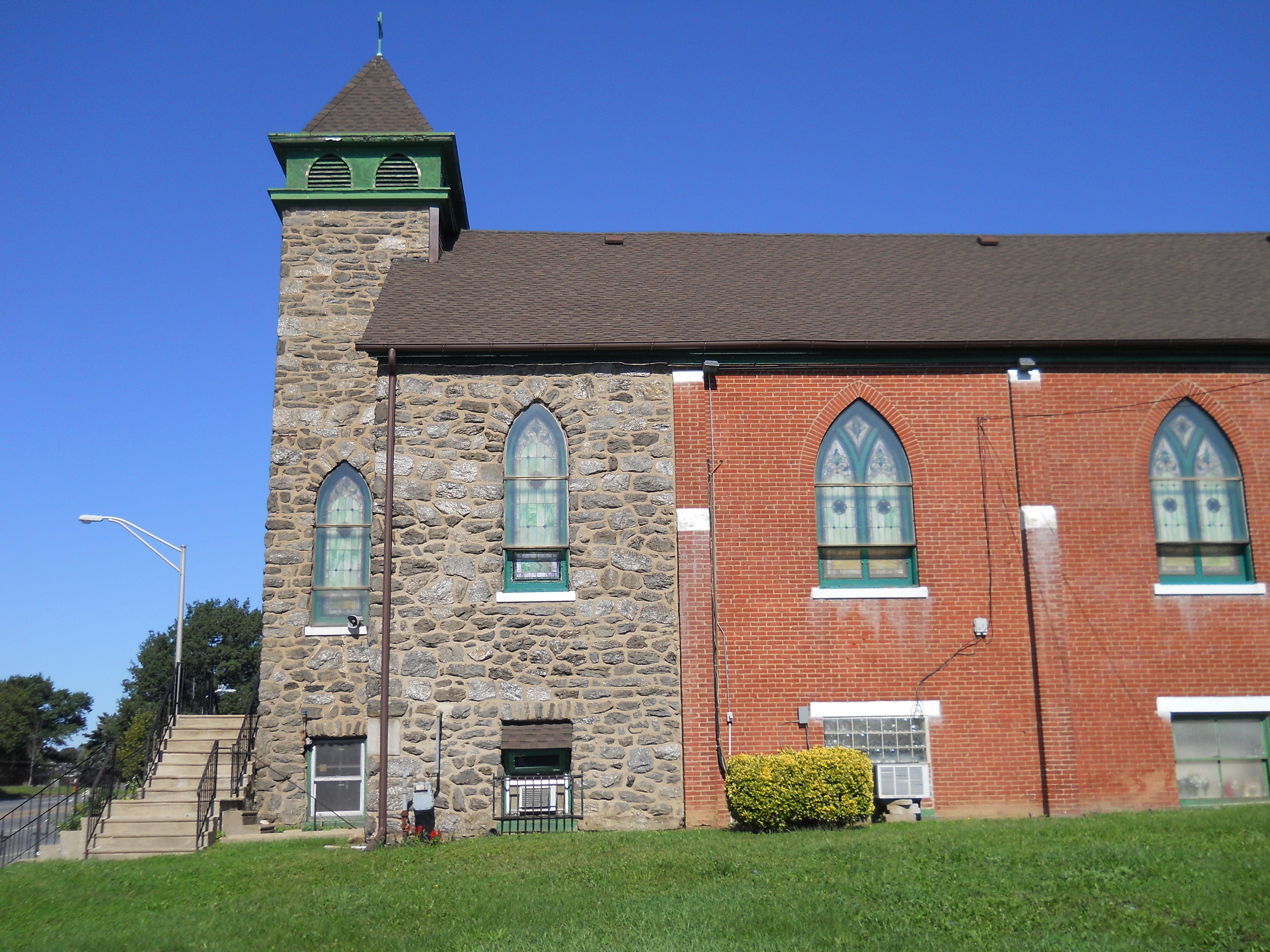
- La Mott A M E Church

- Location within Philadelphia
- Location: Roughly bounded by Penrose Ave., Graham Ln., Dennis St., and Cheltenham Ave., La Mott, Pennsylvania
- Coordinates: 40°3′57″N 75°8′40″W
- Area: 26 acres (11 ha)
- Architect: Multiple
- Architectural style: Italianate, Gothic Revival, Other, Carpenter Gothic
- NRHP reference No.: 85003434
- Added to NRHP: October 31, 1985

The Camptown Historic District, also known as the La Mott Historic District and Camp William Penn, is a national historic district located in La Mott, Pennsylvania, United States. The area played a crucial role in the American Civil War; from 1863 to 1865 when it hosted Camp William Penn, a military training post for African-American soldiers. Following the war, many of those soldiers bought homes in the area. The district also contained the residence of the prominent Quaker abolitionist and suffragist Lucretia Mott. This home, called "Roadside," was also a stop on the Underground Railroad. The area was originally to be formally designated "Camptown," but, since there was already another community in Pennsylvania by that name, "La Mott" was chosen instead when the post office was established in 1885.

The district covers 26 acres, and includes 35 contributing buildings. It was listed in the National Register of Historic Places in 1985.
