= Fred Pinder =

American baseball player

- Shortstop
- Born: January 5, 1891; Philadelphia, Pennsylvania, U.S.
- Died: March 5, 1955 (aged 64); La Mott, Pennsylvania, U.S.
- Threw: Right

Negro league baseball debut
- 1917, for the Hilldale Club

Last appearance
- 1917, for the Hilldale Club

Teams
- Hilldale Club (1917)

Fredrick Pinder (January 5, 1891 – March 5, 1955) was an American Negro league shortstop in the 1910s.

A native of Philadelphia, Pennsylvania, Pinder played for the Hilldale Club in 1917. In his nine recorded games, he posted nine hits in 37 plate appearances. Pinder died in La Mott, Pennsylvania in 1955 at age 64.
