= Lakeland, Baltimore =

Coordinates: 39°15′18″N 76°38′52″W

Lakeland Silver Lake
- neighborhood statistical area
- Location within Baltimore
- Country: United States
- State: Maryland
- City: Baltimore
- Time zone: UTC-5 (Eastern)
  - Summer (DST): UTC-4 (EDT)
- ZIP code: 21230
- Area code: 410, 443, and 667

Lakeland is a neighborhood in south Baltimore, Maryland. Its borders are Annapolis Road on the east, the Baltimore city/county line to the south, a CSX/MARC Railroad line to the west, and the same railroad line to the north.

== History ==
The communities of Westport, Mount Winans, and Lakeland are some of the oldest in Baltimore City. As early as 1675, settlers established small farms in the area. In July 1732, Dr. Charles Carroll of Annapolis was granted a patent out of the Land Office of Maryland for property he named "Georgia." This grant had been surveyed for him in November 1731. Though the survey recited 2360 acres, Georgia was later found to contain 2481.9 acres. He would call his grant the "Georgia Plantation." See history and a copy of "Georgia Plantation Map at Mount Clare Museum House. Carroll's Georgia Plantation covered the present-day neighborhoods of Westport, Mount Winans, Morrell Park, and Violetville. Carroll deeded the Westport tracts over to the Baltimore Iron Works Company, a partnership of which he was managing partner and included, among other partners, his distant cousins Daniel Carroll of Duddington and Charles Carroll of Annapolis, who was then Attorney General of Provincial Maryland and who would in 1737 become the father of Charles Carroll of Carrollton.

With its large furnace near the mouth of the Gwynns Falls, the Baltimore Iron Works smelted and forged iron ore dug from pits along the old Annapolis Road and the Westport waterfront, where ships received the excavated loads. A small community of two-story brick homes grew up near the pits on old Annapolis Road to house the workers employed there and their families. The community was dubbed "Minersville" (in the area now known as Lakeland). In 1836, Harmon's Three-Cent Bridge, a two hundred foot wooden span, carried Annapolis Road across the Gwynns Falls towards the center City. Shortly afterwards, a number of shoreline resorts opened on the southern banks of Middle Branch.

== Demographics ==
Race/Ethnicity The race and ethnicity distribution of Westport/Mt. Winans/Lakeland compared to Baltimore City overall (2010).

Westport/Mt. Winans/Lakeland Baltimore City

Black or African American 66.1% 63.6%

White 23.3% 29.7%

Asian 2.0% 2.4%

Hispanic or Latino 13.1% 4.2%

1Hispanic or Latino ethnicity overlaps with other race categories.

2 Some other race includes American Indian or Alaska Native, Native Hawaiian or Other Pacific Islander, and choosing other races as an option on the census.

Source: 2010 US Census.

== Amenities ==
Lakeland Elementary and Middle School, Lakeland Recreation, Lakeland Park, West Patapsco Flea Market, Hollinswood Shopping Center, Lakeland Coalition 's Green and Clean Team, Freedom Temple AME Zion Church, 2926 Hollins Ferry Rd, Faith Tabernacle Church, Lakeland Community Association Partnership
