= Tom Dixon (catcher) =

American baseball player

- Catcher
- Born: March 30, 1906; Philadelphia, Pennsylvania, U.S.
- Died: October, 1982; Philadelphia, Pennsylvania, U.S.
- Batted: Unknown Threw: Unknown

Negro league baseball debut
- 1930, for the Hilldale Club

Last appearance
- 1936, for the Bacharach Giants
- Stats at Baseball Reference

Teams
- Hilldale Club (1930, 1932); Baltimore Black Sox (1934); Bacharach Giants (1936)

Thomas Penelton Dixon Jr. (March 30, 1906 – October 1982) was an American professional baseball catcher in the Negro leagues. He played with the Hilldale Club, Baltimore Black Sox, and Bacharach Giants from 1930 to 1936.
