= Cornelius Rhoades =

American baseball player

- Catcher
- Born: June 4, 1892; Camden, New Jersey, U.S.

Negro league baseball debut
- 1917, for the Hilldale Club

Last appearance
- 1917, for the Hilldale Club

Teams
- Hilldale Club (1917)

Cornelius Rhoades (June 4, 1892 – death unknown) was an American Negro league catcher in the 1910s.

A native of Camden, New Jersey, Rhoades played for the Hilldale Club in 1917. In his eight recorded games, he posted five hits and four walks in 33 plate appearances.
