= John Richardson (baseball) =

American baseball player

- Third baseman

Negro league baseball debut
- 1922, for the Hilldale Club

Last appearance
- 1924, for the Birmingham Black Barons

Teams
- Hilldale Club (1922); Birmingham Black Barons (1924)

John Richardson is an American former Negro league third baseman who played in the 1920s.

Richardson made his Negro leagues debut in 1922 with the Hilldale Club. He went on to play for the Birmingham Black Barons in 1924.
