= Bugle Field =

Former baseball stadium in Baltimore, Maryland

Coordinates: 39°18′34.5″N 76°34′19.2″W

Bugle Field was a predominantly wooden stadium in Baltimore used by the two primary Negro league teams of the era from 1916 to 1950, the Baltimore Black Sox (1916–1933) and the Baltimore Elite Giants (1938–1950). The Black Sox had a short tenure at the park, moving into the park permanently in 1932 before folding during the 1934 season. The Elite Giants were the park's primary tenants until its dismantlement during the 1949 Negro National League Championship Series. It was located on the northeast corner of Federal Street and Edison Highway, address 1601 Edison Highway. The site is in use today as the headquarters and local manufacturing plant of Rockland Industries, the first major corporation on record in Baltimore County, Maryland.

An earlier Negro league baseball field was the "Maryland Baseball Park", 1923–1929. Games were also played at the old Westport Stadium, near Old Annapolis Road (Maryland Route 648) and Waterview Avenue, in the Westport neighborhood of southwest Baltimore. The site location was impacted by the routing and construction, in the early 1950s, of the Baltimore–Washington Parkway (Interstate 295) going north into downtown on Russell Street.

Players that the field served include Major League Baseball and Negro league players Roy Campanella, Leon Day, Joe Black, Junior Gilliam, Jud Wilson, "The Ghost" Oliver Marcelle, and Dick Lundy. Short-time Washington Senators player Lou Thuman was said to have been discovered by Senators scouts while playing at Bugle Field, which was owned by the owners of the Senators ball club, also operators of a local laundry. Thuman played a total of five games in 1939 and 1940 with the Senators before being drafted into World War II and enduring a career-ending injury.

Bugle Field had opened in 1910 and its 40th season was its last. The final game was played on September 18, 1949. The Elites defeated the Chicago American Giants 5–4 to take a two-games-to-none lead in the playoff series. Despite being compelled to stage their next game at a neutral site in Virginia and finish the series in Chicago, the Elites went on to sweep the Giants four games to none.

== Sources ==
- Baseball in Baltimore, The First 100 Years, by James H. Bready.
- Baltimore News-American Newspaper, September 1949.
- Baltimore Afro-American Newspaper, September 1949.
