= John Perrigan =

American baseball player

- Second baseman
- Born: March 25, 1892; Chester, Pennsylvania, U.S.
- Died: August 1, 1966 (aged 74); Chester, Pennsylvania, U.S.

Negro league baseball debut
- 1921, for the Hilldale Club

Last appearance
- 1921, for the Hilldale Club

Teams
- Hilldale Club (1921)

John Robert Perrigan (March 25, 1892 – August 1, 1966) was an American Negro league second baseman in the 1920s.

A native of Chester, Pennsylvania, Perrigan played for the Hilldale Club in 1921. In 11 recorded games, he posted five hits in 32 plate appearances. Perrigan died in his hometown of Chester in 1966 at age 74.
