= Melvin Sykes =

American baseball player

- Outfielder
- Born: January 10, 1901; Decatur, Alabama, US
- Died: March, 1984; Decatur, Alabama, US
- Batted: Right Threw: Right

Negro league baseball debut
- 1926, for the Hilldale Club

Last appearance
- 1926, for the Lincoln Giants
- Stats at Baseball Reference

Teams
- Hilldale Club (1926); Lincoln Giants (1926)

Melvin Elijah Sykes (January 10, 1901 – March, 1984) was an American Negro league outfielder in 1926.

A native of Decatur, Alabama, Sykes was the brother of fellow Negro leaguer Doc Sykes. Younger brother Melvin attended Morehouse College, where he was captain of the baseball and basketball teams, and graduated in 1926. His Negro league career was limited to a single season, 1926, when he split time between the Hilldale Club and the Lincoln Giants.

After his brief professional baseball career, Sykes worked in real estate in New York, but eventually returned to Decatur, where he became involved in various organizations including the Alabama Democratic Conference. Sykes died in Decatur in 1984 at age 83.
