= Jay Valentine =

American baseball player

- Outfielder
- Threw: Left

Negro league baseball debut
- 1914, for the Philadelphia Giants

Last appearance
- 1917, for the Hilldale Club

Teams
- Philadelphia Giants (1914); Hilldale Club (1917)

Jay Valentine was an American Negro league outfielder in the 1910s.

Valentine made his Negro leagues debut in 1914 with the Philadelphia Giants. He went on to play for the Hilldale Club in 1917.
