= William Fuller (baseball) =

American baseball player

- Second baseman
- Born: August 2, 1889; New York, New York, U.S.
- Threw: Right

Negro league baseball debut
- 1915, for the Cuban Giants

Last appearance
- 1918, for the Hilldale Club

Teams
- Cuban Giants (1915); Bacharach Giants (1917); Hilldale Club (1917–1918)

William Fuller (August 2, 1889 – death date unknown) was an American Negro league second baseman in the 1910s.

A native of New York, New York, Fuller made his Negro leagues debut in 1915 with the Cuban Giants. He went on to play for the Bacharach Giants and Hilldale Club.
