= Cliney Allen =

American baseball player

- Pitcher
- Born: 1910 (age 115–116); North Carolina, U.S.
- Threw: Right

Negro league baseball debut
- 1932, for the Hilldale Club

Last appearance
- 1932, for the Bacharach Giants
- Stats at Baseball Reference

Teams
- Hilldale Club (1932); Bacharach Giants (1932)

Cliney Allen (1910 – death date unknown) was an American professional baseball pitcher in the Negro leagues. He played with the Hilldale Club and the Bacharach Giants in 1932.
