= Rockland Industries =

American textile manufacturing company

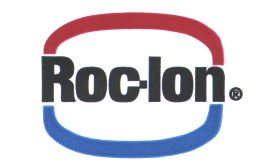
- Industry: Textile manufacturing
- Headquarters: Baltimore, Maryland

Rockland Industries, Inc. was a textile manufacturing company in the United States. The company was headquartered in Baltimore, Maryland, and had manufacturing facilities in Bamberg, South Carolina. Rockland Industries had sales in more than 90 countries worldwide, including the United States.

== History ==
Rockland Industries was founded as Rockland Bleach and Dye Works in 1831 by three brothers from England - James, Robert, and John Wright. The company was formed in the Rockland Historic District of Brooklandville, an area of present-day Baltimore, and is recorded as the oldest corporation in Baltimore County. Rockland Bleach and Dye Works produced cotton and Irish woolens for the United States market.

The location of the headquarters and Baltimore manufacturing on Edison Highway was once Bugle Field, which was primarily used as a Negro league baseball field that was home to the Baltimore Elite Giants and Baltimore Black Sox from the late 1920s until around 1950. It was home to great players such as Roy Campanella, and was also the site that several Major League Baseball players were discovered, as Bugle Field was owned by the owners of the former Washington Senators and a local laundering company.

In 1944, Alexander Leaderman, a decorated U.S. Army officer, purchased the company after returning home from WWII and renamed it Rockland Industries. The company introduced curtain linings treated for sunlight and moisture resistance. In 1963, the company patented Roc-lon Rain-No-Stain, a curtain lining with insulation and stain-repellent properties. The product received the Good Housekeeping Seal of Approval in 1964.

Rockland sold its Roc-lon Blackout blackout fabrics and drapery linings to the commercial hotel and hospitality trade as well as to the retail and residential markets. The company's blackout fabrics were used in various U.S. government and military facilities.

Rockland manufactured drapery linings.

On October 5, 2021, Rockland filed for Chapter 11 bankruptcy, with a rise in global competition and trade policies cited as the cause.

== Awards ==
Good Housekeeping Seal of Approval –- 1964

U.S. Department of Commerce 'E' Award for Export Excellence—1992

U.S. Department of Commerce 'E Star' Award for Export Excellence –- 1995
