= Blackout (fabric) =

Foam-backed, opaque fabric

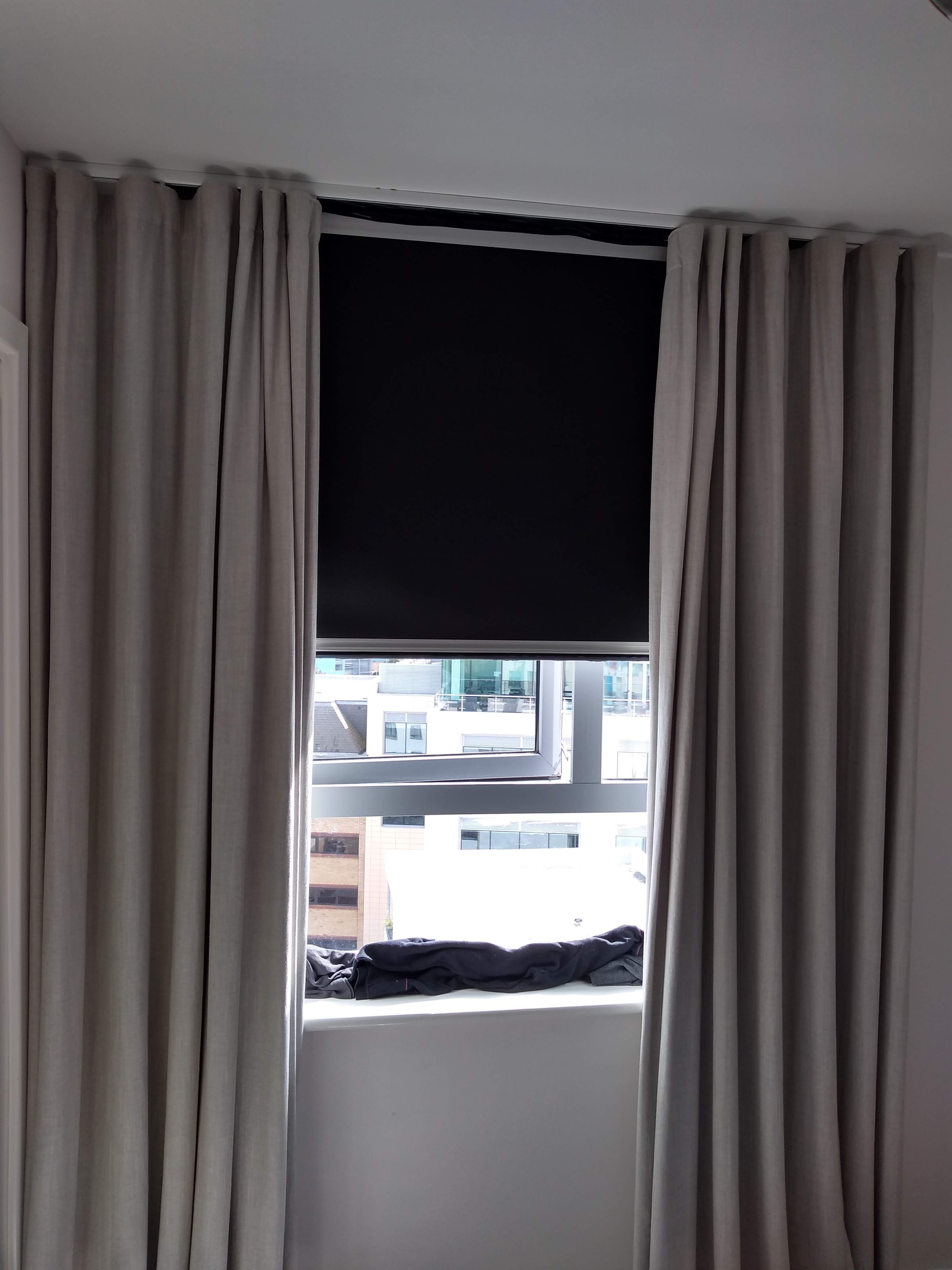
A blackout curtain and window blind.

Blackout refers to a foam-backed, opaque fabric used to black out light. Blackout fabrics are most commonly found in hotel rooms as curtain linings or drapery fabrics, blocking much of the light that would otherwise enter through a window when the curtains are closed. For travelers, third shift workers, and parents of babies, blackout is an essential element in the bedroom. Besides window coverings, other uses for blackout fabrics include wallpaper, movie projector screens and planetarium domes.

They are particularly popular for shift workers who sleep during the day, for nurseries where total darkness can help babies sleep better, or for homes in urban areas with significant nighttime light pollution. Beyond light control, blackout curtains can also provide insulation, helping to regulate room temperature by reducing heat transfer, and offer noise reduction, contributing to a quiet environment.

== Manufacture ==
The process of manufacturing blackout was invented by Baltimore-based Rockland Industries, and involves coating a fabric with layers of foam, or 'passes'. A '2-pass' blackout is produced by applying two passes of foam to a fabric – first, a black layer is applied to the fabric, then a white or light-colored layer is applied on top of the black. A '3-pass' blackout is produced by applying a layer of white foam to the fabric first, then a layer of black foam, followed by the third and final layer of white or light-colored foam.

== Uses ==
A '3-pass' blackout can be used as a decorative fabric and blackout lining all in one fabric. A '2-pass' cannot be used this way, because the black foam is visible through the fabric side of the material. In addition to blocking light, blackout fabrics also insulate and have noise-dampening qualities, due to their density and opacity.

== Gallery ==
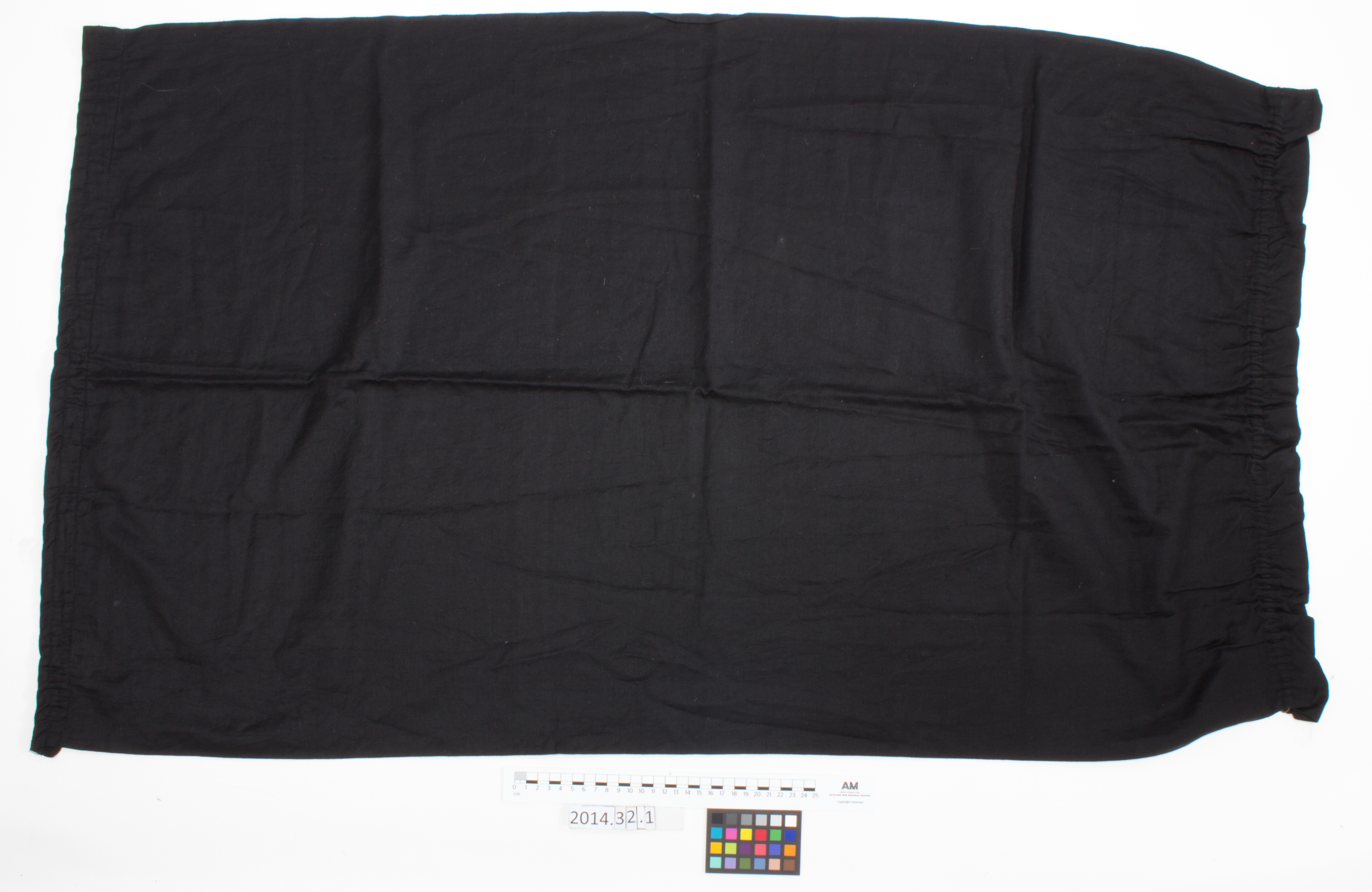

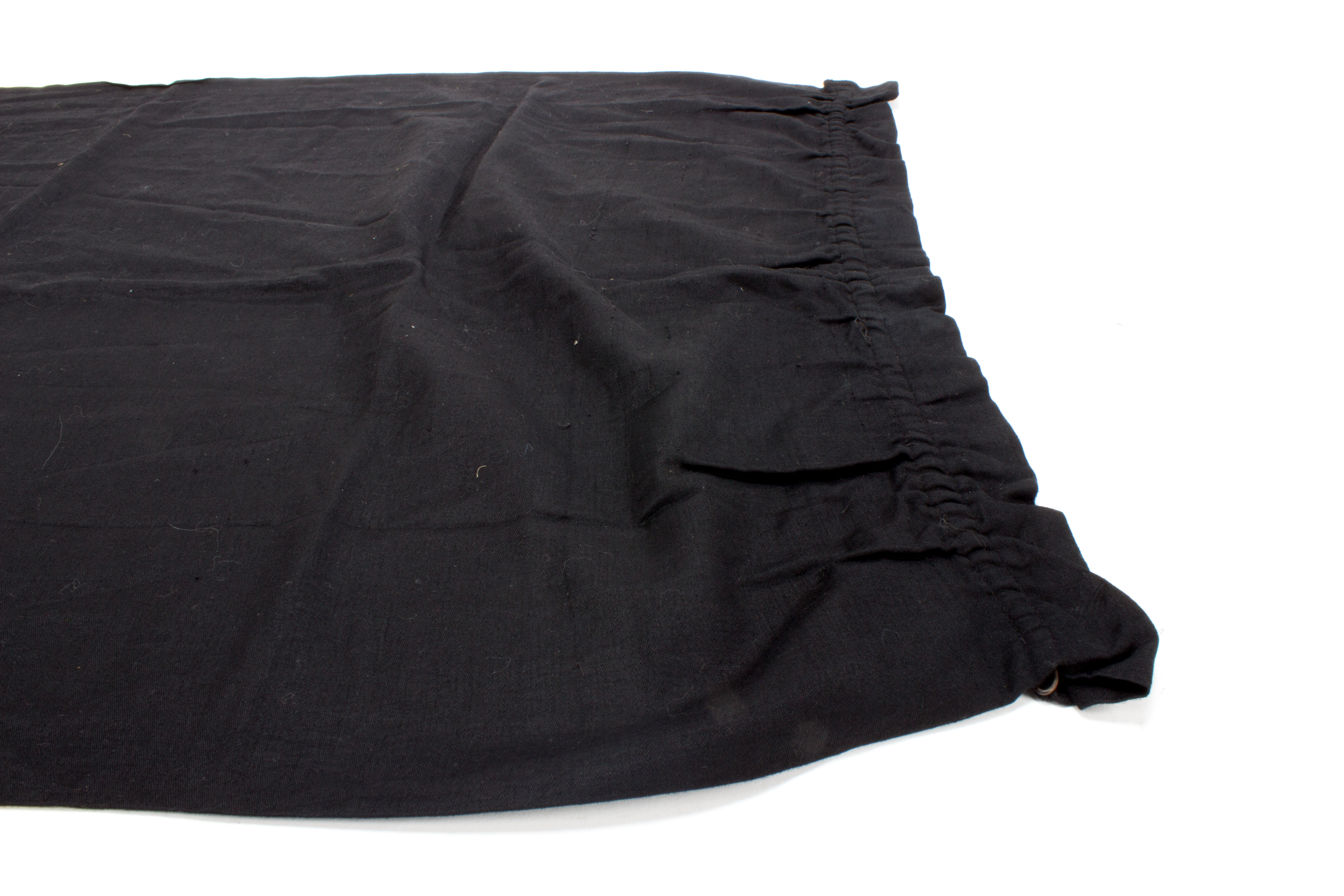

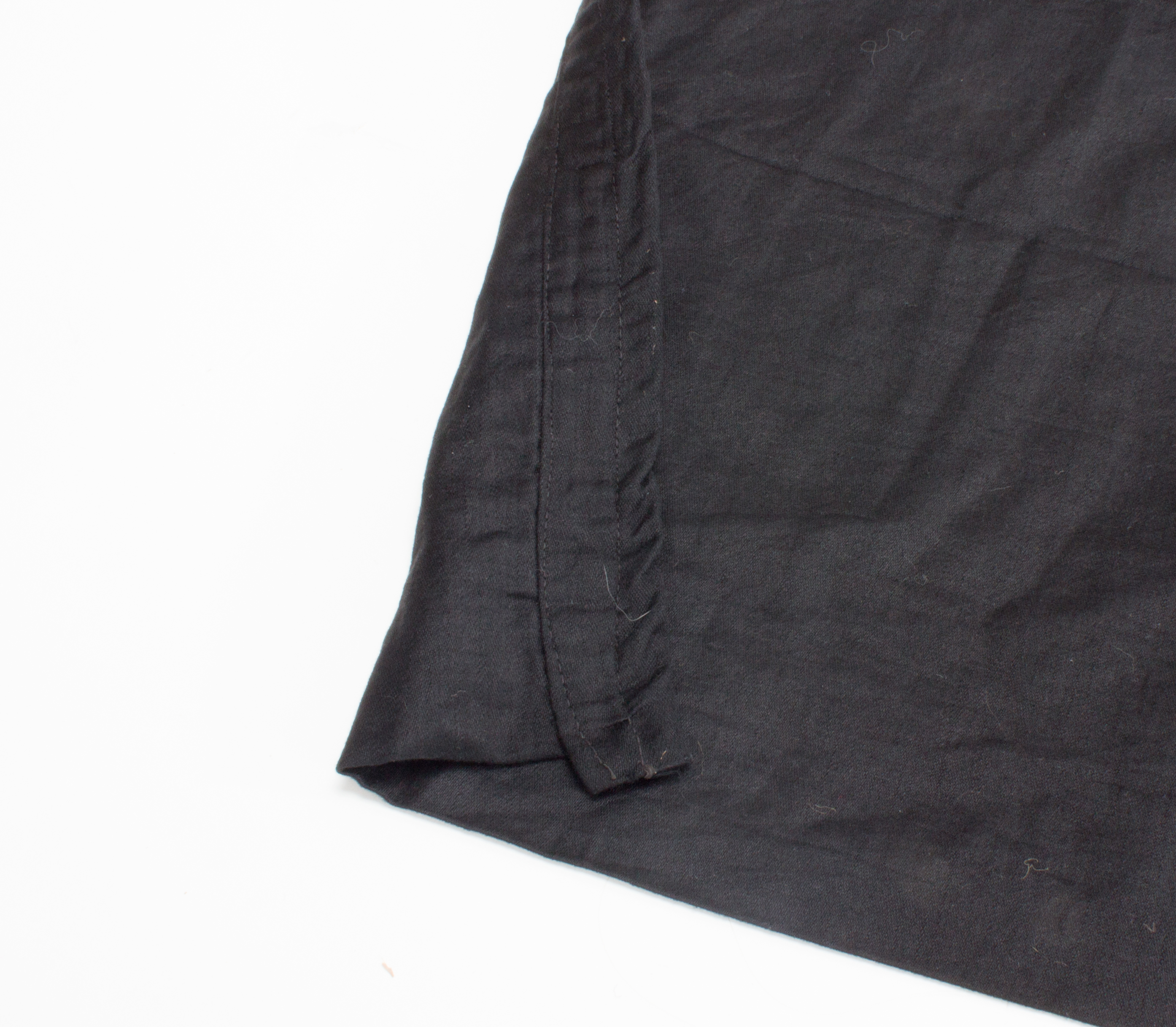

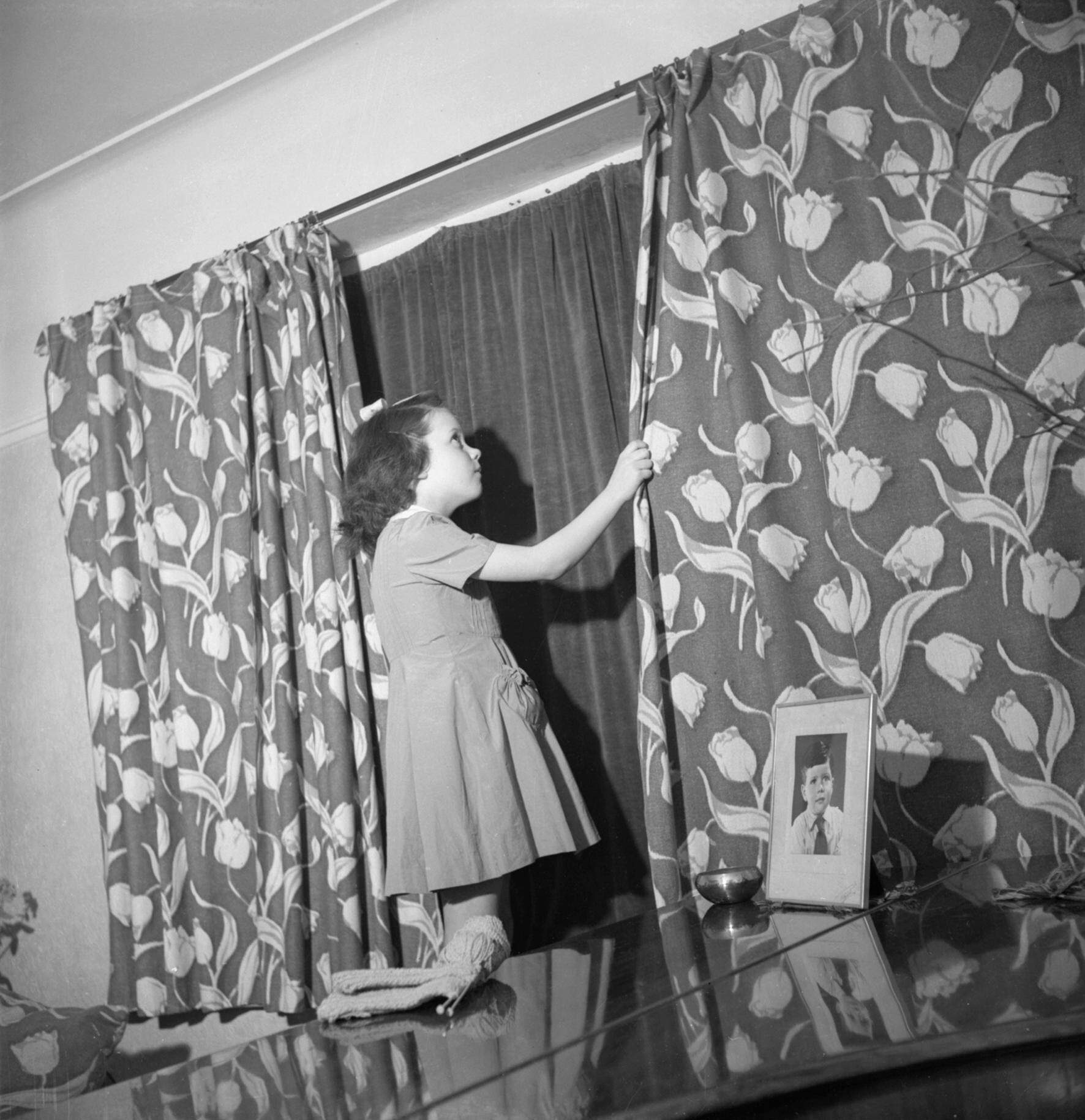

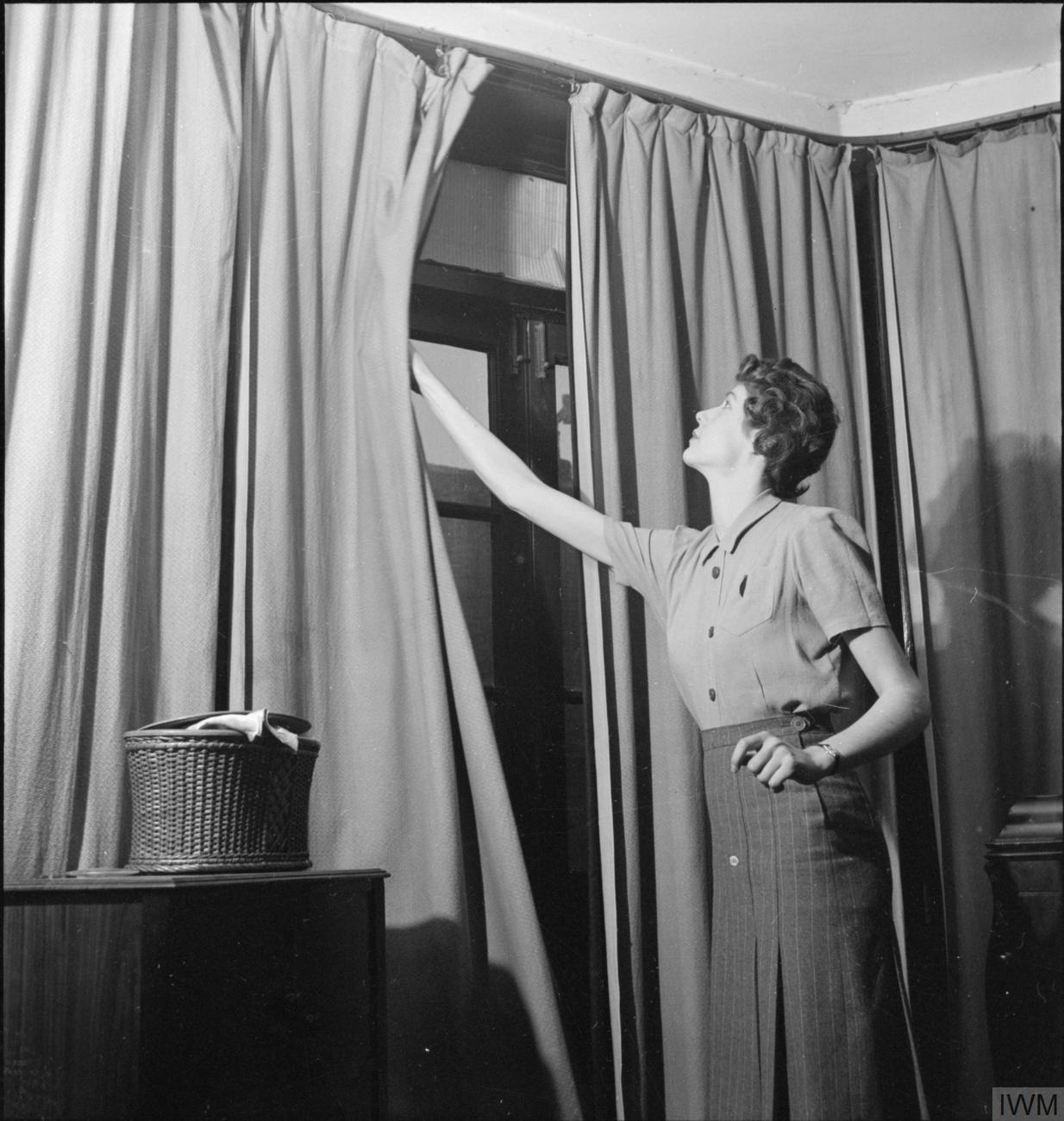
