= Westport, Baltimore =

Westport
- Neighborhood of Baltimore
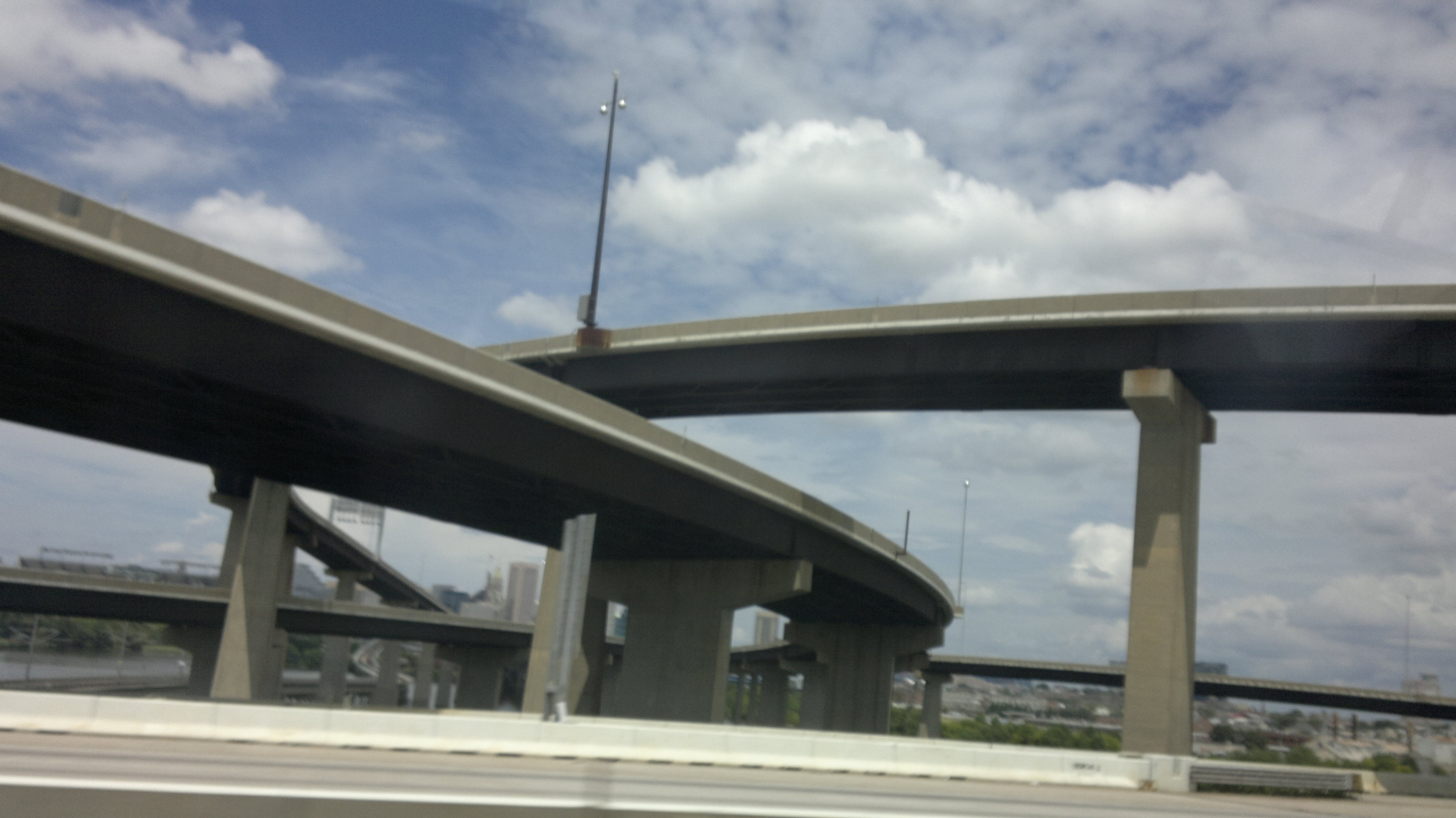
- Westport, Baltimore, MD 21230, USA

- Location within Baltimore
- Coordinates: 39°15′48.24″N 76°38′2.76″W
- Country: United States
- State: Maryland
- City: Baltimore
- Time zone: UTC-5 (Eastern)
  - Summer (DST): EDT
- ZIP code: 21230
- Area code: 410, 443, and 667

Westport is a neighborhood in south Baltimore, Maryland. Westport is a majority African-American neighborhood that has struggled with crime, housing abandonment, and unemployment in the past decade.

== Location ==
The neighborhood is bordered by the Middle Branch of the Patapsco River on the east, the city neighborhoods of Cherry Hill, Brooklyn and the southwestern Baltimore County community of Lansdowne to the southwest, Hollins Ferry Road and the Mount Winans and Lakeland neighborhoods to the west, and Interstate 95 to the north, along with the South Baltimore communities of Federal Hill and Otterbein. The Baltimore–Washington Parkway (Maryland Route 295) runs through the middle of Westport and intersects with Interstate 95, the main East Coast super-highway, north to south, Maine to Florida.

== Demographics ==
As of the census of 2000, there were 2,185 people living in the neighborhood. The racial makeup of Westport was 9.8% White, 88.8% African American, 0.2% Native American, 0.5% Asian, 0.2% from other races, and 0.7% from two or more races. Hispanic or Latino of any race were 0.9% of the population. 32.4% of occupied housing units were owner-occupied. 22.0% of housing units were vacant.

34.6% of the population were employed, 17.9% were unemployed, and 47.5% were not in the labor force. The median household income was $16,250. About 45.7% of families and 43.0% of the population were below the poverty line.

== Transportation ==
The Baltimore Light RailLink services Westport station located north of Smith Cove on the west side of the Patapsco River in Westport.

== Westport Waterfront Park ==
Construction of Westport Waterfront Park began in June 2026. This $30-million park, 10.5-acre public park will serve as a centerpiece of the One Westport development alongside the waterfront community that will include more than 500 townhomes. The waterfront park will feature statues honoring the Baltimore Black Sox, the Negro League baseball team that called the area home for more than a decade.
