= La Mott, Pennsylvania =

Unincorporated community in Pennsylvania, US

La Mott Camp Town
- Unincorporated community Neighborhood of Cheltenham Township
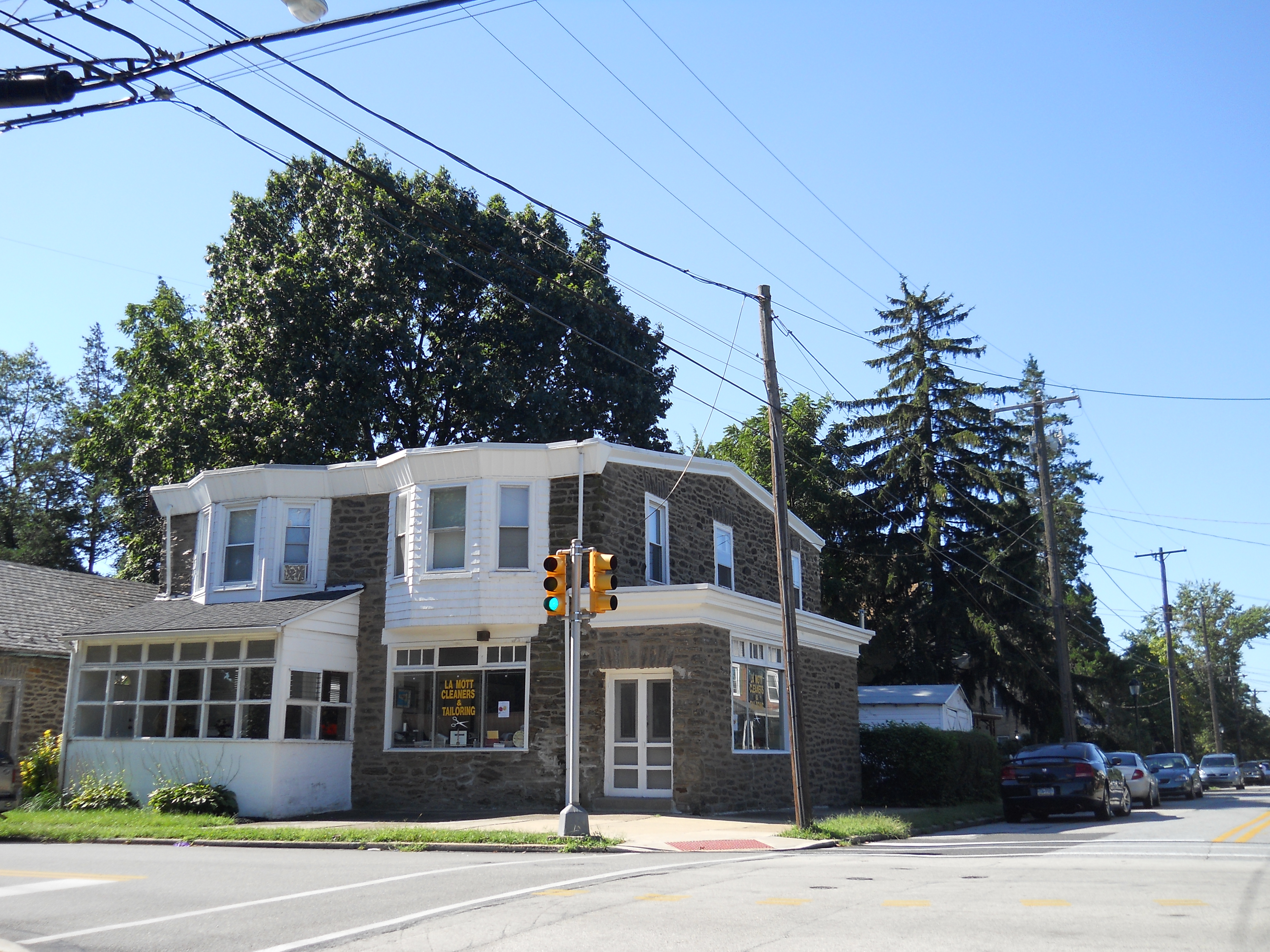
- Corner, Willow and Sycamore avenues, La Mott, Pennsylvania, 2012

- Location of La Mott in Pennsylvania La Mott (the United States)
- Coordinates: 40°04′04″N 75°08′26″W
- Country: United States
- State: Pennsylvania
- County: Montgomery
- Township: Cheltenham
- Commissioner: Harvey Portner

Area
  - Total: 0.261 sq mi (0.68 km^{2})
  - Land: 0.261 sq mi (0.68 km^{2})
  - Water: 0.00 sq mi (0 km^{2})
- Elevation: 230 ft (70 m)

Population (2010)
  - Total: 3,554
  - Density: 13,600/sq mi (5,260/km^{2})
- Time zone: UTC-5 (Eastern Standard Time)
  - Summer (DST): UTC-4 (Eastern Daylight Time)
- Area codes: 215, 267 and 445
- Website: 66.29.137.193

Pennsylvania Historical Marker
- Official name: Village of La Mott
- Designated: June 1973

La Mott is an unincorporated community located within Cheltenham Township, Pennsylvania, United States. Its name honors the leading 19th Century abolitionist and suffragist, Lucretia Mott, who resided in the neighborhood.

Of the sixty-five locations in the continental United States named Mott, this is the only community named "La Mott." It borders Philadelphia, along Cheltenham Avenue, and has been assigned the ZIP code of 19027.

== History ==
The name of this town honors Lucretia Mott, who lived here from the 1850s until her death in 1880. Her house, Roadside, which was demolished in 1911, was a major stop on the Underground Railroad.

Formerly known as Camptown (or "Camp Town"), La Mott was the site of Camp William Penn, the first federal training site for Black soldiers during the American Civil War.

== Gallery ==
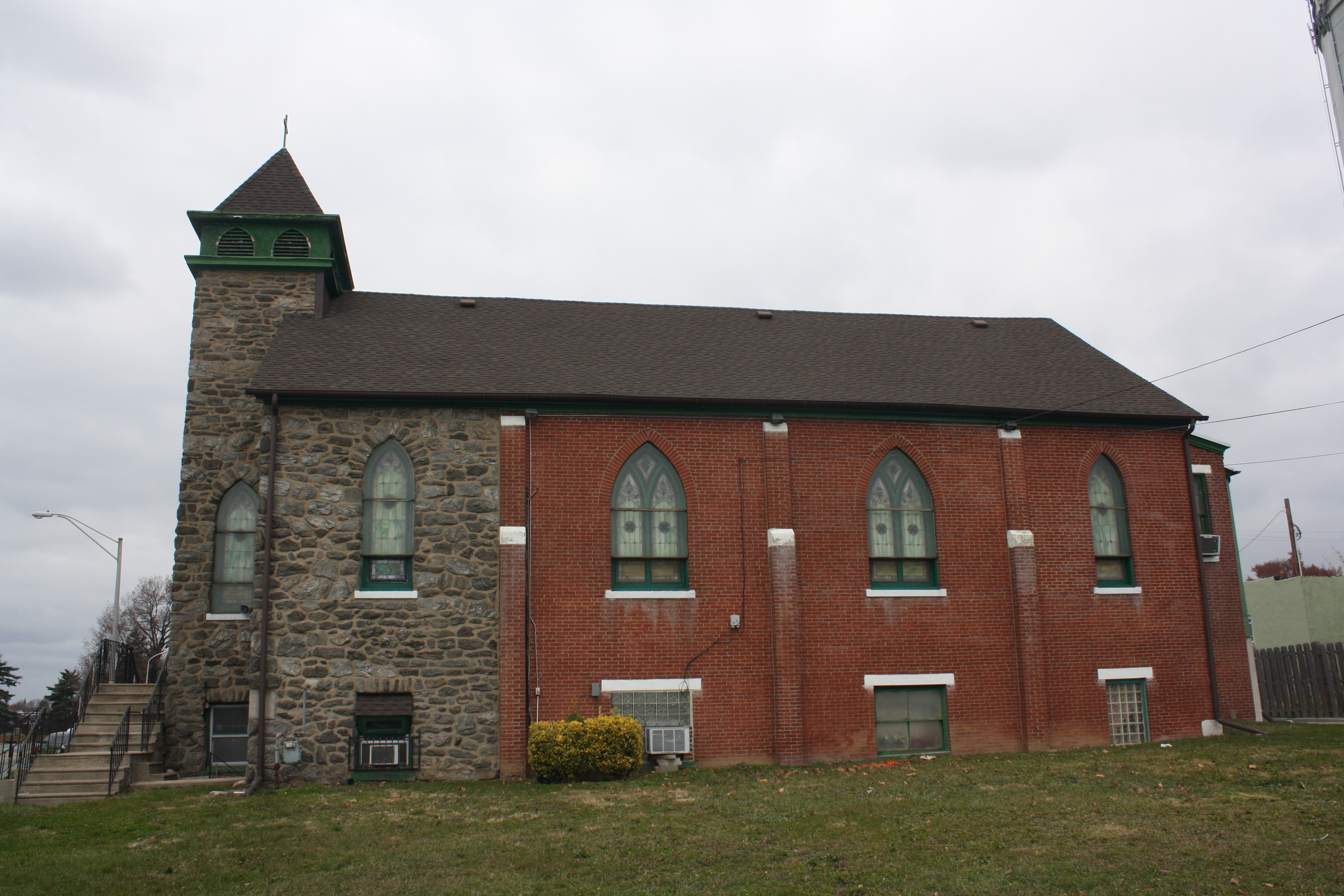
La Mott AME Church

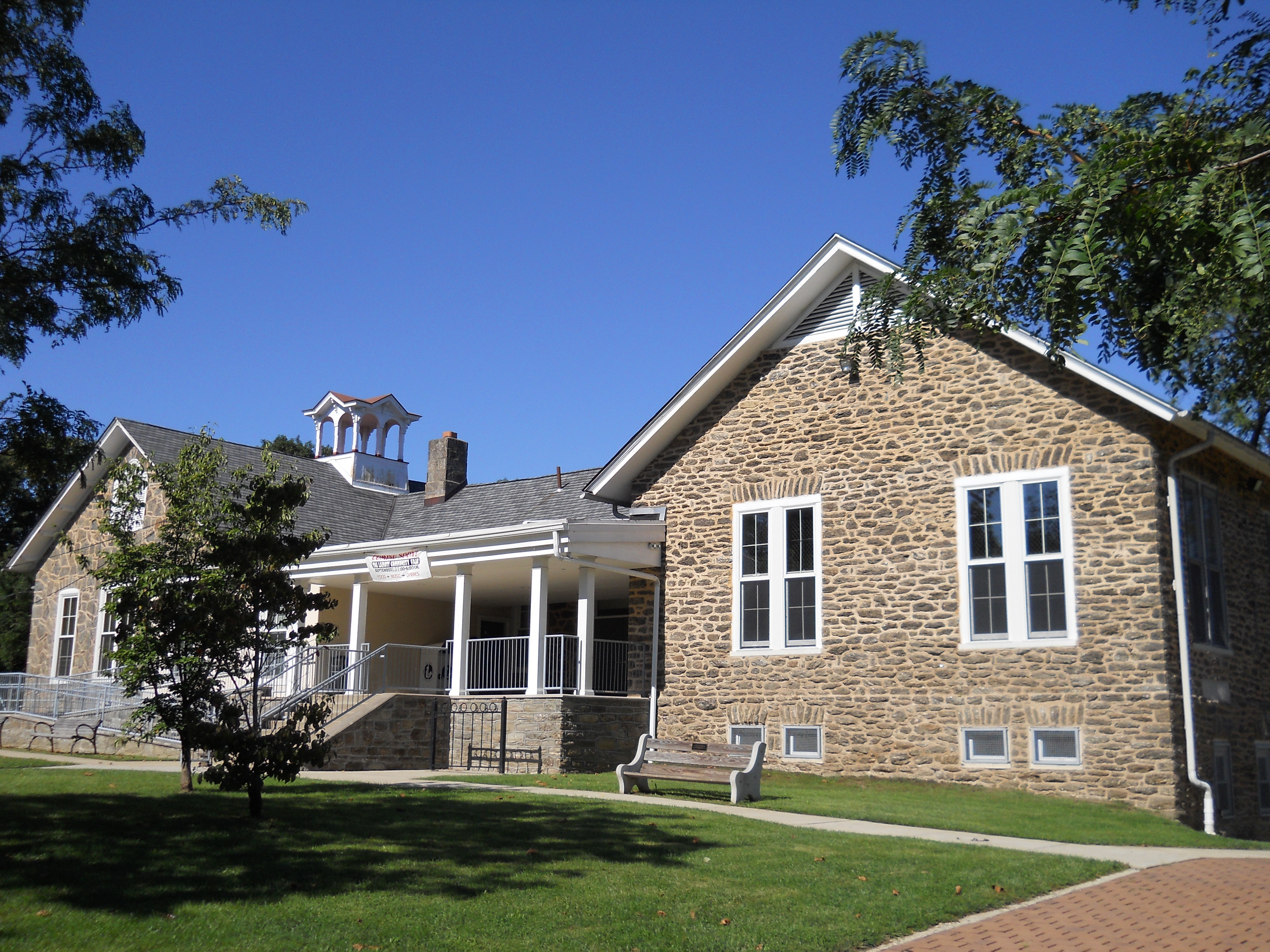
La Mott Community Center and Free Library

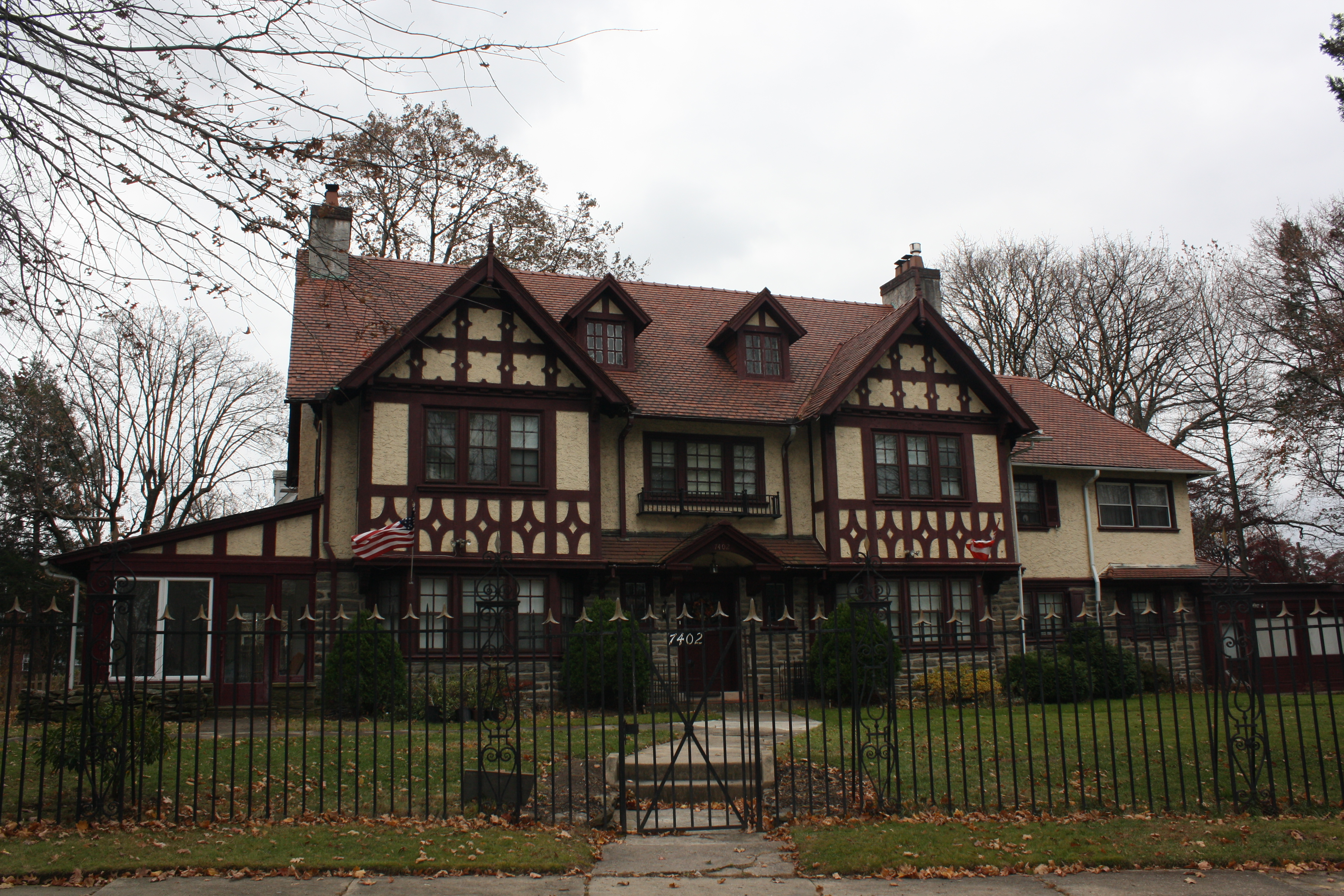
Residence, Old York Road

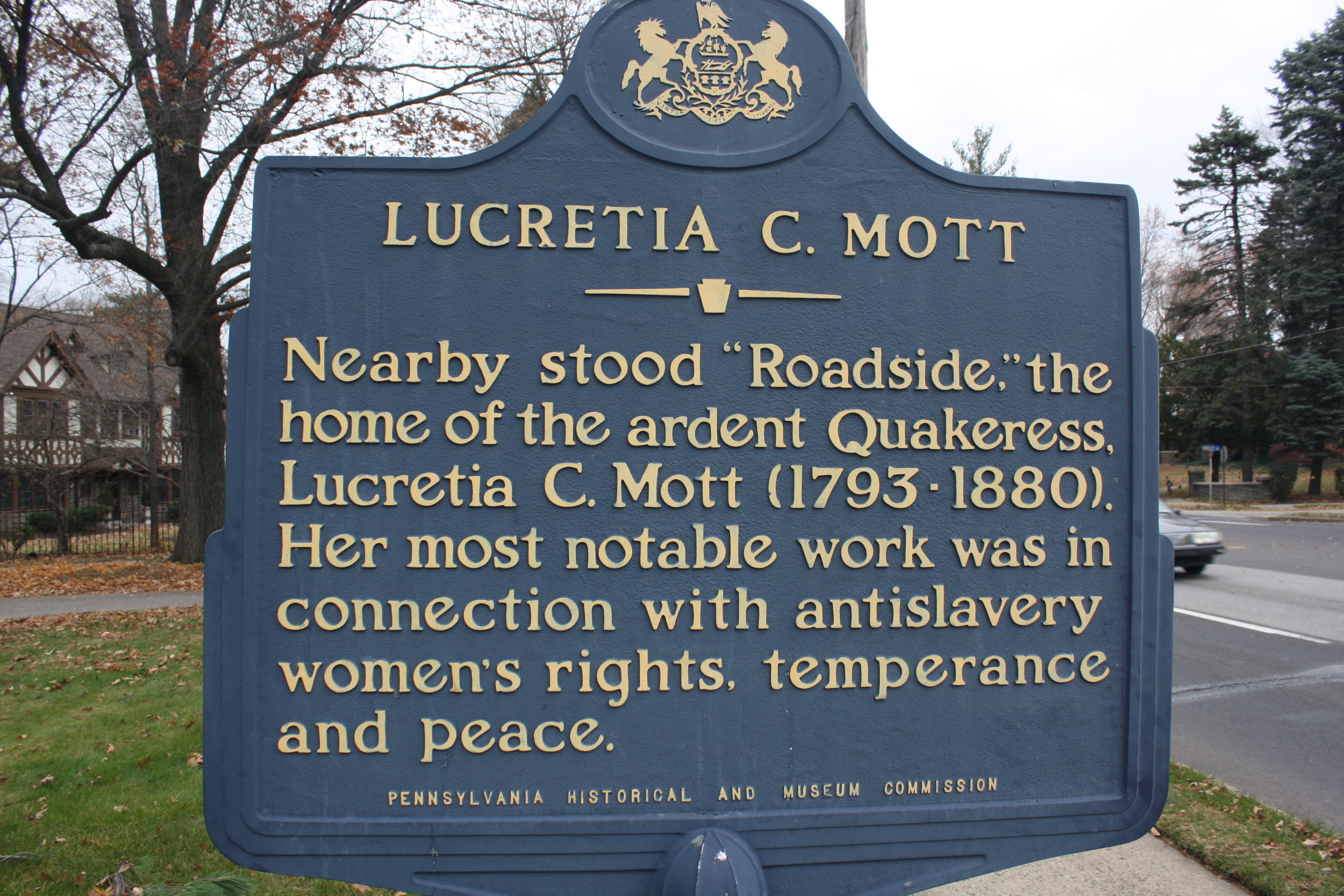
Sign at the site of former Lucretia Mott House

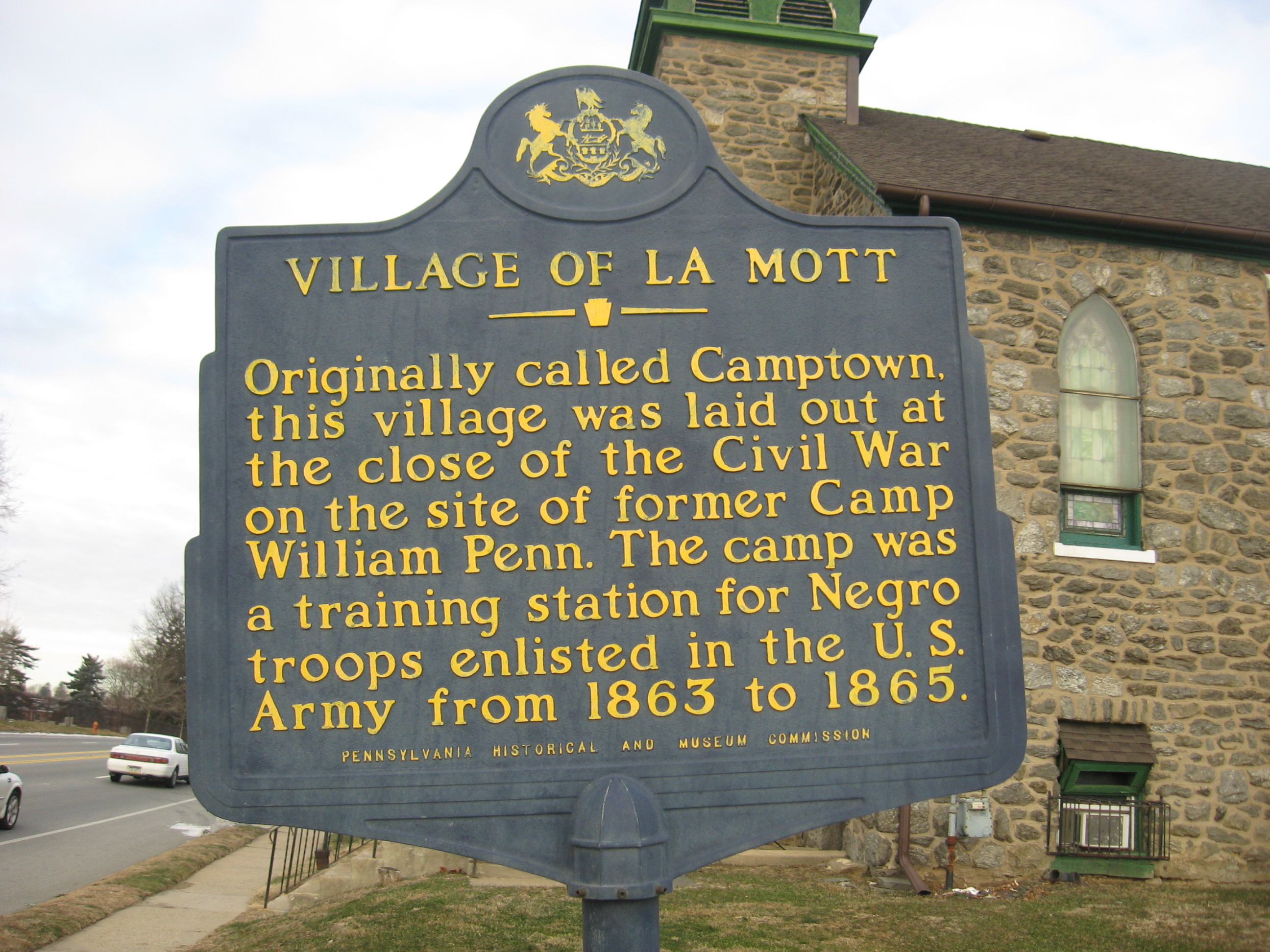
La Mott historical marker

== See also ==
- Camptown Historic District
