= Mount Winans, Baltimore =

Mount Winans
- Neighborhood of Baltimore
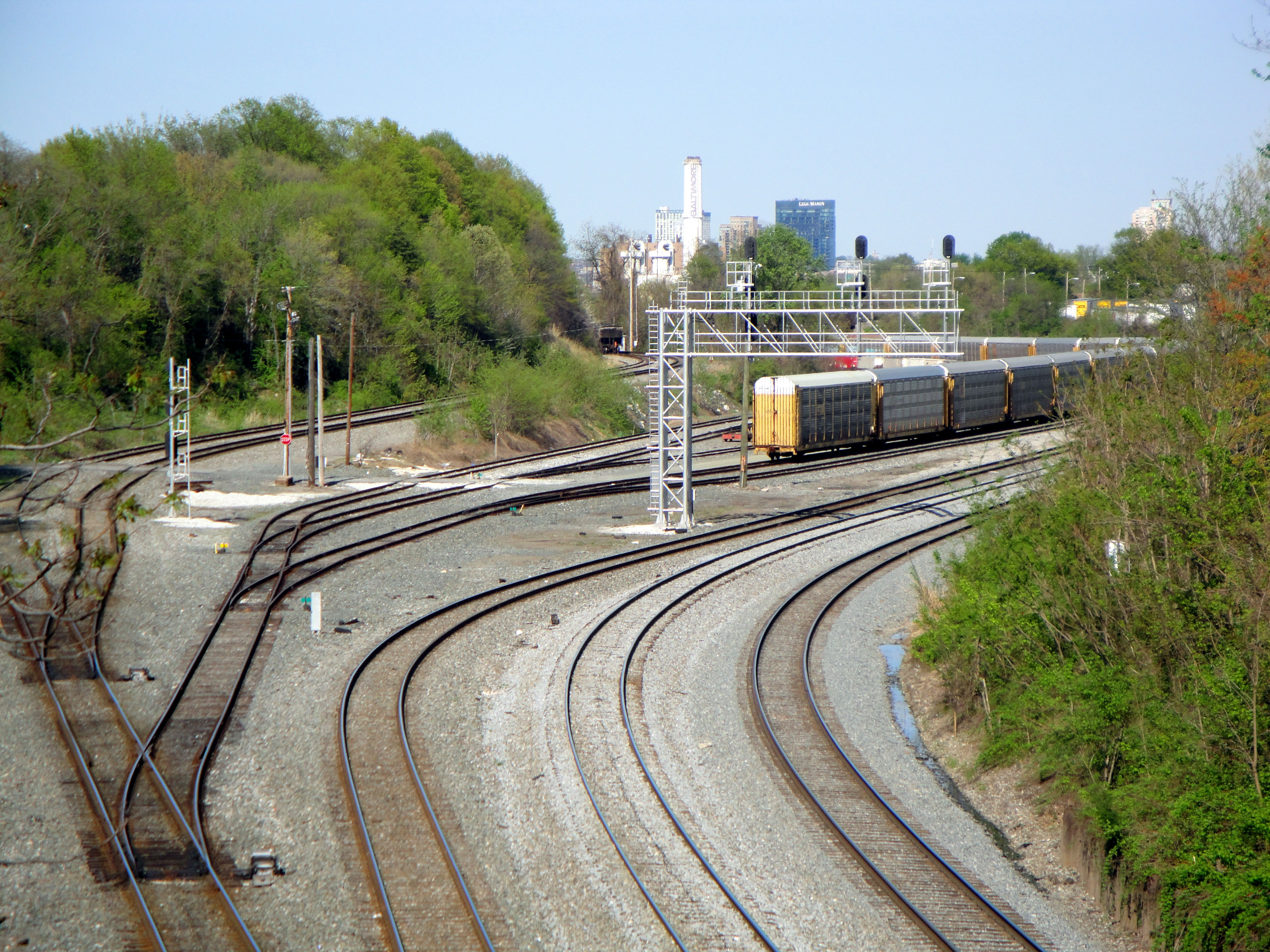
- The CSX Transportation rail yard (formerly Baltimore and Ohio Railroad) through Mount Winans

- Location within Baltimore
- Coordinates: 39°15′43″N 76°38′40″W
- Country: United States
- State: Maryland
- City: Baltimore

Area
  - Total: 0.114 sq mi (0.30 km^{2})
  - Land: 0.114 sq mi (0.30 km^{2})

Population (2008)
  - Total: 1,023
  - Density: 8,970/sq mi (3,460/km^{2})
- Time zone: UTC-5 (Eastern)
  - Summer (DST): UTC-4 (EDT)
- ZIP code: 21230
- Area code: 410, 443, and 667

"Mount Winans" ("Mt. Winans") is a mixed-use residential, commercial and industrial neighborhood in the southwestern area of the City of Baltimore in Maryland. Its north, south and east boundaries are marked by the various lines of track of the CSX Railroad (formerly the historic Baltimore and Ohio Railroad before 1987, and later briefly, the "Chessie System"). In addition, Hollins Ferry Road running to the south towards suburban Baltimore County in the southwest and further connecting with adjacent Anne Arundel County to the southeast, draws its western boundary.

The neighborhood was named after Ross Winans, (1796-1877), a famous inventor of railway steam engines for the old Baltimore and Ohio Railroad at its beginnings in 1828 and later other American lines when he later set up foundries and shops adjacent to the B. & O.'s "Mount Clare Shops" on West Pratt Street in the later named Mount Clare, Union Square and Poppleton neighborhoods of southwest Baltimore. Winans was also a major industrialist partnering with similar New York City inventor and industrialist Peter Cooper, who developed the first steam-powered locomotive for the Baltimore & Ohio, the famous "Tom Thumb" of 1830. Cooper and Winans later were involved in the southeast Baltimore industrial and port development beginning in the 1820s, further east of historic Fells Point, the earlier colonial-era and late 18th Century shipbuilding and trade district of the City. Along the northern shore of the Northwest Branch of the Patapsco River and Baltimore Harbor, the new district was titled "Canton", named for the famous southern Chinese city by the "Canton Company", founded by Capt. John O'Donnell and his descendants, a ship captain who returned in the 1780s and 90s with the first cargoes on Yankee merchant ships to Maryland from the new markets and trade in Asia.

== History ==
The Baltimore and Ohio Railroad, the oldest common carrier railroad in the United States, built its original "Main Line" from the City, first going west to Harpers Ferry, Virginia (now West Virginia), then Cumberland, Maryland, then to Wheeling, Virginia on the Ohio River and eventually reaching Illinois and the Mississippi River by three decades later. Routing through the edge of Baltimore City, across its first bridge over the Gwynns Falls stream with the stone-arched "Carrollton Viaduct", then through the area of the future southwestern Baltimore community of Mount Winans in 1828 to 1829, reaching "Relay Junction", (and splitting between its western "Main Line" and southwestern "Washington Branch" to the nation's capital at Washington, D.C.), before crossing the second major B. & O. crossing over the upper western branch of the Patapsco River with the famous stone-block, eight-arched span over the river with the "Thomas Viaduct" which still carries heavy industrial and passenger modern trains today. Additional tracks to reach the new Camden Street Station, main terminal and headquarters for the B. & O., (the largest and most magnificent depot for the new transportation technology had its center section built in 1857 and completed its eastern and western wings and three towering cupolas by the end of the American Civil War in 1865), were built through the southwestern area of future Mt. Winans in 1868. The rail lines are currently owned by CSX and operated as its Baltimore Terminal Subdivision.

The Mount Winans neighborhood began as a tiny village, alongside a myriad of railroad tracks, southwest of old "Washington Boulevard", (later U.S. Route 1), and established on the west side of Hollins Ferry Road in 1869-1870, known initially as "Hullsville". In 1871, the historic Sharp Street Methodist Church, one of the first African heritage (then-called "Colored" or "Negro") churches founded in Baltimore, then located on South Sharp Street, below and southwest of the downtown central business district in the "Sharp-Leadenhall" section of old South Baltimore, (west of "Federal Hill"), an early African-American neighborhood in the city, purchased a lot in Hullsville for its Mount Auburn Cemetery to the east along the south-bound Old Annapolis Road, near the future community to the east of Westport, developed by the 1880s along the western shore of the Middle Branch (also known as "Ferry Branch" and earlier known in colonial times by its two coves - "Ridgley's" and "Smith's"). A small chapel was built here on the lot in 1876, originally known then as the "Sharp Street Mission", later renamed the "Mount Winans United Methodist Church" (and later joining through a series of mergers, the white-oriented, largest national denomination of Methodists), known as The United Methodist Church in its Baltimore-Washington Conference).

Industrialist Ross Winans, (1796-1877), purchased a portion of the enormous stand tract of land southwest of old Baltimore Town of 2,368 acres "Mount Clare" estate, originally owned by Dr. Charles Carroll, the Barrister, (1723-1783), owner and builder in the 1750s of the historic "Mount Clare" mansion of Georgian styled architecture (in future Carroll Park) on his "Georgia" Plantation overlooking the several piers of his waterfront facing Ridgley's Cove during the colonial era of the later-known Ferry or Middle Branch of the Patapsco River in the 1860s. With his similarly wealthy and talented, inventing, and industrious son Thomas DeKay Winans, also recently returned from extensive Imperial Russian continental railroad-building projects and traveling throughout the vast transcontinental empire of Russia of the "Czars"/"Tsars" (Emperors) of the mid-19th Century, Nicholas I and Alexander II. After laying out and building streets, orchards, greenhouses, and a railroad station for passing B. & O. trains on the property, The Winans began selling lots in the new community of Mount Winans in the 1880s. Additional denominations such as the Evangelical Lutherans were recruited to establish churches, founding St. Paul's Evangelical Lutheran Church in a wooden chapel structure in 1891 on curving Hollins Ferry Road, by famous American Lutheran missionary pastor and seminary professor, the Rev. Conrad B. Gohdes of the denomination's old Joint Synod of Ohio (later through a series of mergers over a century into the modern Evangelical Lutheran Church in America and its Delaware-Maryland Synod). Many of the original wooden-frame houses and orchards on the close grid of streets in Mount Winans were unfortunately destroyed by a fire on April 3, 1905.

== Notable natives ==
- Leon Day, Negro league baseball pitcher

== See also ==
- List of Baltimore neighborhoods
