= Louis Burgee =

American baseball player

- Outfielder
- Born: December 19, 1890; Philadelphia, Pennsylvania, U.S.
- Died: January 1, 1966 (aged 75); Philadelphia, Pennsylvania, U.S.
- Threw: Right

Negro league baseball debut
- 1917, for the Hilldale Club

Last appearance
- 1921, for the Hilldale Club

Teams
- Hilldale Club (1917, 1921)

Louis D. Burgee (December 19, 1890 – January 1, 1966) was an American Negro league outfielder between 1917 and 1921.

A native of Philadelphia, Pennsylvania, Burgee made his Negro leagues debut in 1917 for the Hilldale Club, and played for Hilldale again in 1921. He died in Philadelphia in 1966 at age 75.
