= List of Negro league baseball no-hitters =

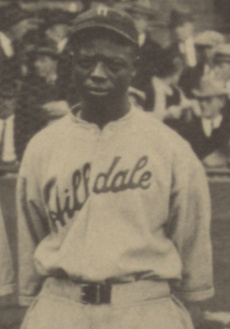
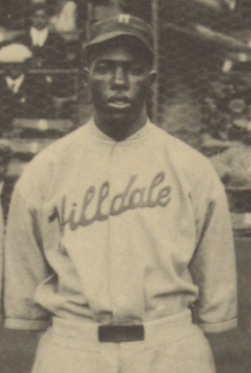
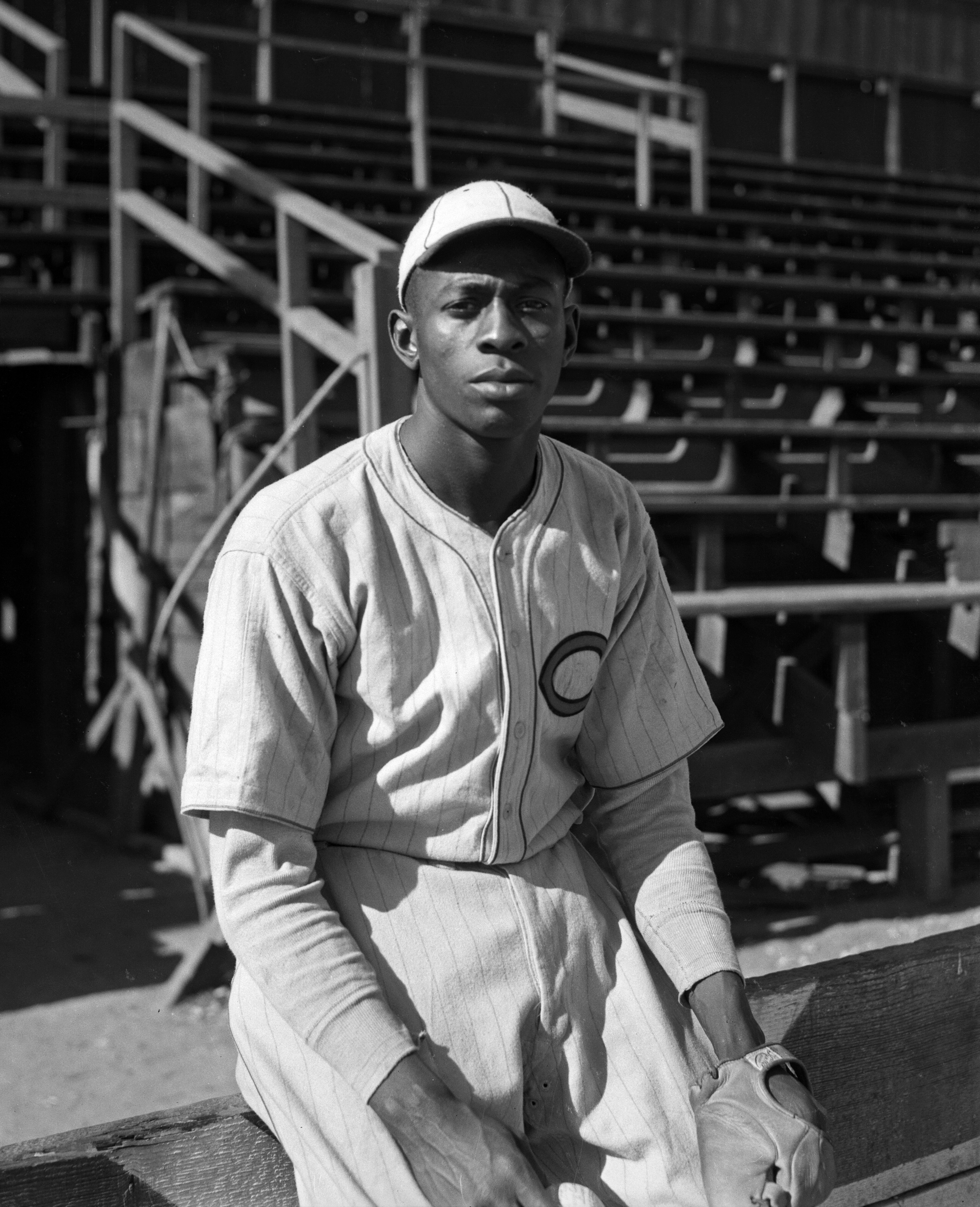
Phil Cockrell, Nip Winters, Satchel Paige (pictured; left to right) and Porter Moss are the only Negro league pitchers known to have thrown multiple no-hitters, with two each.

Due to lack of record-keeping for Negro league baseball games, the exact number of no-hitters thrown is unknown. However, ongoing research by baseball historians has revealed that at least 34 no-hitters were thrown in the Negro leagues. Researchers have had to clarify differences between play from teams and barnstorming, and one of the no-hitters was thrown at a benefit All-Star Game. There are also at least six games that were called before nine innings were completed, due to weather or darkness.

In 2020, Major League Baseball (MLB) announced the addition of seven "Negro Major Leagues" that played from 1920 to 1948 as major leagues, which recognized statistics from over 3,400 players that played in those seasons. Under MLB rules, at least 25 no-hitters from between 1920 and 1948 could be recognized and eventually be incorporated into official no-hitter records.

Of the 25 no-hitters, four pitchers threw two: Phil Cockrell, Nip Winters, Satchel Paige, and Porter Moss. Four no-hitters were combined efforts. Leon Day threw a no-hitter on May 5, 1946, to open the season for the Newark Eagles against the Philadelphia Stars, which would be considered the second no-hitter thrown by on Opening Day after Bob Feller did so on April 16, 1940, against the Chicago White Sox. Claude Grier threw a no-hitter in Game 3 of the 1926 Colored World Series against the Chicago American Giants; it was the first no-hitter thrown in a major league postseason game, 30 years before Don Larsen's perfect game in the 1956 World Series.

== Regulation no-hitters ==
Leagues
| NNL I | Negro National League I |
| ECL | Eastern Colored League |
| EWL | East–West League |
| NNL II | Negro National League II |
| NAL | Negro American League |
| Ind. | Independent |
| WS | Colored/Negro World Series |

Key
| RS | Runs scored |
| RA | Runs allowed |
| IP | Innings pitched |
| † | Elected to the Baseball Hall of Fame |
| § | Indicates game pitched in the postseason |

No-hitters
| # | Date | Pitcher | Team | RS | Opponent | RA | League | Park | Ref. |
|---|---|---|---|---|---|---|---|---|---|
| 1 | June 6, 1921 | Bill Gatewood | Detroit Stars | 4 | Cincinnati Cuban Stars | 0 | NNL I | Mack Park | |
| 2 | September 5, 1921 | Phil Cockrell (1) | Hilldale Club | 3 | Detroit Stars | 0 | Ind. | Hilldale Park | |
| 3 | June 27, 1922 | Bill Force | Detroit Stars | 3 | St. Louis Giants | 0 | NNL I | Mack Park | |
| 4 | July 26, 1922 | Nip Winters (1) | Atlantic City; Bacharach Giants | 7 | Indianapolis ABCs | 1 | NNL I | Athletic Park (Kokomo, IN) | |
| 5 | August 19, 1922 | Phil Cockrell (2) | Hilldale Club | 3 | Chicago American Giants | 0 | Ind. | Schorling Park | |
| 6 | August 19, 1922 | Doc Sykes | Baltimore Black Sox | 2 | Atlantic City; Bacharach Giants | 0 | NNL I | Maryland Park (Baltimore, MD) | |
| 7 | August 5, 1923 | José Méndez† (5 IP) Bullet Rogan† (4 IP) | Kansas City Monarchs | 7 | Milwaukee Bears | 0 | NNL I | Muehlebach Field | |
| 8 | September 3, 1924 | Nip Winters (2) | Hilldale Club | 2 | Harrisburg Giants | 0 | ECL | West End Grounds (Harrisburg, PA) | |
| 9 | July 13, 1926 | Rube Curry | Chicago American Giants | 16 | Dayton Marcos | 0 | NNL I | Schorling Park | |
| 10 | October 3, 1926§ | Claude Grier | Atlantic City; Bacharach Giants | 10 | Chicago American Giants | 0 | WS | Maryland Park (Baltimore, MD) | |
| 11 | May 15, 1927 | Laymon Yokely | Baltimore Black Sox | 8 | Cuban Stars | 0 | NNL I | Maryland Park (Baltimore, MD) | |
| 12 | August 4, 1927 | Joe Strong (11 IP) | Baltimore Black Sox | 2 | Hilldale Club | 1 | ECL | Maryland Park (Baltimore, MD) | |
| 13 | August 4, 1927 | Willie Powell | Chicago American Giants | 3 | Memphis Red Sox | 0 | NNL I | Schorling Park | |
| 14 | June 29, 1929 | Alfred Cooper (7⅓ IP) Chet Brewer (1⅔ IP) | Kansas City Monarchs | 4 | Chicago American Giants | 0 | NNL I | Schorling Park | |
| 15 | September 7, 1931 | Paul Carter | Hilldale Club | 6 | Baltimore Black Sox | 0 | Ind. | Hilldale Park | |
| 16 | July 8, 1932 | Satchel Paige† (1) | Pittsburgh Crawfords | 6 | New York Black Yankees | 0 | Ind. | Greenlee Field | |
| 17 | July 4, 1934 | Satchel Paige† (2) | Pittsburgh Crawfords | 4 | Homestead Grays | 0 | NNL II | Greenlee Field | |
| 18 | June 9, 1936 | Neck Stanley | New York Cubans | 12 | Newark Eagles | 1 | NNL II | Delano-Hitch; Recreational Park | |
| 19 | May 16, 1937 | Hilton Smith† | Kansas City Monarchs | 4 | Chicago American Giants | 0 | NAL | Muehlebach Field | |
| 20 | June 27, 1941 | Gene Smith | St. Louis–New Orleans Stars | 6 | New York Black Yankees | 1 | NAL | Belleville Athletic Field (Belleville, IL) | |
| 21 | August 28, 1941 | Johnny Wright (6 IP) Terris McDuffie (2 IP) J. C. Hamilton (1 IP) | Homestead Grays | 19 | New York Cubans | 0 | NNL II | Idora Park | |
| 22 | September 27, 1943 | Porter Moss (1) | Memphis Red Sox | 5 | Cincinnati Clowns | 0 | NAL | Russwood Park | |
| 23 | October 10, 1943 | Porter Moss (2) | Memphis Red Sox | 6 | New York Black Yankees | 0 | NAL | Martin Park (Memphis, TN) | |
| 24 | May 5, 1946 | Leon Day† | Newark Eagles | 2 | Philadelphia Stars | 0 | NNL II | Ruppert Stadium | |
| 25 | May 25, 1948 | Albert Stephens (5 IP) Neck Stanley (4 IP) | New York Black Yankees | 4 | Newark Eagles | 1 | NNL II | Red Wing Stadium | |

== See also ==
- Lists of no-hitters
- List of Major League Baseball no-hitters
