= Bobby Robinson (baseball) =

American baseball player (1903 – 2002)

- Third baseman / Shortstop / Left fielder
- Born: October 25, 1903; Whistler, Alabama, U.S.
- Died: May 17, 2002 (aged 98); Chicago, Illinois, U.S.
- Batted: Right Threw: Right

Negro league baseball debut
- 1925, for the Indianapolis ABCs

Last appearance
- 1940, for the St. Louis–New Orleans Stars

Teams
- Indianapolis ABCs (1925–1926); Birmingham Black Barons (1927); Memphis Red Sox (1927–1928); Detroit Stars (1929–1931); Cleveland Stars (1932); Cleveland Red Sox (1934); Nashville Elite Giants (1934); Bacharach Giants (1936); Indianapolis ABCs/St. Louis Stars/St. Louis–New Orleans Stars (1938-1940)

William L. "Bobby" Robinson (October 25, 1903 – May 17, 2002) was an American professional baseball third baseman, shortstop and left fielder in the Negro leagues from 1925–1940. He was known as the "Human Vacuum Cleaner" because of his fielding ability.

Robinson started with the semi-pro Mobile Tigers with fellow Negro league players Satchel Paige and Ted Radcliffe. He moved on to the Pensacola Giants where he was discovered by the Indianapolis ABC's in 1925. He went on to play for the Birmingham Black Barons, the Chicago American Giants, the Memphis Red Sox, and the Detroit Stars over the next eight years.

Robinson retired from baseball in 1942. He died on May 17, 2002, in Chicago, Illinois.
