= Satchel Paige =

American baseball player and coach (1906–1982)

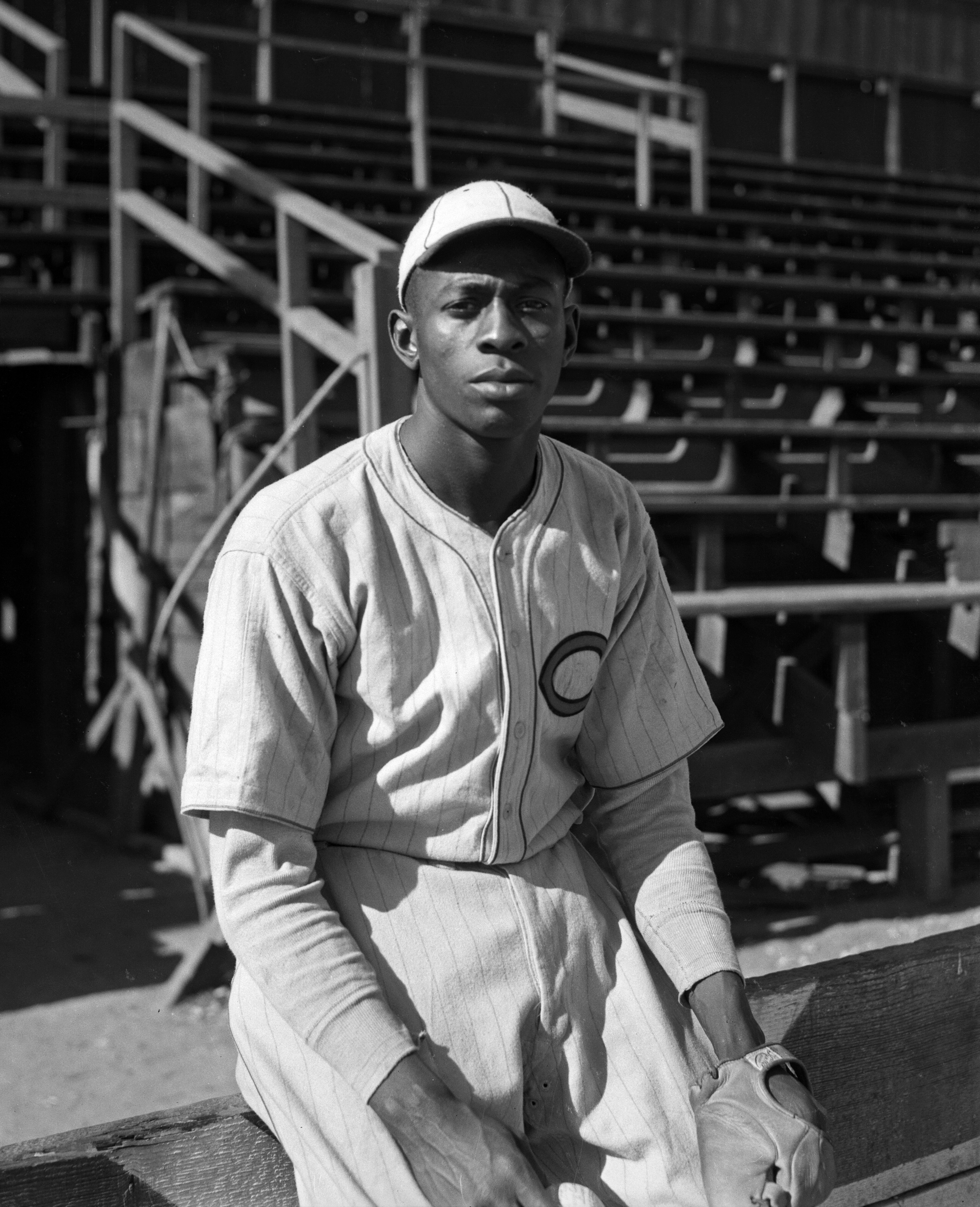
- Paige, c. 1933
- Pitcher
- Born: July 7, 1906; Mobile, Alabama, U.S.
- Died: June 8, 1982 (aged 75); Kansas City, Missouri, U.S.
- Batted: Right Threw: Right

Professional debut
- NgL: 1927, for the Birmingham Black Barons
- AL: July 9, 1948, for the Cleveland Indians

Last MLB appearance
- September 25, 1965, for the Kansas City Athletics

MLB statistics
- Win–loss record: 124–82
- Earned run average: 2.73
- Strikeouts: 1,501
- Stats at Baseball Reference

Teams
- Birmingham Black Barons (1927–1930); Cleveland Cubs (1931); Pittsburgh Crawfords (1933–1934, 1936); Kansas City Monarchs (1940–1941); New York Black Yankees (1941); Kansas City Monarchs (1942); Memphis Red Sox (1943); Kansas City Monarchs (1944–1947); Cleveland Indians (1948–1949); St. Louis Browns (1951–1953); Kansas City Athletics (1965)

Career highlights and awards
- 2× MLB All-Star (1952, 1953); 6× Negro league All-Star (1933–1934, 1936, 1941–1943); World Series champion (1948); Negro World Series champion (1942); Cleveland Indians Hall of Fame; Oldest Major League Baseball player in history

Member of the National

Baseball Hall of Fame
- Induction: 1971
- Election method: Negro Leagues Committee

Leroy Robert "Satchel" Paige (July 7, 1906 – June 8, 1982) was an American professional baseball pitcher who played in Negro league baseball and Major League Baseball (MLB). His career spanned five decades and culminated with his induction into the National Baseball Hall of Fame.

A right-handed pitcher, Paige first played for the semi-professional Mobile Tigers from 1924 to 1926. He began his professional baseball career in 1926 with the Chattanooga Black Lookouts of the Negro Southern League and became one of the most famous and successful players from the Negro leagues. On town tours across the United States, Paige would sometimes have his infielders sit down behind him and then routinely strike out the side.

At age 42 in 1948, Paige made his MLB debut for the Cleveland Indians, making him the oldest debutant in the history of professional baseball (or any professional sport). Additionally, Paige was 59 years old when he played his last major league game, which is also a record in any professional sport. Paige was the first black pitcher to play in the American League and was the seventh black player to play in Major League Baseball. In 1948, Paige became the first player who had played in the Negro leagues to pitch in the World Series; the Indians won the Series that year. He played with the St. Louis Browns from 1951 to 1953, representing the team in the All-Star Game in 1952 and 1953. He played his last professional game on June 21, 1966, for the Peninsula Grays of the Carolina League, two weeks shy of 60. In 1971, Paige became the first electee of the Negro League Committee to be inducted into the Baseball Hall of Fame; he holds the record with Hoyt Wilhelm and Goose Gossage for the most Major League franchises played for (9) by a Hall-of-Fame pitcher.

== Date of birth ==
While Satchel Paige was playing baseball, many ages and birthdates were reported, ranging from 1899 to 1908. Paige himself was the source of many of these dates. His actual birthdate, July 7, 1906, was determined in 1948 when Cleveland Indians owner Bill Veeck traveled to Mobile, Alabama, and accompanied Paige's family to the County Health Department to obtain his birth certificate. Paige's birth certificate is displayed in his autobiography.

In 1959, Paige's mother told a reporter that he was 55 rather than 53, saying she knew this because she wrote it down in her Bible. Paige wrote in his autobiography, "Seems like Mom's Bible would know, but she ain't ever shown me the Bible. Anyway, she was in her nineties when she told the reporter that, and sometimes she tended to forget things."

== Early life ==
Paige was born Leroy Robert Page to John Page, a gardener, and Lula Page (née Coleman), a domestic worker, in a section of Mobile, Alabama, known as Down the Bay. Lula and her children changed the spelling of their name from Page to Paige in the mid-1920s, just before the start of Satchel's baseball career. Lula said, "Page looked too much like a page in a book," whereas Paige explained, "My folks started out by spelling their name 'Page' and later stuck in the 'i' to make themselves sound more high-tone." The introduction of the new spelling coincided with the death of Paige's father, and may have suggested a desire for a new start.

According to Paige, his nickname originated from childhood work toting bags at the train station. He said he was not making enough money at a dime a bag, so he used a pole and rope to build a contraption that allowed him to cart up to four bags at once. Another kid supposedly yelled, "You look like a walking satchel tree." A different story was told by boyhood friend and neighbor Wilber Hines, who said he gave Paige the nickname after he was caught trying to steal a bag. At the age of 10, Paige was playing "top ball," which was what got him into baseball. "Top ball" was a kids' game that used sticks and bottle caps instead of baseballs and bats to play a variation of the diamond sport. Satchel's mother, Lula, would even comment on how Paige would rather "play baseball than eat. It was always baseball, baseball."

On July 24, 1918, just seventeen days after his 12th birthday, Paige was sentenced to six years—or until his 18th birthday, whichever came first—at the Alabama Reform School for Juvenile Negro Law-Breakers in Mount Meigs, Alabama, owing to his truancy in school along with his tendency to steal.

The person who taught Paige to pitch while in reform school was the Reverend Moses Davis. It was Davis, who was also a trustee of the school, who devoted the long hours coaching the boys in baseball, and it was he who struck the deal with the sporting-goods store in Montgomery to secure the team's first uniforms. Davis was African American, as was the entire teaching staff at Mount Meigs, including the school's founder, Cornelia Bowen, a graduate of Tuskegee Institute. Paige was released from the institution in December 1923, seven months short of his 18th birthday. He summed up his years of incarceration: "I traded five years of freedom to learn how to pitch. At least I started my real learning on the Mount. They were not wasted years at all. It made a real man out of me."

After his release, Paige played for several Mobile semi-pro teams. He joined the semi-pro Mobile Tigers, for which his brother Wilson was already pitching. He also pitched for a semi-pro team named the "Down the Bay Boys," and he recalled an incident in the ninth inning of a 1–0 ballgame when his teammates made three consecutive errors, loading the bases for the other team with two outs. Angry, Paige said he stomped around the mound, kicking up dirt. The fans started booing him, so he decided that "somebody was going to have to be showed up for that." He called in his outfielders and had them sit down in the infield. With the fans and his own teammates howling, Paige struck out the final batter, winning the game.

== Negro leagues ==
=== Chattanooga and Birmingham: 1926–1929 ===
A former friend from Mobile, Alex Herman, was the player/manager for the Chattanooga White Sox of the minor Negro Southern League. In 1926 he discovered Paige and offered to pay him $250 per month, of which Paige would collect $50 with the rest going to his mother. He also agreed to pay Lula Paige a $200 advance, and she agreed to the contract.

The local newspapers—the Chattanooga News and Chattanooga Times—recognized from the beginning that Paige was special. In April 1926, shortly after his arrival, he recorded nine strikeouts over six innings against the Atlanta Black Crackers. Partway through the 1927 season, Paige's contract was sold to the Birmingham Black Barons of the major Negro National League (NNL). According to Paige's first memoir, his contract was for $450 per month, but in his second he said it was for $275.

Pitching for the Black Barons, Paige threw hard but was wild and awkward. In his first big game in late June 1927, against the St. Louis Stars, Paige incited a brawl when his fastball hit the hand of St. Louis catcher Mitchell Murray. Murray then charged the mound and Paige raced for the dugout, but Murray flung his bat and struck Paige above the hip. The police were summoned, and the headline of the Birmingham Reporter proclaimed a "Near Riot." Paige improved and matured as a pitcher with help from two teammates, Sam Streeter and Harry Salmon, and his manager, Bill Gatewood. He finished the 1927 season 7–1 with 69 strikeouts and 26 walks in 89 1/3 innings.

Over the next two seasons, Paige went 12–5 and 10–9 while recording 176 strikeouts in 1929. (Several sources credit his 1929 strikeout total as the all-time single-season record for the Negro leagues, though there is variation among the sources about the exact number of strikeouts.) On April 29 of that season he recorded 17 strikeouts in a game against the Cuban Stars, which exceeded what was then the major league record of 16 held by Noodles Hahn and Rube Waddell. Six days later he struck out 18 Nashville Elite Giants, a number that was tied in the white majors by Bob Feller in 1938. Due to his increased earning potential, Barons owner R. T. Jackson would "rent" Paige out to other ball clubs for a game or two to draw a decent crowd, with both Jackson and Paige taking a cut.

=== Cuba, Baltimore, and Cleveland: 1929–1931 ===
Abel Linares offered Paige $100 per game to play winter ball for the Santa Clara team in the Cuban League. Gambling on baseball games in Cuba was such a huge pastime that players were not allowed to drink alcohol, so they could stay ready to play. Paige—homesick for carousing, hating the food, despising the constant inspections and being thoroughly baffled by the language—went 6–5 in Cuba. He left Cuba abruptly before the end of the season, with several stories told about the circumstances. Paige told one version in which the mayor of a small hamlet asked him, in Spanish, if he had intentionally lost a particular game. Paige, not understanding a word the man said, nodded and smiled, thinking the man was fawning over him, and then had to flee from the furious mayor. Another version, also told by Paige, says that when he called on an attractive local girl at her home, she and her family interpreted his attentions as an official engagement and sent the police to enforce it, leading Paige to flee the island with police in pursuit. A third version, told by the general manager of the Santa Clara Leopards, says that he left Cuba in haste after legal charges were brought against him regarding an amorous incident with "a young lady from the provincial mulatto bourgeoisie."

When Paige returned to the United States, he and Jackson revived their practice of renting him out to various teams. In the spring of 1930, Jackson leased him to the Baltimore Black Sox, who had won the 1929 American Negro League championship led by their bowlegged third baseman Jud "Boojum" Wilson. Paige, as a Southerner, found that he was an outsider on the Black Sox, and his teammates considered him a hick. Moreover, he was the team's number two pitcher behind Laymon Yokely, and Paige did not like being overshadowed.

In midsummer Paige returned to Birmingham, where he pitched well the rest of the summer, going 7–4. In September he was leased to the Chicago American Giants of the NNL for a home-and-home series with the Houston Black Buffaloes of the Texas–Oklahoma League. Paige won one and lost one in the series and then returned to Birmingham.

By the spring of 1931, the Depression was taking its toll on the Negro leagues, and the Black Barons had temporarily disbanded. Few teams could afford Paige, but Tom Wilson, who was moving the Nashville Elite Giants to Cleveland as the Cleveland Cubs, thought he could. Playing in the same city as a white major league team, Paige recalled, "I'd look over at the Cleveland Indians' stadium, called League Park... All season long it burned me, playing there in the shadow of that stadium. "It didn't hurt my pitching, but it sure didn't do me any good."

=== Pittsburgh, California, and North Dakota: 1931–1936 ===
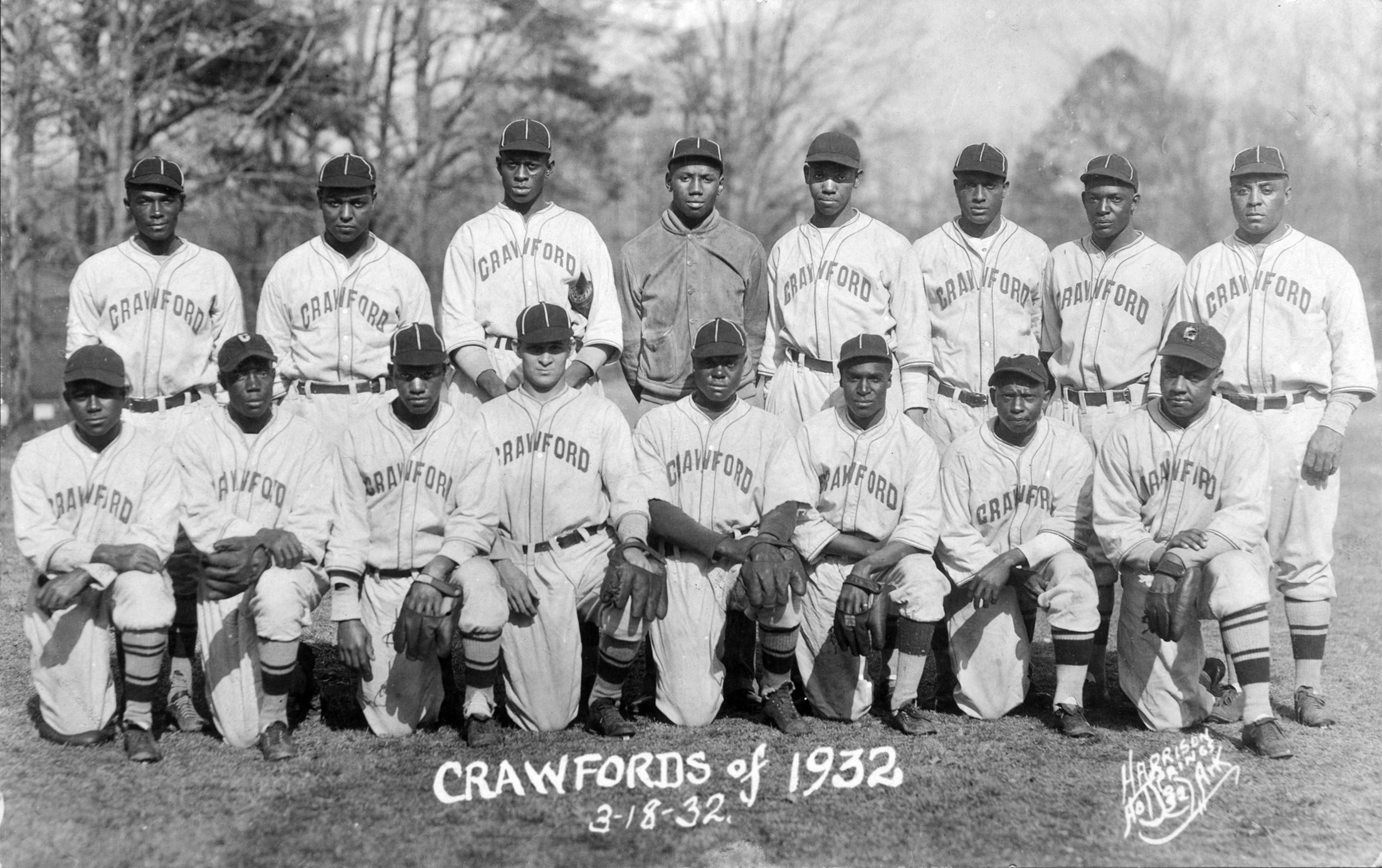
Paige (standing, 3rd from left) with the 1932 Pittsburgh Crawfords

In June 1931, the Crawford Colored Giants, an independent club owned by Pittsburgh underworld figure Gus Greenlee, made Paige an offer of $250 a month. On August 6, Paige made his Crawford debut against their hometown rivals, the Homestead Grays. Entering the game in the fourth inning, Paige held the Grays scoreless and had six strikeouts and no walks in five innings of relief work to get the win.

In September, Paige joined a Negro all-star team organized by Tom Wilson, called the Philadelphia Giants, to play in the California Winter League. This was the first of nine winters that he played in a league that provided ongoing competition between elite black and white baseball players, including major and minor league players. On October 24 Paige won his first California game 8–1, allowing five hits and striking out 11, including Babe Herman four times. He finished the winter with a 6–0 record and 70 strikeouts in 58 innings.

In 1932, Greenlee signed Josh Gibson, Oscar Charleston and Ted "Double Duty" Radcliffe away from Cumberland Posey's Homestead Grays to assemble one of the finest baseball clubs in history. Paige took the mound when the Crawfords opened the season on April 30 in their newly built stadium, Greenlee Field, the first completely black-owned stadium in the country. Paige lost the opener to the New York Black Yankees in a pitching duel with Jesse "Mountain" Hubbard, but he got even with them by beating them twice that season, including Paige's first Negro league no-hitter in July. Paige went 10–4, allowing 3.19 runs per game and striking out 92 in 132 2/3 innings.

In the midst of the Depression, Cum Posey's new East–West League had collapsed by mid-season, and Greenlee was able to obtain many of the best players in black baseball. By the end of the season, Greenlee had signed to contracts Cool Papa Bell, John Henry Russell, Leroy Matlock, Jake Stephens, "Boojum" Wilson, Jimmie Crutchfield, Ted Page, Judy Johnson, and Rap Dixon. With the Crawfords playing five future Hall of Famers, many Negro league historians regard the 1930s Crawfords as the greatest team in Negro league history.

The next season, Greenlee organized a new Negro National League, which survived for 16 years. Despite Greenlee's efforts to control his biggest star, Paige followed his own schedule and was often late to games that he was scheduled to pitch. In August, he jumped the Crawfords, accepting an offer from Neil Churchill's North Dakota semi-pro team, the Bismarcks (sometimes known as the "Bismarck Churchills" today), of $400 and a late model car for just one month's work. It was Paige's first experience playing with an integrated team in the United States. He helped Bismarck beat their local rivals in Jamestown, who were also featuring a Negro league ace pitcher, Barney Brown. Paige was unapologetic when he returned to Pittsburgh in September to help the Crawfords win the second-half championship. Paige was snubbed by other Negro league players and fans when he was not selected for the first ever East–West All-Star Game.

The 1934 season was perhaps the best of Paige's career, as he went 14–2 in league games while allowing 2.16 runs per game, recording 144 strikeouts, and giving up only 26 walks. On July 4, Paige threw his second no-hitter, this time against the Homestead Grays. He struck out 17, and only a first-inning walk to future Hall of Famer Buck Leonard and an error in the fourth inning prevented it from being a perfect game. Leonard, unnerved by the rising swoop of the ball, repeatedly asked the umpire to check the ball for scuffing. When the umpire removed one ball from play, Paige hollered, "You may as well thrown 'em all out 'cause they're all gonna jump like that."

The Denver Post conducted an annual baseball tournament (sometimes known as the "Little World Series") that attracted semi-pro and independent professional teams from across the country. In 1934 it was open, for the first time, to black players. Greenlee leased Paige to the Colored House of David, a prominent barnstorming team of white men who represented a religious commune and wore beards. Their manager was Hall of Fame pitcher Grover Cleveland Alexander. Paige pitched shutouts in his first two starts, striking out 14 and 18. The final, championship game was his third start in five days and he faced the Kansas City Monarchs—at the time an independent, barnstorming team—who were participating in the tournament with a lineup augmented by Negro league stars Turkey Stearnes and Sam Bankhead. Paige faced Chet Brewer before a crowd of 11,120. Paige won the pitchers' duel 2–1, striking out 12 Monarchs for a tournament total of 44 strikeouts in 28 innings. The 1934 tournament was Paige's first major exposure in front of the white press.

Paige received his first East–West All Star Game selection in 1934. Playing for the East, Paige came in during the sixth inning with a man on second and the score tied 0–0, and proceeded to strike out Alec Radcliffe and retire Turkey Stearnes and Mule Suttles on soft fly balls. The East scored one run in the top of the eighth and Paige held the West scoreless the rest of the way, giving him his first All-Star Game victory. 27 years after winning the second-ever East-West All-Star Game, Paige was also the winning pitcher of the 1961 East-West Game, the next to last in the series.

Despite an outstanding season, Paige had a strong competitor for best Negro league pitcher of 1934, the 21-year-old Slim Jones of the Philadelphia Stars, who went 22–3 in league games. In September, a four-team charity benefit doubleheader was played at Yankee Stadium, with the second game featuring a faceoff between Paige and Jones. Paige recalled driving all night from Pittsburgh and parking near the stadium, then falling asleep in the car. A batboy found and woke him, and he got into uniform just in time for his scheduled start. In a game that was sometimes described as the greatest game in Negro league history, Paige and Jones battled to a 1–1 tie that was called because of darkness. A rematch was scheduled, and this time Paige and the Crawfords beat Jones and the Stars 3–1.

That fall, Paige faced off against major league star Dizzy Dean, who that season had won 30 regular season games plus two more in the World Series, in several exhibition games. In Cleveland, Paige struck out 13 while beating Dean 4–1, although for that game Dean was playing with a minor league team. Later, while playing in the California Winter League, Paige faced Dean in front of 18,000 fans in Los Angeles, with Dean's team including major league stars like Wally Berger. The two teams battled for 13 innings, with Paige's team finally winning 1–0. Bill Veeck, future owner of the Cleveland Indians, St. Louis Browns, and Chicago White Sox, was watching the game and many years later described it as "the greatest pitchers' battle I have ever seen." Paige and Dean would continue to barnstorm against each other until 1945. Later, when Dean was a sports columnist for the Chicago Tribune, he called Paige "the pitcher with the greatest stuff I ever saw."

In the spring of 1935, Greenlee refused Paige's request to raise his $250 per month salary, so Paige decided to return to Bismarck for the same $400 per month and late model used car that he got before. Churchill added other Negro league players to the team—pitchers Barney Morris, and Hilton Smith, catcher Quincy Trouppe, and pitcher/catcher Double Duty Radcliffe. Paige dominated the competition, with a 29–2 record, 321 strikeouts, and only 16 walks. In Wichita, Ray "Hap" Dumont was establishing a new national baseball tournament, the National Baseball Congress. Dumont invited 32 semi-pro teams, paying $1,000 for Paige and his Bismarck teammates to attend. The tournament was held at Lawrence–Dumont Stadium in Wichita, Kansas and offered a $7,000 purse. Churchill added yet another Negro league star to his team—Chet Brewer, the Kansas City Monarchs' ace pitcher. Bismarck swept the tournament in seven straight games. Paige won the four games he started, pitched in relief in a fifth game, and struck out 60 batters—a record that still held 74 years later.

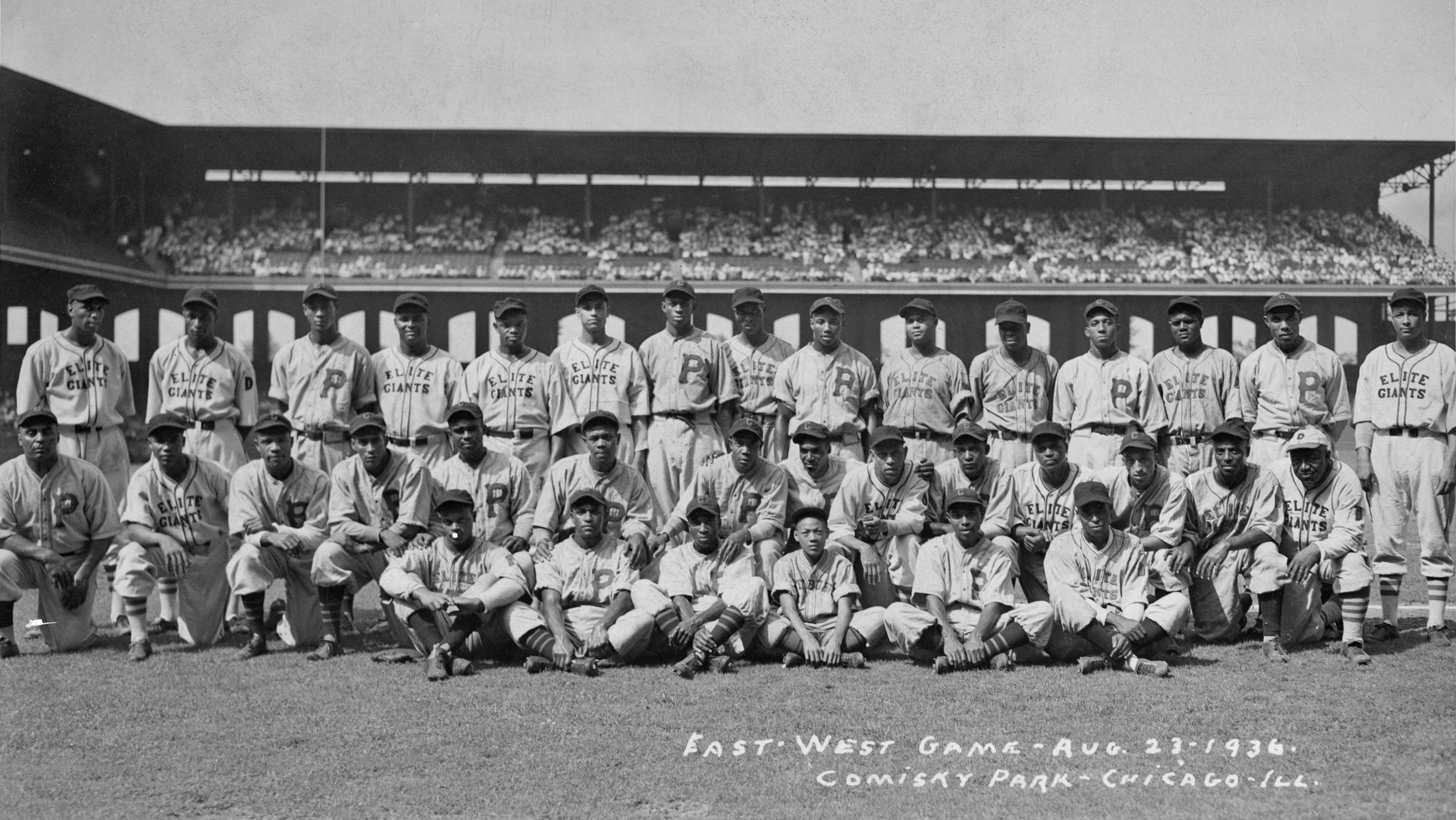
Paige at the 1936 East–West All-Star Game

In September, Paige could not return to the NNL because he was banned from the league for the 1935 season for jumping to the Bismarck team. J. L. Wilkinson, owner of the independent Kansas City Monarchs, signed Paige on a game-by-game basis through the end of the season.

That winter, a northern California promoter, Johnny Burton, hired Paige to front a team called the "Satchel Paige All-Stars," in a game to be held on February 7, 1936, in Oakland against a white all-star squad. The opposing team included a number of major league players out of the Bay Area, including Ernie Lombardi, Augie Galan, Cookie Lavagetto, and Gus Suhr, as well as Pacific Coast League star Joe DiMaggio, who was making his last stop as a minor leaguer before joining the New York Yankees. Other than Negro league catcher, Ebel Brooks, Paige's team was composed of local semi-pro players. Despite the imbalance in talent, Paige kept the game to a 1–1 tie through nine innings, striking out 12 and giving up one run on three hits. In the bottom of the tenth inning, he struck out two more, then gave up a single to Dick Bartell, bringing up DiMaggio. Bartell stole second on the first pitch, then went to third on a wild pitch. DiMaggio then hit a hard hopper to the mound that Paige deflected; DiMaggio beat the second baseman's throw to drive in the winning run. A Yankee scout watching the game wired the club that day a report that read, "DiMaggio everything we'd hoped he'd be: Hit Satch one for four."

In 1936, Paige returned to Pittsburgh where Greenlee acquiesced to Paige's salary demands and gave him a $600-per-month contract, by far the highest in the Negro leagues. In games for which complete box scores are available, Paige went 5–0, allowed 3.21 runs per game, and struck out 47 in 47 2/3 innings. At the end of the season, Tom Wilson arranged with the other NNL owners to assemble an all-star team that would enter the lucrative Denver Post tournament. The team included Paige, Josh Gibson, Cool Papa Bell, Leroy Matlock, Buck Leonard, Felton Snow, Bill Wright and Sammy Hughes. They swept the tournament in seven games to win the $5,000 prize, with Paige winning three of them. In the title game against an overmatched semi-pro team from Borger, Texas, Paige pitched a 7–0 shutout, striking out 18. The Negro league all-stars then barnstormed, playing a series against a team of major leaguers led by Rogers Hornsby. One match-up featured Paige facing the 17-year-old Bob Feller, who had just finished a half-season with the Cleveland Indians. Each pitched three innings and gave up one hit, with Feller striking out eight and Paige seven. Later in the game, the Negro league team pulled out a win.

=== Dominican Republic: 1937 ===
In the spring of 1937 the Crawfords were training in New Orleans, and Paige was approached by Dr. José Enrique Aybar, dean of the University of Santo Domingo, deputy of the Dominican Republic's national congress and director of the Dragones, a baseball team operated by Rafael Trujillo, dictator of the Dominican Republic. Aybar hired Paige to act as an agent for Trujillo in recruiting other Negro league players to play for "Los Dragones." Aybar gave Paige $30,000 to hire as many players as he could. Paige recruited five of his Crawfords teammates—Cool Papa Bell, Leroy Matlock, Sam Bankhead, Harry Williams and Herman Andrews—as well as Josh Gibson, who had recently been traded to the Homestead Grays. Other Dominican teams were also recruiting Negro league players. Greenlee and his fellow owners banned Paige and the other jumpers from the organized Negro leagues, but failed to dissuade the players.

In the Dominican Republic, the American players were shadowed by armed guards. Although the purpose of the guards was to protect the players, the players were fearful that Trujillo would unleash them in anger if his team lost the championship. The season ended with an eight-game series between the two top teams, Paige's Dragones of "Ciudad Trujillo" (as Trujillo had renamed the capital city of Santo Domingo) and the Águilas Cibaeñas of Santiago. The Dragones won the first four, with Paige contributing two of them. The Águilas came back to win the next two and still had a chance to win the championship if they won the final two games. In Paige's memoirs, he recalled finishing the game with two shutout innings to hold onto a 6–5 win while soldiers looked on "like a firing squad." In reality, however, Paige did not enter the game until there was one out in the ninth inning, with his team leading 8–3. He proceeded to give up three runs on three hits before he got the third out on a great throw by Bankhead. Paige had an excellent season overall, however, leading the league with an 8–2 record.

Paige and the other players returning from the Dominican Republic faced a Negro league ban for jumping their teams. In response, they formed a barnstorming team called "Trujillo's All-Stars," which was later known as the "Satchel Paige All-Stars." Wilkinson evaded the ban by having promoter Ray Dean schedule games between the All-Stars and the House of David. In August, the All-Stars won the Denver Post tournament. In late September, Paige faced a team of Negro league all-stars at the Polo Grounds. Despite striking out eight and allowing only two runs, he lost when the opposing pitcher, Johnny "Schoolboy" Taylor, tossed a no-hitter. A week later a rematch was held at Yankee Stadium, and this time Paige beat Taylor handily.

=== Mexico: 1938 ===
In 1938, Greenlee, who still held Paige's NNL contract, again made an unsuccessful attempt to sign Paige. Greenlee then sold his contract to the Newark Eagles for $5,000, but they could not sign him either. Paige instead went to play in the Mexican League.

Jorge Pasquel, a Mexican baseball executive and businessman, and his four brothers wanted the Mexican League to compete with the major leagues. Their plan to do that was to hire the best Negro league players who were ignored by the big leagues, then raid big league teams and field integrated clubs in the name of international baseball. With this goal, they hired Paige for $2,000 per month to play for the moribund Club Agrario of Mexico City, to create a rivalry for Club Azules of Veracruz, a powerhouse bunch led by Martín Dihigo. Back in the states, Greenlee, out $5,000, declared Paige "banned forever from baseball."

Pitching in Venezuela, Paige felt pain in his right shoulder. After he arrived in Mexico, the pain developed into the first major injury of his career. He tried to pitch through the pain, and managed to beat Dihigo in their first match-up in early September, allowing one run in eight innings. Two weeks later they faced off again, and this time Paige could barely lift his arm. He managed to go six-plus innings in a game that Paige's team ultimately lost 10–3. One sportswriter wrote that Paige looked like a "squeezed lemon."

Paige returned to his hotel room. He recalled that the next morning, "My stomach got sick with the pain that shot up my right arm. Sweat popped out all over me. The pain wouldn't quit. I tried lifting my arm. I couldn't. I just sat there, sweating, hurting enough to want to cry, getting sicker in the stomach and getting scared—real scared. My arm. I couldn't lift it." He was examined by physicians in Mexico and in the United States; one expert told him that he would never pitch again.

=== Kansas City Travelers: 1939 ===
With his arm injured, Paige suddenly found himself unemployable. He looked for work as a manager or coach, but was unsuccessful. One ballclub owner was willing to give him a chance to play ball again—J.L. Wilkinson of the Monarchs. Wilkinson offered him the modest opportunity to play, not for the Negro American League Monarchs, but for a second-string barnstorming team called the Travelers, which was now renamed the Satchel Paige All-Stars. Paige would pitch when he could and play first base when he could not.

Managed by Newt Joseph, the team also included Byron "Mex" Johnson, but otherwise it mostly functioned as a minor-league team staffed by marginal, aging, or young players. Playing throughout Kansas, Missouri, the Dakotas, Illinois, and even Utah, large crowds turned out to see Paige throw an inning or two, relying on junkballs. Paige recalled, "Everybody'd heard I was a fastballer and here I was throwing Alley Oops and bloopers and underhand and sidearm and any way I could to get the ball up to the plate and get it over, maybe even for a strike. But even that made my arm ache like a tooth was busting every time I threw. And the balls I was throwing never would fool anybody in the Negro leagues, not without a fast ball to go with them."

Sometime that summer Paige's fast ball returned. Paige's catcher, Frazier "Slow" Robinson, recalled that one afternoon Paige told him, "You better be ready because I'm ready today." Paige then surprised him when, with Robinson expecting a lob, Paige "threw that baseball so hard that he knocked the mitt off my hand." Modern sports medicine specialists suggest that Paige suffered from a partially torn rotator cuff in his shoulder caused by repetitive stress. Paige's recovery was assisted by the Monarch's long-time trainer, Frank "Jewbaby" Floyd, who was sent by Wilkinson to work with Paige. Floyd worked with massage, hot and cold water, ointments, and chiropractic. He had Paige rest his arm by pitching fewer innings and playing other positions.

By late fall his team was playing well against major Negro league teams. On September 22, 1939, in the second game of a double-header against the powerful American Giants, Paige won a 1–0 game, striking out 10 men in the seven innings before the game was called on account of darkness. Buck O'Neil, who had batted against Paige in 1935 and 1936 and faced him again in a game against the parent Monarchs, recalled a dropoff in speed but an improvement in deception. "He could still throw hard. Not as hard as he had thrown, but you're talkin' about somebody thrown' ninety-eight, a hundred miles an hour. But now he's throwin' maybe ninety—which is still more than the average guy ... He was the best and, actually, he was so deceptive! You'd look at that big ol' slow arm movin' and—chooo—that ball's just right by you. And then he'd come up and throw you a change of pace and, oh, man."

=== Puerto Rico: 1939–40 ===
In just one season, Paige left his mark on Puerto Rican baseball. He arrived in Puerto Rico in late October, four weeks after the start of the 1939–40 winter season, and joined the Brujos de Guayama (the Guayama Witch Doctors). The town of Guayama is widely known for its Santería, Palo, and other spiritualist religious practices. In a legendary game in Guayama, Paige walked off the mound because he saw a ghost standing next to him.

A team that featured shortstop Perucho Cepeda and outfielder Tetelo Vargas, the Guayama Witch Doctors were the 1938–39 champions. In September 1939, they had won the semi-pro baseball "World Series" in Puerto Rico against the Duncan Cementeers. On November 5, Paige pitched a shutout against rival Santurce, which featured player-manager Josh Gibson, by a lopsided score of 23–0.

In a December game against Mayagüez, Paige set a league record by striking out 17. He ended the season with a 19–3 record, a 1.93 ERA, and 208 strikeouts in 205 innings. The 19 wins and 208 strikeouts set league single-season records that have never been broken. Paige helped his team win the league championship playoff series, winning two games against the San Juan Senadores.

Puerto Rican pitcher Ramón Bayron recalled, "It took special eyes to see his pitches." Luis Olmo, who later played with the Brooklyn Dodgers, described Paige that winter as "the best I've ever seen."

=== Kansas City Monarchs: 1940–1947 ===
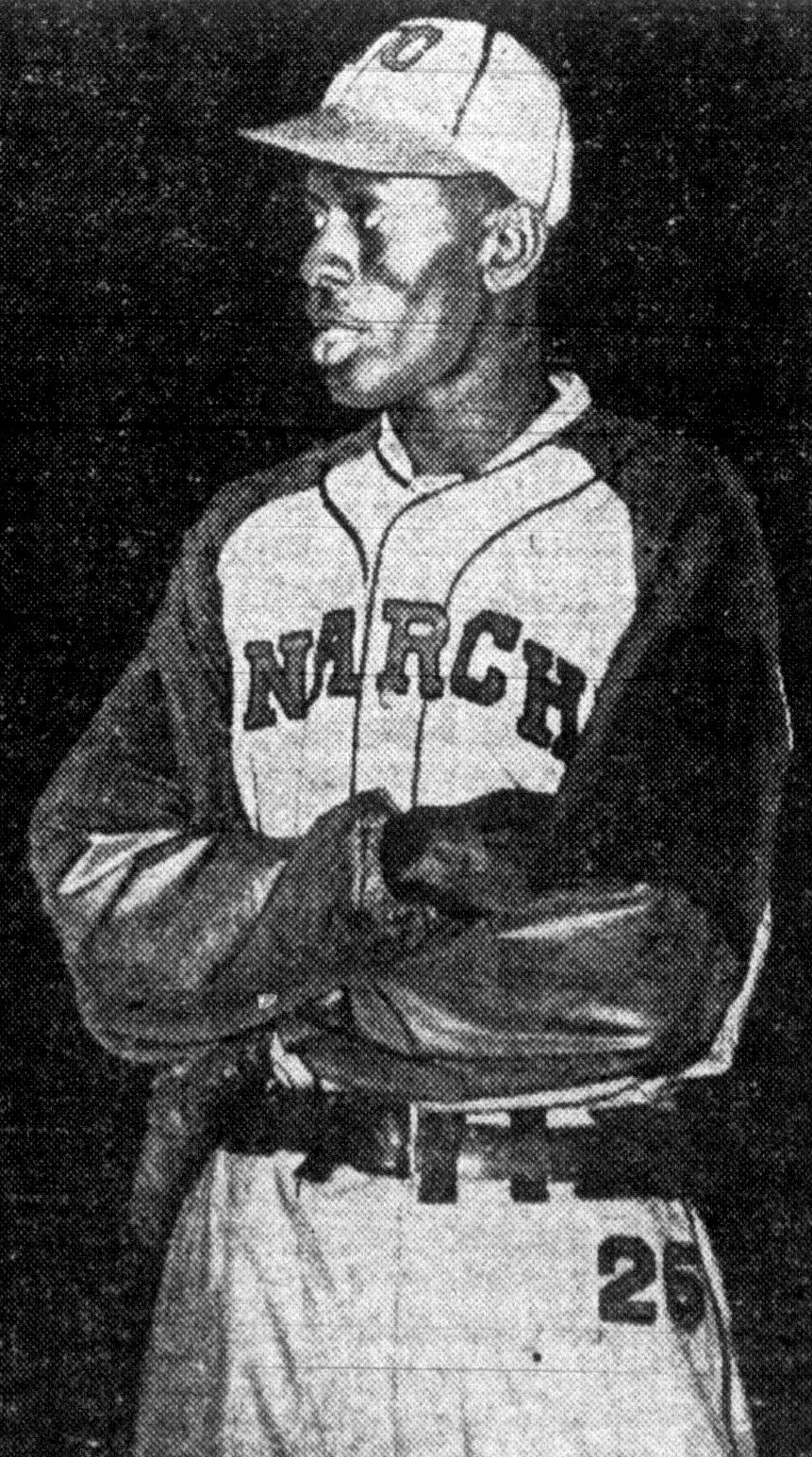
Paige, circa 1942

Paige returned to the Travelers for the 1940 season. Abe and Effa Manley, owners of the Newark Eagles, still claimed that they still held the rights to Paige's Negro league contract, and retaliated against Wilkinson by signing players from Wilkinson's Negro American League. In late June, the NNL and NAL leaders met to discuss the situation and reached an agreement that allowed Paige to advance to the Kansas City Monarchs and let the Manleys keep the players they had recruited in violation of the inter-league rules. Late in the 1940 season, Paige was promoted to the Monarchs. On September 12, Paige made his debut with the Monarchs against the American Giants and pitched a five-inning darkness-shortened complete game. The Monarchs won 9–3 and Paige struck out ten.

Because of Paige's strong gate appeal, there was considerable demand by outside teams to lease Paige's services to pitch for a single game. With infrequent league games, Wilkinson booked Paige to pitch for small-town teams or other Negro league teams at rates ranging from a third of the total receipts to a fixed fee $250 to $2,000 per game, plus expenses. Wilkinson purchased a Douglas DC-3 airplane just to ferry Paige around to these outside appearances. Because of the larger gate when Paige pitched, the Monarchs' owners could also insist on a larger share of the receipts from their road games. Wilkinson and Paige each kept a share of the fees. By the early 1940s, Paige's estimated annual earnings were $40,000, which was four times the pay of the average player on the major league New York Yankees and nearly matched the pay of their top star, Joe DiMaggio.

Hoping for some publicity for Paige, who had received relatively little coverage while pitching in the hinterlands with the Travelers, Wilkinson arranged for Paige to pitch on opening day of 1941 for the New York Black Yankees. Appearing in front of a crowd of 20,000 fans at Yankee Stadium, Paige pitched a complete game, 5–3 victory, striking out eight. As intended, the contest brought considerable coverage from both the black and white media, including a pictorial by Life magazine.

Paige took over the role of ace pitcher for the Monarchs, while Hilton Smith, their former ace, dropped to number two pitcher and sometimes was relegated to relieving Paige. Because of Paige's ability to draw a crowd, he would often be scheduled to start a game and pitch for three innings, with Smith or another teammate assigned to pitch the last six. In addition to Smith, Paige's teammates included first baseman Buck O'Neil, shortstop and manager Newt Allen, and center fielder Willard Brown. In 1941, the Monarchs won their third consecutive Negro American League championship. Though no standings were published, according to historian John Holway, they had a 24–6 team record for a winning percentage of .800, placing them five games ahead of the second-place New Orleans/St. Louis Stars.

On August 1, 1941, Paige made his first appearance in the East–West All Star Game in five years, collecting 305,311 votes, 40,000 more than the next highest player, Buck Leonard. Paige entered the game at the start of the eighth inning with the East leading 8–1 and pitched the last two innings. The only hit he gave up was a slow roller to the NNL's new starting catcher, the Baltimore Elite Giants' Roy Campanella.

With America's entrance into World War II, Dizzy Dean came out of retirement, forming an all-star team consisting of recently drafted white major league and minor league players. On May 24, Dean faced Paige and the Monarchs in an exhibition game at Wrigley Field, the first time a black team ever played at Wrigley. The Monarchs defeated Dean's All-Stars 3–1 in front of a crowd of 29,775. On May 31, Paige teamed up with the Homestead Grays to face Dean's All-Stars again before 22,000 fans at Griffith Stadium. The Grays won 8–1, with Paige striking out seven (including Washington Senators star Cecil Travis) in five innings of work.

In the 1942 East-West All-Star Game, Paige entered in the top of the seventh with the score tied 2–2. Pitching the last three innings, he allowed three runs on five hits and was charged with the loss in the 5–2 game.

==== 1942 Negro World Series ====
The Monarchs won the Negro American League pennant again in 1942. For the first time since 1927, the champions of the two leagues, Kansas City and Washington/Homestead, met in the Negro World Series. Paige started game one in Washington and pitched five shutout innings. The Monarchs scored their first run in the top of the sixth. In the bottom of the frame, Jack Matchett relieved Paige and finished the game, with Kansas City adding seven more runs to win 8–0.

Game two was played two days later in Pittsburgh, and a highlight was Paige's dramatic showdown with Josh Gibson. In the bottom of the sixth, Paige relieved starter Hilton Smith with the Monarchs ahead 2–0. In the seventh inning, he gave up three singles and faced Gibson with the bases loaded and two outs. Gibson fouled off the first two pitches, then whiffed on the third. When Paige told the story in his autobiography, he mythologized the story. According to Paige, the strikeout came in the ninth inning with a one-run lead, and he walked the three batters ahead of Gibson in order to face him. The mythical version was retold by Buck Leonard and Buck O'Neil in their memoirs. In the actual game, the Monarchs added three runs in the top of the eighth to take a 5–0 lead, then Paige gave up four in the bottom of the frame to make it 5–4. The Monarchs added another three in the top of the ninth and won 8–4.

After two days rest, Paige started game three, which was played in Yankee Stadium. Paige gave up two runs in the first and was pulled after two innings. Matchett pitched the remainder of the game, which the Monarchs won, 9–3, giving them a 3–0 lead in the series. The next series game was played a week later in Kansas City. When the injury-plagued Grays brought in star players from other teams, including pitcher Leon Day, second baseman Lenny Pearson, and outfielder Ed Stone of the Newark Eagles and shortstop Bus Clarkson of the Philadelphia Stars, the Monarchs played under protest. Day and Paige both pitched complete games, with Paige giving up four runs on eight hits and Day giving up one run on five hits for a Grays victory. The Monarchs' protest was upheld and the game was disallowed. Game four took place in Shibe Park in Philadelphia, and Paige was scheduled to start, but he did not show up until the fourth inning. According to his autobiography, Paige was delayed in Lancaster, Pennsylvania by an arrest for speeding. The Grays had taken a 5–4 lead, and Paige immediately entered the game. In the remainder of the game, he did not allow a hit or a run and struck out six, while the Monarchs' hitters scored two runs in the seventh to take the lead and three more in the eighth to win, 9–5, and sweep the series. Paige had pitched in all four official games in the Series (as well as one unofficial one), going 16 innings, striking out 18, and giving up eight hits and six runs.

==== 1943–1946 ====
Paige (left) and Jackie Robinson in the uniform of the Kansas City Monarchs, 1945

Paige was the West's starting pitcher in the 1943 East-West All-Star Game, played before a record 51,723 fans in Comiskey Park. He pitched three scoreless innings without giving up a hit, struck out four, walked one, and was credited as the winning pitcher in the West's 2–1 victory. As a batter, he hit a double to lead off the bottom of the third, then was lifted for a pitch runner to "thunderous applause."

World War II caused a large number of baseball players to be inducted into military service. Among Paige's Kansas City teammates, Connie Johnson, Buck O'Neil, and Ted Strong entered military service that year, and Willard Brown followed them the following season. Paige's Selective Service records show that during the war his draft status evolved from 1-A (available to be drafted) to 2-A ("deferred in support of national health, safety, or interest") to the final 4-A (too old for service, even though when he registered he gave a birth date of 1908, two years younger than his actual birth date). Paige continued to play, and the available statistics show a slip in performance in 1943, with a 6–8 record and a 4.59 run average (his highest average since 1929) reported for the Monarchs. The Monarchs' string of four straight pennants ended, as the Negro American League title was captured by the Birmingham Black Barons in 1943 and 1944 and by the Cleveland Buckeyes in 1945. In 1944, Paige won six games while striking out 85 batters with a 0.72 ERA.

Before the 1944 East-West All-Star Game—black baseball's most lucrative event—Paige grabbed headlines when he demanded that the owners contribute the receipts to the war relief fund, threatening a player strike if they did not accede. The owners were able to turn the other players and fans against Paige, however, when they revealed that Paige had received $800 for participating in the 1943 game (in contrast to the $50 paid to the other players) and had demanded an extra cut for the 1944 game as well. Paige was removed from the roster and the strike was averted when the owners agreed to raise the player payments (the East's team accepted $200 each, while the West's players agreed to $100).

In 1946, many of the Monarchs' players, including Willard Brown, Connie Johnson, Buck O'Neil, Ford Smith, and Ted Strong, returned from military service, and the team led the NAL in both the first and second halves, capturing the league pennant. O'Neil led the league in batting average, Brown in home runs, Johnson in wins, and Paige in total run average.

==== 1946 Negro World Series ====
The Monarchs faced the Newark Eagles in the 1946 Negro World Series. The first game was played at the Polo Grounds and Hilton Smith started for the Monarchs. The Monarchs held a 1–0 lead in the bottom of the sixth, when Smith walked Larry Doby to lead off the inning, and Paige was called in to relieve. Paige struck out Monte Irvin and Lenny Pearson, but Doby stole second and Paige gave up a single to Johnny Davis, which tied the game. In the top of the seventh, the Monarchs got the lead back when Paige hit a single, advanced to second on an error, and scored on a hit by Herb Souell. Paige shut down the Eagles for the rest of the game, striking out eight and allowing four hits over four innings, and was credited with the win.

Two days later, Paige came into the second game in a similar situation as the first, but the result was quite different. Ford Smith started the game for the Monarchs, and he had a 4–1 lead entering the bottom of the seventh. After allowing two runs and with Irvin on first, Paige was brought in to protect the 4–3 lead. This time, however, Paige gave up four hits before the end of the inning, and four runs crossed the plate. Paige finished the game, but was charged with the loss in the 7–4 game.

The next two games were played in Kansas City, and the Monarchs won game three, getting a complete game from Jim LaMarque. Ted Alexander started game four, but gave way to Paige in the top of the sixth with the Monarchs trailing 4–1. Paige gave up three runs on three hits in the sixth, including a home run to Irvin. He went on to finish the game, giving up one more run in the seventh, and the Monarchs lost 8–1.

Kansas City won the fifth game and Newark won the sixth. For the deciding game seven, Paige was missing. Buck O'Neil believed Paige was meeting with Bob Feller about their upcoming barnstorming tour. With Ford Smith pitching, the Monarchs lost 3–2, and the Eagles claimed the championship.

==== Barnstorming with Feller: 1946–1947 ====
In late 1946, Bob Feller organized the first barnstorming tour to use airplanes to travel from site to site. His tour has been described as "the most ambitious baseball undertaking since John McGraw and Charles Comiskey dreamed up their round-the-world junket in 1913." For his team, Feller recruited all-stars from both major leagues. As his main opponent, he asked Paige to head a team of Negro league all-stars.

Feller's team included 1946 American League batting champion, Mickey Vernon, at first base, Johnny Beradino at second, Phil Rizzuto at shortstop, and Ken Keltner at third. The outfielders were Jeff Heath, Charlie Keller, and Sam Chapman; after the World Series was over, National League batting champion Stan Musial would also join the tour. Catching was shared by Jim Hegan and Frankie Hayes. In addition to Feller, the pitching staff included Bob Lemon, Dutch Leonard, Johnny Sain, Spud Chandler, and Fred Hutchinson.

With help from J.L. Wilkinson and Tom Baird, Paige assembled a team that included first baseman Buck O'Neil, second baseman Hank Thompson, shortstops Chico Renfroe and Artie Wilson, third basemen Howard Easterling and Herb Souell, outfielders Gene Benson and Johnny Davis, catcher Quincy Trouppe, and pitchers Barney Brown, Gentry Jessup, Rufus Lewis, Hilton Smith, and Neck Stanley.

Feller scheduled 35 games in 31 cities in 17 states, all to be played in 27 days. The tour would require 13,000 miles of travel. Several same-day multi-city doubleheaders were to be played. Feller leased two DC-3 airplanes, with "Bob Feller All-Stars" painted on one fuselage and "Satchel Paige All-Stars" on the other. While Feller's team would face several other opponents, the majority of the games were against Paige's team. Feller and Paige would start each game whenever possible and usually pitch one to five innings.

The first game was played at Forbes Field in Pittsburgh on September 30, two days after the end of the major league season and one day after the final game of the Negro World Series. Paige and Feller each pitched three innings and left the game with the score tied 1–1. Feller struck out three and gave up two hits, while Paige struck out four and gave up only one hit. Paige's team broke the tie in the seventh inning when Hank Thompson walked and stole second and Souell drove him home with a single up the middle.

Over the next six days, Feller's team won games in Youngstown, Cleveland, Chicago, Cincinnati, New York, and Newark, before Paige's team won a second game in New York. Paige pitched five shutout innings in Yankee Stadium before a crowd of 27,462. After the game they flew to Baltimore, where that same evening Paige's team beat Feller's. The next day, Paige's team won again in Columbus. From there, Feller's team won games in Dayton, Ohio, Richmond, Indiana, Council Bluffs, Iowa, and Wichita, Kansas. They then played two games in Kansas City, with Paige's team winning the first game on a three-run walk-off home run by Johnny Davis, and Feller's team winning the second. After that series, Feller's team continued on to Denver and California, while most of Paige's team left the tour. Paige, however, continued on to California where he joined a lesser team, Chet Brewer's Kansas City Royals, which was scheduled to play Feller's All-Stars.

Paige faced Feller in Los Angeles and in San Diego and lost both games. Another scheduled match-up was cancelled when Paige filed a lawsuit against Feller, claiming that Feller had not paid some of the money he was owed. Overall, Feller had pitched 54 innings against Paige's team and given up 15 runs, an average of 2.50 per nine innings. Paige had pitched 42 innings and allowed 18 runs, or 3.86 per nine innings.

After the 1947 season, Feller organized another all-star team for a barnstorming tour. This time, Paige was not invited to tour with him, with Feller opting to play more games in the South against white opponents. Paige did face Feller twice, however, while playing with Chet Brewer's Kansas City Royals in Los Angeles. In the first game, on October 15, both pitchers went four innings. Feller gave up four hits and one walk and struck out two, while Paige gave up just two hits and one walk and struck out seven. Nevertheless, Paige took the loss when he gave up a run in the fourth when Keltner singled and later scored on a sacrifice fly by Heath. On October 19, they again faced each other in front of a crowd of 12,000-plus. Both pitchers went five innings. Paige allowed three hits and no walks, and struck out eight, including Ralph Kiner twice. He left the game with a 1–0 lead, but Feller's team came back in the late innings to win 2–1.

== American and National League ==
=== Cleveland Indians ===
On July 7, 1948, Cleveland Indians owner Bill Veeck brought Paige in to try out with Indians player-coach Lou Boudreau. On that same day, his 42nd birthday, Paige signed his first major league contract, for $40,000 for the three months remaining in the season, becoming the first black pitcher in the American League and the seventh black big leaguer overall. On July 9, 1948, Paige became the oldest man ever to debut in the National League or American League, at the age of 42 years and two days. When asked about his age, he would reply "If someone asked you how old you were and you didn't know your age, how old would you think you were?" With the St. Louis Browns beating the Indians 4–1 in the bottom of the fourth inning, Boudreau pulled his starting pitcher, Bob Lemon, and sent Paige in. Paige, not knowing the signs and not wanting to confuse his catcher, pitched cautiously. Chuck Stevens lined a ball to left field for a single. Jerry Priddy bunted Stevens over to second. Up next was Whitey Platt, and Paige decided to take command. He threw an overhand pitch for a strike and one sidearm for another strike. Paige then threw his "Hesitation Pitch" (see "pitching style" section below), which surprised Platt so much that he threw his bat 40 feet up the third base line. Browns manager Zack Taylor bolted from the dugout to talk to umpire Bill McGowan about the pitch, claiming it was a balk, but McGowan let it stand as a strike. Paige then got Al Zarilla to fly out to end the inning. The next inning, he gave up a leadoff single, but with his catcher having simplified his signals, Paige got the next batter to hit into a double play, followed by a pop fly. Larry Doby pinch-hit for Paige the following inning.

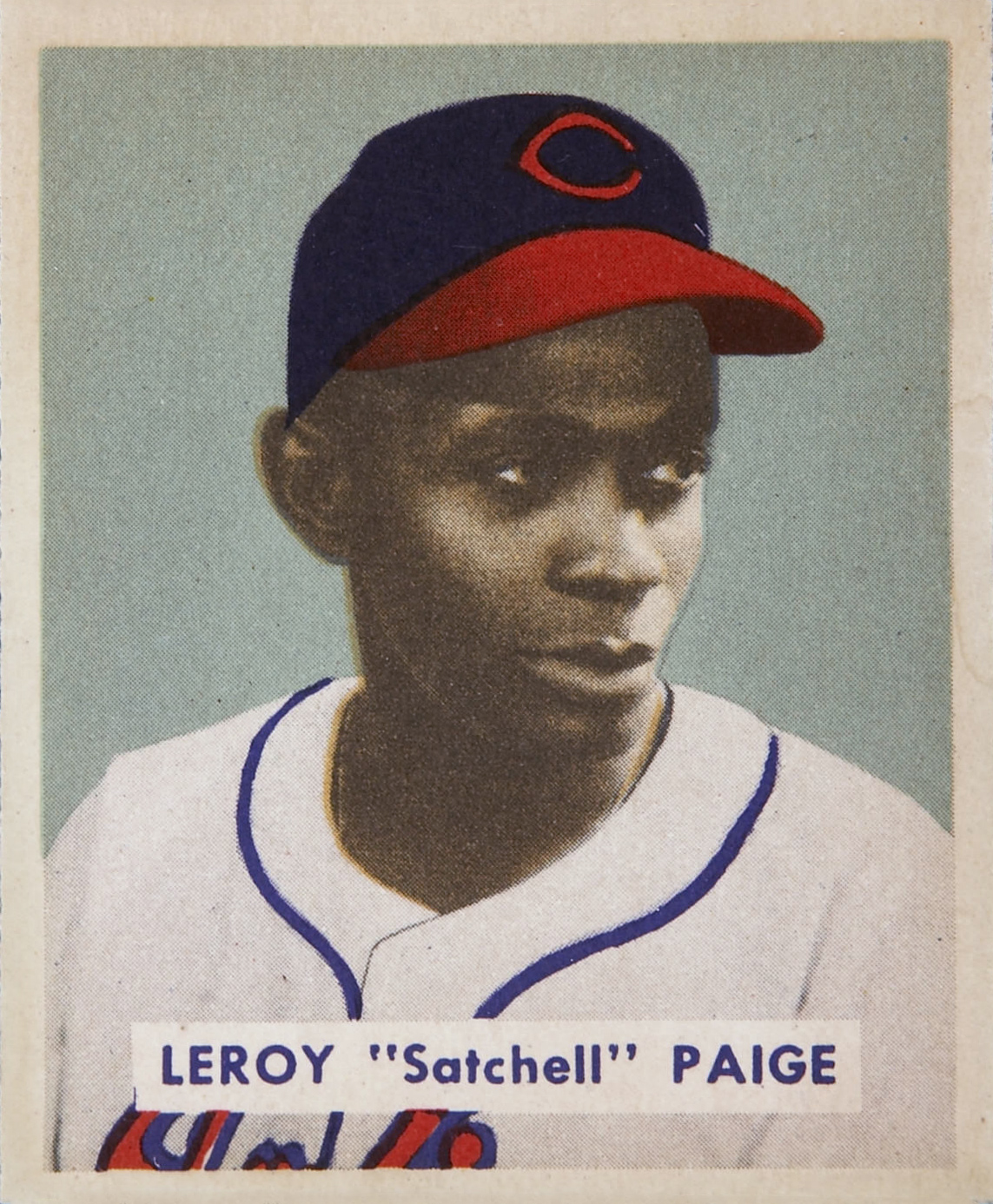
Paige's 1949 Bowman Gum baseball card, during his tenure with the Indians

Paige got his first big league victory on July 15, 1948, the night after he pitched in an exhibition game against the Brooklyn Dodgers in front of 65,000 people in Cleveland's Municipal Stadium. It came at Philadelphia's Shibe Park. The Indians were up 5–3 and the bases were loaded in the sixth inning of the second game of a double header. He got Eddie Joost to fly out to end the inning, but gave up two runs the next inning when Ferris Fain doubled and Hank Majeski hit a home run. Paige buckled down and gave up only one more hit the rest of the game, getting five of the next six outs on fly balls.

Longtime Chicago Cubs broadcaster Jack Brickhouse once said with amusement that Paige "threw a lot of pitches that were not quite 'legal' and not quite 'illegal.'" American League President Will Harridge eventually ruled the hesitation pitch illegal and stated that if Paige threw it again, it would be called a balk. Paige said, "I guess Mr. Harridge did not want me to show up those boys who were young enough to be my sons."

On August 3, 1948, with the Indians one game behind the Athletics, Boudreau started Paige against the Washington Senators in Cleveland. The 72,562 people that saw the game set a new attendance record for a major league night game. Although a nervous Paige walked two of the first three batters and gave up a triple to Bud Stewart to fall behind 2–0, by the time he left in the seventh, the Indians were up 4–2 and held on to give him his second victory. His next start was at Comiskey Park in Chicago. 51,013 people paid to see the game, but many thousands more stormed the turnstiles and crashed into the park, overwhelming the few dozen ticket-takers. Paige went the distance, shutting out the White Sox, 5–0, debunking the assumption that nine innings of pitching was now beyond his capabilities.

The Indians were in a heated pennant race on August 20, 1948. Coming into the game against the White Sox, Bob Lemon, Gene Bearden and Sam Zoldak had thrown shutouts to run up a 30-inning scoreless streak, 11 shy of the big league record. 201,829 people had come to see his last three starts. For this game in Cleveland, 78,382 people came to see Paige, a full 6,000 more people than the previous night game attendance record. Paige went the distance, giving up two singles and one double for his second consecutive three hit shutout. At that point in the season, Paige was 5–1 with an astoundingly low 1.33 ERA. He made one appearance in the 1948 World Series. He pitched for two-thirds of an inning in Game Five while the Indians were trailing the Boston Braves. Paige gave up a sacrifice fly to Warren Spahn, got called for a balk, and got Tommy Holmes to ground out to shortstop Lou Boudreau. The Indians won the series in six games.

Paige ended the 1948 season with a 6–1 record with a 2.48 ERA, 2 shutouts, 43 strikeouts, 22 walks and 61 base hits allowed in 72 2/3 innings. There was some discussion of Paige possibly winning the Rookie of the Year Award. While technically a "rookie" to the majors, the 20-plus-year veteran Paige regarded such an idea with disdain and considered rejecting the award if it were to be given. The issue proved moot, as both versions of the award (by Major League Baseball and by Sporting News) were given to other players. The year 1949 was not nearly as good for Paige as 1948. He ended the season with a 4–7 record and was 1–3 in his starts with a 3.04 ERA. After the season, with Veeck selling the team to pay for his divorce, the Indians gave Paige his unconditional release.

=== St. Louis Browns ===
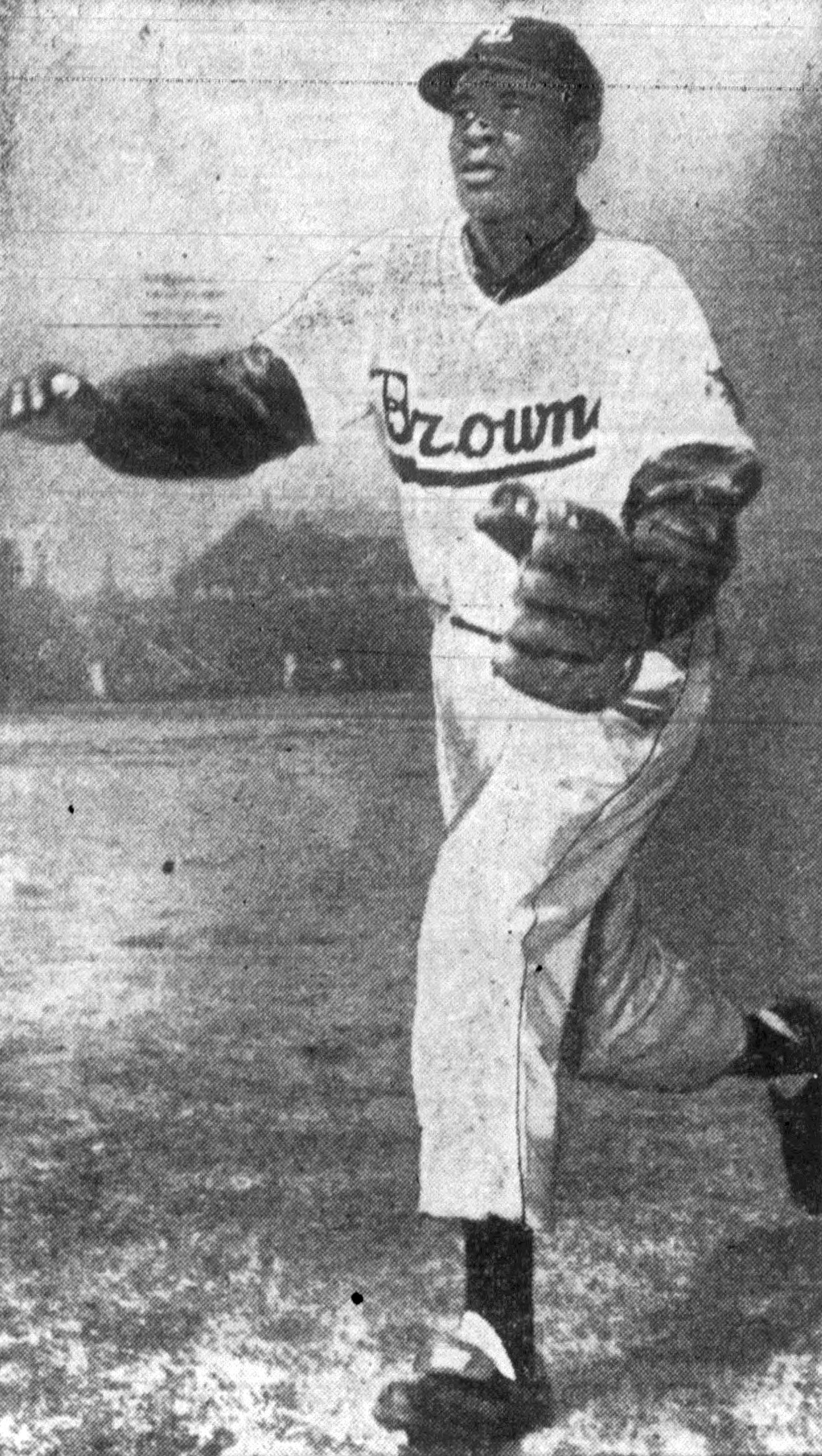
Paige as a member of the St. Louis Browns, circa 1951–1953

Penniless, Paige returned to his barnstorming days after being released from the Indians. When Veeck bought an 80% interest in the St. Louis Browns he soon signed Paige. In his first game back in the major leagues, on July 18, 1951, against the Washington Senators, Paige pitched six innings of shutout baseball until the seventh when he gave up three runs. He ended the season with a 3–4 record and a 4.79 ERA.

In 1952, Rogers Hornsby took over as manager of the Browns, and despite past accusations of racism, Hornsby was less hesitant to use Paige than Boudreau was four years before. Paige was so effective that when Hornsby was fired by Veeck, his successor Marty Marion seemed not to want to risk going more than three games without using Paige in some form. By July 4, with Paige having worked in 25 games, Casey Stengel named him to the American League All-Star team, making him the first black pitcher on an AL All-Star team. The All-Star game was cut short after five innings due to rain and Paige never got in. Stengel resolved to name him to the team the following year. Paige finished the year 12–10 with a 3.07 ERA for a team that lost ninety games.

Stengel kept his word and named Paige to the 1953 All-Star team despite Paige not having a very good year. Paige ended the year with a disappointing 3–9 record. Paige was released after the season when Veeck sold the Browns.

=== Hiatus from the Major Leagues ===
Paige once again returned to his barnstorming days. Then, on August 14, 1955, Paige signed a contract with the Greensboro Patriots of the Carolina League.

Veeck once again came to Paige's rescue when, after taking control of the Phillies' Triple-A farm team, the Miami Marlins of the International League, he signed Paige to a contract for $15,000 and a percentage of the gate. Paige finished the season 11–4 with an ERA of 1.86 with 79 strikeouts and only 28 walks. This time, when Veeck left the team, Paige was allowed to stay on, for two more years.

In 1957, the Marlins finished in sixth place, but Paige had a 10–8 record with 76 strikeouts versus 11 walks and 2.42 ERA. The following year, Paige finished 10–10, saying that he would not return to Miami in 1959. In 1959, Paige returned to his barnstorm roots and signed a pitching contract with the Havana Cuban Stars who were owned by Dempsey Hovland. Paige was in and out of baseball, pitching sporadically, over the next decade.

At the age of 55, in 1961, Paige signed on with the Triple-A Portland Beavers of the Pacific Coast League, pitching 25 innings, striking out 19 and giving up eight earned runs. He failed to record a single decision in his stint with the Beavers.

=== Kansas City Athletics ===
In 1965, Kansas City Athletics owner Charles O. Finley signed Paige, 59 at the time, for one game. On September 25, against the Boston Red Sox, Finley invited several Negro league veterans, including Cool Papa Bell, to be introduced before the game. Paige was in the bullpen, sitting on a rocking chair, being served coffee by a "nurse" between innings. He started the game by getting Jim Gosger out on a pop foul. The next man, Dalton Jones, reached first and went to second on an infield error, but was thrown out trying to reach third on a pitch in the dirt. Carl Yastrzemski doubled and Tony Conigliaro hit a fly ball to end the inning. The next six batters went down in order, including a strikeout of Bill Monbouquette. In the fourth inning, Paige took the mound, to be removed according to plan by Haywood Sullivan. He walked off to a standing ovation from the small crowd of 9,289. The lights dimmed and, led by the PA announcer, the fans lit matches and cigarette lighters while singing "The Old Gray Mare."

=== The end ===
In 1966, Paige continued to tour the country pitching exhibition games. On June 19, 1966, Paige took the mound for the Carolina League's Peninsula Grays against the Greensboro Yankees in a three-inning exhibition stint, not allowing a hit. Grays General Manager Marshall Fox decided to let the nearly-sixty-year-old legend pitch in a real game, which Satchel did two days later, drawing a much larger-than-usual crowd of 3,118 to War Memorial Stadium. Again facing Greensboro, Paige started the game and pitched two innings, allowing two runs on five hits, before giving way to scheduled starter (and future big-leaguer) Steve Mingori. Notably, the Grays opted to use their back-up catcher Bruce Lowell that night, and not their regular man behind the plate, future Hall of Famer Johnny Bench.

== Pitching style ==
The spectacle of watching Paige pitch was made all the more entertaining by the expansive pitching repertoire he developed over the years. In his early years, Paige was known as a pure fastball pitcher. He experimented with releasing pitches from a variety of arm angles in that time, something he would build upon later as he added more pitches to the mix. In 1933, while he was playing integrated baseball in Bismarck, North Dakota, The Bismarck Tribune reported that Paige used "a tricky delayed delivery with great effectiveness," something that would later become known as Paige's famous "hesitation pitch."

The idea came to me in a game, when the guy at bat was all tighted up waiting for my fast ball. I knew he'd swing as soon as I just barely moved. So when I stretched, I paused just a little longer with my arms above my head. Then I threw my left foot forward but I didn't come around with my arm right away. I put that foot of mine down, stopping for a second, before the ball left my hand. When my foot hit the ground that boy started swinging, so by the time I came around with the whip he was way off stride and couldn't get anywhere near the ball. I had me a strikeout.

In 1934, before a barnstorming match-up, Dizzy Dean was heard on the radio saying that "Satchel Paige has no clue how to throw a curve." In actuality, Paige had been practicing and perfecting his curveball in secret for many years. When Dean came up to bat, Satchel Paige struck him out with nothing but curveballs—officially adding the pitch to his repertoire. Paige could throw a variety of curveballs at different speeds and arm angles.

In late 1939, after Paige had recovered from the severe arm injury that jeopardized his career, he re-designed his pitching repertoire to take better care of his arm. He still had an exceptional fastball but he did away with his fast curve, deciding to only throw slow curves from that point forward. He learned to throw a knuckleball from Cool Papa Bell, a pitch which he reportedly perfected in regards to its movement, but could not always fully control. He also added a "slow sinker" and used his hesitation pitch more frequently. Along with these additions to his repertoire, Paige made greater use of his sidearm and submarine releases, which both made him a more deceptive pitcher and lessened the strain on his pitching arm. As Paige got older, he had to rely more and more on his offspeed pitches. By the time he finally got to play in the major leagues, he threw a seemingly endless variety of pitches, all of which moved. He was especially known for his tailing fastball, slow curve, hesitation pitch, a fantastic change-up, and a highly effective eephus pitch. He had unique trick pitches with unique names. Besides calling his fast ball "Long Tom," he possessed trick pitches with names such as the "Whipsy-Dipsy-Do," the "Midnight Creeper," and "the Wobbly Ball." He reportedly could deceive batters by throwing fastballs with a curveball wrist action, and vice versa. Pitching this way allowed Paige to be a highly effective pitcher, even into his fifties.

== Post-playing career ==
After the 1957 season, Paige went to the Mexican state of Durango to appear in a United Artists movie, The Wonderful Country, starring Robert Mitchum and Julie London. Paige played Sgt. Tobe Sutton, a hard-bitten cavalry sergeant of the Buffalo Soldiers.

Late in 1960, Paige began collaborating with writer David Lipman on his autobiography, which was published by Doubleday in April 1962, and ran to three printings.

In 1968, Paige assumed the position of deputy sheriff in Jackson County, Missouri, with the understanding that he need not bother to actually come to work in the sheriff's office. The purpose of the charade was to set up Paige with political credentials. In August 1968, he ran for a Missouri state assembly seat with the support of the local Democratic club against incumbent Representative Leon Jordan. Jordan defeated Paige by the margin of 1,870 votes to 382 (83–17%).

In 1968, Paige reached out to all twenty MLB teams at the time to try and join one of them on the active roster in order to reach the 158 days required to qualify for the five-year minimum for the pension. On August 12, Atlanta Braves owner William Bartholomay agreed to sign him as an adviser. On February 26, 1969, the league and the players' association altered the pension requirements, with one of the requirements stating that any player that had played at least four years could qualify for the pension, including players that had played during 1959. At any rate, Paige worked the year as an assistant trainer.

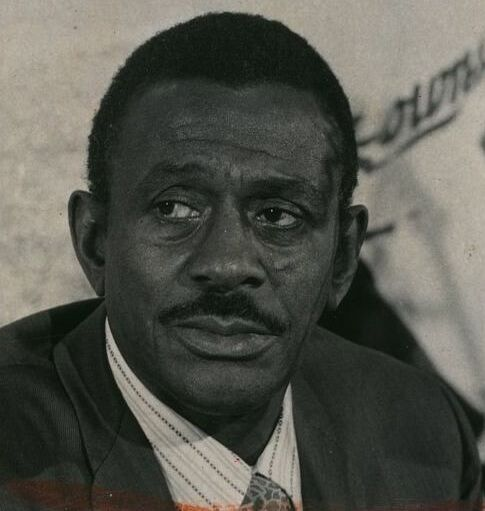
Paige in 1970

Bowie Kuhn replaced William Eckert as the Commissioner of Baseball in 1969. In the wake of Ted Williams' 1966 Hall of Fame induction speech urging the induction of Negro leaguers, and on the recommendation of the Baseball Writers' Association of America, Kuhn empowered a ten-man committee to sift through hundreds of names and nominate the first group of four Negro league players to go to the Hall of Fame. Because Paige pitched in Peninsula in 1966, he would not have been eligible for enshrinement until 1971, as players have to be out of professional baseball for at least five years before they can be elected. All of the men on the committee agreed that Paige had to be the first Negro league player to get elected. On February 9, 1971, Kuhn announced that Paige would be the first member of the Negro wing of the Hall of Fame. Because many in the press saw the suggestion of a "Negro wing" as separate but equal and denounced Major League Baseball for the idea, by the time that Paige's induction came around on August 9, Kuhn convinced the owners and the private trust of the Hall of Fame that there should be no separate wing after all. It was decided that all who had been chosen and all who would be chosen would get their plaques in the "regular" section of the Hall of Fame.

Paige took a job with the Tulsa Oilers minor league team in 1973 as their pitching coach. During the mid-to-late 1970s he finally slowed down his traveling, making only occasional personal appearances at mostly minor league stadiums and banquets.

In 1980, Paige was named vice-president of the Triple-A Springfield Cardinals, although it was mostly an honorary position.

Paige was inducted into the Baseball Reliquary's Shrine of the Eternals in 2001.

== Personal life ==
On October 26, 1934, Paige married his longtime girlfriend Janet Howard. They separated a few years later and she served Paige with divorce papers while he was walking onto the field during a game at Wrigley Field. At his court date, on August 4, 1943, Paige's divorce was finalized with him paying a one time payment of $1,500 plus Howard's $300 attorney's fees.

Paige married Lucy Maria Figueroa during his time playing in Puerto Rico in 1940, but because he was not divorced from his first wife, the marriage to Figueroa was not legal.

In 1946 or 1947, Paige married LaHoma Jean Brown. Paige and LaHoma had seven children together; LaHoma also had a daughter from an earlier marriage.

== Death ==
Paige died of a heart attack after a power failure at his home in Kansas City on June 8, 1982. He is buried on Paige Island in the Forest Hill Calvary Cemetery in Kansas City.

== Legacy ==
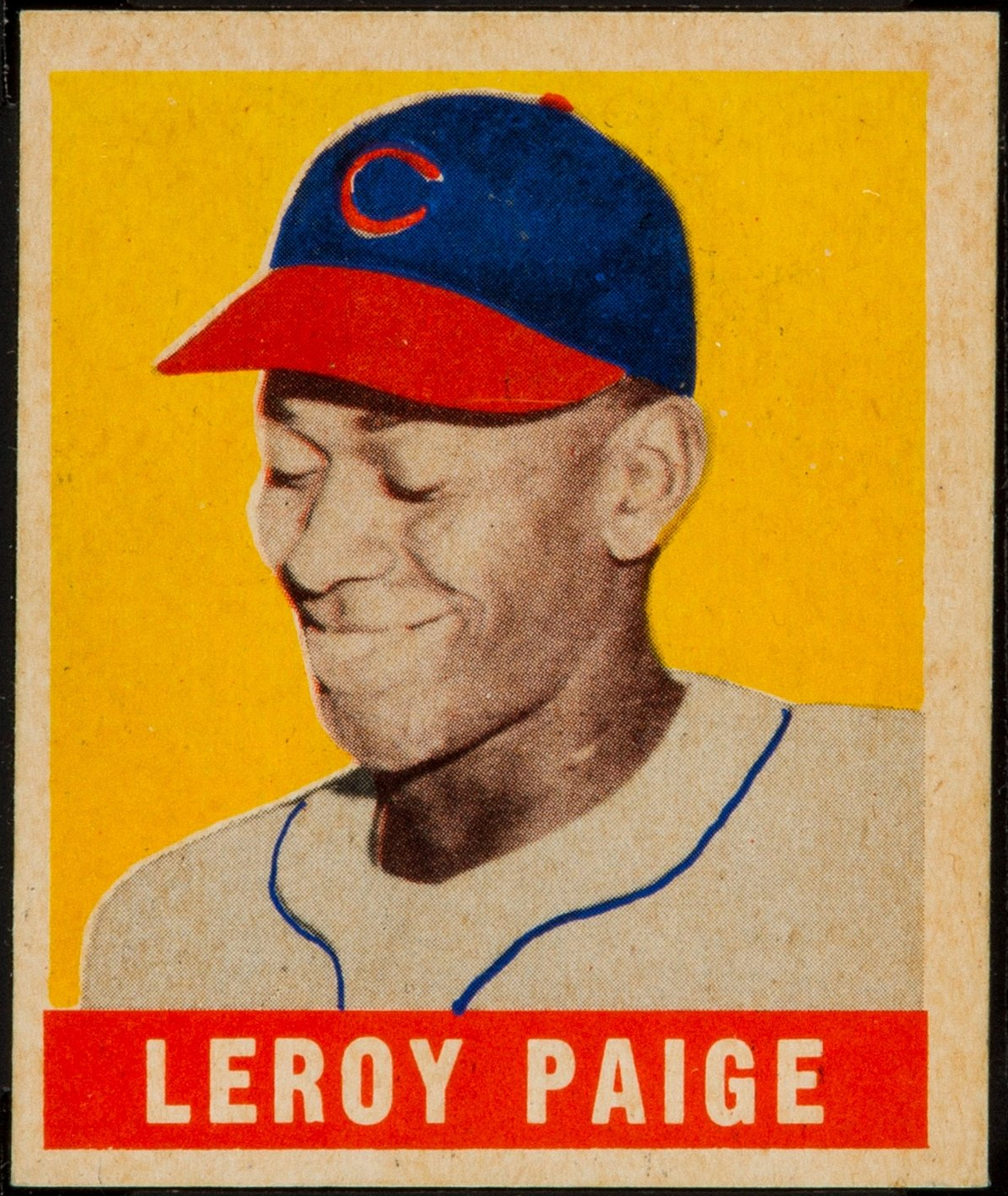
Paige's 1948 Leaf card

In 2010, sportswriter Joe Posnanski, writing for Sports Illustrated, named Paige as the hardest thrower in the history of baseball. He based this, in part, on the fact that: "Joe DiMaggio would say that Paige was the best he ever faced. Bob Feller would say that Paige was the best he ever saw. Hack Wilson would say that the ball looked like a marble when it crossed the plate. Dizzy Dean would say that Paige's fastball made his own look like a changeup." Posnanski further noted that for most of his career,

Satchel Paige threw nothing but fastballs. Nothing. Oh, he named them different names—Bat Dodger, Midnight Rider, Midnight Creeper, Jump Ball, Trouble Ball—but essentially they were all fastballs. And he was still unhittable for the better part of 15 years. One pitch. It's a lot like Mariano Rivera, except he wasn't doing it for one inning at a time. He was pitching complete games day after day. That had to be some kind of incredible fastball. ... [he was] perhaps the most precise pitcher in baseball history—he threw ludicrously hard. And he also threw hundreds and hundreds of innings.

Hall of Famer Charlie Gehringer, who faced Paige at the peak of his career, said "I never hit against anybody better."

The episode "The Ballad of Satchel Paige" from the Chicago-based Destination Freedom radio anthology series was broadcast by station WMAQ on May 15, 1948.

On May 31, 1981, the ABC made-for-television movie Don't Look Back: The Story of Leroy 'Satchel' Paige aired, starring Louis Gossett Jr. as Paige, Beverly Todd as Lahoma, and former baseball pro Bubba Phillips as Coach Hardy. Paige was paid $10,000 for his story and technical advice. The film was based on the 1962 book, Maybe I'll Pitch Forever. In August, with great difficulty because of health problems, he attended a reunion of Negro league players held in Ashland, Kentucky, that paid special tribute to him and Cool Papa Bell. Attending the reunion were Willie Mays, Buck Leonard, Monte Irvin, Judy Johnson, Chet Brewer, Gene Benson, Bob Feller and Happy Chandler.

In 1989, Satch!, a musical based on the life of Satchel Page, opened at the City Center theater in Los Angeles.

In 1996, Paige was portrayed by Delroy Lindo in the HBO made-for-television film Soul of the Game.

In 1999, he ranked Number 19 on The Sporting News' list of the 100 Greatest Baseball Players, and was nominated as a finalist for the Major League Baseball All-Century Team.

On July 28, 2006, a statue of Satchel Paige was unveiled in Cooper Park, Cooperstown, New York, commemorating the contributions of the Negro leagues to baseball.

In 1975, Count Basie and Oscar Peterson collaborated on the Pablo Records LP "'Satch' and 'Josh'"; the final track, "S & J Blues," features Basie on the Hammond (or 'ballpark') organ. Producer Norman Granz's liner notes explain that the album's concept is a matchup between Paige and batter Josh Gibson.

== Statistics ==
=== Negro leagues ===
- Negro league baseball statistics and player information from Baseball Reference (Negro leagues)

=== North Dakota ===
Year	Team	W	L	Pct	CG	IP	BB	SO	RA
1933	Bismarck	6	0	1.000	7	72.0	11	119	1.25
1935	Bismarck	29	2	.935	18	229.7	16	321	1.96
Total	2 seasons	35	2	.946	25	301.7	27	440	1.79

Note: Compiled by Tye from newspaper clippings; some clipping did not include complete stats.

=== Dominican League ===
Year	Team	League	W	L	Pct
1937	Ciudad Trujillo	Dominican League	8	2	.800

=== Mexican League ===
Year	Team	League	W	L	Pct	G	CG	IP	H	BB	SO	ERA
1938	Agrario de México	Mexican League	1	1	.500	3	0	19.3	28	12	7	5.12

Note: Paige suffered a serious arm injury while playing in Mexico.

=== Cuban (Winter) League ===
Year	Team	League	W	L	Pct	G	CG
1929/30	Santa Clara	Cuban League	6	5	.545	5	8

=== California Winter League ===
Year	Team	League	W	L	Pct	CG	IP	BB	SO
1931/32	Philadelphia Giants	California Winter	6	0	1.000	6	58	—	70
1932/33	Tom Wilson's Elite Giants	California Winter	7	0	1.000	7	63	—	91
1933/34	Wilson's Elite Giants	California Winter	16	2	.889	18	172	47	244
1934/35	Wilson's Elite Giants	California Winter	8	0	1.000	7	69	20	104
1935/36	Wilson's Elite Giants	California Winter	13	0	1.000	6	94	28	113
1943/44	Baltimore Elite Giants	California Winter	3	1	.750	1	36	10	39
1945	Kansas City Royals	California Winter	1	1	.500	1	27	12	27
1946	Kansas City Royals	California Winter	0	2	.000	0	15	7	21
1947	Kansas City Royals	California Winter	2	1	.667	1	35	14	60
Total	9 seasons		56	7	.889	47	569	—	769

=== Puerto Rican (Winter) League ===
Year	Team	League	W	L	Pct	IP	BB	SO	ERA
1939/40*	Guayama p	Puerto Rico	19†	3	.864	205	54	208†	1.93
1940/41	Guayama	Puerto Rico	4	5	.444	—	26	70	3.89
1947/48	Santurce	Puerto Rico	0	3	.000	34	13	26	2.91
Total	3 seasons		23	11	.676	—	93	304	—
* – league MVP; † – single-season league record; p = pennant.

The above venues aggregate a total of 232 victories and 89 losses, for a winning percentage of .723.

=== Major League Baseball ===
- Career statistics from ESPN · Baseball Reference · Fangraphs · Retrosheet · Baseball Almanac

=== Minor League Baseball ===
- Career statistics from ESPN · Baseball Reference · Fangraphs · Baseball Reference (Minors) · Retrosheet · Baseball Almanac

== See also ==
- List of Negro league baseball no-hitters
- List of Negro league baseball players who played in Major League Baseball
- List of athletes who came out of retirement

== General sources ==
- Appel, Jacob (2002). "Satchel Paige". St. James Encyclopedia of Pop Culture. Archived from the original on June 24, 2007.
- Clark, Dick; Lester, Larry (1994). The Negro Leagues Book. Cleveland, Ohio: Society for American Baseball Research.
- Figueredo, Jorge S. (2003). Cuban Baseball: A Statistical History, 1878–1961. Jefferson, North Carolina: McFarland & Company. ISBN 078641250X.
- Fox, William Price (2005). Satchel Paige's America. Fire Ant Books. ISBN 0817351892.
- Gay, Timothy M. (2010). Satch, Dizzy & Rapid Robert: The Wild Saga of Interracial Baseball Before Jackie Robinson. New York: Simon & Schuster. ISBN 978-1416547983.
- González Echevarría, Roberto (1999). The Pride of Havana: A History of Cuban Baseball. Oxford University Press. ISBN 0195146050.
- Hogan, Lawrence D. (2006). Shades of Glory: The Negro Leagues and the Story of African-American Baseball. Washington, D.C.: National Geographic. ISBN 079225306X.
- Holway, John B. (2001). The Complete Book of Baseball's Negro Leagues: The Other Half of Baseball History. Fern Park, Florida: Hastings House Publishers. ISBN 0803820070.
- McNary, Kyle (2000–2001). "North Dakota Integrated Baseball History". pitchblackbaseball.com. Archived from the original on July 25, 2008.
- Neyer, Rob; Eddie Epstein (2000). Baseball Dynasties: The Greatest Teams of All Time. New York: W. W. Norton & Company. ISBN 0393048942.
- Paige, Leroy (Satchel) (1993). Maybe I'll Pitch Forever. (As told to David Lipman). University of Nebraska Press. ISBN 0803287321.
- Peterson, Robert (1984). Only the Ball Was White. McGraw-Hill Book Company. ISBN 0070495998.
- Pietrusza, David; Matthew Silverman; Michael Gershman (2000). Baseball: The Biographical Encyclopedia. Total/Sports Illustrated. ISBN 9781892129345.
- Ribowsky, Mark (1994). Don't Look Back: Satchel Paige in the Shadows of Baseball. New York: Da Capo Press. ISBN 030680963X.
- Riley, James A. (2002). The Biographical Encyclopedia of the Negro Baseball Leagues. New York: Carroll & Graf. ISBN 0786709596.
- Snyder, Brad (2003). Beyond the Shadow of the Senators: The Untold Story of the Homestead Grays and the Integration of Baseball. Chicago: Contemporary Books. ISBN 0071408207.
- Spivey, Donald (2012). "If You Were Only White": The Life of Leroy "Satchel" Paige. Columbia, Missouri: University of Missouri Press.
- Treto Cisneros, Pedro (2002). The Mexican League: Comprehensive Player Statistics, 1937–2001. Jefferson, North Carolina: McFarland & Company. ISBN 0786413786.
- Tye, Larry (2009). Satchel: The Life and Times of an American Legend. New York: Random House. ISBN 978-1400066513.
- Van Hyning, Thomas E. (1995). Puerto Rico's Winter League: A History of Major League Baseball's Launching Pad. Jefferson, North Carolina: McFarland & Company. ISBN 0786419709.
