= Porter Moss =

American baseball player

- Pitcher
- Born: June 10, 1910; Cincinnati, Ohio
- Died: July 16, 1944 (aged 34); Jackson, Tennessee
- Batted: Right Threw: Right

debut
- 1932, for the Indianapolis ABCs

Last appearance
- 1944, for the Memphis Red Sox

Career statistics
- Win–loss record: 19–24
- Earned run average: 3.90
- Strikeouts: 226

Teams
- Indianapolis ABCs (1932); Cincinnati Tigers (1937); Kansas City Monarchs (1937); Chicago American Giants (1937); Memphis Red Sox (1938–1939, 1941–1944)

Career highlights and awards
- 3× East-West All-Star (1937, 1942, 1943)

Porter Moss (June 10, 1910 – July 16, 1944) was an American Negro league baseball submarine style pitcher who played primarily for the Cincinnati Tigers and the Memphis Red Sox and was a three-time participant in the Negro league All-Star game. While returning to Memphis after a game in 1944, Moss was murdered at the age of 34.

== Early years ==
Porter Moss was born June 10, 1910, in Cincinnati, Ohio. His mother is listed as Ida Calloway. Verdell Mathis, one of Moss's teammates on the Memphis Red Sox recalled, in an interview with The Cincinnati Enquirer, that Moss was a college-educated man. The first mention of Moss as a baseball pitcher in the Cincinnati newspaper is in 1933.

== Playing career ==
=== Semi-pro ===
In 1933, Porter Moss was a pitcher for the Goodyear Shoe Repair Team, a community Class A team which played against other local Cincinnati teams. Moss began to distinguish himself when on April 30, 1933, he struck out 15 batters in a game, but still lost the game. A week later, Moss again struck out 15 batters in a game. A July 10 article in The Cincinnati Enquirer recounts that the current Class A League champions, the White Sox, played the Goodyear Shoe Repair team. According to the Enquirer the White Sox pitcher Rogers and Moss “...engaged in a thrilling pitchers’ duel.” Moss struck out nine batters and Rogers retired thirteen.

=== Cincinnati Tigers ===
In 1934, Porter Moss joined the newly formed Cincinnati Tigers. The Tigers were the creation William DeHart Hubbard, a Cincinnati native and Olympic gold medalist. The Tigers began the season as a member of the Negro Southern League but it is unclear if they remained in the league since they were not mentioned in the league's second half standings. The team also joined the Indiana-Ohio League in June and played in the league through the elimination playoffs in August.

Moss had mixed results pitching for the Tigers in 1934. On June 3, Moss struck out 13 batters in a 5–2 victory over the Louisville Black Caps of the Negro Southern League; on July 13, he led the Tigers to a 4–1 victory over the Baltimore Black Sox of the Negro National League with 12 strike outs. He pitched in at least two of the four games the Tigers played during the Indiana-Ohio League elimination series and was the losing pitcher for each match. The first game of the series Moss held the Richmond Lincos to five hits and one run but the Tigers lost 1–0. The second game of the series Moss came in as a relief pitcher in the fourth inning and was removed in the eighth after giving up seven hits and five runs.

Moss continued to pitch for the Cincinnati Tigers in 1935. The Tigers played teams from the Negro Southern League, Negro National League, and the Indiana-Ohio League as an independent ball club. Moss pitched in relief in the Tigers' win against the Japanese All-Star Tokyo Giants. He also toured Canada with the Tigers in late August and early September. The Cincinnati Enquirer reported that in 1935 Moss won 35 of the 39 games he started.

Moss was elected to the East Team for the East-West All-Star game and was selected to play in the North-South Game in 1936. He did not play in the East-West game though as only three of the five pitchers were used in the game: Leroy Matlock, Bill Byrd, and Satchel Paige. Moss had a mixed record against professional teams that year. He won against the Memphis Red Sox, but lost games against the Homestead Greys and the Chicago American Giants.

The Cincinnati Tigers joined the Negro American League in 1937. Moss, who continued to pitch for the club, recorded 59 strikeouts over 86.1 innings for the year. The numbers equate to six strikeouts for every nine innings pitched. Moss was again elected to the East Team for the East-West All-Star game. This time, he pitched six innings, giving up four runs, but only one was earned, as the East lost 7–2.

=== Memphis Red Sox ===
Over the winter of 1937, the Cincinnati Tigers were sold to the owners of the Memphis Red Sox. The team was dissolved and several of the Tigers' players, including Moss, were retained by the Red Sox. Moss started eight games for the Red Sox against professional Negro League teams, going 4–3. He maintained a rate of six strikeouts per nine innings and was credited with the earning the save in two games. Memphis, with the infusion of talent from Cincinnati, won the Negro American League first half championship. Moss was once more selected to the East-West Game and also to the North-South Games. He pitched all nine innings of the second game of the Negro American League Championship against the Atlanta Black Crackers. The Black Crackers scored six runs against Moss, but the Red Sox still won by a score of 11–6. Memphis and Atlanta only played two games before the series was cancelled. Based on Memphis winning both games prior to the cancellation of the championship series the league awarded the Negro American League Championship to Memphis at their winter meeting.

Moss continued to play baseball after the Negro American League's season ended. In both the winter of 1937 and the winter of 1938 he was active in the California Winter League. Playing for the Philadelphia Royal Giants in 1938, Moss went 3–0 and had the best record in the league.

Moss's performance in 1939 was his worst performance since his rookie season. He lost three of the three games he started against teams in the professional leagues and his earned run average ballooned to 7.36. He was once again elected to the West All-Star team, but as in 1938 he did not play in the game. The Red Sox finished the 1939 season in last place.

It is unclear what Porter Moss was doing during the 1940 season since there is no Negro League records of him pitching that year. Immigration records show that in January 1941 Moss sailed to Miami from Havana, Cuba. Sailing with him was James Bell, Sam Bankhead, and Quincy Barbee. All three of these players were known to have played overseas during this period.

The 1941 and 1942 seasons saw Moss improve upon a bad 1939 season. In 1941 he started seven games against professional negro league teams, winning three and losing two. On September 18, 1941, Moss had his best performance of the year pitching against the New York Black Yankees at Holland Field. Moss pitched a complete game one hit shutout and struck out eleven batters. In 1942 Moss continued to post wins against teams such as the Cincinnati Clowns and the Kansas City Monarchs. He also returned to the East West All-Star game. Moss entered the game for the West in the third inning and relieved the starting pitcher Hilton Smith. He pitched two innings allowing the East batters to score one run off of two hits. Moss left the game with the West trailing 2–1 and the West eventual lost 5–2.

Moss was again sent to the East West All-Star game in 1943. This year he was an alternate for Hilton Smith who was ill. Early in the year he had thrown two complete games shutouts against both the Chicago American Giants and the Cincinnati Clowns. At the East-West game Moss was brought in to relieve Theolic Smith in the ninth inning. The West was leading 2–1, but with two outs the East was threatening with runners on first and second. Moss faced Victor Harris. Harris, the manager of the East team, was a dangerous hitter who posted a batting average of .358 during the 1943 season and played in the Negro League World Series that year. On the second pitch from Moss, Harris hit a fly ball to the center fielder ending the game. Moss was mobbed by the players and the crowd as he walked off the field. Still the highlight of Moss's 1943 season did not come till September 27 when he allowed no runs and no hits in nine innings pitched against the Cincinnati Clowns.

1944 was another resurgent year for the veteran Moss. In the half season that he pitched against professional Negro League teams Moss won three of the four games he started. His strikeout rate was back to over six strikeouts per nine innings pitched and his earned run average was only 2.63. The Pittsburgh Courier remarked in July that Moss was “… almost a sure bet for the East-West game this season.”

== Death ==
On the night of July 15, 55 miles from Nashville, the Memphis Red Sox's team bus broke down, not for the first time, but the driver and mechanic, Sam Thomas, could not fix the aging vehicle. With a double header scheduled the next day the team booked passage on a train at McEwen Tennessee to complete their trip to Memphis. The team was forced to sit in the overcrowded “Jim Crow” car where passengers were standing due to a lack of seats. Johnny Easley, who was drunk, was arguing with passengers and especially pestering the women in the train car. Moss approached Easley and said, “Why don’t you sit down and leave the woman alone?” Easley, upset, walked to the back of the train car. Verdell Mathis, one of Moss's teammates, noticed that Easley was carrying a gun.

As the train approached Camden, Easley began to argue with several ballplayers standing on the vestibule between the train cars. The conductor and the pullman porter confronted Easley and were also threatened. As the train was stopping at Camden, Easley jumped on to the depot platform and fired his gun into the crowd watching him from the train. The bullet missed the conductor and struck Moss in the stomach. Moss's teammates carried him to the baggage car and laid him on some old clothes. At the train's next stop, Waverly, no doctor could be found to treat Moss. A doctor did board the train at Bruceton to treat a white passenger, and a long-accepted story by teammate Verdell Mathis suggests that the (white) doctor was asked to help Moss, but he refused because of Moss's race. However, a contemporary account from the black newspaper Atlanta Daily World contradicts this assertion, describing the white doctor as giving Moss an "injection" and telling his caretakers go on to the next station where there would be a hospital to treat him.

An hour later the train pulled into Jackson. Railroad officials had called ahead and had an ambulance waiting to take Moss to the hospital, but by the time he arrived he had lost a fatal amount of blood and doctors could not save him. He died on July 16 in Jackson, more than twelve hours after he was shot. His death was announced after the first game of a Sunday double header between the Red Sox and the Cleveland Buckeyes at Russwood Field. Fans at the game stood at attention for one minute in his memory. The second game of the double header was canceled after the announcement was made.

On October 10, 1944, Easley pleaded guilty to second-degree murder in Benton County Tennessee Criminal Court. He was sentenced to ten years in prison for the murder of Moss. Five Memphis Red Sox players were present at the court to testify, but none were called to the stand. The players present were Bubber Hyde, Jimmy Ford, Red Longley, Fred Bankhead and Willie Hutchinson.

Moss left behind a wife, Artie Moss. He was buried in Cincinnati, Ohio where he was born and his mother resided.
