= Mobile Tigers =

American semi-professional baseball team

The Mobile Tigers was a semi-professional baseball team composed entirely of African-American players based in Mobile, Alabama. It was one of several Black baseball teams based in Mobile during the same period and was a training ground for at least three players who later joined the Negro leagues.

== Significant players ==
Shortly after leaving a reform school in Mount Meigs, Alabama, Satchel Paige started his career with Mobile at age 18. The employed Paige had been job hunting but in his spare time enjoyed watching his older brother Wilson playing for this team. Presenting himself in a try out to Candy Jim Taylor, the Mobile Tigers's manager at that time, Paige fired ten fastballs past Taylor. After ten pitches and ten strikes, Paige got a job with the Tigers in 1924. According to Paige, Mobile paid him "$1 when the gate was good and a keg of lemonade when it wasn't."

According to a sports writer for the Birmingham-Pittsburg Traveller, Paige's position pitching for the semi-pro Mobile Tigers was the launching pad for "one of the most successful careers in baseball history." After playing for the Mobile Tigers for one year, Paige began his professional baseball career with the Chattanooga White Sox of the Negro Southern League.

Future Negro league stars Ted Radcliffe (as well as his brother Forney) and Bobby Robinson also played on the Mobile Tigers at the same time as Paige.
