= Chattanooga Black Lookouts =

- Logo

Information
- League: Negro Southern League (1920, 1926-27)

The Chattanooga Black Lookouts were a minor league Negro league baseball team based in Chattanooga, Tennessee. They were established in 1920, only to play for one season. They were reestablished in 1926 to play for two seasons, serving as a farm team of the Homestead Grays of the Negro Northern League.

In 1926 the team purchased the contract of Satchel Paige from the semi-pro Mobile Tigers. On May 1, 1926, Paige made his Negro minor league debut. When Satchel Paige joined the team they were called the Chattanooga White Sox.
