= Neck Stanley =

American baseball player (1905–1959)

- Pitcher
- Born: May 9, 1905; Kent County, Maryland, U.S.
- Died: January 1, 1959 (aged 53); New York, New York, U.S.
- Batted: Left Threw: Left

Negro league baseball debut
- 1928, for the Bacharach Giants

Last appearance
- 1948, for the New York Black Yankees

Teams
- Bacharach Giants (1928); Hilldale Club (1928–1929); Lincoln Giants (1929); Brooklyn Royal Giants (1930); Baltimore Black Sox (1931); New York Black Yankees (1932–1934); New York Cubans (1935–1936); New York Black Yankees (1937–1948)

Career highlights and awards
- Negro National League strikeout leader (1939)

John Wayman Stanley (May 9, 1905 – January 1, 1959), nicknamed "Neck", was an American professional baseball pitcher from the 1920s to the 1940s in the Negro leagues.

A native of Kent County, Maryland, Stanley attended Chester High School in Chester, Pennsylvania. He spent over 20 years in the Negro leagues, making his debut in 1928 with the Bacharach Giants and Hilldale Club, and spending the majority of his career with the New York Black Yankees. In 1936, he tossed a no-hitter for the New York Cubans against the Newark Eagles at Delano-Hitch Stadium. He was part of another no-hitter against Newark in 1948, as he combined with Albert Stephens to hold the Eagles hitless for the Black Yankees at Red Wing Stadium. Stanley died in New York, New York in 1959 at age 53.
