= Albert Stephens (baseball) =

American baseball player

- Pitcher

Negro league baseball debut
- 1948, for the New York Black Yankees

Last appearance
- 1948, for the New York Black Yankees

Teams
- New York Black Yankees (1948)

Albert Stephens is an American former Negro league pitcher who played in the 1940s.

Stephens played for the New York Black Yankees in 1948. In six recorded games on the mound, he posted a 6.53 ERA over 20.2 innings.
