= Winans =

Winans may refer to:

== Gospel music group ==
- The Winans, an American gospel music quartet
- The Winans family of musicians, related to The Winans, including:
  - The family patriarch, Pop Winans (1934-2009)
  - Angie & Debbie, a duo of Winans family members
  - Benjamin "BeBe" Winans (born 1962)
  - Priscilla "CeCe" Winans (born 1964)
  - BeBe & CeCe Winans, a duo of the preceding two Winans family members
  - Deborah Joy Winans (born 1983)
  - Juan Winans (born 1981)
  - Mario Winans (born 1974)
  - Marvin Winans (born 1958)
  - Marvin Winans Jr (born 1979)
  - Ronald Winans (1956-2005)
  - Vickie Winans (born 1953)

== Ross Winans family of New Jersey ==
- Ross Winans (1796-1877), American railway engineer
- Thomas DeKay Winans (1820-1878), American railway engineer. Son of Ross Winans
- Celeste Revillon Winans (1823-1861), wife of Thomas DeKay Winans
- Ross Revillon Winans (1850-1892), American socialite. Son of Thomas DeKay Winans
- William Louis Winans (1823-1897), American railway engineer. Son of Ross Winans
- Walter W. Winans (1852-1920), American marksman. Son of William Louis Winans
- John Winans (1831-1907), U. S. representative from Wisconsin. First cousin of Ross Winans
- William Parkhurst Winans (1836-1917), American banker and historian. Distant cousin to Ross Winans
- Edwin B. Winans (1826-1894), Governor of Michigan. Distant cousin to Ross Winans
- Edwin B. Winans (1869-1947), U. S. Army general. Son of Edwin B. Winans (politician)

== Other people with the surname Winans ==
- A. D. Winans (born 1936), American poet
- Ada Winans, American opera singer who married Russian diplomat Peter Troubetzkoy
- Allan Winans (born 1995), American baseball player
- Fonville Winans (1911-1992), American photographer
- George Winans (1839-1926), member of Wisconsin state assembly
- James J. Winans (1818-1879), U. S. representative from Ohio
- Jamin Winans (born 1977) and Kiowa K. Winans, filmmakers
- R. Foster Winans (born 1948), author and former Wall Street Journal columnist
- Roswell Winans (1887-1968), U. S. Marine Corps general and Congressional Medal of Honor recipient
- Sam Winans, film and television composer
- Sarah D. Winans (1841-1915), American organizational leader
- Tydus Winans (born 1972), American football player

== Other people ==
- Charles Winans Chipp (1848-1881), American naval officer and Arctic explorer
- Gideon Winans Allen (1835–1912), member of the Wisconsin State Assembly
- Jason Irvin Winans Dozzell (born 1967), English former professional association footballer
- Lewis Winans Ross (1812-1895), U. S. representative from Illinois
- Wynant (disambiguation), a similar surname which includes Winant, Wijnants and Wynants.

== Places ==
- Mount Winans, Baltimore, a community of Baltimore, Maryland
- Winans Creek, a river in Texas

== Other ==
- United States v. Winans, a landmark U. S. Supreme Court decision
- Winans Camel, a type of steam locomotive
- Winans Cigar Ship, an innovative ship design
- Winans Steam Gun, an early machine gun
