= Wynant =

Wijnands, Wynants and variants are Dutch patronymic surnames, meaning son of Wijnand (also spelled Wijnant, Winand, and, in Afrikaans, Wynand). Among more common variant spellings in the Low Countries are Wijnands (3442 + 108), Wynants (28 + 1985), Wijnants (429 + 1143), Wynant (<5 + 554), Wijnant (38 + 268), and Wijnand (280 + 13). The form Winant is more common in the United States.

== Surname ==
People with these surnames include:

=== Wijnands ===
- Ad Wijnands (born 1959), Dutch racing cyclist
- Onno Wijnands (1945–1993), Dutch botanist

=== Wijnants ===
- Jan Wijnants (1632–1684, buried 1684), Dutch painter
- Jan Wijnants (cyclist) (born 1958), Belgian racing cyclist
- Ludwig Wijnants (born 1956), Belgian professional road bicycle racer
- Olaf Wijnants (born 1948), Dutch actor
- Sarah Wijnants (born 1999), Belgian football forward

=== Winant ===
- Carmen Winant (born 1983), American writer and visual artist
- Ethel Winant (1922–2003), American casting director and vice-president of CBS
- Howard Winant (born 1946), American sociologist and race theorist
- John Gilbert Winant (1889–1947), American politician
- Scott Winant, American television director and producer
- William Winant (born 1953), American percussionist

=== Winants ===
- Luc Winants (born 1963), Belgian chess player

=== Wynand ===
- Patrecia Wynand, stagename of Patrecia Scott (1940–1977), American model and actress
- Paul Wynand (1879–1956), German sculptor and medalist

=== Wynant ===
- H. M. Wynant (born 1927), American film and television actor

=== Wynants ===
- Dirk Wynants (born 1964), Flemish furniture designer
- Laure Wynants, Belgian epidemiologist
- Maarten Wynants (born 1982), Belgian racing cyclist
- Milton Wynants (born 1972), Uruguayan racing cyclist
- Pierre Wynants (born 1939), Belgian chef

== Given name ==
- Winant Sidle (1916–2005), major general in the United States Army
- Winant Van Winkle (1879–1943), New Jersey politician

== See also ==
- Wynants Kill, a stream in New York named after Wijnant Gerritsen van der Poel (1617–1699)
- Wilbur Wynant House, in Indiana
- Gail Wynand, character in the novel The Fountainhead
- Wijnen, a Dutch surname of similar origin
- Winans (disambiguation), a similar surname
