= Wijnen =

Wijnen or Wynen is a Dutch patronymic surname. The given name Wijn is a now rare short form of names like Boudewijn and Wijnand. The patronym has a large number of variants, including Weijnen, Wienen, Wijn, Wijne, Wijns, Wynen, and Wyns. The name Van Wijnen is possibly a toponymic surname instead, indicating an origin in Wijnen, either a former hamlet near Nistelrode in North Brabant or a Dutch name for the town Guînes in Northern France. People with these names include:

== Wijnen/Wynen ==
- Alphons Wijnen (1921–2001), Dutch East Indies Army officer and war criminal
- André Wynen (1923–2007), Belgian physician and World War II resistance fighter
- Arrienne Wynen (born 1955), Australian lawn bowler
- Martin Wijnen (born 1966), Dutch Vice Chief of Defence
- Tiemen Wijnen (born 2000), Belgian football player

== Wienen ==
- Jos Wienen (born 1960), Dutch politician, mayor of Haarlem

== Wijn ==
- Jan Wijn (1934–2022), Dutch pianist and piano pedagogue
- Joop Wijn (born 1969), Dutch politician, Minister of Economic Affairs 2006–2007
- Piet Wijn (1929–2010), Dutch comics creator
- Sander de Wijn (born 1990), Dutch field hockey player

== Wijns/Wyns ==
- David Wijns (born 1987), Belgian football defender
- François-Jean Wyns de Raucour (1779–1857), Belgian liberal politician, burgomaster of Brussels
- Lode Wyns (born c.1950), Belgian molecular biologist
- Lode Wyns (athlete) (born 1946), Belgian javelin thrower

== Van Wijnen ==
- Domenicus van Wijnen (1661–1695), Dutch allegorical painter
- Hans van Wijnen (1937–1995), Dutch volleyball player

== See also ==
- Wijnants, related patronymic surname
