= Edwin Winans =

Edwin Winans may refer to:

- Edwin B. Winans (soldier) (1869–1947), U.S. Army general
- Edwin B. Winans (politician) (1826–1894), governor of Michigan

== See also ==
- Winans (disambiguation)
