= Carrie Murray Nature Center =

Nature center in Baltimore, Maryland, US

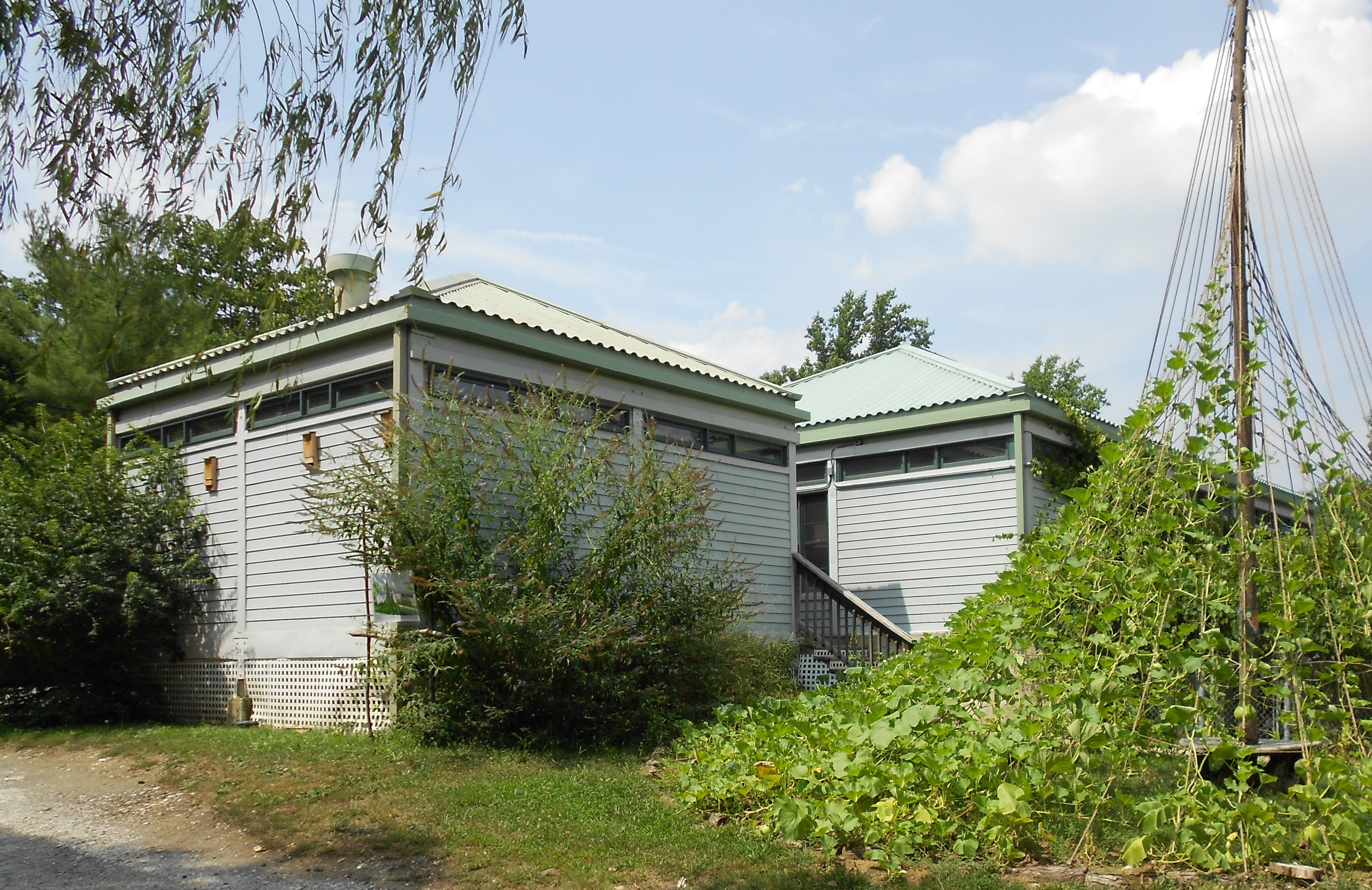
- Interactive map of Carrie Murray Nature Center
- Type: Nature Center
- Location: 1901 Ridgetop Road; Baltimore, Maryland 21207
- Coordinates: 39°18′25.98″N 76°41′44.11″W
- Created: 1985
- Operator: Baltimore City Recreation and Parks
- Website: carriemurraynaturecenter.org

Carrie Murray Nature Center (CMNC) is operated by Baltimore City Recreation and Parks. CMNC offers environmental education programs for children, families, and adults as Baltimore City's only nature center. A native live animal collection, outdoor bird aviary, and indoor exhibits are features of the center, which is nestled in the expansive and historic Gwynns Falls/Leakin Park, the largest urban forested park east of the Mississippi River.

The nature center serves an estimated 30,000 visitors annually, including individuals and families as well as groups from schools, faith-based groups, recreation centers, and camps. During the school year, the nature center offers field trips and outreach programs for students of all ages, including the Forest Preschool at Carrie Murray Nature Center, a forest immersion program for preschool-age children. The nature center also offers summer camps, public programs, special events, and volunteer opportunities.

== Background ==
Baltimore City Recreation and Parks (BCRP) established the nature center after receiving a generous donation from former Baltimore Orioles baseball hall-of-famer Eddie Murray. The center was dedicated in 1985 and was named after Eddie's mother, Carrie Murray.
