= Gwynns Falls/Leakin Park =

Park in Baltimore, Maryland, United States

Leakin Park
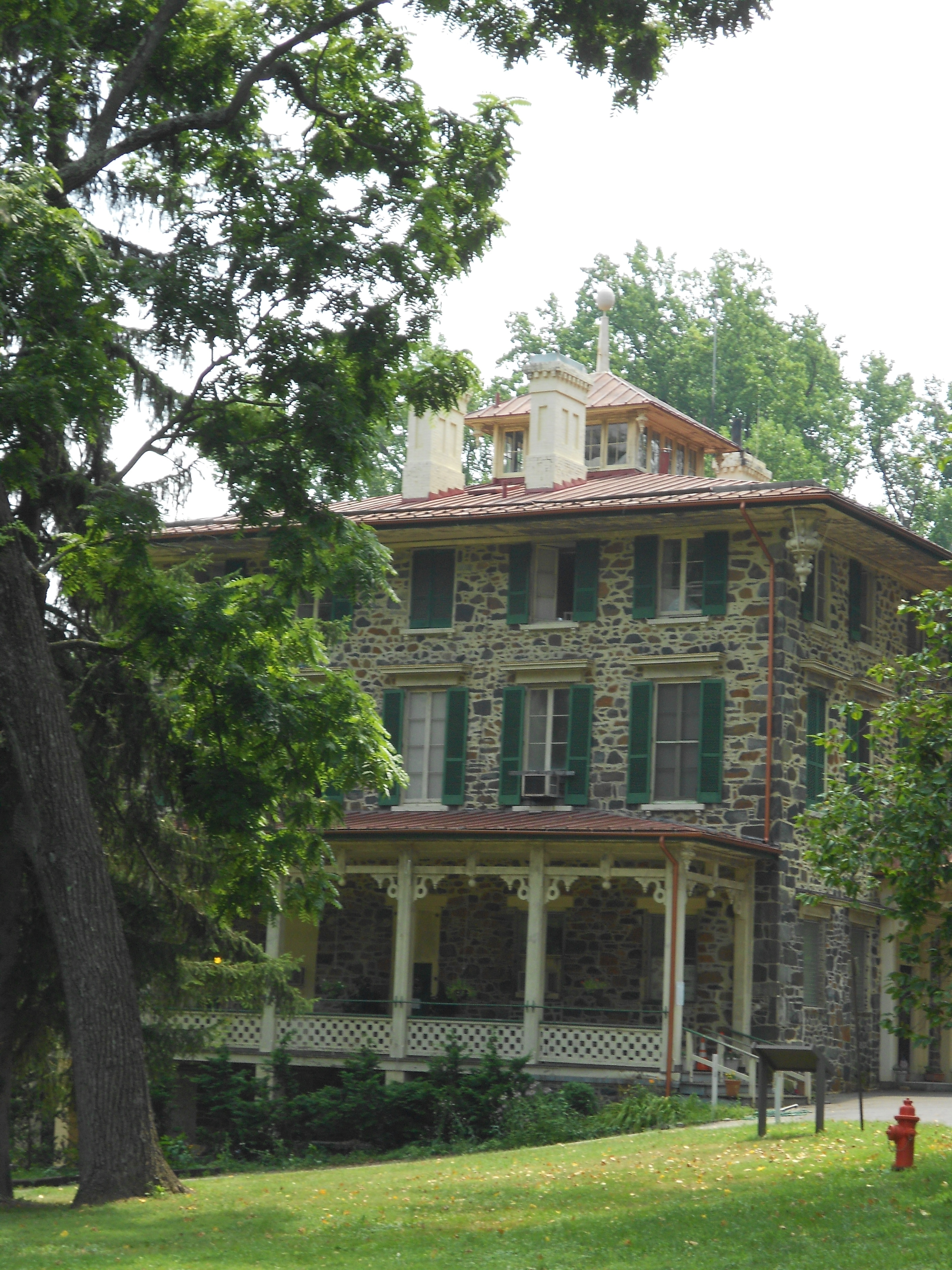
- Orianda Mansion ("Crimea") in Leakin Park
- Interactive map of Leakin Park
- Location: 4921 Windsor Mill Road; Baltimore, MD, 21207
- Coordinates: 39°18′23″N 76°41′27″W
- Area: 1,216 acres (492 ha)
- Created: 1908
- Operator: Baltimore City Department of Recreation & Parks
- Website: bcrp.baltimorecity.gov/parks/gwynns-falls

Gwynns Falls/Leakin Park is a park in Baltimore, Maryland, constituting a contiguous area of 1,216 acres (492 ha). It was envisioned as a "stream valley park" to protect Baltimore's watersheds, including the Gwynns Falls, from overdevelopment and to preserve their natural habitats. It is well known for the fact that over 75 bodies have been discovered in the park since the 1940s. It is also home to the Baltimore Herb Festival.

Leakin Park, designated as part of the Baltimore National Heritage Area, is managed and maintained by the Baltimore City Department of Recreation and Parks, assisted and supported by volunteers.

== Overview ==
The park incorporates the valleys of the Gwynns Falls and its tributaries, extending more than six miles (9.7 km) from the western municipal limits south to Wilkens Avenue. Along its borders are 20 of the city's neighborhoods. An 1831 traveler expressed surprise at discovering the valley's "wild and beautiful scenery [...] so near the city, surrounded by all the various majestic features of a rocky mountainous country."

Leakin Park contains the former country estate of Thomas Winans, a Baltimore native and son of railroad pioneer Ross Winans. His estate was originally named Orianda, but is now known as the Crimea Mansion.

== Outdoor recreation ==
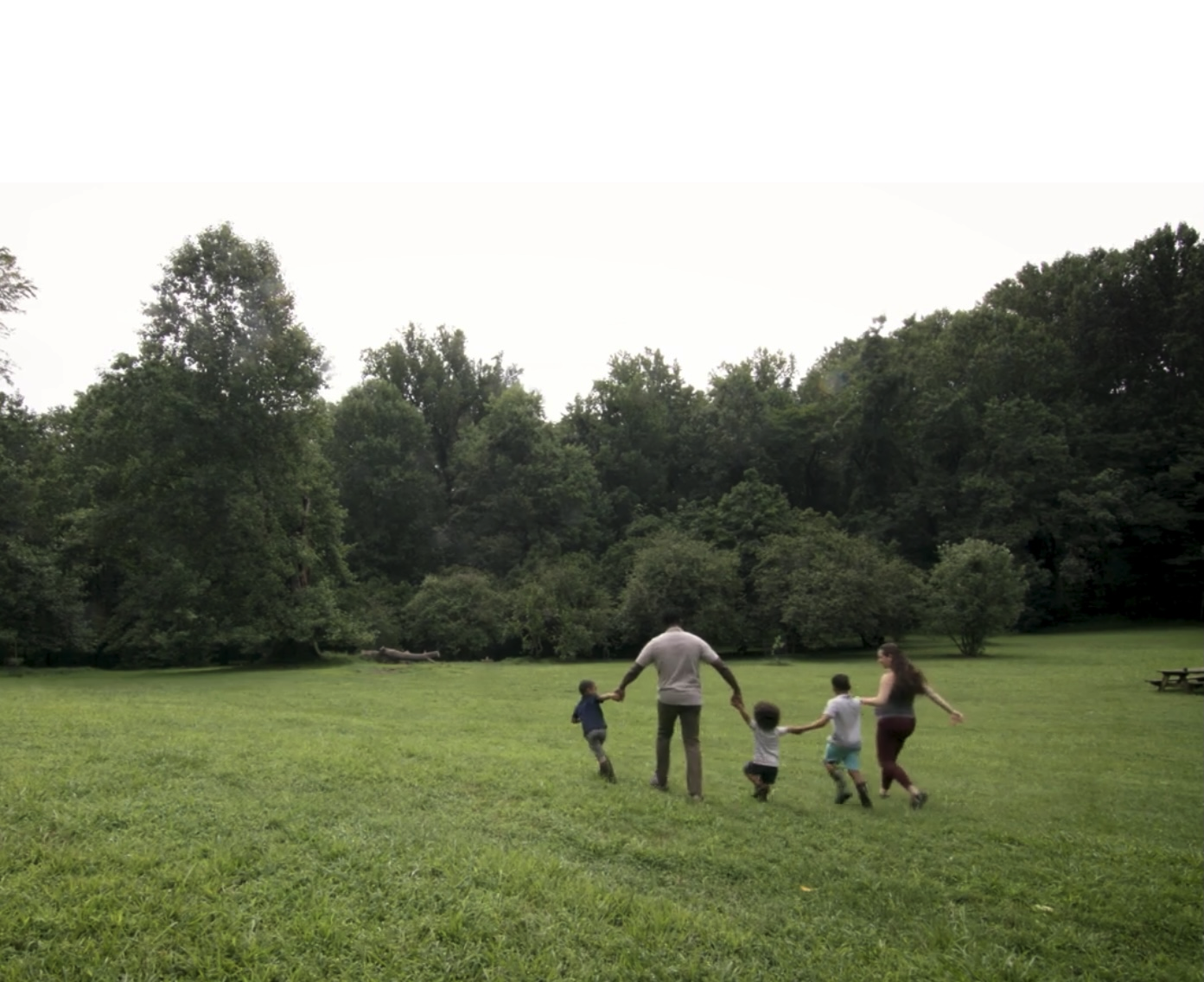
A family walking through a meadow at Leakin Park

=== The Crimea Section ===
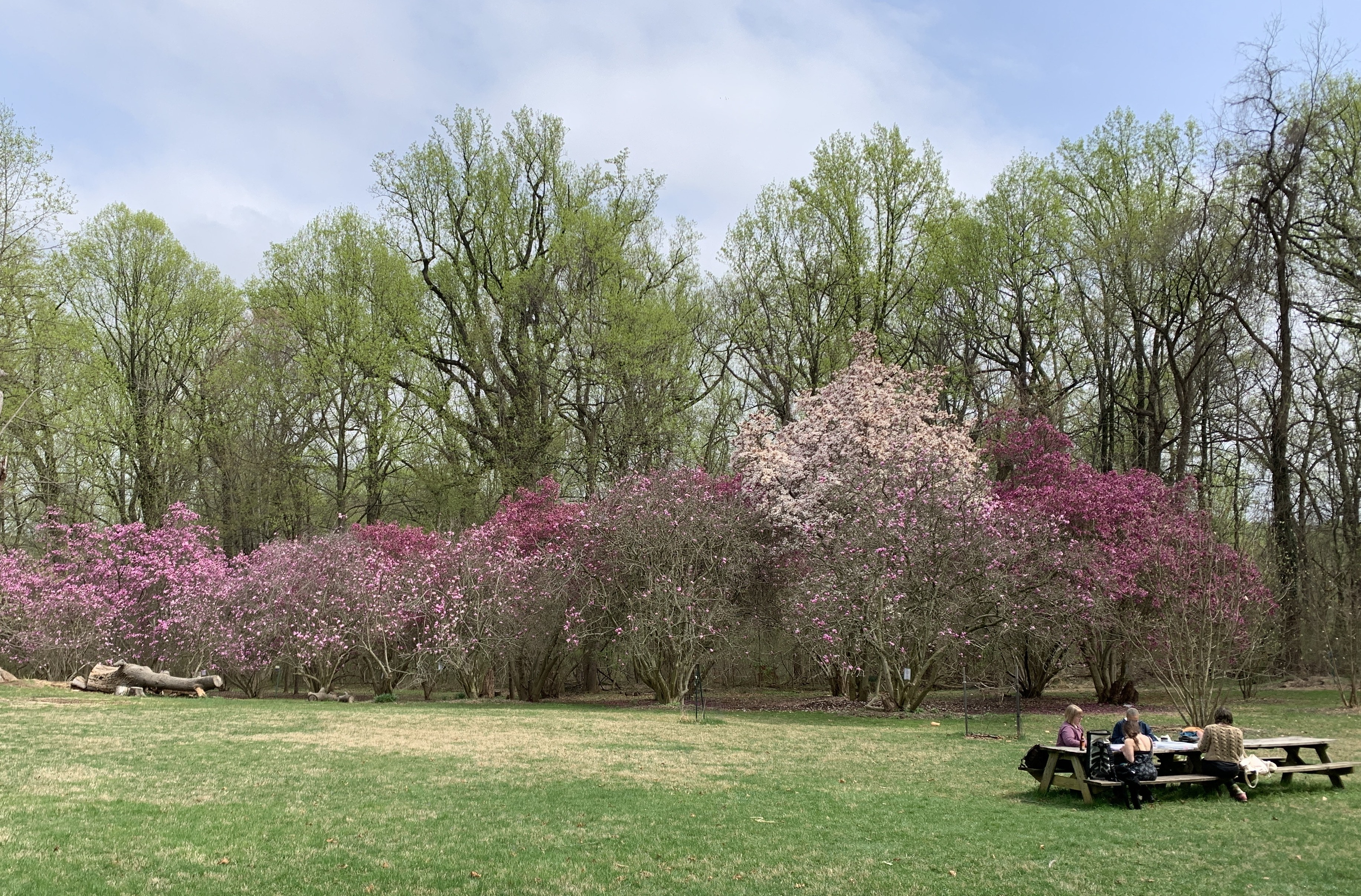
People meeting in the blooming Magnolia Grove

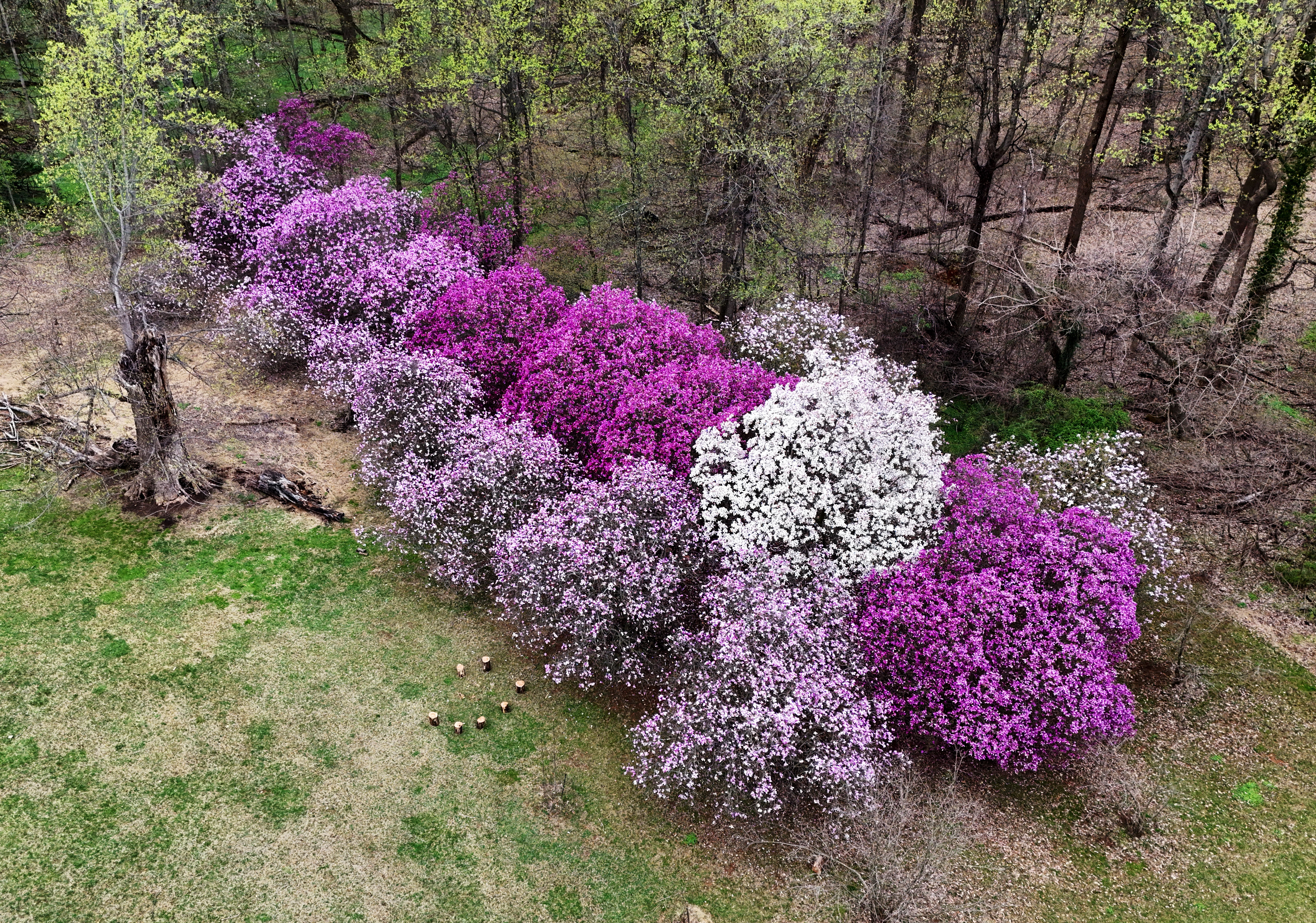
The Magnolia Grove in bloom, seen from above

The Eagle Drive entrance to the park provides access to railroad-themed park amenities: the historic structures of railroad builder Thomas Winans, as well as such family activities as miniature train rides and a railroad playground. Features from the Winans Crimea Estate era include the stone Orianda mansion and the Carpenters Gothic Winans Chapel—both on the city's list of historic landmarks.

Facilities in this section include the headquarters of the Chesapeake Bay Outward Bound School, with its outdoor activities programs, the Carrie Murray Nature Center. Active recreation sections include tennis courts and access to woodland trails. Saucer magnolias (Magnolia × soulangeana) and sweetbay magnolias (Magnolia virginiana) can be found here.

=== Winans Meadow ===
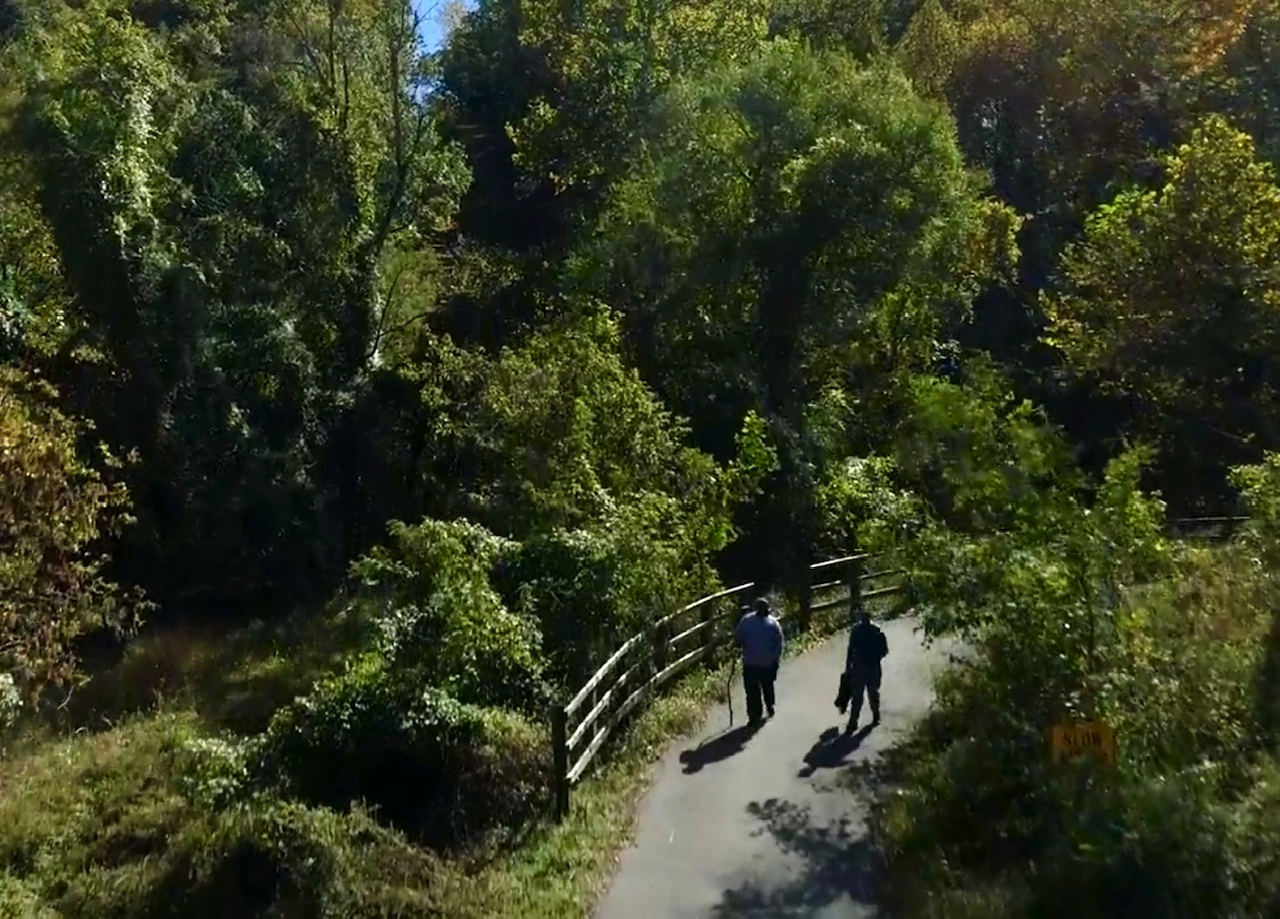
People walking the Gwynns Falls Trail

The Gwynns Falls Trail extends the length of Leakin Park from the terminus of Interstate 70 (I-70) to Wilkens Avenue, in the Winans Meadow section. Constructed in stages from 1999 to 2008, the trail opened the stream valley to active recreational use for hikers and bikers, with trailheads and provision for parking along the route. The project also contributed new playfields that were designated "Leon Day Park," in honor of Baltimore's Leon Day. There are approximately 18 identified hiking trails in Leakin Park. Most of the trails are in the Winans Meadow and Crimea areas of the park.

== History ==
=== Establishing the parks: the Olmsted role ===
Leakin Park traces its earliest history to a small tract near Edmondson and Hilton avenues, designated in 1901 as the Gwynns Falls Reserve. In 1904, as the city anticipated expanding its borders through annexation, the highly regarded Olmsted Brothers firm proposed creating "stream valley parks" to protect distinctive watersheds like the Gwynns Falls from future development and secure them as natural preserves. Over the next decades, the Olmsteds worked with the city in its acquisition of park land extending to Windsor Mill Road.

In 1926, following the 1918 annexation, the city again commissioned the Olmsteds for a study of park needs. This report recommended extending Gwynns Falls Park northward along the stream to the city boundary. It also urged acquiring the valley of a tributary, the Dead Run.

In 1939, a request to rename the park in the name of a former city mayor was made. The Winans Estate was purchased for the park in the 1940s, and it was officially renamed Leakin Park in the decade as well.

=== Expressway threat ===
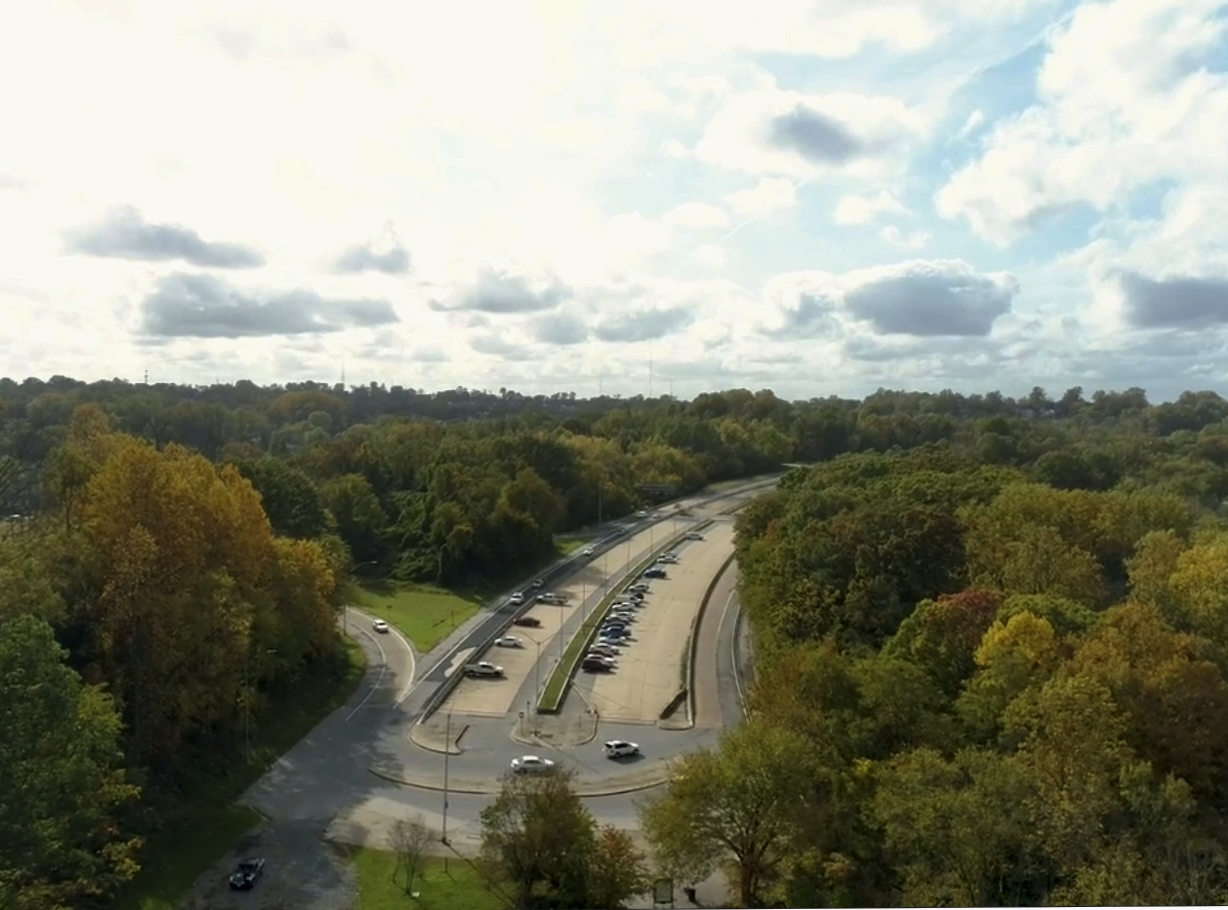
I-70 park and ride seen from above in the direction of I-695

Leakin Park was threatened in 1971 when funding for the federal Interstate Highway System introduced plans to create a highway through the park. As plans for the road developed, community activists organized in opposition. A group committed to protecting the parks took the name of Volunteers Opposed to Leakin Park Expressway (VOLPE). Taking their opposition to court, VOLPE won a partial victory in 1972 when it was ruled that provision for hearings on the park route had been "legally insufficient," and ordered any future plans to take in full consideration of the environmental impact they might pose. By 1980, city officials had decided to abandon the proposed route through the park.

=== Pipeline controversy ===
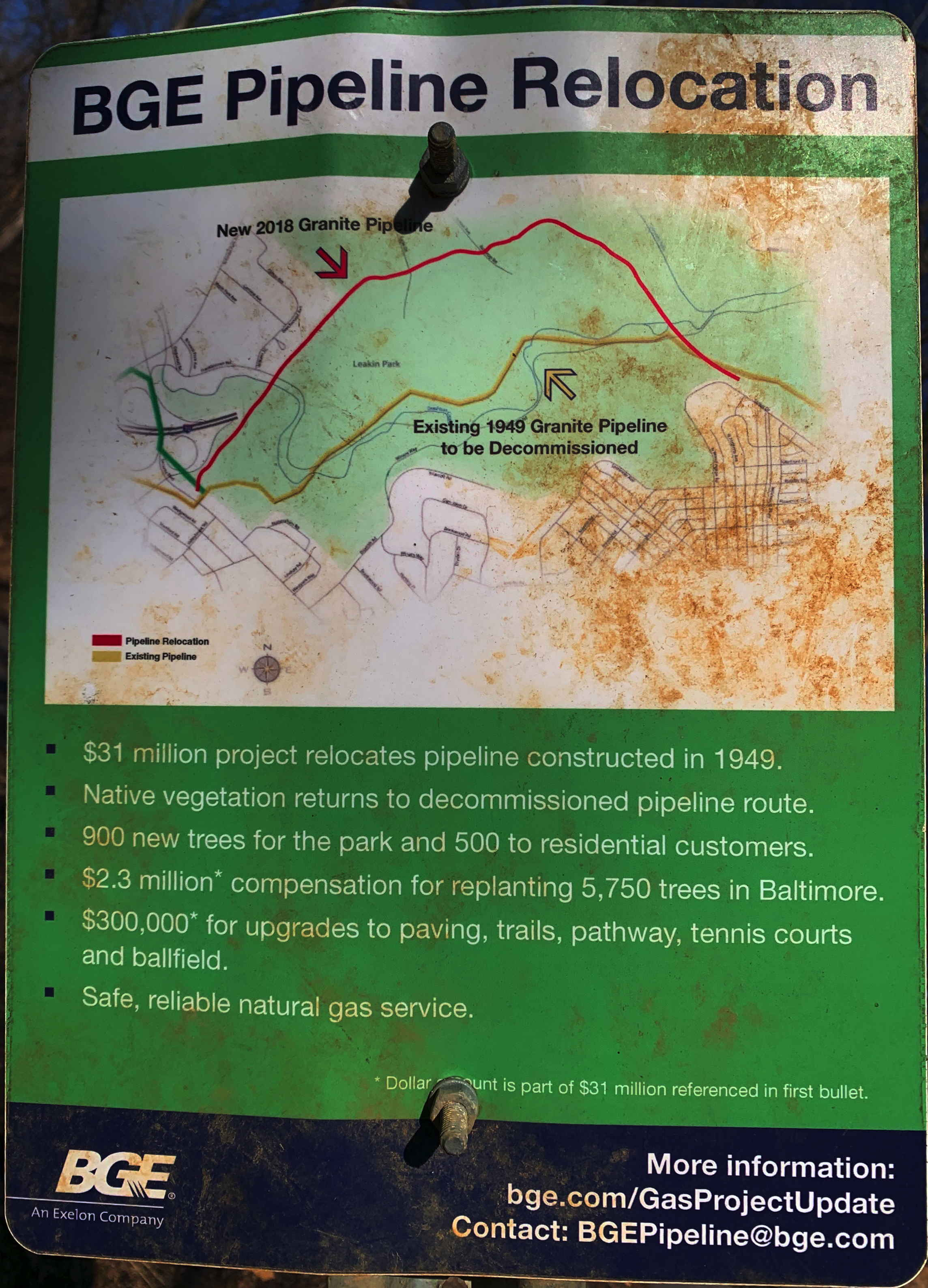
A sign explaining the BGE gas pipeline relocation. The map shows the new and old pipeline routes through the park.

In 2013, a Baltimore Gas and Electric (BGE) plan to run a new natural gas pipeline for a two-mile (3.2 km) distance through the park was made public. This line threatened a substantial number of the park's trees. BGE spokespersons explained the new line would replace an original one installed with park department permission in 1949, which was now facing considerable maintenance problems. However, a new line could not follow the existing route due to current environmental regulations protecting wetlands, so the proposed new route would run along the ridge near the southern border of the park. In an editorial on the controversy, The Baltimore Sun insisted that "BGE must work with the city and other stakeholders to find the least damaging route for a new gas line through the area." In response to the concerns raised, BGE agreed to consider an alternative northerly route through the park, following existing park roads, minimizing tree loss, and impacting fewer residences by its proximity to them. After four years of dialogue and studies of route feasibility, BGE began construction along the alternative route in 2018, completing the work in the autumn of 2019. Following completion, 870 replacement trees were planted along edges of the corridor.

=== Body disposals ===
More than 75 deceased individuals were identified, scattered throughout the park, between 1946 and 2017. Most incidents were recorded as murders in the Baltimore Sun and Baltimore City Paper. Easy access to the park made it a convenient disposal site for murders "that happened, often, not in the park but near it."

Leakin Park has garnered a negative reputation as a place where the remains of local suicide and murder victims are often found. Because of this association, the park began to be morbidly called by locals "the city's largest unregistered graveyard" and "Baltimore's largest open-air cemetery". In 2011, the Baltimore City Department of Recreation and Parks led efforts to change the park's reputation with the closure of dead-end access roads.
