= Laure Wynants =

Belgian epidemiologist and academic

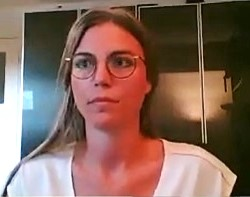
- Wynants in 2020
- Education: KU Leuven
- Scientific career
- Workplaces: KU Leuven; Maastricht University
- Thesis: Clinical Risk Prediction Models Based On Multicenter Data (2016)

Laure Wynants is a Belgian epidemiologist who is a professor at Maastricht University. She studies prediction models in medicine and hospital acquired infections.

== Early life and education ==
Wynants studied biostatistics at KU Leuven in Belgium. She remained there for her doctoral research, where she focused on prediction models. Her doctorate sought to predict whether ovarian tumours are benign or malignant, and how likely it is that the insertion of a catheter will cause bloodstream infection.

== Research and career ==
Wynants is an assistant professor at KU Leuven. She has focused on gynaecological cancers and hospital-acquired infections. She develops prediction models, models which combine a broad range of patient characteristics to understand individual probabilities of suffering from a certain disease.

In the early days of the COVID-19 pandemic, Wynants became concerned about the lack of scientific rigour applied to decision-making in COVID-19. She was particularly interested in translating her understanding of prediction models to better anticipate the outcomes of patients with COVID-19, for example, whether prediction models could help to identify which patients should be tested, determine whether patients could recover at home, or understand who needed to be taken to critical care. Despite considerable investment into artificial intelligence tools, machine-learning algorithms failed to bring support to physicians on the front-lines. She argued that poor-quality, mislabeled data and data from unknown sources resulted in mediocre tools. Wynants eventually established a consortium to understand COVID-19. Specifically, she created a living review to collate information on COVID-19 from published research and translate it into clinical practise.

In 2020, Wynants was awarded the Edmond Hustinx Prize by Maastricht University. In 2022, Significance named Wynants as among ten women statisticians who helped the world to understand COVID-19.

== Selected publications ==
- Laure Wynants; Ben Van Calster; Marc J. M. Bonten; et al. (7 April 2020). "Prediction models for diagnosis and prognosis of covid-19 infection: systematic review and critical appraisal". The BMJ. 369 m1328. doi:10.1136/bmj.m1328. ISSN 0959-8138. PMC 7222643. PMID 32265220. Wikidata Q91706587.
- Ben Van Calster; David J. McLernon; Maarten van Smeden; Laure Wynants; Ewout W. Steyerberg; Topic Group ‘Evaluating diagnostic tests and prediction models’ of the STRATOS initiative (16 December 2019). "Calibration: the Achilles heel of predictive analytics". BMC Medicine. 17 (1): 230. doi:10.1186/s12916-019-1466-7. ISSN 1741-7015. PMC 6912996. PMID 31842878. Wikidata Q92016724.
- Ben Van Calster; Laure Wynants; Jan Verbeek; Jan Y Verbakel; Evangelia Christodoulou; Andrew J Vickers; Monique J. Roobol; Ewout W Steyerberg (19 September 2018). "Reporting and Interpreting Decision Curve Analysis: A Guide for Investigators". European Urology. 74 (6): 796–804. doi:10.1016/j.eururo.2018.08.038. ISSN 0302-2838. PMC 6261531. PMID 30241973. Wikidata Q62673865.
