= Celeste Revillon Winans =

American philanthropist

Celeste Marguerite Louise Revillon Winans
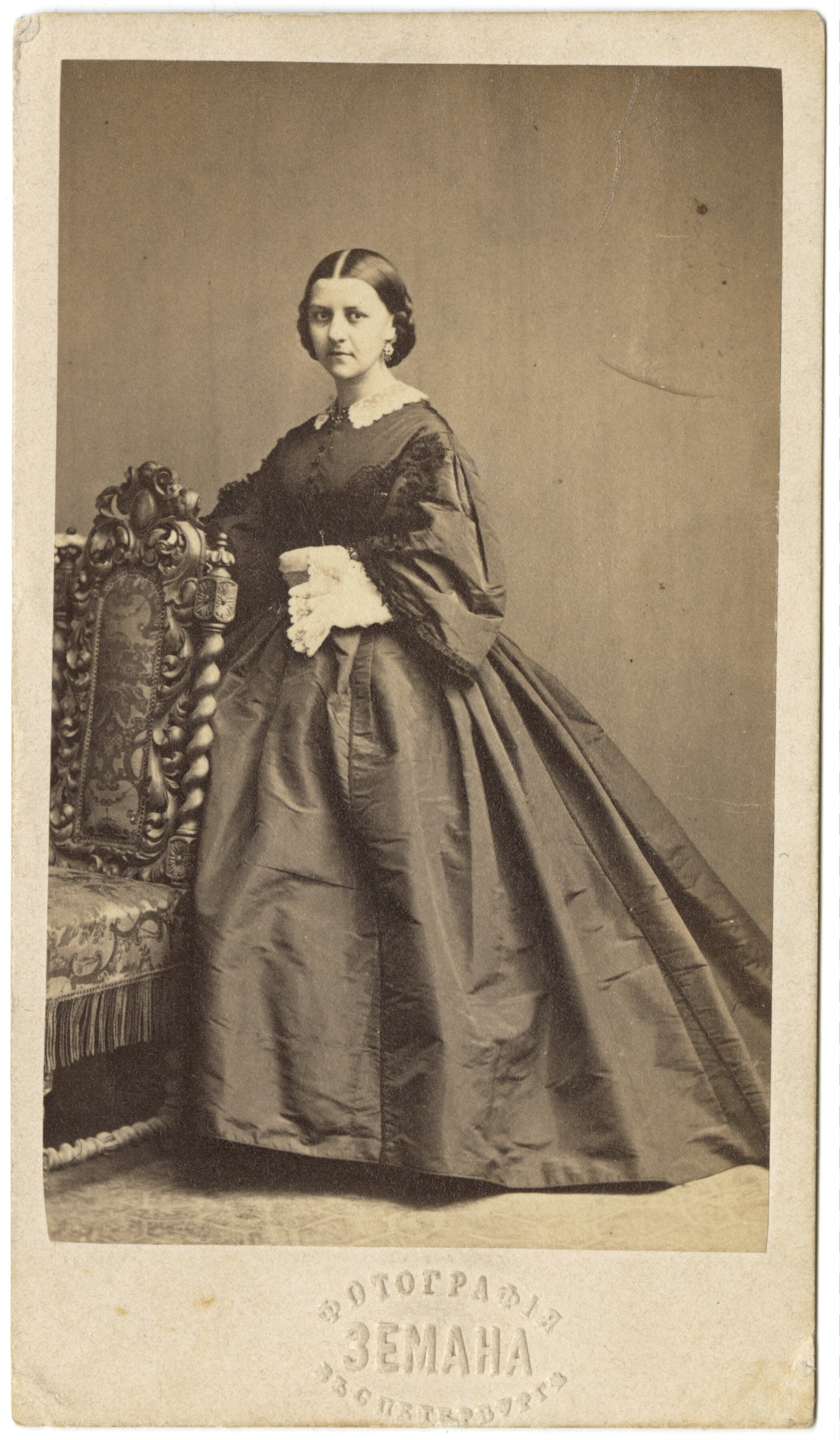
- Born: Celeste Marguerite Louise Revillon; 1823
- Died: March 19, 1861, age 38; Baltimore, Maryland
- Burial place: Green Mount Cemetery
- Occupation: Philanthropist
- Years active: 1854–1861
- Known for: Charitable giving
- Spouse: Thomas DeKay Winans (married August 23, 1847)
- Children: 4
- Parent(s): George and Marguerite Louise Bonjour Revillon
- Relatives: Ross Winans (father in law); William Winans (brother in law); Ross Revillon (son); Walter W. Winans (nephew)

Celeste Marguerite Louise Revillon Winans (1823 – March 19, 1861) was an American philanthropist from Maryland. Winans operated a well known and large soup kitchen in Baltimore, operating it until her death in 1861. In 2021, she was named to the Maryland Women's Hall of Fame.

== Biography ==
=== Early life ===
Celeste Marguerite Louise Revillon was born in 1823. She was the first daughter of George and Marguerite Louise Bonjour Revillon, who would have a family of eleven children. She had French and Italian ancestry and grew up in Saint Petersburg, Russia. George Revillon was a prominent engraver and also owned a ship caulking business.

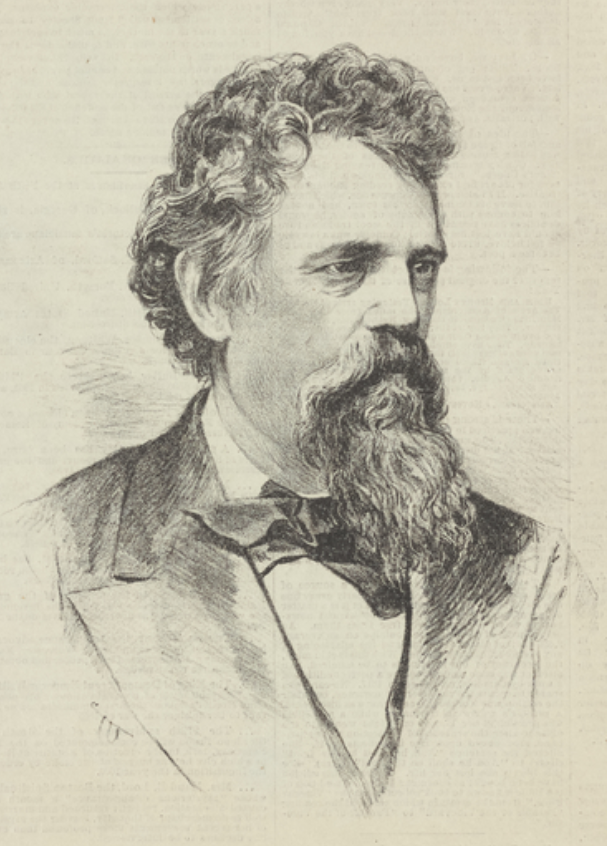
Thomas DeKay Winans, Celeste's husband

=== Marriage ===
Celeste Marguerite Louise Revillion married Thomas DeKay Winans in Saint Petersburg on August 23, 1847. Winans was an engineer and inventor, the son and the heir of Ross Winans, a wealthy railroad engineer. Thomas Winans met Celeste when he travelled to Russia with his brother and George Washington Whistler to oversee his father's railroad projects in the country. The couple moved to Baltimore, Maryland in 1850. In Baltimore, Thomas Winans built a magnificent estate, Alexandroffsky on West Baltimore Street at Freemont Avenue inspired by the towns in Russia he had visited when overseeing his railroad work. Celeste and Thomas would have four children, George (born 1849); Ross Revillon (born 1850); William George (born 1852) and Celeste Marguerite Winans (born 1855).

=== Charity ===
On June 15, 1854, Celeste Winans encouraged her husband to purchase the German Evangelical Reformed Church across the street from their estate to be used as a soup kitchen for the needy. Celeste Winans would serve between 600 and 4,000 meals daily for needy residents of Baltimore. Her charity was recognized throughout the city. This was in an era before formal government relief (welfare programs) and charity for the needy was typically the domain of wealthy individuals and local charity groups, often supported by religious denominations who were also missionaries. The Winans also provided rooming, and even built neighborhood housing for working class people.

=== Death and legacy ===
On March 19, 1861, Celeste Revillon Winans died at the age of 38, several days after giving birth to a stillborn baby. Her husband continued to run the soup kitchen in her honor after her death. She was buried in Green Mount Cemetery.

For her contributions as a philanthropist to the city of Baltimore, she was named to the Maryland Women's Hall of Fame in 2021.
