= Ross Revillon Winans =

Gilded age socialite

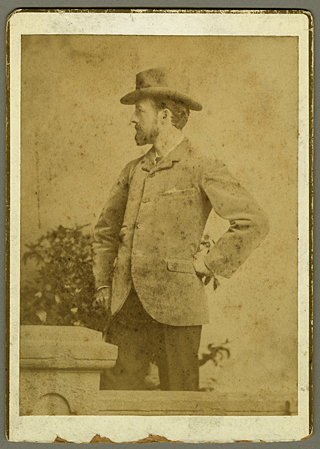
Ross Revillon Winans (1886). Heir to a railway fortune at age 28, he was a Gilded Age "gentleman of leisure".

Ross Revillon Winans (June 8, 1850 - April 25, 1912) was a Baltimore, Maryland heir of a railway fortune. His father and grandfather were famous railroad innovators and entrepreneurs. He is best remembered today as a Gilded Age heir and socialite, the builder of a magnificent house in Baltimore, and for his controversial will.

== Early life ==
The Winans family fortune began with Ross R.'s grandfather, Ross Winans, a pioneering train mechanic and inventor. A key figure in early railroading, he designed numerous innovations for the Baltimore and Ohio Railroad, including the first successful coal-burning freight locomotives and the eight-wheeled rail car system, which allowed cars to navigate tight turns. This invention, featuring swivel trucks on four-wheel cars, remains in use today.

In 1843, Ross Winans sent his sons, Thomas DeKay Winans and William Louis Winans, to Russia. They were tasked with engineering the first major Russian railroad line between St. Petersburg and Moscow. The initial five-year, $5 million project to build the line led to an even more lucrative contract to build and maintain all the rolling stock. This maintenance agreement, paying per car and per mile traveled, became so profitable that the Russian government eventually paid an additional $8 million to buy out the remainder of its terms.

During his time in Russia, Thomas DeKay Winans married Celeste Revillon Winans in 1847. She was a Russian national of French and Italian ancestry. Their first child, Ross Revillon Winans, was born in St. Petersburg in 1850.

The family returned to the United States in 1851 and established themselves in Baltimore. Thomas Winans constructed a large and eccentric city mansion named "Alexandroffsky" in tribute to the Czar, and a thousand-acre summer estate in West Baltimore called "Crimea".

The Alexandroffsky estate contained many inventions, including automated devices, unique heating systems, and workshops that so amazed a visiting Mark Twain in 1877 that he documented it in a detailed 32-page letter to his wife.

Beyond their railroad empire, the Winans family also devised a "cigar boat" that never really worked, but it was the inspiration for Nemo's submarine in Twenty Thousand Leagues Under the Seas. Thomas Winans and his wife were also known for philanthropy, establishing a soup kitchen in Baltimore that fed as many as four thousand people daily during the American Civil War.

Ross R. Winans graduated from Oxford University. When his father Thomas died in 1878, the 28-year-old Ross inherited an estate worth more than $20 million.

== Adult years ==
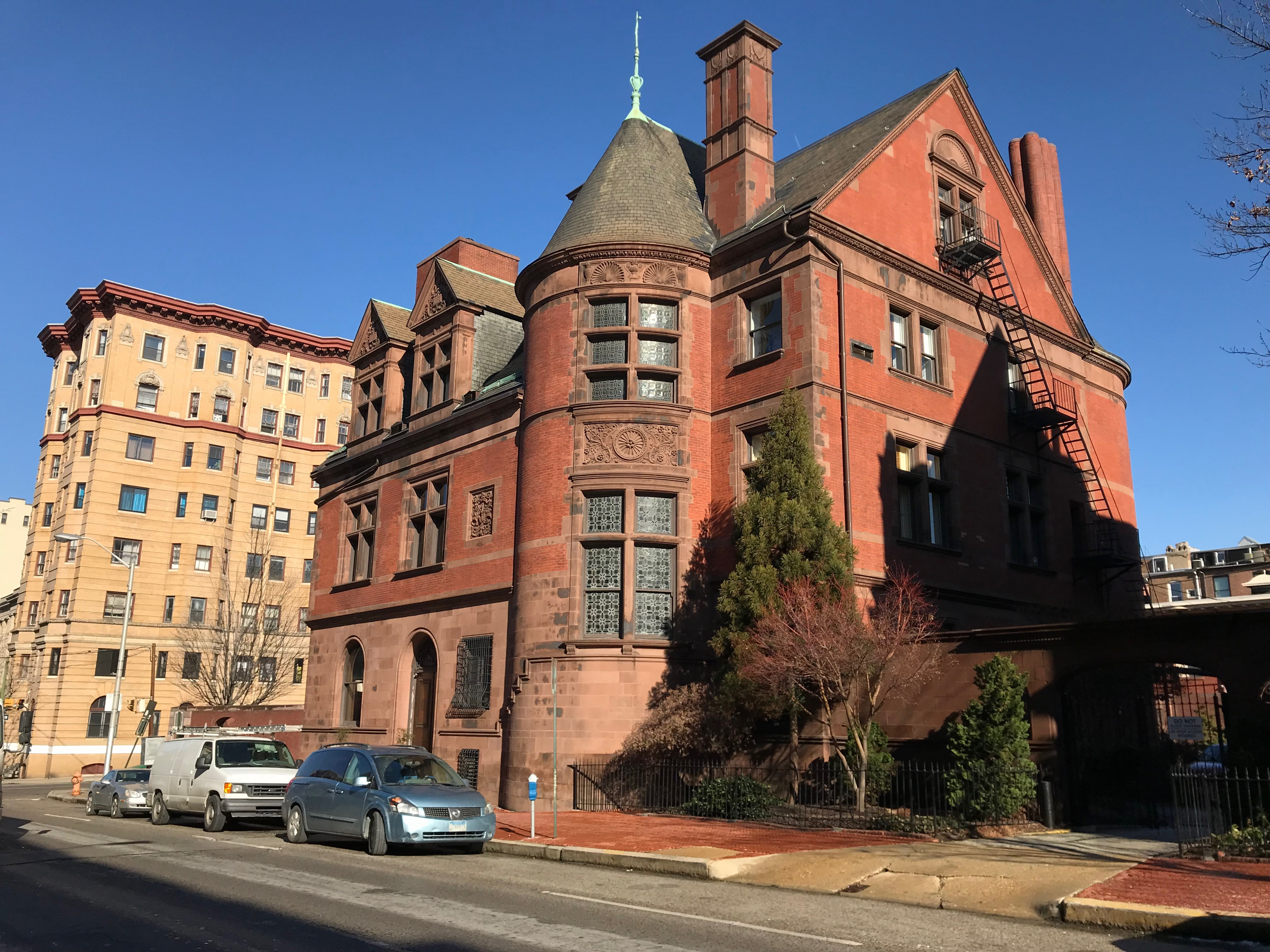
The imposing battlement of the Ross Mansion, built by McKim, Mead & White, is still standing. It was known as the "House of Mystery" to locals.

As the heir to an immense fortune, Ross R. Winans lived the life of a gentleman of leisure. In 1879, one year after his inheritance, he married his first cousin, Neva Whistler, whose half-brother was the famed artist James Abbott McNeill Whistler. The couple spent much of their time in Europe and at their summer cottage 'Bleak House' in Newport, Rhode Island, which was situated next to his father's estate. He was an early sponsor of the excavation of the Roman fort at Saalburg, Germany, and was rewarded by Emperor Wilhelm I with the gift of a painting.

In 1882, Winans commissioned the New York architectural firm of McKim, Mead & White to design a bespoke residence in Baltimore. The project, one of the firm's first domestic commissions, was overseen by principal designer Stanford White, with a young Cass Gilbert serving as the on-site clerk-of-the-works. The resulting mansion at 1217 St. Paul Street cost $500,000 to build.

The house was designed in the Château style. Built of exterior red brick and brownstone, the 46-room mansion was distinguished by its twin towers with sharp conical roofs, a steeply pitched main roof, and deep-set windows. A high wall surrounded the property, giving it a forbidding appearance. The entrance hall featured a fireplace surrounded by Persian blue tiles, while other rooms had mantels of oak, mahogany, alabaster, and marble. A large oak staircase with twisted spindles was illuminated by lead glass windows. Details included pierced copper panels on the dining-room sideboard and a massive safe door in Winans's study decorated with twin sunbursts made of bronze upholstery nails. For years, the Winans entertained frequently, and the mansion, with its flexible ground-floor plan and disappearing pocket doors, was often filled with guests. This period marked the height of Ross R. Winans's life as a prominent socialite, before a series of devastating events changed the course of his life.

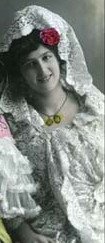
Victoria Delgado, a Spanish flamenco dancer, eloped away with Winans' son against his wishes.

Tragedy struck the family in 1907. Within a span of just six months, Winans's wife, Neva, his son, William, and his daughter, Beatrice, all died. This succession of deaths sent him into a spiral of grief. His relationship with his remaining family members soured in the aftermath. His daughter, Beatrice, had married French Prince Henri de Bearn in Paris in 1905, at which time Winans had given her $300,000 in bonds. Upon her death in 1907, Beatrice willed the entire sum to her husband, a decision that disregarded their two infant children. Winans became embroiled in a bitter legal battle with his son-in-law. He attempted to prevent the Prince from claiming the entire inheritance, arguing that French law, which protected the children's share, should apply. However, the Prince sued in Maryland, arguing that the court was unaware of his wife's original intent. In 1909, the Maryland Court of Appeals found in the Prince's favor, granting him control of the entire $300,000 and deepening the rift with his father-in-law.

At the same time, Winans fell out with his surviving son, Thomas George Winans. As Ross R. was arranging to transport the bodies of his wife and children from Europe back to Baltimore, Thomas was meant to accompany him. However, at the last minute, Thomas disembarked the ship to elope with Spanish flamenco dancer Victoria Delgado, sister of the famous dancer Anita Delgado, and disappeared. The father-son relationship reportedly never fully healed. Thomas had one daughter in 1908, but he soon left Victoria for an Italian mistress; they had a son in 1910. However, his father encouraged him to return to his wife, Victoria, and by 1912 Thomas was reportedly living with her again in Spain.

Shattered by family deaths, disputes, and losses, Winans returned to his Baltimore mansion and became a recluse; rarely seen or heard from, he found solace in books. It was during this period of isolation that his grand home on St. Paul Street became known to locals as the "House of Mystery."

One of the few times he emerged from his seclusion was in November 1910. Bedridden and ill, Winans read that the famed French aviator, Hubert Latham, was planning a flight over Baltimore; it was the first time a plane ever flew over the city, it was a major local event as schools and businesses closed to watch their first view of an airplane. Winans placed a letter in The Baltimore Sun offering Latham an additional $500 prize if he would alter his flight path to circumnavigate the mansion. Winans wanted to witness the "most remarkable scientific triumph of the present age" from his bedroom window. Latham accepted the offer. On November 7, 1910, during his 42-minute flight over the city, he maneuvered his Antoinette monoplane into a low circle around 1217 St. Paul Street, giving the reclusive millionaire a close-up view of the spectacle. His grandfather ushered in a new transportation revolution: the railroad. His grandson lived long enough to see the beginning of a new revolution: powered flight.

== Death and contentious will ==
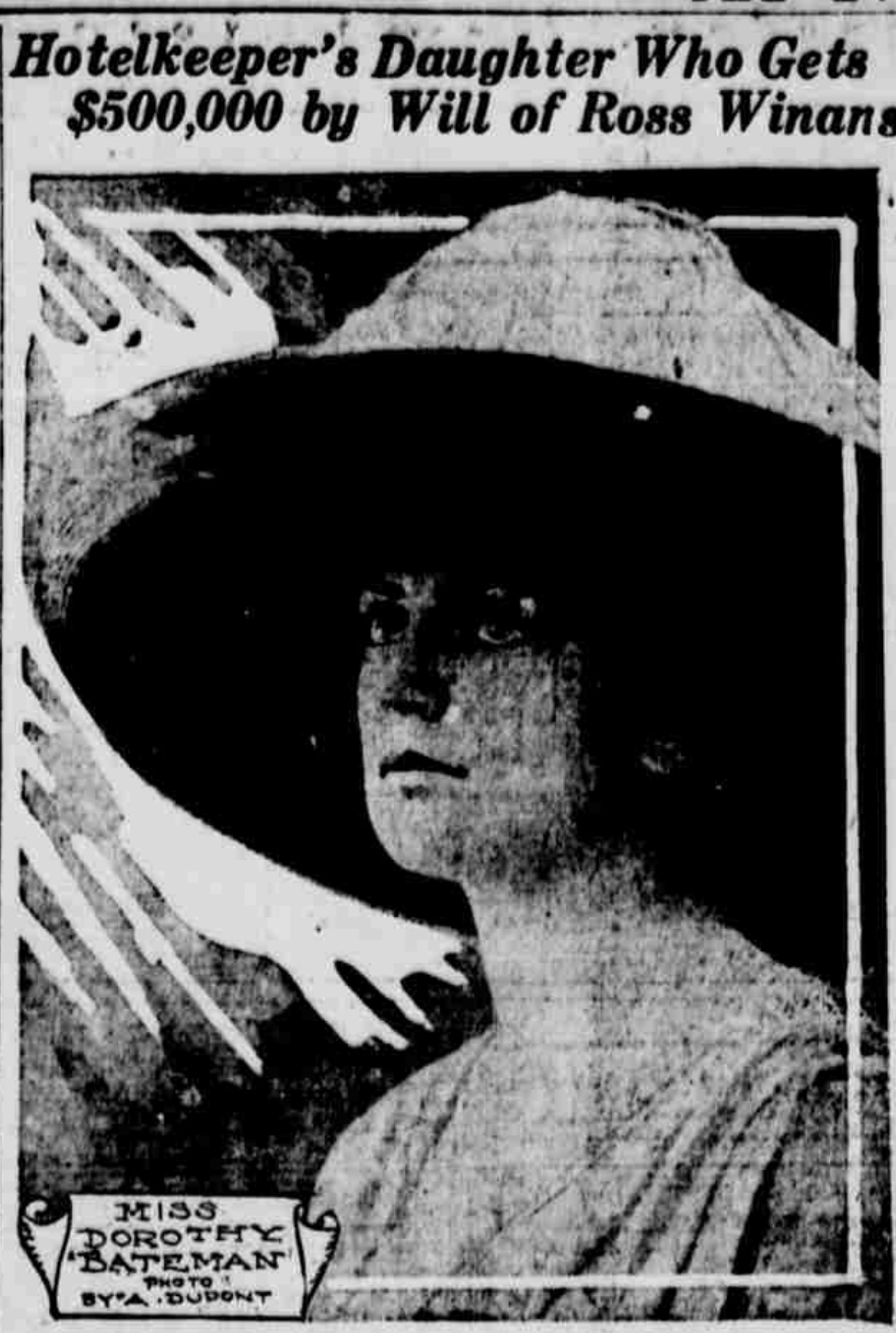
Dorothy Bateman, the housekeeper who unexpectedly inherited a large estate from Ross Winans.

Ross Revillon Winans died on April 25, 1912, at the age 61, at his St. Paul Street home. He succumbed to pneumonia after a four-day illness. His death came only five years after the family tragedies that had led him to become a recluse. He was buried in Green Mount Cemetery.

The publication of his will immediately created controversy. From an estate valued between $2.5 million and $4 million, the most surprising provision was a bequest of $500,000 to Dorothy Bateman of Newport. According to Winans, she was a little girl who gave him flowers on the beach at his Rhode Island beach house years ago; as she grew older, she continued to be friendly to him through Winans' last years. She also may have been his housekeeper. She received one of the largest single shares of the fortune. His estranged son, Thomas George Winans, was left only the income from a $200,000 trust fund. Furthermore, Thomas's own children would not receive any of the principal from that fund until after their father's death.

The will reflected the family problems of his final years. Winans made no provision for his two French grandchildren. This disinheritance of the children of his late daughter was on the surface surprising since he was said to have once been very fond of them. However, it was rebuke of his son-in-law, Prince Henri de Bearn. The Prince's lawyer questioned the will's validity, stating it was odd that the infant grandchildren were ignored while "elderly relatives and lawyers... who were [nearby Ross]" were named as beneficiaries. He implied that those with access to Ross had undue influence, while the Prince and his children were abroad and unaware of the situation.

To avoid a difficult public court battle that would necessitate challenging Winans's state of mind, the beneficiaries came to a private agreement. In a settlement filed in November 1912, they voluntarily gave up $500,000 of their own inheritance to establish a trust for the disinherited de Bearn children. The bulk was given by some minor beneficiaries, and Dorothy Bateman. The settlement ensured that the grandchildren Winans had cut out of his will fared better than those he had included. The de Bearn children received a substantial fund, while Thomas Winans's children were left with only a future claim on a smaller trust.
