= Ewout W. Steyerberg =

Dutch biostatistician

- Born: July 26, 1967 (age 59); Delft
- Education: Leiden University
- Scientific career
- Fields: Medicine, Statistics
- Workplaces: Leiden University Medical Center, Erasmus MC

Ewout W. Steyerberg (born July 26, 1967 in Delft) is a professor of clinical biostatistics and medical decision making and the medical scientific division manager at the Julius Center for Health Sciences and Primary Care at University Medical Center Utrecht. Before, he was a professor at Leiden University Medical Center and at Erasmus MC. He is interested in a wide range of statistical methods for medical research, but is mainly known for his seminal work on prediction modeling, which was stimulated by various research grants including a fellowship from the Royal Netherlands Academy of Arts and Sciences (KNAW). Steyerberg is one of the most cited researchers from the Netherlands. He has published over 1000 peer-reviewed articles according to PubMed, many in collaboration with clinical researchers, both in methodological and medical journals. His h-index exceeds 150 according to Google Scholar.

== Biography ==
Steyerberg started his education in medicine at the Medical Faculty of Leiden University in 1985. After obtaining his propedeuse in medicine, he initiated his education in Biomedical Sciences at the same university. In 1991, he received his MSc (cum laude). He started working towards his PhD at the Department of Public Health of Erasmus MC. His thesis, titled Prognostic Modeling for Clinical Decision Making: Theory and Applications, was completed in 1996. Subsequently, Steyerberg held a position at Erasmus MC. He spent sabbaticals at Duke University (Durham, NC: 1996) and Harvard University (Boston, MA: 2003 and 2005). In 2006, he was appointed professor at Erasmus MC, where he has been the chair of the Medical Decision Making group till the end of 2016, succeeded by Dr Hester Lingsma. In 2017, Steyerberg was appointed as Chair of the Department of Biomedical Data Sciences at Leiden University Medical Center. At 15 February 2026, he started as professor and medical scientific division manager at the Julius Center for Health Sciences and Primary Care at University Medical Center Utrecht.

== Research findings ==
Steyerberg's methodological research is mainly focussed on clinical prediction modeling. He has developed and applied advanced regression modeling and related statistical techniques for prediction in many medical domains. Other areas of interest include design and analysis of randomized clinical trials, cost-effectiveness, decision analysis, and quality of care research, all with the aim to make better decisions in health care. Contemporary research themes have his attention, including Comparative effectiveness research, Big data, Machine learning, Value-based Healthcare and Precision medicine.

Medical fields of application include oncology (e.g. testicular, bladder, prostate, esophageal, colorectal, lymphomas, and hereditary cancers); cardiovascular disease (e.g. acute myocardial infarction, heart valve replacement, limb ischemia, primary and secondary prevention of CVD); internal medicine; pediatrics (e.g. triage systems); infectious diseases (e.g. leprosy, chlamydia trachomatis screening); neurology (Guillain Barré syndrome, stroke); and traumatic brain injury (prognosis and efficiency of trial design, comparative effectiveness research, new biomarkers).

=== Achievements ===
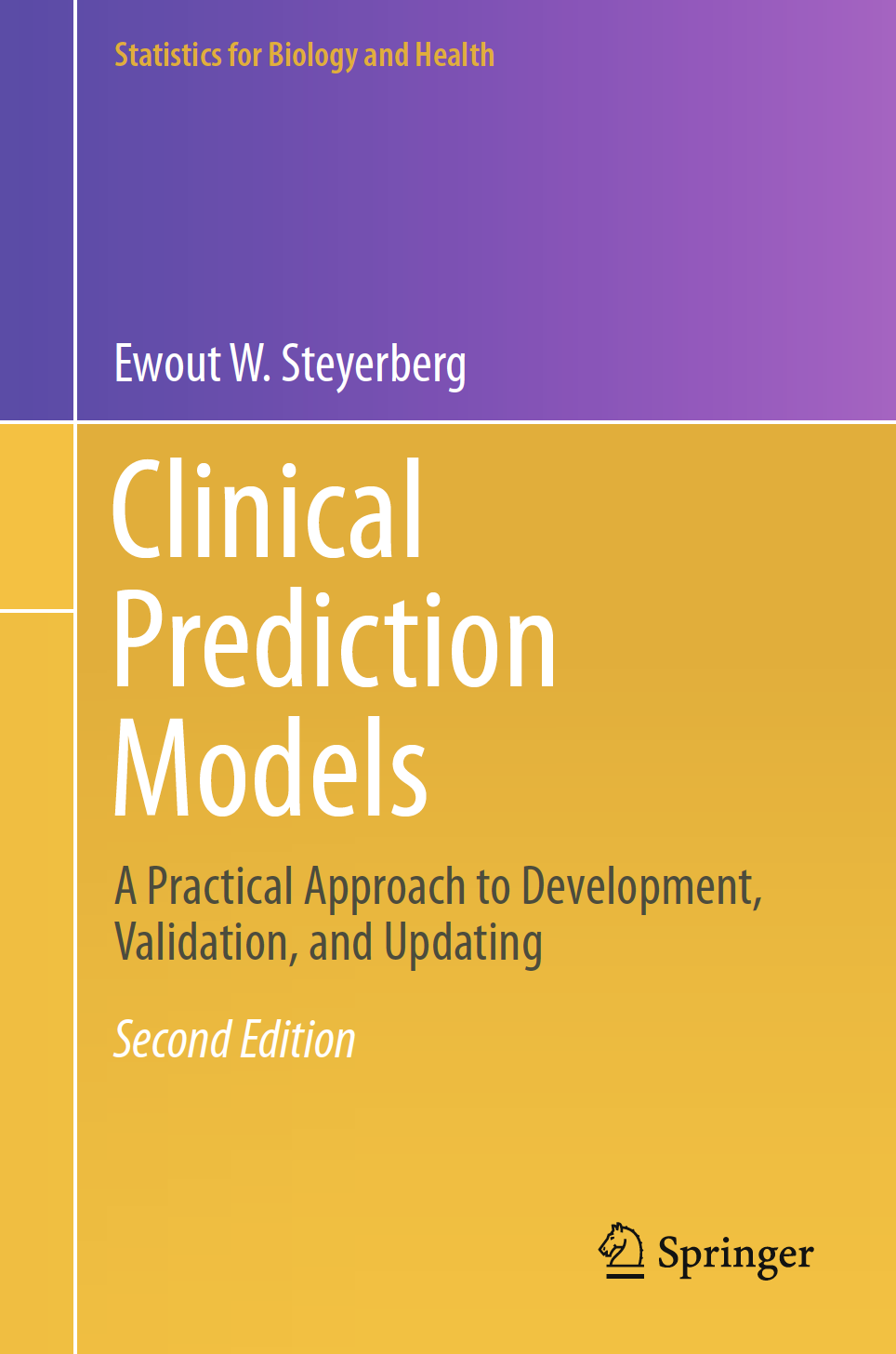
Cover "Clinical Prediction Models", 2nd Edition 2019, Springer

Steyerberg is known for his tremendous contribution to the field of statistical methods for prediction research. Among his most-cited articles are several methodological papers on the development and validation of clinical prediction models. In 2009, he published a text book ‘Clinical Prediction Models: A Practical Approach to Development, Validation, and Updating’. The book provides insight and practical illustrations on how modern statistical concepts and regression methods can be applied in medical prediction problems, including diagnostic and prognostic outcomes. It has become both a practical guide and reference work for anyone involved in prediction research in medicine. A second edition was published in 2019.

Steyerberg received a fellowship from the Royal Netherlands Academy of Arts and Sciences and the John M. Eisenberg Award for Practical Application of Medical Decision Making Research by the Society for Medical Decision Making in 2016. In 2019 Steyerberg was elected as member of the Royal Netherlands Academy of Arts and Sciences.

In 2022, he was elected a member of the Academia Europaea.
