= Lode Wyns =

Personal information
- Full name: Lodewijk Jules Arthur Wyns
- Nationality: Belgian
- Born: 29 November 1946 (age 79)

Sport
- Sport: Athletics
- Event: Javelin throw

Lode Wyns

Lodewijk Jules Arthur Wyns (born 29 November 1946) is a Belgian former athlete and molecular biologist and professor at the Vrije Universiteit Brussel (Brussels, Belgium).

He competed in the men's javelin throw at the 1968 Summer Olympics.

Lode Wyns obtained a PhD from the Vrije Universiteit Brussel in 1977 and is professor at the Faculty of Science since 1993. He is Scientific Director of the VIB Department of Molecular and Cellular Interactions, Vrije Universiteit Brussel since 1996. He is head of the VIB Department of Molecular and Cellular Interactions, Vrije Universiteit Brussel of the VIB. His research interest is on immunology, with an emphasis on cellular and applied immunology with major ramifications into parasitology and on structural biology such as protein structure, function and design.

== Sources ==
- VIB Department of Molecular and Cellular Interactions
- ULTR (Vrije Universiteit Brussel)
