= Thomas and William Winans =

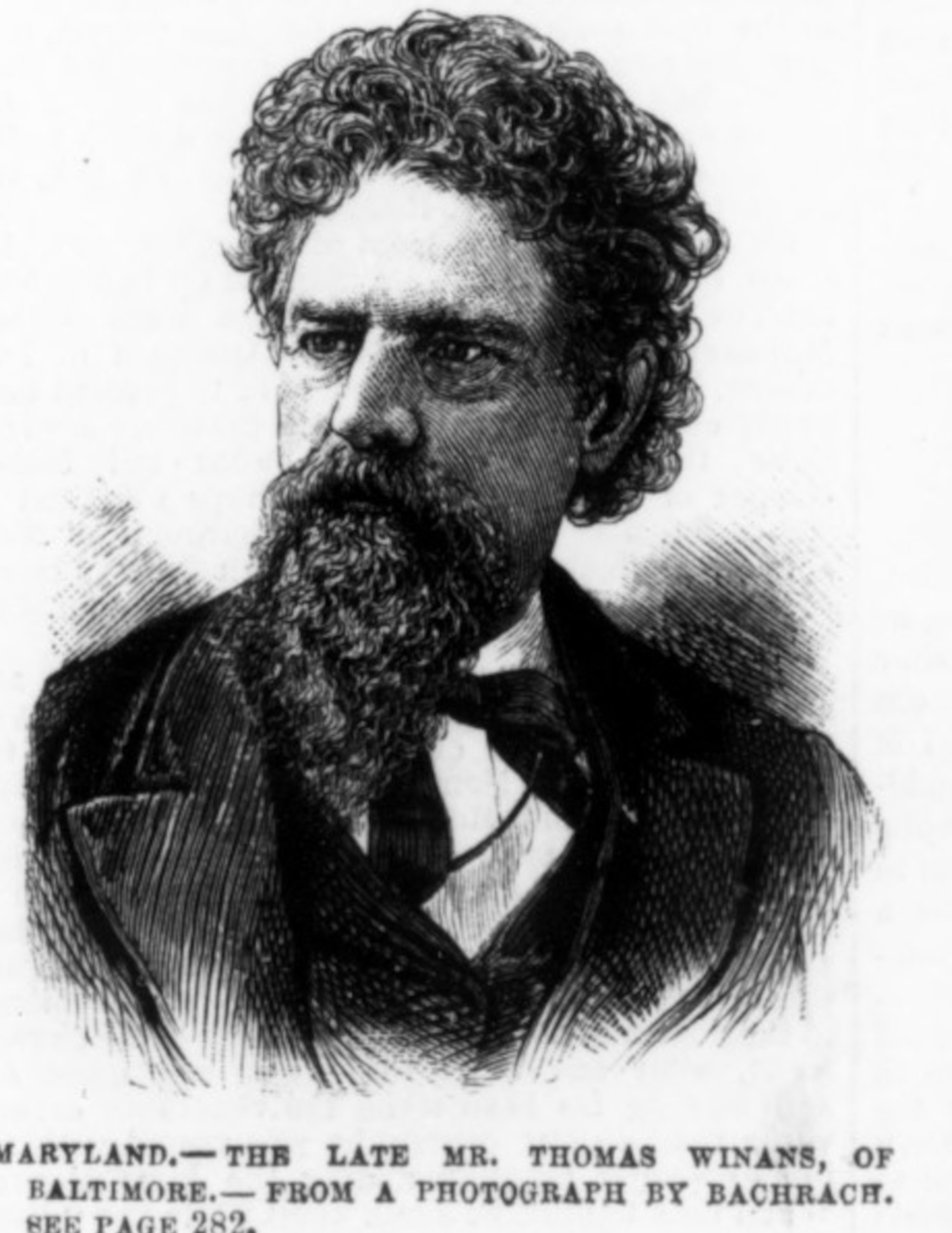
Thomas Winans c. 1870s from a photo by Bachrach. Page 282.

Thomas DeKay Winans (October 8, 1820 – June 10, 1878) and his brother, William Louis Winans (June 29, 1823 – June 25, 1897), were 19th-century American engineers and entrepreneurs who amassed a fortune by constructing one of the era's largest industrial projects: the Moscow to St. Petersburg Railway (1843–1851), the longest rail line in the world up to that time. They were the sons of Baltimore railway pioneer Ross Winans. The brothers were icons of American industrial innovation and Gilded Age extravagance.

== Biography ==
=== Early life ===
Thomas DeKay Winans and his brother, William Louis Winans, were the sons of Baltimore inventor and manufacturer Ross Winans. They were trained in their father's pioneering locomotive engineering shops. Raised in the shadow of their famous and mercurial father, they developed their own reputation as skilled and "unpretentious" railroad engineers. The most significant event of Thomas's early career occurred in 1838 when his father put the 18-year-old in charge of a locomotive delivery to the Boston & Albany railroad, marking his first major responsibility and exposure to an influential figure in the industry. There, he met and greatly impressed the accomplished engineer George Washington Whistler. This meeting directly led to the brothers securing a Russian contract that would make their fortunes.

=== Russia ===
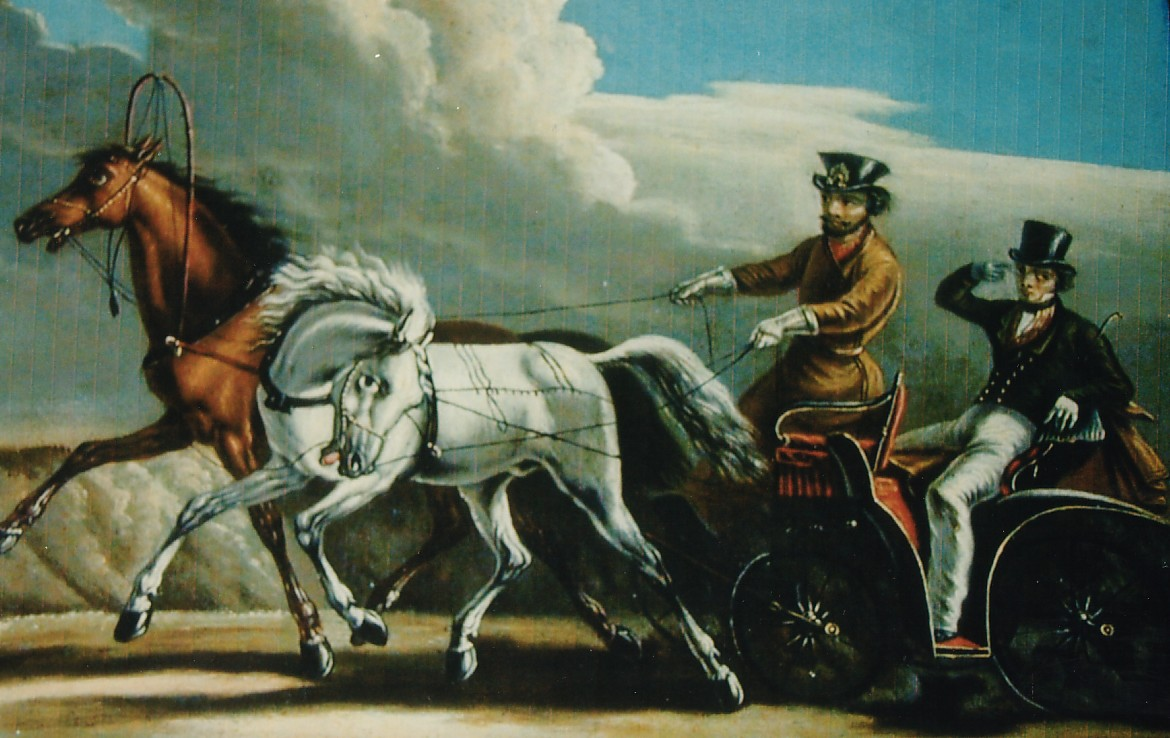
Thomas de Kay Winans. Russian troika. 1847.

The Winans brothers' Russian enterprise began with Tsar Nicholas I, who wanted to modernize his empire with a railway connecting St. Petersburg and Moscow. After a Russian delegation scouted American railroad technology, they hired the engineer George Washington Whistler as the project's chief consultant. Whistler recommended the Philadelphia firm of Eastwick & Harrison (Andrew McCalla Eastwick & Joseph Harrison Jr.) to build the rolling stock. Whistler, in turn, recommended that the mechanical works be placed in the charge of his friend and Baltimore railroad pioneer, Ross Winans. Frustrated with indirect routes and squabbling by his advisors, the Tsar took a ruler, drew a straight line on the map, and declared, "This is my line for the railroad. Build it that way!" While other engineers hesitated at the challenge, the Winans firm accepted the contract, which came with a heavy penalty for failure. While Ross Winans declined to move to Russia himself, he sent his two sons to manage the manufacturing operations in his stead.

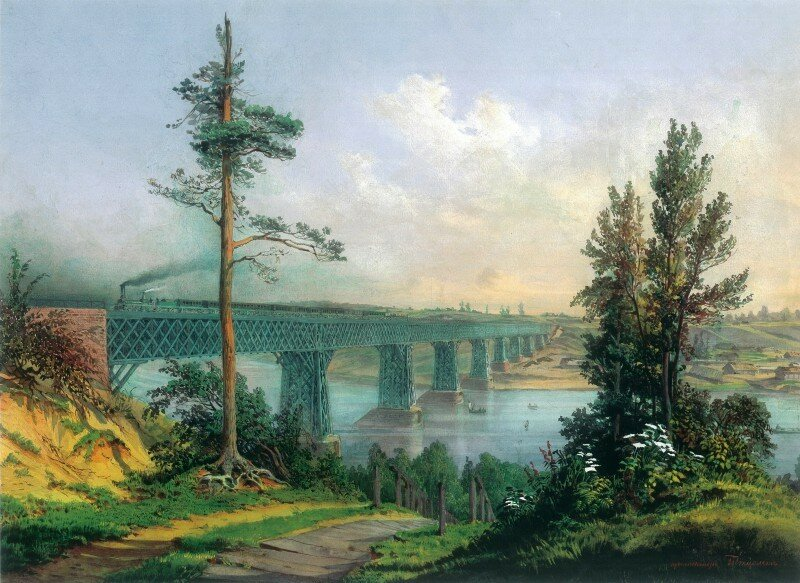
The bridge over the Msta river (watercolor, 1851)

In 1843, the firm Harrison, Winans & Eastwick was organized in Russia to fulfill the massive contract. It was a significant export of American expertise, with Harrison shipping a large portion of his Philadelphia factory's machinery to the Alexandrovsky Works in St. Petersburg, a crown facility set aside for the project. The American team included John H. B. Latrobe, who served as legal counsel because he spoke Russian. The families became intertwined when Whistler's brother, George, married the Winans's sister, Julia.

The construction of the 650-kilometer line was a monumental undertaking that took approximately nine years, beginning in early 1843 and officially opening on November 13, 1851. The project relied on tens of thousands of Russian serfs, and the high human cost was documented in the politically sensitive poem, The Railway, by Nikolay Nekrasov. The Alexandrovsky Works, managed by the Winans brothers, was highly productive; by 1851, the factory had produced 164 locomotives and roughly 2,500 freight and passenger cars. Among their creations was a lavish, 84-foot-long private car for the Tsar, complete with a parlor, kitchen, and wine cellar.

Despite their professional success, the American engineers faced social challenges with the Russian officials they worked with. The chief engineer, George Washington Whistler, was often ostracized. Tsar Nicholas I, noticing this at an art exhibition, personally took Whistler by the arm and escorted him around the gallery, chatting animatedly. After this display of Imperial favor, Whistler's social isolation ended.

The firm was successful. They finished their initial five-year, three-million dollar contract one year ahead of schedule, earning an additional two-million-dollar payment, and a 12-year contract to maintain all the rolling stock. This allowed the brothers to live extravagantly; one story recounts how when one of the Winans was quoted a high price for a box at a St. Petersburg circus, he bought every seat in the house. The brothers also diversified their activities in Russia, manufacturing gunpowder during the Crimean War and providing a steam pump from their factory that was instrumental in containing a great fire in St. Petersburg in 1862. William also served for a time as the U.S. vice-consul. Whistler died in 1849 of cholera before seeing the railway completed.

By the late 1860s, the Russian government faced a financial crisis. They decided to nationalize the railroad by buying out the Winans's contract, which was a drain on the Imperial treasury. The final payment was linked to the money Russia raised from the sale of Alaska to the United States in 1867. According to one account, the Winans received six and a half million rubles from the Alaska sale. While the final tally of their earnings in Russia is uncertain, one account stated that by 1858 Thomas Winans had earned about $17 million, while another claimed the brothers cleared a total of $30 million from all their Russian contracts.

=== Later life ===
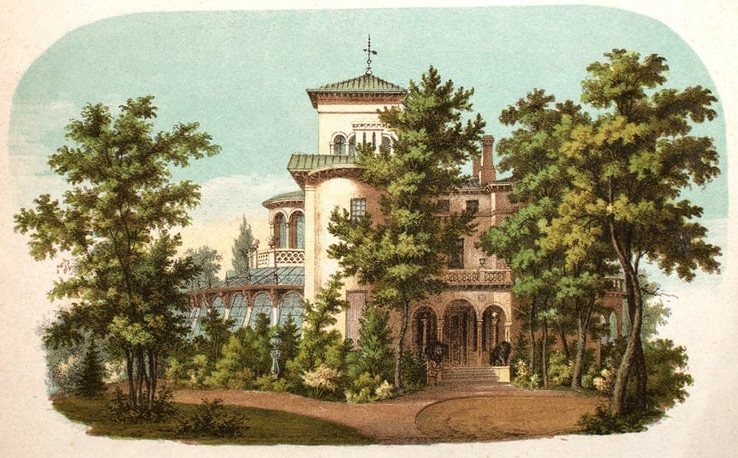
Alexandroffsky estate in Baltimore

Thomas Winans returned to Baltimore in 1850 and began developing several large properties. His city estate, which he called Alexandroffsky, occupied an entire block and contained a large mansion filled with art and a concert organ. The estate was surrounded by a high brick wall, which was reportedly built after neighbors complained about the nude classical statuary he had placed in his gardens. After his descendants moved to a more fashionable part of the city, the grand mansion was eventually demolished in 1929 to make way for rowhouses. His country estate, originally named Orianda but now known as the Crimea Mansion, is today part of Baltimore's Leakin Park and at the time featured its own racetrack and a Gothic-style chapel.

Thomas's wife, Celeste Revillon Winans, a Russian national of French and Italian descent, was known for her philanthropic work. She established the "Winans Soup Kitchen" in a converted church building opposite their mansion, serving hundreds of the city's poor daily before government welfare programs. Thomas also continued his engineering pursuits, designing a series of spindle-shaped "cigar boats" with his father. The first, a 180-foot steamer with a unique mid-ship propeller, was launched in Baltimore in 1858 but was ultimately a commercial failure. Beyond the boats, he patented improvements for warming and ventilating buildings, pianos, organs, and even a fishing-rod reel.

William L. Winans remained abroad, marrying a middle-class Englishwoman and settling in England. Remaining very private, he reportedly was the second-richest man in England after the Rothschilds, with an estimated fortune of $18–29 million and an annual income of about $2 million. He developed a fear of ocean travel after a near-shipwreck and expressed that he would only return to America if he could "cross on a railroad". Accounts from the time describe his lavish spending; for instance, he ordered a second custom-made $50,000 carpet to be laid on top of a first one he disliked. His sons, Walter and Louis, became known in the English press for their large-scale deer hunts at a private forest in Scotland, noted for their "shameful" wholesale slaughter of deer, where they employed sixty "gillies" (attendants) during hunting season.

Thomas Winans died in 1878 at his Newport, Rhode Island villa, leaving his entire fortune to his two children, Ross Revillon Winans and Celeste. His son Ross later married his cousin, Neva Whistler, who had been born in St. Petersburg. Thomas Winans was buried in Green Mount Cemetery.
