= Wynand =

Wynand is a given name. Notable people with the name include:

- Wynand Claassen (born 1951), South African rugby player
- Wynand Havenga (1965–2025), South African darts player
- Wynand Louw (born 1961), Namibian cricket umpire
- Wynand Malan (born 1943), liberal Afrikaner South African politician
- Wynand Olivier (born 1983), South African rugby union footballer

== See also ==
- Paul Wynand (1879–1956), German sculptor, medalist, and professor, active in the Nazi era
