= Winans Creek =

River in the United States of America

Coordinates: 29°44′51″N 99°09′25″W

Winans Creek is a stream in Bandera County, Texas, in the United States.

Winans Creek was named in the 1850s for a pioneer settler.

== See also ==
- List of rivers of Texas
