= Wijnand =

Wijnand is a given name. Notable people with the name include:

- Wijnand van Beveren (1911–2003), Dutch sprinter
- Wijnand Duyvendak (born 1957), Dutch politician
- Johan Wijnand van Goor (c. 1650 – 1704), Dutch general in the Nine Years' War and the War of Spanish Succession
- Wijnand Otto Jan Nieuwenkamp (1874–1950), Dutch multi-faceted autodidact
- Wijnand Nuijen (1813–1839), Dutch painter and printmaker who specialised in landscapes
- Wijnand Ott (born 1955), Dutch musician
- Wijnand van der Sanden (born 1953), Dutch archaeologist and prehistorian
