= Ross Winans =

American inventor (1796–1877)

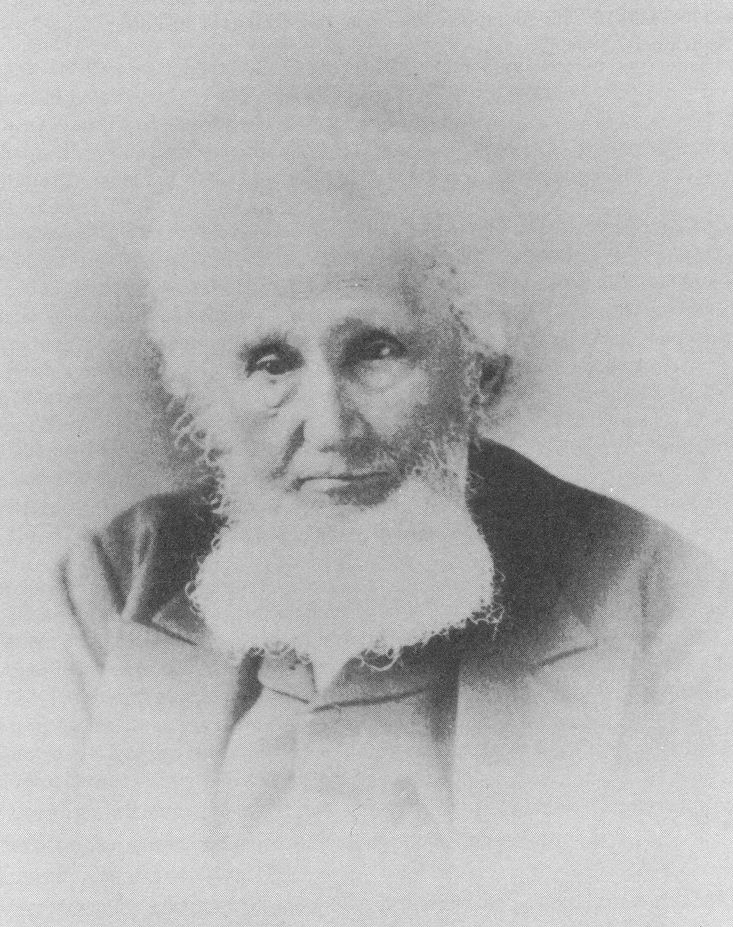
- Born: October 17, 1796; Vernon Township, New Jersey, U.S.
- Died: April 11, 1877 (aged 80); Baltimore, Maryland, U.S.
- Resting place: Green Mount Cemetery
- Occupations: Inventor, mechanic, and builder of locomotives and railroad machinery

Ross Winans (1796–1877) was a prominent American inventor, mechanic, and builder of locomotives and railroad machinery who became one of the nation's first multi-millionaires. He was also a noted designer of pioneering, cigar-hulled ships. In addition to his industrial career, Winans was actively involved in state and national politics as member of the Maryland House of Delegates, he was a vehement "states' rights" advocate and a known Southern sympathizer. His family was connected to the famous artist James McNeill Whistler.

== Personal life ==
Ross Winans was born in Vernon Township, New Jersey on October 17, 1796. His parents were William and Mary Winans. He married Julia de Kay (1800-1850) in 1820 and they had five children, the two eldest were Thomas and William Winans who later became notable in their own right. He moved his family to Baltimore, Maryland in the late 1820s and did business with the newly founded Baltimore and Ohio Railroad (B. & O.).

Following the death of his wife Julia in 1850, he married Elizabeth K. West (1807-1889) in 1854. Winans died in Baltimore on April 11, 1877, at the age of 80. He was buried in Green Mount Cemetery.

== Railroad career ==
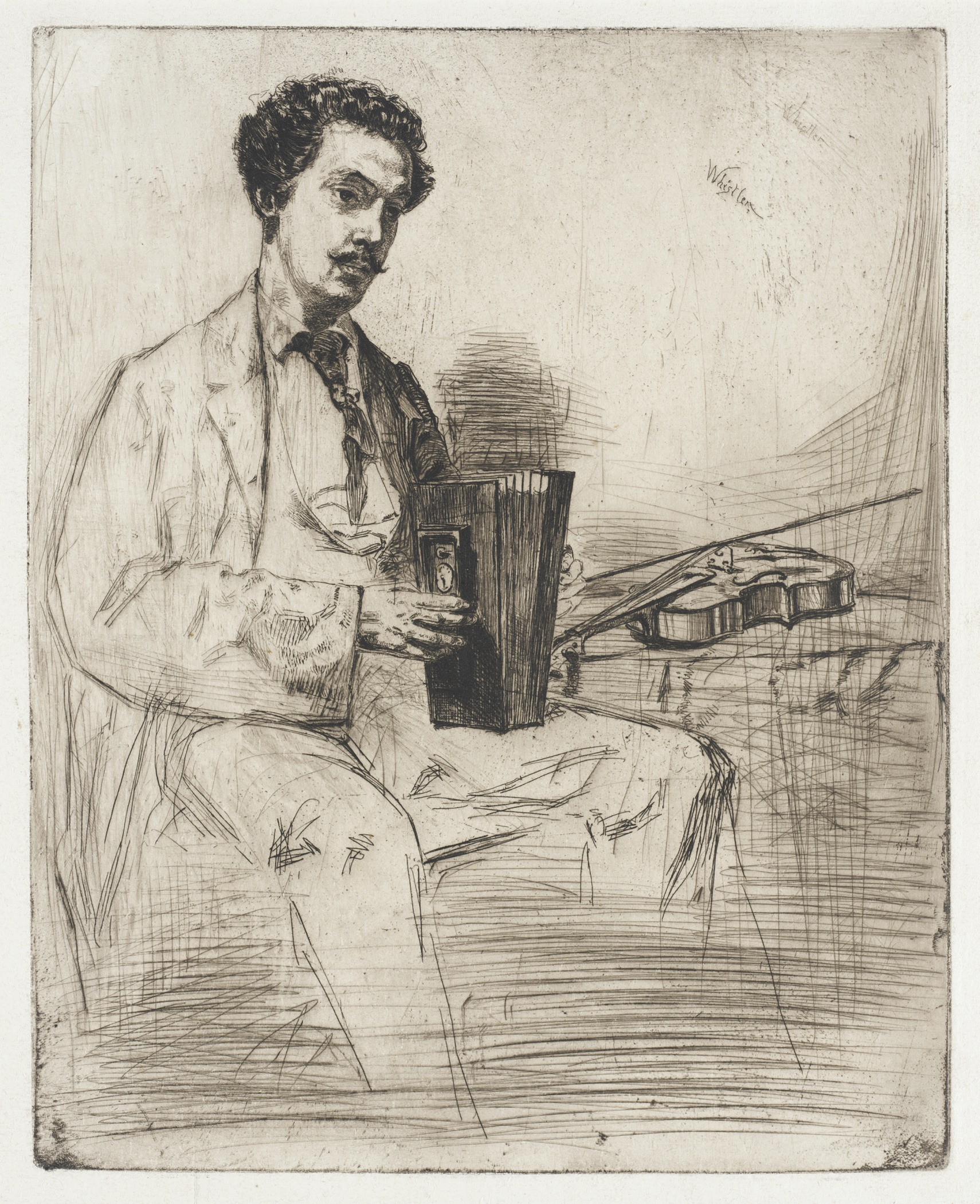
Ross Winans by Whistler

A pioneering railroad inventor and manufacturer, Ross Winans came from a New Jersey family of horse breeders but became a pivotal figure in the transition to mechanical motive power in the United States. His career began in the late 1820s in association with the fledgling Baltimore & Ohio Railroad, where he was tasked with assisting the New York industrialist Peter Cooper in building the revolutionary "Tom Thumb" steam locomotive. Winans quickly made his own mark, developing a friction wheel with outside bearings in 1828 that became a standard design for the next century. By 1831, he was the B&O's assistant engineer of machinery and secured patents for an improved axle design and for his "Columbus" locomotive, a double-truck car.

Winans soon transitioned from inventor to full-time manufacturer. In 1835, he entered a partnership with George Gillingham, and together they took over the lease for the B&O's Mount Clare Shops, continuing the work of locomotive production. By 1841, Winans had established his own independent works adjacent to the B&O's facilities, where he pioneered powerful, coal-burning freight locomotives, a significant advance over less efficient wood-burners. He was known as an eccentric and exacting businessman with a simple philosophy: he built engines his way, and customers bought them. His early work culminated in the development of an 8-wheel connected freight locomotive in the early 1840s, which set the stage for his later designs.

His most notable products were his 0-8-0 engines, a class of heavy-haul freight locomotives popularly known as "Crabs", "Muddiggers", and "Camels". These engines were designed for power over speed, operating at a modest 10-15 miles per hour but capable of pulling a 110-car train of loaded coal hoppers on level track. The most distinctive feature of the "Camel" was the engineer's cab placed unconventionally atop the boiler, a design choice made because Winans did not believe in the use of leading pilot trucks. The engines were technically advanced, featuring a large steam dome and over 100 iron boiler tubes, each more than 14 feet long.

The engines were popular and sold for around $10,000 each, a significant sum often financed by syndicates of investment bankers like Baltimore's Enoch Pratt. Over a 20-year period, Winans sold approximately 300 locomotives to twenty-six different American railroads. The Baltimore & Ohio and the Philadelphia and Reading Railroad were his primary customers, accounting for 70 percent of his sales. The engines were known for their durability; records from the Philadelphia & Reading line show an average service life of thirteen and a half years before requiring a major rebuild. This success was not without incident, however, as three catastrophic boiler explosions were documented, including one on the Huntingdon & Broad Top Mountain Railroad in 1863 that resulted in four deaths.

The impressive design of his locomotives also attracted international attention. After a visit from a Russian delegation, Winans was commissioned by the Czar to help build the imperial railroad line between the new capital of St. Petersburg and the old capital of Moscow. In one of the first major exports of American locomotive technology, Winans sent his two sons Thomas and William Winans with the accomplished engineer George W. Whistler to Russia to manage the massive project. The venture was so successful that his equipment sales in Russia may have equaled or exceeded his domestic sales.

Despite his success, Winans's angular personality and design disagreements, particularly over the use of pilot trucks, led to a falling out with the B&O. He quit the locomotive business in the late 1850s, but his legacy in Baltimore continued through his sons and the estates they built with the family's immense fortune. His son Thomas built the Russian-style "Alexandrofsky" estate near the present-day Hollins Market and the Italianate "Crimea" estate in what was then rural Baltimore County. While "Alexandrofsky" was later demolished, "Crimea" was sold to the city and is now the heart of Leakin Park, where the original stone mansion still stands. The park grounds still contain remnants of Winans's time, including intriguing cannon embankments he built to express his pro-Southern sympathies during the Civil War.

== Political activity ==
During the Maryland secession crisis of 1861, Ross Winans became an active and controversial political figure. He was elected to the Maryland House of Delegates for a special session called to debate the state's position in the escalating conflict. A staunch proponent of states' rights, Winans introduced a resolution protesting the use of militia from free states to garrison Southern forts and called upon Maryland's citizens to repel any "invader who may come to establish a military despotism over us". This action, taken the day before the Baltimore riot of 1861, placed him in direct opposition to federal authorities. In the riot's aftermath, reports circulated that his firm was manufacturing weapons, including pikes and cannonballs, for the defense of Baltimore against Union troops.

Winans's outspoken anti-Federal stance led to his arrest shortly after the riot, but he was released and promptly re-elected on a States Rights ticket on April 24. He then attended the reconvened special legislative session in Frederick, where the legislature ultimately rejected secession. While returning to Baltimore on May 14, one day after martial law had been declared in the city, Winans was arrested for a second time by federal troops under the command of General Benjamin Butler. This arrest was a notable application of President Lincoln's emergency suspension of habeas corpus. Unlike the famous case of John Merryman, Winans's incarceration was not legally challenged, and he was quickly released after signing a "parole" guaranteeing his loyalty to the federal government.

Winans's reputation was further complicated by his connection to the Winans Steam Gun, an experimental, centrifugal steam-powered weapon. Though he is often credited as its inventor, the gun was actually designed by Charles S. Dickinson in Boston a year earlier. The weapon passed through Winans's shop while his workers were producing other munitions for the city, leading to the widespread but incorrect belief that he had built it to oppose federal troops. While the novelty weapon had no real military impact, its association with Winans, combined with his political activities, cemented his reputation as a significant pro-Southern figure and a perceived threat to federal control of Maryland during the war.

== Cigar ship ==
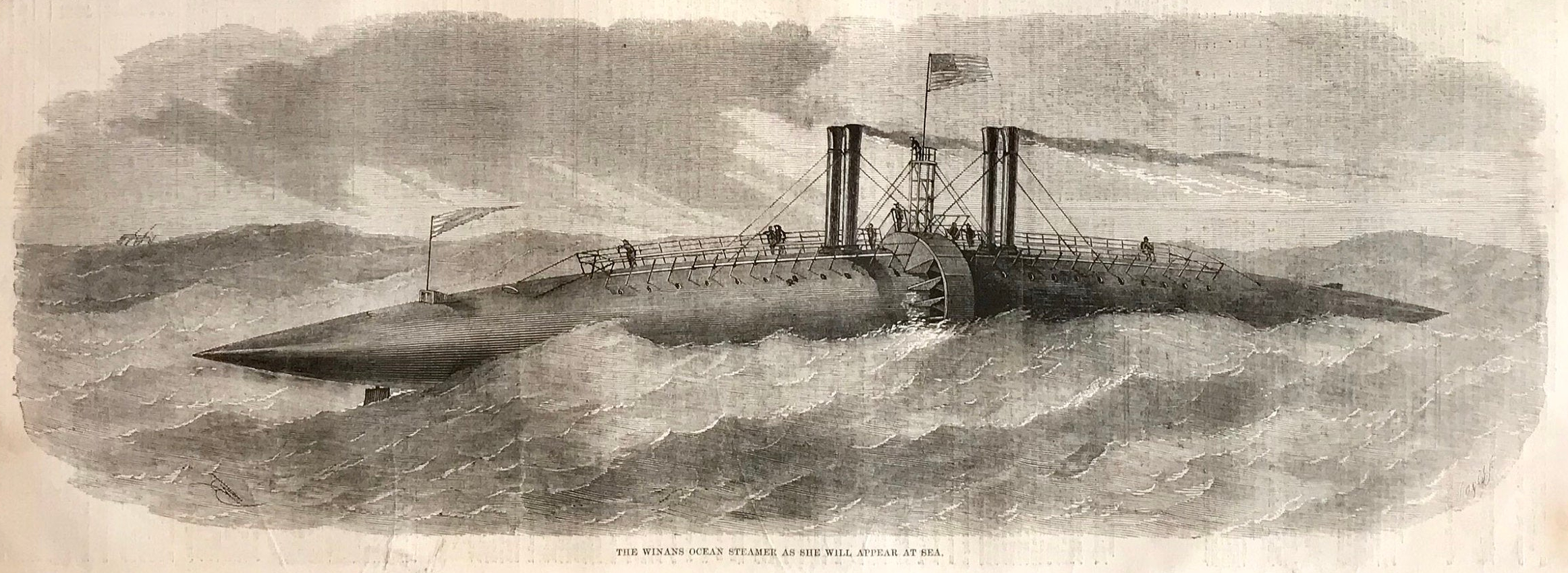
Engraving of the first Winans cigar ship/boat from the "Illustrated London News", 1858

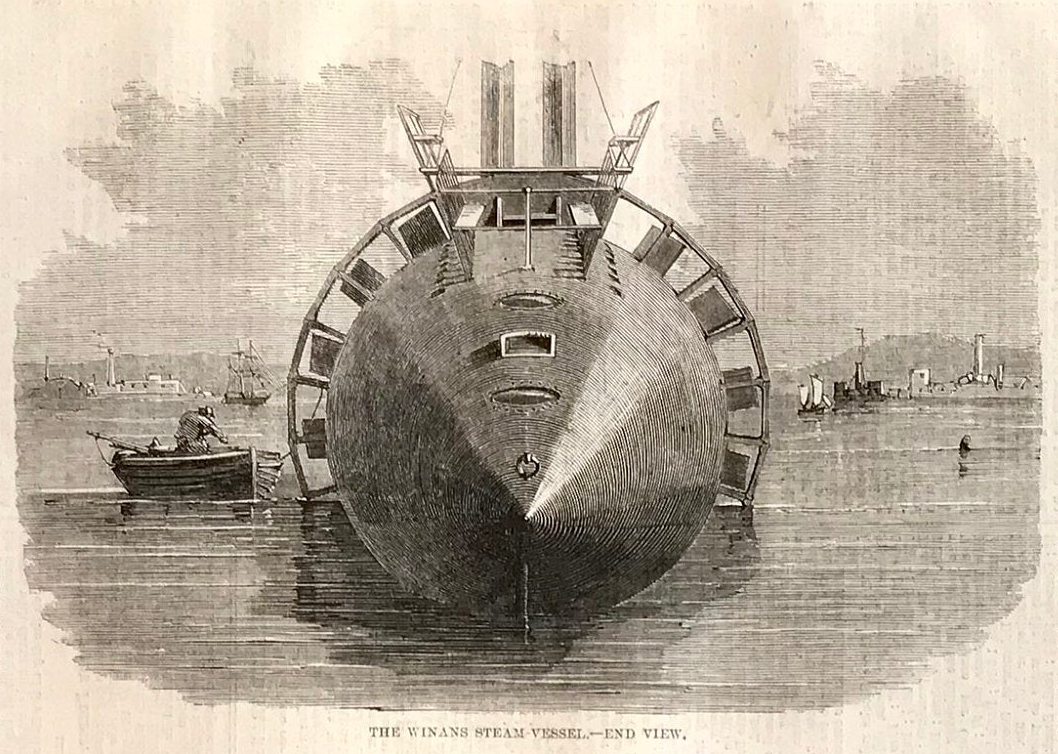
The Winans cigar boat was an inspiration for the submarine in Twenty Thousand Leagues Under the Seas.

In the mid-19th century, Ross Winans and his son Thomas turned their attention to naval architecture, designing and building a series of unconventional, spindle-shaped vessels commonly referred to as "cigar ships" (or "boats"). The first prototype was constructed in Baltimore in 1858, featuring a radical design intended to allow the ship to move through the water with less disturbance from waves and weather. Its hull was more than eleven times longer than its width, measuring 16 feet wide by an initial 108 feet long. Its most unique feature was a massive, shrouded propeller located midship, driven by four high-pressure steam engines.

This first cigar ship underwent a series of trials and modifications at the Winans docks at Ferry Bar in Baltimore, a location south of the Whetstone Point peninsula. During a trial in January 1859, it achieved a speed of 12 miles per hour. Winans subsequently lengthened the vessel first to 194 feet and then to 235 feet. Despite extensive discussion in journals like Scientific American, the ship was never subjected to a full sea trial and ultimately remained tied up at the Baltimore docks for many years.

After the Civil War began, Winans shifted his enterprise to Europe, where several similarly designed boats were built in England and St. Petersburg, Russia. His son William had gained naval construction experience during the Crimean War, outfitting gunboats for the defense of St. Petersburg at the Alexandrovsky railroad shops. In July 1861, Ross Winans presented a proposal to the Russian government titled "War Vehicles on the Spindle Principle". A Winans cigar boat was tested on the Neva River and in the Gulf of Finland, but it failed to impress the Russian Shipbuilding Technical Committee.

Undeterred, Winans also proposed the design to the U.S. Government for what he anticipated was a pending conflict with England, but nothing came of it. He transported one of his experimental Russian craft to England and built another cigar ship in Le Havre, France. In 1866, he launched his fourth cigar ship on the Thames River as his own private yacht. Despite his efforts, numerous problems prevented the yacht from making a planned voyage to St. Petersburg. Ultimately, none of the cigar ships were ever put to full sea trials; though they made trips in the Solent and the English Channel, the innovative design failed to gain commercial or military acceptance and inspired no imitators.

== Other interests ==
Winans took an interest in sanitary engineering and public health, publishing a number of pamphlets on sanitation, particularly in regard to water and ventilation. He lobbied for the development of a public water supply for Baltimore.

Winans was a pioneer in the development of low income housing building a housing project he called "workingmen's housing" in Baltimore. Today a public housing project remains on the site and is named Mount Winans.

He also published religious writings, including a pamphlet on religious tolerance and a collection of Unitarian sermons.

The Winans's cigar ship and its shape inspired Captain Nemo's submarine ship, in Twenty Thousand Leagues Under the Seas by Jules Verne (1870).

== Sources ==
- Bell, J. Snowden (1912). The Early Motive Power of the B&O Railroad. New York: Angus Sinclair Publishing.
- Bell, J. Snowden (October 1878). "The "Camel" engine of Ross Winans". Journal of the Franklin Institute. 106 (4): 246–250.
- Brown, George William (1887). Baltimore and the Nineteenth of April, 1861: A Study of the War. Baltimore: N. Murray.
- Crisafulli, Michael. "Winans Cigar Boats". The Vernian Era.
- Hungerford, Edward (1928). "The Iron Horse is Perfected". The Story of the Baltimore & Ohio Railroad 1827-1927. G. P. Putnum's and Sons. pp. 81–98.
- Lamb, John (2011). A Strange Engine of War: The "Winans" Steam Gun & Maryland in the Civil War, Chesapeake Book Company ISBN 0982304927.
- Maryland General Assembly. House of Delegates. Committee on Federal Relations. Report of the Committee on Federal Relations in Regard to the Calling of a Sovereign Convention. Frederick, Md.: E.S. Riley, printer, 1861.
- Maryland General Assembly. Protest of the General Assembly Against the Illegal Arrest and Imprisonment by the Federal Government of Citizens of Maryland. Frederick: B.H. Richardson, printer, 1861.
- Mitchell, Charles W. (2007). Maryland Voices of the Civil War. Johns Hopkins University Press.
- Newell (E. T.) Company. "Catalog of auction sale of all the remaining furniture, bric-a-brac, bronzes, statuary,.lot of books by foreign and American authors, etc., within the premises ‘Alexandrofsky’, former home of the Winans, Nov. 5, 1925, by order of Miss Elsie C. Hutton," Baltimore, 1925. (available at Pratt Library, Baltimore. Call Number: NK570.B4).
- Noskov, Vladimir V. (2016). "The End of the Winans' Brothers Railroad Enterprise in Russia". In Saul, Norman E.; Whisenhunt, William Benton (eds.). New Perspectives on Russian-American Relations. Routledge. pp. 36–50. ISBN 978-1-138-91623-4.
- Radinsky, Mike (May 12, 2011). "History Captured in Ellicott's Mills - Our quaint little town was the scene of what could have been a turning point in the Civil War... or maybe just a footnote". Elicott City Patch.
- Sagle, L. W. "Ross Winans," paper read before the New York Chapter, R&LHS, Feb. 21, 1947.
- Sagle, Lawrence W. (1952). A Picture History of B&O Motive Power: The Fascinating Story of 125 Years of Locomotive Development on the Great Baltimore and Ohio Railroad. Simmons-Boardman Publishing Co.
- Semmes, John Edward (1917). John H. B. Latrobe and his times: 1803-1891. Baltimore: Norman, Remington. p. 384-395.
- Shugg, Wallace (Winter 1998). "The Cigar Boat: Ross Winans' Maritime Wonder". Maryland Historical Magazine. 93 (4): 428–442.
- Stakem, Patrick H.; Stakem, Patrick E. (2011). From the (Iron) Horses Mouth An updated Roster from Ross Winans' Memorandum of Engines. PRRB Publishing.
- Stakem, Patrick H. (2016). Ross Winans, an ingenious mechanic of Baltimore. PRRB Publishing.
- Sullivan, John L. (January 1831). "Remarks on Winans' rail-way carriage". Journal of the Franklin Institute. 7 (1): 47–60.
- Sullivan, John L. (April 1829). "On the Baltimore rail-road carriage, invented by Ross Winans, Esq. and the manner of adapting it to streets; also on cheap rail-roads". Journal of the Franklin Institute. 3 (4): 231-240.
- Westwood, J. N. (1978). "Ross Winans". Locomotive Designers in the Age of Steam. Fairleigh Dickinson University Press. pp. 80–84.
- Whistler, George William. "Report Upon the Use of Anthracite Coal in Locomotive Engines on the Reading Rail Road, Made to the President of the Philadelphia And Reading Rail Road Company by George W. Whistler, Jr.," Baltimore: Printed by J. D. Toy, Pub. 1849, (available at Pratt Library, Baltimore).
- Winans, Ross. Collection of Articles and Correspondence in Relation to Baltimore Harbor Nuisance. Baltimore: John P. Des Forges, 1875.
- Winans, Ross. Gleanings from Theodore Parker's Works on Speculative Theism. Baltimore, Md: John P. Des Forges,
- Winans, Ross. Pocket Notebook, Collections of the Maryland Historical Society, Baltimore, Maryland, Folder 72, Box 23. The notebook covers the period June 8, 1848 to May 3, 1855.
- Winans, Ross. Gleanings from Frothingham, Longfellow, and others, selected, compiled and published, John P. Des Forges (1871), ASIN: B00088Y1A4.
- Winans, Ross. "A Communication to the President and Directors of the Baltimore & Ohio Railroad Company, on the subject of Locomotive Engines for the Transportation of Freight on Railroads." Baltimore: printed by John D. Toy, 1856;
- Winans, Ross. "Address to the President and Directors of the Baltimore & Ohio Railroad Company on the Subject of Locomotive Engines, and the Errors in Relation Thereto, Contained in a Pamphlet Recently Published by Authority of the Company," Baltimore: printed by John D. Toy, 1857.
- Winans, Ross. "Report to P. E. Thomas, President, Baltimore & Ohio Railroad, on the Operation of Peter Cooper’s Engine," August 28, 1830.
- Winans, Ross. "Documents relating to Ross Winans' patent for the eight-wheeled car,"
- Winans, Ross. Hazlehurst, John; Latrobe, Benjamin "Argument Delivered May 1st and 2nd, 1855: In the Case of Ross Winans Vs. the New York and Harlem," Printed by J.D. Toy.
- Winans, Ross. "Ross Winans vs. the Eastern Railroad Company; Evidence for Complainant October Term, 1853, Counsel R Choate, G T Curtis, C M Keller, C P Curtis," 2012, General Books, LLC, ISBN 9781236382269.
- Winans, Ross. Hubbell, William Wheeler "Arguments of William W. Hubbell," General Books LLC, 2012, ISBN 9781151291387.
- ---"The Last of the Camels", Railway Master Mechanic, Dec. 1891, Vol 106, Issue 4, pp 246–248
- ---"School's out for Winans Conversion; Publishing Firm decides to keep Mansion rather than sell it to UB," The Baltimore Sun, May 17, 2004, ISSN 1943-9504.
- --- The Jones' Falls Question: Hygiene and Sanitary Matters. Baltimore: J. P. Des Forges, 1872.
- --- Minority Report of W., One of the Water Commissioners Appointed ... to Examine the Sources from which a Supply of Pure Water may be obtained for the City of Baltimore. Baltimore:, 1853.
- --- Objections to Yielding to Northerners the Control of the Baltimore and Ohio Rail Road, on which Depends the Development of the Farms, Mines, Manufacturers and Trade of the State of Maryland. Baltimore:, 1860.
- --- Ventilation and Other Requisites to a Healthy and Comfortable Dwelling:. Baltimore: J. P. Des Forges, 1871.
- --- "A Few Off Minutes in Howard County: The Winans Steam Gun" (video). Howard Community College, 2019.
